= 2023–24 CD Leganés season =

CD Leganés
2023–24 season
- President: Jeff Luhnow
- Head coach: Borja Jiménez
- Stadium: Estadio Municipal de Butarque
- Segunda División: 1st (promoted)
- Copa del Rey: Second round
- Top goalscorer: League: Miguel de la Fuente (13); All: Miguel de la Fuente (13)
- Biggest defeat: Leganés 0–1 Andorra; Elche 1–0 Leganés
Home colours

The 2023–24 season was CD Leganés's 96th season in existence and fourth consecutive season in the Segunda División, the second division of association football in Spain. They also competed in the Copa del Rey.

== Players ==
=== First-team squad ===
As of 1 February 2024.

Note: Flags indicate national team as defined under FIFA eligibility rules; some limited exceptions apply. Players may hold more than one non-FIFA nationality.

No.	Pos.	Nation	Player
1	GK	ESP	Dani Jiménez
2	DF	CMR	Allan Nyom
3	DF	ESP	Jorge Sáenz
4	DF	CAN	Diyaeddine Abzi (on loan from Pau FC)
5	DF	ESP	Borja López (on loan from Zulte Waregem)
6	DF	ESP	Sergio González (captain)
7	FW	ESP	Francisco Portillo
8	MF	ESP	Luis Perea
9	FW	ESP	Miguel de la Fuente (on loan from Alavés)
10	FW	ESP	Dani Raba
11	FW	ESP	Juan Cruz (on loan from Betis)
13	GK	ESP	Diego Conde

No.	Pos.	Nation	Player
14	MF	SRB	Darko Brašanac
15	DF	ESP	Enric Franquesa (on loan from Levante)
17	MF	CMR	Yvan Neyou
19	FW	ESP	Diego García
20	MF	ESP	Iker Undabarrena
21	DF	ESP	Jorge Miramón
22	DF	ESP	Aritz Arambarri
23	FW	FRA	Naïs Djouahra (on loan from Rijeka)
24	MF	ARG	Julián Chicco
28	FW	ESP	Oscar Ureña (on loan from Girona)
32	MF	GUI	Seydouba Cissé

=== Reserve team ===
Note: Flags indicate national team as defined under FIFA eligibility rules; some limited exceptions apply. Players may hold more than one non-FIFA nationality.

No.	Pos.	Nation	Player
26	MF	ESP	Carlos Guirao
29	FW	ESP	Sydney Osazuwa
30	GK	ESP	Javi Garrido
36	GK	ESP	Alvin

No.	Pos.	Nation	Player
38	DF	ESP	Víctor Rodríguez
40	FW	ESP	Piri
41	MF	ESP	Hugo Solozábal
42	FW	ESP	Koke Mota

=== Out on loan ===
Note: Flags indicate national team as defined under FIFA eligibility rules; some limited exceptions apply. Players may hold more than one non-FIFA nationality.

No.	Pos.	Nation	Player
—	DF	UGA	Aziz Kayondo (at Hapoel Tel Aviv until 30 June 2024)
—	DF	ESP	Isma Armenteros (at Melilla until 30 June 2024)
—	DF	ESP	Javi Hernández (at Cádiz until 30 June 2024)
—	DF	ESP	Lalo Aguilar (at Atlético Madrid B until 30 June 2024)
—	DF	ESP	Rodrigo Abajas (at Rayo Majadahonda until 30 June 2024)

No.	Pos.	Nation	Player
—	MF	ESP	Álex Gil (at Tarazona until 30 June 2024)
—	MF	ESP	Javier Avilés (at Málaga until 30 June 2024)
—	FW	ESP	Sergio Navarro (at Rayo Majadahonda until 30 June 2024)
—	FW	ESP	Naim García (at Barcelona Atlètic until 30 June 2024)

== Transfers ==
=== In ===
Pos.	Player	Transferred from	Fee	Date	Source

=== Out ===
Pos.	Player	Transferred to	Fee	Date	Source
DF	(Nigeria) Kenneth Omeruo	(Turkey) Kasımpaşa	Undisclosed	27 July 2023	

== Pre-season and friendlies ==
Win Draw Loss Fixtures

5 January 2024 Friendly	Alcorcón	0–0	Leganés	Alcorcón
11:30 UTC+1				Stadium: Santo Domingo; Attendance: 100; Referee: Rodríguez Recio

== Competitions ==
=== Overall record ===
Competition	First match	Last match	Starting round	Final position	Record							
Competition	First match	Last match	Starting round	Final position	Pld	W	D	L	GF	GA	GD	Win %
Segunda División	13 August 2023	2 June 2024	Matchday 1	Winners	42	20	14	8	56	27	+29	47.62
Copa del Rey	1 November 2023	7 December 2023	First round	Second round	2	1	0	1	2	1	+1	50.00
Total					44	21	14	9	58	28	+30	47.73

Source: Soccerway

=== Segunda División ===
==== League table ====
Pos	Team	Pld	W	D	L	GF	GA	GD	Pts	Qualification or relegation
1	Leganés (C, P)	42	20	14	8	56	27	+29	74	Promotion to La Liga
2	Valladolid (P)	42	21	9	12	51	36	+15	72	Promotion to La Liga
3	Eibar	42	21	8	13	72	48	+24	71	Qualification for promotion play-offs
4	Espanyol (O, P)	42	17	18	7	59	40	+19	69	Qualification for promotion play-offs
5	Sporting Gijón	42	18	11	13	51	42	+9	65	Qualification for promotion play-offs

Updated to match(es) played on 2 Jun 2024. Source: LaLiga HyperMotion
Rules for classification: 1) Points; 2) Head-to-head points; 3) Head-to-head goal difference; 4) Goal difference; 5) Goals scored; 6) Fair-play points
(Note: Head-to-head record is used only after all the matches between the teams in question have been played)
(C) Champions; (O) Play-off winners; (P) Promoted

==== Results summary ====
Overall								Home						Away					
Pld	W	D	L	GF	GA	GD	Pts	W	D	L	GF	GA	GD	W	D	L	GF	GA	GD
42	20	14	8	56	27	+29	74	11	8	2	33	11	+22	9	6	6	23	16	+7

Source: LALIGA HYPERMOTION

==== Results by round ====
Round	1	2	3	4	5	6	7	8	9	10	11	12	13	14	15	16	17	18	19	20	21	22	23	24
Ground	H	A	H	A	H	A	A	H	A	H	H	A	H	A	H	A	H	A	H	A	H	A	H	A
Result	L	W	W	W	W	L	W	W	L	D	W	W	W	W	W	D	D	L	D	D	D			
Position	17	11	5	3	3	3	2	1	3	3	2	1	1	1	1	1	1	1	1	1	1			

Updated to match(es) played on 24 February 2024. Source: LALIGA HYPERMOTION
A = Away; H = Home; W = Win; D = Draw; L = Loss

==== Matches ====
The league fixtures were unveiled on 28 June 2023.

13 August 2023 1	Leganés	0–1	Andorra	Leganés
22:00 CEST (UTC+2)	Chicco (yellow card) 22'; Perea (yellow card) 41'; Undabarrena (yellow card) 64'; Miramón (yellow card) 87'; Arambarri (yellow card) 90+3'	Report	Bover 29'; Petxarroman (yellow card) 61'	Stadium: Estadio Municipal de Butarque; Attendance: 5,007; Referee: Rafael Sánchez López

19 August 2023 2	Alcorcón	0–2	Leganés	Alcorcón
22:00 CEST (UTC+2)		Report	Undabarrena 49'; Raba 71'	Stadium: Estadio Municipal de Santo Domingo; Attendance: 2,722; Referee: Luis Mario Milla Alvendiz

27 August 2023 3	Leganés	2–0	Albacete	Leganés
21:30 CEST (UTC+2)	Raba 22' (pen.); D. García 68' (pen.)	Report		Stadium: Estadio Municipal de Butarque; Attendance: 6,927; Referee: Iván Caparrós Hernández

3 September 2023 4	Eibar	0–1	Leganés	Eibar
16:15 CEST (UTC+2)		Report	Chicco 33'	Stadium: Ipurua Municipal Stadium; Attendance: 4,916; Referee: Daniel Jesús Trujillo Suárez

9 September 2023 5	Leganés	2–0	Huesca	Leganés
21:00 CEST (UTC+2)	Miramón 42'; Franquesa 77'	Report		Stadium: Estadio Municipal de Butarque; Attendance: 6,948; Referee: Dámaso Arcediano Monescillo

17 September 2023 6	Elche	1–0	Leganés	Elche
18:30 CEST (UTC+2)	León 33'	Report		Stadium: Estadio Martínez Valero; Attendance: 16,154; Referee: José Antonio López Toca

24 September 2023 7	Mirandés	1–3	Leganés	Miranda de Ebro
18:30 CEST (UTC+2)	Chaira 34'	Report	Djouahra 44'; De la Fuente 55'; García 90+5'	Stadium: Estadio Municipal de Anduva; Referee: Miguel González Díaz

29 September 2023 8	Leganés	2–1	Racing Santander	Leganés
21:00 CEST (UTC+2)	Germán 28' (o.g.); Raba 52'	Report	Sangalli 90+2'	Stadium: Estadio Municipal de Butarque; Attendance: 8,953; Referee: Jon Ander González Esteban

4 October 2023 9	Burgos	1–0	Leganés	Burgos
21:30 CEST (UTC+2)	Curro 1'	Report		Stadium: El Plantío; Attendance: 8,254; Referee: Iván Caparrós Hernández

7 October 2023 10	Leganés	0–0	Oviedo	Leganés
21:00 CEST (UTC+2)	Dani Raba (yellow card) 43'; Neyou (yellow card) 80'; Sergio González (yellow card) 85'	Report	Dani Calvo (yellow card) 31'	Stadium: Estadio Municipal de Butarque; Attendance: 8,249; Referee: Rubén Ávalos Barrera

15 October 2023 11	Leganés	6–0	Amorebieta	Leganés
18:30 CEST (UTC+2)	Miguel de la Fuente 21' 25' 50'; Diego García 73'; Cicco (yellow card) 77' (goal) 90+3'; Dani Raba 82'	Report	Jonmi Magunagoitia (yellow card) 50'; Álvaro Núñez (yellow card) 69'	Stadium: Estadio Municipal de Butarque; Attendance: 7,696; Referee: Andrés Fuentes Molina

20 October 2023 12	Espanyol	0–1	Leganés	Cornellà de Llobregat
21:00 CEST (UTC+2)	Fernando Calero (yellow card) 9'; Bare (yellow card) 61' (red card) 90+7'	Report	Dani Raba (yellow card) 30'; Miguel de la Fuente 48' (yellow card) 61'; Enric Franquesa (yellow card) 89'; Chicco (yellow card) 90+2'	Stadium: Stage Front Stadium; Attendance: 20,599; Referee: Miguel Sesma Espinosa

29 October 2023 13	Leganés	1–0	Villarreal B	Leganés
18:30 CEST (UTC+2)	Sergio González 51'; Jorge Sáenz (yellow card) 76'; Cissé (yellow card) 90+3'	Report	Javi Ontiveros (yellow card) 28'; Antonio Espigares (yellow card) 50' (red card) 81'	Stadium: Estadio Municipal de Butarque; Attendance: 7.008; Referee: Germán Cid Camacho

5 November 2023 14	FC Cartagena	0–3	Leganés	Cartagena
18:30 CET (UTC+1)	Iván Calero (yellow card) 71'	Report	Neyou (yellow card) 43'; Miguel de la Fuente 50' 61'; Dani Raba 69'; Iker Undabarrena (yellow card) 90+1'	Stadium: Estadio Cartagonova; Attendance: 6,805; Referee: Iosu Galech Apezteguía

10 November 2023 15	Leganés	2–1	Levante	Leganés
20:30 CET (UTC+1)	Iker Undabarrena (yellow card) 53'; Miguel de la Fuente 56' (pen.); Dani Raba 66'; Chicco (yellow card) 90'	Report	Pablo Martínez 14'; Ander Capa (yellow card) 68'; Postigo (yellow card) 90+9'	Stadium: Estadio Municipal de Butarque; Attendance: 8,416; Referee: Luis Milla Alvendiz

17 November 2023 16	Real Valladolid	1–1	Leganés	Valladolid
21:00 CET (UTC+1)	Sylla 26'; Raúl Moro (yellow card) 55'	Report	Sergio González (yellow card) 31' (goal) 51'; Iker Undabarrena (yellow card) 45+3'; Jorge Miramón (yellow card) 55'	Stadium: Estadio José Zorrilla; Attendance: 19,914; Referee: José López Toca

26 November 2023 17	Leganés	2–2	Racing de Ferrol	Leganés
14:00 CET (UTC+1)	Neyou 30' (pen.); Diego García 42'; De la Fuente (yellow card) 65'	Report	Iker Losada 9'; Josep Señé 15' (yellow card) 29'; David Castro (red card) 29'; Álvaro Vadillo (yellow card) 29'	Stadium: Estadio Municipal de Butarque; Attendance: 8,704; Referee: Miguel González Díaz

2 December 2023 18	Real Zaragoza	1–0	Leganés	Zaragoza
18:30 CET (UTC+1)	Marc Aguado (yellow card) 28'; Víctor Mollejo (yellow card) 34'; Maikel Mesa 39'	Report	Miguel de la Fuente (yellow card) 65'	Stadium: La Romareda; Attendance: 21,728; Referee: Salvador Lax Franco

10 December 2023 19	Leganés	1–1	Eldense	Leganés
18:30 CET (UTC+1)	Dani Raba (yellow card) 28' (goal) 35' (pen.); Miguel de la Fuente (yellow card) 85'; Nyom (yellow card) 90+4'	Report	Đumić (yellow card) 10'; Sergio Ortuño 42'; Toni Abad (yellow card) 70'; Iván Chapela (yellow card) 85'	Stadium: Estadio Municipal de Butarque; Attendance: 7,547; Referee: José Luis Guzmán Mansilla

16 December 2023 20	Sporting Gijón	1–1	Leganés	Gijón
18:30 CET (UTC+1)	Izquierdoz (yellow card) 45+2'; Otero 51' (pen.); Cote (yellow card) 57'; Alejandro Lozano (yellow card) 90+6'	Report	Sergio González 37'; Cissé (yellow card) 45+1'; Enric Franquesa (yellow card) 82'; Nyom (yellow card) 85'	Stadium: El Molinón; Attendance: 20,035; Referee: Jon González Esteban

20 December 2023 21	Leganés	1–1	Tenerife	Leganés
21:30 CET (UTC+1)	Neyou (yellow card) 62'; Aritz Arambarri (yellow card) 81'; Sergio González 84'	Report	Roberto López (yellow card) 43'; Teto 57'; José María Amo (yellow card) 85'; Sergio González (yellow card) 90+7'	Stadium: Estadio Municipal de Butarque; Attendance: 6,807; Referee: Iván Caparrós Hernández

14 January 2024 22	FC Andorra	2–3	Leganés	Andorra la Vella
14:00 CET (UTC+1)				Stadium: Estadi Nacional

22 January 2024 23	Leganés	2–0	Burgos	Leganés
20:30 CET (UTC+1)				Stadium: Estadio Municipal de Butarque

27 January 2024 24	Oviedo	1–0	Leganés	Oviedo
				Stadium: Estadio Carlos Tartiere

18 February 2024 27	Leganés	3–0	Alcorcón	Leganés
16:15 CET (UTC+1)	García 18'; Portillo 66'; Raba 81'			Stadium: Estadio Municipal de Butarque; Referee: Andrés Fuentes Molina

24 February 2024 28	Racing Santander	2–1	Leganés	Santander
16:15	Vicente 45+2'; Fernández 64' (pen.)		García 7'	Stadium: Campos de Sport de El Sardinero; Referee: Jon Ander González Esteban

11 March 2024 30	Amorebieta	v	Leganés	Lezama
20:30 CET (UTC+1)				Stadium: Instalaciones de Lezama Campo 2

21 April 2024 36	Tenerife	v	Leganés	Santa Cruz de Tenerife
				Stadium: Estadio Heliodoro Rodríguez López

=== Copa del Rey ===
1 November 2023 First round	Llerenense	0–2	Leganés	Don Benito
12:00 CET (UTC+1)		Report	Nyom 9'; Lalo 61'	Stadium: Estadio Vicente Sanz; Referee: Óliver de la Fuente Ramos

7 December 2023 Second round	Racing de Ferrol	1–0	Leganés	Ferrol
20:00 CET (UTC+1)	Sabin Merino (yellow card) 19'; David Castro (yellow card) 44'; Julián Delmás (yellow card) 45'; Nacho 56'; Manu Justo (yellow card) 74'	Report	Lalo Aguilar (yellow card) 21'; Nyom (yellow card) 70'; Sergio González (yellow card) 74'; Dani Raba (yellow card) 78'	Stadium: Estadio Municipal da Malata; Referee: Rubén Campo Hernández
