= 2022–23 CD Leganés season =

CD Leganés
2022–23 season
- President: Jeff Luhnow
- Head coach: Imanol Idiakez
- Stadium: Estadio Municipal de Butarque
- Segunda División: 14th
- Copa del Rey: First round
Home colours	Away colours	Third colours

The 2022–23 season was the 95th season in the history of CD Leganés and their third consecutive season in the second division. The club participated in the Segunda División and the Copa del Rey.

== Players ==
As of 11 November 2022.

Note: Flags indicate national team as defined under FIFA eligibility rules; some limited exceptions apply. Players may hold more than one non-FIFA nationality.

No.	Pos.	Nation	Player
1	GK	ESP	Dani Jiménez
2	DF	CMR	Allan Nyom
3	DF	ESP	Jorge Sáenz (on loan from Valencia)
4	DF	NGR	Kenneth Omeruo (captain)
5	DF	ESP	Josema
6	DF	ESP	Sergio González (4th captain)
7	FW	ESP	Javier Avilés
8	MF	JPN	Gaku Shibasaki
9	FW	MAR	Yacine Qasmi
10	FW	ESP	José Manuel Arnáiz (3rd captain)
11	FW	ESP	Juan Muñoz (vice-captain)
13	GK	ESP	Asier Riesgo (5th captain)
14	MF	ESP	Fede Vico

No.	Pos.	Nation	Player
16	MF	CMR	Yvan Neyou (on loan from Saint-Étienne)
17	MF	ESP	Dani Raba
18	MF	ESP	Rubén Pardo
20	MF	ESP	Iker Undabarrena
21	DF	ESP	Jorge Miramón
22	DF	DEN	Riza Durmisi (on loan from Lazio)
24	FW	POL	Piotr Parzyszek
25	GK	ESP	Javier Belman
27	MF	ESP	Naim García
28	FW	ESP	Manu Garrido
30	GK	ESP	Javi Garrido
32	MF	GUI	Seydouba Cissé

=== Reserve team ===
Note: Flags indicate national team as defined under FIFA eligibility rules; some limited exceptions apply. Players may hold more than one non-FIFA nationality.

No.	Pos.	Nation	Player
26	MF	ESP	Álex Gil
31	MF	BRA	Caio Lopes
33	DF	ESP	Lalo Aguilar

No.	Pos.	Nation	Player
34	MF	ESP	Javier Rentero
35	DF	ESP	Sergio Camacho
38	GK	ESP	Christian Gómez

=== Out on loan ===
Note: Flags indicate national team as defined under FIFA eligibility rules; some limited exceptions apply. Players may hold more than one non-FIFA nationality.

No.	Pos.	Nation	Player
—	DF	GHA	Félix Ofoli (at Majadahonda until 30 June 2023)
—	DF	ESP	Javi Hernández (at Girona until 30 June 2023)
—	MF	ESP	Álex Masogo (at Pontevedra until 30 June 2023)
—	MF	ESP	Luis Perea (at OFI until 30 June 2023)

No.	Pos.	Nation	Player
—	FW	ESP	Diego García (at Fuenlabrada until 30 June 2023)
—	FW	ESP	Ruby Sánchez (at Móstoles until 30 June 2023)
—	FW	BRA	William de Camargo (at Deinze until 30 June 2023)

== Transfers ==
=== In ===
Date	Player	From	Type	Fee	Ref
1 July 2022	(Spain) Dani Raba	Granada	Transfer	Free	
5 July 2022	(Spain) Jorge Sáenz	Valencia	Loan		
19 July 2022	(Spain) Jorge Miramón	Levante	Transfer	Free	
12 August 2022	(Spain) Josema	Elche	Transfer	Free	
26 August 2022	(Spain) Iker Undabarrena	(Portugal) Tondela	Transfer	Undisclosed	
31 August 2022	(Cameroon) Yvan Neyou	(France) Saint-Étienne	Loan		
1 September 2022	(Denmark) Riza Durmisi	(Italy) Lazio	Loan		
5 September 2022	(Poland) Piotr Parzyszek	(Italy) Frosinone	Transfer	Free	

=== Out ===
Date	Player	To	Type	Fee	Ref
1 July 2022	(Spain) Unai Bustinza	Málaga	Transfer	Free	
1 July 2022	(Spain) Javier Eraso	(Cyprus) Akritas Chlorakas	Transfer	Free	
1 July 2022	(Argentina) Facundo García	Released			
3 August 2022	(Spain) Diego García	Fuenlabrada	Loan		
19 August 2022	(Spain) Javi Hernández	Girona	Loan		
26 August 2022	(Venezuela) Josua Mejías	(Israel) Beitar Jerusalem	Transfer	Undisclosed	
1 September 2022	(Brazil) William de Camargo	(Belgium) Deinze	Loan		
10 September 2022	(Spain) Luis Perea	(Greece) OFI Crete	Loan		

== Pre-season and friendlies ==
Win Draw Loss Fixtures

16 July 2022 Friendly	Leganés	2–0	Getafe	Leganés
20:00 CEST (UTC+2)	Cissé 32'; Kravets 64'			Stadium: Estadio Municipal de Butarque; Referee: Dámaso Arcediano Monescillos

19 July 2022 Friendly	Leganés	0–2	Andorra	San Pedro del Pinatar
19:00 CEST (UTC+2)				Stadium: Pinatar Arena Football Center

21 July 2022 Friendly	Leganés	2–0	Wrexham	Orihuela Costa
10:00 CEST (UTC+2)				Stadium: Real Club de Golf Campoamor Campo 1

23 July 2022 Friendly	Elche	2–1	Leganés	San Pedro del Pinatar
10:00 CEST (UTC+2)				Stadium: Pinatar Arena; Referee: Jorge Díaz Escudero

27 July 2022 Friendly	Leganés	1–2	Rayo Vallecano	Leganés
19:30 CEST (UTC+2)	Muñoz 79'		Palazón 53'; Falcao 84'	Stadium: Instalación Deportiva Butarque

30 July 2022 Friendly	Leganés	0–0	Albacete	Leganés
19:30 CEST (UTC+2)				Stadium: Instalación Deportiva Butarque

3 August 2022 Friendly	Alcorcón	1–2	Leganés	Alcorcón
20:00 CEST (UTC+2)				Stadium: Estadio Municipal de Santo Domingo

6 August 2022 Friendly	Leganés	1–2	Villarreal B	Leganés
21:00 CEST (UTC+2)				Stadium: Estadio Municipal de Butarque

== Competitions ==
=== Overall record ===
Competition	First match	Last match	Starting round	Final position	Record							
Competition	First match	Last match	Starting round	Final position	Pld	W	D	L	GF	GA	GD	Win %
Segunda División	13 August 2022	27 May 2023	Matchday 1	14th	42	14	11	17	37	42	−5	33.33
Copa del Rey	12 November 2022		First round	First round	1	0	1	0	0	0	+0	0.00
Total					43	14	12	17	37	42	−5	32.56

Source: Soccerway

=== Segunda División ===
==== League table ====
Pos	Team	Pld	W	D	L	GF	GA	GD	Pts
12	Racing Santander	42	14	12	16	39	40	−1	54 (Note: Burgos finished ahead of Racing Santander on head-to-head points: Racing Santander 0–1 Burgos, Burgos 2–1 Racing Santander.)
13	Zaragoza	42	12	17	13	40	39	+1	53 (Note: Zaragoza finished ahead of Leganés on head-to-head goal difference: Leganés 2–1 Zaragoza, Zaragoza 3–0 Leganés.)
14	Leganés	42	14	11	17	37	42	−5	53
15	Huesca	42	11	19	12	36	36	0	52 (Note: Huesca finished ahead of Mirandés on head-to-head points: Mirandés 1–1 Huesca, Huesca 1–0 Mirandés.)
16	Mirandés	42	13	13	16	48	54	−6	52

Source: LaLiga SmartBank
Rules for classification: 1) points; 2) head-to-head points; 3) head-to-head goal difference; 4) goal difference; 5) number of goals scored
Notes:

Notes

1. Reserve teams are not eligible for promotion to the same league as the first team.

==== Results summary ====
Overall								Home						Away					
Pld	W	D	L	GF	GA	GD	Pts	W	D	L	GF	GA	GD	W	D	L	GF	GA	GD
42	14	11	17	37	42	−5	53	10	6	5	23	19	+4	4	5	12	14	23	−9

Source: LaLiga SmartBank

==== Results by round ====
Round	1	2	3	4	5	6	7	8	9	10	11	12	13	14	15	16	17	18	19	20	21	22	23	24	25	26	27	28	29	30	31	32	33	34	35	36	37	38	39	40	41	42
Ground	H	A	A	H	A	H	A	H	A	H	A	H	H	A	H	A	H	A	H	A	H	H	A	H	A	H	A	H	A	H	A	H	A	H	A	H	A	A	H	A	H	A
Result	L	L	L	W	L	D	L	L	W	W	L	W	D	W	W	D	W	D	D	D	W	W	L	D	D	W	L	D	D	L	L	L	L	L	W	W	L	L	W	W	D	L
Position																																										

Source: LaLiga SmartBank
A = Away; H = Home; W = Win; D = Draw; L = Loss

==== Matches ====
The league fixtures were announced on 23 June 2022.

13 August 2022 1	Leganés	1–2	Alavés	Leganés
CEST (UTC+2)				Stadium: Estadio Municipal de Butarque

21 August 2022 2	Oviedo	1–0	Leganés	Oviedo
CEST (UTC+2)

27 August 2022 3	Lugo	1–0	Leganés	Lugo
CEST (UTC+2)

2 September 2022 4	Leganés	2–1	Eibar	Leganés
CEST (UTC+2)				Stadium: Estadio Municipal de Butarque

9 September 2022 5	Las Palmas	1–0	Leganés	Las Palmas
CEST (UTC+2)

18 September 2022 6	Leganés	0–0	Burgos	Leganés
CEST (UTC+2)				Stadium: Estadio Municipal de Butarque

24 September 2022 7	Huesca	1–0	Leganés	Huesca
CEST (UTC+2)

2 October 2022 8	Leganés	1–2	Albacete	Leganés
CEST (UTC+2)				Stadium: Estadio Municipal de Butarque

9 October 2022 9	Cartagena	1–2	Leganés	Cartagena
CEST (UTC+2)

12 October 2022 10	Leganés	1–0	Málaga	Leganés
CEST (UTC+2)				Stadium: Estadio Municipal de Butarque

16 October 2022 11	Levante	2–1	Leganés	Valencia
CEST (UTC+2)

23 October 2022 12	Leganés	2–1	Tenerife	Leganés
CEST (UTC+2)				Stadium: Estadio Municipal de Butarque

29 October 2022 13	Leganés	0–0	Racing Santander	Leganés
CEST (UTC+2)				Stadium: Estadio Municipal de Butarque

1 November 2022 14	Ibiza	0–2	Leganés	Ibiza
CET (UTC+1)

5 November 2022 15	Leganés	2–1	Ponferradina	Leganés
CET (UTC+1)				Stadium: Estadio Municipal de Butarque

19 November 2022 16	Sporting Gijón	2–2	Leganés	Gijón
CET (UTC+1)

27 November 2022 17	Leganés	1–0	Granada	Leganés
CET (UTC+1)				Stadium: Estadio Municipal de Butarque

3 December 2022 18	Villarreal B	0–0	Leganés	Villarreal
CET (UTC+1)

6 December 2022 19	Leganés	2–2	Mirandés	Leganés
CET (UTC+1)				Stadium: Estadio Municipal de Butarque

10 December 2022 20	Andorra	1–1	Leganés	Andorra
CET (UTC+1)

19 December 2022 21	Leganés	2–1	Zaragoza	Leganés
CET (UTC+1)				Stadium: Estadio Municipal de Butarque

6 January 2023 22	Leganés	1–0	Lugo	Leganés
CET (UTC+1)				Stadium: Estadio Municipal de Butarque

16 January 2023 23	Albacete	1–0	Leganés	Albacete
CET (UTC+1)

22 January 2023 24	Leganés	2–2	Levante	Leganés
CET (UTC+1)				Stadium: Estadio Municipal de Butarque

28 January 2023 25	Eibar	0–0	Leganés	Eibar
CET (UTC+1)

4 February 2023 26	Leganés	1–0	Sporting Gijón	Leganés
CET (UTC+1)				Stadium: Estadio Municipal de Butarque

13 February 2023 27	Racing Santander	2–1	Leganés	Santander
CET (UTC+1)
