= 2024–25 CD Leganés season =

CD Leganés
2024–25 season
- President: Jeff Luhnow
- Head coach: Borja Jiménez
- Stadium: Estadio Municipal de Butarque
- La Liga: 18th (relegated)
- Copa del Rey: Quarter-finals
- Top goalscorer: League: Dani Raba (8); All: Juan Cruz; Dani Raba (8 each)
- Highest home attendance: 12,530
- Average home league attendance: 11,135
Home colours	Away colours	Third colours

The 2024–25 season was the 97th season in the history of CD Leganés and the first in the top flight since 2020. In addition to the domestic league, the team participated in the Copa del Rey.

== Summary ==
On 14 June, as a result of gaining promotion, the purchase clause was activated for midfielder Darko Brašanac, who was loaned from Osasuna to continue for one year with the Madrid region club.

== Transfers ==
=== In ===
Pos.	Player	Transferred from	Fee	Date	Source
FW	(Spain) Miguel de la Fuente	(Spain) Alavés	€2,000,000	1 July 2024	
MF	(Spain) Juan Cruz	(Spain) Real Betis	€1,000,000	1 July 2024	
DF	(Spain) Enric Franquesa	(Spain) Levante	€90,000		
DF	(France) Valentin Rosier	(Turkey) Beşiktaş	Free	5 July 2024	
FW	(Spain) Roberto López	(Spain) Real Sociedad	Undisclosed	10 July 2024	
DF	(Ecuador) Jackson Porozo	(France) Troyes	Loan	23 August 2024	
DF	(Serbia) Matija Nastasić	(Spain) Mallorca	Undisclosed	30 August 2024	
FW	(Ivory Coast) Sébastien Haller	(Germany) Borussia Dortmund	Loan	30 August 2024	
FW	(Cape Verde) Luís Henriques de Barros Lopes	(Scotland) Aberdeen FC	Transfer	3 February 2025	
LB	(Croatia) Borna Barišić	(Turkey) Trabzonspor	Loan	3 February 2025	

Notes

1. ^{†} Loan transfer made permanent

=== Out ===
Pos.	Player	Transferred to	Fee	Date	Source
FW	(Ivory Coast) Sébastien Haller	(Germany) Borussia Dortmund	Loan return	8 January 2025	

== Friendlies ==
=== Pre-season ===
19 July 2024 Friendly	Nice	2–2	Leganés	Nice, France
10:30	Boga 18'; Brahimi 83'		García 38' (pen.); López 54'	Stadium: Stade de la Plaine du Var; Referee: Benoît Millot (France)

24 July 2024 Friendly	Leganés	1–2	Alcorcón	Leganés
09:30	Cissé 81' (pen.)		Llorente 67'; da Costa 69'	Stadium: Instalación Deportiva Butarque; Attendance: 1,200; Referee: Luis Enrique Morona del Campo

3 August 2024 Friendly	Sheffield Wednesday	0–0	Leganés	England
13:00 UTC+1

9 August 2024 Friendly	Oviedo	1–2	Leganés
18:30 UTC+2

10 August 2024 Friendly	Deportivo La Coruña	1–3	Leganés
21:00 UTC+2

==== Mid-season ====
4 September 2024 Friendly	Fuenlabrada	0–3	Leganés
19:00 UTC+2

== Competitions ==
=== Overall record ===
Competition	First match	Last match	Starting round	Final position	Record							
Competition	First match	Last match	Starting round	Final position	Pld	W	D	L	GF	GA	GD	Win %
La Liga	17 August 2024	24 May 2025	Matchday 1	18th	38	9	13	16	39	56	−17	23.68
Copa del Rey	30 October 2024	5 February 2025	First round	Quarter-finals	5	3	1	1	11	9	+2	60.00
Total					43	12	14	17	50	65	−15	27.91

Source: Soccerway

=== La Liga ===
==== League table ====
Pos	Team	Pld	W	D	L	GF	GA	GD	Pts	Qualification or relegation
16	Girona	38	11	8	19	44	60	−16	41 (Note: Girona finished ahead of Sevilla on head-to-head goal difference: Sevilla 0–2 Girona, Girona 1–2 Sevilla.)	
17	Sevilla	38	10	11	17	42	55	−13	41	
18	Leganés (R)	38	9	13	16	39	56	−17	40	Relegation to Segunda División
19	Las Palmas (R)	38	8	8	22	40	61	−21	32	Relegation to Segunda División
20	Valladolid (R)	38	4	4	30	26	90	−64	16	Relegation to Segunda División

Source: LaLiga EA Sports
Rules for classification: 1) Points; 2) Head-to-head points; 3) Head-to-head goal difference; 4) Goal difference; 5) Goals scored; 6) Fair-play points
(Note: Head-to-head record is used only after all the matches between the teams in question have been played)
(R) Relegated

==== Results summary ====
Overall								Home						Away					
Pld	W	D	L	GF	GA	GD	Pts	W	D	L	GF	GA	GD	W	D	L	GF	GA	GD
38	9	13	16	39	56	−17	40	7	4	8	23	27	−4	2	9	8	16	29	−13

Source: Soccerway

==== Results by round ====
Team ╲ Round	1	2	3	4	5	6	7	8	9	10	11	12	13	14	15	16	17	18	19	20	21	22	23	24	25	26	27	28	29	30	31	32	33	34
Ground	A	H	A	H	A	A	H	A	H	A	H	A	H	H	A	H	A	H	A	H	A	H	A	H	A	H	A	H	A	H	H	A	H	
Result	D	W	D	L	L	D	L	D	D	L	W	L	W	L	D	L	W	L	D	W	D	L	L	D	L	W	L	L	L	D	L	D	D	
Position	11	6	7	9	15	14	15	16	17	17	14	15	14	14	15	17	15	15	16	15	16	16	17	16	16	16	17	18	18	18	19	19	19	

Updated to match(es) played on 25 April 2025. Source: Soccerway
A = Away; H = Home; W = Win; D = Draw; L = Loss

==== Matches ====
The league schedule was released on 18 June 2024.

17 August 2024 1	Osasuna	1–1	Leganés	Pamplona
19:00	Juan Cruz (yellow card) 74'; Soriano 79' (o.g.); Herrando (yellow card) 82'; Moncayola (yellow card) 89'	Report	Cruz 22'; V.Rosier (yellow card) 31'; Soriano (yellow card) 61'	Stadium: El Sadar; Attendance: 19,561; Referee: Juan Luis Pulido Santana

25 August 2024 2	Leganés	2–1	Las Palmas	Leganés
19:00	Miguel (yellow card) 39'; Juan Cruz 71'; Franquesa 85'	Report	Kirian (yellow card) 45+2'; Sandro 90+3'	Stadium: Estadio Municipal de Butarque; Attendance: 10.052; Referee: Ricardo De Burgos Bengoetxea

28 August 2024 3	Valladolid	0–0	Leganés	Valladolid
19:00	S.Juric (yellow card) 90+4'	Report	Franquesa (yellow card) 17'; Neyou (yellow card) 46'; Sergio (yellow card) 69'; Sáenz (yellow card) 82'; Óscar (yellow card) 83'	Stadium: Estadio Municipal José Zorrilla; Attendance: 21.764; Referee: Alejandro Quintero González

31 August 2024 4	Leganés	0–1	Mallorca	Leganés
21:30 CEST (UTC+2)	Neyou (yellow card) 89'	Report	Rodríguez 43'; Morlanes (yellow card) 77'; Mascarell (yellow card) 85'; Navarro (yellow card) 90+2'	Stadium: Estadio Municipal de Butarque; Attendance: 10,482; Referee: Mario Melero López

13 September 2024 5	Real Betis	2–0	Leganés	Seville
21:00 CEST (UTC+2)	Adrián (yellow card) 41'; Ezzalzouli 74'; Vitor Roque 86'		Juan Cruz (yellow card) 11'; Rosier (yellow card) 37'	Stadium: Benito Villamarín; Attendance: 48,089; Referee: Pablo González Fuertes

19 September 2024 7	Leganés	0–2	Athletic Bilbao	Leganés
19:00 CEST (UTC+2)	Miguel (yellow card) 41'; Rosier (yellow card) 65'; Tapia (yellow card) 90'	Report	Vivian 63'; I.Williams 76'	Stadium: Estadio Municipal de Butarque; Attendance: 8,304; Referee: Francisco José Hernández Maeso

22 September 2024 6	Getafe	1–1	Leganés	Getafe
14:00 CEST (UTC+2)	Arambarri (yellow card) 53'; Djené (yellow card) 56'; Rico (yellow card) 63'; Borja Mayoral 83' (pen.)	Report	Óscar (yellow card) 20'; Jorge Sáenz 74'; Nastasic (yellow card) 80'	Stadium: Coliseum; Attendance: 13.060; Referee: Adrián Cordero Vega

28 September 2024 8	Rayo Vallecano	1–1	Leganés	Madrid
16:15 CEST (UTC+2)	Camello 8'; Rodríguez (yellow card) 57'; Embarba (yellow card) 90+4'	Report	Tapia (yellow card) 27'; Cruz 55'	Stadium: Vallecas Stadium; Attendance: 13,186; Referee: Alejandro Muñiz Ruiz

4 October 2024 9	Leganés	0–0	Valencia	Leganés
21:00 CEST (UTC+2)	Rosier (yellow card) 30'; Neyou (yellow card) 49'	Report	Tárrega (yellow card) 32'; Pepelu (yellow card) 67'	Stadium: Estadio Municipal de Butarque; Referee: Alejandro Quintero González

20 October 2024 10	Atlético Madrid	3–1	Leganés	Madrid
16:15 CEST (UTC+2)	Lenglet (yellow card) 30'; Sørloth 69', 90+9'; Galán (yellow card) 73'; Griezmann 81', (yellow card) 89'; Simeone (yellow card) 90+2'; De Paul (yellow card) 90+8'	Report	Neyou 34'; Cissé (yellow card) 80'	Stadium: Riyadh Air Metropolitano; Attendance: 60,122; Referee: José Luis Munuera Montero

27 October 2024 11	Leganés	3–0	Celta Vigo	Leganés
20:00	Diego 59'; Tapia (yellow card) 71'; Neyou (yellow card) 75'; Darko 78'; Sergio 82'	Report	Starfelt (yellow card) 62'; Mingueza (yellow card) 84'	Stadium: Butarque; Attendance: 11,358; Referee: Mario Melero López

2 November 2024 12	Girona	4–3	Leganés	Girona
16:15 CET (UTC+1)	Gutiérrez 21'; Martínez 31'; Stuani 62' (pen.); González 73' (o.g.); Gazzaniga (yellow card) 88'; Krejčí (yellow card) 89'; Romeu (yellow card) 90+2'	Report	Tapia 25'; Neyou (yellow card) 33'; Cruz 41'; Munir 77', (yellow card) 87'; Nastasić (yellow card) 81'; Óscar (yellow card) 90+8'	Stadium: Montilivi; Attendance: 10,839; Referee: Mateo Busquets Ferrer

10 November 2024 13	Leganés	1–0	Sevilla	Leganés
18:30 CET (UTC+1)	Sergio (yellow card) 41'; Cissé (yellow card) 69'; Miguel 82' (pen.)	Report	Agoumé (red card) 80'; Gudelj (yellow card) 87'	Stadium: Estadio Municipal de Butarque; Attendance: 11.167; Referee: Juan Luis Pulido Santana

24 November 2024 14	Leganés	0–3	Real Madrid	Leganés
18:30 UTC+1		Report	Mbappé 43'; Valverde 66'; Bellingham 85'	Stadium: Butarque; Attendance: 12,338; Referee: Javier Alberola Rojas

1 December 2024 15	Alavés	1–1	Leganés	Vitoria-Gasteiz
22:15 CET (UTC+1)	Abqar (yellow card) 80'; Carlos 87'	Report	Javi (yellow card) 27'; Óscar 67'; Borja (yellow card) 76'; Neyou (yellow card) 90+3'; Jorge Sáenz (yellow card) 90+4'; Tapia (yellow card) 90+6'	Stadium: Mendizorrotza; Attendance: 16,881; Referee: Isidro Díaz de Mera Escuderos

8 December 2024 16	Leganés	0–3	Real Sociedad	Leganés
14:00 CET (UTC+1)	Rosier (yellow card) 70'; Neyou (yellow card) 75'	Report	Méndez 14', (yellow card) 70'; Muñoz (yellow card) 27'; Barrenetxea 78'; Oyarzabal 90+2'	Stadium: Butarque; Attendance: 11,312; Referee: Pablo González Fuertes

15 December 2024 17	Barcelona	0–1	Leganés	Barcelona
21:00 CET (UTC+1)		Report	González 4'; Cissé (yellow card) 74'; Hernández (yellow card) 90+5'	Stadium: Estadi Olímpic Lluís Companys; Attendance: 39,523; Referee: Alejandro Quintero González

22 December 2024 18	Leganés	2–5	Villarreal	Leganés
18:30 CET (UTC+1)	Cissé 6'; Raba 33'; Óscar (red card) 58'; Sáenz (red card) 77'; Altimira (yellow card) 90+1'	Report	Barry 16', 45+2' (pen.), 65', (yellow card) 79'; Pino (yellow card) 58'; Gerard 90+2' (pen.); Cabanes 90+8'	Stadium: Butarque; Attendance: 11,034; Referee: Alejandro Muñiz Ruiz

11 January 2025 19	Espanyol	1–1	Leganés	Cornellà de Llobregat
17:30 CET (UTC+1)	Cabrera 2'; El Hilali (yellow card) 15'; Alex Král (yellow card) 15'	Report	Cissé 14'; Raba (yellow card) 45+1'; Brašanac (yellow card) 71'; Soriano (red card) 90+1'	Stadium: RCDE Stadium; Attendance: 26.606; Referee: Juan Martínez Munuera

18 January 2025 20	Leganés	1–0	Atlético Madrid	Leganés
16:15 CET (UTC+1)	Nastasić 49'; Neyou (yellow card) 90'	Report	Barrios (yellow card) 43'; Galán (yellow card) 57'; Lenglet (yellow card) 70'; Griezmann (penalty missed) 90'	Stadium: Estadio Municipal Butarque; Attendance: 12,371; Referee: Mario Melero López

26 January 2025 21	Athletic Bilbao	0–0	Leganés	Bilbao
18:30 CET (UTC+1)	Jauregizar (yellow card) 22'	Report	Altimira (yellow card) 28'	Stadium: San Mamés; Attendance: 47,612; Referee: Alejandro Hernández Hernández

31 January 2025 22	Leganés	0–1	Rayo Vallecano	Leganés
21:00 CET (UTC+1)	Raba (yellow card) 34'; Gónzalez (red card) 45+2'; Neyou (yellow card) 63'; Borja Jiménez (yellow card) 90'	Report	Nteka (yellow card) 54'; Ratiu (yellow card) 55'; López (yellow card) 75'; Pathé I. Ciss 78'; Embarba (yellow card) 89'	Stadium: Estadio Municipal de Butarque; Attendance: 11.432; Referee: Alejandro Quintero González (

9 February 2025 23	Valencia	2–0	Leganés	Valencia
16:15 CEST (UTC+2)	Barrenechea (yellow card) 25'; Mosquera 30'; Diakhaby 41'	Report	Neyou (yellow card) 23'; Borja Jiménez (yellow card) 59'	Stadium: Mestalla; Attendance: 42.314; Referee: Guillermo Cuadra Fernández

15 February 2025 24	Leganés	3–3	Alavés	Leganés
19:00 CEST (UTC+2)	Raba 10' (pen.), 37' (pen.), (yellow card) 65'; Brašanac (yellow card) 57'; Juan Cruz (yellow card) 67'; Duk (yellow card) 83'; Munir 88', (red card) 90+6'	Report	Diarra (yellow card) 9'; Manu Sánchez (yellow card) 18'; García 25'; Sivera (yellow card) 36'; Jordán 50' (pen.), 68'; Mouriño (yellow card) 59'; Abqar (yellow card) 90+10'	Stadium: Municipal de Butarque; Attendance: 10.681; Referee: Pablo González Fuertes

23 February 2025 25	Real Sociedad	3–0	Leganés	San Sebastián
21:00 CET (UTC+1)	Zakharyan 12'; Kubo 48', (yellow card) 61'; Aguerd (yellow card) 58'; Olasagasti (yellow card) 74', (goal) 80'	Report	Rosier (yellow card) 41'; Tapia (yellow card) 61'; Óscar (yellow card) 63'	Stadium: Reale Arena; Attendance: 22,533; Referee: Francisco José Hernández Maeso

2 March 2025 26	Leganés	1–0	Getafe	Leganés
14:00 CET (UTC+1)	Javi (yellow card) 71'; García 90+2'	Report	Arambarri (yellow card) 86'	Stadium: Municipal de Butarque; Attendance: 10.311; Referee: Juan Martínez Munuera

8 March 2024 27	Celta Vigo	2–1	Leganés	Vigo
14:00 CEST (UTC+2)	Mingueza 26', (yellow card) 90+3'; Alfon 45+1'; Damián (yellow card) 56'; Jailson (yellow card) 70'	Report	Nastasić (yellow card) 9'; Valentin 19'; Sáenz (yellow card) 76'	Stadium: Estadio ABANCA Balaídos; Attendance: 17.326; Referee: Isidro Díaz de Mera

16 March 2025 28	Leganés	2–3	Real Betis	Leganés
14:00 CEST (UTC+2)	Neyou (yellow card) 26'; Raba 29', 44'; Rosier (yellow card) 65'	Report	Perraud (yellow card) 38'; Isco 64' (pen.); Bakambu 78'; Hernández 82'	Stadium: Estadio Municipal de Butarque; Attendance: 11,691; Referee: César Soto Grado

30 March 2025 29	Real Madrid	3–2	Leganés	Madrid
21:00 UTC+1	Mbappé 32' (pen.), 76'; Bellingham 47'	Report	García 33'; Raba 41'	Stadium: Santiago Bernabéu; Attendance: 73,641; Referee: Pablo González Fuertes

7 April 2025 30	Leganés	1–1	Osasuna	Leganés
21:00 UTC+1	Neyou (yellow card) 55'; Rosier (yellow card) 61'; Raba (yellow card) 62', (goal) 87' (pen.)	Report	Oroz (yellow card) 45+1'; Herrando 49'; Moncayola (yellow card) 72'; Bretones (yellow card) 86'	Stadium: Estadio Municipal de Butarque; Attendance: 10.755; Referee: Víctor García Verdura

12 April 2025 31	Leganés	0–1	Barcelona	Leganés
21:00 CEST (UTC+2)	Altimira (yellow card) 7'; Raba (yellow card) 87'	Report	Sáenz 48' (o.g.); De Jong (yellow card) 87'	Stadium: Municipal de Butarque; Attendance: 12,530; Referee: Francisco José Hernández Maeso

19 April 2025 32	Mallorca	0–0	Leganés	Palma de Mallorca
18:30	Rodríguez (yellow card) 44'; Maffeo (yellow card) 59'	Report	Neyou (yellow card) 76'	Stadium: Son Moix; Attendance: 17.404; Referee: Alejandro Muñiz Ruiz

24 April 2025 33	Leganés	1-1	Girona	Leganés
19:00	Altimira (yellow card) 14'; Cissé (red card) 19'; Brašanac (yellow card) 51'; Óscar (yellow card) 74'; García (yellow card) 87'; Munir 90+2'		Stuani 54'; Gutiérrez (yellow card) 66'; Melo (yellow card) 75'	Stadium: Municipal de Butarque; Referee: José Munuera Montero

4 May 2025 34	Sevilla	2–2	Leganés	Seville

11 May 2025 35	Leganés	3–2	Espanyol	Leganés

14 May 2025 36	Villarreal	3–0	Leganés	Villarreal

18 May 2025 37	Las Palmas	0–1	Leganés	Las Palmas

24 May 2025 38	Leganés	3–0	Valladolid	Leganés

=== Copa del Rey ===
30 October 2024 First round	Ciudad de Lucena	1–2	Leganés	Lucena
19:00 UTC+1	Iván Vela (yellow card) 41'; Agudo 45+1'; Morillo (yellow card) 71'; Javier Hervás (yellow card) 90+3'	Report	Porozo (yellow card) 27'; El Haddadi 42'; Cruz 52'	Stadium: Estadio Ciudad de Lucena; Attendance: 2.600; Referee: Javier Alberola Rojas

4 December 2024 Second round	Estepona	2–2 (a.e.t.) (4–5 p)	Leganés	Estepona
21:00	Mesa 25'; Riera (yellow card) 40'; Carrasco (yellow card) 42'; Orobio 60'; Liceras (yellow card) 80'	Report	Munir 47'; Hernández (yellow card) 83', (goal) 87'; Óscar (yellow card) 104'	Stadium: Francisco Muñoz Pérez; Attendance: 4.000; Referee: Francisco Hernández Maeso
	Penalties
	H. Rodríguez (penalty scored); Dago (penalty missed); García (penalty scored); Goma (penalty scored); Caro (penalty scored)		(penalty scored) Óscar; (penalty scored) Tapia; (penalty scored) García; (penalty scored) Munir; (penalty scored) Cruz

5 January 2025 Round of 32	Cartagena	1–2	Leganés	Cartagena
15:30	Luis Muñoz 17'	Report	El Haddadi 28'; Rosier (yellow card) 42'; Raba 51'	Stadium: Cartagonova; Referee: Víctor García Verdura

15 January 2025 Round of 16	Almería	2–3	Leganés	Almería
19:30	Suárez 38'; Lázaro 52'; Centelles (yellow card) 78'	Report	Altimira 33'; Cissé (yellow card) 43'; Miguel 76' (pen.); Raba (yellow card) 81'; García 86'; Nastasić (yellow card) 90+5'	Stadium: UD Almería Stadium; Referee: Ricardo De Burgos Bengoetxea

5 February 2025 Quarter-finals	Leganés	2–3	Real Madrid	Leganés
21:00 UTC+1	Cruz 39' (pen.), 59'; Sergio Gónzalez (yellow card) 67'	Report	Modrić 18'; Endrick 25'; Jacobo Ramón (yellow card) 79'; Vinícius (yellow card) 82'; Modrić (yellow card) 87'; G. García 90+3'	Stadium: Butarque; Attendance: 11,709; Referee: Javier Alberola Rojas
