= Enric Franquesa =

Spanish footballer

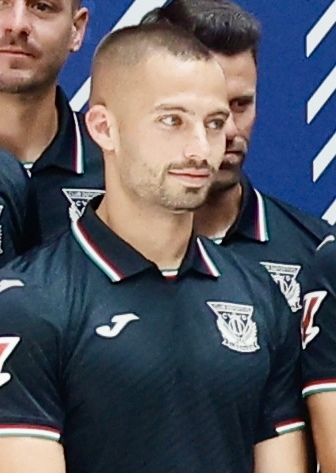
- Franquesa with Leganés in 2024

Personal information
- Full name: Enric Franquesa Dolz
- Date of birth: 26 February 1997 (age 29)
- Place of birth: Sant Cugat, Spain
- Height: 1.74 m (5 ft 9 in)
- Position: Left-back

Team information
- Current team: Leganés
- Number: 15

Youth career
- Júnior
- 2006–2016: Barcelona

Senior career*
| Years | Team | Apps | (Gls) |
| 2016–2017 | Barcelona B | 1 | (0) |
| 2016–2017 | → Sabadell (loan) | 8 | (0) |
| 2017 | → Gavà (loan) | 16 | (0) |
| 2017–2021 | Villarreal B | 43 | (5) |
| 2019–2020 | → Mirandés (loan) | 23 | (0) |
| 2020–2021 | → Girona (loan) | 27 | (3) |
| 2021–2024 | Levante | 27 | (0) |
| 2023–2024 | → Leganés (loan) | 54 | (2) |
| 2024– | Leganés | 40 | (1) |
- * Club domestic league appearances and goals as of 19 November 2026

Enric Franquesa Dolz (born 26 February 1997) is a Spanish professional footballer who plays as a left-back for CD Leganés.

== Career ==
Born in Sant Cugat del Vallès, Barcelona, Catalonia, Franquesa joined FC Barcelona's La Masia in 2006 from hometown side Club Junior 1917. He made his senior debut with the reserves on 27 March 2016, coming on as a late substitute for goalscorer Alberto Perea in a 2–0 Segunda División B away defeat of CD Llosetense.

On 21 July 2016, Franquesa was loaned to CE Sabadell FC in the third division, for one year. The following 19 January, after appearing sparingly, he moved to fellow league team CF Gavà also in a temporary deal.

In June 2017, Franquesa agreed to a contract with Villarreal CF, being initially assigned to the B-team still in division three. On 25 April 2019, he signed a contract extension until 2022.

On 25 July 2019, Franquesa was loaned to Segunda División newcomers CD Mirandés, for one year. He made his professional debut on 17 August, starting in a 2–2 away draw against Rayo Vallecano.

On 27 August 2020, Franquesa agreed to a one-year loan deal with second division side Girona FC. On 2 July of the following year, he agreed to a four-year deal with La Liga side Levante UD.

Franquesa made his top tier debut on 22 August 2021, playing the last four minutes in a 3–3 home draw against Real Madrid. On 19 January 2023, he was loaned to CD Leganés until June.

On 24 July 2023, Franquesa's loan with Lega was extended for the entire 2023–24 season. After helping in their promotion to the top tier as champions, he signed a permanent two-year deal on 13 June 2024.

== Career statistics ==
As of match played on 7 November 2026

Appearances and goals by club, season and competition
| Club | Season | League | | | National cup | | Other | | Total | |
| Club | Season | Division | Apps | Goals | Apps | Goals | Apps | Goals | Apps | Goals |
|---|---|---|---|---|---|---|---|---|---|---|
| Barcelona B | 2015–16 | Segunda División B | 1 | 0 | — | | — | | 1 | 0 |
| Sabadell (loan) | 2016–17 | Segunda División B | 8 | 0 | 0 | 0 | — | | 8 | 0 |
| Gavà (loan) | 2016–17 | Segunda División B | 16 | 0 | 0 | 0 | — | | 16 | 0 |
| Villarreal B | 2017–18 | Segunda División B | 24 | 1 | — | | 1 (Note: Appearance(s) in Promotion Playoffs) | 0 | 25 | 1 |
| Villarreal B | 2018–19 | Segunda División B | 19 | 4 | — | | 1 | 0 | 20 | 4 |
| Villarreal B | Total | | 43 | 5 | 0 | 0 | 2 | 0 | 45 | 5 |
| Mirandés (loan) | 2019–20 | Segunda División | 23 | 0 | 4 | 0 | — | | 27 | 0 |
| Girona (loan) | 2020–21 | Segunda División | 27 | 3 | 3 | 0 | 4 (Note: Appearances in the 2021 Segunda División play-offs) | 1 | 34 | 4 |
| Levante | 2021–22 | La Liga | 16 | 0 | 2 | 0 | — | | 18 | 0 |
| Levante | 2022–23 | Segunda División | 11 | 0 | 2 | 0 | — | | 13 | 0 |
| Levante | Total | | 27 | 0 | 4 | 0 | 0 | 0 | 31 | 0 |
| Leganés (loan) | 2022–23 | Segunda División | 13 | 0 | 0 | 0 | — | | 13 | 0 |
| Leganés (loan) | 2023–24 | Segunda División | 41 | 2 | 0 | 0 | — | | 41 | 2 |
| Leganés | 2024–25 | La Liga | 12 | 1 | 1 | 0 | — | | 13 | 1 |
| Leganés | 2025–26 | Segunda División | 23 | 0 | 1 | 0 | — | | 24 | 0 |
| Leganés | 2026–27 | Segunda División | 5 | 0 | 0 | 0 | — | | 5 | 0 |
| Leganés | Total | | 94 | 3 | 2 | 0 | 0 | 0 | 96 | 3 |
| Career total | | | 239 | 11 | 13 | 0 | 6 | 1 | 258 | 12 |

== Honours ==
Leganés

- Segunda División: 2023–24
