= 2019–20 RC Celta de Vigo season =

Celta Vigo
2019–20 season
- President: Carlos Mouriño
- Head coach: Fran Escribá (until 3 November); Óscar García (from 4 November)
- Stadium: Balaídos
- La Liga: 17th
- Copa del Rey: Round of 32
- Top goalscorer: League: Iago Aspas (14); All: Iago Aspas (14)
- Highest home attendance: 23,614 (vs Real Madrid, 17 August 2019)
- Lowest home attendance: 11,932 (vs Osasuna, 5 January 2020)
- Average home league attendance: 17,619
- Biggest win: Celta Vigo 6–0 Alavés
- Biggest defeat: Mallorca 5–1 Celta Vigo
Home colours	Away colours	Third colours

The 2019–20 season was Real Club Celta de Vigo's 96th season in existence and the club's 8th consecutive season in the top flight of Spanish football. In addition to the domestic league, Celta Vigo participated in this season's edition of the Copa del Rey. The season was slated to cover a period from 1 July 2019 to 30 June 2020. It was extended extraordinarily beyond 30 June due to the COVID-19 pandemic in Spain. In the end, the Galicians managed to stay in the La Liga by one point, after it was threatened with a humiliating relegation to the LaLiga SmartBank.

== Players ==
=== Squad ===
As of 18 June 2020

Note: Flags indicate national team as defined under FIFA eligibility rules; some limited exceptions apply. Players may hold more than one non-FIFA nationality.

No.	Pos.	Nation	Player
1	GK	ESP	Sergio (3rd captain)
2	DF	ESP	Hugo Mallo (captain)
3	FW	ESP	Nolito
4	DF	MEX	Néstor Araujo
5	MF	TUR	Okay Yokuşlu
6	MF	ESP	Denis Suárez
7	FW	ESP	Juan Hernández
8	MF	ESP	Fran Beltrán
9	FW	RUS	Fyodor Smolov (on loan from Lokomotiv Moscow)
10	FW	ESP	Iago Aspas (vice-captain)
11	MF	DEN	Pione Sisto
12	MF	BRA	Rafinha (on loan from Barcelona)
13	GK	ESP	Rubén Blanco

No.	Pos.	Nation	Player
14	MF	CRO	Filip Bradarić (on loan from Cagliari)
15	DF	URU	Lucas Olaza (on loan from Boca Juniors)
16	DF	ESP	Jorge (on loan from Valencia)
17	DF	ESP	David Juncà
18	DF	GHA	Joseph Aidoo
19	FW	URU	Gabriel Fernández
20	DF	ESP	Kevin
21	DF	COL	Jeison Murillo (on loan from Sampdoria)
22	FW	ESP	Santi Mina
23	MF	ESP	Brais Méndez
24	MF	ESP	Pape Cheikh (on loan from Lyon)
25	GK	ESP	Iván Villar

=== Reserve team ===
Note: Flags indicate national team as defined under FIFA eligibility rules; some limited exceptions apply. Players may hold more than one non-FIFA nationality.

No.	Pos.	Nation	Player
28	MF	ESP	Sergio Bermejo
31	DF	ESP	José Fontán

No.	Pos.	Nation	Player
32	DF	ESP	Sergio Carreira
36	FW	ESP	Iker Losada

=== Out on loan ===
Note: Flags indicate national team as defined under FIFA eligibility rules; some limited exceptions apply. Players may hold more than one non-FIFA nationality.

No.	Pos.	Nation	Player
—	DF	SVK	Róbert Mazáň (at Tenerife until 30 June 2020)
—	MF	ESP	Jozabed (at Girona until 30 June 2020)

No.	Pos.	Nation	Player
—	DF	ESP	David Costas (at Almería until 30 June 2020)
—	FW	TUR	Emre Mor (at Olympiacos until 30 June 2020)

== Transfers ==
=== In ===
Date	Player	From	Type	Fee	Ref
30 June 2019	(Guadeloupe) Claudio Beauvue	(France) Caen	Loan return		
30 June 2019	(Germany) Dennis Eckert	(Netherlands) Excelsior	Loan return		
30 June 2019	(Slovakia) Róbert Mazáň	(Italy) Venezia	Loan return		
30 June 2019	(Argentina) Facundo Roncaglia	Valencia	Loan return		
1 July 2019	(Uruguay) Gabriel Fernández	(Uruguay) Peñarol	Transfer	€3.5M	
1 July 2019	(Spain) Denis Suárez	Barcelona	Transfer	€12.9M	
11 July 2019	(Ghana) Joseph Aidoo	(Belgium) Genk	Transfer	€8M	
14 July 2019	(Spain) Santi Mina (Note: Permanent transfer)	Valencia	Trade	Maxi Gómez	
14 July 2019	(Spain) Jorge Sáenz (Note: On loan until 30 June 2020)	Valencia	Trade	Maxi Gómez	
14 August 2019	(Spain) Pape Cheikh Diop	(France) Lyon	Loan	€500K	
2 September 2019	(Brazil) Rafinha	Barcelona	Loan	€1.5M	
18 June 2020	(Spain) Nolito	Sevilla	Transfer	Free	

=== Out ===
Date	Player	To	Type	Fee	Ref
30 June 2019	(Algeria) Ryad Boudebouz	Real Betis	Loan return		
30 June 2019	(Morocco) Sofiane Boufal	(England) Southampton	Loan return		
30 June 2019	(Netherlands) Wesley Hoedt	(England) Southampton	Loan return		
1 July 2019	(Argentina) Gustavo Cabral	(Mexico) Pachuca	Transfer	Free	
10 July 2019	(Denmark) Mathias Jensen	(England) Brentford	Transfer	€3.8M	
12 July 2019	(Denmark) Andrew Hjulsager	(Belgium) Oostende	Transfer	€500K	
14 July 2019	(Uruguay) Maxi Gómez	Valencia	Trade	€14.5M + Santi Mina + Jorge Sáenz	
24 July 2019	(Slovakia) Róbert Mazáň	Tenerife	Loan		
31 July 2019	(Turkey) Emre Mor	(Turkey) Galatasaray	Loan	€300K	
8 August 2019	(Argentina) Facundo Roncaglia	Osasuna	Transfer	€250K	
21 August 2019	(Serbia) Nemanja Radoja	Levante	Transfer	Free	
27 August 2019	(Spain) Jozabed	Girona	Loan		
2 September 2019	(Germany) Dennis Eckert	(Germany) FC Ingolstadt	Transfer	Free	

== Pre-season and friendlies ==
Win Draw Loss

20 July 2019 Friendly	Celta Vigo	3–0	Lugo	Portonovo, Spain
20:30 CEST (UTC+2)	Pita 3' (o.g.); Mina 51'; Aspas 78' (pen.)	Report		Stadium: Campo de Baltar

27 July 2019 Friendly	Celta Vigo	1–0	Lille	Vilagarcía de Arousa, Spain
20:30 CEST (UTC+2)	Kevin (yellow card) 52'; Sisto 73'	Report	Soumaoro (yellow card) 36'	Stadium: Estadio Municipal A Lomba

3 August 2019 Friendly	Union Berlin	0–3	Celta Vigo	Berlin, Germany
16:00 CEST (UTC+2)		Report	Méndez 22'; Mina 57'; Jorge 82'	Stadium: Stadion An der Alten Försterei; Attendance: 11,032

6 August 2019 Friendly	Celta Vigo	0–1	Tenerife	Melgaço, Portugal
20:00 WEST (UTC+1)		Report	Malbašić 65'	Stadium: Centro de Estágios de Melgaço

10 August 2019 Trofeo Memorial Quinocho	Celta Vigo	1–2	Lazio	Vigo, Spain
20:00 CEST (UTC+2)	Beltrán 39'	Report	Immobile 7', 25'	Stadium: Balaídos; Referee: Pablo González Fuertes (Spain)

6 September 2019 Friendly	Celta Vigo	1–1	Famalicão	Vigo, Spain
11:30 CEST (UTC+2)	Sisto	Report		Stadium: Balaídos

== Competitions ==
=== Overview ===
Competition	First match	Last match	Starting round	Final position	Record							
Competition	First match	Last match	Starting round	Final position	Pld	W	D	L	GF	GA	GD	Win %
La Liga	17 August 2019	19 July 2020	Matchday 1	17th	38	7	16	15	37	49	−12	18.42
Copa del Rey	19 December 2019	23 January 2020	First round	Round of 32	3	2	0	1	7	3	+4	66.67
Total					41	9	16	16	44	52	−8	21.95

Last updated: 19 July 2020
Source: Soccerway

=== La Liga ===
==== League table ====
Pos	Team	Pld	W	D	L	GF	GA	GD	Pts	Qualification or relegation
15	Real Betis	38	10	11	17	48	60	−12	41	
16	Alavés	38	10	9	19	34	59	−25	39	
17	Celta Vigo	38	7	16	15	37	49	−12	37	
18	Leganés (R)	38	8	12	18	30	51	−21	36	Relegation to Segunda División
19	Mallorca (R)	38	9	6	23	40	65	−25	33	Relegation to Segunda División

Source: La Liga, Soccerway
Rules for classification: 1) Points; 2) Head-to-head points; 3) Head-to-head goal difference; 4) Goal difference; 5) Goals scored; 6) Fair-play points (Note: Head-to-head record is used only after all the matches between the teams in question have been played)
(R) Relegated

==== Results summary ====
Overall								Home						Away					
Pld	W	D	L	GF	GA	GD	Pts	W	D	L	GF	GA	GD	W	D	L	GF	GA	GD
38	7	16	15	37	49	−12	37	5	8	6	22	20	+2	2	8	9	15	29	−14

Last updated: 19 July 2020.
Source: La Liga

==== Results by round ====
Round	1	2	3	4	5	6	7	8	9	10	11	12	13	14	15	16	17	18	19	20	21	22	23	24	25	26	27	28	29	30	31	32	33	34	35	36	37	38
Ground	H	H	A	H	A	H	A	H	A	H	A	H	A	A	H	A	H	A	H	A	H	A	H	A	H	A	A	H	A	H	A	H	A	H	H	A	H	A
Result	L	W	D	L	D	D	L	W	L	L	L	L	L	W	D	L	D	L	D	D	D	L	W	D	W	D	D	L	D	W	W	D	L	D	D	L	L	D
Position	19	12	12	16	16	15	17	15	17	17	18	18	18	18	18	18	18	18	17	18	18	19	17	17	17	17	17	17	17	16	16	17	17	16	16	16	17	17

Updated to match(es) played on 19 July 2020. Source: La Liga
A = Away; H = Home; W = Win; D = Draw; L = Loss

==== Matches ====
The La Liga schedule was announced on 4 July 2019.

17 August 2019 1	Celta Vigo	1–3	Real Madrid	Vigo
17:00 CEST (UTC+2)	Kevin (yellow card) 7'; Blanco (yellow card) 12'; Aspas (yellow card) 15'; Fernández (yellow card) 49'; Costas (yellow card) 74'; Losada 90+1'	Report	Benzema 12'; Vinícius (yellow card) 36'; Modrić (red card) 56'; Kroos 61'; Odriozola (yellow card) 64'; Vázquez 80'	Stadium: Balaídos; Attendance: 23,614; Referee: Xavier Estrada Fernández

24 August 2019 2	Celta Vigo	1–0	Valencia	Vigo
21:00 CEST (UTC+2)	Fernández 15'; Olaza (yellow card) 48'	Report	Gayà (yellow card) 62'; Parejo (yellow card) 90+1'	Stadium: Balaídos; Attendance: 20,065; Referee: Alejandro Hernández Hernández

30 August 2019 3	Sevilla	1–1	Celta Vigo	Seville
20:00 CEST (UTC+2)	Munir (yellow card) 34'; Carlos (yellow card) 54'; Fernando (yellow card) 78'; Vázquez 81'; Gil (yellow card) 85'	Report	Kevin (yellow card) 24'; Méndez (yellow card) 45+3'; Suárez 84'	Stadium: Ramón Sánchez Pizjuán; Attendance: 37,787; Referee: Carlos del Cerro Grande

15 September 2019 4	Celta Vigo	0–2	Granada	Vigo
16:00 CEST (UTC+2)	Jorge (red card) 11'; Beltrán (red card) 29'; Mina (yellow card) 39'; Suárez (yellow card) 45'; Mallo (yellow card) 62'; Araujo (yellow card) 74'	Report	Germán (yellow card) 19', (goal) 45+6'; Díaz (yellow card) 44'; Herrera 54'	Stadium: Balaídos; Attendance: 18,259; Referee: Eduardo Prieto Iglesias

21 September 2019 5	Atlético Madrid	0–0	Celta Vigo	Madrid
18:30 CEST (UTC+2)	Koke (yellow card) 76'; Saúl (yellow card) 81'; Costa (yellow card) 90+6'	Report	Aidoo (yellow card) 45+2'; Aspas (yellow card) 63'; Blanco (yellow card) 77'; Diop (yellow card) 90+1'; Olaza (yellow card) 90+6'	Stadium: Wanda Metropolitano; Attendance: 57,701; Referee: Mario Melero López

26 September 2019 6	Celta Vigo	1–1	Espanyol	Vigo
20:00 CEST (UTC+2)	Lobotka (yellow card) 44'; Aspas (yellow card) 90+2'; Mina 90+5'	Report	Calero (yellow card) 32'; Pedrosa 48'; Naldo (yellow card) 70'; Pipa (yellow card) 73'; Sánchez (yellow card) 80'; Calleri (yellow card) 87'	Stadium: Balaídos; Attendance: 16,663; Referee: José María Sánchez Martínez

29 September 2019 7	Eibar	2–0	Celta Vigo	Eibar
14:00 CEST (UTC+2)	Arbilla (yellow card) 19'; Orellana (yellow card) 34', (goal) 60'; Expósito 47'; Álvarez (yellow card) 90+3'	Report	Olaza (yellow card) 22'	Stadium: Ipurua Municipal Stadium; Attendance: 5,531; Referee: Juan Martínez Munuera

6 October 2019 8	Celta Vigo	1–0	Athletic Bilbao	Vigo
14:00 CEST (UTC+2)	Aspas 74'	Report	Balenziaga (yellow card) 21'; R. García (yellow card) 40'; Yeray (yellow card) 77'; Martínez (yellow card) 78'; Capa (yellow card) 85'	Stadium: Balaídos; Attendance: 19,962; Referee: David Medié Jiménez

20 October 2019 9	Alavés	2–0	Celta Vigo	Vitoria-Gasteiz
12:00 CEST (UTC+2)	Wakaso (yellow card) 31'; Duarte (yellow card) 38'; García (yellow card) 45+4'; Magallán 50', (yellow card) 90'; Pérez 82', (yellow card) 90+3'	Report	Juncà (yellow card) 26'	Stadium: Mendizorrotza; Attendance: 16,584; Referee: José Luis González González

27 October 2019 10	Celta Vigo	0–1	Real Sociedad	Vigo
12:00 CET (UTC+1)	Mallo (yellow card) 56'; Diop (yellow card) 60' (yellow-red card) 66'; Aspas (yellow card) 77'; Jorge (yellow card) 90+3'	Report	Zubeldia (yellow card) 71'; Isak 82'; Oyarzabal (yellow card) 87'	Stadium: Balaídos; Attendance: 18,002; Referee: Valentín Pizarro Gómez

30 October 2019 11	Real Betis	2–1	Celta Vigo	Seville
21:00 CET (UTC+1)	Emerson 8', (yellow card) 80'; Feddal (yellow card) 50'; Guardado (yellow card) 64'; Ismael (yellow card) 67'; Iglesias (yellow card) 69'; Fekir 90'; Robles (yellow card) 90+3'	Report	Aspas 69' (pen.); Araujo (yellow card) 90+2'	Stadium: Benito Villamarín; Attendance: 42,578; Referee: Jesús Gil Manzano

3 November 2019 12	Celta Vigo	0–1	Getafe	Vigo
18:30 CET (UTC+1)	Araujo (yellow card) 59'; Aidoo (yellow card) 63'; Diop (yellow card) 76'	Report	Kenedy 37'; Timor (yellow card) 41'; Arambarri (yellow card) 46'; Etxeita (yellow card) 71'	Stadium: Balaídos; Attendance: 14,704; Referee: Antonio Mateu Lahoz

9 November 2019 13	Barcelona	4–1	Celta Vigo	Barcelona
21:00 CET (UTC+1)	Messi 23' (pen.), 45+1', 48', (yellow card) 40'; Umtiti (yellow card) 25'; Roberto (yellow card) 52'; Busquets 85', (yellow card) 88'	Report	Olaza 42'; Beltrán (yellow card) 45'	Stadium: Camp Nou; Attendance: 71,209; Referee: Guillermo Cuadra Fernández

24 November 2019 14	Villarreal	1–3	Celta Vigo	Villarreal
18:30 CET (UTC+1)	Iborra (yellow card) 11'; Chukwueze 59'; Funes Mori (yellow card) 67'; Torres (yellow card) 79'	Report	Sisto 54'; Sergio (yellow card) 74'; Aspas 79', 90+4'; Mina (yellow card) 90+1'	Stadium: Estadio de la Cerámica; Attendance: 17,352; Referee: José Luis Munuera Montero

29 November 2019 15	Celta Vigo	0–0	Valladolid	Vigo
21:00 CET (UTC+1)	Mallo (yellow card) 49'	Report	Joaquín (yellow card) 45'; Guardiola (yellow card) 66'; Rubio (yellow card) 90+1'	Stadium: Balaídos; Attendance: 16,918; Referee: Javier Alberola Rojas

8 December 2019 16	Leganés	3–2	Celta Vigo	Leganés
18:30 CET (UTC+1)	Recio (yellow card) 5'; Óscar 15', 39'; Pérez (yellow card) 42'; Tarín (yellow card) 49'; Rodrigues 55'	Report	Yokuşlu (yellow card) 30'; Fernández (yellow card) 49' (yellow-red card) 71'; Araujo 64'; Aspas 81', (yellow card) 90+4'	Stadium: Estadio Municipal de Butarque; Attendance: 7,115; Referee: José María Sánchez Martínez

15 December 2019 17	Celta Vigo	2–2	Mallorca	Vigo
14:00 CET (UTC+1)	Rafinha 20'; Aidoo (yellow card) 33'; Aspas 49' (pen.); Araujo (yellow card) 57'; Mina (yellow card) 74'	Report	Sevilla 33' (pen.); Budimir (yellow card) 45+4', (goal) 83'; Raíllo (yellow card) 65' (yellow-red card) 78'; Hernández (yellow card) 71'; Reina (yellow card) 79'	Stadium: Balaídos; Attendance: 13,317; Referee: Ricardo de Burgos Bengoetxea

22 December 2019 18	Levante	3–1	Celta Vigo	Valencia
18:30 CET (UTC+1)	Roger (yellow card) 21', (goal) 60', 70'; Bardhi (yellow card) 47'; Mayoral 90+1', (yellow card) 90+2'	Report	Aspas 12', (yellow card) 72'; Yokuşlu (yellow card) 18'; Mina (yellow card) 26'; Aidoo (yellow card) 65'; Méndez (yellow card) 71'; Araujo (yellow card) 72'	Stadium: Estadi Ciutat de València; Attendance: 18,653; Referee: Eduardo Prieto Iglesias

5 January 2020 19	Celta Vigo	1–1	Osasuna	Vigo
21:00 CET (UTC+1)	Kevin (yellow card) 24'; Beltrán (yellow card) 62'; Mina 75'; Rafinha (yellow card) 82'	Report	Estupiñán (yellow card) 47'; Brašanac (yellow card) 52'; Oier (yellow card) 76'; Ávila 83'	Stadium: Balaídos; Attendance: 11,932; Referee: Guillermo Cuadra Fernández

19 January 2020 20	Athletic Bilbao	1–1	Celta Vigo	Bilbao
18:30 CET (UTC+1)	Capa (yellow card) 13'; López (yellow card) 19'; Berchiche (yellow card) 27'; R. García 76' (pen.); Martínez (yellow card) 83'	Report	Araujo (yellow card) 23'; Rafinha 56'; Blanco (yellow card) 73'; Kevin (yellow card) 90+3'	Stadium: San Mamés Stadium; Attendance: 41,549; Referee: David Medié Jiménez

26 January 2020 21	Celta Vigo	0–0	Eibar	Vigo
14:00 CET (UTC+1)	Aspas (yellow card) 63'	Report		Stadium: Balaídos; Attendance: 15,490; Referee: José Luis González González

1 February 2020 22	Valencia	1–0	Celta Vigo	Valencia
21:00 CET (UTC+1)	Gabriel (yellow card) 20'; Wass (yellow card) 33'; Florenzi (yellow card) 50'; Soler 77'; Gómez (yellow card) 80'; Coquelin (yellow card) 90+1'; Doménech (yellow card) 90+3'	Report	Kevin (yellow card) 40'; Rafinha (yellow card) 65'; Sisto (yellow card) 89'	Stadium: Mestalla; Attendance: 39,637; Referee: Pablo González Fuertes

9 February 2020 23	Celta Vigo	2–1	Sevilla	Vigo
18:30 CET (UTC+1)	Murillo (yellow card) 51'; Aspas 78'; Mallo (yellow card) 79'; Smolov (yellow card) 80'; Sisto 90+1'	Report	En-Nesyri 23'; Diego Carlos (yellow card) 63'; Escudero (yellow card) 90+4'	Stadium: Balaídos; Attendance: 20,375; Referee: Santiago Jaime Latre

16 February 2020 24	Real Madrid	2–2	Celta Vigo	Madrid
21:00 CET (UTC+1)	Kroos 52'; Ramos 65' (pen.); Bale (yellow card) 72'; Carvajal (yellow card) 74'	Report	Smolov 7'; Olaza (yellow card) 57'; Yokuşlu (yellow card) 76'; Mina 85'	Stadium: Santiago Bernabéu; Attendance: 62,447; Referee: Javier Alberola Rojas

22 February 2020 25	Celta Vigo	1–0	Leganés	Vigo
13:00 CET (UTC+1)	Bradarić (red card) 21'; Suárez (yellow card) 26'; Murillo (yellow card) 31'; Aspas 62'	Report	Silva (yellow card) 14'; Siovas (yellow card) 24'; Óscar (yellow card) 62'	Stadium: Balaídos; Attendance: 19,335; Referee: José Luis Munuera Montero

29 February 2020 26	Granada	0–0	Celta Vigo	Granada
21:00 CET (UTC+1)	Vico (yellow card) 42'; Herrera (yellow card) 54'; Soldado (yellow card) 79'	Report	Araujo (yellow card) 23'; Sisto (yellow card) 52'; Aspas (yellow card) 60'; Mallo (yellow card) 73'; Sergio (yellow card) 75'	Stadium: Nuevo Los Cármenes; Attendance: 15,906; Referee: Guillermo Cuadra Fernández

7 March 2020 27	Getafe	0–0	Celta Vigo	Getafe
21:00 CET (UTC+1)	Cucurella (yellow card) 45+1'; Maksimović (yellow card) 54'; Arambarri (yellow card) 55' (yellow-red card) 82'; Mata (yellow card) 61'; Suárez (yellow card) 72'	Report	Araujo (yellow card) 32'; Mallo (yellow card) 57'; Blanco (yellow card) 60'; Smolov (yellow card) 75'; Fernández (yellow card) 81'	Stadium: Coliseum Alfonso Pérez; Attendance: 11,042; Referee: José María Sánchez Martínez

13 June 2020 28	Celta Vigo	0–1	Villarreal	Vigo
17:00 CEST (UTC+2)	Diop (yellow card) 40'	Report	Iborra (yellow card) 37'; Trigueros 90+1'	Stadium: Balaídos; Attendance: 0 Referee: Valentín Pizarro Gómez
Note: The match was originally scheduled for 14 March, but was postponed due to the COVID-19 pandemic, and rescheduled to 13 June. It was played behind closed doors.

17 June 2020 29	Valladolid	0–0	Celta Vigo	Valladolid
19:30 CEST (UTC+2)	Joaquín (yellow card) 50'; Alcaraz (yellow card) 59'; Rubio (yellow card) 90+1'	Report	Yokuşlu (yellow card) 31'; Smolov (yellow card) 35'; Murillo (yellow card) 61'	Stadium: José Zorrilla; Attendance: 0 Referee: Jesús Gil Manzano
Note: The match was originally scheduled for 21 March, but was postponed due to the 2020 coronavirus pandemic, and rescheduled to 17 June. It was played behind closed doors.

21 June 2020 30	Celta Vigo	6–0	Alavés	Vigo
14:00 CEST (UTC+2)	Murillo 14'; Yokuşlu (yellow card) 16'; Aspas 20' (pen.); Rafinha 40', 41'; Nolito 78' (pen.); Mina 86'	Report	Pérez (yellow card) 15'; Aguirregabiria (red card) 27'	Stadium: Balaídos; Attendance: 0 Referee: Adrián Cordero Vega
Note: The match was originally scheduled for 5 April, but was postponed due to the 2020 coronavirus pandemic, and rescheduled to 21 June. It was played behind closed doors.

24 June 2020 31	Real Sociedad	0–1	Celta Vigo	San Sebastián
19:30 CEST (UTC+2)	Monreal (yellow card) 21'; Llorente (yellow card) 44'; Zubimendi (yellow card) 55'; Januzaj (yellow card) 90+4'	Report	Aspas 45' (pen.); Rafinha (yellow card) 59'; Smolov (yellow card) 90'	Stadium: Anoeta; Attendance: 0 Referee: Eduardo Prieto Iglesias
Note: The match was originally scheduled for 12 April, but was postponed due to the 2020 coronavirus pandemic, and rescheduled to 24 June. It was played behind closed doors.

27 June 2020 32	Celta Vigo	2–2	Barcelona	Vigo
17:00 CEST (UTC+2)	Méndez (yellow card) 34'; Smolov 50'; Araujo (yellow card) 61'; Aspas 88', (yellow card) 89'	Report	Alba (yellow card) 12'; Suárez 20', 67'; Umtiti (yellow card) 53'; Braithwaite (yellow card) 82'; Piqué (yellow card) 90+5'	Stadium: Balaídos; Attendance: 0 Referee: Guillermo Cuadra Fernández
Note: The match was originally scheduled for 22 April, but was postponed due to the 2020 coronavirus pandemic, and rescheduled to 27 June. It was played behind closed doors.

30 June 2020 33	Mallorca	5–1	Celta Vigo	Palma
19:30 CEST (UTC+2)	Budimir 13' (pen.), 52', (yellow card) 54'; Hernández 27'; Pozo 40'; Valjent (yellow card) 48'; Sevilla 60'; Gámez (yellow card) 89'	Report	Aspas 50' (pen.); Fernández (yellow card) 75'; Murillo (yellow card) 80'	Stadium: Estadi de Son Moix; Attendance: 0 Referee: Ricardo de Burgos Bengoetxea
Note: The match was originally scheduled for 26 April, but was postponed due to the 2020 coronavirus pandemic, and rescheduled to 30 June. It was played behind closed doors.

4 July 2020 34	Celta Vigo	1–1	Real Betis	Vigo
17:00 CEST (UTC+2)	Nolito 22'; Kevin (yellow card) 62'; Aspas (yellow card) 64'; Araujo (yellow card) 78'; Yokuşlu (yellow card) 82'; Bradarić (yellow card) 86'	Report	Moreno (yellow card) 21'; Mandi (yellow card) 55'; Tello (yellow card) 72'; Canales (yellow card) 75'; Feddal 79'	Stadium: Balaídos; Attendance: 0 Referee: Pablo González Fuertes
Note: The match was originally scheduled for 3 May, but was postponed due to the 2020 coronavirus pandemic, and rescheduled to 4 July. It was played behind closed doors.

7 July 2020 35	Celta Vigo	1–1	Atlético Madrid	Vigo
22:00 CEST (UTC+2)	Méndez (yellow card) 22'; Nolito (yellow card) 41'; Jorge (yellow card) 47'; Beltrán 49'; Murillo (yellow card) 51'	Report	Morata 1'; Lodi (yellow card) 23'; Giménez (yellow card) 79'; Herrera (yellow card) 90+4'	Stadium: Balaídos; Attendance: 0 Referee: José María Sánchez Martínez
Note: The match was originally scheduled for 10 May, but was postponed due to the 2020 coronavirus pandemic, and rescheduled to 7 July. It was played behind closed doors.

11 July 2020 36	Osasuna	2–1	Celta Vigo	Pamplona
17:00 CEST (UTC+2)	Aridane (yellow card) 3'; Gallego 23'; D. García (yellow card) 48'; Arnaiz 90+1'	Report	Mina 10'; Jorge (yellow card) 19'; Rafinha (yellow card) 59'	Stadium: El Sadar; Attendance: 0 Referee: Valentín Pizarro Gómez
Note: The match was originally scheduled for 13 May, but was postponed due to the 2020 coronavirus pandemic, and rescheduled to 11 July. It was played behind closed doors.

16 July 2020 37	Celta Vigo	2–3	Levante	Vigo
21:00 CEST (UTC+2)	Mina 36'; Rafinha (yellow card) 42'; Aspas 45+1'; Nolito (yellow card) 84' (yellow-red card) 90+4'	Report	Bardhi 11', 28'; Mayoral 52'; Miramón (red card) 59'	Stadium: Balaídos; Attendance: 0 Referee: José Luis Munuera Montero
Note: The match was originally scheduled for 17 May, but was postponed due to the 2020 coronavirus pandemic, and rescheduled to 16 July. It was played behind closed doors.

19 July 2020 38	Espanyol	0–0	Celta Vigo	Cornellà de Llobregat
21:00 CEST (UTC+2)	Vilà (yellow card) 89'; Embarba (yellow card) 90+2'	Report	Bradarić (yellow card) 26'; Olaza (yellow card) 65'; Jacobo (yellow card) 90'	Stadium: RCDE Stadium; Attendance: 0 Referee: Adrián Cordero Vega
Note: The match was originally scheduled for 24 May, but was postponed due to the 2020 coronavirus pandemic, and rescheduled to 19 July. It was played behind closed doors.

=== Copa del Rey ===
19 December 2019 First round	Peña Azagresa	0–2	Celta Vigo	Calahorra (Note: Peña Azagresa played its game at La Planilla instead of their regular stadium Miguel Sola, in Azagra, as it does not meet the requirements established by the Royal Spanish Football Federation.)
19:00 CET (UTC+1)	Castillo (yellow card) 56'; Imas (yellow card) 80'	Report	Jorge (yellow card) 19'; Fernández (yellow card) 39'; Hernández 45+1', 69'; Beltrán (yellow card) 71'	Stadium: La Planilla; Attendance: 4,000; Referee: César Soto Grado

12 January 2020 Second round	Mérida	1–4	Celta Vigo	Mérida
16:00 CET (UTC+1)	Poley 39' (pen.); Espinar (yellow card) 71'	Report	Mina 22', 59', (yellow card) 45+1'; Sisto 30'; Méndez 48' (pen.)	Stadium: Estadio Romano; Attendance: 7,500; Referee: Javier Alberola Rojas

23 January 2020 Round of 32	Mirandés	2–1 (a.e.t.)	Celta Vigo	Miranda de Ebro
19:00 CET (UTC+1)	Matheus 28' (pen.); Kijera (yellow card) 37'; Vicente (yellow card) 45+1'; Merquelanz (yellow card) 70'; Sánchez 114', (yellow card) 117'	Report	Méndez (yellow card) 28'; Jorge (yellow card) 56'; Sisto 74'; Fontán (yellow card) 100'; Rafinha (red card) 111'; Aspas (yellow card) 111'	Stadium: Anduva; Attendance: 2,407; Referee: Juan Martínez Munuera

== Statistics ==
=== Appearances and goals ===
Last updated on the end of the season.

No.	Pos	Nat	Player	Total		La Liga		Copa del Rey	
No.	Pos	Nat	Player	Apps	Goals	Apps	Goals	Apps	Goals
Goalkeepers
1	GK	(Spain) ESP	Sergio	4	0	2	0	2	0
13	GK	(Spain) ESP	Rubén Blanco	34	0	33	0	1	0
25	GK	(Spain) ESP	Iván Villar	4	0	3+1	0	0	0
Defenders
2	DF	(Spain) ESP	Hugo Mallo	29	0	22+5	0	2	0
4	DF	(Mexico) MEX	Néstor Araujo	36	1	32+2	1	2	0
15	DF	(Uruguay) URU	Lucas Olaza	37	1	35	1	1+1	0
16	DF	(Spain) ESP	Jorge Sáenz	9	0	5+2	0	2	0
17	DF	(Spain) ESP	David Juncà	3	0	3	0	0	0
18	DF	(Ghana) GHA	Joseph Aidoo	33	0	27+5	0	1	0
20	DF	(Spain) ESP	Kevin Vázquez	20	0	16+1	0	2+1	0
21	DF	(Colombia) COL	Jeison Murillo	18	1	17+1	1	0	0
31	DF	(Spain) ESP	José Fontán	1	0	0	0	1	0
32	DF	(Spain) ESP	Sergio Carreira	1	0	0	0	0+1	0
Midfielders
5	MF	(Turkey) TUR	Okay Yokuşlu	25	0	24+1	0	0	0
6	MF	(Spain) ESP	Denis Suárez	28	1	20+6	1	1+1	0
8	MF	(Spain) ESP	Fran Beltrán	30	1	22+6	1	2	0
11	MF	(Denmark) DEN	Pione Sisto	23	4	8+13	2	1+1	2
12	MF	(Brazil) BRA	Rafinha	30	4	25+4	4	0+1	0
14	MF	(Croatia) CRO	Filip Bradarić	14	0	7+7	0	0	0
23	MF	(Spain) ESP	Brais Méndez	34	1	15+16	0	2+1	1
24	MF	(Spain) ESP	Pape Cheikh	18	0	6+9	0	3	0
28	MF	(Spain) ESP	Sergio Bermejo	2	0	0+1	0	1	0
29	MF	(Spain) ESP	Jacobo González	1	0	1	0	0	0
Forwards
3	FW	(Spain) ESP	Nolito	7	2	1+6	2	0	0
7	FW	(Spain) ESP	Juan Hernández	8	2	1+4	0	3	2
9	FW	(Russia) RUS	Fyodor Smolov	14	2	10+4	2	0	0
10	FW	(Spain) ESP	Iago Aspas	38	14	37	14	0+1	0
19	FW	(Uruguay) URU	Gabriel Fernández	21	1	5+14	1	2	0
22	FW	(Spain) ESP	Santi Mina	36	8	21+13	6	2	2
36	FW	(Spain) ESP	Iker Losada	4	1	0+2	1	0+2	0
Players who have made an appearance or had a squad number this season but have left the club
3	DF	(Spain) ESP	David Costas	8	0	3+3	0	2	0
9	FW	(Guadeloupe) GLP	Claudio Beauvue	0	0	0	0	0	0
14	MF	(Slovakia) SVK	Stanislav Lobotka	17	0	17	0	0	0

=== Goalscorers ===
As of matches played until 30 June 2020

Rank	No.	Pos.	Player	La Liga	Copa del Rey	Total
1	10	FW	(Spain) Iago Aspas	13	0	13
2	22	FW	(Spain) Santi Mina	4	2	6
3	11	MF	(Denmark) Pione Sisto	2	2	4
3	12	MF	(Brazil) Rafinha	4	0	4
5	7	FW	(Spain) Juan Hernández	0	2	2
5	9	FW	(Russia) Fyodor Smolov	2	0	2
7	4	DF	(Mexico) Néstor Araujo	1	0	1
7	19	FW	(Uruguay) Gabriel Fernández	1	0	1
7	36	FW	(Spain) Iker Losada	1	0	1
7	23	MF	(Spain) Brais Méndez	1	0	1
7	21	DF	(Colombia) Jeison Murillo	1	0	1
7	3	FW	(Spain) Nolito	1	0	1
7	15	DF	(Uruguay) Lucas Olaza	1	0	1
7	6	MF	(Spain) Denis Suárez	0	1	1
TOTAL				32	7	39

=== Clean sheets ===
As of 22 February 2020

Rank	Name	La Liga	Copa del Rey	Total
1	(Spain) Rubén Blanco	5	1	6
2	(Spain) Sergio Álvarez	1	0	1
Total		6	1	7
