= Diego García (footballer, born 2000) =

Spanish footballer

Personal information
- Full name: Diego García Campos
- Date of birth: 18 April 2000 (age 26)
- Place of birth: Madrid, Spain
- Height: 1.85 m (6 ft 1 in)
- Position: Forward

Team information
- Current team: Malmö FF
- Number: 9

Youth career
- Real Madrid
- 2014–2016: Alcobendas
- 2016–2018: Rayo Vallecano

Senior career*
Years	Team	Apps	(Gls)
2018–2020	Rayo Vallecano B	18	(2)
2020–2022	Leganés B	53	(21)
2022–2026	Leganés	114	(19)
2022–2023	→ Fuenlabrada (loan)	36	(13)
2026–	Malmö FF	9	(4)
- * Club domestic league appearances and goals as of 31 August 2026

Diego García Campos (born 18 April 2000) is a Spanish professional footballer who plays as a forward for Allsvenskan club Malmö FF.

== Career ==
=== Early career ===
Born in Madrid, García represented Real Madrid, Alcobendas and Rayo Vallecano as a youth. He made his senior debut with the latter's reserves on 6 December 2018, coming on as a second-half substitute in a 2–0 Tercera División home win against Alcalá.

García scored his first senior goal on 22 September 2019, netting the opener in a 2–1 home success over Torrejón. He did not establish himself as a regular starter during the campaign, starting in just seven matches and scoring one further goal.

=== Leganés ===
On 6 October 2020, García signed for Leganés, being initially assigned to the B-team also in the fourth division. The following 16 May, after scoring 13 goals with the B's, he made his first team debut by replacing Sabin Merino late into a 3–0 home win against Logroñés in the Segunda División championship.

On 3 August 2022, García was loaned to Primera Federación side Fuenlabrada for the season. After being the club's top scorer with 13 goals, he returned to Lega in June 2023 and renewed his contract until 2025.

García scored his first professional goal on 27 August 2023, netting Leganés' second through a penalty kick in a 2–0 home win over Albacete. He finished the campaign with 12 goals, being the club's top scorer as they achieved promotion to La Liga.

García made his debut in the top tier of Spanish football on 17 August 2024, replacing Miguel de la Fuente late into a 1–1 away draw against Osasuna. His first goal in the category came on 27 October, as he scored the opener in a 3–0 home win over Celta.

=== Malmö FF ===
On 26 June 2026, García moved abroad for the first time in his career, signing a three-and-a-half-year contract with Allsvenskan side Malmö FF. He made his debut for Malmö FF in the home match against IFK Göteborg on 12 July.

== Career statistics ==
As of match played 31 August 2026

Appearances and goals by club, season and competition
Club	Season	League			Cup		Continental		Other		Total	
Club	Season	Division	Apps	Goals	Apps	Goals	Apps	Goals	Apps	Goals	Apps	Goals
Rayo Vallecano B	2018–19	Tercera División	2	0	—		—		—		2	0
Rayo Vallecano B	2019–20	Tercera División	16	2	—		—		—		16	2
Rayo Vallecano B	Total		18	2	—		—		—		18	2
Leganés B	2020–21	Tercera División	25	13	—		—		—		25	13
Leganés B	2021–22	Segunda División RFEF	28	8	—		—		—		28	8
Leganés B	Total		53	21	—		—		—		53	21
Leganés	2022–23	Segunda División	2	0	0	0	—		1	0	3	0
Leganés	2021–22	Segunda División	4	0	1	0	—		—		5	0
Leganés	2023–24	Segunda División	42	12	2	0	—		—		44	12
Leganés	2024–25	La Liga	28	3	4	1	—		—		32	4
Leganés	2025–26	Segunda División	38	4	0	0	—		—		38	4
Leganés	Total		114	19	7	1	—		1	0	122	20
Fuenlabrada (loan)	2022–23	Primera Federación	36	13	1	0	—		—		37	13
Malmö FF	2026	Allsvenskan	9	4	0	0	—		—		9	4
Career total			230	59	4	0	0	0	1	0	235	59

== Honours ==
Leganés

- Segunda División: 2023–24

Leganés B

- Tercera División: 2020–21
