= Sydney Osazuwa =

Spanish footballer

Personal information
- Full name: Sydney Ehizogie Osazuwa Omoruyi
- Date of birth: 21 April 2007 (age 19)
- Place of birth: Fuenlabrada, Spain
- Height: 1.93 m (6 ft 4 in)
- Position: Forward

Team information
- Current team: Real Sociedad B
- Number: 20

Youth career
- 2013–2017: Nuevo Versalles
- 2017–2020: Atlético Madrid
- 2020–2021: Móstoles
- 2021–2022: Getafe
- 2022–2023: Granada
- 2023–2024: Leganés

Senior career*
Years	Team	Apps	(Gls)
2024	Leganés B	9	(1)
2024	Leganés	2	(0)
2024–	Real Sociedad B	16	(3)
2026	→ Jong AZ (loan)	4	(1)

International career^{‡}
2024	Spain U17	9	(5)
2024	Spain U18	3	(2)
- * Club domestic league appearances and goals as of 28 April 2026 ‡ National team caps and goals as of 03:29, 16 October 2024 (UTC)

Sydney Ehizogie Osazuwa Omoruyi (born 21 April 2007) is a Spanish footballer who plays as a forward for Real Sociedad B.

== Club career ==
Born in Fuenlabrada, Community of Madrid to Nigerian parents, Osazuwa joined Atlético Madrid's youth setup in 2017, from AD Nuevo Versalles Loranca. After leaving Atleti in 2020, he subsequently represented CD Móstoles URJC, Getafe CF and Granada CF before joining the Juvenil squad of CD Leganés in 2023.

On 27 January 2024, before even having appeared for the reserves, Osazuwa made his professional debut by coming on as a late substitute for Aritz Arambarri in a 1–0 Segunda División away loss to Real Oviedo; aged 16 years, 9 months and 6 days, he became the second youngest player to debut for the club in a professional tier, only behind Samuel Eto'o.

On 10 July 2024, Osazuwa signed for Real Sociedad and was assigned to the B-team in Primera Federación. On 2 February 2026, he was loaned to Eredivisie club AZ Alkmaar until June. He was assigned to their reserve team Jong AZ in the second-tier Eerste Divisie.

== International career ==
On 30 January 2024, Osazuwa was called up to the Spain under-17 team.
