= Germán Sáenz =

Spanish footballer

Germán
Personal information
- Full name: Germán Sáenz de Miera Colmeiro
- Date of birth: 25 July 1990 (age 36)
- Place of birth: Santa Cruz de Tenerife, Spain
- Height: 1.86 m (6 ft 1 in)
- Position: Midfielder

Youth career
- 2008–2009: Tenerife

Senior career*
Years	Team	Apps	(Gls)
2009–2011	Tenerife B	47	(16)
2011–2013	Tenerife	14	(0)
2012	→ Dénia (loan)	10	(0)
2013	→ Guijuelo (loan)	16	(2)
2013–2015	Las Palmas B	64	(13)
2015–2017	Murcia	47	(12)
2017	Cartagena	15	(1)
2017–2018	Logroñés	7	(0)
2018	Mérida	17	(4)
2018–2019	Ibiza	8	(0)
2019	Jumilla	12	(1)
2019–2020	Atzeneta	23	(3)
2020–2022	Alzira	33	(6)
2023–2024	Pego	10	(5)
- * Club domestic league appearances and goals as of 15:36, 22 February 2024 (UTC)

Germán Sáenz de Miera Colmeiro (born 25 July 1990), known simply as Germán, is a Spanish footballer who plays as a midfielder.

== Club career ==
Born in Santa Cruz de Tenerife, Canary Islands, Germán was a product of CD Tenerife youth system. He made his senior debut with the B team in the Segunda División B, appearing in 17 matches as a substitute in a relegation-ending season.

Germán played the first of his seven competitive matches with the main squad on 1 May 2011, featuring the last five minutes in the 2–1 away defeat against Granada CF. Again, he was relegated at the end of the campaign, now from Segunda División.

On 25 January 2012, Germán was loaned to third-tier club CD Dénia – managed by former Tenerife player Nino Lema – for the rest of the season. Roughly one year later, he made a similar move to CD Guijuelo, as the former suffered administrative relegation.

In the 2013 off-season, Germán signed for UD Las Palmas Atlético in his native region. After a career-best 11 goals in a relegation-ending season, he remained in the third division with a one-year deal that he signed at Real Murcia CF on 30 June 2015.

== Personal life ==
Germán's younger brother, Jorge, was also a footballer. He too was developed at Tenerife.
