= Seydouba Cissé =

Guinean footballer (born 2001)

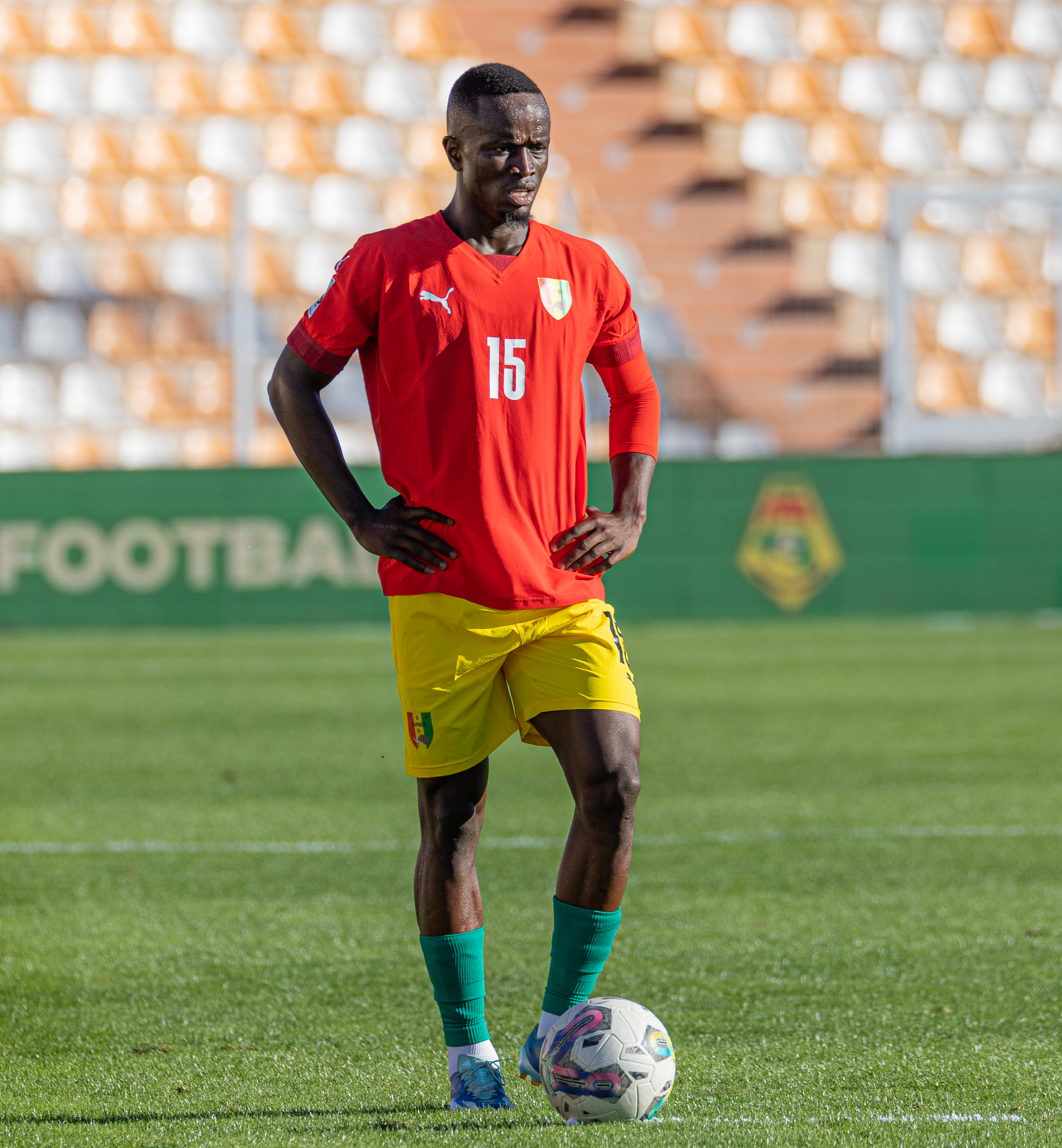
- Cissé with Guinea in 2023

Personal information
- Date of birth: 10 February 2001 (age 25)
- Place of birth: Dabola, Guinea
- Height: 1.78 m (5 ft 10 in)
- Position: Midfielder

Team information
- Current team: Al-Kholood
- Number: 8

Youth career
- FC Attouga

Senior career*
Years	Team	Apps	(Gls)
2020	Leganés C	6	(0)
2020–2022	Leganés B	23	(1)
2021–2026	Leganés	148	(14)
2026–	Al-Kholood	7	(0)

International career^{‡}
2017	Guinea U17	7	(0)
2022–	Guinea	29	(3)
- * Club domestic league appearances and goals as of 30 September 2026 ‡ National team caps and goals as of 26 September 2026

Seydouba Cissé (born 10 February 2001) is a Guinean professional footballer who plays as a midfielder for Saudi club Al-Kholood and the Guinea national team.

== Club career ==
=== Leganés ===
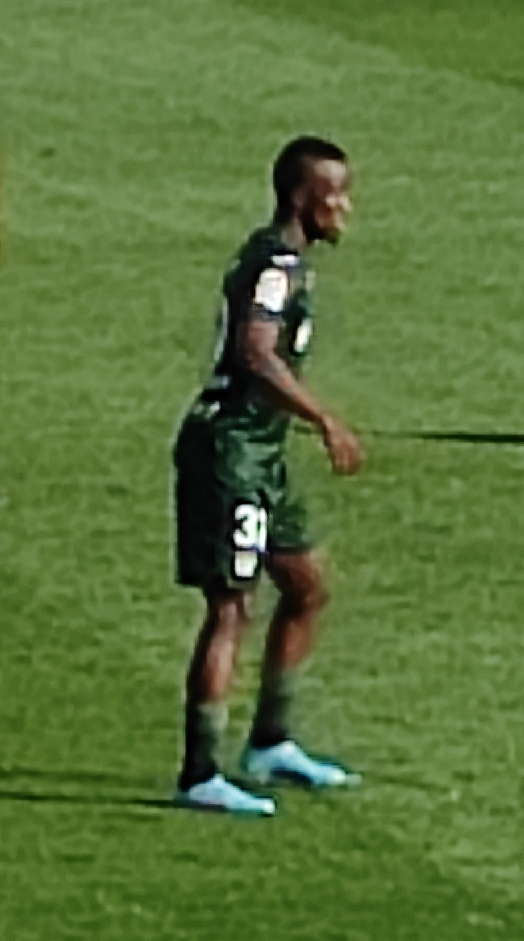
Cissé with Leganés in 2022

Born in Dabola, Cissé began his career at local side FC Attouga, and had failed trials at Anderlecht, Odense Boldklub and Vejle BK. On 16 January 2020, he joined Leganés, being initially assigned to the C-team in the regional leagues.

Ahead of the 2020–21 season, Cissé was promoted to the reserves in Tercera División. He made his first team debut on 10 September 2021, coming on as a late substitute for fellow youth graduate Naim García in a 2–1 Segunda División away loss against Sporting de Gijón.

Cissé scored his first professional goal on 11 February 2022, netting the opener in a 2–1 home win over Real Zaragoza. Thirteen days later, he renewed his contract until 2026.

=== Al-Kholood ===
In March 2026, Cissé agreed to a pre-contract with Saudi Pro League side Al-Kholood, effective as of 1 July.

== International career ==
Cissé was called up to the Guinea national team for a set of 2023 Africa Cup of Nations qualification matches in June 2022. He made his debut with Guinea on 5 June 2022 he did it in a 1–0 defeat against Egypt.

== Career statistics ==
=== Club ===
As of match played 13 September 2026

Appearances and goals by club, season and competition
Club	Season	League			Cup		Continental		Other		Total	
Club	Season	Division	Apps	Goals	Apps	Goals	Apps	Goals	Apps	Goals	Apps	Goals
Leganés	2021–22	Segunda División	20	3	2	0	—		—		22	3
Leganés	2022–23	Segunda División	33	4	1	0	—		—		34	4
Leganés	2023–24	Segunda División	26	1	2	0	—		—		28	1
Leganés	2024–25	La Liga	34	3	3	0	—		—		37	3
Leganés	2025–26	Segunda División	35	3	0	0	—		—		35	3
Leganés	Total		148	14	8	0	0	0	0	0	156	14
Al-Kholood	2026–27	Saudi Pro League	7	0	1	0	—		—		8	0
Career total			155	14	9	0	0	0	0	0	164	14

=== International ===
As of match played 26 September 2026

Appearances and goals by national team and year
National team	Year	Apps	Goals
Guinea	2022	3	0
Guinea	2023	8	1
Guinea	2024	8	1
Guinea	2025	6	0
Guinea	2026	4	1
Total		29	3

Scores and results list Guinea's goal tally first, score column indicates score after each Cissé goal.

List of international goals scored by Seydouba Cissé
No.	Date	Venue	Opponent	Score	Result	Competition
1	17 November 2023	Berkane Municipal Stadium, Berkane, Morocco	Uganda	2–1	2–1	2026 FIFA World Cup qualification
2	12 October 2024	Alassane Ouattara Stadium, Abidjan, Ivory Coast	Ethiopia	4–0	4–1	2025 Africa Cup of Nations qualification
3	26 September 2026	Orlando Stadium, Johannesburg, South Africa	South Africa	1–1	1–2	2027 Africa Cup of Nations qualification

== Honours ==
Leganés

- Segunda División: 2023–24
