= Aritz Arambarri =

Spanish footballer

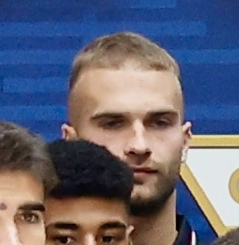

Personal information
- Full name: Aritz Arambarri Murua
- Date of birth: 31 January 1998 (age 28)
- Place of birth: Azkoitia, Spain
- Height: 1.86 m (6 ft 1 in)
- Position: Centre-back

Team information
- Current team: Mirandés

Youth career
- 2011–2017: Real Sociedad

Senior career*
Years	Team	Apps	(Gls)
2017–2019	Real Sociedad C	35	(2)
2017–2023	Real Sociedad B	116	(4)
2020–2023	Real Sociedad	1	(0)
2023–2024	Leganés	28	(0)
2024–2026	Eibar	50	(0)
2026–	Mirandés	0	(0)
- * Club domestic league appearances and goals as of 6 June 2026

Aritz Arambarri Murua (born 31 January 1998) is a Spanish professional footballer who plays as a central defender for CD Mirandés.

== Career ==
Born in Azkoitia, Gipuzkoa, Basque Country, Arambarri represented Real Sociedad as youth, joining the club's youth setup in 2011. He made his senior debut with the C-team during the 2016–17 season, in Tercera División.

Arambarri was definitely promoted to the reserves in Segunda División B midway through the 2018–19 campaign, and scored his first senior goal with the side on 9 December 2018 in a 4–2 home win against CD Vitoria. On 1 July 2020, he renewed his contract until 2023.

Arambarri made his first team – and La Liga – debut on 1 November 2020, coming on as a second-half substitute for fellow youth graduate Andoni Gorosabel in a 4–1 home routing of Celta de Vigo. He subsequently returned to the B-team, helping in their promotion to Segunda División at the end of the season.

On 22 June 2023, Arambarri signed a two-year contract with CD Leganés in the second level. He helped the club to achieve promotion to the top tier as champions, but was mainly a backup to starters Sergio González and Jorge Sáenz.

On 29 August 2024, Arambarri signed a three-year contract with SD Eibar in the second division. On 30 July 2026, he terminated his link with the club and signed for Primera Federación side CD Mirandés.

== Honours ==
Leganés

- Segunda División: 2023–24
