= Jorge Sáenz =

Spanish footballer

Jorge
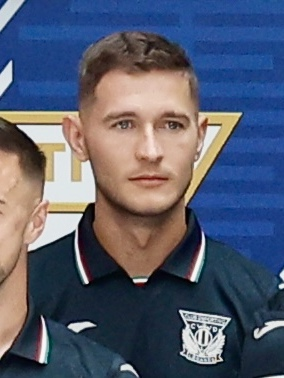
- Jorge with Leganés in 2024

Personal information
- Full name: Jorge Sáenz de Miera Colmeiro
- Date of birth: 17 November 1996 (age 29)
- Place of birth: Santa Cruz de Tenerife, Spain
- Height: 1.92 m (6 ft 4 in)
- Position: Centre-back

Team information
- Current team: Sporting Gijón
- Number: 23

Youth career
- Tenerife

Senior career*
Years	Team	Apps	(Gls)
2013–2015	Tenerife B	36	(3)
2015–2019	Tenerife	104	(5)
2019–2023	Valencia	0	(0)
2019–2021	→ Celta (loan)	7	(0)
2021–2022	→ Marítimo (loan)	6	(0)
2022	→ Mirandés (loan)	15	(0)
2022–2023	→ Leganés (loan)	37	(0)
2023–2026	Leganés	72	(3)
2026–	Sporting Gijón	4	(0)

International career
2015	Spain U19	2	(0)
2017–2019	Spain U21	4	(0)
- * Club domestic league appearances and goals as of 00:05, 30 October 2026 (UTC)

Jorge Sáenz de Miera Colmeiro (born 17 November 1996), known simply as Jorge [ˈxoɾxe], is a Spanish professional footballer who plays as a central defender for Segunda División club Sporting de Gijón.

== Club career ==
=== Tenerife ===
Born in Santa Cruz de Tenerife, Canary Islands, Jorge started playing in CD Tenerife's youth setup. He made his senior debut with the reserves in the 2012–13 season, in the Tercera División.

Jorge played his first match as a professional on 4 January 2015, starting in a 1–1 Segunda División home draw against Sporting de Gijón. On 20 August, he was definitely promoted to the first team.

On 31 January 2016, Jorge was sent off for two bookings in the first half of a 2–1 loss at Gimnàstic de Tarragona. He scored his first league goal on 21 January 2018, but in a 1–3 home defeat to FC Barcelona B.

=== Valencia ===
Jorge signed a five-year contract with La Liga club Valencia CF on 25 February 2019 for a transfer fee of €3 million, effective as of 1 July. On 15 July, he joined RC Celta de Vigo in the same league on a two-year loan, with an option to make the deal permanent for €7 million as Maxi Gómez moved in the opposite direction. He made his debut in the competition two months later, receiving a straight card in the tenth minute on an eventual 2–0 home loss against Granada CF.

On 28 July 2021, Jorge was loaned to C.S. Marítimo of the Portuguese Primeira Liga for one year. The following 29 January, however, he moved to CD Mirandés back in his home country also in a temporary deal.

=== Leganés ===
On 5 July 2022, Jorge joined CD Leganés also in the second division, on a one-year loan with a buyout clause. In July 2023, he agreed to a permanent two-year contract.

Jorge scored his only goal in the top tier on 22 September 2024, opening a 1–1 draw away to Getafe CF; after putting his team ahead in the 76th minute, he brought down Diego Rico shortly after, and Borja Mayoral converted the penalty to equalise. The campaign ended in relegation.

=== Sporting Gijón ===
On 16 June 2026, the free agent Jorge moved to Sporting Gijón on a two-year contract.

== Personal life ==
Jorge's older brother, Germán, was also a footballer. He too was developed at Tenerife.

== Career statistics ==
As of match played 24 May 2025

Appearances and goals by club, season and competition
Club	Season	League			National cup		Other		Total	
Club	Season	Division	Apps	Goals	Apps	Goals	Apps	Goals	Apps	Goals
Tenerife	2014–15	Segunda División	5	0	0	0	—		5	0
Tenerife	2015–16	Segunda División	16	0	1	0	—		17	0
Tenerife	2016–17	Segunda División	29	0	1	0	4 (Note: Appearances in La Liga play-offs)	1	34	1
Tenerife	2017–18	Segunda División	21	1	3	0	—		24	1
Tenerife	2018–19	Segunda División	33	4	1	0	—		34	4
Tenerife	Total		104	5	6	0	4	1	114	6
Celta (loan)	2019–20	La Liga	7	0	2	0	—		9	0
Celta (loan)	2020–21	La Liga	0	0	0	0	—		0	0
Celta (loan)	Total		7	0	2	0	0	0	9	0
Marítimo (loan)	2021–22	Primeira Liga	6	0	1	0	—		7	0
Mirandés (loan)	2021–22	Segunda División	15	0	—		—		15	0
Leganés (loan)	2022–23	Segunda División	37	0	1	0	—		38	0
Leganés	2023–24	Segunda División	36	2	1	0	—		37	2
Leganés	2024–25	La Liga	23	1	2	0	—		25	1
Leganés	Total		59	3	3	0	—		62	3
Career total			228	8	13	0	4	1	245	9

== Honours ==
Leganés

- Segunda División: 2023–24
