= Dani Raba =

Spanish footballer

Personal information
- Full name: Daniel Raba Antolín
- Date of birth: 29 October 1995 (age 31)
- Place of birth: Santander, Spain
- Height: 1.84 m (6 ft 0 in)
- Position: Winger

Team information
- Current team: Valencia
- Number: 19

Youth career
- Calasanz
- Bansander

Senior career*
Years	Team	Apps	(Gls)
2014–2016	Villarreal C	54	(9)
2016–2018	Villarreal B	35	(4)
2017–2022	Villarreal	41	(2)
2019–2020	→ Huesca (loan)	23	(4)
2022	Granada	2	(0)
2022–2025	Leganés	94	(20)
2025–	Valencia	13	(0)
- * Club domestic league appearances and goals as of 20:57, 21 June 2026 (UTC)

Daniel Raba Antolín (born 29 October 1995) is a Spanish professional footballer who plays as a right winger for La Liga club Valencia.

== Career ==
=== Villarreal ===
Born in Santander, Cantabria, Raba joined Villarreal CF in July 2014 at the age of 19, from Club Bansander. He was assigned to the C team, and made his senior debut on 30 August of that year by coming on as a substitute for Mario González and scoring in a 1–3 home loss against CD Castellón in the Tercera División.

On 3 January 2016, Raba first appeared with the reserves by replacing Alfonso Pedraza in a 2–2 Segunda División B home draw with RCD Espanyol B. Definitely promoted to the B side ahead of the 2016–17 campaign, he scored his first goal for them on 28 August in a 1–1 draw against CF Gavà in the same venue, and renewed his contract on 4 June 2017.

Raba made his first-team debut on 25 October 2017, replacing fellow youth graduate Leo Suárez in a 1–0 loss at SD Ponferradina in the round of 32 of the Copa del Rey. His first match in La Liga took place on 5 November, when he came in for Carlos Bacca late into the 2–0 home win over Málaga CF.

On 23 November 2017, Raba scored his first professional goal, his team's first in a 3–2 victory against FC Astana in the group stage of the UEFA Europa League. His first in the league arrived ten days later, but in a 3–1 away defeat to CD Leganés.

On 5 August 2019, Raba joined recently relegated club SD Huesca on a season-long loan deal. He returned to Villarreal in July 2020, but featured rarely until terminating his contract on 31 January 2022; his sole UEFA Champions League appearance took place on 23 November 2021, as a late replacement in the 0–2 home loss to Manchester United in the group phase.

=== Granada ===
On 2 February 2022, Raba signed a short-term contract with Granada CF. He totalled only 24 minutes during his spell, also being relegated from the top flight.

=== Leganés ===
On 24 June 2022, Raba agreed to a two-year deal at CD Leganés in the Segunda División. He scored eight goals during the 2023–24 season, achieving promotion as champions.

In June 2024, Raba extended his contract for a further year. In the 2024–25 campaign, he again netted eight times (nine in all competitions), but was unable to avoid relegation.

=== Valencia ===
On 5 June 2025, Valencia CF announced the signing of Raba on a two-year contract, effective on 1 July.

== Personal life ==
Raba's younger brother, Pablo, is also a footballer. A defender, he was developed at Racing de Santander.

== Career statistics ==
As of match played 2 June 2024

Appearances and goals by club, season and competition
Club	Season	League			Cup		Continental		Other		Total	
Club	Season	Division	Apps	Goals	Apps	Goals	Apps	Goals	Apps	Goals	Apps	Goals
Villarreal B	2015–16	Segunda División B	1	0	–		–		–		1	0
Villarreal B	2016–17	Segunda División B	20	1	–		–		–		20	1
Villarreal B	2017–18	Segunda División B	14	3	–		–		4 (Note: Appearances in Segunda División B promotion play-offs)	2	18	5
Villarreal B	Total		35	4	0	0	0	0	4	2	39	6
Villarreal	2017–18	La Liga	21	2	4	1	4 (Note: Appearances in UEFA Europa League)	1	–		29	4
Villarreal	2018–19	La Liga	8	0	4	1	5	1	–		17	2
Villarreal	2020–21	La Liga	5	0	4	1	2	0	–		11	1
Villarreal	2021–22	La Liga	7	0	3	1	1 (Note: Appearance in UEFA Champions League)	0	1 (Note: Appearance in UEFA Super Cup)	0	12	1
Villarreal	Total		41	2	15	4	12	2	1	0	69	8
Huesca (loan)	2019–20	Segunda División	23	4	1	1	–		–		24	5
Granada	2021–22	La Liga	2	0	–		–		–		2	0
Leganés	2022–23	Segunda División	31	4	1	0	–		–		32	4
Leganés	2023–24	Segunda División	34	8	0	0	–		–		34	8
Leganés	Total		65	12	1	0	0	0	0	0	66	12
Career total			166	22	17	5	12	2	5	2	200	31

== Honours ==
Huesca

- Segunda División: 2019–20

Villarreal

- UEFA Europa League: 2020–21

Leganés

- Segunda División: 2023–24
