= Yvan Neyou =

Cameroonian footballer (born 1997)

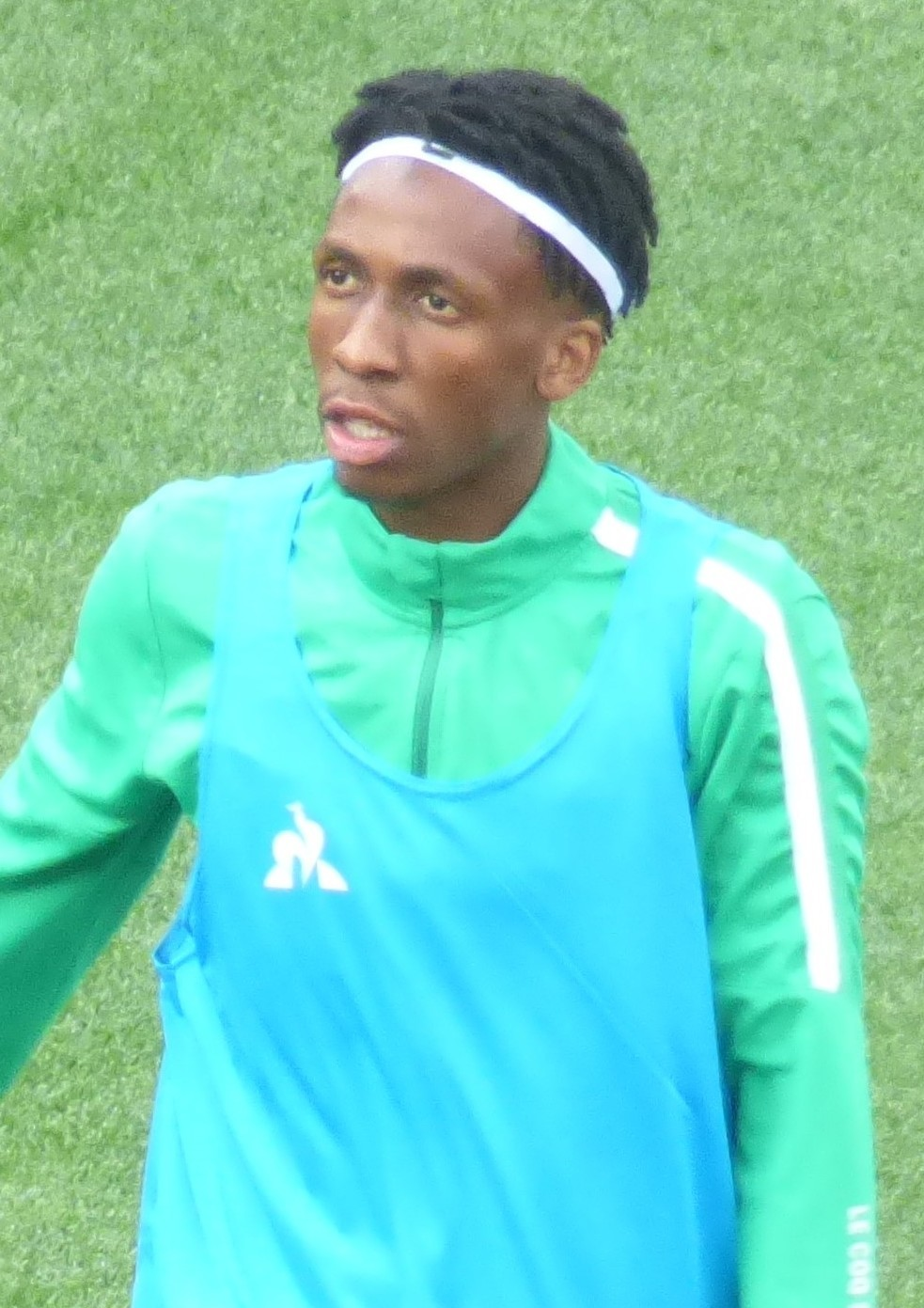
- Neyou with Saint-Étienne in 2020

Personal information
- Full name: Yvan Latour Neyou Noupa
- Date of birth: 3 January 1997 (age 29)
- Place of birth: Douala, Cameroon
- Height: 1.80 m (5 ft 11 in)
- Position: Midfielder

Team information
- Current team: Volos (on loan from Getafe)
- Number: 91

Youth career
- 2010–2011: INF Clairefontaine
- 2011–2012: Linas-Montlhéry
- 2012–2015: Auxerre
- 2015–2016: Sedan

Senior career*
Years	Team	Apps	(Gls)
2016–2017	Sedan	17	(0)
2017–2019	Laval	22	(1)
2017–2019	Laval B	13	(4)
2019–2020	Braga B	22	(2)
2020	→ Saint-Étienne (loan)	9	(0)
2020–2023	Saint-Étienne	40	(1)
2022	Saint-Étienne B	2	(0)
2022–2023	→ Leganés (loan)	21	(0)
2023–2025	Leganés	65	(2)
2025–	Getafe	5	(0)
2026	→ Al-Okhdood (loan)	7	(0)
2026–	→ Volos (loan)	1	(0)

International career^{‡}
2021–	Cameroon	11	(0)
Medal record
Men's football
Representing Cameroon
Africa Cup of Nations
Third place	2021 Cameroon
- * Club domestic league appearances and goals as of 20 September 2026 ‡ National team caps and goals as of 15:54, 19 November 2024 (UTC)

Yvan Latour Neyou Noupa (born 3 January 1997) is a Cameroonian professional footballer who plays as a midfielder for Super League Greece club Volos, on loan from Getafe, and the Cameroon national team.

== Club career ==
=== Sedan and Laval ===
Neyou started his career with Sedan in the Championnat National, where good performances had him linked with Belgian side Standard Liège and French champions Paris Saint-Germain. However, he ultimately joined Ligue 2 side Laval in early 2017. He made his debut against Red Star on 10 February 2017, coming on as a substitute for Romain Bayard.

=== Braga B ===
Neyou also enjoyed a stint with Braga B, during which the team was relegated from the LigaPro to the Campeonato de Portugal.

=== Saint-Étienne ===
On 10 July 2020, Neyou joined Ligue 1 club Saint-Étienne on a one-year loan with an option to buy. He made his first appearance with the club as a substitute in the 2020 Coupe de France final against Paris Saint-Germain, which ended in a 1–0 victory for the Parisian club.

After putting up some good performances, Neyou earned himself a permanent deal with Saint-Étienne on 18 November 2020. He signed a contract lasting until 2024.

=== Leganés ===
On 31 August 2022, Neyou moved to Segunda División side Leganés on a one-year loan deal. On 1 August 2023, he signed a permanent two-year contract with the club.

=== Getafe ===
Neyou joined La Liga club Getafe as a free agent on 1 July 2025, having signed a three-year contract.

==== Al-Okhdood (loan) ====
On 31 January 2026, Neyou moved to Saudi Pro League side Al-Okhdood on a six-month loan deal.

==== Volos (loan) ====
On 2 September 2026, Neyou moved to Super League Greece club Volos on a year loan deal.

== International career ==
Neyou holds Cameroonian and French nationalities.

He debuted with the senior Cameroon national team in a 1–0 friendly win over Nigeria on 4 June 2021.

== Career statistics ==
=== Club ===
As of match played 1 July 2025

Appearances and goals by club, season and competition
Club	Season	League			Cup		Other		Total	
Club	Season	Division	Apps	Goals	Apps	Goals	Apps	Goals	Apps	Goals
Sedan	2015–16	National	2	0	0	0	—		2	0
Sedan	2016–17	National	15	0	1	0	—		16	0
Sedan	Total		17	0	1	0	—		18	0
Laval	2016–17	Ligue 2	5	0	0	0	0	0	5	0
Laval	2017–18	National	17	1	0	0	1 (Note: Appearance in the Coupe de la Ligue)	0	18	1
Laval	Total		22	1	0	0	1	0	23	1
Laval B	2016–17	CFA 2	5	2	—		—		5	2
Laval B	2017–18	National 3	8	2	—		—		8	2
Laval B	Total		13	4	—		—		13	4
Braga B	2018–19	LigaPro	8	2	—		—		8	2
Braga B	2019–20	Campeonato de Portugal	14	0	—		—		14	0
Braga B	Total		22	2	—		—		22	2
Saint-Étienne (loan)	2019–20	Ligue 1	0	0	1	0	—		1	0
Saint-Étienne (loan)	2020–21	Ligue 1	9	0	0	0	—		9	0
Saint-Étienne	2020–21	Ligue 1	22	1	0	0	—		22	1
Saint-Étienne	2021–22	Ligue 1	16	0	0	0	0	0	16	0
Saint-Étienne	2022–23	Ligue 2	2	0	0	0	—		2	0
Saint-Étienne	Total		40	1	0	0	0	0	38	1
Saint-Étienne B	2021–22	National 3	1	0	—		—		1	0
Saint-Étienne B	2022–23	National 3	1	0	—		—		1	0
Saint-Étienne B	Total		2	0	—		—		2	0
Leganés (loan)	2022–23	Segunda División	1	0	0	0	0	0	1	0
Leganés	2023–24	Segunda División	35	1	1	0	—		36	1
Leganés	2024–25	La Liga	30	1	3	0	—		33	1
Leganés	Total		65	2	4	0	—		69	2
Career total			191	10	6	0	1	0	198	10

=== International ===
As of match played 19 November 2024

Appearances and goals by national team and year
National team	Year	Apps	Goals
Cameroon	2021	3	0
Cameroon	2022	2	0
Cameroon	2023	1	0
Cameroon	2024	5	0
Total		11	0

== Honours ==
Saint-Étienne

- Coupe de France runner-up: 2019–20

Leganés

- Segunda División: 2023–24

Cameroon

- Africa Cup of Nations third place: 2021
