= Miguel de la Fuente =

Spanish footballer

Personal information
- Full name: Miguel de la Fuente Escudero
- Date of birth: 3 September 1999 (age 27)
- Place of birth: Tudela de Duero, Spain
- Height: 1.82 m (6 ft 0 in)
- Position: Forward

Team information
- Current team: Almería
- Number: 24

Youth career
- 2013–2017: Valladolid

Senior career*
Years	Team	Apps	(Gls)
2017–2020	Valladolid B	84	(24)
2018–2021	Valladolid	9	(0)
2020–2021	→ Leganés (loan)	24	(5)
2021–2024	Alavés	58	(5)
2023–2024	→ Leganés (loan)	35	(13)
2024–2026	Leganés	50	(3)
2026	→ Almería (loan)	21	(5)
2026–	Almería	0	(0)

International career
2017	Spain U18	2	(0)
2017–2018	Spain U19	4	(2)
- * Club domestic league appearances and goals as of 3 June 2026

Miguel de la Fuente Escudero (Spanish pronunciation: [miˈɣel de la ˈfwente]; born 3 September 1999), sometimes known as Miguelín ([miɣeˈlin]) or simply Miguel, is a Spanish professional footballer who plays as a forward for Almería.

== Club career ==
Born in Tudela de Duero, Valladolid, Castile and León, Miguel joined Real Valladolid's youth setup in 2013, aged 13. On 26 March 2017, aged just 17, he made his senior debut with the reserves by starting in a 0–0 away draw against Burgos in the Segunda División B.

On 20 November 2017, Miguel renewed his contract until 2021. Six days later he scored his first senior goal, netting the equalizer for the B-team in a 1–1 draw at Pontevedra.

On 21 October 2018, Miguel made his first-team – and La Liga – debut, coming on as a late substitute for Enes Ünal in a 1–0 away defeat of Real Betis. On 1 October 2020, he was loaned to Segunda División side Leganés for one year.

Miguel scored his first professional goal on 11 April 2021, netting the equalizer in a 1–2 away loss against Espanyol. On 16 May, he scored a brace in a 3–0 home success over Logroñés.

On 23 August 2021, free agent Miguel signed a four-year contract with Alavés of the top tier. He scored his first goal in the category on 11 May of the following year, netting the opener in a 2–1 home win over Espanyol.

On 1 September 2023, Miguel returned to Leganés on a one-year loan deal. On 31 January 2025, he missed two penalties in injury time as Leganés suffered a 1–0 defeat at home to Rayo Vallecano.

On 14 January 2026, after being mainly a substitute option, Miguel was loaned to fellow second division side Almería until June, with a buyout clause. On 26 June, the clause was activated and the player signed a permanent three-year deal with the Andalusians.

== Career statistics ==
=== Club ===
As of match played 9 March 2026

Appearances and goals by club, season and competition
Club	Season	League			National cup		Other		Total	
Club	Season	Division	Apps	Goals	Apps	Goals	Apps	Goals	Apps	Goals
Valladolid B	2016–17	Segunda División B	8	0	—		—		8	0
Valladolid B	2017–18	Segunda División B	25	2	—		—		25	2
Valladolid B	2018–19	Segunda División B	25	8	—		—		25	8
Valladolid B	2019–20	Segunda División B	26	14	—		1 (Note: Appearance(s) in Promotion Playoffs)	1	27	15
Valladolid B	Total		84	24	0	0	1	1	85	25
Valladolid	2018–19	La Liga	2	0	1	0	—		3	0
Valladolid	2019–20	La Liga	7	0	2	0	—		9	0
Valladolid	Total		9	0	3	0	0	0	12	0
Leganés (loan)	2020–21	Segunda División	24	5	3	1	2	0	29	6
Alavés	2021–22	La Liga	22	1	2	0	—		24	1
Alavés	2022–23	Segunda División	33	4	1	0	1	0	35	4
Alavés	2023–24	La Liga	3	0	—		—		3	0
Alavés	Total		58	5	3	0	1	0	62	5
Leganés (loan)	2023–24	Segunda División	35	13	0	0	—		35	13
Leganés	2024–25	La Liga	34	1	4	1	—		38	2
Leganés	2025–26	Segunda División	16	2	2	1	—		18	3
Leganés	Total		85	16	6	2	1	0	91	18
Almería (loan)	2025–26	Segunda División	8	2	0	0	—		8	2
Career total			268	52	15	3	4	1	287	56

== Honours ==
Leganés

- Segunda División: 2023–24

Individual

- Segunda División Player of the Month: November 2023
