= Iker Undabarrena =

Spanish footballer (born 1995)

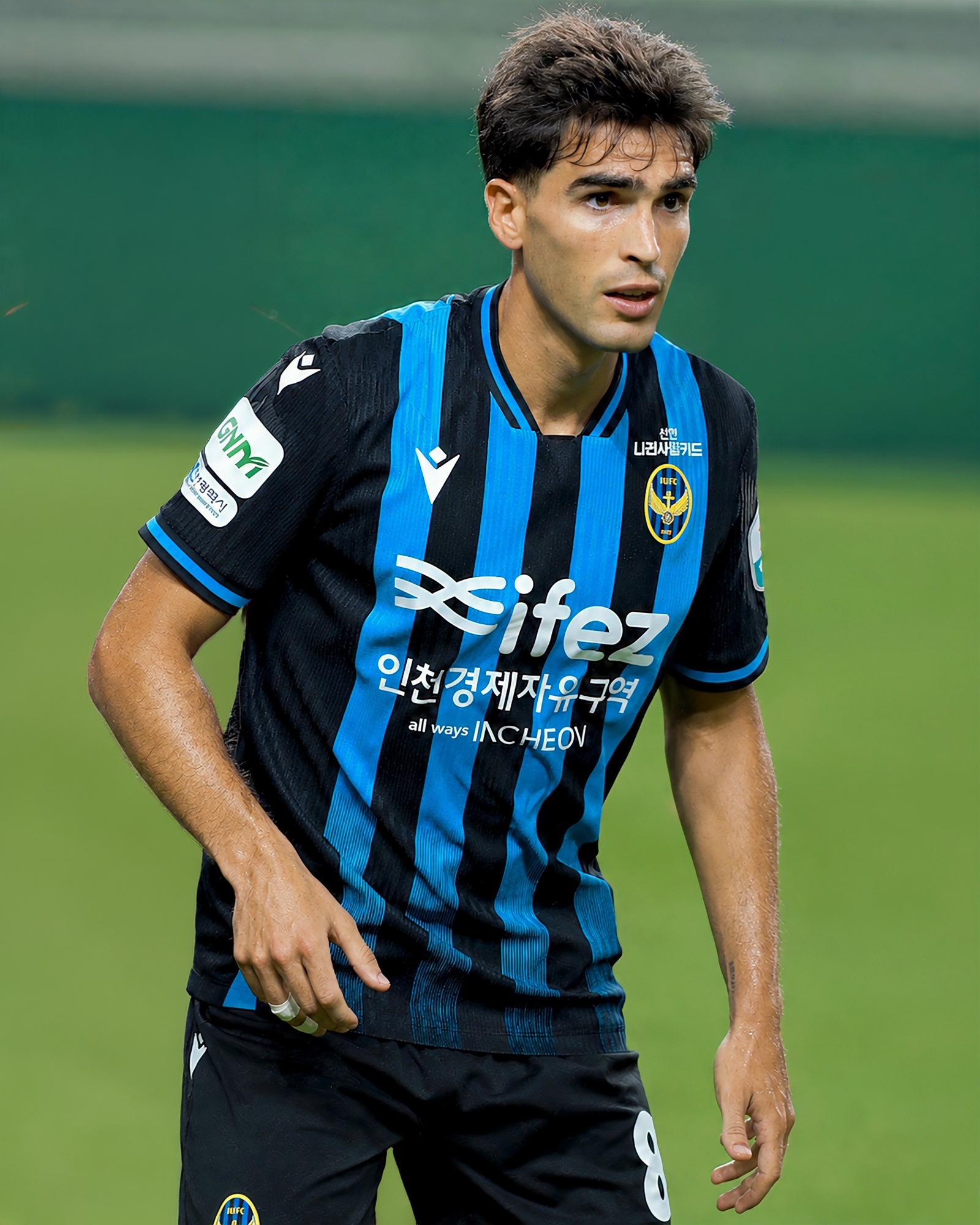
- Undabarrena with Incheon United, 2026

Personal information
- Full name: Iker Undabarrena Martínez
- Date of birth: 18 May 1995 (age 31)
- Place of birth: Gorliz, Spain
- Height: 1.81 m (5 ft 11 in)
- Position: Defensive midfielder

Team information
- Current team: Incheon United
- Number: 8

Youth career
- 2005–2012: Athletic Bilbao

Senior career*
Years	Team	Apps	(Gls)
2012–2014	Basconia	30	(1)
2012–2018	Athletic Bilbao	0	(0)
2013–2018	Bilbao Athletic	105	(3)
2018–2020	Tenerife	46	(0)
2020–2021	Sabadell	20	(0)
2021–2022	Tondela	30	(2)
2022–2024	Leganés	65	(1)
2024–2025	Johor Darul Ta'zim	7	(0)
2026–	Incheon United	9	(0)

International career^{‡}
2011	Spain U16	6	(0)
2011	Spain U17	18	(0)
- * Club domestic league appearances and goals as of 3 August 2026 ‡ National team caps and goals as of 19 October 2011

Iker Undabarrena Martínez (born 18 May 1995) is a Spanish professional footballer who plays as a defensive midfielder for K League 1 club, Incheon United. His previous clubs include Bilbao Athletic, Tenerife, Sabadell and Leganés in Spain, Tondela in Portugal and Johor Darul Ta'zim in Malaysia.

== Club career ==
=== Athletic Bilbao ===
Born in Gorliz, Biscay, Undabarrena joined Athletic Bilbao's youth system in 2005, aged 10. He made his senior debut with farm team Basconia of the Tercera División, in the 2012–13 season. On 28 November 2012, aged 17, Undabarrena made his official debut with the main squad, coming on as a substitute for Igor Martínez in the 77th minute of a 2–0 away win against Hapoel Ironi Kiryat Shmona in the campaign's UEFA Europa League.

Having moved up to play for the reserves in summer 2013, Undabarrena played a prominent role in the team's promotion to the second tier the following season, starting 28 regular league matches and all six of the successful play-offs run.

Almost three years after his European bow, Undabarrena made his domestic professional debut on 24 August 2015, starting in a 0–1 home loss against Girona. He appeared in almost all of the domestic league matches until 13 February 2016, when he suffered a rupture of the anterior cruciate ligament in his left knee during a fixture against Real Valladolid, requiring a lengthy rehabilitation. Returning to the team eight months later at the end of October, he went on to take part in the majority of the remaining matches during 2016–17 before being withdrawn from the final few games as a precaution to complete his recovery.

Undabarrena started the first four fixtures of the next campaign, but then suffered another ACL tear during training, this time to his right knee. In the same period, similar injuries were endured by Aitor Seguín, Undabarrena's long-time teammate (he also joined Athletic's academy as a 10-year-old in 2005) which hampered the development of both players and damaged their hopes of moving up to the senior squad; during Undabarrena's lengthy absences, midfielder Mikel Vesga was promoted instead.

Despite making a successful return to the B-team with ten appearances and one goal between March and May (including two in the promotion play-offs), Undabarrena was released by Athletic Bilbao on the expiry of his contract on 1 July 2018, ending a 13-year association with the club.

=== Tenerife ===
On 3 July 2018, free agent Undaberrena agreed a deal to join second-tier Tenerife (at the time coached by former Athletic Bilbao player Joseba Etxeberria) on a three-year contract.

=== Sabadell ===
On 31 August 2020, Undaberrena moved to fellow league team Sabadell.

=== Tondela ===
Undabarrena moved abroad for the first time on 6 August 2021, signing a two-year deal at Portuguese club Tondela under fellow Basque Pako Ayestarán. He made his Primeira Liga debut two days later in a 3–0 opening day win over C.D. Santa Clara, as a late substitute. On 23 October, he was sent off within half an hour of a 3–1 lost to visitors Porto, for a foul on Mehdi Taremi.

=== Leganés ===
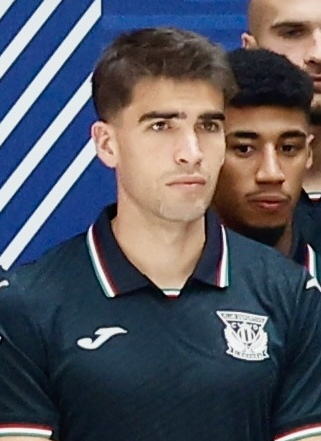
Undabarrena at the Leganés trophy ceremony, 2024

On 26 August 2022, after suffering relegation, Undabarrena returned to Spain after signing a one-year deal with Leganés in division two. Having played regularly, he signed another contract for the 2023–24 Segunda División campaign which ended with the club being promoted to LaLiga as champions, but he was one of several squad members whose deals were not renewed.

=== Johor Darul Ta'zim ===
On 11 August 2024, Undabarrena moved to Southeast Asia to joined Malaysian Super League giants Johor Darul Ta'zim.

=== Incheon United ===
On 7 January 2026, Undabarrena moved to South Korea and joined K League 1 promoted club, Incheon United for 2026 season.

== International career ==
Undabarrena started representing Spain at under-17 level, appearing in friendlies against Belgium and Montenegro.

== Personal life ==
He is not related to Eneko Undabarrena, also a midfielder who played for several clubs in the region during the same period.

== Career statistics ==
As of 3 August 2026.

Appearances and goals by club, season and competition
Club	Season	League			National cup		League cup		Continental		Other		Total	
Club	Season	Division	Apps	Goals	Apps	Goals	Apps	Goals	Apps	Goals	Apps	Goals	Apps	Goals
Athletic Bilbao	2012–13	La Liga	0	0	0	0	–		1 (Note: Appearance in 2012–13 UEFA Europa League)	0	–		1	0
Basconia	2012–13	Tercera División	27	1	–		–		–		–		27	1
Basconia	2013–14	Tercera División	1	0	–		–		–		–		1	0
Basconia	Total		28	1	0	0	0	0	0	0	0	0	28	1
Bilbao Athletic	2013–14	Segunda División B	21	0	–		–		–		–		21	0
Bilbao Athletic	2014–15	Segunda División B	28	0	–		–		–		6 (Note: Appearances in 2015 Segunda División B play-offs)	0	34	0
Bilbao Athletic	2015–16	Segunda División	23	0	–		–		–		–		23	0
Bilbao Athletic	2016–17	Segunda División B	21	2	–		–		–		–		21	2
Bilbao Athletic	2017–18	Segunda División B	12	1	–		–		–		2 (Note: Appearances in 2018 Segunda División B play-offs)	0	14	1
Bilbao Athletic	Total		105	3	0	0	0	0	0	0	8	0	113	3
Tenerife	2018–19	Segunda División	27	0	1	0	–		–		–		28	0
Tenerife	2019–20	Segunda División	19	0	3	0	–		–		–		22	0
Tenerife	Total		46	0	4	0	0	0	0	0	0	0	50	0
Sabadell	2020–21	Segunda División	36	0	2	0	–		–		–		38	2
Tondela	2021–22	Primeira Liga	28	2	4	0	0	0	–		–		32	2
Tondela	2022–23	Liga Portugal 2	2	0	0	0	0	0	–		1 (Note: Appearance in 2022 Supertaça Cândido de Oliveira)	0	3	0
Tondela	Total		30	2	4	0	0	0	0	0	1	0	35	2
Leganés	2022–23	Segunda División	33	0	1	0	–		–		–		34	0
Leganés	2023–24	Segunda División	32	1	1	0	–		–		–		33	1
Leganés	Total		65	1	2	0	0	0	0	0	0	0	67	1
Johor Darul Ta'zim	2024–25	Malaysia Super League	10	0	0	0	0	0	6 (Note: Appearances in 2024–25 AFC Champions League Elite)	0	–		16	0
Johor Darul Ta'zim	2025–26	Malaysia Super League	1	0	0	0	0	0	0	0	–		1	0
Incheon United	2026	K League 1	9	0	0	0	0	0	0	0	–		9	0
Career total			330	7	12	0	0	0	7	0	9	0	358	7

== Honours ==
=== Club ===
Tondela

- Taça de Portugal: runner-up 2021–22

Leganés

- Segunda División: 2023–24

Johor Darul Ta'zim

- Malaysia Super League: 2024–25
- Malaysia Cup: 2024–25
- Malaysia Charity Shield: 2025
