= Lalo Aguilar =

Spanish footballer (born 2002)

Personal information
- Full name: Gonzalo Aguilar López
- Date of birth: 11 June 2002 (age 24)
- Place of birth: Madrid, Spain
- Height: 1.88 m (6 ft 2 in)
- Position: Centre back

Team information
- Current team: Leganés
- Number: 6

Youth career
- Atlético Madrid
- 2013–2021: Leganés

Senior career*
Years	Team	Apps	(Gls)
2019–2020	Leganés C	2	(0)
2021–2023	Leganés B	30	(0)
2022–	Leganés	38	(0)
2024	→ Atlético Madrid B (loan)	12	(0)
2024–2025	→ Albacete (loan)	33	(0)
- * Club domestic league appearances and goals as of 9 June 2026

Gonzalo "Lalo" Aguilar López (born 11 June 2002) is a Spanish footballer who plays as a central defender for CD Leganés.

== Club career ==
Born in Madrid, Lalo joined CD Leganés' youth setup in 2013, from Atlético Madrid. He made his senior debut with the C-team on 17 November 2019, starting in a 3–0 Primera Categoría de Aficionados away loss against CD Los Yébenes San Bruno B.

Lalo was promoted to the reserves ahead of the 2021–22 season, in Segunda División RFEF. On 23 July 2022, he renewed his contract until 2024.

Lalo made his first team debut on 12 November 2022, starting in a 0–0 draw (6–5 penalty loss) at Gernika Club, for the campaign's Copa del Rey. His professional debut occurred the following 27 March, as he came on as a second-half substitute for Josema in a 2–0 away loss against Málaga CF in the Segunda División.

On 1 February 2024, Lalo was loaned to Primera Federación side Atlético Madrid B until the end of the season. On 20 August, he moved to Albacete Balompié in the second division also in a temporary deal.
