= 2020–21 CD Leganés season =

CD Leganés
2020–21 season
- President: María Victoria Pavón
- Head coach: José Luis Martí
- Stadium: Estadio Municipal de Butarque
- Segunda División: 3rd
- Play-offs: Semi-finals
- Copa del Rey: Round of 32
- Top goalscorer: League: Sabin Merino (9); All: Sabin Merino (9)
Home colours	Away colours	Third colours

The 2020–21 CD Leganés season was the club's 92nd season in existence and the first season back in the second division of Spanish football. In addition to the domestic league, Leganés participated in this season's edition of the Copa del Rey. The season covered the period from 20 July 2020 to 30 June 2021.

== Players ==
=== First-team squad ===
Note: Flags indicate national team as defined under FIFA eligibility rules; some limited exceptions apply. Players may hold more than one non-FIFA nationality.

No.	Pos.	Nation	Player
1	GK	ESP	Iván Cuéllar
2	DF	ESP	Sergi Palencia (on loan from Saint-Étienne)
3	DF	ESP	Unai Bustinza (Captain)
4	DF	NGR	Kenneth Omeruo
5	DF	ARG	Jonathan Silva
6	DF	ESP	Sergio González
7	FW	ESP	Brandon (on loan from Osasuna)
8	MF	JPN	Gaku Shibasaki
9	FW	ESP	Sabin Merino
10	FW	ESP	José Arnaiz
11	FW	ESP	Juan Muñoz
12	DF	ESP	Dani Lasure (on loan from Zaragoza)
13	GK	ESP	Asier Riesgo
14	FW	ESP	Javier Avilés

No.	Pos.	Nation	Player
15	DF	ESP	Rodrigo Tarín
16	DF	VEN	Roberto Rosales
17	MF	ESP	Javier Eraso
18	MF	ESP	Robert Ibáñez (on loan from Osasuna)
19	MF	ESP	Luis Perea
20	DF	ESP	Ignasi Miquel (on loan from Getafe)
21	MF	ESP	Rubén Pérez (Vice-captain)
22	MF	SUI	Kevin Bua
24	FW	ESP	Borja Bastón
25	MF	ESP	Rubén Pardo (on loan from Bordeaux)
28	DF	ESP	Javi Hernández
29	FW	ESP	Miguel de la Fuente (on loan from Valladolid)
30	GK	ESP	Diego Conde (on loan from Atlético Madrid)

=== Reserve team ===
Note: Flags indicate national team as defined under FIFA eligibility rules; some limited exceptions apply. Players may hold more than one non-FIFA nationality.

No.	Pos.	Nation	Player
33	DF	ESP	Javi Rubio
35	GK	ESP	Pablo Lombo

No.	Pos.	Nation	Player
36	MF	BRA	Cássio Júnior

=== Out on loan ===
Note: Flags indicate national team as defined under FIFA eligibility rules; some limited exceptions apply. Players may hold more than one non-FIFA nationality.

No.	Pos.	Nation	Player
—	DF	VEN	Josua Mejías (at Málaga until 30 June 2021)
—	DF	UKR	Vasyl Kravets (at Lech Poznań until 30 June 2021)
—	MF	ESP	Recio (at Eibar until 30 June 2021)
—	MF	MAR	Aymane Mourid (at Chabab Mohammédia until 30 June 2021)
—	MF	ARG	Facundo García (at Valencia Mestalla until 30 June 2021)

No.	Pos.	Nation	Player
—	MF	ESP	Raúl Sánchez (at Rayo Majadahonda until 30 June 2021)
—	FW	URU	Agus Alonso (at Melilla until 30 June 2021)
—	FW	ESP	Manu Garrido (at Hércules until 30 June 2021)
—	FW	BRA	William (at Valencia Mestalla until 30 June 2021)

== Pre-season and friendlies ==
Win Draw Loss

26 August 2020 Friendly	Cartagena	0–1	Leganés	San Pedro del Pinatar, Spain
10:00 CEST (UTC+2)			Merino 73' (pen.)	Stadium: Pinatar Arena; Referee: David Gálvez Rascón

29 August 2020 Friendly	Leganés	3–1	Eibar	Leganés, Spain
10:00 CEST (UTC+2)	Omeruo 3'; Rosales 12'; Arnaiz 40'	Report	Quique 90+1' (pen.)	Stadium: Instalación Deportiva Butarque; Attendance: 0 Referee: Sergio Pérez Muley

2 September 2020 Friendly	Leganés	0–1	Rayo Vallecano	Leganés, Spain
19:00 CEST (UTC+2)		Report	Montiel 90+2'	Stadium: Estadio Municipal de Butarque; Attendance: 0 Referee: Pedro Muñoz Piedra

5 September 2020 Friendly	Albacete	0–0	Leganés	Albacete, Spain
19:30 CEST (UTC+2)				Stadium: Ciudad Deportiva Andrés Iniesta; Attendance: 0

== Competitions ==
=== Overview ===
Competition	First match	Last match	Starting round	Final position	Record							
Competition	First match	Last match	Starting round	Final position	Pld	W	D	L	GF	GA	GD	Win %
Segunda División	12 September 2020	30 May 2021	Matchday 1	3rd	42	21	10	11	51	31	+20	50.00
Segunda División promotion play-offs	3 June 2021	6 June 2021	Semi-finals	Semi-finals	2	0	0	2	1	5	−4	0.00
Copa del Rey	16 December 2020	16 January 2021	First round	Round of 32	3	2	0	1	3	1	+2	66.67
Total					47	23	10	14	55	37	+18	48.94

Source: Soccerway

=== Segunda División ===
==== League table ====
Pos	Team	Pld	W	D	L	GF	GA	GD	Pts	Promotion, qualification or relegation
1	Espanyol (C, P)	42	24	10	8	71	28	+43	82 (Note: Head-to-head points: Espanyol: 4, Mallorca: 1)	Promotion to La Liga
2	Mallorca (P)	42	24	10	8	54	28	+26	82	Promotion to La Liga
3	Leganés	42	21	10	11	51	32	+19	73 (Note: Head-to-head points: Leganés: 4, Almería: 1)	Qualification for promotion play-offs
4	Almería	42	21	10	11	61	40	+21	73	Qualification for promotion play-offs
5	Girona	42	20	11	11	47	36	+11	71	Qualification for promotion play-offs

Source: LaLiga
Rules for classification: 1) points; 2) head-to-head points; 3) head-to-head goal difference; 4) goal difference; 5) number of goals scored
(C) Champions; (P) Promoted

==== Results summary ====
Overall								Home						Away					
Pld	W	D	L	GF	GA	GD	Pts	W	D	L	GF	GA	GD	W	D	L	GF	GA	GD
42	21	10	11	51	31	+20	73	15	3	3	28	11	+17	6	7	8	23	20	+3

Source: La Liga

==== Results by round ====
Round	1	2	3	4	5	6	7	8	9	10	11	12	13	14	15	16	17	18	19	20	21	22	23	24	25	26	27	28	29	30	31	32	33	34	35	36	37	38	39	40	41	42
Ground	H	A	H	A	H	A	H	H	A	H	A	H	A	H	A	H	A	H	A	A	H	A	H	A	H	H	A	H	A	H	A	A	H	A	H	A	H	A	H	A	H	A
Result	W	L	W	L	L	W	W	W	L	W	D	W	W	W	L	W	D	L	D	D	W	L	W	W	W	W	L	D	W	L	D	L	W	L	D	W	D	D	W	D	W	W
Position	7	9	5	8	13	10	9	4	5	4	4	4	4	4	4	4	4	4	4	4	4	4	4	4	4	4	4	4	4	4	4	5	4	4	4	4	4	4	4	3	3	3

Source: La Liga
A = Away; H = Home; W = Win; D = Draw; L = Loss

==== Matches ====
The league fixtures were announced on 31 August 2020.

12 September 2020 1	Leganés	1–0	Las Palmas	Leganés
18:15 CEST (UTC+2)	Muñoz 75'	Report		Stadium: Estadio Municipal de Butarque; Attendance: 0 (Note: The match was played behind closed doors due to the COVID-19 pandemic in Spain.); Referee: José Antonio López Toca

20 September 2020 2	Lugo	2–1	Leganés	Lugo
12:00 CEST (UTC+2)	Rodríguez 64'; Barreiro 87' (pen.)	Report	Merino 23'	Stadium: Anxo Carro; Attendance: 0 Referee: Daniel Ocón Arráiz

27 September 2020 3	Leganés	3–1	Cartagena	Leganés
20:30 CEST (UTC+2)	Rosales 24'; Merino 30', 40', (yellow card) 90+2'; Perea (yellow card) 35'; Pérez (yellow card) 69'; Bastón (yellow card) 90+2'	Report	Uriel (yellow card) 45+1'; Castro 50'; Zorrilla (yellow card) 90+5'	Stadium: Estadio Municipal de Butarque; Attendance: 0 Referee: Saúl Ais Reig

4 October 2020 4	Castellón	2–0	Leganés	Castellón de la Plana
18:15 CEST (UTC+2)	Miquel 31' (o.g.); Sánchez (yellow card) 37'; Muguruza (yellow card) 67'; Zlatanović 90+2'	Report	Bastón (yellow card) 90+1'	Stadium: Nou Estadi Castàlia; Attendance: 0 Referee: Iñaki Bikandi Garrido

11 October 2020 5	Leganés	0–1	Girona	Leganés
16:00 CEST (UTC+2)	Pérez (yellow card) 14'; Merino (yellow card) 20'; Avilés (yellow card) 45+1'; Pardo (yellow card) 55'; Palencia (yellow card) 67'	Report	Cristóforo (yellow card) 11'; Sylla 38'; Aday (yellow card) 44'; Sáiz (yellow card) 85'; Juan Carlos (yellow card) 86'; Monchu (yellow card) 87'	Stadium: Estadio Municipal de Butarque; Attendance: 0 Referee: Juan Luis Pulido Santana

17 October 2020 6	UD Logroñés	0–1	Leganés	Logroño
20:30 CEST (UTC+2)	Zelu (yellow card) 40'	Report	Bastón 31' (pen.), (yellow card) 37'; Hernández (yellow card) 35'; Merino (yellow card) 90+2'	Stadium: Las Gaunas; Attendance: 0 Referee: Ignacio Iglesias Villanueva

22 October 2020 7	Leganés	1–0	Zaragoza	Leganés
16:30 CEST (UTC+2)	Omeruo (yellow card) 52'; Arnaiz 57'; Eraso (yellow card) 87'; Cuéllar (yellow card) 90+4'	Report	Guitián (yellow card) 90+2'	Stadium: Estadio Municipal de Butarque; Attendance: 0 Referee: Luis Mario Milla Alvéndiz

25 October 2020 8	Leganés	2–1	Oviedo	Leganés
18:15 CET (UTC+1)	Shibasaki 61'; Bastón 87'	Report	Johannesson (yellow card) 6'; Fernández (yellow card) 38'; Obeng 90+3'	Stadium: Estadio Municipal de Butarque; Attendance: 0 Referee: Dámaso Arcediano Monescillo

29 October 2020 9	Sabadell	1–0	Leganés	Sabadell
21:30 CET (UTC+1)	Ibiza (yellow card) 27'; Ozkoidi (yellow card) 33'; Stoichkov 52'; Gergo (yellow card) 87'	Report	Hernández (yellow card) 23'; Tarín (yellow card) 38'; Santos (yellow card) 79'; Omeruo (yellow card) 82'; Pérez (yellow card) 90+9'	Stadium: Nova Creu Alta; Attendance: 0 Referee: Daniel Jesús Trujillo Suárez

1 November 2020 10	Leganés	1–0	Mirandés	Leganés
14:00 CET (UTC+1)	Palencia (yellow card) 45'; Arnaiz 49'; Santos (yellow card) 90+1'	Report	Berrocal (yellow card) 11'; Jiménez (yellow card) 54'	Stadium: Estadio Municipal de Butarque; Attendance: 0 Referee: Jon Ander González Esteban

6 November 2020 11	Albacete	0–0	Leganés	Albacete
21:00 CET (UTC+1)	Israfilov (yellow card) 24'; Zozulya (yellow card) 26'; Benito (yellow card) 73'; Peña (yellow card) 77'; Diamanka (yellow card) 84'	Report	Pérez (yellow card) 90+1'	Stadium: Carlos Belmonte; Attendance: 0 Referee: Eduardo Prieto Iglesias

15 November 2020 12	Leganés	1–0	Alcorcón	Leganés
14:00 CET (UTC+1)	Pérez (yellow card) 49'; Arnaiz (yellow card) 58'; Merino 60'; Miquel (yellow card) 65'	Report	Laure (yellow card) 32' (yellow-red card) 87'; Óscar (yellow card) 36'	Stadium: Estadio Municipal de Butarque; Attendance: 0 Referee: Gorka Sagues Oscoz

21 November 2020 13	Málaga	1–2	Leganés	Málaga
14:00 CET (UTC+1)	Muñoz (yellow card) 26'; Juande 63', (yellow card) 70'	Report	Perea (yellow card) 20'; Juande 33' (o.g.); Bustinza (yellow card) 44'; Merino 71' (pen.); Tarín (yellow card) 86'	Stadium: La Rosaleda; Attendance: 0 Referee: Oliver De La Fuente

26 November 2020 14	Leganés	2–0	Espanyol	Leganés
19:00 CET (UTC+1)	Bastón 41'; Arnaiz 47'; Pérez (yellow card) 52'	Report	Miguelón (yellow card) 28' (yellow-red card) 44'; Darder (yellow card) 90+2'	Stadium: Estadio Municipal de Butarque; Attendance: 0 Referee: Alejandro Muñíz Ruiz

29 November 2020 15	Ponferradina	3–2	Leganés	Ponferrada
18:15 CET (UTC+1)	Sánchez 22'; Sielva 35'; Yuri 54' (pen.)	Report	Muñoz 16'; Sielva 39' (o.g.); Tarín (yellow card) 52'; Rosales (yellow card) 90'	Stadium: El Toralín; Attendance: 0 Referee: José Antonio López Toca

2 December 2020 16	Leganés	1–0	Rayo Vallecano	Leganés
19:00 CET (UTC+1)	Arnaiz 4'; Ibáñez (yellow card) 30'; Pérez (red card) 81'	Report	Pascual (yellow card) 51'; Dimitrievski (yellow card) 63', (red card) 63'; Á. García (yellow card) 84'	Stadium: Estadio Municipal de Butarque; Attendance: 0 Referee: Eduardo Prieto Iglesias

7 December 2020 17	Tenerife	0–0	Leganés	Santa Cruz de Tenerife
19:00 CET (UTC+1)	Padilla (yellow card) 8'; Alonso (yellow card) 10'; Pomares (yellow card) 22'; Jiménez (yellow card) 90+3'	Report	Arnaiz (yellow card) 67'; Perea (yellow card) 89'	Stadium: Estadio Heliodoro Rodríguez López; Attendance: 0 Referee: Luis Mario Milla Alvéndiz

12 December 2020 18	Leganés	0–1	Mallorca	Leganés
16:00 CET (UTC+1)	Ibáñez (yellow card) 28' (yellow-red card) 39'	Report	Sánchez (yellow card) 19'; Amath 61'	Stadium: Estadio Municipal de Butarque; Attendance: 0 Referee: Gorka Sagues Oscoz

21 December 2020 19	Sporting Gijón	1–1	Leganés	Gijón
21:00 CET (UTC+1)	Đurđević (yellow card) 43' (goal) 86'; Valiente (yellow card) 90+4'	Report	Omeruo (yellow card) 81'; Cuéllar (yellow card) 85'; Bastón 90+6' (pen.)	Stadium: El Molinón; Attendance: 0 Referee: Juan Luis Pulido Santana

2 January 2021 20	Fuenlabrada	0–0	Leganés	Fuenlabrada
14:00 CET (UTC+1)	Cristian (yellow card) 8'; Ciss (yellow card) 89'	Report	Palencia (yellow card) 23'; Miquel (yellow card) 27'; Omeruo (yellow card) 45+1'; Cuéllar (yellow card) 56'	Stadium: Fernando Torres; Attendance: 0 Referee: Alejandro Muñíz Ruiz

24 January 2021 22	Las Palmas	2–1	Leganés	Las Palmas de Gran Canaria
20:30 CET (UTC+1)	Araujo (yellow card) 41'; Ruiz 63'; Cabrera 86' (pen.); Mesa (yellow card) 87'	Report	Hernández (red card) 45+2'; Shibasaki (yellow card) 49'; Merino (yellow card) 51'; Pardo 70', (yellow card) 71'; Bustinza (yellow card) 84' (yellow-red card) 89'; Ibáñez (yellow card) 90+1'	Stadium: Estadio Gran Canaria; Attendance: 0 Referee: Iosu Galech Apezteguia

1 February 2021 23	Leganés	3–2	Lugo	Leganés
19:00 CET (UTC+1)	Merino 10', 56' (pen.); Pardo 31'	Report	Barreiro 4', 90+4'	Stadium: Estadio Municipal de Butarque; Attendance: 0 Referee: Luis Mario Milla Alvendiz

7 February 2021 24	Girona	0–2	Leganés	Girona
14:00 CET (UTC+1)		Report	Bua 75', 90+2'	Stadium: Montilivi; Attendance: 0 Referee: Eduardo Prieto Iglesias

14 February 2021 25	Leganés	3–1	Albacete	Leganés
18:15 CET (UTC+1)	Pardo 18'; Ibáñez 23'; Merino 81'	Report	Jiménez 71'	Stadium: Estadio Municipal de Butarque; Attendance: 0 Referee: José Antonio López Toca

17 February 2021 21	Leganés	2–1	Almería	Leganés
19:00 CET (UTC+1)	Bastón 48'; Omeruo 90+5'	Report	Sadiq 8'	Stadium: Estadio Municipal de Butarque; Attendance: 0 Referee: Javier Iglesias Villanueva

21 February 2021 26	Leganés	1–0	Tenerife	Leganés
14:00 CET (UTC+1)	Hernández 53'	Report		Stadium: Estadio Municipal de Butarque; Attendance: 0 Referee: Rubén Ávalos Barrera

26 February 2021 27	Cartagena	1–0	Leganés	Cartagena
21:00 CET (UTC+1)	Castro 57'	Report		Stadium: Cartagonova; Attendance: 0 Referee: Jon Ander González Esteban

6 March 2021 28	Leganés	0–0	Castellón	Leganés
18:15 CET (UTC+1)		Report		Stadium: Estadio Municipal de Butarque; Attendance: 0 Referee: Juan Luis Pulido Santana

14 March 2021 29	Oviedo	1–3	Leganés	Oviedo
20:30 CET (UTC+1)	Tejera 53' (pen.)	Report	Hernández 12', 48'; Bua 90+5'	Stadium: Carlos Tartiere; Attendance: 0 Referee: Dámaso Arcediano Monescillo

20 March 2021 30	Leganés	0–2	Fuenlabrada	Leganés
20:30 CET (UTC+1)		Report	Cristóbal 54'; Pulido 77'	Stadium: Estadio Municipal de Butarque; Attendance: 0 Referee: Francisco José Hernández Maeso

27 March 2021 31	Almería	1–1	Leganés	Almeria
18:15 CET (UTC+1)	Fernandes (yellow card) 2'; Morlanes (yellow card) 90+1', (goal) 90+2'; Maraš (yellow card) 90+8'	Report	Pérez (red card) 16'; González (yellow card) 45+1'; Omeruo (yellow card) 73'; Riesgo (yellow card) 90+1'; Muñoz 90+10' (pen.)	Stadium: Estadio de los Juegos Mediterráneos; Attendance: 0 Referee: José Antonio López Toca

1 April 2021 32	Mallorca	1–0	Leganés	Palma
19:00 CEST (UTC+2)	Raíllo 26', (yellow card) 62'; Baba (yellow card) 39'; Oliván (yellow card) 90+4'	Report	Palencia (yellow card) 24'; Pardo (yellow card) 45+1'; Omeruo (yellow card) 81'	Stadium: Visit Mallorca Stadium; Attendance: 0 Referee: Eduardo Prieto Iglesias

4 April 2021 33	Leganés	2–1	Sabadell	Leganés
18:15 CEST (UTC+2)	Arnaiz 7'; Ibáñez 29'	Report	Rubio 59'	Stadium: Estadio Municipal de Butarque; Attendance: 0 Referee: Rafael Sánchez López

11 April 2021 34	Espanyol	2–1	Leganés	Cornellà de Llobregat
21:00 CEST (UTC+2)	Darder 1'; De Tomás (penalty missed) 19'; Melamed 73'	Report	Omeruo (yellow card) 24'; Miguel 51'; Eraso (yellow card) 81'; Pérez (yellow card) 90+5'	Stadium: RCDE Stadium; Attendance: 0 Referee: Javier Iglesias Villanueva

19 April 2021 35	Leganés	1–1	Ponferradina	Leganés
19:00 CEST (UTC+2)	González 32'	Report	Sielva 75'	Stadium: Estadio Municipal de Butarque; Attendance: 0 Referee: Saúl Ais Reig

25 April 2021 36	Alcorcón	1–2	Leganés	Alcorcón
18:15 CEST (UTC+2)	Nwakali 9' (pen.)	Report	Shibasaki 44'; Arnaiz 60'	Stadium: Santo Domingo; Attendance: 0 Referee: Rubén Ávalos Barrera

2 May 2021 37	Leganés	0–0	Sporting Gijón	Leganés
18:15 CEST (UTC+2)	Silva (yellow card) 34'; Eraso (yellow card) 37'; Palencia (yellow card) 51'	Report	Babin (yellow card) 80'; Díaz (yellow card) 87'; Salvador (yellow card) 90'	Stadium: Estadio Municipal de Butarque; Attendance: 0 Referee: Luis Mario Milla Alvendiz

10 May 2021 38	Rayo Vallecano	1–1	Leganés	Madrid
19:00 CEST (UTC+2)	Catena (yellow card) 26'; Valentín (yellow card) 53'; Trejo 58' (pen.), (yellow card) 80'	Report	Miguel 13'; Palencia (yellow card) 28'; Eraso (yellow card) 45+2'; Avilés (yellow card) 73'	Stadium: Vallecas; Attendance: 0 Referee: Daniel Jesús Trujillo Suárez

16 May 2021 39	Leganés	3–0	UD Logroñés	Leganés
21:30 CEST (UTC+2)	Avilés (yellow card) 18'; Silva (yellow card) 20'; Miguel 22', 57'; Merino 81'	Report		Stadium: Estadio Municipal de Butarque; Attendance: 0 Referee: Jon Ander González Esteban

19 May 2021 40	Mirandés	0–0	Leganés	Miranda de Ebro
21:30 CEST (UTC+2)		Report		Stadium: Estadio Municipal de Anduva; Attendance: 0 Referee: Juan Luis Pulido Santana

24 May 2021 41	Leganés	1–0	Málaga	Leganés
21:00 CEST (UTC+2)	Eraso (yellow card) 25'; Miguel (yellow card) 74'; Pérez (yellow card) 83'; Ibáñez 88'	Report	Juande (yellow card) 71'; Escassi (yellow card) 85'	Stadium: Estadio Municipal de Butarque; Attendance: 0 Referee: Rubén Ávalos Barrera

30 May 2021 42	Zaragoza	0–5	Leganés	Zaragoza
21:00 CEST (UTC+2)	Zapater (yellow card) 18'; Narváez (yellow card) 19'; Chavarría (yellow card) 32'; Serrano (yellow card) 34'	Report	Bua 15'; Muñoz 29', 43'; Pardo 48'; Miguel 55'	Stadium: La Romareda; Attendance: 0 Referee: Gorka Sagués Oscoz

==== Promotion play-offs ====
3 June 2021 SF First leg	Rayo Vallecano	3–0	Leganés	Madrid
21:00 CEST (UTC+2)	Catena (yellow card) 37'; Trejo (yellow card) 51'; Saveljich (yellow card) 55'; Á. García 73'; Bebé 76', 90+4'	Report	Pérez (yellow card) 79'; Miguel (yellow card) 90+3'	Stadium: Vallecas; Attendance: 0 Referee: Luis Mario Milla Alvendiz

6 June 2021 SF Second leg	Leganés	1–2 (1–5 agg.)	Rayo Vallecano	Leganés
21:00 CEST (UTC+2)	Ibáñez 11'; Pérez (yellow card) 24'; González (yellow card) 66'; Hernández (yellow card) 83'	Report	Saveljich (yellow card) 4'; Catena (yellow card) 14'; González 67' (o.g.); Martín 80'	Stadium: Estadio Municipal de Butarque; Attendance: 0 Referee: José Antonio López Toca

=== Copa del Rey ===
15 December 2020 First round	Ourense CF	0–1 (a.e.t.)	Leganés	Ourense
20:00 CET (UTC+1)		Report	González 102'	Stadium: O Couto; Referee: Iñaki Vicandi Garrido

6 January 2021 Second round	Socuéllamos	0–2	Leganés	Socuéllamos
13:00 CET (UTC+1)	Dominguez (yellow card) 26'; Morros (yellow card) 63'; Barreto (yellow card) 90'	Report	Bua 7'; Miguel 8'; Ibáñez (red card) 90'	Stadium: Paquito Jiménez; Referee: Gorka Sagués Oscoz

16 January 2021 Round of 32	Leganés	0–1 (a.e.t.)	Sevilla	Madrid (Note: Given the impossibility of being able to play the match at the Butarque stadium in Leganés due to the consequences of the “Filomena” storm.)
20:00 CET (UTC+1)	Rosales (yellow card) 19'; Pardo (yellow card) 89'; Shibasaki (yellow card) 114'; Bustinza (yellow card) 119'	Report	Vidal (yellow card) 23'; Gudelj (yellow card) 57'; Ocampos 96'	Stadium: Wanda Metropolitano; Referee: Pablo González Fuertes

== Statistics ==
=== Goalscorers ===
As of 6 June 2021

Rank	No.	Pos	Nat	Name	Segunda División	Copa del Rey	Total
1	9	FW	(Spain)	Sabin Merino	9	0	9
2	10	FW	(Spain)	José Arnaiz	6	0	6
2	29	FW	(Spain)	Miguel de la Fuente	5	1	6
4	11	FW	(Spain)	Juan Muñoz	5	0	5
4	24	FW	(Spain)	Borja Bastón	5	0	5
4	22	MF	(Switzerland)	Kevin Bua	4	1	5
7	25	MF	(Spain)	Rubén Pardo	4	0	4
8	18	MF	(Spain)	Robert Ibáñez	3	0	3
8	28	DF	(Spain)	Javi Hernández	3	0	3
10	8	MF	(Japan)	Gaku Shibasaki	2	0	2
10	6	DF	(Spain)	Sergio González	1	1	2
12	4	DF	(Nigeria)	Kenneth Omeruo	1	0	1
12	16	DF	(Venezuela)	Roberto Rosales	1	0	1
Own goals					2	0	2
Totals					51	3	54
