= 2021–22 CD Leganés season =

CD Leganés
2021–22 season
- President: María Victoria Pavón
- Head coach: Asier Garitano (until 30 October); Mehdi Nafti (from 31 October)
- Stadium: Estadio Municipal de Butarque
- Segunda División: 12th
- Copa del Rey: Round of 32
- Top goalscorer: League: José Arnaiz (7); All: José Arnaiz (7)

The 2021–22 season was the 94th season in the existence of CD Leganés and the club's second consecutive season in the second division of Spanish football. In addition to the domestic league, Leganés participated in this season's edition of the Copa del Rey.

== Players ==
=== First-team squad ===
As of 31 January 2022

Note: Flags indicate national team as defined under FIFA eligibility rules; some limited exceptions apply. Players may hold more than one non-FIFA nationality.

No.	Pos.	Nation	Player
1	GK	ESP	Iván Villar (on loan from Celta)
2	DF	ESP	Sergi Palencia (on loan from Saint-Étienne)
3	DF	ESP	Unai Bustinza (captain)
4	DF	NGR	Kenneth Omeruo
5	DF	ESP	Bruno González
6	DF	ESP	Sergio González
7	MF	ESP	Rober (on loan from Osasuna)
8	MF	JPN	Gaku Shibasaki
10	FW	ESP	José Arnaiz
11	FW	ESP	Juan Muñoz
12	MF	SRB	Lazar Ranđelović (on loan from Olympiacos)
13	GK	ESP	Asier Riesgo
14	MF	ESP	Recio
15	DF	FRA	Jimmy Giraudon (on loan from Troyes)

No.	Pos.	Nation	Player
16	DF	ESP	Xavi Quintillà (on loan from Villarreal)
17	MF	ESP	Javier Eraso (vice-captain)
18	MF	ESP	Rubén Pardo
19	MF	ESP	Luis Perea
20	DF	ESP	Javi Hernández
21	FW	MAR	Yacine Qasmi
22	DF	CMR	Allan Nyom
23	FW	PAN	Yoel Bárcenas (on loan from Tijuana)
24	FW	ESP	Jon Bautista (on loan from Real Sociedad)
25	GK	ESP	Dani Jiménez
28	FW	ESP	Borja Garcés (on loan from Atlético Madrid)
32	MF	GUI	Seydouba Cissé
34	MF	ESP	Naim García
—	MF	ESP	Fede Vico

=== Reserve team ===
Note: Flags indicate national team as defined under FIFA eligibility rules; some limited exceptions apply. Players may hold more than one non-FIFA nationality.

No.	Pos.	Nation	Player
26	DF	ESP	Javi Rubio
27	DF	ESP	Álex Alda
30	GK	ESP	Javier Garrido
33	FW	ESP	Diego García
35	GK	ESP	Adri Víctores

No.	Pos.	Nation	Player
36	FW	ESP	Marc Echarri
37	DF	ESP	David Alba
38	DF	GHA	Felix Ofoli Quaye
40	DF	ESP	Joserra de Diego
42	FW	ESP	Mario Rivas

=== Out on loan ===
Note: Flags indicate national team as defined under FIFA eligibility rules; some limited exceptions apply. Players may hold more than one non-FIFA nationality.

No.	Pos.	Nation	Player
—	DF	UKR	Vasyl Kravets (at Sporting Gijón until 30 June 2022)
—	DF	VEN	Josua Mejías (at Beitar Jerusalem until 30 June 2022)
—	MF	BRA	Cássio Júnior (at Atlético Baleares until 30 June 2022)
—	MF	ARG	Facundo García (at Sabadell until 30 June 2022)

No.	Pos.	Nation	Player
—	FW	ESP	Javier Avilés (at Tondela until 30 June 2022)
—	FW	ESP	Manu Garrido (at UCAM Murcia until 30 June 2022)
—	FW	BRA	William (at Deportivo La Coruña until 30 June 2022)

== Pre-season and friendlies ==
Win Draw Loss

28 July 2021 Friendly	Leganés	2–1	Rayo Majadahonda	Leganés, Spain
19:00 CEST (UTC+2)				Stadium: Instalación Deportiva Butarque

31 July 2021 Friendly	Real Madrid Castilla	0–1	Leganés	Madrid, Spain
19:00 CEST (UTC+2)				Stadium: Alfredo Di Stéfano

4 August 2021 Friendly	Leganés	0–2	Fuenlabrada	Leganés, Spain
19:00 CEST (UTC+2)				Stadium: Instalación Deportiva Butarque

7 August 2021 Friendly	Leganés	2–0	Alcorcón	Leganés, Spain
10:00 CEST (UTC+2)				Stadium: Instalación Deportiva Butarque

7 August 2021 Friendly	Leganés	1–1	Rayo Vallecano	Leganés, Spain
19:00 CEST (UTC+2)				Stadium: Butarque

16 August 2021 Friendly	Leganés	3–0	SS Reyes	Spain
10:00 CEST (UTC+2)

== Competitions ==
=== Overall record ===
Competition	First match	Last match	Starting round	Final position	Record							
Competition	First match	Last match	Starting round	Final position	Pld	W	D	L	GF	GA	GD	Win %
Segunda División	14 August 2021	29 May 2022	Matchday 1	12th	42	13	15	14	50	51	−1	30.95
Copa del Rey	2 December 2021	5 January 2022	First round	Round of 32	3	2	0	1	7	6	+1	66.67
Total					45	15	15	15	57	57	+0	33.33

Source: Soccerway

=== Segunda División ===
==== League table ====
Pos	Team	Pld	W	D	L	GF	GA	GD	Pts
10	Zaragoza	42	12	20	10	39	46	−7	56
11	Burgos	42	15	10	17	41	41	0	55
12	Leganés	42	13	15	14	50	51	−1	54 (Note: Leganés finished ahead of Huesca on head-to-head points: Leganés 2–1 Huesca, Huesca 0–2 Leganés.)
13	Huesca	42	13	15	14	49	44	+5	54
14	Mirandés	42	15	7	20	58	62	−4	52 (Note: Mirandés finished ahead of Ibiza on head-to-head points: Mirandés 4–0 Ibiza, Ibiza 0–2 Mirandés.)

Source: LaLiga SmartBank
Rules for classification: 1) points; 2) head-to-head points; 3) head-to-head goal difference; 4) goal difference; 5) number of goals scored

==== Results summary ====
Overall								Home						Away					
Pld	W	D	L	GF	GA	GD	Pts	W	D	L	GF	GA	GD	W	D	L	GF	GA	GD
42	13	15	14	50	51	−1	54	7	9	5	27	25	+2	6	6	9	23	26	−3

Source: La Liga SmartBank

==== Results by round ====
Round	1	2	3	4	5	6	7	8	9	10	11	12	13	14	15	16	17	18	19	20	21	22	23	24	25	26	27	28	29	30	31	32	33	34	35	36	37	38	39	40	41	42
Ground	A	H	H	A	A	H	A	H	A	H	A	H	A	H	A	H	A	H	A	H	A	A	H	A	H	A	H	A	H	H	A	H	A	H	A	H	A	H	A	H	A	H
Result	L	D	L	D	L	W	W	D	L	L	D	L	L	D	W	D	W	W	L	D	W	L	D	L	W	D	W	W	D	W	D	D	L	W	L	L	D	W	D	L	W	D
Position	19	17	19	21	22	20	14	16	18	19	20	20	20	21	19	20	18	16	17	18	15	17	17	18	17	16	15	14	14	13	13	13	15	12	16	16	15	13	13	13	12	12

Source: La Liga SmartBank
A = Away; H = Home; W = Win; D = Draw; L = Loss

==== Matches ====
The league fixtures were announced on 30 June 2021.

14 August 2021 1	Real Sociedad B	1–0	Leganés	San Sebastián
17:00 CEST (UTC+2)	Karrikaburu 57'	Report		Stadium: Anoeta; Referee: Víctor García Verdura

23 August 2021 2	Leganés	0–0	Burgos	Leganés
22:00 CEST (UTC+2)		Report		Stadium: Butarque; Referee: Rafael Sánchez López

28 August 2021 3	Leganés	1–2	Ibiza	Leganés
19:30 CEST (UTC+2)	Arnaiz 59'	Report	Castel 57'; Zenitagoia 80'	Stadium: Butarque; Attendance: 4,454; Referee: Alejandro Quintero González

4 September 2021 4	Eibar	1–1	Leganés	Eibar
16:00 CEST (UTC+2)	Expósito 40'	Report	Cantero 24' (o.g.)	Stadium: Ipurua; Referee: Luis Mario Milla Alvendiz

10 September 2021 5	Sporting Gijón	2–1	Leganés	Gijón
21:00 CEST (UTC+2)	García 4'; Villalba 62'	Report	Merino 79'	Stadium: El Molinón; Attendance: 11,212; Referee: Javier Iglesias Villanueva

18 September 2021 6	Leganés	1–0	Amorebieta	Leganés
18:15 CEST (UTC+2)	Ranđelović 15'	Report		Stadium: Butarque; Attendance: 6,342; Referee: Daniel Jesús Trujillo Suárez

26 September 2021 7	Mirandés	1–2	Leganés	Miranda de Ebro
14:00 CEST (UTC+2)				Stadium: Estadio Municipal de Anduva

29 October 2021 13	Almería	1–0	Leganés	Almería
21:00 CET	Portillo 30'; Sergio Akieme (yellow card) 89'	Report	Ranđelović (yellow card) 5'; Sergio González (red card) 90+2'	Stadium: Estadio de los Juegos Mediterráneos; Attendance: 8,867; Referee: Iosu Galech Apezteguía

29 May 2022 42	Leganés	2–2	Almería	Leganés
20:00 CET	Borja Garcés 9'; Omeruo 42' (yellow card) 84'; Sergi Palencia (yellow card) 48'; Bruno (yellow card) 57'; Asier Riesgo (yellow card) 82'	Report	Rodrigo Ely 15' (yellow card) 90+6'; Babić (yellow card) 25'; Sadiq 53'; Dyego Sousa (yellow card) 90'	Stadium: Estadio Municipal de Butarque; Attendance: 8,645; Referee: (Spain) Dámaso Arcediano Monescillo
