= 2018–19 CD Leganés season =

CD Leganés
2018–19 season
- President: María Victoria Pavón
- Head coach: Mauricio Pellegrino
- Stadium: Butarque
- La Liga: 13th
- Copa del Rey: Round of 16
- Top goalscorer: League: Youssef En-Nesyri (9); All: Youssef En-Nesyri (11)
Home colours	Away colours	Third colours

During the 2018–19 season, CD Leganés are participating in La Liga and Copa del Rey.

== Players ==
As of 31 August 2018

Note: Flags indicate national team as defined under FIFA eligibility rules; some limited exceptions apply. Players may hold more than one non-FIFA nationality.

No.	Pos.	Nation	Player
1	GK	ESP	Iván Cuéllar
2	DF	ESP	Juanfran (on loan from Deportivo La Coruña)
3	DF	ESP	Unai Bustinza (vice-captain)
4	FW	URU	Diego Rolán (on loan from Deportivo La Coruña)
5	DF	ARG	Jonathan Silva (on loan from Sporting CP)
6	MF	ESP	Gerard Gumbau
7	FW	ESP	Dani Ojeda
8	MF	ESP	Recio
9	FW	ARG	Guido Carrillo (on loan from Southampton)
10	MF	MAR	Nabil El Zhar
11	MF	ARG	Alexander Szymanowski
12	DF	CMR	Allan Nyom (on loan from West Bromwich Albion)
13	GK	ESP	Jon Ander Serantes (captain)
14	DF	ESP	Raúl García

No.	Pos.	Nation	Player
15	DF	ARG	Mauro dos Santos
16	MF	ESP	José Arnaiz
17	MF	ESP	Javier Eraso
18	MF	ESP	Sabin Merino (on loan from Athletic Bilbao)
19	DF	ARG	Ezequiel Muñoz
20	FW	URU	Michael Santos (on loan from Málaga)
21	MF	ESP	Rubén Pérez (2nd vice-captain)
22	DF	GRE	Dimitris Siovas
23	MF	ESP	Mikel Vesga (on loan from Athletic Bilbao)
24	DF	NGR	Kenneth Omeruo (on loan from Chelsea)
26	FW	MAR	Youssef En-Nesyri
27	MF	ESP	Óscar (on loan from Real Madrid)
28	DF	ESP	Rodrigo Tarín
29	GK	UKR	Andriy Lunin (on loan from Real Madrid)

=== Reserve team ===
Note: Flags indicate national team as defined under FIFA eligibility rules; some limited exceptions apply. Players may hold more than one non-FIFA nationality.

No.	Pos.	Nation	Player
33	MF	ESP	Javier Avilés
68	MF	CAN	Bile Hood

=== Out on loan ===
Note: Flags indicate national team as defined under FIFA eligibility rules; some limited exceptions apply. Players may hold more than one non-FIFA nationality.

No.	Pos.	Nation	Player
—	DF	VEN	Josua Mejías (at Gimnàstic until 30 June 2019)
—	MF	ARG	Facundo García (at AEK Larnaca until 30 June 2019)
—	MF	ESP	Fede Vico (at Granada until 30 June 2019)
—	FW	ESP	Gabri Salazar (at Burgos until 30 June 2019)

No.	Pos.	Nation	Player
—	FW	CIV	Mamadou Koné (at Málaga until 30 June 2019)
—	FW	GUI	Moussa Camara (at Salmantino until 30 June 2019)
—	FW	GHA	Owusu Kwabena (at Salmantino until 30 June 2019)
—	FW	BRA	William (at Karpaty Lviv until 30 June 2019)

== Transfers ==
=== In ===
Date	Player	From	Type	Fee	Ref
27 June 2018	(Spain) Rodrigo Tarín	(Spain) Barcelona B	Transfer	Free	
28 June 2018	(Spain) Dani Ojeda	(Spain) Lorca	Transfer	Free	
30 June 2018	(Ivory Coast) Mamadou Koné	(Belgium) Eupen	Loan return		
30 June 2018	(Ghana) Owusu Kwabena	(Spain) Cartagena	Loan return		
2 July 2018	(Venezuela) Josua Mejías	(Venezuela) Carabobo	Transfer	€455,000	
4 July 2018	(Spain) Mikel Vesga	(Spain) Athletic Bilbao	Loan		
5 July 2018	(Spain) Fede Vico	(Spain) Lugo	Transfer	Free	
6 July 2018	(Spain) Rubén Pérez	(Spain) Granada	Transfer	Free	
8 July 2018	(Argentina) Guido Carrillo	(England) Southampton	Loan		
9 July 2018	(Argentina) Facundo García	(Argentina) Olimpo	Transfer	Undisclosed	
12 July 2018	(Spain) Juanfran	(Spain) Deportivo La Coruña	Loan		
24 July 2018	(Argentina) Jonathan Silva	(Portugal) Sporting CP	Loan		
26 July 2018	(Uruguay) Diego Rolán	(Spain) Deportivo La Coruña	Loan		
1 August 2018	(Uruguay) Michael Santos	(Spain) Málaga	Loan		
13 August 2018	(Spain) José Arnaiz	(Spain) Barcelona B	Transfer	€5,000,000	
13 August 2018	(Spain) Óscar	(Spain) Real Madrid Castilla	Loan		
15 August 2018	(Nigeria) Kenneth Omeruo	(England) Chelsea	Loan	€800,000	
17 August 2018	(Morocco) Youssef En-Nesyri	(Spain) Málaga	Transfer	€6,000,000	
17 August 2018	(Cameroon) Allan Nyom	(England) West Bromwich Albion	Loan		
27 August 2018	(Ukraine) Andriy Lunin	(Spain) Real Madrid	Loan		
31 August 2018	(Spain) Sabin Merino	(Spain) Athletic Bilbao	Loan		
31 August 2018	(Spain) Recio	(Spain) Málaga	Transfer	€1,500,000	

=== Out ===
Date	Player	To	Type	Fee	Ref
13 June 2018	(Spain) Miguel Ángel Guerrero	(Greece) Olympiacos	Transfer	Free	
15 June 2018	(Argentina) Martín Mantovani	(Spain) Las Palmas	Transfer	Free	
30 June 2018	(Saudi Arabia) Yahya Al-Shehri	(Saudi Arabia) Al-Nassr	Loan return		
30 June 2018	(Morocco) Nordin Amrabat	(England) Watford	Loan return		
30 June 2018	(Guadeloupe) Claudio Beauvue	(Spain) Celta Vigo	Loan return		
30 June 2018	(Serbia) Darko Brašanac	(Spain) Real Betis	Loan return		
30 June 2018	(Spain) José Naranjo	(Belgium) Genk	Loan return		
30 June 2018	(Spain) Rubén Pérez	(Spain) Granada	Loan return		
30 June 2018	(Spain) Joseba Zaldúa	(Spain) Real Sociedad	Loan return		
3 July 2018	(Argentina) Nereo Champagne	(Argentina) Olimpo	Loan return		
9 July 2018	(Spain) Fede Vico	(Spain) Granada	Loan		
24 July 2018	(Ghana) Owusu Kwabena	(Spain) Salmantino	Loan		
24 July 2018	(Spain) Diego Rico	(England) AFC Bournemouth	Transfer	£10,800,000	
29 July 2018	(Spain) Tito	(Spain) Rayo Vallecano	Transfer	Free	
30 July 2018	(Venezuela) Josua Mejías	(Spain) Gimnàstic	Loan		
17 August 2018	(Ivory Coast) Mamadou Koné	(Spain) Málaga	Loan		
21 August 2018	(Argentina) Facundo García	(Cyprus) AEK Larnaca	Loan		
27 August 2018	(Brazil) Gabriel	(Portugal) Benfica	Transfer	€10,000,000	

== Competitions ==
=== La Liga ===
==== League table ====
Pos	Team	Pld	W	D	L	GF	GA	GD	Pts
11	Alavés	38	13	11	14	39	50	−11	50 (Note: Real Sociedad finished ahead of Real Betis and Alavés on head-to-head points: Real Sociedad 6, Real Betis 5, Alavés 5. Real Betis finished ahead of Alavés on goal difference: Real Betis –8, Alavés –11.)
12	Eibar	38	11	14	13	46	50	−4	47
13	Leganés	38	11	12	15	37	43	−6	45
14	Villarreal	38	10	14	14	49	52	−3	44 (Note: Villarreal finished ahead of Levante on head-to-head points: Villarreal 1–1 Levante, Levante 0–2 Villarreal.)
15	Levante	38	11	11	16	59	66	−7	44

Source: La Liga, Soccerway
Rules for classification: 1) Points; 2) Head-to-head points; 3) Head-to-head goal difference; 4) Goal difference; 5) Goals scored; 6) Fair-play points (Note: Head-to-head record is used only after all the matches between the teams in question have been played)

==== Results summary ====
Overall								Home						Away					
Pld	W	D	L	GF	GA	GD	Pts	W	D	L	GF	GA	GD	W	D	L	GF	GA	GD
38	11	12	15	37	43	−6	45	7	8	4	19	16	+3	4	4	11	18	27	−9

Last updated: 18 May 2019.
Source: Competitive matches

==== Results by round ====
Round	1	2	3	4	5	6	7	8	9	10	11	12	13	14	15	16	17	18	19	20	21	22	23	24	25	26	27	28	29	30	31	32	33	34	35	36	37	38
Ground	A	H	A	H	A	H	A	H	A	A	H	A	H	A	H	A	H	A	H	A	H	A	H	A	H	H	A	H	A	H	A	H	A	H	H	A	H	A
Result	L	D	L	L	L	W	L	W	D	L	D	D	W	W	D	D	D	L	W	L	D	W	W	L	D	W	L	L	W	W	D	D	L	L	D	W	L	L
Position	15	12	19	20	20	18	20	18	18	18	18	18	17	16	16	16	16	16	14	15	16	13	11	13	12	11	13	15	12	12	12	11	12	12	13	12	13	13

Updated to match(es) played on 18 May 2019. Source: Competitive matches
A = Away; H = Home; W = Win; D = Draw; L = Loss

==== Matches ====
Win Draw Loss Fixtures

20 August 2018 1	Athletic Bilbao	2–1	Leganés	Bilbao
22:00 CEST (UTC+02:00)	Yeray (yellow card) 17'; Nolaskoain 27'; Berchiche (yellow card) 53'; R. García (yellow card) 78'; Muniain 90+3', (yellow card) 90+4'	Report	Silva 33', (yellow card) 81'; R. García (yellow card) 41'; Carrillo (yellow card) 55'; Gumbau (yellow card) 76'; Santos (yellow card) 88'	Stadium: San Mamés; Attendance: 38,575; Referee: Adrián Cordero Vega

24 August 2018 2	Leganés	2–2	Real Sociedad	Leganés
22:15 CEST (UTC+02:00)	El Zhar 54', 88'; Silva (yellow card) 90+2'	Report	Zurutuza 11'; Illarramendi 17'; Zaldúa (yellow card) 53'; Juanmi (yellow card) 80'	Stadium: Butarque; Attendance: 8,951; Referee: José Luis Munuera Montero

1 September 2018 3	Real Madrid	4–1	Leganés	Madrid
20:45 CEST (UTC+02:00)	Modrić (yellow card) 3'; Bale 17'; Benzema 48', 61'; Ramos 66' (pen.)	Report	Carrillo 24' (pen.); Santos (yellow card) 27'	Stadium: Santiago Bernabéu; Attendance: 59,255; Referee: Santiago Jaime Latre

16 September 2018 4	Leganés	0–1	Villarreal	Leganés
12:00 CEST (UTC+02:00)	Silva (yellow card) 27'; Nyom (yellow card) 64'; Pérez (yellow card) 82'; Bustinza (yellow card) 90+4'	Report	Costa (yellow card) 45'; Mario Gaspar (yellow card) 48'; Bacca 65'; Ruiz (yellow card) 90+4'	Stadium: Municipal de Butarque; Attendance: 9,775; Referee: Pablo González Fuertes

22 September 2018 5	Eibar	1–0	Leganés	Eibar
16:15 CEST (UTC+02:00)	Escalante (yellow card) 24'; Kike 52'	Report	Gumbau (yellow card) 67'	Stadium: Ipurua; Attendance: 4,456; Referee: Mario Melero López

26 September 2018 6	Leganés	2–1	Barcelona	Leganés
20:00 CEST (UTC+02:00)	Pérez (yellow card) 40'; Bustinza (yellow card) 49'; El Zhar 52'; Óscar 53'; Nyom (yellow card) 88'; En-Nesyri (yellow card) 90+2'	Report	Coutinho 12'; Umtiti (yellow card) 60'; Vermaelen (yellow card) 64'	Stadium: Butarque; Attendance: 12,231; Referee: Alberto Undiano Mallenco

30 September 2018 7	Real Betis	1–0	Leganés	Seville
20:45 CEST (UTC+02:00)	Loren 89'	Report	En-Nesyri (yellow card) 3'; Bustinza (yellow card) 38'; Cuéllar (yellow card) 87'; Pérez (yellow card) 90+4'	Stadium: Benito Villamarín; Attendance: 47,678; Referee: José María Sánchez Martínez

6 October 2018 8	Leganés	1–0	Rayo Vallecano	Leganés
20:45 CEST (UTC+02:00)	Carrillo 14'; Óscar (yellow card) 43'	Report	Medrán (yellow card) 43' (yellow-red card) 82'; Embarba (yellow card) 55'; Ba (yellow card) 80'	Stadium: Municipal de Butarque; Attendance: 11,539; Referee: David Medié Jiménez

20 October 2018 9	Valencia	1–1	Leganés	Valencia
16:15 CEST (UTC+02:00)	Gayà 85'; Parejo (yellow card) 90+3'	Report	Óscar (yellow card) 33'; Gumbau (yellow card) 48', (goal) 63' (pen.)	Stadium: Mestalla; Attendance: 35,711; Referee: Ignacio Iglesias Villanueva

27 October 2018 10	Levante	2–0	Leganés	Valencia
18:30 CEST (UTC+02:00)	Roger 14'; Campana (yellow card) 61'; Róber (yellow card) 83'; Rochina 90'	Report	Siovas (yellow card) 53'; Omeruo (yellow card) 70'	Stadium: Ciutat de València; Attendance: 19,754; Referee: Ricardo de Burgos Bengoetxea

4 November 2018 11	Leganés	1–1	Atlético Madrid	Leganés
13:00 CET (UTC+01:00)	En-Nesyri (yellow card) 13'; Silva (yellow card) 53'; Carrillo 82'; Cuellar (yellow card) 85'; Santos (yellow card) 90+2'	Report	Hernandez (yellow card) 29'; Griezmann 69'; Kalinić (yellow card) 90'	Stadium: Municipal de Butarque; Attendance: 11,157; Referee: Mario Melero López

11 November 2018 12	Girona	0–0	Leganés	Girona
20:45 CET (UTC+01:00)	Lozano (yellow card) 90'	Report	Óscar (yellow card) 19'; Eraso (yellow card) 69'; Ojeda (yellow card) 71'; Carrillo (yellow card) 90+1'	Stadium: Montilivi; Attendance: 9,715; Referee: Adrián Cordero Vega

23 November 2018 13	Leganés	1–0	Alavés	Leganés
21:00 CET (UTC+01:00)	Óscar (yellow card) 15'; En-Nesyri 42'; Nyom (yellow card) 62'	Report	Duarte (yellow card) 49'; Brašanac (yellow card) 52'; Aguirregabiria (yellow card) 73'; Borja Bastón (yellow card) 75'	Stadium: Municipal de Butarque; Attendance: 8,917; Referee: Javier Alberola Rojas

1 December 2018 14	Valladolid	2–4	Leganés	Valladolid
16:15 CET (UTC+01:00)	Toni 50'; Ünal 90+3'	Report	Siovas 11'; Pérez (yellow card) 15'; Óscar 42'; Silva (yellow card) 62'; Carrillo 66', 75'; Nyom (yellow card) 78'	Stadium: José Zorrilla; Attendance: 16,783; Referee: David Medié Jiménez

7 December 2018 15	Leganés	1–1	Getafe	Leganés
21:00 CET (UTC+01:00)	Nyom (yellow card) 49', (goal) 64'; Pérez (red card) 90+3'	Report	Cabrera 39'; Mata (yellow card) 42'; Djené (yellow card) 75'	Stadium: Municipal de Butarque; Attendance: 11,327; Referee: Pablo González Fuertes

14 December 2018 16	Celta Vigo	0–0	Leganés	Vigo
21:00 CET (UTC+01:00)	Juncà (yellow card) 28'; Gómez (yellow card) 35'; Costas (yellow card) 85'	Report	En-Nesyri (yellow card) 17'; Vesga (yellow card) 24'; Cuéllar (yellow card) 90+3'	Stadium: Abanca-Balaídos; Attendance: 15,134; Referee: José Luis Munuera Montero

23 December 2018 17	Leganés	1–1	Sevilla	Leganés
16:15 CET (UTC+01:00)	Vesga 5'; Nyom (yellow card) 17'; Pérez (yellow card) 59'; J. Silva (yellow card) 70'	Report	Ben Yedder (yellow card) 44', (goal) 90+1'; Mercado (yellow card) 45'; Vázquez (red card) 45'; A. Silva (yellow card) 67'	Stadium: Municipal de Butarque; Attendance: 11,321; Referee: Alejandro Hernández Hernández

4 January 2019 18	Espanyol	1–0	Leganés	Barcelona
21:00 CET (UTC+01:00)	Iglesias 9'; Vilà (yellow card) 35'; Roca (yellow card) 68'	Report	Bustinza (yellow card) 20'; Recio (yellow card) 67'; Gumbau (yellow card) 70' (yellow-red card) 90+1'; Omeruo (yellow card) 72'	Stadium: RCDE Stadium; Attendance: 15,085; Referee: José Luis González González

12 January 2019 19	Leganés	1–0	Huesca	Leganés
13:00 CET (UTC+01:00)	Siovas (yellow card) 35'; Bustinza (yellow card) 58'; En-Nesyri 73'; Silva (yellow card) 89'	Report	Melero (yellow card) 30'; Santamaría (yellow card) 65'; Pulido (yellow card) 67'	Stadium: Municipal de Butarque; Attendance: 10,341; Referee: Mario Melero López

20 January 2019 20	Barcelona	3–1	Leganés	Barcelona
20:45 CET (UTC+01:00)	Busquets (yellow card) 12'; Dembélé 32'; Aleñá (yellow card) 54'; Roberto (yellow card) 60'; L. Suárez 71'; Messi 90+2'	Report	Braithwaite (yellow card) 8', (goal) 57'; Tarín (yellow card) 22'; Omeruo (yellow card) 30'	Stadium: Camp Nou; Attendance: 50,670; Referee: Ricardo de Burgos Bengoetxea

26 January 2019 21	Leganés	2–2	Eibar	Leganés
18:30 CET (UTC+01:00)	Siovas (yellow card) 35'; En-Nesyri 46', 67'; Recio (yellow card) 52'	Report	Kike 29'; Jordán 36'; Cucurella (yellow card) 38'; Dmitrović (yellow card) 66'; Charles (yellow card) 88'	Stadium: Municipal de Butarque; Attendance: 9,341; Referee: Alejandro Hernández Hernández

4 February 2019 22	Rayo Vallecano	1–2	Leganés	Madrid
21:00 CET (UTC+01:00)	Ba (yellow card) 1'; Amat (yellow card) 8'; Trejo (yellow card) 40'; Medrán (yellow card) 49'; Di Santo (yellow card) 73'; García 83'; Velázquez (yellow card) 90'	Report	Silva (yellow card) 13'; Braithwaite 36'; Bustinza (yellow card) 51'; Recio (yellow card) 54'; Nyom (red card) 58'; En-Nesyri 85'; Cuéllar (yellow card) 90+4'	Stadium: Vallecas; Attendance: 11,435; Referee: Juan Martínez Munuera

10 February 2019 23	Leganés	3–0	Real Betis	Leganés
12:00 CET (UTC+01:00)	En-Nesyri 22', 36', 66'; Vesga (yellow card) 26'; Omeruo (yellow card) 53'; Recio (yellow card) 76'; Braithwaite (yellow card) 90+2'	Report	Barragán (yellow card) 28'; García (red card) 80'; Lainez (yellow card) 89'	Stadium: Municipal de Butarque; Attendance: 11,381; Referee: Javier Alberola Rojas

16 February 2019 24	Real Sociedad	3–0	Leganés	San Sebastián
18:30 CET (UTC+01:00)	Llorente (yellow card) 21'; Willian José (yellow card) 45', (goal) 75'; Oyarzabal 50', 59'; Navas (yellow card) 63'; Hernandez (yellow card) 90'	Report	Siovas (yellow card) 45'; Bustinza (yellow card) 89'	Stadium: Anoeta; Attendance: 22,997; Referee: José Luis Munuera Montero

24 February 2019 25	Leganés	1–1	Valencia	Leganés
12:00 CET (UTC+01:00)	Kravets (yellow card) 21'; Óscar (yellow card) 69'; Bustinza (yellow card) 72'; Pérez (yellow card) 84'; Braithwaite 89'; En-Nesyri (yellow card) 90+4'	Report	Kondogbia 22'; Gayà (yellow card) 25'; Neto (yellow card) 68'; Gameiro (yellow card) 90'	Stadium: Municipal de Butarque; Attendance: 11,425; Referee: Xavier Estrada Fernández

4 March 2019 26	Leganés	1–0	Levante	Leganés
21:00 CET (UTC+01:00)	Óscar 13', (yellow card) 90+5'; Recio (yellow card) 44'; Reyes (yellow card) 65'; Cuéllar (yellow card) 70'; Siovas (yellow card) 82'; Tarín (yellow card) 87'	Report	Cabaco (yellow card) 30'; Vezo (yellow card) 82'; Jason (yellow card) 86'; Coke (yellow card) 86'	Stadium: Municipal de Butarque; Attendance: 9,758; Referee: Jesús Gil Manzano

9 March 2019 27	Atlético Madrid	1–0	Leganés	Madrid
16:15 CET (UTC+01:00)	Giménez (yellow card) 14'; Saúl 50'; Lemar (yellow card) 53'	Report	Braithwaite (yellow card) 15'; Pérez (yellow card) 65'	Stadium: Wanda Metropolitano; Attendance: 58,321; Referee: Antonio Mateu Lahoz

16 March 2019 28	Leganés	0–2	Girona	Leganés
20:45 CET (UTC+01:00)	Nyom (yellow card) 32'; Braithwaite (yellow card) 38'; Kravets (yellow card) 45+2'; En-Nesyri (yellow card) 52'; Recio (yellow card) 61'; Omeruo (yellow card) 63'; Carrillo (yellow card) 90+3'; Santos (yellow card) 90+4'	Report	Portu 13', 22'; Muniesa (yellow card) 17'	Stadium: Municipal de Butarque; Attendance: 9,873; Referee: José Luis Munuera Montero

30 March 2019 29	Getafe	0–2	Leganés	Getafe
13:00 CET (UTC+01:00)	Maksimović (yellow card) 17'; Suárez (yellow card) 65'; Olivera (yellow card) 70'; Djené (yellow card) 86'; Flamini (yellow card) 90+1'	Report	Santos 49'; Braithwaite (yellow card) 65'; Carrillo (yellow card) 68'; Juanfran 83'	Stadium: Coliseum Alfonso Pérez; Attendance: 12,705; Referee: Pablo González Fuertes

4 April 2019 30	Leganés	1–0	Valladolid	Leganés
20:30 CEST (UTC+02:00)	Vesga (yellow card) 78'; Carrillo 90+6', (yellow card) 90+7'	Report	Nacho (yellow card) 77'; Moyano (yellow card) 90+7'	Stadium: Municipal de Butarque; Attendance: 10,185; Referee: Guillermo Cuadra Fernández

7 April 2019 31	Alavés	1–1	Leganés	Vitoria-Gasteiz
12:00 CEST (UTC+02:00)	Calleri 18' (pen.); Pina (yellow card) 32'; García (yellow card) 48'; Aguirregabiria (yellow card) 48'; Duarte (yellow card) 69'; Ely (yellow card) 76'; Twumasi (yellow card) 87'	Report	Bustinza (yellow card) 17'; Eraso (yellow card) 19'; Gumbau (yellow card) 44'; Silva (yellow card) 58', (goal) 90+3'	Stadium: Mendizorrotza; Attendance: 16,783; Referee: Antonio Mateu Lahoz

15 April 2019 32	Leganés	1–1	Real Madrid	Leganés
21:00 CEST (UTC+02:00)	Silva 45'	Report	Carvajal (yellow card) 48'; Benzema 51'; Asensio (yellow card) 61'; Valverde (yellow card) 67'	Stadium: Municipal de Butarque; Attendance: 12,118; Referee: David Medié Jiménez

21 April 2019 33	Villarreal	2–1	Leganés	Villarreal
18:30 CEST (UTC+02:00)	Bacca 64'; Toko Ekambi 80'; Fernández (yellow card) 90'; Cáseres (yellow card) 90+1'	Report	El Zhar 87' (pen.); Omeruo (yellow card) 90'	Stadium: Estadio de la Cerámica; Attendance: 14,661; Referee: Eduardo Prieto Iglesias

24 April 2019 34	Leganés	0–1	Athletic Bilbao	Leganés
20:30 CEST (UTC+02:00)	Tarín (yellow card) 39'	Report	En-Nesyri 43' (o.g.); Córdoba (yellow card) 44'; Lekue (yellow card) 90+3'	Stadium: Municipal de Butarque; Attendance: 4,155; Referee: Ignacio Iglesias Villanueva

27 April 2019 35	Leganés	0–0	Celta Vigo	Leganés
18:30 CEST (UTC+02:00)	Recio (yellow card) 45'	Report		Stadium: Municipal de Butarque; Attendance: 10,324; Referee: Juan Martínez Munuera

3 May 2019 36	Sevilla	0–3	Leganés	Seville
21:00 CEST (UTC+02:00)	Sarabia (yellow card) 45'	Report	En-Nesyri 8'; Braithwaite 20'; Recio (yellow card) 63'; Óscar 82'	Stadium: Ramón Sánchez Pizjuán; Attendance: 32,797; Referee: Alberto Undiano Mallenco

12 May 2019 37	Leganés	0–2	Espanyol	Leganés
18:30 CEST (UTC+02:00)	Bustinza (yellow card) 29' (yellow-red card) 45'; Recio (yellow card) 38'; En-Nesyri (yellow card) 90+3'	Report	Iglesias 35', 71' (pen.); Ferreyra (yellow card) 90+4'	Stadium: Municipal de Butarque; Attendance: 10,597; Referee: Mario Melero López

18 May 2019 38	Huesca	2–1	Leganés	Huesca
20:45 CEST (UTC+02:00)	Mantovani 55', 83'	Report	Omeruo (yellow card) 17'; Mantovani 39' (o.g.)	Stadium: El Alcoraz; Attendance: 5,575; Referee: Javier Alberola Rojas

=== Copa del Rey ===
==== Round of 32 ====
30 October 2018 First leg	Leganés	2–2	Rayo Vallecano	Leganés
20:30 CET (UTC+01:00)	En-Nesyri 31', 72'	Report	Medrán 15'; Alegría 21'; Ba (yellow card) 90+3'	Stadium: Butarque; Attendance: 5,872; Referee: Alberto Undiano Mallenco

4 December 2018 Second leg	Rayo Vallecano	0–1 (2–3 agg.)	Leganés	Madrid
20:30 CET (UTC+01:00)	Tito (yellow card) 21'; De Tomás (yellow card) 71'	Report	Velázquez 17' (o.g.); Tarín (yellow card) 35'; Gumbau (yellow card) 50'; Lunin (yellow card) 69'; Omeruo (yellow card) 81'	Stadium: Campo de Fútbol de Vallecas; Attendance: 8,372; Referee: Alejandro Hernández Hernández

==== Round of 16 ====
9 January 2019 First leg	Real Madrid	3–0	Leganés	Madrid
21:30 CET (UTC+01:00)	Ramos 44' (pen.); Nacho (yellow card) 55'; Vázquez 68'; Vinícius 77'; Valverde (yellow card) 84'	Report	Gumbau (yellow card) 42'; Pérez (yellow card) 90+2'	Stadium: Santiago Bernabéu; Attendance: 44,231; Referee: Jesús Gil Manzano

16 January 2019 Second leg	Leganés	1–0 (1–3 agg.)	Real Madrid	Leganés
21:30 CET (UTC+01:00)	Braithwaite 30'; Recio (yellow card) 73'	Report	Vinícius (yellow card) 82'; Ceballos (yellow card) 90+1'; Casemiro (yellow card) 90+1'	Stadium: Estadio Municipal de Butarque; Attendance: 9,437; Referee: Juan Martínez Munuera

== Statistics ==
=== Appearances and goals ===
Last updated on 18 May 2019

No.	Pos	Nat	Player	Total		La Liga		Copa del Rey	
No.	Pos	Nat	Player	Apps	Goals	Apps	Goals	Apps	Goals
Goalkeepers
1	GK	(Spain) ESP	Iván Cuéllar	36	0	34	0	2	0
29	GK	(Ukraine) UKR	Andriy Lunin	7	0	4+1	0	2	0
Defenders
2	DF	(Spain) ESP	Juanfran	26	1	17+6	1	3	0
3	DF	(Spain) ESP	Unai Bustinza	28	0	24+1	0	3	0
4	DF	(Mexico) MEX	Diego Reyes	6	0	4+2	0	0	0
5	DF	(Argentina) ARG	Jonathan Silva	33	3	30	3	1+2	0
12	DF	(Cameroon) CMR	Allan Nyom	25	1	20+3	1	1+1	0
14	DF	(Ukraine) UKR	Vasyl Kravets	7	0	6	0	1	0
15	DF	(Spain) ESP	Rodrigo Tarín	20	0	15+3	0	2	0
19	DF	(Argentina) ARG	Ezequiel Muñoz	3	0	2+1	0	0	0
22	DF	(Greece) GRE	Dimitris Siovas	37	1	34	1	3	0
24	DF	(Nigeria) NGR	Kenneth Omeruo	31	0	27+1	0	3	0
Midfielders
6	MF	(Spain) ESP	Gerard Gumbau	20	1	13+3	1	4	0
8	MF	(Spain) ESP	Recio	20	0	15+3	0	2	0
10	MF	(Morocco) MAR	Nabil El Zhar	30	4	9+18	4	3	0
11	MF	(Argentina) ARG	Alexander Szymanowski	1	0	0+1	0	0	0
16	MF	(Spain) ESP	José Arnaiz	8	0	0+6	0	0+2	0
17	MF	(Spain) ESP	Javier Eraso	17	0	9+4	0	3+1	0
21	MF	(Spain) ESP	Rubén Pérez	32	0	27+4	0	1	0
23	MF	(Spain) ESP	Mikel Vesga	28	1	23+3	1	1+1	0
27	MF	(Spain) ESP	Óscar	32	4	29+2	4	0+1	0
33	MF	(Spain) ESP	Javier Avilés	1	0	0	0	0+1	0
Forwards
9	FW	(Argentina) ARG	Guido Carrillo	33	6	23+9	6	0+1	0
18	FW	(Spain) ESP	Sabin Merino	15	0	2+10	0	3	0
20	FW	(Uruguay) URU	Michael Santos	16	1	5+11	1	0	0
25	FW	(Denmark) DEN	Martin Braithwaite	21	5	16+3	4	2	1
26	FW	(Morocco) MAR	Youssef En-Nesyri	34	11	22+9	9	1+2	2
Players who have made an appearance or had a squad number this season but have been loaned out or transferred
4	FW	(Uruguay) URU	Diego Rolán	8	0	2+4	0	2	0
7	FW	(Spain) ESP	Dani Ojeda	5	0	2+3	0	0	0
8	MF	(Brazil) BRA	Gabriel	0	0	0	0	0	0
13	GK	(Spain) ESP	Jon Ander Serantes	0	0	0	0	0	0
14	DF	(Spain) ESP	Raúl García	6	0	4+1	0	1	0
15	DF	(Argentina) ARG	Mauro dos Santos	0	0	0	0	0	0

=== Goalscorers ===
5 goals
