= Javier Rubio =

Javier Rubio may refer to:

- Javi Rubio (footballer, born 1984), Spanish football midfielder
- Javi Rubio (footballer, born 1999), Spanish football right-back
