= Kenneth Omeruo =

Nigerian footballer (born 1993)

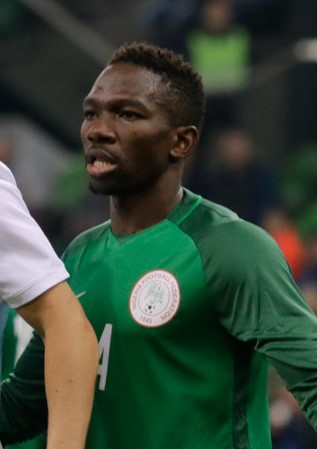
- Omeruo with Nigeria in 2017

Personal information
- Full name: Kenneth Josiah Omeruo
- Date of birth: 17 October 1993 (age 33)
- Place of birth: Obuohia Okike, Nigeria
- Height: 1.85 m (6 ft 1 in)
- Position: Defender

Youth career
- 2009-2011: JUTH
- 2011–2012: Standard Liège

Senior career*
Years	Team	Apps	(Gls)
2012–2019	Chelsea	0	(0)
2012–2013	→ ADO Den Haag (loan)	36	(2)
2014	→ Middlesbrough (loan)	14	(0)
2014–2015	→ Middlesbrough (loan)	19	(0)
2015–2016	→ Kasımpaşa (loan)	25	(0)
2016–2017	→ Alanyaspor (loan)	26	(1)
2017–2018	→ Kasımpaşa (loan)	28	(1)
2018–2019	→ Leganés (loan)	28	(0)
2019–2023	Leganés	86	(5)
2023–2025	Kasımpaşa	29	(1)
2025	CFR Cluj	0	(0)

International career^{‡}
2009	Nigeria U17	7	(1)
2011	Nigeria U20	6	(0)
2013–2024	Nigeria	69	(1)
Medal record
Representing Nigeria
Africa Cup of Nations
Winner	2013 South Africa
Second place	2023 Ivory Coast
Third place	2019 Egypt
FIFA U-17 World Cup
Winner	2009 Nigeria
- * Club domestic league appearances and goals as of 2 July 2025 ‡ National team caps and goals as of 26 March 2024

Kenneth Josiah Omeruo OON MON (born 17 October 1993) is a Nigerian professional footballer who plays as a defender.

Omeruo signed for Chelsea from Standard Liège in January 2012 and upon signing went on loan to Dutch top-flight side ADO Den Haag. Then only 19, he impressed enough in the Eredivisie to earn a call up to the Nigerian national team.

Now a regular international, Omeruo has represented Nigeria at the 2013 Africa Cup of Nations and the 2013 Confederations Cup in Brazil. Omeruo cemented a place in the starting line-up at the Africa Cup of Nations as the Super Eagles emerged victorious in the tournament. In 2019 he scored his first goal in the Africa Cup of Nations against Guinea. He was a key part of the Super Eagles team that won the bronze medal in 2019.

== Club career ==
=== Early career ===
Omeruo had spells at Sunshine Stars and Anderlecht as a trialist before he was signed from the Anderlecht academy by Standard Liège.

=== Chelsea ===
In January 2012, Chelsea signed Omeruo from Liège and immediately loaned him out to Eredivisie club ADO Den Haag. In May 2014 Nigeria World Cup-bound Omeruo agreed a new three-year contract with Chelsea.

==== Loan to ADO Den Haag ====
Omeruo joined ADO Den Haag on an 18-month loan deal which kept him at the club until the end of the 2012–13 season. On 3 March 2012, Omeruo made his debut for ADO Den Haag against Heerenveen, which ended in a 0–0 draw. On 19 April 2012, in a game against Groningen, Omeruo scored his first goal for ADO Den Haag.

On 28 April 2012, Omeruo scored against VVV in the 19th minute. He is the only player in the Dutch league ever to score a goal, an own goal and receive a red card in one match.

==== Loan to Middlesbrough ====
On 7 January 2014, Omeruo joined Middlesbrough on loan until the end of the 2013–14 season. On 1 February 2014, Omeruo made his debut for Middlesbrough in a 0–0 draw against Doncaster Rovers. On 8 April 2014, Omeruo was sent off in the 82nd minute after picking up a second yellow. Although Boro had to finish the game with nine men (Ben Gibson was also sent off late in the game), they still managed to earn a 3–1 win victory against Birmingham City.

He rejoined Middlesbrough for the 2014–15 season, making his first appearance against Birmingham in a 2-0 win.

==== Loan to Kasımpaşa ====
On 21 July 2015, Omeruo joined Kasımpaşa on a season-long loan with an option to purchase the player at the end of the spell. On 16 August 2015, Omeruo made his debut for Kasımpaşa in a match against Gaziantepspor, the match ended in a 3–0 victory for Kasımpaşa. Five days later, Omeruo made his home debut against İstanbul Başakşehir, which ended in a 1–0 victory for Kasımpaşa.

Omeruo had an up and down season, suffering from a couple injuries, however started whenever he was fit. Although the loan deal had an option to buy, Kasımpaşa decided to pass on the option due to a lack of funds, which led to Omeruo returning to Chelsea for pre-season.

==== Loan to Alanyaspor ====
On 31 August 2016, Omeruo signed a one-year contract extension until 2019, before leaving on loan again. He joined Alanyaspor on a season-long loan. He was given the number 44. On 10 September 2016, Omeruo made his debut in a 0–0 draw against Gençlerbirliği. On 25 February 2017, Omeruo scored his first goal for Alanyaspor in their 4–1 home victory over Adanaspor, netting in the hosts' second in the 37th minute.

In May 2017, Omeruo said he might have to leave Chelsea in order to play regular first-team football.

==== Return to Kasımpaşa ====
On 25 August 2017, after signing a new three-year deal at Chelsea, Omeruo returned to Kasımpaşa on a season-long loan.

=== Leganés ===
On 15 August 2018, Omeruo joined Leganés on a season-long loan. In October 2018, he stated that he was enjoying playing in Spain, and in March 2019, he said he wanted to sign for Leganés permanently.

On 13 August 2019, Omeruo returned to Leganés, this time on a permanent deal, ending his seven year spell at Chelsea.

=== Third spell at Kasımpaşa ===
On 27 July 2023, Leganés announced the transfer of Omeruo to Kasımpaşa.

== International career ==
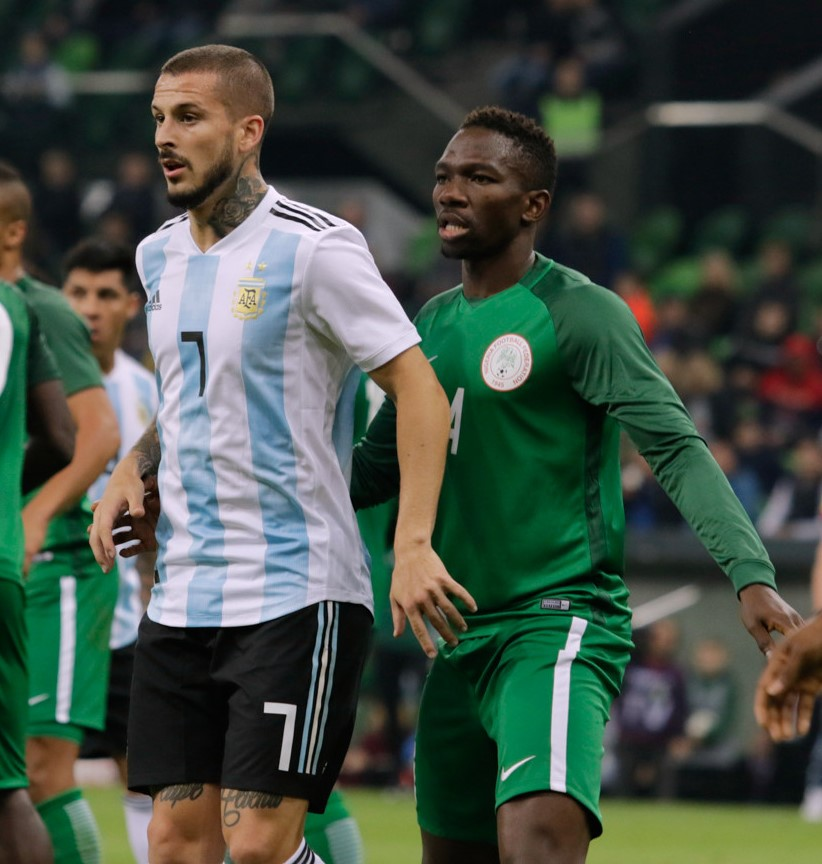
Omeruo with Nigeria against Argentina in a friendly match in 2017

Omeruo played for the Nigerian Under-20 team that reached the quarter-finals at the 2011 FIFA U-20 World Cup in Colombia.

On 9 January 2013, at the age of 19 he played for the senior team for the first time in a goalless draw against Cape Verde. He then went on to play in all of Nigeria's matches at the 2013 Africa Cup of Nations as Nigeria went on to win the competition for the third time.

Later that year he was selected for Nigeria's squad at the 2013 FIFA Confederations Cup and played in all of the three group games as Nigeria finished third in their group.

Omeuro was named in Nigeria's final squad for the 2014 FIFA World Cup and started in all four games, as Nigeria finished second in their group and were eliminated by France at the Round of 16.

He was selected by Nigeria for their 35-man provisional squad for the 2016 Summer Olympics, but did not make the final 18- man squad.

In May 2018, he was named in Nigeria's preliminary 30 man squad for the 2018 FIFA World Cup in Russia.

== Playing style ==
Omeruo has been described as a "tall, rangy but strong centre-back" and a "level-headed and determined youngster".

== Personal life ==
His younger brother Lucky Omeruo is also a footballer, who currently plays for Leganés B as a striker and for the Nigeria national under-20 football team.

Omeruo and his wife Chioma have welcomed their first child in London, a girl named Chairein.

== Career statistics ==
=== Club ===
As of 28 September 2024

Appearances and goals by club, season and competition
Club	Season	League			National cup (Note: Includes KNVB Cup, FA Cup, Turkish Cup, Copa del Rey)		League cup (Note: Includes EFL Cup)		Europe		Other		Total	
Club	Season	Division	Apps	Goals	Apps	Goals	Apps	Goals	Apps	Goals	Apps	Goals	Apps	Goals
ADO Den Haag (loan)	2011–12	Eredivisie	9	0	—		—		—		—		9	0
ADO Den Haag (loan)	2012–13	Eredivisie	27	2	2	0	—		—		—		29	2
ADO Den Haag (loan)	Total		36	2	2	0	—		—		—		38	2
Middlesbrough (loan)	2013–14	Championship	14	0	—		—		—		—		14	0
Middlesbrough (loan)	2014–15	Championship	19	0	2	0	1	0	—		—		22	0
Middlesbrough (loan)	Total		33	0	2	0	1	0	—		—		36	0
Kasımpaşa (loan)	2015–16	Süper Lig	25	0	1	0	—		—		—		26	0
Alanyaspor (loan)	2016–17	Süper Lig	26	1	—		—		—		—		26	1
Kasımpaşa (loan)	2017–18	Süper Lig	28	1	0	0	—		—		—		28	1
Leganés (loan)	2018–19	La Liga	28	0	3	0	—		—		—		31	0
Leganés	2019–20	La Liga	23	1	0	0	—		—		—		23	1
Leganés	2020–21	Segunda División	24	1	3	0	—		—		1 (Note: Appearance in Segunda División promotion play-offs)	0	28	1
Leganés	2021–22	Segunda División	17	2	2	0	—		—		—		19	2
Leganés	2022–23	Segunda División	22	1	0	0	—		—		—		22	1
Leganés	Total		114	5	8	0	—		—		1	0	123	5
Kasımpaşa	2023–24	Süper Lig	24	1	2	0	—		—		—		26	1
Kasımpaşa	2024–25	Süper Lig	5	0	—		—		—		—		5	0
Kasımpaşa	Total		29	1	2	0	—		—		—		31	1
CFR Cluj	2025–26	Liga I	0	0	0	0	—		0	0	0	0	0	0
Career total			291	10	15	0	1	0	0	0	1	0	308	10

=== International ===
As of match played 26 March 2024

Appearances and goals by national team and year
National team	Year	Apps	Goals
Nigeria	2013	15	0
Nigeria	2014	11	0
Nigeria	2015	5	0
Nigeria	2016	3	0
Nigeria	2017	2	0
Nigeria	2018	7	0
Nigeria	2019	9	1
Nigeria	2020	1	0
Nigeria	2021	2	0
Nigeria	2022	4	0
Nigeria	2023	3	0
Nigeria	2024	7	0
Total		69	1

Scores and results list Nigeria's goal tally first, score column indicates score after each Omeruo goal.

List of international goals scored by Kenneth Omeruo
No.	Date	Venue	Opponent	Score	Result	Competition
1	26 June 2019	Alexandria Stadium, Alexandria, Egypt	Guinea	1–0	1–0	2019 Africa Cup of Nations

== Honours ==
CFR Cluj

- Supercupa României runner-up: 2025

Nigeria U17

- FIFA U-17 World Cup runner-up: 2009

Nigeria

- Africa Cup of Nations: 2013; runner-up: 2023; third place: 2019

Orders

- Officer of the Order of the Niger
- Member of the Order of the Niger
