= Rubén Pardo (footballer) =

Spanish footballer

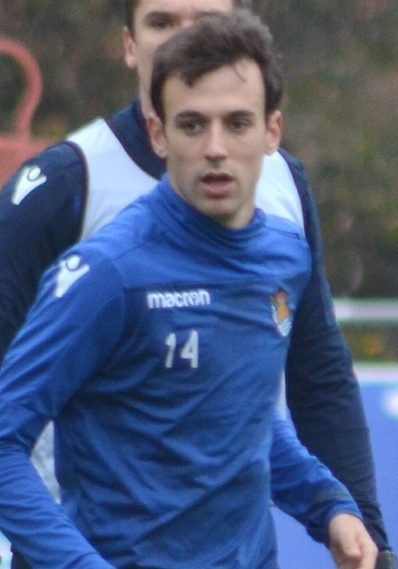
- Pardo with Real Sociedad in 2018

Personal information
- Full name: Rubén Pardo Gutiérrez
- Date of birth: 22 October 1992 (age 34)
- Place of birth: Logroño, Spain
- Height: 1.81 m (5 ft 11 in)
- Position: Midfielder

Youth career
- Real Sociedad

Senior career*
Years	Team	Apps	(Gls)
2010–2012	Real Sociedad B	37	(1)
2011–2020	Real Sociedad	164	(6)
2017	→ Betis (loan)	16	(1)
2020–2021	Bordeaux	9	(1)
2020–2021	→ Leganés (loan)	36	(4)
2021–2023	Leganés	66	(2)
2023–2025	Aris	24	(1)

International career
2009	Spain U17	9	(0)
2010	Spain U18	2	(0)
2010–2011	Spain U19	13	(0)
2013–2014	Spain U21	7	(0)
- * Club domestic league appearances and goals as of 23:05, 31 May 2025 (UTC)

Rubén Pardo Gutiérrez (born 22 October 1992) is a Spanish professional footballer who plays as a central midfielder.

He spent the vast majority of his career at Real Sociedad, making 194 official appearances and also being loaned to Betis. In January 2020, he signed with Bordeaux.

Pardo earned 31 caps for Spain at youth level, winning the 2011 European Under-19 championship.

== Club career ==
=== Real Sociedad ===
Pardo was born in Logroño, La Rioja. He made his senior debut in the 2009–10 season, appearing for Real Sociedad's reserves in the Tercera División and helping them to achieve promotion.

On 29 October 2011, Pardo made his debut for the first team, coming on as a substitute for Markel Bergara in the last minutes of a 0–1 La Liga home defeat against Real Madrid. He scored his first goal for the Txuriurdin on 13 February of the following year in a 2–0 victory over Sevilla FC also at Anoeta Stadium, and finished the campaign with 17 appearances in all competitions.

In 2013–14, Pardo missed only three games and contributed three goals, including one to conclude the 2–0 home defeat of Athletic Bilbao in the Basque derby on 5 January 2014. His form led to speculation of a transfer to Manchester United, which he played down; on 9 May, he renewed his contract with Real Sociedad until 2018.

Pardo was loaned to fellow top-division club Real Betis in January 2017, for the remainder of the season. He made his debut on the 29th, starting in a 1–1 home draw against reigning champions FC Barcelona.

=== Bordeaux ===
On 31 January 2020, Pardo signed a two-and-a-half-year deal with FC Girondins de Bordeaux. His maiden appearance in the French Ligue 1 took place on 5 February, when he featured 30 minutes in the 1–1 away draw with Stade Brestois 29 after replacing Jimmy Briand. He scored for the first time for his new team 18 days later, coming off the bench at the interval and netting the last goal of a 4–3 loss at leaders Paris Saint-Germain FC.

=== Leganés ===
Pardo returned to Spain on 28 September 2020, after agreeing to a one-year loan at CD Leganés in the second division. The following 28 August, he joined the club on a permanent two-year contract.

During his tenure at the Estadio Municipal de Butarque, Pardo totalled 107 matches and six goals.

=== Aris ===
On 29 August 2023, Pardo joined Aris Thessaloniki F.C. of the Super League Greece.

== International career ==
Pardo was part of Spain's squad in the 2009 UEFA European Under-17 Football Championship, although he only played in one game, as a substitute against France. He was selected by the under-18 team for the unofficial 2010 Copa del Atlántico, which his country won.

Pardo featured in every match at the 2011 European Under-19 Championship, helping the national side conquer the tournament in Romania.

== Career statistics ==
As of match played 10 May 2025

Appearances and goals by club, season and competition
Club	Season	League			National cup (Note: Includes Copa del Rey)		Europe		Total	
Club	Season	Division	Apps	Goals	Apps	Goals	Apps	Goals	Apps	Goals
Real Sociedad	2011–12	La Liga	15	1	2	0	—		17	1
Real Sociedad	2012–13	La Liga	25	0	2	0	—		27	0
Real Sociedad	2013–14	La Liga	35	3	3	0	6 (Note: Appearances in UEFA Champions League)	0	44	3
Real Sociedad	2014–15	La Liga	28	1	4	0	4 (Note: Appearances in UEFA Europa League)	0	36	1
Real Sociedad	2015–16	La Liga	28	0	2	0	—		30	0
Real Sociedad	2016–17	La Liga	3	0	1	0	—		4	0
Real Sociedad	2017–18	La Liga	6	0	2	0	2	0	10	0
Real Sociedad	2018–19	La Liga	24	1	1	0	—		25	1
Real Sociedad	2019–20	La Liga	0	0	1	1	—		1	1
Real Sociedad	Total		164	6	18	1	12	0	194	7
Betis (loan)	2016–17	La Liga	16	1	—		—		16	1
Bordeaux	2019–20	Ligue 1	6	1	—		—		6	1
Bordeaux	2020–21	Ligue 1	2	0	0	0	—		2	0
Bordeaux	2021–22	Ligue 1	1	0	0	0	—		1	0
Bordeaux	Total		9	1	0	0	—		9	1
Leganés (loan)	2020–21	Segunda División	36	4	2	0	—		38	4
Leganés	2021–22	Segunda División	32	1	2	0	—		34	1
Leganés	2022–23	Segunda División	34	1	1	0	—		35	1
Leganés	Total		102	6	5	0	—		107	6
Aris	2023–24	Super League Greece	15	1	0	0	—		15	1
Aris	2024–25	Super League Greece	9	0	0	0	—		9	0
Aris	Total		24	1	0	0	—		24	1
Career total			315	15	23	1	12	0	350	16

== Honours ==
Spain U19

- UEFA European Under-19 Championship: 2011
