= Sergio González (footballer, born 1992) =

Spanish footballer

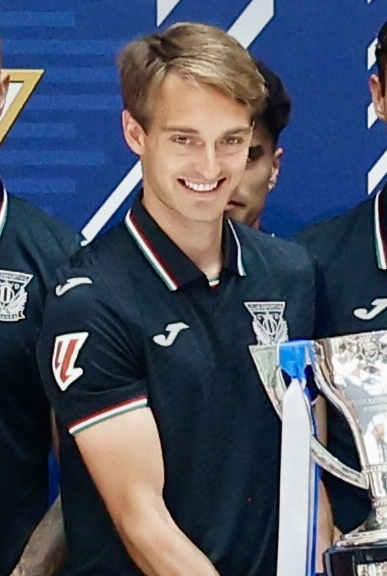
- González with Leganés in 2024

Personal information
- Full name: Sergio González Poirrier
- Date of birth: 20 April 1992 (age 34)
- Place of birth: Madrid, Spain
- Height: 1.89 m (6 ft 2 in)
- Position: Centre-back

Team information
- Current team: Nea Salamina
- Number: 55

Youth career
- 2004–2006: Atlético Madrid
- 2006–2007: Las Rozas
- 2007–2008: Getafe
- 2008–2011: Real Madrid

Senior career*
Years	Team	Apps	(Gls)
2011–2012	Las Rozas	31	(9)
2012–2013	Villaviciosa	33	(0)
2013–2015	Alcorcón B	65	(2)
2015–2017	SS Reyes	66	(2)
2017–2018	Recreativo	33	(0)
2018–2020	Mirandés	60	(3)
2020–2025	Leganés	155	(11)
2025–2026	Al-Riyadh	19	(1)
2026–	Nea Salamina	8	(1)
- * Club domestic league appearances and goals as of 7 November 2026

Sergio González Poirrier (born 20 April 1992) is a Spanish professional footballer who plays as a centre-back or defensive midfielder for Nea Salamina.

== Career ==
=== Early career ===
Born in Madrid, González joined Real Madrid's La Fábrica in 2008, from Getafe CF. In 2011, after finishing his formation, he joined Preferente side Las Rozas CF, and made his debut during the season.

González moved to AD Villaviciosa de Odón in Tercera División in July 2012, being a regular starter during the campaign as his side suffered relegation. In July of the following year, he agreed to a contract with AD Alcorcón, being assigned to the reserves in the same division.

In 2015, González signed for UD San Sebastián de los Reyes, still in the fourth tier; he achieved promotion to Segunda División B in his first season, being a first-choice option, and captained the side in his second. On 15 July 2017, he agreed to a one-year contract with Recreativo de Huelva in division three.

=== Mirandés ===
On 23 July 2018, free agent González joined fellow third tier club CD Mirandés on a one-year deal. The following 5 July, after achieving promotion to Segunda División, he renewed his contract for a further year.

On 17 August 2019, aged 27, González made his professional debut by starting in a 2–2 away draw against Rayo Vallecano. He scored his first goal in the second division on 24 November, netting his team's second in a 2–1 away defeat of Albacete Balompié.

=== Leganés ===
On 10 August 2020, González agreed to a three-year contract with CD Leganés, freshly relegated to the second tier. He was a regular starter for the side during the 2023–24 season, scoring a career-best six goals as the club achieved promotion to La Liga.

González made his top tier debut on 17 August 2024, starting in a 1–1 away draw against CA Osasuna. He scored his first goal in the category on 27 October, netting his side's third in a 3–0 home win over RC Celta de Vigo.

On 29 May 2025, after suffering team relegation, González left Lega.

== Career statistics ==
As of match played 24 May 2025

Appearances and goals by club, season and competition
Club	Season	League			Cup		Europe		Other		Total	
Club	Season	Division	Apps	Goals	Apps	Goals	Apps	Goals	Apps	Goals	Apps	Goals
Las Rozas	2011–12	Preferente de Madrid	31	9	0	0	—		—		32	9
Villaviciosa	2011–12	Tercera División	33	0	0	0	—		—		33	0
Alcorcón B	2013–14	Tercera División	38	2	—		—		—		38	2
Alcorcón B	2014–15	Tercera División	27	0	—		—		—		27	0
Alcorcón B	Total		65	2	—		—		—		65	2
SS Reyes	2015–16	Segunda División B	30	2	0	0	—		2 (Note: Appearances in play-offs)	0	32	2
SS Reyes	2016–17	Segunda División B	36	0	1	0	—		—		37	0
SS Reyes	Total		66	2	1	0	—		—		67	2
Recreativo	2017–18	Segunda División B	33	0	0	0	—		—		33	0
Mirandés	2018–19	Segunda División B	37	2	0	0	—		—		37	2
Mirandés	2019–20	Segunda División	28	1	5	1	—		—		33	2
Mirandés	Total		65	3	5	1	—		—		70	4
Leganés	2021–22	Segunda División	21	1	3	1	—		—		24	2
Leganés	2021–22	Segunda División	24	1	1	0	—		2 (Note: Appearances in promotion play-offs)	0	27	1
Leganés	2022–23	Segunda División	33	1	0	0	—		—		33	1
Leganés	2023–24	Segunda División	41	6	1	0	—		—		42	6
Leganés	2024–25	La Liga	36	2	4	0	—		—		40	2
Leganés	Total		155	11	9	1	—		2	0	166	12
Career total			449	27	151	2	0	0	4	0	468	29

== Honours ==
SS Reyes

- Tercera División: 2015–16

Mirandés

- Copa Federación de España: 2018–19

Leganés

- Segunda División: 2023–24
