= Javi Hernández (footballer, born 1998) =

Spanish footballer

Personal information
- Full name: Javier Hernández Carrera
- Date of birth: 2 May 1998 (age 28)
- Place of birth: Jerez de la Frontera, Spain
- Height: 1.85 m (6 ft 1 in)
- Positions: Centre-back; left-back

Team information
- Current team: Cerezo Osaka (on loan from Leganés)

Youth career
- 2005–2008: Torrecera
- 2008–2009: La Granja
- 2009–2013: Sevilla
- 2013–2017: Real Madrid

Senior career*
Years	Team	Apps	(Gls)
2017–2020	Real Madrid B	24	(2)
2017–2018	→ El Ejido (loan)	33	(2)
2018	→ Oviedo B (loan)	5	(1)
2018–2019	→ Oviedo (loan)	25	(1)
2020–	Leganés	103	(8)
2022–2023	→ Girona (loan)	25	(1)
2023–2024	→ Cádiz (loan)	30	(1)
2025–2026	→ Al-Arabi (loan)	10	(0)
2026	→ Panathinaikos (loan)	9	(2)
2026–	→ Cerezo Osaka (loan)	0	(0)
- * Club domestic league appearances and goals as of 19 April 2026

Javier "Javi" Hernández Carrera (born 2 May 1998) is a Spanish professional footballer who plays as a centre-back or left-back for J1 League club Cerezo Osaka, on loan from Segunda División club Leganés.

== Career ==
Born in Jerez de la Frontera, Cádiz, Andalusia, Hernández joined Real Madrid's youth setup in 2013, from Sevilla. On 17 July 2017, after finishing his formation, he was loaned to Segunda División B side El Ejido, for one year.

Hernández made his senior debut on 27 August 2017, starting and scoring his team's first in a 3–3 home draw against Cartagena. He finished the campaign as an undisputed starter, contributing with two goals in 33 matches.

On 13 July 2018, Hernández was loaned to Oviedo B, also in the third division, until the end of the season. He made his first-team debut on 11 September, starting in a 1–0 away loss against Mallorca in the season's Copa del Rey.

Hernández scored his first professional goal on 7 January 2019, netting the opener in a 3–2 away win against Numancia in the Segunda División. Upon returning, he was assigned to Real Madrid's B-team in the third division.

On 28 September 2020, Hernández agreed to a four-year deal with Leganés in the second division. On 19 August 2022, he was loaned to La Liga side Girona for the season.

Hernández made his debut in the main category of Spanish football on 22 August 2022, playing the last 21 minutes in a 3–1 home win over Getafe. He scored his first goal in the division the following 17 February, netting his team's fourth in a 6–2 home routing of Almería.

On 5 July 2023, Hernández renewed his contract with Lega until 2026, and was loaned to Cádiz also in the top tier for one year. Upon returning after suffering relegation, he extended his contract until 2027 on 17 September 2024, was a regular starter as his side also dropped down a level.

On 5 August 2025, Hernández moved abroad for the first time in his career, after agreeing to a one-year loan deal with Al-Arabi of the Qatar Stars League. The following 2 February, he moved to Greek club Panathinaikos also in a temporary deal. On 28 August 2026, he was loaned to J1 League club Cerezo Osaka for one season with an option to buy.

== Career statistics ==
=== Club ===
As of 17 March 2026

Appearances and goals by club, season and competition
Club	Season	League			National cup (Note: Includes Copa del Rey, Emperor's Cup)		League Cup (Note: Includes Qatari Stars Cup)		Continental		Other		Total	
Club	Season	Division	Apps	Goals	Apps	Goals	Apps	Goals	Apps	Goals	Apps	Goals	Apps	Goals
Real Madrid B	2019–20	Segunda División B	24	2	0	0	—		—		—		24	2
El Ejido (loan)	2017–18	Segunda División B	33	2	0	0	—		—		—		33	2
Oviedo B (loan)	2018–19	Segunda División B	5	1	0	0	—		—		—		5	1
Oviedo (loan)	2018–19	Segunda División	25	1	1	0	—		—		—		26	1
Leganés	2020–21	Segunda División	33	3	1	0	—		—		2 (Note: Appearances in La Liga Promotion Playoffs)	0	36	3
Leganés	2021–22	Segunda División	39	3	2	0	—		—		—		41	3
Leganés	2024–25	Segunda División	31	2	4	1	—		—		—		35	3
Leganés	Total		103	8	7	1	—		—		2	0	112	9
Girona (loan)	2022–23	La Liga	25	1	1	0	—		—		—		26	1
Cádiz (loan)	2023–24	La Liga	30	1	0	0	—		—		—		30	1
Al-Arabi (loan)	2025–26	Qatar Stars League	10	1	0	0	3	0	—		—		13	1
Panathinaikos (loan)	2025–26	Super League Greece	6	2	0	0	—		2 (Note: Appearances in UEFA Europa League)	0	—		8	2
Cerezo Osaka (loan)	2026–27	J1 League	0	0	0	0	—		—		—		0	0
Career total			261	19	9	1	3	0	2	0	2	0	277	20

== Honours ==
Real Madrid

- La Liga: 2019–20

Real Madrid U19

- División de Honor Juvenil: 2016–17
- Copa del Rey Juvenil: 2017
