= José Arnaiz =

Spanish footballer (born 1995)

Personal information
- Full name: José Manuel Arnaiz Díaz
- Date of birth: 15 April 1995 (age 31)
- Place of birth: Talavera de la Reina, Spain
- Height: 1.75 m (5 ft 9 in)
- Position: Winger

Team information
- Current team: Granada
- Number: 11

Youth career
- 2010–2013: Talavera
- 2013–2014: Valladolid

Senior career*
Years	Team	Apps	(Gls)
2013	Talavera	7	(0)
2014–2016	Valladolid B	39	(13)
2015–2017	Valladolid	41	(12)
2017–2018	Barcelona B	21	(6)
2017–2018	Barcelona	1	(0)
2018–2023	Leganés	127	(22)
2020	→ Osasuna (loan)	14	(2)
2023–2025	Osasuna	41	(2)
2025–	Granada	35	(9)
- * Club domestic league appearances and goals as of 9 June 2026

José Manuel Arnaiz Díaz (born 15 April 1995) is a Spanish professional footballer who plays as a winger for Segunda División club Granada.

== Career ==
=== Valladolid ===
Arnaiz was born in Talavera de la Reina, Toledo, Castile-La Mancha. He made his senior debut with UD Talavera in 2013 in Tercera División at the age of 18 and, on 6 May 2013, moved to Real Valladolid in a return to youth football.

On 7 November 2015, after appearing regularly with the reserves, Arnaiz made his professional debut by coming on as a late substitute for Pedro Tiba in a 1–1 home draw against CD Leganés in the Segunda División. The following 8 June, after scoring 11 goals the previous season, he renewed his contract until 2019, and was definitely promoted to the first team.

Arnaiz scored his first professional goal on 21 August 2016, the only in a home victory over Real Oviedo. On 8 October, he scored a brace in a 2–0 home defeat of AD Alcorcón, and finished the campaign with 12 goals, being a key unit as his side failed to qualify for the play-offs.

=== Barcelona ===
On 25 August 2017, FC Barcelona reached an agreement with Valladolid for the transfer of Arnaiz. He signed a three-year contract with the club three days later, being initially assigned to their B side also in the second division.

Arnaiz made his first-team debut on 24 October 2017, starting the match and scoring the last goal in a 3–0 away win over Real Murcia CF in the round of 32 of the Copa del Rey. The following 3 January, he opened the 1–1 away draw against RC Celta de Vigo also in the national cup; he went on score three times during that competition, only needing as many shots to achieve the feat.

Arnaiz's maiden La Liga appearance took place on 7 January 2018, when he replaced Sergi Roberto late in a 3–0 home victory against Levante UD.

=== Leganés ===
On 13 August 2018, Arnaiz agreed to a five-year deal with CD Leganés. On 29 January 2020, he was loaned to fellow top-tier side CA Osasuna until June. On 11 July, he scored the winner as the hosts defeated Celta 2–1, and in another win by the same score he added another goal at Barcelona's Camp Nou five days later.

Arnaiz was his team's top scorer in 2022–23, his nine goals helping to a 14th-place finish in division two.

=== Osasuna ===
On 13 June 2023, as his link to Leganés was due to expire, Arnaiz returned to Osasuna on a two-year contract. He made his debut in European competition on 24 August, as a second-half substitute in the 1–2 home loss against Club Brugge KV in the play-off round of the UEFA Conference League.

=== Later career ===
In July 2025, the free agent Arnaiz signed a two-year deal with Granada CF.

== Career statistics ==
As of match played on 10 May 2021

Appearances and goals by club, season and competition
Club	Season	League			Copa del Rey		Champions League		Other		Total	
Club	Season	Division	Apps	Goals	Apps	Goals	Apps	Goals	Apps	Goals	Apps	Goals
Talavera	2012–13	Tercera División	7	0	—		—		—		7	0
Valladolid B	2014–15	Segunda División B	8	2	—		—		—		8	2
Valladolid B	2015–16	Segunda División B	31	11	—		—		—		31	11
Valladolid B	Total		39	13	—		—		—		39	13
Valladolid	2015–16	Segunda División	5	0	0	0	—		—		5	0
Valladolid	2016–17	Segunda División	35	12	1	0	—		—		36	12
Valladolid	2017–18	Segunda División	1	0	0	0	—		—		1	0
Valladolid	Total		41	12	1	0	—		—		42	12
Barcelona B	2017–18	Segunda División	21	6	—		—		—		21	6
Barcelona	2017–18	La Liga	1	0	4	3	0	0	—		5	3
Barcelona	Total		22	6	4	3	0	0	—		26	9
Leganés	2018–19	La Liga	6	0	2	0	—		—		8	0
Leganés	2019–20	La Liga	12	0	2	0	—		—		14	0
Leganés	2020–21	Segunda División	32	6	1	0	—		—		33	6
Leganés	Total		50	6	5	0	—		—		55	6
Osasuna (loan)	2019–20	La Liga	14	2	—		—		—		14	2
Career total			173	39	10	3	0	0	0	0	183	42

== Honours ==
Barcelona

- La Liga: 2017–18
- Copa del Rey: 2017–18
