= Sergi Palencia =

Spanish footballer (born 1996)

- Palencia with Los Angeles FC in 2026

Personal information
- Full name: Sergi Palencia Hurtado
- Date of birth: 23 March 1996 (age 30)
- Place of birth: Badalona, Spain
- Height: 1.68 m (5 ft 6 in)
- Position: Right-back

Team information
- Current team: Los Angeles FC
- Number: 14

Youth career
- 2004–2006: Badalona
- 2006–2015: Barcelona

Senior career*
Years	Team	Apps	(Gls)
2015–2019	Barcelona B	97	(2)
2018–2019	→ Bordeaux (loan)	25	(0)
2019–2023	Saint-Étienne	6	(0)
2020–2022	→ Leganés (loan)	71	(0)
2020	Saint-Étienne B	1	(0)
2023–	Los Angeles FC	83	(1)

International career
2018	Spain U21	2	(0)
- * Club domestic league appearances and goals as of 6 October 2025

Sergi Palencia Hurtado (born 23 March 1996) is a Spanish professional footballer who plays as a right-back for Major League Soccer club Los Angeles FC.

Formed at Barcelona, where he was only a reserve, he has played in Ligue 1 for Bordeaux and Saint-Étienne.

== Club career ==
=== Barcelona ===
Born in Badalona, Barcelona, Catalonia, Palencia started playing football for hometown club Badalona at the age of 8, moving to Barcelona's youth system, La Masia, in 2006. In 2013, he was compared to Bayern Munich full back Philipp Lahm by Spanish newspaper Mundo Deportivo.

On 29 March 2015, while still a youth player, Palencia was called up to the Barcelona reserve team for a Segunda División match against Tenerife, and played his first match as a professional hours later, starting in a 1–1 home draw. He and Álex Grimaldo were sent off on 25 April 2015 in a 2–1 win over Ponferradina at the Mini Estadi. Palencia played eleven matches in a season which saw his team relegated to Segunda División B, scoring his first goal on 31 May in a 5–2 home loss to Leganés.

On 10 August 2016, Palencia was named the B-team's captain. He achieved promotion back to the second level at the end of the campaign, and renewed his contract until 2020 on 5 October 2017.

On 16 August 2018, Palencia joined Ligue 1 side Bordeaux in a season-long loan deal. He played 31 total games, starting on 19 August in the season-opening 2–1 loss at rivals Toulouse in the Derby de la Garonne.

=== Saint-Étienne ===
On 5 July 2019, Palencia joined Saint-Étienne for a fee of €2 million, with an additional €1 million in variables. Barcelona maintained 20% of his future transfer fee. On his debut on 1 September, a 1–0 loss at Marseille, he sprained his right ankle under a challenge from Jordan Amavi and was ruled out for six weeks.

On 28 September 2020, Palencia returned to Spain and its second division after agreeing to a one-year loan deal with Leganés. The following July, after playoff defeat to nearby Rayo Vallecano, his loan was extended for another year; he was out of Saint-Étienne manager Claude Puel's plans and the French club needed to balance the books.

=== Los Angeles FC ===
On 2 February 2023, Palencia joined Major League Soccer club Los Angeles FC on a two-year deal with the option for a third, reuniting him with former Saint-Étienne teammate Denis Bouanga. He made his debut on 12 March, starting in a 4–0 home win over the New England Revolution.

On 25 February 2025 Palencia was accused of using discriminatory language by Colorado Rapids defender Chidozie Awaziem during the second leg of the 2025 Concacaf Champions Cup match between the teams. On 4 March 2025 Concacaf released a statement saying "Following a thorough review of the match officials’ reports, available match footage and audios, and the respective positions of both clubs, the Concacaf Disciplinary Committee has cleared Los Angeles FC player Sergi Palencia of any discriminatory action.", going on to say, "it is clear to the Committee that the word reported by the Colorado Rapids in its official position to Concacaf was not used.

== Career statistics ==
=== Club ===
As of match played 12 December 2023

Appearances and goals by club, season and competition
Club	Season	League			National Cup		League Cup		Continental		Other		Total	
Club	Season	Division	Apps	Goals	Apps	Goals	Apps	Goals	Apps	Goals	Apps	Goals	Apps	Goals
Barcelona B	2014–15	Segunda División	11	1	—		—		—		—		11	1
Barcelona B	2015–16	Segunda División B	20	0	—		—		—		—		20	0
Barcelona B	2016–17	Segunda División B	35	1	—		—		—		6 (Note: Six appearances in Segunda División B play-offs)	0	41	1
Barcelona B	2017–18	Segunda División	31	0	—		—		—		—		31	0
Barcelona B	Total		97	2	—		—		—		6	0	103	2
Bordeaux (loan)	2018–19	Ligue 1	25	0	1	0	1	0	4 (Note: All appearances in UEFA Europa League)	0	—		31	0
Saint-Étienne	2019–20	Ligue 1	6	0	1	0	1	0	1	0	—		9	0
Saint-Étienne	2022–23	Ligue 2	9	0	0	0	0	0	—		—		9	0
Saint-Étienne	Total		15	0	1	0	1	0	1	0	0	0	18	0
Saint-Étienne B	2020–21	Championnat National 3	1	0	—		—		—		—		1	0
Leganés (loan)	2020–21	Segunda División	36	0	1	0	—		—		2 (Note: Two appearances in Segunda División play-offs)	0	39	0
Leganés (loan)	2021–22	Segunda División	35	0	0	0	—		—		—		35	0
Leganés (loan)	Total		71	0	1	0	—		—		2	0	74	0
Los Angeles FC	2023	Major League Soccer	25	0	0	0	—		6 (Note: Appearances in CONCACAF Champions Cup)	0	4 (Note: Three appearances in Leagues Cup and one appearance in Campeones Cup)	0	35	0
Career total			234	2	3	0	2	0	11	0	12	0	218	2

== Honours ==
Barcelona U19

- UEFA Youth League: 2013–14

Saint-Étienne

- Coupe de France runner-up: 2019–20
