= Michael Santos (footballer) =

Uruguayan footballer (born 1993)

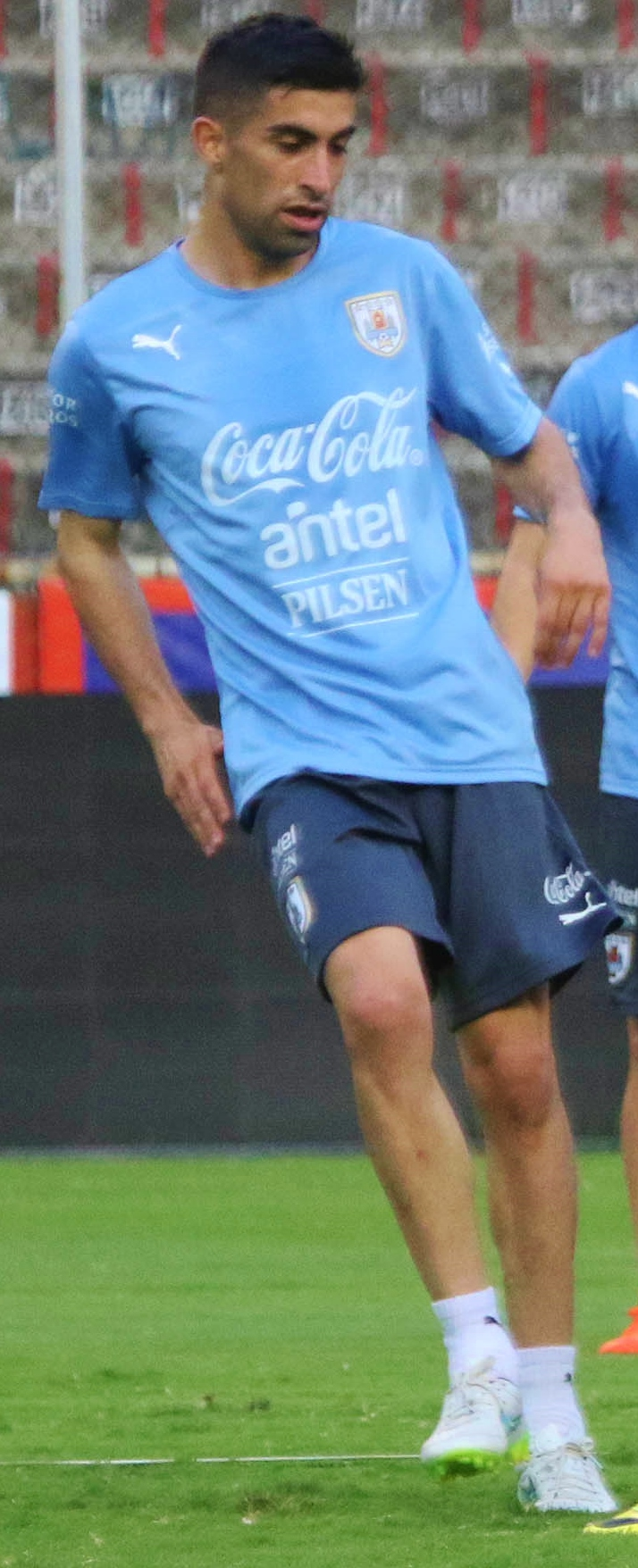
- Santos with Uruguay in 2015

Personal information
- Full name: Michael Nicolás Santos Rosadilla
- Date of birth: 13 March 1993 (age 33)
- Place of birth: Montevideo, Uruguay
- Height: 1.74 m (5 ft 9 in)
- Position: Forward

Team information
- Current team: Central Córdoba SdE (on loan from Vélez Sarsfield)
- Number: 27

Youth career
- 1998–2002: Wanderers de Pando
- 2002–2004: Nacional de Pando
- 2004–2006: San Luis de Pando
- 2006–2008: Montevideo Wanderers
- 2008–2011: River Plate Montevideo

Senior career*
Years	Team	Apps	(Gls)
2011–2016	River Plate Montevideo	91	(41)
2016–2019	Málaga	14	(3)
2017–2018	→ Sporting Gijón (loan)	36	(17)
2018–2019	→ Leganés (loan)	16	(1)
2019–2021	Copenhagen	23	(7)
2020–2021	→ Leganés (loan)	9	(0)
2021–2023	Talleres	82	(27)
2023–2024	FC Juárez	23	(3)
2024–	Vélez Sarsfield	30	(3)
2026–	→ Central Córdoba SdE (loan)	25	(9)

International career
2014–2015	Uruguay U22	5	(1)
2015	Uruguay	2	(0)
Medal record
Representing Uruguay
Men's Football
Pan American Games
Gold medal – first place	2015 Toronto	Team competition
- * Club domestic league appearances and goals as of 17:26, 12 November 2026 (UTC)

Michael Nicolás Santos Rosadilla (born 13 March 1993) is a Uruguayan footballer who plays as a forward for Argentine club Central Córdoba SdE, on loan from Vélez Sarsfield.

== Club career ==
=== River Plate ===
Born in Montevideo, Santos was a River Plate Montevideo youth graduate. He made his first team – and Primera División – debut on 13 February 2011, coming on as a second-half substitute for Federico Puppo in a 1–2 home loss against Rampla Juniors.

On 28 April 2012, Santos scored his first professional goal, netting the winner in a 2–1 home win against Fénix. Exactly one month later, he was sent off for two bookable offenses in a 2–4 loss at Racing Montevideo.

Santos scored a career-best 21 goals during the 2014–15 season, with braces against Fénix, Sud América (two times), and Juventud Las Piedras, aside from a hat-trick against El Tanque Sisley. He also scored River's first ever goal in the Copa Libertadores, through a penalty in a 2–0 home win against Universidad de Chile.

=== Málaga ===
On 5 July 2016, Santos signed a four-year deal with La Liga club Málaga CF. He made his debut for the club on 23 October, replacing Jony in a 4–0 home routing of CD Leganés.

Santos scored his first goal in the Spanish top tier on 4 November 2016, netting the winner in a 3–2 home win against Sporting de Gijón.

==== Sporting Gijón (loan) ====
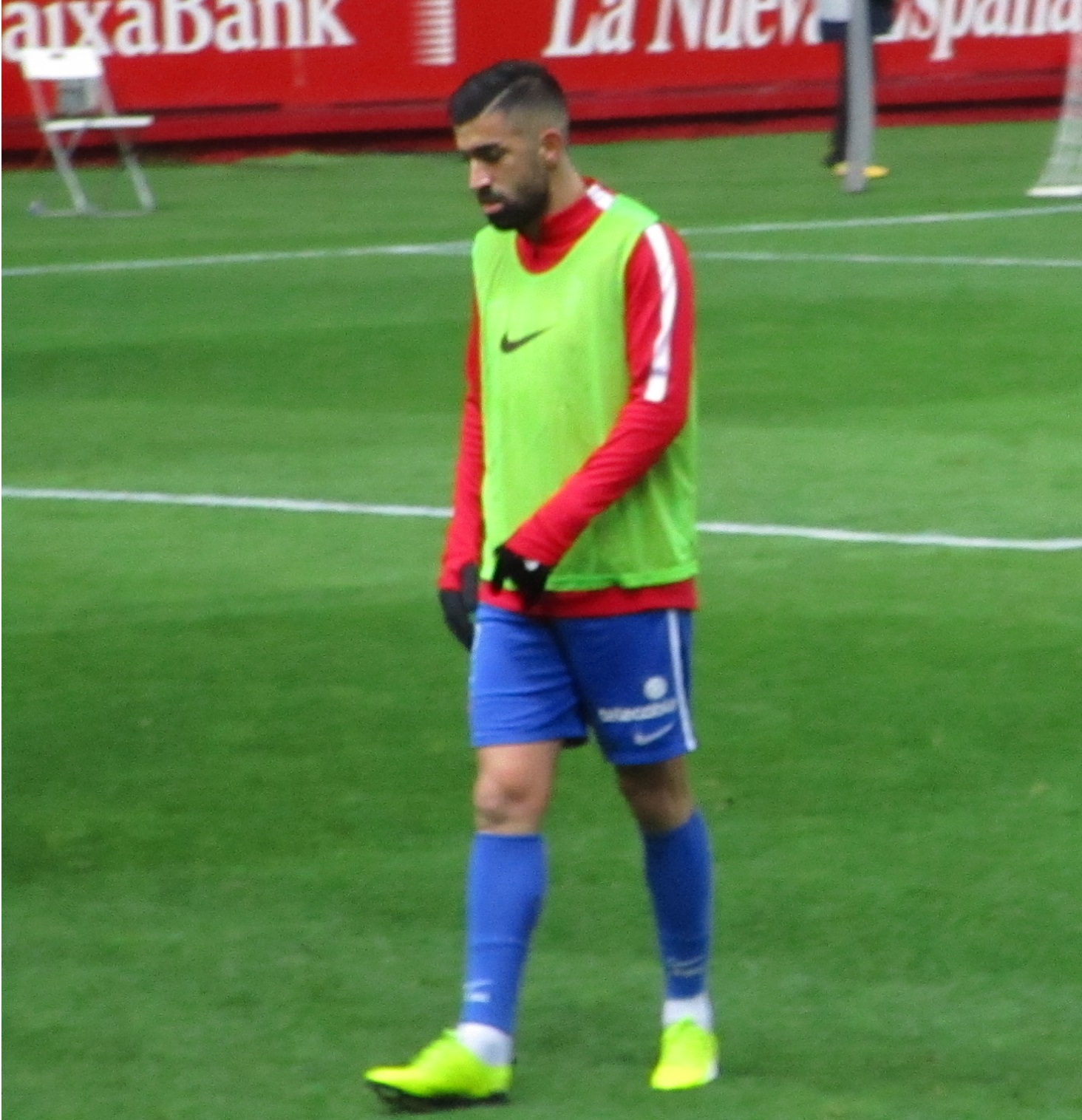
Santos warming up before a match with Sporting Gijón in 2017

On 14 August 2017, Santos was loaned to Sporting, now in Segunda División, for one year. He scored 17 goals during the campaign, being the club's top goalscorer and the fifth overall in the category.

==== Leganés (loan) ====
On 1 August 2018, Santos was loaned to CD Leganés in the top flight, for one year.

=== FC Copenhagen ===
On 21 August 2019, Santos was signed by Danish club F.C. Copenhagen for a reported transfer fee of 2.25 million euro.

==== Return to Leganés (loan) ====
Santos returned to Lega on 14 September 2020, also in a temporary deal, with the club now in the second division.

==== Back to Copenhagen ====
In January 2021 it was reported, that Santos had returned to Copenhagen because he couldn't extend his work permit in Spain. On 31 January 2021 Copenhagen confirmed, that Santos' contract had been terminated by mutual consent.

=== Talleres ===
On 6 February 2021, Santos signed a three-year contract with Argentine Primera División side Talleres.

== International career ==
On 17 June 2015, Santos was included in Uruguay under-23s' 18-man list for the year's Pan American Games. He appeared in five matches during the tournament, scoring one goal against Brazil, as his side was crowned champions.

On 29 August 2015, Santos was called up to the senior squad by manager Óscar Tabárez as a replacement to injured Abel Hernández. He made his full international debut on 8 September, replacing Jonathan Rodríguez against Costa Rica.

== Career statistics ==
As of match played 16 December 2019

Appearances and goals by club, season and competition
Club	Season	League			Cup		Continental		Other		Total	
Club	Season	Division	Apps	Goals	Apps	Goals	Apps	Goals	Apps	Goals	Apps	Goals
Málaga	2016–17	La Liga	14	3	2	1	0	0	0	0	16	4
Sporting de Gijón (loan)	2017–18	Segunda División	38	17	1	0	0	0	0	0	39	17
Leganés (loan)	2018–19	La Liga	16	1	0	0	0	0	0	0	16	1
Copenhagen	2019–20	Danish Superliga	18	7	2	0	11	2	0	0	31	9
Career total			82	26	4	1	8	1	0	0	95	28

== Honours ==
=== Club ===
River Plate

- Torneo Preparación: 2012
- Copa Integración: 2012

Vélez Sarsfield

- Argentine Primera División: 2024

Uruguay U23

- Pan American Games: 2015

=== Individual ===
- Argentine Primera División Top scorer: 2023 (shared with Pablo Vegetti)
- Argentine Primera División Team of the Season: 2023
