= UD Talavera =

Football club in Spain

Talavera
- Full name: Unión Deportiva Talavera
- Founded: 1993
- Dissolved: 2014
- Ground: El Prado, Talavera de la Reina, Castilla-La Mancha, Spain
- Capacity: 2,000
- Chairman: (Spain) Pedro Rosado
- Manager: (Spain) Javier Rosado
- 2013–14: Primera Autonómica Preferente – Group 2, retired
Home colours	Away colours

Unión Deportiva Talavera was a Spanish football team based in Talavera de la Reina in the autonomous community of Castilla-La Mancha. Founded in 1993 and dissolved in 2014, it last played in the Primera Autonómica Preferente – Group 2. Its stadium is El Prado with a capacity of 2,000 seats.

== Season to season ==
Season	Tier	Division	Place	Copa del Rey
1993–94	6	1ª Reg.	17th	
1994–95	6	1ª Reg.	6th	
1995–96	6	2ª Aut.	6th	
1996–97	6	2ª Aut.	1st	
1997–98	5	1ª Aut.	2nd	
1998–99	4	3ª	19th	
1999–2000	5	1ª Aut.	1st	
2000–01	4	3ª	11th	
2001–02	4	3ª	20th	
2002–03	5	1ª Aut.	7th	
2003–04	5	1ª Aut.	1st	

Season	Tier	Division	Place	Copa del Rey
2004–05	4	3ª	4th	
2005–06	4	3ª	12th	
2006–07	4	3ª	20th	
2007–08	5	Aut. Pref.	10th	
2008–09	5	Aut. Pref.	8th	
2009–10	5	Aut. Pref.	2nd	
2010–11	5	Aut. Pref.	1st	
2011–12	4	3ª	14th	
2012–13	4	3ª	20th	
2013–14	5	Aut. Pref.	(R)	

- 8 seasons in Tercera División
