= Rubén Pérez (footballer, born 1989) =

Spanish footballer

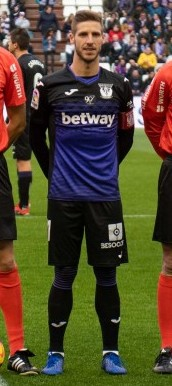
- Pérez with Leganés in 2018

Personal information
- Full name: Rubén Salvador Pérez del Mármol
- Date of birth: 26 April 1989 (age 37)
- Place of birth: Écija, Spain
- Height: 1.78 m (5 ft 10 in)
- Position: Defensive midfielder

Youth career
- 2002–2008: Atlético Madrid

Senior career*
Years	Team	Apps	(Gls)
2008–2010	Atlético Madrid B	53	(1)
2010–2015	Atlético Madrid	1	(0)
2010–2011	→ Deportivo La Coruña (loan)	32	(0)
2011–2012	→ Getafe (loan)	9	(0)
2012–2013	→ Betis (loan)	25	(1)
2013–2014	→ Elche (loan)	31	(0)
2014–2015	→ Torino (loan)	6	(0)
2015	→ Granada (loan)	14	(0)
2015–2018	Granada	31	(0)
2016–2018	→ Leganés (loan)	61	(0)
2018–2021	Leganés	94	(1)
2021–2025	Panathinaikos	89	(0)
2025–2026	A.E. Kifisia	24	(0)
Total		470	(3)

International career
2010–2011	Spain U21	5	(0)
- * Club domestic league appearances and goals

Rubén Salvador Pérez del Mármol (born 26 April 1989) is a Spanish former professional footballer who played as a defensive midfielder.

== Club career ==
=== Atlético Madrid ===
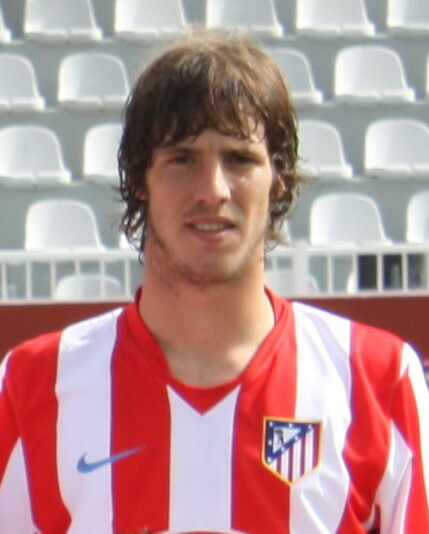
Pérez with Atlético Madrid B in 2009

Pérez was born in Écija, Andalusia. Having arrived at Atlético Madrid's youth system at age 13, he made his debut for the first team on 15 May 2010 in a 0–3 home loss against Getafe CF, replacing another youth product, the injured Borja.

On 25 July 2010, as part of the transfer of Filipe Luís to the Colchoneros, Pérez was loaned to fellow La Liga club Deportivo de La Coruña for two seasons, He made his debut for the Galicians on 12 September, playing 80 minutes in the 0–0 draw at Sevilla FC.

In August 2011, after Depor's relegation, Pérez returned to the top division and joined Getafe, with Borja Fernández heading in the opposite direction. He featured in only ten games for the Madrid side during the entire campaign, in all competitions.

In June 2012, Pérez was loaned to Real Betis in a season-long loan. Still owned by Atlético, he represented in the following years Elche CF, Serie A's Torino FC and Granada CF; he signed a permanent four-year deal with the latter on 8 August 2015.

=== Leganés ===
On 9 August 2016, Pérez was loaned to fellow top-tier club CD Leganés in a season-long deal. The following 29 June, his loan was extended for a further year.

Pérez returned to Leganés on a four-year contract after cutting ties with Granada. He scored once from 26 appearances in 2019–20, but his team returned to the Segunda División after a four-year stay.

=== Greece ===
On 14 July 2021, Panathinaikos F.C. signed Pérez on a two-year contract for an undisclosed fee. During his spell, he won the Greek Football Cup in 2021–22 and 2023–24, starting in both finals.

Pérez remained in the Super League subsequently, with the 36-year-old joining A.E. Kifisia F.C. ahead of the 2025–26 season.

== Career statistics ==
As of 25 May 2024

Appearances and goals by club, season and competition
Club	Season	League			Cup		Continental		Total	
Club	Season	Division	Apps	Goals	Apps	Goals	Apps	Goals	Apps	Goals
Atlético Madrid	2009–10	La Liga	1	0	0	0	0	0	1	0
Deportivo La Coruña (loan)	2010–11	La Liga	32	0	5	0	—		37	0
Getafe (loan)	2011–12	La Liga	9	0	1	0	—		10	0
Betis (loan)	2012–13	La Liga	25	1	5	0	—		30	1
Elche (loan)	2013–14	La Liga	31	0	1	0	—		32	0
Torino (loan)	2014–15	Serie A	6	0	0	0	2	0	8	0
Granada (loan)	2014–15	La Liga	14	0	—		—		14	0
Granada	2015–16	La Liga	31	0	1	0	—		32	0
Granada	Total		45	0	1	0	—		46	0
Leganés (loan)	2016–17	La Liga	30	0	2	0	—		32	0
Leganés (loan)	2017–18	La Liga	31	0	5	0	—		36	0
Leganés	2018–19	La Liga	31	0	1	0	—		32	0
Leganés	2019–20	La Liga	26	1	2	0	—		28	1
Leganés	2020–21	Segunda División	37	0	0	0	—		37	0
Leganés	Total		155	1	10	0	—		165	1
Panathinaikos	2021–22	Super League Greece	32	0	8	0	—		40	0
Panathinaikos	2022–23	Super League Greece	35	0	4	0	2	0	41	0
Panathinaikos	2023–24	Super League Greece	22	0	6	1	9	0	37	1
Panathinaikos	Total		89	0	18	1	11	0	118	1
Career total			393	2	41	1	13	0	447	3

== Honours ==
Panathinaikos

- Greek Cup: 2021–22, 2023–24

Spain U21

- UEFA European Under-21 Championship: 2011

Individual

- Super League Greece Team of the Season: 2022–23
