= Cássio Júnior =

Brazilian footballer

Cássio
Personal information
- Full name: Cássio Luiz da Silva Júnior
- Date of birth: 20 June 1999 (age 27)
- Place of birth: Osasco, Brazil
- Height: 1.84 m (6 ft 0 in)
- Position: Defensive midfielder

Team information
- Current team: Real Ávila
- Number: 12

Youth career
- 2014–2019: São Paulo

Senior career*
| Years | Team | Apps | (Gls) |
| 2019 | São Paulo | 0 | (0) |
| 2019 | → Portimonense (loan) | 0 | (0) |
| 2019–2020 | Leganés B | 40 | (3) |
| 2020–2022 | Leganés | 4 | (0) |
| 2021–2022 | → Atlético Baleares (loan) | 7 | (0) |
| 2022–2024 | Cartagena B | 33 | (0) |
| 2024– | Real Ávila | 13 | (1) |
- * Club domestic league appearances and goals as of 15 June 2025

Cássio Luiz da Silva Júnior (born 20 June 1999), better known as Cássio Júnior or simply Cássio, is a Brazilian professional footballer who plays as a defensive midfielder for Spanish club Real Ávila.

== Career ==
Cássio began his career in São Paulo's youth sectors, being highlighted in the 2018 and 2019 Copa SP campaigns. However, he received a lot of criticism after a missed penalty against Cruzeiro EC, in the 2019 edition, ended up being loaned to Portimonense SC. On 24 January 2020, Cássio was traded to CD Leganés in Spain.

== Honours ==
São Paulo

- Copa São Paulo de Futebol Jr.: 2019
- Campeonato Brasileiro Sub-23: 2018
- Copa do Brasil Sub-20: 2018
- Supercopa do Brasil Sub-20: 2018
