= Juan Muñoz (footballer, born 1995) =

Spanish footballer

Personal information
- Full name: Juan Muñoz Muñoz
- Date of birth: 12 November 1995 (age 30)
- Place of birth: Utrera, Spain
- Height: 1.79 m (5 ft 10 in)
- Position: Forward

Team information
- Current team: União Leiria
- Number: 9

Youth career
- Sevilla

Senior career*
Years	Team	Apps	(Gls)
2014–2015	Sevilla B	47	(18)
2014–2018	Sevilla	9	(1)
2016–2017	→ Zaragoza (loan)	15	(3)
2017	→ Levante (loan)	6	(3)
2017–2018	→ Almería (loan)	25	(4)
2018–2019	Alcorcón	37	(13)
2019–2023	Leganés	82	(14)
2019–2020	→ Almería (loan)	34	(9)
2023–2024	Zagłębie Lubin	25	(4)
2023	Zagłębie Lubin II	1	(2)
2024–	União Leiria	74	(35)

International career
2014	Spain U19	1	(2)
- * Club domestic league appearances and goals as of 22:22, 9 November 2026 (UTC)

Juan Muñoz Muñoz (born 12 November 1995) is a Spanish professional footballer who plays as a forward for Liga Portugal 2 club União de Leiria.

He totalled 199 games and 46 goals in the Segunda División over seven seasons, with Zaragoza, Levante, Almería (two spells), Alcorcón and Leganés. He added nine appearances in La Liga, all with Sevilla.

== Club career ==
Born in Utrera, Province of Seville, Andalusia, Muñoz graduated from Sevilla FC's youth system. He made his senior debut with the reserves in 2013–14 in the Segunda División B, scoring a career-best 14 goals the following season.

On 15 February 2014, Muñoz extended his contract with the club, running until 2016. On 13 July, he was called up by first-team manager Unai Emery for the preseason, and scored a goal against Eintracht Braunschweig later that month.

On 3 December 2014, Muñoz made his competitive debut with the main squad, coming on as a substitute for Kevin Gameiro in the 75th minute of a 5–1 home rout of CE Sabadell FC in the round of 32 of the Copa del Rey. On 8 February 2015, again from the bench, he first appeared in La Liga, in a 2–1 loss at Getafe CF.

Muñoz signed a new deal with Sevilla on 4 January 2016, renewing until 2019 and being definitely promoted to the first team. He scored his first professional goal 24 days later, contributing to the 3–0 away victory over CD Mirandés in the quarter-finals of the domestic cup (5–0 aggregate). His only goal in the top flight came on the last day of the season, a consolation in a 3–1 defeat at Athletic Bilbao.

On 31 August 2016, Muñoz was loaned to Segunda División side Real Zaragoza in a season-long move. The following 24 January, he joined Levante UD of the same league also in a temporary deal.

On 8 August 2017, Muñoz was loaned to UD Almería for the upcoming campaign. On 1 July 2018, he cut ties with Sevilla and signed a two-year contract with second-tier AD Alcorcón on 28 July, scoring 13 times in his only season.

Muñoz agreed to a four-year deal at CD Leganés of the top division in June 2019, but returned to Almería on 2 September on loan. He moved abroad for the first time in his career in summer 2023, with Polish Ekstraklasa's Zagłębie Lubin; he left the club in June 2024, when a clause to shorten his two-year contract was activated.

On 24 July 2024, Munõz joined U.D. Leiria of Liga Portugal 2 on a two-year contract. The following 16 March, he scored all of his team's goals in a 3–1 home win over C.D. Mafra; with a further two from the previous two rounds, he was subsequently voted Player of the Month, being crowned top scorer at the end of the season alongside F.C. Alverca's Anthony Carter at 15 but winning the individual accolade by playing fewer minutes.

== International career ==
On 15 April 2014, Muñoz scored twice for the Spain under-19 team in a 4–0 friendly win over Serbia in Daimiel.
