= Rodrigo Tarín =

Spanish footballer

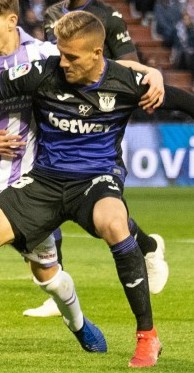
- Tarín with Leganés in 2018

Personal information
- Full name: Rodrigo Tarín Higón
- Date of birth: 5 July 1996 (age 30)
- Place of birth: Chiva, Spain
- Height: 1.82 m (5 ft 11 1/2 in)
- Position: Centre back

Youth career
- 2002–2011: Valencia
- 2010–2011: → Crack's (loan)
- 2011–2015: Barcelona

Senior career*
Years	Team	Apps	(Gls)
2015–2018	Barcelona B	50	(1)
2018–2022	Leganés	70	(0)
2022–2024	Oviedo	27	(1)

International career
2011–2012	Spain U16	8	(0)
2011–2013	Spain U17	10	(1)
2014	Spain U18	2	(0)
2013	Spain U19	4	(0)
- * Club domestic league appearances and goals as of 29 March 2023

Rodrigo Tarín Higón (born 5 July 1996) is a Spanish former professional footballer who played as a central defender.

== Club career ==
=== Barcelona ===
Born in Chiva, Valencian Community, Tarín joined FC Barcelona's youth categories in 2011, from Valencia CF. On 18 September 2014, he renewed his contract until 2018, and was promoted to the reserves in Segunda División B the following July.

Tarín made his senior debut on 22 August 2015, starting in a 1–2 away loss against UE Cornellà. He scored his first senior goal on 17 September of the following year, netting the winner in a 2–1 home success over CD Atlético Baleares; in November, however, he suffered a knee injury which kept him out for six months.

Tarín made his professional debut on 19 August 2017, starting in a 2–1 away win against Real Valladolid in the Segunda División.

=== Leganés ===
On 27 June 2018, Tarín signed a three-year deal with La Liga side CD Leganés. He made his debut in the main category of Spanish football on 26 September, starting in a 2–1 home defeat of former side Barcelona.

In October 2020, shortly after relegation to the second tier, Tarín extended his contract with the Community of Madrid side until 2023. On 31 January 2022, after being sparingly used, he terminated his contract with the club.

=== Oviedo ===
On 31 January 2022, just hours after leaving Leganés, Tarín signed a three-and-a-half-year deal with fellow second division side Real Oviedo. He suffered a knee injury in March 2023 which left him sidelined for the entire 2023–24 season, and terminated his link on 19 July 2024.

== Honours ==
=== Club ===
Barcelona

- UEFA Youth League: 2013–14
