= Manu Garrido =

Spanish footballer (born 2000)

Personal information
- Full name: Manuel Garrido Álvarez
- Date of birth: 6 October 2000 (age 26)
- Place of birth: Madrid, Spain
- Height: 1.90 m (6 ft 3 in)
- Position: Forward

Team information
- Current team: Vizela
- Number: 9

Youth career
- 2013–2019: Leganés

Senior career*
Years	Team	Apps	(Gls)
2017–2019	Leganés B	37	(9)
2020–2023	Leganés	7	(0)
2020–2021	→ Hércules (loan)	20	(4)
2021–2022	→ UCAM Murcia (loan)	22	(3)
2023	→ Celta B (loan)	10	(0)
2023–2024	Celta B	8	(2)
2024–2025	Fuenlabrada	28	(10)
2025–	Vizela	16	(2)
- * Club domestic league appearances and goals as of 19 May 2026

Manuel "Manu" Garrido Álvarez (born 6 October 2000) is a Spanish footballer who plays as a forward for Liga Portugal 2 club Vizela.

== Club career ==
Born in Madrid, Garrido joined CD Leganés' youth setup in 2013 at the age of 12. On 27 August 2017, aged just 16, he made his senior debut with the reserves by coming on as a late substitute for Álex Mozo in a 3–2 Tercera División away win against AD Alcorcón B.

Garrido scored his first senior goal on 31 March 2019, netting his team's second in a 3–0 away defeat of AD Parla. Despite being sparingly used for the B's since 2017, he only finished his formation in 2019, being definitely promoted to the reserve team in July of the latter year.

Garrido made his first team – and La Liga – debut on 27 June 2020, replacing Roque Mesa late into a 1–2 loss at CA Osasuna. On 28 September, he renewed his contract until 2024 and was immediately loaned to Segunda División B side Hércules CF for the season.

On 30 August 2021, Garrido moved to Primera División RFEF side UCAM Murcia CF on loan for one year. Upon returning, he was assigned to the main squad, but left the club again in a temporary deal on 11 January 2023, to Celta de Vigo B; he also renewed his contract with Lega until 2025 prior to the move.

On 28 July 2023, Garrido signed a permanent three-year contract with Celta's B-team.

On 13 July 2024, Garrido moved to Fuenlabrada on a one-season deal.

On 17 June 2025, Garrido signed a two-season contract with Vizela in Portuguese second tier.
