= Javi Rubio (footballer, born 1999) =

Spanish footballer

Personal information
- Full name: Javier Rubio Haro
- Date of birth: 12 May 1999 (age 27)
- Place of birth: Madrid, Spain
- Position: Right back

Youth career
- Rayo Vallecano

Senior career*
Years	Team	Apps	(Gls)
2017–2020	Rayo Vallecano B	52	(2)
2020–2023	Leganés B	44	(2)
2020–2022	Leganés	1	(0)
Total		97	(4)
- * Club domestic league appearances and goals

Javier "Javi" Rubio Haro (born 12 May 1999) is a Spanish retired footballer who played as a right back.

== Club career ==
Born in Madrid, Rubio finished his formation with Rayo Vallecano. He made his senior debut with the reserves on 29 October 2017, playing the last seven minutes in a 1–0 Tercera División home win against CF San Agustín del Guadalix.

Rubio scored his first senior goal on 24 March 2019, netting the opener in a 2–0 home success over Villaverde San Andrés. In December, after being regularly called up by Paco Jémez to train with the first team, he suffered a knee injury which sidelined him for the remainder of the season.

On 16 September 2020, Rubio signed for CD Leganés, being initially assigned to the reserves also in the fourth division. Four days later he made his professional debut, starting in a 1–2 away loss against CD Lugo in the Segunda División.

Rubio spent the entire 2022–23 season nursing another knee injury, and announced his retirement at the age of 24 on 31 October 2023.
