= William de Camargo =

Brazilian footballer (born 2000)

William
Personal information
- Full name: William de Camargo
- Date of birth: 27 February 1999 (age 27)
- Place of birth: São José do Rio Preto, Brazil
- Height: 1.69 m (5 ft 7 in)
- Position: Winger

Team information
- Current team: Lorca Deportiva
- Number: 22

Youth career
- Derac
- América-SP
- 2013−2017: São Paulo
- 2017−2018: Leganés

Senior career*
Years	Team	Apps	(Gls)
2017–2019	Leganés B	10	(1)
2018–2019	→ Karpaty Lviv (loan)	1	(0)
2019–2024	Leganés	0	(0)
2019–2021	→ Cartagena (loan)	31	(3)
2021	→ Valencia B (loan)	12	(0)
2021–2022	→ Deportivo La Coruña (loan)	31	(3)
2022–2023	→ Deinze (loan)	2	(0)
2024	Fuenlabrada	6	(0)
2025	Real Ávila	7	(1)
2025–2026	Arenteiro	12	(0)
2026–	Lorca Deportiva	9	(0)
- * Club domestic league appearances and goals as of 15 May 2026

William de Camargo (born 27 February 1999), sometimes known as just William, is a Brazilian footballer who plays as a winger for Spanish Segunda Federación club Lorca Deportiva.

== Club career ==
Born in Ribeirão Preto, São Paulo, William joined São Paulo FC's youth setup in 2013, after impressing for clubs in his hometown. In April 2017, he moved to La Liga side CD Leganés, after his contract with Tricolor expired.

Initially assigned to the youth setup, William made his senior debut with the reserves on 25 February 2018, coming on as a late substitute in a 5–0 Tercera División away routing of CDF Tres Cantos. His first goal came on 29 April, as he scored his team's first in a 2–2 home draw against CD Móstoles URJC.

On 30 August 2018, after spending the whole pre-season with the first team, William signed a one year loan deal with Ukrainian Premier League side FC Karpaty Lviv. He made his professional debut on 15 September, replacing Maryan Shved at half-time in a 0–1 home loss against FC Vorskla Poltava.

On 2 September 2019, William was loaned to Segunda División B side FC Cartagena for the season. The following 22 August, after helping in the club's promotion to the second division, his loan was extended for a further campaign.

On 14 January 2021, William left Efesé after his loan was cut short, and subsequently moved to Valencia CF Mestalla also in a temporary deal just hours later. On 5 July, he renewed his contract with Lega until 2023, and moved to Deportivo de La Coruña on loan.

On 1 September 2022, William was loaned to Belgian First Division B side K.M.S.K. Deinze, for one year.
