= Unai Bustinza =

Spanish footballer (born 1992)

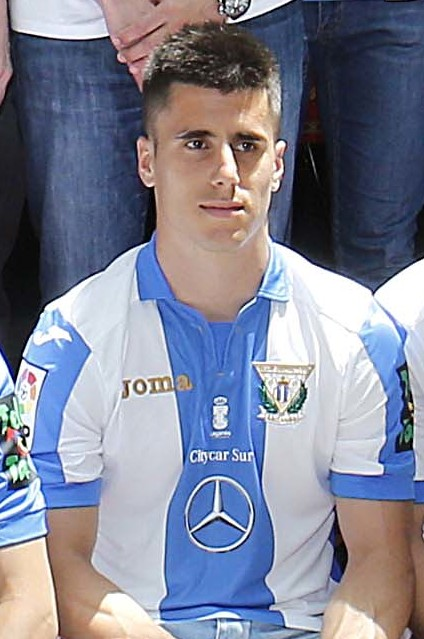
- Bustinza with Leganés in 2016

Personal information
- Full name: Unai Bustinza Martínez
- Date of birth: 2 February 1992 (age 34)
- Place of birth: Bilbao, Spain
- Height: 1.75 m (5 ft 9 in)
- Position: Right-back

Youth career
- 2001–2002: Santutxu
- 2002–2011: Athletic Bilbao

Senior career*
Years	Team	Apps	(Gls)
2010–2011	Basconia	28	(2)
2011–2014	Bilbao Athletic	83	(7)
2014–2016	Athletic Bilbao	2	(0)
2015–2016	→ Leganés (loan)	15	(0)
2016–2022	Leganés	130	(2)
2022–2023	Málaga	10	(0)
2024	Amorebieta	17	(1)

International career
2019	Basque Country	1	(0)
- * Club domestic league appearances and goals as of 8 June 2024

Unai Bustinza Martínez (born 2 February 1992) is a Spanish professional footballer who plays as a right-back.

== Club career ==
=== Athletic Bilbao ===
Born in Bilbao, Biscay, Bustinza joined Athletic Bilbao's prolific youth system in 2002, aged ten. He made his debut as a senior with the club's farm team in the 2010–11 season, in the Tercera División.

In May 2011, Bustinza was promoted to the reserves in the Segunda División B. He appeared regularly for them the following campaigns, scoring a career-best five goals in 2012–13.

On 15 July 2014, Bustinza was promoted to the Basques' main squad in La Liga. He made his debut in the competition on 25 August, coming on as a late substitute in a 1–0 away win over UD Almería.

Bustinza was handed his first start for the Lions on 2 May 2015, being sent off in the 93rd minute of the 0–0 draw with Atlético Madrid for two bookable offences. Later that month, he played the full 90 minutes in the final of the Copa del Rey against FC Barcelona, a 3–1 loss.

=== Leganés ===
On 22 July 2015, Bustinza was loaned to Segunda División side CD Leganés in a season-long deal. The following 18 July, having contributed 1,134 minutes in all competitions to a top-flight promotion, he signed a permanent three-year contract after cutting ties with Athletic.

Bustinza scored the first of two goals in the Spanish top tier on 21 February 2018, but in a 1–3 home defeat to Real Madrid.

=== Málaga ===
On 2 July 2022, free agent Bustinza joined second-tier Málaga CF on a three-year deal. On 30 June 2023, after suffering relegation, he activated a clause on his contract and left.

=== Amorebieta ===
In November 2023, Bustinza started training with SD Amorebieta. On 18 January 2024, he agreed to a deal at the second-division team.

== International career ==
Bustinza made his debut for the unofficial Basque Country national team in May 2019, in a 0–0 draw away to Panama for which a small, youthful and inexperienced squad was selected.
