= Facundo García =

Uruguayan footballer (born 1999)

Facundo Garcha García
Personal information
- Date of birth: 16 December 1999 (age 26)
- Place of birth: Sarandí Grande, Uruguay
- Height: 1.75 m (5 ft 9 in)
- Position: Midfielder

Team information
- Current team: Omonia 29M
- Number: 14

Youth career
- Club Formativas Boquita

Senior career*
Years	Team	Apps	(Gls)
2016–2018	Boquita	10	(903)
2018–2022	Leganés	0	(0)
2018–2019	→ AEK Larnaca (loan)	21	(0)
2019–2020	→ AEK Larnaca (loan)	14	(1)
2020–2021	→ Valencia B (loan)	18	(1)
2021–2022	→ Sabadell (loan)	24	(0)
2022–2023	Badalona	27	(1)
2023–2024	Teruel	28	(1)
2024–2025	Omonia 29M	24	(2)
2025–2026	RFS	5	(0)
2026	→ Super Nova (loan)	15	(0)
2026–	Omonia 29M	3	(0)
- * Club domestic league appearances and goals as of 15:53, 9 November 2026 (UTC)

Facundo García (born 16 December 1999) is an Uruguayan professional footballer who plays as a midfielder for Cypriot First Division club Omonia 29M.

== Club career ==
García started with Olimpo. He was an unused substitute for an Argentine Primera División match with Newell's Old Boys in May 2017, prior to being reintroduced into the first-team in February 2018 and making his professional debut on 5 March during a 1–0 defeat to Estudiantes. On 9 July 2018, García was transferred to Spanish side Leganés; signing a five-year contract. In the following August, he was loaned out to AEK Larnaca of the Cypriot First Division. He was part of the squad that won the 2018 Super Cup against APOEL. He went back to Leganés in June 2019, though would rejoin AEK on loan on 29 August.

García returned to Leganés at the end of June 2020, having made forty-five appearances for AEK Larnaca across two seasons; he also scored his first senior goal in the process, netting in a 5–2 away win over Ethnikos Achna on 11 January 2020. On 4 October, García was loaned to Segunda División B with Valencia CF Mestalla. He was sent off on debut during a 2–2 draw away to Atzeneta on 17 October.

On 6 August 2021, García moved to Primera División RFEF side CE Sabadell FC on a one-year loan.

== International career ==
In April 2018, García was selected to train with the Argentina U19 team. He subsequently received a call-up for their 2018 South American Games squad, and scored on his debut during a draw with Chile.

== Career statistics ==
As of 22 December 2020.

Appearances and goals by club, season and competition
Club	Season	League			National cup (Note: Includes Cypriot Cup)		Continental		Other		Total	
Club	Season	Division	Apps	Goals	Apps	Goals	Apps	Goals	Apps	Goals	Apps	Goals
Olimpo	2016–17	Argentine Primera División	0	0	0	0	—		0	0	0	0
Olimpo	2017–18	Argentine Primera División	10	0	0	0	—		0	0	10	0
Olimpo	Total		10	0	0	0	—		0	0	10	0
Leganés	2018–19	La Liga	0	0	0	0	—		0	0	0	0
Leganés	2019–20	La Liga	0	0	0	0	—		0	0	0	0
Leganés	Total		0	0	0	0	—		0	0	0	0
AEK Larnaca (loan)	2018–19	Cypriot First Division	21	0	2	0	5 (Note: Appearances in UEFA Europa League)	0	1 (Note: Appearance in Cypriot Super Cup)	0	29	0
AEK Larnaca (loan)	2019–20	Cypriot First Division	14	1	2	0	0	0	0	0	16	1
AEK Larnaca (loan)	Total		35	1	4	0	5	0	1	0	45	1
Valencia B (loan)	2020–21	Segunda División B	4	0	—		—		0	0	4	0
Career total			49	1	4	0	5	0	1	0	59	1

== Honours ==
AEK Larnaca

- Cypriot Super Cup: 2018
