= Javier Avilés =

Spanish footballer

Personal information
- Full name: Óscar Javier Avilés Cortés
- Date of birth: 17 August 1997 (age 29)
- Place of birth: Madrid, Spain
- Height: 1.81 m (5 ft 11 in)
- Position: Winger

Team information
- Current team: Algeciras
- Number: 17

Youth career
- Coslada
- 2015–2016: Leganés

Senior career*
Years	Team	Apps	(Gls)
2015	Coslada	5	(0)
2016–2017	Atlético Baleares	8	(0)
2017	Pobla Mafumet	12	(1)
2017–2018	Rayo Cantabria	14	(4)
2018–2020	Leganés B	54	(9)
2018–2024	Leganés	34	(1)
2022	→ Tondela (loan)	6	(0)
2023	→ Lugo (loan)	16	(1)
2023–2024	→ Amorebieta (loan)	15	(1)
2024	→ Málaga (loan)	11	(0)
2024–	Algeciras	32	(3)
- * Club domestic league appearances and goals as of 10 June 2026

Javier Avilés Cortés (born 17 August 1997), sometimes known as Avi, is a Spanish professional footballer who plays as a right winger for Algeciras.

== Club career ==
Born in Madrid, Avilés joined CD Leganés' youth setup in 2015, after already having made his senior debut with CD Coslada. On 27 August 2016, after finishing his formation, he signed for Segunda División B side CD Atlético Baleares.

On 27 January 2017, after being rarely used, Avilés terminated his contract and signed for Tercera División side CF Pobla de Mafumet five days later. In July, he moved to fellow fourth division side Deportivo Rayo Cantabria.

On 2 February 2018, Avilés returned to Leganés and was assigned to the reserves also in the fourth tier. He made his first-team debut on 30 October, coming on as a late substitute for goalscorer Youssef En-Nesyri in a 2–2 home draw against Rayo Vallecano, for the season's Copa del Rey.

Avilés made his La Liga debut on 25 August 2019, replacing Javier Eraso late into a 0–1 home loss against Atlético Madrid. On 23 December, he renewed his contract until 2023.

Avilés scored his first goal in the main category of Spanish football on 27 June 2020, netting the equalizer in a 1–2 loss at CA Osasuna. On 18 August of the following year, he renewed his contract until 2026.

On 15 January 2022, after being rarely used in the first half of the campaign, Avilés was loaned to Portuguese Primeira Liga side C.D. Tondela until June. Back to the club for the 2022–23 season, he featured rarely before moving to CD Lugo on 25 January 2023, also in a temporary deal.

On 31 August 2023, Avilés moved to fellow second division side SD Amorebieta on a one-year loan deal. The following 1 February, his loan was terminated and he subsequently moved to Primera Federación side Málaga CF also in a temporary deal.

Upon returning, Avilés terminated his link with Lega on 30 August 2024.

A week later, he signed with Algeciras in Primera Federación.
