= 2021–22 Copa del Rey =

Tournament details
- Country: Spain
- Date: 17 November 2021 – 23 April 2022
- Teams: 126

Final positions
- Champions: Real Betis (3rd title)
- Runners-up: Valencia

Tournament statistics
- Matches played: 121
- Goals scored: 369 (3.05 per match)
- Top goal scorer: Borja Iglesias (5 goals)

The 2021–22 Copa del Rey was the 120th staging of the Copa del Rey (including two seasons where two rival editions were played). The winners were assured a place in the 2022–23 UEFA Europa League group stage. Both the winners and the runners-up qualified for the four-team 2023 Supercopa de España.

Barcelona were the defending champions, but they were eliminated by previous two seasons' runners-up Athletic Club in the round of 16. Real Betis won the final 5–4 over Valencia on penalties following a 1–1 draw after extra time for their third Copa del Rey title.

As across Spain, match times up to 31 October 2021 and from 27 March 2022 were CEST (UTC+2). Times on interim ("winter") days were CET (UTC+1). Matches played in the Canary Islands used the WET (UTC±00:00).

== Schedule and format ==
In August 2021, the RFEF released the calendar of the competition and confirmed the format of the previous season would remain.

Round	Draw date	Date	Fixtures	Clubs	Format details
Preliminary	28 October 2021	17 November 2021	10	126 → 116	New entries: Clubs qualify through the 2020–21 fifth tier. Opponents seeding: Teams faced each other according to proximity criteria. Local team seeding: Luck of the draw. Knock-out tournament type: Single match
First round	18 November 2021	30 November – 2 December 2021	56	116 → 60	New entries: All qualified teams except the four participants in the Supercopa de España. Opponents seeding: Teams from La Liga faced teams from the lowest divisions. The four remaining teams faced teams from Segunda División B. Local team seeding: Match played at home of team in lower division. Knock-out tournament type: Single match.
Second round	3 December 2021	14–16 December 2021	28	60 → 32	Opponents seeding: Teams from lowest divisions faced La Liga teams. Local team seeding: Match played at home of team in lower division. Knock-out tournament type: Single match
Round of 32	17 December 2021	4–6 January 2022	16	32 → 16	New entries: Clubs participating in the Supercopa de España gained entry. Opponents seeding: Teams from lowest divisions faced La Liga teams. Local team seeding: Match played at home of team in lower division. Knock-out tournament type: Single match.
Round of 16	7 January 2022	15, 16, 19 & 20 January 2022	8	16 → 8	Opponents seeding: Teams from lowest divisions faced La Liga teams. Local team seeding: Match played at home of team in lower division. Knock-out tournament type: Single match.
Quarter-finals	21 January 2022	2 & 3 February 2022	4	8 → 4	Opponents seeding: Luck of the draw. Local team seeding: Match played at home of team in lower division. Knock-out tournament type: Single match.
Semi-finals	4 February 2022	9 & 10 February 2022	2	4 → 2	Opponents seeding: Luck of the draw. Local team seeding: Luck of the draw. Knock-out tournament type: Double match.
Semi-finals	4 February 2022	2 & 3 March 2022	2	4 → 2	Opponents seeding: Luck of the draw. Local team seeding: Luck of the draw. Knock-out tournament type: Double match.
Final	4 February 2022	23 April 2022	1	2 → 1	Single match at Estadio de La Cartuja, Seville. Both teams qualify for the 2023 Supercopa de España. UEFA Europa League qualification: winners qualify for the 2022–23 UEFA Europa League group stage.**

Notes

- From this season on, the away goals rule in the semi-finals was abolished.
- Games ending in a draw were decided in extra time, and if still level, by a penalty shoot-out.

== Qualified teams ==
The following teams qualified for the competition. Reserve teams were excluded.

La Liga; All 20 teams of the 2020–21 season	Segunda División; All 22 teams of the 2020–21 season	Segunda División B All teams of each one of the five promotion groups (C), all winning teams and the two second-placed teams of each one of the five promotion groups (D) of the 2020–21 season	Tercera División; The best teams plus the best fourteen runners-up of each one of the thirty-six promotion groups (A) and (B) of the 2020–21 season	Copa Federación; The four semifinalists of the 2021 Copa Federación de España	Regional leagues The best non-promoted teams of the twenty groups of the fifth tier in the 2020–21 season
Alavés; Athletic Bilbao (Note: Athletic Bilbao, Atlético Madrid, Barcelona and Real Madrid joined the tournament in the round of 32, as participants of the Supercopa de España.); Atlético Madrid; Barcelona^{TH}; Cádiz; Celta Vigo; Eibar; Elche; Getafe; Granada; Huesca; Levante; Osasuna; Real Betis; Real Madrid; Real Sociedad; Sevilla; Valencia; Valladolid; Villarreal	Albacete; Alcorcón; Almería; Cartagena; Castellón; Espanyol; Fuenlabrada; Girona; Las Palmas; Leganés; Lugo; Málaga; Mallorca; Mirandés; Ponferradina; Rayo Vallecano; Oviedo; Sabadell; Sporting Gijón; Tenerife; UD Logroñés; Zaragoza	Alcoyano; Algeciras; Amorebieta; Andorra; Atlético Baleares; Atlético Sanluqueño; Badajoz; Burgos; Calahorra; Cornellà; Cultural Leonesa; Deportivo La Coruña; Extremadura; Gimnàstic; Ibiza; Internacional; Linares; Racing Ferrol; Rayo Majadahonda; Real Unión; San Fernando; San Sebastián de los Reyes; SD Logroñés; Talavera; Tudelano; UCAM Murcia; Unionistas; Zamora	Águilas; Alzira; Andratx; Arenteiro; Atlético Mancha Real; Atlético Pulpileño; Bergantiños; Brea; Cacereño; Calvo Sotelo; Cayón; Ceares; Cristo Atlético; Eldense; Europa; Gernika; Gimnástica Segoviana; Ibiza Islas Pitiusas; Llanera; Marchamalo; Mensajero; Montijo; Náxara; Panadería Pulido; Peña Sport; Racing Rioja; San Juan; San Roque de Lepe; Teruel; Unión Adarve; Vélez; Xerez Deportivo	Córdoba; Ebro; Guijuelo; Leioa	Aldeano; Atarfe Industrial; Atlético Espeleño; Ceuta 6 de Junio; Hernani; Huracán Melilla; Alicante; Injerto; Jaraíz; Laguna; Mollerussa; Mora; Nalón; Penya Independent; San Agustín del Guadalix; Solares; Unami; Utrillas; Victoria; Villa de Fortuna

== Preliminary round ==
=== Draw ===
Teams were divided into four groups according to geographical criteria.

Group 1	Group 2	Group 3	Group 4
Aldeano; Hernani; Nalón; Solares; Unami; Victoria	Injerto; Mollerussa; Penya Independent; Utrillas	Alicante; Atarfe Industrial; Atlético Espeleño; Ceuta 6 de Junio; Huracán Melilla; Villa de Fortuna	Jaraíz; Laguna; Mora; San Agustín del Guadalix

=== Matches ===
17 November 2021	Nalón (6)	1–1 (3–4 p)	Solares (6)	Olloniego
15:00	Olay 88'		Pepo 19'	Stadium: Fumea-Lolo Rodríguez
	Penalties
	Corzo (penalty scored); Olay (penalty scored); Mandi (penalty missed); Rodríguez (penalty scored); Samuel (penalty missed)		Pepo (penalty scored); Bada (penalty scored); Raba (penalty scored); León (penalty scored)

17 November 2021	Utrillas (6)	2–0	Injerto (7)	Utrillas
19:00	Hernández 15', 57'			Stadium: La Vega

17 November 2021	Aldeano (6)	1–3	Unami (6)	Aldeanueva de Ebro
19:30	Abouzahr 52'		Peréz 12'; Chechu 75'; Koby 88' (pen.)	Stadium: San Bartolomé

17 November 2021	Victoria (6)	1–0	Hernani (6)	La Coruña
19:30	Pérez 47'			Stadium: A Grela

17 November 2021	San Agustín del Guadalix (6)	6–2	Mora (6)	San Agustín del Guadalix
20:00	Riki 6', 11', 16'; Sánchez 45'; Bas 75'; Cano 78'		Guijarro 34', 60'	Stadium: Campo de Fútbol San Agustín del Guadalix

17 November 2021	Mollerussa (6)	1–0	Penya Independent (6)	Mollerussa
20:30	Guillem 79'			Stadium: Camp Municipal

17 November 2021	Alicante (6)	7–1	Ceuta 6 de Junio (6)	Alicante
20:30	Heredia 22', 71'; Pérez 28'; Piña 61'; Chinchilla 81', 83'; Gombo 89'		Villatoro 57'	Stadium: Antonio Valls

17 November 2021	Villa de Fortuna (6)	1–0	Atlético Espeleño (6)	Fortuna
20:30	Jony 90'			Stadium: José Luis Belda

17 November 2021	Laguna (6)	4–1	Jaraíz (6)	Tegueste (Note: Laguna did not play its game in its main stadium Francisco Peraza, in San Cristóbal de La Laguna, as it did not meet the requirements to broadcast the match.)
20:30	Mehdi 7'; Luca 19', 39'; Alexis 52'		Elena 30'	Stadium: Los Laureles

17 November 2021	Huracán Melilla (6)	2–1	Atarfe Industrial (6)	Melilla
21:00	Yosef 2'; Joselu 81' (pen.)		Diego 7'	Stadium: La Espiguera

== First round ==
The first round was played by 112 of the 116 qualified teams, with the exceptions being the four participants of the 2022 Supercopa de España. The ten winners from the previous preliminary round were paired with ten teams from La Liga. The four Copa Federación semi-finalists with another four teams from La Liga and the last two La Liga teams with two teams from Segunda RFEF. Twenty-one teams from Segunda RFEF were paired with the twenty-one Segunda División teams, the last nine teams from Segunda RFEF were paired with nine Primera RFEF teams. Finally, the remaining twenty teams from Primera RFEF were paired between them. In the case of opponents from the same division, the home advantage was decided by whichever team was drawn first; otherwise, the match was held in the stadium of the lower division team. A total of 56 games were played from 30 November to 2 December 2021.

=== Draw ===
The draw was held on 18 November 2021. Teams were divided into six pots.

Pot 1; 16 teams of La Liga	Pot 2; 21 teams of Segunda División	Pot 3; 29 teams of Primera RFEF	Pot 4; 32 teams of Segunda RFEF	Pot 5; 4 teams qualified through the Copa Federación	Pot 6; 10 winners of the preliminary round
Alavés; Cádiz; Celta Vigo; Elche; Espanyol; Getafe; Granada; Levante; Mallorca; Osasuna; Rayo Vallecano; Real Betis; Real Sociedad; Sevilla; Valencia; Villarreal	Alcorcón; Almería; Amorebieta; Burgos; Cartagena; Eibar; Fuenlabrada; Girona; Huesca; Ibiza; Las Palmas; Leganés; Lugo; Málaga; Mirandés; Ponferradina; Real Oviedo; Sporting Gijón; Tenerife; Valladolid; Zaragoza	Albacete; Alcoyano; Algeciras; Andorra; Atlético Baleares; Atlético Sanluqueño; Badajoz; Calahorra; Castellón; Cornellà; Cultural Leonesa; Deportivo La Coruña; Extremadura; Gimnàstic; Internacional; Linares; Racing Ferrol; Rayo Majadahonda; Real Unión; Sabadell; San Fernando; San Sebastián de los Reyes; SD Logroñés; Talavera; Tudelano; UCAM Murcia; UD Logroñés; Unionistas; Zamora	Águilas; Alzira; Andratx; Arenteiro; Atlético Mancha Real; Atlético Pulpileño; Bergantiños; Brea; Cacereño; Calvo Sotelo; Cayón; Ceares; Cristo Atlético; Eldense; Europa; Gernika; Gimnástica Segoviana; Ibiza Islas Pitiusas; Llanera; Marchamalo; Mensajero; Montijo; Náxara; Panadería Pulido; Peña Sport; Racing Rioja; San Juan; San Roque de Lepe; Teruel; Unión Adarve; Vélez; Xerez Deportivo	Córdoba; Ebro; Guijuelo; Leioa	Alicante; Huracán Melilla; Laguna; Mollerussa; San Agustín del Guadalix; Solares; Unami; Utrillas; Victoria; Villa de Fortuna

=== Matches ===
30 November 2021	Cayón (4)	0–2	Huesca (2)	Cayón
16:00		Report	Mateu 59'; Omoruyi 90+4'	Stadium: Fernando Astobiza; Referee: Óliver de la Fuente Ramos

30 November 2021	Marchamalo (4)	0–1	Valladolid (2)	Marchamalo
16:00		Report	Mesa 89' (pen.)	Stadium: La Solana; Referee: David Gálvez Rascón

30 November 2021	Náxara (4)	0–1	Andorra (3)	Nájera
18:30		Report	Fernández 42' (pen.)	Stadium: La Salera; Referee: David Recio Moreno

30 November 2021	Victoria (6)	0–8	Villarreal (1)	La Coruña (Note: Victoria played its game at Riazor, in La Coruña instead of their regular stadium San Pedro de Visma as it does not meet the requirements established by the Royal Spanish Football Federation.)
19:00		Report	Moreno 17', 22'; Mandi 28'; Alcácer 37'; Chukwueze 50'; Gerard 73'; Dia 82'; Iosifov 87'	Stadium: Riazor; Referee: Pablo González Fuertes

30 November 2021	Laguna (6)	0–7	Granada (1)	Santa Cruz de Tenerife (Note: Laguna played its game at Heliodoro Rodríguez López, in Santa Cruz de Tenerife instead of their regular stadium Francisco Peraza in San Cristóbal de La Laguna as it does not meet the requirements established by the Royal Spanish Football Federation.)
18:00 WET		Report	Bacca 9'; Butzke 32', 44', 54'; Puertas 41'; Molina 67', 76'	Stadium: Heliodoro Rodríguez López; Referee: Valentín Pizarro Gómez

30 November 2021	Unami (6)	0–3	Alavés (1)	Segovia
19:00		Report	Guidetti 66'; Sylla 82'; Rioja 90+1'	Stadium: La Albuera; Referee: Miguel Ángel Ortiz Arias

30 November 2021	Teruel (4)	0–1	Alcorcón (2)	Teruel
20:00		Report	Fraile 28' (pen.)	Stadium: Pinilla; Referee: Rubén Ávalos Barrera

30 November 2021	Racing Rioja (4)	0–2	Cartagena (2)	Logroño (Note: Racing Rioja played its game at Las Gaunas, in Logroño instead of their regular stadium El Salvador as it does not meet the requirements established by the Royal Spanish Football Federation.)
20:00		Report	Ortuño 65', 81'	Stadium: Las Gaunas; Referee: José Antonio López Toca

30 November 2021	Ceares (4)	0–1	Sporting Gijón (2)	Gijón (Note: Ceares played its game at El Molinón, in Gijón instead of their regular stadium La Cruz as it does not meet the requirements established by the Royal Spanish Football Federation.)
20:00		Report	César 38'	Stadium: El Molinón; Referee: Javier Iglesias Villanueva

30 November 2021	Atlético Sanluqueño (3)	2–0	Sabadell (3)	Sanlúcar de Barrameda
20:30	Miguelete 65'; Armental 76'	Report		Stadium: El Palmar; Referee: Alejandro Lucena Perdomo

30 November 2021	Ebro (4)	0–5	Celta Vigo (1)	Zaragoza (Note: Ebro played its game at La Romareda, in Zaragoza instead of their regular stadium La Almozara as it does not meet the requirements established by the Royal Spanish Football Federation.)
21:00		Report	Mina 32'; Solari 43'; Cervi 55', 58'; Fontán 90+2'	Stadium: La Romareda; Referee: Antonio Mateu Lahoz

30 November 2021	Mollerussa (6)	1–5	Getafe (1)	Mollerussa
21:00	Putxi 4'	Report	Mata 19' (pen.), 52' (pen.), 57'; Sandro 58'; Poveda 75'	Stadium: Camp Municipal; Referee: Alejandro Hernández Hernández

30 November 2021	Águilas (4)	1–1 (a.e.t.) (3–5 p)	Almería (2)	Águilas
21:00	Uche 58'	Report	Villar 32'	Stadium: El Rubial; Referee: Saúl Ais Reig
	Penalties
	Trebotić (penalty scored); Álex López (penalty scored); Arcas (penalty scored); Javi Pérez (penalty missed)		Ramazani (penalty scored); Curro (penalty scored); Portillo (penalty scored); Samú (penalty scored); de la Hoz (penalty scored)

30 November 2021	Montijo (4)	0–1	Burgos (2)	Montijo
21:00		Report	Riki 90+4'	Stadium: Emilio Macarro Rodríguez; Referee: Álvaro Moreno Aragón

30 November 2021	Albacete (3)	2–1 (a.e.t.)	Racing Ferrol (3)	Albacete
21:00	Montes 61' (pen.); Dani González 117'	Report	Álex López 43'	Stadium: Carlos Belmonte; Referee: Sergiu Claudiu Mureșan

30 November 2021	Badajoz (3)	0–3	Alcoyano (3)	Badajoz
21:00		Report	Mourad 3'; Jona 77' (pen.); Ángel López 87'	Stadium: Nuevo Vivero; Referee: Manuel Ángel Pérez Hernández

1 December 2021	Mensajero (4)	0–1	Zaragoza (2)	Santa Cruz de La Palma
15:30 WET		Report	Clemente 80'	Stadium: Silvestre Carrillo; Referee: Gorka Sagués Oscoz

1 December 2021	Bergantiños (4)	2–0	Tudelano (3)	Carballo
18:30	Uxío 33'; Alfaya 90+3'	Report		Stadium: As Eiroas; Referee: Alfonso Vicente Moral

1 December 2021	Córdoba (4)	0–1 (a.e.t.)	Sevilla (1)	Córdoba
19:00		Report	Ocampos 108'	Stadium: Nuevo Arcángel; Referee: Jesús Gil Manzano

1 December 2021	Solares (6)	2–3	Espanyol (1)	Solares
19:00	Oslé 75'; Gutiérrez 83'	Report	Loren 15', 23', 50' (pen.)	Stadium: La Estación; Referee: Ricardo de Burgos Bengoetxea

1 December 2021	Gimnástica Segoviana (4)	0–2 (a.e.t.)	Mallorca (1)	Segovia
19:00		Report	Ángel 94', 105+3'	Stadium: La Albuera; Referee: Javier Alberola Rojas

1 December 2021	Brea (4)	0–2	Ibiza (2)	Brea de Aragón
19:00		Report	Davo 32', 76'	Stadium: Piedrabuena; Referee: Iosu Galech Apezteguía

1 December 2021	Algeciras (3)	1–2	Unionistas (3)	Algeciras
19:00	Álvaro Romero 90+4'	Report	Rayco 8', 18'	Stadium: Nuevo Mirador; Referee: Antonio Sánchez Sánchez

1 December 2021	Andratx (4)	2–1	Real Oviedo (2)	Andratx
20:00	Pomar 25'; Llabrés 31'	Report	Jirka 39'	Stadium: Sa Plana; Referee: Iván Caparrós Hernández

1 December 2021	Atlético Mancha Real (4)	2–1	Internacional (3)	Mancha Real
20:00	José Enrique 84'; Rafilla 89'	Report	Pitu 74'	Stadium: La Juventud; Referee: Antonio Alberola Rojas

1 December 2021	Alzira (4)	0–1	Fuenlabrada (2)	Alzira
20:00		Report	Soldano 55'	Stadium: Luis Suñer Picó; Referee: Dámaso Arcediano Monescillo

1 December 2021	San Juan (4)	1–2	San Sebastián de los Reyes (3)	Pamplona
20:00	Burusco 36'	Report	Jauregi 28'; Retegui 73' (o.g.)	Stadium: San Juan; Referee: Sergio Usón Rosel

1 December 2021	UCAM Murcia (3)	3–4 (a.e.t.)	Deportivo La Coruña (3)	Murcia
20:00	Terranova 41'; Raigal 66'; Garrido 116'	Report	William 40'; Quiles 72', 109'; Peke 105+2'	Stadium: La Condomina; Referee: Lluís Bestard Servera

1 December 2021	Panadería Pulido (4)	0–4	Real Sociedad (1)	Las Palmas de Gran Canaria (Note: Panadería Pulido played its game at Gran Canaria, in Las Palmas de Gran Canaria instead of their regular stadium San Mateo in Vega de San Mateo as it does not meet the requirements established by the Royal Spanish Football Federation.)
20:00 WET		Report	Portu 6'; Muñoz 7'; Sørloth 60'; Djouahra 71'	Stadium: Gran Canaria; Referee: Jorge Figueroa Vázquez

1 December 2021	Talavera (3)	2–0	Cornellà (3)	Talavera de la Reina
20:15	Rodrigo 15'; Perales 20'	Report		Stadium: El Prado; Referee: Armando Ramo Andrés

1 December 2021	Cacereño (4)	1–2	Ponferradina (2)	Cáceres
20:30	Barba 75'	Report	Zalazar 67'; Medina 87'	Stadium: Príncipe Felipe; Referee: Alejandro Quintero González

1 December 2021	Arenteiro (4)	2–1	SD Logroñés (3)	O Carballiño
20:30	Zanelli 36'; Sylla 39'	Report	Portela 51' (o.g.)	Stadium: Espiñedo; Referee: Jaime Ruiz Álvarez

1 December 2021	Europa (4)	0–1	Amorebieta (2)	Barcelona
20:30		Report	Amorrortu 35'	Stadium: Nou Sardenya; Referee: Raúl Martín González Francés

1 December 2021	Extremadura (3)	1–4	Zamora (3)	Almendralejo
20:30	Drammeh 80'	Report	Cordero 2'; Losada 11', 65'; Parra 48'	Stadium: Francisco de la Hera; Referee: Daniel Palencia Caballero

1 December 2021	San Fernando (3)	2–3	Cultural Leonesa (3)	San Fernando
20:30	Dopi 42'; Francis 85'	Report	Amelibia 6'; Solís 24'; Ketu 56'	Stadium: Bahía Sur; Referee: Alexandre Alemán Pérez

1 December 2021	Calahorra (3)	1–1 (a.e.t.) (4–5 p)	Atlético Baleares (3)	Calahorra
20:30	Yurrebaso 25'		Ginard 90+4'	Stadium: La Planilla; Referee: Albert Catalá Ferrán
	Penalties
	Ramirez (penalty scored); Jesús Álvarez (penalty scored); Sarriegi (penalty scored); David Grande (penalty missed); David Soto (penalty scored); Zabaleta (penalty missed)		Castaño (penalty scored); Vinicius Tanque (penalty scored); Martínez (penalty scored); Shashoua (penalty missed); Vilarrasa (penalty scored); Ferrone (penalty scored)

1 December 2021	Linares (3)	0–0 (a.e.t.) (6–5 p)	Gimnàstic (3)	Linares
20:30		Report		Stadium: Linarejos; Referee: José David Martínez Montalbán
	Penalties
	Meléndez (penalty scored); Fran Lara (penalty scored); Copete (penalty missed); Barbosa (penalty scored); Díaz (penalty scored); Josema (penalty scored); Sanchidrián (penalty scored)		Albarrán (penalty scored); Aythami (penalty missed); Ballesteros (penalty scored); Oriol (penalty scored); Edgar (penalty scored); Buyla (penalty scored); Ribelles (penalty missed)

1 December 2021	Alicante (6)	0–4	Real Betis (1)	Alcoy (Note: Alicante played its game at El Collao, in Alcoy instead of their regular stadium Antonio Solana in Alicante as it does not meet the requirements established by the Royal Spanish Football Federation.)
21:00		Report	Tello 7'; Lainez 28'; Joaquín 47'; Bartra 52'	Stadium: El Collao; Referee: Carlos del Cerro Grande

1 December 2021	San Roque de Lepe (4)	0–3	Mirandés (2)	Lepe
21:00		Report	Olguín 13'; Marqués 59', 75'	Stadium: Ciudad de Lepe; Referee: Francisco Hernández Maeso

2 December 2021	Vélez (4)	2–3	Las Palmas (2)	Vélez-Málaga
16:00	Joselinho 10'; Veiga 33' (o.g.)	Report	Benito 27'; Sadiku 43'; Ale García 83'	Stadium: Vivar Téllez; Referee: Rafael Sánchez López

2 December 2021	San Agustín del Guadalix (6)	0–4	Osasuna (1)	San Agustín del Guadalix
19:00		Report	Barbero 50'; Torres 61'; Ontiveros 72'; Ávila 90+1'	Stadium: Campo de Fútbol San Agustín del Guadalix; Referee: Santiago Jaime Latre

2 December 2021	Huracán Melilla (6)	0–8	Levante (1)	Melilla (Note: Huracán Melilla played its game at Álvarez Claro, in Melilla instead of their regular stadium La Espiguera as it does not meet the requirements established by the Royal Spanish Football Federation.)
19:00		Report	Soldado 2', 22'; Blesa 29', 30', 63'; Malsa 51'; Gómez 52', 58'	Stadium: Álvarez Claro; Referee: Mario Melero López

2 December 2021	Guijuelo (5)	1–1 (a.e.t.) (3–4 p)	Rayo Vallecano (1)	Guijuelo
19:00	Toti 19'	Report	Pozo 5'	Stadium: Municipal; Referee: Alejandro Muñiz Ruiz
	Penalties
	Rodríguez (penalty missed); Caramelo (penalty scored); Rubén (penalty scored); Toti (penalty scored); Cristóbal (penalty missed)		Suárez (penalty missed); Palazón (penalty scored); Trejo (penalty scored); Comesaña (penalty scored); Guardiola (penalty scored)

2 December 2021	Gernika (4)	1–2	Eibar (2)	Gernika
19:00	Arana 71'	Report	Quique 36'; Blanco 62'	Stadium: Urbieta; Referee: Eduardo Prieto Iglesias

2 December 2021	Utrillas (6)	0–3	Valencia (1)	Utrillas
19:30		Report	Marcos André 27'; Musah 52'; Koindredi 70'	Stadium: La Vega; Referee: César Soto Grado

2 December 2021	Peña Sport (4)	0–3	Málaga (2)	Tafalla
19:30		Report	Paulino 32'; Lombán 45+2' (pen.); Roberto 74'	Stadium: San Francisco; Referee: Aitor Gorostegui Fernández

2 December 2021	Llanera (4)	2–1	UD Logroñés (3)	Langreo (Note: Llanera played its game at Ganzábal, in Langreo instead of their regular stadium Pepe Quimarán in Posada de Llanera as it does not meet the requirements established by the Royal Spanish Football Federation.)
20:00	Martín Pérez 41'; Javi Sánchez 87'	Report	Dubasin 62'	Stadium: Ganzábal; Referee: José Pardeiro Puente

2 December 2021	Cristo Atlético (4)	2–0	Real Unión (3)	Palencia
20:00	Álvaro Gómez 2' (pen.); Pascual 45+1'	Report		Stadium: Nueva Balastera; Referee: Miguel González Díaz

2 December 2021	Calvo Sotelo (4)	1–5	Girona (2)	Puertollano
20:00	Arcos 24'	Report	Sáiz 19' (pen.); Monjonell 34'; Artero 50'; Camara 61'; García 67'	Stadium: Ciudad de Puertollano; Referee: Luis Milla Alvéndiz

2 December 2021	Atlético Pulpileño (4)	0–1	Castellón (3)	Pulpí
20:00		Report	Esquerdo 27'	Stadium: San Miguel; Referee: David Cambronero González

2 December 2021	Leioa (5)	0–2	Elche (1)	Leioa
20:00		Report	Carrillo 43', 56'	Stadium: Sarriena; Referee: Adrián Cordero Vega

2 December 2021	Unión Adarve (4)	2–2 (a.e.t.) (3–4 p)	Lugo (2)	Madrid
20:15	Portero 29', 49'	Report	Joselu 34'; Barreiro 40' (pen.)	Stadium: Vicente del Bosque; Referee: Daniel Trujillo Suárez
	Penalties
	Cidoncha (penalty missed); Dani Ramos (penalty missed); Mayorga (penalty scored); Albur (penalty scored); Calleja (penalty scored)		Barreiro (penalty scored); Pita (penalty missed); Joselu (penalty scored); Rama (penalty scored); Campabadal (penalty scored)

2 December 2021	Eldense (4)	0–1	Rayo Majadahonda (3)	Elda
20:30		Report	Javi Gómez 10'	Stadium: Nuevo Pepico Amat; Referee: Juan Antonio Campos Salinas

2 December 2021	Xerez Deportivo (4)	1–2	Leganés (2)	Jerez de la Frontera
20:45	Bello 53' (pen.)	Report	Naim 45+1'; Doukouré 87'	Stadium: Chapín; Referee: Juan Pulido Santana

2 December 2021	Ibiza Islas Pitiusas (4)	1–2 (a.e.t.)	Tenerife (2)	Ibiza
21:00	Samu Pinto 57'	Report	Míchel 65' (pen.); Mollejo 103'	Stadium: Can Misses III; Referee: Víctor García Verdura

2 December 2021	Villa de Fortuna (6)	0–7	Cádiz (1)	Murcia (Note: Villa de Fortuna played its game at Nueva Condomina, in Murcia instead of their regular stadium José Luis Belda in Fortuna as it does not meet the requirements established by the Royal Spanish Football Federation.)
21:00		Report	Negredo 3', 52', 90'; Álvaro Jiménez 13'; Marcos Mauro 79'; Calderón 81'; Osmajić 86'	Stadium: Nueva Condomina; Referee: Juan Martínez Munuera

== Second round ==
=== Draw ===
The draw was held on 3 December 2021 in the RFEF headquarters in Las Rozas. Teams were divided into 4 pots according to their division in the 2021–22 season. Matches were played at the stadiums of lower-ranked teams. A total of 28 games were played from 14 to 16 December 2021.

Pot 1; 16 teams of La Liga	Pot 2; 20 teams of Segunda División	Pot 3; 14 teams of Primera RFEF	Pot 4; 6 teams of Segunda RFEF
Alavés; Cádiz; Celta Vigo; Elche; Espanyol; Getafe; Granada; Levante; Mallorca; Osasuna; Rayo Vallecano; Real Betis; Real Sociedad; Sevilla; Valencia; Villarreal	Alcorcón; Almería; Amorebieta; Burgos; Cartagena; Eibar; Fuenlabrada; Girona; Huesca; Ibiza; Las Palmas; Leganés; Lugo; Málaga; Mirandés; Ponferradina; Sporting Gijón; Tenerife; Valladolid; Zaragoza	Albacete; Alcoyano; Andorra; Atlético Baleares; Atlético Sanluqueño; Castellón; Cultural Leonesa; Deportivo La Coruña; Linares; Rayo Majadahonda; San Sebastián de los Reyes; Talavera; Unionistas; Zamora	Andratx; Arenteiro; Atlético Mancha Real; Bergantiños; Cristo Atlético; Llanera

=== Matches ===
14 December 2021	Andorra (3)	1–2 (a.e.t.)	Celta Vigo (1)	Andorra la Vella
19:00	Vilanova 39'	Report	Fontán 14'; Mina 118'	Stadium: Estadi Nacional; Referee: Santiago Jaime Latre

14 December 2021	San Sebastián de los Reyes (3)	0–0 (a.e.t.) (4–5 p)	Fuenlabrada (2)	San Sebastián de los Reyes
19:00		Report		Stadium: Nuevo Matapiñonera; Referee: Óliver de la Fuente Ramos
	Penalties
	Arturo (penalty scored); Molina (penalty missed); Jimé (penalty scored); González (penalty scored); Martínez (penalty missed); Ruiz (penalty scored); Moreno (penalty missed)		(penalty scored) Iribas; (penalty missed) Soldano; (penalty missed) Salvador; (penalty scored) Anderson; (penalty scored) Diéguez; (penalty scored) Pulido; (penalty scored) Timité

14 December 2021	Huesca (2)	0–1	Girona (2)	Huesca
20:00		Report	Calavera 22'	Stadium: El Alcoraz; Referee: Iosu Galech Apezteguía

14 December 2021	Zaragoza (2)	2–0	Burgos (2)	Zaragoza
20:00	Eguaras 34'; González 51'	Report		Stadium: La Romareda; Referee: Aitor Gorostegui Fernández

14 December 2021	Rayo Majadahonda (3)	1–0	Málaga (2)	Majadahonda
20:00	Sánchez 60'	Report		Stadium: Cerro del Espino; Referee: Dámaso Arcediano Monescillo

14 December 2021	Cristo Atlético (4)	1–2	Espanyol (1)	Palencia
21:00	Sualdea 6'	Report	Wu Lei 46'; Gómez 88'	Stadium: Nueva Balastera; Referee: Alejandro Muñiz Ruiz

14 December 2021	Alcoyano (3)	3–3 (a.e.t.) (3–1 p)	Levante (1)	Alcoy
21:00	Mourad 5', 44'; Blanco 55'	Report	Gómez 23', 68'; Soldado 61'	Stadium: El Collao; Referee: Jorge Figueroa Vázquez
	Penalties
	Lillo (penalty missed); Andy (penalty scored); García (penalty scored); Blanco (penalty scored)		(penalty missed) Pepelu; (penalty scored) Morales; (penalty missed) Roger; (penalty missed) Bardhi

14 December 2021	Linares (3)	2–1	Alavés (1)	Linares
21:00	Etxaniz 19'; Copete 73'	Report	Sylla 67'	Stadium: Linarejos; Referee: Isidro Díaz de Mera Escuderos

15 December 2021	Bergantiños (4)	1–3	Rayo Vallecano (1)	Carballo
19:00	Cano 77'	Report	Suárez 37'; Ciss 67'; Moreno 90+1'	Stadium: As Eiroas; Referee: Pablo González Fuertes

15 December 2021	Andratx (4)	1–1 (a.e.t.) (5–6 p)	Sevilla (1)	Andratx
19:00	Llabrés 65'	Report	Mir 57'	Stadium: Sa Plana; Referee: Juan Martínez Munuera
	Penalties
	Lorente (penalty missed); Bonet (penalty scored); Pomar (penalty scored); Vidal (penalty scored); Carrasco (penalty scored); Buades (penalty scored); Alorda (penalty missed)		(penalty scored) Mir; (penalty scored) Gudelj; (penalty missed) Óscar; (penalty scored) Romero; (penalty scored) Luismi; (penalty scored) Gómez; (penalty scored) Delaney

15 December 2021	Zamora (3)	0–3	Real Sociedad (1)	Zamora
19:00		Report	Guridi 47'; Turrientes 70'; Oyarzabal 90+2'	Stadium: Ruta de la Plata; Referee: Valentín Pizarro Gómez

15 December 2021	Cultural Leonesa (3)	2–3 (a.e.t.)	Leganés (2)	León
19:30	Buenacasa 37' (pen.); Gaztañaga 105+1'	Report	Eraso 62'; Bautista 98', 112'	Stadium: Reino de León; Referee: José Antonio López Toca

15 December 2021	Sporting Gijón (2)	2–1 (a.e.t.)	Alcorcón (2)	Gijón
20:00	Méndez 42'; Đurđević 99'	Report	Al Badaoui 57'	Stadium: El Molinón; Attendance: 7,300; Referee: Jon Ander González Esteban

15 December 2021	Ponferradina (2)	2–1 (a.e.t.)	Ibiza (2)	Ponferrada
20:00	Ojeda 48'; Romera 93'	Report	Villar 68'	Stadium: El Toralín; Referee: Javier Iglesias Villanueva

15 December 2021	Valladolid (2)	3–1	Las Palmas (2)	Valladolid
20:00	Anuar 45+2'; Weissman 63'; González 68'	Report	Sadiku 22'	Stadium: José Zorrilla; Referee: Francisco Hernández Maeso

15 December 2021	Castellón (3)	1–2	Cartagena (2)	Castellón de la Plana
20:00	Sibille 48'	Report	Ortuño 28'; Cayarga 90+3'	Stadium: Castàlia; Referee: David Gálvez Rascón

15 December 2021	Unionistas (3)	0–1	Elche (1)	Salamanca
21:00		Report	Román 90+3' (o.g.)	Stadium: Reina Sofía; Referee: Carlos del Cerro Grande

15 December 2021	Tenerife (2)	1–2	Eibar (2)	Santa Cruz de Tenerife
20:00 WET	González 74'	Report	Quique 12'; Expósito 83'	Stadium: Heliodoro Rodríguez López; Referee: Luis Milla Alvéndiz

15 December 2021	Atlético Sanluqueño (3)	1–7	Villarreal (1)	Sanlúcar de Barrameda
21:00	Armental 60'	Report	Alcácer 8', 13'; Duro 27' (o.g.); Chukwueze 40'; Gómez 42'; Trigueros 67'; Raba 79'	Stadium: El Palmar; Referee: Jesús Gil Manzano

16 December 2021	Talavera (3)	2–4 (a.e.t.)	Real Betis (1)	Talavera de la Reina
19:00	Góngora 7' (pen.); Perales 89'	Report	Iglesias 14'; Joaquín 61' (pen.); Lainez 116'; Canales 119'	Stadium: El Prado; Referee: Alejandro Hernández Hernández

16 December 2021	Llanera (4)	0–6	Mallorca (1)	Langreo (Note: Llanera played its game at Ganzábal, in Langreo instead of their regular stadium Pepe Quimarán in Posada de Llanera as it does not meet the requirements established by the Royal Spanish Football Federation.)
19:00		Report	Sedlar 50', 62'; Mboula 55'; Gayá 74'; Llabrés 78'; Ángel 87'	Stadium: Ganzábal; Referee: Ricardo de Burgos Bengoetxea

16 December 2021	Arenteiro (4)	1–3 (a.e.t.)	Valencia (1)	O Carballiño
19:00	Magisano 8'	Report	Musah 1'; Guillamón 99'; Vallejo 113'	Stadium: Espiñedo; Referee: José Luis Munuera Montero

16 December 2021	Amorebieta (2)	1–2	Almería (2)	Amorebieta
19:00	Orozco 56'	Report	Sadiq 24'; Appiah 61'	Stadium: Urritxe; Referee: Eduardo Prieto Iglesias

16 December 2021	Lugo (2)	1–2	Mirandés (2)	Lugo
20:00	Joselu 65'	Report	Marqués 4'; Riquelme 82'	Stadium: Anxo Carro; Referee: Juan Pulido Santana

16 December 2021	Deportivo La Coruña (3)	1–2	Osasuna (1)	A Coruña
21:00	Doncel 23'	Report	Kike 45+3'; Budimir 64'	Stadium: Riazor; Referee: Adrián Cordero Vega

16 December 2021	Atlético Mancha Real (4)	1–0	Granada (1)	Mancha Real
21:00	Enrique 21'	Report		Stadium: La Juventud; Referee: César Soto Grado

16 December 2021	Albacete (3)	0–1	Cádiz (1)	Albacete
21:00		Report	Andone 20'	Stadium: Carlos Belmonte; Referee: José María Sánchez Martínez

16 December 2021	Atlético Baleares (3)	5–0	Getafe (1)	Palma
21:00	Orfila 6', 44'; Dioni 68'; Martínez 70'; Vinicius Tanque 89'	Report		Stadium: Estadio Balear; Referee: Javier Alberola Rojas

== Final phase ==
=== Bracket ===
Round of 32
Girona	1
Osasuna	0
Mirandés	0
Rayo Vallecano	2
Eibar	1
Mallorca	2
Ponferradina	1 (1)
Espanyol (p)	1 (3)
Leganés	2
Real Sociedad	3
Rayo Majadahonda	0
Atlético Madrid	5
Valladolid	0
Real Betis	3
Zaragoza	0
Sevilla	2
Atlético Mancha Real	0
Athletic Bilbao	2
Linares	1
Barcelona	2
Almería	1
Elche	2
Alcoyano	1
Real Madrid	3
Atlético Baleares	2
Celta Vigo	1
Cartagena	1
Valencia	2
Sporting Gijón	2
Villarreal	1
Fuenlabrada	0
Cádiz	1

Round of 16
Girona	1
Rayo Vallecano	2
Mallorca	2
Espanyol	1
Real Sociedad	2
Atlético Madrid	0
Real Betis	2
Sevilla	1
Athletic Bilbao (a.e.t.)	3
Barcelona	2
Elche	1
Real Madrid (a.e.t.)	2
Atlético Baleares	0
Valencia	1
Sporting Gijón	0 (2)
Cádiz (p)	0 (4)

Quarter-finals
Rayo Vallecano	1
Mallorca	0
Real Sociedad	0
Real Betis	4
Athletic Bilbao	1
Real Madrid	0
Valencia	2
Cádiz	1

Semi-finals
Rayo Vallecano	1	1	2
Real Betis	2	1	3
Athletic Bilbao	1	0	1
Valencia	1	1	2

Final
Real Betis (p)	1 (5)
Valencia	1 (4)

== Round of 32 ==
=== Draw ===
The draw was held on 17 December 2021 in the RFEF headquarters in Las Rozas. The four participant teams of the 2022 Supercopa de España were drawn with the teams from the lowest category. After them, the remaining teams from the lowest categories faced the rest of La Liga teams. Matches were played at stadiums of lower-ranked teams.

Pot 1; 4 participants in 2022 Supercopa de España	Pot 2; 12 teams of La Liga	Pot 3; 11 teams of Segunda División	Pot 4; 4 teams of Primera RFEF	Pot 5; 1 team of Segunda RFEF
Athletic Bilbao; Atlético Madrid; Barcelona; Real Madrid	Cádiz; Celta Vigo; Elche; Espanyol; Mallorca; Osasuna; Rayo Vallecano; Real Betis; Real Sociedad; Sevilla; Valencia; Villarreal	Almería; Cartagena; Eibar; Fuenlabrada; Girona; Leganés; Mirandés; Ponferradina; Sporting Gijón; Valladolid; Zaragoza	Alcoyano; Atlético Baleares; Linares; Rayo Majadahonda	Atlético Mancha Real

=== Matches ===
4 January 2022	Ponferradina (2)	1–1 (a.e.t.) (1–3 p)	Espanyol (1)	Ponferrada
21:00	Yuri 88' (pen.)	Report	Pedrosa 4'	Stadium: El Toralín; Referee: Carlos del Cerro Grande
	Penalties
	Medina (penalty scored); Zalazar (penalty missed); Crespo (penalty missed); Saverio (penalty missed)		(penalty scored) Embarba; (penalty scored) Bare; (penalty scored) Mérida

5 January 2022	Leganés (2)	2–3	Real Sociedad (1)	Leganés
16:00	Muñoz 60', 70'	Report	Isak 8'; Oyarzabal 43', 74' (pen.)	Stadium: Butarque; Referee: Antonio Mateu Lahoz

5 January 2022	Eibar (2)	1–2	Mallorca (1)	Eibar
16:00	Blanco 45'	Report	Gayá 69'; Ángel 82'	Stadium: Ipurua; Referee: Miguel Ángel Ortiz Arias

5 January 2022	Cartagena (2)	1–2	Valencia (1)	Cartagena
16:00	Ortuño 75' (pen.)	Report	Soler 35'; Cheryshev 90+2'	Stadium: Cartagonova; Referee: Pablo González Fuertes

5 January 2022	Linares (3)	1–2	Barcelona (1)	Linares
19:30	Díaz 19'	Report	Dembélé 63'; Jutglà 69'	Stadium: Linarejos; Referee: Guillermo Cuadra Fernández

5 January 2022	Atlético Baleares (3)	2–1	Celta Vigo (1)	Palma
20:00	Martínez 17', 76'	Report	Méndez 67'	Stadium: Estadio Balear; Referee: Mario Melero López

5 January 2022	Mirandés (2)	0–1	Rayo Vallecano (1)	Miranda de Ebro
20:00		Report	Martín 67'	Stadium: Anduva; Referee: José Luis Munuera Montero

5 January 2022	Valladolid (2)	0–3	Real Betis (1)	Valladolid
20:00		Report	Carvalho 24'; Fekir 27'; Iglesias 50'	Stadium: José Zorrilla; Referee: Ricardo de Burgos Bengoetxea

5 January 2022	Alcoyano (3)	1–3	Real Madrid (1)	Alcoy
21:30	Vega 66'	Report	Militão 39'; Asensio 76'; José Juan 78' (o.g.)	Stadium: El Collao; Referee: Adrián Cordero Vega

6 January 2022	Fuenlabrada (2)	0–1	Cádiz (1)	Fuenlabrada
16:00		Report	Alarcón 90+3'	Stadium: Fernando Torres; Referee: Jesús Gil Manzano

6 January 2022	Girona (2)	1–0	Osasuna (1)	Girona
16:00	Juncà 6'	Report		Stadium: Montilivi; Referee: Javier Alberola Rojas

6 January 2022	Sporting Gijón (2)	2–1	Villarreal (1)	Gijón
18:00	Đurđević 67'; Milovanov 88'	Report	Albiol 48'	Stadium: El Molinón; Referee: Alejandro Muñiz Ruiz

6 January 2022	Zaragoza (2)	0–2	Sevilla (1)	Zaragoza
18:00		Report	Koundé 31'; Mir 69'	Stadium: La Romareda; Referee: Valentín Pizarro Gómez

6 January 2022	Atlético Mancha Real (4)	0–2	Athletic Bilbao (1)	Mancha Real
20:00		Report	N. Williams 20', 43'	Stadium: La Juventud; Referee: Juan Martínez Munuera

6 January 2022	Almería (2)	1–2	Elche (1)	Almería
20:00	Ramazani 42'	Report	Piatti 52'; Guti 84'	Stadium: Juegos Mediterráneos; Referee: Alejandro Hernández Hernández

6 January 2022	Rayo Majadahonda (3)	0–5	Atlético Madrid (1)	Madrid (Note: Rayo Majadahonda played its game at Wanda Metropolitano, in Madrid instead of their regular stadium Cerro del Espino in Majadahonda because the Royal Spanish Football Federation have granted permission for a ground change to facilitate more fans at the match.)
21:30		Report	Cunha 17'; Lodi 26'; Suárez 41'; Griezmann 67'; Félix 79'	Stadium: Wanda Metropolitano; Referee: Santiago Jaime Latre

== Round of 16 ==
=== Draw ===
The draw was held on 7 January 2022 in the RFEF headquarters in Las Rozas. Teams are divided into 3 pots according to their division in the 2021–22 season. When possible, matches will be played at the stadiums of lower-ranked teams. Otherwise, the first team drawn plays home. A total of 8 games will be played from 15 to 20 January 2022.

Pot 1; 13 teams of La Liga	Pot 2; 2 teams of Segunda División	Pot 3; 1 team of Primera RFEF
Athletic Bilbao; Atlético Madrid; Barcelona; Cádiz; Elche; Espanyol; Mallorca; Rayo Vallecano; Real Betis; Real Madrid; Real Sociedad; Sevilla; Valencia	Girona; Sporting Gijón	Atlético Baleares

=== Matches ===
15 January 2022	Mallorca (1)	2–1	Espanyol (1)	Palma
16:00	Kubo 32'; Abdón 60'	Report	Puado 62'	Stadium: Visit Mallorca Estadi; Referee: Santiago Jaime Latre

15 January 2022	Sporting Gijón (2)	0–0 (a.e.t.) (2–4 p)	Cádiz (1)	Gijón
18:30		Report		Stadium: El Molinón; Referee: Miguel Ángel Ortiz Arias
	Penalties
	Villalba (penalty missed); Díaz (penalty missed); Kravets (penalty scored); Campuzano (penalty scored)		(penalty scored) Fernández; (penalty scored) Negredo; (penalty scored) Perea; (penalty scored) Arzamendia

15 January 2022	Girona (2)	1–2	Rayo Vallecano (1)	Girona
18:30	Espinosa 26'	Report	Guardiola 45+1', 48'	Stadium: Montilivi; Referee: Adrián Cordero Vega

16 January 2022	Atlético Baleares (3)	0–1	Valencia (1)	Palma
12:00		Report	Marcos André 1'	Stadium: Estadio Balear; Referee: Pablo González Fuertes

16 January 2022 (Note: The match was originally played on 15 January at 21:30, but was suspended in the 40th minute after Sevilla's Joan Jordán was hit in the head by an object thrown from the crowd. The match was resumed the next day at 16:00 behind closed doors.)	Real Betis (1)	2–1	Sevilla (1)	Seville
16:00	Fekir 39'; Canales 73'	Report	Gómez 35'	Stadium: Benito Villamarín; Referee: Ricardo de Burgos Bengoetxea

19 January 2022	Real Sociedad (1)	2–0	Atlético Madrid (1)	San Sebastián
21:00	Januzaj 33'; Sørloth 47'	Report		Stadium: Anoeta; Referee: Javier Alberola Rojas

20 January 2022	Elche (1)	1–2 (a.e.t.)	Real Madrid (1)	Elche
19:00	Verdú 103'	Report	Isco 108'; Hazard 116'	Stadium: Martínez Valero; Referee: Jorge Figueroa Vázquez

20 January 2022	Athletic Bilbao (1)	3–2 (a.e.t.)	Barcelona (1)	Bilbao
21:30	Muniain 2', 105+1' (pen.); Martínez 86'	Report	Torres 20'; Pedri 90+3'	Stadium: San Mamés; Referee: José Luis Munuera Montero

== Quarter-finals ==
=== Draw ===
The draw was held on 21 January 2022 in the RFEF headquarters in Las Rozas. As there are no teams from the lower divisions, home teams were selected by a draw.

Qualified teams
8 teams of La Liga

Athletic Bilbao
Cádiz
Mallorca
Rayo Vallecano
Real Betis
Real Madrid
Real Sociedad
Valencia

=== Matches ===
2 February 2022	Rayo Vallecano (1)	1–0	Mallorca (1)	Madrid
20:00	Trejo 44' (pen.)	Report		Stadium: Vallecas; Referee: César Soto Grado

2 February 2022	Valencia (1)	2–1	Cádiz (1)	Valencia
21:00	Guedes 24'; Duro 79'	Report	Pérez 54' (pen.)	Stadium: Mestalla; Referee: Javier Alberola Rojas

3 February 2022	Real Sociedad (1)	0–4	Real Betis (1)	San Sebastián
20:00		Report	Juanmi 12', 57'; Willian José 83' (pen.); Ruibal 87'	Stadium: Anoeta; Referee: Juan Martínez Munuera

3 February 2022	Athletic Bilbao (1)	1–0	Real Madrid (1)	Bilbao
21:30	Berenguer 89'	Report		Stadium: San Mamés; Referee: Jesús Gil Manzano

== Semi-finals ==
=== Draw ===
The draw for the semi-finals was held on 4 February 2022 in the RFEF headquarters in Las Rozas.

Qualified teams
4 teams of La Liga

Athletic Bilbao
Rayo Vallecano
Real Betis
Valencia

=== Summary ===
Team 1	Agg.	Team 2	1st leg	2nd leg
Rayo Vallecano (1)	2–3	Real Betis (1)	1–2	1–1
Athletic Bilbao (1)	1–2	Valencia (1)	1–1	0–1

=== Matches ===
9 February 2022
21:00

Rayo Vallecano	1–2	Real Betis
Á. García 5'	Report	Iglesias 26'; Carvalho 68'

Campo de Fútbol de Vallecas, Madrid
Attendance: 9,034
Referee: José María Sánchez Martínez
3 March 2022
21:00

Real Betis	1–1	Rayo Vallecano
Iglesias 90+2'	Report	Bebé 80'

Benito Villamarín, Seville
Attendance: 50,916
Referee: Juan Martínez Munuera

Real Betis won 3–2 on aggregate.

10 February 2022
21:30

Athletic Bilbao	1–1	Valencia
R. García 37'	Report	Duro 65'

San Mamés, Bilbao
Attendance: 42,906
Referee: José Luis Munuera Montero
2 March 2022
21:30

Valencia	1–0	Athletic Bilbao
Guedes 43'	Report

Mestalla, Valencia
Attendance: 41,731
Referee: Jesús Gil Manzano

Valencia won 2–1 on aggregate.

== Final ==
23 April 2022
22:00 CEST

Real Betis	1–1 (a.e.t.)	Valencia
Iglesias 11'	Report	Duro 30'
Penalties
Willian José (penalty scored); Joaquín (penalty scored); Guardado (penalty scored); Tello (penalty scored); Miranda (penalty scored)	5–4	(penalty scored) Soler; (penalty scored) Račić; (penalty scored) Guedes; (penalty missed) Musah; (penalty scored) Gayà

La Cartuja, Seville
Attendance: 53,387
Referee: Alejandro Hernández Hernández (Las Palmas)

== Top scorers ==
Rank	Player	Club	Goals
1	(Spain) Borja Iglesias	Real Betis	5
2	(Spain) Ángel Rodríguez	Mallorca	4
2	(Spain) Alfredo Ortuño	Cartagena	4
2	(Spain) Dani Gómez	Levante	4
5	(Spain) Mikel Oyarzabal	Real Sociedad	3
5	(Spain) Álvaro Negredo	Cádiz	3
5	(Spain) Loren Morón	Espanyol	3
5	(Spain) Manel Martínez	Atlético Baleares	3
5	(Spain) Alejandro Marqués	Mirandés	3
5	(Spain) Paco Alcácer	Villarreal	3
5	(Morocco) Mourad Daoudi	Alcoyano	3
5	(Spain) Riki	San Agustín del Guadalix	3
5	(Spain) Jaime Mata	Getafe	3
5	(Spain) Adrián Butzke	Granada	3
5	(Spain) Alejandro Blesa	Levante	3
5	(Spain) Roberto Soldado	Levante	3
