= Alessio Lisci =

Italian football manager (born 1985)

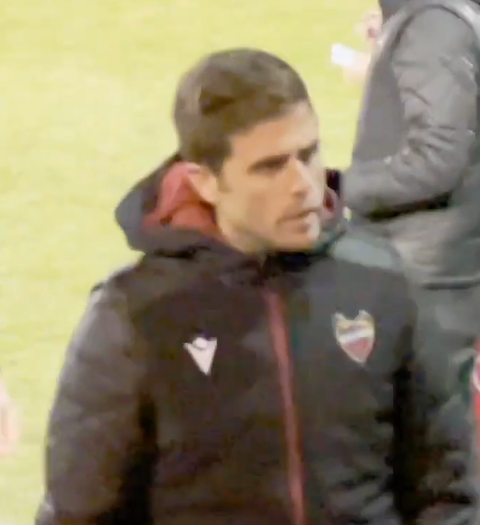
- Lisci managing Levante in 2021

Personal information
- Full name: Alessio Lisci
- Date of birth: 4 November 1985 (age 41)
- Place of birth: Rome, Italy

Team information
- Current team: PAOK (manager)

Senior career*
Years	Team	Apps	(Gls)
2005–2007	Guidonia		

Managerial career
- 2020–2021: Levante B
- 2021–2022: Levante
- 2023–2025: Mirandés
- 2025–2026: Osasuna
- 2026–: PAOK
- * Club domestic league appearances and goals

Alessio Lisci (born 4 November 1985) is an Italian football manager and former player who is currently the manager of Super League Greece club PAOK.

== Career ==
=== Early career ===
Born in Rome, Lisci played mainly for Promozione sides, and notably represented Serie D side Guidonia during his senior career. After retiring, he started working at Lazio as a fitness coach for the youth sides.

=== Levante ===
Lisci successively applied for youth coaching jobs at a number of Spanish clubs in 2011; Atlético Madrid and Levante were the only two offering him a position, with Lisci accepting the latter after Atleti only offered him an eight-a-side football job. He started as an assistant for the Juvenil A side while managing an eight-a-side football team; in his first two years at Levante, he worked also as a representative in the Italian food trading market in Valencia as a second job.

Lisci left Levante in 2016 when manager Miguel Ángel Villafaina was sacked, but returned just months later after being named in charge of the Juvenil B side. On 12 June 2018, he was named as manager of Levante's Juvenil A squad.

On 15 December 2020, Lisci replaced Luis Tevenet at the helm of the reserves in the Segunda División B. He managed to avoid relegation with the side at the end of the season, as the club was kept in Segunda División RFEF.

On 1 December 2021, Lisci was appointed as interim manager of the first team in La Liga, after manager Javier Pereira was sacked. He made his debut at the helm of the club in the following day, in a 8–0 away routing of Huracán Melilla, for the season's Copa del Rey.

Lisci's professional debut occurred on 5 December 2021, a 0–0 home draw against Osasuna. Two days later, he was appointed as manager of the Granotas until the end of the campaign.

Despite taking over the Granotes in the last position, Lisci kept his side with options of survival until the last rounds, when the club's relegation was confirmed. On 30 June 2022, after his contract expired and Levante announced Mehdi Nafti as the new manager, he left after refusing the role of Methodology Director, stating a "desire to manage".

=== Mirandés ===
On 8 June 2023, after nearly one year without coaching, Lisci was named as manager of Segunda División side Mirandés. He narrowly avoided relegation in his first season, but led the club to the finals of the play-offs in his second.

On 23 June 2025, Lisci left the Jabatos.

=== Osasuna ===
Hours after leaving Mirandés, Lisci was announced as manager of Osasuna in the top tier on a two-year deal. He departed the club on 25 May 2026, after narrowly avoiding relegation.

=== PAOK ===
On 22 June 2026, Lisci was announced as the new head coach of Super League Greece club PAOK.

== Managerial statistics ==
As of match played 22 November 2026

Managerial record by team and tenure
Team	Nat	From	To	Record								Ref
Team	Nat	From	To	G	W	D	L	GF	GA	GD	Win %	Ref
Levante B	(Spain)	15 December 2020	29 November 2021	31	12	8	11	33	26	+7	38.71	
Levante	(Spain)	29 November 2021	12 June 2022	25	9	5	11	49	51	−2	36.00	
Mirandés	(Spain)	8 June 2023	23 June 2025	91	37	23	31	118	107	+11	40.66	
Osasuna	(Spain)	23 June 2025	25 May 2026	42	14	10	18	60	57	+3	33.33	
PAOK	(Greece)	22 June 2026	present	20	11	3	6	37	24	+13	55.00	
Total				209	83	49	77	297	265	+32	39.71	—
