= CD Villa de Fortuna =

Association football club in Spain

Villa de Fortuna
- Full name: Club Deportivo Villa de Fortuna
- Founded: 2015; 11 years ago
- Ground: José Luis Belda
- Capacity: 1,000
- Chairman: Saúl Pereira
- Manager: Emilio López
- League: Primera Autonómica – Group 2
- 2025–26: Segunda Autonómica – Group 2, 3rd of 13 (promoted)
Home colours	Away colours

Club Deportivo Villa de Fortuna is a Spanish football club based in Fortuna, in the Region of Murcia. Founded in 2015, they play in Primera Autonómica – Group 2, holding home games at the Complejo Municipal Fortuna José Luis Belda, with a capacity of 1,000 people.

== History ==
Founded in 2015 to replace absorbed PMD Fortuna in the city, Villa de Fortuna started playing in the Segunda Autonómica, the lowest tier of Murcian football, and achieved immediate promotion as champions. Another promotion followed in 2018, after the club finished third in the Primera Autonómica.

Villa de Fortuna subsequently established themselves in the Preferente Autonómica, reaching the final of the promotion play-offs in 2020–21 but losing to CD Bala Azul; the club still qualified to the 2021–22 Copa del Rey, knocking out CA Espeleño in the preliminary rounds but being subsequently eliminated by Cádiz CF in the first round.

== Season to season ==
Season	Tier	Division	Place	Copa del Rey
2015–16	7	2ª Aut.	1st	
2016–17	6	1ª Aut.	5th	
2017–18	6	1ª Aut.	3rd	
2018–19	5	Pref. Aut.	13th	
2019–20	5	Pref. Aut.	9th	
2020–21	5	Pref. Aut.	2nd	
2021–22	6	Pref. Aut.	4th	First round
2022–23	6	Pref. Aut.	10th	
2023–24	7	1ª Aut.	15th	
2024–25	DNP			
2025–26	8	2ª Aut.		
