= Zanelli =

- Language: Italian

Origin
- Region of origin: Italy

Zanelli is an Italian surname. Notable people with the surname include:

- Angelo Zanelli (1879–1942), Italian sculptor
- Geoff Zanelli (born 1974), American composer
- Juan Zanelli (1906–1944), Chilean racing driver
- Renan Zanelli (born 1992), Brazilian footballer
- Renato Zanelli (1892–1935), Chilean opera singer
