= Borja Estepa =

Spanish footballer

Personal information
- Full name: Borja Estepa Muñoz
- Date of birth: 24 May 1999 (age 27)
- Place of birth: Córdoba, Spain
- Position: Attacking midfielder

Team information
- Current team: Córdoba B

Youth career
- 2007–2017: Córdoba

Senior career*
Years	Team	Apps	(Gls)
2016–	Córdoba B	26	(0)
2017	Córdoba	0	(0)
2019	→ Atlético Espeleño (loan)	16	(0)
- * Club domestic league appearances and goals as of 19 May 2019

Borja Estepa Muñoz (born 24 May 1999) is a Spanish footballer who plays for Córdoba CF B as an attacking midfielder.

== Club career ==
Born in Córdoba, Andalusia, Estepa joined Córdoba CF in 2007, aged eight. He made his senior debut with the reserves on 20 August 2016, coming on as a late substitute for Moha Traoré in a 2–0 Segunda División B away win against San Fernando CD.

On 31 August 2016, Estepa renewed his contract until 2020. On 6 September of the following year he made his first team debut, starting in a 4–2 win at Lorca FC for the season's Copa del Rey.

On 31 January 2019, Estepa was loaned to Tercera División side CA Espeleño until June.
