= 2021–22 La Liga =

91st season of La Liga

La Liga
- Season: 2021–22
- Dates: 13 August 2021 – 22 May 2022
- Champions: Real Madrid; 35th title
- Relegated: Granada; Levante; Alavés
- Champions League: Real Madrid; Barcelona; Atlético Madrid; Sevilla
- Europa League: Real Betis; Real Sociedad
- Europa Conference League: Villarreal
- Matches: 380
- Goals: 951 (2.5 per match)
- Best player: Karim Benzema
- Top goalscorer: Karim Benzema (27 goals)
- Best goalkeeper: Yassine Bounou (0.77 goals/match)
- Biggest home win: Real Madrid 6–0 Levante (12 May 2022)
- Biggest away win: Mallorca 2–6 Granada (7 May 2022); Rayo Vallecano 1–5 Villarreal (12 May 2022)
- Highest scoring: Sevilla 5–3 Levante (24 October 2021); Mallorca 2–6 Granada (7 May 2022)
- Longest winning run: Barcelona; Real Madrid (7 matches)
- Longest unbeaten run: Barcelona; Sevilla (15 matches)
- Longest winless run: Levante (19 matches)
- Longest losing run: Getafe; Mallorca (7 matches)
- Highest attendance: 86,422; Barcelona 1–2 Real Madrid (24 October 2021)
- Lowest attendance: 583; Rayo Vallecano 4–0 Granada (29 August 2021)
- Total attendance: 8,675,104
- Average attendance: 22,829

The 2021–22 La Liga, also known as La Liga Santander due to sponsorship reasons, was the 91st season of La Liga, Spain's premier football competition. It began on 13 August 2021 and concluded on 22 May 2022. The fixtures were announced on 30 June 2021.

On 24 June 2021, the Spanish Council of Ministers resolved that spectators could return to stadiums at full capacity by means of a modification of the royal decree regulating the 'new normality', in the context of the COVID-19 pandemic.

Atlético Madrid were the defending champions, having won their eleventh title the previous season. Espanyol, Mallorca and Rayo Vallecano joined as the promoted clubs from the 2020–21 Segunda División. They replaced Huesca, Valladolid and Eibar, which were relegated to Segunda the previous season.

Real Madrid secured a record-extending 35th title with four matches to spare on 30 April, following a 4–0 victory over Espanyol.

This was the first La Liga season since 2003–04 that did not feature the league's all-time top goal scorer Lionel Messi and long time Real Madrid player and captain Sergio Ramos, who both departed for Paris Saint-Germain in the summer.

== Teams ==
=== Promotion and relegation (pre-season) ===
A total of twenty teams contested the league, including seventeen sides from the 2020–21 season and three promoted from the 2020–21 Segunda División. This included the two top teams from the Segunda División, and the winners of the promotion play-offs.

Teams relegated to Segunda División

The first team to be relegated from La Liga were Eibar, after a 1–4 loss to Valencia on 16 May 2021, ending their seven-year stay in the top tier. The second team to be relegated were Valladolid, following a 1–2 home defeat against Atlético Madrid on 22 May 2021, in their final game of the season, ending their three-year stay in the top tier. The third and final team to be relegated were Huesca, after drawing 0–0 against Valencia on 22 May 2021 in their final game of the season, suffering an immediate return to the second division.

Teams promoted from Segunda División

On 8 May 2021, Espanyol became the first side to mathematically be promoted, assured of a return to the top flight following a 0–0 draw against Zaragoza. The second team to earn promotion was Mallorca, following Almería's 2–3 loss to Cartagena on 18 May 2021. Both teams made an immediate return to the first division after a season away. The third and final team to be promoted were Rayo Vallecano, after winning the play-off final 3–2 against Girona on 20 June 2021, returning after a two-year absence.

=== Stadiums and locations ===
Location of teams in 2021–22 La Liga
Location of Community of Madrid teams in 2021–22 La Liga

Team	Location	Stadium	Capacity
Alavés	Vitoria-Gasteiz	Mendizorroza	19,840
Athletic Bilbao	Bilbao	San Mamés	53,289
Atlético Madrid	Madrid	Wanda Metropolitano	68,456
Barcelona	Barcelona	Camp Nou	99,354
Cádiz	Cádiz	Nuevo Mirandilla	20,724
Celta Vigo	Vigo	Abanca-Balaídos	29,000
Elche	Elche	Martínez Valero	33,732
Espanyol	Barcelona	RCDE Stadium	40,000
Getafe	Getafe	Coliseum Alfonso Pérez	17,393
Granada	Granada	Nuevo Los Cármenes	19,336
Levante	Valencia	Ciutat de València	26,354
Mallorca	Palma	Visit Mallorca Estadi	24,262
Osasuna	Pamplona	El Sadar	23,576
Rayo Vallecano	Madrid	Vallecas	14,708
Real Betis	Seville	Benito Villamarín	60,721
Real Madrid	Madrid	Santiago Bernabéu	81,044
Real Sociedad	San Sebastián	Anoeta	39,500
Sevilla	Seville	Ramón Sánchez Pizjuán	43,883
Valencia	Valencia	Mestalla	55,000
Villarreal	Villarreal	Estadio de la Cerámica	24,890

=== Personnel and sponsorship ===
Team	Manager	Captain	Kit manufacturer	Kit sponsor(s)
Alavés	(Spain) Julio Velázquez	(Spain) Víctor Laguardia	Kelme	Zøtapay, XM^{1}, Integra Energía^{2}, Silken Hoteles^{3}, InnJoo^{3}
Athletic Bilbao	(Spain) Marcelino	(Spain) Iker Muniain	New Balance	Kutxabank
Atlético Madrid	(Argentina) Diego Simeone	(Spain) Koke	Νike	Plus500, Ria Money Transfer,^{1} Hyundai^{2}
Barcelona	(Spain) Xavi	(Spain) Sergio Busquets	Nike	Rakuten, UNICEF^{1}
Cádiz	(Spain) Sergio	(Spain) José Mari	Macron	Bitci, Jobchain,^{1} Floki Inu^{2}
Celta Vigo	(Argentina) Eduardo Coudet	(Spain) Hugo Mallo	Adidas	Estrella Galicia 0,0, Abanca,^{1} AIX Investment Group,^{2} Grupo Recalvi^{3}
Elche	(Spain) Francisco	(Spain) Gonzalo Verdú	Νike	TM Grupo Inmobiliario, Sfidante^{1}
Espanyol	(Spain) Luis Blanco	(Spain) David López	Kelme	Riviera Maya, Digi Communications,^{1} Reale Seguros,^{2} Global Racing Oil^{3}
Getafe	(Spain) Quique Sánchez Flores	(Togo) Djené	Joma	Tecnocasa Group
Granada	(Spain) Aitor Karanka	(Spain) Víctor Díaz	Νike	Platzi, Caja Rural Granada^{1}
Levante	(Italy) Alessio Lisci	(Spain) José Luis Morales	Macron	Gedesco, Baleària,^{1} Sesderma^{1}
Mallorca	(Mexico) Javier Aguirre	(Spain) Manolo Reina	Nike	αGEL, Alua Hotels & Resorts,^{1} Juaneda,^{1} OK Mobility,^{2} Air Europa,^{3} Specialized^{3}
Osasuna	(Spain) Jagoba Arrasate	(Spain) Oier Sanjurjo	Adidas	Verleal, Clínica Universidad de Navarra^{3}
Rayo Vallecano	(Spain) Andoni Iraola	(Argentina) Óscar Trejo	Umbro	Digi Communications
Real Betis	(Chile) Manuel Pellegrini	(Spain) Joaquín	Kappa	Finetwork, LegacyFX,^{1} Reale Seguros,^{2} MuchBetter^{3}
Real Madrid	(Italy) Carlo Ancelotti	(Brazil) Marcelo	Adidas	Emirates
Real Sociedad	(Spain) Imanol Alguacil	(Spain) Asier Illarramendi	Macron	Finetwork, Kutxabank,^{1} Reale Seguros^{2}
Sevilla	(Spain) Julen Lopetegui	(Spain) Jesús Navas	Νike	NAGA, Socios.com,^{1}^{3} Valvoline^{2}
Valencia	(Spain) José Bordalás	(Spain) José Gayà	Puma	Socios.com, Samtrade FX,^{1} Sailun Tyres,^{2} Škoda^{3}
Villarreal	(Spain) Unai Emery	(Spain) Mario Gaspar	Joma	Pamesa Cerámica, Color Star Technology^{2}

1. On the back of shirt.
2. On the sleeves.
3. On the shorts.

=== Managerial changes ===
Team	Outgoing manager	Manner of departure	Date of vacancy	Position in table	Incoming manager	Date of appointment
Valencia	(Spain) Voro	End of interim spell	22 May 2021	Pre-season	(Spain) José Bordalás	27 May 2021
Getafe	(Spain) José Bordalás	Mutual consent	26 May 2021	Pre-season	(Spain) Míchel	27 May 2021
Real Madrid	(France) Zinedine Zidane	Resigned	27 May 2021	Pre-season	(Italy) Carlo Ancelotti	1 June 2021
Granada	(Spain) Diego Martínez	Resigned	27 May 2021	Pre-season	(Spain) Robert Moreno	18 June 2021
Levante	(Spain) Paco López	Sacked	3 October 2021	18th	(Spain) Javier Pereira	7 October 2021
Getafe	(Spain) Míchel	Sacked	4 October 2021	20th	(Spain) Quique Sánchez Flores	6 October 2021
Barcelona	(Netherlands) Ronald Koeman	Sacked	27 October 2021	9th	(Spain) Xavi	5 November 2021
Elche	(Spain) Fran Escribá	Sacked	21 November 2021	18th	(Spain) Francisco	28 November 2021
Levante	(Spain) Javier Pereira	Sacked	29 November 2021	20th	(Italy) Alessio Lisci	7 December 2021
Alavés	(Spain) Javier Calleja	Sacked	28 December 2021	18th	(Spain) José Luis Mendilibar	28 December 2021
Cádiz	(Spain) Álvaro Cervera	Sacked	11 January 2022	19th	(Spain) Sergio	11 January 2022
Granada	(Spain) Robert Moreno	Sacked	6 March 2022	17th	(Spain) Rubén Torrecilla (caretaker)	6 March 2022
Mallorca	(Spain) Luis García	Sacked	22 March 2022	18th	(Mexico) Javier Aguirre	24 March 2022
Alavés	(Spain) José Luis Mendilibar	Sacked	3 April 2022	20th	(Spain) Julio Velázquez	5 April 2022
Granada	(Spain) Rubén Torrecilla	End of caretaker spell	18 April 2022	18th	(Spain) Aitor Karanka	18 April 2022
Espanyol	(Spain) Vicente Moreno	Sacked	13 May 2022	13th	(Spain) Luis Blanco (caretaker)	13 May 2022

== League table ==
Pos	Team	Pld	W	D	L	GF	GA	GD	Pts	Qualification or relegation
1	Real Madrid (C)	38	26	8	4	80	31	+49	86	Qualification for the Champions League group stage
2	Barcelona	38	21	10	7	68	38	+30	73	Qualification for the Champions League group stage
3	Atlético Madrid	38	21	8	9	65	43	+22	71	Qualification for the Champions League group stage
4	Sevilla	38	18	16	4	53	30	+23	70	Qualification for the Champions League group stage
5	Real Betis	38	19	8	11	62	40	+22	65	Qualification for the Europa League group stage (Note: Since the winners of the 2021–22 Copa del Rey, Real Betis, qualified for European competition based on league position, the Europa League berth awarded to the Copa del Rey winners was passed to the sixth-placed team, and the Europa Conference League berth awarded to the sixth-placed team was passed to the seventh-placed team.)
6	Real Sociedad	38	17	11	10	40	37	+3	62	Qualification for the Europa League group stage
7	Villarreal	38	16	11	11	63	37	+26	59	Qualification for the Europa Conference League play-off round
8	Athletic Bilbao	38	14	13	11	43	36	+7	55	
9	Valencia	38	11	15	12	48	53	−5	48	
10	Osasuna	38	12	11	15	37	51	−14	47	
11	Celta Vigo	38	12	10	16	43	43	0	46	
12	Rayo Vallecano	38	11	9	18	39	50	−11	42 (Note: Head-to-head points: Rayo Vallecano 9, Elche 7, Espanyol 1.)	
13	Elche	38	11	9	18	40	52	−12	42	
14	Espanyol	38	10	12	16	40	53	−13	42	
15	Getafe	38	8	15	15	33	41	−8	39 (Note: Head-to-head points: Getafe 8, Mallorca 5, Cádiz 2.)	
16	Mallorca	38	10	9	19	36	63	−27	39	
17	Cádiz	38	8	15	15	35	51	−16	39	
18	Granada (R)	38	8	14	16	44	61	−17	38	Relegation to Segunda División
19	Levante (R)	38	8	11	19	51	76	−25	35	Relegation to Segunda División
20	Alavés (R)	38	8	7	23	31	65	−34	31	Relegation to Segunda División

Source: LaLiga Santander
Rules for classification: 1) Points; 2) Head-to-head points; 3) Head-to-head goal difference; 4) Goal difference; 5) Goals scored; 6) Fair-play points (Note: Head-to-head record is used only after all the matches between the teams in question have been played)
(C) Champions; (R) Relegated

== Results ==
Home \ Away	RMA	BAR	ATM	SEV	BET	RSO	VIL	ATH	VAL	OSA	CEL	RAY	ELC	ESP	GET	MLL	CAD	GRA	LEV	ALA
Real Madrid	—	0–4	2–0	2–1	0–0	4–1	0–0	1–0	4–1	0–0	5–2	2–1	2–2	4–0	2–0	6–1	0–0	1–0	6–0	3–0
Barcelona	1–2	—	4–2	1–0	0–1	4–2	0–2	4–0	3–1	4–0	3–1	0–1	3–2	1–0	2–1	2–1	0–1	1–1	3–0	1–1
Atlético Madrid	1–0	2–0	—	1–1	3–0	2–2	2–2	0–0	3–2	1–0	2–0	2–0	1–0	2–1	4–3	1–2	2–1	0–0	0–1	4–1
Sevilla	2–3	1–1	2–1	—	2–1	0–0	1–0	1–0	3–1	2–0	2–2	3–0	2–0	2–0	1–0	0–0	1–1	4–2	5–3	2–2
Real Betis	0–1	1–2	1–3	0–2	—	4–0	0–2	1–0	4–1	4–1	0–2	3–2	0–1	2–2	2–0	2–1	1–1	2–0	3–1	4–0
Real Sociedad	0–2	0–1	1–2	0–0	0–0	—	1–3	1–1	0–0	1–0	1–0	1–0	1–0	1–0	0–0	1–0	3–0	2–0	1–0	1–0
Villarreal	0–0	1–3	2–2	1–1	2–0	1–2	—	1–1	2–0	1–2	1–0	2–0	4–1	5–1	1–0	3–0	3–3	0–0	5–0	5–2
Athletic Bilbao	1–2	1–1	2–0	0–1	3–2	4–0	2–1	—	0–0	2–0	0–2	1–2	2–1	2–1	1–1	2–0	0–1	2–2	3–1	1–0
Valencia	1–2	1–4	3–3	1–1	0–3	0–0	2–0	1–1	—	1–2	2–0	1–1	2–1	1–2	1–0	2–2	0–0	3–1	1–1	3–0
Osasuna	1–3	2–2	0–3	0–0	1–3	0–2	1–0	1–3	1–4	—	0–0	1–0	1–1	0–0	1–1	0–2	2–0	1–1	3–1	1–0
Celta Vigo	1–2	3–3	1–2	0–1	0–0	0–2	1–1	0–1	1–2	2–0	—	2–0	1–0	3–1	0–2	4–3	1–2	1–0	1–1	4–0
Rayo Vallecano	0–1	1–0	0–1	1–1	1–1	1–1	1–5	0–1	1–1	0–3	0–0	—	2–1	1–0	3–0	3–1	3–1	4–0	2–4	2–0
Elche	1–2	1–2	0–2	1–1	0–3	1–2	1–0	0–0	0–1	1–1	1–0	2–1	—	2–2	3–1	3–0	3–1	0–0	1–1	3–1
Espanyol	2–1	2–2	1–2	1–1	1–4	1–0	0–0	1–1	1–1	1–1	1–0	0–1	1–2	—	2–0	1–0	2–0	2–0	4–3	1–0
Getafe	1–0	0–0	1–2	0–1	0–0	1–1	1–2	0–0	0–0	1–0	0–3	0–0	0–1	2–1	—	1–0	4–0	4–2	3–0	2–2
Mallorca	0–3	0–1	1–0	1–1	1–1	0–2	0–0	3–2	0–1	2–3	0–0	2–1	2–2	1–0	0–0	—	2–1	2–6	1–0	2–1
Cádiz	1–1	0–0	1–4	0–1	1–2	0–2	1–0	2–3	0–0	2–3	0–0	2–0	3–0	2–2	1–1	1–1	—	1–1	1–1	0–2
Granada	1–4	1–1	2–1	1–0	1–2	2–3	1–4	1–0	1–1	0–2	1–1	2–2	0–1	0–0	1–1	4–1	0–0	—	1–4	2–1
Levante	3–3	2–3	2–2	2–3	2–4	2–1	2–0	0–0	3–4	0–0	0–2	1–1	3–0	1–1	0–0	2–0	0–2	0–3	—	3–1
Alavés	1–4	0–1	1–0	0–0	0–1	1–1	2–1	0–0	2–1	0–2	1–2	1–0	1–0	2–1	1–1	0–1	0–1	2–3	2–1	—

Source: La Liga
Legend: Blue = home team win; Yellow = draw; Red = away team win.
For upcoming matches, an "a" indicates there is an article about the rivalry between the two participants.

== Season statistics ==
=== Scoring ===
- First goal of the season:
  (Spain) Carlos Soler for Valencia against Getafe (13 August 2021)
- Last goal of the season:
  (Spain) Jon Guridi for Real Sociedad against Atlético Madrid (22 May 2022)

=== Top goalscorers ===
Rank	Player	Club	Goals
1	(France) Karim Benzema	Real Madrid	27
2	(Spain) Iago Aspas	Celta Vigo	18
3	(Spain) Raúl de Tomás	Espanyol	17
3	(Brazil) Vinícius Júnior	Real Madrid	17
5	(Spain) Juanmi	Real Betis	16
5	(Turkey) Enes Ünal	Getafe	16
7	(Spain) Joselu	Alavés	14
8	(Spain) José Luis Morales	Levante	13
9	(Argentina) Ángel Correa	Atlético Madrid	12
9	(Netherlands) Memphis Depay	Barcelona	12

=== Top assists ===
Rank	Player	Club	Assists
1	(France) Ousmane Dembélé	Barcelona	13
2	(France) Karim Benzema	Real Madrid	12
3	(Spain) Jordi Alba	Barcelona	10
3	(Spain) Iker Muniain	Athletic Bilbao	10
3	(Spain) Dani Parejo	Villarreal	10
3	(Brazil) Vinícius Júnior	Real Madrid	10
7	(Spain) Sergi Darder	Espanyol	9
7	(Argentina) Óscar Trejo	Rayo Vallecano	9
9	(France) Nabil Fekir	Real Betis	8
9	(Croatia) Luka Modrić	Real Madrid	8

=== Zamora Trophy ===
The Zamora Trophy was awarded by newspaper Marca to the goalkeeper with the lowest goals-to-games ratio. A goalkeeper had to have played at least 28 games of 60 or more minutes to be eligible for the trophy.

Rank	Player	Club	Goals against	Matches	Average
1	(Morocco) Yassine Bounou	Sevilla	24	31	0.77
2	(Belgium) Thibaut Courtois	Real Madrid	29	36	0.81
3	(Argentina) Gerónimo Rulli	Villarreal	28	32	0.88
4	(Spain) Álex Remiro	Real Sociedad	32	35	0.91
4	(Spain) Unai Simón	Athletic Bilbao	31	34	0.91

=== Hat-tricks ===
Player	For	Against	Result	Date	Round
(France) Karim Benzema	Real Madrid	Celta Vigo	5–2 (H)	12 September 2021	4
(Spain) Marco Asensio	Real Madrid	Mallorca	6–1 (H)	22 September 2021	6
(Honduras) Anthony Lozano	Cádiz	Villarreal	3–3 (A)	26 October 2021	11
(Spain) Juanmi	Real Betis	Levante	3–1 (H)	28 November 2021	15
(Spain) Jorge Molina	Granada	Mallorca	4–1 (H)	19 December 2021	18
(Spain) Oihan Sancet	Athletic Bilbao	Osasuna	3–1 (A)	3 January 2022	19
(Netherlands) Arnaut Danjuma	Villarreal	Granada	4–1 (A)	19 February 2022	25
(Gabon) Pierre-Emerick Aubameyang	Barcelona	Valencia	4–1 (A)	20 February 2022	25
(Spain) Yeremy Pino^{4}	Villarreal	Espanyol	5–1 (H)	27 February 2022	26
(Brazil) Vinícius Júnior	Real Madrid	Levante	6–0 (H)	12 May 2022	36

^{4} – Player scored four goals.

=== Discipline ===
==== Player ====
- Most yellow cards: 15
  - (Paraguay) Omar Alderete (Valencia)
- Most red cards: 2
  - (Spain) Jorge Cuenca (Getafe)
  - (Spain) Raúl de Tomás (Espanyol)
  - (Spain) José Gayà (Valencia)
  - (Spain) Hugo Guillamón (Valencia)
  - (Central African Republic) Geoffrey Kondogbia (Atlético Madrid)
  - (France) Jules Koundé (Sevilla)
  - (Spain) Hugo Mallo (Celta Vigo)
  - (Spain) Iñigo Martínez (Athletic Bilbao)
  - (Argentina) Franco Russo (Mallorca)
  - (Spain) Roberto Soldado (Levante)
  - (Spain) Mikel Vesga (Athletic Bilbao)

==== Team ====
- Most yellow cards: 123
  - Valencia
- Most red cards: 8
  - Getafe
  - Valencia
- Fewest yellow cards: 76
  - Real Madrid
  - Real Sociedad
- Fewest red cards: 0
  - Real Madrid

== Awards ==
=== Player of the Season ===
Pos.	Player	Club	Ref.
ST	(France) Karim Benzema	Real Madrid	

=== Monthly ===
Month	Player of the Month		Reference
Month	Player	Club	Reference
September	(France) Karim Benzema	Real Madrid	
October	(France) Robin Le Normand	Real Sociedad	
November	(Brazil) Vinícius Júnior	Real Madrid	
December	(Spain) Juanmi	Real Betis	
January	(Argentina) Ángel Correa	Atlético Madrid	
February	(Belgium) Thibaut Courtois	Real Madrid	
March	(Portugal) João Félix	Atlético Madrid	
April	(France) Karim Benzema	Real Madrid	
May	(Kosovo) Vedat Muriqi	Mallorca	

=== Team of the Season ===
Team of the Season
Goalkeeper	(Belgium) Thibaut Courtois (Real Madrid)				
Defenders	(Argentina) Marcos Acuña (Sevilla)	(Austria) David Alaba (Real Madrid)	(France) Jules Koundé (Sevilla)	(Brazil) Éder Militão (Real Madrid)	(Uruguay) Ronald Araújo (Barcelona)
Midfielders	(Spain) Sergio Canales (Real Betis)	(France) Nabil Fekir (Real Betis)	(Croatia) Luka Modrić (Real Madrid)	(Spain) Iker Muniain (Athletic Bilbao)	(Spain) Pedri (Barcelona)
Forwards	(France) Karim Benzema (Real Madrid)		(Spain) Raúl de Tomás (Espanyol)	(Portugal) João Félix (Atlético Madrid)	(Brazil) Vinícius Júnior (Real Madrid)

== Attendance to stadiums ==
=== Restrictions ===
Due to the COVID-19 pandemic, clubs were not allowed to use the total capacity of their stadiums. According to the progress of the pandemic, the capacity allowed each month was decided by the Government of Spain, in agreement with the Autonomous Communities.

- August (rounds 1 to 3): 40% of capacity allowed. Additionally, the Basque Country reduced it to 20%, Catalonia to 30% and the Valencian Community limited the attendance to a maximum of 15,000 spectators, always respecting the agreement.
- September (rounds 4 to 7): 60% of capacity allowed. The Basque Country raised its own limit to 30%, while Catalonia did to 40%.
- October (rounds 8 to 12): full capacity allowed, except for Catalonia and Basque Country, whose governments limited the attendance to 60%.

=== Average attendances ===
Pos	Team	Total	High	Low	Average	Change
1	Barcelona	1,025,652	86,422	20,384	53,982	n/a
2	Atlético Madrid	887,840	63,874	24,926	46,728	n/a
3	Real Betis	792,593	52,158	22,590	41,715	n/a
4	Real Madrid	783,338	60,017	19,874	41,228	n/a^{1}
5	Athletic Bilbao	625,976	43,398	9,394	32,946	n/a
6	Sevilla	565,355	40,629	13,962	29,756	n/a
7	Valencia	519,638	38,315	9,868	27,349	n/a
8	Real Sociedad	509,715	37,066	7,652	26,827	n/a
9	Espanyol	318,791	25,049	11,095	16,778	n/a
10	Osasuna	318,314	21,741	6,175	16,753	n/a
11	Elche	301,090	23,010	9,145	15,847	n/a
12	Levante	284,260	20,785	9,838	14,961	n/a
13	Villarreal	271,570	19,050	7,837	14,293	n/a
14	Cádiz	267,048	19,643	6,941	14,055	n/a
15	Granada	254,230	17,951	6,267	13,381	n/a
16	Mallorca	236,246	18,466	6,279	12,434	n/a
17	Alavés	205,190	16,209	2,896	10,799	n/a
18	Celta Vigo	190,257	15,714	5,401	10,014	n/a^{1}
19	Getafe	165,341	13,072	4,810	8,702	n/a
20	Rayo Vallecano	152,660	11,879	583	8,035	n/a^{1}
	League total	8,675,104	86,422	583	22,829	n/a

Source: World Football
Notes:
1: Club's stadium had a lower capacity due to renovation works.

== See also ==
- 2021–22 Segunda División (second tier)
- 2021–22 Primera División RFEF (third tier)
- 2021–22 Segunda División RFEF (fourth tier)
- 2021–22 Tercera División RFEF (fifth tier)
- 2021–22 Primera División (women's league)
