= Sumy (footballer) =

Malian footballer

Personal information
- Full name: Soumaïla Konaré
- Date of birth: 22 July 1991 (age 35)
- Place of birth: Kati, Mali
- Height: 1.84 m (6 ft 0 in)
- Position: Midfielder

Team information
- Current team: Lynx
- Number: 5

Youth career
- 2008–2009: Mora
- 2009–2010: Albacete

Senior career*
| Years | Team | Apps | (Gls) |
| 2009–2010 | Albacete B | 3 | (0) |
| 2010–2012 | Albacete | 16 | (1) |
| 2012 | → Celta B (loan) | 6 | (0) |
| 2012 | Africain | 0 | (0) |
| 2012–2013 | Mora | 0 | (0) |
| 2013–2015 | Madridejos | 20 | (0) |
| 2015 | Guadalajara | 3 | (0) |
| 2015–2016 | Madridejos | 8 | (0) |
| 2016–2017 | Alcobendas | 26 | (2) |
| 2017–2018 | Mora | 30 | (2) |
| 2018–2019 | San Roque de Lepe | 9 | (0) |
| 2019–2020 | Tarancón | 34 | (2) |
| 2020– | Lynx | 4 | (0) |
- * Club domestic league appearances and goals as of 16 December 2020

Soumaïla Konaré (born 22 July 1991), commonly known as Sumy, is a Malian footballer who plays for Gibraltar National League side Lynx as a midfielder.

== Club career ==
Born in Kati, Sumy joined Albacete Balompié's youth setup in 2009 from Mora CF. After making his senior debuts with the reserves in the Tercera División, he was definitely promoted to the main squad in August 2010.

Sumy made his first-team debut on 11 September 2010, coming on as a second-half substitute for David Sousa in a 2–1 home win against Granada CF in the Segunda División. He appeared in 11 matches during the campaign, as Alba suffered an immediate relegation.

On 25 January 2012, after being rarely used, Sumy was loaned to Celta de Vigo B until June and with an obligatory buyout clause. In August he signed a four-year deal with Tunisian side Club Africain, but in November returned to his first club Mora.

On 20 August 2013 Sumy moved to CD Madridejos, in the fourth tier. On 9 July 2015 he signed a one-year deal with Segunda División B side Guadalajara; after being rarely used, he returned to his former club Madridejos in October.
