= Victoria CF =

Victoria
- Full name: Victoria Club de Fútbol
- Nickname: As cebras
- Founded: February 1943; 83 years ago
- Stadium: Campos Municipais de Fútbol de San Pedro de Visma
- Capacity: 1,000
- President: Juan Vázquez
- Head coach: Guillermo Pigueiras
- League: Primera Futgal – Group 1
- 2025–26: Preferente Futgal – Group 1, 15th of 18 (relegated)
- Website: victoriacf.com
Home colours	Away colours

Victoria Club de Fútbol is a Spanish football club based in the municipality of A Coruña, in the autonomous community of Galicia. Founded in 1943, they currently play in Primera Futgal – Group 1, holding home matches at the Campos Municipais de Fútbol de San Pedro de Visma.

== History ==
Founded in February 1943, Victoria played amateur leagues (named Modestos A Coruña at the time) until 1993, when they entered in the Tercera Regional, the lowest league tier. The club achieved promotion to the Segunda Regional in 1996 after finishing in the first position, and went on to play in the division until 2009, when they achieved promotion to the Primeira Autonómica.

After achieving a first-ever promotion to the Preferente de Galicia in 2020, Victoria qualified to the 2021–22 Copa del Rey after defeating Juventud Cambados in the cup play-offs final.

== Season to season ==
Season	Tier	Division	Place	Copa del Rey
1993–94	8	3ª Reg.	8th	
1994–95	8	3ª Reg.	3rd	
1995–96	8	3ª Reg.	1st	
1996–97	7	2ª Reg.	6th	
1997–98	7	2ª Reg.	5th	
1998–99	7	2ª Reg.	11th	
1999–2000	7	2ª Reg.	9th	
2000–01	7	2ª Reg.	6th	
2001–02	7	2ª Reg.	7th	
2002–03	7	2ª Reg.	2nd	
2003–04	7	2ª Reg.	2nd	
2004–05	7	2ª Reg.	7th	
2005–06	7	2ª Reg.	2nd	
2006–07	7	2ª Aut.	2nd	
2007–08	7	2ª Aut.	4th	
2008–09	7	2ª Aut.	2nd	
2009–10	6	1ª Aut.	7th	
2010–11	6	1ª Aut.	9th	
2011–12	6	1ª Aut.	15th	
2012–13	6	1ª Aut.	8th	

Season	Tier	Division	Place	Copa del Rey
2013–14	6	1ª Aut.	2nd	
2014–15	6	1ª Aut.	3rd	
2015–16	6	1ª Aut.	7th	
2016–17	6	1ª Gal.	5th	
2017–18	6	1ª Gal.	3rd	
2018–19	6	1ª Gal.	2nd	
2019–20	6	1ª Gal.	1st	
2020–21	5	Pref.	3rd	
2021–22	6	Pref.	9th	First round
2022–23	6	Pref.	15th	
2023–24	6	Pref.	16th	
2024–25	7	1ª Futgal	2nd	
2025–26	6	Pref. Futgal		

== Notable players ==
- (Spain) Amancio
- (Spain) Raúl García (youth)
- (Spain) Rubén de la Barrera
