= Berbinzana =

- Municipality
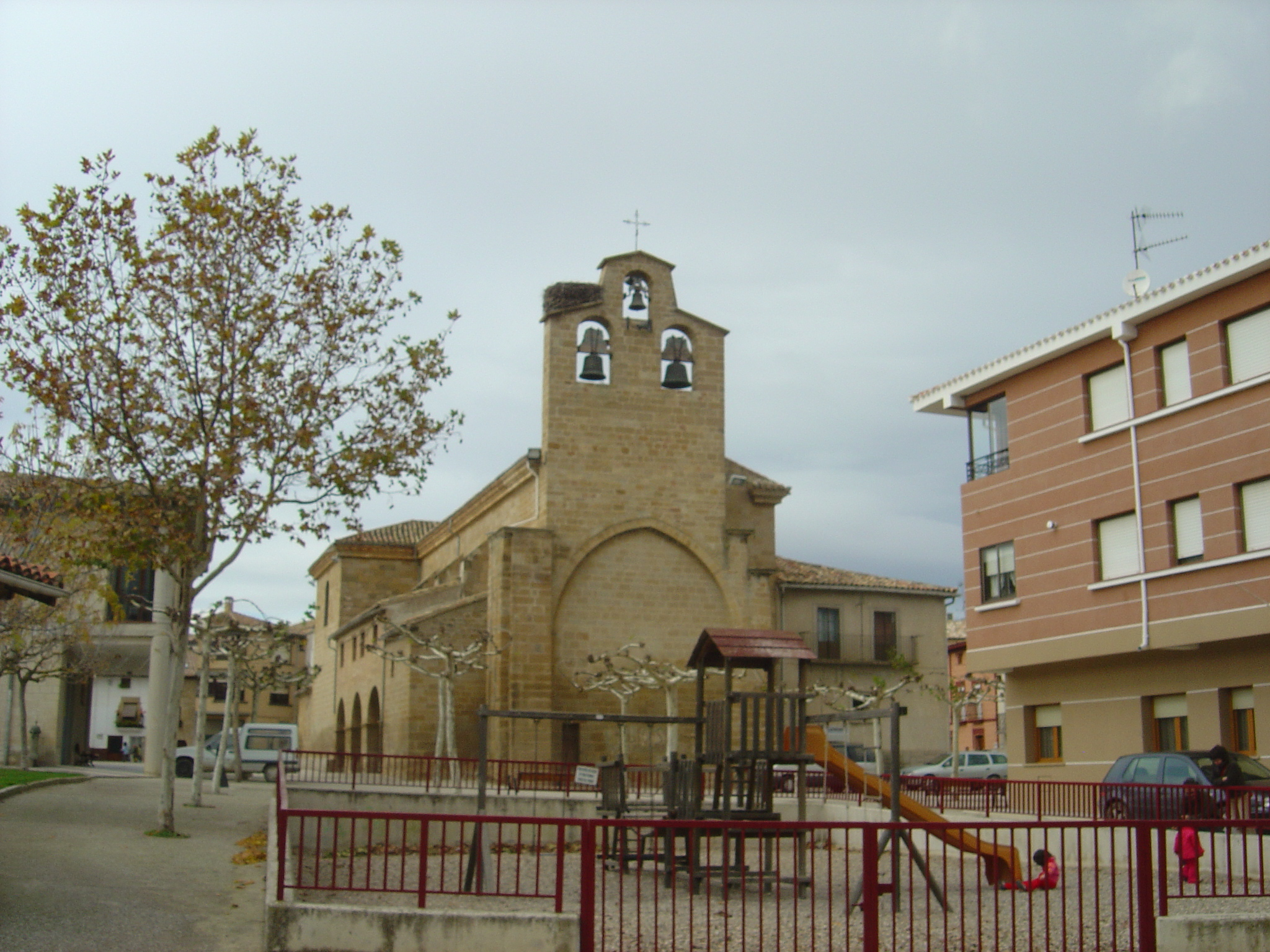
- A church in Berbinzana.

- Flag Coat of arms

- Location of Berbinzana. Berbinzana (Navarre)
- Coordinates: 42°32′N 1°50′W
- Country: Spain
- Community: Navarre
- Province: Navarre
- Comarca: Tafalla

Government
  - Mayor: Ángel Diez Asenjo (Por Berbinzana)

Area
  - Total: 12.98 km^{2} (5.01 sq mi)

Population (2023)
  - Total: 672
  - Density: 51.8/km^{2} (134/sq mi)
- Time zone: UTC+1 (CET)
  - Summer (DST): UTC+2 (CEST)
- Postal code: 31252
- Website: www.berbinzana.info

Berbinzana (Basque: Berbintzana) is a town and municipality located in the province and autonomous community of Navarre, in northern Spain.

== Overview ==
Berbinzana is a small village located in Navarre province, in Northern Spain. Berbinzana is on the banks of the Arga River and surrounded by fertile fields. Agriculture is the primary economic activity. Berbinzana also has a wide variety of plants and animals. Berbinzana has a deeply rooted culture and is faithful to its traditions, where the festivities are celebrated with the traditional red handkerchief.

== Nature ==
Berbinzana has a fairly typical Mediterranean climate, with warm summers and cold winters. The Arga river tempers this some and provides many wild animals to the area.

== Culture ==
There are several groups that promote cultural activities. These include "San Isidro", with more than six hundred members, the young society of "La Unión", and the football club CD Injerto.

== Events ==
A time to enjoy visiting Berbinzana is during one of its numerous events. The main holidays in the village include:

- Asunción Fiesta: From August 14 to 21. It is the patron saint day and the main event in the village.
- Angel Fiesta: March 1. It is a small fiesta and lasts 4 days.
- St Isidro: May 15. It is the farmer festivity and the recreational society.
- The Young Holiday: In the early days of December. It is organised by "La Unión".

The principal activities are the festivals, the running of the bulls, dances, fireworks and other spectacles.
