= Luis Tevenet =

Spanish footballer and football manager

Personal information
- Full name: Luis García Tevenet
- Date of birth: 8 May 1974 (age 52)
- Place of birth: Seville, Spain
- Height: 1.78 m (5 ft 10 in)
- Position: Forward

Youth career
- Sevilla

Senior career*
Years	Team	Apps	(Gls)
1992–1994	Sevilla B	43	(8)
1994–1997	Sevilla	78	(6)
1997–1999	Atlético Madrid B	63	(27)
1999	Atlético Madrid	5	(0)
1999–2002	Las Palmas	58	(13)
2000–2001	→ Sevilla (loan)	33	(4)
2002–2003	Poli Ejido	27	(4)
2003–2004	Algeciras	31	(2)
2004–2006	Numancia	64	(13)
2006–2007	Lleida	32	(14)
2007–2008	Orihuela	40	(9)
Total		474	(100)

Managerial career
- 2008–2009: Orihuela
- 2009: Jerez Industrial
- 2010: Sevilla (assistant)
- 2011–2012: San Roque
- 2012–2013: UCAM Murcia
- 2013–2014: Cartagena
- 2014–2015: Huesca
- 2016–2017: Hércules
- 2017–2018: Sevilla B
- 2018–2020: Levante B
- 2021–2024: Atlético Madrid B
- 2024–2025: Atlético Madrid (assistant)
- 2025: Botafogo (assistant)
- 2025–2026: Valladolid
- * Club domestic league appearances and goals

Luis García Tevenet (born 8 May 1974) is a Spanish former professional footballer who played as a forward. He is a current manager.

In a 16-year senior career, spent mainly with Sevilla, he appeared in 359 matches across the two major divisions of Spanish football, scoring 69 goals. In La Liga, he totalled 141 games and 17 goals over seven seasons.

As a manager, Tevenet worked mainly in the lower leagues, with brief Segunda División spells at Huesca, Sevilla B and Valladolid.

== Playing career ==
Born in Seville, Andalusia, and a product of hometown Sevilla's prolific youth system, Tevenet made his first-team and La Liga debut on 2 January 1994, playing 29 minutes in a 1–0 home win against Real Sociedad. However, he would never be more than a relatively used attacking player, mainly off the bench.

Tevenet completed his football development aged 23 when he joined Atlético Madrid B, appearing in five matches for the main squad during the 1998–99 season as a substitute. Subsequently, he spent two years at Las Palmas (with a loan to old team Sevilla in between, in the Segunda División), scoring five goals in 28 games in his last year – only nine starts – as the Canarians suffered top-flight relegation.

After that, Tevenet competed mostly in the second tier and the Segunda División B, with Polideportivo Ejido, Algeciras, Numancia (with a brief top-division return in the 2004–05 campaign) and Lleida. For 2007–08 he joined Orihuela where, after a season and a half, he retired and became the new coach of the team.

== Coaching career ==
In late 2009, Tevenet was in charge of Jerez Industrial in division three for only a month before quitting due to the club's financial problems. In March 2010, following former Sevilla teammate Manolo Jiménez's dismissal, he returned to the Ramón Sánchez-Pizjuán Stadium and was appointed assistant manager, leaving his post in September after Antonio Álvarez was fired.

Tevenet returned to the third tier with San Roque in 2011, leaving after one year. He then signed for fellow league side UCAM Murcia, halfway through a season that ended in relegation. He remained in the Region of Murcia for 2013–14 at Cartagena, leaving after a 5–1 aggregate defeat to Real Avilés in the promotion playoffs.

On 29 June 2014, Tevenet was appointed manager of Huesca. He led the Aragonese to first place in their group, and promotion to the second division via a 3–1 aggregate win over Huracán Valencia in the playoffs. He was relieved of his duties on 30 November, after four consecutive defeats.

Tevenet was named coach of Hércules on 1 July 2016, and was sacked the following 5 March for a poor run of form. On 22 June 2017, he returned to Sevilla to manage the reserves in the second division. After the season ended with relegation he left for another B team, Levante B.

On 15 December 2020, Tevenet was replaced by Alessio Lisci, having won once and lost five times in the first seven games of the campaign. The following June, he was hired at Atlético Madrid B where he had played over two decades prior. He earned promotion from Tercera Federación as group champions in his first season, winning 29 of 40 fixtures.

In the following campaign, Tevenet's side achieved another promotion to reach Primera Federación, finishing second in their group and later winning the promotion play-offs against Espanyol B. In June 2024, he returned to Atlético's first team as assistant under Diego Simeone.

Tevenet had his first experience abroad in July 2025, joining Davide Ancelotti's staff at Campeonato Brasileiro Série A club Botafogo. On 23 December, he returned to his home country after being named manager of Real Valladolid in the second division. On 15 February of the following year, having won just one of seven matches and with his team in the relegation zone following a 5–1 loss at Granada, he was dismissed by the latter.

== Managerial statistics ==
As of match played 14 February 2026

Managerial record by team and tenure
Team	Nat	From	To	Record								Ref
Team	Nat	From	To	G	W	D	L	GF	GA	GD	Win %	Ref
Orihuela	(Spain)	22 December 2008	30 June 2009	20	9	4	7	25	24	+1	45.00	
Jerez Industrial	(Spain)	23 November 2009	23 December 2009	4	1	0	3	2	5	−3	25.00	
San Roque	(Spain)	1 July 2011	30 June 2012	42	20	7	15	49	39	+10	47.62	
UCAM Murcia	(Spain)	12 December 2012	26 June 2013	22	9	8	5	27	19	+8	40.91	
Cartagena	(Spain)	26 June 2013	29 June 2014	45	24	10	11	68	49	+19	53.33	
Huesca	(Spain)	29 June 2014	30 November 2015	65	29	19	17	92	66	+26	44.62	
Hércules	(Spain)	1 July 2016	5 March 2017	33	15	6	12	44	37	+7	45.45	
Sevilla B	(Spain)	22 June 2017	15 June 2018	42	7	11	24	29	60	−31	16.67	
Levante B	(Spain)	5 July 2018	15 December 2020	74	22	19	33	74	88	−14	29.73	
Atlético Madrid B	(Spain)	1 July 2021	11 June 2024	116	63	32	21	199	105	+94	54.31	
Valladolid	(Spain)	23 December 2025	15 February 2026	7	1	1	5	6	17	−11	14.29	
Career total				468	199	117	152	612	504	+108	42.52	—

== Honours ==
=== Player ===
Las Palmas

- Segunda División: 1999–2000

Sevilla

- Segunda División: 2000–01
