= CF San Agustín del Guadalix =

Spanish football team

San Agustín del Guadalix
- Full name: Club de Fútbol San Agustín del Guadalix
- Founded: 1987; 39 years ago
- Ground: Campo de Fútbol San Agustin de Guadalix, San Agustín del Guadalix, Madrid, Spain
- Capacity: 2,000
- President: Juan Manuel García
- Head coach: Chema Hidalgo
- League: Primera Autonómica de Aficionados – Group 1
- 2025–26: Primera Autonómica de Aficionados – Group 1, 11th of 18
Home colours	Away colours

Club de Fútbol San Agustín del Guadalix is a Spanish football team based in San Agustín del Guadalix, in the Community of Madrid. Founded in 1987, it plays in Primera Autonómica de Aficionados – Group 1, holding home matches at Campo de Fútbol San Agustin de Guadalix, with a capacity of 2,000 people.

== Season to season ==
Season	Tier	Division	Place	Copa del Rey
1987–88	8	3ª Reg.	1st	
1988–89	7	2ª Reg.	16th	
1989–90	7	2ª Reg.	3rd	
1990–91	7	2ª Reg.	11th	
1991–92	7	2ª Reg.	16th	
1992–93	7	2ª Reg.	12th	
1993–94	7	2ª Reg.	13th	
1994–95	7	2ª Reg.	15th	
1995–96	7	2ª Reg.	9th	
1996–97	7	2ª Reg.	3rd	
1997–98	7	2ª Reg.	6th	
1998–99	7	2ª Reg.	17th	
1999–2000	6	1ª Reg.	10th	
2000–01	6	1ª Reg.	9th	
2001–02	6	1ª Reg.	6th	
2002–03	6	1ª Reg.	7th	
2003–04	6	1ª Reg.	11th	
2004–05	6	1ª Reg.	18th	
2005–06	7	2ª Reg.	7th	
2006–07	7	2ª Reg.	6th	

Season	Tier	Division	Place	Copa del Rey
2007–08	7	2ª Reg.	4th	
2008–09	7	2ª Reg.	5th	
2009–10	7	2ª Afic.	6th	
2010–11	7	2ª Afic.	1st	
2011–12	6	1ª Afic.	9th	
2012–13	6	1ª Afic.	3rd	
2013–14	6	1ª Afic.	4th	
2014–15	6	1ª Afic.	5th	
2015–16	6	1ª Afic.	2nd	
2016–17	5	Pref.	2nd	
2017–18	4	3ª	14th	
2018–19	4	3ª	19th	
2019–20	5	Pref.	6th	
2020–21	5	Pref.	3rd	
2021–22	6	Pref.	7th	First round
2022–23	6	Pref.	3rd	
2023–24	6	Pref.	3rd	
2024–25	6	1ª Aut.	4th	
2025–26	6	1ª Aut.		

- 2 seasons in Tercera División
