= CD Utrillas =

Association football club in Spain

Utrillas
- Full name: Club Deportivo Utrillas
- Founded: 1958
- Ground: La Vega; Utrillas, Aragon, Spain
- Capacity: 2,500
- President: Pedro Asensio
- Head coach: Pitu Lerga
- League: Regional Preferente – Group 2
- 2025–26: Tercera Federación – Group 17, 17th of 18 (relegated)
Home colours	Away colours

Club Deportivo Utrillas is a Spanish football team based in Utrillas, in the autonomous community of Aragon. Founded in 1958, the club plays in the Regional Preferente – Group 2, and holds home games at Campo de Fútbol La Vega, with a capacity of 2,500 seats.

== Season to season ==
Season	Tier	Division	Place	Copa del Rey
1968–69	6	2ª Reg.	1st	
1969–70	6	2ª Reg.	4th	
1970–71	6	2ª Reg.	1st	
1971–72	6	2ª Reg.	4th	
1972–73	6	2ª Reg. P.	15th	
1973–74	6	2ª Reg. P.	6th	
1974–75	5	1ª Reg.	11th	
1975–76	5	1ª Reg.	3rd	
1976–77	4	Reg. Pref.	17th	
1977–78	5	Reg. Pref.	15th	
1978–79	5	Reg. Pref.	10th	
1979–80	5	Reg. Pref.	3rd	
1980–81	4	3ª	18th	
1981–82	4	3ª	8th	
1982–83	4	3ª	11th	
1983–84	4	3ª	17th	
1984–85	5	Reg. Pref.	3rd	
1985–86	5	Reg. Pref.	12th	
1986–87	5	Reg. Pref.	2nd	
1987–88	4	3ª	13th	

Season	Tier	Division	Place	Copa del Rey
1988–89	4	3ª	9th	
1989–90	4	3ª	8th	
1990–91	4	3ª	9th	
1991–92	4	3ª	20th	
1992–93	5	Reg. Pref.	2nd	
1993–94	5	Reg. Pref.	1st	
1994–95	4	3ª	17th	
1995–96	4	3ª	16th	
1996–97	4	3ª	20th	
1997–98	5	Reg. Pref.	17th	
1998–99	6	1ª Reg.	2nd	
1999–2000	5	Reg. Pref.	18th	
2000–01	6	1ª Reg.	9th	
2001–02	6	1ª Reg.	6th	
2002–03	6	1ª Reg.	10th	
2003–04	6	1ª Reg.	7th	
2004–05	6	1ª Reg.	7th	
2005–06	6	1ª Reg.	2nd	
2006–07	6	1ª Reg.	5th	
2007–08	6	1ª Reg.	4th	

Season	Tier	Division	Place	Copa del Rey
2008–09	6	1ª Reg.	6th	
2009–10	6	1ª Reg.	2nd	
2010–11	5	Reg. Pref.	12th	
2011–12	5	Reg. Pref.	13th	
2012–13	5	Reg. Pref.	10th	
2013–14	5	Reg. Pref.	7th	
2014–15	5	Reg. Pref.	6th	
2015–16	5	Reg. Pref.	8th	
2016–17	5	Reg. Pref.	3rd	
2017–18	5	Reg. Pref.	13th	
2018–19	5	Reg. Pref.	6th	
2019–20	5	Reg. Pref.	6th	
2020–21	5	Reg. Pref.	2nd	
2021–22	6	Reg. Pref.	1st	First round
2022–23	5	3ª Fed.	9th	
2023–24	5	3ª Fed.	10th	
2024–25	5	3ª Fed.	10th	
2025–26	5	3ª Fed.		

- 12 seasons in Tercera División
- 4 seasons in Tercera Federación
