= Mora CF =

Association football team in Spain

Mora
- Full name: Mora Club de Fútbol
- Founded: 1977
- Ground: Las Delicias, Mora, Castilla-La Mancha, Spain
- Capacity: 600
- Chairman: (Spain) Gregorio de la Cruz
- Manager: (Spain) Kiko Vilches
- League: Primera Autonómica – Group 3
- 2024–25: Primera Autonómica – Group 3, 4th of 16
Home colours	Away colours

Mora Club de Fútbol is a football team based in Mora in the autonomous community of Castilla-La Mancha. Founded in 1977, it plays in the Primera Autonómica – Group 3. Its stadium is Municipal Las Delicias with a capacity of 600 seats.

== History ==
The history of football in the town of Mora started at the end of the 1920s. At that time friendly matches were played against teams from neighboring towns.

== Season to season ==
Season	Tier	Division	Place	Copa del Rey
1979–80	8	3º Reg.	6th	
1980–81	8	3º Reg.	2nd	
1981–82	7	2º Reg.	10th	
1982–83	6	1ª Reg.	4th	
1983–84	5	Reg. Pref.	8th	
1984–85	5	Reg. Pref.	6th	
1985–86	5	Reg. Pref.	6th	
1986–87	5	Reg. Pref.	11th	
1987–88	5	Reg. Pref.	4th	
1988–89	5	Reg. Pref.	16th	
1989–90	6	1ª Reg.	1st	
1990–91	5	Reg. Pref.	4th	
1991–92	5	Reg. Pref.	3rd	
1992–93	5	Reg. Pref.	4th	
1993–94	4	3ª	19th	
1994–95	5	Reg. Pref.	3rd	
1995–96	5	Aut. Pref.	2nd	
1996–97	4	3ª	20th	
1997–98	5	Aut. Pref.	3rd	
1998–99	5	Aut. Pref.	5th	

Season	Tier	Division	Place	Copa del Rey
1999–2000	5	Aut. Pref.	9th	
2000–01	5	Aut. Pref.	5th	
2001–02	5	Aut. Pref.	10th	
2002–03	5	Aut. Pref.	13th	
2003–04	5	Aut. Pref.	12th	
2004–05	5	Aut. Pref.	14th	
2005–06	5	Aut. Pref.	7th	
2006–07	5	Aut. Pref.	8th	
2007–08	5	Aut. Pref.	3rd	
2008–09	5	Aut. Pref.	3rd	
2009–10	4	3ª	19th	
2010–11	5	Aut. Pref.	4th	
2011–12	5	Aut. Pref.	1st	
2012–13	4	3ª	16th	
2013–14	4	3ª	16th	
2014–15	4	3ª	8th	
2015–16	4	3ª	15th	
2016–17	4	3ª	14th	
2017–18	4	3ª	8th	
2018–19	4	3ª	20th	

Season	Tier	Division	Place	Copa del Rey
2019–20	5	Aut. Pref.	2nd	
2020–21	5	Aut. Pref.	2nd	
2021–22	6	Aut. Pref.	4th	Preliminary
2022–23	6	Aut. Pref.	7th	
2023–24	6	Aut. Pref.	18th	
2024–25	7	1ª Aut.	4th	
2025–26	7	1ª Aut.		

- 10 seasons in Tercera División

== Notable players ==
- (Mali) Soumaïla Konaré
