= CD Injerto =

Spanish football team

Injerto
- Full name: Club Deportivo Injerto
- Founded: 1946
- Ground: El Sotico, Berbinzana, Navarre, Spain
- Capacity: 1,000
- President: Manuel Chocarro
- Head coach: Kike Jurío
- League: Primera Autonómica
- 2025–26: Primera Autonómica, 14th of 18
Home colours	Away colours

Club Deportivo Injerto is a Spanish football team based in Berbinzana, in the autonomous community of Navarre. Founded in 1946, they play in Primera Autonómica, holding home matches at Campo de Fútbol El Sotico, with a capacity of 1,000 people.

== Season to season ==
Season	Tier	Division	Place	Copa del Rey
1946–1970	—	Regional	—	
1970–71	6	3ª Reg.	6th	
1971–72	6	3ª Reg.	5th	
1972–73	6	3ª Reg.	4th	
1973–74	6	3ª Reg.	5th	
1974–75	6	2ª Reg.	13th	
1975–76	6	2ª Reg.	6th	
1976–77	6	2ª Reg.	4th	
1977–78	6	1ª Reg.	16th	
1978–79	7	2ª Reg.	3rd	
1979–80	6	1ª Reg.	16th	
1980–81	DNP			
1981–82	7	2ª Reg.	7th	
1982–1992	DNP			
1992–93	6	1ª Reg.	6th	
1993–94	6	1ª Reg.	1st	
1994–95	6	1ª Reg.	2nd	
1995–96	6	1ª Reg.	3rd	
1996–97	6	1ª Reg.	8th	
1997–98	6	1ª Reg.	7th	

Season	Tier	Division	Place	Copa del Rey
1998–99	6	1ª Reg.	3rd	
1999–2000	5	Reg. Pref.	19th	
2000–01	6	1ª Reg.	2nd	
2001–02	5	Reg. Pref.	19th	
2002–03	6	1ª Reg.	11th	
2003–04	6	1ª Reg.	9th	
2004–05	6	1ª Reg.	3rd	
2005–06	5	Reg. Pref.	14th	
2006–07	5	Reg. Pref.	9th	
2007–08	5	Reg. Pref.	5th	
2008–09	5	Reg. Pref.	12th	
2009–10	5	Reg. Pref.	9th	
2010–11	5	Reg. Pref.	10th	
2011–12	5	Reg. Pref.	15th	
2012–13	6	1ª Reg.	9th	
2013–14	6	1ª Reg.	5th	
2014–15	6	1ª Reg.	2nd	
2015–16	6	Reg. Pref.	6th	
2016–17	6	Reg. Pref.	4th	
2017–18	6	Reg. Pref.	9th	

Season	Tier	Division	Place	Copa del Rey
2018–19	6	Reg. Pref.	6th	
2019–20	6	Reg. Pref.	5th	
2020–21	DNP			
2021–22	7	Reg. Pref.	1st	Preliminary
2022–23	6	1ª Aut.	7th	
2023–24	6	1ª Aut.	7th	
2024–25	6	1ª Aut.	6th	
2025–26	6	1ª Aut.		
