= Jesús Álvarez (footballer, born 1999) =

Spanish footballer

Personal information
- Full name: Jesús Álvarez Aguado
- Date of birth: 17 November 1999 (age 26)
- Place of birth: Zaragoza, Spain
- Height: 1.80 m (5 ft 11 in)
- Position: Defensive midfielder

Team information
- Current team: Tenerife

Youth career
- Montecarlo
- 2015–2017: Zaragoza

Senior career*
Years	Team	Apps	(Gls)
2017–2020	Zaragoza B	67	(3)
2020–2022	Calahorra	48	(1)
2022–2023	Cultural Leonesa	30	(0)
2023–2025	Ibiza	46	(0)
2025–2026	Huesca	36	(0)
2026–	Tenerife	0	(0)
- * Club domestic league appearances and goals as of 9 June 2026

Jesús Álvarez Aguado (born 17 November 1999) is a Spanish footballer who plays for CD Tenerife. Mainly a defensive midfielder, he can also play as a centre-back.

== Career ==
Born in Zaragoza, Aragon, Álvarez joined Real Zaragoza's youth sides in 2015, from UD Montecarlo. He made his senior debut with the reserves on 28 October 2017, starting in a 2–1 Segunda División B away loss to Atlético Saguntino.

Álvarez scored his first senior goals on 20 October 2019, netting a brace for the B's in a 4–1 Tercera División home routing of AD Almudévar. On 30 July of the following year, he moved to CD Calahorra in the third division.

A first-choice, Álvarez switched from his original centre-back position to a defensive midfielder role during the 2021–22 season, which led to rumours of a return to Zaragoza in January 2022. On 6 July of that year, however, he joined fellow Primera Federación side Cultural y Deportiva Leonesa on a one-year contract.

On 7 July 2023, Álvarez agreed to a one-year deal with UD Ibiza also in division three. Despite struggling with injuries in his first season, he still signed a new one-year contract on 1 July 2024.

On 1 July 2025, Álvarez moved to Segunda División side SD Huesca on a two-year deal. He made his professional debut on 17 August, starting in a 1–1 home draw against CD Leganés.

Álvarez left Huesca after suffering relegation, and signed a two-year contract with CD Tenerife, newly-promoted to division two, on 30 June 2026.
