= CD Huracán Melilla =

Spanish football team

Huracán Melilla
- Full name: Club Deportivo Huracán Melilla
- Founded: 2020
- Dissolved: 2023
- Ground: La Espiguera; Melilla, Spain
- Capacity: 2,000
- President: Felipe Heredia
- Head coach: Marso Mohamed
- 2022–23: Tercera Federación – Group 9, 16th of 16 (relegated)
Home colours	Away colours

Club Deportivo Huracán Melilla was a Spanish football team based in Melilla. Founded in 2020 and dissolved in 2023, they held home games at Estadio La Espiguera, which has a capacity of 2,000 spectators.

== Season to season ==
Season	Tier	Division	Place	Copa del Rey
2020–21	5	1ª Aut.	2nd	
2021–22	6	1ª Aut.	1st	First round
2022–23	5	3ª Fed.	16th	

- 1 season in Tercera Federación
