= Ramón Arcas =

Spanish footballer

Personal information
- Full name: Ramón Arcas Cárdenas
- Date of birth: 25 January 1991 (age 35)
- Place of birth: Águilas, Spain
- Height: 1.82 m (6 ft 0 in)
- Position: Midfielder

Youth career
- 2000–2006: Águilas CF
- 2006–2010: Porto
- 2010: Racing Santander

Senior career*
| Years | Team | Apps | (Gls) |
| 2010–2011 | Racing B | 12 | (0) |
| 2011 | Racing Santander | 1 | (0) |
| 2011–2012 | Recreativo | 33 | (0) |
| 2013 | Cartagena | 19 | (1) |
| 2013–2014 | Getafe B | 27 | (0) |
| 2014–2015 | Cartagena | 31 | (1) |
| 2015–2016 | Águilas | 30 | (2) |
| 2016–2017 | Peña Deportiva | 33 | (1) |
| 2017–2018 | Atlético Pulpileño | 31 | (0) |
| 2018–2024 | Águilas | 91 | (4) |
| 2024–2025 | Lorca Deportiva | 29 | (1) |
- * Club domestic league appearances and goals as of 4 May 2025

Ramon Arcas Cárdenas (born 25 January 1991) is a Spanish footballer who plays mainly as a midfielder.

== Club career ==
Born in Águilas, Region of Murcia, Arcas played for three clubs as a youth, including hometowns' Águilas CF. He finished his formation at Racing de Santander in 2010, then started playing as a senior with the reserve team in Tercera División.

On 9 January 2011, Arcas made his debut with Racing's main squad, starting in a 1–1 La Liga home draw against Sporting de Gijón and featuring 80 minutes. In August he signed for Segunda División side Recreativo de Huelva, appearing in his first official game with his new team on the 27th against Deportivo de La Coruña (45 minutes played, 0–1 away loss).

On 3 January 2013, Arcas terminated his contract with the Andalusians and joined FC Cartagena from Segunda División B. On 6 October he moved to another reserve team, Getafe CF B in the same level.

After appearing regularly for the Madrid outskirts club, Arcas returned to Cartagena on 27 June 2014.
