= Vinicius Tanque =

Brazilian footballer

Personal information
- Full name: Vinicius Rodolfo de Souza Oliveira
- Date of birth: 27 March 1995 (age 31)
- Place of birth: Rio de Janeiro, Brazil
- Height: 1.84 m (6 ft 1/2 in)
- Position: Forward

Team information
- Current team: Atlético Baleares (on loan from Cartagena)
- Number: 9

Youth career
- Botafogo

Senior career*
Years	Team	Apps	(Gls)
2015–2020	Botafogo	44	(3)
2016	→ Volta Redonda (loan)	1	(0)
2018	→ Atlético Goianiense (loan)	6	(0)
2018–2019	→ Mafra (loan)	19	(3)
2020	→ Cartagena (loan)	4	(2)
2020–	Cartagena	1	(0)
2020–	→ Atlético Baleares (loan)	8	(4)
- * Club domestic league appearances and goals as of 18:30, 1 January 2021 (UTC)

Vinicius Rodolfo de Souza Oliveira (born 27 March 1995), known as Vinicius Tanque, is a Brazilian footballer who plays as a forward for Spanish club CD Atlético Baleares, on loan from FC Cartagena.

== Career statistics ==
=== Club ===
As of 28 November 2019.

Club	Season	League			State League		National Cup		Continental		Other		Total	
Club	Season	Division	Apps	Goals	Apps	Goals	Apps	Goals	Apps	Goals	Apps	Goals	Apps	Goals
Botafogo	2015	Série B	4	0	0	0	0	0	—		—		4	0
Botafogo	2016	Série A	12	0	—		3	1	—		—		15	1
Botafogo	2017	Série A	10	2	6	1	2	0	—		—		18	3
Botafogo	2018	Série A	0	0	0	0	0	0	—		—		0	0
Botafogo	2019	Série A	9	0	0	0	0	0	—		—		9	0
Botafogo	Total		35	2	6	1	5	0	—		—		46	3
Volta Redonda (loan)	2016	Série D	0	0	8	0	—		—		—		8	0
Atlético Goianiense (loan)	2018	Série B	0	0	6	0	0	0	—		—		6	0
Mafra (loan)	2018–19	LigaPro	19	4	—		1	0	—		1 (Note: Appearance(s) in Taça da Liga)	0	21	4
Career total			54	6	20	1	6	0	0	0	1	0	81	7
