= Fortuna, Murcia =

Fortuna
- Municipality
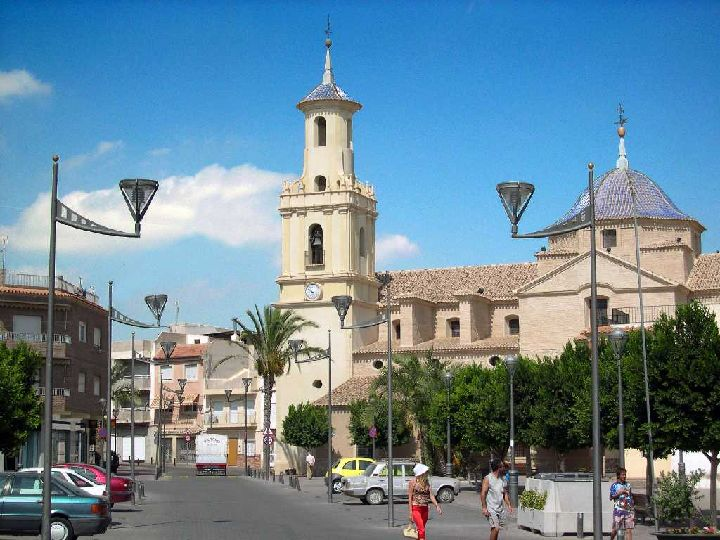

- Coat of arms

- Location in Murcia

- Location in Murcia Location in Spain
- Country: Spain
- Autonomous community: Murcia
- Province: Murcia
- Comarca: Comarca Oriental
- Judicial party: Cieza

Government
  - Mayor: Catalina Herrero López

Area
  - Total: 148.5 km^{2} (57.3 sq mi)
- Elevation: 192 m (630 ft)

Population (2025-01-01)
  - Total: 11,437
  - Density: 77.02/km^{2} (199.5/sq mi)
- Website: Official website

Fortuna is a town and a municipality in the autonomous Region of Murcia in southeastern Spain. It is located in the northeast of the region and in Comarca Oriental. The municipality shares borders with Abanilla at its east, Jumilla and Abarán at is north, Blanca at its northwest, Molina at its west and southwest and Murcia and Santomera at its south.

== History ==
There is evidence of human occupancy of the municipality since the Chalcolithic. [The proof consists in an archaeological site named La Loma II.] There are also remains of inhabitance of the Bronze Age. It consists in a settlement of people belonging to the argaric civilization. In the late Bronze Age another civilization was present in large part of the Iberian Peninsula and specifically in the municipality - the Iberians. In regards to Fortuna, they had a settlement and a necropolis.

During the Roman Iberian Peninsula there were also people in Fortuna. One trace of those people is the archeological site Baños de Fortuna. It includes a former sanctuary, a former hostelry and an ancient quarry zone.

There are few documentary references about this current municipality during the Islamic Iberian Peninsula era. There is a documentary reference about the main remain of Fortuna under Islamic rule – It is a castle named currently Torre Vieja or Castillo de los Moros, and them named Yusor castle. The reference consists in the fact that the castle was given by the last Muslim king in Murcia to Alfonso X in the year 1264, in the era of Christians conquer of the Taifa of Murcia. It is speculated that the quantity of inhabitants decreased from the Roman Iberian Peninsula era to the Muslim era.

The excavation of the site Baños de Fortuna also showed the presence and use of the Muslims of the termal bath structure.

King Sancho IV of Castile forced the Muslims and Jews to sell the lands they owned in the year 1293. The Muslim king, who owned the estate of Fortuna, was compelled to sell it to a Christian man. The new owner of the lands sold them to Pedro Geralt and that led the town to have a more Castilian nature.

There were attempts to repopulate the territory, as typically in the recently conquered lands, but the characteristics of the territory ground lead to a lack of interest in moving there.

In the year 1379, the territory was bought so as to belong to the municipality of Murcia.

In the early 17th century an expulsion of Muslims was ordered, but in Murcia territory they had permission to stay. In the year 1613, king Philip III of Spain had a decree written about Muslim expulsion without exception.

After the expulsion, there was an aim about repopulating Fortuna with Christians. There were some privileges for the people who moved there. In the year 1628, Fortuna was awarded with the status of ‘villa’ (a settlement with several new rights). Consequently, the barren lands began to be cultivated.

After the Roman and Muslim eras, the thermal baths. There were not any documentary references of the baths until the year 1728, when Philip V of Spain mentioned briefly the presence of the thermal baths.

A parish church of Fortuna named La Purísima was built in the second quarter of the 18th century.

In the year 1860, the spa hotel of Fortuna was built and it is also the first one of Region of Murcia. In the year 1905, it experienced a fire and had to be rebuilt.

In the late 19th century, other remarkable buildings were also built such as the Casino of Fortuna from 1896 to 1906.

== Geography ==
=== Physical geography ===
Large part of Sierra del Corque mountain range and part of Sierra de la Pila rely on this municipality. The last one occupies the north of the territory. Other landforms are several gullies and some ramblas (dry stream beds but in rainy periods).

=== Human geography ===
The inhabitants of the municipality are distributed in the following localities: Fortuna (town), where 7,342 people live; Los Baños, with a population of 740; La Matanza, whose number of inhabitants is 389; La Gineta; where 252 people reside; Las Casicas, which has a population of 111; La Garapacha, where there are 108 residents; Fuente Blanca, where 60 people live; Caprés, which has a population of 57; Hoyahermosa, where 19 people reside; Zafra de Arriba, which has a population of 15 and Zafra de Abajo, where 5 people live.

== Demographics ==
19.64% of the inhabitants are foreigners - 11.6% come from Africa, 6.12% come from other countries of Europe, 167 are Americans, and 27 Asian people reside in the municipality.

	1900	1910	1920	1930	1940	1950	1960	1970	1981	1991	2001	2011
Population	6,552	6,770	6,306	6,681	6,248	5,964	5,707	5,612	5,792	6,004	7,149	9,928

== Facilities ==
=== Healthcare ===
The municipality is included in the Healtharea VI (Vega Media del Segura) of Region of Murcia) and one of its seventeen areas covers the municipality. It hosts a consultorio (primary care centre with fewer functions than the centros de salud) and a centro de salud.

=== Education ===
There are 3 early childhood and primary education centres (CEIP) and one secondary education centre (IES) in the main town. Another CEIP can also be found in La Matanza.

== Economy ==
Agriculture is a relevant economy activity in the municipality. 19.2% of the surface is utilised for this purpose. 35.70% of the contracts took place in this sector in 2019 and 33.23% of workers signed agreements of labourer posts in 2014. The most widely grown products are lemons, almonds, olives and oranges.

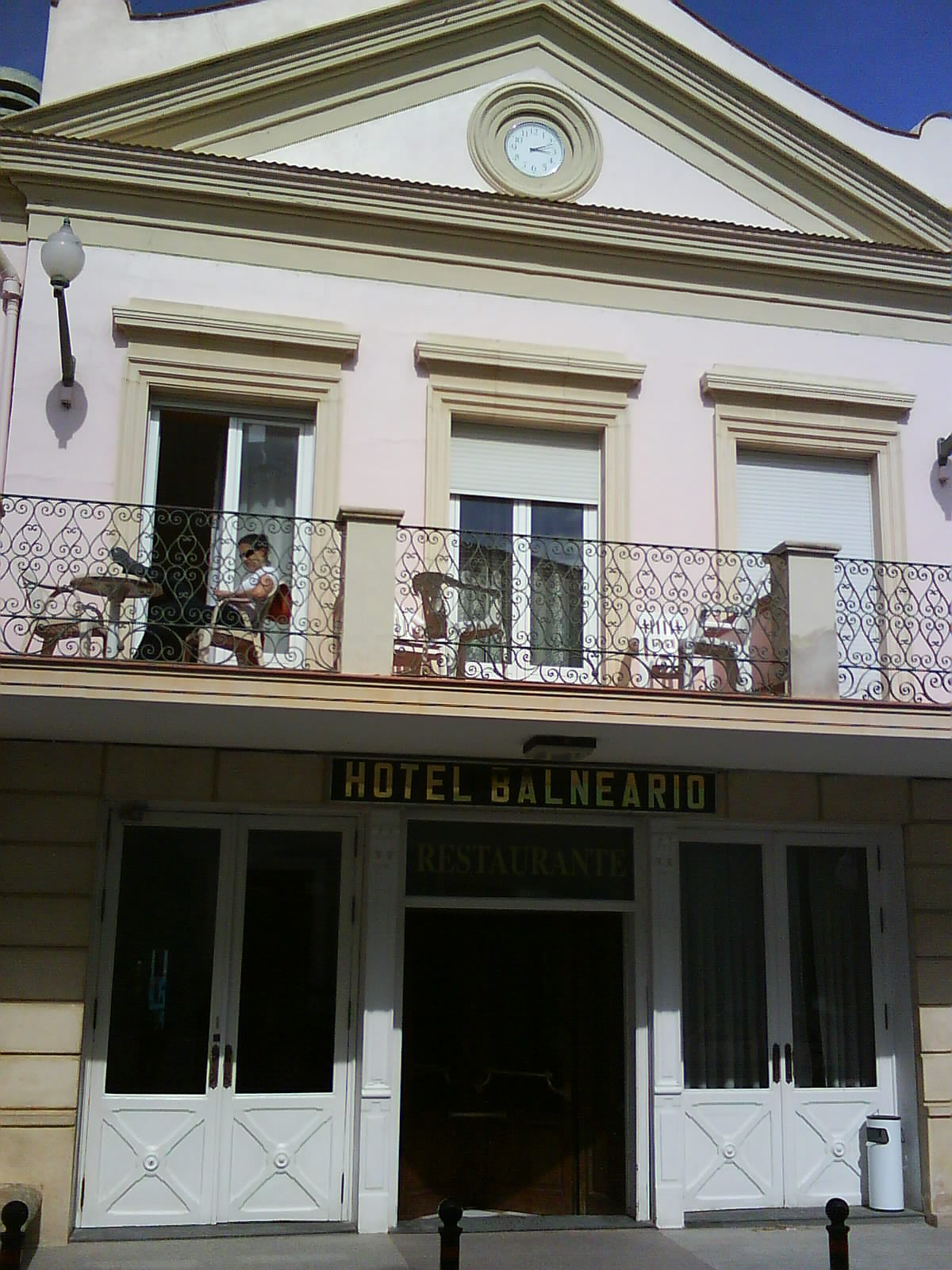
Part of the spa façade.

In regards to the secondary sector, 14% of the agreements that were signed in Fortuna were written for industry activities and 10.68% for labourers. On the other hand, 46.38% of the agreements occurred in the service sector and 9.10% were signed by waiters.

== Main sights ==
These are some of the sites that have historic and artistic values:

- Fortuna spa
- Fortuna casino: It was built from 1896 to 1906 as was intended to be a gambling building for the visitor of the spa of Fortuna.
- Purísima Concepción de Fortuna Church: It emerged in the second quarter of the 18th century and its architectural style is baroque with Murcian regional features. It has a central nave and two aisles. The bell tower has its origin in a reconstruction in 1998.
- Casa Convento: The building was built in the late-19th century and its architectural style is modernist.

== Festivities ==
These are some of the festivities of the municipality:

- Carnival: A pasacalles (a kind of parade which is similar to the standard one) occurs once during the festive days. Another activity that is usually performed is the mask contest.
- Holy Week
- Kalendas Aprili: This event is held the weekend after Resurrection Sunday.
- Fiestas del Fuego
- San Isidro Labrador Festivity: This festivity takes place on the second quarter of May and the reason of this is Isidore the Labourer.
- Patron Saint Festivities: This event is held as a consecration of Saint Roch and occurs on the second third of August. Some activities that are performed are an opening speech, soccer tournaments, caliche (a popular sport of Spain) tournaments, a scavenger hunt named Búsqueda de Lucerna (Lucerna [an Ancient Roman lamp] Seeking), a cow let loose, a parade with an Iberian and Ancient Roman themes and an festivity ending event consisting in lightning a firecracker object named traca.

== See also ==
- List of municipalities in the Region of Murcia
