= Renan Zanelli =

Brazilian footballer

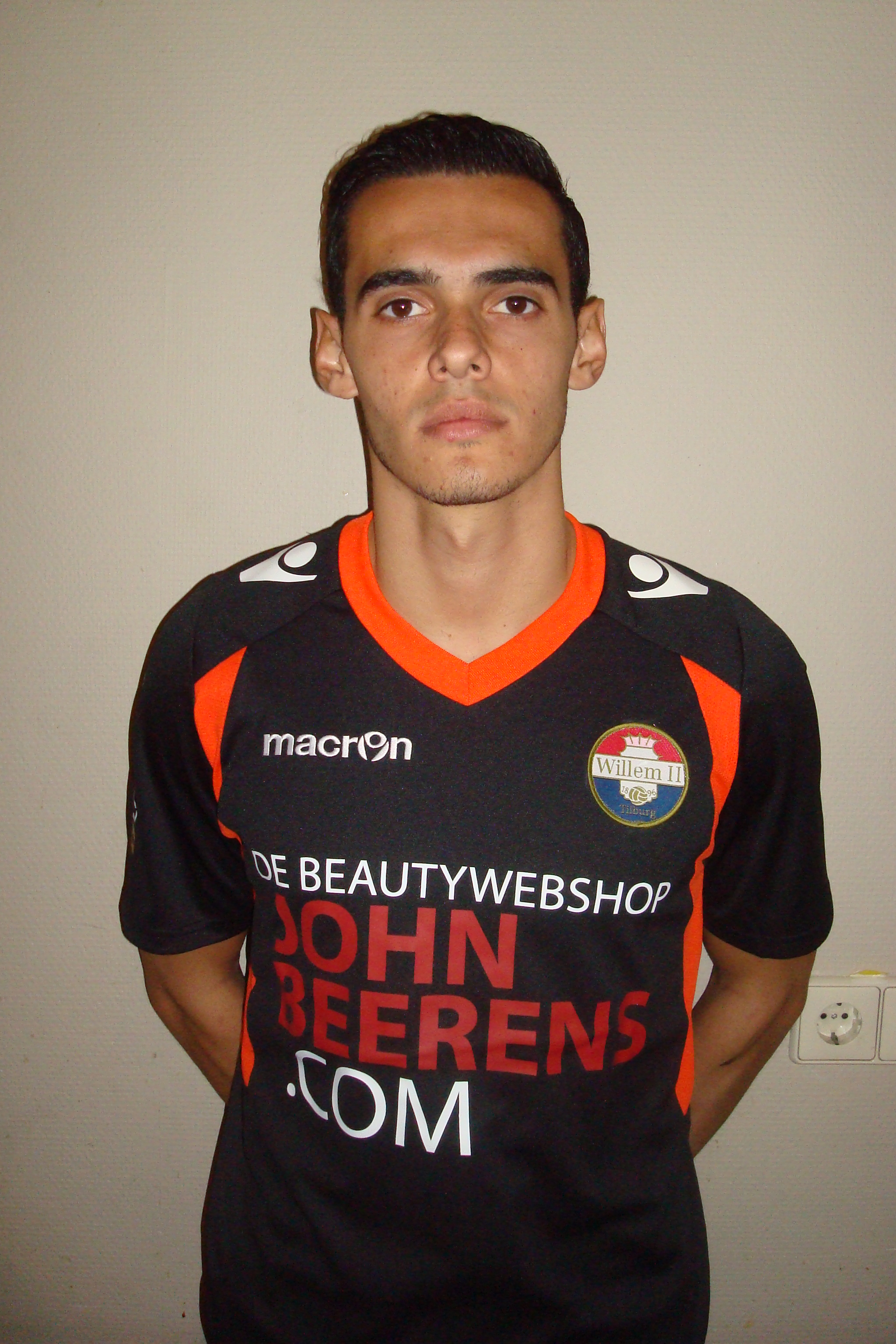
- Renan Zanelli

Personal information
- Full name: Renan Zanelli Consilieri
- Date of birth: 18 May 1992 (age 34)
- Place of birth: São Paulo, Brazil
- Height: 1.80 m (5 ft 11 in)
- Position: Central midfielder

Youth career
- Audax

Senior career*
Years	Team	Apps	(Gls)
2011–2013	Audax	13	(1)
2012–2013	→ Audax Rio (loan)	0	(0)
2013–2015	Willem II	9	(0)
2014	→ TOP Oss (loan)	7	(1)
2015–2016	Audax	2	(0)
2016–2017	Silva		
2017–2018	Ourense		
2018	Piracicaba		
2019–2020	Ourense	2	(1)
2020–2022	Arenteiro	33	(15)
2022–2023	Talavera	32	(3)
- * Club domestic league appearances and goals as of 24 September 2023

Renan Zanelli Consilieri (born 18 May 1992) is a Brazilian professional footballer who currently plays as a central midfielder. He also plays in the positions of attacking midfielder and left winger.
