= CA Espeleño =

Spanish football club

Atlético Espeleño
- Full name: Club Atlético Espeleño
- Founded: 1982
- Ground: Municipal, Espiel, Andalusia, Spain
- Capacity: 1,000
- President: Antonio Úbeda
- Head coach: Juan Carlos Quero
- League: División de Honor – Group 1
- 2024–25: Tercera Federación – Group 10, 17th of 18 (relegated)
| Home colours | Away colours |

Club Atlético Espeleño is a Spanish football team based in Espiel, Córdoba, in the autonomous community of Andalusia. Founded in 1982, it plays in División de Honor – Group 1, holding home matches at Campo Municipal de Espiel, with a capacity of 1,000 people.

== Season to season ==
| Season | Tier | Division | Place | Copa del Rey |
|---|---|---|---|---|
| 1983–84 | 8 | 3ª Reg. | 13th | |
| 1984–85 | 8 | 3ª Reg. | 9th | |
| 1985–86 | 8 | 3ª Reg. | 8th | |
| 1986–87 | 8 | 3ª Reg. | 7th | |
| 1987–88 | 8 | 3ª Reg. | 9th | |
| 1988–89 | 7 | 2ª Reg. | 3rd | |
| 1989–90 | 6 | 1ª Reg. | 11th | |
| 1990–91 | 6 | 1ª Reg. | 4th | |
| 1991–92 | 6 | 1ª Reg. | 6th | |
| 1992–93 | 6 | 1ª Reg. | 1st | |
| 1993–94 | 5 | Reg. Pref. | 13th | |
| 1994–95 | 5 | Reg. Pref. | 12th | |
| 1995–96 | 5 | Reg. Pref. | 4th | |
| 1996–97 | 5 | Reg. Pref. | 2nd | |
| 1997–98 | 5 | Reg. Pref. | 14th | |
| 1998–99 | 5 | Reg. Pref. | 15th | |
| 1999–2000 | 5 | Reg. Pref. | 10th | |
| 2000–01 | DNP | | | |
| 2001–02 | DNP | | | |
| 2002–03 | 6 | 1ª Reg. | 8th | |

| Season | Tier | Division | Place | Copa del Rey |
|---|---|---|---|---|
| 2003–04 | 6 | 1ª Reg. | 3rd | |
| 2004–05 | 6 | Reg. Pref. | 10th | |
| 2005–06 | 6 | Reg. Pref. | 7th | |
| 2006–07 | 6 | Reg. Pref. | 13th | |
| 2007–08 | 6 | Reg. Pref. | 6th | |
| 2008–09 | 6 | Reg. Pref. | 5th | |
| 2009–10 | 6 | Reg. Pref. | 1st | |
| 2010–11 | 5 | 1ª And. | 8th | |
| 2011–12 | 5 | 1ª And. | 12th | |
| 2012–13 | 5 | 1ª And. | 11th | |
| 2013–14 | 5 | 1ª And. | 2nd | |
| 2014–15 | 5 | 1ª And. | 3rd | |
| 2015–16 | 5 | 1ª And. | 1st | |
| 2016–17 | 4 | 3ª | 7th | |
| 2017–18 | 4 | 3ª | 12th | |
| 2018–19 | 4 | 3ª | 21st | |
| 2019–20 | 5 | Div. Hon. | 6th | |
| 2020–21 | 5 | Div. Hon. | 3rd | |
| 2021–22 | 6 | Div. Hon. | 4th | |
| 2022–23 | 5 | 3ª Fed. | 8th | |

| Season | Tier | Division | Place | Copa del Rey |
|---|---|---|---|---|
| 2023–24 | 5 | 3ª Fed. | 14th | |
| 2024–25 | 5 | 3ª Fed. | 17th | |
| 2025–26 | 6 | Div. Hon. | | |

- 3 seasons in Tercera División
- 3 seasons in Tercera Federación
