= 2021–22 FC Cartagena season =

FC Cartagena
2021–22 season
- President: Paco Belmonte
- Head coach: Luis Carrión
- Stadium: Cartagonova
- Segunda División: 9th
- Copa del Rey: Round of 32
- Top goalscorer: League: Rubén Castro (20); All: Rubén Castro (20)
Home colours	Away colours	Third colours

The 2021–22 season was the 27th season in the existence of FC Cartagena and the club's second consecutive season in the second division of Spanish football. In addition to the domestic league, Cartagena participated in this season's edition of the Copa del Rey.

== Players ==
=== First-team squad ===
As of 22 March 2022

Note: Flags indicate national team as defined under FIFA eligibility rules; some limited exceptions apply. Players may hold more than one non-FIFA nationality.

No.	Pos.	Nation	Player
1	GK	ESP	Marc Martínez (vice-captain)
3	DF	ESP	Pedro Alcalá
4	DF	ARG	Julio Buffarini (on loan from Huesca)
5	DF	ESP	Pablo Vázquez
6	MF	FRA	Yann Bodiger
7	FW	ESP	Rubén Castro (3rd captain)
8	MF	ARG	Pablo de Blasis
9	FW	ESP	Alfredo Ortuño
10	FW	ESP	Álex Gallar (on loan from Girona)
12	MF	GHA	Richard Boateng
13	GK	FRA	Jérôme Prior
14	MF	ESP	Alberto Cayarga

No.	Pos.	Nation	Player
15	DF	CRO	Toni Datković
16	FW	JPN	Shinji Okazaki
17	FW	GHA	Mo Dauda (on loan from Anderlecht)
19	DF	ESP	Antonio Luna
20	DF	URU	Gastón Silva
21	MF	ESP	Nacho Gil
22	DF	ESP	Julián Delmás
23	MF	ESP	Sergio Tejera
24	DF	ESP	Alberto de la Bella (captain)
25	MF	URU	Sebastián Cristóforo
28	MF	ESP	Neskes

=== Reserve team ===
Note: Flags indicate national team as defined under FIFA eligibility rules; some limited exceptions apply. Players may hold more than one non-FIFA nationality.

No.	Pos.	Nation	Player
26	DF	ESP	Farru
27	GK	ESP	Sergio Díaz
31	MF	ESP	Xavi Pons
34	FW	ESP	Josema Vivancos

No.	Pos.	Nation	Player
35	MF	ESP	Edu Martínez
36	DF	ESP	Antonio Sánchez
47	MF	ESP	José Manuel

=== Out on loan ===
Note: Flags indicate national team as defined under FIFA eligibility rules; some limited exceptions apply. Players may hold more than one non-FIFA nationality.

No.	Pos.	Nation	Player
—	DF	ARG	Uriel Jové (at Águilas until 30 June 2022)
—	MF	PAN	Adalberto Carrasquilla (at Houston Dynamo until 30 June 2022)

No.	Pos.	Nation	Player
—	MF	ENG	Teddy Sutherland (at Atlético Madrid B until 30 June 2022)

== Pre-season and friendlies ==
Win Draw Loss

3 August 2021 Friendly	Elche	1–1	Cartagena	San Pedro del Pinatar, Spain
19:00 CEST (UTC+2)	Boyé 63'		Castro 76'	Stadium: Pinatar Arena Football Center

== Competitions ==
=== Overall record ===
Competition	First match	Last match	Starting round	Final position	Record							
Competition	First match	Last match	Starting round	Final position	Pld	W	D	L	GF	GA	GD	Win %
Segunda División	16 August 2021	29 May 2022	Matchday 1	9th	42	18	6	18	63	57	+6	42.86
Copa del Rey	30 November 2021	5 January 2022	First round	Round of 32	3	2	0	1	5	3	+2	66.67
Total					45	20	6	19	68	60	+8	44.44

Source: Soccerway

=== Segunda División ===
==== League table ====
Pos	Team	Pld	W	D	L	GF	GA	GD	Pts
7	Oviedo	42	17	17	8	57	41	+16	68 (Note: Girona finished ahead of Oviedo on head-to-head points: Girona 2–1 Oviedo, Oviedo 0–0 Girona.)
8	Ponferradina	42	17	12	13	57	55	+2	63
9	Cartagena	42	18	6	18	63	57	+6	60
10	Zaragoza	42	12	20	10	39	46	−7	56
11	Burgos	42	15	10	17	41	41	0	55

Source: LaLiga SmartBank
Rules for classification: 1) points; 2) head-to-head points; 3) head-to-head goal difference; 4) goal difference; 5) number of goals scored

==== Results summary ====
Overall								Home						Away					
Pld	W	D	L	GF	GA	GD	Pts	W	D	L	GF	GA	GD	W	D	L	GF	GA	GD
42	18	6	18	63	57	+6	60	13	2	6	42	20	+22	5	4	12	21	37	−16

Source: La Liga SmartBank

==== Results by round ====
Round	1	2	3	4	5	6	7	8	9	10	11	12	13	14	15	16	17	18	19	20	21	22	23	24	25	26	27	28	29	30	31	32	33	34	35	36	37	38	39	40	41	42
Ground	H	A	A	H	A	H	A	A	H	A	H	A	H	A	H	A	H	A	H	A	H	A	H	A	H	H	A	H	A	H	A	H	A	H	A	H	H	A	H	A	H	A
Result	L	L	W	W	L	W	L	L	W	W	W	L	L	D	W	L	W	L	D	D	W	W	L	W	W	L	L	L	D	W	L	W	L	L	L	W	W	L	D	D	W	W
Position	20	21	15	9	15	8	13	17	10	8	5	8	10	11	9	11	8	9	10	10	8	8	9	7	6	8	8	9	10	7	9	7	9	10	13	11	9	9	9	9	9	9

Source: La Liga SmartBank
A = Away; H = Home; W = Win; D = Draw; L = Loss

==== Matches ====
The league fixtures were announced on 30 June 2021.

16 August 2021 1	Cartagena	1–3	Almería	Cartagena
22:00 CEST (UTC+2)	Andújar (yellow card) 13'; Luna 49'; Kawaya (yellow card) 90+1'	Report	Buñuel (yellow card) 18'; Sadiq 19', (yellow card) 64'; Ramazani 35', 61'	Stadium: Estadio Cartagonova; Attendance: 4,770; Referee: Aitor Gorostegui Fernández-Ortega

22 August 2021 2	Huesca	2–0	Cartagena	Huesca
22:00 CEST (UTC+2)	Delmás 53' (o.g.); Seoane 73'	Report		Stadium: El Alcoraz; Referee: Daniel Jesús Trujillo Suárez

30 August 2021 3	Zaragoza	0–1	Cartagena	Zaragoza
22:00 CEST (UTC+2)		Report	Gámez 71' (o.g.)	Stadium: La Romareda; Attendance: 10,704; Referee: Saúl Ais Reig

4 September 2021 4	Cartagena	1–0	Real Sociedad B	Cartagena
18:15 CEST (UTC+2)	Ortuño 90+3'	Report		Stadium: Estadio Cartagonova; Referee: Iván Caparrós Hernández

12 September 2021 5	Oviedo	2–0	Cartagena	Oviedo
14:00 CEST (UTC+2)	Bastón 45+3' (pen.); Andújar 57' (o.g.)	Report		Stadium: Carlos Tartiere; Referee: Iosu Galech Apezteguía

18 September 2021 6	Cartagena	2–1	Lugo	Cartagena
21:00 CEST (UTC+2)				Stadium: Estadio Cartagonova

27 September 2021 7	Fuenlabrada	2–1	Cartagena	Fuenlabrada
21:00 CEST (UTC+2)				Stadium: Fernando Torres

3 October 2021 8	Las Palmas	4–1	Cartagena	Las Palmas
18:15 WEST (UTC+1)	Fabio González (yellow card) 23'; Jonathan Viera 32' (pen.); Pejiño 36'; Jesé 43'; Peñaranda 72' (yellow card) 88'; Sergi Cardona (yellow card) 90+1'	Report	David Andújar (yellow card) 25'; Álex Gallar (yellow card) 29'; Boateng (yellow card) 45+4' (yellow-red card) 63'; Dauda 83'	Stadium: Estadio Gran Canaria; Attendance: 11,873; Referee: Oliver De La Fuente

10 October 2021 9	Cartagena	5–1	Ibiza	Cartagena
16:00 CEST (UTC+2)				Stadium: Estadio Cartagonova; Referee: David Gálvez Rascón

16 October 2021 10	Amorebieta	2–3	Cartagena	Lezama
16:00 CEST (UTC+2)				Stadium: Lezama (field 2); Referee: Juan Luis Pulido Santana

19 October 2021 11	Cartagena	1–0	Sporting Gijón	Cartagena
--:-- CEST (UTC+2)				Stadium: Estadio Cartagonova

22 October 2021 12	Eibar	2–1	Cartagena	Eibar
21:00 CEST (UTC+2)	Javi Muñoz 6'; Blanco 9' (yellow card) 90+1'; Toño (red card) 43'	Report	Luna (yellow card) 30'; Delmás (yellow card) 44'; De Blasis 60'; Silva (yellow card) 72'	Stadium: Ipurua; Attendance: 4,097; Referee: Rubén Ávalos Barrera

30 October 2021 13	Cartagena	0–1	Ponferradina	Cartagena
21:00 CEST (UTC+2)			Medina 20'	Stadium: Estadio Cartagonova; Referee: Javier Iglesias Villanueva

2 November 2021 14	Leganés	1–1	Cartagena	Leganés
--:-- CET (UTC+1)				Stadium: Butarque

7 November 2021 15	Cartagena	3–1	Málaga	Cartagena
--:-- CET (UTC+1)				Stadium: Estadio Cartagonova

14 November 2021 16	Girona	2–0	Cartagena	Girona
--:-- CET (UTC+1)				Stadium: Montilivi

21 November 2021 17	Cartagena	1–0	Burgos	Cartagena
--:-- CET (UTC+1)				Stadium: Estadio Cartagonova

27 November 2021 18	Valladolid	2–0	Cartagena	Valladolid
--:-- CET (UTC+1)				Stadium: José Zorrilla

6 December 2021 19	Cartagena	1–1	Tenerife	Cartagena
18:15 CET (UTC+2)	Dauda (yellow card) 55' (yellow-red card) 77'; Álex Gallar 59' (yellow card) 90+2'; Bodiger (yellow card) 90+5'	Report	José León (yellow card) 24'; Aitor Sanz (yellow card) 45'; Mellot (yellow card) 69'; Enric Gallego 87'	Stadium: Estadio Cartagonova; Attendance: 7,441; Referee: Iosu Galech Apezteguía

12 December 2021 20	Alcorcón	1–1	Cartagena	Alcorcón
--:-- CET (UTC+1)				Stadium: Santo Domingo

19 December 2021 21	Cartagena	3–0	Mirandés	Cartagena
--:-- CET (UTC+1)				Stadium: Estadio Cartagonova

2 January 2022 22	Almería	0–1	FC Cartagena	Almería
14:00 CET (UTC+1)		Report	Boateng (yellow card) 35'; Alberto Cayarga (yellow card) 40'; Silva (yellow card) 36' (goal) 39'; Alcalá (yellow card) 50'; De Blasis (yellow card) 65'; Nacho Gil (red card) 90+3'	Stadium: Estadio de los Juegos Mediterráneos; Attendance: 7,058; Referee: Raúl Martín González Francés

8 January 2022 23	Cartagena	0–3	Huesca	Cartagena
--:-- CET (UTC+1)				Stadium: Estadio Cartagonova

24 January 2022 24	Real Sociedad B	1–2	Cartagena	San Sebastián
21:00 CET (UTC+2)	López 53'; Martín (yellow card) 56'	Report	Alcalá (yellow card) 44'; Castro 49'; Dauda 83'	Stadium: Anoeta; Attendance: 985; Referee: Álvaro Moreno

30 January 2022 25	Cartagena	3–0	Fuenlabrada	Cartagena
--:-- CET (UTC+1)				Stadium: Estadio Cartagonova

6 February 2022 26	Cartagena	0–2	Las Palmas	Cartagena
18:15 CET (UTC+2)	Cristóforo (yellow card) 69'; Gastón Silva (yellow card) 74'	Report	Jonathan Viera 17' (pen.); Jesé 28', (yellow card) 87'; Mfulu (yellow card) 39'; Maikel Mesa (yellow card) 67'; Sergi Cardona (yellow card) 90+3'	Stadium: Estadio Cartagonova; Attendance: 9,382; Referee: Oliver De La Fuente

12 February 2022 27	Ibiza	2–1	Cartagena	Málaga
--:-- CET (UTC+1)

18 February 2022 28	Cartagena	2–3	Valladolid	Cartagena
--:-- CET (UTC+1)				Stadium: Estadio Cartagonova

28 February 2022 29	Málaga	1–1	Cartagena	Málaga
--:-- CET (UTC+1)				Stadium: La Rosaleda

6 March 2022 30	Cartagena	4–1	Eibar	Cartagena
18:15 CET (UTC+1)	Bodiger 45' 90+6'; Dauda 52'; Marc Martínez (yellow card) 80'; Alfredo Ortuño 89'; Alcalá (yellow card) 90+4'	Report	Stoichkov 19' (yellow card) 80' (red card) 90+5'; Arbilla (yellow card) 35'; Toño (yellow card) 44'; Miguel Atienza (yellow card) 54'; Fran Sol (yellow card) 57'; Javi Muñoz (yellow card) 77'	Stadium: Estadio Cartagonova; Attendance: 5,097; Referee: Rubén Ávalos Barrera

12 March 2022 31	Mirandés	2–1	Cartagena	Miranda de Ebro
--:-- CET (UTC+1)				Stadium: Anduva

19 March 2022 32	Cartagena	3–0	Zaragoza	Cartagena
--:-- CET (UTC+1)				Stadium: Estadio Cartagonova

26 March 2022 33	Sporting Gijón	4–1	Cartagena	Gijón
--:-- CET (UTC+1)				Stadium: El Molinón

3 April 2022 34	Cartagena	1–2	Oviedo	Cartagena
--:-- CEST (UTC+2)				Stadium: Estadio Cartagonova

8 April 2022 35	Lugo	1–0	Cartagena	Lugo
--:-- CEST (UTC+2)				Stadium: Anxo Carro

16 April 2022 36	Cartagena	3–1	Alcorcón	Cartagena
--:-- CEST (UTC+2)				Stadium: Estadio Cartagonova

23 April 2022 37	Cartagena	3–0	Girona	Cartagena
--:-- CEST (UTC+2)				Stadium: Estadio Cartagonova

1 May 2022 38	Ponferradina	4–2	Cartagena	Ponferrada
--:-- CEST (UTC+2)				Stadium: El Toralín

8 May 2022 39	Cartagena	0–0	Leganés	Cartagena
--:-- CEST (UTC+2)				Stadium: Estadio Cartagonova

14 May 2022 40	Burgos	1–1	Cartagena	Burgos
16:00 CEST (UTC+2)	Valcarce 34'		Delmás 63'	Stadium: El Plantío; Referee: David Gálvez Rascón

21 May 2022 41	Cartagena	5–0	Amorebieta	Cartagena
20:00 CEST (UTC+2)	Castro 18' (pen.), 65', 68'; Bodiger 44'; Gallar 56'			Stadium: Estadio Cartagonova; Referee: Víctor García Verdura

29 May 2022 42	Tenerife	1–2	Cartagena	Santa Cruz de Tenerife
19:00 WEST (UTC+1)	Aitor Sanz (yellow card) 11'; Víctor Mollejo (yellow card) 38'; Enric Gallego (yellow card) 61'; Šipčić 63'; Míchel (yellow card) 70'; Carlos Ruiz (yellow card) 72'	Report	Alfredo Ortuño 12' (pen.); Buffarini 22'; De Blasis (yellow card) 71'	Stadium: Heliodoro Rodríguez López; Attendance: 14,525; Referee: Iosu Galech Apezteguía

=== Copa del Rey ===
30 November 2021 First round	Racing Rioja	0–2	Cartagena	Logroño (Note: Racing Rioja played its game at Las Gaunas, in Logroño instead of their regular stadium El Salvador as it does not meet the requirements established by the Royal Spanish Football Federation.)
20:00		Report	Ortuño 65', 81'	Stadium: Las Gaunas; Referee: José Antonio López Toca

15 December 2021 Second round	Castellón	1–2	Cartagena	Castellón de la Plana
20:00	Sibille 48'	Report	Ortuño 28'; Cayarga 90+3'	Stadium: Castàlia; Referee: David Gálvez Rascón

5 January 2022 Round of 32	Cartagena	1–2	Valencia	Cartagena
16:00	Ortuño 75' (pen.)	Report	Soler 35'; Cheryshev 90+2'	Stadium: Cartagonova; Referee: Pablo González Fuertes
