= 2020–21 FC Cartagena season =

FC Cartagena
2020–21 season
- President: Paco Belmonte
- Head coach: Borja Jiménez
- Stadium: Cartagonova
- Segunda División: 16th
- Copa del Rey: First round
Home colours	Away colours

The 2020–21 season was Fútbol Club Cartagena's 26th season in existence and the club's first season back in the second division of Spanish football. In addition to the domestic league, Cartagena participated in this season's edition of the Copa del Rey. The season covered the period from 26 July 2020 to 30 June 2021.

== Players ==
=== First-team squad ===
Note: Flags indicate national team as defined under FIFA eligibility rules; some limited exceptions apply. Players may hold more than one non-FIFA nationality.

No.	Pos.	Nation	Player
1	GK	ESP	Marc Martínez
2	DF	ESP	David Andújar (captain)
3	DF	ESP	David Forniés
4	DF	BFA	Yacouba Coulibaly
5	DF	ESP	Raúl Navas
6	DF	CRO	Toni Datković (on loan from Aris Thessaloniki)
7	FW	ESP	Rubén Castro
8	MF	ARG	Pablo de Blasis
9	FW	ESP	Cristian López (on loan from Aris Thessaloniki)
10	MF	ESP	Álex Gallar (on loan from Girona)
11	FW	ESP	Elady Zorrilla
12	MF	NGR	Ramon Azeez (on loan from Granada)
14	MF	ESP	Alberto Cayarga
15	DF	ESP	David Simón

No.	Pos.	Nation	Player
16	MF	ESP	José Ángel (3rd captain)
17	MF	GEO	Giorgi Aburjania
18	MF	PAN	Adalberto Carrasquilla
19	DF	ESP	Antoñito
20	DF	ESP	Carlos David
21	MF	ESP	Pablo Clavería
22	DF	ESP	Julián Delmás
23	MF	ESP	Nacho Gil
24	DF	ESP	Alberto de la Bella (on loan from Las Palmas)
25	GK	ARG	Leandro Chichizola
26	MF	ALB	Kleandro Lleshi
27	GK	ESP	Esteve Peña
30	DF	ARG	Uriel Jové

=== Reserve team ===
Note: Flags indicate national team as defined under FIFA eligibility rules; some limited exceptions apply. Players may hold more than one non-FIFA nationality.

No.	Pos.	Nation	Player
28	GK	ESP	Sergio Díaz
42	FW	ESP	David Santisteban

No.	Pos.	Nation	Player
45	MF	ENG	Teddy Sutherland

=== Out on loan ===
Note: Flags indicate national team as defined under FIFA eligibility rules; some limited exceptions apply. Players may hold more than one non-FIFA nationality.

No.	Pos.	Nation	Player
—	FW	BRA	Vinicius Tanque (at Atlético Baleares until 30 June 2021)

== Pre-season and friendlies ==
Win Draw Loss

26 August 2020 Friendly	Cartagena	0–1	Leganés	San Pedro del Pinatar, Spain
10:00 CEST (UTC+2)			Merino 73' (pen.)	Stadium: Pinatar Arena; Referee: David Gálvez Rascón

2 September 2020 Friendly	Levante	2–1	Cartagena	San Pedro del Pinatar, Spain
19:30 CEST (UTC+2)				Stadium: Pinatar Arena

5 September 2020 Friendly	Valencia	3–1	Cartagena	Paterna, Spain
18:00 CEST (UTC+2)	Lee Kang-in 69', 80'; Jason 73'		Gabriel 64' (o.g.)	Stadium: Ciudad Deportiva de Paterna; Attendance: 0

== Competitions ==
=== Overview ===
Competition	First match	Last match	Starting round	Final position	Record							
Competition	First match	Last match	Starting round	Final position	Pld	W	D	L	GF	GA	GD	Win %
Segunda División	13 September 2020	30 May 2021	Matchday 1	16th	42	12	13	17	44	52	−8	28.57
Copa del Rey	17 December 2020		First round	First round	1	0	0	1	1	2	−1	0.00
Total					43	12	13	18	45	54	−9	27.91

Source: Soccerway

=== Segunda División ===
==== League table ====
Pos	Team	Pld	W	D	L	GF	GA	GD	Pts
14	Tenerife	42	13	13	16	36	36	0	52 (Note: Head-to-head points: Oviedo: 4, Tenerife: 1)
15	Zaragoza	42	13	11	18	37	43	−6	50
16	Cartagena	42	12	13	17	44	52	−8	49
17	Alcorcón	42	13	9	20	32	42	−10	48
18	Lugo	42	11	14	17	38	53	−15	47

Source: LaLiga
Rules for classification: 1) points; 2) head-to-head points; 3) head-to-head goal difference; 4) goal difference; 5) number of goals scored

==== Results summary ====
Overall								Home						Away					
Pld	W	D	L	GF	GA	GD	Pts	W	D	L	GF	GA	GD	W	D	L	GF	GA	GD
42	12	13	17	44	52	−8	49	8	7	6	27	23	+4	4	6	11	17	29	−12

Source: La Liga

==== Results by round ====
Round	1	2	3	4	5	6	7	8	9	10	11	12	13	14	15	16	17	18	19	20	21	22	23	24	25	26	27	28	29	30	31	32	33	34	35	36	37	38	39	40	41	42
Ground	A	H	A	H	A	H	A	H	A	H	H	A	A	H	A	H	A	H	A	H	A	H	A	H	H	A	H	A	H	A	H	A	H	A	H	A	A	H	A	H	A	H
Result	D	L	L	W	W	D	D	W	L	W	L	L	L	L	D	L	W	L	L	D	L	L	D	W	D	L	W	L	D	L	D	D	W	D	D	W	L	W	W	W	L	D
Position	9	15	19	13	10	12	10	8	11	7	11	15	16	16	16	16	16	16	17	17	19	21	21	19	19	20	17	19	20	20	21	21	19	19	19	18	20	16	16	16	16	16

Source: La Liga
A = Away; H = Home; W = Win; D = Draw; L = Loss

==== Matches ====
The league fixtures were announced on 31 August 2020.

13 September 2020 1	Oviedo	0–0	Cartagena	Oviedo
12:00 CEST (UTC+2)	González (yellow card) 52'; Teguia (yellow card) 90+7'	Report	Verza (yellow card) 7'; Moreno (yellow card) 25'; Martín (yellow card) 41'; Andújar (yellow card) 90+5'	Stadium: Carlos Tartiere; Attendance: 0 (Note: The match was played behind closed doors due to the COVID-19 pandemic in Spain.); Referee: Javier Iglesias Villanueva

20 September 2020 2	Cartagena	0–1	Sporting Gijón	Cartagena
18:15 CEST (UTC+2)	Carrasquilla (yellow card) 55'; Andújar (yellow card) 84' (yellow-red card) 90'	Report	Gragera 72'; Carmona (yellow card) 78'	Stadium: Cartagonova; Attendance: 0 Referee: Miguel Ángel Ortiz Arias

27 September 2020 3	Leganés	3–1	Cartagena	Leganés
20:30 CEST (UTC+2)	Rosales 24'; Merino 30', 40', (yellow card) 90+2'; Perea (yellow card) 35'; Pérez (yellow card) 69'; Bastón (yellow card) 90+2'	Report	Uriel (yellow card) 45+1'; Castro 50'; Zorrilla (yellow card) 90+5'	Stadium: Estadio Municipal de Butarque; Attendance: 0 Referee: Saúl Ais Reig

4 October 2020 4	Cartagena	2–1	Lugo	Cartagena
20:30 CEST (UTC+2)	Zorrilla (yellow card) 1', (goal) 29'; Simón (yellow card) 35'; Gallar 61'; De la Bella (yellow card) 84'	Report	Seoane (yellow card) 27'; Campabadal (yellow card) 31'; Djaló (yellow card) 66'; Domínguez (yellow card) 68'; Carrillo 88'; Torres (yellow card) 90+5'	Stadium: Cartagonova; Attendance: 0 Referee: Francisco José Hernández Maeso

11 October 2020 5	Ponferradina	0–2	Cartagena	Ponferrada
18:30 CEST (UTC+2)	Valcarce (yellow card) 30'; Adot (yellow card) 90'; Amo (yellow card) 90+2'	Report	Simón (yellow card) 51'; Andújar (yellow card) 52'; Jurado 57', (yellow card) 74'; Zorrilla 60'; Gil (yellow card) 62'	Stadium: El Toralín; Attendance: 0 Referee: Álvaro Moreno Aragón

17 October 2020 6	Cartagena	1–1	Fuenlabrada	Cartagena
18:15 CEST (UTC+2)	Zorrilla (yellow card) 53'; Jurado (yellow card) 58'; Castro 63'; Andújar (yellow card) 73'	Report	Mula (yellow card) 24'; Moi (yellow card) 38'; Diéguez (yellow card) 53'; Feuillassier 66'; Iribas (yellow card) 90+3'; Nteka (yellow card) 90+5'	Stadium: Cartagonova; Attendance: 0 Referee: Daniel Ocón Arráiz

21 October 2020 7	Almería	1–1	Cartagena	Almería
21:30 CEST (UTC+2)	Maraš (yellow card) 14'; De la Hoz (yellow card) 35'; Balliu (yellow card) 61'; Sadiq 65'	Report	Castro 17'; Forniés (yellow card) 62'	Stadium: Estadio de los Juegos Mediterráneos; Attendance: 0 Referee: David Gálvez Rascón

24 October 2020 8	Cartagena	3–0	Las Palmas	Cartagena
18:15 CEST (UTC+2)	Castro 25' (pen.); Andújar (yellow card) 31'; Martín 41'; Gil (yellow card) 45+4'; De la Bella (yellow card) 52'; Aguza (yellow card) 70'; Carrasquilla 88'	Report	Lemos (yellow card) 45+3' (yellow-red card) 90'; Loiodice (yellow card) 60'; Suárez (yellow card) 89'	Stadium: Cartagonova; Attendance: 0 Referee: Rubén Ávalos Barrera

27 October 2020 9	Girona	2–1	FC Cartagena	Girona
19:00 CET (UTC+1)	Sylla 7' 66'; Cristóforo (yellow card) 52'	Report	Castro 23'; Forniés (red card) 38'; Jurado (yellow card) 68'; Carrasquilla (yellow card) 80'; Martín (red card) 90+3'	Stadium: Estadi Municipal de Montilivi; Attendance: 0 Referee: Javier Iglesias Villanueva

31 October 2020 10	Cartagena	3–1	Albacete	Cartagena
16:00 CET (UTC+1)	Castro 8', 41'; Andújar 32'; De la Bella (yellow card) 64'; Carrasquilla (yellow card) 86'	Report	Jiménez (yellow card) 26'; Israfilov (yellow card) 31'; Peña (yellow card) 57'; Azamoum (yellow card) 59'; Beltrán 66'	Stadium: Cartagonova; Attendance: 0 Referee: Álvaro Moreno Aragón

7 November 2020 11	Cartagena	0–1	UD Logroñés	Cartagena
16:00 CET (UTC+1)	Simón (yellow card) 33'	Report	Vitoria 84'	Stadium: Cartagonova; Attendance: 0 Referee: Aitor Gorostegui Fernández Ortega

15 November 2020 12	Castellón	2–1	Cartagena	Castellón
18:30 CET (UTC+1)	Señé (yellow card) 40'; Fidalgo (yellow card) 51'; Jamelli 64', 76'; Díaz (yellow card) 79'; Campos (yellow card) 90+2'	Report	Aguza (yellow card) 69'; Castro 80'; Gil (yellow card) 90+1'	Stadium: Nou Estadi Castàlia; Attendance: 0 Referee: Oliver De La Fuente

21 November 2020 13	Mirandés	4–1	Cartagena	Miranda de Ebro
16:00 CET (UTC+1)		Report		Stadium: Estadio Municipal de Anduva; Attendance: 0 Referee: Iosu Galech Apezteguía

25 November 2020 14	Cartagena	1–2	Mallorca	Cartagena
21:30 CET (UTC+1)	José Jurado (yellow card) 13'; David (yellow card) 71', (red card) 78'; Harper (yellow card) 75'; Rhyner (yellow card) 83'; Zorrilla 90'; Gallar (yellow card) 90+3'	Report	Baba (yellow card) 12'; Rodríguez 69' (pen.); Junior 81' (pen.); Reina (yellow card) 90+2'	Stadium: Estadio Cartagonova; Attendance: 0 Referee: Rubén Ávalos Barrera

28 November 2020 15	Rayo Vallecano	0–0	Cartagena	Madrid
18:15 CET (UTC+1)		Report		Stadium: Vallecas; Attendance: 0 Referee: Daniel Ocón Arráiz

2 December 2020 16	Cartagena	1–3	Espanyol	Cartagena
19:00 CET (UTC+1)	Simón (yellow card) 18'; Carrasquilla (yellow card) 42'; Zorrilla 47'	Report	Bare (yellow card) 27'; Pedrosa (yellow card) 41'; Melamed 75'; De Tomás 80' (pen.); Puado 85'	Stadium: Estadio Cartagonova; Attendance: 0 Referee: Dámaso Arcediano Monescillo

5 December 2020 17	Málaga	1–2	Cartagena	Málaga
20:30 CET (UTC+1)	Martínez 17' (o.g.)	Report	Gallar 29'; De la Bella 58'	Stadium: La Rosaleda; Attendance: 0 Referee: Juan Luis Pulido Santana

13 December 2020 18	Cartagena	1–2	Sabadell	Cartagena
18:30 CET (UTC+1)	Castro 62'	Report	Guruzeta 78'; Carlos David 83' (o.g.)	Stadium: Estadio Cartagonova; Attendance: 0 Referee: Iosu Galech Apezteguía

20 December 2020 19	Alcorcón	2–1	Cartagena	Alcorcón
14:00 CET (UTC+1)	Escobar (yellow card) 13'; Fernández (yellow card) 34'; Gual 40'; José León 45+1'; Gómez (yellow card) 88'	Report	De la Bella (yellow card) 21'; Delmás (yellow card) 56'; Clavería (yellow card) 80'; Carrasquilla (yellow card) 86'; Zorrilla 90+3'	Stadium: Santo Domingo; Attendance: 0 Referee: Aitor Gorostegui Fernández Ortega

2 January 2021 20	Cartagena	1–1	Zaragoza	Cartagena
20:30 CET (UTC+1)	José Ángel (yellow card) 34'; Andújar 60'; Aguza (yellow card) 66'; Carlos David (yellow card) 84'	Report	Vigaray (yellow card) 24'; Azón 81'; Zapater (yellow card) 90'; Igbekeme (yellow card) 90+2'	Stadium: Estadio Cartagonova; Attendance: 0 Referee: Saúl Ais Reig

10 January 2021 21	Tenerife	3–0	Cartagena	Santa Cruz de Tenerife
18:15 CET (UTC+1)	Sol 13' (pen.), 74'; Shashoua 54'	Report		Stadium: Heliodoro Rodríguez López; Attendance: 0 Referee: Alejandro Muñiz Ruiz

25 January 2021 22	Cartagena	0–2	Mirandés	Cartagena
21:00 CET (UTC+1)		Report		Stadium: Cartagonova; Attendance: 0 Referee: Miguel Ángel Ortiz Arias

31 January 2021 23	Sporting Gijón	0–0	Cartagena	Gijón
14:00 CET (UTC+1)		Report		Stadium: El Molinón; Attendance: 0 Referee: José Antonio López Toca

6 February 2021 24	Cartagena	2–0	Oviedo	Cartagena
16:00 CET (UTC+1)	Castro 33'; Cayarga 71'	Report		Stadium: Cartagonova; Attendance: 0 Referee: Juan Luis Pulido Santana

13 February 2021 25	Cartagena	2–2	Rayo Vallecano	Cartagena
16:00 CET (UTC+1)		Report		Stadium: Estadio Cartagonova; Attendance: 0 Referee: Aitor Gorostegui Fernández-Ortega

20 February 2021 26	Las Palmas	2–0	Cartagena	Las Palmas
20:30 CET (UTC+2)	Mújica (yellow card) 7'; Mesa 14' (pen.), (yellow card) 38'; Pejiño 19'; Araujo (yellow card) 34'; Díez (yellow card) 52'	Report	Navas (yellow card) 65'; Aburjania (yellow card) 74'	Stadium: Estadio Gran Canaria; Attendance: 0 Referee: Francisco José Hernández Maeso

26 February 2021 27	Cartagena	1–0	Leganés	Cartagena
21:00 CET (UTC+1)	Castro 57'	Report		Stadium: Cartagonova; Attendance: 0 Referee: Jon Ander González Esteban

7 March 2021 28	Mallorca	2–1	Cartagena	Palma
18:15 CET (UTC+1)	Baba (yellow card) 24'; Rodríguez (yellow card) 43'; Amath 45+1'; Raíllo (yellow card) 71'; Giménez 81' (pen.)	Report	Aburjania (yellow card) 33'; Forniés 64'; Azeez (yellow card) 73'; Andújar (yellow card) 80'; Carrasquilla (yellow card) 90+1'	Stadium: Visit Mallorca Stadium; Attendance: 0 Referee: Rubén Ávalos Barrera

12 March 2021 29	Cartagena	1–1	Ponferradina	Cartagena
19:00 CET (UTC+1)		Report		Stadium: Cartagonova; Attendance: 0 Referee: David Gálvez Rascón

22 March 2021 30	Albacete	2–0	Cartagena	Albacete
19:00 CET (UTC+1)	Ortuño 21'; Torres 57'; Mvondo (yellow card) 90+2'	Report	De la Torre (yellow card) 14'; Forniés (yellow card) 77'; Antoñito (yellow card) 80'	Stadium: Carlos Belmonte; Attendance: 0 Referee: Eduardo Prieto Iglesias

27 March 2021 31	Cartagena	1–1	Málaga	Cartagena
20:30 CET (UTC+1)	Cayarga 14'	Report	Jozabed 81'	Stadium: Cartagonova; Attendance: 0 Referee: Alejandro Muñiz Ruiz

1 April 2021 32	Zaragoza	0–0	Cartagena	Zaragoza
21:30 CEST (UTC+2)	Narváez (yellow card) 53'; Peybernes (yellow card) 74'	Report	Andújar (yellow card) 46'; Cayarga (yellow card) 75'	Stadium: La Romareda; Attendance: 0 Referee: Juan Luis Pulido Santana

5 April 2021 33	Cartagena	2–1	Alcorcón	Cartagena
18:00 CEST (UTC+2)	Andújar 5'; Cristian 34'	Report	Arribas 49'	Stadium: Cartagonova; Attendance: 0 Referee: Luis Mario Milla Alvendiz

11 April 2021 34	Sabadell	1–1	Cartagena	Sabadell
16:15 CEST (UTC+2)	Stoichkov 21'	Report	Castro 53'	Stadium: Nova Creu Alta; Attendance: 0 Referee: Álvaro Moreno Aragón

18 April 2021 35	Cartagena	0–0	Tenerife	Cartagena
18:15 CEST (UTC+2)		Report		Stadium: Cartagonova; Attendance: 0 Referee: Óliver de la Fuente Ramos

24 April 2021 36	UD Logroñés	0–1	Cartagena	Logroño
16:00 CEST (UTC+2)		Report	Elady 63' (pen.)	Stadium: Las Gaunas; Attendance: 0 Referee: Daniel Jesús Trujillo Suárez

2 May 2021 37	Fuenlabrada	2–1	Cartagena	Fuenlabrada
14:00 CEST (UTC+2)	Garcés 14'; Rosić (red card) 45+3'; Ciss 48', (yellow card) 75'; Salvador (red card) 67'	Report	Zorrilla (yellow card) 52'; Castro 77'	Stadium: Fernando Torres; Attendance: 0 Referee: Alejandro Muñíz Ruiz

9 May 2021 38	Cartagena	1–0	Castellón	Cartagena
16:15 CEST (UTC+2)	Castro 55'	Report		Stadium: Cartagonova; Attendance: 0 Referee: Rubén Ávalos Barrera

14 May 2021 39	Espanyol	0–2	Cartagena	Cornellà de Llobregat
21:00 CEST (UTC+2)	Embarba (yellow card) 55'; Cabrera (yellow card) 90+3'	Report	Delmás 22'; Castro 52' (pen.)	Stadium: RCDE Stadium; Attendance: 0 Referee: Iñaki Vicandi Garrido

18 May 2021 40	Cartagena	3–2	Almería	Cartagena
19:00 CEST (UTC+2)	Delmás (yellow card) 21'; José Ángel (yellow card) 25'; Castro 41', 47'; Navas (yellow card) 66'; De Blasis 82' (pen.), (yellow card) 83'; Elady (yellow card) 90+3'	Report	Costa (yellow card) 36'; Sadiq 45+1'; Ramazani 54' (pen.), (yellow card) 76'; Makaridze (yellow card) 81'	Stadium: Cartagonova; Attendance: 0 Referee: Javier Iglesias Villanueva

24 May 2021 41	Lugo	2–1	Cartagena	Lugo
21:00 CEST (UTC+2)	Valentín 19', 67'	Report	José Ángel 72'	Stadium: Anxo Carro; Attendance: 0 Referee: Miguel Ángel Ortiz Arias

30 May 2021 42	Cartagena	1–1	Girona	Cartagena
21:00 CEST (UTC+2)	Carrasquilla (yellow card) 3'; De Blasis 60'; Antoñito (yellow card) 80'; José Ángel (yellow card) 82'	Report	Bueno (yellow card) 20'; Aday (yellow card) 36'; Valery 79'	Stadium: Cartagonova; Attendance: 0 Referee: Daniel Jesús Trujillo Suárez

=== Copa del Rey ===
17 December 2020 First round	Pontevedra	2–1	Cartagena	Pontevedra
20:00 CET (UTC+1)	González 24'; Calvillo 65'	Report	Elady 82'	Stadium: Pasarón; Referee: Óliver de la Fuente Ramos
