= 2019–20 CD Leganés season =

CD Deportivo Leganés 2019–20 football season

Leganés
2019–20 season
- President: María Victoria Pavón
- Head coach: Mauricio Pellegrino (until 21 October); Luis Cembranos (interim, 21 October to 4 November); Javier Aguirre (from 4 November)
- Stadium: Estadio Municipal de Butarque
- La Liga: 18th (relegated)
- Copa del Rey: Round of 16
- Top goalscorer: League: Óscar (9); All: Óscar (9)
- Highest home attendance: 11,742 (vs Atlético Madrid, 25 August 2019)
- Lowest home attendance: 7,115 (vs Celta Vigo, 8 December 2019)
- Average home league attendance: 10,051
- Biggest win: Murcia 0–4 Leganés
- Biggest defeat: Real Madrid 5–0 Leganés; Barcelona 5–0 Leganés
| Home colours | Away colours | Third colours |

The 2019–20 season was Club Deportivo Leganés' 79th season in existence and the club's 4th consecutive season in the top flight of Spanish football. In addition to the domestic league, Leganés participated in this season's edition of the Copa del Rey. The season was slated to cover a period from 1 July 2019 to 30 June 2020. It was extended extraordinarily beyond 30 June due to the COVID-19 pandemic in Spain. Overall, the team suffered relegation to the LaLiga SmartBank, when they were so close to a great escape.

== Players ==
=== Current squad ===
As of 20 February 2020

Note: Flags indicate national team as defined under FIFA eligibility rules; some limited exceptions apply. Players may hold more than one non-FIFA nationality.

| No. | Pos. | Nation | Player |
|---|---|---|---|
| 1 | GK | ESP | Iván Cuéllar |
| 2 | DF | ESP | Marc Navarro (on loan from Watford) |
| 3 | DF | ESP | Unai Bustinza (Captain) |
| 4 | DF | NGR | Kenneth Omeruo |
| 5 | DF | ARG | Jonathan Silva |
| 6 | MF | ESP | Roque Mesa (on loan from Sevilla) |
| 8 | MF | ESP | Recio |
| 9 | FW | ESP | Miguel Ángel Guerrero (on loan from Olympiacos) |
| 11 | MF | ARG | Alexander Szymanowski |
| 12 | DF | NGR | Chidozie Awaziem (on loan from Porto) |
| 13 | GK | ESP | Juan Soriano (on loan from Sevilla) |
| 15 | DF | ESP | Rodrigo Tarín |

| No. | Pos. | Nation | Player |
|---|---|---|---|
| 16 | DF | VEN | Roberto Rosales |
| 17 | MF | ESP | Javier Eraso |
| 18 | FW | ARG | Guido Carrillo (on loan from Southampton) |
| 19 | FW | ESP | Aitor Ruibal (on loan from Real Betis) |
| 20 | FW | CIV | Roger Assalé (on loan from Young Boys) |
| 21 | MF | ESP | Rubén Pérez (Vice-captain) |
| 22 | DF | GRE | Dimitris Siovas (3rd captain) |
| 23 | MF | FRA | Ibrahim Amadou (on loan from Sevilla) |
| 24 | DF | POR | Kévin Rodrigues (on loan from Real Sociedad) |
| 26 | FW | ESP | Bryan Gil (on loan from Sevilla) |
| 27 | MF | ESP | Óscar (on loan from Real Madrid) |

=== Reserve team ===
Note: Flags indicate national team as defined under FIFA eligibility rules; some limited exceptions apply. Players may hold more than one non-FIFA nationality.

| No. | Pos. | Nation | Player |
|---|---|---|---|
| 28 | MF | ESP | Iván López |
| 29 | DF | MAR | Aymane Mourid |
| 30 | GK | BRA | André Grandi |

| No. | Pos. | Nation | Player |
|---|---|---|---|
| 31 | FW | ESP | Dani Plomer |
| 32 | DF | ESP | Mario |
| 33 | FW | ESP | Javier Avilés |

=== Out on loan ===
Note: Flags indicate national team as defined under FIFA eligibility rules; some limited exceptions apply. Players may hold more than one non-FIFA nationality.

| No. | Pos. | Nation | Player |
|---|---|---|---|
| — | DF | MAR | Jaouad Erraji (at Pontevedra until 30 June 2020) |
| — | DF | UKR | Vasyl Kravets (at Lugo until 30 June 2020) |
| — | DF | ESP | Álex Martín (at Cartagena until 30 June 2020) |
| — | DF | VEN | Josua Mejías (at Atlético Madrid B until 30 June 2020) |
| — | MF | ARG | Facundo García (at AEK Larnaca until 30 June 2020) |
| — | MF | ALB | Kleandro Lleshi (at Recreativo until 30 June 2020) |

| No. | Pos. | Nation | Player |
|---|---|---|---|
| — | MF | ARG | Fede Varela (at Las Palmas until 30 June 2020) |
| — | FW | ESP | José Arnaiz (at Osasuna until 30 June 2020) |
| — | FW | CIV | Mamadou Koné (at Deportivo La Coruña until 30 June 2020) |
| — | FW | ESP | Juan Muñoz (at Almería until 30 June 2020) |
| — | FW | ESP | Dani Ojeda (at Albacete until 30 June 2020) |
| — | FW | BRA | William (at Cartagena until 30 June 2020) |

== Transfers ==
=== In ===
| Date | Player | From | Type | Fee | Ref |
|---|---|---|---|---|---|
| 30 June 2019 | (Argentina) Facundo García | (Cyprus) AEK Larnaca | Loan return | | |
| 30 June 2019 | (Ivory Coast) Mamadou Koné | Málaga | Loan return | | |
| 30 June 2019 | (Ghana) Owusu Kwabena | Salamanca | Loan return | | |
| 30 June 2019 | (Venezuela) Josua Mejías | Gimnàstic | Loan return | | |
| 30 June 2019 | (Spain) Dani Ojeda | Granada | Loan return | | |
| 1 July 2019 | (Spain) Juan Muñoz | Alcorcón | Transfer | €1M | |
| 1 July 2019 | (Argentina) Jonathan Silva | (Portugal) Sporting CP | Buyout clause | €3,000,000 | |
| 1 July 2019 | (Brazil) André Grandi | Internacional Madrid | Transfer | Free | |
| 4 July 2019 | (Spain) Aitor Ruibal | Real Betis | Loan | | |
| 4 July 2019 | (Argentina) Federico Varela | (Portugal) Porto B | Transfer | Undisclosed | |
| 5 July 2019 | (Spain) Juan Soriano | Sevilla | Loan | | |
| 8 July 2019 | (Spain) Álex Martín | Real Madrid Castilla | Transfer | Undisclosed | |
| 24 July 2019 | (Denmark) Martin Braithwaite | (England) Middlesbrough | Buyout clause | Undisclosed | |
| 24 July 2019 | (Spain) Marc Navarro | (England) Watford | Loan | | |
| 24 July 2019 | (Venezuela) Roberto Rosales | Málaga | Transfer | €1,200,000 | |
| 13 August 2019 | (Spain) Roque Mesa | Sevilla | Loan | | |
| 13 August 2019 | (Nigeria) Kenneth Omeruo | (England) Chelsea | Transfer | €5,000,000 | |
| 15 August 2019 | (Nigeria) Chidozie Awaziem | (Portugal) Porto | Loan | | |
| 1 September 2019 | (Argentina) Guido Carrillo | (England) Southampton | Loan | | |
| 2 September 2019 | (Spain) Christian Rivera | Las Palmas | Loan | | |
| 2 September 2019 | (Portugal) Kévin Rodrigues | Real Sociedad | Loan | | |
| 23 January 2020 | (Ghana) Owusu Kwabena | Córdoba | Loan return | | |
| 31 January 2020 | (France) Ibrahim Amadou | Sevilla | Loan | | |
| 31 January 2020 | (Ivory Coast) Roger Assalé | (Switzerland) Young Boys | Loan | | |
| 31 January 2020 | (Spain) Bryan Gil | Sevilla | Loan | | |
| 31 January 2020 | (Spain) Miguel Ángel Guerrero | (Greece) Olympiacos | Loan | | |

=== Out ===
| Date | Player | To | Type | Fee | Ref |
|---|---|---|---|---|---|
| 30 June 2019 | (Argentina) Guido Carrillo | (England) Southampton | Loan return | | |
| 30 June 2019 | (Spain) Juanfran | Deportivo La Coruña | Loan return | | |
| 30 June 2019 | (Ukraine) Andriy Lunin | Real Madrid | Loan return | | |
| 30 June 2019 | (Spain) Sabin Merino | Athletic Bilbao | Loan return | | |
| 30 June 2019 | (Cameroon) Allan Nyom | (England) West Bromwich Albion | Loan return | | |
| 30 June 2019 | (Nigeria) Kenneth Omeruo | (England) Chelsea | Loan return | | |
| 30 June 2019 | (Spain) Óscar | Real Madrid Castilla | Loan return | | |
| 30 June 2019 | (Mexico) Diego Reyes | (Turkey) Fenerbahçe | Loan return | | |
| 30 June 2019 | (Uruguay) Michael Santos | Málaga | Loan return | | |
| 30 June 2019 | (Spain) Mikel Vesga | Athletic Bilbao | Loan return | | |
| 1 July 2019 | (Morocco) Nabil El Zhar | (Qatar) Al Ahli | Transfer | Free | |
| 1 July 2019 | (Argentina) Ezequiel Muñoz | (Argentina) Lanús | Transfer | Undisclosed | |
| 1 July 2019 | (Spain) Fede Vico | Granada | Buyout clause | €250K | |
| 16 July 2019 | (Spain) Dani Ojeda | Albacete | Loan | | |
| 19 July 2019 | (Ivory Coast) Mamadou Koné | Deportivo La Coruña | Loan | | |
| 19 July 2019 | (Spain) Andrés Prieto | Espanyol | Transfer | Free | |
| 13 August 2019 | (Spain) Gerard Gumbau | Girona | Transfer | €500,000 | |
| 16 August 2019 | (Venezuela) Josua Mejías | Atlético Madrid B | Loan | | |
| 22 August 2019 | (Ghana) Owusu Kwabena | Córdoba | Loan | | |
| 29 August 2019 | (Argentina) Facundo García | (Cyprus) AEK Larnaca | Loan | | |
| 31 August 2019 | (Spain) Álex Martín | Cartagena | Loan | | |
| 2 September 2019 | (Spain) Juan Muñoz | Almería | Loan | €270K | |
| 2 January 2020 | (Argentina) Federico Varela | Las Palmas | Loan | | |
| 16 January 2020 | (Morocco) Youssef En-Nesyri | Sevilla | Transfer | €20,000,000 | |
| 16 January 2020 | (Ukraine) Vasyl Kravets | Lugo | Loan | | |
| 16 January 2020 | (Spain) Sabin Merino | Deportivo La Coruña | Transfer | Free | |
| 23 January 2020 | (Ghana) Owusu Kwabena | (Azerbaijan) Qarabağ | Loan | | |
| 30 January 2020 | (Spain) José Arnaiz | Osasuna | Loan | | |
| 20 February 2020 | (Denmark) Martin Braithwaite | Barcelona | Transfer | €18,000,000 | |

== Pre-season and friendlies ==
Win Draw Loss

| 13 July 2019 Friendly | Leganés | 2–2 | Rayo Vallecano | Leganés, Spain |
| 09:00 CEST (UTC+2) | Merino 72'; Gumbau 90+1' | | Bebé 24'; Pozo 70' | Stadium: Instalación Deportiva Butarque |

| 20 July 2019 Friendly | Leganés | 2–0 | Fuenlabrada | Leganés, Spain |
| 09:00 CEST (UTC+2) | Merino 33'; Ruibal 43' | | | Stadium: Instalación Deportiva Butarque |

| 24 July 2019 Friendly | Raja Casablanca | 0–0 | Leganés | Tangier, Morocco |
| 20:30 CET (UTC+1) | | | | Stadium: Stade Ibn Batouta |

| 31 July 2019 Friendly | Leganés | 3–0 | Alcorcón | Leganés, Spain |
| 09:30 CEST (UTC+2) | Merino 18'; Óscar 40'; Rosales 50' | | | Stadium: Instalación Deportiva Butarque |

| 3 August 2019 Friendly | Amiens | 0–1 | Leganés | Amiens, France |
| 21:00 CEST (UTC+2) | | | Rosales 82' | Stadium: Stade de la Licorne |

| 10 August 2019 Friendly | Leganés | 3–1 | Albacete | Leganés, Spain |
| 20:00 CEST (UTC+2) | Braithwaite 55'; Merino 70'; Arnaiz 76' | | Manaj 90+1' | Stadium: Estadio Municipal de Butarque |

| 4 September 2019 Puchero Trophy | Alcorcón | 0–0 (4–2 p) | Leganés | Alcorcón, Spain |
| 20:00 CEST (UTC+2) | | Report | | Stadium: Santo Domingo |
| | Penalties |
| | Dorca (penalty scored); Stoichkov (penalty scored); Ernesto (penalty scored); Romera (penalty scored) | | (penalty scored) Arnaiz; (penalty scored) Eraso; (penalty missed) Silva; (penalty missed) Navarro |

== Competitions ==
=== Overview ===
| Competition | First match | Last match | Starting round | Final position | Record | | | | | | | |
| Competition | First match | Last match | Starting round | Final position | Pld | W | D | L | GF | GA | GD | Win % |
|---|---|---|---|---|---|---|---|---|---|---|---|---|
| La Liga | 17 August 2019 | 19 July 2020 | Matchday 1 | 18th | 38 | 8 | 12 | 18 | 30 | 51 | −21 | 21.05 |
| Copa del Rey | 17 December 2019 | 30 January 2020 | First round | Round of 16 | 4 | 2 | 1 | 1 | 6 | 6 | +0 | 50.00 |
| Total | | | | | 42 | 10 | 13 | 19 | 36 | 57 | −21 | 23.81 |

Last updated: 19 July 2020
Source: Soccerway

=== La Liga ===
==== League table ====
| Pos | Team | Pld | W | D | L | GF | GA | GD | Pts | Qualification or relegation |
|---|---|---|---|---|---|---|---|---|---|---|
| 16 | Alavés | 38 | 10 | 9 | 19 | 34 | 59 | −25 | 39 | |
| 17 | Celta Vigo | 38 | 7 | 16 | 15 | 37 | 49 | −12 | 37 | |
| 18 | Leganés (R) | 38 | 8 | 12 | 18 | 30 | 51 | −21 | 36 | Relegation to Segunda División |
| 19 | Mallorca (R) | 38 | 9 | 6 | 23 | 40 | 65 | −25 | 33 | Relegation to Segunda División |
| 20 | Espanyol (R) | 38 | 5 | 10 | 23 | 27 | 58 | −31 | 25 | Relegation to Segunda División |

Source: La Liga, Soccerway
Rules for classification: 1) Points; 2) Head-to-head points; 3) Head-to-head goal difference; 4) Goal difference; 5) Goals scored; 6) Fair-play points (Note: Head-to-head record is used only after all the matches between the teams in question have been played)
(R) Relegated

==== Results summary ====
| Overall | | | | | | | | Home | | | | | | Away | | | | | |
| Pld | W | D | L | GF | GA | GD | Pts | W | D | L | GF | GA | GD | W | D | L | GF | GA | GD |
|---|---|---|---|---|---|---|---|---|---|---|---|---|---|---|---|---|---|---|---|
| 38 | 8 | 12 | 18 | 30 | 51 | −21 | 36 | 5 | 5 | 9 | 17 | 26 | −9 | 3 | 7 | 9 | 13 | 25 | −12 |

Last updated: 19 July 2020.
Source: La Liga

==== Results by round ====
| Round | 1 | 2 | 3 | 4 | 5 | 6 | 7 | 8 | 9 | 10 | 11 | 12 | 13 | 14 | 15 | 16 | 17 | 18 | 19 | 20 | 21 | 22 | 23 | 24 | 25 | 26 | 27 | 28 | 29 | 30 | 31 | 32 | 33 | 34 | 35 | 36 | 37 | 38 |
|---|---|---|---|---|---|---|---|---|---|---|---|---|---|---|---|---|---|---|---|---|---|---|---|---|---|---|---|---|---|---|---|---|---|---|---|---|---|---|
| Ground | H | H | A | H | A | H | A | H | A | H | A | H | A | H | A | H | A | H | A | H | A | H | A | H | A | H | A | H | A | A | H | A | H | A | A | H | A | H |
| Result | L | L | L | L | D | D | L | L | L | W | L | L | D | L | L | W | D | W | D | L | D | W | L | D | L | D | W | L | L | D | D | L | L | W | D | W | W | D |
| Position | 15 | 19 | 20 | 20 | 20 | 20 | 20 | 20 | 20 | 20 | 20 | 20 | 20 | 20 | 20 | 19 | 19 | 19 | 19 | 19 | 19 | 18 | 19 | 19 | 19 | 19 | 19 | 19 | 20 | 19 | 19 | 19 | 19 | 19 | 19 | 18 | 18 | 18 |

Updated to match(es) played on 19 July 2020. Source: La Liga
A = Away; H = Home; W = Win; D = Draw; L = Loss

==== Matches ====
The La Liga schedule was announced on 4 July 2019.

| 17 August 2019 1 | Leganés | 0–1 | Osasuna | Leganés |
| 21:00 CEST (UTC+2) | Recio (yellow card) 73'; Óscar (red card) 90+3' | Report | Torres (yellow card) 17'; Ávila (yellow card) 35', (goal) 75'; Rober (yellow card) 45+1'; Moncayola (yellow card) 65' | Stadium: Estadio Municipal de Butarque; Attendance: 10,058; Referee: Javier Alberola Rojas |

| 25 August 2019 2 | Leganés | 0–1 | Atlético Madrid | Leganés |
| 19:00 CEST (UTC+2) | Eraso (yellow card) 23'; Rosales (yellow card) 34'; Silva (yellow card) 73'; En-Nesyri (yellow card) 90' | Report | Hermoso (yellow card) 52'; Thomas (yellow card) 62'; Vitolo 71', (yellow card) 86'; Llorente (yellow card) 73'; Koke (yellow card) 90+1' | Stadium: Estadio Municipal de Butarque; Attendance: 11,742; Referee: Ricardo de Burgos Bengoetxea |

| 31 August 2019 3 | Real Betis | 2–1 | Leganés | Seville |
| 21:00 CEST (UTC+2) | Mandi (yellow card) 49'; Loren 54'; Fekir 61', (yellow card) 90+4'; Canales (yellow card) 83'; Carvalho (yellow card) 90+7' | Report | Mesa (yellow card) 19'; Braithwaite 50'; Silva (yellow card) 68' | Stadium: Benito Villamarín; Attendance: 45,894; Referee: Guillermo Cuadra Fernández |

| 14 September 2019 4 | Leganés | 0–3 | Villarreal | Leganés |
| 16:00 CEST (UTC+2) | Pérez (yellow card) 81'; Mesa (yellow card) 84' | Report | Gerard 26', 90+3'; Silva 39' (o.g.) | Stadium: Estadio Municipal de Butarque; Attendance: 7,670; Referee: David Medié Jiménez |

| 22 September 2019 5 | Valencia | 1–1 | Leganés | Valencia |
| 16:00 CEST (UTC+2) | Parejo 21' (pen.); Kondogbia (yellow card) 59'; Torres (yellow card) 85'; Gabriel (yellow card) 90+1' | Report | Recio (yellow card) 23'; Óscar 35'; Siovas (yellow card) 41'; Soriano (yellow card) 86'; Pérez (yellow card) 88' | Stadium: Mestalla; Attendance: 39,014; Referee: Xavier Estrada Fernández |

| 25 September 2019 6 | Leganés | 1–1 | Athletic Bilbao | Leganés |
| 19:00 CEST (UTC+2) | Óscar 62' | Report | R. García 59' (pen.); D. García (yellow card) 75' | Stadium: Estadio Municipal de Butarque; Attendance: 11,036; Referee: José Luis González González |

| 28 September 2019 7 | Granada | 1–0 | Leganés | Granada |
| 18:30 CEST (UTC+2) | Puertas 28', (yellow card) 45+6'; Machís (yellow card) 66'; Soldado (yellow card) 72' | Report | Navarro (yellow card) 27'; Mesa (yellow card) 65'; Omeruo (yellow card) 80'; Awaziem (yellow card) 87' | Stadium: Nuevo Estadio de Los Cármenes; Attendance: 15,519; Referee: Adrián Cordero Vega |

| 5 October 2019 8 | Leganés | 1–2 | Levante | Leganés |
| 13:00 CEST (UTC+2) | Recio (yellow card) 36'; Óscar (yellow card) 45+1'; Silva (yellow card) 56'; Braithwaite 76' | Report | Vukčević (yellow card) 1'; Miramón (yellow card) 34'; León (yellow card) 45+1'; Roger 45+2' (pen.), (yellow card) 54'; Campaña 49'; Vezo (yellow card) 79' | Stadium: Estadio Municipal de Butarque; Attendance: 10,160; Referee: José Luis Munuera Montero |

| 19 October 2019 9 | Getafe | 2–0 | Leganés | Getafe |
| 18:30 CEST (UTC+2) | Ángel 64', 84'; Nyom (yellow card) 90+1' | Report | Rosales (yellow card) 23'; Mesa (yellow card) 56'; Omeruo (yellow card) 77'; Siovas (yellow card) 90+2' | Stadium: Coliseum Alfonso Pérez; Attendance: 13,018; Referee: Juan Martínez Munuera |

| 26 October 2019 10 | Leganés | 1–0 | Mallorca | Leganés |
| 16:00 CEST (UTC+2) | Braithwaite 31'; Siovas (yellow card) 56'; Rosales (yellow card) 71'; Rivera (yellow card) 77'; Cuéllar (yellow card) 90+4' | Report | Budimir (yellow card) 47' | Stadium: Estadio Municipal de Butarque; Attendance: 10,058; Referee: Eduardo Prieto Iglesias |

| 30 October 2019 11 | Real Madrid | 5–0 | Leganés | Madrid |
| 21:15 CET (UTC+1) | Rodrygo 7'; Kroos 8'; Ramos 24' (pen.); Marcelo (yellow card) 63'; Benzema 69' (pen.); Jović 90+1' | Report | Soriano (yellow card) 24'; Bustinza (yellow card) 41'; Silva (yellow card) 52'; Rivera (yellow card) 62'; Ruibal (yellow card) 84' | Stadium: Santiago Bernabéu; Attendance: 53,870; Referee: César Soto Grado |

| 3 November 2019 12 | Leganés | 1–2 | Eibar | Leganés |
| 18:30 CET (UTC+1) | En-Nesyri 6'; Silva (yellow card) 14'; Braithwaite (yellow card) 65'; Recio (yellow card) 72'; Arnaiz (yellow card) 90+1'; Rivera (yellow card) 90+1' | Report | Kike (yellow card) 5', (goal) 84'; Charles (yellow card) 14', (goal) 17' | Stadium: Estadio Municipal de Butarque; Attendance: 9,648; Referee: Pablo González Fuertes |

| 8 November 2019 13 | Real Sociedad | 1–1 | Leganés | San Sebastián |
| 21:00 CET (UTC+1) | Monreal (yellow card) 19'; Merino 63', (yellow card) 90+6' | Report | Recio (yellow card) 2'; Bustinza (yellow card) 38'; Rodrigues (yellow card) 57' (yellow-red card) 90+7'; En-Nesyri 78'; Omeruo (yellow card) 86'; Rosales (yellow card) 90+4' | Stadium: Anoeta; Attendance: 27,684; Referee: Juan Martínez Munuera |

| 23 November 2019 14 | Leganés | 1–2 | Barcelona | Leganés |
| 13:00 CET (UTC+1) | En-Nesyri 12'; Mesa (yellow card) 20' | Report | Busquets (yellow card) 39'; Suárez 53'; Vidal 79', (yellow card) 90' | Stadium: Estadio Municipal de Butarque; Attendance: 9,465; Referee: Santiago Jaime Latre |

| 1 December 2019 15 | Sevilla | 1–0 | Leganés | Seville |
| 12:00 CET (UTC+1) | Óliver (yellow card) 56'; Diego Carlos 63'; Gil (yellow card) 90+4'; Vázquez (yellow card) 90+5' | Report | Awaziem (yellow card) 49'; Óscar (yellow card) 68'; Rosales (yellow card) 90+4' | Stadium: Ramón Sánchez Pizjuán; Attendance: 33,648; Referee: Ricardo de Burgos Bengoetxea |

| 8 December 2019 16 | Leganés | 3–2 | Celta Vigo | Leganés |
| 18:30 CET (UTC+1) | Recio (yellow card) 5'; Óscar 15', 39'; Pérez (yellow card) 42'; Tarín (yellow card) 49'; Rodrigues 55' | Report | Yokuşlu (yellow card) 30'; Fernández (yellow card) 49' (yellow-red card) 71'; Araujo 64'; Aspas 81', (yellow card) 90+4' | Stadium: Estadio Municipal de Butarque; Attendance: 7,115; Referee: José María Sánchez Martínez |

| 13 December 2019 17 | Alavés | 1–1 | Leganés | Vitoria-Gasteiz |
| 21:00 CET (UTC+1) | Ely (yellow card) 2'; Joselu (yellow card) 42', (goal) 81' | Report | En-Nesyri (yellow card) 8'; Braithwaite 43'; Omeruo (yellow card) 61'; Silva (yellow card) 72' | Stadium: Mendizorrotza; Attendance: 11,247; Referee: César Soto Grado |

| 22 December 2019 18 | Leganés | 2–0 | Espanyol | Leganés |
| 12:00 CET (UTC+1) | Braithwaite 11'; En-Nesyri 54'; Awaziem (yellow card) 68' | Report | Calero (yellow card) 25'; Granero (yellow card) 45+1'; Roca (yellow card) 74'; Vilà (yellow card) 76'; Ferreyra (yellow card) 90+3'; López (yellow card) 90+4' | Stadium: Estadio Municipal de Butarque; Attendance: 10,183; Referee: Javier Alberola Rojas |

| 3 January 2020 19 | Valladolid | 2–2 | Leganés | Valladolid |
| 19:00 CET (UTC+1) | Ünal 8', 79', (yellow card) 90'; Alcaraz (yellow card) 68'; Guardiola (yellow card) 86' | Report | Braithwaite 4'; Silva (yellow card) 7'; Mesa 13', (yellow card) 58' | Stadium: José Zorrilla; Attendance: 21,492; Referee: Juan Martínez Munuera |

| 17 January 2020 20 | Leganés | 0–3 | Getafe | Leganés |
| 21:00 CET (UTC+1) | Mesa (yellow card) 53'; Braithwaite (yellow card) 56'; Arnaiz (yellow card) 66'; Recio (yellow card) 76'; Pérez (yellow card) 90+1'; Silva (yellow card) 90+1' | Report | Cabrera 12'; Nyom (yellow card) 15', (goal) 21'; Mata 33', (yellow card) 72'; Maksimović (yellow card) 64'; Suárez (yellow card) 90+7' | Stadium: Estadio Municipal de Butarque; Attendance: 11,450; Referee: Xavier Estrada Fernández |

| 26 January 2020 21 | Atlético Madrid | 0–0 | Leganés | Madrid |
| 12:00 CET (UTC+1) | Savić (yellow card) 90+6' | Report | Awaziem (yellow card) 11'; Eraso (yellow card) 54'; Cuéllar (yellow card) 77' (yellow-red card) 90+4'; Mesa (yellow card) 90'; Recio (yellow card) 90+2' | Stadium: Wanda Metropolitano; Attendance: 52,767; Referee: Antonio Mateu Lahoz |

| 2 February 2020 22 | Leganés | 2–1 | Real Sociedad | Leganés |
| 12:00 CET (UTC+1) | Recio (yellow card) 18'; Omeruo 49'; Awaziem (yellow card) 69'; Carrillo (yellow card) 78'; Silva (yellow card) 80'; Óscar 90+4' | Report | Isak 20'; Zubeldia (yellow card) 39'; Willian José (yellow card) 89'; Guevara (yellow card) 90+3' | Stadium: Estadio Municipal de Butarque; Attendance: 10,913; Referee: Mario Melero López |

| 8 February 2020 23 | Levante | 2–0 | Leganés | Valencia |
| 13:00 CET (UTC+1) | Rochina 20'; Roger 28'; Vukčević (yellow card) 33'; Mayoral (yellow card) 55' | Report | Omeruo (yellow card) 23'; Bustinza (yellow card) 42'; Rodrigues (yellow card) 49' | Stadium: Estadi Ciutat de València; Attendance: 17,110; Referee: José Luis González González |

| 16 February 2020 24 | Leganés | 0–0 | Real Betis | Leganés |
| 14:00 CET (UTC+1) | Braithwaite (yellow card) 66'; Pérez (yellow card) 74'; Ruibal (yellow card) 87'; Gil (yellow card) 87'; Óscar (yellow card) 90+4' | Report | Emerson (yellow card) 26'; Rodríguez (yellow card) 36'; Carvalho (yellow card) 76'; Iglesias (red card) 90+3' | Stadium: Estadio Municipal de Butarque; Attendance: 11,160; Referee: Xavier Estrada Fernández |

| 22 February 2020 25 | Celta Vigo | 1–0 | Leganés | Vigo |
| 13:00 CET (UTC+1) | Bradarić (red card) 21'; Suárez (yellow card) 26'; Murillo (yellow card) 31'; Aspas 62' | Report | Silva (yellow card) 14'; Siovas (yellow card) 24'; Óscar (yellow card) 62' | Stadium: Abanca-Balaídos; Attendance: 19,335; Referee: José Luis Munuera Montero |

| 29 February 2020 26 | Leganés | 1–1 | Alavés | Leganés |
| 18:30 CET (UTC+1) | Carrillo 59'; Gil (yellow card) 68'; Awaziem (yellow card) 71'; R. Pérez (yellow card) 90+2' | Report | Duarte (yellow card) 41'; L. Pérez 47'; Fejsa (yellow card) 67'; Vidal (yellow card) 83' | Stadium: Estadio Municipal de Butarque; Attendance: 10,043; Referee: Juan Martínez Munuera |

| 8 March 2020 27 | Villarreal | 1–2 | Leganés | Villarreal |
| 18:30 CET (UTC+1) | Gerard 5'; Moreno (yellow card) 42'; Peña (yellow card) 79'; Alcácer (yellow card) 79'; Iborra (yellow card) 90+2' | Report | Óscar 47', 70' (pen.); Rodrigues (yellow card) 80'; Awaziem (yellow card) 90+3'; Silva (yellow card) 90+6' | Stadium: Estadio de la Cerámica; Attendance: 16,143; Referee: César Soto Grado |

| 13 June 2020 28 | Leganés | 1–2 | Valladolid | Leganés |
| 19:30 CEST (UTC+2) | Óscar 83' (pen.) | Report | Ünal 2'; Guardiola (yellow card) 29'; Plano (yellow card) 40'; Alcaraz 54'; Salisu (yellow card) 83'; Fede (yellow card) 89' | Stadium: Estadio Municipal de Butarque; Attendance: 0 Referee: Mario Melero López |
Note: The match was originally scheduled for 14 March, but was postponed due to the COVID-19 pandemic. and rescheduled to 13 June. It was played behind closed doors.

| 16 June 2020 29 | Barcelona | 2–0 | Leganés | Barcelona |
| 22:00 CEST (UTC+2) | Fati 42'; Messi 69' (pen.); Umtiti (yellow card) 83'; Puig (yellow card) 84'; Lenglet (yellow card) 84'; Junior (yellow card) 89'; Rakitić (yellow card) 90+3' | Report | Bustinza (yellow card) 37'; Pérez (yellow card) 68'; Awaziem (yellow card) 82' | Stadium: Camp Nou; Attendance: 0 Referee: Juan Martínez Munuera |
Note: The match was originally scheduled for 22 March, but was postponed due to the 2020 coronavirus pandemic, and rescheduled to 16 June. It was played behind closed doors.

| 19 June 2020 30 | Mallorca | 1–1 | Leganés | Palma |
| 19:30 CEST (UTC+2) | Sevilla 9'; Rodríguez (yellow card) 49'; Budimir (yellow card) 59'; Junior (yellow card) 79' | Report | Carrillo (yellow card) 2'; Amadou (yellow card) 35'; Rodrigues (yellow card) 48'; Mesa (yellow card) 67'; Óscar (yellow card) 76', (goal) 87'; Rosales (yellow card) 90+3' | Stadium: Estadi de Son Moix; Attendance: 0 Referee: Antonio Mateu Lahoz |
Note: The match was originally scheduled for 5 April, but was postponed due to the 2020 coronavirus pandemic, and rescheduled to 19 June. It was played behind closed doors.

| 22 June 2020 31 | Leganés | 0–0 | Granada | Leganés |
| 22:00 CEST (UTC+2) | Bustinza (yellow card) 13'; Silva (yellow card) 36'; Rodrigues (yellow card) 50'; Pérez (yellow card) 81' | Report | Antoñín (yellow card) 23'; Machís (yellow card) 45'; Neva (yellow card) 63'; Herrera (yellow card) 74' | Stadium: Estadio Municipal de Butarque; Attendance: 0 Referee: Ricardo de Burgos Bengoetxea |
Note: The match was originally scheduled for 12 April, but was postponed due to the 2020 coronavirus pandemic, and rescheduled to 22 June. It was played behind closed doors.

| 27 June 2020 32 | Osasuna | 2–1 | Leganés | Pamplona |
| 19:30 CEST (UTC+2) | Gallego 9', 90+6'; Brašanac (yellow card) 34' | Report | Awaziem (yellow card) 45'; Avilés 50' | Stadium: El Sadar Stadium; Attendance: 0 Referee: Javier Alberola Rojas |
Note: The match was originally scheduled for 22 April, but was postponed due to the 2020 coronavirus pandemic, and rescheduled to 27 June. It was played behind closed doors.

| 30 June 2020 33 | Leganés | 0–3 | Sevilla | Leganés |
| 21:00 CEST (UTC+2) | Amadou (yellow card) 17'; Mesa (yellow card) 52'; Rosales (yellow card) 75'; Manu (yellow card) 86' | Report | Óliver 23', 35'; Koundé (yellow card) 54'; Gudelj (yellow card) 56'; Jordán (yellow card) 68'; Munir 82' | Stadium: Estadio Municipal de Butarque; Attendance: 0 Referee: César Soto Grado |
Note: The match was originally scheduled for 26 April, but was postponed due to the 2020 coronavirus pandemic. and rescheduled to 30 June. It was played behind closed doors.

| 5 July 2020 34 | Espanyol | 0–1 | Leganés | Cornellà de Llobregat |
| 17:00 CEST (UTC+2) | De Tomás (yellow card) 51'; Darder (yellow card) 86'; Calleri (yellow card) 88' (yellow-red card) 88' | Report | Silva 53'; Assalé (yellow card) 67'; Siovas (yellow card) 84'; Avilés (yellow card) 90+1' | Stadium: RCDE Stadium; Attendance: 0 Referee: Guillermo Cuadra Fernández |
Note: The match was originally scheduled for 3 May, but was postponed due to the 2020 coronavirus pandemic, and rescheduled to 5 July. It was played behind closed doors.

| 9 July 2020 35 | Eibar | 0–0 | Leganés | Eibar |
| 19:30 CEST (UTC+2) | P. Diop (yellow card) 46'; Rober (yellow card) 55'; Charles (yellow card) 73' | Report | Bustinza (yellow card) 17'; Siovas (yellow card) 53'; Cuéllar (yellow card) 89' | Stadium: Ipurua Municipal Stadium; Attendance: 0 Referee: Eduardo Prieto Iglesias |
Note: The match was originally scheduled for 10 May, but was postponed due to the 2020 coronavirus pandemic, and rescheduled to 9 July. It was played behind closed doors.

| 12 July 2020 36 | Leganés | 1–0 | Valencia | Leganés |
| 19:30 CEST (UTC+2) | Pérez 18' (pen.); Silva (red card) 54'; Mesa (yellow card) 70'; Ruibal (yellow card) 80'; Awaziem (yellow card) 90+2'; Recio (yellow card) 90+4' | Report | Wass (yellow card) 9' | Stadium: Estadio Municipal de Butarque; Attendance: 0 Referee: Mario Melero López |
Note: The match was originally scheduled for 13 May, but was postponed due to the 2020 coronavirus pandemic, and rescheduled to 12 July. It was played behind closed doors.

| 16 July 2020 37 | Athletic Bilbao | 0–2 | Leganés | Bilbao |
| 21:00 CEST (UTC+2) | Simón (red card) 22'; R. García (yellow card) 53'; Muniain (yellow card) 63' | Report | Eraso (yellow card) 43'; Bustinza (yellow card) 43'; Pérez (yellow card) 76'; Guerrero 79'; Assalé 90+4' | Stadium: San Mamés Stadium; Attendance: 0 Referee: Juan Martínez Munuera |
Note: The match was originally scheduled for 17 May, but was postponed due to the 2020 coronavirus pandemic, and rescheduled to 16 July. It was played behind closed doors.

| 19 July 2020 38 | Leganés | 2–2 | Real Madrid | Leganés |
| 21:00 CEST (UTC+2) | Recio (yellow card) 39'; Ruibal (yellow card) 43'; Gil 45+1'; Bustinza (yellow card) 49'; Silva (yellow card) 56'; Assalé 78' | Report | Ramos 9'; Asensio 52'; Brahim (yellow card) 66' | Stadium: Estadio Municipal de Butarque; Attendance: 0 Referee: Guillermo Cuadra Fernández |
Note: The match was originally scheduled for 24 May, but was postponed due to the 2020 coronavirus pandemic, and rescheduled to 19 July. It was played behind closed doors.

=== Copa del Rey ===
| 17 December 2019 First round | Andorra | 1–1 (a.e.t.) (5–6 p) | Leganés | Encamp |
| 21:00 CET (UTC+1) | Keita 25'; Sidibé (yellow card) 30' | Report | Awaziem (yellow card) 46'; Carrillo 63'; Rivera (yellow card) 99' | Stadium: Prada de Moles; Attendance: 600; Referee: Santiago Jaime Latre |
| | Penalties |
| | Palanca (penalty scored); Goujón (penalty missed); Loureiro (penalty scored); Casadesús (penalty scored); Sidibé (penalty missed); Marchán (penalty scored); Keita (penalty scored); Sot (penalty missed) | | (penalty missed) Carrillo; (penalty scored) Varela; (penalty missed) Ruibal; (penalty scored) Mourid; (penalty scored) Plomer; (penalty scored) Avilés; (penalty scored) Tarín; (penalty scored) Awaziem |

| 11 January 2020 Second round | Murcia | 0–4 | Leganés | Murcia |
| 16:00 CET (UTC+1) | Rodríguez (yellow card) 79' | Report | Carrillo 36', 76'; Rivera (yellow card) 58'; Braithwaite 62', 69'; Silva (yellow card) 79' | Stadium: Estadio Nueva Condomina; Attendance: 10,777; Referee: David Medié Jiménez |

| 23 January 2020 Round of 32 | Ebro | 0–1 | Leganés | Zaragoza |
| 19:00 CET (UTC+1) | Palomares (yellow card) 77' | Report | Mourid (yellow card) 18'; Silva 44'; Eraso (yellow card) 79' | Stadium: Pedro Sancho; Attendance: 1,800; Referee: José Luis González González |

| 30 January 2020 Round of 16 | Barcelona | 5–0 | Leganés | Barcelona |
| 19:00 CET (UTC+1) | Griezmann 4'; Lenglet 27'; Messi 59', 89'; Arthur 77' | Report | Pérez (yellow card) 25'; Awaziem (yellow card) 73'; Tarín (yellow card) 83' | Stadium: Camp Nou; Attendance: 43,216; Referee: Guillermo Cuadra Fernández |

== Statistics ==
=== Squad statistics ===
Last updated on the end of the season.

| No. | Pos | Nat | Player | Total | | La Liga | | Copa del Rey | |
| No. | Pos | Nat | Player | Apps | Goals | Apps | Goals | Apps | Goals |
Goalkeepers
| 1 | GK | (Spain) ESP | Iván Cuéllar | 28 | 0 | 27 | 0 | 1 | 0 |
| 13 | GK | (Spain) ESP | Juan Soriano | 14 | 0 | 11 | 0 | 3 | 0 |
| 30 | GK | (Brazil) BRA | André Grandi | 0 | 0 | 0 | 0 | 0 | 0 |
Defenders
| 2 | DF | (Spain) ESP | Marc Navarro | 6 | 0 | 3+1 | 0 | 0+2 | 0 |
| 3 | DF | (Spain) ESP | Unai Bustinza | 35 | 0 | 31+2 | 0 | 2 | 0 |
| 4 | DF | (Nigeria) NGR | Kenneth Omeruo | 23 | 1 | 22+1 | 1 | 0 | 0 |
| 5 | DF | (Argentina) ARG | Jonathan Silva | 36 | 2 | 32+1 | 1 | 3 | 1 |
| 12 | DF | (Nigeria) NGR | Chidozie Awaziem | 29 | 0 | 21+5 | 0 | 3 | 0 |
| 15 | DF | (Spain) ESP | Rodrigo Tarín | 18 | 0 | 12+2 | 0 | 4 | 0 |
| 16 | DF | (Venezuela) VEN | Roberto Rosales | 28 | 0 | 21+4 | 0 | 3 | 0 |
| 22 | DF | (Greece) GRE | Dimitris Siovas | 25 | 0 | 23+1 | 0 | 1 | 0 |
| 24 | DF | (Portugal) POR | Kévin Rodrigues | 27 | 1 | 22+4 | 1 | 0+1 | 0 |
| 29 | DF | (Morocco) MAR | Aymane Mourid | 2 | 0 | 0 | 0 | 1+1 | 0 |
Midfielders
| 6 | MF | (Spain) ESP | Roque Mesa | 30 | 1 | 22+7 | 1 | 1 | 0 |
| 8 | MF | (Spain) ESP | Recio | 26 | 0 | 18+7 | 0 | 0+1 | 0 |
| 11 | MF | (Argentina) ARG | Alexander Szymanowski | 0 | 0 | 0 | 0 | 0 | 0 |
| 17 | MF | (Spain) ESP | Javier Eraso | 24 | 0 | 11+9 | 0 | 3+1 | 0 |
| 21 | MF | (Spain) ESP | Rubén Pérez | 28 | 1 | 25+1 | 1 | 2 | 0 |
| 23 | MF | (France) FRA | Ibrahim Amadou | 10 | 0 | 9+1 | 0 | 0 | 0 |
| 27 | MF | (Spain) ESP | Óscar | 30 | 9 | 22+8 | 9 | 0 | 0 |
Forwards
| 9 | FW | (Spain) ESP | Miguel Ángel Guerrero | 13 | 1 | 9+4 | 1 | 0 | 0 |
| 18 | FW | (Argentina) ARG | Guido Carrillo | 27 | 4 | 13+11 | 1 | 3 | 3 |
| 19 | FW | (Spain) ESP | Aitor Ruibal | 29 | 0 | 13+12 | 0 | 4 | 0 |
| 20 | FW | (Ivory Coast) CIV | Roger Assalé | 14 | 2 | 2+12 | 2 | 0 | 0 |
| 26 | FW | (Spain) ESP | Bryan Gil | 12 | 1 | 4+8 | 1 | 0 | 0 |
| 31 | FW | (Spain) ESP | Daniel Plomer | 2 | 0 | 0 | 0 | 0+2 | 0 |
| 33 | FW | (Spain) ESP | Javier Avilés | 10 | 1 | 1+8 | 1 | 0+1 | 0 |
| 39 | FW | (Spain) ESP | Manu Garrido | 4 | 0 | 2+2 | 0 | 0 | 0 |
Players who have made an appearance or had a squad number this season but have left the club
| 7 | FW | (Denmark) DEN | Martin Braithwaite | 27 | 8 | 21+3 | 6 | 2+1 | 2 |
| 9 | FW | (Spain) ESP | Sabin Merino | 3 | 0 | 1+1 | 0 | 1 | 0 |
| 10 | FW | (Spain) ESP | José Arnaiz | 14 | 0 | 2+10 | 0 | 2 | 0 |
| 14 | MF | (Spain) ESP | Christian Rivera | 7 | 0 | 3+2 | 0 | 2 | 0 |
| 20 | MF | (Argentina) ARG | Fede Varela | 1 | 0 | 0 | 0 | 0+1 | 0 |
| 23 | DF | (Ukraine) UKR | Vasyl Kravets | 1 | 0 | 0 | 0 | 1 | 0 |
| 26 | FW | (Morocco) MAR | Youssef En-Nesyri | 19 | 4 | 15+3 | 4 | 1 | 0 |

=== Goals ===
As of 12 July 2020

| Rank | Player | Position | La Liga | Copa del Rey | Total |
|---|---|---|---|---|---|
| 1 | (Spain) Óscar | MF | 9 | 0 | 9 |
| 2 | (Denmark) Martin Braithwaite | FW | 6 | 2 | 8 |
| 3 | (Morocco) Youssef En-Nesyri | FW | 4 | 0 | 4 |
| 3 | (Argentina) Guido Carrillo | FW | 1 | 3 | 4 |
| 5 | (Argentina) Jonathan Silva | DF | 1 | 1 | 2 |
| 6 | (Spain) Roque Mesa | MF | 1 | 0 | 1 |
| 6 | (Nigeria) Kenneth Omeruo | DF | 1 | 0 | 1 |
| 6 | (Portugal) Kévin Rodrigues | DF | 1 | 0 | 1 |
| 6 | (Spain) Javier Avilés | FW | 1 | 0 | 1 |
| 6 | (Spain) Rubén Pérez | MF | 1 | 0 | 1 |
| Total | | | 26 | 6 | 32 |

=== Clean sheets ===
As of 3 January 2020

| Rank | Name | La Liga | Copa del Rey | Total |
|---|---|---|---|---|
| 1 | (Spain) Iván Cuéllar | 2 | 0 | 2 |
| 2 | (Spain) Juan Soriano | 0 | 0 | 0 |
| Total | | 2 | 0 | 2 |
