= 2013 Rally Islas Canarias =

Rally Islas Canarias El Corte Inglés 2013
Round 3 of the 2013 European Rally Championship season
← Previous event	Next event →
- Host country: Spain
- Rally base: Las Palmas
- Dates run: 22 – 23 March 2013
- Stages: 14 (239 km; 149 miles)
- Stage surface: Tarmac

Statistics
- Crews: 27 (ERC only) at start, 18 (ERC only) at finish

The Rally Islas Canarias El Corte Inglés was the third round of the 2013 European Rally Championship. The stages were tarmac. Jan Kopecký won the event after a huge fight with runner-up Craig Breen. Luis Monzón rounded off the podium places.

== Results ==
Pos.	Driver	Co-driver	Car	Time	Difference	Points
1	(Czech Republic) Jan Kopecký	(Czech Republic) Pavel Dresler	(Czech Republic) Škoda Fabia S2000	2:24:30.9		25+13
2	(Republic of Ireland) Craig Breen	(Republic of Ireland) David Moynihan	(France) Peugeot 207 S2000	2:26:23.3	+1:52.4	18+10
3	(Spain) Luis Monzón	(Spain) José Carlos Déniz	(United Kingdom) Mini Cooper S2000	2:27:49.8	+3:18.9	15+9
4	(Spain) Fernando Capdevila	(Spain) David Rivero	(United Kingdom) Ford Focus RS WRC	2:28:02.3	+3:31.4	12+6
5	(Spain) Miguel Ángel Fuster	(Spain) Daniel Cue	(Germany) Porsche 997 GT3	2:29:01.8	+4:30.9	10+3
6	(Spain) Xavi Pons	(Spain) Álex Haro	(Germany) Porsche 997 GT3	2:30:46.2	+6:15.3	8+1
7	(Austria) Andreas Aigner	(Austria) Jürgen Heigl	(Japan) Subaru Impreza R4	2:31:21.7	+6:50.8	6+3
8	(Spain) Jonathan Pérez	(Spain) Francisco J. Álvarez	(Japan) Mitsubishi Lancer Evo X	2:31:25.3	+6:54.4	4
9	(Spain) Alberto Meira	(Spain) David Vázquez	(Japan) Mitsubishi Lancer Evo X	2:32:08.2	+7:37.3	2
10	(France) Germain Bonnefis	(France) Olivier Fournier	(France) Renault Mégane RS	2:33:01.9	+8:31.0	1

=== Special stages ===
Day	Stage	Name	Length	Time	Winner	Time	Avg. spd.	Rally leader
Day 1 22 March	SS1	Moya 1	13,57 km	07:48	(Poland) Robert Kubica	8:40.4	93.9 km/h	(Poland) Robert Kubica
Day 1 22 March	SS2	Artenara 1	10,49 km	08:24	(Poland) Robert Kubica	13:49.4	91.9 km/h	(Poland) Robert Kubica
Day 1 22 March	SS3	Tejeda 1	14,31 km	09:09	(Poland) Robert Kubica	8:50.5	97.1 km/h	(Poland) Robert Kubica
Day 1 22 March	SS4	Moya 2	13,57 km	12:17	(Poland) Robert Kubica	8:32.2	95.4 km/h	(Poland) Robert Kubica
Day 1 22 March	SS5	Artenara 2	21,18 km	12:54	(Poland) Robert Kubica	13:29.9	94.1 km/h	(Poland) Robert Kubica
Day 1 22 March	SS6	Tejeda 2	14,31 km	13:39	(Poland) Robert Kubica	8:51.2	97.0 km/h	(Poland) Robert Kubica
Day 1 22 March	SS7	Agüimes	25,82 km	17:27	(Poland) Robert Kubica	14:39.5	105.7 km/h	(Poland) Robert Kubica
Day 1 22 March	SS8	Ingenio	20,88 km	18:30	(Poland) Robert Kubica	12:38.9	99.0 km/h	(Poland) Robert Kubica
Day 2 23 March	SS9	Maspalomas 1	13,28 km	10:28	(Czech Republic) Jan Kopecký	4:24.8	116.9 km/h	(Poland) Robert Kubica
Day 2 23 March	SS10	San Bartolomé de Tirajana 1	21,36 km	11:01	(Czech Republic) Jan Kopecký	12:39.0	101.3 km/h	(Czech Republic) Jan Kopecký
Day 2 23 March	SS11	Valleseco 1	16,12 km	11:44	(Spain) Miguel Ángel Fuster	9:59.3	96.8 km/h	(Czech Republic) Jan Kopecký
Day 2 23 March	SS12	Maspalomas 1	13,28 km	15:07	(Czech Republic) Jan Kopecký	4:25.9	116.4 km/h	(Czech Republic) Jan Kopecký
Day 2 23 March	SS13	San Bartolomé de Tirajana 2	21,36 km	15:40	(Spain) Fernando Capdevila	12:35.3	101.8 km/h	(Czech Republic) Jan Kopecký
Day 2 23 March	SS14	Valleseco 2	16,12 km	16:23	(Czech Republic) Jan Kopecký	9:36.1	100.7 km/h	(Czech Republic) Jan Kopecký
