= Christian Rivera (Spanish footballer) =

Spanish association football player

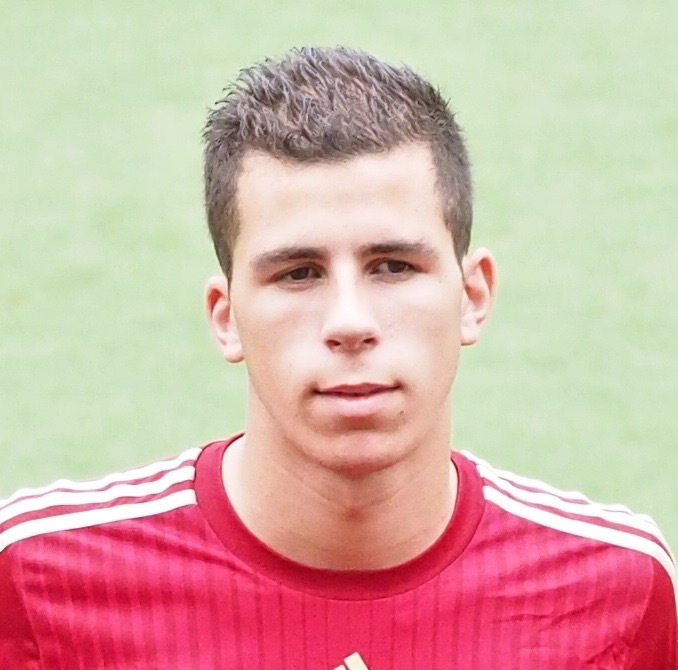
- Rivera with Spain U18 in 2015

Personal information
- Full name: Christian Rivera Hernández
- Date of birth: 9 July 1997 (age 29)
- Place of birth: Gijón, Spain
- Height: 1.91 m (6 ft 3 in)
- Position: Defensive midfielder

Team information
- Current team: Avilés
- Number: 23

Youth career
- Sporting Gijón

Senior career*
Years	Team	Apps	(Gls)
2014–2015	Oviedo B	20	(0)
2015–2016	Oviedo	13	(1)
2016–2018	Eibar	24	(0)
2018	→ Barcelona B (loan)	18	(0)
2018–2021	Las Palmas	9	(0)
2018–2019	→ Huesca (loan)	22	(2)
2019–2020	→ Leganés (loan)	5	(0)
2020	→ Girona (loan)	8	(0)
2021–2024	Sporting Gijón	73	(1)
2025–2026	Torpedo Kutaisi	4	(0)
2026–	Avilés	12	(0)

International career
2015	Spain U18	2	(0)
2014–2016	Spain U19	9	(1)
- * Club domestic league appearances and goals as of 9 June 2026

Christian Rivera Hernández (born 9 July 1997) is a Spanish professional footballer who plays as a defensive midfielder for Primera Federación club Avilés.

== Club career ==
Born in Gijón, Asturias, Rivera was a Sporting de Gijón youth graduate. In July 2013 he nearly joined Atlético Madrid, but his transfer was blocked by Sporting's board and he was left out of the Juvenil squad; on 2 September of the following year he moved to Real Oviedo instead.

Initially appearing with the B-team in Tercera División, Rivera was called up to the main squad in May 2015. He made his first team debut on the 16th, starting in a 2–3 away loss against Coruxo FC in the Segunda División B championship.

Rivera made his professional debut on 4 October 2015, coming on as a half-time substitute for Diego Aguirre in a 1–1 Segunda División home draw against RCD Mallorca. Thirteen days later he scored his first goal in the category, netting his team's last in a 3–2 home win against AD Alcorcón.

On 1 July 2016, Rivera signed a three-year deal with La Liga side SD Eibar. He made his debut in the category on 19 August, starting in a 1–2 away loss against Deportivo de La Coruña.

On 11 January 2018, Rivera was loaned to FC Barcelona B in the second division until the end of the season, with an option to buy. He moved to fellow second division side UD Las Palmas on 31 July, after agreeing to a four-year deal.

On 25 October 2018, Rivera joined SD Huesca in the main category on loan until the end of the season, replacing injured Luisinho. The following 2 September, after suffering relegation, he moved to CD Leganés also in a temporary deal.

On 31 January 2020, Rivera's loan with Lega was terminated, and he instead joined Girona FC on loan until June. Upon returning, he was assigned to Las Palmas' main squad, but under a layoff; the club later revoked the decision.

On 19 July 2021, Rivera returned to his first club Sporting after signing a four-year contract. On 26 June 2024, the club announced his departure at the end of the month.

In March 2025, Rivera joined Georgian Erovnuli Liga club Torpedo Kutaisi on a three-year deal.

On 4 January 2026, Rivera returned to Spain and signed with Avilés in the third division.

== Career statistics ==
As of match played 24 May 2025

Appearances and goals by club, season and competition
Club	Season	League			National cup (Note: Includes Copa del Rey)		Europe		Other		Total	
Club	Season	Division	Apps	Goals	Apps	Goals	Apps	Goals	Apps	Goals	Apps	Goals
Oviedo	2014–15	Segunda División B	1	0	0	0	—		2 (Note: Appearances in 2015 Segunda División B play-offs)	0	3	0
Oviedo	2015–16	Segunda División	12	1	1	0	—		0	0	13	1
Oviedo	Total		13	1	1	0	—		2	0	16	1
Eibar	2016–17	La Liga	17	0	5	0	—		0	0	22	0
Eibar	2017–18	La Liga	7	0	1	0	—		0	0	8	0
Eibar	Total		24	0	6	0	—		0	0	30	0
Las Palmas	2018–19	Segunda División	3	0	1	0	—		0	0	4	0
Las Palmas	2020–21	Segunda División	6	0	1	0	—		0	0	7	0
Las Palmas	Total		9	0	2	0	—		0	0	11	0
Huesca (loan)	2018–19	La Liga	22	2	1	0	—		0	0	23	2
Leganés (loan)	2019–20	La Liga	5	0	2	0	—		0	0	7	0
Girona (loan)	2019–20	Segunda División	8	0	0	0	—		0	0	8	0
Sporting de Gijón	2021–22	Segunda División	21	1	4	0	—		0	0	25	1
Sporting de Gijón	2022–23	Segunda División	24	0	2	1	—		0	0	26	1
Sporting de Gijón	2023–24	Segunda División	28	0	1	0	—		2 (Note: Appearances in 2024 Segunda División play-offs)	0	31	0
Sporting de Gijón	Total		73	1	7	1	—		2	0	82	2
Torpedo Kutaisi	2025	Erovnuli Liga	4	0	0	0	—		0	0	4	0
Career total			158	4	19	1	0	0	4	0	181	5

== Honours ==
Oviedo

- Segunda División B: 2014–15
