= David Santisteban =

Spanish footballer

Personal information
- Full name: David Santisteban García
- Date of birth: 26 June 2001 (age 25)
- Place of birth: La Unión, Spain
- Height: 1.75 m (5 ft 9 in)
- Position: Forward

Team information
- Current team: Fuenlabrada
- Number: 19

Youth career
- Torre Pacheco
- 2018–2019: Kelme
- 2019–2020: Granada

Senior career*
Years	Team	Apps	(Gls)
2020–2021	Cartagena B	23	(12)
2021	Cartagena	6	(0)
2021–2024	Sevilla B	39	(3)
2022–2023	→ San Roque Lepe (loan)	30	(7)
2024	UCAM Murcia	11	(2)
2024–2025	Xerez	30	(7)
2025	Minera	0	(0)
2025–	Fuenlabrada	16	(2)
- * Club domestic league appearances and goals as of 16 May 2026

David Santisteban García (born 26 June 2001) is a Spanish footballer who plays as a forward for Segunda Federación club Fuenlabrada.

== Club career ==
Born in La Unión, Region of Murcia, Santisteban represented EF Torre Pacheco, Kelme CF and Granada CF as a youth. On 20 August 2020, he signed for FC Cartagena and was initially assigned to the reserves in Tercera División.

Santisteban made his senior debut on 18 October 2020, starting and scoring the opener in a 2–0 home win against Racing Murcia FC. He made his first team debut the following 26 February, coming on as a late substitute for Elady Zorrilla in a 1–0 Segunda División home win against CD Leganés.

On 13 July 2021, Santisteban signed a three-year contract with Sevilla FC, being assigned to the reserves in Primera División RFEF.

== Personal life ==
Santisteban's older brother Iván is also a footballer. A defender, he also played for Cartagena's reserve and first teams.
