= Kévin Rodrigues =

Footballer (born 1994)

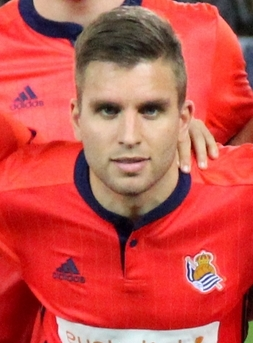
- Rodrigues with Real Sociedad in 2018

Personal information
- Full name: Kévin Manuel Rodrigues
- Date of birth: 5 March 1994 (age 32)
- Place of birth: Bayonne, France
- Height: 1.69 m (5 ft 7 in)
- Position: Left-back

Team information
- Current team: Gençlerbirliği

Youth career
- 2000–2008: Bayonne
- 2008–2012: Toulouse

Senior career*
Years	Team	Apps	(Gls)
2012–2014	Toulouse	2	(0)
2012–2014	Toulouse B	14	(1)
2014–2015	Dijon	2	(0)
2014–2015	Dijon B	21	(3)
2015–2017	Real Sociedad B	56	(6)
2017–2022	Real Sociedad	30	(1)
2019–2020	→ Leganés (loan)	26	(1)
2020–2021	→ Eibar (loan)	22	(1)
2021–2022	→ Rayo Vallecano (loan)	13	(0)
2022–2023	Adana Demirspor	44	(2)
2024	Al Qadsiah	15	(0)
2024–2025	Kasımpaşa	28	(1)
2025–2026	Gaziantep	28	(2)
2026–	Gençlerbirliği	0	(0)

International career
2012	France U18	6	(1)
2012–2013	France U19	6	(1)
2017	Portugal U21	5	(0)
2017–2018	Portugal	3	(0)
- * Club domestic league appearances and goals as of 10 June 2026

Kévin Manuel Rodrigues (born 5 March 1994) is a professional footballer who plays for Süper Lig club Gençlerbirliği. Mainly a left-back, he can also play as a midfielder.

He spent most of his career in Spain with Real Sociedad, after starting out at Toulouse. In La Liga, he also appeared for Leganés, Eibar and Rayo Vallecano, totalling 91 games and three goals.

Born in France, Rodrigues originally represented France internationally before switching to Portugal in 2017.

== Club career ==
=== France ===
Born in Bayonne, Nouvelle-Aquitaine to Portuguese parents, Rodrigues made his senior debut with Toulouse FC on 20 May 2012, coming on as a 69th-minute substitute in a 0–2 Ligue 1 home loss against AC Ajaccio.

In his country of birth, Rodrigues also represented Dijon FCO, appearing rarely for the Ligue 2 club as it finished in fourth place in the 2014–15 season.

=== Real Sociedad ===
Rodrigues signed for Real Sociedad on 4 June 2015, being initially assigned to the reserves in Segunda División B. His first game in La Liga with the first team took place on 29 January 2017, when he started in a 3–0 away defeat to Real Madrid.

On 1 March 2017, Rodrigues renewed his contract until 2020, and was promoted to the main squad ahead of the 2017–18 campaign. He scored his first league goal on 17 September, but also added one in his own net in a 1–3 home loss also against Real Madrid.

On 2 September 2019, after losing space to newcomer Aihen Muñoz, mainly due to injuries, Rodrigues was loaned to fellow top-tier side CD Leganés for one year. On 12 September 2020, he moved to SD Eibar of the same league also in a temporary deal.

Rodrigues moved to Rayo Vallecano also in the Spanish top flight on 11 August 2021, on a one-year loan.

=== Later career ===
On 10 June 2022, Rodrigues signed a three-year contract with Adana Demirspor effective as of 1 July when he became a free agent. He left by mutual consent in December 2023.

On 31 January 2024, Rodrigues joined Saudi First Division League club Al Qadsiah FC on a deal until the end of the season. Subsequently, he competed in the Turkish Süper Lig with Kasımpaşa SK, Gaziantep F.K.. and Gençlerbirliği SK.

== International career ==
Rodrigues was a France youth international, having represented his nation at under-18 level. On 3 November 2016 he was first called up to the Portugal under-21 side, being part of the squad that appeared in the following year's UEFA European Championship.

Rodrigues won his first full cap on 10 November 2017, playing the entire 3–0 friendly win over Saudi Arabia in Viseu.

== Career statistics ==
=== Club ===
As of match played 26 November 2023

Appearances and goals by club, season and competition
Club	Season	League			National Cup		League Cup		Continental		Total	
Club	Season	Division	Apps	Goals	Apps	Goals	Apps	Goals	Apps	Goals	Apps	Goals
Toulouse B	2012–13	Amateur 2	5	0	—		—		—		5	0
Toulouse B	2013–14	Amateur 2	9	1	—		—		—		9	1
Toulouse B	Total		14	1	0	0	0	0	0	0	14	1
Toulouse	2011–12	Ligue 1	1	0	0	0	0	0	—		1	0
Toulouse	2012–13	Ligue 1	1	0	0	0	0	0	—		1	0
Toulouse	2013–14	Ligue 1	0	0	0	0	0	0	—		0	0
Toulouse	Total		2	0	0	0	0	0	0	0	2	0
Dijon B	2014–15	Amateur 2	21	3	—		—		—		21	3
Dijon	2014–15	Ligue 2	2	0	2	0	1	0	—		5	0
Real Sociedad B	2015–16	Segunda División B	29	5	—		—		—		29	5
Real Sociedad B	2016–17	Segunda División B	27	1	—		—		—		27	1
Real Sociedad B	Total		56	6	0	0	0	0	0	0	56	6
Real Sociedad	2016–17	La Liga	2	0	0	0	—		—		2	0
Real Sociedad	2017–18	La Liga	20	1	0	0	—		2 (Note: Appearances in UEFA Europa League)	0	22	1
Real Sociedad	2018–19	La Liga	7	0	0	0	—		—		7	0
Real Sociedad	2019–20	La Liga	1	0	0	0	—		—		1	0
Real Sociedad	Total		30	1	0	0	0	0	2	0	32	1
Leganés (loan)	2019–20	La Liga	26	1	1	0	—		—		27	1
Eibar (loan)	2020–21	La Liga	22	1	2	0	—		—		24	1
Rayo Vallecano (loan)	2021–22	La Liga	13	0	4	0	—		—		17	0
Adana Demirspor	2022–23	Süper Lig	33	2	1	0	—		—		34	2
Adana Demirspor	2023–24	Süper Lig	11	0	0	0	—		6 (Note: Appearances in UEFA Europa Conference League)	0	17	0
Adana Demirspor	Total		44	2	1	0	—		6	0	51	2
Career total			230	15	10	0	1	0	8	0	249	15

=== International ===
Appearances and goals by national team and year
National team	Year	Apps	Goals
Portugal	2017	1	0
Portugal	2018	2	0
Total		2	0

== Honours ==
Al-Qadsiah

- Saudi First Division League: 2023–24

France U19

- UEFA European Under-19 Championship runner-up: 2013
