= Josema Vivancos =

Spanish footballer

Personal information
- Full name: José Manuel Vivancos García
- Date of birth: 1 October 1999 (age 27)
- Place of birth: Cartagena, Spain
- Height: 1.82 m (6 ft 0 in)
- Position: Forward

Team information
- Current team: Bala Azul

Youth career
- Santa Ana
- Juvenia
- Ciudad Jardín
- 2016–2018: Torre Pacheco

Senior career*
Years	Team	Apps	(Gls)
2018–2021	Villarreal C	60	(16)
2021–2023	Cartagena B	41	(22)
2021	Cartagena	1	(0)
2023	La Unión Atlético	19	(3)
2023	Socuéllamos	11	(0)
2024	Balsicas Atlético	15	(8)
2024–	Bala Azul	4	(0)
- * Club domestic league appearances and goals as of 29 September 2024

José Manuel "Josema" Vivancos García (born 1 October 1999) is a Spanish professional footballer who plays as a forward for Bala Azul.

== Club career ==
Born in Miranda, Cartagena, Region of Murcia, Vivancos represented EF Santa Ana, CD Juvenia, EF Ciudad Jardín and EF Torre Pacheco as a youth. On 3 July 2018, after finishing his formation, he signed a contract with Villarreal CF and was assigned to the C-team in Tercera División.

Vivancos made his senior debut on 1 September 2018, coming on as a second-half substitute in a 2–0 home win over Elche CF Ilicitano. He scored his first goal on 12 October, netting the opener in a 4–2 home success against CD Acero.

On 6 July 2021, Vivancos joined hometown side FC Cartagena and was assigned to the reserves in Tercera División RFEF. He made his first team debut on 14 November, replacing Mo Dauda late into a 0–2 away loss against Girona FC in the Segunda División.
