= Xavi Pons =

Spanish footballer

Personal information
- Full name: Xavier Pons Foncillas
- Date of birth: 14 November 2000 (age 25)
- Place of birth: Les Masies de Voltregà, Spain
- Position: Midfielder

Team information
- Current team: Cieza

Youth career
- Gimnàstic Manresa
- 2015–2018: Damm
- 2018–2019: Lorca

Senior career*
Years	Team	Apps	(Gls)
2019–2020	Vic	22	(8)
2020	Águilas	7	(0)
2020–2021	Madridejos	25	(1)
2021–2022	Cartagena B	31	(1)
2021–2022	Cartagena	1	(0)
2022–2023	Socuéllamos	10	(1)
2023	Orihuela	11	(0)
2023–2024	Villarrobledo	28	(0)
2024–2025	Saguntino	30	(0)
2025–	Cieza	8	(1)
- * Club domestic league appearances and goals as of 9 November 2025

Xavier "Xavi" Pons Foncillas (born 14 November 2000) is a Spanish professional footballer who plays as a midfielder for Tercera Federación club Cieza.

== Club career ==
Born in Les Masies de Voltregà, Barcelona, Catalonia, Pons represented Club Gimnàstic de Manresa, CF Damm and Lorca FC as a youth. In March 2019, he moved to Primera Catalana side UE Vic, and made his senior debut on 28 April by playing the entire second half in a 1–1 home draw against Sant Cugat FC.

On 16 January 2020, Pons joined Tercera División side Águilas FC. In the middle of that year, he moved to fellow fourth tier side CD Madridejos.

On 2 July 2021, Pons signed for FC Cartagena and was initially assigned to the reserves in the Tercera División RFEF. He made his first team debut on 30 November, coming on as a late substitute for Neskes in a 2–0 away win over Racing Rioja CF in the season's Copa del Rey.

Pons made his professional debut on 2 January 2022, replacing Mo Dauda in a 1–0 away success over UD Almería in the Segunda División. On 25 June, he signed for Segunda Federación side UD Socuéllamos.
