= Álex Martín (footballer) =

Spanish footballer

Personal information
- Full name: José Alejandro Martín Valerón
- Date of birth: 25 January 1998 (age 28)
- Place of birth: Las Palmas, Spain
- Height: 1.82 m (6 ft 0 in)
- Position: Centre back

Team information
- Current team: Córdoba
- Number: 4

Youth career
- 2006–2013: Las Palmas
- 2013–2014: Betis
- 2014–2017: Real Madrid

Senior career*
Years	Team	Apps	(Gls)
2017–2019	Real Madrid B	29	(0)
2019–2020	Leganés	0	(0)
2019–2020	→ Cartagena (loan)	11	(0)
2020–2021	Cartagena	14	(1)
2021	Cádiz B	7	(1)
2021	Cádiz	2	(0)
2021–2022	Celta B	34	(2)
2022–2023	Mirandés	37	(1)
2023–2025	Elche	13	(0)
2024	→ Racing Ferrol (loan)	8	(0)
2025–	Córdoba	31	(0)

International career
2014–2015	Spain U17	14	(0)
2016–2017	Spain U19	7	(1)
2016	Spain U20	6	(0)
- * Club domestic league appearances and goals as of 6 June 2026

José Alejandro "Álex" Martín Valerón (born 25 January 1998) is a Spanish footballer who plays as a central defender for Córdoba CF.

== Club career ==
Martín was born in Las Palmas, Canary Islands, and joined Real Madrid's La Fábrica in 2014, after representing Real Betis and UD Las Palmas. Ahead of the 2017–18 season, he was promoted to the reserves in Segunda División B.

Martín made his senior debut on 24 September 2017, starting in a 1–2 away loss against CDA Navalcarnero. The following 26 January, he renewed his contract with the club until 2021.

On 8 July 2019, Martín signed a two-year deal with La Liga side CD Leganés, but was loaned to third division side FC Cartagena on 30 August. On 18 August of the following year, after achieving promotion with the latter side, he signed a permanent deal with the Efesé until 2022.

Martín made his professional debut on 13 September 2020, starting in a 0–0 away draw against Real Oviedo. He scored his first professional goal on 24 October, netting his team's second in a 3–0 home win against Las Palmas.

On 31 January 2021, Martín signed a 18-month contract with Cádiz CF, being initially assigned to the B-team. He made his La Liga debut with the main squad on 15 February, replacing Isaac Carcelén in a 0–4 home loss against Athletic Bilbao.

On 4 August 2021, Martín moved to another reserve team, Celta de Vigo B in Primera División RFEF. On 21 July of the following year, he moved to second division side CD Mirandés on a one-year deal.

On 6 July 2023, free agent Martín signed a two-year contract with Elche CF, recently relegated to division two. The following 16 January, after being rarely used, he moved to fellow league team Racing de Ferrol on loan for the remainder of the season.

Back to the Franjiverdes in July 2024, Martín was again a backup option as the club returned to the top tier. On 2 July 2025, he agreed to a two-year deal with Córdoba CF.

== Career statistics ==
As of match played 13 May 2023

Appearances and goals by club, season and competition
Club	Season	League			National Cup		Europe		Other		Total	
Club	Season	Division	Apps	Goals	Apps	Goals	Apps	Goals	Apps	Goals	Apps	Goals
Real Madrid B	2017–18	Segunda División B	13	0	—		—		—		13	0
Real Madrid B	2018–19	Segunda División B	16	0	—		—		2	0	18	0
Real Madrid B	Subtotal		29	0	—		—		2	0	31	0
Cartagena	2019–20	Segunda División B	11	0	2	1	—		1	0	14	1
Cartagena	2020–21	Segunda División	14	1	1	0	—		—		15	1
Cartagena	Subtotal		25	1	3	1	—		1	0	29	2
Cádiz B	2020–21	Segunda División B	7	0	—		—		—		7	0
Cádiz	2020–21	La Liga	2	0	—		—		—		2	0
Celta B	2021–22	Primera División RFEF	34	2	—		—		—		34	2
Mirandés	2022–23	Segunda División	37	1	1	0	—		—		38	1
Career total			134	4	4	1	0	0	3	0	141	5
