= La Puerta de Segura =

- Municipality
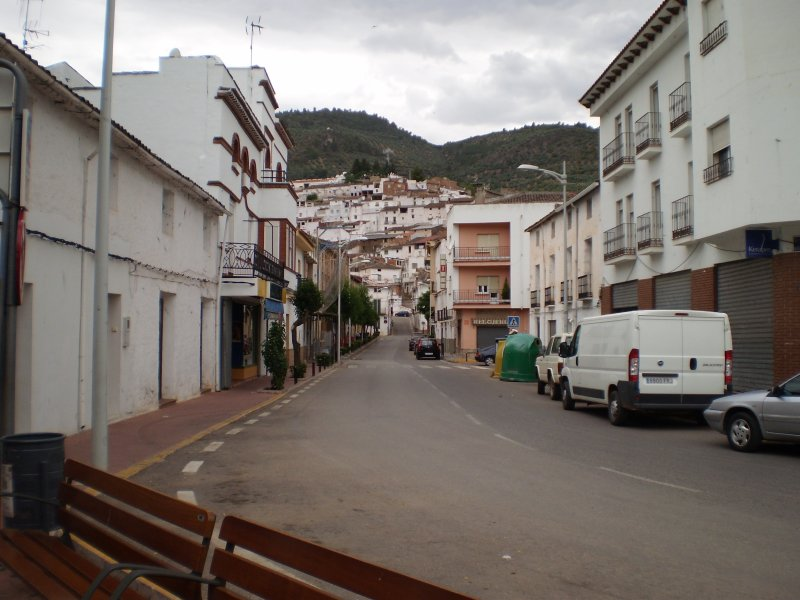
- Pablo Iglesias Street

- Coat of arms

- Location in the Province of Jaén La Puerta de Segura (Andalusia) La Puerta de Segura (Spain)
- Coordinates: 38°20′59″N 02°44′12″W
- Country: Spain
- Autonomous community: Andalusia
- Province: Jaén
- Comarca: Sierra de Segura

Government
  - Mayor (Alcalde): Virtudes Puertas Soria (PPA)

Area
  - Total: 98 km^{2} (38 sq mi)
- Elevation: 585 m (1,919 ft)

Population (2025-01-01)
  - Total: 2,223
  - Density: 23/km^{2} (59/sq mi)
- Time zone: UTC+1 (CET)
  - Summer (DST): UTC+2 (CEST)
- Website: lapuertadesegura.es

La Puerta de Segura is a city and municipality located in the province of Jaén, part of the autonomous community of Andalusia in southern Spain. According to the 2005 census (INE), the city has a population of 2,646 inhabitants.

== See also ==
- List of municipalities in Jaén
