= David Forniés =

Spanish footballer (born 1991)

Personal information
- Full name: David Forniés Aquilino
- Date of birth: 2 June 1991 (age 35)
- Place of birth: Elche, Spain
- Height: 1.77 m (5 ft 9 1/2 in)
- Position: Left-back

Team information
- Current team: Español San Vicente

Youth career
- 1995–2001: Zafiro
- 2001–2002: Elche
- 2002–2010: Valencia

Senior career*
Years	Team	Apps	(Gls)
2010–2011	Valencia B	18	(0)
2011–2013	Zaragoza B	58	(0)
2013–2014	Getafe B	27	(0)
2014	Alcorcón	0	(0)
2014–2015	Lleida Esportiu	25	(3)
2015–2016	Sabadell	20	(1)
2016–2017	Cultural Leonesa	28	(0)
2017–2019	Murcia	59	(1)
2019–2021	Cartagena	49	(1)
2021–2022	Alcorcón	18	(0)
2022–2025	Atlético Baleares	50	(1)
2025	Athletic Torrellano	9	(0)
2026–	Español San Vicente	21	(0)
- * Club domestic league appearances and goals as of 20:13, 28 October 2026 (UTC)

David Forniés Aquilino (born 2 June 1991) is a Spanish professional footballer who plays as a left-back for Tercera Federación club CD Español de San Vicente.

== Club career ==
A Valencia CF youth graduate, Forniés was born in Elche, Province of Alicante. He made his senior debut with their reserves in 2010, in the Tercera División. In 2011 he moved to another reserve team, Deportivo Aragón of Segunda División B.

In summer 2013, after suffering relegation to the fourth division, Forniés joined Getafe CF B one league above. On 10 July 2014 he agreed to a two-year contract with Segunda División club AD Alcorcón, but severed his ties on 20 August.

Forniés returned to the third tier on 22 August 2014, after signing for Lleida Esportiu. He remained in the division the following years, representing CE Sabadell FC, Cultural y Deportiva Leonesa, Real Murcia CF and FC Cartagena; he achieved promotions with Cultural and Cartagena, in 2017 and 2020 respectively.

Forniés made his professional debut on 13 September 2020 at the age of 29, starting in the 0–0 away draw against Real Oviedo. He scored his first league goal the following 7 March, but in a 2–1 loss at RCD Mallorca.

On 1 August 2021, Forniés returned to Alcorcón on a one-year deal. At its termination, he joined CD Atlético Baleares in the Primera Federación.

== Honours ==
Cultural Leonesa

- Segunda División B: 2016–17
