= Teddy Sutherland =

English footballer

Personal information
- Full name: Edward Campbell Sutherland
- Date of birth: 28 March 2000 (age 26)
- Place of birth: London, England
- Height: 1.72 m (5 ft 8 in)
- Position: Winger

Team information
- Current team: Ruch Chorzów
- Number: 10

Youth career
- 2004–2011: Cartagena
- 2011–2016: Villarreal
- 2016–2017: Cartagena
- 2018–2019: Getafe

Senior career*
Years	Team	Apps	(Gls)
2017	Cartagena	1	(0)
2017–2018	Cartagena B	27	(1)
2019–2020	Elche B	21	(0)
2020–2023	Cartagena B	58	(17)
2021	Cartagena	6	(0)
2021–2022	→ Atlético Madrid B (loan)	34	(5)
2023–2024	Linares Deportivo	17	(0)
2024	UE Cornellà	15	(2)
2024–2025	Yeclano	37	(3)
2025–2026	Teruel	29	(4)
2026–	Ruch Chorzów	0	(0)
- * Club domestic league appearances and goals as of 10 June 2026

Edward "Teddy" Campbell Sutherland (born 28 March 2000) is an English professional footballer who plays as a winger for I liga club Ruch Chorzów.

== Club career ==
Sutherland was born in London, England and moved to Spain with his family to Cartagena, Spain at the age of four. He soon after joined the youth academy of FC Cartagena, and at 11 had a stint with Villarreal CF.

Sutherland returned to Cartagena in 2016, being assigned to affiliate club EF Ciudad Jardín. He made his senior – and first team – debut on 14 May 2017, coming on as a late substitute for Germán Sáenz in a 0–0 Segunda División B home draw against Recreativo de Huelva.

Sutherland was assigned to the reserves in Tercera División for the 2017–18 season, and featured regularly for the side before agreeing to a three-year contract with Getafe CF in July 2018; at the latter side, he appeared exclusively for the Juvenil squad. On 16 July 2019, he moved to another reserve team, Elche CF Ilicitano also in the fourth tier.

Sutherland returned to Cartagena on 18 September 2020, being initially assigned to the B-team. He made his professional debut with the Efesé the following 22 March, replacing Elady Zorrilla late into a 0–2 away loss to Albacete Balompié.

On 2 September 2021, Sutherland moved to Atlético Madrid on loan for one year, and was assigned to the B-team in Tercera División RFEF.

In February 2024, Sutherland left Linares Deportivo to join fellow Primera Federación side UE Cornellà on a free transfer.

In July 2024, Sutherland joined newly promoted Primera Federación side Yeclano Deportivo.

In July 2025, Sutherland joined newly promoted Primera Federación side Teruel.

On 29 August 2026, Sutherland signed for Polish second division side Ruch Chorzów until June 2027, with an option for another year.
