= Farru =

Spanish footballer (born 2001)

Personal information
- Full name: José María Pérez García
- Date of birth: 25 February 2001 (age 25)
- Place of birth: Lorca, Spain
- Height: 1.83 m (6 ft 0 in)
- Position: Centre back

Team information
- Current team: Tondela
- Number: 6

Youth career
- Lorca CFB
- 2019–2020: Almería

Senior career*
Years	Team	Apps	(Gls)
2018–2019	Lorca	1	(0)
2020–2023	Cartagena B	61	(4)
2021–2023	Cartagena	4	(0)
2023–2025	Alcoyano	55	(1)
2025–2026	Unionistas	35	(0)
2026–	Tondela	6	(0)
- * Club domestic league appearances and goals as of 12 September 2026

José María Pérez García (born 25 February 2001), commonly known as Farru, is a Spanish footballer who plays as a central defender for Liga Portugal 2 club Tondela.

== Club career ==
Born in Lorca, Region of Murcia, Farru was a youth product of Lorca CFB, the youth side of Lorca FC. He made his first team debut with the club on 26 August 2018, coming on as a late substitute in a 4–1 Tercera División home routing of EDMF Churra.

On 17 May 2019, Farru signed for UD Almería and returned to the youth setup. On 20 August 2020, he joined FC Cartagena and was assigned to the reserves in the fourth division.

On 27 October 2021, Farru renewed his contract with the Efesé until 2024. He made his debut with the main squad on 30 November, starting in a 2–0 away win over Racing Rioja CF in the season's Copa del Rey.

Farru made his professional debut on 30 October 2022, replacing Jairo Izquierdo late into a 0–0 home draw against Granada CF in the Segunda División.

On 22 August 2023, Cartagena announced the transfer of Farru to Primera Federación side CD Alcoyano.
