= Iker Goujón =

Spanish footballer

Personal information
- Full name: Iker Goujón Pozuelo
- Date of birth: 18 August 1999 (age 27)
- Place of birth: Tarragona, Spain
- Height: 1.73 m (5 ft 8 in)
- Position: Winger

Youth career
- Santes Creus
- 2011–2013: Barcelona
- 2013–2018: Reus

Senior career*
Years	Team	Apps	(Gls)
2018–2019	Reus B	24	(1)
2019–2021	Andorra	30	(4)
2021–2023	Villarreal B	11	(2)
2023–2024	Barcelona B	5	(1)
- * Club domestic league appearances and goals as of 25 December 2023

Iker Goujón Pozuelo (born 18 August 1999) is a Spanish footballer who plays as a left winger.

== Club career ==
Born in Tarragona, Catalonia, Goujón joined FC Barcelona's La Masia in 2011, from CE Santes Creus. He left in 2013, and finished his formation with CF Reus Deportiu.

Goujón made his senior debut with the reserves on 26 August 2018, playing the last 25 minutes in a 2–1 Tercera División home loss against FC Vilafranca, and scored his first goal on 10 February of the following year in a 3–2 loss at CE Europa. On 23 July 2019, he moved to FC Andorra in Segunda División B.

On 28 May 2021, Goujón signed a two-year contract with Villarreal CF, being assigned to the B-team in Primera División RFEF. He featured in just ten matches during the season, scoring twice as his side achieved promotion to Segunda División.

After spending most of the 2022–23 campaign nursing a serious injury, Goujón made his professional debut with the B's on 27 May 2023, coming on as a second-half substitute for Álex Millán in a 4–3 Segunda División away loss against his former side Andorra.

On 1 September 2023, Goujón returned to Barça on a one-year contract, being assigned to the reserves in the third division.

== Career statistics ==
=== Club ===
As of match played 16 December 2023

Appearances and goals by club, season and competition
Club	Season	League			Copa del Rey		Other		Total	
Club	Season	Division	Apps	Goals	Apps	Goals	Apps	Goals	Apps	Goals
Reus Deportiu B	2018–19	Tercera División	24	1	—		—		24	1
Andorra	2019–20	Segunda División B	12	2	1	0	—		13	2
Andorra	2020–21	Segunda División B	18	2	1	0	1 (Note: Appearances in Segunda División B play-offs)	0	20	2
Andorra	Total		30	4	2	0	1	0	33	4
Villarreal B	2021–22	Primera División RFEF	10	2	—		0	0	10	2
Villarreal B	2022–23	Segunda División	1	0	—		—		1	0
Villarreal B	Total		11	2	0	0	0	0	11	2
Barcelona B	2023–24	Primera Federación	5	1	—		—		5	1
Career total			70	8	2	0	1	0	73	8
