= Neskes =

Spanish footballer (born 2001)

Personal information
- Full name: Alejandro Domingo Gómez
- Date of birth: 22 November 2001 (age 24)
- Place of birth: Granada, Spain
- Height: 1.78 m (5 ft 10 in)
- Position: Attacking midfielder

Team information
- Current team: Guadalajara
- Number: 7

Youth career
- 2009–2015: Maracena
- 2015–2020: Granada

Senior career*
Years	Team	Apps	(Gls)
2020–2023	Cartagena B	32	(3)
2021–2023	Cartagena	27	(0)
2023	→ Unionistas (loan)	9	(0)
2023	Ibiza	2	(0)
2023–2024	Teruel	7	(1)
2024–	Guadalajara	68	(6)
- * Club domestic league appearances and goals as of 10 June 2026

Alejandro Domingo Gómez (born 22 November 2001), commonly known as Neskes or Neeskens, is a Spanish professional footballer who plays as an attacking midfielder for Guadalajara in the Spanish Segunda Federación.

== Club career ==
Born in Granada, Andalusia, Neskes joined Granada CF's youth setup in 2015, from UD Maracena. On 7 September 2020, after finishing his formation, he signed for FC Cartagena and was assigned to the reserves in Tercera División.

Neskes made his senior debut on 18 October 2020, starting in a 2–0 home win against Racing Murcia FC. He scored his first senior goal on 20 December, netting his team's fifth in a 7–0 home routing of Lorca FC.

Neskes made his first team debut on 16 August 2021, coming on as a second-half substitute for Richard Boateng in a 1–3 home loss against UD Almería. On 8 September, he renewed his contract until 2024.

On 28 January 2023, Neskes was loaned to Primera Federación side Unionistas de Salamanca CF for the remainder of the season. He terminated his contract with the Efesé on 21 August, and moved to third division side UD Ibiza on a one-year deal just hours later.

On 6 July 2024, Neskes signed with Guadalajara in Segunda Federación.

== Personal life ==
Neskes' brother José Francisco is also a footballer and a midfielder, who was also groomed at Granada. Their father José Domingo also played as a senior for the club, but never appeared professionally.
