= Kleandro Lleshi =

Albanian footballer

Personal information
- Date of birth: 9 October 1999 (age 27)
- Place of birth: Lezhë, Albania
- Height: 1.89 m (6 ft 2 in)
- Position: Midfielder

Youth career
- 2011–2012: Olimpiku Tirana
- 2012–2014: Marko Fut
- 2014–2016: Internacional Tirana
- 2016–2017: Belenenses
- 2017–2018: Leganés

Senior career*
Years	Team	Apps	(Gls)
2018–2020	Leganés B	38	(2)
2019–2020	→ Fuenlabrada (loan)	0	(0)
2020	→ Recreativo (loan)	2	(1)
2020–2021	Cartagena	3	(0)
2021	Cartagena B	6	(0)
2022–2023	Mar Menor	34	(0)
2024	Kukësi	11	(0)
2024–2025	Laçi	30	(0)
2025–2026	Tirana	27	(0)

International career
2017–2018	Albania U19	6	(0)
2019–2020	Albania U21	3	(0)
- * Club domestic league appearances and goals as of 1 June 2024

Kleandro Lleshi (born 9 October 1999) is an Albanian footballer who plays as a central midfielder.

== Club career ==
Born in Lezhë, Lleshi started his career at his home country before moving to Portugal in 2016 and joining C.F. Os Belenenses. In September 2017, he moved to CD Leganés and was initially assigned to the under-20 squad.

Lleshi made his senior debut with Leganés' B-team on 11 February 2018, playing the last 13 minutes in a 1–2 Tercera División away loss against RSD Alcalá. He scored his first goal fourteen days later, netting the opener in a 5–0 away routing of CDF Tres Cantos.

In August 2019, after being a regular starter for Leganés B during the 2018–19 season, Lleshi was loaned to Segunda División newcomers CF Fuenlabrada for one year. He made his debut for the club on 17 December, starting in a 1–0 away win against Peña Sport FC for the season's Copa del Rey.

On 22 January 2020, Lleshi was loaned to Recreativo de Huelva in Segunda División B until the end of the campaign. On 10 August, he signed a one-year deal with FC Cartagena, newly promoted to the second division, on a free transfer.

Lleshi made his professional debut on 27 March 2021, coming on as a late substitute for Pablo Clavería in a 1–1 home draw against Málaga CF. After another two first team appearances, he left the Efesé in July 2021 as his contract expired.

On 18 January 2022, Lleshi signed with Segunda División RFEF club Mar Menor FC, as a free agent.
