= Richard Boateng (footballer, born 1992) =

Ghanaian footballer

Personal information
- Full name: Richard Boateng Welbeck
- Date of birth: 10 July 1992 (age 34)
- Place of birth: Accra, Ghana
- Height: 1.80 m (5 ft 11 in)
- Position: Midfielder

Youth career
- Liberty Babies

Senior career*
Years	Team	Apps	(Gls)
2009–2010	Liberty Professionals	28	(0)
2010–2016	Granada B	103	(18)
2012	→ Cádiz B (loan)	13	(1)
2012–2013	→ San Roque (loan)	36	(2)
2014	Granada	1	(0)
2016–2017	Aris Limassol	0	(0)
2017	Extremadura	10	(2)
2017–2018	Melilla	31	(14)
2018–2019	Oviedo	13	(0)
2019	→ Alcorcón (loan)	12	(0)
2019–2021	Alcorcón	62	(5)
2021–2022	Cartagena	26	(2)
2022–2023	Maccabi Bnei Reineh	31	(5)
2023–2024	Hapoel Petah Tikva	2	(0)
2024–2025	Real Murcia	21	(0)
- * Club domestic league appearances and goals

Richard Boateng Welbeck (born 10 July 1992) is a Ghanaian former professional footballer who played as a central midfielder.

== Club career ==
Born in Accra, Boateng made his senior debuts with Liberty Professionals FC, but moved to Spain in the 2010 summer, joining Granada CF's reserve team in the regional leagues. On 26 January 2012 he was loaned to Cádiz CF, but only appeared with the B-side in Tercera División.

On 27 July 2012, Boateng moved to CD San Roque de Lepe in Segunda División B, also in a temporary deal; he appeared in 36 matches (2511 minutes of action), scoring two goals, but the Andalusians were relegated nonetheless. Upon returning he was assigned to Granada's B-side, now also in the third division.

On 28 February 2014 Boateng played his first match as a professional, coming on as a second-half substitute in a 0–4 La Liga loss at Athletic Bilbao. He spent the remainder of his spell with the B-side, however.

On 1 January 2017, after an unassuming spell at Aris Limassol FC, Boateng joined third-tier side Extremadura UD. On 3 August, he moved to fellow league team UD Melilla.

Boateng scored a career-best 14 goals for Melilla during his first campaign, including braces against Betis Deportivo Balompié, Córdoba CF B and former side Granada B. On 15 June 2018, he signed a two-year contract with Segunda División side Real Oviedo.

On 28 January 2019, Boateng moved to fellow second division side AD Alcorcón on loan until June. On 15 July, after featuring regularly, he signed a permanent two-year contract with the Alfareros.

On 16 June 2021, free agent Boateng agreed to a contract with FC Cartagena, also in the second division.

On 2 June 2023, he signed for Israeli Premier League club Hapoel Petah Tikva.

On 6 July 2024, Boateng moved to Real Murcia in the Spanish third tier.
