= Alberto Cayarga =

Spanish footballer

Berto Cayarga
Personal information
- Full name: Alberto Cayarga Fernández
- Date of birth: 17 September 1996 (age 30)
- Place of birth: Avilés, Spain
- Height: 1.70 m (5 ft 7 in)
- Position: Winger

Team information
- Current team: Avilés
- Number: 14

Youth career
- Navarro
- 2013–2014: Llano 2000
- 2014–2015: Sporting Gijón

Senior career*
Years	Team	Apps	(Gls)
2014	Llano 2000	1	(0)
2015–2018	Sporting B	62	(11)
2015–2016	→ Langreo (loan)	26	(3)
2018–2020	Racing Santander	42	(4)
2020–2022	Cartagena	79	(6)
2023	Radomiak Radom	18	(0)
2023–2024	Deportivo La Coruña	16	(0)
2024–2025	Real Unión	29	(1)
2025–	Avilés	35	(4)
- * Club domestic league appearances and goals as of 9 June 2026

Alberto "Berto" Cayarga Fernández (born 17 September 1996) is a Spanish professional footballer who plays as a winger for Primera Federación club Avilés.

== Club career ==
Born in Avilés, Asturias, Cayarga joined Sporting de Gijón's youth setup in 2014, after already making his senior debut with SD Llano 2000. In July 2015, after finishing his formation, he was loaned to Tercera División side UP Langreo for one year.

Upon returning, Cayarga agreed to a two-year contract and was assigned to the reserves, now also in the fourth tier. He helped the B-team in their promotion in his first season, and scored a career-best nine goals in his second, as his side missed out a second consecutive promotion in the play-offs.

On 7 August 2018, Cayarga signed a two-year deal with Segunda División B side Racing de Santander. He was a first-choice for the Cantabrian side, which achieved promotion to Segunda División.

Cayarga made his professional debut on 17 August 2019, starting in a 0–1 home loss against Málaga CF. The following 31 January, he terminated his contract with Racing, and signed a six-month deal with third division side FC Cartagena, with option for a further year, just hours later.

Cayarga scored his first professional goal on 6 February 2021, netting his team's second in a 2–0 home win over Real Oviedo. He left the club on 1 July 2022, after his contract expired.

On 3 January 2023, after six months without a club, Cayarga joined Polish Ekstraklasa side Radomiak Radom on a deal until the end of the season with an extension option. On 8 February that year, after just two league appearances, the option in his contract was exercised, tying Cayarga with the club until 2025.

On 24 August 2023, after asking to be released from his contract so that he could return to Spain, Cayarga signed a two-year deal with Deportivo de La Coruña in Primera Federación. On 29 August of the following year, after achieving promotion to division two, he terminated his link and joined Real Unión just hours later.
