= Uri (footballer) =

Argentine footballer

Personal information
- Full name: Uriel Jové Balero
- Date of birth: 29 July 1999 (age 27)
- Place of birth: Carmen, Argentina
- Height: 1.89 m (6 ft 2 in)
- Position: Centre back

Team information
- Current team: Águilas
- Number: 17

Youth career
- 2008–2014: Hércules
- 2014–2016: El Campello
- 2016–2018: Kelme

Senior career*
Years	Team	Apps	(Gls)
2018	Rayo Ibense	0	(0)
2018–2019	Estudiantes Murcia	32	(3)
2019–2023	Cartagena B	56	(8)
2019–2023	Cartagena	3	(0)
2021–2022	→ Águilas (loan)	20	(1)
2023–2024	Yeclano	9	(0)
2024–2025	Torrent	47	(3)
2025–	Águilas	4	(1)
- * Club domestic league appearances and goals as of 28 September 2025

Uriel Jové Balero (born 29 July 1999), commonly known as Uri, is an Argentine footballer who plays as a central defender for Spanish Segunda Federación club Águilas.

== Club career ==
Born in Carmen, General López Department, Santa Fe, Uri moved to Alicante, Valencian Community at early age and represented Hércules CF, CD El Campello and Kelme CF as a youth. On 5 August 2018, after finishing his formation, he joined Tercera División side UD Rayo Ibense, but left the club in the following month.

Uri subsequently moved to fellow fourth division side Estudiantes de Murcia CF, and made his senior debut on 16 September 2018 by starting in a 1–2 home loss against CAP Ciudad de Murcia. He scored his first goal the following 3 February, netting the equalizer in a 1–1 away draw against the same club.

On 27 June 2019, Uri signed for FC Cartagena and was assigned to the reserves also in the fourth tier. On 17 August of the following year, after contributed with two first team appearances as the side achieved promotion to Segunda División, he renewed his contract until 2023 and was definitely promoted to the main squad.

Uri made his professional debut on 27 September 2020, starting in a 1–3 away loss against CD Leganés. On 31 August of the following year, he moved to Segunda División RFEF side Águilas FC on a one-year loan deal.
