= Elady Zorrilla =

Spanish footballer

Elady
Personal information
- Full name: Eladio Zorrilla Jiménez
- Date of birth: 13 July 1990 (age 36)
- Place of birth: La Puerta de Segura, Spain
- Height: 1.78 m (5 ft 10 in)
- Position: Winger

Team information
- Current team: Atlético Mancha Real

Youth career
- Orcera
- 2008: La Puerta

Senior career*
Years	Team	Apps	(Gls)
2007–2008	Orcera	?	(3)
2008–2010	La Puerta	60	(14)
2010–2012	Villacarrillo	57	(13)
2012–2013	Jaén	11	(1)
2013–2014	Villacarrillo	31	(18)
2014	La Hoya Lorca	0	(0)
2014	Villacarrillo	3	(0)
2014–2015	Écija	17	(2)
2015	Linares	12	(2)
2015–2017	Mancha Real	55	(31)
2017–2018	Murcia	43	(13)
2018	Cracovia	2	(0)
2018–2021	Cartagena	97	(33)
2021–2024	Tenerife	73	(14)
2024	→ Huesca (loan)	18	(5)
2024–2025	Intercity	15	(1)
2025	Burgos	7	(0)
2025–	Atlético Mancha Real	6	(0)
- * Club domestic league appearances and goals as of 2 November 2025

Eladio Zorrilla Jiménez (born 13 July 1990), commonly known as Elady, is a Spanish footballer who plays for Tercera Federación club Atlético Mancha Real. Mainly a left winger, he can also play as a forward.

== Club career ==
Born in La Puerta de Segura, Jaén, Andalusia, Elady made his senior debut with Orcera CF in the regional leagues. In 2008 he moved to La Puerta CD; initially assigned to the youth setup, he became a first-team regular during his two-season spell.

In 2010 Elady signed for Villacarrillo CF, still in the lower levels. On 10 July 2012, after helping the side in their promotion to Tercera División, he moved straight to Segunda División B after agreeing to a contract with Real Jaén.

On 15 July 2013, after being rarely used, Elady returned to Villacarrillo, now in the fourth tier. The following 1 July he signed for La Hoya Lorca CF, but cut ties with the club on 26 August and subsequently returned to his previous club.

On 3 October 2014, Elady joined fellow fourth division side Écija Balompié, but left the club the following January and signed for Linares Deportivo in the same category. On 14 July 2015 he moved to Atlético Mancha Real, scoring a career-best 21 goals during his first campaign, which ended in promotion.

On 18 January 2017, after scoring ten goals in only 20 matches, Elady signed a 18-month contract with Real Murcia in the third division. On 17 July 2018, after contributing with 12 goals as his side missed out promotion in the play-offs, he moved abroad and joined KS Cracovia on a two-year deal.

Elady made his professional debut on 29 July 2018, playing the entire second half in a 0–2 away loss against KKS Lech Poznań for the Ekstraklasa championship. After only one more match, he returned to his home country and agreed to a deal with FC Cartagena on 9 August.

Elady was a regular starter for the Efesé during his first campaigns, scoring a career-best 19 goals in his first season and adding a further seven in his second, as the club achieved promotion to Segunda División. He scored his first professional goal on 4 October 2020 at the age of 30, netting the opener in a 2–1 home win over CD Lugo.

On 14 July 2021, Elady signed a two-year deal with fellow second division side CD Tenerife. On 26 January 2024, he was loaned to SD Huesca in the same category until the end of the campaign.

On 12 July 2024, Elady terminated his contract with Tete, and signed with Primera Federación side CF Intercity on 21 August. The following 3 February, he returned to the second division after agreeing to a six-month deal with Burgos CF.
