= David Andújar =

Spanish footballer (born 1991)

Personal information
- Full name: David Andújar Jiménez
- Date of birth: 21 August 1991 (age 35)
- Place of birth: Torrejón de Ardoz, Spain
- Height: 1.89 m (6 ft 2 in)
- Position: Centre back

Team information
- Current team: Ponferradina
- Number: 2

Youth career
- Torrejón

Senior career*
Years	Team	Apps	(Gls)
2009–2012	Torrejón		
2012–2016	Coslada	93+	(18+)
2016–2017	Móstoles	23	(3)
2017–2019	Rayo Majadahonda	48	(4)
2019–2022	Cartagena	66	(5)
2022–2023	Tianjin Jinmen Tiger	44	(3)
2024–	Ponferradina	55	(5)
- * Club domestic league appearances and goals as of 25 May 2026

David Andújar Jiménez (born 21 August 1991) is a Spanish footballer who plays as a central defender for Primera Federación club Ponferradina.

== Club career ==
Born in Torrejón de Ardoz, Madrid, Andújar was an AD Torrejón CF youth graduate, making his senior debut for the club in 2009, in the regional leagues. In 2012 he signed for CD Coslada, remaining in the lower levels.

A regular starter and captain for Coslada, Andújar returned to the fourth division after signing for CD Móstoles URJC on 2 July 2016. The following 17 June, he agreed to a contract with Segunda División B side CF Rayo Majadahonda.

An immediate first-choice, Andújar contributed with three goals in 34 appearances during the campaign as his side achieved promotion to Segunda División for the first time ever. After sustaining an injury, he made his professional debut on 11 November, starting in a 2–0 home defeat of UD Almería.

On 11 July 2019, after suffering relegation, Andújar signed a two-year deal with FC Cartagena in the third division. He helped the club in their promotion to the second division in 2020, being a regular starter.

On 20 March 2022, Andújar left the Efesé after the club announced his transfer to an unnamed foreign club, eventually joining Tianjin Jinmen Tiger.

On 15 January 2024, Andújar returned to his home country to join Ponferradina.

== Career statistics ==
As of match played 10 June 2025

Appearances and goals by club, season and competition
Club	Season	League			Cup		Other		Total	
Club	Season	Division	Apps	Goals	Apps	Goals	Apps	Goals	Apps	Goals
Móstoles	2016–17	Tercera División	23	3	—		1	0	24	3
Rayo Majadahonda	2017–18	Segunda División B	34	3	1	0	6	0	41	3
Rayo Majadahonda	2018–19	Segunda División	14	1	0	0	—		14	1
Rayo Majadahonda	Total		48	4	1	0	6	0	55	4
Cartagena	2019–20	Segunda División B	25	2	2	0	1	0	28	2
Cartagena	2020–21	Segunda División	25	3	1	0	—		26	3
Cartagena	2021–22	Segunda División	16	0	2	0	—		18	0
Cartagena	Total		66	5	5	0	1	0	72	5
Tianjin Jinmen Tiger	2022	Chinese Super League	22	1	0	0	—		22	1
Tianjin Jinmen Tiger	2023	Chinese Super League	22	2	2	0	—		24	2
Tianjin Jinmen Tiger	Total		44	3	2	0	—		46	3
Ponferradina	2023–24	Primera Federación	16	1	—		2	0	18	1
Ponferradina	2024–25	Primera Federación	19	2	1	0	2	0	22	2
Ponferradina	Total		35	3	1	0	4	0	40	3
Career total			216	18	9	0	11	0	236	18
