= Mohammed Dauda =

Ghanaian footballer

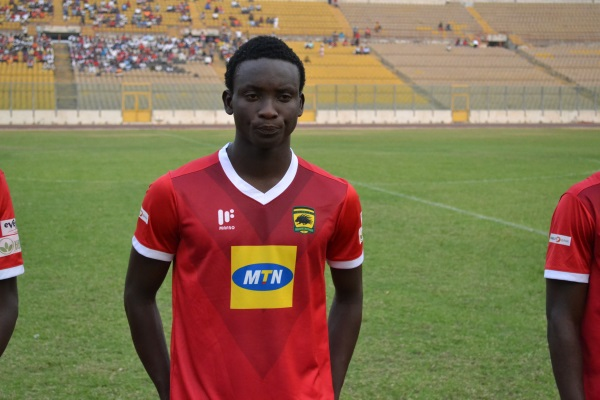
- Dauda with Asante Kotoko in 2016

Personal information
- Date of birth: 20 February 1998 (age 28)
- Place of birth: Suhum, Ghana
- Height: 1.76 m (5 ft 9 in)
- Position: Forward

Team information
- Current team: Lugo
- Number: 11

Senior career*
Years	Team	Apps	(Gls)
2016–2017	Asante Kotoko	20	(8)
2017–2023	Anderlecht	24	(1)
2019	→ Vitesse (loan)	16	(3)
2019–2020	→ Esbjerg fB (loan)	22	(4)
2021–2022	→ Cartagena (loan)	35	(9)
2022–2023	→ Tenerife (loan)	27	(4)
2023–2025	Tenerife	11	(0)
2024	→ Eldense (loan)	14	(0)
2024–2025	→ Ibiza (loan)	18	(6)
2025–2026	Portimonense	24	(2)
2026–	Lugo	3	(0)

International career
	Ghana U20	7	(4)
	Ghana U23	3	(0)
- * Club domestic league appearances and goals as of 13 September 2026

Mohammed Dauda (born 20 February 1998), commonly known as Mo Dauda, is a Ghanaian professional footballer who plays as a forward for Spanish Primera Federación club Lugo.

== Club career ==
On 31 August 2021, Dauda moved on loan from Anderlecht to FC Cartagena in the Spanish Segunda División.

On 22 July 2022, Anderlecht announced that they had loaned Dauda to Spanish Segunda División side CD Tenerife for the 2022–23 season. In May 2023, he signed a permanent three-year contract with the club.

On 12 January 2024, Dauda was loaned to fellow second division side CD Eldense until June. On 22 August, he moved to Primera Federación side UD Ibiza also in a temporary deal.

On 9 September 2025, Dauda signed a two-season contract with Portimonense in Liga Portugal 2.
