= 2026–27 RCD Espanyol season =

RCD Espanyol
2026–27 season
- President: Alan Pace
- Head coach: Manolo González
- Stadium: RCDE Stadium
- La Liga: 15th
- Copa del Rey: First round
Home colours	Away colours	Third colours

The 2026–27 season is the 127th season in the history of RCD Espanyol, and the club's third consecutive season in La Liga. In addition to the domestic league, the club is participating in the Copa del Rey.

== Players ==
=== First-team squad ===
As of 2 September 2026

Note: Flags indicate national team as defined under FIFA eligibility rules; some limited exceptions apply. Players may hold more than one non-FIFA nationality.

No.	Pos.	Nation	Player
1	GK	ESP	Ángel Fortuño
2	DF	ESP	Andoni Gorosabel (on loan from Athletic Bilbao)
3	DF	NED	Quilindschy Hartman (on loan from Burnley)
4	MF	ESP	Urko González de Zárate
5	DF	GER	Clemens Riedel
6	DF	URU	Leandro Cabrera (captain)
7	FW	ESP	Javi Puado (vice-captain)
8	MF	ESP	Edu Expósito
9	FW	ESP	Roberto Fernández
10	MF	ESP	Pol Lozano (3rd captain)
11	FW	ESP	Pere Milla
13	GK	SRB	Marko Dmitrović
14	DF	ESP	Unai Nuñez (on loan from Celta Vigo)

No.	Pos.	Nation	Player
15	FW	ESP	Bryan Zaragoza (on loan from Bayern Munich)
16	DF	SLO	Vanja Drkušić (on loan from Zenit Saint Petersburg)
17	FW	ESP	Jofre Carreras
18	FW	ESP	Marcos Fernández
19	FW	ESP	Kike García
20	MF	BRA	Gabriel Moscardo (on loan from Paris Saint-Germain)
21	DF	ESP	Roger Hinojo
22	MF	ESP	Álex Calatrava
23	DF	MAR	Omar El Hilali
24	FW	ENG	Tyrhys Dolan
26	MF	ESP	Rafel Bauzà
28	FW	ESP	Javi Hernández

=== Out on loan ===
Note: Flags indicate national team as defined under FIFA eligibility rules; some limited exceptions apply. Players may hold more than one non-FIFA nationality.

No.	Pos.	Nation	Player
—	DF	ESP	José Salinas (at Málaga until 30 June 2027)
—	MF	ESP	José Gragera (at Burgos until 30 June 2027)

No.	Pos.	Nation	Player
—	FW	ESP	Antoniu Roca (at Mallorca until 30 June 2027)
—	FW	MAR	Omar Sadik (at Ceuta until 30 June 2027)

== Transfers ==
=== In ===
Date	Pos.	Nat.	Player	From	Type	Ref.
2 July 2026	MF	(Spain)	Álex Calatrava	(Spain) Castellón	Transfer	

==== Loans in ====
Date	Pos.	Nat.	Player	From	Duration	Ref.
7 July 2026	MF	(Netherlands)	Quilindschy Hartman	(England) Burnley	End of season	
8 July 2026	DF	(Brazil)	Gabriel Moscardo	(France) Paris Saint-Germain	End of season	
6 August 2026	DF	(Spain)	Unai Nuñez	(Spain) Celta Vigo	End of season	
14 August 2026	DF	(Slovenia)	Vanja Drkušić	(Russia) Zenit Saint Petersburg	End of season	
27 August 2026	MF	(Spain)	Bryan Zaragoza	(Germany) Bayern Munich	End of season	
1 September 2026	DF	(Spain)	Andoni Gorosabel	(Spain) Athletic Bilbao	End of season	

=== Out ===
Date	Pos.	Nat.	Player	To	Type	Ref.
1 July 2026	DF	(Spain)	Hugo Pérez	(Portugal) Torreense	Free transfer	
14 July 2026	DF	(Spain)	Fernando Calero	(Spain) Málaga	Free transfer	
22 August 2026	DF	(Spain)	Miguel Rubio	(Spain) Valladolid	Free transfer	
1 September 2026	DF	(Spain)	Rubén Sánchez	(Spain) Elche	Transfer	

== Competitions ==
=== La Liga ===
==== League table ====
Pos	Team	Pld	W	D	L	GF	GA	GD	Pts
8	Alavés	13	4	4	5	18	18	0	16
9	Villarreal	12	4	3	5	17	15	+2	15
10	Espanyol	13	4	3	6	14	14	0	15
11	Deportivo A Coruña	13	3	6	4	16	17	−1	15
12	Racing Santander	12	4	2	6	17	30	−13	14

Updated to match(es) played on 21 November 2026. Source: LaLiga EA Sports
Rules for classification: 1) Points; 2) Head-to-head points; 3) Head-to-head goal difference; 4) Goal difference; 5) Goals scored; 6) Fair-play points (if three or more teams tied); 7) Play-off at neutral site.
(Note: Head-to-head record is used only after all the matches between the teams in question have been played)

==== Matches ====
16 August 2026 1	Espanyol	3–0	Levante	Cornellà de Llobregat
19:00	R. Fernández 5', 40'; González (yellow card) 37'; Calatrava (yellow card) 63'; Hernández (yellow card) 68'; Dolan 80'	Report		Stadium: RCDE Stadium; Attendance: 28,050; Referee: Carlos Muñiz Muñoz

22 August 2026 2	Espanyol	1–2	Real Madrid	Cornellà de Llobregat
21:30 UTC+2	Calatrava 30', (yellow card) 32'; Riedel (yellow card) 59'; Expósito (yellow card) 84'; Milla (yellow card) 90+1'; Lozano (yellow card) 90+4'	Report	Bellingham 9'; Vinícius (yellow card) 32'; Espí 90'	Stadium: RCDE Stadium; Attendance: 33,304; Referee: José María Sánchez Martínez

29 August 2026 3	Real Sociedad	2–1	Espanyol	San Sebastián
19:00 CEST (UTC+2)	Barrenetxea 4'; Turrientes (yellow card) 17'; Óskarsson 61'; Zubeldia (yellow card) 90+3'	Report	González (yellow card) 21'; R. Fernández 45'; M. Fernández (yellow card) 75'; Hinojo (yellow card) 82'; Bauzà (yellow card) 88'	Stadium: Anoeta; Attendance: 31,884; Referee: Manuel Jesús Orellana Cid

6 September 2026 4	Espanyol	1–1	Sevilla	Cornellà de Llobregat
21:00 CEST (UTC+2)	Calatrava (yellow card) 14'; Moscardo (yellow card) 46'; M. Fernández 90+8'	Report	Kochorashvili (yellow card) 2'; Ure (yellow card) 27'; Sierra (yellow card) 40'; Sangante (red card) 56'; Stassin 85'	Stadium: RCDE Stadium; Attendance: 30,475; Referee: Miguel Sesma Espinosa

12 September 2026 5	Osasuna	0–2	Espanyol	Pamplona
16:15 CEST (UTC+2)	Barja (yellow card) 30'; Moncoyola (yellow card) 39'	Report	R. Fernández 3', 17'; Riedel (yellow card) 40'; El Hilali (yellow card) 45'; Hinojo (yellow card) 87'	Stadium: El Sadar; Attendance: 19,302; Referee: Luis Bestard Servera

15 September 2026 6	Rayo Vallecano	2–1	Espanyol	Puente de Vallecas
19:00 CEST (UTC+2)	García 3'; Pedrosa 26'; López (yellow card) 45+2'; Tsitaishvili (yellow card) 67'; Ciss (yellow card) 70'; Bouare (yellow card) 80'; Alemão (yellow card) 90+1'	Report	R. Fernández 54'; M. Fernández (yellow card) 63'; El Hilali (red card) 90+8'	Stadium: Vallecas Stadium; Attendance: 3,742; Referee: Isidro Díaz de Mera

18 September 2026 7	Espanyol	1–3	Elche CF	Cornellà de Llobregat
21:00 CEST (UTC+2)	Expósito (yellow card) 45+4'; Chust 72' (o.g.); Riedel (yellow card) 82'	Report	Redondo (yellow card) 6' (red card); Niño (yellow card) 22', (goal) 26', 29'; Valera 78'; Cepeda (yellow card) 90+1'	Stadium: RCDE Stadium; Attendance: 26,616; Referee: Jon González Esteban

9 October 2026 8	Málaga CF	1–1	Espanyol	Málaga
21:00 CEST (UTC+2)	Puga (yellow card) 28'; Chupete (yellow card) 41'; Dotor (yellow card) 66'; Aznou (yellow card) 89'; Niño 90+3'		Zaragoza 13', (yellow card) 28'; Hernández (yellow card) 24'; El Hilali (yellow card) 60'; Riedel (yellow card) 84'; Hinojo (yellow card) 87'	Stadium: Estadio La Rosaleda; Attendance: 28,167; Referee: Francisco José Hernández Maeso

17 October 2026 9	Espanyol	0–1	Atlético Madrid	Cornellà de Llobregat
14:00 CEST (UTC+2)	Hinojo (yellow card) 81'; Nuñez (yellow card) 87'	Report	Hjulmand (yellow card) 22'; Lee Kang-in (yellow card) 43'; Romero (yellow card) 66'; Baena (yellow card) 68', (goal) 89'; Mendoza (yellow card) 79'	Stadium: RCDE Stadium; Attendance: 30,882; Referee: Alejandro Hernández Hernández

24 October 2026 10	Racing de Santander	2–1	Espanyol	Santander
16:15 CEST (UTC+2)	Vicente (yellow card) 8'; Ramón (yellow card) 67'; Belocian 69'; Zabiri 84'; Salinas (yellow card) 90+7'	Report	Lozano (yellow card) 17'; Expósito 62', (yellow card) 90'; Fortuño (yellow card) 69'; González (yellow card) 70'; Puado (yellow card) 89'	Stadium: Campos de Sport de El Sardinero; Attendance: 21,437; Referee: Jesús Gil Manzano

30 October 2026 11	Villarreal	0–1	Espanyol	Villarreal
21:00 CET (UTC+1)	Cardona (yellow card) 53'; Comesaña (yellow card) 56'; Maciá (yellow card) 90+1'		Bauzà (yellow card) 21'; Hinojo (yellow card) 41'; Cabrera 60'; Zaragoza (yellow card) 75'	Stadium: Estadio de la Cerámica; Attendance: 17,486; Referee: José María Sánchez Martínez

7 November 2026 12	Espanyol	0–0	Deportivo A Coruña	Cornellà de Llobregat
15:15 CET (UTC+1)	R. Fernández (yellow card) 44'; Cabrera (yellow card) 73'; Santiago (yellow card) 77'; Moscardo (yellow card) 89'	Report	Cruz (yellow card) 39'; Villares (yellow card) 82'; Amatucci (yellow card) 83'; Aubameyang (yellow card) 89'	Stadium: RCDE Stadium; Attendance: 31,030; Referee: Alejandro Quintero González

20 November 2026 13	Athletic Bilbao	0–1	Espanyol	Bilbao
21:00 CET (UTC+1)	Williams (yellow card) 58'; de Galarreta (yellow card) 70'; Álvarez (yellow card) 83'	Report	R. Fernández 66'; Riedel (yellow card) 90+3'	Stadium: San Mamés; Attendance: 46,107; Referee: Mateo Busquets Ferrer

29 November 2026 14	Espanyol	v	Getafe

6 December 2026 15	Deportivo Alavés	v	Espanyol

13 December 2026 16	Espanyol	v	RC Celta de Vigo

20 December 2026 17	Valencia CF	v	Espanyol

3 January 2027 18	Espanyol	v	FC Barcelona

10 January 2027 19	Espanyol	v	Real Betis

17 January 2027 20	Levante UD	v	Espanyol

24 January 2027 21	Espanyol	v	Villarreal CF

31 January 2027 22	Atlético Madrid	v	Espanyol

7 February 2027 23	Espanyol	v	Rayo Vallecano

14 February 2027 24	Sevilla FC	v	Espanyol

21 February 2027 25	Espanyol	v	CA Osasuna

28 February 2027 26	RC Celta de Vigo	v	Espanyol

7 March 2027 27	Espanyol	v	Racing de Santander

14 March 2027 28	Real Madrid CF	v	Espanyol

21 March 2027 29	Espanyol	v	Athletic Bilbao

4 April 2027 30	Getafe CF	v	Espanyol

11 April 2027 31	Espanyol	v	Málaga CF

18 April 2027 32	FC Barcelona	v	Espanyol

21 April 2027 33	Espanyol	v	Real Sociedad

2 May 2027 34	Elche CF	v	Espanyol

9 May 2027 35	Real Betis	v	Espanyol

16 May 2027 36	Espanyol	v	Valencia CF

23 May 2027 37	Deportivo de A Coruña	v	Espanyol

30 May 2027 38	Espanyol	v	Deportivo Alavés

=== Copa del Rey ===
27 October 2026	Sestao River	4–3 (a.e.t.)	Espanyol	Sestao
19:00	Carrión 18'; Ugarte 40'; Laka 98'; Rojo 120+1'	Report	M. Fernández 6' (pen.); R. Fernández 90' (pen.); Moscardo 96'	Stadium: Las Llanas
