= 2025–26 RCD Espanyol season =

RCD Espanyol
2025–26 season
- President: Chen Yansheng (until 14 October); Alan Pace (from 9 October)
- Head coach: Manolo González
- Stadium: RCDE Stadium
- La Liga: 11th
- Copa del Rey: Second round
- Top goalscorer: League: Kike García (8); All: Kike García (10)
Home colours	Away colours	Third colours

The 2025–26 season was the 126th season in the history of RCD Espanyol, and the club's second consecutive season in La Liga. In addition to the domestic league, the club participated in the Copa del Rey.

== Summary ==
On 17 May 2026, after a 2–1 win over Osasuna, Espanyol avoided relegation.

== Players ==
=== First-team squad ===
As of 2 February 2026

Note: Flags indicate national team as defined under FIFA eligibility rules; some limited exceptions apply. Players may hold more than one non-FIFA nationality.

No.	Pos.	Nation	Player
1	GK	ESP	Ángel Fortuño
2	DF	ESP	Rubén Sánchez
4	MF	ESP	Urko González de Zárate
5	DF	ESP	Fernando Calero
6	DF	URU	Leandro Cabrera (captain)
7	FW	ESP	Javi Puado (vice-captain)
8	MF	ESP	Edu Expósito
9	FW	ESP	Roberto Fernández
10	MF	ESP	Pol Lozano (3rd captain)
11	FW	ESP	Pere Milla
12	DF	ESP	José Salinas
13	GK	SRB	Marko Dmitrović

No.	Pos.	Nation	Player
14	MF	ESP	Ramon Terrats (on loan from Villarreal)
15	DF	ESP	Miguel Rubio
16	FW	BEL	Cyril Ngonge (on loan from Napoli)
17	FW	ESP	Jofre Carreras
18	MF	COD	Charles Pickel
19	FW	ESP	Kike García
20	MF	ESP	Antoniu Roca
22	DF	ESP	Carlos Romero (on loan from Villarreal)
23	DF	MAR	Omar El Hilali
24	FW	ENG	Tyrhys Dolan
38	DF	GER	Clemens Riedel

=== Reserve team ===
Note: Flags indicate national team as defined under FIFA eligibility rules; some limited exceptions apply. Players may hold more than one non-FIFA nationality.

No.	Pos.	Nation	Player
26	DF	ESP	José Ángel López
28	MF	ESP	Ferrán Gómez

No.	Pos.	Nation	Player
30	GK	ESP	Pol Tristán
31	GK	ESP	Llorenç Serred

=== Out on loan ===
Note: Flags indicate national team as defined under FIFA eligibility rules; some limited exceptions apply. Players may hold more than one non-FIFA nationality.

No.	Pos.	Nation	Player
—	DF	ESP	Hugo Pérez (at Huesca until 30 June 2026)
—	DF	ESP	Roger Hinojo (at Cultural Leonesa until 30 June 2026)
—	DF	ESP	Pablo Ramón (at Racing Santander until 30 June 2026)
—	MF	ESP	José Gragera (at Deportivo La Coruña until 30 June 2026)

No.	Pos.	Nation	Player
—	MF	CAN	Justin Smith (at Sporting Gijón until 30 June 2026)
—	MF	ESP	Rafel Bauzà (at Mirandés until 30 June 2026)
—	FW	MAR	Omar Sadik (at Pau until 30 June 2026)
—	FW	ESP	Marcos Fernández (at Ceuta until 30 June 2026)

== Transfers ==
=== In ===
Pos.	Player	From	Type	Date	Source
GK	(Serbia) Marko Dmitrović	(Spain) Leganés	Transfer	19 June 2025	
DF	(Spain) José Salinas	(Spain) Elche	Transfer	25 June 2025	
FW	(Spain) Roberto Fernández	(Portugal) Braga	Transfer	27 June 2025	
DF	(Spain) Urko González de Zárate	(Spain) Real Sociedad	Transfer	28 August 2025	

=== Out ===
Pos.	Player	To	Type	Date	Source
GK	(Spain) Joan Garcia	(Spain) Barcelona	Transfer	19 June 2025	

== Competitions ==
=== La Liga ===
==== League table ====
Pos	Team	Pld	W	D	L	GF	GA	GD	Pts	Qualification or relegation
9	Valencia	38	13	10	15	46	55	−9	49	
10	Real Sociedad	38	11	13	14	59	61	−2	46 (Note: Tied on head-to-head points and goal difference. Real Sociedad placed ahead of Espanyol on overall goal difference.)	Qualification for the Europa League league phase (Note: Real Sociedad qualified for the Europa League league phase as the 2025–26 Copa del Rey winners.)
11	Espanyol	38	12	10	16	43	55	−12	46	
12	Athletic Bilbao	38	13	6	19	43	58	−15	45	
13	Sevilla	38	12	7	19	46	60	−14	43 (Note: Head-to-head points: Sevilla 6, Alavés 5, Elche 3.)	

Source: LaLiga EA Sports
Rules for classification: 1) Points; 2) Head-to-head points; 3) Head-to-head goal difference; 4) Goal difference; 5) Goals scored; 6) Fair-play points
(Note: Head-to-head record is used only after all the matches between the teams in question have been played)

==== Matches ====
The league schedule was released on 1 July 2025.

17 August 2025 1	Espanyol	2–1	Atlético Madrid	Cornellà de Llobregat
21:30 CEST (UTC+2)	Calero (yellow card) 54'; Rubio 73'; El Hilali (yellow card) 74'; Milla 84'; Salinas (yellow card) 90+3'	Report	Alvarez 37'; Cardoso (yellow card) 42'; Le Normand (yellow card) 67'; Llorente (yellow card) 72'	Stadium: RCDE Stadium; Attendance: 29,612; Referee: Mateo Busquets Ferrer

24 August 2025 2	Real Sociedad	2–2	Espanyol	San Sebastián
19:30 CEST (UTC+2)	Barrene 61'; Óskarsson 69'; Gorrotxategi (yellow card) 75'; Martín (yellow card) 79'	Report	Milla 10'; Expósito (yellow card) 44'; Puado 46' (pen.); Calero (yellow card) 90+5'	Stadium: Reale Arena; Attendance: 31,616; Referee: Alejandro Quintero González

31 August 2025 3	Espanyol	1–0	Osasuna	Cornellà de Llobregat
19:30 CEST (UTC+2)	Expósito (yellow card) 24'; Romero 52'; Puado (yellow card) 84'	Report	Muñoz (yellow card) 59'; Benito (yellow card) 87'; Torró (yellow card) 90+4'	Stadium: RCDE Stadium; Attendance: 29,780; Referee: Miguel Sesma Espinosa

15 September 2025 4	Espanyol	3–2	Mallorca	Cornellà de Llobregat
19:30 CEST (UTC+2)	Milla 20', (red card) 45+3'; Fernández 34'; Lozano (yellow card) 44'; García 81' (pen.), (yellow card) 89'	Report	Muriqi 45' (pen.), 65'; Morey (yellow card) 45+2'	Stadium: RCDE Stadium; Attendance: 26,082; Referee: Alejandro Hernández Hernández

20 September 2025 5	Real Madrid	2–0	Espanyol	Madrid
16:15 UTC+2	Militão 22'; Tchouaméni (yellow card) 37'; Mbappé 47'; Mastantuono (yellow card) 75'	Report		Stadium: Bernabéu; Attendance: 73,466; Referee: Juan Martínez Munuera

23 September 2025 6	Espanyol	2–2	Valencia	Cornellà de Llobregat
19:00 UTC+2	Pickel (yellow card) 38'; Cabrera 59'; Puado 96'	Report	Danjuma 15'; Diakhaby (yellow card) 38'; López (yellow card) 43'; Santamaria (yellow card) 54'; Duro 62'; Agirrezabala (yellow card) 90+4'	Stadium: RCDE Stadium; Attendance: 26,802; Referee: José Luis Guzmán Mansilla

26 September 2025 7	Girona	0–0	Espanyol	Girona
21:00 UTC+2		Report	El Hilali (yellow card) 35'	Stadium: Montilivi; Attendance: 11,488; Referee: Francisco José Hernández Maeso

5 October 2025 8	Espanyol	1–2	Real Betis	Cornellà de Llobregat
18:30 UTC+2	Lozano 15'; Milla (yellow card) 27'; Puado (yellow card) 45', (penalty missed) 90+13'	Report	Fornals (yellow card) 33'; Antony (yellow card) 45'; Hernández 54'; Ezzalzouli 63'; Lo Celso (yellow card) 90+10'; López (yellow card) 90+11'; Gómez (yellow card) 90+11'; Ávila (yellow card) 90+11'	Stadium: RCDE Stadium; Attendance: 32,778; Referee: Iosu Galech Apezteguía

17 October 2025 9	Oviedo	0–2	Espanyol	Oviedo
21:00 UTC+2	Colombatto (yellow card) 39'; Reina (yellow card) 58'	Report	Milla (yellow card) 27', (goal) 82'; García 70'	Stadium: Carlos Tartiere; Attendance: 25,625; Referee: Mateo Busquets Ferrer

25 October 2025 10	Espanyol	1–0	Elche	Cornellà de Llobregat
16:15 UTC+2	Riedel (yellow card) 11'; Romero 47'; Lozano (yellow card) 64'; Milla (yellow card) 79'; Cabrera (yellow card) 88'	Report	Mir (yellow card) 39'; Núñez (yellow card) 90+1'	Stadium: RCDE Stadium; Attendance: 30,820; Referee: Ricardo de Burgos Bengoetxea

2 November 2025 11	Alavés	2–1	Espanyol	Vitoria-Gasteiz
16:15 UTC+2	Suárez 5', (yellow card) 67'; Boyé (yellow card) 30' (yellow-red card) 90+1', (goal) 40'; Parada (yellow card) 90+3'	Report	Fernández 56'; El Hilali (yellow card) 86'; Dolan (yellow card) 87	Stadium: Mendizorroza; Attendance: 17,149; Referee: Guillermo Cuadra Fernández

8 November 2025 12	Espanyol	0–2	Villarreal	Cornellà de Llobregat
21:00 UTC+2		Report	Gerard 43'; Moleiro 57'; Buchanan (yellow card) 61'; Navarro (yellow card) 81'	Stadium: RCDE Stadium; Attendance: 29,540; Referee: Alejandro Hernández Hernández

24 November 2025 13	Espanyol	2–1	Sevilla	Cornellà de Llobregat
21:00 CET (UTC+1)	Pere Milla 48', (yellow card) 71'; Expósito (yellow card) 50'; Roberto 84', (yellow card) 85'; Lozano (yellow card) 90+7'	Report	Marcão 86'; Castrín (yellow card) 90+4'	Stadium: RCDE Stadium; Attendance: 25,166; Referee: Miguel Sesma Espinosa

30 November 2025 14	Celta Vigo	0–1	Espanyol	Vigo
18:30 UTC+2	Jutglà (yellow card) 90+5'	Report	González de Zárate (yellow card) 72'; García 86'; Romero (yellow card) 90'	Stadium: Balaídos; Attendance: 20,031; Referee: Isidro Díaz de Mera Escuderos

7 December 2025 15	Espanyol	1–0	Rayo Vallecano	Cornellà de Llobregat
18:30 UTC+2	Lozano (yellow card) 31'; Roberto 39' (pen.); González de Zárate (yellow card) 76'; Dolan (yellow card) 77' (yellow-red card) 87'	Report	López (yellow card) 16' (yellow-red card) 64'; Mendy (yellow card) 42'; Gumbau (yellow card) 50'; Chavarría (yellow card) 73'; Batalla (yellow card) 87'; Balliu (yellow card) 90+6'	Stadium: RCDE Stadium; Attendance: 28,110; Referee: José María Sánchez Martínez

13 December 2025 16	Getafe	0–1	Espanyol	Getafe
18:30 UTC+2	Femenía (yellow card) 21'; Duarte (yellow card) 33'; Djené (yellow card) 43'; Sancris (yellow card) 51'; Kamara (yellow card) 85'	Report	El Hilali (yellow card) 28'; Cabrera 53'	Stadium: Coliseum; Attendance: 7,443; Referee: Jesús Gil Manzano

22 December 2025 17	Athletic Bilbao	1–2	Espanyol	Bilbao
21:00 UTC+2	Ruiz de Galarreta (yellow card) 28'; N. Williams (yellow card) 33'; Berenguer 35'; Gorosabel (yellow card) 45+1'; Rego (yellow card) 80'	Report	Romero 44'; Milla 52'; González de Zárate (yellow card) 77'; Riedel (yellow card) 86'	Stadium: San Mamés; Attendance: 47,856; Referee: Mateo Busquets Ferrer

3 January 2026 18	Espanyol	0–2	Barcelona	Cornellà de Llobregat
21:00 CET (UTC+1)	Lozano (yellow card) 77'	Report	Olmo 86'; Lewandowski 90'	Stadium: RCDE Stadium; Attendance: 36,283; Referee: Victor García Verdura

11 January 2026 19	Levante	1–1	Espanyol	Manises
	Losada 55'	Report	García (yellow card) 45+1'; Romero 53'	Stadium: Estadi Ciutat de València; Attendance: 20,501; Referee: César Soto Grado

16 January 2026 20	Espanyol	0–2	Girona	Cornellà de Llobregat
	El Hilali (yellow card) 45'; Sánchez (yellow card) 76'; Carreras (yellow card) 81'; Roca (yellow card) 82'; Romero (yellow card) 89'	Report	Martínez (yellow card) 31'; Vanat 45+3' (pen.), 90+3' (pen.), (yellow card) 89'; Roca (yellow card) 69'; Gazzaniga (yellow card) 76'; Moreno (yellow card) 87'	Stadium: RCDE Stadium; Attendance: 28,451; Referee: Iosu Galech Apezteguía

24 January 2026 21	Valencia	3–2	Espanyol	Valencia
22.15	Duro 15'; Cömert 59'; Vázquez (yellow card) 63'; Ramazan 90+4' (pen.)	Report	Lozano (yellow card) 45+1'; Terrats 54'; García (yellow card) 56'; Calero (yellow card) 67'; Copete 79' (o.g.); Sánchez (yellow card) 90+3'; Dolan (yellow card) 90+8'	Stadium: Mestalla; Attendance: 44,162; Referee: Alejandro Hernández Hernández

1 February 2026 22	Espanyol	1–2	Alavés	Cornellà de Llobregat
21:00	Fernández 15'	Report	Blanco 27'; Parada (yellow card) 40'; Boyé 71'	Stadium: RCDE Stadium; Attendance: 25,881; Referee: Miguel Sesma Espinosa

9 February 2026 23	Villarreal	4–1	Espanyol	Villarreal
21:00	Buchanan (yellow card) 16'; Mikautadze 35'; Salinas 41' (o.g.); Pépé 50'; Moleiro 55'; Gueye (yellow card) 70'; Cardona (yellow card) 89'	Report	Salinas (yellow card) 6'; Expósito (yellow card) 53'; Riedel (yellow card) 57'; Cabrera 88'	Stadium: Estadio de la Cerámica; Attendance: 16,825; Referee: Adrián Cordero Vega

14 February 2026 24	Espanyol	2–2	Celta Vigo	Cornellà de Llobregat
	García 66'; Dolan 86'; Cabrera (yellow card) 90+4'	Report	Jutglà 38'; Iglesias 90+3'	Stadium: RCDE Stadium; Attendance: 27,368; Referee: Guillermo Cuadra Fernández

21 February 2026 25	Atlético Madrid	4–2	Espanyol	Madrid
21:00 CET (UTC+1)	Sørloth 21', 72'; Simeone 49'; Lookman 58'	Report	Carreras 6'; Expósito 80'; Ngonge (yellow card) 83'	Stadium: Riyadh Air Metropolitano; Attendance: 56,412; Referee: Alejandro Muñiz Ruiz

1 March 2026 26	Elche	2–2	Espanyol
	Aguado 42'; Mir 90' (pen.)	Report	García 7'; Romero 57'	Attendance: 25,028; Referee: Iosu Galech Apezteguía

9 March 2026 27	Espanyol	1–1	Oviedo	Cornellà de Llobregat
	García 36'	Report	Reina 8'	Stadium: RCDE Stadium; Attendance: 24,807; Referee: Javier Alberola Rojas

15 March 2026 28	Mallorca	2–1	Espanyol	Palma
	Torre 65'; Castillejo 88'	Report	Pickel 36', (red card) 54'	Stadium: Estadi Mallorca Son Moix; Attendance: 17,879; Referee: Ricardo de Burgos Bengoetxea

22 March 2026 29	Espanyol	1–2	Getafe	Cornellà de Llobregat
	Fernández 68'	Report	Duarte 48'; Arambarri 52'	Stadium: RCDE Stadium; Attendance: 27,577; Referee: Isidro Díaz de Mera Escuderos

5 April 2026 30	Real Betis	0–0	Espanyol	Seville
		Report		Stadium: La Cartuja; Attendance: 54,444; Referee: Guillermo Cuadra Fernández

11 April 2026 31	Barcelona	4–1	Espanyol	Barcelona
18:30 CEST (UTC+2)	Torres 9', 25'; Gavi (yellow card) 32'; Garcia (yellow card) 45+2'; Casadó (yellow card) 49'; Yamal 87'; Rashford 89'	Report	El Hilali (yellow card) 32'; Expósito (yellow card) 34'; Ngonge (yellow card) 44'; Lozano 56', (yellow card) 58'; Calero (yellow card) 83'; González de Zárate (yellow card) 90+2'	Stadium: Camp Nou; Attendance: 60,736; Referee: Alejandro Hernández Hernández

23 April 2026 32	Rayo Vallecano	1–0	Espanyol	Madrid
	Camello 87'	Report		Stadium: Vallecas; Attendance: 11,605; Referee: Adrián Cordero Vega

27 April 2026 33	Espanyol	0–0	Levante	Cornellà de Llobregat
		Report		Stadium: RCDE Stadium

3 May 2026 34	Espanyol	0–2	Real Madrid	Cornellà de Llobregat
21:00 UTC+2		Report	Vinícius 55', 66'	Stadium: RCDE Stadium; Attendance: 31,733; Referee: Jesús Gil Manzano

9 May 2026 35	Sevilla	2–1	Espanyol	Seville
16:15 CEST (UTC+2)	Carmona (yellow card) 61'; Vargas (yellow card) 73'; Sow (yellow card) 73'; Castrín 82', (yellow card) 90+9'; Adams 90+1', (yellow card) 90+2'	Report	González de Zárate (yellow card) 26'; Dolan 56', (yellow card) 73'; El Hilali (yellow card) 90+1'; Calero (yellow card) 90+9'; Pickel (yellow card) 90+11'	Stadium: Ramón Sánchez-Pizjuán; Attendance: 39,085; Referee: Javier Alberola Rojas

13 May 2026 36	Espanyol	2–0	Athletic Bilbao	Cornellà de Llobregat
	Milla 69'; García 90+2'	Report		Stadium: RCDE Stadium; Attendance: 29,943; Referee: Francisco Hernández Maeso

17 May 2026 37	Osasuna	1–2	Espanyol	Pamplona
	Muñoz 49'	Report	Romero 27'; García 53'	Stadium: El Sadar; Referee: Miguel Ortiz Arias

23 May 2026 38	Espanyol	1–1	Real Sociedad	Cornellà de Llobregat
	Fernández 65'	Report	Óskarsson 28'	Stadium: RCDE Stadium; Attendance: 28,012; Referee: José Luis Munuera Montero

=== Copa del Rey ===
30 October 2025 First round	Atlètic Lleida	1–2	Espanyol	Lleida
21:00		Report		Stadium: Camp d'Esports

4 December 2025 Second round	Atlético Baleares	1–0	Espanyol	Palma
19:00	Tovar 54'	Report		Stadium: Estadi Balear; Referee: Alejandro Quintero González
