= 2024–25 RCD Espanyol season =

RCD Espanyol
2024–25 season
- President: Chen Yansheng
- Head coach: Manolo González
- Stadium: RCDE Stadium
- La Liga: 14th
- Copa del Rey: Second round
- Top goalscorer: League: Javi Puado (12); All: Javi Puado (12)
- Average home league attendance: 25,640
Home colours	Away colours	Third colours

The 2024–25 season was the 125th season in the history of RCD Espanyol, and the club's first season back in La Liga following promotion from the Segunda División. In addition to the domestic league, the club participated in the Copa del Rey.

== Players ==
=== First-team squad ===
As of 3 February 2025

Note: Flags indicate national team as defined under FIFA eligibility rules; some limited exceptions apply. Players may hold more than one non-FIFA nationality.

No.	Pos.	Nation	Player
1	GK	ESP	Joan Garcia
2	FW	ESP	Roberto Fernández (on loan from Braga)
3	DF	ESP	Sergi Gómez (captain)
4	DF	ALB	Marash Kumbulla (on loan from Roma)
5	DF	ESP	Fernando Calero
6	DF	URU	Leandro Cabrera (vice-captain)
7	FW	ESP	Javi Puado (3rd captain)
8	MF	ESP	Edu Expósito
9	FW	ARG	Alejo Véliz (on loan from Tottenham Hotspur)
10	MF	ESP	Pol Lozano (4th captain)
11	FW	ESP	Pere Milla
12	DF	ESP	Álvaro Tejero
13	GK	ESP	Fernando Pacheco

No.	Pos.	Nation	Player
14	DF	ESP	Brian Oliván
15	MF	ESP	José Gragera
16	FW	MAR	Walid Cheddira (on loan from Napoli)
17	FW	ESP	Jofre Carreras
18	MF	ESP	Álvaro Aguado
19	MF	ESP	Urko González de Zárate (on loan from Real Sociedad)
20	MF	CZE	Alex Král (on loan from Union Berlin)
22	DF	ESP	Carlos Romero (on loan from Villarreal)
23	DF	MAR	Omar El Hilali
24	DF	ESP	Pablo Ramón
31	MF	ESP	Antoniu Roca
33	GK	ESP	Ángel Fortuño

=== Reserve team ===
Note: Flags indicate national team as defined under FIFA eligibility rules; some limited exceptions apply. Players may hold more than one non-FIFA nationality.

No.	Pos.	Nation	Player
27	DF	ESP	José Luis Català
32	FW	MAR	Omar Sadik
34	GK	ESP	Llorenç Serred
35	MF	ESP	Rafel Bauzà
38	GK	ESP	Pol Tristán

No.	Pos.	Nation	Player
39	MF	ESP	Alex Almansa
40	MF	CAN	Justin Smith
41	DF	ESP	José Ángel López
42	DF	ESP	Roger Hinojo

=== Out on loan ===
Note: Flags indicate national team as defined under FIFA eligibility rules; some limited exceptions apply. Players may hold more than one non-FIFA nationality.

No.	Pos.	Nation	Player
—	DF	ESP	Rubén Sánchez (at Granada until 30 June 2025)
—	DF	ESP	Ian Forns (at Murcia until 30 June 2025)
—	MF	ESP	Javi Hernández (at Huesca until 30 June 2025)

No.	Pos.	Nation	Player
—	MF	ESP	Roger Martínez (at Lugo until 30 June 2025)
—	FW	URU	Gastón Valles (at Cartagena until 30 June 2025)
—	FW	ESP	Kenneth Soler (at Murcia until 30 June 2025)

== Transfers ==
=== In ===
Pos.	Player	Transferred from	Fee	Date	Source
DF	(Spain) Carlos Romero	Villarreal	Loan	9 July 2024	
DF	(Spain) Álvaro Tejero	Eibar	Free	9 July 2024	
DM	(Czech Republic) Alex Král	(Germany) Union Berlin	Loan	7 August 2024	
ST	(Argentina) Alejo Véliz	(England) Tottenham Hotspur	Loan	7 August 2024	
FW	(France) Irvin Cardona	(Germany) FC Augsburg	Loan	10 August 2024	
CB	(Albania) Marash Kumbulla	(Italy) Roma	Loan	17 August 2024	
FW	(Morocco) Walid Cheddira	(Italy) Napoli	Loan	27 August 2024	
FW	(Turkey) Naci Ünüvar	(Netherlands) Ajax	Loan	29 August 2024	
DF	(Spain) Pablo Ramón	Real Madrid Castilla	Free	3 January 2025	
FW	(Spain) Roberto Fernández	(Portugal) Braga	Loan	14 January 2025	
CDM	(Spain) Urko González de Zárate	Real Sociedad	Loan	23 January 2025	

=== Out ===
Pos.	Player	Transferred to	Fee	Date	Source
MF	(Senegal) Keita Baldé	(Russia) Spartak Moscow	Loan return	30 June 2024	
MF	(Spain) Nico Melamed	Almería	End of contract	1 July 2024	
DF	(Spain) Óscar Gil	(Belgium) OH Leuven	End of contract	1 July 2024	
DF	(Spain) Víctor Ruiz	Retired	End of contract	1 July 2024	
MF	(Albania) Keidi Bare	Zaragoza	End of contract	1 July 2024	
FW	(Spain) Joselu	Real Madrid	€1,500,000	1 July 2024	
FW	(Denmark) Martin Braithwaite	(Brazil) Gremio	Contract terminated	15 July 2024	
RB	(Spain) Rubén Sánchez	Granada	Loan	23 July 2024	
FW	(Sweden) Max Svensson	(Portugal) Casa Pia	End of contract	7 August 2024	
LW	(Spain) José Carlos Lazo	Albacete	Contract terminated	12 August 2024	
MF	(Spain) Javi Hernández	Huesca	Loan	13 August 2024	
FW	(Uruguay) Gastón Valles	Cartagena	Loan	14 August 2024	
LW	(Spain) Kenneth Soler	Murcia	Loan	20 August 2024	
FW	(Turkey) Naci Ünüvar	(Netherlands) Ajax	Loan return	15 January 2025	
RW	(Spain) Salvi	Ceuta	End of contract	23 January 2025	
FW	(France) Irvin Cardona	(Germany) FC Augsburg	Loan return	27 January 2025	

== Friendlies ==
=== Pre-season ===
27 July 2024 Friendly	Espanyol	0–0	Girona	Navata
11:00 CEST (UTC+2)				Stadium: Campo de Torremirona

31 July 2024 Friendly	Espanyol	1–0	Huesca	Sant Adrià de Besòs
19:00				Stadium: Ciutat Esportiva Dani Jarque

4 August 2024 Friendly	Espanyol	0–0	Toulouse	Sant Adrià de Besòs
19:00				Stadium: Ciutat Esportiva Dani Jarque

10 August 2024 Friendly	1. FC Heidenheim	2–1	Espanyol	Heidenheim an der Brenz, Germany
15:30				Stadium: Voith-Arena

==== Copa Catalunya ====
29 January 2025 Quarter-finals	Sabadell	0–1	Espanyol
19:00		Report	Salazar 5'

19 March 2025 Semi-finals	Espanyol	5–0	Barcelona Atlètic
20:45	Mingo 1', 5', 30'; A. López 15'; Almansa 50'

TBD Final	Espanyol	v	Girona

== Competitions ==
=== Overall record ===
Competition	First match	Last match	Starting round	Final position	Record							
Competition	First match	Last match	Starting round	Final position	Pld	W	D	L	GF	GA	GD	Win %
La Liga	19 August 2024	24 May 2025	Matchday 1	14th	38	11	9	18	40	51	−11	28.95
Copa del Rey	31 October 2024	3 December 2024	First round	Second round	2	1	0	1	4	2	+2	50.00
Total					40	12	9	19	44	53	−9	30.00

Source: Soccerway

=== La Liga ===
==== League table ====
Pos	Team	Pld	W	D	L	GF	GA	GD	Pts
12	Valencia	38	11	13	14	44	54	−10	46 (Note: Real Sociedad finished ahead of Valencia on head-to-head goal difference: Real Sociedad 3–0 Valencia, Valencia 1–0 Real Sociedad.)
13	Getafe	38	11	9	18	34	39	−5	42 (Note: Head-to-head points: Getafe 9, Espanyol 9, Alavés 0.)
14	Espanyol	38	11	9	18	40	51	−11	42
15	Alavés	38	10	12	16	38	48	−10	42
16	Girona	38	11	8	19	44	60	−16	41 (Note: Girona finished ahead of Sevilla on head-to-head goal difference: Sevilla 0–2 Girona, Girona 1–2 Sevilla.)

Source: LaLiga EA Sports
Rules for classification: 1) Points; 2) Head-to-head points; 3) Head-to-head goal difference; 4) Goal difference; 5) Goals scored; 6) Fair-play points
(Note: Head-to-head record is used only after all the matches between the teams in question have been played)

==== Results summary ====
Overall								Home						Away					
Pld	W	D	L	GF	GA	GD	Pts	W	D	L	GF	GA	GD	W	D	L	GF	GA	GD
38	11	9	18	40	51	−11	42	8	6	5	23	20	+3	3	3	13	17	31	−14

Source: La Liga

==== Results by round ====
Round	1	2	3	4	5	6	7	8	9	10	11	12	13	14	15	16	17	18	19	20	21	22	23	24	25	27	28	29	30	31	32	33	26^{1}	34	35	36	37	38
Ground	A	H	A	H	H	A	H	A	H	A	H	A	H	A	H	A	H	A	H	H	A	H	A	H	A	H	A	H	A	A	H	A	A	H	A	H	A	H
Result	L	L	D	W	W	L	L	L	W	L	L	L	D	L	W	L	D	L	D	W	D	W	L	D	W	D	L	D	W	W	W	D	L	L	L	L	L	W
Position	20	19	19	15	11	13	14	17	14	15	17	17	18	19	18	17	18	18	18	18	18	17	16	15	15	15	15	16	16	15	13	13	13	14	14	16	17	14

Source: La Liga
A = Away; H = Home; W = Win; D = Draw; L = Loss

^{1} Matchday 26 (vs Villarreal) was postponed due to heavy rain and risk of flooding.

==== Matches ====
The league schedule was released on 18 June 2024.

19 August 2024 1	Valladolid	1–0	Espanyol	Valladolid
19:00	Moro 23'; Rosa (yellow card) 80'; Sánchez (yellow card) 90+7'	Report	Roca (yellow card) 72'; Cardona (yellow card) 87'	Stadium: Estadio José Zorrilla; Attendance: 22,027; Referee: Pablo González Fuertes

24 August 2024 2	Espanyol	0–1	Real Sociedad	Cornellà de Llobregat
21:30	Véliz (yellow card) 52'; Kumbulla (yellow card) 90+7'	Report	Turrientes (yellow card) 51'; Oyarzabal (yellow card) 57'; Kubo 80'	Stadium: Stage Front Stadium; Attendance: 20,900; Referee: Mario Melero López

28 August 2024 3	Atlético Madrid	0–0	Espanyol	Madrid
21:30		Report	Puado (yellow card) 55'; El Hilali (yellow card) 82'	Stadium: Cívitas Metropolitano; Attendance: 56,669; Referee: Ricardo de Burgos Bengoetxea

31 August 2024 4	Espanyol	2–1	Rayo Vallecano	Cornellà de Llobregat
19:15 CEST (UTC+2)	Romero 8'; Kumbulla (yellow card) 81'; Aguado (yellow card) 85'; Véliz 90+6'; Véliz (yellow card) 90+7'	Report	García 4'; García (yellow card) 82'; Mumin (yellow card) 90+3'	Stadium: Stage Front Stadium; Attendance: 22,405; Referee: Adrián Cordero Vega

14 September 2024 5	Espanyol	3–2	Alavés	Cornellà de Llobregat
16:15	Puado 21', 56', 63' (pen.); Kumbulla (yellow card) 48'; El Hilali (yellow card) 54'	Report	Abqar (yellow card) 29'; Conechny 35'; Sivera (yellow card) 61'; Tenaglia 68'; Sánchez (yellow card) 76'; García (yellow card) 90+2'	Stadium: Stage Front Stadium; Attendance: 24,238; Referee: Juan Luis Pulido Santana

21 September 2024 6	Real Madrid	4–1	Espanyol	Madrid
21:00	Carvajal 58'; Rodrygo 75'; Vinicius 78'; Mbappé 90' (pen.)	Report	Courtois 54' (o.g.)	Stadium: Santiago Bernabéu; Attendance: 72,284; Referee: José Luis Munuera Montero

26 September 2024 7	Espanyol	1–2	Villarreal	Cornellà de Llobregat
19:00	Carreras 46'	Report	Pérez 51', 63'	Stadium: Stage Front Stadium; Attendance: 23,147; Referee: Alejandro Quintero González

29 September 2024 8	Real Betis	1–0	Espanyol	Seville
18:30 CEST (UTC+2)	Lo Celso 85'	Report		Stadium: Benito Villamarín; Attendance: 53,065; Referee: Alejandro José Hernández Hernández

5 October 2024 9	Espanyol	2–1	Mallorca	Cornellà de Llobregat
14:00	Kumbulla 18'; Carreras 47'	Report	Raíllo 68'	Stadium: Stage Front Stadium; Attendance: 24,434; Referee: Francisco José Hernández Maeso

19 October 2024 10	Athletic Bilbao	4–1	Espanyol	Bilbao
14:00 CEST (UTC+2)	Vivian 6'; I. Williams 28', 30'; Nuñez (yellow card) 48'; Berchiche (yellow card) 45+3'; Berenguer 55'	Report	Milla (yellow card) 51'; Cabrera (yellow card) 74'; El Hilali (yellow card) 82'; Tejero 90+2'	Stadium: San Mamés; Attendance: 46,713; Referee: Mateo Busquets Ferrer

25 October 2024 11	Espanyol	0–2	Sevilla	Cornellà de Llobregat
21:00	Roca (yellow card) 82'; Lozano (yellow card) 90+1'	Report	Lukebakio 20', 45'	Stadium: Stage Front Stadium; Attendance: 23,656; Referee: Miguel Ángel Ortiz Arias

3 November 2024 12	Barcelona	3–1	Espanyol	Barcelona
16:15	Olmo 12', 31'; Raphinha 23'	Report	Puado 63'	Stadium: Estadi Olímpic Lluís Companys; Attendance: 48,843; Referee: José Luis Munuera Montero

23 November 2024 14	Girona	4–1	Espanyol	Girona
18:30 CET (UTC+1)	Gil 4'; Miovski 16', 21'; Krejčí 27'		Puado 55'	Stadium: Montilivi

30 November 2024 15	Espanyol	3–1	Celta Vigo	Cornellà de Llobregat
18:30 CET (UTC+1)				Stadium: Stage Front Stadium

9 December 2024 16	Getafe	1–0	Espanyol	Getafe
22:00 CET (UTC+1)	Álvaro 8'; Alderete (yellow card) 29'; Arambarri (yellow card) 42'; J.Patrick (yellow card) 83'	Report	Jofre (yellow card) 5'; El Hilali (yellow card) 57'; Cabrera (yellow card) 64'; A.Roca (yellow card) 82'; S.Gómez (yellow card) 90'; B.Oliván (yellow card) 90'	Stadium: Coliseum; Attendance: 7.559; Referee: Mateo Busquets Ferrer

14 December 2024 17	Espanyol	0–0	Osasuna	Cornellà de Llobregat
14:00	Lozano (yellow card) 31'; Tejero (yellow card) 58'; Kumbulla (yellow card) 65'	Report	Catena (yellow card) 36'	Stadium: Stage Front Stadium; Attendance: 20.513; Referee: Adrián Cordero Vega

18 December 2024 13	Espanyol	1–1	Valencia	Cornellà de Llobregat
21:30	Puado 44'; El Hilali (yellow card) 63'	Report	López 47'	Stadium: Stage Front Stadium; Attendance: 18,122; Referee: Pablo González Fuertes

22 December 2024 18	Las Palmas	1–0	Espanyol	Gran Canaria
18:30	Fábio Silva (yellow card) 17'; Marvin Park (yellow card) 30'; Alex Suárez (yellow card) 59'; Ramírez 67'; Loiodice (yellow card) 80'	Report	Javi Puado (yellow card) 18'; Pol Lozano (yellow card) 83'	Stadium: Estadio de Gran Canaria; Attendance: 23.743; Referee: César Soto Grado

11 January 2025 19	Espanyol	1–1	Leganés	Cornellà de Llobregat
17:30	Cabrera 2'; El Hilali (yellow card) 15'; Alex Král (yellow card) 15'	Report	Cissé 14'; Raba (yellow card) 45+1'; Brašanac (yellow card) 71'; Soriano (red card) 90+1'	Stadium: RCDE Stadium; Attendance: 26.606; Referee: Juan Martínez Munuera

19 January 2025 20	Espanyol	2–1	Valladolid	Cornellà de Llobregat
21:00	Javi Puado 31'; El Hilali (yellow card) 45'; Fernández 74'; Oliván (yellow card) 90+1'	Report	Javi Sánchez 57'; Stanko Juric (yellow card) 63'; Amallah (yellow card) 81'	Stadium: RCDE Stadium; Attendance: 23.554; Referee: De Burgos Bengoetxea

25 January 2025 21	Sevilla	1–1	Espanyol	Seville
18:30	Loïc Badé 61'; Juanlu (yellow card) 65'	Report	Kumbulla 15'; R.Fernández (yellow card) 45+5'; Tejero (yellow card) 48'; Pol Lozano (yellow card) 56'; Expósito (yellow card) 79'	Stadium: Ramón Sánchez-Pizjuán; Attendance: 33.602; Referee: Adrián Cordero Vega

1 February 2025 22	Espanyol	1–0	Real Madrid	Cornellà de Llobregat
21:00	Romero (yellow card) 61', (goal) 85'; Kumbulla (yellow card) 90'	Report		Stadium: RCDE Stadium; Attendance: 33.669; Referee: Alejandro Muñiz Ruiz

9 February 2025 23	Real Sociedad	2–1	Espanyol	San Sebastián
18:30 CET (UTC+1)	Becker 1'; Aguerd (yellow card) 51'; Méndez 84'	Report	Aguado (yellow card) 40'; Puado 53' (pen.); Cabrera (yellow card) 90+2'	Stadium: Reale Arena; Attendance: 29,478; Referee: Javier Alberola Rojas

16 February 2025 24	Espanyol	1–1	Athletic Bilbao	Cornellà de Llobregat
14:00 CET (UTC+1)	González de Zárate (yellow card) 46'; Fernández 62'	Report	Yeray (yellow card) 5'; Sancet 77'	Stadium: Stage Front Stadium; Attendance: 26,645; Referee: Guillermo Cuadra Fernández

22 February 2025 25	Alavés	0–1	Espanyol	Vitoria-Gasteiz
13:00 CEST (UTC+2)	Tenaglia (yellow card) 7'; Blanco (yellow card) 65'	Report	Lozano (yellow card) 17'; El Hilali (yellow card) 84'; Calero 86'	Stadium: Mendizorrotza; Attendance: 17.068; Referee: Juan Luis Pulido Santana

10 March 2025 27	Espanyol	1–1	Girona	Cornellà de Llobregat
21:00	Lozano (yellow card) 22'; Puado (yellow card) 45+3'; Expósito (yellow card) 45+3'; Carreras 49'	Report	Krejčí (yellow card) 12'; Gutiérrez (yellow card) 61'; Gil (yellow card) 75'; Stuani 87' (pen.)	Stadium: RCDE Stadium; Attendance: 23.997; Referee: Adrián Cordero Vega

15 March 2025 28	Mallorca	2–1	Espanyol	Palma
15:15 CET (UTC+1)	Muriqi (penalty missed) 62, 90+7' (pen.); Asano 65'; Abdón (penalty missed) 90+1,	Report	Muriqi 53' (o.g.); El Hilali (yellow card) 61'; Aguado (yellow card) 90+10'	Stadium: Estadi Mallorca Son Moix; Attendance: 18.240; Referee: Alejandro Quintero González

29 March 2025 29	Espanyol	1–1	Atlético Madrid	Cornellà de Llobregat
16:15 CEST (UTC+2)	Kumbulla (yellow card) 21'; Puado 71' (pen.); Veliz (yellow card) 73'	Report	Azpilicueta 38'; Giménez (yellow card) 90+1'	Stadium: Stage Front Stadium; Attendance: 30.559; Referee: Javier Alberola Rojas

4 April 2025 30	Rayo Vallecano	0–4	Espanyol	Madrid
21:00 CEST (UTC+2)	Chavarría (yellow card) 28'; Pathé Ciss (yellow card) 70'	Report	Cabrera 12'; Roberto 16'; Lozano (yellow card) 55'; Puado 72' (pen.); Milla (yellow card) 87', (goal) 90'	Stadium: Campo de Fútbol de Vallecas; Attendance: 11.905; Referee: Alejandro José Hernández Hernández

12 April 2025 31	Celta Vigo	0–2	Espanyol	Vigo
18:30	Javi (yellow card) 45+4'; Jailson (yellow card) 65'	Report	Roberto 28', 63'; Lozano (yellow card) 44'; Puado (yellow card) 77'	Stadium: Estadio ABANCA Balaídos; Attendance: 19.801; Referee: Mateo Busquets Ferrer

18 April 2025 32	Espanyol	1–0	Getafe	Cornellà de Llobregat
21:00	Kumbulla 39'	Report	da Costa (yellow card) 14'; Chrisantus (red card) 60'; Arambarri (yellow card) 73'	Stadium: Stage Front Stadium; Attendance: 25.003; Referee: Ricardo De Burgos Bengochea

22 April 2025 33	Valencia	1–1	Espanyol	Valencia
19:00	Almeida (yellow card) 39'; Tárrega (yellow card) 45+2'; Guerra 57'	Report	Romero (yellow card) 31'; Puado 40'	Stadium: Mestalla; Attendance: 42.448; Referee: Juan Pulido Santana

27 April 2025 26	Villarreal	1–0	Espanyol	Villarreal
16:15		Report		Stadium: Estadio de la Cerámica; Referee: José Luis Munuera Montero

4 May 2025 34	Espanyol	1–2	Real Betis	Cornellà de Llobregat

11 May 2025 35	Leganés	3–2	Espanyol	Leganés

15 May 2025 36	Espanyol	0–2	Barcelona	Cornellà de Llobregat

18 May 2025 37	Osasuna	2–0	Espanyol	Pamplona

24 May 2025 38	Espanyol	2–0	Las Palmas	Cornellà de Llobregat

=== Copa del Rey ===
31 October 2024 First round	San Tirso SD	0–4	Espanyol	A Coruña
19:00 UTC+1	Segade (yellow card) 10'; Denis López (yellow card) 55'	Report	Sergi Gómez (yellow card) 24'; Véliz 54', 86', 90+1'; Rafel Bauzà (yellow card) 71'; Cardona 85'	Stadium: Riazor; Attendance: 3.041; Referee: Adrián Cordero Vega

3 December 2024 Second round	UD Barbastro	2–0	Espanyol	Barbastro
21:00 UTC+1	Barrera 55' (pen.), 81'; Bautista (yellow card) 89'	Report	Kumbulla (yellow card) 6'; Véliz (yellow card) 78'	Stadium: Estadio Municipal de Deportes de Barbastro; Referee: Javier Alberola Rojas
