= Jaílson =

Jaílson may refer to:

- Jaílson Araújo (born 1991), Brazilian football right back
- Jailson Severiano Alves (born 1984), Brazilian football midfielder
- Jailson Marcelino dos Santos (born 1981), Brazilian football goalkeeper
- Jaílson França Braz, known as Bia (born 1981), Brazilian football midfielder
- Jailson Siqueira (born 1995), Brazilian football midfielder
- Jaílson Alexandre Alves dos Santos (1981), Brazilian football midfielder
- Jaílson Cardoso de Araújo (born 1987), Brazilian football goalkeeper
- Jailson (footballer, born 1992), Edjailson Nascimento da Silva, Brazilian football attacking midfielder
