= Ángel Fortuño =

Spanish footballer (born 2001)

Personal information
- Full name: Ángel Fortuño Viñas
- Date of birth: 5 October 2001 (age 25)
- Place of birth: Barcelona, Spain
- Height: 1.83 m (6 ft 0 in)
- Position: Goalkeeper

Team information
- Current team: Espanyol
- Number: 1

Youth career
- Júpiter
- 2009–2020: Espanyol

Senior career*
Years	Team	Apps	(Gls)
2020–2024	Espanyol B	76	(0)
2024–	Espanyol	1	(0)

International career^{‡}
2019	Spain U18	2	(0)
2020	Spain U19	2	(0)
2019	Spain U20	3	(0)
2025–	Catalonia	1	(0)
- * Club domestic league appearances and goals as of 21:23, 23 May 2026 (UTC) ‡ National team caps and goals as of 14:22, 19 November 2025 (UTC)

Ángel Fortuño Viñas (born 5 October 2001) is a Spanish professional footballer who plays as a goalkeeper for RCD Espanyol.

== Club career ==
Born in Barcelona, Catalonia, Fortuño joined RCD Espanyol's youth setup in 2009, from CE Júpiter. He was promoted to the reserves in Segunda División B ahead of the 2020–21 season, and renewed his contract until 2024 on 25 September 2020.

Fortuño made his senior debut on 18 October 2020, starting in a 2–1 home win over AE Prat. Initially a backup to Joan García, he became a starter with the B-team after García was promoted to the main squad, and further extended his link until 2027 on 22 September 2023.

Fortuño was promoted to the main squad for the 2024–25 campaign, initially as a third-choice behind García and Fernando Pacheco. He made his first team debut on 30 October 2025, starting in a 2–1 away win over CE Atlètic Lleida, for the season's Copa del Rey.

Fortuño made his professional – and La Liga – debut on 23 May 2026, playing the full 90 minutes in a 1–1 home draw against Real Sociedad. On 6 July, he renewed his contract until 2030.

== International career ==
Fortuño represented Spain at under-18, under-19 and under-20 levels. He first appeared with the Catalonia national team in a friendly 2–1 win over Palestine on 18 November 2025.

== Career statistics ==
=== Club ===
As of match played 23 May 2026

Appearances and goals by club, season and competition
Club	Season	League			Cup		Europe		Other		Total	
Club	Season	Division	Apps	Goals	Apps	Goals	Apps	Goals	Apps	Goals	Apps	Goals
Espanyol B	2019–20	Segunda División B	0	0	—		—		—		0	0
Espanyol B	2020–21	Segunda División B	6	0	—		—		7 (Note: Appearances in promotion playoff)	0	13	0
Espanyol B	2021–22	Segunda Federación	30	0	—		—		1	0	31	0
Espanyol B	2022–23	Segunda Federación	21	0	—		—		2	0	23	0
Espanyol B	2023–24	Segunda Federación	19	0	—		—		—		19	0
Espanyol B	Total		76	0	—		—		10	0	86	0
Espanyol	2020–21	Segunda División	0	0	0	0	—		—		0	0
Espanyol	2022–23	La Liga	0	0	0	0	—		—		0	0
Espanyol	2023–24	Segunda División	0	0	0	0	—		0	0	0	0
Espanyol	2024–25	La Liga	0	0	0	0	—		—		0	0
Espanyol	2025–26	La Liga	1	0	2	0	—		—		3	0
Espanyol	2026–27	La Liga	0	0	0	0	—		—		0	0
Espanyol	Total		1	0	2	0	—		0	0	3	0
Career total			75	0	2	0	0	0	10	0	87	0
