= Quilindschy Hartman =

Dutch footballer (born 2001)

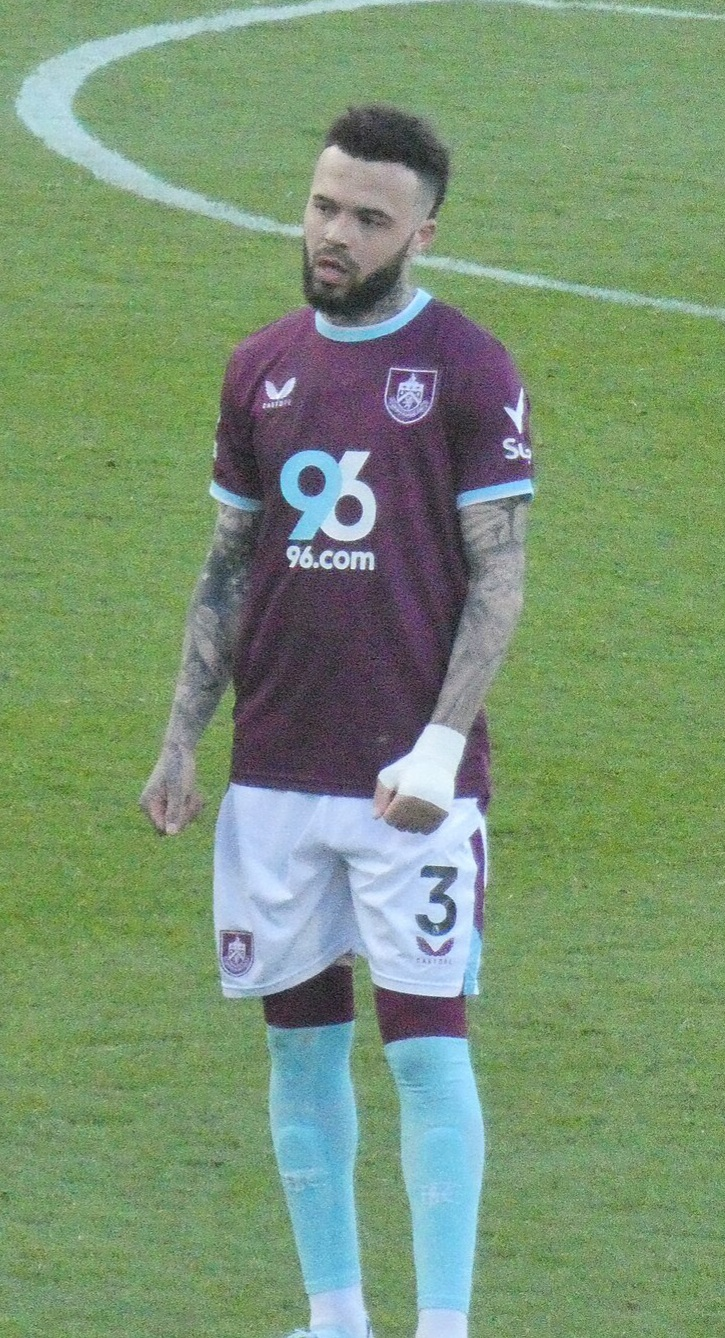
- Hartman playing for Burnley in 2026

Personal information
- Full name: Quilindschy Hartman
- Date of birth: 14 November 2001 (age 24)
- Place of birth: Zwijndrecht, Netherlands
- Height: 1.85 m (6 ft 1 in)
- Position: Left-back

Team information
- Current team: Espanyol (on loan from Burnley)
- Number: 3

Youth career
- –2009: VVGZ
- 2009–2010: Excelsior
- 2010–2022: Feyenoord

Senior career*
Years	Team	Apps	(Gls)
2022–2025	Feyenoord	61	(2)
2025–	Burnley	21	(0)
2026–	→ Espanyol (loan)	6	(0)

International career^{‡}
2023	Netherlands U21	5	(0)
2023–	Netherlands	5	(1)
- * Club domestic league appearances and goals as of 17:54, 9 November 2026 (UTC) ‡ National team caps and goals as of 14:02, 10 October 2025 (UTC)

Quilindschy Hartman (born 14 November 2001) is a Dutch professional footballer who plays as a left-back for La Liga club Espanyol, on loan from EFL Championship club Burnley, and the Netherlands national team.

== Club career ==
=== Feyenoord ===
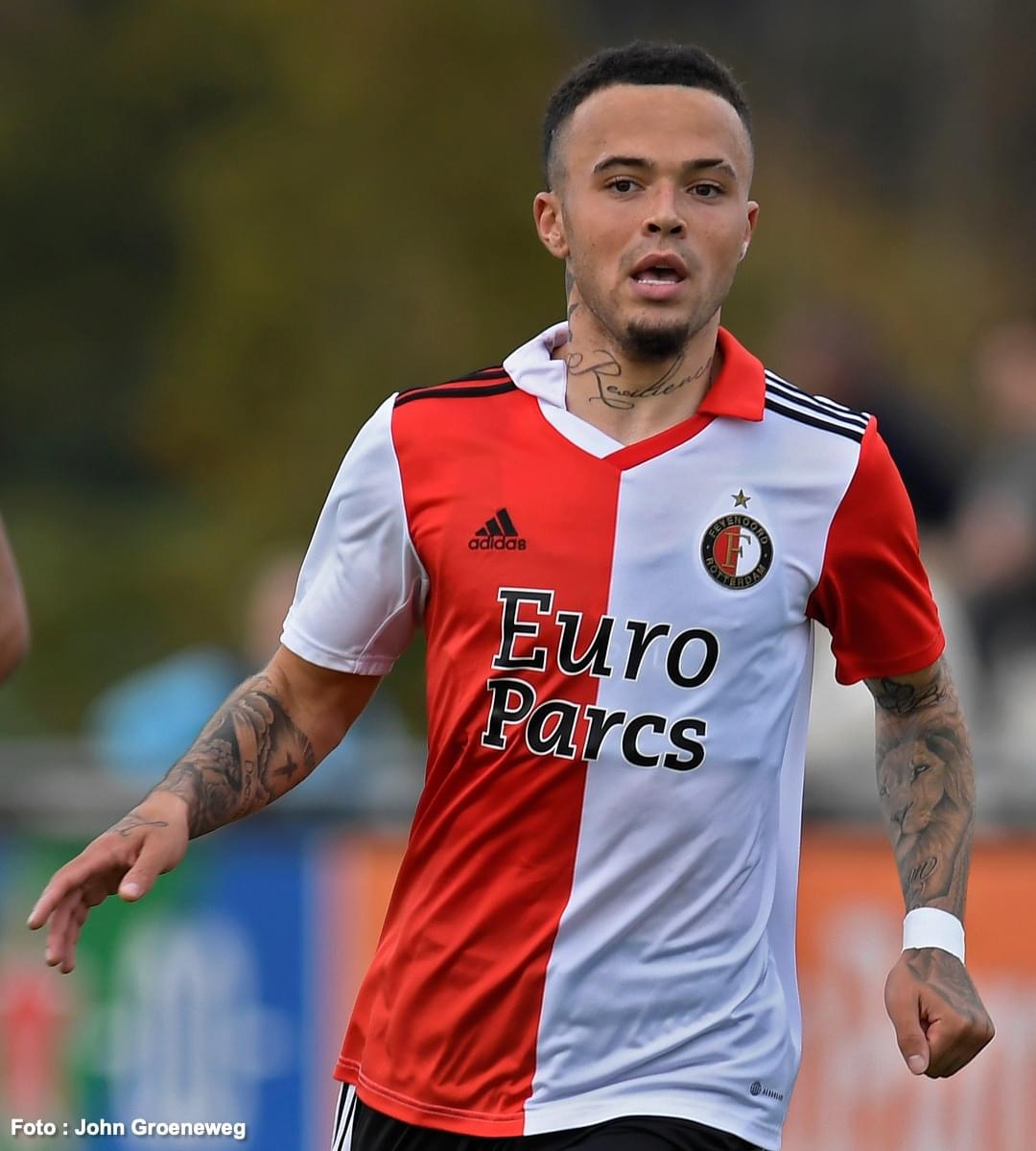
Hartman playing for Feyenoord in 2023

On 19 June 2020, Hartman signed his first professional contract at Feyenoord, where he was an academy player since moving from Excelsior in 2010. He made his debut for the club on 21 August 2022, starting away against RKC Waalwijk in a 1–0 win. On 8 September 2022, Hartman made his European debut as a starter in a 4–2 away defeat to Lazio in the UEFA Europa League. Hartman scored his first goal for the club on 10 November 2022, scoring Feyenoord's first and only goal in a 1–0 win against Cambuur. Four days later, Feyenoord announced that the club and Hartman had reached an agreement for the player to extend his contract with two years until 2025. On 17 November 2022, Hartman signed his new contract. Hartman received praise for his performance in De Klassieker on 22 January 2023, with Wesley Sneijder calling Hartman the man of the match. On 25 January 2023, Hartman's squad number was changed from 19 to 5. Hartman became a regular starter of a Feyenoord side that secured the club's first Eredivisie title in six years with a 3–0 win against Go Ahead Eagles on 14 March 2023.

On 4 August 2023, Hartman was a starter as Feyenoord lost the Johan Cruyff Shield 0–1 to PSV. On 29 August 2023, he once again extended his contract, with him signing a new contract until 2026. Hartman made his UEFA Champions League debut in a 2–0 win against Celtic on 19 September 2023. He scored with his effort in a penalty shoot-out Feyenoord lost against Roma in the knock-out play-off round of the UEFA Europa League on 22 February 2024. On 31 March 2024, he sustained a knee injury during a 4–2 win over Utrecht, which sidelined him for the remainder of the season, including the KNVB Cup final, in which Feyenoord beat NEC 1–0.

After ten months of injury, Hartman returned to the pitch as a substitute for Hugo Bueno in a 2–1 defeat against rivals Ajax on 2 February 2025. After his injury, he was not included in Feyenoord's squad for the UEFA Champions League knockout phase. In an interview in August 2025, Hartman stated that he left Feyenoord due to troubles with head coach Robin van Persie after he did not want to extend his contract. Van Persie responded that Hartman did not have the expected attitude and intensity during the training sessions.

=== Burnley ===
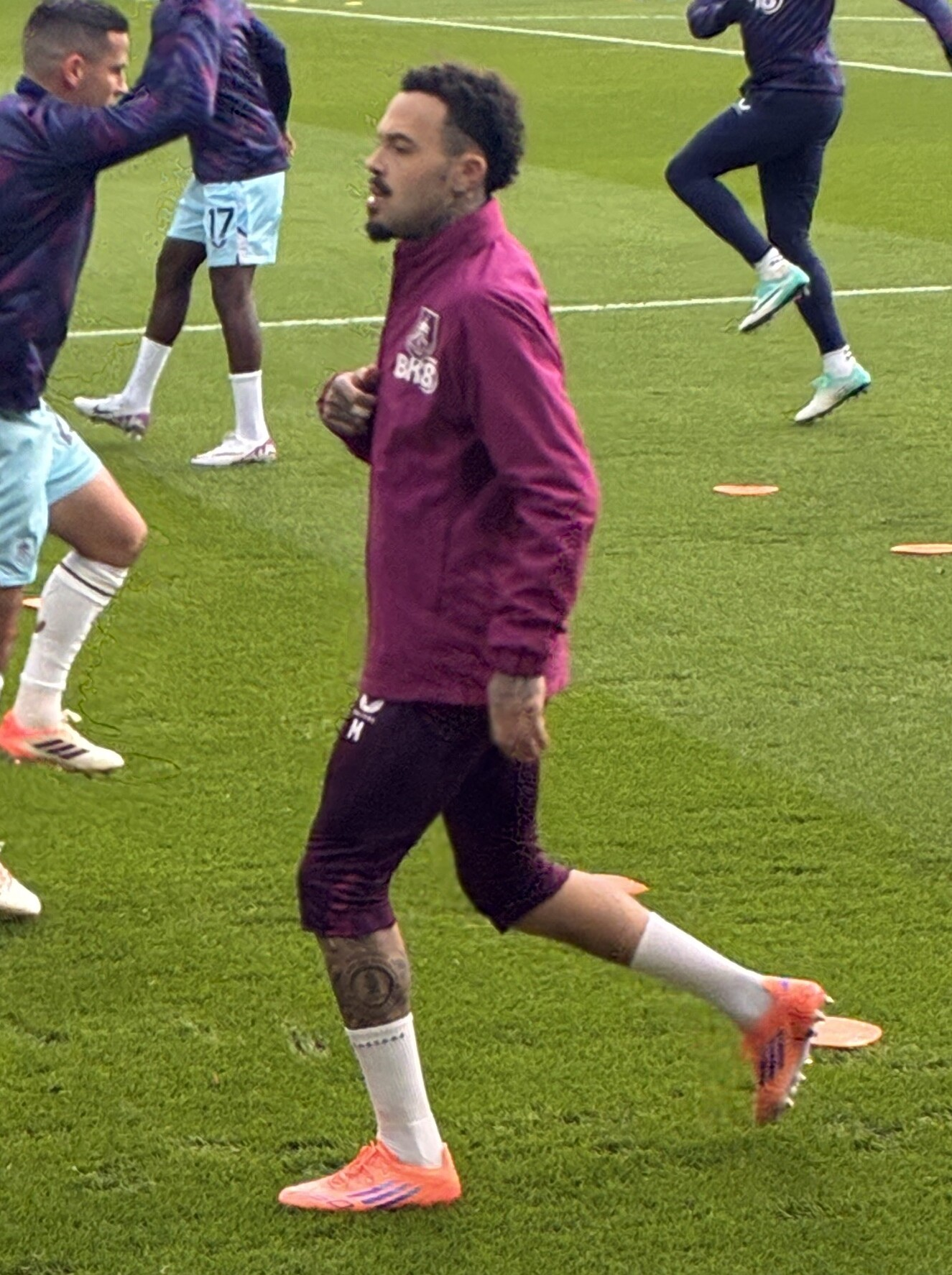
Hartman with Burnley in 2025 during training

On 26 June 2025, it was announced that Hartman joined Burnley on a four-year deal for an undisclosed fee. He made his debut for the club on 16 August 2025, starting in a 3–0 defeat against Tottenham Hotspur in the Premier League. With two assists for Zian Flemming in a 2–3 league win against Wolverhampton Wanderers on 26 October 2025, Hartman became the first-ever Burnley player with an assist in three consecutive away games in the Premier League.

==== Loan to Espanyol ====
On 7 July 2026, Hartman joined La Liga side Espanyol on a season-long loan.

== International career ==
In September 2022, Hartman was picked by Remko Bicentini for the squad of the Curaçao national team ahead of friendly games against Indonesia. However, Feyenoord did not want to let Hartman go to his national team and Hartman was replaced by Bradley Martis in the squad.

In March 2023, Hartman was included in the preliminary squad of the Netherlands national football team for the first two matches of the UEFA Euro 2024 qualifiers, but was not included in the final squad and was instead called up for the Netherlands U21 team. On 25 March, he made his debut for the U21 team as a starter in a friendly against Norway. He was later included in the U21 squad for the UEFA Under-21 Euro 2023.

On 1 September 2023, Hartman was called up to the senior national team for the first time by head coach Ronald Koeman for the Euro 2024 qualifiers against Greece and Republic of Ireland. He was once again called up a month later for the Euro 2024 qualifiers against France and Greece, resulting in him making his debut as well as scoring his first goal for the national team in a 2–1 defeat to France on 13 October 2023. Hartman was not included in the Dutch squad for UEFA Euro 2024 due to a knee injury. On 9 October 2025, he made his first minutes for the national team since his injury, replacing Micky van de Ven in a FIFA World Cup qualifier against Malta, which resulted in a 0–4 win.

== Career statistics ==
=== Club ===
As of match played 7 November 2026

Appearances and goals by club, season and competition
Club	Season	League			National cup (Note: Includes KNVB Cup, FA Cup, Copa del Rey)		Europe		Other		Total	
Club	Season	Division	Apps	Goals	Apps	Goals	Apps	Goals	Apps	Goals	Apps	Goals
Feyenoord	2022–23	Eredivisie	23	2	4	0	6 (Note: Appearances in UEFA Europa League)	0	—		33	2
Feyenoord	2023–24	Eredivisie	26	0	3	0	8 (Note: Six appearances in UEFA Champions League, two appearances in UEFA Europa League)	0	1 (Note: Appearance in Johan Cruyff Shield)	0	38	0
Feyenoord	2024–25	Eredivisie	12	0	—		—		—		12	0
Feyenoord	Total		61	2	7	0	14	0	1	0	83	2
Burnley	2025–26	Premier League	21	0	2	0	—		—		23	0
Espanyol (loan)	2026–27	La Liga	6	0	1	0	—		—		7	0
Career total			88	2	10	0	14	0	1	0	113	2

=== International ===
As of match played 9 October 2025

Appearances and goals by national team and year
National team	Year	Apps	Goals
Netherlands	2023	4	1
Netherlands	2025	1	0
Total		5	1

Scores and results list Netherlands goal tally first.

List of international goals scored by Quilindschy Hartman
No.	Date	Venue	Opponent	Score	Result	Competition
1	13 October 2023	Johan Cruyff Arena, Amsterdam, Netherlands	France	1–2	1–2	UEFA Euro 2024 qualifying

== Honours ==
Feyenoord

- Eredivisie: 2022–23
- KNVB Cup: 2023–24
