= Kenneth Soler =

Spanish footballer (born 2001)

Personal information
- Full name: Kenneth Soler Fernández
- Date of birth: 16 February 2001 (age 25)
- Place of birth: Calafell, Spain
- Height: 1.75 m (5 ft 9 in)
- Position: Winger

Team information
- Current team: Reus FCR
- Number: 18

Youth career
- Calafell
- 2011–2013: Barcelona
- 2013–2016: Reus
- 2016–2020: Espanyol

Senior career*
| Years | Team | Apps | (Gls) |
| 2020–2022 | Real Madrid B | 11 | (1) |
| 2021–2022 | → Internacional Madrid (loan) | 20 | (1) |
| 2022–2024 | Espanyol B | 50 | (5) |
| 2022–2025 | Espanyol | 1 | (0) |
| 2024–2025 | → Murcia (loan) | 6 | (1) |
| 2026– | Reus FCR | 15 | (4) |
- * Club domestic league appearances and goals as of 7 May 2026

Kenneth Soler Fernández (born 16 February 2001) is a Spanish professional footballer who plays mainly as a left winger for Segunda Federación club Reus FC Reddis.

== Career ==
Born in Calafell, Tarragona, Catalonia, Soler played for the youth sides of EFB Calafell, FC Barcelona and CF Reus Deportiu before joining RCD Espanyol in 2016. In May 2020, he reportedly agreed to a contract with Real Madrid, which was confirmed in August, after he was assigned to the reserves in Segunda División B.

Soler made his senior debut on 25 October 2020, coming on as a late substitute for Sergio Santos in a 2–1 home loss to Getafe CF. He scored his first senior goal the following 9 May, netting Castilla's fourth in a 4–2 away win over CF Talavera de la Reina.

On 4 August 2021, Soler was loaned to Primera División RFEF side Internacional de Madrid for the season. Upon returning, he left Los Blancos on 20 July 2022, and returned to Espanyol on 1 August, on a two-year contract; he was initially assigned to the B-team in Segunda Federación.

Soler made his first team debut with the Pericos on 12 November 2022, replacing Omar El Hilali in a 3–0 away win over CD Rincón, for the campaign's Copa del Rey. His professional debut occurred on 23 March 2024, as he replaced Álvaro Aguado late into a 1–1 Segunda División home draw against CD Tenerife.

On 30 May 2024, Soler renewed his contract with Espanyol until 2026, being definitely promoted to the main squad, but was loaned to Primera Federación side Real Murcia CF on 20 August.
