= Roberto Fernández (footballer, born 2002) =

Spanish association football player

Personal information
- Full name: Roberto Fernández Jaén
- Date of birth: 3 July 2002 (age 24)
- Place of birth: Puente Genil, Spain
- Height: 1.83 m (6 ft 0 in)
- Position: Forward

Team information
- Current team: Espanyol
- Number: 9

Youth career
- 2008–2012: Puente Genil
- 2012–2014: Córdoba
- 2014–2017: Sevilla
- 2017–2018: Córdoba
- 2018–2021: Málaga

Senior career*
Years	Team	Apps	(Gls)
2021–2024	Málaga	66	(17)
2022	Málaga B	0	(0)
2022–2023	→ Barcelona B (loan)	34	(6)
2024–2025	Braga	15	(2)
2025	→ Espanyol (loan)	19	(6)
2025–	Espanyol	49	(13)

International career^{‡}
2024–2025	Spain U21	6	(2)
2026–	Spain	2	(0)
- * Club domestic league appearances and goals as of 30 October 2026 ‡ National team caps and goals as of 12 November 2026

Roberto Fernández Jaén (born 3 July 2002) is a Spanish footballer who plays as a forward for RCD Espanyol and the Spain national team.

== Club career ==
=== Málaga ===
Born in Puente Genil, Córdoba, Andalusia, Fernández represented Puente Genil FC, Córdoba CF, Sevilla FC and Málaga CF as a youth. On 4 December 2020, while still a youth, he renewed his contract with the latter side until 2024.

On 16 August 2021, before even having appeared for the reserves, Fernández made his first-team debut by starting in a 0–0 home draw against CD Mirandés in the Segunda División. He scored his first professional goal six days later, netting the equalizer in a 2–2 away draw against UD Ibiza.

On 22 July 2022, Fernández joined FC Barcelona on a one-year loan deal, being initially assigned to the reserves in Primera Federación. Upon returning, he became an undisputed starter for the club, scoring 20 goals overall during the campaign as Málaga returned to the second division at first attempt.

=== Braga ===
On 9 July 2024, Fernández moved abroad for the first time in his career and signed a five-year contract with Primeira Liga side SC Braga, for a fee of € 1.8 million plus 1.2 million on variables. He scored his first goal for the club on 15 August, netting the side's second in a 2–1 away win over Servette FC in the UEFA Europa League.

=== Espanyol ===
On 14 January 2025, Fernández was loaned to La Liga side RCD Espanyol until the end of the season. He made his debut in the category three days later, scoring the winner in a 2–1 home success over Real Valladolid.

On 27 June 2025, Fernández signed a permanent six-year deal with the Pericos, after the club acquired 50% of his economic rights.

== International career ==
After representing Spain at under-21 level in 2024, Fernández received his first call-up to the full side on 18 September 2026, for the 2026-27 UEFA Nations League matches against England, Croatia and Czech Republic. He made his debut on 3 October 2026 against the Czech Republic.

== Career statistics ==
As of match played 30 October 2026

Appearances and goals by club, season and competition
Club	Season	League			National cup (Note: Includes Copa del Rey, Taça de Portugal)		League cup (Note: Includes Taça da Liga)		Europe		Other		Total	
Club	Season	Division	Apps	Goals	Apps	Goals	Apps	Goals	Apps	Goals	Apps	Goals	Apps	Goals
Málaga	2021–22	Segunda División	32	2	2	1	—		—		—		34	3
Málaga	2023–24	Primera Federación	34	15	2	0	—		—		4 (Note: Appearances in Primera Federación play-offs)	5	41	20
Málaga	Total		66	17	4	1	—		—		4	5	75	23
Málaga B	2021–22	Tercera Federación	0	0	—		—		—		1 (Note: Appearance in Tercera Federación play-offs)	0	1	0
Barcelona B (loan)	2022–23	Primera Federación	34	6	1	0	—		—		2	1	36	7
Braga	2024–25	Primeira Liga	15	2	2	0	1	0	12 (Note: Appearances in UEFA Europa League)	1	—		30	3
Espanyol (loan)	2024–25	La Liga	19	6	—		—		—		—		19	6
Espanyol	2025–26	La Liga	38	7	2	0	—		—		—		40	7
Espanyol	2026–27	La Liga	11	6	1	1	—		—		—		12	7
Espanyol	Espanyol total		68	19	3	1	—		—		—		71	20
Career total			182	44	10	2	1	0	12	1	7	6	212	53

=== International ===
As of match played 12 November 2026

Appearances and goals by national team and year
National team	Year	Apps	Goals
Spain	2026	2	0
Total		2	0
