= Roger Hinojo =

Spanish footballer (born 2005)

Personal information
- Full name: Roger Hinojo Estrada
- Date of birth: 21 February 2005 (age 21)
- Place of birth: Sallent, Spain
- Height: 1.80 m (5 ft 11 in)
- Position: Left-back

Team information
- Current team: Espanyol
- Number: 21

Youth career
- Gimnàstic Manresa
- 2014–2023: Espanyol

Senior career*
Years	Team	Apps	(Gls)
2023–2025	Espanyol B	32	(1)
2025–	Espanyol	2	(0)
2025–2026	→ Cultural Leonesa (loan)	37	(1)
- * Club domestic league appearances and goals as of 16 August 2026

Roger Hinojo Estrada (born 21 February 2005) is a Spanish professional footballer who plays as a left-back for RCD Espanyol.

== Career ==
Born in Cabrianes, Sallent, Barcelona, Catalonia, Hinojo joined RCD Espanyol's youth sides in 2014, from Club Gimnàstic de Manresa. He made his senior debut with the reserves on 19 November 2023, starting in a 1–1 Segunda Federación away draw against Torrent CF.

On 5 December 2023, Hinojo renewed his contract with the Pericos. He further extended his link until 2028 roughly one year later, and scored his first senior goal on 30 March 2025, netting the B's opener in a 3–2 home success over Torrent.

Hinojo made his first team – and La Liga – debut on 28 April 2025, coming on as a late substitute for Carlos Romero in a 1–0 away loss to Villarreal CF. On 13 August, he renewed his contract until 2030, and was loaned to Segunda División side Cultural y Deportiva Leonesa thirteen days later.

Hinojo scored his first professional goal on 14 September 2025, netting the opener in a 4–2 away win over Racing de Santander. Upon returning in July 2026, he was assigned to the main squad of the Pericos and received the number 21 jersey – honouring late club legend Dani Jarque – on 20 August of that year.
