= Leandro Cabrera =

Uruguayan footballer (born 1991)

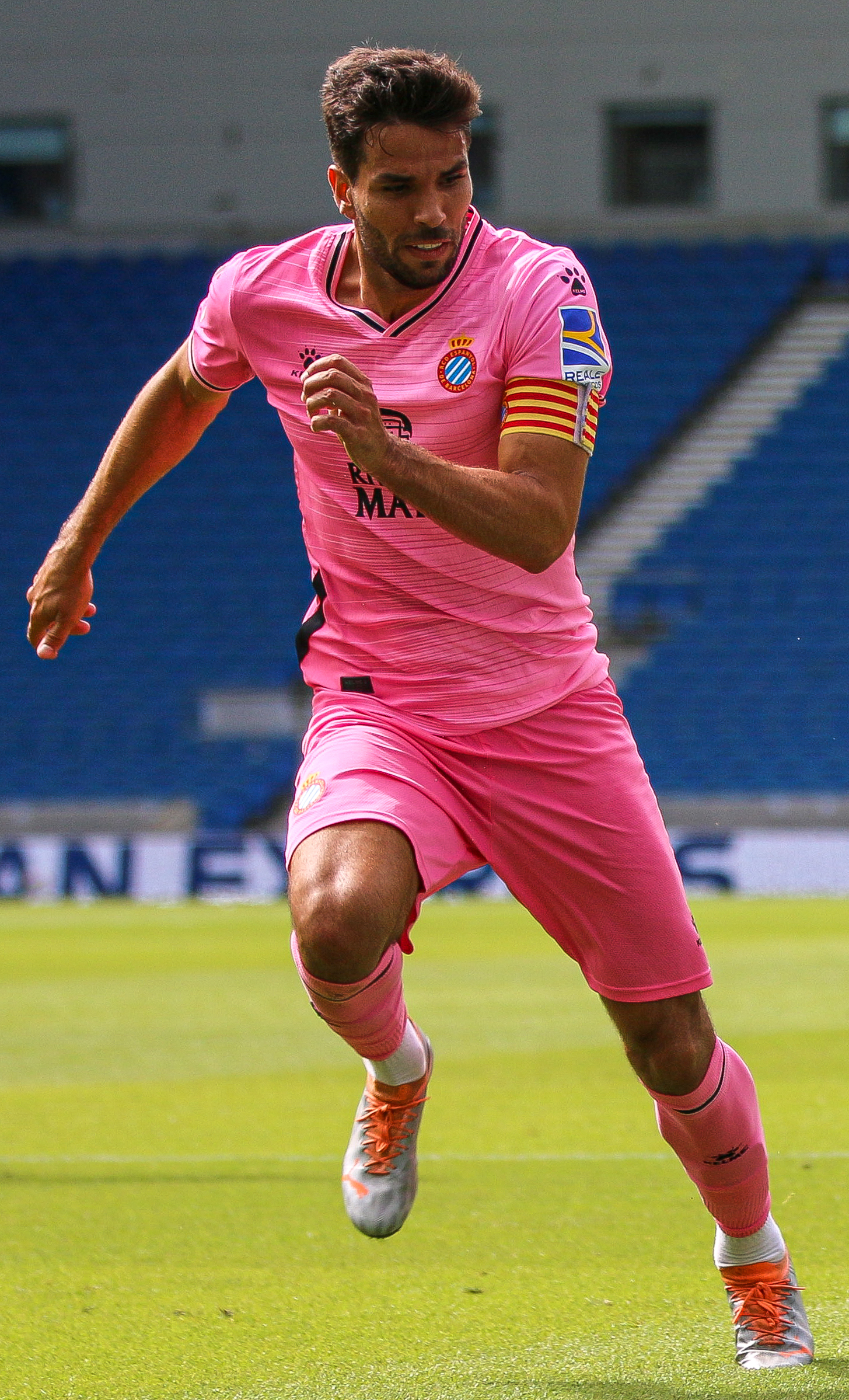
- Cabrera with Espanyol in 2022

Personal information
- Full name: Leandro Daniel Cabrera Sasía
- Date of birth: 17 June 1991 (age 35)
- Place of birth: Montevideo, Uruguay
- Height: 1.90 m (6 ft 3 in)
- Position: Defender

Team information
- Current team: Espanyol
- Number: 6

Youth career
- Defensor

Senior career*
Years	Team	Apps	(Gls)
2008–2009	Defensor	7	(0)
2009–2013	Atlético Madrid	4	(0)
2010–2011	→ Recreativo (loan)	11	(0)
2011–2012	→ Numancia (loan)	33	(0)
2012–2013	→ Hércules (loan)	39	(1)
2013–2014	Real Madrid B	33	(0)
2014–2017	Zaragoza	108	(4)
2017–2018	Crotone	5	(0)
2018	→ Getafe (loan)	9	(0)
2018–2020	Getafe	50	(4)
2020–	Espanyol	235	(10)

International career
2009–2011	Uruguay U20	22	(2)
- * Club domestic league appearances and goals as of 11:42, 2 October 2026 (UTC)

Leandro Daniel Cabrera Sasía (born 17 June 1991) is a Uruguayan professional footballer who plays for La Liga club Espanyol. Mainly a central defender, he can also play as a left-back.

He spent the vast majority of his career in Spain, making 299 appearances in the Segunda División and more than 200 in La Liga. Other than in his own country, he also represented clubs in Italy.

== Club career ==
=== Atlético Madrid ===
Born in Montevideo, Cabrera started his career with local Defensor Sporting, playing seven Primera División matches for the first team as they won the 2009 Clausura. In June 2009, he signed with La Liga club Atlético Madrid for €1.5 million, paid to former Uruguay international player Daniel Fonseca who owned his rights (and ceded 50% to Atlético).

In a strange first season, where he even failed to appear for the reserves, Cabrera's debut for the first team only took place on 2 May 2010, featuring as a left-back in a 3–1 away defeat against Sevilla FC. He was also booked in the game.

In the summer of 2010, Cabrera was loaned to Recreativo de Huelva for 2010–11, with the Andalusians in the Segunda División. He joined another second-tier side, CD Numancia, on loan for the next campaign. The following five years – the first two on loan – he continued competing at that level with Hércules CF, Real Madrid Castilla and Real Zaragoza.

=== Crotone ===
On 15 July 2017, free agent Cabrera joined FC Crotone on a three-year deal. His debut in the Serie A took place on 20 August, when he featured the full 90 minutes in the 3–0 home loss to AC Milan.

=== Getafe ===
Cabrera returned to the Spanish top flight on 15 January 2018, being loaned to Getafe CF. The move was made permanent on 7 July, and he rarely missed a match during his spell at the Coliseum Alfonso Pérez.

=== Espanyol ===
On 20 January 2020, Cabrera signed a four-and-a-half-year contract with RCD Espanyol after his €9 million release clause was paid. In March, he tested positive for COVID-19.

Following the departure of David López in the 2022 off-season, Cabrera was named captain while also agreeing to an extension until 2026. On 28 August, as his team had no more substitutions left (a reserve goalkeeper was on the bench, however), he played a couple of minutes in goal after Benjamin Lecomte was sent off already in injury time, conceding one goal from Karim Benzema in an eventual 3–1 home defeat to Real Madrid.

== International career ==
Cabrera represented Uruguay in two editions of the FIFA U-20 World Cup, reaching the round of 16 in 2009. On 7 January 2022, aged already 30, he was called by the full side for the first time, for 2022 FIFA World Cup qualifiers against Paraguay and Venezuela. In October, he was named in a 55-man preliminary squad for the finals in Qatar.

== Career statistics ==
As of match played 23 May 2026

Appearances and goals by club, season and competition
Club	Season	League			Cup (Note: Includes Copa del Rey and Coppa Italia)		Europe		Other		Total	
Club	Season	Division	Apps	Goals	Apps	Goals	Apps	Goals	Apps	Goals	Apps	Goals
Defensor	2008–09	Uruguayan Primera División	7	0	0	0	4 (Note: Appearances in Copa Libertadores)	0	–		11	0
Atlético Madrid	2009–10	La Liga	4	0	0	0	0	0	–		4	0
Recreativo (loan)	2010–11	Segunda División	11	0	1	0	–		–		12	0
Numancia (loan)	2011–12	Segunda División	33	0	1	0	–		–		34	0
Hércules (loan)	2012–13	Segunda División	39	1	1	0	–		–		40	1
Real Madrid B	2013–14	Segunda División	33	0	–		–		–		33	0
Zaragoza	2014–15	Segunda División	38	1	1	0	–		–		39	1
Zaragoza	2015–16	Segunda División	35	2	1	0	–		–		36	2
Zaragoza	2016–17	Segunda División	38	2	0	0	–		–		38	2
Zaragoza	Total		111	5	2	0	–		–		113	5
Crotone	2017–18	Serie A	5	0	2	0	–		–		7	0
Getafe	2017–18	La Liga	9	0	0	0	0	0	–		9	0
Getafe	2018–19	La Liga	32	2	4	0	0	0	–		36	2
Getafe	2019–20	La Liga	18	2	0	0	3 (Note: Appearances in UEFA Europa League)	1	–		21	3
Getafe	Total		59	4	4	0	3	1	–		66	5
Espanyol	2019–20	La Liga	17	0	0	0	0	0	–		17	0
Espanyol	2020–21	Segunda División	38	0	1	0	0	0	–		39	0
Espanyol	2021–22	La Liga	37	2	3	0	0	0	–		40	2
Espanyol	2022–23	La Liga	32	0	4	0	0	0	–		36	0
Espanyol	2023–24	Segunda División	37	1	2	0	–		–		39	1
Espanyol	2024–25	La Liga	33	4	–		–		–		33	4
Espanyol	2025–26	La Liga	37	3	–		–		–		37	3
Espanyol	Total		231	10	10	0	0	0	–		241	10
Career total			533	21	21	0	7	1	–		561	21

== Honours ==
Defensor

- Uruguayan Primera División: Clausura 2009

Atlético Madrid

- UEFA Europa League: 2009–10

Espanyol

- Segunda División: 2020–21
