= Carlos Romero (footballer, born 2001) =

Spanish footballer

Personal information
- Full name: Carlos Romero Serrano
- Date of birth: 29 October 2001 (age 25)
- Place of birth: Torrent, Spain
- Height: 1.74 m (5 ft 9 in)
- Position: Left-back

Team information
- Current team: Villarreal

Youth career
- Torre Levante
- 2019–2020: Villarreal

Senior career*
Years	Team	Apps	(Gls)
2018–2019	Torre Levante	1	(0)
2019–2022	Villarreal C	60	(0)
2022–2024	Villarreal B	46	(0)
2023–	Villarreal	8	(0)
2024–2026	→ Espanyol (loan)	70	(8)
- * Club domestic league appearances and goals as of 20:13, 19 August 2026 (UTC)

Carlos Romero Serrano (born 29 October 2001) is a Spanish professional footballer who plays as a left-back for La Liga club Villarreal.

== Club career ==
Born in Valencia, Serrano was a CF Torre Levante youth graduate. He made his first team debut on 10 November 2018, coming on as a late substitute and being sent off in a 1–0 Tercera División home loss against Atzeneta UE.

On 24 May 2019, Romero signed for Villarreal CF, and was initially assigned to the youth sides. He was definitely promoted to the C-team also in the fourth tier in October 2020, and became an undisputed starter for the side during the 2021–22 season.

Ahead of the 2022–23 campaign, Romero was promoted to the reserves in Segunda División. He made his professional debut on 29 August 2022, replacing Dani Tasende late into a 3–0 away loss against Granada CF.

Romero made his first team – and La Liga – debut on 17 September 2023, starting in a 2–1 home win over UD Almería. On 28 November, he extended his contract with Villarreal until June 2027.

On 9 July 2024, Romero was loaned to fellow top tier side RCD Espanyol for the season. On 27 June of the following year, he renewed his contract with the Yellow Submarine until 2029, and had his loan with Espanyol extended for a further year.

== Career statistics ==
As of match played 16 August 2026

Appearances and goals by club, season and competition
Club	Season	League			Copa del Rey		Europe		Total	
Club	Season	Division	Apps	Goals	Apps	Goals	Apps	Goals	Apps	Goals
Villarreal	2023–24	La Liga	7	0	1	0	–		8	0
Villarreal	2026–27	La Liga	1	0	0	0	0	0	1	0
Villarreal	Total		8	0	1	0	0	0	9	0
Espanyol (loan)	2024–25	La Liga	34	2	1	0	–		35	2
Espanyol (loan)	2025–26	La Liga	36	6	0	0	–		36	6
Espanyol (loan)	Total		70	8	1	0	–		71	8
Career total			78	8	2	0	0	0	80	8

== Honours ==
Individual

- La Liga Team of the Season: 2025–26
