= Balliu =

Balliu is a surname. Notable people with the surname include:

- Fahri Balliu, Albanian newspaper editor
- Iván Balliu (born 1992), Albanian footballer
