= Clemens Riedel =

German footballer

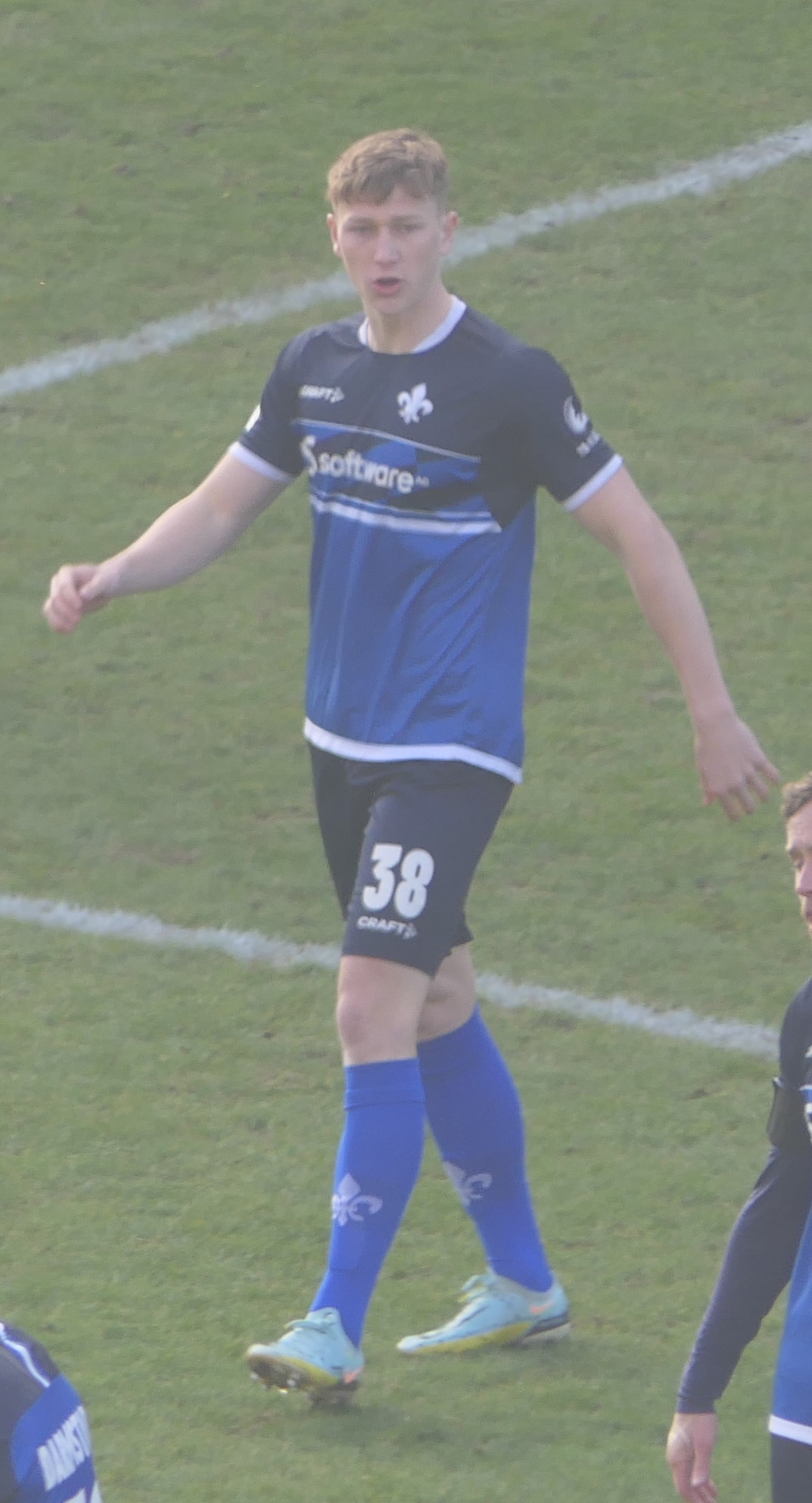
- Riedel in 2023

Personal information
- Date of birth: 19 July 2003 (age 23)
- Place of birth: Wölfersheim, Germany
- Height: 1.86 m (6 ft 1 in)
- Position: Centre-back

Team information
- Current team: Espanyol
- Number: 38

Youth career
- 2007–2013: SKV Obbornhofen
- 2013–2017: Eintracht Frankfurt
- 2017–2019: TSG Wieseck
- 2019–2021: Darmstadt 98

Senior career*
Years	Team	Apps	(Gls)
2021–2025	Darmstadt 98	77	(1)
2025–	Espanyol	20	(0)

International career
2021–2022	Germany U19	7	(0)
2023	Germany U21	1	(0)
- * Club domestic league appearances and goals as of 27 May 2026

Clemens Riedel (born 19 July 2003) is a German professional footballer who plays as a centre-back for La Liga club Espanyol. He previously played in Germany with Darmstadt 98 and has represented Germany at under-19 and under-21 youth international levels.

== Club career ==
=== Darmstadt 98 ===
Riedel was born in Wölfersheim, Hessen, Germany. He started playing football locally with SKV Obbornhofen before having a trial with Eintracht Frankfurt aged nine, and he joined their academy a year later. He stayed with Eintracht Frankfurt until 2017, when he moved to TSG Wieseck, and in 2019 he moved to Darmstadt 98 aged 16. He initially joined the youth setup but began to train with the first team during the 2020–21 season, and he made his senior debut for Darmstadt on 24 July 2021 as a substitute in a 2–0 2. Bundesliga defeat to Jahn Regensburg. He made his full debut for the club on 30 July 2021, in a 3–0 away defeat to Karlsruher SC, becoming the first Darmstadt academy graduate to start a league match since Burak Bilgin nine seasons prior, and after playing in four of the club's first five 2. Bundesliga games of the 2021–22 season, he signed his first professional contract with the club on 28 August 2021. He made nine league appearances for the club across the 2021–22 season.

In April 2023, Riedel extended his contract with Darmstadt to summer 2026. He contributed with 19 league appearances in the 2022–23 season as the club achieved promotion to the Bundesliga, as runners-up of the 2. Bundesliga.

Riedel made his Bundesliga debut on 26 August 2023, starting in a 4–1 home loss to Union Berlin, and made 14 Bundesliga appearances for the club over the course of the 2023–24 season, as they finished bottom of the Bundesliga and were relegated back to the 2. Bundesliga.

In August 2024, he became club captain of Darmstadt 98 after Fabian Holland, the previous club captain suffered a cruciate ligament tear. This made him the youngest club captain active in professional German football. He played in all but one of Darmstadt's league matches across the 2024–25 season, and he scored his first professional goal on 28 March 2025, with a header in a 2–1 away loss to SSV Ulm 1846.

=== Espanyol ===
On 25 August 2025, Riedel joined La Liga side Espanyol on a four-year contract. The transfer fee was reported to be approximately €2 million, with Darmstadt receiving 10% of any future sale.

== International career ==
He was called up to the Germany national under-19 team for the first time in August 2021, and made his debut for the side on 3 September 2021 in a 1–0 win over Switzerland. He made 7 appearances in total for the under-19 side.

In September 2023, Riedel was called up to the Germany under-21 team for the first time, and he made his first and only appearance for the team on 8 September, in a 2–0 win over Ukraine. He was again called up to the Germany under-21 team on 9 October 2023 for a Under-21 EURO qualification match against Bulgaria alongside Rocco Reitz of Borussia Mönchengladbach, after Marton Dardai and Jamil Siebert pulled out through injury, though Riedel pulled out of the squad himself two days later through injury.

== Style of play ==
Riedel is a centre-back, though he has also been used at right-back. In January 2025, Johannes Müller of the Frankfurter Allgemeine Zeitung noted his aggressive style of defending, the accuracy of his long passing and his ball carrying as facets of his style of play.

== Career statistics ==
Appearances and goals by club, season and competition
Club	Season	League			National cup (Note: Includes appearances in DFB-Pokal, Copa del Rey.)		Other		Total	
Club	Season	Division	Apps	Goals	Apps	Goals	Apps	Goals	Apps	Goals
Darmstadt 98	2021–22	2. Bundesliga	9	0	1	0	0	0	10	0
Darmstadt 98	2022–23	2. Bundesliga	19	0	1	0	0	0	20	0
Darmstadt 98	2023–24	Bundesliga	14	0	1	0	0	0	15	0
Darmstadt 98	2024–25	2. Bundesliga	33	1	3	0	0	0	36	1
Darmstadt 98	Total		75	1	6	0	0	0	81	1
Espanyol	2025–26	La Liga	14	0	1	0	0	0	15	0
Career total			89	1	7	0	0	0	96	1
