= Jailson (footballer, born 1984) =

Brazilian footballer

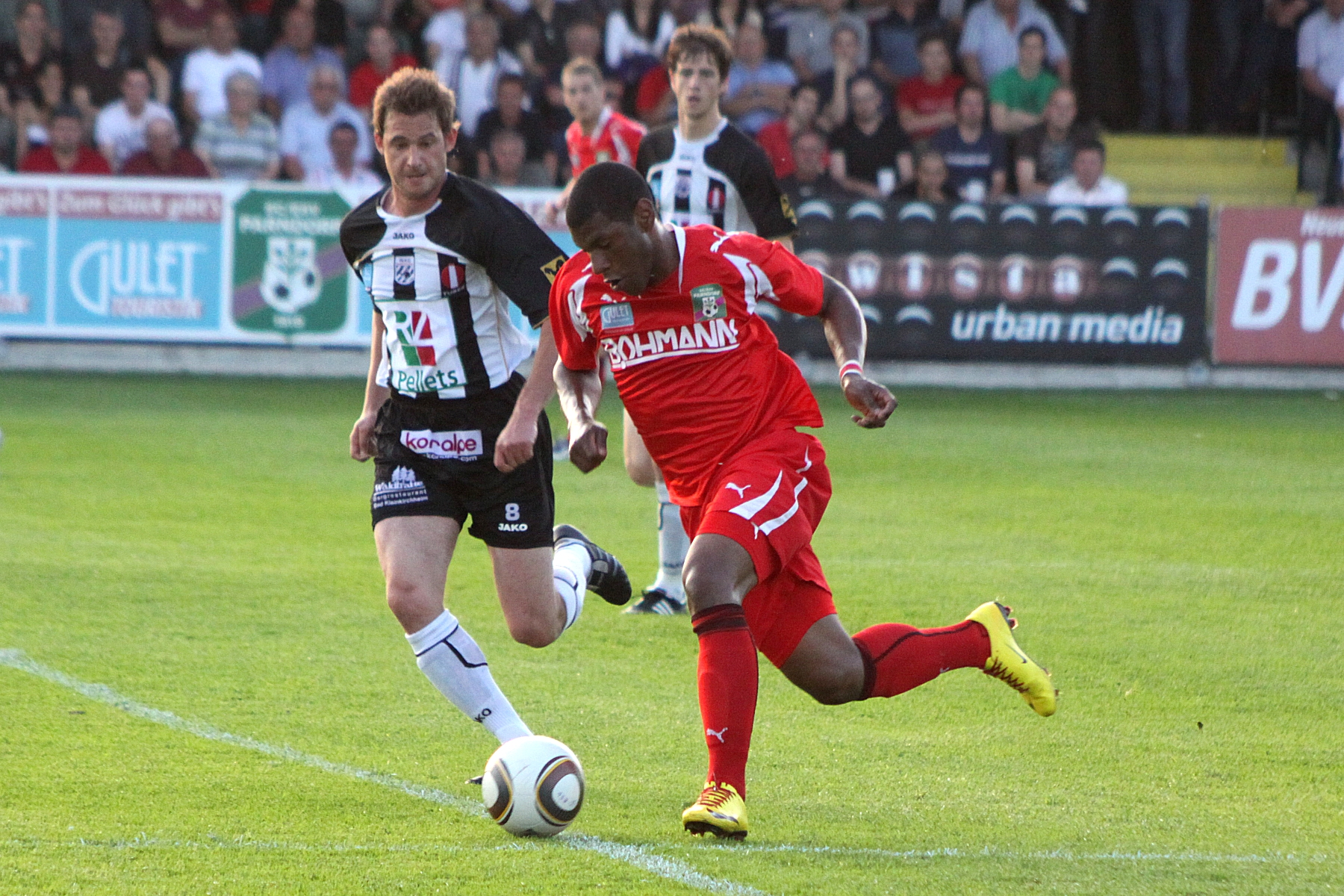

Personal information
- Full name: Jailson Severiano Alves
- Date of birth: 11 October 1984 (age 42)
- Place of birth: Duque de Caxias, Brazil
- Height: 1.79 m (5 ft 10 1/2 in)
- Position: Midfielder

Team information
- Current team: 1. SC Sollenau (player & U15 assistant)
- Number: 7

Senior career*
Years	Team	Apps	(Gls)
–2004	River Plate		
2004–2005	Sol de América		
2005–2006	3 de Febrero		
2006	Irapuato		
2006–2007	Fernando de la Mora		
2007–2013	SC-ESV Parndorf	164	(78)
2013–2017	Austria Lustenau	106	(12)
2017–	1. SC Sollenau	10	(5)

Managerial career
- 2017–: 1. SC Sollenau (U15 assistant)
- * Club domestic league appearances and goals as of 27 September 2017

Jailson Severiano Alves (born 11 October 1984 in Duque de Caxias), known as Jailson is a Brazilian footballer who currently plays as a midfielder for 1. SC Sollenau. He is also working as an assistant manager for the club's U15 team.
