= Antoniu Roca =

Spanish footballer

Personal information
- Full name: Antoniu Roca Vives
- Date of birth: 5 September 2002 (age 24)
- Place of birth: Martorell, Spain
- Height: 1.80 m (5 ft 11 in)
- Position: Winger

Team information
- Current team: Mallorca (on loan from Espanyol)
- Number: 23

Youth career
- Martorell
- Gramenet
- Badalona
- 2012–2016: Barcelona
- 2016–2017: Jàbac Terrassa
- 2017–2019: Damm
- 2019–2021: Espanyol

Senior career*
Years	Team	Apps	(Gls)
2021–2024	Espanyol B	63	(3)
2023–	Espanyol	45	(0)
2026–	→ Mallorca (loan)	6	(0)

International career
2025–	Catalonia	1	(1)
- * Club domestic league appearances and goals as of 27 September 2026

Antoniu Roca Vives (born 5 September 2002) is a Spanish professional footballer who plays as a winger for RCD Mallorca, on loan from RCD Espanyol.

== Career ==
Born in Martorell, Barcelona, Catalonia, Roca joined FC Barcelona's La Masia in 2012, after representing CF Badalona, UDA Gramenet and AE Martorell. He left the former in 2016, and played for UFB Jàbac Terrassa and CF Damm before moving to RCD Espanyol in 2019.

Roca made his senior debut with the reserves on 17 January 2021, coming on as a late substitute for Gori in a 0–0 Segunda División B away draw against AE Prat. He scored his first senior goal on 18 December, netting the winner in a 1–0 home success over SD Huesca B in the Segunda División RFEF.

On 15 March 2022, Roca renewed his contract with the Pericos until 2024. He made his first team debut on 8 September 2023, replacing Pere Milla late into a 4–1 Segunda División away routing of Levante UD.

On 7 November 2023, Roca further extended his link with Espanyol until 2026, with an option for a further year. He made his La Liga debut the following 19 August, replacing Alejo Véliz in a 1–0 away loss to Real Valladolid.

On 19 August 2025, Roca agreed to another contract extension with Espanyol, now until 2028, and became a permanent member of the first team after being assigned the number 20 jersey. However, he only made four starts during the season, and was loaned to Segunda División side RCD Mallorca on 24 July 2026.

== Career statistics ==
As of match played 27 September 2026

Appearances and goals by club, season and competition
Club	Season	League			Cup		Other		Total	
Club	Season	Division	Apps	Goals	Apps	Goals	Apps	Goals	Apps	Goals
Espanyol B	2020–21	Segunda División B	3	0	—		1 (Note: Appearance in Segunda División B play-offs)	0	4	0
Espanyol B	2021–22	Segunda Federación	27	2	—		1 (Note: Appearance in 2022 Segunda División RFEF play-offs)	0	28	0
Espanyol B	2022–23	Segunda Federación	21	0	—		2 (Note: Appearances in 2023 Segunda Federación play-offs)	0	23	0
Espanyol B	2023–24	Segunda Federación	12	1	—		—		12	1
Espanyol B	Total		63	3	—		4	0	67	3
Espanyol	2023–24	Segunda División	6	0	—		0	0	6	0
Espanyol	2024–25	La Liga	26	0	2	0	—		28	0
Espanyol	2025–26	La Liga	13	0	2	0	—		15	0
Espanyol	Total		45	0	4	0	—		49	0
Mallorca (loan)	2026–27	Segunda División	6	0	0	0	—		6	0
Career total			114	3	4	0	4	0	122	3
