= Rubén Sánchez (footballer, born 2001) =

Spanish footballer

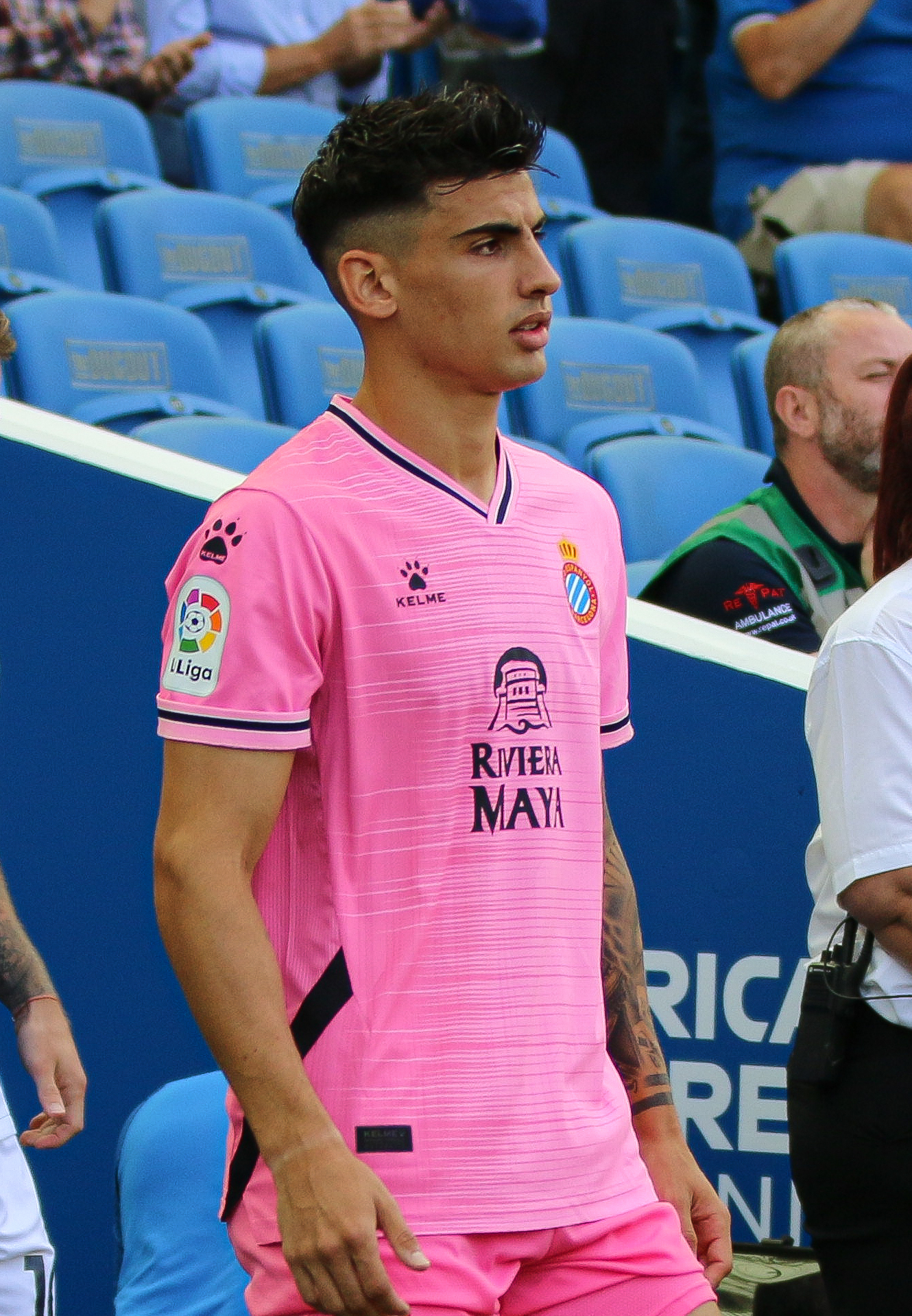
- Sánchez with Espanyol in 2022

Personal information
- Full name: Rubén Sánchez Sáez
- Date of birth: 4 February 2001 (age 25)
- Place of birth: Barcelona, Spain
- Height: 1.85 m (6 ft 1 in)
- Position: Right-back

Team information
- Current team: Elche

Youth career
- Badalona
- 2018–2021: Espanyol

Senior career*
| Years | Team | Apps | (Gls) |
| 2020–2023 | Espanyol B | 52 | (3) |
| 2021–2026 | Espanyol | 48 | (0) |
| 2023–2024 | → Mirandés (loan) | 21 | (0) |
| 2024–2025 | → Granada (loan) | 32 | (1) |
| 2026– | Elche | 0 | (0) |

International career
| 2022– | Catalonia | 1 | (0) |
- * Club domestic league appearances and goals as of 27 May 2026

Rubén Sánchez Sáez (born 4 February 2001) is a Spanish professional footballer who plays for Elche CF. Mainly a right-back, he can also play as a right winger.

== Club career ==
Born in Barcelona, Catalonia, Sánchez joined the youth academy of RCD Espanyol in 2018, from CF Badalona. He made his senior debut with the reserves on 16 February 2020, coming on as a half-time substitute in a 0–0 Segunda División B home draw against Valencia CF Mestalla.

Sánchez signed a professional contract with the club on 21 July 2021, keeping him until 2024. He made his professional debut with Espanyol in a 2–0 La Liga win over Cádiz CF on 18 October 2021.

Sánchez started to feature more regularly with the main squad during the 2022–23 season, but his side suffered relegation. On 18 August 2023, he was loaned to Segunda División side CD Mirandés, for one year.

On 31 January 2024, after being a starter at Mirandés, Sánchez was recalled by the Pericos, being definitely promoted to the first team. On 23 July, after helping the club to achieve promotion to La Liga, he moved to Granada CF in the second division on a one-year loan deal.

Back to Espanyol in July 2025, Sánchez spent the campaign as a backup to fellow youth graduate Omar El Hilali. On 1 September 2026, he moved to Elche CF also in the top tier on a three-year contract.
