= Omar El Hilali =

Moroccan footballer

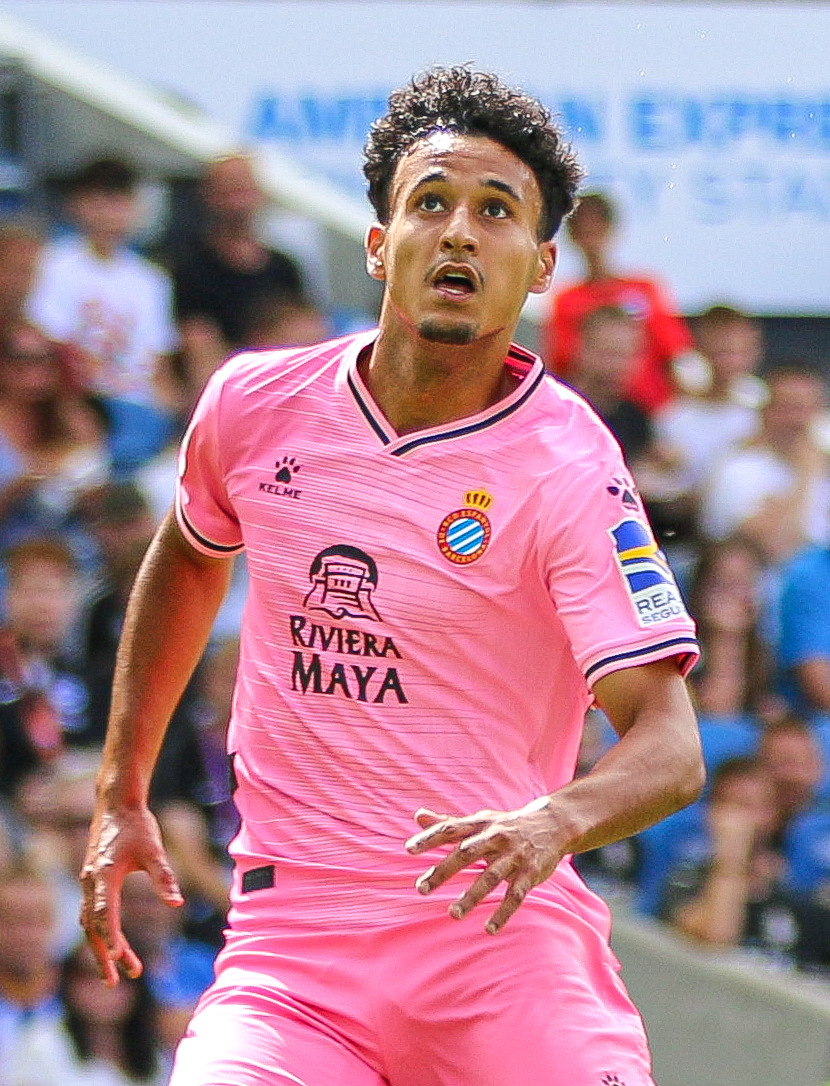
- El Hilali with Espanyol in 2022

Personal information
- Full name: Omar El Hilali Khayat
- Date of birth: 12 September 2003 (age 23)
- Place of birth: L'Hospitalet de Llobregat, Spain
- Height: 1.83 m (6 ft 0 in)
- Position: Right-back

Team information
- Current team: Espanyol
- Number: 23

Youth career
- Santa Eulàlia
- 2016–2020: Espanyol

Senior career*
Years	Team	Apps	(Gls)
2020–2023	Espanyol B	58	(0)
2021–	Espanyol	126	(0)

International career^{‡}
2021–2022	Morocco U20	7	(0)
2023–	Morocco U23	3	(0)
2025–	Morocco	1	(0)
Medal record
Representing Morocco
U-23 Africa Cup of Nations
Winner	2023 Morocco
- * Club domestic league appearances and goals as of 30 October 2026 ‡ National team caps and goals as of 8 September 2025

Omar El Hilali Khayat (born 12 September 2003) is a professional footballer who plays as a right-back for La Liga club Espanyol. Born in Spain, he represents the Morocco national team.

== Club career ==
Born in L'Hospitalet de Llobregat, Barcelona, Catalonia, El Hilali joined RCD Espanyol's youth setup at the age of 13, from hometown side CF Santa Eulàlia. He made his senior debut with the reserves on 18 October 2020, starting in a 2–1 Segunda División B home win against AE Prat.

El Hilali made his first-team debut at the age of just 17 on 4 April 2021, coming on as a second-half substitute for injured Óscar Gil in a 3–0 away success over Albacete Balompié in the Segunda División. On 14 December 2023, after establishing himself as a first team regular, he extended his contract with the club until 2027, being definitely promoted to the main squad.

== International career ==
El Hilali was born in Spain to a Moroccan family, with roots in Tangier. He represented the Morocco U20s at the 2021 Africa U-20 Cup of Nations.

In June 2023, he was included in the final squad of the under-23 national team for the 2023 U-23 Africa Cup of Nations, hosted by Morocco itself, where the Atlas Lions won their first title and qualified for the 2024 Summer Olympics.

== Career statistics ==
=== Club ===
As of match played 30 October 2026

Appearances and goals by club, season and competition
Club	Season	League			Copa del Rey		Other		Total	
Club	Season	Division	Apps	Goals	Apps	Goals	Apps	Goals	Apps	Goals
Espanyol B	2020–21	Segunda División B	17	0	—		—		17	0
Espanyol B	2021–22	Segunda División RFEF	30	0	—		1 (Note: Appearance(s) in Promotion play-offs)	0	31	0
Espanyol B	2022–23	Segunda Federación	11	0	—		2	0	13	0
Espanyol B	Total		58	0	—		3	0	61	0
Espanyol	2020–21	Segunda División	3	0	0	0	—		3	0
Espanyol	2022–23	La Liga	5	0	1	0	—		6	0
Espanyol	2023–24	Segunda División	36	0	2	0	3	0	41	0
Espanyol	2024–25	La Liga	36	0	1	0	—		37	0
Espanyol	2025–26	La Liga	36	0	1	0	—		37	0
Espanyol	2026–27	La Liga	10	0	1	0	—		11	0
Espanyol	Total		126	0	6	0	3	0	135	0
Career total			184	0	6	0	6	0	196	0

== Honours ==
Espanyol

- Segunda División: 2020–21

Morocco U23

- U-23 Africa Cup of Nations: 2023
