= José Salinas (footballer) =

Valencian footballer

Personal information
- Full name: José Salinas Morán
- Date of birth: 30 September 2000 (age 26)
- Place of birth: Callosa de Segura, Spain
- Height: 1.79 m (5 ft 10 in)
- Position: Left back

Team information
- Current team: Málaga (on loan from Espanyol)
- Number: 12

Youth career
- 2011–2018: Kelme
- 2018–2019: Elche

Senior career*
Years	Team	Apps	(Gls)
2019–2021	Elche B	32	(1)
2021–2025	Elche	60	(2)
2021–2022	→ Unionistas (loan)	37	(6)
2022–2023	→ Mirandés (loan)	41	(2)
2025–	Espanyol	11	(0)
2026–	→ Málaga (loan)	0	(0)
- * Club domestic league appearances and goals as of 27 May 2026

José Salinas Morán (born 30 September 2000) is a Spanish footballer who plays as a left back for Málaga CF, on loan from RCD Espanyol.

== Club career ==
Born in Callosa de Segura, Alicante, Valencian Community, Salinas joined Elche CF's youth setup in 2018, from Kelme CF. He made his senior debut with the reserves on 22 September 2019, starting in a 4–0 Tercera División home routing of Novelda CF.

Salinas scored his first senior goal on 29 February 2020, netting his team's only in a 1–3 home loss against Villarreal CF C. He made his first team debut on 6 January of the following year, starting in a 1–0 away win against CF La Nucía, for the season's Copa del Rey.

Salinas' professional debut occurred on 16 January 2021, as he started in a 0–2 loss at Rayo Vallecano, also for the national cup. On 21 August, he extended his contract for a further year and was loaned to Primera División RFEF side Unionistas de Salamanca CF.

On 30 July 2022, Salinas renewed his contract until 2025 and moved to Segunda División side CD Mirandés on loan for the season. He scored his first professional goal on 22 October, netting the opener in a 1–1 home draw against SD Huesca.

Upon returning, Salinas was definitely assigned to the first team squad of the Franjiverdes, now also in the second division. On 25 June 2025, after helping the side to achieve promotion to La Liga, he agreed to a three-year deal with RCD Espanyol also in the top tier.

Salinas made his debut in the main category of Spanish football on 17 August 2025, replacing Javi Puado late into a 2–1 home win over Atlético Madrid. The following 27 July, after being rarely used, he was loaned to fellow top tier side Málaga CF, for one year.
