= José Ángel López (footballer, born 2006) =

Spanish footballer (born 2006)

Personal information
- Full name: José Ángel López Gálvez
- Date of birth: 24 March 2006 (age 20)
- Place of birth: Sanlúcar la Mayor, Spain
- Height: 1.75 m (5 ft 9 in)
- Position: Right-back

Team information
- Current team: Espanyol B
- Number: 22

Youth career
- Sevilla
- 2021–2023: Recreativo
- 2023–2024: Espanyol

Senior career*
Years	Team	Apps	(Gls)
2023	Recreativo B	1	(0)
2024–	Espanyol B	50	(2)
2026–	Espanyol	1	(0)

International career
2024	Spain U18	1	(0)
2025	Spain U19	1	(0)
- * Club domestic league appearances and goals as of 18 September 2026

José Ángel López Gálvez (born 21 February 2005) is a Spanish professional footballer who plays as a right-back for RCD Espanyol B.

== Club career ==
Born in Sanlúcar la Mayor, Seville, Andalusia, López played for Sevilla FC and Recreativo de Huelva as a youth, making his senior debut with the latter's reserves in Primera Andaluza in 2023. In September of that year, he joined RCD Espanyol and returned to the youth setup.

On 18 November 2024, after establishing himself as a regular starter for the Pericos' B-team, López renewed his contract until 2029. The following 29 January, he made his unofficial first team debut by starting in a 1–0 Copa Catalunya away win over CE Sabadell FC.

López made his professional – and La Liga – debut on 18 September 2026, starting in a 3–1 home loss to Elche CF.

== International career ==
López represented Spain at under-18 and under-19 levels.
