= Marcos Fernández (footballer, born May 2003) =

Spanish footballer

Personal information
- Full name: Marcos Fernández Sánchez
- Date of birth: 17 May 2003 (age 23)
- Place of birth: Cambrils, Spain
- Height: 1.76 m (5 ft 9 in)
- Position: Forward

Team information
- Current team: Espanyol
- Number: 18

Youth career
- La Salle Cambrils
- La Floresta
- 2015–2019: Gimnàstic
- 2019–2022: Betis

Senior career*
Years	Team	Apps	(Gls)
2021–2025	Betis B	70	(23)
2025–	Espanyol	1	(0)
2025–2026	→ Ceuta (loan)	35	(14)
- * Club domestic league appearances and goals as of 16 August 2026

Marcos Fernández Sánchez (born 17 May 2003) is a Spanish footballer who plays for RCD Espanyol. Mainly a forward, he can also play as a right winger.

== Career ==
=== Early career ===
Born in Cambrils, Tarragona, Catalonia, Fernández joined Gimnàstic de Tarragona's youth sides in 2015, aged 12. In 2019, he moved to Real Betis and was initially assigned to the Juvenil squad.

=== Betis ===
Fernández made his senior debut with the reserves on 27 November 2021, coming on as a late substitute for José Lara in a 2–1 Primera División RFEF away loss to CD Castellón. The following 23 August, he signed a new three-year deal with the club, being definitely promoted to the B-side now in Segunda Federación.

Fernández scored his first senior goal on 3 September 2022, netting the B's winner in a 1–0 away success over FC Cartagena B. He finished the season as the side's top scorer with 11 goals – highlights included a hat-trick in a 4–1 away routing of CD Utrera on 9 April 2023 – but suffered a serious ankle injury in July 2023 in the first training of the new campaign.

Back to action in February 2024, Fernández managed to score three goals in 11 appearances as Betis Deportivo returned to the third division. Despite featuring regularly with the first team in the 2024 pre-season, he only played for the B-team during the entire season, being the side's top scorer in the 2024–25 Primera Federación with 10 goals.

=== Espanyol ===
On 10 June 2025, free agent Fernández moved straight to La Liga after signing a three-year deal with RCD Espanyol. On 28 August, however, he was loaned to Segunda División side AD Ceuta FC on a one-year deal. He made his professional debut two days later, starting in a 4–1 away loss to Racing de Santander.

Fernández scored his first professional goals on 14 September 2025, netting a brace in a 3–3 away draw against Castellón. He finished the season with 14 goals, being the club's top scorer as they finished 11th.

Back to the Pericos in July 2026, Fernández impressed during the pre-season, and was registered in the main squad after receiving the number 18 jersey in the following month. He made his top tier debut on 16 August, replacing Edu Expósito late into a 3–0 home win over Levante UD.
