= Rafel Bauzà =

Spanish footballer (born 2005)

Personal information
- Full name: Rafel Bauzà Sureda
- Date of birth: 31 January 2005 (age 21)
- Place of birth: Sant Llorenç des Cardassar, Spain
- Height: 1.83 m (6 ft 0 in)
- Position: Midfielder

Team information
- Current team: Espanyol
- Number: 26

Youth career
- Fundación Marcet
- Sant Andreu
- 2021–2023: Espanyol

Senior career*
Years	Team	Apps	(Gls)
2023–2025	Espanyol B	52	(1)
2024–	Espanyol	9	(0)
2025–2026	→ Mirandés (loan)	38	(4)
- * Club domestic league appearances and goals as of 16 August 2026

Rafel Bauzà Sureda (born 31 January 2005) is a Spanish professional footballer who plays as a midfielder for RCD Espanyol.

== Career ==
Born in Sant Llorenç des Cardassar, Balearic Islands, Bauzà moved to Barcelona at the age of nine, and joined RCD Espanyol's youth sides in 2021, after representing Fundación Marcet and UE Sant Andreu. On 12 May 2023, while still a youth, he renewed his contract until 2026.

Bauzà made his senior debut with the reserves on 3 September 2023, starting in a 1–0 Segunda Federación away loss to Hércules CF. He made his first team debut on 11 May 2024, coming on as a second-half substitute for José Gragera in a 0–0 Segunda División away draw against Real Valladolid.

Bauzà managed to feature in a further four matches for the main squad during the season (including two in the play-offs) as the club achieved promotion to La Liga. He made his debut in the category on 3 November 2024, starting in a 3–1 away loss to rivals FC Barcelona.

On 5 February 2025, Bauzà further extended his link with the Pericos until 2028. On 25 August, he was loaned to CD Mirandés in the second division for the campaign.
