= Pablo Ramón =

Spanish footballer (born 2001)

Personal information
- Full name: Pablo Ramón Parra
- Date of birth: 30 June 2001 (age 25)
- Place of birth: Calvià, Spain
- Height: 1.85 m (6 ft 1 in)
- Position: Centre-back

Team information
- Current team: Racing Santander
- Number: 5

Youth career
- 2008–2011: Son Caliu
- 2011–2019: Mallorca
- 2019–2020: Real Madrid

Senior career*
Years	Team	Apps	(Gls)
2018–2019	Mallorca B	30	(2)
2018–2019	Mallorca	0	(0)
2020–2025	Real Madrid B	59	(0)
2023–2024	→ Mirandés (loan)	35	(0)
2025–	Espanyol	0	(0)
2025–2026	→ Racing Santander (loan)	27	(0)
2026–	Racing Santander	0	(0)

International career^{‡}
2018–2019	Spain U18	4	(1)
2019–2020	Spain U19	6	(1)
- * Club domestic league appearances and goals as of 31 May 2026 ‡ National team caps and goals as of 21:33, 25 September 2022 (UTC)

Pablo Ramón Parra (born 30 June 2001) is a Spanish professional footballer who plays as a centre-back for Segunda División club Racing de Santander.

== Club career ==
=== Mallorca ===
Born in Calvià, Majorca, Balearic Islands, Ramón represented RCD Mallorca as a youth. On 9 September 2018, aged 17, he made his senior debut with the reserves by starting in a 7–0 away routing of CD Murense.

Ramón made his first-team debut on 31 October 2018, starting in a 1–2 home loss against Real Valladolid, for the season's Copa del Rey; by doing so, he became the first player of the 21st century to appear for the club.

=== Real Madrid ===
On 31 January 2019, Ramón agreed to a contract with Real Madrid, effective as of 1 July. He was promoted to Real Madrid Castilla for the 2020–21 season in Segunda División B, subsequently featuring with the club in Primera Federación.

==== Loan to Mirandés ====
On 8 August 2023, Ramón moved to Segunda División side CD Mirandés on a one-year loan deal. He was a regular starter during the campaign, featuring in 36 matches overall as the club avoided relegation, but suffered a knee injury in April 2024.

=== Espanyol ===
On 3 January 2025, after reaching the final stages of his recovery, Ramón signed a three-and-a-half-year contract with RCD Espanyol in the top tier; Real Madrid also retained 50% of his economic rights.

=== Racing Santander ===
On 28 August 2025, after failing to make an appearance for the Pericos, Ramón moved to second division side Racing de Santander on a one-year loan deal. Regularly used as the club achieved promotion to the top tier as champions, he signed a permanent three-year deal with the club on 5 August 2026.

== Career statistics ==
=== Club ===
As of 19 December 2023.

Appearances and goals by club, season and competition
Club	Season	League			Cup		Other		Total	
Club	Season	Division	Apps	Goals	Apps	Goals	Apps	Goals	Apps	Goals
Mallorca B	2018–19	Tercera División	30	2	—		—		30	2
Mallorca	2018–19	Segunda División	0	0	2	0	—		2	0
Real Madrid Castilla	2020–21	Segunda División B	16	0	—		1 (Note: Appearance in 2021 Segunda División B play-offs)	0	17	0
Real Madrid Castilla	2021–22	Primera División RFEF	28	0	—		—		28	0
Real Madrid Castilla	2022–23	Primera Federación	15	0	—		4 (Note: Appearances in 2023 Primera Federación play-offs)	0	19	0
Real Madrid Castilla	Total		59	0	0	0	5	0	64	0
Mirandés (loan)	2023–24	Segunda División	20	0	1	0	0	0	21	0
Career total			109	2	3	0	5	0	117	2

== Honours ==
Real Madrid Juvenil A

- UEFA Youth League: 2019–20

Racing Santander

- Segunda División: 2025–26
