= Urko González de Zárate =

Spanish footballer

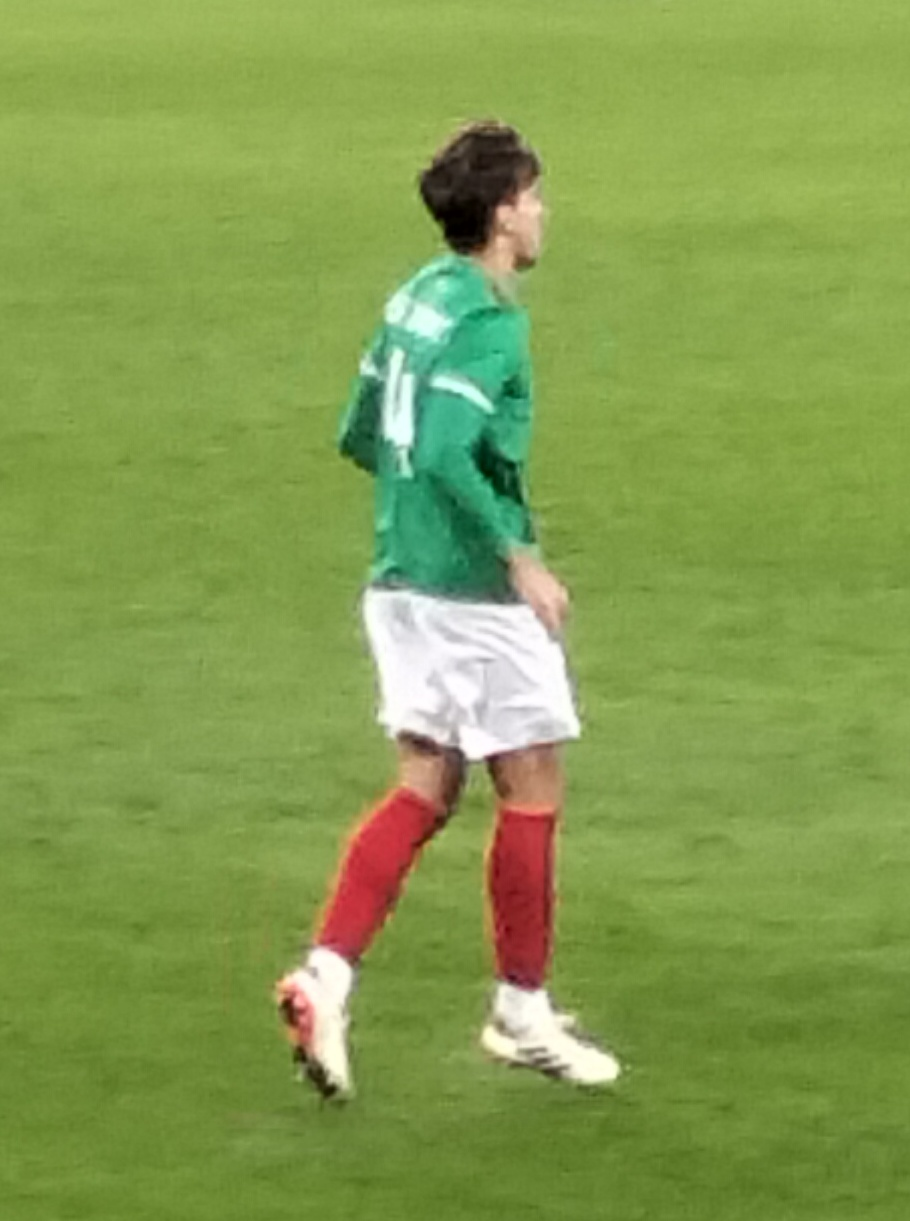
- González de Zárate with the Basque Country in 2024

Personal information
- Full name: Urko González de Zárate Quirós
- Date of birth: 20 March 2001 (age 25)
- Place of birth: Vitoria-Gasteiz, Spain
- Height: 1.89 m (6 ft 2 in)
- Positions: Centre-back; defensive midfielder

Team information
- Current team: Espanyol
- Number: 4

Youth career
- Real Sociedad

Senior career*
Years	Team	Apps	(Gls)
2019–2020	Real Sociedad C	22	(0)
2020–2023	Real Sociedad B	73	(0)
2020–2025	Real Sociedad	9	(0)
2025	→ Espanyol (loan)	17	(0)
2025–	Espanyol	35	(0)

International career^{‡}
2022	Spain U21	1	(0)
2024–	Basque Country	1	(0)
- * Club domestic league appearances and goals as of 27 May 2026 ‡ National team caps and goals as of 24 March 2024

Urko González de Zárate Quirós (born 20 March 2001) is a Spanish professional footballer who plays as either a centre-back or a defensive midfielder for RCD Espanyol.

== Club career ==
González de Zárate was born in Vitoria-Gasteiz, Álava, Basque Country, and was a Real Sociedad youth graduate. He made his senior debut with the C-team on 3 February 2019, coming on as a second-half substitute in a 2–2 Tercera División away draw against CD Santurtzi.

González de Zárate was definitely promoted to the C's ahead of the 2019–20 season, and subsequently became a regular starter for the side. On 1 July 2020, he renewed his contract until 2024, and was promoted to the reserves in Segunda División B.

González de Zárate made his first team – and La Liga – debut on 20 September 2020, replacing Ander Guevara late into a 0–0 home draw against Real Madrid. On 4 January 2024, he was definitely promoted to the main squad, being assigned the number 15 jersey.

On 23 January 2025, after being rarely used, González de Zárate was loaned to fellow top tier side RCD Espanyol until the end of the campaign. On 28 August, he signed a permanent five-year contract with the Pericos.

== Career statistics ==
=== Club ===
As of match played 16 August 2025

Appearances and goals by club, season and competition
Club	Season	League			National cup		Europe		Other		Total	
Club	Season	Division	Apps	Goals	Apps	Goals	Apps	Goals	Apps	Goals	Apps	Goals
Real Sociedad C	2019–20	Segunda División B	22	0	—		—		—		22	0
Real Sociedad B	2020–21	Segunda División B	15	0	—		—		2 (Note: Appearance(s) in Segunda División B play-offs)	0	17	0
Real Sociedad B	2021–22	Segunda División	35	0	—		—		—		35	0
Real Sociedad B	2022–23	Primera Federación	23	0	—		—		2	0	25	0
Real Sociedad B	Total		73	0	—		—		4	0	77	0
Real Sociedad	2020–21	La Liga	2	0	0	0	0	0	—		2	0
Real Sociedad	2021–22	La Liga	0	0	0	0	0	0	—		0	0
Real Sociedad	2022–23	La Liga	0	0	0	0	1 (Note: Appearance in UEFA Europa League)	0	—		1	0
Real Sociedad	2023–24	La Liga	4	0	3	0	0	0	—		7	0
Real Sociedad	2024–25	La Liga	2	0	2	0	1	0	—		5	0
Real Sociedad	2025–26	La Liga	1	0	0	0	—		—		1	0
Real Sociedad	Total		9	0	5	0	2	0	—		16	0
Career total			104	0	5	0	2	0	4	0	115	0
