= José Maria Tallada =

Spanish economist, professor, politician, and sports leader

- Born: Josep Maria Tallada i Paulí; 9 July 1884; Barcelona, Catalonia, Spain
- Died: 1 July 1946 (aged 61); Barcelona, Catalonia, Spain
- Resting place: Cemetery of Montjuïc; 41.355299°N 2.155061°E
- Citizenship: Spanish
- Occupations: Economist; Professor; Politician; Demographer, Sports leader
- Known for: President of the Catalan Football Federation
- Political party: Regionalist League

Director of Museu Social
- In office 1909–1920

President of the Catalan Football Federation
- In office 1914–1915
- Preceded by: Narciso Deop
- Succeeded by: Ricardo Cabot

José Maria Tallada Paulí (9 July 1884 – 1 July 1946) was a Spanish economist, professor, politician, demographer, and sports leader. He was a director of the Banco de Vizcaya, a university professor, and a deputy in the Parliament of Catalonia for the Regionalist League. He published several works throughout his life, including volumes on economics, urban planning, sociology and statistics, being the introducer to Catalonia of Taylorism, statistical analysis, and the methods of the German historical school in social sciences.

However, he is best remembered for his stint as the secretary and treasurer of the Spanish football club RCD Espanyol, from which he played a key role in the signing of Ricardo Zamora. He was also president of the Catalan Football Federation and worked as a football referee.

== Early life and education ==
Tallada was born in Barcelona on 9 July 1884, as the son of Rafael Tallada i Oliveres and Fernanda Paulí i Galceran, both from Tortosa. He completed degrees in law and industrial engineering at the University of Barcelona in 1908, and was later awarded with a scholarship in 1911.

== Political and social career ==
His political activity was always oriented towards regionalism, and in 1909, the 25-year-old Tallada already was the president of the Joventut Nacionalista, the youth branch/wing of the Regionalist League of Catalonia. During the Second Spanish Republic, Tallada was a deputy in the Parliament of Catalonia for the Regionalist League, but then during the Spanish Civil War, he joined the nationalist party, FET y de las JONS.

In 1909, Tallada was appointed the first-ever director of Museu Social, which was established by the Barcelona Provincial Council in order to deal with the workers' labor problems and their professional training to respond to industrial demands; the secretary was Josep Ruiz i Castellà and the librarian was Cebrià de Montoliu. Under his leadership, Museu Social organized exhibitions, conferences, courses, a statistics service, and created a job exchange in 1911, the first Catalan cooperative of cheap houses (1911), and the Secretariat of Learning (1915), an entity that would evolve towards the formation of an Institute of Professional Orientation (1919). This institution disappeared around 1920.

He also actively participated in supporting the municipal reform promoted by the Maura Government, organizing a Congress of Municipal Government in Barcelona in 1909.

== Academic career ==
Since the beginning, Tallada participated in the organization of the culture built by the Commonwealth of Catalonia, first as director of the socio-economic institution Museu Social, financed by the Barcelona Provincial Council, and then as professor of Social Economy at both the School of Local Administration of Catalonia (founded in 1914) and the School of Advanced Commercial Studies (1918).

During the Second Republic, Tallada was a professor of law and economic sciences at the Autonomous University of Barcelona, and in the 1937–38 academic year, in the middle of the Civil War, he was a professor at the University of Salamanca. After the war, he returned to Barcelona, where he held the class of Political Economy at the Faculty of Law at the University of Barcelona.

== Sporting career ==
Beyond his teaching work, Tallada was the secretary and treasurer of RCD Espanyol during the presidency of José Gaspar Hardoy. Under Hardoy, the club achieved positive results both off and on the field, reaching the final of the 1915 Copa del Rey against Athletic Bilbao, but despite some encouraging first steps in the white club, it was possibly the fact of losing the 1915 Cup final that caused a convulsive situation within the entity that led to some of its members to call for new elections in November 1915, in which José María Bernadas was elected president.

In April 1916, Tallada, then the club's treasurer, negotiated and reached a loan agreement with Universitari SC for their 15-year-old goalkeeper Ricardo Zamora, thus playing a key role in helping Espanyol sign this future legendary figure in Spanish football. He then visited Zamora's parents to ask them for permission to let their son travel to Madrid by train for a friendly match against Madrid FC, which they declined, so Tallada insisted and eventually convinced them after promising them that he would also go and take care of the boy, who thus made his debut for Espanyol on 19 April.

Tallada also briefly worked as a referee, overseeing only two matches in the Catalan championship, the first on 4 May 1913, between Polo and University SC (1–1), and the second on 24 October 1915, between FC Barcelona and FC Internacional, which ended in a 5–0 win for the former. He also presided over the Catalan Football Federation in 1914–15, replacing Narciso Deop and then being replaced by Ricardo Cabot.

== Economic career ==
Tallada developed his economic activity by directing Crédito & Docks (1924) and later as a director of the Banco de Vizcaya in Barcelona between the second half of the 1920s and the first of the 1930s. Together with other economists (Flores de Lemus, Bernis), he was part of the commission appointed by General Miguel Primo de Rivera to study the possible reestablishment of the gold standard (1929), which he opposed. He was a member of various boards of directors of entities such as the Ateneo Barcelonés, the Chamber of Commerce, and the Association of Bankers of Barcelona.

== Scientific work ==
In collaboration with periodical journals, Tallada wrote a large number of articles; his scientific work can be divided into three chronological and thematic stages. The first focuses on social and demographic issues, with far outdated concepts: For instance, along with Miquel Vidal, Manuel Reventós, Cebrià de Montoliu, and Josep Ruiz i Castellà, he is considered the introducer of the scientific study of society, according to the methodology of the German Historical School. The second was dedicated to the study of economic organization, and in fact, in 1931, Tallada founded the Catalan Union of Economic Studies. The third stage was nourished by various studies on political economy, in which he analyzed economic systems and their relationship with contemporary politics.

As an economic historian, Tallada developed his research in three fields that converged at different times: The first was the Catalan economy and "the political-economic ideas of Catalonia", in the 19th and first third of the 20th centuries. The second field of research was the cyclical evolution of contemporary capitalism, with special attention to crises (La crisi d’una civilització, 1935), in which he studied the Great Depression and its effects, and the economic and monetary consequences of the two world wars, which led him, like many economic historians, to prospective proposals, such as the "rationalization" of standard industrial work. In this sense, his 1922 work L’organització científica de la indústria (The Scientific Organization of Industry) introduced Taylorism to Catalonia. The third field was the analysis of various historical alternative proposals to capitalism, such as the Proudhonian socialism of the 19th century and the Soviet socialism of the 20th century (L’organització econòmica de la Rússia soviètica, 1935).

Tallada was also the introducer of modern statistical analysis in Catalonia through his 1913 work Anuari d’Estadística Social de Catalunya (Annual of Social Statistics of Catalonia), and author of the pioneering study in Catalonia on the labor movement through his 1911 work El moviment social durant el segle xix (The Social Movement during the 19th Century). In September 1924, he published a work about the depreciation of the peseta in Revista de Catalunya.

== Demographic career ==
In 1918, Tallada published Demografia de Catalunya (Demographics of Catalonia), which was one of the first modern treatises on the Catalan population. During his years as director of the Museu Social, Tallada coordinated important research and projects, such as an ambitious housing plan for the city of Barcelona that sought to respond to the enormous demographic changes derived from the increase in population.

== Death ==
After a long illness, Tallada died at his home in Barcelona on 1 July 1946, at the age of 61, and was buried in the Cemetery of Montjuïc (group 3a, minor tomb 561).

== Works ==
- El moviment social durant el segle xix, 1911
- Anuari d’Estadística Social de Catalunya, 1913
- Las cooperativas de producción y de consumo, 1915
- Les doctrines de P. J. Proudhom, 1918
- Demografia de Catalunya, 1918
- L’organització científica de la indústria, 1922
- Moneda y Crédito, 1926
- La desinflació monetària, 1930
- Imprenta de la Casa Provincial de Caritat, 1930
- Les crisis econòmiques, 1931
- El comercio y la industria de Cataluña y la solidaridad económica nacional, 1934
- La crisi d’una civilització, 1934
- L’organització econòmica de la Rússia soviètica, 1935
- La política económica en los tiempos de crisis: cursillo profesado en la Universidad de Salamanca durante el ejercicio académico 1937-1938, 1940
- Técnica y Economía, 1942
- Barcelona económica y financiera, 1944
- El ciclo económico y el paro forzoso, 1945
- Historia de las finanzas españolas en el siglo xix, 1946
- La guerra económica, 1948
  - Note: All of these works were published in Barcelona, sept for the last two, which were published in Madrid.
