= Ardura (surname) =

Ardura is a Spanish surname. Notable people with the surname include:

- Josep Maria Rodríguez i Ardura (born 1946), Catalan footballer
- Bernard Ardura (born 1948), French Catholic priest, professor, philosopher, theologian, and author
- Rafael Bermudo Ardura (1881–1936), French farmer, municipal official, and socialist politician
- Alfonso Ardura (1876–1934), Spanish soldier, politician, and sports leader
- Trinidad Ardura (1869–1937), Spanish writer
- Ramón Azorín Ardura (died 1939), industrialist and mayor of Carabanchel.
- Manuel García Ardura (born 1866), Spanish mathematician and special schools professor. Authored mathematics textbooks, some of which were declared of public interest for military schools.
