= Eduardo Corrons =

Spanish designer

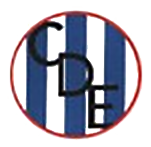
- The crest of RCD Espanyol that Corrons designed
- Born: Eduard Corrons; Catalonia, Spain
- Died: Spain
- Citizenship: Spanish
- Occupations: Designer; Football socio
- Known for: Designer of the crest of RCD Espanyol

Eduardo Corrons was a Spanish designer, who was the number one member of football club RCD Espanyol for many years. He is best known for choosing the club's current colours, blue and white, and subsequently designing the club's crest (1910) that preceded the current one.

== Biography ==
Little is known about Corrons' life; at some point before 1910, he became a member of RCD Espanyol, whose flag initially had the colours of the Spanish flag (mostly yellow). At the club's general Assembly of 20 February 1910, Corrons proposed to change the club's colours to white and blue, which had been the colours appearing on the shield of the great catalonian Admiral Roger de Lluria, who sailed the Mediterranean protecting the interests of the Crown of Aragon in the Middle Ages; furthermore, the official foundation of the club was signed in a premises on Roger de Llúria street itself, which might have influenced Corrons' own decision. Corrons chose Lluria's colours as a means to express the adventurous spirit of Espanyol and, at the same time, summarise the love it professed for its land and its traditions. The proposal was accepted unanimously and from that moment on, the Espanyol shirts have been white with large vertical blue bands, while Corrons himself designed the club's new crest in 1910, with blue and white as its central colours and with the caption Club Deportivo Español. The blue and white kit was first worn in two international friendly matches played against Stade Bordelais and Cardiff Corinthians.

Two years later, on 24 April 1912, King Alfonso XIII granted the title of "Real" to the club, so Corrons modified the crest again by incorporating the crown on the circle, and widening the red border of the same to fit the letters Real Club Deportivo Español, and therefore, the blue stripes on a white background would no longer be oriented vertically, but rather in an inclined manner.

He later became the club's Number One member for many years.

== Legacy ==
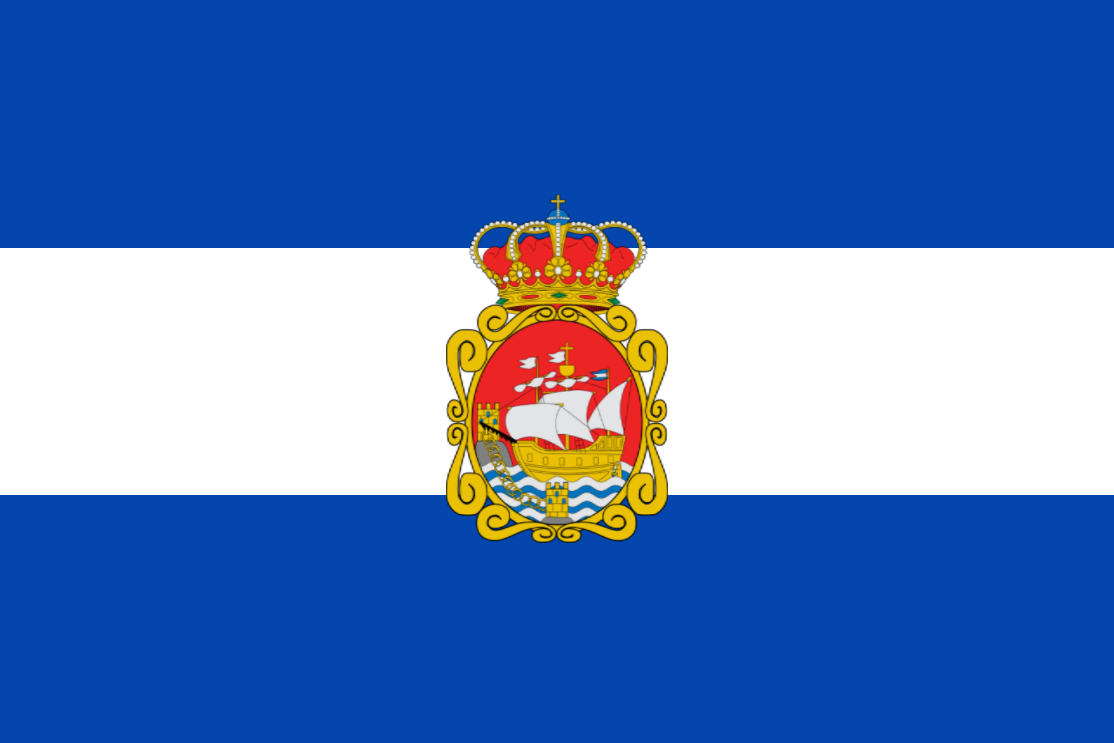
The flag of Avilés

In the early 1920s, Eusebio Fernández Muñiz used the power that he had as the vice-president of RCD Espanyol to contact the company that made the club's shirts and then purchased and acquired a set of them, brought from Barcelona, for the local club of his native Avilés, Stadium Club Avilesino. This club, with its new blue and white flag, quickly become a very popular entity among the town's residents, to the point that the municipal authorities ended up adopting the same colors for the Avilés flag to live up to the feeling they had towards the football club. Besides Stadium Avilesino, which later became Real Avilés CF, other clubs in the town have been using these colors in their clothing as a symbol of local sentiment, such as CF Carbayedo or Belenos RC.
