= Jan Peries =

Spanish footballer (born 2007)

Personal information
- Full name: Jan Peries Durán
- Date of birth: 11 April 2007 (age 19)
- Place of birth: Balaguer, Spain
- Height: 1.75 m (5 ft 9 in)
- Position: Attacking midfielder

Team information
- Current team: Espanyol B
- Number: 10

Youth career
- Balaguer
- 2018–2025: Espanyol

Senior career*
Years	Team	Apps	(Gls)
2024–	Espanyol B	46	(3)
2026–	Espanyol	1	(0)
- * Club domestic league appearances and goals as of 1 November 2026

Jan Peries Durán (born 11 April 2007) is a Spanish professional footballer who plays as an attacking midfielder for RCD Espanyol B.

== Career ==
Born in Balaguer, Lleida, Catalonia, Peries joined RCD Espanyol's youth sides in 2018, from hometown side CF Balaguer. He renewed his contract with the club on 7 February 2024, and made his senior debut with the reserves on 22 March of the following year, starting in a 2–1 Segunda Federación away loss to Valencia CF Mestalla.

Peries subsequently established himself as a regular starter for the B's, and further extended his link with the Pericos until 2028 on 1 December 2025. He made his professional – and La Liga – debut the following 30 October, coming on as a late substitute for fellow debutant Alejandro Santiago in a 1–0 away win over Villarreal CF.
