= Victoriano de la Riva =

Spanish footballer and sports leader

Personal information
- Full name: Victoriano de la Riva Ruiz
- Birth name: Victorià de la Riva i Ruiz
- Date of birth: 9 April 1878
- Place of birth: Barcelona, Catalonia, Spain
- Date of death: 16 January 1930 (aged 51)
- Place of death: Madrid, Spain
- Position: Forward

Senior career*
Years	Team	Apps	(Gls)
1903–1905	RCD Espanyol		
President of RCD Espanyol
In office 1919–1920
Preceded by	Manuel Allende
Succeeded by	Genaro de la Riva
President of RCD Espanyol
In office 1922–1924
Preceded by	Eusebio Fernández Muñiz
Succeeded by	Santiago de la Riva
- * Club domestic league appearances and goals

Victoriano de la Riva Ruiz (9 April 1878 – 16 January 1930) was a Spanish footballer who played as a forward for RCD Espanyol. He was one of the most important figures in the history of RCD Espanyol, both as a player and President of the club, serving as the latter on two occasions (1919–20, 1922–24). His brothers Genaro and Santiago were also presidents of RCD Espanyol, doing so on three occasions, a society that the three la Riva brothers presided for many years, paying for and maintaining the economy of the club mostly from their own pocket.

== Early life ==
Victoriano de la Riva was born on 9 April 1878 in Barcelona as the son of Victorià de la Riva, a natural from Ortigosa de Cameros, and Jacinta Ruiz Alonso, he was born to one of the richest families in Catalonia.

== Playing career ==
Riva began his football career at his hometown club Espanyol in 1903, at the age of 25, and together with Ángel Ponz, Gustavo Green, Emilio Sampere, and the three Joaquins (Escardó, Carril, and García), he was part of the team that won the first edition of the Catalan championship in 1903–04. He remained loyal to the club until 1905, when Español had to suspend its activities due to a lack of players since most of them were university students who enrolled to study at universities outside Catalonia in the 1905–06 academic year. In total, he played 14 official matches with the club, all in the Catalan championship.

== Club presidency ==
Riva was president of Espanyol in two different periods, 1919–20 and 1922–24, and both were very insignificant, being replaced by his younger brother Genaro in 1920. In the early 1920s, Espanyol was enduring one of the worst moments in its history due to an eviction order for the non-payment of the Camp del carrer Muntaner, Espanyol's football field at the time, but the la Riva brothers saved the entity from its disappearance by provided the money for the purchase of the lands and grounds in Can Ràbia for 170,000 pesetas (about 1,000 euros) in which the Sarrià Stadium was constructed and opened in 1923.

The brothers Victoriano and Santiago were partners of FC Barcelona in the 1912–13 season and then presided over the white-and-blue club in a total of 5 different stages.

Riva was also president of the Cercle del Liceu. He was a sports enthusiast since his beginnings and always offered his loyal support for as many events as were required.

== Death ==
Riva died in Barcelona on 16 January 1930, at the age of 51.

== Honours ==
RCD Espanyol

- Catalan championship:
  - Champions (1): 1903–04
