= Cenarro =

Cenarro is a Spanish surname. Notable people with the surname include:

- Ángela Cenarro Lagunas (born 1965), Spanish feminist and historian
- Francisco Román Cenarro (1902–1969), Spanish sports leader
- Joaquín García Cenarro (1875–?), Spanish footballer
- Severo Cenarro (1853–1898), Spanish medical lieutenant colonel
