= Juanjo Díaz =

Spanish football manager (1949–2017)

Personal information
- Full name: Juan José Díaz Gallana
- Date of birth: 8 January 1949
- Place of birth: Ciudad Real, Spain
- Date of death: 6 December 2017 (aged 68)
- Place of death: Terrassa, Spain

Managerial career
- Years: Team
- Muntanyesa
- Espanyol (youth)
- Menorca
- Espanyol (youth)
- 1987–1990: Hospitalet
- 1990: Español
- 1990–1991: Mollerussa
- 1991–1993: Palamós
- 1993: Español
- 1994–1995: Valladolid B
- 1995–1996: Huesca
- 1996–1997: Andorra
- 1998–2000: Águilas
- 2000–2001: Cornellà
- 2001: Cartagena
- 2001: Badajoz

Juan José "Juanjo" Díaz Galiana (8 January 1949 – 6 December 2017), sometimes known simply as Juanjo, was a Spanish football manager.

== Career ==
RCD Espanyol appointed the little-known Diaz to replace Benito Joanet in January 1990. Diaz would lead Espanyol to the 1989–90 Segunda División play-offs, where the club won promotion following a victory over CD Málaga. He left the club immediately after the play-offs.

In June 2001 Juanjo was named as manager of second-division side CD Badajoz. That October, however, he was relieved of his duties after winning only two points out of a possible 27.

He died in Terrassa, Catalonia, at the age of 68, following a long illness.
