= Genaro de la Riva =

Spanish footballer and sports manager

President of RCD Espanyol
- In office 1920–1922
- Preceded by: Victorià de la Riva
- Succeeded by: Eusebio Fernández Muñiz

President of RCD Espanyol
- In office 1925–1930
- Preceded by: Santiago de la Riva
- Succeeded by: Santiago de la Riva

President of RCD Espanyol
- In office 1933–1942
- Preceded by: Javier de Salas
- Succeeded by: Francisco Román Cenarro

Personal details
- Born: 9 September 1890 Barcelona, Catalonia, Spain
- Died: 25 February 1968 (aged 77) Vera, Andalusia, Spain
Association football career
- Full name: Genaro de la Riva Ruiz
- Position: Midfielder
Senior career*
Years	Team	Apps	(Gls)
1911–1912	RCD Espanyol		
1913–1916	Polo JC		
International career
1912	Catalonia	1	(1)
- * Club domestic league appearances and goals

Genaro de la Riva Ruiz (9 September 1890 - 25 February 1968) was a Spanish athlete who performed several modalities such as foil, sailing, cricket, field hockey and footballer who played as a midfielder for RCD Espanyol and Catalonia. He was one of the most important figures in the history of RCD Espanyol, both as a player and President of the club, serving as the latter on three separate occasions (1920–22, 1925–30 and 1933–42) for a total of 16 years at the helm of the club. His brothers Victorià and Santiago were also presidents of RCD Espanyol, a society that the three la Riva brothers presided for many years, paying for and maintaining the economy of the club mostly from their own pocket.

== Club career ==
Born in Barcelona as the son of Victorià de la Riva, a natural from Ortigosa de Cameros, and Jacinta Ruiz i Alonso, he was born to one of the most richest family in Catalonia, Genaro went to study spinning and weaving abroad at the age of just 17, one year in France, one in Belgium (where he was the school's foil champion) and one in England. It was on the latter where he was introduced to football and began developing an interest for the growing sport. Returning to Barcelona in 1910, aged 20, he played in the first team of RCD Espanyol between 1911 and 1912, as a midfielder, helping his team to an unexpected triumph in the 1911–12 Catalan championship, thus interrupting a three-year winning streak of FC Barcelona.

He then joined Polo JC in 1913, where he played cricket and field hockey and where he was the champion of Spain.

== International career ==
Like many other RCD Espanyol players of that time, de la Riva was eligible to play for the Catalonia national team, earning one cap in a friendly against France on 1 December 1912, in which he clutched the game's only goal in a 1–0 win.

== Club presidency ==
He was president of Espanyol on three different periods, 1920–1922, 1925–1930 and 1933–1942. When he took over the club for the first time in 1920, Espanyol was enduring one of the worst moment in its history, due to the departures of Ricardo Zamora and Clemente Gràcia to Barcelona and José Luis Zabala to Oviedo, all of which in 1919, not to mention the casualties of players who had been recruited to fight in the Rif War (1921–26). But the biggest problem was an eviction order for the non-payment of the Muntaner street field, Espanyol’s football field at the time. It is said that around this time, la Riva had to listen in a barbershop how a client proclaimed: "I think Espanyol is definitely dead." The one who said it turned out to be Joan Gamper, FC Barcelona’s president at the time, to which he replied: "While I live, Espanyol will live”, although this story may be legend rather than fact. Either way, la Riva saved the entity from its disappearance by facing, together with his brothers, the eviction, as they provided the money for the purchase of the lands and grounds in Can Ràbia for 170,000 pesetas (about 1,000 euros) in which the Sarrià Stadium was constructed and opened in 1923, becoming the home of the espanyolistas for more than 70 years until they moved out in 1997. They faced setbacks, however, as the construction company went bankrupt, the stands were unbuilt and the team had to carry out endless tours (among them, a very famous one in America in 1926) to finance the works. This was his main achievement as the president of the club because acquiring their own stadium was a very important step in the club's bid for supremacy in Catalan football. Furthermore, at the end of his first mandate in 1922, la Riva managed to bring Zamora back to the club's ranks after three years at city rivals FC Barcelona.

In his second mandate, la Riva promoted and organized Espanyol’s 1926 tour of South America in an attempt to make the presence of Ricardo Zamora profitable. The club had already failed at doing this with some tours that took the team through the north of Spain, Portugal and the Canary Islands, but this time the project of la Riva, who had become president for the second time just the year before, was much more ambitious, and possibly the most daring adventure in the club’s history at the time. He prepared Espanyol’s tour in great detail, with commitments contracted in advance and with the claim of the presence of the then legendary Ricardo Zamora in goal, and la Riva himself travelled with the group, which consisted of 12 club players and seven more borrowed from other entities, who played matches in Argentina, Uruguay, Chile, Peru and Cuba with attendances as high as 60,000. The tour only ended four months later, and their American tour was such a success that Real Madrid and Barcelona soon emulated it. The benefits of this tour and another subsequent one to Central Europe served to finance the Sarriá grandstand, a venue inaugurated three years earlier.

It was also during his second stint at the helm of the club that Espanyol finally achieved its first Copa del Rey title in 1929 by defeating Real Madrid 2–1 in the final. Approximately 5,000 Espanyol fans travelled to Valencia to see the final, doing so by car, train or boat, and la Riva chartered a Trasmediterránea Company ship on his own to carry about 950 fans who could not afford the travel otherwise. Under la Riva, Espanyol was one of the ten founding clubs of the Spanish League in 1929, and on 10 February, just seven days after winning the 1929 cup final, Espanyol’s Pitus Prat scored the very first goal in the history of the Spanish First Division. His third mandate, which began in 1933, was interrupted by the Spanish Civil War and the seizure of the club by some employees under the tutelage of the General Union of Workers. And after this obligatory parenthesis, he regained his duties of president in 1940, a position he held until 13 May 1942, adding to his record another Copa del Rey title in 1940, the club’s second, and being a finalist in the following year.

During the entire period of his presidency, Espanyol always remained in the highest category of Spanish football. Moreover, the athletics, cycling, rugby, and basketball sections were revitalized. He was also a pioneer of field hockey. In total, he served as the club's president for 16 years. Genaro has been cataloged by many as the best president in the history of the club. When he left the presidency, he remained linked to the club and was partner number 2. His brothers Victorià and Santiago were also presidents of the club.

He was also a director of the Spanish Football Federation. He also presided over the Sant Cugat Golf Club, and, at the end of the Civil War, he headed a group of partners that rebuilt the golf course.

The Catalan Football Federation distinguished him with the Gold Medal for Sports Merit and Espanyol with the club's Gold Medal posthumously.

== Death ==
He died in a traffic accident in February 1968, at the age of 83, along with his sister Mercedes, on a road in the north of Almería.

== Honours ==
=== Club ===
RCD Espanyol

- Catalan championship:
  - Champions (1): 1911–12
