= Santiago de la Riva =

Spanish footballer and sports leader

President of RCD Espanyol
- In office 1912 – 24 July 1913
- Preceded by: José Gaspar Hardoy
- Succeeded by: Alfonso Ardura

President of RCD Espanyol
- In office 1924–1925
- Preceded by: Victorià de la Riva
- Succeeded by: Genaro de la Riva

President of RCD Espanyol
- In office 1930–1931
- Preceded by: Genaro de la Riva
- Succeeded by: Javier de Salas

Personal details
- Born: 17 November 1883 Barcelona, Catalonia, Spain
- Died: 14 December 1955 (aged 72) Madrid, Spain

Santiago de la Riva Ruiz (17 November 1883 – 14 December 1955) was a Spanish sports leader who served as the president of RCD Espanyol on three occasions (1912–13, 1924–25 and 1930–31) for a total of 3 years at the helm of the club. His brothers Victorià and Genaro were also presidents of RCD Espanyol on three occasions, a society that the three la Riva brothers presided for many years, paying for and maintaining the economy of the club mostly from their own pocket.

== Early life ==
Santiago de la Riva was born on 17 November 1883 in Barcelona as the son of Victorià de la Riva, a native of Ortigosa de Cameros, and Jacinta Ruiz Alonso, he was born to one of the richest families in Catalonia.

== Sporting career ==
Riva was 6th president of Espanyol in three different periods, 1912–13, 1924–25, and 1930–31, and during his first mandate in 1912, and thanks to his vice-president Josep Ciudad, Espanyol managed to get King Alfonso XIII to grant the club the title of "Real". Espanyol only removed the crown from its shield during the Second Spanish Republic, and it was Santiago himself who had to carry out the measure. Historian Joan Segura Palomares described him as giving "the image of what he was, a businessman, with a clear idea and entrepreneurial spirit". In March 1912, Espanyol and FC Barcelona agreed to play a charity tournament, the Ciudad-La Riva Cup, named after the presidents of Espanyol, who won both legs for a 5–0 aggregate win.

In 1912, the discussions to decide the venue of the 1913 Copa del Rey ended up causing a split within the Spanish Football Federation, which caused the 1913 edition to have two parallel cup championships, with Espanyol and Barcelona playing in different tournaments. In June 1912, Espanyol incorporated the field hockey section, a sport very little known in Spain at the time. On 24 July 1913, he leaves the presidency and is replaced by Alfonso Ardura.

In the early 1920s, Espanyol was enduring one of the worst moments in its history due to an eviction order for the non-payment of the Camp del carrer Muntaner, Espanyol's football field at the time, but the la Riva brothers saved the entity from its disappearance by provided the money for the purchase of the lands and grounds in Can Ràbia for 170,000 pesetas (about 1,000 euros) in which the Sarrià Stadium was constructed and opened in 1923, during Santiago's second term; however, the de facto president was his brother Genaro, and it can be said that the club was run between the two despite the fact that the chair of the presidency was occupied by Santiago.

When his brother Genaro left the presidency in 1930, it was occupied by Santiago, whose mandate lasted a year until he was replaced by Javier de Salas in 1931. The brothers Victoriano and Santiago were partners of FC Barcelona in the 1912–13 season and then presided over the white-and-blue club in a total of 5 different stages.

== Death ==
Riva died in Madrid on 14 December 1955, at the age of 72.
