= José María Bernadas =

Spanish businessman and sports leader

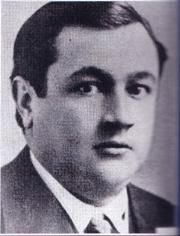
- José María Bernadas
- Born: José María Bernadas Viladesau; 14 April 1886; Rosario, Santa Fe, Argentina
- Died: 12 April 1933 (aged 46); Barcelona, Catalonia, Spain
- Citizenship: Argentinian and Spanish
- Occupations: Businessman; Sports leader
- Known for: President of RCD Espanyol

8th President of RCD Espanyol
- In office 1915–1918
- Preceded by: José Gaspar Hardoy
- Succeeded by: Manuel Allende

José María Bernadas Viladesau (14 April 1886 – 12 April 1933) was a Spanish businessman and sports leader. He was the 8th president of RCD Espanyol between 1915 and 1918.

== Early and personal life ==
Bernadas was born on 14 April 1886 in Rosario, Santa Fe, as the son of Salvador Bernadas and Mercedes Viladesau, natives of Barcelona. At a very early age, he moved to Spain where he lived permanently. In 1914 he married Ana Dublé González, with whom he had six children: Salvador, Ana, Mercedes, María Josefa, Jorge, and Manuel Alberto José Bernadas Dublé.

== Professional career ==
Bernadas had a thriving leather tanning business. In 1926 he moved with his family to Haro where he set up a poultry farm, which was quite successful. Because this farm did not have the land necessary for new facilities, he created a new one in 1929, this time in Miranda de Ebro, Province of Burgos. As a result of the difficult economic situation that Spain was going through during those years, the family businesses began to disappear and only a few pieces of land remained where beets and wheat were mainly grown.

== Presidency of RCD Espanyol ==
Bernadas was appointed as the 8th president of RCD Espanyol in a members' assembly on 1 November 1915, with the support of the previous president José Gaspar Hardoy, Evelio Doncos, and the strong man of the board José Maria Tallada. The position was renewed for him on 18 December 1917, but a few months later he left the presidency when there was a new renewal of the board, being replaced by fellow South American Manuel Allende.

During his leadership, Bernadas maintained the good pace of the team from previous seasons by looking for new values, expanding the club's sports base by creating the athletics section. His most important achievement as president, however, was the signing of a teenager named Ricardo Zamora, since Tallada knew the goalkeeper's family. Zamora proved to be crucial in Espanyol winning the 1917–18 Catalan championship. In 1917, Espanyol denounced FC Barcelona for the improper alignment of Juan Garchitorena, a Filipino player that Barcelona lined up in a handful of games in the Catalan championship, where foreigners cannot participate, thus causing the infamous Garchitorena case, which resulted in the Blaugrana club withdrawing from the competition that was eventually won by Espanyol.

== Death ==
Bernadas died at 3:00 pm in Barcelona on 12 April 1933, just two days before his 47th birthday.
