= Montoliu =

Montoliu may refer to:

- Montoliu de Lleida, municipality in the province of Lleida and autonomous community of Catalonia, Spain
- Montoliu de Segarra, municipality in the province of Lleida and autonomous community of Catalonia, Spain
- Cebrià de Montoliu (1873–1923), Spanish architect, planner, and translator
- Pedro Montoliú (born 1954), Spanish journalist
- Tete Montoliu (1933–1997), Spanish jazz pianist
