= Eusebio Fernández =

Eusebio Fernández may refer to:

- Eusebio Fernández Muñiz (1893–1955), Spanish businessman and president of RCD Espanyol
- Eusebio Fernández Ardavín (1898–1965), Spanish screenwriter and film director
