= RCD Espanyol B =

Spanish football team

Espanyol B
- Full name: Reial Club Deportiu Espanyol de Barcelona S.A.D. "B"
- Nickname: Los Periquitos (The Parakeets)
- Founded: 1991 as Cristenc-Español
- Ground: Ciutat Esportiva Dani Jarque
- Capacity: 3,000
- President: Chen Yasheng
- Head coach: Sergio García
- League: Segunda Federación – Group 2
- 2025–26: Segunda Federación – Group 3, 10th of 18
Home colours	Away colours	Third colours

Reial Club Deportiu Espanyol de Barcelona "B" is the reserve team of the RCD Espanyol, club based in Barcelona, in the autonomous community of Catalonia. The team was founded in 1991 and plays in the Segunda Federación – Group 2, holding home matches at the 3,000-seat capacity Ciutat Esportiva Dani Jarque.

Unlike the English League, reserve teams in Spain play in the same football pyramid as their senior team rather than a separate league. However, reserve teams cannot play in the same division as their senior team and are no longer able to compete in the Copa del Rey.

== History ==
In 1981, the Futbol Club Cristinenc was created in Santa Cristina d'Aro, Province of Girona. The club had a speedy progression through the lower divisions until it reached the fourth division. It had also become a feeder club for the RCD Español.

In 1991 the team changed its denomination to the Cristinenc-Espanyol, being renamed the Real Club Deportivo Espanyol B three years later, while also gaining reserve team status for Espanyol. It fluctuated between the fourth and the third levels in the following decades, the longest spell being five years, with a second position in the 2001–02 season. The Catalan outfit failed to promote during the team's three visits to the playoffs.

In the 2009–10 Espanyol B finished in 16th position, above the relegation zone, and dropped down a division in the relegation playoffs.

== Season to season ==
- As FC Cristinenc

Season	Tier	Division	Place	Copa del Rey
1982–83	8	3ª Reg.		
1983–84	8	3ª Reg.		
1984–85	8	3ª Reg.		
1985–86	7	2ª Reg.	1st	
1986–87	6	1ª Reg.	12th	
1987–88	6	1ª Reg.	1st	

Season	Tier	Division	Place	Copa del Rey
1988–89	5	Reg. Pref.	1st	
1989–90	4	3ª	11th	
1990–91	4	3ª	10th	
1991–92	4	3ª	7th	
1992–93	4	3ª	6th	
1993–94	4	3ª	9th	

- As RCD Espanyol's reserve team

Season	Tier	Division	Place
1994–95	4	3ª	1st
1995–96	3	2ª B	11th
1996–97	3	2ª B	8th
1997–98	3	2ª B	4th
1998–99	3	2ª B	17th
1999–2000	4	3ª	2nd
2000–01	3	2ª B	4th
2001–02	3	2ª B	2nd
2002–03	3	2ª B	10th
2003–04	3	2ª B	11th
2004–05	3	2ª B	18th
2005–06	4	3ª	2nd
2006–07	3	2ª B	13th
2007–08	3	2ª B	18th
2008–09	4	3ª	1st
2009–10	3	2ª B	16th
2010–11	4	3ª	5th
2011–12	4	3ª	2nd
2012–13	3	2ª B	8th
2013–14	3	2ª B	8th

Season	Tier	Division	Place
2014–15	3	2ª B	11th
2015–16	3	2ª B	12th
2016–17	3	2ª B	18th
2017–18	4	3ª	1st
2018–19	3	2ª B	5th
2019–20	3	2ª B	8th
2020–21	3	2ª B	8th / 2nd
2021–22	4	2ª RFEF	2nd
2022–23	4	2ª Fed.	5th
2023–24	4	2ª Fed.	9th
2024–25	4	2ª Fed.	7th
2025–26	4	2ª Fed.	10th
2026–27	4	2ª Fed.	

- 20 seasons in Segunda División B
- 6 seasons in Segunda Federación/Segunda División RFEF
- 12 seasons in Tercera División
- 7 seasons in Categorías Regionales

== Honours ==
- Tercera División: 1994–95, 2008–09, 2017–18

== Players ==
=== Current squad ===
As of 7 September 2026

Note: Flags indicate national team as defined under FIFA eligibility rules; some limited exceptions apply. Players may hold more than one non-FIFA nationality.

No.	Pos.	Nation	Player
1	GK	ESP	Llorenç Serred
2	DF	CHI	Thomas Coulombe
3	DF	ESP	Hugo Caroz
4	DF	ESP	Xavi Rufo
5	DF	FRA	Adama Timera
6	MF	ESP	Ferrán Gómez
8	MF	ESP	Miguel Londoño
9	FW	ESP	Rubén Aguilar
10	FW	ESP	Jan Peries
11	MF	ESP	Alejandro Santiago
12	DF	ESP	Arnau Bargalló
14	DF	ESA	Itzel Colocho
15	DF	ESP	Guille Angulo

No.	Pos.	Nation	Player
16	MF	ESP	Martí Farell
17	MF	ESP	Victor Mullerat
18	MF	ESP	Hugo Crespo
19	FW	ESP	Eloi Tost
20	MF	ESP	Marti Rivas
21	FW	ESP	Jan Moreno
22	DF	ESP	José Ángel López
23	DF	BRA	Lucas Alves
24	MF	ESP	Denis Cruz
30	GK	UKR	Yehor Krapivin
31	GK	ESP	Joel Rodríguez
—	FW	ESP	Pol Rivera

=== Reserve team ===
Note: Flags indicate national team as defined under FIFA eligibility rules; some limited exceptions apply. Players may hold more than one non-FIFA nationality.

No.	Pos.	Nation	Player
26	DF	ESP	Arnau Cases

=== Current technical staff ===
Role	Name
Manager	(Spain) Raúl Jardiel
Assistant manager	(Spain) Pablo Roldán
Fitness coach	(Spain) Borja Esteve
Goalkeeping coach	(Spain) Sergi Pujol
Analyst	(Spain) Gerard Schell
Club doctor	(Spain) Tiago García
Physiotherapist	(Spain) Marc Aristoy
Nutritionist	(Spain) Marc Flo
Delegate	(Spain) Rafa Alba
Kit man	(Spain) Javi Peña

== Notable players ==
Note: This list includes players that have appeared in at least 100 top league games and/or have reached international status.

- (Andorra) Ildefons Lima
- (Cameroon) Kévin Soni
- (Chad) Azrack Mahamat
- (Republic of the Congo) Thievy Bifouma
- (Democratic Republic of the Congo) Hérita Ilunga
- (Equatorial Guinea) Juvenal Edjogo Owono
- (Equatorial Guinea) Jacinto Elá
- (Equatorial Guinea) Jordan Gutiérrez
- (The Gambia) Bacari
- (Hong Kong) Jordi Tarrés
- (Indonesia) Arthur Irawan
- (Indonesia) Jordi Amat
- (Ivory Coast) Eric Bailly
- (Morocco) Zouhair Feddal
- (Netherlands) Marvin Zeegelaar
- (Nigeria) Kalu Uche
- (Portugal) Rui Fonte
- (Spain) Raúl Baena
- (Spain) Alberto de la Bella
- (Spain) Marc Bertrán
- (Spain) Joan Capdevila
- (Spain) Kiko Casilla
- (Spain) Javi Chica
- (Spain) Carlos Clerc
- (Spain) Ferran Coro
- (Spain) Albert Crusat
- (Spain) Sergi Darder
- (Spain) Rubén Duarte
- (Spain) David García
- (Spain) Jordi Gómez
- (Spain) Sergio González
- (Spain) Moisés Hurtado
- (Spain) Gorka Iraizoz
- (Spain) Daniel Jarque
- (Spain) Joan Jordán
- (Spain) Pol Lirola
- (Spain) David López
- (Spain) Javi López
- (Spain) Pau López
- (Spain) Alberto Lopo
- (Spain) Quique de Lucas
- (Spain) Pablo Maffeo
- (Spain) Javi Márquez
- (Spain) Aarón Martín
- (Spain) Óscar Melendo
- (Spain) Ángel Morales
- (Spain) Javi Puado
- (Spain) Marc Roca
- (Spain) Víctor Ruiz
- (Spain) Bruno Saltor
- (Spain) Sergio Sánchez
- (Spain) Antonio Soldevilla
- (Spain) Raúl Tamudo
- (Spain) Cristian Tello
- (Spain) Marc Torrejón
- (Spain) Álvaro Vázquez
- (Spain) Dídac Vilà
