= Manuel Allende =

Uruguayan businessman and sports leader

- Born: Manuel Allende Riverós; 8 March 1887; Salto Department, Uruguay
- Died: 10 August 1944 (aged 57); Lloret de Mar, Catalonia, Spain
- Citizenship: Spanish
- Occupations: Businessman; Sports leader
- Known for: 14th president of RCD Espanyol

9th President of RCD Espanyol
- In office 1918–1919
- Preceded by: José María Bernadas
- Succeeded by: Victorià de la Riva

Manuel Allende Riverós (8 March 1887 – 10 August 1944) was a Uruguayan businessman and sports leader. He was the 9th president of RCD Espanyol between 1918 and 1919. On a professional level, he was a maritime merchant who became rich during the First World War by transporting groceries across the Atlantic Ocean, thanks to a fleet of more than 70 ships.

== Professional career ==
During the First World War, Allende founded an important merchant fleet with more than 70 units, for the transportation of supplies from Spanish America, especially Argentina and Uruguay, to Spain. Later, he moved to the latter, where his commercial operations were guaranteed by different banking establishments, but when the Armistice of 11 November 1918 occurred, unexpectedly, Allende suffered such a tremendous economic collapse that he was ruined along with his family collaborators. In recognition of his efforts to promote commercial relations between Uruguay and other South American countries with Spain, the Spanish Government awarded him the Grand Cross of Naval Merit in 1919.

Allende was the founder of the Madrid newspaper El Fígaro (1918–1920), appointing the Catalan textile industrialist José María de Boét and his brother, Andrés Boét, to the management. He also founded and financed the literary magazine Cosmópolis (1919–1922). He founded the Allende Insurance Company, located at Plaça de Catalunya, no. 7 in Barcelona.

== Presidency of RCD Espanyol ==
Allende was appointed as the 9th president of RCD Espanyol in the meeting of 6 June 1918, replacing José María Bernadas. In both South America and in Spain, he practiced several sports, especially football, to the point of being classified in Uruguay as an international player. Under his leadership, he created the athletics section of the RCD Espanyol in 1918 and was part of the council superior of the Catalan Athletics Federation.

His mandate was marked by a very tense political-social situation since at the end of the war, the controversy over the autonomy of Catalonia intensified, generating demonstrations against the monarchy. All of this triggered an anti-Catalanist campaign on the one hand and pro-independence on the other. The radicalization created an unfortunate atmosphere among the supporters of RCD Espanyol and the club was the target of strong attacks for the mere fact of bearing the name it bore. Because of this situation, in the middle of June 1919, the La Riva family returned to the management of the club, this time in the person of Victorià de la Riva as the new president.

== Death ==
Despite being born and raised in Uruguay, Allende was always a great friend of Spain, expressing his affection on repeated occasions. During his later years, he resided in Barcelona. He then moved to a clinic in Lloret de Mar, due to having contracted a serious illness, which led to fears of the fatal outcome that eventually occurred. Allende died in Lloret de Mar on 10 August 1944, at the age of 57. When the death occurred, the Consul General of Uruguay in Barcelona, Alberto Montalbo de León, took charge of the body of Allende, presiding over the funeral obsequies. Although he had some relatives in Uruguay, it was his wish to be buried in a pantheon in the Lloret de Mar Cemetery, instead of being transferred to his country.
