= José Gaspar Hardoy =

Spanish businessman and sports leader

- Born: José Gaspar Hardoy Tizol; 1865; San Juan, Puerto Rico
- Died: 24 January 1924 (aged 58–59); Barcelona, Catalonia, Spain
- Citizenship: Spanish
- Occupations: sports leader; businessman
- Known for: 5th President of RCD Espanyol

President of RCD Espanyol
- In office 1911–1912
- Preceded by: Evelio Doncos
- Succeeded by: Santiago de la Riva

President of RCD Espanyol
- In office 1914–1915
- Preceded by: Alfonso Ardura
- Succeeded by: José Maria Bernadas

José Gaspar Hardoy Tizol (1865 – 24 January 1924) was a Spanish businessman who served as the 5th president of RCD Espanyol in 1911 and 1912, and then again in 1914 and 1915.

== Professional career ==
Hardoy was born in 1865 in San Juan, Puerto Rico. He was a cordial and energetic man. On a professional level, he was a dentist and he had a dental office at La Rambla, Barcelona. On 4 July 1908, the issue of the Spanish newspaper La Vanguardia, a warning regarding him was written as follows: "Dr. Hardoy Tizol, dental surgeon, begs his clients who have started work to finish it, since he will only remain until 1 August, arranging his return from Paris and London with new equipment and materials".

== Presidencies of RCD Espanyol ==
In 1911, Hardoy was appointed as the fifth president of RCD Espanyol, replacing Evelio Doncos. He left the position for professional reasons, but was part of the board as first vice-president of his successor Santiago de la Riva, and again in the subsequent boards of directors.

In 1914, Hardoy was elected president for a second time, and this time he replaced Alfonso Ardura. In doing so, he became just the second men to preside over Espanyol on two separate occasions, only behind the club founder, Ángel Rodríguez.

It was under his second mandate that the politician José Maria Tallada joined the board, a member who would be of great importance to the club as the president of the Catalan Football Federation. In addition to these positive results off the field, the team also achieved sporting success inside the lines, reaching the final of the 1915 Copa del Rey against Athletic Bilbao, in which a Basque referee was designated, which caused Hardoy to protest the partisanship of the Spanish Football Federation, which had called Espanyol a polemical club. Finally, the referee was replaced by a Swiss living in Irún, Walter Hermann. This ended up being a shot on the foot since Hermann gave a penalty right away in the 4th minute, which was converted by Pichichi, who went on to score a hat-trick to help his side to a 5–0 victory over Espanyol.

Despite some encouraging first steps in the white club, it was possibly the fact of losing the 1915 Cup final that caused a convulsive situation within the entity that led to some of its members to call for new elections in November 1915, in which José Maria Bernadas was elected president.

Hardoy was initially believed to have been named José García Hardoy, a mistake that has persisted through time until David Tolo, the club's historian, published a book of more than 800 pages titled Historia del RCD Espanyol 1900-2021 (History of RCD Espanyol 1900–2021) in March 2022, which included new breakthrough information, such as the discovery of a new president, Eusebio Fernández Muñiz, or the rectification of another like Hardoy, whose name was actually even more morbid: Josep Gaspar Hardoy.

== Death ==
Hardoy died in Barcelona on 24 January 1924, at the age of 58 or 59 years old.
