= Daniel Jarque =

Spanish footballer (1983–2009)

Dani Jarque
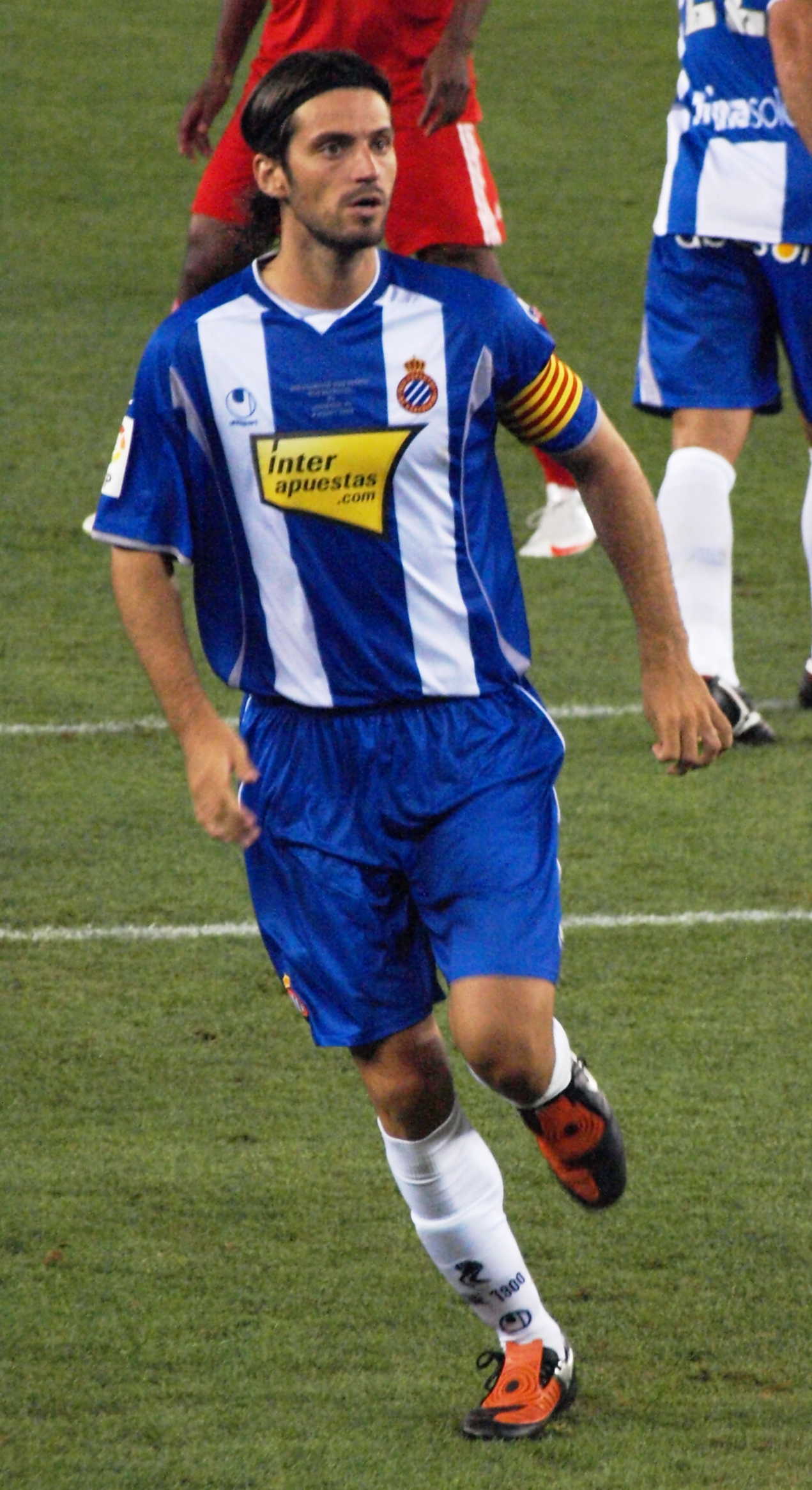
- Jarque with Espanyol in 2009

Personal information
- Full name: Daniel Jarque González
- Date of birth: 1 January 1983
- Place of birth: Barcelona, Spain
- Date of death: 8 August 2009 (aged 26)
- Place of death: Florence, Italy
- Height: 1.85 m (6 ft 1 in)
- Position: Centre-back

Youth career
- Cooperativa
- 1995–2001: Espanyol

Senior career*
Years	Team	Apps	(Gls)
2001–2004	Espanyol B	82	(1)
2002–2009	Espanyol	173	(8)
Total		255	(9)

International career
2001	Spain U17	4	(0)
2001–2002	Spain U19	10	(1)
2003	Spain U20	3	(0)
2003–2005	Spain U21	19	(3)
- * Club domestic league appearances and goals

Daniel Jarque González (1 January 1983 – 8 August 2009) was a Spanish professional footballer who played as a central defender and spent his entire career with Espanyol. He was named team captain one month before his death from a heart attack at the age of 26.

== Club career ==
Born in Barcelona, Catalonia, and a product of local Espanyol's youth system, Jarque made his La Liga debut with his hometown club on 20 October 2002, in a match against Recreativo de Huelva in 2002–03. After only 15 appearances over two seasons, he went on to become a defensive mainstay for a team that won the 2006 edition of the Copa del Rey. On 18 September 2005, he scored the game's only goal to help the hosts defeat Real Madrid.

In 2006–07, after renewing his contract until 2009, Jarque appeared in 14 UEFA Cup games as Espanyol reached the final, lost on penalties to Sevilla. In the previous league campaign, he contributed four league goals as the Pericos finished 15th.

Jarque relieved Raúl Tamudo of his captain duties at the start of 2009–10. He totalled 212 matches for his only club, scoring ten times.

== Death and tributes ==
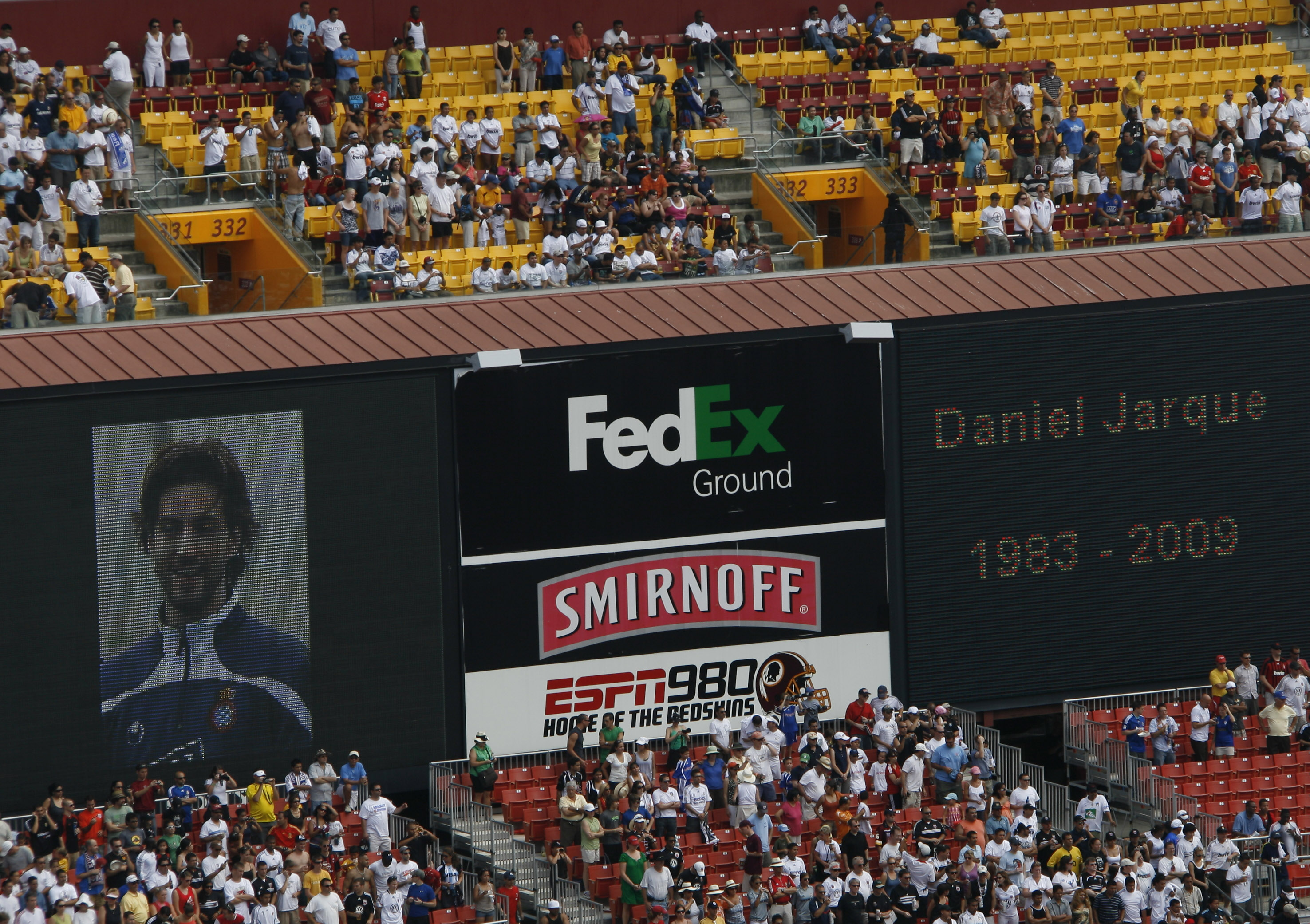
Tribute to Jarque during a friendly between D.C. United and Real Madrid at FedExField on 9 August 2009

According to several online Spanish newspapers, Jarque was found dead during Espanyol's pre-season in the Centro Tecnico Federale di Coverciano near Florence, Italy. On 8 August 2009, he was on the phone with his girlfriend in the team hotel when he suffered a heart attack. Some other news sources say that Jarque's girlfriend, who was seven months into her pregnancy, reported his absence to his roommate Coro.

On 15 August 2009, Arsenal player Cesc Fàbregas, a former teammate of Jarque in the Spain under-21 side, dedicated his second goal in his team's 6–1 Premier League win at Everton to him by raising a shirt with his name and number (#21, which he wore mainly as a professional). The homage was again paid the following month – as Espanyol won the first match at their new Estadi Cornellà-El Prat – against Málaga – by 2–1 scorer Iván Alonso, as Jarque's pregnant girlfriend was also giving birth to the couple's daughter.

On 11 July 2010, Jarque's close friend Andrés Iniesta celebrated his 116th-minute winner in the FIFA World Cup final by removing his jersey to reveal an undershirt with the sentence "Dani Jarque siempre con nosotros" ("Dani Jarque, always with us"). Two years later, after Spain won UEFA Euro 2012, Fàbregas again donned a T-shirt during the trophy celebrations to remember him.

The Espanyol training ground and B-team stadium was also renamed in Jarque's memory.

== Honours ==
Espanyol

- Copa del Rey: 2005–06
- UEFA Cup runner-up: 2006–07
- Supercopa de España runner-up: 2006

Spain U19

- UEFA European Under-19 Championship: 2002

== See also ==
- List of one-club men
- List of association football players who died during their careers
