= Josep Espada =

Spanish footballer and manager (1912–1989)

Personal information
- Full name: Josep Espada i Virgós
- Date of birth: 7 June 1912
- Place of birth: Palafrugell, Catalonia, Spain
- Date of death: 7 October 1989 (aged 77)
- Place of death: Barcelona, Catalonia, Spain
- Position: Midfielder

Youth career
- 1926–1928: Palafrugell

Senior career*
Years	Team	Apps	(Gls)
1928–1934	Palafrugell		
1934–1937	Espanyol		
1940	UE Llevant-Gimnàstic		
1940–1943	Girona		
1943–1945	Espanyol		
1944–1945	→ Constància (on loan)		
1945–1947	Reus Deportiu		

International career
1934–1935	Catalonia	4	(0)

Managerial career
- 1947–1949: Espanyol
- 1949–1951: CD Alcoyano
- 1951–1952: Granada
- 1952–1953: Girona
- 1955–1957: Espanyol
- 1957–1959: Tenerife
- 1959–1961: Terrassa
- 1961–1962: Club León
- 1966: Espanyol
- 1969–70: Olot
- * Club domestic league appearances and goals

Josep Espada Virgós (7 June 1912 – 7 October 1989) was a Spanish footballer who played as a midfielder for Palafrugell and Espanyol. He was also international with the Catalan national team during the 1930s.

After retiring, he became a coach, taking charge of the likes of Espanyol, Granada, Girona, and Terrassa.

== Playing career ==
=== Club career ===
Born on 7 June 1912 in Palafrugell, Espada began playing football in the youth ranks of his hometown club FC Palafrugell in 1926, aged 14, before making his senior debut two years later, in 1928. He stayed loyal to Palafrugell for six years, playing in the first-tier Catalan championship in the early 1930s. He soon stood out as a right midfielder, thanks to his great skill and dribbling, thus becoming a highly valued player sought after by the big clubs, including FC Barcelona, but in the end, however, he signed for Espanyol, remaining there until the outbreak of the Spanish Civil War in 1936.

After the War, Espada played for Levante-Gimnástico (1940) and Girona FC (1940–43), before returning to Espanyol for two more seasons between 1943 and 1945. In total, he played 103 official matches for Espanyol, including 9 goals in 49 La Liga games.

In 1944, Espanyol decided to loan him to CE Constància, where he was relegated to the Tercera Division, and then in 1945, they loaned him to Reus Deportiu as a player-coach, where he would keep a close eye on promising players such as Abraham Carnicero, Antonio Segarra, Diego, and José Artigas, all of whom ended up in the first Espanyol team.

=== International career ===
On 29 June 1934, Espada made his debut for the Catalan national team in a charity match against Athletic Bilbao, scoring once to help his side to a 5–1 win. During this match, Espada's performance impressed Oliveras de la Riva, who took him to Espanyol. A few months later, on 1 January 1935, Espada started for Espanyol in a match against Catalonia, scoring a late equalizer to seal a 3–3 draw.

== Managerial career ==
As a coach, Espada managed Espanyol on three separate occasions, for two seasons in 1947–49, followed by a further two seasons in 1955–57, this time as the second-in-command of Ricardo Zamora. On the latter occasion, he was appointed in a desperate attempt to escape relegation, which came down to the last matchday against CD Málaga at La Rosaleda, with Espanyol only needing to win, but they drew instead (1–1), thus relegating Espanyol to a promotion play-off played over two rounds that measured 6 teams, the last two of La Liga and the best four of the Segunda División. Despite this failure, the club's president decided to keep Espada on the bench, but provide him with a very special assistant: Zamora, and this decision was a complete success as they won the 1954–55 promotion play-off, thus remaining in the Spanish top division. Two years later, they Espada and Zamora guided Espanyol to the final of the 1957 Copa del Generalísimo, which ended in a 1–0 loss to Barcelona.

Besides Espanyol, Espada also coached the likes of CD Alcoyano (1949–51), Granada (1951–52), Girona (1952–53), and Terrassa (1957–59). The president of the latter, General Lorenzo Machado, never trusted Espada, so on the occasion of a triple trip to Cádiz, Jerez, and Córdoba, and after losing the first game, Machado ordered Antonio Perera to travel to Andalusia with "very precise instructions" about the starting eleven, to which Espada obeyed. He also coached Club León in Mexico (1961–62).

His last stage on the Espanyol bench was in 1966, and this time he formed a tandem with Alfredo Di Stéfano, and he again managed to save the team from relegation. In total, he remained linked to Espanyol for 24 years, holding various other positions within Espanyol and performing all kinds of tasks, whether in the first team or in the lower categories, always demonstrating his loyalty and service to the club.

== Later life and death ==
On 29 April 1988, Espada received the Medal of Sports Merit from the Generalitat de Catalunya.

Espada died in Barcelona on 7 October 1989, at the age of 77. However, Espanyol did not hold a minute's silence or wear black armbands after his death.
