= Alfonso Ardura =

Spanish soldier, sports leader, and politician

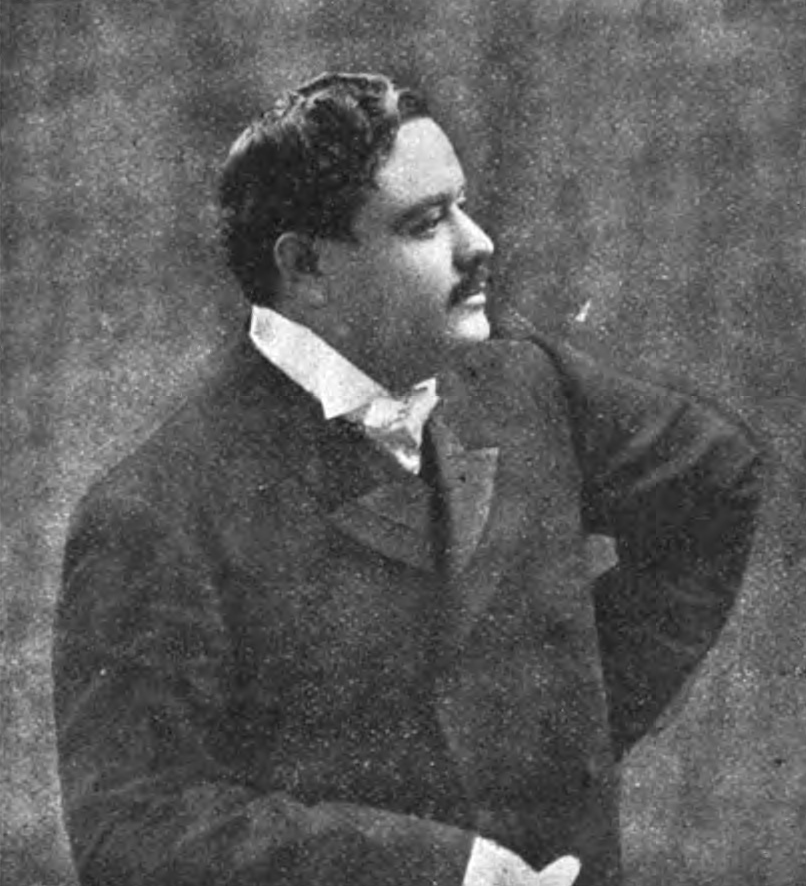
- Portrait of Alfonso Ardura y Altuna published in 1915
- Born: Alfons Ardura Altuna; 1865; Puerto Rico
- Died: 5 April 1934 (aged 57–58); Barcelona, Catalonia, Spain
- Citizenship: Spanish
- Occupations: Soldier; Lawyers; Fencers; Sports leader; Politician
- Known for: 7th President of RCD Espanyol

7th President of RCD Espanyol
- In office 1913–1914
- Preceded by: Santiago de la Riva
- Succeeded by: José Gaspar Hardoy

6th Catalan Fencing Federation
- In office 1929–1931
- Preceded by: José María de Palleja
- Succeeded by: Eusebio Bertrand

Alfonso Ardura Altuna (1876 – 5 April 1934) was a Spanish soldier, politician, and sports leader who served as the president of both RCD Espanyol in 1913 and 1914, and the Catalan Fencing Federation between 1929 and 1931.

== Professional career ==
Hardoy was born in 1876 in Puerto Rico. He served as a soldier in Puerto Rico, but following the defeat in the Spanish–American War in 1898, he was expatriated to the Iberian Peninsula, where he settled in Barcelona and married the daughter of Ramon Fernández Valdés, an entrepreneur in the electrical sector. In 1918 he was a member of the Consultative Board of the Circle of the Hispano-American Mercantile Union and of the Association of Neighbors of Carrer de Balmes for the promotion of the construction of the railway in 1924.

In the municipal elections of 1909, Ardura was elected municipal councilor of the City Council of Barcelona for District 8 in the ranks of the Radical Republican Party. Lawyer and judge by profession, he was a judge in the Courts of Barcelona, and in June 1931, he was the substitute judge of Josep Balaguer Ribas of the Sarrià-Sant Gervasi district.

== Sporting career ==
=== Presidency of RCD Espanyol ===
When RCD Espanyol was granted the title of Real ("Royal") by the King Alfonso XIII in 1912, the Ardura brothers, along with the likes of Julià Clapera and Emilio Sampere, and other radical figures left the club in reference to the Radical Republican Party founded in 1908 by Alejandro Lerroux, which was not on good terms with the attributes of royalty.

On 19 July 1913, Ardura was appointed as the seventh president of RCD Espanyol, replacing Santiago de la Riva, who had left the presidency. He was not a man who aspired to this position, but he was one of the few respected by the different antagonistic sectors of the club. Under his leadership, Ardura incorporated former prestigious members into the board of directors, such as the ex-president Julià Clapera and captain Emilio Sampere. He also trusted the experience of another ex-president: Evelio Doncós, and his vice-president José Gaspar Hardoy to continue with the RCD Espanyol sports project.

In December 1913, when he was able to verify that the organizational chart was working well and that Hardoy was an intelligent man, well regarded by the members of the Board, and that he would agree to take over from him, Ardura decided to leave the presidency, being replaced by Hardoy.

=== Fencing ===
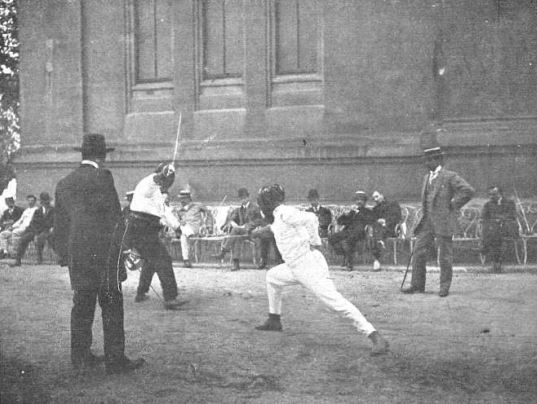
Fencing fight between Ardura and Manuel F. Creus in 1909.

Ardura was a renowned fencing master and an outstanding marksman who won several Spanish championships in Sabre, his best weapon. He used to train in the armory of Eduardo Alesson and excelled in sabre and sword modalities during his youth. In 1911, a group of shooters led by Ardura formed the El Foment de l’Esgrima de Barcelona (the Promotion of Fencing in Barcelona Society), of which he was president and whose statutes were drawn by Mario Llorens on the proposals of master-at-arms Félix Lyon d'Artiz. He was the 6th president of the Catalan Fencing Federation between 1929 and 1931.

Ardura was also a member of the Equestrian Circle and the Military Circle. In 1910 he was offered the honorary presidency of the Barcelona Hockey Club.

== Death ==
Ardura died in Barcelona on 5 April 1934, at the age of 57 or 58 years old.
