= Trinidad Ardura =

Spanish writer

Trinidad Ardura (born Asturias) is a Spanish writer. She studied economics at Complutense University in Madrid, and lived and worked in Salamanca for many years. She is known for her two books Olvido and Que no se entere Mendoza. Olvido was awarded the Premio del Certamen Literario Internacional de la Asociación de Críticos y Comentaristas de Arte de Miami.
