= Francisco Román Cenarro =

Spanish sports leader (1902 – 1969)

- Born: Francisco Román Cenarro; 4 October 1902; Barcelona, Catalonia, Spain
- Died: 10 October 1969 (aged 67); Barcelona, Catalonia, Spain
- Resting place: Cemetery of Montjuïc
- Citizenship: Spanish
- Occupations: Sports leader; Councilor of the City Council of Barcelona.
- Known for: 14th president of RCD Espanyol

President of RCD Espanyol
- In office 1942–1947
- Preceded by: Genaro de la Riva
- Succeeded by: José Salas Painello

President of Catalan Football Federation
- In office April 1957 – 1961
- Preceded by: Ramon Capdevila
- Succeeded by: Antonio J. de Capmany

Francisco Román Cenarro (4 October 1902 – 10 October 1969), also known as Paco Román, was a Spanish man who served as the president of RCD Espanyol between 1942 and 1947, and then as the president of Catalan Football Federation between 1957 and 1961. Outside of sport, he also worked as a municipal councilor of the City Council of Barcelona.

== Presidency of RCD Espanyol ==
In his youth, he was a player and always a sports enthusiast. In 1942, Román Cenarro was appointed as the 14th president of RCD Espanyol, replacing Genaro de la Riva. His continuing defense of the Sarrià stadium with the club's assets lead to a war against the De La Riva family, who had bought the stadium in 1922. This conflict was not resolved until months later, when the field became part of the club's heritage and the De La Riva family obtained compensation. In that same year, Román began the procedures to create the skate hockey section, electing Lieutenant Colonel Salas Painello as the section's delegate.

Under his leadership, the club reached the final of the 1947 Copa del Generalísimo (the name of the Copa del Rey during Francoist Spain) against Real Madrid CF, which was designated to be held in a venue at La Coruña, which caused Román to clash with the Spanish Football Federation. This fact caused Paco Román to be terminated as president of the club by the Federation. The final ended in a 0–2 loss to Madrid, courtesy of two extra-time goals from Pablo Vidal and Pruden. This confrontation with established power generated the sympathy of the fans, the establishments and even of the Catalan press. Julià Clapera then held the presidency on an interim basis, until Salas Painello was elected as the new president.

== Other presidencies ==
In 1951, in an attempt to gain the presidency of the Spanish Federation, he positioned himself in favor of FC Barcelona and against Real Madrid, which was considered as being damaging to RCD Espanyol, thus earning him the antipathy of many of those who had once admired him.

In April 1957, Román was appointed as the president of the Catalan Football Federation (replacing Ramon Capdevila), a position that he held for four years until 1961, when he was replaced by Antonio J. de Capmany. He was also a representative and vice president of the Inter-Cities Fairs Cup Committee in Spain.

== Later life and death ==
In the decrees of the Barcelona mayorship of July 1961, Román appeared as a vocal in the presentation of both the industrial and economic paper and in the presentation on public services reform, both of which for the Municipality of Barcelona. He also appears as the only member of the Provincial Tourism Board and as a Councilor of the municipal executive commission of the City Council of Barcelona.

Román died in Barcelona on 10 October 1969, at the age of 66, and was then buried at the Cemetery of Montjuïc. On the following day the Spanish newspaper Mundo Deportivo stated that "Don Francisco died in our city, one of the personalities with the most pronounced and most prominent character that Catalan sport has had in recent decades".
