= Alejandro Santiago =

Spanish footballer (born 2007)

Personal information
- Full name: Alejandro Santiago Vargas
- Date of birth: 26 May 2007 (age 19)
- Place of birth: Gavà, Spain
- Position: Winger

Team information
- Current team: Espanyol B
- Number: 11

Youth career
- EF Gavà
- 2024–2025: Espanyol

Senior career*
| Years | Team | Apps | (Gls) |
| 2025– | Espanyol B | 30 | (5) |
| 2026– | Espanyol | 1 | (0) |
- * Club domestic league appearances and goals as of 1 November 2026

Alejandro Santiago Vargas (born 26 May 2007) is a Spanish professional footballer who plays as a winger for RCD Espanyol B.

== Career ==
Born in Gavà, Barcelona, Catalonia, Santiago joined RCD Espanyol's youth sides in 2024, from hometown side EF Gavà. On 17 January of the following year, he renewed his contract until 2029.

Santiago made his senior debut with the reserves on 6 September 2025, playing the last 25 minutes of a 1–0 Segunda Federación away loss to UD Poblense. He was definitely promoted to the B-side the following February, being handed the number 16 jersey.

Santiago made his professional – and La Liga – debut with the Pericos on 30 October 2026, starting in a 1–0 away win over Villarreal CF.
