= RCD Espanyol =

Association football club in Spain

Espanyol
- Full name: Reial Club Deportiu; Espanyol de Barcelona, S.A.D.
- Nicknames: Periquitos (Parakeets) Blanc-i-blaus (White and Blue)
- Short name: RCDE
- Founded: 28 October 1900; 126 years ago (as Sociedad Española de Football)
- Stadium: RCDE Stadium
- Capacity: 40,000
- Owner(s): Velocity Sport Limited (Alan Pace and JJ Watt)
- President: Alan Pace
- Head coach: Eder Sarabia
- League: La Liga
- 2025–26: La Liga, 11th of 20
- Website: rcdespanyol.com
Home colours	Away colours	Third colours

Reial Club Deportiu Espanyol de Barcelona, S.A.D. (Catalan: [rəˈjal ˈklub dəpuɾˈtiw əspəˈɲɔl də βəɾsəˈlonə]; "Royal Spanish Sports Club of Barcelona"), commonly known as RCD Espanyol, is a Spanish professional sports club based in the province of Barcelona, Catalonia. The club competes in La Liga, the top tier of Spanish football.

Founded in 1900 in Barcelona, Espanyol currently play their home games just outside the city at the RCDE Stadium, which holds up to 40,000 spectators. Domestically, Espanyol has won the Copa del Rey four times, most recently in 2006. In international competitions, the club reached the UEFA Cup final in 1988 and 2007. It has a long-standing local rivalry with FC Barcelona.

== Name ==
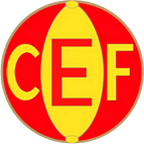
First shield of Club Español de Fútbol

Initially known as the Sociedad Española de Football on its foundation, the name was changed to Club Español de Fútbol in 1901. In 1906, the club folded due to financial reasons and most of the players joined the X Sporting Club, which came to win the Campionat de Catalunya three times in a row before disappearing in 1908 to merge with the Spanish Jiu-Jitsu Club to be effectively relaunched as the Club Deportivo Español, and in 1910, they adopted their present-day colours. Espanyol is one of several Spanish football clubs granted patronage by the Spanish crown and thus entitled to use Real in their names and the royal crown on their badge. This right was granted to Espanyol in 1912 by Alfonso XIII and the club subsequently became known as the Real Club Deportivo Español.

Following the abdication of the same king in 1931 and the declaration of the Second Spanish Republic, due to prohibition of royal symbols, the club adopted the more Catalan/republican friendly name, Club Esportiu Espanyol. After the Spanish Civil War, the name was reverted.

The club took the Catalan spelling for its name in February 1995. The word "Deportiu" in Reial Club Deportiu Espanyol de Barcelona is a Catalanised form of the original word "Deportivo" (Castilian), despite the correct word being "Esportiu" in the Catalan language. This choice was made in order to retain the initials "RCD" in the club's name.

== History ==
=== Foundation and club culture ===
Espanyol was founded on 28 October 1900 by Ángel Rodríguez Ruiz, an engineering student at the University of Barcelona. The club's original home was in the well-off district of Sarrià; Espanyol was the first club in Spain formed exclusively by Spanish fans of the game, with the other early clubs having links to Britain or central Europe.

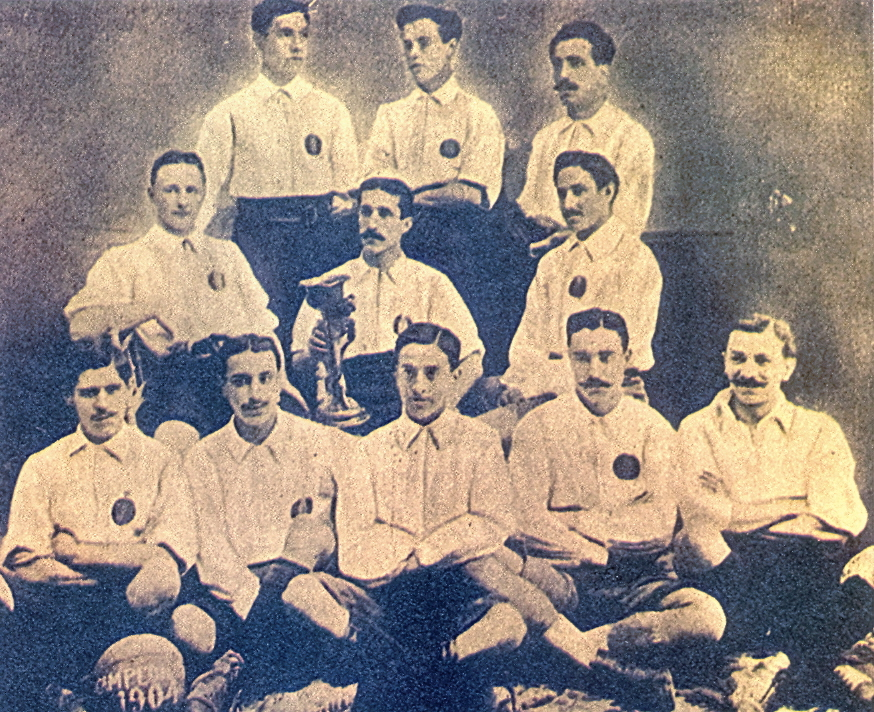
CD Espanyol de Barcelona, Catalan champions in 1904

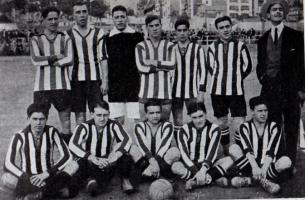
RCD Español in 1912

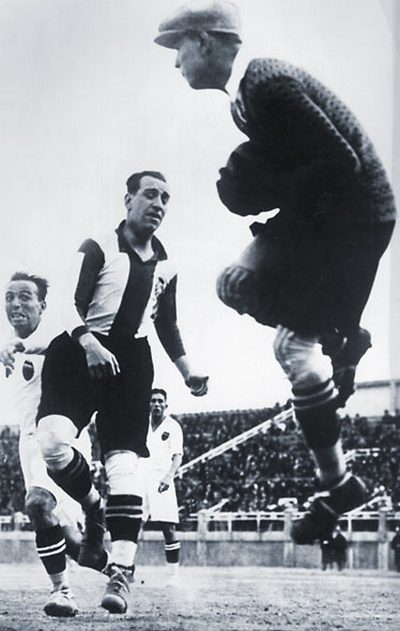
Ricardo Zamora with Español

A friend of the club founder owned a textile business and happened to have an abundance of yellow material left over from a job. In 1910, the club changed its name to the Club Deportivo Español and at the proposal of Eduardo Corrons, the club's number one partner for many years, the club agreed to choose blue and white stripes as shirt colours and as the central colours of the club badge. Blue and white were chosen in homage to the colours on the shield of the great Sicilian-Aragonese Admiral Roger de Lluria, who sailed the Mediterranean protecting the interests of the Crown of Aragon in the Middle Ages. The club was successful from the very beginning, winning the first Campionat de Catalunya in 1903 and subsequently playing in the first Copa del Rey in 1903.

In 1906, Club Español de Football had to suspend its activities due to a lack of players, since most of them were university students who enrolled to study at universities outside Catalonia. X Sporting Club took advantage of this as most of the remaining Español players joined them, which meant a big leap in quality for the club, and as a result the X won the Catalan championship three times in a row between 1905 and 1908, beating the likes of FC Internacional and FC Barcelona for the title. This historic side had the likes of Pedro Gibert, José Irízar, and Santiago Massana. It was not until 1909 that X and Español were restructured again, when several of the former university students returned to Barcelona with the idea of refounding Club Español de Football, which they achieved on 27 December 1908, when X merged with the Spanish Jiu-Jitsu Club.

In the 1910s, they won the Campionat de Catalunya three times, in 1911–12, 1914–15, and 1917–18, winning later largely thanks to their backline led by Ricardo Zamora. They also reached the final of the Copa del Rey twice in 1911 and 1915, but lost to Athletic Bilbao on both occasions.

In 1994, Espanyol created its reserve team, Espanyol B, currently playing in the Segunda División B.

=== Two UEFA Cup finals (1988–2009) ===
Javier Clemente was hired in 1986. In his first season, he took the team to a joint-best third place, qualifying for the UEFA Cup. They defeated Borussia Mönchengladbach, A.C. Milan, Inter Milan, TJ Vitkovice, and Club Brugge KV to reach the final, losing on penalties to Bayer 04 Leverkusen after a 3–3 aggregate draw. Two relegations followed, but the club remained in La Liga from winning the 1993–94 Segunda División until relegated at the conclusion of the 2019-20 COVID pandemic impacted season.

Juli Pardo oversaw the transformation of the club into a Sociedad Anónima Deportiva. In the wake of the accumulated debt, the club were forced to sell the Sarrià Stadium, which was eventually demolished in 1997.

Paco Flores' Espanyol won the 2000 Copa del Rey Final 2–1 against Atlético Madrid at Mestalla, a first cup win since 1940. Six years later, under Miguel Ángel Lotina, the club won again, this time 4–1 against Real Zaragoza in Madrid, with goals by Raúl Tamudo, Luis García (two) and Coro.

Chart of RCD Espanyol league performance 1929–present

With this cup win, Espanyol entered the UEFA Cup. They won all their group games, before dispatching Livorno, Maccabi Haifa, Benfica, and Werder Bremen to reach the final. In the final, held on 16 May at Hampden Park in Glasgow, Espanyol fell to fellow La Liga side Sevilla, losing 3–1 in a shootout following a 2–2 draw. They became the only football team in UEFA Cup history to remain unbeaten in the tournament, yet not take home the trophy. Walter Pandiani, who would leave the club at the end of the season, was the UEFA Cup's top goalscorer that season. On 9 June 2007, Tamudo became Espanyol's highest-ever goalscorer after surpassing the 111 goals scored by Rafael Marañón, and ended the night with 113.

On 31 May 2009, Espanyol played its last match at the Estadio Olímpico de Montjuic, a 3–0 defeat of Málaga. Espanyol had played in the Estadi Olímpic after moving from their previous ground in Sarria. With the move, club talisman Raúl Tamudo had the unique distinction of having played in three different home stadiums with his club: Sarrià, Montjuïc and, beginning in the 2009–10 season, the Cornellà-El Prat.

=== Recent years (2009–present) ===
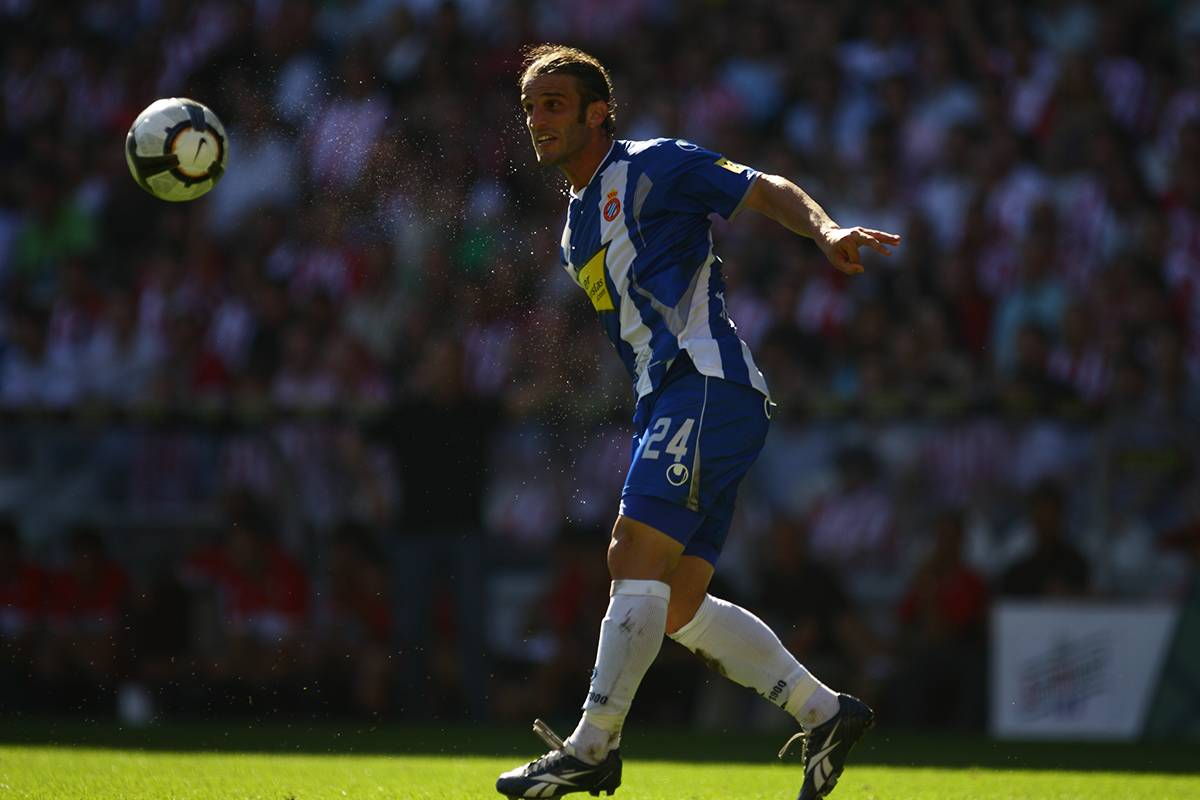
Iván Alonso in action during a La Liga fixture in August 2009

In January 2009, former Espanyol defender Mauricio Pochettino was hired as manager with the club in the relegation zone – his first senior job. He won 2–1 against rivals Barcelona at the Camp Nou in February to help keep the club up; Barcelona, under Pep Guardiola, won the treble that season.

After 12 seasons playing at the Estadi Olímpic de Montjuïc, Espanyol moved to the Estadi de Cornellá-El Prat. The new stadium was officially inaugurated on 2 August 2009 with a match between Espanyol and Liverpool; Espanyol won 3–0, with Luis García scoring the first goal at the ground, followed by a Ben Sahar double. Six days later, Espanyol captain Daniel Jarque died from a cardiac arrest aged 26 in the Florence neighbourhood of Coverciano, where the club was at the time after playing several fixtures in Italy. Since then, in the 21st minute – his former shirt number – of every Espanyol match, an ovation is made in his honour for a full minute.

After Pochettino left in 2012, the club maintained their position in the top flight under a series of other managers. In January 2016, Chinese businessman Chen Yansheng took over the club by acquiring a 54% stake. In the 2018–19 season, Espanyol finished 7th, thus returning to the Europa League for the first time since their final run in 2006–07. However, the club suffered relegation for the first time since 1994 the following season, after a 1–0 loss at Barcelona. On 3 August 2020 the club published an official statement urging La Liga to suspend relegation; nevertheless relegation was not avoided. Espanyol won promotion back to La Liga at the first attempt on 8 May 2021 following a 0–0 draw against Zaragoza, with four matches to spare in the 42-game season.

Since 2022, Espanyol have been involved in a strategic cooperation with LEYU SPORTS, who became the official Asian partner of the club. On 28 May 2023, Espanyol were relegated to the Segunda División after two seasons in La Liga. Following a 4th place finish in the Segunda División, the club was promoted back to La Liga following a promotion 2–0 (2–1 aggregate) win against Real Oviedo on 23 June 2024.

On October 8, 2025, Velocity Sports Partners (VSP) announced that it had completed the acquisition of a majority stake in the Spanish club. VSP is the sports investment arm of ALK Capital.

== Rivalries ==
=== El derbi barceloní ===
In the first half of the 20th century during the Miguel Primo de Rivera dictatorship (1923–1930), FC Barcelona was seen as a symbol of Catalan identity. This contrasted with RCD Espanyol which cultivated alignment with the central authority.

In 1918, the municipalities of Catalonia promoted a campaign to ask the Spanish Government for a Statute of Autonomy. FC Barcelona joined that request and the Catalan press recognised FC Barcelona as a major cultural arm of the Catalan independence movement. The city's other team, RCD Espanyol, dissociated itself from the claim due to the former's success on the European stage.

Today FC Barcelona is the club that is closer to the political powers in Catalonia. Its last presidents have linked the club with the Catalan independence movement and the holding of a referendum, even though this causes discomfort among some Catalan fans and those in the rest of Spain who feel neglected and think the team is biased against them. Although some of RCD Espanyol's directors have expressed pro-independence stances, the club stays out of politics. It is believed that most of the team's fans are against the independence of Catalonia.

On numerous occasions RCD Espanyol has complained of unfavourable treatment towards the club in favour of FC Barcelona by some sections of Catalonian public media such as TV3.

Despite these differences in ideology, the derbi (derby) has always been more relevant to Espanyol supporters than those of Barcelona (who hold El Clásico in higher regard instead) due to the difference in objectives.

Though it is the most played local derby in the history of La Liga, it is also the most unbalanced, with Barcelona overwhelmingly dominant. In the league table, Espanyol has only managed to finish above Barça on three occasions in almost 70 years and the only all-Catalan Copa del Rey final was won by Barça in 1957. Espanyol has the consolation of achieving the largest margin win with a 6–0 victory in 1951.

Espanyol achieved a 2–1 win against FC Barcelona during the 2008–09 season, becoming the first team to defeat Barcelona at Camp Nou in their treble-winning season.

Espanyol lost 0–1 to FC Barcelona on 8 July 2020, to be relegated to the Segunda División.

== Stadium ==
From 1923 until 1997, Espanyol played their home games in Estadi de Sarrià in the Sarrià-Sant Gervasi district of Barcelona. In 1997, they moved to the Estadi Olímpic Lluís Companys on Montjuïc. For the beginning of the 2009–10 season, Espanyol moved into the newly constructed RCDE Stadium (also known as Estadi Cornellà-El Prat) between Cornellà de Llobregat and El Prat de Llobregat.

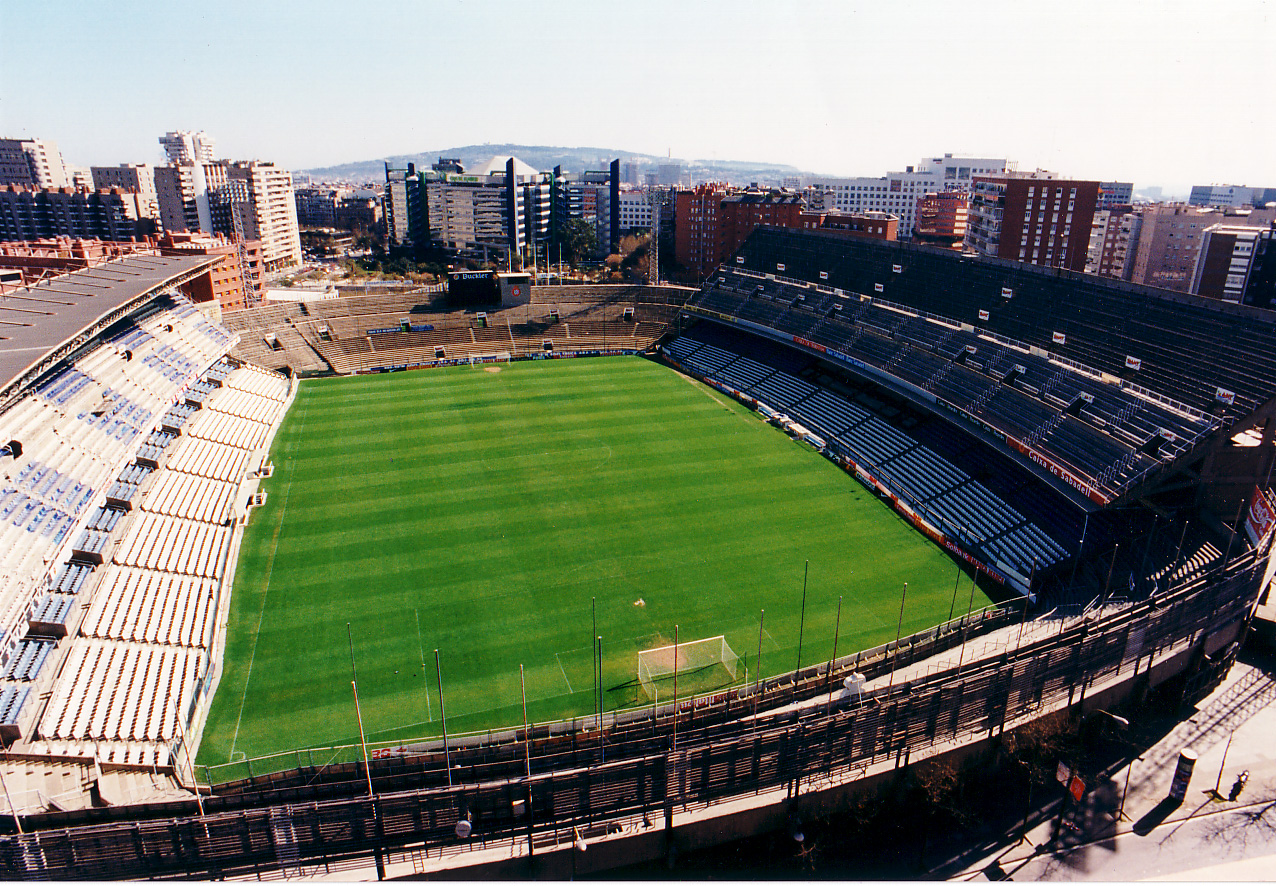
Estadi de Sarrià

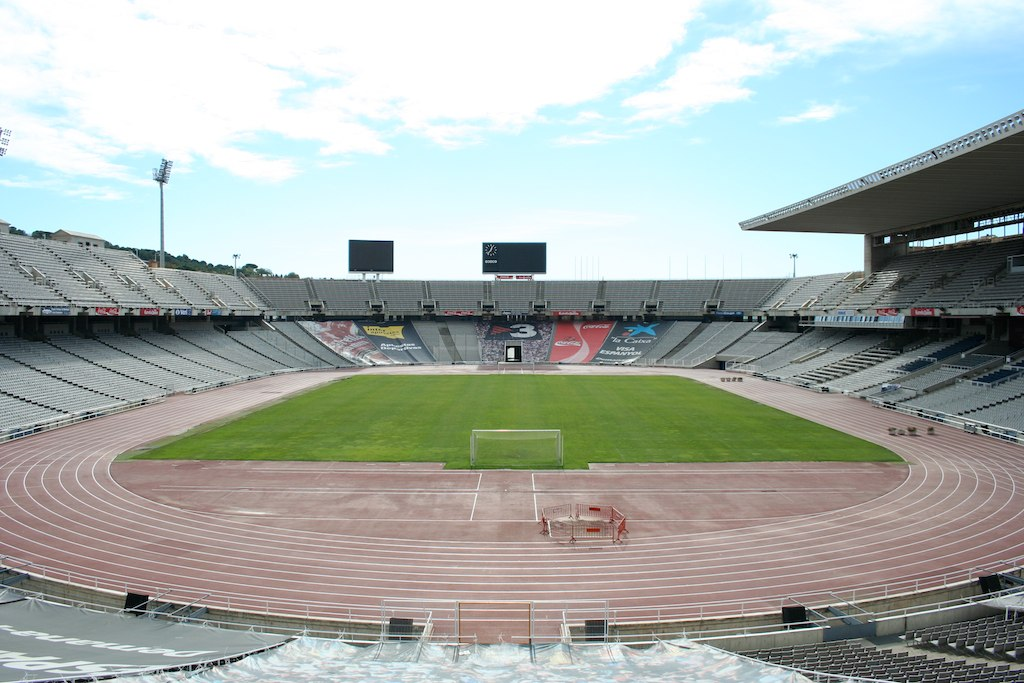
Estadi Olímpic de Montjuïc

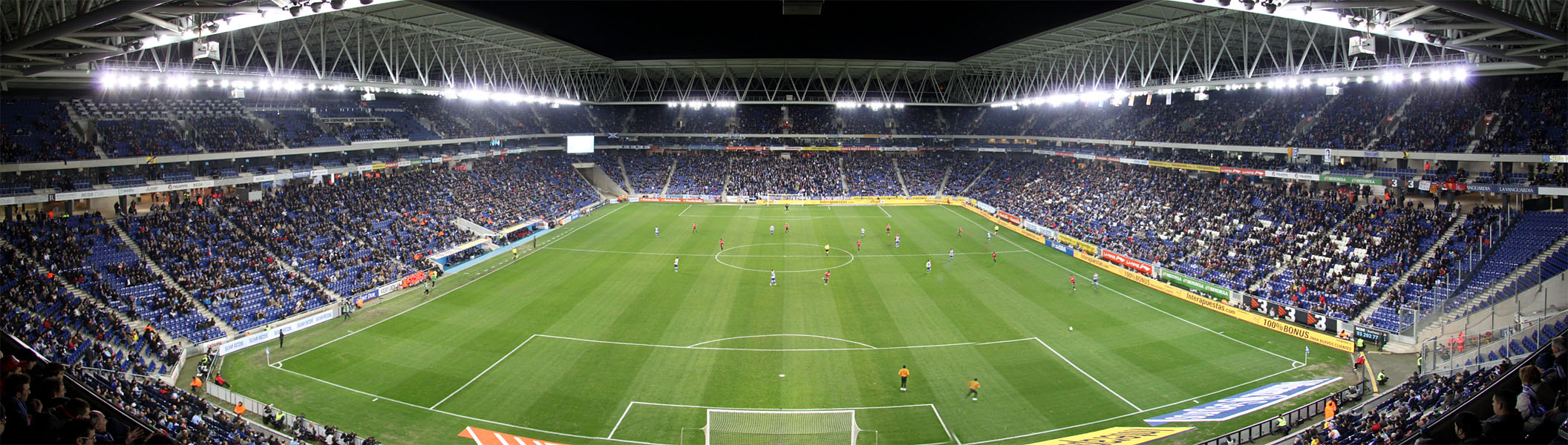
RCDE Stadium

== Competition summary ==
- 87 seasons in Primera División
- 6 seasons in Segunda División
- 8 participations in UEFA Cup / UEFA Europa League
- 2 participations in Inter-Cities Fairs Cup
- 2 participations in UEFA Intertoto Cup

=== Achievements ===
- In 1928, Espanyol became a founding member of La Liga, and in 1929, the team won their first Copa del Rey. Espanyol has completed the highest number of seasons in La Liga without winning the title.
- The team has qualified for the UEFA Cup/Europa League eight times (including the qualifications following their 2000 and 2006 Spanish Cup wins, which in earlier eras would instead have granted entry to the UEFA Cup Winners' Cup).
- Espanyol reached the UEFA Cup final in 1988, losing to Bayer Leverkusen of then-West Germany on penalty kicks (3–2), after a two-legged final of contrasts ended level (3–0 in Barcelona, 0–3 in Leverkusen). They reached a second final in 2007, losing to compatriots Sevilla, again on penalties (3–1) after a memorable match at Hampden Park, Glasgow ended 1–1 after normal time, and 2–2 after extra time.

== Honours ==
=== League ===
- Segunda División
  - Winners (2): 1993–94, 2020–21

=== Cups ===
- Copa del Rey
  - Winners (4): 1928–29, 1940, 1999–2000, 2005–06

==== Regional ====
- Campionat de Catalunya
  - Winners (9): 1902–03, 1903–04, 1911–12, 1914–15, 1917–18, 1928–29, 1932–33, 1936–37, 1939–40
- Supercopa de Catalunya
  - Winners (1): 2016

=== League ===
- Primera División
  - Winners (1): 2005–06

=== Cups ===
- Copa de la Reina
  - Winners (6): 1996, 1997, 2006, 2009, 2010, 2012

== Players ==
=== Current squad ===
As of 2 September 2026

Note: Flags indicate national team as defined under FIFA eligibility rules; some limited exceptions apply. Players may hold more than one non-FIFA nationality.

No.	Pos.	Nation	Player
1	GK	ESP	Ángel Fortuño
2	DF	ESP	Andoni Gorosabel (on loan from Athletic Bilbao)
3	DF	NED	Quilindschy Hartman (on loan from Burnley)
4	MF	ESP	Urko González de Zárate
5	DF	GER	Clemens Riedel
6	DF	URU	Leandro Cabrera (captain)
7	FW	ESP	Javi Puado (vice-captain)
8	MF	ESP	Edu Expósito
9	FW	ESP	Roberto Fernández
10	MF	ESP	Pol Lozano (3rd captain)
11	FW	ESP	Pere Milla
13	GK	SRB	Marko Dmitrović
14	DF	ESP	Unai Nuñez (on loan from Celta)

No.	Pos.	Nation	Player
15	FW	ESP	Bryan Zaragoza (on loan from Bayern Munich)
16	DF	SLO	Vanja Drkušić (on loan from Zenit Saint Petersburg)
17	FW	ESP	Jofre Carreras
18	FW	ESP	Marcos Fernández
19	FW	ESP	Kike García
20	MF	BRA	Gabriel Moscardo (on loan from Paris Saint-Germain)
21	DF	ESP	Roger Hinojo
22	MF	ESP	Álex Calatrava
23	DF	MAR	Omar El Hilali
24	FW	ENG	Tyrhys Dolan
26	MF	ESP	Rafel Bauzà
28	FW	ESP	Javi Hernández

=== Reserve team ===
Note: Flags indicate national team as defined under FIFA eligibility rules; some limited exceptions apply. Players may hold more than one non-FIFA nationality.

No.	Pos.	Nation	Player
27	DF	FRA	Adama Timera
29	MF	ESP	Victor Mullerat
31	GK	ESP	Llorenç Serred

No.	Pos.	Nation	Player
32	DF	ESP	José Ángel López
33	FW	ESP	Jan Peries
36	MF	ESP	Alejandro Santiago

=== Out on loan ===
Note: Flags indicate national team as defined under FIFA eligibility rules; some limited exceptions apply. Players may hold more than one non-FIFA nationality.

No.	Pos.	Nation	Player
—	DF	ESP	José Salinas (at Málaga until 30 June 2027)
—	MF	ESP	José Gragera (at Burgos until 30 June 2027)

No.	Pos.	Nation	Player
—	FW	ESP	Antoniu Roca (at Mallorca until 30 June 2027)
—	FW	MAR	Omar Sadik (at Ceuta until 30 June 2027)

=== Retired numbers ===
Note: Flags indicate national team as defined under FIFA eligibility rules; some limited exceptions apply. Players may hold more than one non-FIFA nationality.

No.	Pos.	Nation	Player
21	DF	ESP	Daniel Jarque (2002–09) – posthumous honour) (Note: Starting from 2018–19 season, Marc Roca and Nico Melamed wore the number 21.)

=== Players with most appearances ===
As of 12 September 2020
Competitive, professional matches only.

#	Name	Years	La Liga	Segunda División	Copa del Rey	Copa de la Liga	UEFA Cup	Other	Total
1	(Spain) Raúl Tamudo	1996–2010	340	—	26	—	14	9 (Note: 6 appearances in UEFA Intertoto Cup and 3 appearances in Supercopa de España)	389
2	(Spain) Antonio Argilés	1950–1964	301	14 (Note: All appearances in La Liga relegation play-offs)	38	—	—	4 (Note: All appearances in Inter-Cities Fairs Cup)	357
3	(Spain) José María	1965–1976	269	31	33	—	2	11 (Note: 8 appearances in Inter-Cities Fairs Cup and 3 appearances in Intertoto Cup)	346
4	(Cameroon) Thomas N'Kono	1982–1990	241	33 (Note: Including 2 appearances in La Liga relegation play-offs)	30	19	10	—	333
5	(Argentina) Mauricio Pochettino	1994–2006	275	—	30	—	13	2 (Note: All appearances in Supercopa de España)	320
6	(Spain) Fernando Molinos	1974–1984	264	—	43	6	6	—	319
7	(Spain) Manuel Zúñiga	1979–1988	259	—	29	18	9	—	315
8	(Spain) Marañón	1974–1983	261	—	43	4	6	—	314
9	(Spain) Arteaga	1993–2003	238	28	32	—	10	2	310
10	(Spain) Diego Orejuela	1982–1991	216	33 (Note: Including 2 appearances in La Liga relegation play-offs and 1 appearance in La Liga promotion play-offs)	27	15	12	—	303

== Coaches ==
(Scotland) Ted Garry (1922–24); (Spain) Francisco Bru (1924–26); (England) Jack Greenwell (1926–30); (Spain) Patricio Caicedo (1930–33); (Spain) Ramón Trabal (1933–35); (England) Harry Lowe (1935); (Spain) Patricio Caicedo (1935–43); (Spain) Pedro Solé (1943); (Spain) Crisant Bosch (1943–44); (Spain) Baltasar Albéniz (1944–45); (Spain) Crisant Bosch (1945–46); (Spain) Josep Planas (1946–47); (Spain) Josep Espada (1947–49); (Spain) Patricio Caicedo (1949–50); (Spain) Juan José Nogués (1950–52); (Argentina) Alejandro Scopelli (1952–54); (Spain) Josep Espada (1954–55); (Spain) Odilio Bravo (1955); (Spain) Ricardo Zamora (1955–57); (Hungary) Elemér Berkessy (1957–58); (France) Marcel Domingo (1958–59); (Spain) Antonio Barrios (1959–60); (Spain) Ernesto Pons (1960–61); (Argentina) Alejandro Scopelli (1961); (Spain) Ricardo Zamora (1961); (Spain) José Luis Saso (1961); (Spain) Ricardo Zamora (1961); (Spain) Julián Arcas (1961–62); (Paraguay) Heriberto Herrera (1962–63); (Spain) Pedro Areso (1963); (Spain) Pedro Solé (1963–64)	(Hungary) László Kubala (1964–65); (Spain) Fernando Argila (1965–66); (Spain) Josep Espada (1966); (Hungary) Jenő Kalmár (1966–68); (Spain) Antonio Argilés (1968–69); (Chile) Fernando Riera (1969–70); (Spain) Rafael Iriondo (1970); (Czechoslovakia) Ferdinand Daučík (1970–71); (Uruguay) José Santamaría (1971–77); (Paraguay) Heriberto Herrera (1977–78); (Spain) José Antonio Irulegui (1978–79); (Spain) Vicente Miera (1979–80); (Spain) José María Maguregui (1980–83); (Socialist Federal Republic of Yugoslavia) Milorad Pavić (1983); (Spain) Xabier Azkargorta (1983–86); (Spain) Javier Clemente (1986–89); (Spain) José Mauri (1989); (Argentina) Raúl Longhi (1989); (Spain) José María García De Andoin (1989); (Spain) Benito Joanet (1989); (Spain) Juanjo Díaz (1989–90); (Spain) Luis Aragonés (1990–91); (Socialist Federal Republic of Yugoslavia) Ljupko Petrović (1991); (Spain) Jaume Sabaté (1991–92); (Spain) Javier Clemente (1992); (Spain) José Novoa (1992–93); (Spain) Juanjo Díaz (1993); (Spain) José Antonio Camacho (1993–96); (Spain) Pepe Carcelén (1996–97); (Spain) Vicente Miera (1997); (Spain) Paco Flores (1997)	(Spain) José Antonio Camacho (1997–98); (Argentina) Marcelo Bielsa (1998); (Argentina) Miguel Ángel Brindisi (1998–2000); (Spain) Paco Flores (2000–02); (Spain) Juande Ramos (2002); (Spain) Ramón Moya (2002); (Spain) Javier Clemente (2002–03); (France) Luis Fernández (2003–04); (Spain) Miguel Ángel Lotina (2004–06); (Spain) Ernesto Valverde (2006–08); (Spain) Tintín Márquez (2008); (Spain) Mané (2008–09); (Argentina) Mauricio Pochettino (2009–12); (Mexico) Javier Aguirre (2012–14); (Spain) Sergio González (2014–15); (Romania) Constantin Gâlcă (2015–16); (Spain) Quique Sánchez Flores (2016–18); (Spain) David Gallego (2018); (Spain) Rubi (2018–19); (Spain) David Gallego (2019); (Spain) Pablo Machín (2019); (Spain) Abelardo (2019–2020); (Spain) Francisco Rufete (2020); (Spain) Vicente Moreno (2020–2022); (Spain) Luis Blanco (2022); (Spain) Diego Martínez (2022–2023); (Spain) Luis García (2023); (Spain) Luis Miguel Ramis (2023–2024); (Spain) Manolo González (2024–2026)

== Club officials ==
As of 28 October 2026

=== Current technical staff ===
Role	Name
Head coach	(Spain) Sergio García (caretaker)
Assistant coach	Vacant
Fitness coach	Vacant
Goalkeeping coach	(Spain) Josep Pascual
Analyst	Vacant
Doctor	(Spain) Narciso Amigó (Spain) Quique Pérez
Physiotherapist	(Spain) Adrià García (Spain) Daniel Marco (Spain) Francesc Soriano (Spain) David González
Recovery coach	(Spain) Antoni Pajuelo
Nutritionist	(Spain) Robert Bausells
Kitman	(Spain) Ángel Inac (Spain) Víctor Ruiz (Spain) Oscar Busquet
Delegate	(Spain) Guillem Calzón

=== Board of directors ===
As of 11 May 2026

Role	Name
Owner	(England) Velocity Sport Limited
President	(United States) Alan Pace
Vice president & CEO	(China) Mao Ye
Vice president	(Spain) Antonio Dávila Parra
Board of directors	(United States) Stuart Hunt (Spain) Rafa Marañón
Board secretary	(Spain) Iñaki Frías Inchausti
Board vice secretary	(Spain) Jorge Sarró Riu
Compliance officers	(Spain) Joan Fitó (Spain) Antoni Alegre
CEO	(China) Mao Ye
Deputy director general	(Spain) Antoni Alegre Puzo
Sporting CEO	(Spain) Ander Garitano
Sporting director	(Spain) Monchi
Technical director	(Spain) Marco Otero
Women's football director	(Spain) Dolors Ribalta
Head of medical services	(Spain) Narciso Amigó
Financial director	(Spain) Joan Fitó Pardo
Communications director	(Spain) Andrés Merello
Institutional delations director	(Spain) Xavier Andreu
Social area director	(Spain) Alberto Ariza Navarro
Chief technology officer	(Spain) Rodrigo Meruelo
Stadium & operations director	(Spain) Mariano Tejero Fernández
Head of Dani Jarque training grounds	(Spain) Eloy Pérez
Head of institutional relations and protocol office	(Spain) Olga Moscatel Vivet
Human resources area	(Spain) M. Carmen Cabanas
Head of security and mobility	(Spain) Carme Gerez Cuéllar
IT systems director	(Spain) Ángel Rojas Gómez
Head of B2B MKT	(Spain) Pablo Punsoda
Head of B2C MKT	(Spain) Tamara Rojas
Head of Escola RCDE Dani Jarque	(Spain) Albert Villarroya
Data protection delegate	(Spain) Joan Fitó
Child protection delegate	(Spain) Àlex García
Business coordination and Asia expansion	(United States) Austin Neville

== Presidents ==
Dates	Name
1900–02	(Spain) Àngel Rodríguez
1902–06	(Spain) José María Miró
1906–09	no activities
1909	(Spain) Julià Clapera
1909–10	(Spain) Àngel Rodríguez
1910–11	(Spain) Evelio Doncos
1911–12	(Puerto Rico) José Gaspar Hardoy
1912–13	(Spain) Santiago de la Riva
1913–14	(Spain) Alfonso Ardura
1914–15	(Puerto Rico) José Gaspar Hardoy

Dates	Name
1915–18	(Spain) José María Bernadas
1918–19	(Uruguay) Manuel Allende
1919–20	(Spain) Victorià de la Riva
1920–22	(Spain) Genaro de la Riva
1922–22	(Spain) Eusebio Fernández Muñiz
1922–24	(Spain) Victorià de la Riva
1924–25	(Spain) Santiago de la Riva
1925–30	(Spain) Genaro de la Riva
1930–31	(Spain) Santiago de la Riva
1931–33	(Spain) Javier de Salas

Dates	Name
1933–42	(Spain) Genaro de la Riva
1942–47	(Spain) Francisco Román Cenarro
1947–48	(Spain) José Salas Paniello
1948–58	(Spain) Francisco Javier Sáenz
1958–60	(Spain) Frederic Marimón Grifell
1960–62	(Spain) Victorià de la Riva
1962–63	(Spain) Cesáreo Castilla Delgado
1963–67	(Spain) Josep Fusté Noguera
1967–69	(Spain) Juan Vilá
1969–70	(Spain) Josep Fusté Noguera

Dates	Name
1970–82	(Spain) Manuel Meler
1982–89	(Spain) Antonio Baró
1989	(Spain) Ferran Martorell
1989–93	(Spain) Julio Pardo
1993–97	(Spain) Francisco Perelló
1997–11	(Spain) Daniel Sánchez Llibre
2011–12	(Spain) Ramon Condal
2012–16	(Spain) Joan Collet
2016–25	(China) Chen Yansheng
2025–	(United States) Alan Pace

== Historical departments of RCD Espanyol ==
Until the 1990s, Espanyol had several sporting sections. In March 2017, the Association of Supporters and Shareholders of RCD Espanyol boosted a project for recovering the sporting sections of the club, but this time without any economic link with the football team. The new multi-sports club was created with the name of Seccions Deportives Espanyol (Sporting sections Espanyol).

Two months later, the association confirmed that Espanyol would start competing in the 2017–18 season, with a roller hockey team and women's volleyball teams. In the next season, the basketball section was refounded and a new section of handball would be created.

=== Men's basketball ===
- Copa del Rey

Winners (1): 1941

- Catalan championship

Winners (2): 1931, 1932
Runners-up (3): 1941, 1943, 1954

=== Women's basketball ===
- Copa de la Reina

Winners (1): 1943
Runners-up (1): 1944

=== Men's rink hockey ===
- Copa del Rey

Winners (11): 1944, 1947, 1948, 1949, 1951, 1954, 1955, 1956, 1957, 1961, 1962
Runners-up (4): 1946, 1952, 1953, 1958

=== Women's volleyball ===
- Superliga

Winners (3): 1985, 1988, 1991

- Copa de la Reina

Winners (5): 1984, 1985, 1986, 1990, 1992

=== Men's baseball ===
- División de Honor

Winners (2): 1946, 1953

== See also ==
- RCD Espanyol B
- RCD Espanyol cantera
- Ciutat de Barcelona Trophy
