= Benito Joanet =

Spanish footballer (1935–2020)

Personal information
- Full name: Benito Joanet Giménez
- Date of birth: 16 September 1935
- Place of birth: Esplugues de Llobregat, Spain
- Date of death: 22 March 2020 (aged 84)
- Place of death: Alicante, Spain
- Height: 1.80 m (5 ft 11 in)
- Position: Goalkeeper

Senior career*
Years	Team	Apps	(Gls)
1954–1955	Espanyol	0	(0)
1957–1959	Real Zaragoza	0	(0)
1959–1964	Espanyol	62	(0)
1960–1961	→ Terrassa (loan)	4	(0)
1964–1965	Europa	16	(0)
1965–1971	Deportivo de La Coruña	127	(0)
Total		209	(0)

Managerial career
- 1977–1979: Hércules
- 1980–1982: Castellón
- 1983: Antequerano
- 1983–1985: Cádiz
- 1985: Mallorca
- 1986–1987: Castellón
- 1987–1988: Hércules
- 1988–1989: Tenerife
- 1989–1990: Espanyol
- 1990–1991: Salamanca
- 1992: Las Palmas
- * Club domestic league appearances and goals

Benito Joanet Giménez (16 September 1935 – 22 March 2020) was a Spanish football player and manager.

== Playing career ==
Born in Esplugues de Llobregat, Joanet played as a goalkeeper for Espanyol, Real Zaragoza, Terrassa, Europa and Deportivo de La Coruña.

== Coaching career ==
After retiring he became a football manager, taking charge of Hércules, Castellón, Antequerano, Cádiz, Mallorca, Tenerife, Espanyol, Salamanca and Las Palmas.

== Death ==
Joanet died in Alicante on 22 March 2020 from COVID-19, during the COVID-19 pandemic.
