= Cebrià de Montoliu =

Catalan town planner, architect and social reformer (1873–1923)

Cebrià de Montoliu i de Togores (Palma 1873 - Albuquerque, New Mexico, 27 August 1923) was a Catalan town planner and architect, social reformer, and one of the introducers of the English-language culture in Catalonia. Montoliu translated many of Shakespeare's plays into Catalan and can be remembered as the great translator of John Ruskin, almost unknown to the Catalan intelligentsia of the time.

In 1903 Cebrià de Montoliu participated as speaker in the Catalan University Congress. In the summer of 1907 is one of the signatories of the Manifesto for Spanish regeneration alongside names such as Gabriel Alomar, Josep Carner, Amadeu Hurtado, his brother, Manuel de Montoliu, Josep Pijoan, and Francesc Pujols, among others.

The influence of Ruskin had a powerful impact on Montoliu in believing in the power of transforming education and in 1903, de Montoliu participated in a series of lectures on trying to convey what he had learned of the institutions of social culture in England and France. He was also a follower of great town planners such as Ebenezer Howard and Patrick Geddes and met Geddes at the Civic Building Exhibition in Ghent, Belgium in 1913. He proposed a museum in Barcelona which would open its doors to coincide with the International Electrical Exhibition that had been planned in the city in 1917. He was then influential in the development of Barcelona as a Garden City, and was noted for his ecological town planning. He has been described as an interpreter of modern urbanism.

Notable works include Las modernas ciudades y sus problemas a la luz de la Exposición Cívica de Berlín (1913) and El sistema Taylor y su crítica (1916). The Barcelona City Council published a book about him in 1993.
