= Ortigosa de Cameros =

- Municipality
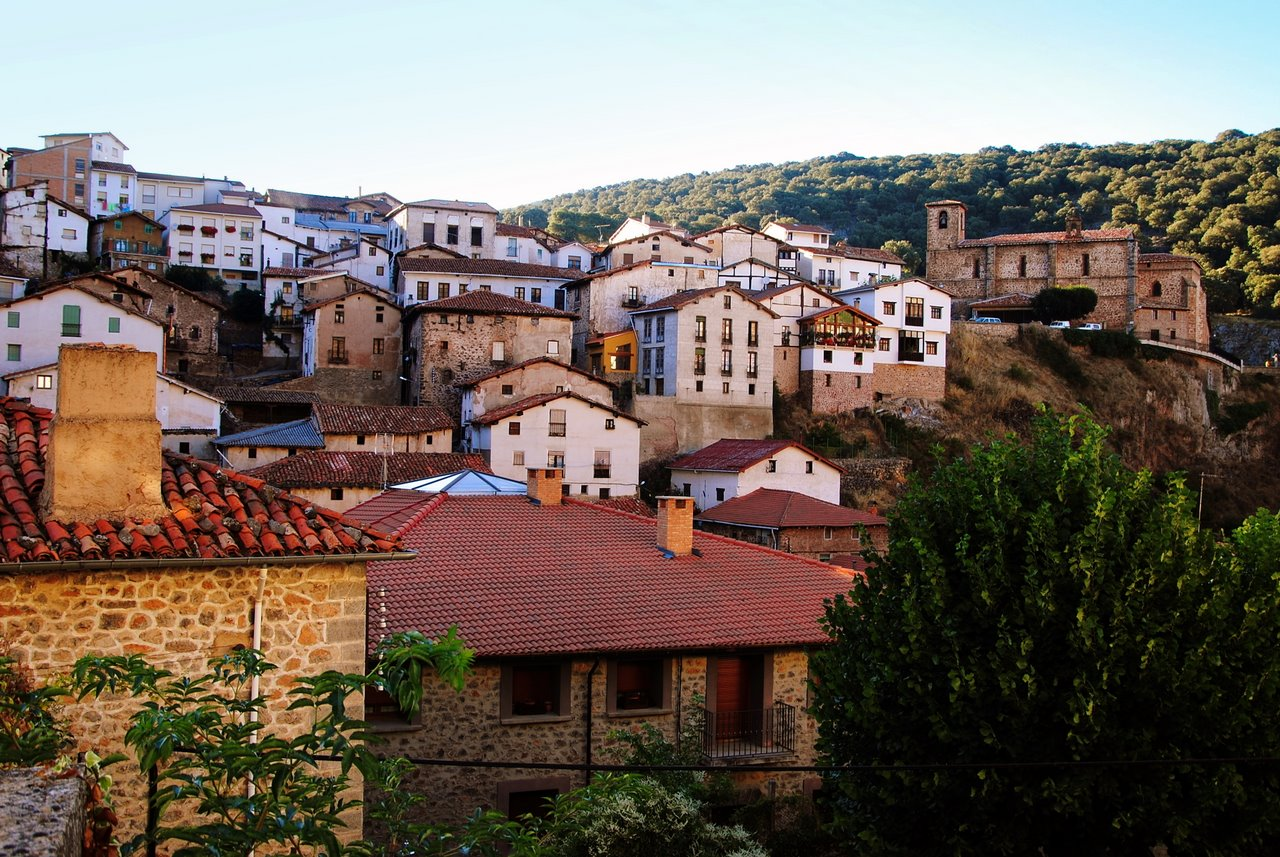
- Skyline of Ortigosa de Cameros

- Location within La Rioja, Spain Location within Spain
- Coordinates: 42°10′33″N 2°42′18″W
- Country: Spain
- Autonomous community: La Rioja
- Comarca: Camero Nuevo

Government
  - Mayor: Carlos González Ortega (Unión de Ciudadanos Independientes UCIN)

Area
  - Total: 33.02 km^{2} (12.75 sq mi)
- Elevation: 1,061 m (3,481 ft)

Population (2025-01-01)
  - Total: 214
- Demonym(s): ortigosano, na
- Postal code: 26124
- Website: www.ortigosadecameros.org

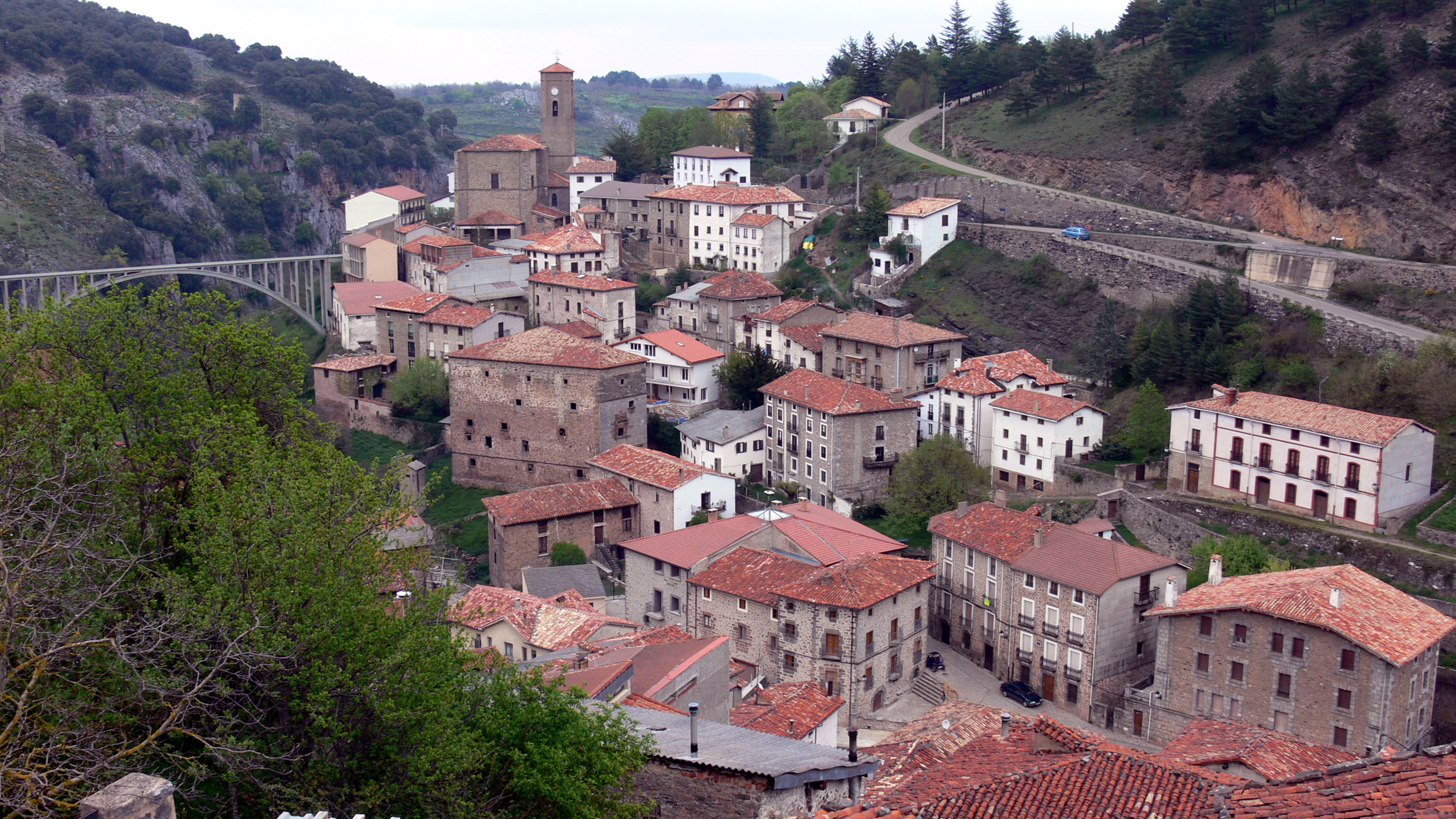

Ortigosa de Cameros is a village, one of 174 municipalities of the province and autonomous community of La Rioja, Spain. Its name comes from the Latin word urtica, which in Spanish is ortiga, which is ' nettle ' in English. The title “de Cameros,” is shared with other nearby villages. It is one of the municipalities of Camero Neuvo, one of the 12 comarcas or regions of La Rioja. (The Comarcas of Spain article explains the comarcas.) The municipality covers an area of 35.26 square kilometres (13.61 sq mi) and as of 2011 had a population of 282 people. Its economic activity is based mainly on livestock, forestry, timber industry and rural tourism. Its patron saint is the Virgen del Carmen, whose feast is celebrated on July 16 .

== Politics ==
List of mayors since the democratic elections of 1979
Term	Mayor	Political party
1979–1983	Enrique Saez de la Merced	UCD
1983–1987	Carlos Gonzalez Ortega	PR
1987–1991	Mª Asunción Beamonte San Agustín	Independent
1991–1995	Lucilio Noval Martínez	PSOE
1995–1999	Carlos Gonzalez Ortega	PP
1999–2003	Lucilio Noval Martínez	PSOE
2003–2007	Lucilio Noval Martínez	PSOE
2007–2011	Óscar Noval Martínez	PP
2011–2015	Elías Cabrera Aragón	PP
2015–2019	Carlos Gonzalez Ortega	Independent
2019–2023	n/d	n/d
2023–	n/d	n/d

== Main sights ==
=== Religious buildings ===
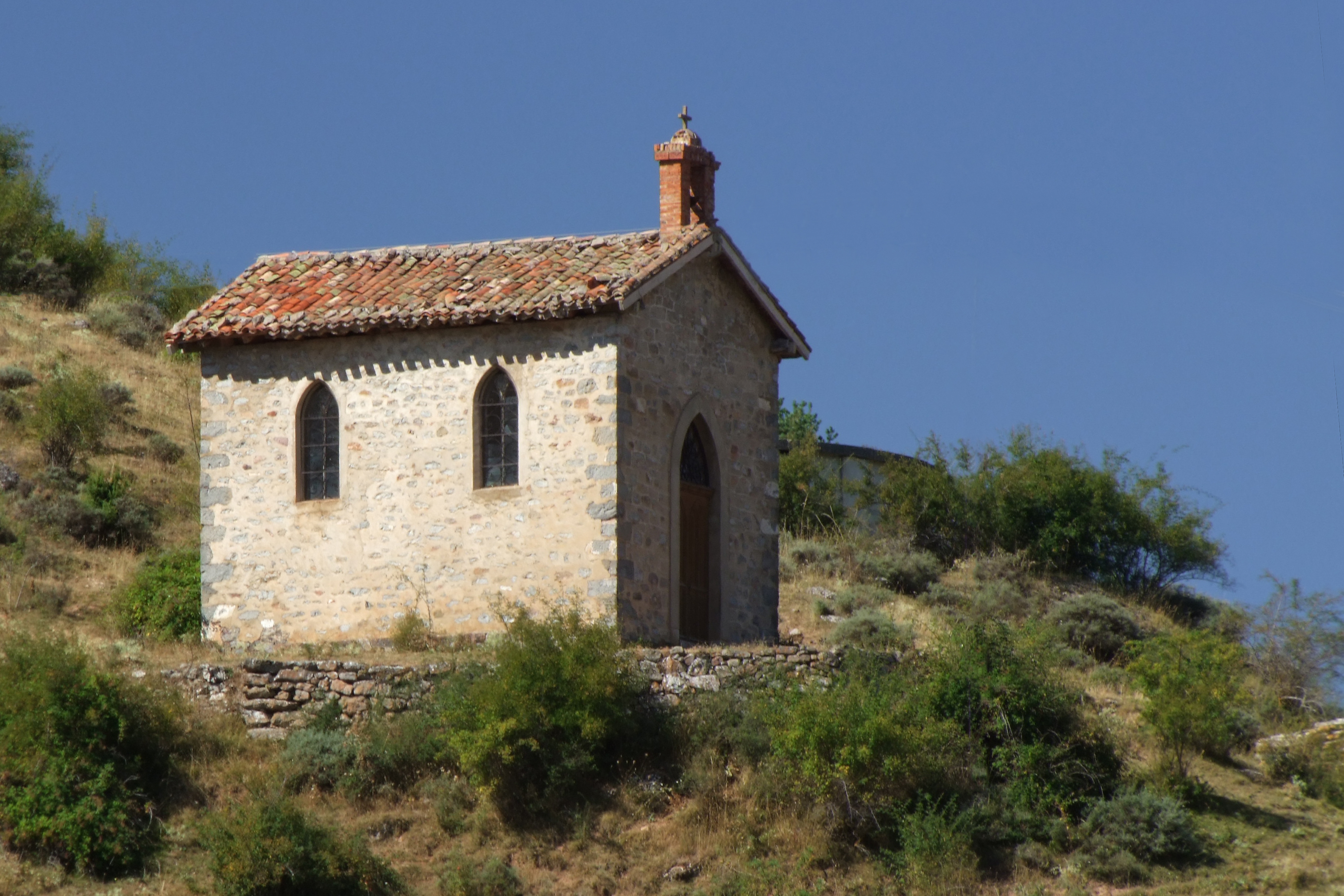
Saint Felix hermitage.

- Parish church of St Martin
- Saint Michael church
- Saint Felix hermitage
- Saint Lucy hermitage
- Buen suceso parish church

=== Civil buildings ===
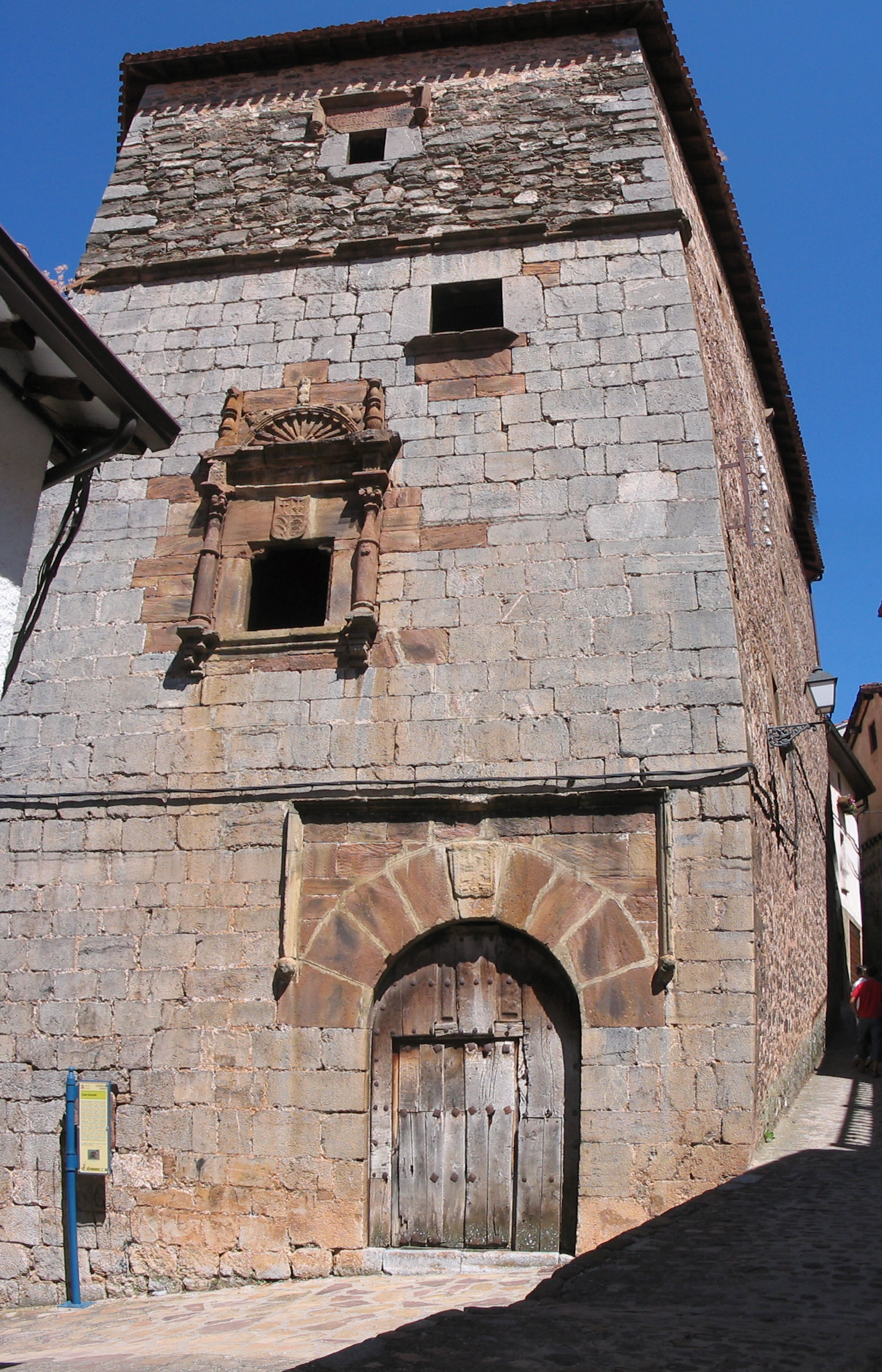
Casa Grande (ca. 1530)

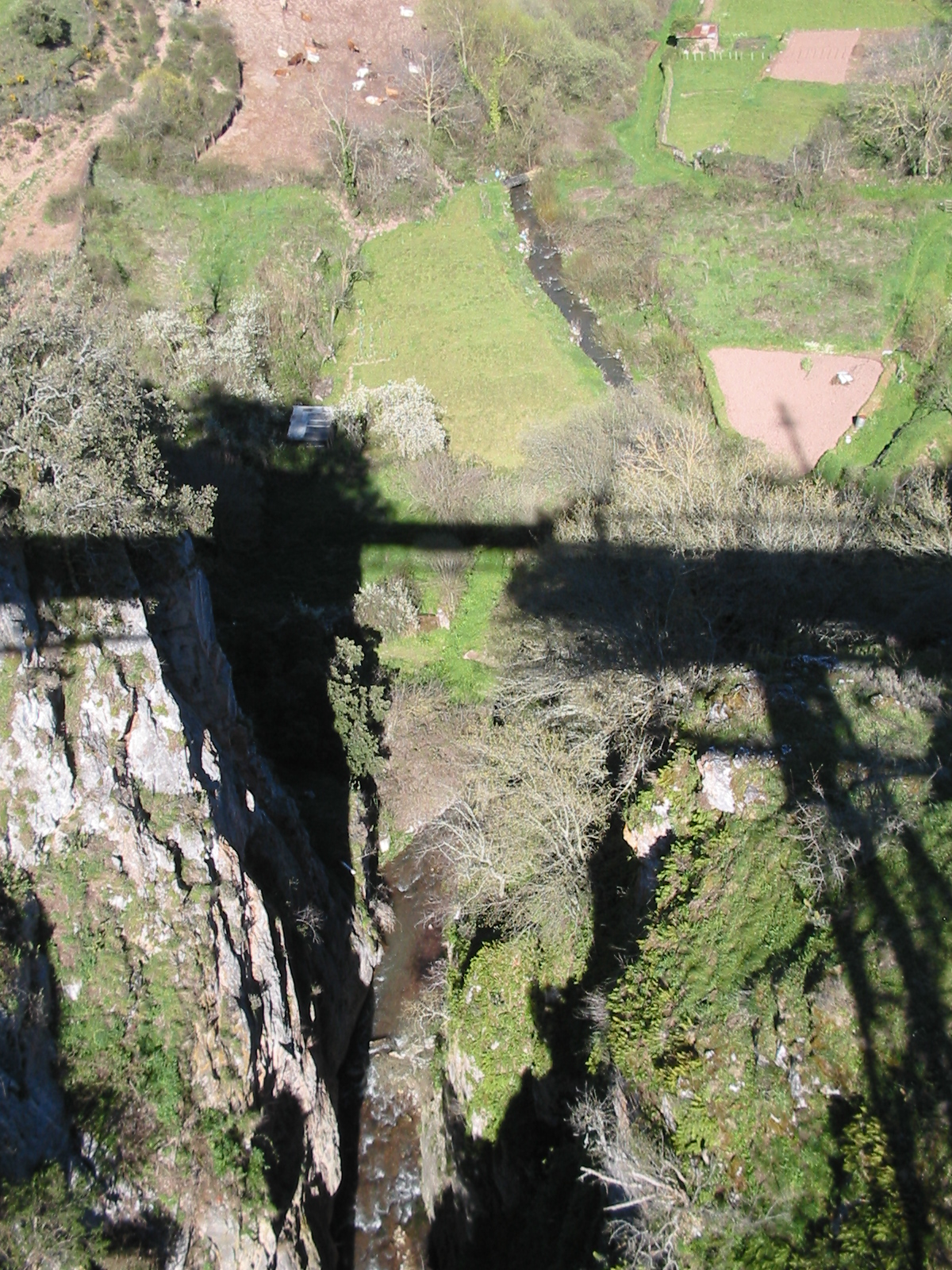
View of the Alberco river from the iron bridge.

- "La Casa Grande"
- The iron bridge
- The concrete bridge
