= Eusebio Fernández Muñiz =

Spanish businessman and sports leader (1893–1955)

President of RCD Espanyol
- In office 1922–1922
- Preceded by: Genaro de la Riva
- Succeeded by: Victorià de la Riva

Personal details
- Born: 20 July 1893; Barcelona, Catalonia, Spain
- Died: 13 October 1955 (aged 62); Avilés, Asturias, Spain

Eusebio Fernandez Muñiz (20 July 1893 – 13 October 1955) was a Spanish businessman who served as the 12th president of RCD Espanyol in 1922. He purchased the club's white and blue shirts for Avilés local club, Stadium Club Avilesino, which eventually became the colours of the flag of Avilés.

== Professional life ==
Fernández was born in Barcelona to a family from Avilés. On a professional level, Fernández was a businessman dedicated to the automobile sector, being a representative of the Catalan automotive company Hispano-Suiza in Barcelona in the 1920s. This meant that he carried out important industrial representation tasks in Barcelona. He became so involved in Catalan society that in June 1921 he was named vice president of Español de Barcelona, within a board headed by Genaro de la Riva and whose treasurer was called Eduardo Avilés.

== Presidency of RCD Espanyol ==
In January 1922, Fernandez Muñiz was appointed as the 12th president of RCD Espanyol, replacing Genaro de la Riva, while his brother Manuel was chosen as vice president. According to the newspapers of the time, he took over the presidency with the idea of transforming the Club at the level of technical and administrative organization. At a sporting level, the team faced one of the worst moments in the club's history, having to contest relegation with FC Espanya in order to stay in the category of the Catalan Championship, which they eventually ended up doing. It was under his leadership that the goalkeeper Ricardo Zamora joined their ranks. His mandate was very short as it only lasted six months, being replaced in June by Victorià de la Riva (Genaro's brother), while Eusebio and his brother became vice-presidents of the new board of directors.

== Stadium Club Avilesino ==
The flag of Avilés

Despite living in Barcelona, Fernández continued to have continuous contact with his native Avilés thanks to his courtship with a young woman from the town, Emilia Rodríguez Maribona. With the power he had in RCD Espanyol as its vice president, Fernández managed to contact the company that made the club's shirts and then purchased and acquired a set of them, brought from Barcelona, for the local club of his native Avilés, Stadium Club Avilesino, who began wearing it in the 1923–24 season, thus putting an end to its almost annual change of clothing since it had been created in 1915. When he married Rodríguez in 1924, he returned to his hometown, with extensive experience in the world of football; so much so that he joined the board of directors of Stadium Avilesino as a member to help its new president and brother-in-law, Gustavo Rodríguez Maribona, in putting an end to the kit chaos that the club had by offering a new kit: blue and white, with vertical stripes, similar to the one of Espanyol, with Fernández knowing all the commercial resources (then scarce) to do it.

In 1925, he requested and obtained the title of Real for the Avilés club, which thus became known as Real Stadium Club Avilesino.

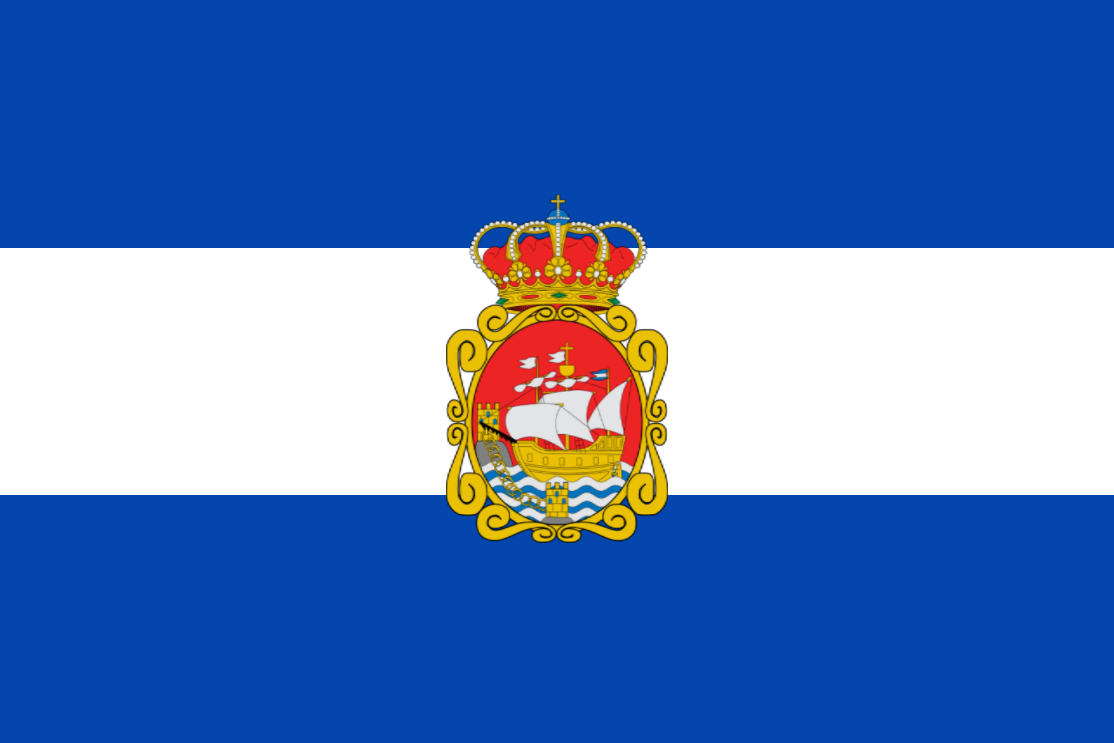
The flag of Avilés

In the mid-1920s, the Real Stadium, with its new blue and white flag, had become a very popular entity among the town's residents, to the point that candy stores filled Easter buns with small flags of the same colors to liven up both the party and the feeling they had towards the football club, which inevitably soon achieved the second category Spanish title. This feeling was so deep that the municipal authorities ended up adopting the same colors for the Avilés flag, which was hung from the balcony of the City Hall in the mid-1950s. The colors of the flag of Avilés and those of the football club Stadium Avilesino were thus inspired by the colors of RCD Espanyol (white and blue). In addition to the Real Stadium, which later became Real Avilés CF, other clubs in the town have been using these colors in their clothing as a symbol of local sentiment, either with stripes such as CF Carbayedo, Belenos RC, and Avilesino Stadium, of which Fernández was also president in July 1932.

== Death ==
Fernández died in Avilés on 13 October 1955, at the age of 62.
