= 2021–22 RCD Espanyol season =

RCD Espanyol
2021–22 season
- Owner: Rastar Group
- President: Chen Yansheng
- Head coach: Vicente Moreno (until 13 May); Luis Blanco (caretaker, from 13 May)
- Stadium: RCDE Stadium
- La Liga: 14th
- Copa del Rey: Round of 16
- Top goalscorer: League: Raúl de Tomás (17); All: Raúl de Tomás (17)
- Highest home attendance: 23,377 vs Real Madrid (3 October 2021)
- Lowest home attendance: 11,095 vs Villarreal (21 August 2021)
- Biggest win: Espanyol 2–0 Granada; Espanyol 2–0 Cádiz
- Biggest defeat: Espanyol 1–4 Real Betis
Home colours	Away colours	Third colours

The 2021–22 season was the 87th season in the existence of RCD Espanyol and the club's first season back in the top flight of Spanish football. In addition to the domestic league, Espanyol participated in this season's edition of the Copa del Rey.

== Players ==
=== First-team squad ===
As of 18 January 2022

Note: Flags indicate national team as defined under FIFA eligibility rules; some limited exceptions apply. Players may hold more than one non-FIFA nationality.

No.	Pos.	Nation	Player
1	GK	ESP	Oier
2	DF	ESP	Miguelón
3	DF	ESP	Adrià Pedrosa
4	DF	URU	Leandro Cabrera
5	DF	ESP	Fernando Calero
6	MF	ESP	Manu Morlanes (on loan from Villarreal)
7	FW	CHN	Wu Lei
8	MF	ESP	Fran Mérida
9	FW	ESP	Javi Puado
10	MF	ESP	Sergi Darder
11	FW	ESP	Raúl de Tomás
12	DF	ESP	Óscar Gil
13	GK	ESP	Diego López (vice-captain)

No.	Pos.	Nation	Player
14	MF	ESP	Óscar Melendo
15	MF	ESP	David López (captain)
16	FW	ESP	Loren Morón (on loan from Betis)
17	DF	ESP	Dídac Vilà
18	FW	BEL	Landry Dimata
20	MF	ALB	Keidi Bare
21	MF	ESP	Nico Melamed
22	MF	ESP	Aleix Vidal
23	MF	ESP	Adri Embarba
24	DF	ESP	Sergi Gómez
25	MF	VEN	Yangel Herrera (on loan from Manchester City)
—	MF	NED	Tonny Vilhena (on loan from Krasnodar)

=== Out on loan ===
Note: Flags indicate national team as defined under FIFA eligibility rules; some limited exceptions apply. Players may hold more than one non-FIFA nationality.

No.	Pos.	Nation	Player
—	DF	ESP	Víctor Gómez (at Málaga until 30 June 2022)
—	DF	RUS	Roman Tugarinov (at Telstar until 30 June 2023)
—	MF	ESP	Pol Lozano (at Girona until 30 June 2022)
—	MF	ESP	Álvaro Vadillo (at Málaga until 30 June 2022)

No.	Pos.	Nation	Player
—	FW	ESP	Josema Raigal (at UCAM Murcia until 30 June 2022)
—	FW	COL	Juan Camilo Becerra (at Ponferradina until 30 June 2022)
—	FW	ARG	Matías Vargas (at Adana Demirspor until 30 June 2022)

=== Reserve team ===
Note: Flags indicate national team as defined under FIFA eligibility rules; some limited exceptions apply. Players may hold more than one non-FIFA nationality.

No.	Pos.	Nation	Player
26	FW	ESP	Max Svensson
31	DF	ESP	Lluís Recasens
32	MF	ESP	Gori
33	DF	ESP	Álvaro García

No.	Pos.	Nation	Player
34	GK	ESP	Joan García
37	MF	ESP	Roger Martínez
39	DF	ESP	Rubén Sánchez

== Transfers ==
=== In ===
Date	Player	From	Type	Fee	Ref
30 June 2021	(Spain) Víctor Gómez	Mirandés	Loan return		
30 June 2021	(Morocco) Moha	Mirandés	Loan return		

== Pre-season and friendlies ==
Win Draw Loss Fixtures

21 July 2021 Friendly	Espanyol	0–1	Las Palmas	Cornellà de Llobregat, Spain
19:00 CEST (UTC+2)			Mújica 80'	Stadium: RCDE Stadium; Referee: Juan Antonio Manrique Antequera

24 July 2021 Friendly	Espanyol	0–2	Rayo Vallecano	Marbella, Spain
10:00 CEST (UTC+2)				Stadium: Marbella Football Center

27 July 2021 Friendly	Granada	1–1	Espanyol	Marbella, Spain
19:00 CEST (UTC+2)	Duarte 9'		De Tomás 69'	Stadium: Marbella Football Center

30 July 2021 Friendly	Cádiz	0–2	Espanyol	Marbella, Spain
18:00 CEST (UTC+2)	Osmajić (yellow card) 42'; Negredo (yellow card) 58'; Haroyan (yellow card) 66'		Darder 50'; Melamed 85'	Stadium: Marbella Football Center

7 August 2021 Unbeatables Cup	Fiorentina	0–0 (4–2 p)	Espanyol	Florence, Italy
19:00 CEST (UTC+2)				Stadium: Stadio Artemio Franchi; Referee: Massimiliano Irrati

== Competitions ==
=== Overall record ===
Competition	First match	Last match	Starting round	Final position	Record							
Competition	First match	Last match	Starting round	Final position	Pld	W	D	L	GF	GA	GD	Win %
La Liga	14 August 2021	22 May 2022	Matchday 1	14th	38	10	12	16	40	53	−13	26.32
Copa del Rey	1 December 2021	15 January 2022	First round	Round of 16	4	2	1	1	7	6	+1	50.00
Total					42	12	13	17	47	59	−12	28.57

Source: Soccerway

=== La Liga ===
==== League table ====
Pos	Team	Pld	W	D	L	GF	GA	GD	Pts
12	Rayo Vallecano	38	11	9	18	39	50	−11	42 (Note: Head-to-head points: Rayo Vallecano 9, Elche 7, Espanyol 1.)
13	Elche	38	11	9	18	40	52	−12	42
14	Espanyol	38	10	12	16	40	53	−13	42
15	Getafe	38	8	15	15	33	41	−8	39 (Note: Head-to-head points: Getafe 8, Mallorca 5, Cádiz 2.)
16	Mallorca	38	10	9	19	36	63	−27	39

Source: LaLiga Santander
Rules for classification: 1) Points; 2) Head-to-head points; 3) Head-to-head goal difference; 4) Goal difference; 5) Goals scored; 6) Fair-play points (Note: Head-to-head record is used only after all the matches between the teams in question have been played)

==== Results summary ====
Overall								Home						Away					
Pld	W	D	L	GF	GA	GD	Pts	W	D	L	GF	GA	GD	W	D	L	GF	GA	GD
38	10	12	16	40	53	−13	42	9	6	4	25	19	+6	1	6	12	15	34	−19

Source: La Liga

==== Results by round ====
Round	1	2	3	4	5	6	7	8	9	10	11	12	13	14	15	16	17	18	19	20	21	22	23	24	25	26	27	28	29	30	31	32	33	34	35	36	37	38
Ground	A	H	A	H	A	H	A	H	H	A	H	A	H	A	H	A	H	A	A	H	A	H	A	H	H	A	H	A	H	A	H	A	H	A	H	A	H	A
Result	D	D	L	L	D	W	L	W	W	D	D	L	W	L	W	L	W	L	W	L	D	L	L	D	D	L	W	D	W	L	W	L	L	L	D	L	D	D
Position	11	13	16	16	16	13	16	13	11	11	10	11	11	11	9	11	9	11	11	11	11	13	13	13	14	14	12	12	12	12	11	12	13	14	13	13	13	14

Source: La Liga
A = Away; H = Home; W = Win; D = Draw; L = Loss

==== Matches ====
The league fixtures were announced on 30 June 2021.

14 August 2021 1	Osasuna	0–0	Espanyol	Pamplona
22:00 CEST (UTC+2)	Moncayola (yellow card) 41'; U. García (yellow card) 49'; Barja (yellow card) 51'	Report	Melamed (yellow card) 13'; Gómez (yellow card) 51'; Gori (yellow card) 90'	Stadium: El Sadar; Attendance: 0 Referee: Miguel Ángel Ortiz Arias

21 August 2021 2	Espanyol	0–0	Villarreal	Cornellà de Llobregat
19:30 CEST (UTC+2)	De Tomás (yellow card) 41'; Gil (yellow card) 60'; Bare (yellow card) 90+2'	Report	Capoue (yellow card) 23'; Gómez (yellow card) 30'; Moreno (yellow card) 36'; Mandi (yellow card) 54'	Stadium: RCDE Stadium; Attendance: 11,095; Referee: Jorge Figueroa Vázquez

27 August 2021 3	Mallorca	1–0	Espanyol	Palma
20:00 CEST (UTC+2)	Niño (yellow card) 19'; Rodríguez 27'; Kubo (yellow card) 37'; Oliván (yellow card) 70'; Sedlar (yellow card) 80'	Report	Cabrera (yellow card) 31'; Morlanes (yellow card) 56'; Gómez (red card) 90+4'; Vadillo (yellow card) 90+8'	Stadium: Visit Mallorca Stadium; Attendance: 7,529; Referee: Isidro Díaz de Mera Escuderos

12 September 2021 4	Espanyol	1–2	Atlético Madrid	Cornellà de Llobregat
14:00 CEST (UTC+2)	De Tomás 40'; Melamed (yellow card) 90+11'	Report	Hermoso (yellow card) 31'; Carrasco 79', (yellow card) 90+8'; Kondogbia (yellow card) 82'; Lemar 90+9'; Félix (yellow card) 90+11'	Stadium: RCDE Stadium; Attendance: 15,321; Referee: Juan Martínez Munuera

19 September 2021 5	Real Betis	2–2	Espanyol	Seville
18:30 CEST (UTC+2)	González (yellow card) 9'; Pedrosa 41' (o.g.); Fekir 45+4', (yellow card) 90+7'; Pezzella (red card) 78'; Guardado (yellow card) 88'; Bravo (yellow card) 90+4'	Report	Vidal 16', (yellow card) 75'; Morlanes (yellow card) 37'; Pedrosa (yellow card) 74'; De Tomás (yellow card) 90'; Cabrera 90+7'	Stadium: Benito Villamarín; Attendance: 30,189; Referee: César Soto Grado

22 September 2021 6	Espanyol	1–0	Alavés	Cornellà de Llobregat
19:30 CEST (UTC+2)	De Tomás 54' (pen.); Cabrera (yellow card) 90+3'	Report	Duarte (yellow card) 53'	Stadium: RCDE Stadium; Attendance: 14,254; Referee: Mario Melero López

25 September 2021 7	Sevilla	2–0	Espanyol	Seville
18:30 CEST (UTC+2)	En-Nesyri 13'; Rakitić (yellow card) 56'; Delaney (yellow card) 65' (yellow-red card) 66'; Lamela (yellow card) 81'; Mir 87'	Report		Stadium: Ramón Sánchez Pizjuán; Attendance: 23,956; Referee: Pablo González Fuertes

3 October 2021 8	Espanyol	2–1	Real Madrid	Cornellà de Llobregat
16:15 CEST (UTC+2)	Embarba (yellow card) 11'; De Tomás 17'; Vidal 60'; Gil (yellow card) 79'	Report	Camavinga (yellow card) 29'; Benzema 71'	Stadium: RCDE Stadium; Attendance: 23,377; Referee: Guillermo Cuadra Fernández

18 October 2021 9	Espanyol	2–0	Cádiz	Cornellà de Llobregat
21:00 CEST (UTC+2)	De Tomás 45+1'; Melamed 65'; Gil (yellow card) 68'	Report		Stadium: RCDE Stadium; Attendance: 15,678; Referee: Antonio Mateu Lahoz

23 October 2021 10	Elche	2–2	Espanyol	Elche
18:30 CEST (UTC+2)	Boyé 23'; Verdú (yellow card) 34'; Benedetto 84'; Palacios (yellow card) 86'; Bigas (yellow card) 90+4'	Report	Morlanes 51'; De Tomás 52'; Di. López (yellow card) 74'	Stadium: Estadio Manuel Martínez Valero; Attendance: 13,449; Referee: Jorge Figueroa Vázquez

26 October 2021 11	Espanyol	1–1	Athletic Bilbao	Cornellà de Llobregat
21:00 CEST (UTC+2)	De Tomás 33' (pen.), (red card) 90+3'; Herrera (yellow card) 73'	Report	I. Williams 52'; Berenguer (yellow card) 75'; Yeray (yellow card) 90+3'	Stadium: RCDE Stadium; Attendance: 16,196; Referee: Miguel Ángel Ortiz Arias

31 October 2021 12	Getafe	2–1	Espanyol	Getafe
18:30 CET (UTC+1)	Mitrović (yellow card) 13'; Ünal (yellow card) 21', (goal) 31', 56'; Djené (yellow card) 62'; Maksimović (yellow card) 66'; Silva (yellow card) 70'; Suárez (yellow card) 90+2'; Mata (yellow card) 90+7'	Report	Darder (yellow card) 27'; Gómez 38'; Puado (yellow card) 69'; Pedrosa (yellow card) 88'; Bare (yellow card) 90+4'	Stadium: Coliseum Alfonso Pérez; Attendance: 4,721; Referee: Alejandro Muñiz Ruiz

6 November 2021 13	Espanyol	2–0	Granada	Cornellà de Llobregat
14:00 CET (UTC+1)	Pedrosa 30'; De Tomás 42'; Bare (yellow card) 62'	Report	Díaz (yellow card) 64'	Stadium: RCDE Stadium; Attendance: 19,050; Referee: Isidro Díaz de Mera Escuderos

20 November 2021 14	Barcelona	1–0	Espanyol	Barcelona
21:00 CET (UTC+1)	Depay 48' (pen.); Ezzalzouli (yellow card) 59'; Mingueza (yellow card) 64'; F. de Jong (yellow card) 83'; Ter Stegen (yellow card) 90'	Report	Pedrosa (yellow card) 59'; Cabrera (yellow card) 90+3'	Stadium: Camp Nou; Attendance: 74,418; Referee: Carlos del Cerro Grande

28 November 2021 15	Espanyol	1–0	Real Sociedad	Cornellà de Llobregat
16:15 CET (UTC+1)	Vidal (yellow card) 47'; Herrera 77'	Report	Sørloth (yellow card) 43'	Stadium: RCDE Stadium; Attendance: 19,935; Referee: Antonio Mateu Lahoz

5 December 2021 16	Rayo Vallecano	1–0	Espanyol	Madrid
14:00 CET (UTC+1)	Trejo (yellow card) 40'; Cabrera 54' (o.g.); Nteka (yellow card) 90'; Valentín (yellow card) 90+3'	Report	Puado (yellow card) 9'; Vidal (yellow card) 70'; Cabrera (yellow card) 90+1'; Mérida (red card) 90+3'	Stadium: Campo de Fútbol de Vallecas; Attendance: 11,879; Referee: José Luis Munuera Montero

11 December 2021 17	Espanyol	4–3	Levante	Cornellà de Llobregat
14:00 CET (UTC+1)	Darder 6'; Herrera (yellow card) 9'; Embarba (yellow card) 36'; De Tomás 49'; Vidal (yellow card) 57'; Puado 60', 76'; Bare (yellow card) 81'	Report	De Frutos 11'; Son 26', (red card) 78'; Morales 57'; Campaña (yellow card) 66'; Malsa (yellow card) 80'; Soldado (yellow card) 86'	Stadium: RCDE Stadium; Attendance: 15,193; Referee: Adrián Cordero Vega

17 December 2021 18	Celta Vigo	3–1	Espanyol	Vigo
21:00 CET (UTC+1)	Mina 3', (yellow card) 89'; Aspas 47'; Suárez 82'; Mallo (yellow card) 90+1'	Report	Didac (yellow card) 90+1'; Loren 90+2'	Stadium: Balaídos; Attendance: 9,526; Referee: Valentín Pizarro Gómez

31 December 2021 19	Valencia	1–2	Espanyol	Valencia
16:15 CEST (UTC+1)	Correia (yellow card) 12'; Guedes (yellow card) 19'; Alderete 51'; Wass (yellow card) 63'; Iranzo (yellow card) 78'; Duro (yellow card) 79' (yellow-red card) 83'; Cillessen (yellow card) 90+6'	Report	Melamed (yellow card) 30'; Gil (yellow card) 79'; De Tomás 83' (pen.); Puado 88'	Stadium: Mestalla; Attendance: 29,566; Referee: José María Sánchez Martínez

10 January 2022 20	Espanyol	1–2	Elche	Cornellà de Llobregat
21:00 CET (UTC+1)	Bare (yellow card) 22'; Pedrosa (yellow card) 30'; De Tomás 45+3' (pen.), (yellow card) 88'; Mérida (yellow card) 90+1'	Report	Milla 6', 14', (yellow card) 83'; Palacios (yellow card) 36'; Verdú (yellow card) 45+1'; Mojica (yellow card) 49'; Gumbau (yellow card) 77'; Roco (yellow card) 90'	Stadium: RCDE Stadium; Attendance: 11,870; Referee: Jesús Gil Manzano

18 January 2022 21	Cádiz	2–2	Espanyol	Cádiz
21:30 CET (UTC+1)	Fali (yellow card) 46'; Negredo 55'; Espino (yellow card) 58'; Alejo (yellow card) 74', (goal) 90+1'; Ledesma (yellow card) 81'	Report	Morlanes 10'; Cabrera (yellow card) 80'; De Tomás 90+6'	Stadium: Nuevo Mirandilla; Attendance: 10,755; Referee: Alejandro Muñiz Ruiz

21 January 2022 22	Espanyol	1–4	Real Betis	Cornellà de Llobregat
21:00 CET (UTC+1)	De Tomás 14', (yellow card) 79' (yellow-red card) 82'; Morlanes (yellow card) 60'	Report	Iglesias 31' (pen.), 53', (yellow card) 65'; Pezzella (yellow card) 33'; Rodríguez 36'; Juanmi (yellow card) 43'; Willian José 76'; Carvalho (yellow card) 79'	Stadium: RCDE Stadium; Attendance: 17,637; Referee: Javier Alberola Rojas

7 February 2022 23	Athletic Bilbao	2–1	Espanyol	Bilbao
21:00 CET (UTC+1)	Sancet 5'; Martínez 16', (yellow card) 90+3'; Vesga (yellow card) 62'; Petxarroman (yellow card) 87'	Report	Vilhena 3'; Morlanes (yellow card) 15'; Gil (yellow card) 75'	Stadium: San Mamés; Attendance: 30,753; Referee: César Soto Grado

13 February 2022 24	Espanyol	2–2	Barcelona	Cornellà de Llobregat
21:00 CET (UTC+1)	Bare (yellow card) 23'; Darder 40'; Vilhena (yellow card) 60'; De Tomás 64'; Puado (yellow card) 76'; Melamed (yellow card) 90+2' (yellow-red card) 90+3'; Morlanes (red card) 90+6'	Report	Pedri 2'; Piqué (yellow card) 74' (yellow-red card) 90+2'; García (yellow card) 78'; Nico (yellow card) 83'; L. de Jong 90+6'	Stadium: RCDE Stadium; Attendance: 25,049; Referee: Alejandro Hernández Hernández

20 February 2022 25	Espanyol	1–1	Sevilla	Cornellà de Llobregat
14:00 CET (UTC+1)	De Tomás (yellow card) 30'; Darder 50'; Puado (yellow card) 76'; Bare (yellow card) 81'; Vidal (yellow card) 90'	Report	Mir 36'; Augustinsson (yellow card) 44'; Corona (yellow card) 47'; Koundé (yellow card) 69' (yellow-red card) 76'; Ocampos (yellow card) 85'	Stadium: RCDE Stadium; Attendance: 24,897; Referee: Pablo González Fuertes

27 February 2022 26	Villarreal	5–1	Espanyol	Villarreal
14:00 CET (UTC+1)	Pino 14', 20', 45', 53'; Aurier (yellow card) 31'; Dia 86'; Albiol (yellow card) 90+3'	Report	Pedrosa (yellow card) 40'; Bare 65'	Stadium: Estadio de la Cerámica; Attendance: 15,600; Referee: Ricardo de Burgos Bengoetxea

5 March 2022 27	Espanyol	2–0	Getafe	Cornellà de Llobregat
16:15 CET (UTC+1)	Cabrera 17', (yellow card) 64'; Cabaco 27' (o.g.); Gil (yellow card) 40'; Vilhena (yellow card) 42'; Di. López (yellow card) 43'; Herrera (yellow card) 56'; Darder (yellow card) 72'	Report	Mitrović (yellow card) 2'; Ünal (yellow card) 32'; Óscar (yellow card) 56'; Djené (yellow card) 72'; Cabaco (yellow card) 78'	Stadium: RCDE Stadium; Attendance: 18,519; Referee: Adrián Cordero Vega

12 March 2022 28	Levante	1–1	Espanyol	Valencia
14:00 CET (UTC+1)	Duarte (yellow card) 35'; Melero (yellow card) 40'; Gómez 80'; Pier (yellow card) 90'; Campaña (yellow card) 90+4'	Report	Pedrosa (yellow card) 18'; Puado 50', (yellow card) 55'; Calero (yellow card) 71'; Embarba (yellow card) 90+3'	Stadium: Ciutat de València; Attendance: 13,407; Referee: Isidro Díaz De Mera Escuderos

20 March 2022 29	Espanyol	1–0	Mallorca	Cornellà de Llobregat
14:00 CET (UTC+1)	Bare (yellow card) 23'; De Tomás 42'; Morlanes (yellow card) 81'; Vidal (yellow card) 81'	Report	Costa (yellow card) 9'; Muriqi (yellow card) 37'; Raíllo (yellow card) 62'	Stadium: RCDE Stadium; Attendance: 17,578; Referee: Alejandro Muñiz Ruiz

4 April 2022 30	Real Sociedad	1–0	Espanyol	San Sebastián
21:00 CEST (UTC+2)	Rico (yellow card) 73'; Isak (yellow card) 90+1', (goal) 90+6' (pen.)	Report	Herrera (yellow card) 55'; Darder (yellow card) 76'; Vidal (yellow card) 90+5'; Pedrosa (yellow card) 90+7'	Stadium: Anoeta; Attendance: 20,869; Referee: Santiago Jaime Latre

10 April 2022 31	Espanyol	1–0	Celta Vigo	Cornellà de Llobregat
16:15 CEST (UTC+2)	Herrera (yellow card) 43'; Calero (yellow card) 45'; Bare (yellow card) 55'; Vilhena (yellow card) 81'; Wu Lei 89'	Report	Kevin (yellow card) 77'	Stadium: RCDE Stadium; Attendance: 18,471; Referee: Javier Alberola Rojas

17 April 2022 32	Atlético Madrid	2–1	Espanyol	Madrid
16:15 CEST (UTC+2)	Kondogbia (yellow card) 37' (yellow-red card) 71'; Felipe (yellow card) 45'; Carrasco 52', 90+10' (pen.); Savić (yellow card) 76'; Llorente (yellow card) 88'	Report	Gil (yellow card) 30'; Di. López (yellow card) 33'; De Tomás 74'; Vilà (yellow card) 88'; Morlanes (yellow card) 90+3'; Vidal (yellow card) 90+9'	Stadium: Wanda Metropolitano; Attendance: 54,011; Referee: Jorge Figueroa Vázquez

21 April 2022 33	Espanyol	0–1	Rayo Vallecano	Cornellà de Llobregat
19:00 CEST (UTC+2)	Embarba (yellow card) 50'; Vidal (yellow card) 86'; Cabrera (yellow card) 90+2'; Calero (yellow card) 90+4'	Report	Trejo (yellow card) 40'; Guardiola 42'; Hernández (yellow card) 46'; Comesaña (yellow card) 57'; García (yellow card) 76'	Stadium: RCDE Stadium; Attendance: 11,873; Referee: Antonio Mateu Lahoz

30 April 2022 34	Real Madrid	4–0	Espanyol	Madrid
16:15 CEST (UTC+2)	Rodrygo 33', 43'; Mariano (yellow card) 42'; Casemiro (yellow card) 46'; Asensio 55'; Benzema 81'	Report		Stadium: Santiago Bernabéu; Attendance: 58,686; Referee: José Luis Munuera Montero

8 May 2022 35	Espanyol	1–1	Osasuna	Cornellà de Llobregat
18:30 CEST (UTC+2)	Vilhena (yellow card) 28'; Melamed 67'	Report	Barja 42', (yellow card) 53'; Brašanac (yellow card) 62'; Sánchez (yellow card) 76'	Stadium: RCDE Stadium; Attendance: 18,903; Referee: Santiago Jaime Latre

11 May 2022 36	Alavés	2–1	Espanyol	Vitoria-Gasteiz
19:00 CEST (UTC+2)	Miguel 7'; Loum (yellow card) 41'; Escalante 59'; Laguardia (yellow card) 90'; Tenas (yellow card) 90+4'	Report	De Tomás 14' (pen.); Herrera (yellow card) 30' (yellow-red card) 46'; Vidal (yellow card) 40'	Stadium: Mendizorrotza; Attendance: 12,729; Referee: Valentín Pizarro Gómez

14 May 2022 37	Espanyol	1–1	Valencia	Cornellà de Llobregat
18:30 CEST (UTC+2)	Mérida (yellow card) 3'; De Tomás (yellow card) 45', (goal) 45+2'; Darder (yellow card) 70'; Vilà (yellow card) 90+2'	Report	Gómez 37'; Alderete (yellow card) 90+2'	Stadium: RCDE Stadium; Attendance: 14,990; Referee: Alejandro Muñiz Ruiz

22 May 2022 38	Granada	0–0	Espanyol	Granada
20:00 CEST (UTC+2)	Molina (penalty missed) 72'; Escudero (yellow card) 87'	Report		Stadium: Nuevo Los Cármenes; Attendance: 17,951; Referee: Alejandro Hernández Hernández

=== Copa del Rey ===
1 December 2021 First round	Solares	2–3	Espanyol	Solares
19:00 CET (UTC+1)	Viti (yellow card) 14'; Pepo (yellow card) 17'; Oslé 75'; Gutiérrez 83'	Report	Loren 15', 23', 50' (pen.); Vilà (yellow card) 82'	Stadium: La Estación; Referee: Ricardo de Burgos Bengoetxea

14 December 2021 Second round	Cristo Atlético	1–2	Espanyol	Palencia
21:00 CET (UTC+1)	Sualdea 6'; A. Pérez (yellow card) 42'; Gallardo (yellow card) 85'	Report	Wu Lei 46'; Calero (yellow card) 62'; Darder (yellow card) 75'; Gómez 88'; Vilà (yellow card) 90+4'; Morlanes (yellow card) 90+5'	Stadium: Estadio Nueva Balastera; Referee: Alejandro Muñiz Ruiz

4 January 2022 Round of 32	Ponferradina	1–1 (a.e.t.) (1–3 p)	Espanyol	Ponferrada
21:00 CET (UTC+1)	Yuri 88' (pen.), (yellow card) 90'; Pujol (yellow card) 115'	Report	Pedrosa 4'; Embarba (yellow card) 101'; Gil (yellow card) 116'	Stadium: El Toralín; Referee: Carlos del Cerro Grande
	Penalties
	Medina (penalty scored); Zalazar (penalty missed); Crespo (penalty missed); Saverio (penalty missed)		(penalty scored) Embarba; (penalty scored) Bare; (penalty scored) Mérida

15 January 2022 Round of 16	Mallorca	2–1	Espanyol	Palma
16:00 CET (UTC+1)	Costa (yellow card) 9'; Kubo 32'; Abdón 60'; Ruiz de Galarreta (yellow card) 75'; Battaglia (yellow card) 81'	Report	Pedrosa (yellow card) 17' (yellow-red card) 90+6'; Gómez (yellow card) 31'; Puado 62', (yellow card) 70'; Vidal (yellow card) 80'	Stadium: Visit Mallorca Stadium; Referee: Santiago Jaime Latre

== Statistics ==
=== Appearances and goals ===
Last updated 22 May 2022

No.	Pos	Nat	Player	Total		La Liga		Copa del Rey	
No.	Pos	Nat	Player	Apps	Goals	Apps	Goals	Apps	Goals
Goalkeepers
1	GK	(Spain) ESP	Oier	2	0	1+1	0	0	0
13	GK	(Spain) ESP	Diego López	38	0	36	0	2	0
34	GK	(Spain) ESP	Joan García	4	0	1+1	0	2	0
Defenders
2	DF	(Spain) ESP	Miguelón	4	0	1+1	0	2	0
3	DF	(Spain) ESP	Adrià Pedrosa	33	2	31	1	2	1
4	DF	(Uruguay) URU	Leandro Cabrera	40	2	37	2	3	0
5	DF	(Spain) ESP	Fernando Calero	18	0	13+3	0	2	0
12	DF	(Spain) ESP	Óscar Gil	24	0	20+2	0	1+1	0
17	DF	(Spain) ESP	Dídac Vilà	11	0	1+8	0	2	0
24	DF	(Spain) ESP	Sergi Gómez	35	2	31	1	3+1	1
31	DF	(Spain) ESP	Lluís Recasens	1	0	0+1	0	0	0
39	DF	(Spain) ESP	Rubén Sánchez	4	0	1+3	0	0	0
Midfielders
6	MF	(Spain) ESP	Manu Morlanes	30	2	11+16	2	2+1	0
8	MF	(Spain) ESP	Fran Mérida	13	0	3+7	0	2+1	0
10	MF	(Spain) ESP	Sergi Darder	39	3	36	3	2+1	0
14	MF	(Spain) ESP	Óscar Melendo	24	0	14+7	0	2+1	0
15	MF	(Spain) ESP	David López	18	0	8+10	0	0	0
19	MF	(Netherlands) NED	Tonny Vilhena	17	1	13+4	1	0	0
20	MF	(Albania) ALB	Keidi Bare	28	1	18+7	1	2+1	0
21	MF	(Spain) ESP	Nico Melamed	33	2	7+24	2	2	0
22	MF	(Spain) ESP	Aleix Vidal	34	2	21+10	2	2+1	0
23	MF	(Spain) ESP	Adri Embarba	34	0	24+8	0	1+1	0
25	MF	(Venezuela) VEN	Yangel Herrera	23	1	19+4	1	0	0
32	MF	(Spain) ESP	Gori	1	0	0+1	0	0	0
33	MF	(Spain) ESP	Álvaro García	1	0	0	0	0+1	0
40	MF	(Spain) ESP	Dani Villahermosa	1	0	0+1	0	0	0
41	MF	(Canada) CAN	Luca Koleosho	1	0	0+1	0	0	0
Forwards
7	FW	(China) CHN	Wu Lei	27	2	4+19	1	2+2	1
9	FW	(Spain) ESP	Javi Puado	33	5	26+4	4	2+1	1
11	FW	(Spain) ESP	Raúl de Tomás	36	17	33+1	17	2	0
16	FW	(Spain) ESP	Loren Morón	25	4	4+17	1	3+1	3
18	FW	(Belgium) BEL	Landry Dimata	19	0	4+13	0	1+1	0
26	FW	(Spain) ESP	Max Svensson	2	0	0	0	0+2	0
29	FW	(Spain) ESP	Jofre Carreras	4	0	0+3	0	0+1	0
Players who have made an appearance or had a squad number this season but have left the club
31	DF	(Spain) ESP	Víctor Gómez	1	0	0+1	0	0	0
19	MF	(Spain) ESP	Álvaro Vadillo	3	0	0+3	0	0	0

=== Goalscorers ===
As of 20 November 2021

Rank	Player	La Liga	Copa del Rey	Total
1	(Spain) Raúl de Tomás	7	0	7
2	(Spain) Aleix Vidal	2	0	2
3	(Uruguay) Leandro Cabrera	1	0	1
3	(Spain) Nico Melamed	1	0	1
3	(Spain) Manu Morlanes	1	0	1
3	(Spain) Sergi Gómez	1	0	1
3	(Spain) Adrià Pedrosa	1	0	1
Own goals		0	0	0
Total		14	0	14
