= 2019–20 RCD Espanyol season =

Espanyol
2019–20 season
- President: Chen Yansheng
- Head coach: David Gallego (until 7 October); Pablo Machín (from 7 October to 23 December); Abelardo (from 27 December to 27 June)
- Stadium: RCDE Stadium
- La Liga: 20th (relegated)
- Copa del Rey: Round of 32
- UEFA Europa League: Round of 32
- Top goalscorer: League: Raúl de Tomás; Wu Lei; David López (4 each); All: Facundo Ferreyra; Wu Lei (8 each)
Home colours	Away colours	Third colours

The 2019–20 RCD Espanyol season was the club's 85th season in existence and the club's 25th consecutive season in the top flight of Spanish football. In addition to the domestic league, Espanyol participated in this season's edition of the Copa del Rey, and the UEFA Europa League. The season originally covered a period from 1 July 2019 to 30 June 2020. It was extended extraordinarily beyond 30 June due to the COVID-19 pandemic in Spain.

== Players ==
=== Current squad ===
As of 7 January 2020

Note: Flags indicate national team as defined under FIFA eligibility rules; some limited exceptions apply. Players may hold more than one non-FIFA nationality.

No.	Pos.	Nation	Player
1	GK	ESP	Andrés Prieto
2	DF	ESP	Pipa
3	DF	ESP	Adrià Pedrosa
4	MF	ESP	Víctor Sánchez (vice-captain)
5	DF	BRA	Naldo
7	FW	CHN	Wu Lei
8	MF	ESP	Ander Iturraspe
9	FW	ARG	Facundo Ferreyra (on loan from Benfica)
10	MF	ESP	Sergi Darder
11	FW	ESP	Raúl de Tomás
12	FW	ARG	Jonathan Calleri (on loan from Deportivo Maldonado)
13	GK	ESP	Diego López
14	MF	ESP	Óscar Melendo
15	MF	ESP	David López (3rd captain)

No.	Pos.	Nation	Player
16	DF	ESP	Javi López (captain)
17	DF	ESP	Dídac Vilà
18	DF	URU	Leandro Cabrera
20	DF	COL	Bernardo Espinosa (on loan from Girona)
21	MF	ESP	Marc Roca
22	MF	ARG	Matías Vargas
23	FW	ESP	Adri Embarba
24	DF	ESP	Fernando Calero
25	GK	ESP	Oier Olazábal
26	MF	ESP	Pol Lozano
31	FW	ESP	Víctor Campuzano
34	DF	ESP	Víctor Gómez
—	DF	FRA	Sébastien Corchia (on loan from Sevilla)

=== Reserve team ===
Note: Flags indicate national team as defined under FIFA eligibility rules; some limited exceptions apply. Players may hold more than one non-FIFA nationality.

No.	Pos.	Nation	Player
1	GK	ESP	Adrián López
2	DF	ESP	Carles Soria
3	DF	ESP	Nil Jiménez
4	DF	ESP	Iago Indias (vice-captain)
5	DF	ESP	Nacho González
6	MF	ESP	Marc Manchón (captain)
7	FW	ESP	Salvans
8	MF	ESP	Dami
9	FW	ESP	Alberto Fernández
11	MF	MAR	Moha
12	FW	CMR	Kévin Soni (loan from Girona)

No.	Pos.	Nation	Player
13	GK	ESP	Adri Rojas
14	MF	ESP	Ferri
15	MF	ECU	Josimar Quintero
16	DF	RUS	Roman Tugarinov
17	FW	ESP	Pau Martínez
18	MF	ESP	Iván Gil
19	DF	ESP	Ricard Pujol
22	DF	ESP	Víctor Gómez
23	MF	ESP	Nico Melamed
25	GK	ESP	Joan García

=== Out on loan ===
Note: Flags indicate national team as defined under FIFA eligibility rules; some limited exceptions apply. Players may hold more than one non-FIFA nationality.

No.	Pos.	Nation	Player
—	DF	ESP	Lluís López (at Tenerife until 30 June 2020)
—	MF	ESP	Álex López (at Lugo until 30 June 2020)
—	FW	ESP	Javi Puado (at Real Zaragoza until 30 June 2020)

No.	Pos.	Nation	Player
—	–		Reserve team players on loan:
—	DF	ESP	Guillem Corominas (at Horta until 30 June 2020)
—	DF	ESP	Genar Fornés (at L'Hospitalet until 30 June 2020)
—	FW	ESP	Ferran Brugué (at Sant Andreu until 30 June 2020)
—	FW	ESP	Óscar Gómez (at Pobla Mafumet until 30 June 2020)
—	FW	ESP	Dani Ribelles (at Horta until 30 June 2020)

== Transfers ==
=== In ===
Date	Player	From	Type	Fee	Ref
30 June 2019	(Spain) Pipa	Gimnàstic	Loan return		
30 June 2019	(Spain) Álvaro Vázquez	Zaragoza	Loan return		
6 July 2019	(Colombia) Bernardo Espinosa	Girona	Loan		
8 July 2019	(Spain) Ander Iturraspe	Athletic Bilbao	Transfer	Free	
14 July 2019	(Argentina) Matías Vargas	(Argentina) Vélez Sarsfield	Transfer	€10.5M	
19 July 2019	(Spain) Andrés Prieto	Leganés	Transfer	Free	
9 August 2019	(Spain) Fernando Calero	Valladolid	Transfer	€8M	
9 January 2020	(Spain) Raúl de Tomás	(Portugal) Benfica	Transfer	€20M	
20 January 2020	(Uruguay) Leandro Cabrera	Getafe	Transfer	€9M	
23 January 2020	(Spain) Adri Embarba	Rayo Vallecano	Transfer	€10M	

=== Out ===
Date	Player	To	Type	Fee	Ref
30 June 2019	(Venezuela) Roberto Rosales	Málaga	Loan return		
30 June 2019	(Guinea-Bissau) Alfa Semedo	(Portugal) Benfica	Loan return		
1 July 2019	(Spain) Aarón Martín	(Germany) Mainz 05	Buyout clause	€6M	
1 July 2019	(Spain) Roberto	(England) West Ham United	Transfer	Free	
10 July 2019	(Spain) Álvaro Vázquez	Sporting Gijón	Transfer	Free	
18 July 2019	(Spain) Mario Hermoso	Atlético Madrid	Transfer	€25M	
23 July 2019	(Paraguay) Hernán Pérez	(Qatar) Al Ahli	Transfer	Undisclosed	
1 August 2019	(Costa Rica) Óscar Duarte	Levante	Transfer	Free	
14 August 2019	(Spain) Borja Iglesias	Real Betis	Transfer	€28M	
16 November 2019	(Spain) Javi Puado	Zaragoza	Loan		
7 January 2020	(Argentina) Pablo Piatti	(Canada) Toronto FC	Transfer	Undisclosed	

== Pre-season and friendlies ==
Win Draw Loss

16 July 2019 Friendly	Peralada	0–6	Espanyol	Peralada, Spain
20:30 CEST (UTC+2)				Stadium: Estadi Municipal De Peralada

20 July 2019 Friendly	Lens	1–3	Espanyol	Lens, France
20:00 CEST (UTC+2)				Stadium: Stade Bollaert-Delelis

28 July 2019 Friendly	Sheffield Wednesday	2–2	Espanyol	Owlerton, England
15:00 BST (UTC+1)	Fletcher 24'; Forestieri 79' (pen.)		Puado 29'; Wu Lei 86'	Stadium: Hillsborough Stadium

== Competitions ==
Win Draw Loss

=== Overview ===
Competition	First match	Last match	Starting round	Final position	Record							
Competition	First match	Last match	Starting round	Final position	Pld	W	D	L	GF	GA	GD	Win %
La Liga	18 August 2019	19 July 2020	Matchday 1	20th	38	5	10	23	27	58	−31	13.16
Copa del Rey	19 December 2019	22 January 2020	First round	Round of 32	3	2	0	1	4	2	+2	66.67
Europa League	25 July 2019	27 February 2020	Second qualifying round	Round of 32	14	9	3	2	32	13	+19	64.29
Total					55	16	13	26	63	73	−10	29.09

Last updated: 19 July 2020
Source: Soccerway

=== La Liga ===
Pos	Team	Pld	W	D	L	GF	GA	GD	Pts	Qualification or relegation
16	Alavés	38	10	9	19	34	59	−25	39	
17	Celta Vigo	38	7	16	15	37	49	−12	37	
18	Leganés (R)	38	8	12	18	30	51	−21	36	Relegation to Segunda División
19	Mallorca (R)	38	9	6	23	40	65	−25	33	Relegation to Segunda División
20	Espanyol (R)	38	5	10	23	27	58	−31	25	Relegation to Segunda División

Source: La Liga, Soccerway
Rules for classification: 1) Points; 2) Head-to-head points; 3) Head-to-head goal difference; 4) Goal difference; 5) Goals scored; 6) Fair-play points (Note: Head-to-head record is used only after all the matches between the teams in question have been played)
(R) Relegated

==== Results summary ====
Overall								Home						Away					
Pld	W	D	L	GF	GA	GD	Pts	W	D	L	GF	GA	GD	W	D	L	GF	GA	GD
38	5	10	23	27	58	−31	25	2	6	11	15	31	−16	3	4	12	12	27	−15

Last updated: 19 July 2020.
Source: LaLiga.es

==== Results by round ====
Round	1	2	3	4	5	6	7	8	9	10	11	12	13	14	15	16	17	18	19	20	21	22	23	24	25	26	27	28	29	30	31	32	33	34	35	36	37	38
Ground	H	A	H	A	H	A	H	A	H	A	A	H	A	H	H	A	H	A	H	A	H	A	H	A	A	H	A	H	A	H	A	H	A	H	A	H	A	H
Result	L	D	L	W	L	D	L	L	L	W	L	L	L	D	L	L	D	L	D	W	D	L	W	D	L	D	L	W	D	L	L	L	L	L	L	L	L	D
Position	20	18	19	17	18	18	18	19	19	19	19	19	19	19	19	20	20	20	20	20	20	20	20	20	20	20	20	20	19	20	20	20	20	20	20	20	20	20

Updated to match(es) played on 19 July 2020. Source: LaLiga.es
A = Away; H = Home; W = Win; D = Draw; L = Loss

==== Matches ====
The La Liga schedule was announced on 4 July 2019.

18 August 2019 1	Espanyol	0–2	Sevilla	Cornellà de Llobregat
19:00 CEST (UTC+2)	Sánchez (yellow card) 52'; Vargas (yellow card) 59'	Report	Reguilón (yellow card) 39', (goal) 44'; Ocampos (yellow card) 50'; Nolito 86'	Stadium: RCDE Stadium; Attendance: 19,832; Referee: Juan Martínez Munuera

25 August 2019 2	Alavés	0–0	Espanyol	Vitoria-Gasteiz
17:00 CEST (UTC+2)	Pina (yellow card) 7'; Wakaso (yellow card) 40'; Vidal (yellow card) 83'	Report	Vilà (yellow card) 55'	Stadium: Mendizorrotza Stadium; Attendance: 14,567; Referee: Eduardo Prieto Iglesias

1 September 2019 3	Espanyol	0–3	Granada	Cornellà de Llobregat
19:00 CEST (UTC+2)	Corchia (yellow card) 2'; Naldo (yellow card) 40'	Report	Puertas 13'; Herrera (yellow card) 31'; Fernández 68', (yellow card) 84'; Azeez 74'; Montoro (yellow card) 80'	Stadium: RCDE Stadium; Attendance: 20,870; Referee: César Soto Grado

15 September 2019 4	Eibar	1–2	Espanyol	Eibar
12:00 CEST (UTC+2)	José Ángel (yellow card) 25'; Ramis 58'; Expósito (yellow card) 69'	Report	Naldo (yellow card) 48' (yellow-red card) 90+1'; Roca (yellow card) 61'; Ferreyra 76'; Granero 79'; Pedrosa (yellow card) 90+6'	Stadium: Ipurua; Attendance: 5,410; Referee: Valentín Pizarro Gómez

22 September 2019 5	Espanyol	1–3	Real Sociedad	Cornellà de Llobregat
14:00 CEST (UTC+2)	Granero (yellow card) 27'; Zaldúa 71' (o.g.)	Report	Willian José 18', 34'; Isak 75'	Stadium: RCDE Stadium; Attendance: 19,173; Referee: Adrián Cordero Vega

26 September 2019 6	Celta Vigo	1–1	Espanyol	Vigo
20:00 CEST (UTC+2)	Lobotka (yellow card) 44'; Aspas (yellow card) 90+2'; Mina 90+5'	Report	Calero (yellow card) 32'; Pedrosa 48'; Naldo (yellow card) 70'; Pipa (yellow card) 73'; Sánchez (yellow card) 80'; Calleri (yellow card) 87'	Stadium: Abanca-Balaídos; Attendance: 16,361; Referee: José María Sánchez Martínez

29 September 2019 7	Espanyol	0–2	Valladolid	Cornellà de Llobregat
12:00 CEST (UTC+2)	Sánchez (yellow card) 23'; J. López (yellow card) 35'; Calero (red card) 65'	Report	Míchel 25' (pen.); Plano 90+4'	Stadium: RCDE Stadium; Attendance: 20,911; Referee: Guillermo Cuadra Fernández

6 October 2019 8	Mallorca	2–0	Espanyol	Palma
12:00 CEST (UTC+2)	Budimir 37'; Sevilla (yellow card) 64', (goal) 73'	Report	Sánchez (yellow card) 4'; L. López (yellow card) 61'; Naldo (yellow card) 62'	Stadium: Estadi de Son Moix; Attendance: 15,052; Referee: Ricardo de Burgos Bengoetxea

20 October 2019 9	Espanyol	0–1	Villarreal	Cornellà de Llobregat
16:00 CEST (UTC+2)	Espinosa (yellow card) 90+3'; Di. López (yellow card) 90+6'	Report	Toko Ekambi 17'; Iborra (yellow card) 51'	Stadium: RCDE Stadium; Attendance: 20,653; Referee: Carlos del Cerro Grande

27 October 2019 10	Levante	0–1	Espanyol	Valencia
16:00 CET (UTC+1)	Clerc (yellow card) 78'; Miramón (yellow card) 90+1'	Report	Espinosa 38'; Naldo (yellow card) 42'; Víctor (yellow card) 65'; Campuzano (yellow card) 90+4'	Stadium: Estadi Ciutat de València; Attendance: 18,934; Referee: Pablo González Fuertes

30 October 2019 11	Athletic Bilbao	3–0	Espanyol	Bilbao
20:00 CET (UTC+1)	Muniain 4', 17'; Gómez 79' (o.g.)	Report	Espinosa (yellow card) 53'	Stadium: San Mamés; Attendance: 37,094; Referee: Juan Martínez Munuera

2 November 2019 12	Espanyol	1–2	Valencia	Cornellà de Llobregat
13:00 CET (UTC+1)	Roca 31' (pen.)	Report	Kondogbia (yellow card) 30'; Parejo 69' (pen.); Gómez 80'	Stadium: RCDE Stadium; Attendance: 18,428; Referee: Valentín Pizarro Gómez

10 November 2019 13	Atlético Madrid	3–1	Espanyol	Madrid
16:00 CET (UTC+1)	Correa 45+1'; Morata 58'; Saúl (yellow card) 60'; Partey (yellow card) 85'; Koke 90+2'	Report	Darder 38'; Naldo (yellow card) 45+4'; Campuzano (yellow card) 65'	Stadium: Wanda Metropolitano; Attendance: 53,069; Referee: Jesús Gil Manzano

24 November 2019 14	Espanyol	1–1	Getafe	Cornellà de Llobregat
12:00 CET (UTC+1)	Wu Lei 45', (yellow card) 56'; Roca (yellow card) 71'; Granero (yellow card) 80'	Report	Mata 3', (yellow card) 29'; Arambarri (yellow card) 54'; Cucurella (yellow card) 56'; Molina (yellow card) 90+1'	Stadium: RCDE Stadium; Attendance: 21,059; Referee: Pablo González Fuertes

1 December 2019 15	Espanyol	2–4	Osasuna	Cornellà de Llobregat
16:00 CET (UTC+1)	Roca 20' (pen.); Sánchez (yellow card) 27'; Calleri 90+3'	Report	Roncaglia (yellow card) 19' (yellow-red card) 52'; R. García 46', (yellow card) 80'; Ávila 49'; Moncayola 84', (yellow card) 90'; Torres 90+2' (pen.)	Stadium: RCDE Stadium; Attendance: 21,238; Referee: Mario Melero López

7 December 2019 16	Real Madrid	2–0	Espanyol	Madrid
13:00 CET (UTC+1)	Vinícius (yellow card) 17'; Varane 37'; Mendy (yellow card) 63' (yellow-red card) 83'; Valverde (yellow card) 74'; Benzema 79'	Report	Granero (yellow card) 15'; Calero (yellow card) 61'; Darder (yellow card) 90+1'	Stadium: Santiago Bernabéu; Attendance: 64,125; Referee: Santiago Jaime Latre

15 December 2019 17	Espanyol	2–2	Real Betis	Cornellà de Llobregat
16:00 CET (UTC+1)	Granero (yellow card) 15'; Darder 19'; Calero (yellow card) 31'; Espinosa 41', (yellow card) 85'; Ferreyra (yellow card) 90+3'	Report	Iglesias 4'; Bartra 68'; Feddal (yellow card) 80'	Stadium: RCDE Stadium; Attendance: 22,248; Referee: Guillermo Cuadra Fernández

22 December 2019 18	Leganés	2–0	Espanyol	Leganés
12:00 CET (UTC+1)	Braithwaite 11'; En-Nesyri 54'; Awaziem (yellow card) 68'	Report	Calero (yellow card) 25'; Granero (yellow card) 45+1'; Roca (yellow card) 74'; Vilà (yellow card) 76'; Ferreyra (yellow card) 90+3'; Da. López (yellow card) 90+4'	Stadium: Estadio Municipal de Butarque; Attendance: 10,183; Referee: Javier Alberola Rojas

4 January 2020 19	Espanyol	2–2	Barcelona	Cornellà de Llobregat
21:00 CET (UTC+1)	Da. López 23'; J. López (yellow card) 35'; Roca (yellow card) 62'; Wu Lei 88'	Report	Suárez 50'; Vidal 59'; De Jong (yellow card) 66' (yellow-red card) 75'	Stadium: RCDE Stadium; Attendance: 33,562; Referee: Carlos del Cerro Grande

19 January 2020 20	Villarreal	1–2	Espanyol	Villarreal
16:00 CET (UTC+1)	Trigueros (yellow card) 41'; Cazorla 62' (pen.)	Report	Da. López 5'; Vilà (yellow card) 24'; J. López (yellow card) 32' (red card) 59'; De Tomás 47', (yellow card) 76'	Stadium: Estadio de la Cerámica; Attendance: 12,053; Referee: Pablo González Fuertes

25 January 2020 21	Espanyol	1–1	Athletic Bilbao	Cornellà de Llobregat
13:00 CET (UTC+1)	Sánchez (yellow card) 17'; Roca (yellow card) 56'; Espinosa (yellow card) 59'; De Tomás 63'	Report	Vesga (yellow card) 9'; Villalibre 12'	Stadium: RCDE; Attendance: 27,542; Referee: José María Sánchez Martínez

1 February 2020 22	Granada	2–1	Espanyol	Granada
13:00 CET (UTC+1)	Soldado (yellow card) 29'; Machís 38'; Fernández 46'; Sánchez (yellow card) 48'; Gonalons (yellow card) 49'	Report	De Tomás 27' (pen.); Iturraspe (yellow card) 55'; Da. López (yellow card) 88'; Vilà (yellow card) 90+3'	Stadium: Nuevo Estadio de Los Cármenes; Attendance: 15,226; Referee: Guillermo Cuadra Fernández

9 February 2020 23	Espanyol	1–0	Mallorca	Cornellà de Llobregat
12:00 CET (UTC+1)	Prieto (yellow card) 6'; Vilà (yellow card) 39'; Di. López (yellow card) 54'; De Tomás 58'; Cabrera (yellow card) 70'; Sánchez (yellow card) 80'; Gómez (yellow card) 90+4'	Report	Sevilla (yellow card) 61'; Lumor (yellow card) 87'	Stadium: RCDE Stadium; Attendance: 32,084; Referee: Antonio Mateu Lahoz

16 February 2020 24	Sevilla	2–2	Espanyol	Seville
12:00 CET (UTC+1)	Ocampos 15'; Gómez (yellow card) 33'; Gudelj (yellow card) 58'; Suso 80'	Report	Embarba 35'; Wu Lei (yellow card) 38', (goal) 50'; Sánchez (yellow card) 49' (yellow-red card) 69'; Roca (yellow card) 84'	Stadium: Ramón Sánchez Pizjuán; Attendance: 35,661; Referee: Adrián Cordero Vega

23 February 2020 25	Valladolid	2–1	Espanyol	Valladolid
16:00 CET (UTC+1)	Sandro 77'; Guardiola 83'; García (yellow card) 88'	Report	Da. López (yellow card) 16' (yellow-red card) 25'; Roca (yellow card) 36'; Embarba (yellow card) 79', (goal) 90+3' (pen.); Darder (yellow card) 88'	Stadium: Estadio José Zorrilla; Attendance: 19,645; Referee: Eduardo Prieto Iglesias

1 March 2020 26	Espanyol	1–1	Atlético Madrid	Cornellà de Llobregat
16:00 CET (UTC+1)	Savić 24' (o.g.); Embarba (yellow card) 38'; Sánchez (yellow card) 90'; López (yellow card) 90+2'	Report	Felipe (yellow card) 6'; Partey (yellow card) 42'; Saúl 46'; Koke (yellow card) 86'; Lodi (yellow card) 90'	Stadium: RCDE Stadium; Attendance: 28,872; Referee: Javier Alberola Rojas

8 March 2020 27	Osasuna	1–0	Espanyol	Pamplona
12:00 CET (UTC+1)	Torres 51' (pen.); R. García (yellow card) 77'; Oier (yellow card) 88'; Pérez (yellow card) 90+4'	Report	Di. López (yellow card) 60' (yellow-red card) 83'; Calleri (yellow card) 73'	Stadium: El Sadar; Attendance: 15,737; Referee: Ricardo de Burgos Bengoetxea

13 June 2020 28	Espanyol	2–0	Alavés	Cornellà de Llobregat
14:00 CEST (UTC+2)	Embarba (yellow card) 4'; Wu Lei (yellow card) 26', (goal) 47'; Espinosa 45+3'; De Tomás (yellow card) 73'; Calleri (yellow card) 86'	Report	Pacheco (red card) 19'; Laguardia (yellow card) 52'; Rioja (yellow card) 65'; Burke (yellow card) 78'	Stadium: RCDE Stadium; Attendance: 0 Referee: Pablo González Fuertes
Note: The match was originally scheduled for 15 March, but was postponed due to the COVID-19 pandemic, and rescheduled to 13 June. It was played behind closed doors.

16 June 2020 29	Getafe	0–0	Espanyol	Getafe
19:30 CEST (UTC+2)	Olivera (yellow card) 12'; Cucurella (yellow card) 63'; Chema (yellow card) 78'	Report	Calleri (yellow card) 3'; Espinosa (red card) 16'; Di. López (yellow card) 86'	Stadium: Coliseum Alfonso Pérez; Attendance: 0 Referee: José Luis Munuera Montero
Note: The match was originally scheduled for 22 March, but was postponed due to the 2020 coronavirus pandemic, and rescheduled to 16 June. It was played behind closed doors.

20 June 2020 30	Espanyol	1–3	Levante	Cornellà de Llobregat
14:00 CEST (UTC+2)	Cabrera (yellow card) 16'; Da. López 28'; Vilà (yellow card) 37'	Report	Mayoral 14'; Bardhi 67'; Pedrosa 87' (o.g.)	Stadium: RCDE Stadium; Attendance: 0 Referee: Carlos del Cerro Grande
Note: The match was originally scheduled for 5 April, but was postponed due to the 2020 coronavirus pandemic, and rescheduled to 20 June. It was played behind closed doors.

25 June 2020 31	Real Betis	1–0	Espanyol	Seville
22:00 CEST (UTC+2)	Rodríguez (yellow card) 28'; Bartra 48'; Pedraza (yellow card) 69'; Iglesias (yellow card) 76'; Emerson (yellow card) 82'	Report	Pipa (yellow card) 10'; Pedrosa (yellow card) 35'; Naldo (yellow card) 73'; Darder (yellow card) 79'	Stadium: Benito Villamarín; Attendance: 0 Referee: Juan Martínez Munuera
Note: The match was originally scheduled for 12 April, but was postponed due to the 2020 coronavirus pandemic, and rescheduled to 25 June. It was played behind closed doors.

28 June 2020 32	Espanyol	0–1	Real Madrid	Cornellà de Llobregat
22:00 CEST (UTC+2)	Pedrosa (yellow card) 68'	Report	Casemiro 45'; Vinícius (yellow card) 87'	Stadium: RCDE Stadium; Attendance: 0 Referee: Antonio Mateu Lahoz
Note: The match was originally scheduled for 22 April, but was postponed due to the 2020 coronavirus pandemic, and rescheduled to 28 June. It was played behind closed doors.

2 July 2020 33	Real Sociedad	2–1	Espanyol	San Sebastián
19:30 CEST (UTC+2)	Zubeldia (yellow card) 37'; Zubimendi (yellow card) 50'; Willian José 56'; Isak 84'	Report	Da. López 10'; Nico (yellow card) 34'	Stadium: Anoeta; Attendance: 0 Referee: José María Sánchez Martínez
Note: The match was originally scheduled for 26 April, but was postponed due to the 2020 coronavirus pandemic, and rescheduled to 2 July. It was played behind closed doors.

5 July 2020 34	Espanyol	0–1	Leganés	Cornellà de Llobregat
17:00 CEST (UTC+2)	De Tomás (yellow card) 51'; Darder (yellow card) 86'; Calleri (yellow card) 88' (yellow-red card) 88'	Report	Silva 53'; Assalé (yellow card) 67'; Siovas (yellow card) 84'; Avilés (yellow card) 90+1'	Stadium: RCDE Stadium; Attendance: 0 Referee: Guillermo Cuadra Fernández
Note: The match was originally scheduled for 3 May, but was postponed due to the 2020 coronavirus pandemic, and rescheduled to 5 July. It was played behind closed doors.

8 July 2020 35	Barcelona	1–0	Espanyol	Barcelona
22:00 CEST (UTC+2)	Fati (red card) 50'; Suárez 56'	Report	De Tomás (yellow card) 45'; Lozano (red card) 53'; Da. López (yellow card) 90+4'	Stadium: Camp Nou; Attendance: 0 Referee: José Luis Munuera Montero
Note: The match was originally scheduled for 10 May, but was postponed due to the 2020 coronavirus pandemic, and rescheduled to 8 July. It was played behind closed doors.

12 July 2020 36	Espanyol	0–2	Eibar	Cornellà de Llobregat
14:00 CEST (UTC+2)	Vilà (yellow card) 52'; Roca (yellow card) 58'	Report	Expósito 25' (pen.), 36'; Tejero (yellow card) 65'; Enrich (yellow card) 76'	Stadium: RCDE Stadium; Attendance: 0 Referee: Carlos del Cerro Grande
Note: The match was originally scheduled for 13 May, but was postponed due to the 2020 coronavirus pandemic, and rescheduled to 12 July. It was played behind closed doors.

16 July 2020 37	Valencia	1–0	Espanyol	Valencia
21:00 CEST (UTC+2)	Gameiro 17'; Diakhaby (yellow card) 59'; Coquelin (yellow card) 80'; Costa (red card) 90+2'	Report	Pipa (yellow card) 39'; De Tomás (yellow card) 65'; Vilà (yellow card) 69'; Espinosa (yellow card) 81'	Stadium: Mestalla; Attendance: 0 Referee: Eduardo Prieto Iglesias
Note: The match was originally scheduled for 17 May, but was postponed due to the 2020 coronavirus pandemic, and rescheduled to 16 July. It was played behind closed doors.

19 July 2020 38	Espanyol	0–0	Celta Vigo	Cornellà de Llobregat
21:00 CEST (UTC+2)	Vilà (yellow card) 89'; Embarba (yellow card) 90+2'	Report	Bradarić (yellow card) 26'; Olaza (yellow card) 65'; Jacobo (yellow card) 90'	Stadium: RCDE Stadium; Attendance: 0 Referee: Adrián Cordero Vega
Note: The match was originally scheduled for 24 May, but was postponed due to the 2020 coronavirus pandemic, and rescheduled to 19 July. It was played behind closed doors.

=== Copa del Rey ===
19 December 2019 First round	Lleida Esportiu	0–2	Espanyol	Lleida
19:00 CET (UTC+1)		Report	Wu Lei 53', 90+1'	Stadium: Camp d'Esports; Attendance: 3,000; Referee: Antonio Mateu Lahoz

12 January 2020 Second round	San Sebastián de los Reyes	0–2	Espanyol	San Sebastián de los Reyes
12:00 CET (UTC+1)	Sáez (yellow card) 18' (yellow-red card) 50'; Estellés (yellow card) 77'	Report	Calleri 45+1'; Calero (yellow card) 64'; Espinosa (yellow card) 83'; De Tomás 85'	Stadium: Nuevo Matapiñonera; Attendance: 2,800; Referee: Juan Martínez Munuera

22 January 2020 Round of 32	Real Sociedad	2–0	Espanyol	San Sebastián
21:00 CET (UTC+1)	Merino (yellow card) 25'; Guevara (yellow card) 40'; Barrenetxea 45+1'; Muñoz (yellow card) 54'; Isak 62'	Report	Wu Lei (yellow card) 20'; Lozano (yellow card) 37'; J. López (yellow card) 68'	Stadium: Anoeta; Attendance: 21,647; Referee: Alejandro Hernández Hernández

=== UEFA Europa League ===
==== Second qualifying round ====
25 July 2019 First leg	Espanyol (Spain)	4–0	(Iceland) Stjarnan	Cornellà de Llobregat, Spain
21:00 CEST (UTC+2)	Ferreyra 49', 57'; Iglesias 60', 68'	Report		Stadium: RCDE Stadium; Attendance: 19,122; Referee: Alain Durieux (Luxembourg)

1 August 2019 Second leg	Stjarnan (Iceland)	1–3 (1–7 agg.)	(Spain) Espanyol	Garðabær, Iceland
21:15 CEST (UTC+2)	Héðinsson (yellow card) 78'; Sigurðsson 87'	Report	Pedrosa 5'; Iglesias 52'; Sánchez (yellow card) 60'; Ferreyra 79'	Stadium: Stjörnuvöllur; Attendance: 1,020; Referee: Dumitru Muntean (Moldova)

==== Third qualifying round ====
8 August 2019 First leg	Luzern (Switzerland)	0–3	(Spain) Espanyol	Lucerne, Switzerland
21:00 CEST (UTC+2)	Ndenge (yellow card) 12'; Eleke (yellow card) 27'	Report	Pedrosa (yellow card) 14'; Ferreyra 28'; Vilà 59', (yellow card) 74'; Sánchez (yellow card) 63'; Vargas 89'	Stadium: Swissporarena; Attendance: 9,191; Referee: Fran Jović (Croatia)

15 August 2019 Second leg	Espanyol (Spain)	3–0 (6–0 agg.)	(Switzerland) Luzern	Cornellà de Llobregat, Spain
21:00 CEST (UTC+2)	Wu Lei 3'; Campuzano 27', 38'	Report	Arnold (yellow card) 33'	Stadium: RCDE Stadium; Attendance: 13,214; Referee: Jorge Sousa (Portugal)

==== Play-off round ====
22 August 2019 First leg	Espanyol (Spain)	3–1	(Ukraine) Zorya Luhansk	Cornellà de Llobregat, Spain
21:00 CEST (UTC+2)	Ferreyra (yellow card) 21', (goal) 58'; J. López 79'; Vargas 81'	Report	Abu Hanna (yellow card) 24'; Kocherhin 38'; Hromov (yellow card) 45+4'	Stadium: RCDE Stadium; Attendance: 13,686; Referee: Tobias Stieler (Germany)

29 August 2019 Second leg	Zorya Luhansk (Ukraine)	2–2 (3–5 agg.)	(Spain) Espanyol	Zaporizhia, Ukraine
20:00 CEST (UTC+2)	Lyednyev 54'; Rusyn 78'	Report	Ferreyra 34'; Vargas 62'	Stadium: Slavutych-Arena; Attendance: 10,181; Referee: Radu Petrescu (Romania)

==== Group stage ====
Pos	Team	Pld	W	D	L	GF	GA	GD	Pts	Qualification
1	(Spain) Espanyol	6	3	2	1	12	4	+8	11	Advance to knockout phase
2	(Bulgaria) Ludogorets Razgrad	6	2	2	2	10	10	0	8	Advance to knockout phase
3	(Hungary) Ferencváros	6	1	4	1	5	7	−2	7	
4	(Russia) CSKA Moscow	6	1	2	3	3	9	−6	5	

Source: UEFA
Rules for classification: Group stage tiebreakers

19 September 2019 1	Espanyol (Spain)	1–1	(Hungary) Ferencváros	Cornellà de Llobregat, Spain
21:00 CEST (UTC+2)	Vargas 60'	Report	J. López 10' (o.g.); Ihnatenko (yellow card) 41'	Stadium: RCDE Stadium; Attendance: 18,125; Referee: Nikola Dabanović (Montenegro)

3 October 2019 2	CSKA Moscow (Russia)	0–2	(Spain) Espanyol	Moscow, Russia
18:55 CEST (UTC+2)	Fernandes (yellow card) 37'; Oblyakov (yellow card) 87'; Bijol (yellow card) 90+2'	Report	Piatti (yellow card) 31'; Wu Lei 64', (yellow card) 70'; Granero (yellow card) 66'; Campuzano 90+5'	Stadium: VEB Arena; Attendance: 22,288; Referee: Ali Palabıyık (Turkey)

24 October 2019 3	Ludogorets Razgrad (Bulgaria)	0–1	(Spain) Espanyol	Razgrad, Bulgaria
18:55 CEST (UTC+2)	Cicinho (yellow card) 15'; Moți (yellow card) 25'; Anicet (yellow card) 60'	Report	Campuzano 13'; J. López (yellow card) 85' (yellow-red card) 88'; Iturraspe (yellow card) 87'; L. López (yellow card) 90+2'	Stadium: Ludogorets Arena; Attendance: 10,334; Referee: Aliyar Aghayev (Azerbaijan)

7 November 2019 4	Espanyol (Spain)	6–0	(Bulgaria) Ludogorets Razgrad	Cornellà de Llobregat, Spain
21:00 CET (UTC+1)	Melendo 4'; L. López 19'; Vargas 36' (pen.); Campuzano 52'; Pedrosa 73'; Ferreyra 76'	Report	Forster (red card) 12'; Góralski (yellow card) 25' (yellow-red card) 35'; Badji (yellow card) 90'; Lukoki (yellow card) 90+1'	Stadium: RCDE Stadium; Attendance: 13,963; Referee: François Letexier (France)

28 November 2019 5	Ferencváros (Hungary)	2–2	(Spain) Espanyol	Budapest, Hungary
18:55 CET (UTC+1)	Ćivić (yellow card) 12' (yellow-red card) 90+4'; Sigér 23'; Boli (yellow card) 25'; Frimpong (yellow card) 35'; Škvarka 90+1' (pen.)	Report	Melendo 31'; L. López (yellow card) 43'; Calero (yellow card) 76'; Vilà (yellow card) 76'; Ezzarfani (yellow card) 78'; Iturraspe (yellow card) 90'; Darder 90+6'	Stadium: Groupama Arena; Attendance: 19,111; Referee: Tiago Martins (Portugal)

12 December 2019 6	Espanyol (Spain)	0–1	(Russia) CSKA Moscow	Cornellà de Llobregat, Spain
21:00 CET (UTC+1)		Report	Oblyakov (yellow card) 71'; Magnússon (yellow card) 72'; Karpov (yellow card) 76'; Diveyev (yellow card) 77'; Vlašić 84'	Stadium: RCDE Stadium; Attendance: 10,615; Referee: Kevin Blom (Netherlands)

==== Knockout phase ====
===== Round of 32 =====
20 February 2020 First leg	Wolverhampton Wanderers (England)	4–0	(Spain) Espanyol	Wolverhampton, England
21:00 CET (UTC+1)	Jota 15', 67', 81'; Moutinho (yellow card) 43'; Neves 52'	Report	Iturraspe (yellow card) 43'; Gómez (yellow card) 67'; Sánchez (yellow card) 78'	Stadium: Molineux Stadium; Attendance: 30,435; Referee: Tobias Stieler (Germany)

27 February 2020 Second leg	Espanyol (Spain)	3–2 (3–6 agg.)	(England) Wolverhampton Wanderers	Cornellà de Llobregat, Spain
18:55 CET (UTC+1)	Calleri 16', 57' (pen.), 90+1', (yellow card) 67'; Sánchez (yellow card) 40'; Vargas (yellow card) 67'	Report	Traoré (yellow card) 6', (goal) 22'; Kilman (yellow card) 57'; Gibbs-White (yellow card) 63'; Doherty 80'	Stadium: RCDE Stadium; Attendance: 14,525; Referee: Marco Guida (Italy)

== Statistics ==
=== Appearances and goals ===
Last updated on the end of the season.

No.	Pos	Nat	Player	Total		La Liga		Copa del Rey		Europa League	
No.	Pos	Nat	Player	Apps	Goals	Apps	Goals	Apps	Goals	Apps	Goals
Goalkeepers
1	GK	(Spain) ESP	Andrés Prieto	6	0	0	0	3	0	3	0
13	GK	(Spain) ESP	Diego López	47	0	36	0	0	0	11	0
25	GK	(Spain) ESP	Oier	2	0	2	0	0	0	0	0
Defenders
2	DF	(Spain) ESP	Pipa	13	0	5+2	0	2	0	3+1	0
3	DF	(Spain) ESP	Adrià Pedrosa	31	3	11+9	1	3	0	6+2	2
5	DF	(Brazil) BRA	Naldo	26	0	15+3	0	1	0	7	0
16	DF	(Spain) ESP	Javi López	28	1	16+1	0	3	0	8	1
17	DF	(Spain) ESP	Dídac Vilà	41	1	28+2	0	0	0	10+1	1
18	DF	(Uruguay) URU	Leandro Cabrera	17	0	17	0	0	0	0	0
20	DF	(Colombia) COL	Bernardo Espinosa	32	3	26	3	1	0	5	0
24	DF	(Spain) ESP	Fernando Calero	24	0	12+3	0	2	0	7	0
34	DF	(Spain) ESP	Víctor Gómez	21	0	14+4	0	0+1	0	2	0
37	DF	(Spain) ESP	Ricard Pujol	1	0	0	0	0+1	0	0	0
Midfielders
4	MF	(Spain) ESP	Víctor Sánchez	34	0	20+5	0	0+1	0	6+2	0
8	MF	(Spain) ESP	Ander Iturraspe	18	0	3+5	0	3	0	6+1	0
10	MF	(Spain) ESP	Sergi Darder	44	3	29+7	2	0	0	5+3	1
14	MF	(Spain) ESP	Óscar Melendo	35	2	12+12	0	1	0	10	2
15	MF	(Spain) ESP	David López	36	4	29+3	4	0+1	0	2+1	0
21	MF	(Spain) ESP	Marc Roca	44	2	35	2	1	0	5+3	0
26	MF	(Spain) ESP	Pol Lozano	14	0	2+3	0	2	0	4+3	0
29	MF	(Morocco) MAR	Mohamed Ezzarfani	2	0	0	0	0+1	0	0+1	0
33	MF	(Spain) ESP	Nico Melamed	7	0	2+4	0	0	0	0+1	0
36	MF	(Cameroon) CMR	Kévin Soni	1	0	0+1	0	0	0	0	0
Forwards
7	FW	(China) CHN	Wu Lei	49	8	21+12	4	3	2	6+7	2
9	FW	(Argentina) ARG	Facundo Ferreyra	27	8	5+11	1	2	0	7+2	7
11	FW	(Spain) ESP	Raúl de Tomás	15	5	11+3	4	0+1	1	0	0
12	FW	(Argentina) ARG	Jonathan Calleri	34	5	20+7	1	1	1	2+4	3
22	FW	(Argentina) ARG	Matías Vargas	33	5	10+11	0	2	0	7+3	5
23	FW	(Spain) ESP	Adri Embarba	18	2	17+1	2	0	0	0	0
31	FW	(Spain) ESP	Víctor Campuzano	29	5	9+11	0	0+1	0	5+3	5
Players who have made an appearance or had a squad number this season but have left the club
6	DF	(Spain) ESP	Lluís López	15	1	3+1	0	2	0	9	1
7	FW	(Spain) ESP	Borja Iglesias	3	3	0	0	0	0	3	3
11	FW	(Spain) ESP	Javi Puado	3	0	0	0	0	0	1+2	0
18	MF	(Spain) ESP	Álex Lopez	0	0	0	0	0	0	0	0
19	FW	(Argentina) ARG	Pablo Piatti	7	0	0+3	0	1+1	0	1+1	0
23	MF	(Spain) ESP	Esteban Granero	21	1	5+6	1	0	0	9+1	0
	DF	(France) FRA	Sébastien Corchia	7	0	3	0	0	0	4	0

=== Goalscorers ===
Last updated on 2 July 2020.

No.	Pos.	Nat.	Name	La Liga	Europa League	Copa del Rey	Total
9	FW	(Argentina)	Facundo Ferreyra	1	7	0	8
7	FW	(China)	Wu Lei	4	2	2	8
12	FW	(Argentina)	Jonathan Calleri	1	3	1	5
31	FW	(Spain)	Víctor Campuzano	0	5	0	5
11	FW	(Spain)	Raúl de Tomás	4	0	1	5
22	FW	(Argentina)	Matías Vargas	0	5	0	5
15	MF	(Spain)	David López	4	0	0	4
10	MF	(Spain)	Sergi Darder	2	1	0	3
20	DF	(Colombia)	Bernardo Espinosa	3	0	0	3
~~7~~	FW	(Spain)	Borja Iglesias	0	3	0	3
3	DF	(Spain)	Adrià Pedrosa	1	2	0	3
23	FW	(Spain)	Adri Embarba	2	0	0	2
14	MF	(Spain)	Óscar Melendo	0	2	0	2
21	MF	(Spain)	Marc Roca	2	0	0	2
~~23~~	MF	(Spain)	Esteban Granero	1	0	0	1
16	DF	(Spain)	Javi López	0	1	0	1
6	DF	(Spain)	Lluís López	0	1	0	1
17	DF	(Spain)	Dídac Vilà	0	1	0	1
Own goals				1	0	0	1
TOTAL				27	33	4	64
