= Lluís Recasens =

Spanish footballer

Personal information
- Full name: Lluís Recasens Vives
- Date of birth: 19 February 2002 (age 24)
- Place of birth: Tarragona, Spain
- Height: 1.83 m (6 ft 0 in)
- Position: Centre-back

Team information
- Current team: Reus FCR
- Number: 5

Youth career
- Gimnàstic
- Reus
- 2017–2020: Espanyol

Senior career*
Years	Team	Apps	(Gls)
2020–2024	Espanyol B	63	(0)
2021	Espanyol	1	(0)
2024	Badalona Futur	12	(1)
2024–2025	Deportivo Aragón	19	(2)
2025–	Reus FCR	32	(1)

International career^{‡}
2020	Spain U18	4	(1)
- * Club domestic league appearances and goals as of 7 May 2026 ‡ National team caps and goals as of 26 February 2020

Lluís Recasens Vives (born 19 February 2002) is a Spanish professional footballer who plays as a centre-back for Segunda Federación club Reus FC Reddis.

== Club career ==
Born in Tarragona, Catalonia, Recasens played for local sides Gimnàstic de Tarragona and CF Reus Deportiu before joining RCD Espanyol in 2017. He made his senior debut with the latter's reserves on 18 October 2020, starting in a 2–1 Segunda División B home win against AE Prat.

Recasens subsequently became a regular starter for the B-side, partnering Ricard Pujol, and ended the campaign with 22 appearances. He made his first team – and La Liga – debut on 12 September 2021, coming on as a half-time substitute for Fernando Calero in a 1–2 home loss to Atlético Madrid.
