= Reus FC Reddis =

Reus FCR
- Full name: Reus Futbol Club Reddis
- Founded: 1922; 104 years ago as FC Catalunya; 2022; 4 years ago as Reus FC Reddis
- Ground: Estadi Municipal de Reus, Reus, Catalonia, Spain
- Capacity: 4,700
- President: Xavier Roig
- Head coach: Marc Carrasco
- League: Segunda Federación – Group 2
- 2025–26: Segunda Federación – Group 3, 4th of 18
- Website: https://www.reusfcreddis.com/
Home colours	Away colours	Third colours

Reus Futbol Club Reddis known simply as Reus FCR, formerly known as Club de Fútbol Reddis, is a Spanish football team based in Reus, in Catalonia. Founded in 1922, they play in the Segunda Federación – Group 2, holding home matches at the Estadi Municipal de Reus.

== History ==
The team was founded in 1922 under the name FC Catalunya, later in the 1930s it would change its name to Catalunya Nova. At the end of the Spanish Civil War, the club underwent a name change again and was renamed CD Nacional, finally in 1941 it adopted the name Club de Fútbol Reddis, with which it is known.

During most of its history, CF Reddis was the second most important club in the city of Reus, due to the prominence of CF Reus Deportiu. Since while Reus Deportiu played national competitions such as Segunda División, Segunda B and Tercera División, Reddis remained in the regional categories of Catalan football, between 2010 and 2015 Reddis functioned as a reserve team for Reus Deportiu.

In 2018 a financial crisis began for Reus Deportiu, finally the team was liquidated in October 2020 after not being able to settle its debts, so CF Reddis became the main team in the city.

During 2021, conversations began between CF Reddis and the youth football branch of CF Reus Deportiu for the creation of a unique club project. Finally, in the summer of 2022, the Reddis members' assembly approved the proposal and the team was renamed Reus FC Reddis. In addition, the team began to use the colors red and black as the main colors, leaving the traditional white and blue as secondary colors. The team also moved to the Estadi Municipal de Reus.

In May 2023, Reus FCR were promoted to the Tercera Federación after beating Cambrils UCF and securing the championship of the Primera Catalana – Group 3, in this way the team was able to access the national categories of Spanish football for the first time in their history and return the city of Reus to national football leagues after an absence of four years.

In April 2025 Reus FCR was promoted to Segunda Federación.

=== Club background ===
- Fútbol Club Catalunya (1922–1930s)
- Fútbol Club Catalunya Nova (1930s–1939)
- Club Deportivo Nacional (1939–1941)
- Club de Fútbol Reddis (1941–2022)
- Reus Futbol Club Reddis (2022–)

== Season to season ==
Season	Tier	Division	Place	Copa del Rey
1939–40	6	2ª Reg.	2nd	
1940–41	6	2ª Reg.	1st	
1941–42	5	2ª Reg.	4th	
1942–43	5	2ª Reg.	4th	
1943–44	6	2ª Reg.	1st	
1944–45	6	2ª Reg. P.	2nd	
1945–46	5	1ª Reg. B	2nd	
1946–47	5	1ª Reg. B	8th	
1947–48	5	1ª Reg. B	3rd	
1948–49	5	1ª Reg. B	12th	
1949–50	5	1ª Reg. B		
1950–51	5	1ª Reg. B	12th	
1951–52	5	2ª Reg.	10th	
1952–53	5	2ª Reg.	12th	
1953–54	5	2ª Reg.	10th	
1954–55	5	2ª Reg.	7th	
1955–56	5	2ª Reg.	2nd	
1956–57	4	1ª Reg.	2nd	
1957–58	4	1ª Reg.	21st	
1958–59	5	2ª Reg.	3rd	

Season	Tier	Division	Place	Copa del Rey
1959–60	4	1ª Reg.	19th	
1960–61	4	1ª Reg.	21st	
1961–62	4	1ª Reg.	16th	
1962–63	5	2ª Reg.		
1963–64	5	2ª Reg.	9th	
1964–65	5	2ª Reg.	4th	
1965–66	5	2ª Reg.	5th	
1966–67	5	2ª Reg.	2nd	
1967–68	4	1ª Reg.	17th	
1968–69	5	1ª Reg.	17th	
1969–70	5	1ª Reg.	6th	
1970–71	5	1ª Reg.	15th	
1971–72	5	1ª Reg.	18th	
1972–73	5	1ª Reg.	20th	
1973–74	6	2ª Reg.	17th	
1974–75	7	3ª Reg.	1st	
1975–76	6	2ª Reg.	6th	
1976–77	6	2ª Reg.	4th	
1977–78	7	2ª Reg.	6th	
1978–79	7	2ª Reg.	11th	

Season	Tier	Division	Place	Copa del Rey
1979–80	7	2ª Reg.	10th	
1980–81	7	2ª Reg.	17th	
1981–82	7	2ª Reg.	13th	
1982–83	7	2ª Reg.	14th	
1983–84	7	2ª Reg.	2nd	
1984–85	6	1ª Reg.	12th	
1985–86	6	1ª Reg.	3rd	
1986–87	6	1ª Reg.	4th	
1987–88	6	1ª Reg.	3rd	
1988–89	6	1ª Reg.	8th	
1989–90	6	1ª Reg.	13th	
1990–91	6	1ª Reg.	18th	
1991–92	8	2ª Terr.	1st	
1992–93	7	1ª Terr.	13th	
1993–94	7	1ª Terr.	18th	
1994–95	8	2ª Terr.	15th	
1995–96	8	2ª Terr.	7th	
1996–97	8	2ª Terr.	8th	
1997–98	8	2ª Terr.	15th	
1998–99	8	2ª Terr.	3rd	

Season	Tier	Division	Place	Copa del Rey
1999–2000	8	2ª Terr.	1st	
2000–01	7	1ª Terr.	14th	
2001–02	7	1ª Terr.	16th	
2002–03	7	1ª Terr.	17th	
2003–04	8	2ª Terr.	1st	
2004–05	8	2ª Terr.	1st	
2005–06	7	1ª Terr.	12th	
2006–07	7	1ª Terr.	17th	
2007–08	8	2ª Terr.	2nd	
2008–09	7	1ª Terr.	6th	
2009–10	7	1ª Terr.	1st	
2010–11	6	Pref. Terr.	3rd	N/A (Note: Reserve team of Reus.)
2011–12	5	1ª Cat.	5th	N/A
2012–13	5	1ª Cat.	14th	N/A
2013–14	6	2ª Cat.	1st	N/A
2014–15	5	1ª Cat.	6th	N/A
2015–16	5	1ª Cat.	15th	
2016–17	6	2ª Cat.	7th	
2017–18	6	2ª Cat.	10th	
2018–19	6	2ª Cat.	17th	

Season	Tier	Division	Place	Copa del Rey
2019–20	7	3ª Cat.	2nd	
2020–21	6	2ª Cat.	6th	
2021–22	7	2ª Cat.	1st	
2022–23	6	1ª Cat.	1st	
2023–24	5	3ª Fed.	8th	
2024–25	5	3ª Fed.	1st	
2025–26	4	2ª Fed.	4th	Second round
2026–27	4	2ª Fed.		TBD

- 2 seasons in Segunda Federación
- 2 seasons in Tercera Federación

== Current squad ==
As of 7 February 2026

Note: Flags indicate national team as defined under FIFA eligibility rules; some limited exceptions apply. Players may hold more than one non-FIFA nationality.

No.	Pos.	Nation	Player
2	DF	ESP	Alberto Benito
3	DF	ESP	Pol Fernández
4	DF	ESP	Xavi Molina
5	DF	ESP	Lluís Recasens
6	MF	ESP	Marc Grau
7	MF	ESP	Xavi Jaime
8	MF	ESP	Ramón Folch
9	FW	ESP	Josep Ramón
10	MF	POR	Ricardo Vaz
11	FW	ESP	Fran Carbià
13	GK	ESP	Dani Parra

No.	Pos.	Nation	Player
14	MF	ITA	Sandro Toscano
16	MF	ESP	Lluis Estebe
17	FW	ESP	Aitor Serrano
18	FW	ESP	Kenneth Soler
19	DF	ESP	Andy Alarcón
20	FW	ESP	Óscar Jiménez
21	DF	ESP	Raúl Melo
22	MF	ESP	Miquel Ustrell
23	DF	ESP	Sergi Casals
24	DF	ESP	Pol Fernández Serra
25	GK	ESP	Álvaro Pacheco
