= Ricardo Vaz =

Portuguese footballer

Personal information
- Full name: Ricardo Álvares Guedes Vaz
- Date of birth: 26 November 1994 (age 31)
- Place of birth: Alcabideche, Portugal
- Height: 1.71 m (5 ft 7 in)
- Position: Winger

Team information
- Current team: Reus FCR
- Number: 10

Youth career
- 2003–2013: Estoril

Senior career*
Years	Team	Apps	(Gls)
2013–2015	Estoril	5	(1)
2015–2019	Reus	77	(5)
2019–2021	OFI	35	(5)
2021–2022	Covilhã	12	(0)
2022	A.E. Kifisia	20	(2)
2023	GKS Jastrzębie	27	(2)
2024–	Reus FCR	78	(25)
- * Club domestic league appearances and goals as of 7 May 2026

Ricardo Álvares Guedes Vaz (born 26 November 1994) is a Portuguese professional footballer who plays as a right winger for Segunda Federación club Reus FC Reddis.

== Club career ==
=== Estoril ===
Born in Alcabideche, Cascais, Vaz graduated from G.D. Estoril Praia's youth setup. He played his first match as a professional on 4 January 2014, coming on as a 63rd-minute substitute in a 5–1 away win against Leixões S.C. in the fifth round of the Taça de Portugal. In his maiden Primeira Liga appearance, on 1 March, he only needed six minutes on the pitch to score his first goal in the competition, converting a penalty kick in the late stages of an eventual 4–0 home defeat of S.C. Olhanense.

=== Reus ===
On 27 January 2015, Vaz terminated his contract with Estoril and moved to Spain after agreeing to a five-year deal with Segunda División B side CF Reus Deportiu. He made 27 appearances in his first full season – playoffs included – scoring three times to help the club reach Segunda División for the first time in its 117-year history.

Vaz scored his first goal in the Spanish second tier on 10 September 2016, equalising the 1–1 home draw with CD Numancia.

=== OFI ===
On 30 January 2019, OFI Crete F.C. announced the signing of Vaz on a two-and-a-half-year contract for an undisclosed fee. He scored his first Super League Greece goal on 31 March, but in a 3–1 away loss against Aris Thessaloniki FC. He repeated the feat a week later, at home to relegation rivals PAS Giannina FC (1–0).

On 12 September 2020, in the last minutes of a league fixture against Panetolikos FC, Vaz suffered the second anterior cruciate ligament injury of his career.

=== Later career ===
Vaz split the 2021–22 campaign between S.C. Covilhã (Liga Portugal 2) and A.E. Kifisia FC (Super League Greece 2). On 16 February 2023, he joined Polish II liga team GKS Jastrzębie on a ten-month deal.

On 12 January 2024, Vaz returned to Reus, with the club now renamed Reus FC Reddis and competing in the amateur Tercera Federación.
