= Oier Olazábal =

Spanish footballer

Oier
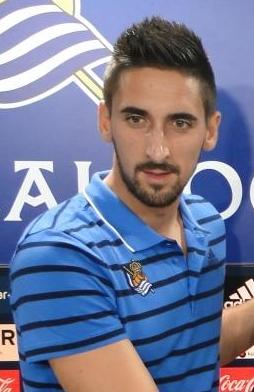
- Oier with Real Sociedad in 2015

Personal information
- Full name: Oier Olazábal Paredes
- Date of birth: 14 September 1989 (age 37)
- Place of birth: Irun, Spain
- Height: 1.90 m (6 ft 3 in)
- Position: Goalkeeper

Youth career
- 2005–2007: Real Unión

Senior career*
Years	Team	Apps	(Gls)
2007–2013	Barcelona B	115	(0)
2008–2014	Barcelona	1	(0)
2014–2017	Granada	14	(0)
2015–2016	→ Real Sociedad (loan)	3	(0)
2017	→ Levante (loan)	5	(0)
2017–2020	Levante	47	(0)
2020–2022	Espanyol	6	(0)
2022–2023	Pafos	1	(0)
2023–2025	Andorra	12	(0)
Total		204	(0)

International career
2008	Spain U19	1	(0)
2016	Basque Country	1	(0)
- * Club domestic league appearances and goals

Oier Olazábal Paredes (born 14 September 1989), known simply as Oier, is a Spanish former professional footballer who played as a goalkeeper.

== Club career ==
=== Barcelona ===
Born in Irun, Gipuzkoa, Basque Country, Oier arrived in FC Barcelona's youth academy at the age of 18, from local Real Unión. He spent his first years with the reserves as backup to another youth product, Rubén.

Oier made his debut for the first team on 2 January 2008, in the 2–2 home draw against CD Alcoyano in the round of 32 of the Copa del Rey. More than one year after, on 17 May, he appeared for the first time in La Liga as Barça were already champions, in a 2–1 away loss to RCD Mallorca.

For the 2009–10 campaign, after Albert Jorquera left for neighbours Girona FC, Oier was promoted to third choice. He still continued to appear regularly for the B's, however.

=== Granada ===
On 11 July 2014, Oier signed a three-year deal with Granada CF for an undisclosed fee. On 25 August of the following year, he was loaned to fellow top-division side Real Sociedad in a season-long deal.

=== Levante ===
On 29 January 2017, Oier was loaned to Levante UD for the rest of the campaign with the option to buy in event of promotion; he replaced Álex Remiro, whose own temporary switch from Athletic Bilbao had been curtailed. Manager Juan Ramón López Muñiz began playing him in place of Raúl Fernández in the final matches, including in the goalless draw at CD Tenerife on 20 May that saw the Granotas crowned Segunda División champions.

Oier took the starting place from Fernández in the top flight, and signed a new deal in June 2018 to last until 2021, with a further year as an option.

=== Espanyol ===
Having only been used in cup games due to Paco López' preference for Aitor Fernández, Oier left for RCD Espanyol on 31 January 2020 for a €1.5 million fee, signing until June 2022 with the option of another season after that. Due to Diego López' suspension, he debuted on 13 June as the 70th goalkeeper in the club's history in a 2–0 home win over Deportivo Alavés.

=== Pafos ===
On 17 August 2022, Oier moved abroad for the first time in his career and signed for Pafos FC in the Cypriot First Division. He featured in only two games during his spell.

=== Andorra ===
Oier returned to Spain and its second tier on 29 August 2023, after agreeing to a two-year contract at FC Andorra.

== International career ==
On 30 December 2016, Oier made his one appearance for the unofficial Basque Country team, playing the second half of a 3–1 win over Tunisia at the San Mamés Stadium.

== Career statistics ==
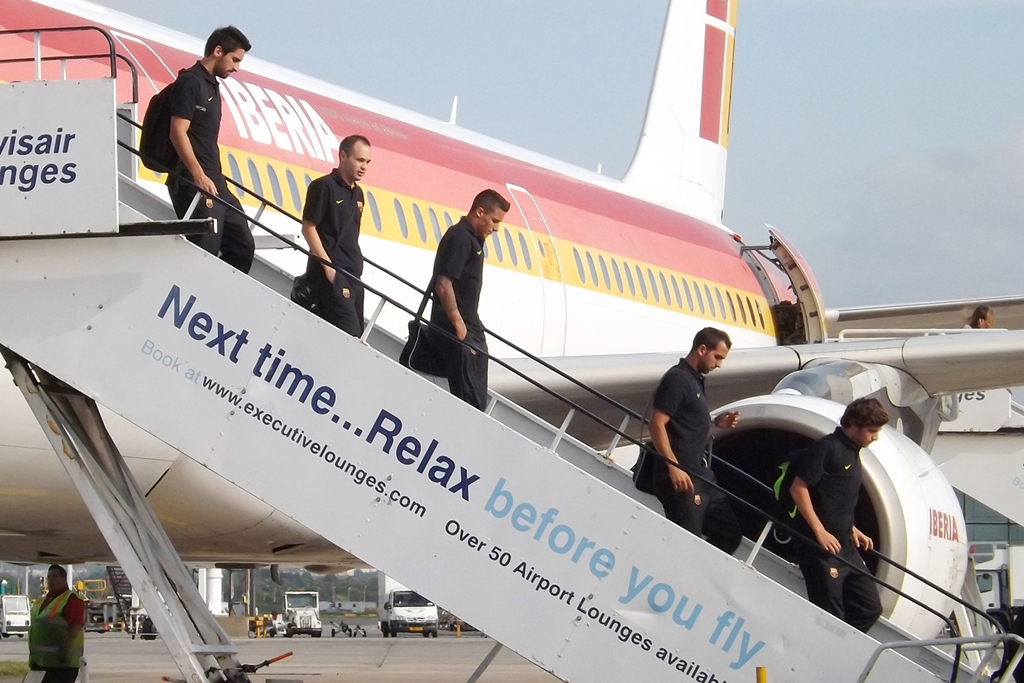
Oier (first from the left) arriving in Glasgow with Barcelona

Appearances and goals by club, season and competition
Club	Season	League			Cup		Continental		Other		Total	
Club	Season	Division	Apps	Goals	Apps	Goals	Apps	Goals	Apps	Goals	Apps	Goals
Barcelona B	2007–08	Tercera División	31	0	—		—		4 (Note: Appearances in Tercera División promotion play-offs)	0	35	0
Barcelona B	2008–09	Segunda División B	9	0	—		—		—		9	0
Barcelona B	2009–10	Segunda División B	18	0	—		—		3 (Note: Appearances in Segunda División B promotion play-offs)	0	21	0
Barcelona B	2010–11	Segunda División	15	0	—		—		—		15	0
Barcelona B	2011–12	Segunda División	23	0	—		—		—		23	0
Barcelona B	2012–13	Segunda División	19	0	—		—		—		19	0
Barcelona B	Total		115	0	—		—		7	0	122	0
Barcelona	2007–08	La Liga	0	0	1	0	0	0	—		1	0
Barcelona	2008–09	La Liga	1	0	0	0	0	0	—		1	0
Barcelona	2010–11	La Liga	0	0	0	0	0	0	0	0	0	0
Barcelona	2011–12	La Liga	0	0	0	0	0	0	0	0	0	0
Barcelona	2012–13	La Liga	0	0	0	0	0	0	—		0	0
Barcelona	2013–14	La Liga	0	0	0	0	0	0	—		0	0
Barcelona	Total		1	0	1	0	0	0	0	0	2	0
Granada	2014–15	La Liga	14	0	2	0	—		—		16	0
Granada	2015–16	La Liga	0	0	0	0	—		—		0	0
Granada	2016–17	La Liga	0	0	1	0	—		—		1	0
Granada	Total		14	0	3	0	—		—		17	0
Real Sociedad (loan)	2015–16	La Liga	3	0	2	0	—		—		5	0
Levante (loan)	2016–17	Segunda División	5	0	0	0	—		—		5	0
Levante	2017–18	La Liga	26	0	1	0	—		—		27	0
Levante	2018–19	La Liga	21	0	0	0	—		—		21	0
Levante	2019–20	La Liga	0	0	2	0	—		—		2	0
Levante	Levante total		52	0	3	0	—		—		55	0
Espanyol	2019–20	La Liga	2	0	—		—		—		2	0
Espanyol	2020–21	Segunda División	2	0	2	0	—		—		4	0
Espanyol	2021–22	La Liga	2	0	0	0	—		—		2	0
Espanyol	Total		6	0	2	0	—		—		8	0
Pafos	2022–23	Cypriot First Division	1	0	1	0	—		—		2	0
Andorra	2023–24	Segunda División	0	0	0	0	—		—		0	0
Andorra	2024–25	Primera Federación	12	0	1	0	—		0	0	13	0
Andorra	Total		12	0	1	0	—		0	0	13	0
Career total			204	0	13	0	0	0	7	0	224	0

== Honours ==
Barcelona

- La Liga: 2008–09
- Supercopa de España: 2010
- UEFA Champions League: 2010–11
- UEFA Super Cup: 2011
- FIFA Club World Cup: 2011

Levante

- Segunda División: 2016–17

Espanyol

- Segunda División: 2020–21
