= Víctor Gómez (footballer) =

Spanish footballer

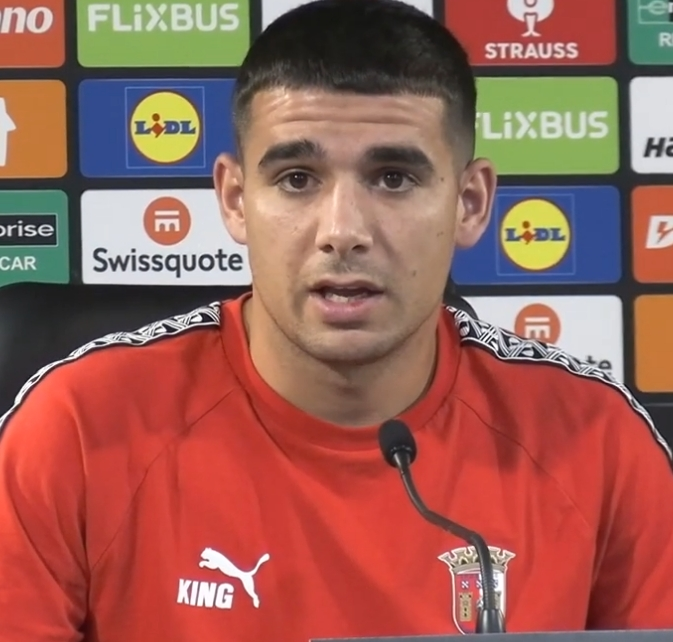

Personal information
- Full name: Víctor Gómez Perea
- Date of birth: 1 April 2000 (age 26)
- Place of birth: Olesa de Montserrat, Spain
- Height: 1.69 m (5 ft 7 in)
- Position: Right-back

Team information
- Current team: Braga
- Number: 2

Youth career
- EFO 87
- Espanyol
- 2010–2014: Barcelona
- 2014–2015: Damm
- 2015–2017: Espanyol

Senior career*
| Years | Team | Apps | (Gls) |
| 2017–2020 | Espanyol B | 47 | (2) |
| 2019–2023 | Espanyol | 19 | (0) |
| 2020–2021 | → Mirandés (loan) | 38 | (1) |
| 2021–2022 | → Málaga (loan) | 35 | (0) |
| 2022–2023 | → Braga (loan) | 26 | (0) |
| 2023– | Braga | 97 | (1) |

International career^{‡}
| 2017 | Spain U17 | 9 | (1) |
| 2018 | Spain U18 | 2 | (0) |
| 2018–2019 | Spain U19 | 14 | (0) |
| 2021–2023 | Spain U21 | 11 | (1) |
Medal record
Representing Spain
UEFA European Under-21 Championship
| Runner-up | 2023 Georgia–Romania |
UEFA European Under-19 Championship
| Winner | 2019 Armenia |
FIFA U-17 World Cup
| Runner-up | 2017 India |
UEFA European Under-17 Championship
| Winner | 2017 Croatia |
- * Club domestic league appearances and goals as of 25 October 2026 ‡ National team caps and goals as of 8 July 2023

Víctor Gómez Perea (born 1 April 2000) is a Spanish professional footballer who plays as a right-back for Primeira Liga club Braga.

== Club career ==
Born in Olesa de Montserrat, Barcelona, Catalonia, Gómez started his career at hometown side EFO 87, and subsequently represented Espanyol, Barcelona and Damm, before returning to the Pericos in 2015. He made his senior debut with the reserves on 25 March 2017 at the age of just 16, coming on as a second-half substitute for Carles Soria in a 0–2 Segunda División B home loss against Villarreal B.

Gómez was regularly used during the 2017–18 campaign, as his side achieved promotion from Tercera División, and scored his first senior goal on 13 May 2018 by netting the game's only in a home success over Pobla de Mafumet. On 3 August of that year, he extended his contract until 2025.

Gómez made his first team – and La Liga – debut on 20 October 2019, starting in a 0–1 home loss against Villarreal. He finished the campaign with 21 appearances overall, as his side suffered relegation.

On 10 September 2020, Gómez was loaned to Mirandés of the Segunda División for the 2020–21 season. He scored his first professional goal on 10 October, concluding a 2–0 away defeat of Sabadell. The following 20 August, he moved to Málaga in the same division on a one-year loan deal, reuniting with former Mirandés manager José Alberto.

Gómez moved to Primeira Liga side Braga also in a temporary deal on 29 June 2022, with the option of a €2 million transfer and a five-year contract. He made his debut on 8 August as the season opened with a 3–3 home draw against Sporting CP, in which he suffered a right thigh injury and was taken off before half time.

== Career statistics ==
As of match played 29 October 2026

Appearances and goals by club, season and competition
| Club | Season | League | | | National cup (Note: Includes Copa del Rey, Taça de Portugal) | | League cup (Note: Includes Taça da Liga) | | Europe | | Total | |
| Club | Season | Division | Apps | Goals | Apps | Goals | Apps | Goals | Apps | Goals | Apps | Goals |
|---|---|---|---|---|---|---|---|---|---|---|---|---|
| Espanyol B | 2016–17 | Segunda División B | 4 | 0 | — | | — | | — | | 4 | 0 |
| Espanyol B | 2017–18 | Segunda División B | 2 | 0 | — | | — | | — | | 2 | 0 |
| Espanyol B | 2018–19 | Segunda División B | 34 | 1 | — | | — | | — | | 34 | 1 |
| Espanyol B | 2019–20 | Segunda División B | 7 | 1 | — | | — | | — | | 7 | 1 |
| Espanyol B | Total | | 47 | 2 | — | | — | | — | | 47 | 2 |
| Espanyol | 2019–20 | La Liga | 18 | 0 | 1 | 0 | — | | 2 (Note: Appearances in UEFA Europa League) | 0 | 21 | 0 |
| Espanyol | 2021–22 | La Liga | 1 | 0 | 0 | 0 | — | | — | | 1 | 0 |
| Espanyol | Total | | 19 | 0 | 1 | 0 | — | | 2 | 0 | 22 | 0 |
| Mirandés (loan) | 2020–21 | Segunda División | 38 | 1 | 0 | 0 | — | | — | | 38 | 1 |
| Málaga (loan) | 2021–22 | Segunda División | 35 | 0 | 1 | 0 | — | | — | | 36 | 0 |
| Braga (loan) | 2022–23 | Primeira Liga | 26 | 0 | 5 | 0 | 4 | 0 | 3 (Note: Two appearances in UEFA Europa League, one appearance in UEFA Conference League) | 0 | 38 | 0 |
| Braga | 2023–24 | Primeira Liga | 30 | 0 | 2 | 0 | 3 | 0 | 10 (Note: Eight appearances in UEFA Champions League, two appearances in UEFA Europa League) | 0 | 45 | 0 |
| Braga | 2024–25 | Primeira Liga | 27 | 0 | 2 | 0 | 2 | 0 | 10 | 0 | 41 | 0 |
| Braga | 2025–26 | Primeira Liga | 31 | 1 | 4 | 1 | 3 | 0 | 17 | 1 | 55 | 2 |
| Braga | 2026–27 | Primeira Liga | 9 | 0 | 1 | 0 | 0 | 0 | 8 (Note: Appearances in UEFA Conference League) | 0 | 18 | 0 |
| Braga | Total | | 97 | 1 | 9 | 1 | 8 | 0 | 45 | 1 | 159 | 3 |
| Career total | | | 272 | 4 | 16 | 1 | 12 | 0 | 50 | 1 | 339 | 6 |

== Honours ==
Braga

- Taça da Liga: 2023–24

Spain U17

- UEFA European Under-17 Championship: 2017
- FIFA Under-17 World Cup runner-up: 2017

Spain U18

- Mediterranean Games Gold Medal: 2018

Spain U19

- UEFA European Under-19 Championship: 2019

Spain U21

- UEFA European Under-21 Championship runner-up: 2023

Individual

- UEFA European Under-19 Championship Team of the Tournament: 2019
- UEFA Europa League Team of the Season: 2025–26
