= Adrià Pedrosa =

Spanish footballer

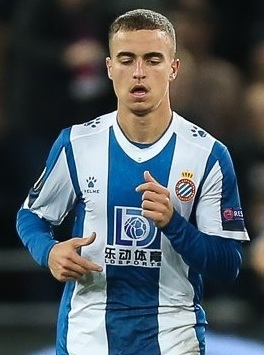
- Pedrosa with Espanyol in 2019

Personal information
- Full name: Adrià Giner Pedrosa
- Date of birth: 13 May 1998 (age 28)
- Place of birth: Barcelona, Spain
- Height: 1.76 m (5 ft 9 in)
- Position: Left-back

Team information
- Current team: Rayo Vallecano (on loan from Sevilla)

Youth career
- 2004–2009: Castelldefels
- 2009–2014: Gavà
- 2014–2017: Espanyol

Senior career*
Years	Team	Apps	(Gls)
2017–2018	Espanyol B	46	(7)
2018–2023	Espanyol	102	(4)
2023–	Sevilla	63	(2)
2025–2026	→ Elche (loan)	26	(1)
2026–	→ Rayo Vallecano (loan)	6	(0)

International career
2019–2021	Spain U21	9	(2)
- * Club domestic league appearances and goals as of 24 October 2026

Adrià Giner Pedrosa (Catalan pronunciation: [əðɾiˈa pəˈðɾozə]; born 13 May 1998) is a Spanish professional footballer who plays as a left-back for La Liga club Rayo Vallecano, on loan from Sevilla.

== Club career ==
=== Espanyol ===
Born in Barcelona, Catalonia, Pedrosa joined RCD Espanyol's youth setup in 2014, from CF Gavà's youth setup EF Gavà. He made his senior debut with the reserves on 16 April 2017, starting in a 1–1 Segunda División B away draw against RCD Mallorca B.

Pedrosa was definitely promoted to the B-team in July 2017, after the club's relegation, and scored his first senior goal on 10 September of that year, netting his side's second in a 3–2 home success over UE Sant Andreu. He made his first-team debut on 1 November 2018, starting in a 1–2 away loss against Cádiz CF, for the season's Copa del Rey.

Pedrosa made his La Liga debut on 16 December 2018, playing the full 90 minutes in a 1–3 home loss against Real Betis. He scored his first goal in the category the following 13 April, netting the opener in a 2–1 home success over Deportivo Alavés.

On 22 May 2019, Pedrosa signed a new contract with the Pericos until 2023, being definitely promoted to the main squad.

=== Sevilla ===
On 1 July 2023, after Espanyol's relegation, Pedrosa signed a five-year contract with Sevilla FC also in the top tier. On 1 September 2025, despite being regularly used, he was loaned to fellow league side Elche CF with a buyout clause.

On 27 August 2026, Pedrosa moved to Rayo Vallecano also in the first division, on loan for one year.

== Career statistics ==
As of match played 24 October 2026

Appearances and goals by club, season and competition
Club	Season	League			Copa del Rey		Europe		Total	
Club	Season	Division	Apps	Goals	Apps	Goals	Apps	Goals	Apps	Goals
Espanyol	2018–19	La Liga	12	1	4	0	—		16	1
Espanyol	2019–20	La Liga	20	1	3	0	8 (Note: Appearances in UEFA Europa League)	2	31	3
Espanyol	2020–21	Segunda División	32	1	1	0	—		33	1
Espanyol	2021–22	La Liga	31	1	2	1	—		33	2
Espanyol	2022–23	La Liga	7	0	0	0	—		7	0
Espanyol	Total		102	4	10	1	8	2	120	7
Sevilla	2023–24	La Liga	31	1	5	1	4 (Note: Appearances in UEFA Champions League)	0	40	2
Sevilla	2024–25	La Liga	31	1	3	0	—		34	1
Sevilla	2025–26	La Liga	1	0	—		—		1	0
Sevilla	Total		63	2	8	1	4	0	75	3
Elche (loan)	2025–26	La Liga	26	1	4	0	—		30	1
Rayo Vallecano (loan)	2026–27	La Liga	6	0	0	0	—		6	0
Career total			197	7	22	2	12	2	231	11

== Honours ==
Espanyol

- Segunda División: 2020–21
