= Wu Lei =

Chinese footballer (born 1991)

Wu Lei 武磊
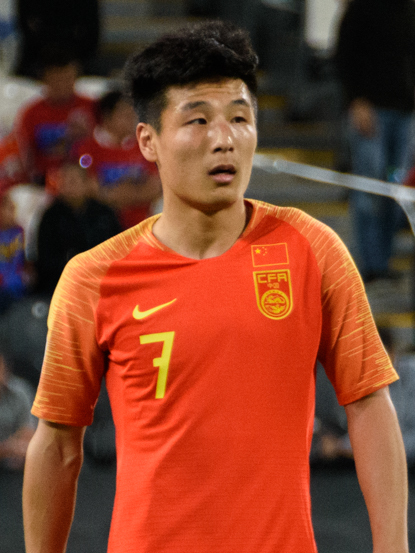
- Wu with China at the 2019 AFC Asian Cup

Personal information
- Date of birth: 19 November 1991 (age 35)
- Place of birth: Nanjing, Jiangsu, China
- Height: 1.74 m (5 ft 9 in)
- Position: Forward

Team information
- Current team: Shanghai Port
- Number: 7

Youth career
- 2003–2005: Genbao Football Academy

Senior career*
Years	Team	Apps	(Gls)
2006–2018	Shanghai Port	296	(151)
2019–2022	Espanyol	103	(10)
2022–	Shanghai Port	102	(71)

International career^{‡}
2007–2008	China U16	8	(7)
2009–2010	China U19	9	(11)
2010–	China	101	(36)
Medal record
Representing China
East Asian Football Championship
Winner	2010 Japan
Runner-up	2013 South Korea
Runner-up	2015 China
- * Club domestic league appearances and goals as of 8 November 2026 ‡ National team caps and goals as of 9 June 2026

Wu Lei
- Chinese: 武磊
Transcriptions
Standard Mandarin
- Hanyu Pinyin: Wǔ Lěi
- IPA: [ǔ lèɪ]

Wu Lei (Chinese: 武磊; pinyin: Wǔ Lěi; born 19 November 1991) is a Chinese professional footballer who plays as a forward for Chinese Super League club Shanghai Port and the China national team. Wu is widely regarded as one of the best Chinese players of his generation and one of the best Chinese forwards of all time.

He is the all-time top goalscorer for Shanghai Port with more than 200 goals, and the all-time Chinese Super League top goalscorer with 168 goals. Wu also holds the record for being the youngest player to have appeared in a Chinese professional league match, aged 14 years and 287 days. Wu is the all-time leading goalscorer for Chinese national team de jure recognized by the Chinese Football Association, with 36 goals. (Note: Hao Haidong is the all-time leading goalscorer for Chinese national team de facto with 39 goals. After political controversies occurred in 2020, Hao's data was removed from Chinese websites.)

== Early life ==
Wu was born in Nanjing and developed a passion for football at an early age. Turned down by Jiangsu Sainty's youth academy for being too small, Wu took a recommendation letter from former Chinese footballer Li Hongbing and went to Shanghai to apply for the Genbao Football Base in 2003. After watching a single training session of Wu, Xu Genbao, the founder and owner of Genbao Football Base, decided to recruit Wu. Later in 2005, Wu and his teammates joined Shanghai East Asia, which was jointly founded by Xu Genbao.

== Club career ==
=== Shanghai SIPG ===
Wu started his football career playing for third-tier side Shanghai East Asia, making his debut for the club on 2 September 2006 in a 5–3 loss against Yunnan Lijiang Dongba, making him the youngest ever player to play professional Chinese football aged 14 years and 287 days. He helped the club win the third tier title and promotion to the second tier at the end of the 2007 league season. He scored his first goal for the club on 30 August 2008 in a 2–0 win against Qingdao Hailifeng. This made him the second youngest goalscorer in Chinese football aged 16 years and 289 days, just 47 days behind Cao Yunding's record.

On 8 March 2013, Wu scored on his Chinese Super League debut, in a 4–1 away defeat at Beijing Guoan. Wu scored a hat-trick on 2 June 2013 in a 6–1 win against Shanghai Shenxin, becoming the second youngest player to score a hat-trick in the top tier. He scored his second hat-trick of the season on 18 August 2013 in a 3–2 win against Tianjin Teda. He scored his third hat-trick of the season on 27 September 2013 in a 6–1 win against Qingdao Jonoon. On 31 July 2016, Wu became the first Chinese footballer in over two years to score a hat-trick in the Chinese Super League in a 3–3 draw against Guangzhou R&F. On 18 March 2018, he scored four goals in a 5–2 win against Guangzhou R&F, becoming the second Chinese footballer to score four goals in a league match after Li Jinyu.

On 11 August 2018, Wu scored his 89th Chinese Super League goal in a 2–0 home win against Shanghai Greenland Shenhua, becoming the competition's record goalscorer, surpassing previous record of 88 by former Shandong Luneng striker Han Peng. Wu won the 2018 Chinese Super League with SIPG, while he also won the Golden Boot award with 27 goals, becoming the first Chinese footballer to win the award since Li Jinyu in 2007. Wu was also named as the Chinese Football Association Footballer of the Year at the end of the season, becoming the first Chinese footballer to win the award since Du Zhenyu in 2007.

=== RCD Espanyol ===
On 28 January 2019, Wu transferred to La Liga side RCD Espanyol for a reported fee of €2 million, signing a three-year contract with an option for an additional year. He made his debut for the club on 3 February 2019 in a 2–2 draw against Villarreal, coming on as a substitute for his teammate, Dídac Vilà in the 77th minute. It was watched by more than 40 million people in China, as he was one of the very few Chinese players to play outside of Asia. He became the second Chinese footballer to play in La Liga after Zhang Chengdong. On 9 February 2019, he came on as a substitute and earned a penalty which produced the equalizer in a 2–1 win against Rayo Vallecano. On 17 February 2019, Wu became the first Chinese footballer to start a La Liga match in a 0–0 draw against Valencia CF. Wu scored his first goal for the club on 2 March 2019 in a 3–1 win against Real Valladolid, becoming the first Chinese footballer to score in La Liga. On 24 April 2019, Wu scored his second goal for the club in a 1–1 draw against Celta. On 18 May 2019, Wu scored his third goal for the club in a 2–0 win against Real Sociedad, securing Espanyol's spot in the 2019–20 UEFA Europa League qualifying stages.

On 25 July 2019, Wu made his UEFA Europa League debut in the qualifying rounds in a 4–0 win against Stjarnan, coming on as a substitute for Esteban Granero. A month later, he scored his first goal in the same competition in a 3–0 win against Luzern. His goal, a header in the third minute, was the fastest in the club's European history and was also the first goal scored by a Chinese footballer in any European continental competition since 2013. On 3 October 2019, Wu became the first Chinese footballer ever to score in European competition, excluding qualifying stages, scoring in a 2–0 win against CSKA Moscow. On 4 January 2020, Wu became the first Chinese player to score against Barcelona, scoring a 88th-minute equaliser for Espanyol after coming on as a substitute in a 2–2 draw. The club suffered relegation at the end of 2019–20 La Liga but made an immediate return in the following year after winning the 2020–21 Segunda División. On 15 August 2021, Wu made his 100th appearance for the club in a 0–0 away draw at CA Osasuna.

=== Return to Shanghai Port ===
On 11 August 2022, Wu returned to Chinese Super League club Shanghai Port signing a contract until 2027. On 20 September 2022, Wu made his second debut for Shanghai Port in a 2–1 win against Henan Songshan Longmen. On 29 September 2022, he scored his first 2 goals after returning in a 3–0 win against Chengdu Rongcheng. On 24 October 2022, he scored a hat trick in a 7–0 win against Meizhou Hakka.

On 29 October 2023, Wu won his second league title with Shanghai Port after a 1–1 home draw against direct competitor Shandong Taishan. On 4 November 2023, he came on as a substitute and scored twice in a 3–2 away win against Dalian Professional which saw the relegation of the opponent; his second goal in the game was his 200th for the club and also his 131st in the Chinese Super League, which again tied him with former teammate Elkeson as the top goal scorer of Chinese top-division history.

On 21 September 2024, Wu scored a brace in a 4–3 away win against Changchun Yatai, brought his league tally of the season to 31 goals, surpassing Eran Zahavi's record of 29 goals in 2019 as the highest goalscorer in a single Chinese Super League season. On 2 November 2024, Wu scored another brace in a 5–0 home win against Tianjin Jinmen Tiger in the final league game of the season, helped Shanghai Port become the second team to successfully defend the Chinese Super league title, and ended his own league tally with 34 goals. Wu missed out the 2024 Chinese FA Cup final against Shandong Taishan due to injuries, but as the team won 3–1 he still garnered the first Chinese FA Cup trophy in his career.

== International career ==
Wu was called up to the Chinese under-20 national team in 2009 and scored nine goals in five matches during the 2010 AFC U-19 Championship qualification matches. His impressive goalscoring performances saw him called up to the Chinese national team for the 2010 East Asian Football Championship, making his debut on 14 February 2010 in a 2–0 win against Hong Kong.

Several months later, Wu returned to the under-20 national team for the 2010 AFC U-19 Championship and he played in four games and score two goals while he aided China to the quarterfinals by the end of the tournament. He scored his first goal for China on 28 July 2013 in a 4–3 win against Australia at the 2013 EAFF East Asian Cup.

On 11 January 2019, Wu scored twice in a 3–0 win against Philippines at the group stage of 2019 AFC Asian Cup. On 8 October 2021, Wu scored twice in a 3–2 win against Vietnam in the 2022 FIFA World Cup qualification, including heading in an injury time winner.

Wu was named in China's squad for the 2023 AFC Asian Cup in Qatar. He was heavily criticised for missing an open goal in the second group stage game against Lebanon which finished goalless. China failed to score a single goal in the tournament and was eliminated after the group stage.

Wu achieved his 100th cap for China in a 2-1 friendly victory over Singapore at the Jalan Besar Stadium on 5 June 2026, coming on in the 81st minute.

== Player profile ==
=== Style of play ===
Wu has been praised for his goalscoring exploits and off-the-ball movements. He is known for his explosive speed, especially on counterattacks. A versatile forward, Wu is capable of playing anywhere across the frontline. Although he has played as a striker and second striker, he often plays as a winger and can operate on either flank.

=== Reception ===
Wu's goalscoring prowess drew praise from former manager Gao Hongbo, who stated, "Wu's scoring ability is innate, making him a gifted player." In 2013, former mentor Xu Genbao, who has been attributed to helping develop Wu, described him as "China's Maradona". Wu's performances during the 2013 Copa del Sol caught the eye of Molde FK's manager Ole Gunnar Solskjær. Solskjær commented on Wu's footballing prowess, stating, "He is a good striker; if he moves to Molde, I think he can improve well enough to play for an English Premiership side in a year."

Wu's transfer from Shanghai SIPG to La Liga side Espanyol on 28 January 2019 drew widespread attention amongst Chinese media outlets. According to PPTV, the official broadcaster of La Liga in China, more than 25 million fans in China watched Espanyol win 3–1 against Real Valladolid, in which Wu scored his first goal for the club.

== Personal life ==
Wu is of Hui ethnicity. Wu Lei was described as a shy person in his youth, and he sought football as an effort to overcome family hardship. He married his girlfriend Zhong Jiabei (仲佳蓓) in 2014 and has two children, a daughter and a son.

== Career statistics ==
=== Club ===
As of 20 November 2026

Appearances and goals by club, season and competition
Club	Season	League			National cup (Note: Includes Chinese FA Cup, Copa del Rey)		Continental		Other (Note: Includes Chinese FA Super Cup)		Total	
Club	Season	Division	Apps	Goals	Apps	Goals	Apps	Goals	Apps	Goals	Apps	Goals
Shanghai SIPG	2006	China League Two			—		—		—			
Shanghai SIPG	2007	China League Two			—		—		—			
Shanghai SIPG	2008	China League One	24	4	—		—		—		24	4
Shanghai SIPG	2009	China League One	22	6	—		—		—		22	6
Shanghai SIPG	2010	China League One	23	10	—		—		—		23	10
Shanghai SIPG	2011	China League One	25	12	2	0	—		—		27	12
Shanghai SIPG	2012	China League One	30	17	0	0	—		—		30	17
Shanghai SIPG	2013	Chinese Super League	27	15	0	0	—		—		27	15
Shanghai SIPG	2014	Chinese Super League	28	12	0	0	—		—		28	12
Shanghai SIPG	2015	Chinese Super League	30	14	3	2	—		—		33	16
Shanghai SIPG	2016	Chinese Super League	30	14	2	1	10 (Note: Appearances in AFC Champions League)	7	—		42	22
Shanghai SIPG	2017	Chinese Super League	28	20	6	1	13	5	—		47	26
Shanghai SIPG	2018	Chinese Super League	29	27	4	1	8	1	—		41	29
Shanghai SIPG	Total		296	151	17	5	31	13	0	0	344	169
Espanyol	2018–19	La Liga	16	3	0	0	—		—		16	3
Espanyol	2019–20	La Liga	33	4	3	2	13 (Note: Appearances in UEFA Europa League)	2	—		49	8
Espanyol	2020–21	Segunda División	31	2	3	1	—		—		34	3
Espanyol	2021–22	La Liga	23	1	4	1	—		—		27	2
Espanyol	Total		103	10	10	4	13	2	0	0	126	16
Shanghai Port	2022	Chinese Super League	12	11	4	2	—		—		16	13
Shanghai Port	2023	Chinese Super League	30	18	1	0	1	0	—		32	18
Shanghai Port	2024	Chinese Super League	30	34	3	3	2 (Note: Appearances in AFC Champions League Elite)	1	1	0	36	38
Shanghai Port	2025	Chinese Super League	6	1	0	0	0	0	0	0	6	1
Shanghai Port	2026	Chinese Super League	24	7	2	1	3	1	1	0	30	9
Shanghai Port	Total		102	71	10	6	6	2	2	0	120	79
Career total			501	232	37	15	50	17	2	0	590	264

=== International ===
As of 9 June 2026

Appearances and goals by national team and year
National team	Year	Apps	Goals
China	2010	1	0
China	2011	0	0
China	2012	0	0
China	2013	10	2
China	2014	10	2
China	2015	11	2
China	2016	8	1
China	2017	8	1
China	2018	11	5
China	2019	8	5
China	2020	0	0
China	2021	10	9
China	2022	2	0
China	2023	11	5
China	2024	9	4
China	2025	0	0
China	2026	2	0
Total		101	36

As of 26 March 2024
Scores and results list China's goal tally first, score column indicates score after each Wu goal.

List of international goals scored by Wu Lei
No.	Date	Venue	Opponent	Score	Result	Competition
1	28 July 2013	Olympic Stadium, Seoul, South Korea	Australia	4–1	4–3	2013 EAFF East Asian Cup
2	15 November 2013	Shaanxi Province Stadium, Xi'an, China	Indonesia	1–0	1–0	2015 AFC Asian Cup qualification
3	4 September 2014	Anshan Sports Centre Stadium, Anshan, China	Kuwait	3–1	3–1	Friendly
4	14 October 2014	Helong Stadium, Changsha, China	Paraguay	2–0	2–1	Friendly
5	16 June 2015	Changlimithang Stadium, Thimphu, Bhutan	Bhutan	2–0	6–0	2018 FIFA World Cup qualification
6	9 August 2015	Wuhan Sports Center Stadium, Wuhan, China	Japan	1–0	1–1	2015 EAFF East Asian Cup
7	29 March 2016	Shaanxi Province Stadium, Xi'an, China	Qatar	2–0	2–0	2018 FIFA World Cup qualification
8	5 September 2017	Khalifa International Stadium, Doha, Qatar	Qatar	2–1	2–1	2018 FIFA World Cup qualification
9	26 May 2018	Jiangning Sports Center, Nanjing, China	Myanmar	1–0	1–0	Friendly
10	2 June 2018	Rajamangala Stadium, Bangkok, Thailand	Thailand	1–0	2–0	Friendly
11	2 June 2018	Rajamangala Stadium, Bangkok, Thailand	Thailand	2–0	2–0	Friendly
12	16 October 2018	Nanjing Olympic Sports Centre, Nanjing, China	Syria	2–0	2–0	Friendly
13	24 December 2018	Suheim bin Hamad Stadium, Doha, Qatar	Iraq	1–1	1–2	Friendly
14	11 January 2019	Mohammed bin Zayed Stadium, Abu Dhabi, United Arab Emirates	Philippines	1–0	3–0	2019 AFC Asian Cup
15	11 January 2019	Mohammed bin Zayed Stadium, Abu Dhabi, United Arab Emirates	Philippines	2–0	3–0	2019 AFC Asian Cup
16	10 September 2019	National Football Stadium, Malé, Maldives	Maldives	2–0	5–0	2022 FIFA World Cup qualification
17	10 October 2019	Tianhe Stadium, Guangzhou, China	Guam	2–0	7–0	2022 FIFA World Cup qualification
18	14 November 2019	Maktoum bin Rashid Al Maktoum Stadium, Dubai, United Arab Emirates	Syria	1–1	1–2	2022 FIFA World Cup qualification
19	30 May 2021	Suzhou Olympic Sports Centre, Suzhou, China	Guam	1–0	7–0	2022 FIFA World Cup qualification
20	30 May 2021	Suzhou Olympic Sports Centre, Suzhou, China	Guam	3–0	7–0	2022 FIFA World Cup qualification
21	7 June 2021	Sharjah Stadium, Sharjah, United Arab Emirates	Philippines	1–0	2–0	2022 FIFA World Cup qualification
22	11 June 2021	Sharjah Stadium, Sharjah, United Arab Emirates	Maldives	2–0	5–0	2022 FIFA World Cup qualification
23	15 June 2021	Sharjah Stadium, Sharjah, United Arab Emirates	Syria	2–1	3–1	2022 FIFA World Cup qualification
24	7 October 2021	Sharjah Stadium, Sharjah, United Arab Emirates	Vietnam	2–0	3–2	2022 FIFA World Cup qualification
25	7 October 2021	Sharjah Stadium, Sharjah, United Arab Emirates	Vietnam	3–2	3–2	2022 FIFA World Cup qualification
26	11 November 2021	Sharjah Stadium, Sharjah, United Arab Emirates	Oman	1–0	1–1	2022 FIFA World Cup qualification
27	16 November 2021	Sharjah Stadium, Sharjah, United Arab Emirates	Australia	1–1	1–1	2022 FIFA World Cup qualification
28	16 June 2023	Dalian Barracuda Bay Football Stadium, Dalian, China	Myanmar	3–0	4–0	Friendly
29	16 June 2023	Dalian Barracuda Bay Football Stadium, Dalian, China	Myanmar	4–0	4–0	Friendly
30	20 June 2023	Dalian Barracuda Bay Football Stadium, Dalian, China	Palestine	1–0	2–0	Friendly
31	10 October 2023	Dalian Sports Center Stadium, Dalian, China	Vietnam	2–0	2–0	Friendly
32	16 November 2023	Rajamangala Stadium, Bangkok, Thailand	Thailand	1–1	2–1	2026 FIFA World Cup qualification
33	21 March 2024	Singapore National Stadium, Singapore	Singapore	1–0	2–2	2026 FIFA World Cup qualification
34	21 March 2024	Singapore National Stadium, Singapore	Singapore	2–0	2–2	2026 FIFA World Cup qualification
35	26 March 2024	Tianjin Olympic Centre, Tianjin, China	Singapore	1–0	4–1	2026 FIFA World Cup qualification
36	26 March 2024	Tianjin Olympic Centre, Tianjin, China	Singapore	3–1	4–1	2026 FIFA World Cup qualification

== Honours ==
Shanghai Port

- Chinese Super League: 2018, 2023, 2024, 2025
- Chinese FA Cup: 2024
- China League One: 2012
- China League Two: 2007

Espanyol

- Segunda División: 2020–21

China PR

- East Asian Football Championship: 2010

Individual

- Chinese Football Association Footballer of the Year: 2018, 2021, 2023, 2024
- AFC Champions League All-Star Squad: 2016, 2017
- Chinese Super League Golden Boot: 2018, 2024
- Chinese Super League Domestic Golden Boot: 2013, 2014, 2015, 2016, 2017, 2018, 2024
- Chinese Super League Team of the Year: 2014, 2015, 2016, 2017, 2018, 2023, 2024
- Chinese Footballer of the Year: 2018, 2019, 2021, 2023, 2024
- AFC Asian Cup Team of the Tournament: 2019
- IFFHS AFC Man Team of the Year: 2020
- IFFHS AFC Men's Team of the Decade 2011–2020
- IFFHS Asian Men's Team of All Time: 2021
