= Fernando Calero =

Spanish footballer (born 1995)

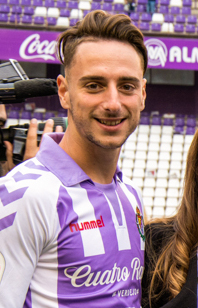
- Calero with Valladolid in 2019

Personal information
- Full name: Fernando Calero Villa
- Date of birth: 14 September 1995 (age 31)
- Place of birth: Boecillo, Spain
- Height: 1.83 m (6 ft 0 in)
- Position: Centre-back

Team information
- Current team: Málaga
- Number: 20

Youth career
- 2004–2011: Valladolid
- 2011–2014: Málaga

Senior career*
Years	Team	Apps	(Gls)
2014–2016	Málaga B	64	(2)
2016–2017	Valladolid B	37	(1)
2017–2019	Valladolid	59	(2)
2019–2026	Espanyol	158	(5)
2026–	Málaga	0	(0)
- * Club domestic league appearances and goals as of 14 July 2026

Fernando Calero Villa (born 14 September 1995) is a Spanish professional footballer who plays as a centre-back for Málaga CF.

== Club career ==
=== Málaga ===
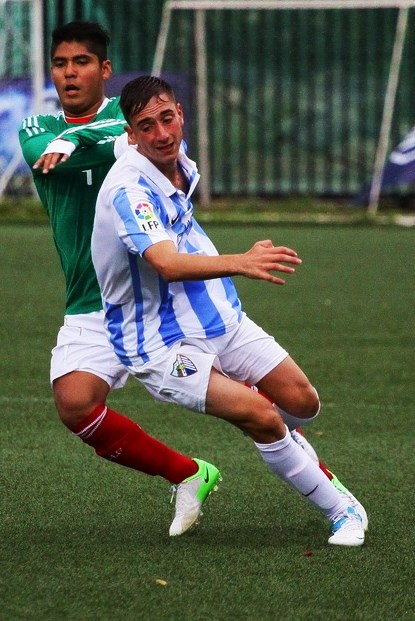
Calero playing for Málaga in 2012.

Calero was born in Boecillo, Valladolid, Castile and León, and finished his formation with Málaga CF. He made his senior debut with the reserves on 9 March 2014, starting in a 2–1 Tercera División home win against Loja CD.

Calero scored his first senior goal on 31 January 2015, netting the first in a 2–2 away draw against UD Maracena.

=== Valladolid ===
On 23 June 2016, Calero joined Real Valladolid, club he already represented as a youth, being initially assigned to the B-team in Segunda División B. In his only season with the side, he was an undisputed starter, scoring once in 37 appearances.

On 8 August 2017, Calero was definitely promoted to the main squad in Segunda División by manager Luis César Sampedro, being handed the number 5 jersey. He made his professional debut on 6 September, coming on as a substitute for fellow youth graduate Ángel in a 2–0 away win against SD Huesca, for the season's Copa del Rey.

On 15 November 2017, Calero renewed his contract until 2021. He scored his first professional goal the following 27 May, in a 2–3 away loss against Real Zaragoza, and featured regularly during the campaign as his side achieved promotion to La Liga.

Calero made his debut in the main category of Spanish football on 17 August 2018, starting in a 0–0 away draw against Girona FC.

=== Espanyol ===
On 9 August 2019, Calero agreed to a five-year contract with Espanyol for a reported fee of €8 million. His release clause was set at €40 million. On 30 August 2022, he renewed his link until 2026.

=== Málaga return ===
On 14 July 2026, free agent Calero returned to his first club Málaga, with the club now also in the top tier, on a one-year deal.

== Career statistics ==
=== Club ===
As of 23 June 2024

Appearances and goals by club, season and competition
Club	Season	League			Copa del Rey		Europe		Other		Total	
Club	Season	Division	Apps	Goals	Apps	Goals	Apps	Goals	Apps	Goals	Apps	Goals
Valladolid Β	2016–17	Segunda División B	37	1	—		—		—		37	1
Valladolid	2017–18	Segunda División	23	1	4	0	—		4 (Note: Four appearances and one goal in 2018 Segunda División play-offs)	1	31	2
Valladolid	2018–19	La Liga	36	1	0	0	—		—		36	1
Valladolid	Total		59	2	4	0	0	0	4	1	67	3
Espanyol	2019–20	La Liga	15	0	2	0	7	0	—		24	0
Espanyol	2020–21	Segunda División	28	1	3	0	—		—		31	1
Espanyol	2021–22	La Liga	16	0	2	0	—		—		18	0
Espanyol	2022–23	La Liga	27	0	2	0	—		—		29	0
Espanyol	2023–24	Segunda División	23	3	2	0	—		4 (Note: Four appearances in 2024 Segunda División play-offs)	0	29	3
Espanyol	Total		109	4	11	0	7	0	4	0	131	4
Career total			205	7	15	0	7	0	8	1	235	8
