= Adrián Pérez =

Spanish footballer

Personal information
- Full name: Adrián Pérez Galiano
- Date of birth: 4 March 2003 (age 23)
- Place of birth: Palma, Spain
- Height: 1.89 m (6 ft 2 in)
- Position: Centre-back

Team information
- Current team: Ourense
- Number: 14

Youth career
- Atlético Baleares
- 2015–2019: Villarreal
- 2019–2021: Alavés

Senior career*
Years	Team	Apps	(Gls)
2021–2024	Alavés B	75	(1)
2024–2025	Tenerife B	16	(0)
2024–2025	Tenerife	2	(0)
2025–	Ourense	14	(0)
- * Club domestic league appearances and goals as of 10 June 2026

Adrián Pérez Galiano (born 4 March 2003) is a Spanish footballer who plays as a centre-back for Ourense CF.

== Career ==
Born in Palma de Mallorca, Balearic Islands, Pérez joined Villarreal CF's youth setup at the age of 12, from hometown side CD Atlético Baleares. In 2019, he moved to Deportivo Alavés, and made his senior debut with their reserve team on 2 May 2021, starting in a 2–1 Segunda División B away loss to CD Izarra.

On 14 June 2024, Pérez left the Babazorros and signed for CD Tenerife, being initially assigned to the reserves in Segunda Federación. He made his first team debut on 31 October, starting in a 2–0 away win over CD Alfaro, for the season's Copa del Rey.

Pérez made his professional debut on 3 November 2024, coming on as a late substitute for Rubén Alves in a 1–0 Segunda División home win over CD Mirandés. The following 15 July, he moved to Primera Federación side Ourense CF.
