= Gori (footballer) =

Spanish footballer

Personal information
- Full name: Gregorio Gracia Sánchez
- Date of birth: 15 May 2002 (age 24)
- Place of birth: Arenys de Munt, Spain
- Position: Midfielder

Team information
- Current team: Juventud Torremolinos
- Number: 20

Youth career
- Calella
- Damm
- 2015–2020: Espanyol

Senior career*
| Years | Team | Apps | (Gls) |
| 2020–2024 | Espanyol B | 49 | (2) |
| 2021–2024 | Espanyol | 1 | (0) |
| 2024–2025 | Zaragoza | 0 | (0) |
| 2025 | → Ibiza (loan) | 13 | (0) |
| 2025– | Juventud Torremolinos | 24 | (1) |

International career
| 2020 | Spain U18 | 3 | (0) |
- * Club domestic league appearances and goals as of 10 June 2026

Gregorio Gracia Sánchez (born 15 May 2002), commonly known as Gori, is a Spanish footballer who plays as a midfielder for Juventud de Torremolinos CF.

== Club career ==
Born in Arenys de Munt, Barcelona, Catalonia, Gori joined RCD Espanyol's youth setup in 2015, after representing CF Damm and FPEF Calella. He made his senior debut with the reserves on 23 October 2020, coming on as a late substitute in a 2–2 Segunda División B away draw against FC Andorra.

Gori scored his first senior goal on 21 February 2021, netting the equalizer for the B's in a 1–1 home draw against UE Llagostera. On 5 August 2021, he renewed his contract with the Pericos.

Gori made his first team – and La Liga – debut on 14 August 2021, replacing fellow youth graduate David López in a 0–0 away draw against CA Osasuna. He suffered a serious knee injury in October, being sidelined for the remainder of the season.

After starting the 2022 pre-season with the main squad, Gori suffered a setback from his injury, only returning to action one year later. He departed the Pericos on 24 May 2024, as his contract was due to expire.

On 10 July 2024, Gori signed a three-year contract with Segunda División side Real Zaragoza. The following 14 January, after failing to make an appearance for the side, he was loaned to UD Ibiza in Primera Federación until the end of the season.

On 5 August 2025, Gori terminated his link with Zaragoza without debuting for the club, and signed for third division newcomers Juventud de Torremolinos CF just hours later.
