= Moha (footballer, born 1997) =

Moroccan footballer

Personal information
- Full name: Mohamed Ezzarfani
- Date of birth: 15 November 1997 (age 28)
- Place of birth: Nador, Morocco
- Height: 1.76 m (5 ft 9 in)
- Position: Winger

Team information
- Current team: Manresa
- Number: 10

Youth career
- Martorell
- Hermes
- Damm

Senior career*
Years	Team	Apps	(Gls)
2016–2017	Badalona	26	(2)
2017–2018	Barcelona B	1	(0)
2017–2018	→ Hércules (loan)	25	(5)
2018–2020	Espanyol B	56	(23)
2019–2021	Espanyol	2	(0)
2020–2021	→ Mirandés (loan)	26	(2)
2021–2023	Sabadell	18	(1)
2023	Tudelano	17	(1)
2023	Baladiyat El Mahalla	0	(0)
2023–2024	Cerdanyola del Vallès	20	(0)
2024–	Manresa	49	(13)

International career
2018–	Morocco U23	3	(0)
- * Club domestic league appearances and goals as of 13 October 2024

Mohamed Ezzarfani (born 15 November 1997), commonly known as Moha, is a Moroccan footballer who plays as a left winger for Manresa.

== Club career ==
Born in Nador but raised in Martorell, Barcelona, Catalonia, Moha represented CF Martorell, FP Hermes and CF Damm as a youth. On 28 July 2016, after finishing his formation, he joined Segunda División B side CF Badalona.

Moha made his senior debut on 21 August 2016, starting in a 1–0 home win against Lleida Esportiu. He scored his first goal on 16 October, netting the in a 1–1 draw at CD Alcoyano, and finished the season with two goals in 26 appearances.

On 17 July 2017, Moha signed a two-year contract with FC Barcelona for a fee of € 10,000; he was initially assigned to the reserves also in the third division. On 11 August, however, he was loaned to fellow league team Hércules CF for one year.

On 30 August 2018, after returning from loan, Moha terminated his contract with Barça, and agreed to a two-year deal with another reserve team, RCD Espanyol B, the following day. The following 24 May, he renewed his contract with the latter until 2022.

Moha made his first team debut on 28 November 2019, coming on as a second-half substitute for Esteban Granero in a 2–2 away draw against Ferencvárosi TC, for the campaign's UEFA Europa League. He ended the season with one further appearance with the main squad, which suffered relegation, and scored a career-best 13 goals for the B-side.

On 9 September 2020, Moha was loaned to Segunda División side CD Mirandés, for one year. He scored his first professional goal on 29 October, netting the game's only in a home success over Real Zaragoza.

On 6 August 2021, Moha agreed to a contract with Primera División RFEF side CE Sabadell FC. In August 2023, he joined Egyptian club Baladiyat El Mahalla on a free transfer.
