= Matías Vargas (footballer, born 1997) =

Argentinian footballer

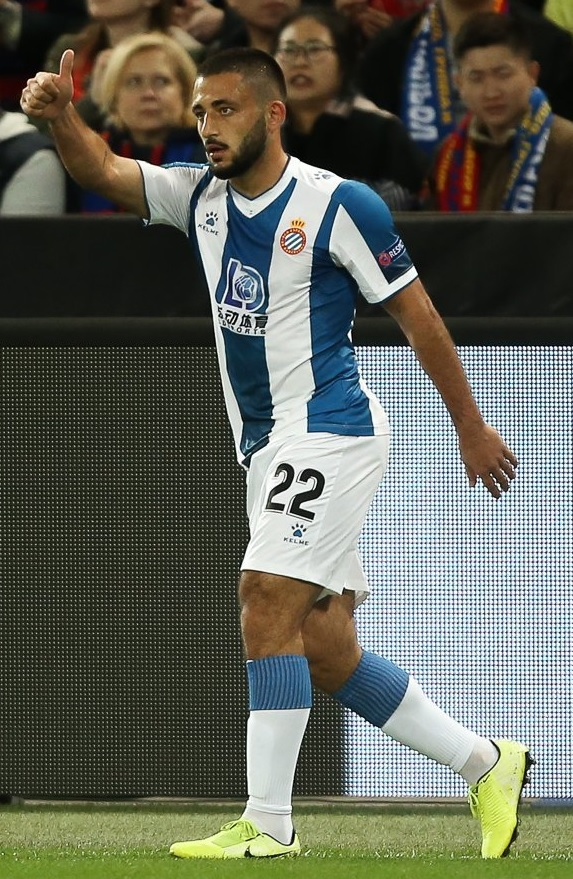
- Vargas with Espanyol in 2019

Personal information
- Full name: Martín Matías Ezequiel Vargas
- Date of birth: 8 May 1997 (age 29)
- Place of birth: Salta, Argentina
- Height: 1.68 m (5 ft 6 in)
- Position: Winger

Team information
- Current team: Gimnasia Mendoza
- Number: 8

Senior career*
Years	Team	Apps	(Gls)
2015–2019	Vélez Sarsfield	69	(14)
2019–2022	Espanyol	42	(0)
2021–2022	→ Adana Demirspor (loan)	36	(5)
2022–2024	Shanghai Port	68	(14)
2025–2026	Al Fateh	49	(15)
2026–	Gimnasia Mendoza	1	(0)

International career^{‡}
2019	Argentina U23	2	(1)
2018	Argentina	1	(0)
- * Club domestic league appearances and goals as of 14 May 2026 ‡ National team caps and goals as of 30 May 2021

Martín Matías Ezequiel Vargas (born 8 May 1997), nicknamed Monito (in English: "Little Monkey"), is an Argentine professional footballer who plays as a left winger for Gimnasia Mendoza.

== Career ==
=== Vélez Sarsfield ===
Vargas started his professional career with Vélez Sarsfield under Miguel Ángel Russo's coaching, entering the field in a 0–0 draw with Colón for the 2015 Argentine Primera División.

His first game as a starter was against Defensa y Justicia for the 2016–17 Argentine Primera División under Omar De Felippe's coaching, in which he scored a goal to help his team to a 2–1 victory. He went on to play 16 games (13 as a starter) in the season, scoring four goals.

=== Espanyol ===
On 14 July 2019, Vargas joined La Liga side RCD Espanyol on a five-year deal, for a reported club record fee of €10.5 million. He made his competitive debut in Europa League third qualifying round as a substitute and also scored a goal in a 3–0 win against Luzern.

On 25 August 2021, Vargas was loaned to Turkish Süper Lig side Adana Demirspor, for one year.

=== Shanghai Port ===
On 24 August 2022, Espanyol transferred Vargas to Chinese Super League side Shanghai Port for a fee of around £3.5 million.

On 27 December 2024, Shanghai Port announced that Vargas is leaving the club as a free agent.

=== Al Fateh ===
On 8 January 2025, Vargas joined Saudi Pro League side Al Fateh for free.

== International career ==
Vargas made his international debut for Argentina on 7 September 2018 in a 3–0 win against Guatemala.

== Personal life ==
Vargas' father Omar, nicknamed Mono, was a former footballer who played for San Martín de Mendoza and Gimnasia y Esgrima de Mendoza, among other teams.

== Career statistics ==
As of match played on 26 February 2026

Appearances and goals by club, season and competition
Club	Season	League			Cup		Continental		Other		Total	
Club	Season	Division	Apps	Goals	Apps	Goals	Apps	Goals	Apps	Goals	Apps	Goals
Vélez Sarsfield	2015	Argentine Primera División	3	0	0	0	—		—		3	0
Vélez Sarsfield	2016	Argentine Primera División	2	0	0	0	—		—		2	0
Vélez Sarsfield	2016–17	Argentine Primera División	16	4	1	0	—		—		17	4
Vélez Sarsfield	2017–18	Argentine Primera División	25	5	3	0	—		—		28	5
Vélez Sarsfield	2018–19	Argentine Primera División	23	5	2	1	—		3	0	32	6
Vélez Sarsfield	Total		69	14	6	1	—		3	0	78	15
Espanyol	2019–20	La Liga	21	0	2	0	10	5	—		33	5
Espanyol	2020–21	Segunda División	21	0	3	0	—		—		24	0
Espanyol	Total		42	0	5	0	10	5	—		57	5
Adana Demirspor (loan)	2021–22	Süper Lig	36	5	2	0	—		—		38	5
Shanghai Port	2022	Chinese Super League	18	1	4	0	—		—		22	2
Shanghai Port	2023	Chinese Super League	22	1	2	0	1	0	—		25	1
Shanghai Port	2024	Chinese Super League	28	12	4	1	5	5	1	0	38	18
Shanghai Port	Total		68	14	10	1	6	5	1	0	85	20
Al Fateh	2024–25	Saudi Pro League	20	7	—		—		—		20	7
Al Fateh	2025–26	Saudi Pro League	22	7	2	0	—		—		24	7
Al Fateh	Total		42	14	2	0	—		—		44	14
Career total			257	47	25	2	16	10	4	0	299	59

== Honours ==
Espanyol

- Segunda División: 2020–21

Shanghai Port

- Chinese Super League: 2023, 2024
- Chinese FA Cup: 2024

Individual

- Süper Lig top assist provider: 2021–22
