= Ricard Pujol =

Spanish footballer

Personal information
- Full name: Ricard Pujol Amat
- Date of birth: 4 March 1998 (age 28)
- Place of birth: Castellví de Rosanes, Spain
- Height: 1.80 m (5 ft 11 in)
- Position: Left back

Team information
- Current team: Cornellà
- Number: 15

Youth career
- AE Martorell
- Gavà
- Cornellà
- 2009–2012: Mercantil
- 2012–2013: Espanyol
- 2013–2015: Cornellà

Senior career*
Years	Team	Apps	(Gls)
2015–2019	Cornellà	34	(0)
2019–2021	Espanyol B	44	(1)
2019–2021	Espanyol	0	(0)
2021–2023	Ponferradina	18	(0)
2023–2024	Sabadell	34	(0)
2024–	Cornellà	6	(0)
- * Club domestic league appearances and goals as of 13 October 2024

Ricard Pujol Amat (born 4 March 1998) is a Spanish footballer who plays as a left back for Cornellà.

== Club career ==
Pujol was born in Castellví de Rosanes, Barcelona, Catalonia, and finished his formation with UE Cornellà. He made his first team debut at the age of just 17 on 13 December 2015, starting in a 1–2 Segunda División B away loss against Villarreal CF B.

On 7 July 2017, Pujol was definitely promoted to Cornellà's main squad, but only became a regular starter in the 2018–19 campaign. On 21 June 2019, he moved to RCD Espanyol on a two-year contract, and was assigned to the reserves in the third division.

Pujol made his first team debut for the Pericos on 19 December 2019, coming on as a late substitute for Facundo Ferreyra in a 2–0 win at Lleida Esportiu, for the season's Copa del Rey. On 23 October of the following year, he renewed his contract for a further year.

On 9 July 2021, Pujol signed a two-year deal with Segunda División side SD Ponferradina. He made his professional debut on 22 August, replacing Dani Ojeda late into a 1–0 away win over SD Eibar.

On 9 January 2023, after being rarely used during the first half of the campaign, Pujol left Ponfe.
