= 2023–24 RCD Espanyol season =

RCD Espanyol
2023–24 season
- President: Chen Yansheng
- Head coach: Luis García
- Stadium: Stage Front Stadium
- Segunda División: 4th (promoted via play-offs)
- Copa del Rey: Round of 32
- Top goalscorer: League: Martin Braithwaite (22); All: Martin Braithwaite (22)
- Highest home attendance: 20,773 vs Eldense
- Lowest home attendance: 19,520 vs Amorebieta
- Biggest win: Levante 1–4 Espanyol
Home colours	Away colours	Third colours

The 2023–24 season was RCD Espanyol's 123rd season in existence and first one back in the Segunda División, the second division of association football in Spain. They also competed in the Copa del Rey.

== Players ==
=== First-team squad ===
As of 1 February 2024

Note: Flags indicate national team as defined under FIFA eligibility rules; some limited exceptions apply. Players may hold more than one non-FIFA nationality.

No.	Pos.	Nation	Player
1	GK	ESP	Joan García
2	DF	ESP	Óscar Gil
3	DF	ESP	Sergi Gómez
4	DF	ESP	Víctor Ruiz
5	DF	ESP	Fernando Calero
6	DF	URU	Leandro Cabrera (captain)
7	FW	ESP	Javi Puado
8	MF	ALB	Keidi Bare
9	FW	SEN	Keita Baldé (on loan from Spartak Moscow)
10	MF	ESP	Pol Lozano
11	FW	ESP	Pere Milla
13	GK	ESP	Fernando Pacheco

No.	Pos.	Nation	Player
14	DF	ESP	Brian Oliván
15	MF	ESP	José Gragera
16	MF	ESP	José Carlos Lazo
17	FW	ESP	Jofre Carreras
18	MF	ESP	Álvaro Aguado
19	MF	ESP	Salvi Sánchez
20	MF	ESP	Edu Expósito
21	MF	ESP	Nico Melamed
22	FW	DEN	Martin Braithwaite
23	DF	MAR	Omar El Hilali
24	DF	ESP	Rubén Sánchez

=== Reserve team ===
Note: Flags indicate national team as defined under FIFA eligibility rules; some limited exceptions apply. Players may hold more than one non-FIFA nationality.

No.	Pos.	Nation	Player
26	DF	ESP	Joan Puig
27	MF	ESP	Roger Martínez
28	FW	ESP	Javier Hernández
29	MF	ESP	Antoniu Roca
31	FW	ESP	Sergio Rivarés
32	DF	ESP	Marc Jurado
33	GK	ESP	Ángel Fortuño
34	FW	MAR	Omar Sadik
35	DF	ESP	Alejandro Pérez

No.	Pos.	Nation	Player
36	DF	ESP	José Luis Català
37	DF	ESP	Pau Casadesús (on loan from Andorra)
38	DF	ESP	Ian Forns
39	FW	URU	Gastón Valles
40	DF	ESP	Ángel Gómez
41	GK	ESP	Llorenç Serred
42	GK	ESP	Iker Venteo
43	FW	ESP	Kenneth Soler
44	MF	ESP	Rafel Bauzà

=== Out on loan ===
Note: Flags indicate national team as defined under FIFA eligibility rules; some limited exceptions apply. Players may hold more than one non-FIFA nationality.

No.	Pos.	Nation	Player
—	FW	ESP	Joselu (at Real Madrid until 30 June 2024)
—	FW	SWE	Max Svensson (at Osasuna B until 30 June 2024)

== Transfers ==
=== In ===
Pos.	Player	Transferred from	Fee	Date	Source
DF	(Spain) Víctor Gómez	(Portugal) Braga	Loan return	30 June 2023	
MF	(Netherlands) Tonny Vilhena	(Italy) Salernitana	Loan return	30 June 2023	
FW	(Spain) Pere Milla	(Spain) Elche	€2,500,000	15 August 2023	
MF	(Spain) Salvi	(Spain) Rayo Vallecano	€700,000	19 August 2023	
DF	(Brazil) Ramon	(Greece) Olympiacos	Loan	26 August 2023	
DF	(Spain) Marc Jurado	(England) Manchester United	Undisclosed	1 September 2023	
FW	(Senegal) Keita Baldé	(Russia) Spartak Moscow	Loan	1 September 2023	

=== Out ===
Pos.	Player	Transferred to	Fee	Date	Source
DF	(Spain) Víctor Gómez	(Portugal) Sporting Braga	€2,000,000	1 July 2023	
FW	(Spain) Joselu	(Spain) Real Madrid	Loan	1 July 2023	
MF	(Netherlands) Tonny Vilhena	(Greece) Panathinaikos	€3,000,000	7 July 2023	
DF	(Spain) Álvaro García	(Spain) Fuenlabrada	Free	20 July 2023	
MF	(Spain) Álvaro Vadillo	(Spain) Racing Ferrol	Free	9 August 2023	
DF	(Spain) Wassim Keddari	(Qatar) Al-Arabi	€4,300,000	10 August 2023	
MF	(Spain) Sergi Darder	(Spain) Mallorca	€8,000,000	11 August 2023	
DF	(Spain) Miguelón	(Spain) Eldense	Free	14 August 2023	
FW	(Spain) Max Svensson	(Spain) Osasuna B	Loan	15 August 2023	
DF	(Spain) Rubén Sánchez	(Spain) Mirandés	Loan	18 August 2023	
FW	(Belgium) Landry Dimata	(Turkey) Samsunspor	Undisclosed	1 September 2023	
DF	(Mexico) César Montes	(Spain) Almería	€14,000,000	1 September 2023	

== Pre-season and friendlies ==
Win Draw Loss Fixtures

26 July 2023 Friendly	Las Palmas	1–2	Espanyol	San Pedro de Alcántara
19:00 UTC+2	Muñoz 81'		Lozano 63'; Sánchez 90'	Stadium: Banús Football Center

29 July 2023 Friendly	Espanyol	1–0	Al-Wakrah	San Pedro de Alcántara
10:30 UTC+2	Sánchez 48'	Report		Stadium: Marbella Football Center

5 August 2023 Friendly	Utrecht	3–0	Espanyol	Utrecht, Netherlands
17:00 UTC+2	Douvikas 2', 34' (pen.); Labyad 65'	Report		Stadium: Stadion Galgenwaard

== Competitions ==
=== Overall record ===
Competition	First match	Last match	Starting round	Final position	Record							
Competition	First match	Last match	Starting round	Final position	Pld	W	D	L	GF	GA	GD	Win %
Segunda División	13 August 2023	2 June 2024	Matchday 1	4th	42	17	18	7	59	40	+19	40.48
Promotion play-offs	9 June 2024	23 June 2024	Semi-finals	Winners	4	2	1	1	3	1	+2	50.00
Copa del Rey	31 October 2023	6 January 2024	First round	Round of 32	3	2	0	1	5	2	+3	66.67
Total					49	21	19	9	67	43	+24	42.86

Source: Soccerway

=== Segunda División ===
==== League table ====
Pos	Team	Pld	W	D	L	GF	GA	GD	Pts	Qualification or relegation
2	Valladolid (P)	42	21	9	12	51	36	+15	72	Promotion to La Liga
3	Eibar	42	21	8	13	72	48	+24	71	Qualification for promotion play-offs
4	Espanyol (O, P)	42	17	18	7	59	40	+19	69	Qualification for promotion play-offs
5	Sporting Gijón	42	18	11	13	51	42	+9	65	Qualification for promotion play-offs
6	Oviedo	42	17	13	12	55	39	+16	64 (Note: Oviedo finished ahead of Racing Santander on overall goal difference)	Qualification for promotion play-offs

Updated to match(es) played on 2 Jun 2024. Source: LaLiga HyperMotion
Rules for classification: 1) Points; 2) Head-to-head points; 3) Head-to-head goal difference; 4) Goal difference; 5) Goals scored; 6) Fair-play points
(Note: Head-to-head record is used only after all the matches between the teams in question have been played)
(O) Play-off winners; (P) Promoted

==== Results summary ====
Overall								Home						Away					
Pld	W	D	L	GF	GA	GD	Pts	W	D	L	GF	GA	GD	W	D	L	GF	GA	GD
42	17	18	7	59	40	+19	69	12	8	1	39	18	+21	5	10	6	20	22	−2

Source: LaLiga.com

==== Results by round ====
Round	1	2	3	4	5	6	7	8	9	10	11	12	13	14	15	16	17	18	19	20	21	22	23	24	25	26	27	28	29	30	31	32	33	34	35	36	37	38	39	40	41	42
Ground	A	H	A	H	A	H	A	H	A	A	H	H	A	H	A	H	H	A	H	A	H	A	H	A	H	A	H	A	H	A	A	H	A	H	A	H	A	H	A	H	A	H
Result	D	W	W	W	W	D	L	W	W	L	W	L	L	D	D	W	W	L	D	D	D	D	W	L	W	L	W	W	D	D	W	D	D	W	D	D	D	D	D	W	D	W
Position	9	4	2	2	2	2	4	2	1	2	1	2	4	5	6	4	4	4	5	5	5	5	3	6	2	3	2	2	2	2	2	2	3	3	3	4						

Updated to match(es) played on 21 April 2024. Source: LaLiga.com
A = Away; H = Home; W = Win; D = Draw; L = Loss

==== Matches ====
The league fixtures were unveiled on 28 June 2023.

13 August 2023 1	Albacete	1–1	Espanyol	Albacete
19:30 CEST (UTC+2)	Fuster (penalty missed) 26', (penalty missed) 43'; Olaetxea (yellow card) 61'; Glauder (yellow card) 63'; Quiles 90+3'; Ros (yellow card) 90+7'	Report	Calero 40', (yellow card) 64'; Gil (yellow card) 72'; Lozano (yellow card) 90+8'	Stadium: Carlos Belmonte; Attendance: 11,618; Referee: Adrián Cordero Vega

19 August 2023 2	Espanyol	2–0	Racing Santander	Barcelona
19:00 CEST (UTC+2)	Milla 6', (yellow card) 55'; Braithwaite 68'	Report	Zenitagoia (yellow card) 2'; Aldasoro (yellow card) 47'	Stadium: Stage Front Stadium; Referee: Raúl Martín González Francés

27 August 2023 3	Mirandés	0–1	Espanyol	Miranda de Ebro
19:30 CEST (UTC+2)	Juan María Alcedo (yellow card) 27'; Ramón (yellow card) 68'; Moreno (yellow card) 69'; Rodríguez (yellow card) 84'	Report	Lozano (yellow card) 47'; Jofre 58'; Bare (yellow card) 68'	Stadium: Estadio Municipal de Anduva; Attendance: 3,452; Referee: Saúl Ais Reig

3 September 2023 4	Espanyol	3–2	Amorebieta	Barcelona
18:30 CEST (UTC+2)	Calero 51', 81'; Salvi 78'	Report	Eraso 43'; Núñez 45+4'	Stadium: Stage Front Stadium; Attendance: 19,520; Referee: Manuel Jesús Orellana Cid

8 September 2023 5	Levante	1–4	Espanyol	Valencia
21:00 CEST (UTC+2)	Bouldini 34'	Report	Melamed 13', 56'; Puado 45+1', 84'	Stadium: Estadi Ciutat de València; Attendance: 15,548; Referee: Jon Ander González Esteban

17 September 2023 6	Espanyol	3–3	Eldense	Barcelona
18:30 CEST (UTC+2)	Braithwaite 50'; Puado 59', 90+14' (pen.)	Report	Soberón 10'; Chapela 15'; Andone 51'	Stadium: Stage Front Stadium; Attendance: 20,773; Referee: Álvaro Moreno Aragón

25 September 2023 7	Tenerife	1–0	Espanyol	Santa Cruz de Tenerife
20:00 WEST (UTC+1)	Gallego 16'	Report		Stadium: Estadio Heliodoro Rodríguez López; Attendance: 18,161; Referee: Dámaso Arcediano Monescillo

2 October 2023 8	Espanyol	3–0	Racing Ferrol	Barcelona
21:00 CEST (UTC+2)		Report		Stadium: Stage Front Stadium; Referee: Alejandro Quintero González

5 October 2023 9	Cartagena	0–2	Espanyol	Cartagena
21:30 CEST (UTC+2)		Report		Stadium: Cartagonova; Referee: Luis Mario Milla Alvendiz

9 October 2023 10	Villarreal B	3–1	Espanyol	Villarreal
21:00 CEST (UTC+2)		Report		Stadium: Estadio de la Cerámica; Attendance: 4,132; Referee: Óliver de la Fuente Ramos

14 October 2023 11	Espanyol	2–0	Valladolid	Barcelona
21:00 CEST (UTC+2)		Report		Stadium: Stage Front Stadium; Referee: Iván Caparrós Hernández

20 October 2023 12	Espanyol	0–1	Leganés	Barcelona
21:00 CEST (UTC+2)		Report		Stadium: Stage Front Stadium; Referee: Miguel Sesma Espinosa

28 October 2023 13	Sporting Gijón	2–0	Espanyol	Gijón
18:30 CET (UTC+1)	Otero (yellow card) 33' (goal) 33'; Róber Pier (yellow card) 45+3'; Gaspar Campos (yellow card) 54'; Víctor Campuzano 69'; Cote (yellow card) 75'; Đurđević (yellow card) 83'; Pașcanu (yellow card) 85'	Report	Óscar Gil (yellow card) 34'; Javi Puado (yellow card) 58'; Fernando Calero (yellow card) 84'	Stadium: El Molinón; Attendance: 19,951; Referee: (Spain) Adrián Cordero Vega

3 November 2023 14	Espanyol	2–2	Eibar	Barcelona
21:00 CET (UTC+1)	Javi Puado 45+2' 56' (pen.); Cabrera (yellow card) 90+9'	Report	Jon Bautista 6'; Álvaro Tejero (yellow card) 37'; Javi Puado 90+8' (o.g.)	Stadium: Stage Front Stadium; Attendance: 18,096; Referee: (Spain) José López Toca

12 November 2023 15	Huesca	1–1	Espanyol	Huesca
18:30 CET (UTC+1)	Blasco (yellow card) 53'; Gerard Valentín (yellow card) 63'; Ignasi Vilarrasa 78'	Report	Brian Oliván (yellow card) 33'; Edu Expósito (yellow card) 38'; Javi Puado 54' (pen.); Bare (yellow card) 90+3'; Óscar Gil (yellow card) 90+6'	Stadium: Estadio El Alcoraz; Attendance: 7,303; Referee: (Spain) Andrés Fuentes Molina

18 November 2023 16	Espanyol	2–0	Elche	Barcelona
21:00 CET (UTC+1)	Fernando Calero (yellow card) 3'; Braithwaite 14' 22'; Cabrera (yellow card) 35'; José Gragera (yellow card) 63'	Report	Josan (yellow card) 63'; Carlos Clerc (yellow card) 72'	Stadium: Stage Front Stadium; Attendance: 19,617; Referee: (Spain) Álvaro Moreno Aragón

26 November 2023 17	Espanyol	2–0	Alcorcón	Barcelona
21:00 CET (UTC+1)	Pere Milla 45+1'; Jofre Carreras 57'; Braithwaite (yellow card) 68'; José Gragera (yellow card) 85'	Report	Víctor García (yellow card) 61' (yellow-red card) 70'	Stadium: Stage Front Stadium; Attendance: 16,547; Referee: (Spain) Rafael Sánchez López

1 December 2023 18	Oviedo	2–0	Espanyol	Oviedo
20:30 CET (UTC+1)	Luismi (yellow card) 21'; Oier Luengo (yellow card) 28'; Jaime Seoane (yellow card) 28'; Masca 31'; David Costas (yellow card) 41'; Carlos Pomares (yellow card) 88'; Colombatto 90+1'	Report	El Hilali (yellow card) 33'; José Gragera (yellow card) 58'; Braithwaite (yellow card) 87'	Stadium: Estadio Carlos Tartiere; Attendance: 13,023; Referee: (Spain) Alejandro Quintero González

8 December 2023 19	Espanyol	1–1	Zaragoza	Barcelona
21:00 CET (UTC+1)	Óscar Gil (yellow card) 27'; Pol Lozano (yellow card) 52'; Edu Expósito 54'; Fernando Calero (red card) 57'	Report	Jair Amador (yellow card) 61'; Manu Vallejo 73'; Marc Aguado (yellow card) 85'; Toni Moya (yellow card) 90+7'	Stadium: Stage Front Stadium; Attendance: 21,993; Referee: (Spain) Dámaso Arcediano Monescillo

16 December 2023 20	FC Andorra	1–1	Espanyol	Andorra la Vella
16:15 CET (UTC+1)	Manu Nieto (yellow card) 42'; Iván Gil 83'	Report	Bare (yellow card) 27'; Pol Lozano (yellow card) 57'; Diego Pampín 66' (o.g.); José Gragera (yellow card) 72'; Keita (yellow card) 90+2'	Stadium: Estadi Nacional; Attendance: 3,020; Referee: (Spain) Miguel Sesma Espinosa

19 December 2023 21	Espanyol	3–3	Burgos	Barcelona
21:30 CET (UTC+1)	Braithwaite 20'; Bare (yellow card) 45+1'; Javi Puado (yellow card) 57' (goal) 81'; Sergi Gómez 64'; Óscar Gil (yellow card) 89'	Report	Appin 12'; Grego (yellow card) 15' (goal) 45+5'; Curro Sánchez (yellow card) 45+1' (goal) 75'	Stadium: Stage Front Stadium; Attendance: 13,474; Referee: (Spain) Adrián Cordero Vega

13 January 2024 22	Racing de Ferrol	0–0	Espanyol	Ferrol
21:00 CET (UTC+1)	Jon García (yellow card) 39'; David Castro (yellow card) 85'	Report	El Hilali (yellow card) 28'; Edu Expósito (yellow card) 39'; Javi Puado (yellow card) 62'	Stadium: Estadio Municipal da Malata; Attendance: 7,227; Referee: (Spain) Manuel Orellana Cid

20 January 2024 23	Espanyol	2–1	Villarreal B	Barcelona
18:30 CET (UTC+1)	Braithwaite 17' 32' (pen.); El Hilali (yellow card) 45'; Fernando Calero (yellow card) 55'	Report	Álex Forés 38'; Jorge Pascual (yellow card) 45+1'; Lanchi (yellow card) 73'	Stadium: Stage Front Stadium; Attendance: 18,249; Referee: (Spain) Rafael Sánchez López

28 January 2024 24	Eldense	3–2	Espanyol	Elda
14:00 CET (UTC+1)	Iván Chapela 9' 45+14'; David Timor (yellow card) 41'; Sergio Ortuño 55'; Piña (yellow card) 65'	Report	Braithwaite (yellow card) 8' (goal) 45' (pen.); Piña 19' (o.g.); Brian Oliván (yellow card) 45+16'	Stadium: Nuevo Pepico Amat; Attendance: 5,734; Referee: (Spain) Jon González Esteban

4 February 2024 25	Espanyol	2–1	Levante	Barcelona
18:30 CET (UTC+1)				Stadium: Stage Front Stadium

10 February 2024 26	Racing de Santander	2–0	Espanyol	Santander
21:00 CET (UTC+1)				Stadium: El Sardinero

17 February 2024 27	Espanyol	3–0	Mirandés	Barcelona
21:00 CET (UTC+1)	Braithwaite 27', 81' (pen.); Aguado 71'			Stadium: Stage Front Stadium; Referee: Luis Mario Milla Alvendiz

24 February 2024 28	Eibar	2–3	Espanyol	Eibar
18:30 CET (UTC+1)	Bautista 39'; Nolaskoain 65'		Braithwaite 77' (pen.); Salvi 90+6'; Lazo 90+9'	Stadium: Ipurua Municipal Stadium; Referee: Alejandro Quintero González

2 March 2024 29	Espanyol	0–0	Huesca	Barcelona
16:15 CET (UTC+1)	Sergi Gómez (yellow card) 34'; Bare (yellow card) 66'	Report	Gerard Valentín (yellow card) 18'; Hugo Vallejo (yellow card) 63'; Iván Martos (yellow card) 65'; Elady (yellow card) 77'; Juanjo Nieto (yellow card) 88'	Stadium: Stage Front Stadium; Attendance: 22,472; Referee: (Spain) Saúl Ais Reig

10 March 2024 30	Alcorcón	1–1	Espanyol	Alcorcón
21:00 CET (UTC+1)	Óscar Rivas (yellow card) 45+2'; Èric Callís Torrent (red card) 54'; Javier Castro (yellow card) 66'; Chema 76'	Report	Cabrera (yellow card) 6'; Keita (yellow card) 34'; Braithwaite 65'; Víctor Ruiz (yellow card) 74'; Salvi (red card) 87'; José Carlos Lazo (yellow card) 90+9'	Stadium: Estadio Municipal de Santo Domingo; Attendance: 2,521; Referee: (Spain) Jon González Esteban

17 March 2024 31	Zaragoza	0–1	Espanyol	Zaragoza
18:30 CET (UTC+1)	Alejandro Francés (yellow card) 90+7'	Report	Javi Puado 7'; Brian Oliván (yellow card) 31'; Víctor Ruiz (yellow card) 37'; Joan García (yellow card) 58'; El Hilali (yellow card) 69'	Stadium: La Romareda; Attendance: 29,468; Referee: (Spain) Dámaso Arcediano Monescillo

23 March 2024 32	Espanyol	1–1	Tenerife	Barcelona
21:00 CET (UTC+1)	Keita (yellow card) 11'; Cabrera (yellow card) 29'; José Gragera 84'; El Hilali (yellow card) 86'; Jofre Carreras (yellow card) 90+5'	Report	Nacho (yellow card) 58'; Sergio González (yellow card) 61' (goal) 90'; Álex Corredera (yellow card) 72'; Rahmani (yellow card) 86'	Stadium: Stage Front Stadium; Attendance: 21,159; Referee: (Spain) Manuel Orellana Cid

29 March 2024 33	Burgos	0–0	Espanyol	Burgos
20:30 CET (UTC+1)	Curro Sánchez (yellow card) 11'; Fer Niño (yellow card) 39'; José Antonio Caro (yellow card) 45+2'; José Joaquín Matos (yellow card) 68'	Report	Bare (yellow card) 11'; Pere Milla (yellow card) 53'; José Gragera (yellow card) 78'	Stadium: Estadio El Plantío; Attendance: 10,822; Referee: (Spain) Adrián Cordero Vega

7 April 2024 34	Espanyol	2–1	Albacete	Barcelona
18:30 CET (UTC+1)	Jofre Carreras 14'; Nico Melamed (yellow card) 33' (goal) 53'; Álvaro Aguado (red card) 65'; Javi Puado (yellow card) 70'	Report	Alberto Quiles 9' (yellow card) 79'; Antonio Glauder (yellow card) 40'; Julio Alonso (yellow card) 50'	Stadium: Stage Front Stadium; Attendance: 23,233; Referee: (Spain) Oliver De la Fuente Ramos

12 April 2024 35	Leganés	0–0	Espanyol	Leganés
20:30 CET (UTC+1)	Juan Cruz (yellow card) 10'; Sergio González (yellow card) 49'; Iker Undabarrena (yellow card) 52'; Miguel de la Fuente (yellow card) 76'	Report	Cabrera (yellow card) 4'; Gastón Valles (yellow card) 64'	Stadium: Estadio Municipal de Butarque; Attendance: 11,573; Referee: (Spain) Daniel Trujillo Suárez

21 April 2024 36	Espanyol	1–1	FC Andorra	Barcelona
14:00 CET (UTC+1)				Stadium: Stage Front Stadium

27 April 2024 37	Elche	2–2	Espanyol	Elche
18:30 CET (UTC+1)				Stadium: Estadio Martínez Valero

==== Promotion play-offs ====
9 June 2024 Semi-finals; First leg	Sporting Gijón	0–1	Espanyol	Gijón
21:00	Mesa (yellow card) 30'; Rosas (yellow card) 67'; Campuzano (yellow card) 74'	Report	Gragera (yellow card) 50'; Oliván (yellow card) 67'; Calero (yellow card) 70'; Puado 88'; Gómez (red card) 90'; Cabrera (yellow card) 90+2'; El Hilali (yellow card) 90+7'	Stadium: El Molinón; Attendance: 25,075; Referee: Jon Ander González Esteban

13 June 2024 Semi-finals; Second leg	Espanyol	0–0 (1–0 agg.)	Sporting Gijón	Cornellá/El Prat
21:00	El Hilali (red card) 90+1'	Report	Rivera (yellow card) 37'; Villalba (yellow card) 67'; Đurđević (yellow card) 90+1'	Stadium: Stage Front Stadium; Attendance: 30,605; Referee: Álvaro Moreno Aragón

16 June 2024 Final; First leg	Oviedo	1–0	Espanyol	Oviedo
18:30	Luismi (yellow card) 67'; Alemão 72'	Report	Gil (yellow card) 70'; Keita (yellow card) 87'	Stadium: Estadio Carlos Tartiere; Attendance: 29,297; Referee: Dámaso Arcediano Monescillo

23 June 2024 Final; Second leg	Espanyol	2–0 (2–1 agg.)	Oviedo	Cornellá/El Prat
18:30	Cabrera (yellow card) 21'; Moyano (yellow card) 28'; Puado 44', 45+2'; Bare (yellow card) 47'; Milla (yellow card) 64'	Report	Viti (yellow card) 40'; Seoane (yellow card) 73'	Stadium: Stage Front Stadium; Attendance: 33,107; Referee: Adrián Cordero Vega

=== Copa del Rey ===
31 October 2023 First round	Mensajero	0–2	Espanyol	Santa Cruz de La Palma
19:00 WET (UTC±0)		Report	Salvi 36', 38'	Stadium: Estadio Silvestre Carrillo; Referee: Manuel Jesús Orellana Cid

5 December 2023 Second round	Espanyol	3–1	Valladolid	Barcelona
21:00 WET (UTC±0)	Carreras 24', 43'; Bare (yellow card) 90+4'; Puado 90+6'	Report	Akinsola (yellow card) 10'; Salazar 82'; Kenedy (red card) 90+7'; Sánchez (yellow card) 90+8'	Stadium: Stage Front Stadium; Attendance: 15,464; Referee: Salvador Lax Franco

6 January 2024 Round of 32	Espanyol	0–1	Getafe	Barcelona
17:00 WET (UTC±0)	El Hilali (yellow card) 75'	Report	Óscar (yellow card) 62'; Álvarez (yellow card) 76'; Milla 87'	Stadium: Stage Front Stadium; Attendance: 15,197; Referee: Mario Melero López

== Statistics ==
=== Goalscorers ===
Position	Players	Segunda División	Play-offs	Copa del Rey	Total
FW	(Denmark) Martin Braithwaite	22	0	0	22
MF	(Spain) Javi Puado	13	1	1	15
MF	(Spain) Jofre Carreras	3	0	2	5
MF	(Spain) Nico Melamed	4	0	0	4
MF	(Spain) Pere Milla	4	0	0	4
MF	(Spain) Salvi	2	0	2	4
DF	(Spain) Fernando Calero	3	0	0	3
