= 2020–21 RCD Espanyol season =

RCD Espanyol
2020–21 season
- Owner: Rastar Group
- President: Chen Yansheng
- Head coach: Vicente Moreno
- Stadium: RCDE Stadium
- Segunda División: 1st (promoted)
- Copa del Rey: Round of 32
- Top goalscorer: League: Raúl de Tomás (23); All: Raúl de Tomás (23)
Home colours	Away colours

The 2020–21 Reial Club Deportiu Espanyol season was the club's 86th season in existence and the club's first season back in the second division of Spanish football. In addition to the domestic league, Espanyol participated in this season's edition of the Copa del Rey. The season covered the period from 1 July 2020 to 30 June 2021.

== Players ==
=== First-team squad ===
As of 1 February 2021

Note: Flags indicate national team as defined under FIFA eligibility rules; some limited exceptions apply. Players may hold more than one non-FIFA nationality.

No.	Pos.	Nation	Player
1	GK	ESP	Oier
2	DF	ESP	Miguelón (on loan from Villarreal)
3	DF	ESP	Adrià Pedrosa
4	DF	URU	Leandro Cabrera
5	DF	ESP	Fernando Calero
6	DF	ESP	Lluís López
7	FW	CHN	Wu Lei
8	MF	ESP	Fran Mérida
9	FW	ESP	Javi Puado
10	MF	ESP	Sergi Darder
11	FW	ESP	Raúl de Tomás
13	GK	ESP	Diego López

No.	Pos.	Nation	Player
14	MF	ESP	Óscar Melendo
15	MF	ESP	David López (Captain)
17	DF	ESP	Dídac Vilà (Vice-captain)
18	FW	BEL	Landry Dimata (on loan from Anderlecht)
19	MF	ESP	Álvaro Vadillo (on loan from Celta)
20	MF	ALB	Keidi Bare
22	FW	ARG	Matías Vargas
23	MF	ESP	Adri Embarba
26	MF	ESP	Pol Lozano
27	DF	ESP	Óscar Gil
33	MF	ESP	Nico Melamed

=== Reserve team ===
Note: Flags indicate national team as defined under FIFA eligibility rules; some limited exceptions apply. Players may hold more than one non-FIFA nationality.

No.	Pos.	Nation	Player
29	FW	ESP	Jofre Carreras
30	GK	ESP	Ángel Fortuño
31	DF	ESP	Ricard Pujol

No.	Pos.	Nation	Player
34	GK	ESP	Joan García
39	FW	ESP	Max Svensson

=== Out on loan ===
Note: Flags indicate national team as defined under FIFA eligibility rules; some limited exceptions apply. Players may hold more than one non-FIFA nationality.

No.	Pos.	Nation	Player
—	GK	ESP	Adrián López (at Hércules until 30 June 2021)
—	DF	ESP	Víctor Gómez (at Mirandés until 30 June 2021)

No.	Pos.	Nation	Player
—	FW	MAR	Moha (at Mirandés until 30 June 2021)

== Transfers ==
=== In ===
No.	Pos	Player	Transferred from	Fee	Date	Source
15			TBD		1 July 2020	

=== Out ===
No.	Pos	Player	Transferred to	Fee	Date	Source
15			TBD		1 July 2020	

== Pre-season and friendlies ==
Win Draw Loss Fixtures

22 August 2020 Friendly	Espanyol	1–1	Huesca	Sant Adrià de Besòs, Spain
19:30 CEST (UTC+2)	Melendo 21'	Report	Pulido 37'	Stadium: Ciutat Esportiva Dani Jarque; Attendance: 0

30 August 2020 Friendly	Cádiz	1–0	Espanyol	San Pedro de Alcántara, Spain
18:45 CEST (UTC+2)	Mauro 53'	Report		Stadium: Marbella Football Center; Attendance: 0

2 September 2020 Friendly	Espanyol	3–0	Málaga	San Pedro de Alcántara, Spain
18:45 CEST (UTC+2)	Embarba 20'; Puado 30'; Wu Lei 52'			Stadium: Marbella Football Center; Attendance: 0

5 September 2020 Friendly	Espanyol	4–0	Almería	San Pedro de Alcántara, Spain
10:00 CEST (UTC+2)	De Tomás 43'; Wu Lei 54'; Darder 61'; Campuzano 66'			Stadium: Marbella Football Center; Attendance: 0

== Competitions ==
=== Overview ===
Competition	First match	Last match	Starting round	Final position	Record							
Competition	First match	Last match	Starting round	Final position	Pld	W	D	L	GF	GA	GD	Win %
Segunda División	12 September 2020	30 May 2021	Matchday 1	Winners	42	24	10	8	71	28	+43	57.14
Copa del Rey	16 December 2020	17 January 2021	First round	Round of 32	3	2	0	1	3	2	+1	66.67
Total					45	26	10	9	74	30	+44	57.78

Last updated: 30 May 2021
Source: Soccerway

=== Segunda División ===
==== League table ====
Pos	Team	Pld	W	D	L	GF	GA	GD	Pts	Promotion, qualification or relegation
1	Espanyol (C, P)	42	24	10	8	71	28	+43	82 (Note: Head-to-head points: Espanyol: 4, Mallorca: 1)	Promotion to La Liga
2	Mallorca (P)	42	24	10	8	54	28	+26	82	Promotion to La Liga
3	Leganés	42	21	10	11	51	32	+19	73 (Note: Head-to-head points: Leganés: 4, Almería: 1)	Qualification for promotion play-offs
4	Almería	42	21	10	11	61	40	+21	73	Qualification for promotion play-offs
5	Girona	42	20	11	11	47	36	+11	71	Qualification for promotion play-offs

Source: LaLiga
Rules for classification: 1) points; 2) head-to-head points; 3) head-to-head goal difference; 4) goal difference; 5) number of goals scored
(C) Champions; (P) Promoted

==== Results summary ====
Overall								Home						Away					
Pld	W	D	L	GF	GA	GD	Pts	W	D	L	GF	GA	GD	W	D	L	GF	GA	GD
42	24	10	8	71	28	+43	82	15	3	3	41	12	+29	9	7	5	30	16	+14

Last updated: 30 May 2021.
Source: La Liga

==== Results by round ====
Round	1	2	3	4	5	6	7	8	9	10	11	12	13	14	15	16	17	18	19	20	21	22	23	24	25	26	27	28	29	30	31	32	33	34	35	36	37	38	39	40	41	42
Ground	H	H	A	A	H	A	H	A	H	A	H	A	H	A	H	A	H	A	H	A	H	A	H	A	A	H	A	H	A	H	A	H	A	H	A	H	H	A	H	A	H	A
Result	W	D	W	W	W	L	W	D	W	W	W	D	L	L	W	W	W	W	W	L	W	L	L	D	W	W	D	D	D	W	W	W	W	W	D	W	W	D	L	W	D	L
Position	1	3	2	1	1	1	1	1	1	1	1	1	2	2	2	2	2	1	1	1	1	1	2	2	2	2	2	3	3	2	2	1	1	1	1	1	1	1	1	1	1	1

Updated to match(es) played on 30 May 2021. Source: La Liga
A = Away; H = Home; W = Win; D = Draw; L = Loss

==== Matches ====
The league fixtures were announced on 31 August 2020.

12 September 2020 1	Espanyol	3–0	Albacete	Cornellà de Llobregat
21:00 CEST (UTC+2)	Melendo 14'; Wu Lei 25'; Embarba 90+1' (pen.)	Report	Á. Arroyo (yellow card) 24'; Israfilov (yellow card) 37'	Stadium: RCDE Stadium; Attendance: = 0 (Note: The match was played behind closed doors due to the COVID-19 pandemic in Spain.); Referee: Saúl Ais Reig

20 September 2020 2	Espanyol	0–0	Mallorca	Cornellà de Llobregat
16:00 CEST (UTC+2)	Mérida (yellow card) 26'; Roca (yellow card) 79' (yellow-red card) 84'	Report	Valjent (yellow card) 41'; Baba (yellow card) 63'	Stadium: RCDE Stadium; Attendance: 0 Referee: Dámaso Arcediano Monescillo

27 September 2020 3	Oviedo	0–2	Espanyol	Oviedo
18:15 CEST (UTC+2)	Tejera (yellow card) 32'; Edgar (yellow card) 62'	Report	De Tomás 65' (pen.), 69'	Stadium: Carlos Tartiere; Attendance: 0 Referee: Gorka Sagués Oscoz

4 October 2020 4	Sabadell	0–1	Espanyol	Sabadell
16:00 CEST (UTC+2)	Querol (yellow card) 71'	Report	Melamed 84'; Darder (yellow card) 87'; Da. López (yellow card) 90+4'	Stadium: Nova Creu Alta; Attendance: 0 Referee: Miguel Ángel Ortiz Arias

10 October 2020 5	Espanyol	1–0	Alcorcón	Cornellà de Llobregat
16:00 CEST (UTC+2)	De Tomás 75'	Report	Laure (yellow card) 54'; Bravo (yellow card) 65'	Stadium: RCDE Stadium; Attendance: 0 Referee: Eduardo Prieto Iglesias

18 October 2020 6	Rayo Vallecano	1–0	Espanyol	Madrid
16:00 CEST (UTC+2)	Á. García (yellow card) 34'; Catena (yellow card) 48'; Valentín (yellow card) 81'; Saveljich (yellow card) 82'; Palazón 88', (yellow card) 89'; Montiel (yellow card) 90+4'	Report	Calero (yellow card) 6'; Gil (yellow card) 78'; Cabrera (yellow card) 82'; Embarba (yellow card) 90+2'	Stadium: Campo de Fútbol de Vallecas; Attendance: 0 Referee: José Antonio López Toca

21 October 2020 7	Espanyol	2–0	Mirandés	Cornellà de Llobregat
16:30 CEST (UTC+2)	Mérida 3'; Puado 43', (yellow card) 45'	Report		Stadium: RCDE Stadium; Attendance: 0 Referee: Álvaro Moreno Aragón

25 October 2020 8	Tenerife	0–0	Espanyol	Santa Cruz de Tenerife
18:15 CEST (UTC+2)	Wilson (yellow card) 13'; Sanz (yellow card) 90+3'	Report	L. López (yellow card) 8'	Stadium: Estadio Heliodoro Rodríguez López; Attendance: 0 Referee: Jon González Esteban

28 October 2020 9	Espanyol	2–0	Ponferradina	Cornellà de Llobregat
19:00 CEST (UTC+2)	De Tomás 24'; Vargas (yellow card) 28'; Cabrera (yellow card) 38'; Embarda 48'; Pedrosa (yellow card) 88'	Report	Doncel (yellow card) 14'; Rodríguez (yellow card) 25'; Elitim (yellow card) 73'; Amo (yellow card) 76'; Yuri (yellow card) 83'	Stadium: RCDE Stadium; Attendance: 0 Referee: Luis Milla Alvendiz

2 November 2020 10	Málaga	0–3	Espanyol	Málaga
21:00 CEST (UTC+2)	Calero (yellow card) 26'; Chavarría (yellow card) 64'	Report	Embarba 7', 56', (yellow card) 42'; Miguelón (yellow card) 30'; De Tomás 51'	Stadium: La Rosaleda Stadium; Attendance: 0 Referee: Saúl Ais Reig

7 November 2020 11	Espanyol	2–1	Lugo	Cornellà de Llobregat
21:00 CEST (UTC+2)	Embarba 30'; Calero (yellow card) 35'; De Tomás 58'	Report	Carrillo 33'; El Hacen (yellow card) 39'; Juanpe (yellow card) 41'; Campabadal (yellow card) 75'	Stadium: RCDE Stadium; Attendance: 0 Referee: David Gálvez Rascón

14 November 2020 12	Fuenlabrada	1–1	Espanyol	Fuenlabrada
14:00 CEST (UTC+2)	Mula (yellow card) 17'; Cristóbal (yellow card) 43'; Juanma (yellow card) 75'; Ciss (yellow card) 82'; Gassama 87' (pen.)	Report	Darder (yellow card) 11'; De Tomás 25'; Miguelón (yellow card) 71'	Stadium: Estadio Fernando Torres; Attendance: 0 Referee: Eduardo Prieto Iglesias

20 November 2020 13	Espanyol	1–2	Girona	Cornellà de Llobregat
21:00 CEST (UTC+2)	De Tomás 40'; Da. López (yellow card) 56'; Mérida (yellow card) 70'; Embarba (yellow card) 75'; Puado (yellow card) 85'	Report	Cristóforo (yellow card) 66'; Sáiz (yellow card) 69' (goal) 88' (pen.); Bárcenas 83'	Stadium: RCDE Stadium; Attendance: 0 Referee: José López Toca

26 November 2020 14	Leganés	2–0	Espanyol	Leganés
19:00 CEST (UTC+2)	Bastón 41'; Arnaiz 47'; Pérez (yellow card) 52'	Report	Miguelón (yellow card) 28' (yellow-red card) 44'; Darder (yellow card) 90+2'	Stadium: Estadio Municipal de Butarque; Attendance: 0 Referee: Alejandro Muñiz Ruiz

29 November 2020 15	Espanyol	2–0	Zaragoza	Cornellà de Llobregat
16:00 CEST (UTC+2)	L. López (yellow card) 45+1'; Da. López (yellow card) 46'; Gil 69'; Embarba (yellow card) 78'; Darder 83'	Report	Serrano (yellow card) 51'	Stadium: RCDE Stadium; Attendance: 0 Referee: Juan Pulido Santana

2 December 2020 16	Cartagena	1–3	Espanyol	Cartagena
19:00 CEST (UTC+2)	Simón (yellow card) 18'; Carrasquilla (yellow card) 42'; Zorrilla 47'	Report	Bare (yellow card) 27'; Pedrosa (yellow card) 41'; Melamed 75'; De Tomás 80' (pen.); Puado 85'	Stadium: Estadio Cartagonova; Attendance: 0 Referee: Dámaso Arcediano Monescillo

6 December 2020 17	Espanyol	2–0	Sporting Gijón	Cornellà de Llobregat
16:00 CEST (UTC+2)	Da. López (yellow card) 68'; Embarba (yellow card) 76'; Wu Lei 88'; Darder 90+7'	Report	Campos (yellow card) 10'; S. García (yellow card) 39'; Rosas (yellow card) 90+1'; Pérez (yellow card) 90+5'; A. García (yellow card) 90+8'	Stadium: RCDE Stadium; Attendance: 0 Referee: Gorka Sagués Oscoz

13 December 2020 18	UD Logroñés	0–3	Espanyol	Logroño
14:00 CEST (UTC+2)	López (yellow card) 10'; Clemente (yellow card) 73'	Report	De Tomás 17'; Darder 42'; Puado 50'; Wu Lei (yellow card) 67'	Stadium: Estadio Las Gaunas; Attendance: 0 Referee: Jon González Esteban

20 December 2020 19	Espanyol	2–1	Almería	Cornellà de Llobregat
16:00 CEST (UTC+2)	De Tomás 9', 84' (pen.); Darder (yellow card) 25'	Report	Balliu (yellow card) 44'; Corpas 51' (pen.), (yellow card) 83'	Stadium: RCDE Stadium; Attendance: 0 Referee: Miguel Ortíz Arias

3 January 2021 20	Las Palmas	1–0	Espanyol	Las Palmas
16:00 CEST (UTC+2)	Rober 26'; Lemos (yellow card) 35'; Ruiz (yellow card) 66'; Castellano (yellow card) 76'; Espiau (yellow card) 90+2'; Mendes (yellow card) 90+4'; Domínguez (yellow card) 90+5'	Report	L. López (red card) 49'; Di. López (yellow card) 67'; Cabrera (yellow card) 80'	Stadium: Estadio Gran Canaria; Attendance: 0 Referee: Daniel Ocón Arráiz

10 January 2021 21	Espanyol	2–0	Castellón	Cornellà de Llobregat
21:00 CEST (UTC+2)	Melamed 7', (yellow card) 31'; Puado 36'; Embarba (yellow card) 80'	Report		Stadium: RCDE Stadium; Attendance: 0 Referee: Óliver de la Fuente Ramos

23 January 2021 22	Girona	1–0	Espanyol	Girona
18:15 CET (UTC+1)	Moreno 41'; Franquesa (yellow card) 45'; Bueno (yellow card) 71'	Report	Embarba (yellow card) 74'; Da. López (yellow card) 75'	Stadium: Estadi Municipal de Montilivi; Attendance: 0 Referee: Juan Luis Pulido Santana

31 January 2021 23	Espanyol	2–3	Rayo Vallecano	Cornellà de Llobregat
16:00 CET (UTC+1)	Puado 8'; De Tomás 39'; Bare (yellow card) 66'; Darder (yellow card) 76'; Embarba (yellow card) 78'; Pedrosa (yellow card) 79'	Report	Isi 48', (yellow card) 49'; Valentín (yellow card) 66'; Trejo (yellow card) 68'; Montiel 79'; Qasmi (yellow card) 80'; García 83'	Stadium: RCDE Stadium; Attendance: 0 Referee: Jon Ander González Esteban

8 February 2021 24	Lugo	1–1	Espanyol	Lugo
21:00 CET (UTC+1)	Marcelo (yellow card) 4' (yellow-red card) 83'; Campabadal 9'; Juanpe (yellow card) 58'; Canella (yellow card) 80'; Cantero (yellow card) 90'; Seoane (yellow card) 90+1'	Report	Miguelón (yellow card) 20'; De Tomás 71'; Vadillo (yellow card) 90+3'	Stadium: Anxo Carro; Attendance: 0 Referee: Miguel Ángel Ortiz Arias

14 February 2021 25	Mallorca	1–2	Espanyol	Palma
14:00 CET (UTC+1)	De Galarreta (yellow card) 32'; Amath 52'; Oliván (yellow card) 80'	Report	Puado 33'; Dimata 73'	Stadium: Visit Mallorca Stadium; Attendance: 0 Referee: Dámaso Arcediano Monescillo

20 February 2021 26	Espanyol	1–0	Sabadell	Cornellà de Llobregat
16:00 CET (UTC+1)	De Tomás 52', (yellow card) 82'; Vadillo (yellow card) 76'; Pedrosa (yellow card) 85'; Mérida (yellow card) 90+4'	Report		Stadium: RCDE Stadium; Attendance: 0 Referee: Daniel Ocón Arráiz

28 February 2021 27	Sporting Gijón	1–1	Espanyol	Gijón
16:00 CET (UTC+1)	Fuego (yellow card) 8'; Đurđević (yellow card) 9', (goal) 23'; García (yellow card) 67'; Rosas (yellow card) 70'	Report	Embarba 12'; Cabrera (yellow card) 30'; Pedrosa (yellow card) 49'	Stadium: El Molinón; Attendance: 0 Referee: Luis Mario Milla Alvendiz

5 March 2021 28	Espanyol	1–1	Oviedo	Cornellà de Llobregat
21:00 CET (UTC+1)	Melendo 9'; Vilà (red card) 38'; De Tomás (yellow card) 46'	Report	Ahijado (yellow card) 53'; Nahuel 67'; Sangalli (yellow card) 78'; Grippo (yellow card) 83'	Stadium: RCDE Stadium; Attendance: 0 Referee: Daniel Jesús Trujillo Suárez

13 March 2021 29	Mirandés	2–2	Espanyol	Miranda de Ebro
21:00 CET (UTC+1)	Meseguer 5'; Moreno 89'	Report	De Tomás 32'; Darder (yellow card) 73'; Melamed 90+5'	Stadium: Estadio Municipal de Anduva; Attendance: 0 Referee: Jon Ander González Esteban

20 March 2021 30	Espanyol	4–0	UD Logroñés	Cornellà de Llobregat
21:00 CET (UTC+1)	Puado 22'; Embarba 25'; Pedrosa 26'; Dimata 70'	Report	Nano (yellow card) 21'; Sierra (yellow card) 36' (yellow-red card) 80'	Stadium: RCDE Stadium; Attendance: 0 Referee: Juan Luis Pulido Santana

26 March 2021 31	Castellón	1–3	Espanyol	Castellón de la Plana
21:00 CET (UTC+1)	Mateu 13' (pen.); Indias (yellow card) 23' (yellow-red card) 35'	Report	Dimata (yellow card) 30'; Da. López 32'; Darder 42', 49'; Calero (yellow card) 77'	Stadium: Nou Estadi Castàlia; Attendance: 0 Referee: Aitor Gorostegui Fernández-Ortega

1 April 2021 32	Espanyol	4–0	Fuenlabrada	Cornellà de Llobregat
17:00 CEST (UTC+2)	De Tomás 18' (pen.), 65'; Embarba 29'; Cabrera (yellow card) 33'; Pulido 41' (o.g.); Mérida (yellow card) 77'	Report	Nteka (red card) 17'; Iribas (yellow card) 33'; Garcés (yellow card) 45+2'; Valentín (yellow card) 79'; Salvador (yellow card) 87'	Stadium: RCDE Stadium; Attendance: 0 Referee: Iosu Galech Apezteguía

4 April 2021 33	Albacete	0–3	Espanyol	Albacete
16:00 CEST (UTC+2)	Torres (yellow card) 24'; Diamanka (yellow card) 30'	Report	Pedrosa (yellow card) 13'; De Tomás (penalty missed) 39', 39', 90+5'; Calero (yellow card) 49', (goal) 64'	Stadium: Carlos Belmonte; Attendance: 0 Referee: José Antonio López Toca

11 April 2021 34	Espanyol	2–1	Leganés	Cornellà de Llobregat
21:00 CEST (UTC+2)	Darder 1'; De Tomás (penalty missed) 19'; Melamed 73'	Report	Omeruo (yellow card) 24'; Miguel 51'; Eraso (yellow card) 81'; Pérez (yellow card) 90+5'	Stadium: RCDE Stadium; Attendance: 0 Referee: Javier Iglesias Villanueva

19 April 2021 35	Almería	1–1	Espanyol	Almería
21:00 CEST (UTC+2)	Sadiq 50'; Makaridze (yellow card) 71'	Report	Dimata 58'; De Tomás (penalty missed) 69'; Darder (yellow card) 74'	Stadium: Estadio de los Juegos Mediterráneos; Attendance: 0 Referee: David Gálvez Rascón

24 April 2021 36	Espanyol	4–0	Las Palmas	Cornellà de Llobregat
18:15 CEST (UTC+2)	Puado 9', 14', 23'; Calero (yellow card) 20'; Embarba 49' (pen.); Dimata (yellow card) 52'	Report	Lemos (yellow card) 32' (yellow-red card) 40'; Curbelo (yellow card) 50'	Stadium: RCDE Stadium; Attendance: 0 Referee: Álvaro Moreno Aragón

2 May 2021 37	Espanyol	3–0	Málaga	Cornellà de Llobregat
16:00 CEST (UTC+2)	De Tomás 15', 77'; Puado 40'; Embarba (yellow card) 44'; Bare (yellow card) 66'; Lozano (yellow card) 85'	Report	González (yellow card) 45'	Stadium: RCDE Stadium; Attendance: 0 Referee: Miguel Ángel Ortiz Arias

8 May 2021 38	Zaragoza	0–0	Espanyol	Zaragoza
18:15 CEST (UTC+2)	Bermejo (yellow card) 41'; Zapater (yellow card) 57'	Report	Dimata (yellow card) 45+3'	Stadium: La Romareda; Attendance: 0 Referee: Juan Luis Pulido Santana

14 May 2021 39	Espanyol	0–2	Cartagena	Cornellà de Llobregat
21:00 CEST (UTC+2)	Embarba (yellow card) 55'; Cabrera (yellow card) 90+3'	Report	Delmás 22'; Castro 52' (pen.)	Stadium: RCDE Stadium; Attendance: 0 Referee: Iñaki Vicandi Garrido

18 May 2021 40	Ponferradina	1–4	Espanyol	Ponferrada
21:30 CEST (UTC+2)	Curro (yellow card) 35'; García (yellow card) 45+1'; Darder 51' (o.g.); Sielva (yellow card) 60'; Morán (yellow card) 62'; Ríos (yellow card) 85'	Report	Dimata 1', 54'; Puado 8' (pen.); Da. López (yellow card) 40'; Melamed 90+2'	Stadium: El Toralín; Attendance: 0 Referee: Rafael Sánchez López

23 May 2021 41	Espanyol	1–1	Tenerife	Cornellà de Llobregat
18:15 CEST (UTC+2)	Pedrosa (yellow card) 43'; De Tomás 62', (yellow card) 70'; Embarba (yellow card) 85'; Darder (red card) 90'; Di. López (yellow card) 90'	Report	Pomares 5', (yellow card) 66'; Nono (yellow card) 49'; Serantes (yellow card) 90'	Stadium: RCDE Stadium; Attendance: 0 Referee: Óliver de la Fuente Ramos

30 May 2021 42	Alcorcón	1–0	Espanyol	Alcorcón
21:00 CEST (UTC+2)	Fraile 33'	Report	Melamed (yellow card) 50'	Stadium: Santo Domingo; Attendance: 0 Referee: Iosu Galech Apezteguía

=== Copa del Rey ===
16 December 2020 First round	Llagostera	0–1 (a.e.t.)	Espanyol	Llagostera
19:00 CET (UTC+1)	Martínez (yellow card) 11'; Monreal (red card) 65'	Report	Vilà (yellow card) 17'; Puado 93'	Stadium: Estadi Municipal de Llagostera; Attendance: 0 Referee: Daniel Trujillo Suárez

6 January 2021 Second round	Burgos	0–2	Espanyol	Burgos
19:00 CET (UTC+1)	Navarro (yellow card) 86'	Report	Wu Lei 57'; Svensson 90+3'	Stadium: El Plantío; Referee: José Antonio López Toca

17 January 2021 Round of 32	Espanyol	0–2	Osasuna	Cornellà de Llobregat
12:00 CET (UTC+1)	Gil (yellow card) 50'; De Tomás (yellow card) 84'	Report	Martínez 9', (yellow card) 51'; Barja 29'; Gallego (yellow card) 34'; Budimir (yellow card) 45+1'	Stadium: RCDE Stadium; Referee: Mario Melero López

== Statistics ==
=== Appearances and goals ===
Last updated 30 May 2021

No.	Pos	Nat	Player	Total		Segunda División		Copa del Rey	
No.	Pos	Nat	Player	Apps	Goals	Apps	Goals	Apps	Goals
Goalkeepers
1	GK	(Spain) ESP	Oier	5	0	2	0	3	0
13	GK	(Spain) ESP	Diego López	40	0	40	0	0	0
Defenders
2	DF	(Spain) ESP	Miguelón	21	0	17+2	0	2	0
3	DF	(Spain) ESP	Adrià Pedrosa	33	1	31+1	1	0+1	0
4	DF	(Uruguay) URU	Leandro Cabrera	39	0	36+2	0	1	0
5	DF	(Spain) ESP	Fernando Calero	31	1	23+5	1	3	0
6	DF	(Spain) ESP	Lluís López	20	0	12+7	0	1	0
17	DF	(Spain) ESP	Dídac Vilà	14	0	7+4	0	3	0
27	DF	(Spain) ESP	Óscar Gil	33	1	22+10	1	1	0
31	DF	(Spain) ESP	Ricard Pujol	1	0	0	0	1	0
40	DF	(Morocco) MAR	Omar El Hilali	3	0	1+2	0	0	0
Midfielders
8	MF	(Spain) ESP	Fran Mérida	39	1	13+23	1	3	0
10	MF	(Spain) ESP	Sergi Darder	41	6	35+5	6	0+1	0
14	MF	(Spain) ESP	Óscar Melendo	29	2	22+6	2	1	0
15	MF	(Spain) ESP	David López	38	1	36+1	1	1	0
19	MF	(Spain) ESP	Álvaro Vadillo	14	0	0+12	0	0+2	0
20	MF	(Albania) ALB	Keidi Bare	29	0	20+7	0	0+2	0
22	MF	(Argentina) ARG	Matías Vargas	24	0	8+13	0	3	0
26	MF	(Spain) ESP	Pol Lozano	26	0	1+23	0	2	0
33	MF	(Spain) ESP	Nico Melamed	36	6	12+21	6	1+2	0
Forwards
7	FW	(China) CHN	Wu Lei	34	3	8+23	2	3	1
9	FW	(Spain) ESP	Javi Puado	39	13	28+9	12	1+1	1
11	FW	(Spain) ESP	Raúl de Tomás	38	23	33+4	23	0+1	0
18	FW	(Belgium) BEL	Landry Dimata	20	5	14+5	5	0+1	0
23	FW	(Spain) ESP	Adri Embarba	40	9	37+1	9	1+1	0
29	FW	(Spain) ESP	Jofre Carreras	5	0	0+3	0	1+1	0
39	FW	(Spain) ESP	Max Svensson	5	1	0+3	0	0+2	1
Players who have made an appearance or had a squad number this season but have left the club
18	MF	(Spain) ESP	Álex Lopez	0	0	0	0	0	0
21	MF	(Spain) ESP	Marc Roca	2	0	0+2	0	0	0
24	FW	(Spain) ESP	Víctor Campuzano	5	0	0+4	0	1	0

=== Goalscorers ===
As of 5 March 2021

Rank	No.	Pos	Nat	Name	Segunda División	Copa del Rey	Total
1	11	FW	(Spain)	Raúl de Tomás	15	0	15
2	9	FW	(Spain)	Javi Puado	6	1	7
3	23	MF	(Spain)	Adri Embarba	6	0	6
4	7	FW	(China)	Wu Lei	2	1	3
4	10	MF	(Spain)	Sergi Darder	3	0	3
4	33	MF	(Spain)	Nico Melamed	3	0	3
7	14	MF	(Spain)	Óscar Melendo	2	0	2
8	8	MF	(Spain)	Fran Mérida	1	0	1
8	18	FW	(Belgium)	Landry Dimata	1	0	1
8	27	DF	(Spain)	Óscar Gil	1	0	1
8	39	FW	(Spain)	Max Svensson	0	1	1
Totals					40	3	43
