= Forns =

Forns is a Spanish surname. Notable people with the surname include:

- Albert Forns i Canal (born 1982), Catalan journalist, writer, and poet
- Brenton Cabello Forns (born 1981), Spanish medley swimmer
- Ian Forns (born 2004), Spanish professional footballer
- Romà Forns (1885–1942), Spanish footballer
