= Pol Lozano =

Spanish footballer

Personal information
- Full name: Pol Lozano Vizuete
- Date of birth: 6 October 1999 (age 27)
- Place of birth: Sant Quirze del Vallès, Spain
- Height: 1.76 m (5 ft 9 in)
- Position: Midfielder

Team information
- Current team: Espanyol
- Number: 10

Youth career
- Mercantil
- 2006–2017: Espanyol

Senior career*
Years	Team	Apps	(Gls)
2017–2020	Espanyol B	72	(2)
2019–	Espanyol	119	(2)
2021–2022	→ Girona (loan)	31	(1)
2023	→ Granada (loan)	14	(0)

International career
2014–2015	Spain U16	9	(0)
2015–2016	Spain U17	12	(1)
2017–2018	Spain U19	5	(0)
2019	Spain U21	4	(0)
2025–	Catalonia	1	(0)
- * Club domestic league appearances and goals as of 27 May 2026

Pol Lozano Vizuete (born 6 October 1999) is a Spanish professional footballer who plays as a central midfielder for RCD Espanyol.

== Club career ==
Born in Sant Quirze del Vallès, Barcelona, Catalonia, Lozano joined RCD Espanyol's youth setup in 2006, from CE Mercantil. He made his senior debut with the reserves on 14 May 2017, starting in a 2–3 Segunda División B away loss against CE Sabadell, as his side was already relegated.

Lozano scored his first senior goal on 15 October 2017, netting his team's second in a 2–2 home draw against Terrassa FC. The following 4 July, after achieving promotion, he renewed his contract until 2023, being definitely promoted to the main squad for the 2019–20 campaign.

Lozano made his professional debut on 15 August 2019, coming on as a second-half substitute for Sergi Darder in a 3–0 home defeat of FC Luzern, for the season's UEFA Europa League. He made his La Liga debut on 7 December, playing the last 18 minutes in a 0–2 loss at Real Madrid.

On 30 August 2021, Lozano was loaned to Segunda División side Girona FC, for one year. He scored his first professional goal four days later, netting his team's only in a 2–1 home loss against Sporting de Gijón.

After starting the 2022–23 season at Espanyol, on 30 January 2023 Lozano joined second division club Granada CF on loan until the end of the season.

== Career statistics ==
As of 23 June 2024

Appearances and goals by club, season and competition
Club	Season	League			Copa del Rey		Europe		Other		Total	
Club	Season	Division	Apps	Goals	Apps	Goals	Apps	Goals	Apps	Goals	Apps	Goals
Espanyol	2019–20	La Liga	5	0	2	0	7	0	—		14	0
Espanyol	2020–21	Segunda División	24	0	2	0	—		—		26	0
Espanyol	2022–23	La Liga	4	0	2	0	—		—		6	0
Espanyol	2023–24	Segunda División	22	0	2	0	—		1 (Note: Appearances in promotion play-offs)	0	25	0
Espanyol	Total		55	0	8	0	7	0	4	0	74	0
Girona (loan)	2021–22	Segunda División	27	1	4	0	—		4	0	35	1
Granada (loan)	2022–23	Segunda División	14	0	—		—		—		14	0
Career total			96	1	12	0	7	0	5	0	120	1

== Honours ==
=== Club ===
Granada

- Segunda División: 2022–23

=== International ===
Spain U17

- UEFA European Under-17 Championship runner-up: 2016
