= Keidi Bare =

Albanian footballer (born 1997)

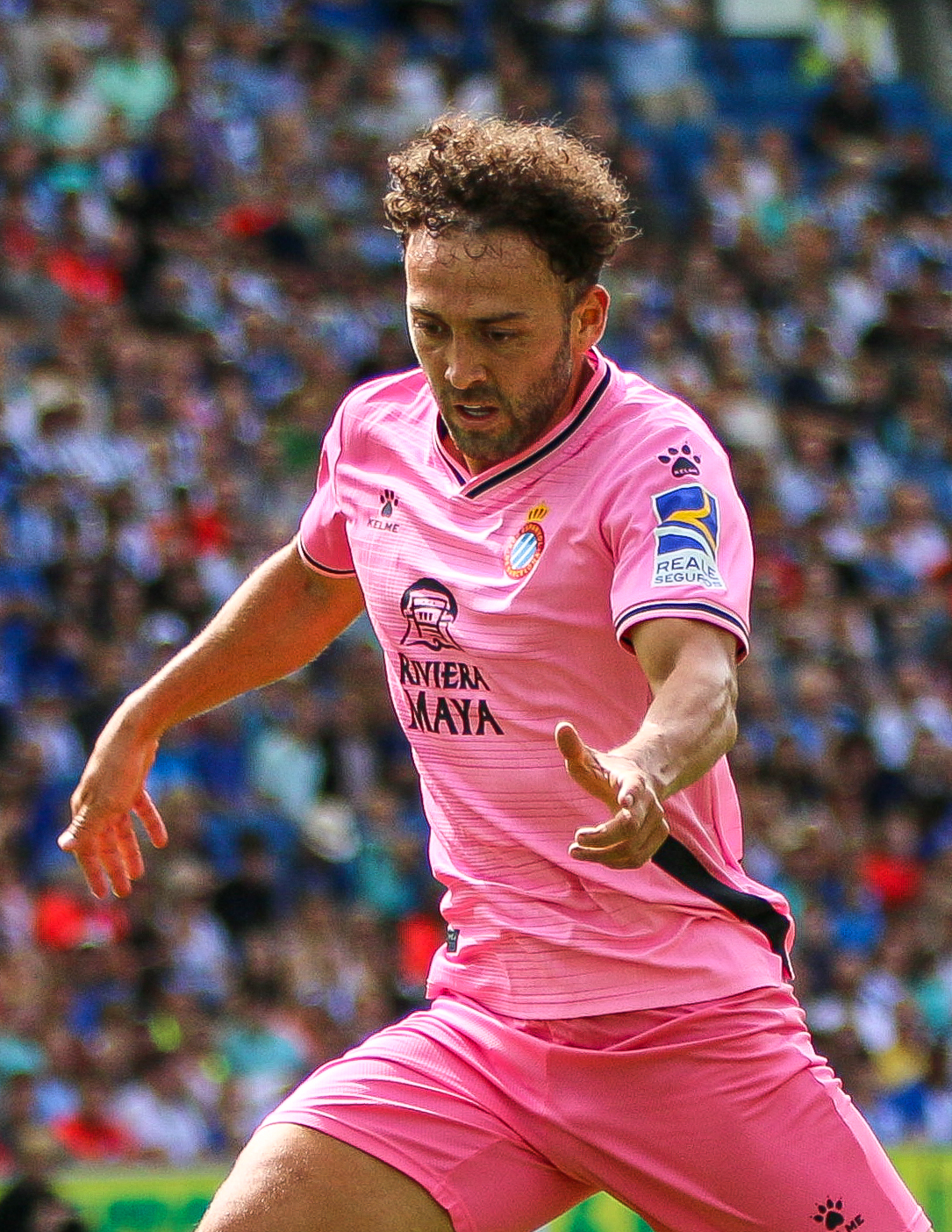
- Bare with Espanyol in 2022

Personal information
- Date of birth: 28 August 1997 (age 29)
- Place of birth: Fier, Albania
- Height: 1.74 m (5 ft 9 in)
- Position: Midfielder

Team information
- Current team: Volos
- Number: 88

Youth career
- 2010–2013: Olimpic
- 2013–2014: Apolonia
- 2014–2016: Atlético Madrid

Senior career*
Years	Team	Apps	(Gls)
2013–2014	Apolonia	2	(0)
2016–2018	Atlético Madrid B	66	(4)
2018–2019	Málaga B	11	(0)
2018–2020	Málaga	48	(1)
2020–2024	Espanyol	105	(1)
2024–2026	Zaragoza	46	(0)
2026–	Volos	7	(0)

International career^{‡}
2013–2014	Albania U17	6	(1)
2014–2015	Albania U19	2	(0)
2015–2019	Albania U21	11	(0)
2018–	Albania	29	(2)
- * Club domestic league appearances and goals as of 7 November 2026 ‡ National team caps and goals as of 22:00, 25 March 2024 (UTC)

Keidi Bare (born 28 August 1997) is an Albanian professional footballer who plays as a midfielder for Super League Greece club Volos.

Bare began his senior career with Apolonia before moving to Spain, where he played regularly for Atlético Madrid B, Málaga, Espanyol and Real Zaragoza. In 2017, he became the first Albanian to appear for Atlético Madrid's first team, making his debut in the Copa del Rey. Later with Espanyol he gained promotion to La Liga in 2021 and 2024.

== Club career ==
=== Apolonia ===
Born in Fier, Bare started his youth career for Olimpic CF in January 2010 and after 2 1/2 seasons there he moved to his hometown's club Apolonia. He progressed through ranks and in the 2013–14 season he played with the under-19 team making 18 appearances in which he scored 4 goals. He was brought at the senior squad for the first time at the age of 16 for the cup match against Tërbuni in which he didn't play. He debuted professionally on 9 November 2013 in the away win over Pogradeci, entering in the second half. In December 2013 he had a trial at Spanish giants Atlético Madrid.

=== Atlético Madrid ===
On 26 December 2013, Bare successfully become an Atlético Madrid player after passing the trial at mini-tournament at Tbilisi, Georgia where was also named the best midfielder.

He was brought for the first time to senior squad by manager Diego Simeone in January 2017 for the Copa del Rey match against Las Palmas, where he also debuted by playing in the last minutes in place of Ángel Correa, becoming the first Albanian to appear for Atlético Madrid's first team.{ While at Atlético Madrid B, Bare helped the team's promotion to Segunda División B after beating in a two-legged match Gimnástica de Torrelavega 3–0 on aggregate, with Bare scoring in the second leg.

Bare was assigned to first squad after they were banned from signing new players. He made his first appearance for the 2017–18 season on 25 October by playing as a starter in the 1–1 draw at Elche in the 2017–18 Copa del Rey round of 32.

=== Málaga ===
On 31 August 2018, Bare was transferred to Málaga CF and joined their reserve team in the third division. While at Málaga B, Bare was an undisputed starter, playing every match full 90 minutes. However, shortly after, he was promoted to the senior squad, making his debut in the Segunda División on 11 November in the 2–2 away draw against Sporting de Gijón.

Bare established himself as a regular starter for the main squad from January 2019, and featured in both matches of the promotion play-offs as his side was knocked out by Deportivo de La Coruña. On 13 July 2020, he scored his first professional goal in a 2–1 loss at Sporting Gijón.

=== Espanyol ===
On 22 September 2020, Bare joined RCD Espanyol on a four-year contract, following the club's relegation from 2019–20 La Liga to the Segunda División. Bare made his debut on 4 October 2020, coming on as a late substitute in a 1–0 away win over Sabadell and becoming the first Albanian to play for Espanyol. On 2 December, Bare made his first start in a 3–1 away win over Cartagena, replacing David López in the starting line-up. By February 2021, Bare had established himself as a regular starter, having started 12 consecutive matches for Espanyol. In April 2021, Bare was highlighted among Espanyol's regular starters during the club's promotion campaign, alongside former Málaga teammates Sergi Darder and Fernando Calero. After Espanyol secured promotion in May 2021, Bare was rested for a league match against Cartagena, which the club lost 2–0, ending a 15-match unbeaten run.

Bare made his La Liga debut on 14 August 2021, coming on in the 62nd minute for Fran Mérida in a 0–0 away draw against Osasuna on the opening matchday of the 2021–22 season. On 3 October 2021, Bare played the full match and provided an assist for Raúl de Tomás in Espanyol's 2–1 home victory over Real Madrid, their first league win of the season. On 27 February 2022, Bare scored his first La Liga goal in a 5–1 away defeat to Villarreal CF, netting Espanyol's only goal in the 65th minute. In March, Bare suffered an injury for the fourth time while on international duty with Albania. On 28 April, Espanyol announced that Bare would miss the remainder of the season after sustaining a left knee hyperextension and distension during a match against Rayo Vallecano the previous week.

At the start of the 2022–23 season, Bare suffered a thigh injury shortly after coming on as a half-time substitute in a 1–0 away win over Athletic Bilbao on 4 September, forcing him to miss several matches. On 20 October 2022, Bare made his first start of the season in a 1–0 away defeat to Osasuna, having regained fitness and impressed as a substitute in the preceding match against Real Valladolid. On 1 April 2023, Bare returned to action after a three-month absence, coming on as a substitute in a 2–1 away defeat to Girona in La Liga. On 27 April, Bare made his first start in La Liga in nearly six months in a 4–2 away defeat to Villarreal, playing 67 minutes. Bare featured in Espanyol's final matches of the season as the club fought to avoid relegation, but could not prevent their drop to the Segunda División following a 2–2 away draw against Valencia CF on 28 May.

On 4 February 2024, Bare made his 100th appearance for Espanyol, coming on as a substitute in a 2–1 win over Levante and becoming one of the club's centurions. Later that month, Bare made his first start in nearly two months in a 3–0 home win over CD Mirandés, helping create the opening goal and contributing to the second. Bare started both legs of Espanyol's promotion play-off semi-final against Sporting de Gijón, helping the club advance to the final with a 1–0 aggregate victory after a 0–0 draw in the second leg on 13 June. Bare started both legs of the promotion play-off final against Real Oviedo, playing the full match in a 1–0 away defeat on 16 June before helping Espanyol overturn the deficit with a 2–0 home victory a week later, securing promotion to La Liga with a 2–1 aggregate win.

Following the expiration of his contract, he left the club having made 119 appearances in all competitions.

=== Zaragoza ===
On 26 July 2024, Bare joined Real Zaragoza in the Segunda División as a free agent on a three-year contract, becoming the club's first signing of the summer transfer window. He made his debut on 16 August, starting in a 4–0 away win over Cádiz on the opening matchday of the 2024–25 season. In September, Bare was named one of Real Zaragoza's four captains for the season, following a vote involving the squad and coaching staff. After establishing himself in the midfield, he suffered a grade-two hamstring injury during a match against Elche CF on 8 September, which kept him out for approximately a month. Further injuries, including a soleus muscle injury in March 2025 and a recurrence the following month, ruled him out for the remainder of the season; he had missed up to 20 matches during the campaign.

Bare retained his place among Zaragoza's captains for the 2025–26 season. His second campaign was again disrupted by injuries, including an appendectomy in October 2025 and subsequent muscle problems, which forced him to miss several periods of the season. He returned in March 2026 for Zaragoza's fight against relegation, having missed up to 14 matches through injury, and featured in the team's six victories up to that point. Zaragoza were relegated to the Primera Federación at the end of the season, while Bare publicly apologised to the club's supporters and called for a reassessment of the club's sporting direction. The club announced on 8 June 2026 that Bare would leave following the conclusion of his contract.

=== Volos ===
On 12 August 2026, Bare joined Super League Greece club Volos on a free transfer.

He made his league debut on 23 August, starting in a 2–0 away defeat to OFI Crete on the opening matchday of the 2026–27 season. On 17 October, Bare was sent off in the 28th minute of a 0–0 away draw against Levadiakos, leaving Volos to play with ten men for most of the match.

== International career ==
Bare initially represented the Albania under-17 team under manager Džemal Mustedanagić in the 2014 UEFA European Under-17 Championship qualifying round, appearing in all three group matches in November 2013 as Albania advanced to the elite round. In March 2014, he captained the team in the elite round and scored in a 2–1 defeat to Italy, as Albania was eliminated after losing its remaining two matches. In November 2014, he represented the Albania under-19 team in the 2015 UEFA European Under-19 Championship qualification, as the team was eliminated after losing all three matches.

He subsequently represented the Albania under-21 team in the 2017 UEFA European Under-21 Championship qualification, making his debut in November 2015 and featuring in five other appearances in the campaign as Albania finished fourth in Group 4. While with the under-21 team, Bare received his first call-up to the senior national team from manager Gianni De Biasi for a friendly against Bosnia and Herzegovina on 28 March 2017, but remained an unused substitute. He continued with the under-21 side in the 2019 UEFA European Under-21 Championship qualification, becoming a regular starter, making eight appearances in the ten-match group campaign, playing 712 minutes and missing the other two matches through suspension after receiving two single yellow cards and a second-yellow dismissal in another match.

He made his senior debut on 26 March 2018 under coach Christian Panucci, coming on at half-time in a 1–0 friendly defeat to Norway. In September 2019, Bare returned to the senior team midway through the UEFA Euro 2020 qualifying campaign and established himself as a regular starter under manager Edoardo Reja, who was credited by the Albanian press with giving him the confidence to secure a regular place in midfield. He made six appearances and scored his first international goal in a 4–0 away win over Moldova on 14 October, as Albania finished fourth in Group H. In 2020, Bare made three appearances in the 2020–21 UEFA Nations League C, scoring his second international goal in a 2–0 away win over Belarus on 4 September. He missed Albania's November fixtures, including the final two Nations League matches, due to an injury sustained while playing for Espanyol, as Albania topped Group 4 and secured promotion to League B with successive victories over Kazakhstan (3–1) and Belarus (3–2). Bare remained a regular starter for Albania during the 2022 FIFA World Cup qualifiers, making eight appearances, all as a starter, and providing two assists in back-to-back victories, while Albania remained in contention for a play-off place until the final rounds, finishing third in Group I with 18 points, two behind runners-up Poland.

Under new manager Sylvinho, Bare returned to the national team in June 2023 after missing the previous international break through injury, and made five appearances in the Euro 2024 qualifiers, starting twice, as Albania finished top of the group for the first time, level on 15 points with the Czech Republic but ahead on head-to-head results and secured qualification for UEFA Euro 2024 finals, its second appearance at the European Championship. He featured in a friendly against Sweden on 25 March 2024, coming on as a substitute for the final 18 minutes, but was subsequently omitted from Sylvinho's 27-man preliminary squad for Euro 2024 final stage in Germany.

== Career statistics ==
=== Club ===
As of match played 7 November 2026

Appearances and goals by club, season and competition
Club	Season	League			National cup (Note: Includes Albanian Cup, Copa del Rey)		Other		Total	
Club	Season	Division	Apps	Goals	Apps	Goals	Apps	Goals	Apps	Goals
Apolonia	2013–14	Kategoria e Parë	2	0	1	0	—		3	0
Atlético Madrid B	2015–16	Tercera División	1	0	—		—		1	0
Atlético Madrid B	2016–17	Tercera División	35	2	—		2 (Note: Appearances in Tercera División play-offs)	1	37	3
Atlético Madrid B	2017–18	Segunda División B	30	2	—		—		30	2
Atlético Madrid B	Total		66	4	—		2	1	68	5
Atlético Madrid	2016–17	La Liga	0	0	1	0	—		1	0
Atlético Madrid	2017–18	La Liga	0	0	1	0	—		1	0
Atlético Madrid	Total		0	0	2	0	—		2	0
Málaga B	2018–19	Segunda División B	11	0	—		—		11	0
Málaga	2018–19	Segunda División	16	0	0	0	2 (Note: Appearances in La Liga play-offs)	0	18	0
Málaga	2019–20	Segunda División	30	1	0	0	—		30	1
Málaga	Total		46	1	0	0	2	0	48	1
Espanyol	2020–21	Segunda División	27	0	2	0	—		29	0
Espanyol	2021–22	La Liga	25	1	3	0	—		28	1
Espanyol	2022–23	La Liga	18	0	2	0	—		20	0
Espanyol	2023–24	Segunda División	35	0	3	0	1	0	39	0
Espanyol	Total		105	1	10	0	1	0	116	1
Zaragoza	2024–25	Segunda División	21	0	1	0	—		22	0
Zaragoza	2025–26	Segunda División	25	0	—		—		25	0
Zaragoza	Total		46	0	1	0	—		47	0
Volos	2026–27	Super League Greece	6	0	1	0	—		7	0
Career total			282	6	15	0	5	1	302	7

=== International ===
As of 9 October 2023

Appearances and goals by national team and year
National team	Year	Apps	Goals
Albania	2018	1	0
Albania	2019	6	1
Albania	2020	3	1
Albania	2021	10	0
Albania	2022	3	0
Albania	2023	4	0
Total		27	2

List of international goals scored by Keidi Bare^{Scores and results list Albania's goal tally first, score column indicates score after each Bare goal.}
No.	Date	Venue	Cap	Opponent	Score	Result	Competition
1	14 October 2019	Zimbru Stadium, Chișinău, Moldova	5	Moldova	2–0	4–0	UEFA Euro 2020 qualifying
2	4 September 2020	Dinamo Stadium, Minsk, Belarus	8	Belarus	2–0	2–0	2020–21 UEFA Nations League C

== Honours ==
Espanyol

- Segunda Division: 2020–21
