= Javi Puado =

Spanish association football player

Personal information
- Full name: Javier Puado Díaz
- Date of birth: 25 May 1998 (age 28)
- Place of birth: Barcelona, Spain
- Height: 1.77 m (5 ft 10 in)
- Position: Winger

Team information
- Current team: Espanyol
- Number: 7

Youth career
- 2010–2013: Barcelona
- 2013–2014: Cornellà
- 2014–2017: Espanyol

Senior career*
Years	Team	Apps	(Gls)
2016–2018	Espanyol B	37	(13)
2018–	Espanyol	202	(50)
2019–2020	→ Zaragoza (loan)	21	(4)

International career
2016	Spain U20	6	(0)
2019–2021	Spain U21	10	(3)
2021	Spain U23	3	(0)
2021	Spain	1	(1)
2019–2022	Catalonia	2	(2)
Medal record
Men's football
Representing Spain
Olympic Games
Silver medal – second place	2020 Tokyo	Team
- * Club domestic league appearances and goals as of 21:47, 22 November 2026 (UTC)

Javier Puado Díaz (born 25 May 1998) is a Spanish professional footballer who plays for La Liga club Espanyol. Mainly a right winger, he can also be deployed as a forward.

== Club career ==
Born in Barcelona, Catalonia, Puado joined RCD Espanyol's youth academy in 2014, from UE Cornellà. He made his senior debut with the reserves on 20 August 2016, coming on as a second-half substitute in a 1–1 Segunda División B away draw against UE Llagostera.

On 28 August 2016, in a 0–1 home loss against Valencia CF Mestalla, Puado suffered a knee injury which kept him sidelined for eight months. He returned to action the following 14 May, playing the last 24 minutes and scoring his team's first goal in a 3–2 defeat to CE Sabadell FC, with his side already relegated.

Puado renewed his contract on 21 June 2017, until 2022. The following 28 May, after scoring 12 times and being a key unit in the B side's return to the third tier, he was promoted to the main squad in La Liga.

On 18 August 2018, Puado made his first-team debut by replacing Pablo Piatti in a 1–1 draw at RC Celta de Vigo. He scored his first professional goal on 1 November, the equaliser in a 2–1 away loss against Cádiz CF in the round of 32 of the Copa del Rey.

Puado was loaned to Segunda División club Real Zaragoza on 16 November 2019, as a cover for the injured Raphael Dwamena. Having returned to the RCDE Stadium, he scored 12 goals during the 2020–21 campaign – second best in the squad, only behind Raúl de Tomás' 23 – as Espanyol returned to the top flight after one year out, as champions.

On 23 June 2024, Puado scored a brace in a 2–0 win over Real Oviedo in the second leg of the promotion play-offs finals, securing return to the main division 2–1 on aggregate. In July 2025, having netted 12 times as the team managed to avoid relegation, he agreed to an extension until 2030.

Puado had to be stretchered off in the 73rd minute of a league fixture at Levante UD on 11 January 2026, having taken the field as a substitute himself; he had returned to action that day after recovering from a knee condition. Four days later, an anterior cruciate ligament injury was confirmed and he missed the rest of the season.

== International career ==
On 6 September 2019, Puado earned his first cap for the Spain under-21 team, featuring the first half of a 1–0 victory in Kazakhstan for the 2021 UEFA European Championship qualifiers. Selected by Luis de la Fuente for the finals, he opened a 3–0 win over Slovenia in the group phase, then added a brace in the 2–1 extra time quarter-final defeat of Croatia.

Puado made his debut for the non-FIFA Catalonia national team on 25 March 2019, against Venezuela at the Estadi Montilivi in Girona; he came on as a substitute and scored a late winner in a 2–1 win. He played his first match with the Spanish senior side on 8 June 2021, scoring in a 4–0 friendly victory over Lithuania in Leganés in which ten of the starters were making their first appearance.

== Personal life ==
Puado's father, Francisco, was also a footballer and a forward. He spent the vast majority of his career in the Spanish lower leagues, having a brief spell in the main division with CA Osasuna.

== Career statistics ==
=== Club ===
As of match played on 24 May 2025

Club statistics
Club	Season	League			Copa del Rey		Continental		Other		Total	
Club	Season	Division	Apps	Goals	Apps	Goals	Apps	Goals	Apps	Goals	Apps	Goals
Espanyol B	2016–17	Segunda División B	3	1	—		—		—		3	1
Espanyol B	2017–18	Tercera División	34	12	—		—		2 (Note: Appearances in Tercera División play-offs)	1	36	13
Espanyol B	Total		37	13	—		—		2	1	39	14
Espanyol	2018–19	La Liga	15	0	5	1	—		—		20	1
Espanyol	2019–20	La Liga	0	0	0	0	3 (Note: Appearances in UEFA Europa League)	0	—		3	0
Espanyol	2020–21	Segunda División	37	12	2	1	—		—		39	13
Espanyol	2021–22	La Liga	30	4	3	1	—		—		33	5
Espanyol	2022–23	La Liga	37	7	4	2	—		—		41	9
Espanyol	2023–24	Segunda División	34	13	2	1	—		4 (Note: Appearances in Segunda División play-offs)	3	36	14
Espanyol	2024–25	La Liga	35	12	0	0	—		—		35	12
Espanyol	Total		188	48	16	6	3	0	4	3	211	57
Zaragoza (loan)	2019–20	Segunda División	21	4	1	1	—		—		22	5
Career totals			246	65	17	7	3	0	6	4	272	76

=== International ===
As of match played 8 June 2021

Appearances and goals by national team and year
National team	Year	Apps	Goals
Spain	2021	1	1
Total		1	1

As of match played 8 June 2021
Spain score listed first, score column indicates score after each Puado goal.

List of international goals scored by Javi Puado
No.	Date	Venue	Opponent	Score	Result	Competition
1	8 June 2021	Estadio Municipal de Butarque, Leganés, Spain	Lithuania	4–0	4–0	Friendly

== Honours ==
Espanyol

- Segunda División: 2020–21

Spain U23

- Summer Olympics silver medal: 2020

Individual

- La Liga Goal of the Month: January 2025
- UEFA European Under-21 Championship Team of the Tournament: 2021
