= Jofre Carreras =

Spanish footballer

Personal information
- Full name: Jofre Carreras Pagès
- Date of birth: 17 June 2001 (age 25)
- Place of birth: Girona, Spain
- Height: 1.73 m (5 ft 8 in)
- Position: Winger

Team information
- Current team: Espanyol
- Number: 17

Youth career
- GEiEG
- Girona
- 2014–2020: Espanyol

Senior career*
| Years | Team | Apps | (Gls) |
| 2019–2022 | Espanyol B | 30 | (5) |
| 2020– | Espanyol | 104 | (7) |
| 2022–2023 | → Mirandés (loan) | 27 | (1) |

International career
| 2025– | Catalonia | 1 | (0) |
- * Club domestic league appearances and goals as of 27 May 2026

Jofre Carreras Pagès (born 17 June 2001) is a Spanish professional footballer who plays as a right winger for RCD Espanyol.

== Club career ==
Born in Girona, Catalonia, Carreras joined RCD Espanyol's youth setup in 2014, after representing Girona FC and Grup Excursionista i Esportiu Gironí. He made his senior debut with the reserves on 10 February 2019, coming on as a second-half substitute for Carlos Doncel in a 0–1 Segunda División B home loss against CD Alcoyano.

Carreras renewed his contract with the Pericos on 28 February 2020, signing until 2024. He made his professional debut on 27 September, replacing Fran Mérida in a 2–0 away win against Real Oviedo in the Segunda División.

Carreras made his La Liga debut on 31 December 2021, replacing Aleix Vidal late into a 2–1 away win over Valencia CF. The following 14 August, he further extended his contract until 2026, and was loaned to CD Mirandés in the second division, for one year.

Carreras scored his first professional goal on 12 March 2023, netting his team's second in a 4–3 away win over Sporting de Gijón.

== Career statistics ==
As of match played 23 June 2024

Appearances and goals by club, season and competition
| Club | Season | League | | | Cup | | Other | | Total | |
| Club | Season | Division | Apps | Goals | Apps | Goals | Apps | Goals | Apps | Goals |
|---|---|---|---|---|---|---|---|---|---|---|
| Espanyol B | 2018–19 | Segunda División B | 1 | 0 | — | | — | | 1 | 0 |
| Espanyol B | 2021–22 | Segunda División B | 3 | 0 | — | | — | | 3 | 0 |
| Espanyol B | 2020–21 | Segunda División B | 8 | 2 | — | | — | | 8 | 2 |
| Espanyol B | 2021–22 | Segunda División RFEF | 18 | 3 | — | | — | | 18 | 3 |
| Espanyol B | Total | | 30 | 5 | — | | — | | 30 | 5 |
| Espanyol | 2020–21 | Segunda División | 3 | 0 | 2 | 0 | — | | 5 | 0 |
| Espanyol | 2021–22 | La Liga | 3 | 0 | 1 | 0 | — | | 4 | 0 |
| Espanyol | 2023–24 | Segunda División | 35 | 3 | 3 | 2 | 4 | 0 | 42 | 5 |
| Espanyol | 2024–25 | La Liga | 37 | 3 | 1 | 0 | — | | 38 | 3 |
| Espanyol | 2025–26 | La Liga | 26 | 1 | 1 | 0 | — | | 27 | 1 |
| Espanyol | Total | | 106 | 7 | 8 | 2 | 4 | 0 | 118 | 9 |
| Mirandés (loan) | 2022–23 | Segunda División | 27 | 1 | 1 | 0 | — | | 28 | 1 |
| Career total | | | 163 | 13 | 9 | 2 | 4 | 0 | 176 | 15 |
