= Max Svensson (footballer, born 2001) =

Spanish footballer

Personal information
- Full name: Max Svensson Río
- Date of birth: 8 November 2001 (age 25)
- Place of birth: Barcelona, Spain
- Height: 1.82 m (6 ft 0 in)
- Position: Forward

Team information
- Current team: Penafiel
- Number: 9

Youth career
- Barcelona
- Gavà
- Cornellà
- 2018–2020: Espanyol

Senior career*
Years	Team	Apps	(Gls)
2020–2022	Espanyol B	58	(12)
2020–2024	Espanyol	2	(0)
2022–2023	→ Deportivo La Coruña (loan)	27	(4)
2023–2024	→ Osasuna B (loan)	34	(9)
2024	→ Osasuna (loan)	1	(0)
2024–2026	Casa Pia	30	(1)
2026	→ Ibiza (loan)	19	(3)
2026–	Penafiel	6	(4)
- * Club domestic league appearances and goals as of 12 September 2026

Max Svensson Río (born 8 November 2001) is a Spanish professional footballer who plays as a forward for Liga Portugal 2 club Penafiel.

== Career ==
Born in Barcelona, Catalonia, Svensson moved to Hamburg with six months of age. He returned to Spain in 2005 and lived in Pamplona and Valladolid before establishing himself in his hometown in 2012. He represented FC Barcelona, CF Gavà and UE Cornellà before joining RCD Espanyol's youth setup in 2018.

Promoted to the reserves for the 2020–21 campaign, Svensson made his senior debut on 18 October 2020, coming on as a second-half substitute for Jofre Carreras in a 2–1 Segunda División B home win against AE Prat. He scored his first senior goals six days later, netting a brace in a 2–2 draw at FC Andorra.

Svensson made his first team debut on 16 December 2020, replacing Wu Lei in a 1–0 away success over UE Llagostera, for the season's Copa del Rey. His Segunda División debut occurred the following 31 January, coming on for fellow youth graduate Nico Melamed late into a 3–2 home loss against Rayo Vallecano.

On 1 September 2022, Svensson was loaned to Primera Federación side Deportivo de La Coruña, for one year. On 15 August of the following year, he moved to fellow league team CA Osasuna B also in a temporary deal.

Svensson made his first team – and La Liga – debut for CA Osasuna on 14 May 2024, replacing Raúl García late into a 1–1 home draw against RCD Mallorca. On 1 July, he returned to the Pericos, but was announced at Portuguese Primeira Liga side Casa Pia AC on a three-year deal on 7 August.

On 9 January 2026, after a season-and-a-half in Portugal, Svensson was sent on loan to Primera Federación club UD Ibiza until the end of the 2025–26 campaign.

== Personal life ==
Svensson is the son of Swedish handball goalkeeper Tomas Svensson. Maja Åskag is his cousin.
