= Íñigo Piña =

Spanish footballer

Piña
Personal information
- Full name: Íñigo Sebastián Magaña
- Date of birth: 30 October 1994 (age 32)
- Place of birth: Murchante, Spain
- Height: 1.88 m (6 ft 2 in)
- Position: Centre-back

Team information
- Current team: Iraklis
- Number: 21

Youth career
- Murchante
- 2011–2013: Tudelano

Senior career*
Years	Team	Apps	(Gls)
2013–2014	Tudelano	14	(0)
2014–2015	Osasuna B	5	(0)
2015	→ Mutilvera (loan)	10	(0)
2015–2016	Barco	15	(0)
2016–2017	Formentera	48	(1)
2017–2019	Arandina	70	(0)
2019–2022	Zamora	63	(5)
2022	Unionistas	18	(2)
2022–2023	Murcia	36	(0)
2023–2025	Eldense	59	(1)
2025–2026	Huesca	34	(0)
2026–	Iraklis	5	(0)
- * Club domestic league appearances and goals as of 19 September 2026

Íñigo Sebastián Magaña (born 30 October 1994), known as Íñigo Piña or just Piña, is a Spanish professional footballer who plays as a centre-back for Super League Greece club Iraklis.

== Career ==
Born in Murchante, Navarre, Piña joined CD Tudelano's youth setup in 2011, from hometown side Murchante FC. He made his first team debut on 13 October 2013, starting in a 1–0 Segunda División B away loss against CD Toledo.

On 4 July 2014, Piña moved to CA Osasuna and was assigned to the reserves in Tercera División. The following 31 January, after being rarely used, he moved to fellow fourth tier side UD Mutilvera on loan.

In September 2015, Piña signed for CD Barco also in division four. On 27 January of the following year, he agreed to a deal with SD Formentera in the same division, and became a regular starter for the side.

In June 2017, Piña joined Arandina CF still in the fourth tier. On 17 July 2019, he moved to fellow league team Zamora CF, and helped in their promotion to the third level in his first season.

On 21 January 2022, Piña signed a six-month contract with Primera División RFEF side Unionistas de Salamanca CF. On 4 July, he joined fellow league team Real Murcia.

On 18 July 2023, Piña agreed to a one-year deal with CD Eldense, newly-promoted to Segunda División. He made his professional debut at the age of 28 on 13 August, starting in a 1–0 away win over FC Cartagena.

Piña scored his first professional goal on 8 March 2025, netting the equalizer in a 4–2 away win over Real Zaragoza. On 7 July, after suffering relegation, he moved to SD Huesca also in the second division on a two-year contract.

On 7 July 2026, Piña signed for Greek club Iraklis on a free transfer.
