= Murchante =

Municipality in Spain

Coordinates: 42°02′N 1°39′W

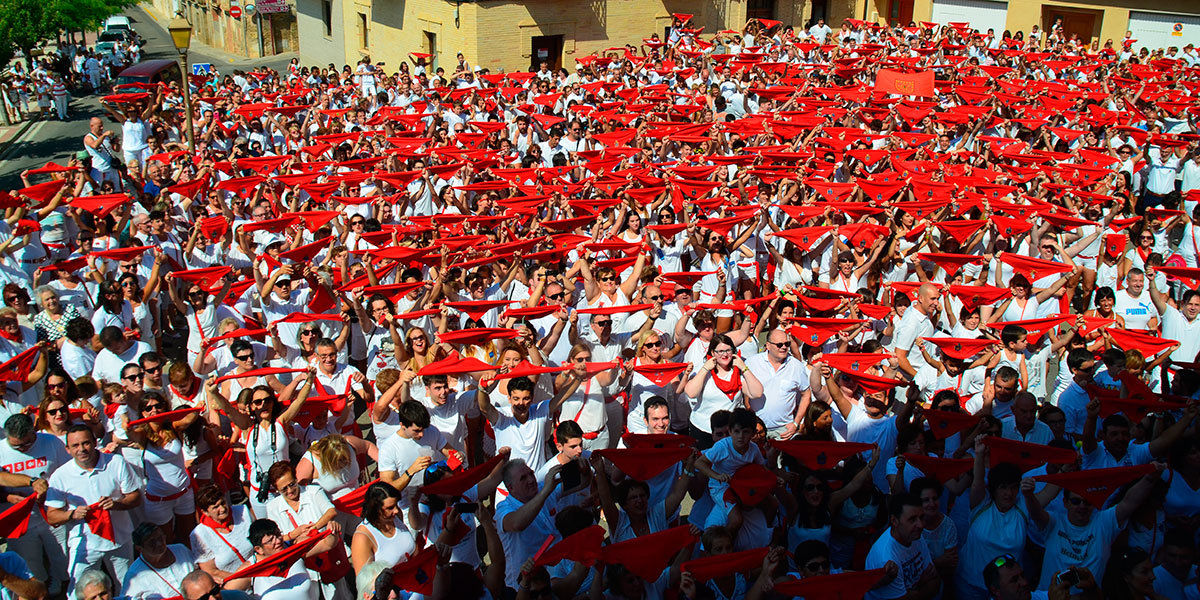
Image of Murchante's party chupinazo in 2017

Murchante is a town and municipality located in the province and autonomous community of Navarre, northern Spain.
