= Albert Forns i Canal =

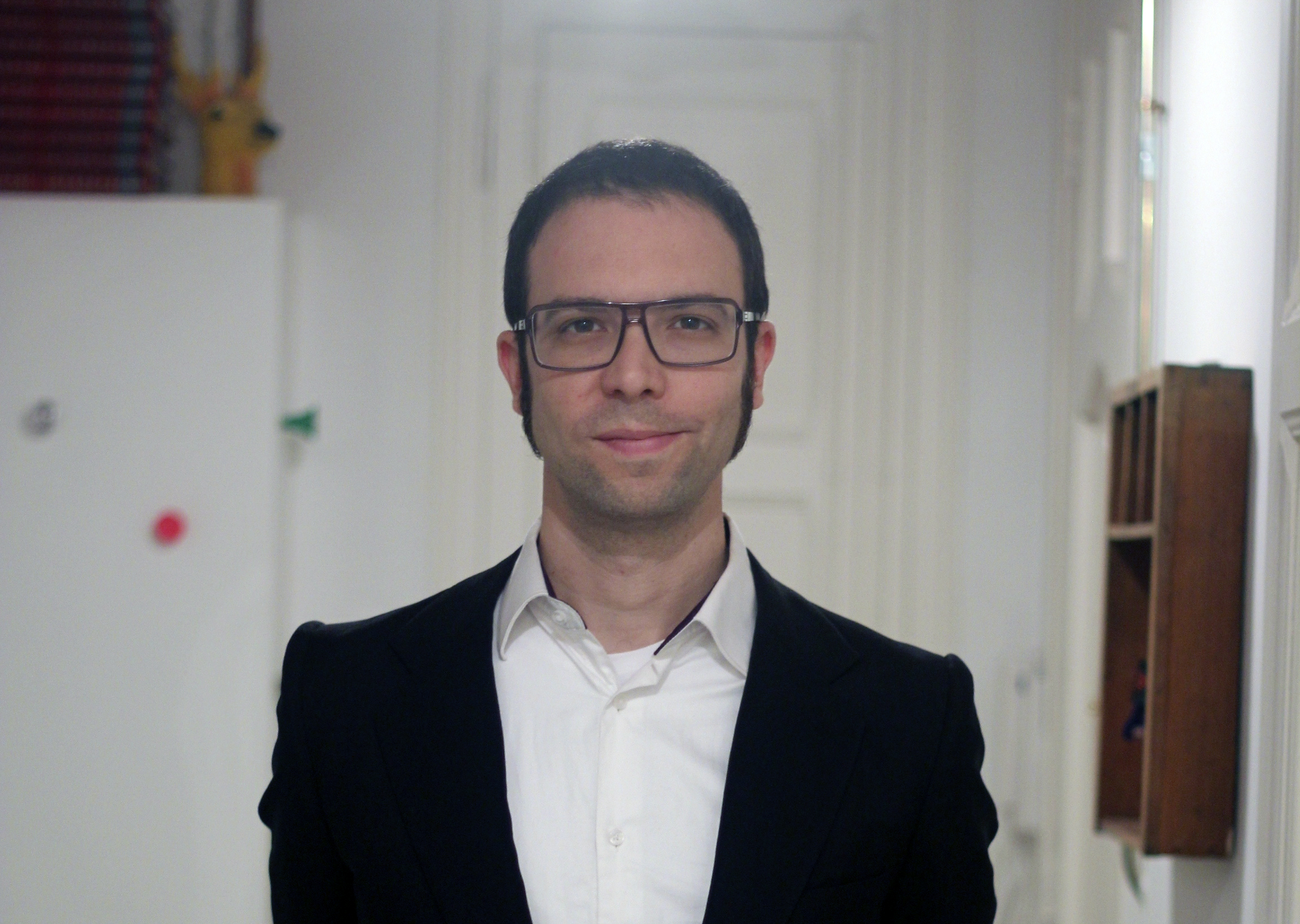
- Born: 8 April 1982 (age 44); Granollers, Spain
- Occupation: writer
- Notable work: Albert Serra (the novel, not the film-maker)

Albert Forns i Canal (born 8 April 1982 in Granollers) is a journalist, writer and poet from Catalan. Specialised in digital journalism, has worked in cultural institutions like the Centre of Contemporary Culture of Barcelona. Forns stands out for having won the Documenta Prize of narrative with his first novel Albert Serra (the novel, not the film-maker), where the author questions some appearances of the contemporary art mixing fiction, journalism and essay, and where also appear other Catalan artists out like Miquel Barceló or Salvador Dalí, and other writers like Enrique Vila-Matas The autumn of 2013 Forns received a scholarship from the Institut Ramon Llull to stay at a writers' residence in the State of New York, to prepare his second novel, Jambalaia, rewarded with First Anagrama Prize for Novels in Catalan language. In 2020 he won the Sant Joan Award for his forthcoming novel Abans de les cinc som a casa.

== Works published ==
- 2007 - Busco L que me gemini (poem)
- 2013 - Ultracolors (poems)
- 2013 - Albert Serra (la novel·la, no el cineasta) (novel)
- 2016 - Jambalaia (novel, Anagrama)

== Awards ==
- 2006 - Nostra senyora del Carme de poesia of the Vallès Oriental
- 2009 - Pere Badia of poetry of Torredembarra
- 2012 - Documenta Award by Albert Serra (the novel, not the film-maker)
- 2016 - First Anagrama Prize for Catalan language novels for Jambalaia
- 2020 - Premi Sant Joan de Narrativa (Abans de les cinc som a casa)
