= Joan Garcia =

Spanish footballer (born 2001)

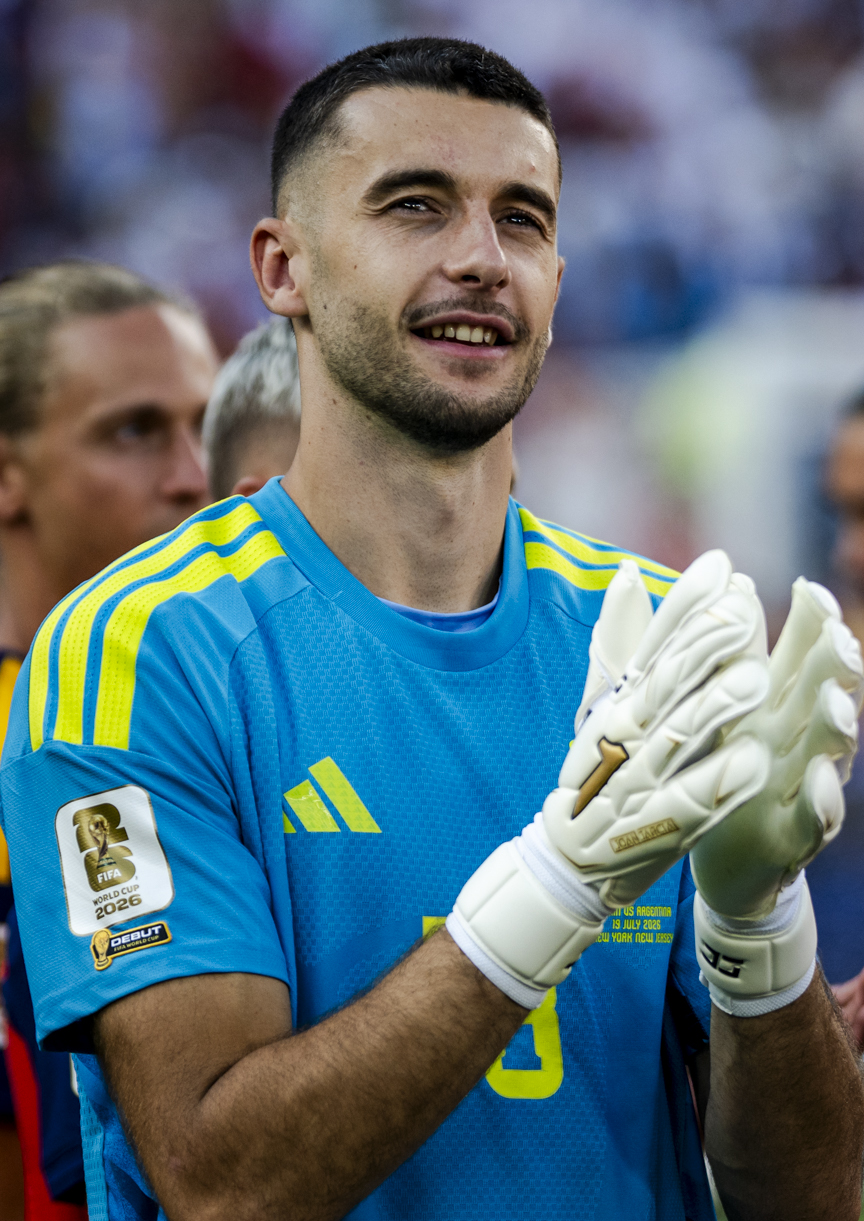
- Garcia with Spain in 2026

Personal information
- Full name: Joan Garcia Pons
- Date of birth: 4 May 2001 (age 25)
- Place of birth: Sallent, Spain
- Height: 1.93 m (6 ft 4 in)
- Position: Goalkeeper

Team information
- Current team: Barcelona
- Number: 1

Youth career
- 2005–2009: Sallent
- 2009–2012: Manresa
- 2012–2016: Damm
- 2016–2020: Espanyol

Senior career*
Years	Team	Apps	(Gls)
2019–2021	Espanyol B	17	(0)
2021–2025	Espanyol	55	(0)
2025–	Barcelona	42	(0)

International career^{‡}
2018	Spain U17	2	(0)
2018–2019	Spain U18	4	(0)
2019	Spain U19	2	(0)
2021–2022	Spain U21	2	(0)
2025–	Catalonia	1	(0)
2026–	Spain	2	(0)
Medal record
Men's football
Representing Spain
FIFA World Cup
Winner	2026 Canada–Mexico–US
Olympic Games
Gold medal – first place	2024 Paris	Team
- * Club domestic league appearances and goals as of 22 November 2026 ‡ National team caps and goals as of 31 March 2026

Joan Garcia Pons (Catalan: [ʒuˈaŋ ɡəɾˈsiə]; born 4 May 2001) is a Spanish professional footballer who plays as a goalkeeper for La Liga club Barcelona and the Spain national team.

An Espanyol youth graduate, Garcia broke into the first team in 2021 and eventually established himself as a first-choice in 2024. In June 2025, he moved to Barcelona after the club activated his release clause. He immediately broke into the starting line-up, and helped his club win the La Liga title.

Garcia is a Spain international and former youth international. He made his debut for the senior national team in 2026, and was a part of the squad that won the 2026 FIFA World Cup.

== Club career ==
=== Espanyol ===
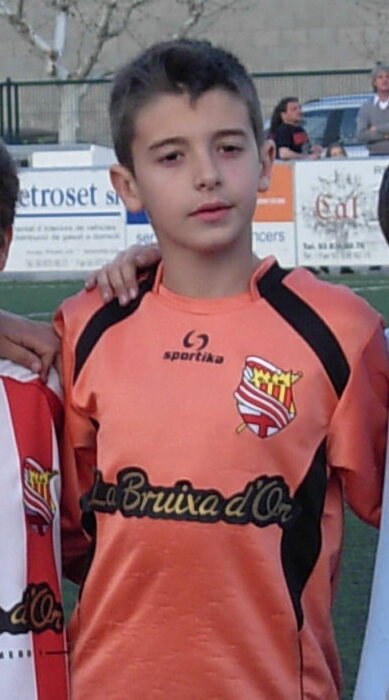
Garcia in 2012

Born in Sallent, Barcelona, Catalonia, Garcia began his career with his hometown side CE Sallent at the age of four; initially an outfield player, he was influenced by his older brother to move to goal. He subsequently represented Manresa and Damm before joining the youth sides of Espanyol in 2016, aged 15.

==== Beginnings and debut ====
Garcia made his senior debut with the reserves on 28 September 2019, starting in a 1–1 Segunda División B away draw against Valencia Mestalla. On 11 February 2020, he renewed with the Pericos until 2025.

Garcia made his first-team debut on 1 December 2021, starting in a 3–2 away win over Solares-Medio Cudeyo in the season's Copa del Rey. He made his professional – and La Liga – debut on 10 January 2022, starting in a 1–2 home loss against Elche.

==== 2022–2024: First team and breakthrough ====
After goalkeeper Oier Olazábal departed the club on 29 June 2022, Garcia was handed the number one shirt in the 2022–23 campaign, moving from his previous number 34. Over the season, he served as a back-up in La Liga, featuring in three Copa del Rey matches. On 4 June 2023, the final day of the league campaign, Garcia started in a 3–3 La Liga home draw against Almería, although Espanyol had been relegated to the Second Division before the game. He ended the season with 4 appearances and 1 clean sheet.

On 16 November 2023, Espanyol announced that the club and Garcia had reached an agreement to extend his contract until 30 June 2028. In March 2024, he became the first-choice goalkeeper for the Pericos in the Second Division. Garcia finished the 2023–24 campaign with 21 appearances and 12 clean sheets, helping Espanyol secure promotion back to La Liga via the play-offs. After winning the club's Player of the Month award in three consecutive months from March to May 2024, Garcia was voted by Espanyol supporters as the club's Male Player of the Season.

==== 2024–2025: First-choice status and La Liga ====
Garcia continued as a starter in La Liga matches during the 2024–25 campaign. On 28 August 2024, he made seven saves to keep his first La Liga clean sheet in a 0–0 away draw against Atlético Madrid. Three days later, he helped Espanyol record their first La Liga victory of the campaign, a 2–1 home win against Rayo Vallecano. On 21 September, Garcia made ten saves but it was not enough, as his side were defeated 4–1 by Real Madrid at the Santiago Bernabéu Stadium. In an away game against Real Betis on 29 September, he produced ten saves again, including a penalty stop, but could not prevent a third consecutive loss for the Pericos.

On 3 November, Garcia played in his first Barcelona derby and made six saves, as Espanyol were beaten 3–1 by their local rivals Barcelona at the Barcelona Olympic Stadium. In another Catalan derby on 23 November, he could not stop Girona from scoring four goals in the first 30 minutes, and the Pericos ultimately lost 4–1 at the Estadi Montilivi. On 14 December, Garcia recorded his first La Liga clean sheet at home without making a save in a goalless draw against Osasuna. After suffering their eleventh defeat in eighteen league encounters this season, Espanyol headed into the winter break in eighteenth place in La Liga, just three points off the bottom of the table.

On 1 February 2025, Garcia produced a man of the match display with seven saves, helping Espanyol beat league leaders Real Madrid 1–0 at the RCDE Stadium, and recording his third clean sheet of the campaign. In an away game against Real Sociedad on 9 February, he made a foot save to deny Luka Sučić, which would later win the La Liga Save of the Month award for February. In a 1–0 victory at Alavés on 22 February, Garcia produced four saves, helping the Pericos end their long wait for a first La Liga away win of the season.

On 10 March, Garcia made a crucial stop to keep out Yangel Herrera's first-time volley in a home match against Girona that earned him the second La Liga Save of the Month award for March. By achieving the honour, he became the first player to have won the award in consecutive months. In an away game against Mallorca on 15 March, Garcia saved two penalty kicks from Vedat Muriqi and Abdón Prats, but the latter's was retaken after VAR deemed that an Espanyol player had entered the box prematurely, and Mallorca ultimately won 2–1 by beating Garcia from the penalty spot on the third attempt. On 4 April, Garcia kept his fifth clean sheet of the season with five saves in a 4–0 away triumph over Rayo Vallecano. By the end of the 2024–25 La Liga season, Garcia recorded the highest number of saves among all goalkeepers in the league.

=== Barcelona ===
On 18 June 2025, Espanyol announced the player's departure after activating his €25 million plus taxes release clause. Subsequently, Barcelona announced his signing on a six-year contract until 2031.

On 16 August, Garcia made his Barça debut in which he started in a 3–0 win against Mallorca. On 31 August, in just his third start for Barcelona, a 1–1 draw against Rayo Vallecano, Garcia made 5 crucial saves, including a notable cutback save from Rayo player Andrei Rațiu. Though Rayo eventually equalized through Fran Pérez, Garcia was praised by Barcelona fans for his saves and earned his first MVP of the Match for Barcelona. On 18 September, Garcia made his UEFA Champions League debut for Barcelona in a 2–1 win over Newcastle United, starting in goal, and playing the full 90 minutes. Eight days later on 26 September, after featuring for the entire 90 minutes in Barcelona's 3–1 win over Real Oviedo in La Liga, Garcia was diagonsed with a meniscus tear in his left knee. He subsequently underwent surgery, and was given a recovery time of four to six weeks. Garcia returned from injury on 22 November, coinciding with Barcelona's return to the Camp Nou, starting in the club’s 4–0 La Liga win over Athletic Club following his recovery from knee surgery.

On 3 January 2026, Garcia faced his former club, Espanyol. Prior to the match, reports suggested that the fixture could present a hostile atmosphere for Garcia, leading the club to implement additional security measures to ensure his safety. The game ended in an 2–0 victory for Barcelona with Garcia playing a crucial part by making 6 saves, which led to him winning his second La Liga MVP of the Match award for Barcelona while also getting praised by manager Hansi Flick. During the season, Garcia became Barcelona's first-choice goalkeeper after regular starter Marc-André ter Stegen joined Girona on loan. Garcia helped the club win La Liga by keeping a clean sheet in a 2–0 victory over rivals Real Madrid in El Clásico, securing Barcelona's 29th La Liga title.

== International career ==
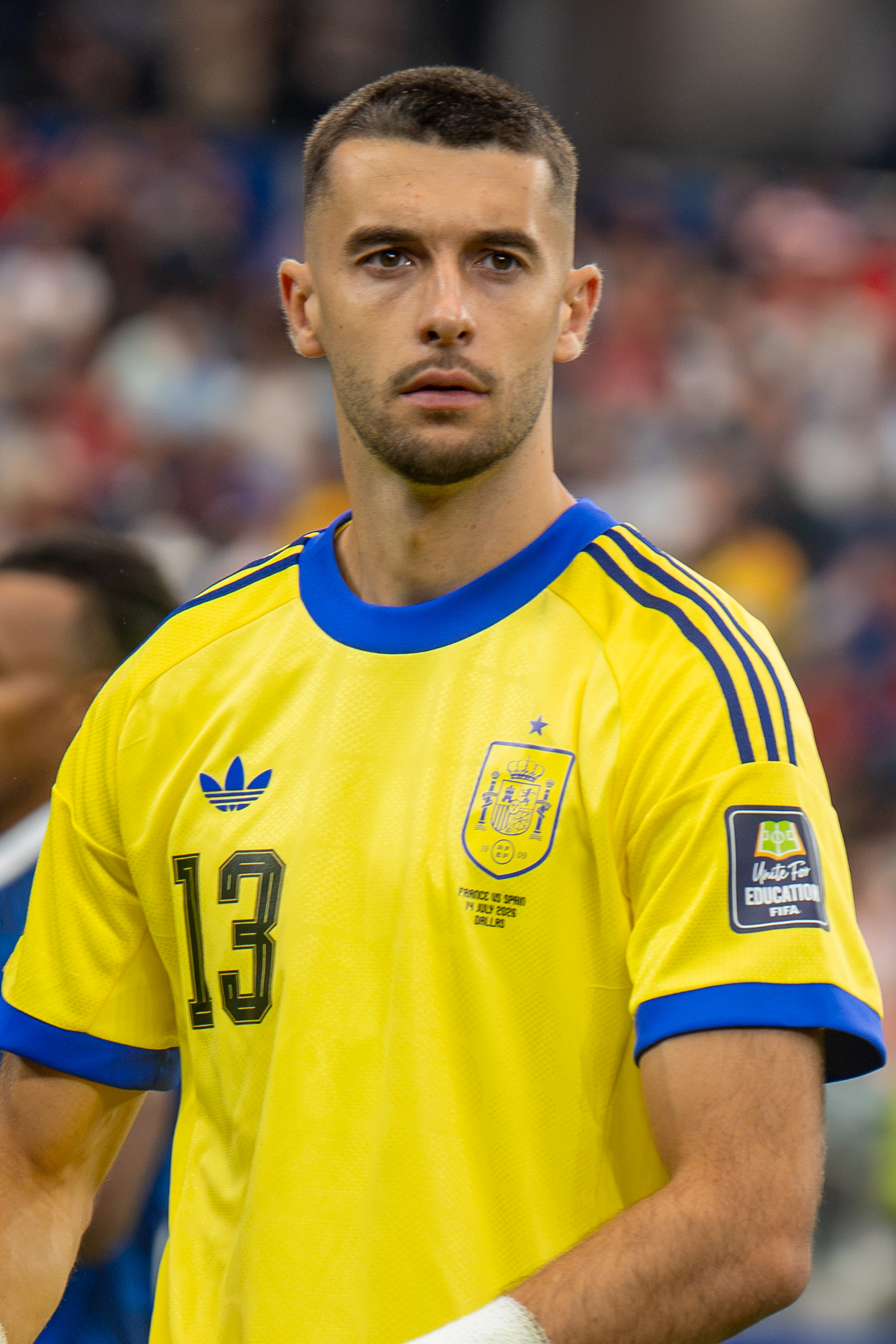
Garcia with Spain in 2026

Garcia is a former youth international for Spain, having represented the Spain U17s, U18, U19s, and U21s. In July 2024, he was selected in the Spain under-23 squad for the 2024 Summer Olympics. He and Spain would go on to win the Olympic gold medal at the men's football event in the Olympics.

On 31 March 2026, Garcia made his senior debut for Spain in an international friendly against Egypt at the RCDE Stadium, coming off the bench for David Raya in the 62nd minute of a goalless draw. He was included in Luis de la Fuente's 26-man squad for the 2026 FIFA World Cup on 25 May, and made his first start for the nation on 4 June in a friendly draw against Iraq. Garcia remained an unused substitute as Spain went on to lift the World Cup for a second time on 19 July.

== Career statistics ==
=== Club ===
As of match played 22 November 2026

Appearances and goals by club, season and competition
Club	Season	League			Copa del Rey		Europe		Other		Total	
Club	Season	Division	Apps	Goals	Apps	Goals	Apps	Goals	Apps	Goals	Apps	Goals
Espanyol B	2019–20	Segunda División B	2	0	—		—		—		2	0
Espanyol B	2020–21	Segunda División B	15	0	—		—		—		15	0
Espanyol B	Total		17	0	—		—		—		17	0
Espanyol	2021–22	La Liga	2	0	2	0	—		—		4	0
Espanyol	2022–23	La Liga	1	0	3	0	—		—		4	0
Espanyol	2023–24	Segunda División	14	0	3	0	—		4 (Note: Appearances in Segunda División play-offs)	0	21	0
Espanyol	2024–25	La Liga	38	0	0	0	—		—		38	0
Espanyol	Total		55	0	8	0	—		4	0	67	0
Barcelona	2025–26	La Liga	30	0	4	0	9 (Note: Appearances in UEFA Champions League)	0	2 (Note: Appearances in Supercopa de España)	0	45	0
Barcelona	2026–27	La Liga	12	0	0	0	4	0	0	0	16	0
Barcelona	Total		42	0	4	0	13	0	2	0	61	0
Career total			114	0	12	0	13	0	6	0	145	0

=== International ===
As of match played 31 March 2026

Appearances and goals by national team and year
National team	Year	Apps	Goals
Spain	2026	2	0
Total		2	0

== Honours ==
Barcelona

- La Liga: 2025–26
- Supercopa de España: 2026

Spain U23

- Summer Olympics gold medal: 2024

Spain

- FIFA World Cup: 2026

Individual

- Espanyol Male Player of the Season: 2023–24
- La Liga Team of the Season: 2024–25, 2025–26
- La Liga Zamora Trophy: 2025–26
- La Liga Save of the Month: February 2025, March 2025, August 2025, January 2026
- La Liga Save of the Season: 2025–26
