= Miguelón (footballer) =

Spanish footballer

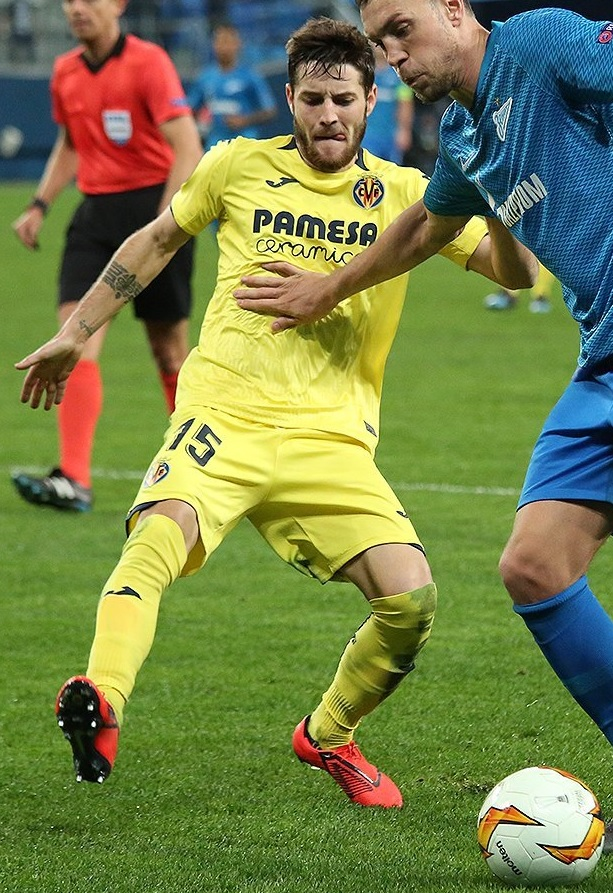
- Miguelón with Villarreal in 2019

Personal information
- Full name: Miguel Juan Llambrich
- Date of birth: 18 January 1996 (age 30)
- Place of birth: Benidorm, Spain
- Height: 1.70 m (5 ft 7 in)
- Position: Right back

Team information
- Current team: Torrent
- Number: 2

Youth career
- 2000–2003: Benidorm
- 2003–2006: Alicante
- 2006–2015: Villarreal

Senior career*
Years	Team	Apps	(Gls)
2015–2016	Villarreal C	25	(0)
2015–2018	Villarreal B	52	(1)
2015–2021	Villarreal	8	(0)
2019–2020	→ Huesca (loan)	26	(2)
2020–2021	→ Espanyol (loan)	19	(0)
2021–2023	Espanyol	2	(0)
2022	→ Oviedo (loan)	4	(0)
2023	→ Cartagena (loan)	2	(0)
2023–2024	Eldense	2	(0)
2025–	Torrent	31	(1)
- * Club domestic league appearances and goals as of 15 May 2026

Miguel Juan Llambrich (born 18 January 1996), commonly known as Miguelón, is a Spanish professional footballer who plays as a right back for Segunda Federación club Torrent.

== Club career ==
Born in Benidorm, Alicante, Valencian Community, Miguelón joined Villarreal CF's youth setup in 2006, after stints at Benidorm CF and Alicante CF. He made his senior debut with the C-team on 22 August 2015, starting in a 1–1 away draw against UD Alzira.

On 28 November 2015, Miguelón played the full 90 minutes with the reserves in a 3–2 home win against CD Eldense, after both Felipe Alfonso and Edgar Ié were unavailable due to injury. On 3 December he made his first team debut, starting in a 2–3 Copa del Rey away loss against SD Huesca.

Miguelón was definitely promoted to the main squad on 2 August 2018. On 11 July 2019, after being rarely used, he was loaned to Huesca for one year.

On 25 August 2020, after achieving promotion with Huesca, Miguelón was loaned to fellow second division side RCD Espanyol for one year. He also promoted to the top tier with the latter side, signing a permanent deal with them on 2 June 2021.

On 11 July 2022, Miguelón was loaned to second division side Real Oviedo for the season. The following 5 January, he moved to fellow league team FC Cartagena also in a temporary deal.

On 14 August 2023, Miguelón terminated his contract with the Pericos, and signed a one-year deal with CD Eldense in the second division on 1 September.

== Career statistics ==
=== Club ===
As of match played 14 February 2021

Appearances and goals by club, season and competition
Club	Season	League			National Cup		Continental		Other		Total	
Club	Season	Division	Apps	Goals	Apps	Goals	Apps	Goals	Apps	Goals	Apps	Goals
Villarreal B	2015–16	Segunda División B	11	0	0	0	—		—		11	0
Villarreal B	2016–17	Segunda División B	12	0	0	0	—		—		12	1
Villarreal B	2017–18	Segunda División B	29	1	0	0	—		3 (Note: Appearance(s) in Promotion Playoffs)	0	32	0
Villarreal B	Total		52	0	0	0	0	0	3	0	55	1
Villarreal	2015–16	La Liga	0	0	1	0	—		—		1	0
Villarreal	2018–19	La Liga	8	0	3	0	5 (Note: Appearance(s) in UEFA Europa League)	0	—		16	0
Villarreal	Total		8	0	4	0	0	0	0	0	17	0
Huesca (loan)	2019–20	Segunda División	26	2	2	0	—		—		28	2
Espanyol (loan)	2020–21	Segunda División	19	0	2	0	—		—		21	0
Espanyol	2021–22	La Liga	0	0	0	0	—		—		0	0
Career total			105	3	8	0	0	0	3	0	121	3
