= Ian Forns =

Spanish footballer (born 2004)

Personal information
- Full name: Ian Forns Montes
- Date of birth: 5 February 2004 (age 22)
- Place of birth: Cardedeu, Spain
- Position: Left-back

Team information
- Current team: Betis Deportivo
- Number: 28

Youth career
- Cardedeu
- Granollers
- 2016–2023: Espanyol

Senior career*
| Years | Team | Apps | (Gls) |
| 2022–2024 | Espanyol B | 26 | (4) |
| 2024–2025 | Espanyol | 2 | (0) |
| 2024–2025 | → Burgos (loan) | 5 | (0) |
| 2025 | → Murcia (loan) | 10 | (1) |
| 2025– | Betis Deportivo | 25 | (0) |
- * Club domestic league appearances and goals as of 10 June 2026

Ian Forns Montes (born 5 February 2004) is a Spanish professional footballer who plays as a left-back for Primera Federación side Betis Deportivo.

== Career ==
Born in Cardedeu, Barcelona, Catalonia, Forns joined RCD Espanyol's youth sides in 2016, after representing EC Granollers and FC Cardedeu. He made his senior debut with the reserves on 4 December 2022, coming on as a second-half substitute in a 1–0 Segunda Federación away win over SCR Peña Deportiva.

Forns scored his first senior goal on 11 December 2022, netting the B's winner in a 1–0 home success over SD Formentera. The following 13 June, he renewed his contract until 2027.

Forns made his first team debut on 6 January 2024, starting in a 1–0 home loss to Getafe CF, for the season's Copa del Rey. On 28 August, he renewed his contract until 2028 and was loaned to Burgos CF for one year.

On 15 January 2025, Forns' loan with Burgos was cut short. On the same day, Forns moved on a new loan to Murcia.
