= Carlos Doncel =

Spanish footballer

Personal information
- Full name: Carlos Doncel Ordóñez
- Date of birth: 4 December 1996 (age 29)
- Place of birth: Cabrera de Mar, Spain
- Height: 1.69 m (5 ft 7 in)
- Position: Winger

Team information
- Current team: Mérida
- Number: 10

Youth career
- Damm

Senior career*
Years	Team	Apps	(Gls)
2015–2016	Lleida B	19	(6)
2015–2017	Lleida Esportiu	43	(3)
2017–2019	Espanyol B	69	(15)
2019–2021	Valladolid B	28	(6)
2020–2021	→ Ponferradina (loan)	36	(1)
2021–2022	Deportivo La Coruña	20	(1)
2022–2023	UD Logroñés	38	(4)
2023–2024	Ceuta	28	(2)
2024–	Mérida	63	(11)
- * Club domestic league appearances and goals as of 9 June 2026

Carlos Doncel Ordóñez (born 4 December 1996) is a Spanish professional footballer who plays as a left winger for Mérida.

== Club career ==
Born in Cabrera de Mar, Barcelona, Catalonia, Doncel finished his formation with CF Damm. On 2 July 2015, he joined Segunda División B side Lleida Esportiu, being initially assigned to the reserves in Primera Catalana.

On 21 August 2017, Doncel signed for RCD Espanyol B in Tercera División. On 2 July 2019, he moved to another reserve team, Real Valladolid Promesas in the third division after agreeing to a three-year contract.

On 22 August 2020, Doncel was loaned to SD Ponferradina of Segunda División for the 2020–21 season. He made his professional debut on 12 September, starting and scoring his team's only in a 1–2 home loss against CD Castellón for the second division championship.

On 7 August 2021, Doncel cut ties with Valladolid, and signed a two-year contract with Primera División RFEF side Deportivo de La Coruña six days later.
