= Carlos Pomares =

Spanish footballer

Personal information
- Full name: Carlos Pomares Rayo
- Date of birth: 5 December 1992 (age 33)
- Place of birth: Valencia, Spain
- Height: 1.82 m (6 ft 0 in)
- Position: Left-back

Youth career
- Malvarrosa
- Alboraya
- 2009–2012: Sheffield United

Senior career*
Years	Team	Apps	(Gls)
2012–2014	Huracán	31	(0)
2014–2015	Levante B	35	(4)
2015–2016	Barakaldo	32	(1)
2016–2018	Lorca	74	(2)
2018–2019	Extremadura	30	(1)
2019–2020	Alcorcón	26	(2)
2020–2022	Tenerife	54	(3)
2022–2025	Oviedo	56	(0)
2025–2026	Zaragoza	17	(0)
- * Club domestic league appearances and goals as of 31 May 2026

Carlos Pomares Rayo (born 5 December 1992) is a Spanish professional footballer who plays as a left back.

== Career ==
Born in Valencia, Pomares left Alboraya UD in June 2009 after agreeing to a three-year deal with Sheffield United. After failing to make the breakthrough to the first team, he returned to his home country on 16 August 2012 after signing for Segunda División B side Huracán Valencia CF.

Pomares only made his senior debut on 4 January 2013, coming on as a late substitute for José Luis Capdevila in a 2–1 home win against CF Badalona. He scored his first goal on 1 June, netting the second in a 3–0 home win against Lucena CF which ensured his team's qualification to the following round of the play-offs.

On 5 June 2014 Pomares moved to Levante UD, being assigned to the reserves in Tercera División. On 17 July of the following year he joined third-tier club Barakaldo CF, and was an ever-present figure during the season.

On 16 July 2016, Pomares signed with fellow third-division side Lorca FC. An undisputed starter, he contributed with 36 appearances (play-offs included) and one goal as his side achieved promotion to Segunda División for the first time ever.

Pomares made his professional debut on 18 August 2017, starting in a 2–0 home win against Cultural y Deportiva Leonesa. He scored his first goal the following 19 May, netting his team's only in a 1–5 home loss against Real Valladolid.

On 7 August 2018, after Lorca's relegation, Pomares signed a two-year deal with Extremadura UD still in the second division. Roughly one year later, he terminated his contract with the club, and subsequently signed a one-year deal with fellow league team AD Alcorcón.

On 16 August 2020, Pomares signed a two-year contract with CD Tenerife. On 7 July 2022, he moved to fellow second division side Real Oviedo also on a two-year deal.

On 29 July 2025, after contributed with 27 appearances overall during the season as the Asturians achieved promotion to La Liga, Pomares was released from the club. Two days later, he moved to Real Zaragoza in the second division on a one-year deal.
