= Nico Melamed =

Spanish footballer (born 2001)

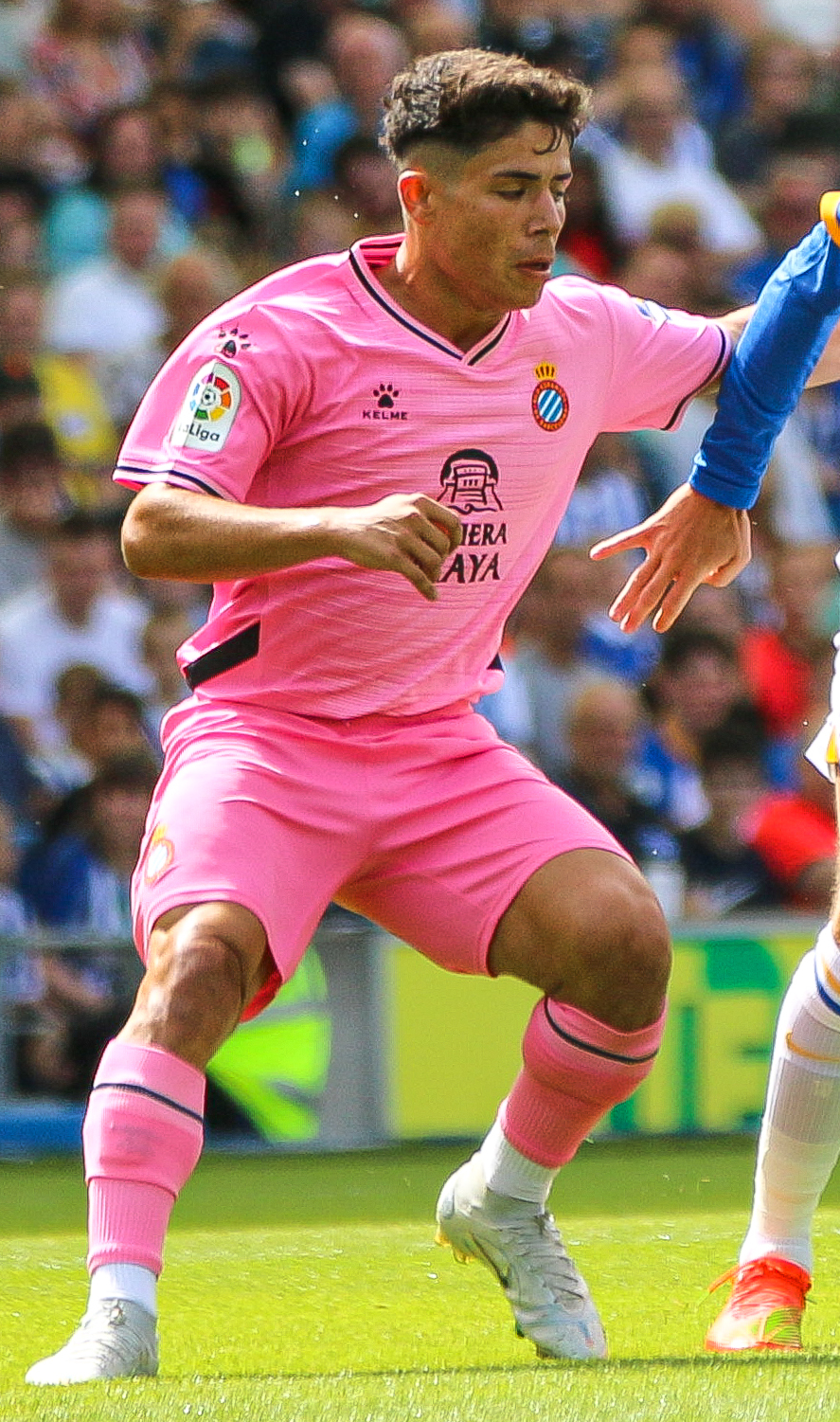
- Melamed with Espanyol in 2022

Personal information
- Full name: Nicolás Melamed Ribaudo
- Date of birth: 11 April 2001 (age 25)
- Place of birth: Castelldefels, Spain
- Height: 1.73 m (5 ft 8 in)
- Position: Attacking midfielder

Team information
- Current team: Almería
- Number: 10

Youth career
- Atlètic Vilafranca
- Cornellà
- 2013–2019: Espanyol

Senior career*
Years	Team	Apps	(Gls)
2019–2020	Espanyol B	39	(9)
2019–2024	Espanyol	124	(13)
2024–	Almería	66	(10)

International career^{‡}
2020	Spain U19	2	(0)
2021	Spain U21	1	(0)
- * Club domestic league appearances and goals as of 3 June 2026 ‡ National team caps and goals as of 8 October 2021

Nicolás "Nico" Melamed Ribaudo (born 11 April 2001) is a Spanish professional footballer who plays as an attacking midfielder for Segunda Division club UD Almería.

== Club career ==
=== Espanyol ===
Born in Castelldefels, Barcelona, Catalonia, Melamed joined RCD Espanyol's youth setup in 2013, after representing UE Cornellà and FP Atlètic Vilafranca. He made his senior debut with the reserves on 17 February 2019, starting in a 1–1 Segunda División B away draw against SD Ejea.

Melamed renewed his contract with the Pericos on 29 April 2019, signing until 2023. He scored his first senior goal on 5 May 2019, netting his team's second in a 2–0 away defeat of former side Cornellà; by doing so, he became the first player from the 21st century to score for Espanyol in any senior category.

Melamed made his professional debut on 15 August 2019, coming on as a second-half substitute for Matías Vargas in a 3–0 home defeat of FC Luzern, for the season's UEFA Europa League; he was also the first player from the 21st century to feature with the first team. He made his La Liga debut on 25 June of the following year, replacing Adri Embarba in a 1–0 away loss against Real Betis.

Definitely promoted to the main squad for the 2020–21 campaign, now in Segunda División, Melamed scored his first professional goal on 4 October 2020, in a 1–0 away win against CE Sabadell FC. He scored a further five times in 33 appearances during the season, as his side returned to the top tier.

On 31 August 2021, Melamed changed kit number to the 21 jersey, worn by former Espanyol youth graduate Daniel Jarque. He scored his first goal in the main category on 8 May 2022, netting the equalizer in a 1–1 home draw against CA Osasuna.

=== Almería ===
On 3 July 2024, after helping the Pericos in their promotion back to the top tier, free agent Melamed signed a six-year contract with UD Almería, now in the second division.

== Personal life ==
Melamed was born in Spain and is of Argentine descent through his mother. His maternal grandfather Felipe Ribaudo (1940–1998) was an Argentine footballer who played for Estudiantes.
