= Sergi Darder =

Spanish footballer (born 1993)

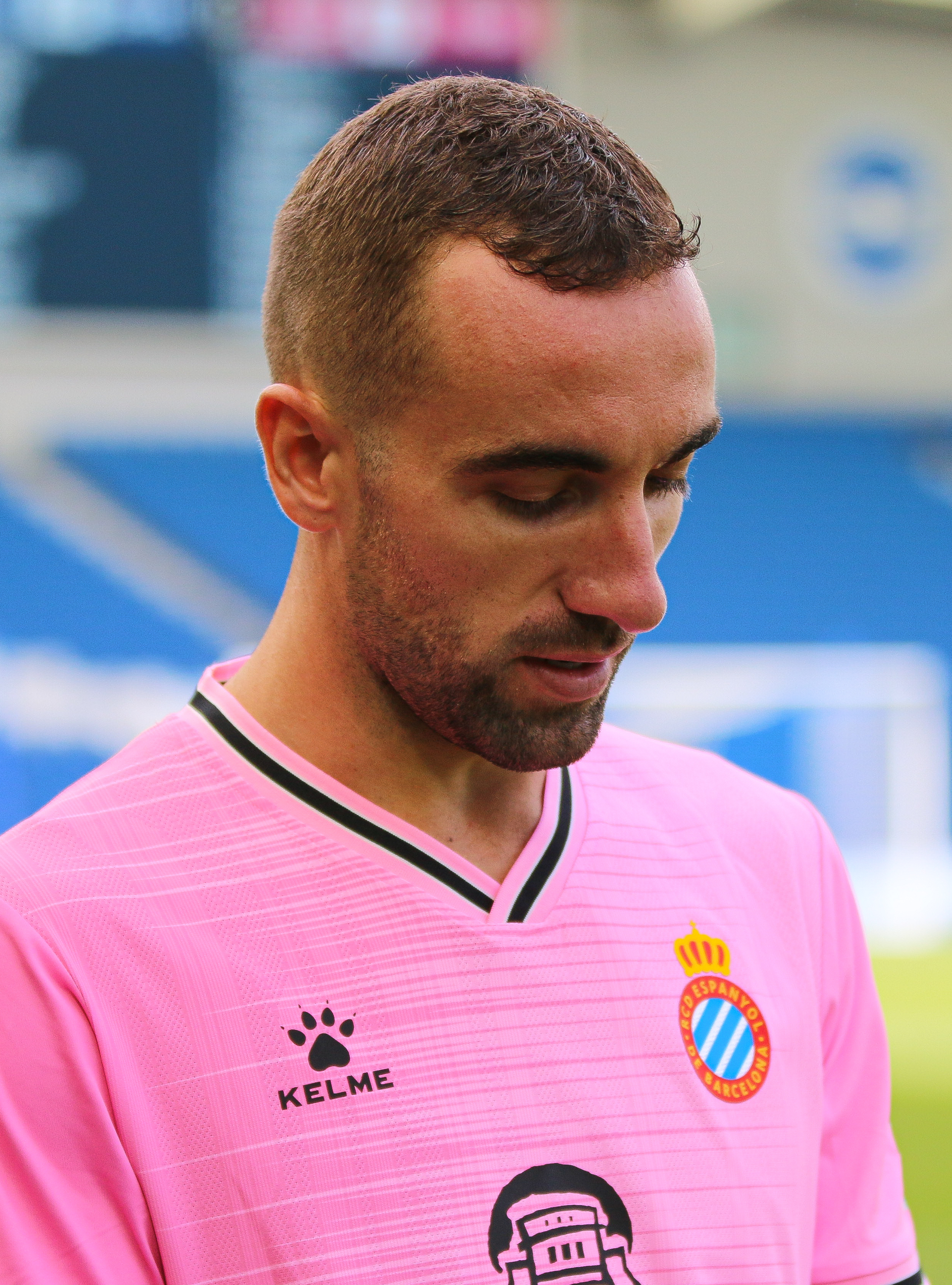
- Darder with Espanyol in 2022

Personal information
- Full name: Sergi Darder Moll
- Date of birth: 22 December 1993 (age 32)
- Place of birth: Artà, Spain
- Height: 1.80 m (5 ft 11 in)
- Position: Central midfielder

Team information
- Current team: Mallorca
- Number: 10

Youth career
- 1996–1997: Artà
- 1997–2007: Manacor
- 2007–2011: Espanyol

Senior career*
| Years | Team | Apps | (Gls) |
| 2011–2012 | Espanyol B | 36 | (2) |
| 2012–2013 | Málaga B | 37 | (1) |
| 2013–2015 | Málaga | 64 | (6) |
| 2015–2018 | Lyon | 52 | (3) |
| 2017–2018 | → Espanyol (loan) | 35 | (1) |
| 2018–2023 | Espanyol | 184 | (21) |
| 2023– | Mallorca | 121 | (5) |

International career
| 2010 | Spain U17 | 7 | (0) |
| 2011 | Spain U18 | 2 | (0) |
| 2013–2014 | Spain U21 | 3 | (0) |
- * Club domestic league appearances and goals as of 18:15, 24 October 2026 (UTC)

Sergi Darder Moll (born 22 December 1993) is a Spanish professional footballer who plays as a central midfielder for Segunda División club Mallorca.

== Club career ==
=== Espanyol and Málaga ===
Born in Artà, Balearic Islands, Darder played for two local clubs before joining RCD Espanyol in summer 2007, aged 13. His first season as a senior was 2011–12, when he competed with the reserves in the Tercera División.

Darder signed for Málaga CF in July 2012, being assigned to the B side also in the fourth tier. The following year, he impressed first-team manager Bernd Schuster who called him for the preseason, where he scored two goals, including one in a 3–2 defeat to Aston Villa at Villa Park on 10 August.

On 14 August 2013, it was announced that Darder was officially promoted to the main squad, along with Fabrice Olinga and Samu García. He made his La Liga debut three days later, starting the 1–0 away loss against Valencia CF.

Darder signed a professional contract with Málaga on 4 November 2013, running until 2017. He scored his first goal for the Andalusians on 31 March of the following year, closing a 2–1 win over Real Betis at the Estadio Benito Villamarín.

=== Lyon ===
On 30 August 2015, Darder joined Olympique Lyonnais on a five-year contract, for €12 million. His Ligue 1 debut arrived on 20 September, as he was replaced midway through the second half of a 1–1 draw at Olympique de Marseille.

Darder scored his second league goal of the season on 28 February 2016 – third overall – netting after a fine individual effort to help impose Paris Saint-Germain FC their first loss in 36 games (2–1 at Stade de Gerland).

=== Return to Espanyol ===
On 1 September 2017, Darder returned to Espanyol after agreeing to a one-year loan with an €8 million buyout clause. The move was made permanent on 5 March 2018 after the player made a required number of appearances, and he signed a five-year deal which was rendered effective on 1 July.

Darder scored six times from 40 appearances in the 2020–21 campaign, with his team being crowned Segunda División champions and thus promoting. On 25 August 2022, he signed an extension until 2026.

=== Mallorca ===
On 11 August 2023, following Espanyol's relegation, Darder joined fellow top-flight RCD Mallorca on a five-year contract. On 27 February 2024, he scored the decisive penalty in a 5–4 shootout victory against Real Sociedad to qualify his side for the final of the Copa del Rey.

== International career ==
All youth levels comprised, Darder earned 12 caps for Spain. His debut for the under-21 team arrived on 14 November 2013, as he played the last 35 minutes of a 6–1 away rout of Bosnia and Herzegovina in the 2015 UEFA European Championship qualifiers.

== Career statistics ==
As of match played 24 October 2026

Appearances and goals by club, season and competition
| Club | Season | League | | | National Cup (Note: Includes Copa del Rey and Coupe de France) | | League Cup (Note: Includes Coupe de la Ligue) | | Europe | | Other | | Total | |
| Club | Season | Division | Apps | Goals | Apps | Goals | Apps | Goals | Apps | Goals | Apps | Goals | Apps | Goals |
|---|---|---|---|---|---|---|---|---|---|---|---|---|---|---|
| Málaga | 2013–14 | La Liga | 29 | 2 | 1 | 0 | – | | – | | 0 | 0 | 30 | 2 |
| Málaga | 2014–15 | La Liga | 34 | 4 | 2 | 0 | – | | – | | 0 | 0 | 36 | 4 |
| Málaga | 2015–16 | La Liga | 1 | 0 | 0 | 0 | – | | – | | 0 | 0 | 1 | 0 |
| Málaga | Total | | 64 | 6 | 3 | 0 | – | | – | | 0 | 0 | 67 | 6 |
| Lyon | 2015–16 | Ligue 1 | 26 | 2 | 3 | 1 | 2 | 0 | 4 (Note: Appearances in UEFA Champions League) | 0 | 0 | 0 | 35 | 3 |
| Lyon | 2016–17 | Ligue 1 | 23 | 1 | 2 | 0 | 1 | 0 | 8 (Note: Appearances in UEFA Champions League and UEFA Europa League) | 1 | 1 (Note: Appearances in Trophée des Champions) | 0 | 35 | 2 |
| Lyon | 2017–18 | Ligue 1 | 3 | 0 | 0 | 0 | 0 | 0 | 0 | 0 | 0 | 0 | 3 | 0 |
| Lyon | Total | | 52 | 3 | 5 | 1 | 3 | 0 | 12 | 1 | 1 | 0 | 73 | 5 |
| Espanyol (loan) | 2017–18 | La Liga | 35 | 1 | 5 | 0 | – | | 0 | 0 | 0 | 0 | 40 | 1 |
| Espanyol | 2018–19 | La Liga | 34 | 4 | 6 | 1 | – | | 0 | 0 | 1 (Note: Appearances in Supercopa de Catalunya) | 0 | 41 | 5 |
| Espanyol | 2019–20 | La Liga | 36 | 2 | 0 | 0 | – | | 8 (Note: Appearances in UEFA Europa League) | 1 | 0 | 0 | 44 | 3 |
| Espanyol | 2020–21 | Segunda División | 40 | 6 | 1 | 0 | – | | 0 | 0 | 0 | 0 | 41 | 6 |
| Espanyol | 2021–22 | La Liga | 36 | 3 | 3 | 0 | – | | 0 | 0 | 0 | 0 | 39 | 3 |
| Espanyol | 2022–23 | La Liga | 38 | 6 | 3 | 1 | – | | 0 | 0 | 0 | 0 | 41 | 7 |
| Espanyol | Total | | 219 | 22 | 18 | 2 | – | | 8 | 1 | 1 | 0 | 246 | 25 |
| Mallorca | 2023–24 | La Liga | 36 | 2 | 5 | 0 | – | | 0 | 0 | 0 | 0 | 41 | 2 |
| Mallorca | 2024–25 | La Liga | 38 | 2 | 1 | 0 | – | | – | | 1 (Note: Appearance in Supercopa de España) | 0 | 40 | 2 |
| Mallorca | 2025–26 | La Liga | 38 | 1 | 2 | 0 | – | | – | | – | | 40 | 1 |
| Mallorca | 2026–27 | Segunda División | 9 | 0 | 0 | 0 | – | | – | | – | | 9 | 0 |
| Mallorca | Total | | 121 | 5 | 8 | 0 | – | | – | | 1 | 0 | 130 | 5 |
| Career total | | | 456 | 36 | 34 | 3 | 3 | 0 | 20 | 2 | 3 | 0 | 516 | 41 |

== Honours ==
Espanyol

- Segunda División: 2020–21
