= 2019–20 Real Oviedo season =

Real Oviedo
2019–20 season
- President: Jorge Menéndez
- Head coach: José Ángel Ziganda
- Stadium: Carlos Tartiere
- Segunda División: 15th
- Copa del Rey: First round
- Top goalscorer: League: Alfredo Ortuño (14); All: Alfredo Ortuño (14)
- Highest home attendance: 20,499 vs. Sporting Gijón (17 November 2019)
- Lowest home attendance: 8,667 vs. Málaga (5 January 2020)
Home colours	Away colours	Third colours

The 2019–20 season was the 37th season in Segunda División played by Real Oviedo, a Spanish football club based in Oviedo, Asturias. It covered a period from 1 July 2019 to 30 June 2020. It was extended extraordinarily beyond 30 June due to the COVID-19 pandemic in Spain.

== Squad information ==
=== First team squad ===
As of 9 February 2020

No.	Name	Nat.	Place of Birth	Date of Birth (Age)	Joined	Signed From	Transfer Fee	Ends
Goalkeepers
1	Alfonso Herrero	(Spain)	(Castilla–La Mancha) Toledo	21 April 1994 (age 32)	2016	Vetusta	-	2020
13	Nereo Champagne	(Argentina) (Italy)	(Argentina) Salto	20 January 1985 (age 41)	2018	(Argentina) Olimpo	Free	2020
25	Andriy Lunin	(Ukraine)	(Ukraine) Krasnohrad	11 February 1999 (age 27)	2020	Real Madrid	Loan	2020
Defenders
2	Simone Grippo	(Switzerland) (Italy)	(Switzerland) Ettingen	12 December 1988 (age 37)	2020	Zaragoza	Free	2020
3	Alejandro Arribas	(Spain)	(Community of Madrid) Madrid	1 May 1989 (age 37)	2019	(Mexico) UNAM	Free	2022
6	Carlos Hernández	(Spain)	(Andalusia) Jaén	15 September 1990 (age 35)	2017	Lugo	Free	2021
12	Juanjo Nieto	(Spain)	(Valencian Community) Castellón de la Plana	3 October 1994 (age 31)	2019	Hércules	Free	2021
18	Christian Fernández	(Spain)	(Cantabria) Santander	15 October 1985 (age 40)	2016	Las Palmas	Free	2020
23	Mossa	(Spain)	(Valencian Community) Valencia	24 January 1989 (age 37)	2017	Gimnàstic	Undisclosed	2021
24	Lucas Ahijado	(Spain)	(Asturias) Oviedo	30 January 1995 (age 31)	2009	Vetusta	-	2020
Midfielders
4	Luismi	(Spain)	(Andalusia) Puerto Serrano	5 May 1992 (age 34)	2020	Valladolid	Loan	2020
7	Sebas Coris	(Spain)	(Catalonia) Tossa de Mar	31 May 1993 (age 33)	2020	Girona	Free	2020
8	Marco Sangalli	(Spain)	(Basque Country (autonomous community)) San Sebastián	7 February 1992 (age 34)	2019	Alcorcón	Free	2021
10	Saúl Berjón	(Spain)	(Asturias) Oviedo	24 May 1986 (age 40)	2017	(Mexico) UNAM	Free	2020
11	Yoel Bárcenas	(Panama)	(Panama) Colón	23 October 1993 (age 32)	2018	(Mexico) Tijuana	Loan	2020
14	Jimmy Suárez	(Spain)	(Asturias) Oviedo	31 December 1996 (age 29)	2016	Vetusta	-	2022
19	Borja Sánchez	(Spain)	(Asturias) Oviedo	26 February 1996 (age 30)	2018	Vetusta	-	2020
20	Sergio Tejera	(Spain)	(Catalonia) Barcelona	28 May 1990 (age 36)	2018	Gimnàstic	Free	2020
21	Lolo González	(Spain)	(Andalusia) Sanlúcar de Barrameda	22 July 1991 (age 35)	2018	Vetusta	-	2020
22	Edu Cortina	(Spain)	(Asturias) Oviedo	25 September 1996 (age 29)	2006	Vetusta	-	2020
Forwards
9	Rodri	(Spain)	(Castile and León) Soria	6 June 1990 (age 36)	2020	(England) Bristol City	Free	2020
15	Alfredo Ortuño	(Spain)	(Region of Murcia) Yecla	21 January 1991 (age 35)	2019	Albacete	Loan	2020
17	Ibrahima Baldé	(Senegal)	(Senegal) Dakar	4 April 1989 (age 37)	2018	(Romania) CFR Cluj	Free	2020

=== Reserve team ===
Note: Flags indicate national team as defined under FIFA eligibility rules; some limited exceptions apply. Players may hold more than one non-FIFA nationality.

No.	Pos.	Nation	Player
27	FW	ESP	Steven Prieto
28	MF	ESP	Riki Rodríguez
29	FW	ESP	Javi Cueto
30	FW	GHA	Samuel Obeng

No.	Pos.	Nation	Player
31	MF	ESP	Jorge Mier
32	DF	ESP	Javi Mier
33	DF	ESP	Josín Martínez
37	MF	ESP	Viti Rozada

=== Technical Staff ===
Position	Staff
Head coach	José Ángel Ziganda
Assistant coach	Bingen Arostegui
Physical trainer	Alberto Martínez
Goalkeeping coach	Sergio Segura

Last updated: 21 February 2020
Source: realoviedo.es

=== Managerial changes ===
Outgoing manager	Manner of departure	Date of vacancy	Position in table	Incoming manager	Date of appointment
(Argentina) Sergio Egea	Sacked	15 September 2019	22nd	(Spain) Javi Rozada	15 September 2019
(Spain) Javi Rozada	Sacked	18 February 2020	19th	(Spain) José Ángel Ziganda	18 February 2020

== Transfers ==
=== In ===
No.	Pos.	Nat.	Name	Age	EU	Moving from	Type	Transfer window	Ends	Transfer fee	Source
21	MF	(Spain)	Lolo González	27	EU	Extremadura	Loan Return	Summer	2020		
14	MF	(Spain)	Jimmy Suárez	22	EU	Oviedo B	Promoted	Summer	2022	Youth system	realoviedo.es
22	MF	(Spain)	Edu Cortina	22	EU	Oviedo B	Promoted	Summer	2020	Youth system	realoviedo.es
24	DF	(Spain)	Lucas Ahijado	24	EU	Oviedo B	Promoted	Summer	2020	Youth system	realoviedo.es
19	MF	(Spain)	Borja Sánchez	23	EU	Oviedo B	Promoted	Summer	2020	Youth system	realoviedo.es
8	MF	(Spain)	Marco Sangalli	27	EU	Alcorcón	Transfer	Summer	2021	Free	realoviedo.es
5	DF	(Spain)	Javi Fernández	21	EU	UCAM Murcia	Transfer	Summer	2022	Undisclosed	realoviedo.es
3	DF	(Spain)	Alejandro Arribas	30	EU	(Mexico) UNAM	Transfer	Summer	2022	Free	realoviedo.es
15	FW	(Spain)	Alfredo Ortuño	28	EU	Albacete	Loan	Summer	2020	Free	realoviedo.es
12	DF	(Spain)	Juanjo Nieto	24	EU	Hércules	Transfer	Summer	2021	Free	realoviedo.es
11	MF	(Panama)	Yoel Bárcenas	25	Non-EU	(Mexico) Tijuana	Loan	Summer	2020	Free	realoviedo.es
4	MF	(Spain)	Luismi	27	EU	Valladolid	Loan	Winter	2020	Free	realoviedo.es
25	GK	(Ukraine)	Andriy Lunin	20	Non-EU	Real Madrid	Loan	Winter	2020	Free	realoviedo.es
9	FW	(Spain)	Rodri	29	EU	(England) Bristol City	Transfer	Winter	2020	Free	realoviedo.es
2	DF	(Switzerland)	Simone Grippo	31	EU	Zaragoza	Transfer	Winter	2020	Free	realoviedo.es
7	MF	(Spain)	Sebas Coris	26	EU	Girona	Transfer	Winter	2020	Free	realoviedo.es

=== Out ===
No.	Pos.	Nat.	Name	Age	EU	Moving to	Type	Transfer window	Transfer fee	Source
3	DF	(Mexico)	Oswaldo Alanís	30	Non-EU	(Mexico) Guadalajara	Transfer	Summer	Free	chivasdecorazon.com.mx
24	MF	(Spain)	Javi Muñoz	24	EU	Alavés	Loan Return	Summer		realoviedo.es
33	DF	(Spain)	Javi Hernández	21	EU	Real Madrid	Loan return	Summer		realoviedo.es
11	MF	(Panama)	Yoel Bárcenas	25	Non-EU	(Mexico) Cafetaleros	Loan Return	Summer		realoviedo.es
8	MF	(Spain)	Ramón Folch	29	EU	Elche	Transfer	Summer	Free	elchecf.es
5	DF	(Argentina)	Juan Forlín	31	EU	Unattached	Contract Ended	Summer		realoviedo.es
9	FW	(Spain)	Toché	36	EU	Burgos	Transfer	Summer	Free	burgoscf.es
19	DF	(Spain)	Carlos Martínez	33	EU	Burgos	Transfer	Summer	Free	burgoscf.es
2	DF	(Iceland)	Johannesson	26	EU	Cartagena	Loan	Winter	Free	futbolclubcartagena.com
9	FW	(Spain)	Joselu	28	EU	Tenerife	Loan	Winter	Free	clubdeportivotenerife.es
7	MF	(Spain)	Omar Ramos	32	EU	Ponferradina	Transfer	Winter	Free	sdponferradina.com
5	DF	(Spain)	Javi Fernández	22	EU	Villarreal B	Loan	Winter	Free	Twitter

== Pre-season and friendlies ==
Win Draw Loss Fixtures

13 July 2019 Friendly	Oviedo	0–1	Oviedo B	Oviedo
10:30 CEST		Report	Amez 54'	Stadium: El Requexón

20 July 2019 Friendly	Oviedo	1–0	Unionistas	San Martín del Rey Aurelio
19:30 CEST	Steven 42'	Report		Stadium: El Florán

27 July 2019 Trofeo Emma Cuervo	Ponferradina	1–0	Oviedo	Navia
19:00 CEST	Javi Mier 89' (o.g.)	Report		Stadium: El Pardo

31 July 2019 Trofeo Vila de Foz	Lugo	1–1 (5–4 p)	Oviedo	Foz
19:30 CEST	Tete 33'	Report	Samu Obeng 55'	Stadium: Martínez Otero

7 August 2019 Friendly	Salamanca	0–1	Oviedo	Villares de la Reina
19:30 CEST		Report	Ibra 79'	Stadium: Helmántico; Referee: Alfonso Vicente Moral (Castile and León)

10 August 2019 Torneo Integra Energía	Oviedo	1–2	Alavés	Avilés
19:30 CEST	Ortuño 4'	Report	Rioja 9'; Joselu 58'	Stadium: Román Suárez Puerta

== Competitions ==
=== Segunda División ===
Pos	Team	Pld	W	D	L	GF	GA	GD	Pts
13	Sporting Gijón	42	14	12	16	40	38	+2	54
14	Málaga	42	11	20	11	35	33	+2	53 (Note: Málaga finished ahead of Oviedo on head-to-head points: Málaga 2–1 Oviedo, Oviedo 1–1 Málaga.)
15	Oviedo	42	13	14	15	49	53	−4	53
16	Lugo	42	12	16	14	43	54	−11	52 (Note: Lugo finished ahead of Albacete on head-to-head points: Albacete 0–1 Lugo, Lugo 1–0 Albacete.)
17	Albacete	42	13	13	16	36	46	−10	52

Source: LaLiga Soccerway
Rules for classification: 1) points; 2) head-to-head points; 3) head-to-head goal difference; 4) goal difference; 5) number of goals scored

==== Results summary ====
Overall								Home						Away					
Pld	W	D	L	GF	GA	GD	Pts	W	D	L	GF	GA	GD	W	D	L	GF	GA	GD
42	13	14	15	49	53	−4	53	7	11	3	24	20	+4	6	3	12	25	33	−8

Last updated: 30 July 2020.
Source: La Liga

==== Results by round ====
Round	1	2	3	4	5	6	7	8	9	10	11	12	13	14	15	16	17	18	19	20	21	22	23	24	25	26	27	28	29	30	31	32	33	34	35	36	37	38	39	40	41	42
Ground	A	H	A	A	H	H	A	H	A	H	A	H	A	H	A	H	A	H	A	H	A	H	A	H	A	H	A	H	A	H	A	H	H	A	H	A	H	A	H	A	H	A
Result	L	D	L	L	L	D	L	D	W	D	W	W	L	D	L	D	L	W	W	L	D	D	L	D	D	W	D	L	L	W	W	D	D	W	D	L	W	L	W	W	W	L
Position	15	16	20	22	22	22	22	22	22	22	18	16	18	18	19	20	21	18	16	17	17	17	17	19	19	18	18	19	21	20	17	18	20	16	16	19	17	19	17	14	14	15

Updated to match(es) played on 30 July 2020. Source: La Liga
A = Away; H = Home; W = Win; D = Draw; L = Loss

==== Matches ====
18 August 2019 1	Deportivo La Coruña	3–2	Oviedo	A Coruña
18:00 CEST	Koné 20'; Aketxe 56'; Christian Santos 88'	Report	Carlos Hernández (yellow card) 38'; Mossa (yellow card) 61'; Somma 69' (o.g.); Tejera (yellow card) 70'; Obeng 78'	Stadium: Abanca-Riazor; Attendance: 20,534; Referee: Daniel Ocón Arráiz (La Rioja)

24 August 2019 2	Oviedo	1–1	Lugo	Oviedo
18:00 CEST	Ortuño 5'; Juanjo (yellow card) 27' (yellow-red card) 49'	Report	Campabadal (yellow card) 15'; Canella (yellow card) 37' (yellow-red card) 62'; Gerard (yellow card) 53'; Álex López (yellow card) 72'; Cristian Herrera 90+1'	Stadium: Carlos Tartiere; Attendance: 11,446; Referee: José Antonio López Toca (Cantabria)

31 August 2019 3	Fuenlabrada	2–1	Oviedo	Fuenlabrada
18:00 CEST	Jeisson 28'; Anderson 90'	Report	Ortuño 42'; Arribas (yellow card) 48'; Tejera (red card) 87'	Stadium: Fernando Torres; Attendance: 5,320 (provisional); Referee: Alejandro Muñiz Ruiz (Galicia)

8 September 2019 4	Mirandés	2–1	Oviedo	Miranda de Ebro
18:00 CEST	González (yellow card) 15'; Merquelanz 34'; Barco 89'	Report	Ortuño 10'; Lolo González (yellow card) 28'; Bolaño (red card) 65'	Stadium: Anduva; Attendance: 3,574; Referee: Miguel Ángel Ortiz Arias (Madrid)

15 September 2019 5	Oviedo	0–2	Elche	Oviedo
16:00 CEST	Tejera (yellow card) 24' (yellow-red card) 78'; Obeng (red card) 73'	Report	Yacine 15', 52'; Juan Cruz (yellow card) 26'; Villar (yellow card) 66'	Stadium: Carlos Tartiere; Attendance: 11,263; Referee: Jorge Figueroa Vázquez (Andalusia)

19 September 2019 6	Oviedo	1–1	Extremadura	Oviedo
19:00 CEST	Bolaño (yellow card) 16'; Arribas (yellow card) 28'; Edu Cortina (yellow card) 38'; Ortuño 85'	Report	Zarfino (yellow card) 39'; Rocha (yellow card) 68'; Kike Márquez 70'; Casto (yellow card) 80'; Fran Cruz (yellow card) 90+1'	Stadium: Carlos Tartiere; Attendance: 10,624; Referee: Iosu Galech Apezteguía (Navarre)

22 September 2019 7	Ponferradina	2–1	Oviedo	Ponferrada
12:00 CEST	Manu García (yellow card) 42'; Son (yellow card) 57'; Yuri 60'; Valcarce 64'	Report	Lolo González (yellow card) 29'; Mossa (yellow card) 31'; Ortuño 55'; Tejera (yellow card) 79'	Stadium: El Toralín; Attendance: 6,535; Referee: Rubén Ávalos Barrera (Catalonia)

29 September 2019 8	Oviedo	2–2	Zaragoza	Oviedo
18:30 CEST	Ortuño 2', 55' (pen.); Tejera (yellow card) 36'; Sangalli (yellow card) 46'; Saúl Berjón (yellow card) 68'; Borja Sánchez (yellow card) 83'	Report	Suárez 37' (pen.), 66'; Guti (yellow card) 50'; Grippo (yellow card) 62'; Pombo (yellow card) 76'	Stadium: Carlos Tartiere; Attendance: 12,627; Referee: Isidro Díaz de Mera Escuderos (Castile–La Mancha)

2 October 2019 9	Tenerife	0–1	Oviedo	Santa Cruz de Tenerife
20:00 WEST, 21:00 CEST	Aitor Sanz (yellow card) 51'; Borja Lasso (yellow card) 60'; Alberto (yellow card) 65'; Nahuel (yellow card) 88'	Report	Bárcenas 25'; Ortuño (yellow card) 34'; Sangalli (yellow card) 54'; Mossa (yellow card) 58'; Nereo (yellow card) 67'	Stadium: Heliodoro Rodríguez López; Attendance: 9,743 (provisional); Referee: José Antonio López Toca (Cantabria)

6 October 2019 10	Oviedo	1–1	Numancia	Oviedo
16:00 CEST	Bárcenas 17' (yellow card) 54'; Tejera (yellow card) 63'	Report	Noguera (yellow card) 65'; Alain (yellow card) 79'; Gus Ledes (yellow card) 87'; Carlos Gutiérrez 90+1'	Stadium: Carlos Tartiere; Attendance: 12,263; Referee: Daniel Jesús Trujillo Suárez (Tenerife)

13 October 2019 11	Albacete	1–2	Oviedo	Albacete
18:00 CEST	Karim (yellow card) 26'; Dani Ojeda 32'; Barri (yellow card) 39'	Report	Omar Ramos (yellow card) 23'; Lolo González (yellow card) 60'; Sangalli 75'; Borja Sánchez 89'	Stadium: Carlos Belmonte; Attendance: 9,115; Referee: Juan Luis Pulido Santana (Las Palmas)

20 October 2019 12	Oviedo	4–2	Girona	Oviedo
18:00 CEST	Ortuño 8', 34'; Bolaño (yellow card) 24'; Borja Sánchez 56'; Mossa (yellow card) 87'; Bárcenas 90+1'	Report	Granell (yellow card) 15' (yellow-red card) 17'; Stuani 45' (yellow card) 70'; Johan Mojica (yellow card) 52'; Marc Gual 84'	Stadium: Carlos Tartiere; Attendance: 11,719; Referee: Iñaki Vicandi Garrido (Basque Country)

26 October 2019 13	Málaga	2–1	Oviedo	Málaga
20:00 CEST	Keidi Bare (yellow card) 33'; Renato (yellow card) 36'; Sadiku (yellow card) 49'; Mikel (yellow card) 52'; Antoñín 55' (yellow card) 57'; Adrián 63' (pen.); Munir (yellow card) 88'; Diego González (yellow card) 90+4'	Report	Carlos Hernández (yellow card) 47'; Juanjo Nieto (yellow card) 47'; Mossa (yellow card) 60'; Lolo González (yellow card) 74' (yellow-red card) 90+7'; Ibra 84'	Stadium: La Rosaleda; Attendance: 16,371; Referee: Iosu Galech Apezteguía (Navarre)

1 November 2019 14	Oviedo	0–0	Almería	Oviedo
21:00 CET	Tejera (yellow card) 14'	Report	Lazo (yellow card) 39'; Balliu (yellow card) 72'; Vada (yellow card) 90+1'	Stadium: Carlos Tartiere; Attendance: 11,389; Referee: Dámaso Arcediano Monescillo (Castile–La Mancha)

9 November 2019 15	Huesca	3–1	Oviedo	Huesca
16:00 CET	Raba 15'; Mikel Rico 20', 87'; Javi Galán (yellow card) 52'; Datković (yellow card) 90+5'	Report	Carlos Hernández (yellow card) 5'; Bolaño 32'; Nereo (yellow card) 80'; Arribas (yellow card) 82'	Stadium: El Alcoraz; Attendance: 6,223; Referee: Luis Mario Milla Alvendiz (Andalusia)

17 November 2019 16	Oviedo	0–0	Sporting Gijón	Oviedo
16:00 CET	Ortuño (yellow card) 25'; Tejera (yellow card) 41'; Lolo González (yellow card) 70'	Report	Pablo Pérez (yellow card) 18'; Molinero (yellow card) 37'; Nacho Méndez (yellow card) 54'; Javi Fuego (yellow card) 65'	Stadium: Carlos Tartiere; Attendance: 20,499; Referee: Aitor Gorostegui Fernández-Ortega (Basque Country)

24 November 2019 17	Las Palmas	3–1	Oviedo	Las Palmas
18:00 CET, 17:00 WET	Narváez 3'; Benito (yellow card) 31'; Jonathan Viera 39', 77'; Ruiz de Galarreta (yellow card) 60'	Report	Sangalli (yellow card) 49'; Javi Fernández (yellow card) 73'; Arribas (yellow card) 75'; Bárcenas 86'	Stadium: Gran Canaria; Attendance: 11,727; Referee: Jon Ander González Esteban (Basque Country)

1 December 2019 18	Oviedo	2–1	Rayo Vallecano	Oviedo
16:00 CET	Juanjo Nieto 1'; Bolaño (yellow card) 44'; Ortuño 83' (pen.); Sangalli (yellow card) 90+3'	Report	Embarba 11'; Ulloa (yellow card) 17'; Saveljich (yellow card) 51'; Catena (yellow card) 83'; Mario Suárez (yellow card) 90+4'	Stadium: Carlos Tartiere; Attendance: 10,776; Referee: Juan Luis Pulido Santana (Las Palmas)

6 December 2019 19	Alcorcón	1–3	Oviedo	Alcorcón
18:30 CET	Richard Boateng 22'; Dorca (yellow card) 51'; Laure (yellow card) 83'	Report	Borja Sánchez 11'; Bárcenas 15', 74' (yellow card) 61'; Juanjo Nieto (yellow card) 56'	Stadium: Santo Domingo; Attendance: 2,516; Referee: Iñaki Vicandi Garrido (Basque Country)

15 December 2019 20	Oviedo	0–2	Cádiz	Oviedo
16:00 CET	Juanjo Nieto (yellow card) 19'; Jimmy (yellow card) 76'; Ibra (yellow card) 90+1'	Report	Álex 33'; Querol 66'; Fali (yellow card) 90+1'	Stadium: Carlos Tartiere; Attendance: 11,924; Referee: Daniel Ocón Arráiz (La Rioja)

21 December 2019 21	Racing Santander	1–1	Oviedo	Santander
20:00 CET	Jordi Figueras 39'; Moi Delgado (yellow card) 83' (yellow-red card) 90+1'	Report	Arribas (yellow card) 2'; Juanjo Nieto 15' (yellow card) 54'; Bolaño (yellow card) 66'; Tejera (red card) 66'; Ortuño (yellow card) 74'; Nereo (yellow card) 90'	Stadium: El Sardinero; Attendance: 14,537; Referee: Alejandro Muñiz Ruiz (Galicia)

5 January 2020 22	Oviedo	1–1	Málaga	Oviedo
21:00 CET	Sangalli (yellow card) 12' (goal) 26'; Javi Mier (yellow card) 66'; Carlos Hernández (yellow card) 69'; Bolaño (yellow card) 84'	Report	Diego González (yellow card) 40'; Pacheco (yellow card) 59'; Sadiku 67' (pen.); Luis Hernández (yellow card) 80'	Stadium: Carlos Tartiere; Attendance: 8,667; Referee: Miguel Ángel Ortiz Arias (Madrid)

16 January 2020 23	Almería	2–0	Oviedo	Almería
21:00 CET	Petrović (yellow card) 34'; Darwin Núñez 62' (pen.), 73'; Lazo (yellow card) 71'; Balliu (yellow card) 85'	Report		Stadium: Juegos Mediterráneos; Attendance: 8,862; Referee: Óliver de la Fuente Ramos (Castile and León)

19 January 2020 24	Oviedo	1–1	Huesca	Oviedo
18:15 CET	Luismi (yellow card) 80'; Omar Ramos (yellow card) 90+2'; Ibra 90+7' (yellow card) 90+8'	Report	Eugeni 54'; Miguelón (yellow card) 76'; Luisinho (yellow card) 90+5'; Álvaro Fernández (yellow card) 90+6'	Stadium: Carlos Tartiere; Attendance: 11,006; Referee: Isidro Díaz de Mera Escuderos (Castile–La Mancha)

26 January 2020 25	Girona	1–1	Oviedo	Girona
20:30 CET	Stuani 54'; Gumbau (yellow card) 85'	Report	Saúl Berjón (yellow card) 43'; Jimmy (yellow card) 57'; Tejera 67'; Borja Sánchez (yellow card) 74'; Bolaño (yellow card) 78'	Stadium: Montilivi; Attendance: 6,126; Referee: Saúl Ais Reig (Valencian Community)

2 February 2020 26	Oviedo	3–1	Albacete	Oviedo
20:30 CET	Tejera 40' (yellow card) 69'; Bolaño (yellow card) 43'; Ibra (yellow card) 43' (goal) 57', 86'; Juanjo Nieto (yellow card) 54'; Carlos Hernández (yellow card) 66'	Report	Jon Erice (yellow card) 22'; Tomeu Nadal (yellow card) 41'; Pedro Sánchez 45' (yellow card) 47'	Stadium: Carlos Tartiere; Attendance: 17,735; Referee: Aitor Gorostegui Fernández-Ortega (Basque Country)

9 February 2020 27	Rayo Vallecano	1–1	Oviedo	Madrid
18:15 CET	Milić (yellow card) 27'; Isi (yellow card) 66'; Ulloa 75' (pen.); Trejo (yellow card) 79' (yellow-red card) 91'	Report	Rodrigo 28'; Mossa (yellow card) 38'; Bolaño (yellow card) 66'; Lolo González (yellow card) 73'	Stadium: Vallecas; Attendance: 10,447 (provisional); Referee: Daniel Jesús Trujillo Suárez (Tenerife)

15 February 2020 28	Oviedo	1–2	Alcorcón	Oviedo
18:15 CET	Mossa (yellow card) 19'; Sangalli (yellow card) 33'; Bolaño (yellow card) 35'; Ortuño 68' (pen.)	Report	Stoichkov 3', 39' (pen.); Luis Perea (yellow card) 41'; Diéguez (yellow card) 50'; Pomares (yellow card) 54'; David Fernández (yellow card) 56'; Arribas (yellow card) 64'	Stadium: Carlos Tartiere; Attendance: 18,247; Referee: Dámaso Arcediano Monescillo (Castile–La Mancha)

23 February 2020 29	Lugo	1–0	Oviedo	Lugo
12:00 CET	Hacen 15'; Seoane (yellow card) 56'; Gerard (yellow card) 68'; Ander (yellow card) 81'	Report	Bolaño (yellow card) 21'; Grippo (yellow card) 54'; Carlos Hernández (yellow card) 83'	Stadium: Anxo Carro; Attendance: 5,296; Referee: Santiago Varón Aceitón (Balearic Islands)

1 March 2020 30	Oviedo	1–0	Tenerife	Oviedo
18:15 CET	Arribas (yellow card) 36'; Carlos Hernández (yellow card) 78'; Rodrigo 88' (pen.); Tejera (yellow card) 90+7'	Report	Álex Muñoz (yellow card) 26'; Moore (yellow card) 30'; Šipčić (yellow card) 34'; Aitor Sanz (yellow card) 59'; Pérez (yellow card) 87'; Milla (yellow card) 90'	Stadium: Carlos Tartiere; Attendance: 16,814; Referee: Álvaro Moreno Aragón (Andalusia)

7 March 2020 31	Extremadura	1–2	Oviedo	Almendralejo
16:00 CET	Lomotey (yellow card) 37' (goal) 90+2'; Olabe (yellow card) 59'	Report	Rodrigo 16' (yellow card) 45'; Ortuño (yellow card) 20'; Carlos Hernández (yellow card) 52'; Marco Sangalli 65'; Juanjo Nieto (yellow card) 88'	Stadium: Ciudad de Almendralejo; Attendance: 8,563; Referee: José Antonio López Toca (Cantabria)

12 June 2020 32	Oviedo	0–0	Ponferradina	Oviedo
21:45 CEST	Luismi (yellow card) 65'; Lucas (yellow card) 73'	Report	Sielva (yellow card) 46'; Kaxe (yellow card) 48'; Larrea (yellow card) 67'	Stadium: Carlos Tartiere; Referee: Alejandro Muñiz Ruiz (Galicia)
Note: The originally scheduled match was postponed due to the COVID-19 pandemic, and rescheduled. It was played behind closed doors.

17 June 2020 33	Oviedo	2–2	Deportivo La Coruña	Oviedo
19:30 CEST	Luismi 26'; Bárcenas 45+1'; Tejera (yellow card) 77'; Mossa (yellow card) 82'; Bolaño (yellow card) 90+3'	Report	Ba (yellow card) 44'; Sabin Merino 45+3'; Nolaskoain 59'; Keko (yellow card) 90+3'	Stadium: Carlos Tartiere; Referee: Óliver de la Fuente Ramos (Castile and León)
Note: The originally scheduled match was postponed due to the COVID-19 pandemic, and rescheduled. It was played behind closed doors.

22 June 2020 34	Sporting Gijón	0–1	Oviedo	Gijón
21:45 CEST	Molinero (yellow card) 54'; Pablo Pérez (yellow card) 90+2'	Report	Luismi (yellow card) 6'; Bolaño (yellow card) 20'; Tejera (yellow card) 37'; Borja Sánchez 70'	Stadium: El Molinón; Referee: Jorge Figueroa Vázquez (Andalusia)
Note: The originally scheduled match was postponed due to the COVID-19 pandemic, and rescheduled. It was played behind closed doors.

25 June 2020 35	Oviedo	0–0	Fuenlabrada	Oviedo
21:45 CEST	Lolo González (yellow card) 32'; Lucas (yellow card) 77'; Arribas (yellow card) 84'	Report	Caye Quintana (yellow card) 28'; Sotillos (yellow card) 83'; Pathé Ciss (yellow card) 86'	Stadium: Carlos Tartiere; Referee: José Antonio López Toca (Cantabria)
Note: The originally scheduled match was postponed due to the COVID-19 pandemic, and rescheduled. It was played behind closed doors.

28 June 2020 36	Numancia	1–0	Oviedo	Soria
19:30 CEST	Higinio 24'; Bernardo (yellow card) 33'; Escassi (yellow card) 45+4'; Héctor Hernández (yellow card) 45+5'; Erik Morán (yellow card) 51'	Report	Bolaño (yellow card) 21'; Bárcenas (red card) 63'	Stadium: Los Pajaritos; Referee: Saúl Ais Reig (Valencian Community)
Note: The originally scheduled match was postponed due to the COVID-19 pandemic, and rescheduled. It was played behind closed doors.

1 July 2020 37	Oviedo	1–0	Mirandés	Oviedo
19:30 CEST	Ortuño 41' (pen.); Tejera (yellow card) 64'; Lunin (yellow card) 89'	Report	Carlos Julio (yellow card) 17'; Álvaro Rey (yellow card) 83'	Stadium: Carlos Tartiere; Referee: Iosu Galech Apezteguía (Navarre)
Note: The originally scheduled match was postponed due to the COVID-19 pandemic, and rescheduled. It was played behind closed doors.

4 July 2020 38	Cádiz	2–0	Oviedo	Cádiz
21:45 CEST	Álex (yellow card) 31'; Iza (yellow card) 36'; Lozano 44', 51'; Cala (yellow card) 64'; Sergio (yellow card) 82'	Report	Ibra (red card) 28'; Rodrigo (yellow card) 43'; Mossa (yellow card) 45+2'	Stadium: Ramón de Carranza; Referee: Javier Iglesias Villanueva (Galicia)
Note: The originally scheduled match was postponed due to the COVID-19 pandemic, and rescheduled. It was played behind closed doors.

8 July 2020 39	Oviedo	2–1	Las Palmas	Oviedo
19:30 CEST	Juanjo Nieto (yellow card) 24'; Ortuño 37'; Marco Sangalli 50'; Tejera (yellow card) 90+1'	Report	Fabio (yellow card) 15'; Álex Suárez (yellow card) 55'; Mauricio Lemos (yellow card) 64'; Rubén Castro 68'	Stadium: Carlos Tartiere; Referee: Alejandro Muñiz Ruiz (Galicia)
Note: The originally scheduled match was postponed due to the COVID-19 pandemic, and rescheduled. It was played behind closed doors.

12 July 2020 40	Zaragoza	2–4	Oviedo	Zaragoza
21:45 CEST	Guti (yellow card) 43'; Vigaray (yellow card) 57'; Puado (yellow card) 67'; Luis Suárez (yellow card) 85'; Linares 90+4'; Kagawa 90+7' (pen.)	Report	Samuel Obeng 15'; Sangalli 45'; Bárcenas 79'; Ortuño 90+1'	Stadium: La Romareda; Referee: Gorka Sagués Oscoz (Basque Country)
Note: The originally scheduled match was postponed due to the COVID-19 pandemic, and rescheduled. It was played behind closed doors.

17 July 2020 41	Oviedo	1–0	Racing Santander	Oviedo
21:00 CEST	Samuel Obeng 7'; Mossa (yellow card) 29'; Luismi (yellow card) 66'	Report	Nando (yellow card) 25'; Moi Delgado (yellow card) 65'	Stadium: Carlos Tartiere; Referee: Daniel Jesús Trujillo Suárez (Tenerife)
Note: The originally scheduled match was postponed due to the COVID-19 pandemic, and rescheduled. It was played behind closed doors.

20 July 2020 42	Elche	2–1	Oviedo	Elche
21:00 CEST	Jonathas 24' (yellow card) 44'; Dani Calvo (yellow card) 46'; Tekio (yellow card) 53'; Pere Milla 81'	Report	Lolo González 40' (yellow card) 67'; Carlos Hernández (yellow card) 42'; Edu Cortina (yellow card) 73'; Grippo (yellow card) 84'	Stadium: Martínez Valero; Referee: Álvaro Moreno Aragón (Andalusia)
Note: The originally scheduled match was postponed due to the COVID-19 pandemic, and rescheduled. It was played behind closed doors.

=== Copa del Rey ===
==== First round ====
18 December 2019	Badalona	3–1	Oviedo	Badalona
18:00 CET	Hugo Esteban 21'; Toni Jou (yellow card) 43'; Cris Montes (yellow card) 46' (goal) 55', 69'	Report	Lolo González (yellow card) 27'; Ibra 52'	Stadium: Municipal; Attendance: 735; Referee: Daniel Jesús Trujillo Suárez (Tenerife)
