= 2020–21 Real Oviedo season =

Real Oviedo
2020–21 season
- Owner: Grupo Carso
- President: Jorge Menéndez Vallina
- Head coach: José Ángel Ziganda
- Stadium: Carlos Tartiere
- Segunda División: 13th
- Copa del Rey: Second round
- Top goalscorer: League: Gustavo Blanco (7); All: Gustavo Blanco (7)
Home colours	Away colours

The 2020–21 Real Oviedo season was the club's 95th season in existence and the club's sixth consecutive season in the second division of Spanish football. In addition to the domestic league, Real Oviedo participated in this season's edition of the Copa del Rey. The season covered the period from 21 July 2020 to 30 June 2021.

== Players ==
=== First-team squad ===
As of 1 February 2021

Note: Flags indicate national team as defined under FIFA eligibility rules; some limited exceptions apply. Players may hold more than one non-FIFA nationality.

No.	Pos.	Nation	Player
1	GK	ESP	Joan Femenías
2	DF	SUI	Simone Grippo
3	DF	ESP	Alejandro Arribas (vice-captain)
4	DF	ESP	Edgar González (on loan from Real Betis)
6	DF	ESP	Carlos Hernández
7	DF	ISL	Diegui Johannesson
8	MF	ESP	Marco Sangalli
9	FW	ESP	Rodri
10	MF	ESP	Borja Sánchez
12	DF	ESP	Juanjo Nieto
13	GK	BRA	Gabriel Brazão (on loan from Inter Milan)

No.	Pos.	Nation	Player
14	MF	ESP	Jimmy
15	MF	ESP	Matías Nahuel (on loan from Tenerife)
16	FW	GHA	Samuel Obeng
17	MF	ESP	Viti Rozada
18	DF	ESP	Bolaño (captain)
20	MF	ESP	Sergio Tejera (vice-captain)
22	FW	ARG	Gustavo Blanco (on loan from Antalyaspor)
23	DF	ESP	Mossa
24	DF	ESP	Lucas Ahijado
25	FW	ESP	Borja Valle
28	MF	ESP	Javi Mier

=== Reserve team ===
Note: Flags indicate national team as defined under FIFA eligibility rules; some limited exceptions apply. Players may hold more than one non-FIFA nationality.

No.	Pos.	Nation	Player
27	MF	ESP	Ton Ripoll
29	FW	ESP	Javi Cueto

No.	Pos.	Nation	Player
31	MF	ESP	Joselu Guerra
34	GK	ESP	Berto Hórreo

=== On loan ===
Note: Flags indicate national team as defined under FIFA eligibility rules; some limited exceptions apply. Players may hold more than one non-FIFA nationality.

No.	Pos.	Nation	Player
—	MF	ESP	Riki Rodríguez (on loan to Racing Santander)

== Transfers ==
=== In ===
No.	Pos	Player	Transferred from	Fee	Date	Source
25	MF	(Spain) Borja Valle	(Romania) Dinamo București	Undisclosed	30 December 2020	

=== Out ===
No.	Pos	Player	Transferred to	Fee	Date	Source
23	FW	(Spain) Stoichkov	(Spain) Mallorca	Loan return	End of season	

== Pre-season and friendlies ==
Win Draw Loss

26 August 2020 Friendly	Celta Vigo	2–2	Oviedo	Vigo, Spain
18:00 CEST (UTC+2)				Stadium: Balaídos; Attendance: 0

29 August 2020 Friendly	Oviedo	0–0	Mirandés	Oviedo, Spain
18:00 CEST (UTC+2)				Stadium: Estadio Carlos Tartiere

4 September 2020 Friendly	Oviedo	2–2	Athletic Bilbao	Oviedo, Spain
12:00 CEST (UTC+2)	Capa 38' (o.g.); Obeng 60'		Zarraga 43'; Villalibre 56'	Stadium: Estadio Carlos Tartiere; Attendance: 0 Referee: Leandro Carbajales Gómez

5 September 2020 Friendly	Ponferradina	0–1	Oviedo	Ponferrada, Spain
19:30 CEST (UTC+2)				Stadium: Estadio El Toralín; Attendance: 0

== Competitions ==
=== Overview ===
Competition	First match	Last match	Starting round	Final position	Record							
Competition	First match	Last match	Starting round	Final position	Pld	W	D	L	GF	GA	GD	Win %
Segunda División	13 September 2020	29 May 2021	Matchday 1	13th	42	11	19	12	45	46	−1	26.19
Copa del Rey	15 December 2020	6 January 2021	First round	Second round	2	1	0	1	3	3	+0	50.00
Total					44	12	19	13	48	49	−1	27.27

Source: Soccerway

=== Segunda División ===
==== League table ====
Pos	Team	Pld	W	D	L	GF	GA	GD	Pts
11	Fuenlabrada	42	12	18	12	45	46	−1	54 (Note: Head-to-head points: Mirandés: 6, Fuenlabrada: 0)
12	Málaga	42	14	11	17	37	47	−10	53
13	Oviedo	42	11	19	12	45	46	−1	52 (Note: Head-to-head points: Oviedo: 4, Tenerife: 1)
14	Tenerife	42	13	13	16	36	36	0	52
15	Zaragoza	42	13	11	18	37	43	−6	50

Source: LaLiga
Rules for classification: 1) points; 2) head-to-head points; 3) head-to-head goal difference; 4) goal difference; 5) number of goals scored

==== Results summary ====
Overall								Home						Away					
Pld	W	D	L	GF	GA	GD	Pts	W	D	L	GF	GA	GD	W	D	L	GF	GA	GD
42	11	19	12	45	46	−1	52	7	8	6	26	22	+4	4	11	6	19	24	−5

Source: La Liga

==== Results by round ====
Round	1	2	3	4	5	6	7	8	9	10	11	12	13	14	15	16	17	18	19	20	21	22	23	24	25	26	27	28	29	30	31	32	33	34	35	36	37	38	39	40	41	42
Ground	H	A	H	A	H	A	H	A	H	A	H	A	H	A	H	H	A	H	A	H	A	A	H	A	H	A	H	A	H	A	H	A	A	H	A	H	A	H	H	A	H	A
Result	D	D	L	D	W	L	D	L	L	W	W	W	D	D	L	D	W	W	L	D	D	D	L	L	W	D	W	D	L	D	D	D	L	D	W	L	D	W	W	L	D	D
Position	11	13	16	16	14	16	15	19	20	17	16	12	14	13	14	15	14	11	13	14	12	12	15	16	14	15	11	11	13	14	14	14	14	15	14	14	14	13	10	12	12	13

Source: La Liga
A = Away; H = Home; W = Win; D = Draw; L = Loss

==== Matches ====
The league fixtures were announced on 31 August 2020.

13 September 2020 1	Oviedo	0–0	Cartagena	Oviedo
12:00 CEST (UTC+2)		Report		Stadium: Carlos Tartiere; Attendance: 0 (Note: The match was played behind closed doors due to the COVID-19 pandemic in Spain.); Referee: Javier Iglesias Villanueva

19 September 2020 2	Mirandés	1–1	Oviedo	Miranda de Ebro
16:00 CEST (UTC+2)	Martín 58'	Report	Sangalli 90+1'	Stadium: Estadio Municipal de Anduva; Attendance: 0 Referee: Iñaki Vicandi Garrido

27 September 2020 3	Oviedo	0–2	Espanyol	Oviedo
18:15 CEST (UTC+2)	Tejera (yellow card) 32'; Edgar (yellow card) 62'	Report	De Tomás 65' (pen.), 69'	Stadium: Carlos Tartiere; Attendance: 0 Referee: Gorka Sagués Oscoz

3 October 2020 4	Albacete	1–1	Oviedo	Albacete
18:15 CEST (UTC+2)	Gorosito (yellow card) 10'; Fuster (yellow card) 13'; Kecojević (yellow card) 19'; Diamanka 55'; Jiménez (yellow card) 74'; Azamoum (yellow card) 88'	Report	Arribas 11', (red card) 21'; Nieto (yellow card) 53' (yellow-red card) 64'; González (yellow card) 54'; Fernández (yellow card) 85'; Tejera (yellow card) 90+3'	Stadium: Carlos Belmonte; Attendance: 0 Referee: Rafael Sánchez López

11 October 2020 5	Oviedo	1–0	Sporting Gijón	Oviedo
21:30 CEST (UTC+2)	Tejera 38' (pen.); Fernández (yellow card) 87'; Mújica (yellow card) 90+3'; Femenías (yellow card) 90+5'	Report	Babin (yellow card) 28'; Manu García (yellow card) 66'	Stadium: Carlos Tartiere; Attendance: 0 Referee: Luis Mario Milla Alvéndiz

18 October 2020 6	Girona	1–0	Oviedo	Girona
20:30 CEST (UTC+2)	Monchu 67'	Report		Stadium: Montilivi; Attendance: 0 Referee: Daniel Jesús Trujillo Suárez

22 October 2020 7	Oviedo	0–0	Rayo Vallecano	Oviedo
19:00 CEST (UTC+2)		Report		Stadium: Carlos Tartiere; Attendance: 0 Referee: Alejandro Muñiz Ruiz

25 October 2020 8	Leganés	2–1	Oviedo	Leganés
18:15 CET (UTC+1)	Shibasaki 61'; Bastón 87'	Report	Johannesson (yellow card) 6'; Fernández (yellow card) 38'; Obeng 90+3'	Stadium: Estadio Municipal de Butarque; Attendance: 0 Referee: Dámaso Arcediano Monescillo

28 October 2020 9	Oviedo	2–3	UD Logroñés	Oviedo
21:30 CET (UTC+1)	Bobadilla 5' (o.g.); Obeng 56'	Report	Acevedo 48', 50'; González 71'	Stadium: Carlos Tartiere; Attendance: 0 Referee: Iosu Galech Apezteguía

31 October 2020 10	Las Palmas	1–2	Oviedo	Las Palmas
18:15 CET (UTC+1)	Lemos (yellow card) 62'; Suárez 88'	Report	Fernández (yellow card) 15'; Nahuel 19', 21'; González (yellow card) 48'; Hernández (yellow card) 52'; Mier (yellow card) 89'	Stadium: Estadio Gran Canaria; Attendance: 0 Referee: Miguel Ángel Ortiz Arias

8 November 2020 11	Oviedo	4–0	Castellón	Oviedo
18:15 CET (UTC+1)	Sangalli 10'; Sánchez 46'; González 53', 84'; Arribas (yellow card) 83'	Report	Sánchez (yellow card) 33'; Cubillas (yellow card) 87'	Stadium: Carlos Tartiere; Attendance: 0 Referee: José Antonio López Toca

13 November 2020 12	Zaragoza	1–2	Oviedo	Zaragoza
21:00 CET (UTC+1)	Fernández 26' (o.g.)	Report	Sánchez 45'; Leschuk 49'	Stadium: La Romareda; Attendance: 0 Referee: Rubén Ávalos Barrera

21 November 2020 13	Oviedo	1–1	Fuenlabrada	Oviedo
20:30 CET (UTC+1)		Report		Stadium: Carlos Tartiere; Attendance: 0 Referee: Dámaso Arcediano Monescillo

24 November 2020 14	Lugo	0–0	Oviedo	Lugo
21:30 CET (UTC+1)		Report		Stadium: Anxo Carro; Attendance: 0 Referee: Eduardo Prieto Iglesias

30 November 2020 15	Oviedo	1–2	Almería	Oviedo
21:00 CET (UTC+1)	Blanco 65'; Arribas (yellow card) 74'; Nieto (yellow card) 74'; Sánchez (yellow card) 86'	Report	Corpas 27' (pen.), 79'; Costa (yellow card) 57'; Akieme (yellow card) 90+2'; Lazo (yellow card) 90+4'	Stadium: Carlos Tartiere; Attendance: 0 Referee: David Gálvez Rascón

3 December 2020 16	Oviedo	1–1	Alcorcón	Oviedo
19:00 CET (UTC+1)	Sánchez (yellow card) 26'; Blanco (yellow card) 41'; Fernández (yellow card) 45'; Teguia (yellow card) 87'; Sangalli (yellow card) 89', (goal) 90+1'	Report	León (yellow card) 50'; Fraile 88' (pen.)	Stadium: Carlos Tartiere; Attendance: 0 Referee: Rafael Sánchez López

6 December 2020 17	Sabadell	0–1	Oviedo	Sabadell
20:30 CET (UTC+1)		Report	Sangalli 65'	Stadium: Estadi de la Nova Creu Alta; Attendance: 0 Referee: Aitor Gorostegui Fernández-Ortega

11 December 2020 18	Oviedo	4–2	Tenerife	Oviedo
21:00 CET (UTC+1)	Blanco 4', 8'; Rodri 66'; Sánchez 79'	Report	Bermejo 16'; Ruiz 64'	Stadium: Carlos Tartiere; Attendance: 0 Referee: Saúl Ais Reig

18 December 2020 19	Ponferradina	1–0	Oviedo	Ponferrada
19:00 CET (UTC+1)	Yuri 15', (penalty missed) 88'	Report	Sangalli (yellow card) 90'; González (yellow card) 90+2'	Stadium: El Toralín; Attendance: 0 Referee: Iñaki Vicandi Garrido

3 January 2021 20	Oviedo	2–2	Mallorca	Oviedo
21:00 CET (UTC+2)	Mier 44'; Arribas 68'	Report	Junior 15'; Sastre 20'; Prats (yellow card) 73'; De Galarreta (yellow card) 82'	Stadium: Carlos Tartiere; Attendance: 0 Referee: Daniel Jesús Trujillo Suárez

9 January 2021 21	Málaga	1–1	Oviedo	Málaga
18:15 CET (UTC+1)	Rahmani 13'	Report	Nahuel 51'	Stadium: La Rosaleda; Attendance: 0 Referee: David Gálvez Rascón

24 January 2021 22	UD Logroñés	0–0	Oviedo	Logroño
16:00 CET (UTC+1)		Report		Stadium: Las Gaunas; Attendance: 0 Referee: Francisco José Hernández Maeso

30 January 2021 23	Oviedo	0–1	Albacete	Oviedo
16:00 CET (UTC+1)	Mier (yellow card) 35'; Tejera (yellow card) 73'	Report	Zozulya 58', (yellow card) 90+2'; Boyomo (yellow card) 90+6'; Gorosito (yellow card) 90+7'	Stadium: Carlos Tartiere; Attendance: 0 Referee: Aitor Gorostegui Fernández Ortega

6 February 2021 24	Cartagena	2–0	Oviedo	Cartagena
16:00 CET (UTC+1)	Castro 33'; Cayarga 71'	Report		Stadium: Cartagonova; Attendance: 0 Referee: Juan Luis Pulido Santana

15 February 2021 25	Oviedo	3–1	Lugo	Oviedo
21:00 CET (UTC+1)	Tejera 28' (pen.); Fernández 63'; Nieto 88'	Report	Rodríguez 13'	Stadium: Carlos Tartiere; Attendance: 0 Referee: Saúl Ais Reig

22 February 2021 26	Fuenlabrada	2–2	Oviedo	Fuenlabrada
19:00 CET (UTC+1)	Diéguez 69'; Garcés 87'	Report	Sangalli 14'; Pulido 86' (o.g.)	Stadium: Fernando Torres; Attendance: 0 Referee: Iosu Galech Apezteguía

28 February 2021 27	Oviedo	1–0	Zaragoza	Oviedo
21:00 CET (UTC+1)	Grippo (yellow card) 17'; Rodri 53'	Report	Igbekeme (yellow card) 75'; Francés (yellow card) 82'; Fernández (yellow card) 90+1'; Eguaras (yellow card) 90+6'	Stadium: Estadio Carlos Tartiere; Attendance: 0 Referee: Óliver de la Fuente Ramos

5 March 2021 28	Espanyol	1–1	Oviedo	Cornellà de Llobregat
21:00 CET (UTC+1)	Melendo 9'; Vilà (red card) 38'; De Tomás (yellow card) 46'	Report	Ahijado (yellow card) 53'; Nahuel 67'; Sangalli (yellow card) 78'; Grippo (yellow card) 83'	Stadium: RCDE Stadium; Attendance: 0 Referee: Daniel Jesús Trujillo Suárez

14 March 2021 29	Oviedo	1–3	Leganés	Oviedo
20:30 CET (UTC+1)	Tejera 53' (pen.)	Report	Hernández 12', 48'; Bua 90+5'	Stadium: Carlos Tartiere; Attendance: 0 Referee: Dámaso Arcediano Monescillo

20 March 2021 30	Mallorca	0–0	Oviedo	Palma
18:15 CET (UTC+1)	Mollejo (yellow card) 31'; Valjent (yellow card) 90+1'	Report	Tejera (yellow card) 29'	Stadium: Visit Mallorca Stadium; Attendance: 0 Referee: Gorka Sagués Oscoz

27 March 2021 31	Oviedo	1–1	Ponferradina	Oviedo
16:00 CET (UTC+1)	González 40'	Report	Aguza 2'	Stadium: Carlos Tartiere; Attendance: 0 Referee: Iñaki Vicandi Garrido

30 March 2021 32	Alcorcón	1–1	Oviedo	Alcorcón
19:00 CEST (UTC+2)	Nwakali 2'	Report	Blanco 84'	Stadium: Santo Domingo; Attendance: 0 Referee: Daniel Ocón Arráiz

3 April 2021 33	Castellón	1–0	Oviedo	Castellón de la Plana
18:15 CEST (UTC+2)	Arribas 67' (o.g.)	Report		Stadium: Nou Estadi Castàlia; Attendance: 0 Referee: Óliver de la Fuente Ramos

10 April 2021 34	Oviedo	0–0	Las Palmas	Oviedo
16:00 CEST (UTC+2)	Tejera (yellow card) 12'; Fernández (yellow card) 71'; Arribas (yellow card) 75'	Report	Clemente (yellow card) 23'; Lemos (yellow card) 66'; Jesé (red card) 66'; Mesa (yellow card) 70'	Stadium: Carlos Tartiere; Attendance: 0 Referee: Francisco José Hernández Maeso

17 April 2021 35	Sporting Gijón	0–1	Oviedo	Gijón
18:15 CEST (UTC+2)	Babin (yellow card) 79'	Report	Johannesson 6'; Arribas (yellow card) 9'; Ahijado (yellow card) 52'	Stadium: El Molinón; Attendance: 0 Referee: Miguel Ángel Ortiz Arias

25 April 2021 36	Oviedo	0–1	Girona	Oviedo
14:00 CEST (UTC+2)		Report	Bárcenas 63'	Stadium: Carlos Tartiere; Attendance: 0 Referee: Gorka Sagués Oscoz

1 May 2021 37	Almería	2–2	Oviedo	Almería
18:15 CEST (UTC+2)	Corpas (penalty missed) 17'; Sadiq 22' (pen.), 30'	Report	Obeng 54'; Grippo 83'	Stadium: Estadio de los Juegos Mediterráneos; Attendance: 0 Referee: Saúl Ais Reig

9 May 2021 38	Oviedo	2–1	Sabadell	Oviedo
16:00 CEST (UTC+2)	Rodri 16'; Nahuel 39'	Report	Rubio 38'	Stadium: Carlos Tartiere; Attendance: 0 Referee: Daniel Ocón Arráiz

17 May 2021 39	Oviedo	1–0	Málaga	Oviedo
19:00 CEST (UTC+2)	Ahijado 61'	Report		Stadium: Carlos Tartiere; Attendance: 0 Referee: Óliver de la Fuente Ramos

20 May 2021 40	Rayo Vallecano	4–1	Oviedo	Madrid
21:30 CEST (UTC+2)	Comesaña 8'; Saveljich (yellow card) 35'; Isi 38'; Qasmi 45+2' (pen.); Valentín (yellow card) 69'; Ahijado 70' (o.g.)	Report	Blanco 27'; González (yellow card) 57'	Stadium: Vallecas; Attendance: 0 Referee: Iosu Galech Apezteguía

24 May 2021 41	Oviedo	1–1	Mirandés	Oviedo
18:30 CEST (UTC+2)	Tejera 4', (yellow card) 47'; González (yellow card) 30'; Rodri (yellow card) 61'	Report	Djouahra 54'; Meseguer (yellow card) 75'	Stadium: Carlos Tartiere; Attendance: 0 Referee: Iñaki Vicandi Garrido

29 May 2021 42	Tenerife	2–2	Oviedo	Santa Cruz de Tenerife
18:30 CEST (UTC+2)	Sol 51' (pen.); Santana 77' (pen.)	Report	Sánchez 7'; Blanco 90+3'	Stadium: Heliodoro Rodríguez López; Attendance: 0 Referee: Daniel Ocón Arráiz

=== Copa del Rey ===
15 December 2020 First round	Coria	2–3	Oviedo	Coria del Río
20:30 CET (UTC+1)	Fernández 17'; Mahíllo 56'	Report	Rozada 41'; Mújica 43', 77'	Stadium: La Isla; Referee: Luis Mario Milla Alvendiz

6 January 2021 Second round	Málaga	1–0 (a.e.t.)	Oviedo	Málaga
21:00 CET (UTC+1)	Chavarría 118'	Report		Stadium: La Rosaleda; Referee: Juan Luis Pulido Santana
