= Samuel Obeng (footballer) =

Ghanaian footballer (born 1997)

Personal information
- Full name: Samuel Obeng Gyabaa
- Date of birth: 15 May 1997 (age 29)
- Place of birth: Nsapor, Ghana
- Height: 1.83 m (6 ft 0 in)
- Position: Forward

Team information
- Current team: Albacete
- Number: 20

Youth career
- Gurb
- 2014–2015: Manlleu
- 2015–2016: Getafe

Senior career*
Years	Team	Apps	(Gls)
2016–2018	Girona B	29	(5)
2017–2018	→ Granollers (loan)	30	(10)
2018–2019	Calahorra	28	(7)
2019–2020	Oviedo B	13	(4)
2019–2024	Oviedo	109	(15)
2023–2024	→ Huesca (loan)	55	(11)
2024–2025	Casa Pia	11	(1)
2025	Wydad	11	(2)
2025–2026	Ceuta	8	(1)
2026–	Albacete	19	(3)

International career^{‡}
2019	Ghana U23	5	(2)
- * Club domestic league appearances and goals as of 9 June 2026 ‡ National team caps and goals as of 22 November 2019

Samuel Obeng Gyabaa (born 15 May 1997) is a Ghanaian footballer who plays as a forward for Spanish club Albacete Balompié.

== Club career ==
Born in Nsapor, Brong-Ahafo Region, Obeng moved to Gurb, Barcelona, Catalonia at the age of ten. After finishing his formation with Getafe CF, he made his senior debut with Girona FC B in the regional leagues, in 2016.

In 2017, Obeng was loaned to Tercera División side EC Granollers for one year. On 5 August of the following year, he signed for Segunda División B side CD Calahorra after a trial period.

In March 2019, Obeng agreed a pre-contract with Real Oviedo, effective as of 1 July; he was initially assigned to the reserves in the third division. He made his first-team debut on 18 August: after coming on as a second-half substitute for Edu Cortina, he scored his team's second in a 2–3 away loss against Deportivo de La Coruña in the Segunda División.

On 16 August 2020, Obeng renewed his contract until 2023 and was definitely promoted to the main squad. In January 2023, he moved to fellow second division side SD Huesca on loan until the end of the season; his loan was extended for another year on 20 July.

On 7 August 2024, Obeng terminated his link with the Carbayones, and joined Portuguese side Casa Pia AC two days later. In February 2025, he signed for Moroccan side Wydad AC.

On 1 September 2025, Obeng returned to Spain after joining second division side AD Ceuta FC. He left the club the following 13 January, and signed an 18-month deal with fellow league team Albacete Balompié just hours later.

== Career statistics ==
As of match played on 18 November 2023

Club statistics
Club	Season	League			National Cup		Continental		Other		Total	
Club	Season	Division	Apps	Goals	Apps	Goals	Apps	Goals	Apps	Goals	Apps	Goals
Calahorra	2018–19	Segunda División B	28	7	1	0	—		—		29	7
Oviedo B	2019–20	Segunda División B	13	4	0	0	—		—		13	4
Oviedo	2019–20	Segunda División	17	3	1	0	—		—		18	3
Oviedo	2020–21	Segunda División	36	3	2	0	—		—		38	3
Oviedo	2021–22	Segunda División	34	8	1	0	—		—		35	8
Oviedo	2022–23	Segunda División	22	1	3	0	—		—		25	1
Oviedo	Total		109	15	7	0	0	0	0	0	116	15
Huesca (loan)	2022–23	Segunda División	17	5	0	0	—		—		17	5
Huesca (loan)	2023–24	Segunda División	15	3	0	0	—		—		15	3
Huesca (loan)	Total		32	8	0	0	0	0	0	0	32	8
Career totals			182	34	8	0	0	0	0	0	190	34
