= Javi Cueto =

Spanish footballer

Personal information
- Full name: Javier Cueto Suárez
- Date of birth: 11 January 2001 (age 25)
- Place of birth: Gijón, Spain
- Height: 1.76 m (5 ft 9 in)
- Position: Forward

Team information
- Current team: Sloga Doboj
- Number: 9

Youth career
- San Fernando
- Arroyo
- Caudal
- 2016–2018: Oviedo

Senior career*
Years	Team	Apps	(Gls)
2018–2022	Oviedo B	88	(32)
2020–2022	Oviedo	2	(0)
2022–2023	→ Atlético Madrid B (loan)	22	(6)
2023–2024	Algeciras	34	(4)
2024–2026	Avilés Industrial	54	(19)
2026–	Sloga Doboj	7	(0)

International career
2018	Spain U18	2	(1)
- * Club domestic league appearances and goals as of 20 September 2026

Javier "Javi" Cueto Suárez (born 11 January 2001) is a Spanish footballer who plays as a forward for Bosnian Premier League club Sloga Doboj.

== Club career ==
Born in Gijón, Asturias, Cueto joined Real Oviedo's youth setup in 2016, from Caudal Deportivo. He made his senior debut with the reserves on 20 October 2018, coming on as a second-half substitute for Edu Cortina in a 2–1 Segunda División B away win against SD Amorebieta.

Cueto scored his first senior goal on 5 May 2019, netting the opener in a 1–1 draw at CD Izarra. On 31 July 2020, he renewed his contract with the club.

Cueto made his professional debut on 19 September 2020, replacing Borja Sánchez in a 1–1 away draw against CD Mirandés in the Segunda División.

On 15 July 2022, Cueto was loaned to Segunda Federación side Atlético Madrid B, for one year.

On 19 August 2024, Cueto signed with Avilés Industrial in the fourth tier.

== Career statistics ==
As of match played 20 September 2026

Appearances and goals by club, season and competition
Club	Season	League			National cup (Note: Includes Copa del Rey)		Other		Total	
Club	Season	Division	Apps	Goals	Apps	Goals	Apps	Goals	Apps	Goals
Real Oviedo Vetusta	2018–19	Segunda División B	10	2	—		—		10	2
Real Oviedo Vetusta	2019–20	Segunda División B	24	1	—		—		24	1
Real Oviedo Vetusta	2020–21	Segunda División B	25	8	—		—		25	8
Real Oviedo Vetusta	Total		59	11	—		—		59	11
Real Oviedo	2020–21	Segunda División	1	0	—		—		1	0
Real Oviedo	2021–22	Segunda División	1	0	—		—		1	0
Real Oviedo	Total		2	0	—		—		2	0
Atlético Madrid B (loan)	2022–23	Segunda Federación	22	6	—		1 (Note: Appearance in the 2023 Segunda Federación play-offs)	0	23	6
Algeciras	2023–24	Primera Federación	34	4	—		—		34	4
Real Avilés	2024–25	Segunda Federación	28	10	—		4 (Note: Appearances in the 2025 Segunda Federación play-offs)	3	32	13
Real Avilés	2025–26	Primera Federación	26	9	1	0	—		27	9
Real Avilés	Total		54	19	1	0	4	3	59	22
Sloga Meridian	2026–27	Bosnian Premier League	7	0	0	0	—		7	0
Career total			178	40	1	0	5	3	184	43
