= Javi Mier =

Spanish footballer (born 1999)

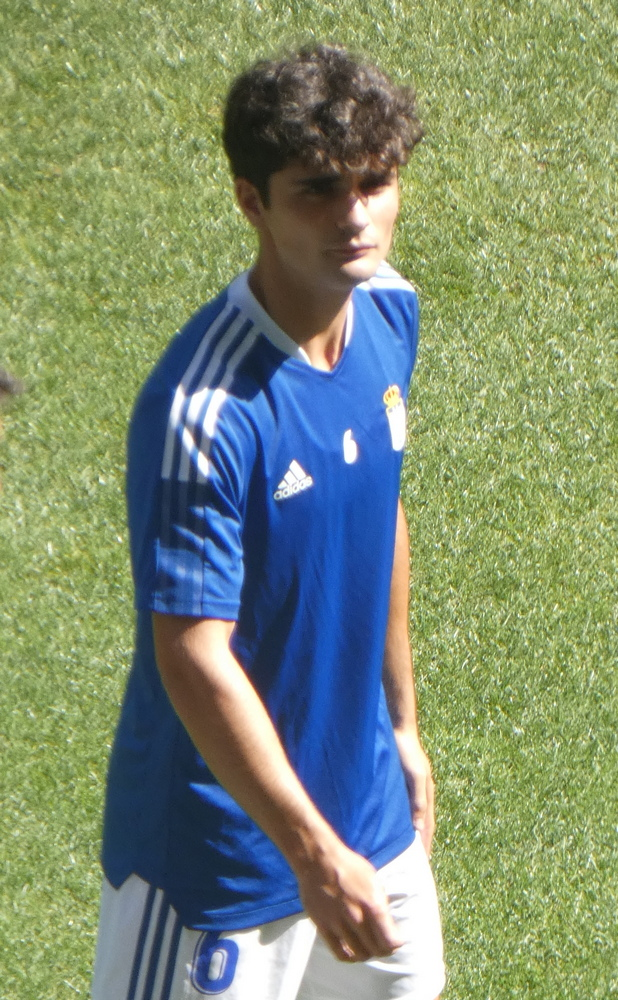
- Mier with Real Oviedo in 2021

Personal information
- Full name: Javier Mier Martínez
- Date of birth: 4 February 1999 (age 27)
- Place of birth: Oviedo, Spain
- Height: 1.76 m (5 ft 9 in)
- Position: Midfielder

Team information
- Current team: Murcia

Youth career
- 2014–2017: Oviedo

Senior career*
Years	Team	Apps	(Gls)
2017–2020	Oviedo B	91	(8)
2020–2023	Oviedo	62	(3)
2023–2026	Huesca	60	(3)
2026–	Murcia	0	(0)

International career
2014–2015	Spain U16	5	(0)
- * Club domestic league appearances and goals as of 9 June 2026

Javier "Javi" Mier Martínez (born 3 February 1999) is a Spanish footballer who plays as a central midfielder for Real Murcia CF.

== Club career ==
Born in Oviedo, Asturias, Mier was a Real Oviedo youth graduate. He made his senior debut with the reserves on 2 September 2017, starting in a 1–0 Tercera División away win against TSK Roces.

Mier scored his first senior goal on 13 May 2018, netting his side's only in a 1–2 loss at CD Llanes. He contributed with one goal in 14 appearances, as the B-side returned to Segunda División B after 16 years.

Mier made his first team debut on 5 January 2020, starting in a 1–1 home draw against Málaga CF in the Segunda División. He scored his first professional goal on 3 January 2021, netting his team's first in a 2–2 home draw against RCD Mallorca.

On 1 September 2023, Mier terminated his contract with Oviedo, and signed for fellow second division side SD Huesca the following day.

On 23 June 2026, after Huesca's relegation, Mier joined Primera Federación side Real Murcia CF.

== International career ==
Mier is a youth international for Spain, representing the under-16s in 2014.

== Personal life ==
Mier's twin brother Jorge is also a footballer who plays as a midfielder. Their older brother, Tato, was also an Oviedo youth graduate.

== Career statistics ==
=== Club ===
As of match played 14 March 2021

Appearances and goals by club, season and competition
Club	Season	League			National Cup		Other		Total	
Club	Season	Division	Apps	Goals	Apps	Goals	Apps	Goals	Apps	Goals
Oviedo B	2017–18	Tercera División	11	1	—		—		11	1
Oviedo B	2018–19	Segunda División B	28	2	—		—		28	2
Oviedo B	2019–20	Segunda División B	23	3	—		—		23	3
Oviedo B	2020–21	Segunda División B	0	0	—		—		0	0
Oviedo B	Total		62	6	0	0	0	0	62	6
Oviedo	2018–19	Segunda División	0	0	0	0	—		0	0
Oviedo	2019–20	Segunda División	1	0	0	0	—		1	0
Oviedo	2020–21	Segunda División	22	1	2	0	—		24	1
Oviedo	Total		23	1	2	0	0	0	25	1
Career total			74	6	2	0	0	0	87	1
