= Luismi (footballer, born 1992) =

Spanish footballer

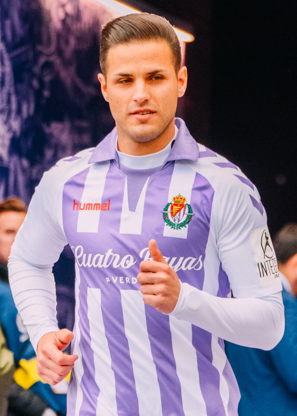
- Luismi with Valladolid in 2019

Personal information
- Full name: Luis Miguel Sánchez Benítez
- Date of birth: 5 May 1992 (age 34)
- Place of birth: Puerto Serrano, Spain
- Height: 1.80 m (5 ft 11 in)
- Position: Defensive midfielder

Youth career
- Sevilla

Senior career*
Years	Team	Apps	(Gls)
2011–2012	Sevilla C	27	(0)
2012–2015	Sevilla B	72	(0)
2014–2016	Sevilla	1	(0)
2016–2020	Valladolid	33	(3)
2017	→ Gimnàstic (loan)	14	(1)
2020	→ Oviedo (loan)	19	(1)
2020–2021	Elche	11	(0)
2021–2024	Oviedo	83	(2)
2024–2026	Málaga	31	(0)
Total		291	(7)
- * Club domestic league appearances and goals

Luis Miguel Sánchez Benítez (born 5 May 1992), known as Luismi, is a Spanish former professional footballer who played as a defensive midfielder.

== Club career ==
=== Sevilla ===
Born in Puerto Serrano, Cádiz, Andalusia, Luismi graduated from Sevilla FC's youth setup, making his debut as a senior with the C side in the Tercera División. In July 2012, he signed his first professional contract, also being promoted to the reserves in the Segunda División B.

On 11 November 2012, Luismi broke two bones in his skull in the dying minutes of a 1–0 home win over Real Jaén, only returning to action on 31 March of the following year, against the same club. On 1 February 2014, he was called up by manager Unai Emery for a La Liga match against Málaga CF as a replacement for Cardiff City-bound Cala, also being selected to the game against UD Almería on 8 March but remaining on the bench on both occasions.

Luismi penned a new two-year deal with the Andalusians on 3 July 2014, being also an unused substitute in the 2014 UEFA Super Cup 2–0 loss to Real Madrid at Cardiff City Stadium on 12 August. He made his first-team – and top division – debut on 23 August, replacing Vicente Iborra in the 80th minute of a 1–1 home draw against Valencia CF.

On 30 July 2015, Luismi agreed to an extension, being definitely promoted to the main squad and being assigned the number 16. The jersey, worn by Antonio Puerta when he died playing for Sevilla in 2007, was only to be given to products of the club's academy from that moment onwards; halfway through the campaign, however, he was stripped of the number when it was controversially handed to Argentine Federico Fazio.

=== Valladolid ===
After turning down an offer to play for the reserves in Segunda División, Luismi signed a two-year contract at Real Valladolid on 29 June 2016. On 29 December, having been rarely used, he was loaned to Gimnàstic de Tarragona also of the second tier. He scored in his second appearance for the latter on 14 January 2017, opening a 1–1 draw at UCAM Murcia CF.

Luismi returned to the Estadio José Zorrilla ahead of 2017–18, being a regular starter in an eventual top-flight promotion. On 15 January 2020, however, after failing to feature in any league matches over two seasons (due to injury), he was loaned to Real Oviedo of division two until June.

=== Elche ===
On 25 September 2020, Luismi agreed to a two-year contract with Elche CF, recently promoted to the top tier. He only started twice in his only season, as the club narrowly avoided relegation.

=== Oviedo ===
On 16 August 2021, Luismi returned to Oviedo as a free agent on a two-year deal. An habitual starter, he featured sparingly in the 2023–24 campaign while dealing with several injury problems.

Luismi left in July 2024.

=== Málaga ===
On 19 July 2024, Luismi signed a two-year contract with Málaga CF also in the second division. He suffered a serious facial injury in August 2025, which led to his retirement one year later aged 34.

== Career statistics ==
As of match played 7 May 2021

Appearances and goals by club, season and competition
Club	Season	League			National Cup		Total	
Club	Season	Division	Apps	Goals	Apps	Goals	Apps	Goals
Sevilla C	2011–12	Tercera División	27	0	—		27	0
Sevilla B	2012–13	Segunda División B	15	0	—		15	0
Sevilla B	2013–14	Segunda División B	27	0	—		27	0
Sevilla B	2014–15	Segunda División B	30	0	—		30	0
Sevilla B	Total		72	0	0	0	72	0
Sevilla	2013–14	La Liga	0	0	0	0	0	0
Sevilla	2014–15	La Liga	1	0	0	0	1	0
Sevilla	2015–16	La Liga	0	0	2	0	2	0
Sevilla	Total		1	0	2	0	3	0
Valladolid	2016–17	Segunda División	4	0	3	0	7	0
Valladolid	2017–18	Segunda División	29	3	1	0	30	3
Valladolid	2018–19	La Liga	0	0	2	0	2	0
Valladolid	2019–20	La Liga	0	0	1	0	1	0
Valladolid	2020–21	La Liga	0	0	0	0	0	0
Valladolid	Total		33	3	7	0	40	3
Gimnàstic (loan)	2016–17	Segunda División	14	1	0	0	14	1
Oviedo (loan)	2019–20	Segunda División	19	1	0	0	19	1
Elche	2020–21	La Liga	11	0	2	0	13	0
Career total			177	5	11	0	188	5
