= Carlos Tartiere =

Spanish businessman and president of Real Oviedo

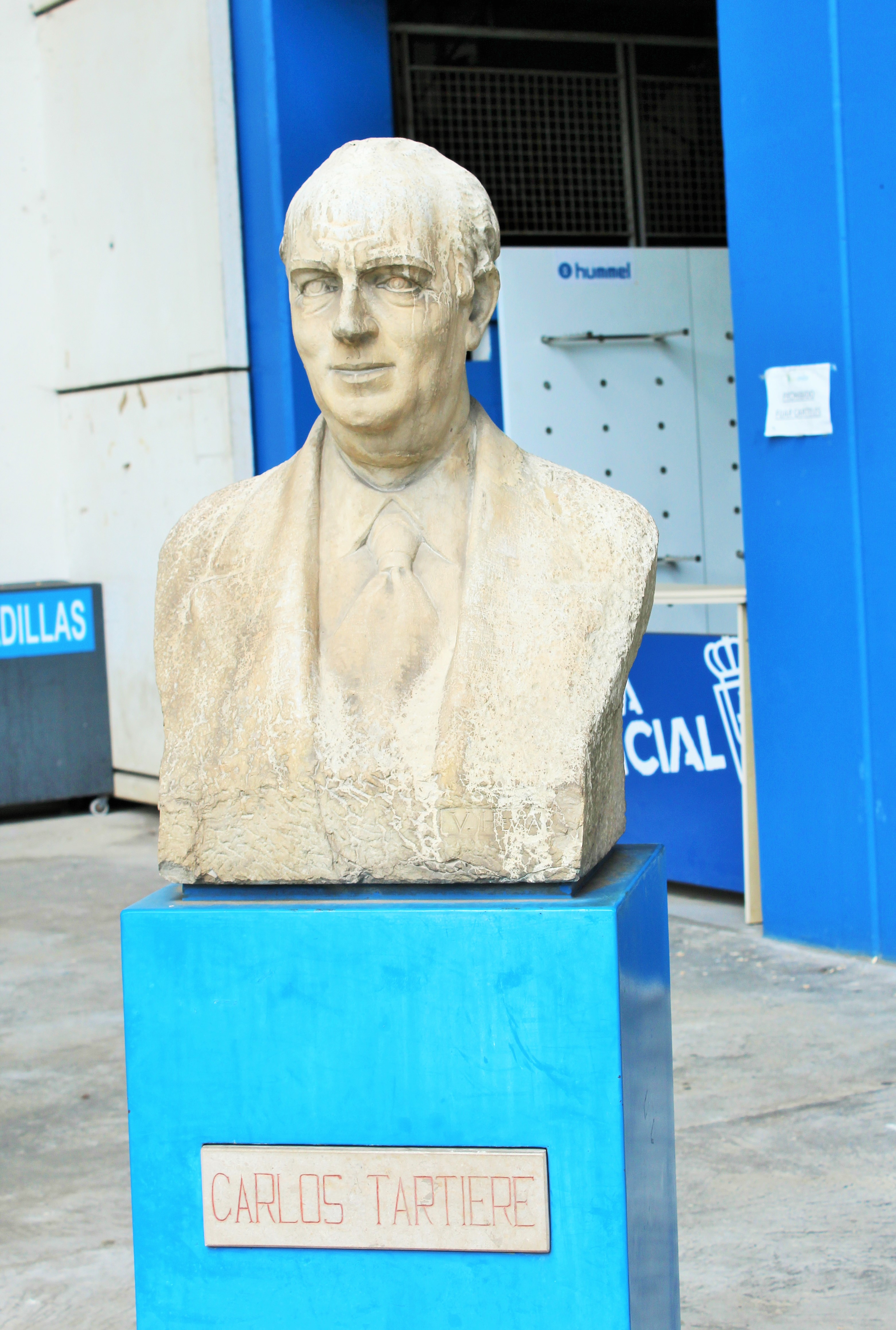
- Bust of Carlos Tartiere at Estadio Carlos Tartiere
- Born: Carlos Tartiere Alas-Pumariño; 1900; Lugones, Spain
- Died: 31 July 1950 (aged 49–50); Gijón, Spain
- Occupation: Businessman
- Known for: President of Real Oviedo

Carlos Tartiere Alas-Pumariño (1900 – 31 July 1950) was a Spanish businessman who served as the first president of Spanish club Real Oviedo.

== Biography ==
Tartiere was born in Lugones, Asturias, in 1900. He was the son of José Tartiere, an industrial engineer of French descent, and María de los Dolores de las Alas-Pumariño, the sister of conservative politician and writer Nicanor de las Alas Pumariño.

His father played a pivotal role in the establishment of Real Club Deportivo Oviedo. On March 26, 1926, he successfully promoted the merger of the former with Real Stadium Club Ovetense, forming Real Oviedo. He became the first president of the newly formed club, a position he held until his death from leukemia on July 31, 1950.

During his presidency, Real Oviedo became the first Asturian club to achieve promotion to Primera División, by achieving the Segunda División, followed by securing two third-place finishes in the top tier during the 1934–35 and 1935–36 seasons. In his honor, the old stadium in Buenavista was renamed Estadio Carlos Tartiere on 22 June 1958, a name that was retained for the new stadium, Estadio Municipal Carlos Tartiere.
