= Estadio Carlos Tartiere (1932) =

Former stadium at Oviedo, Spain

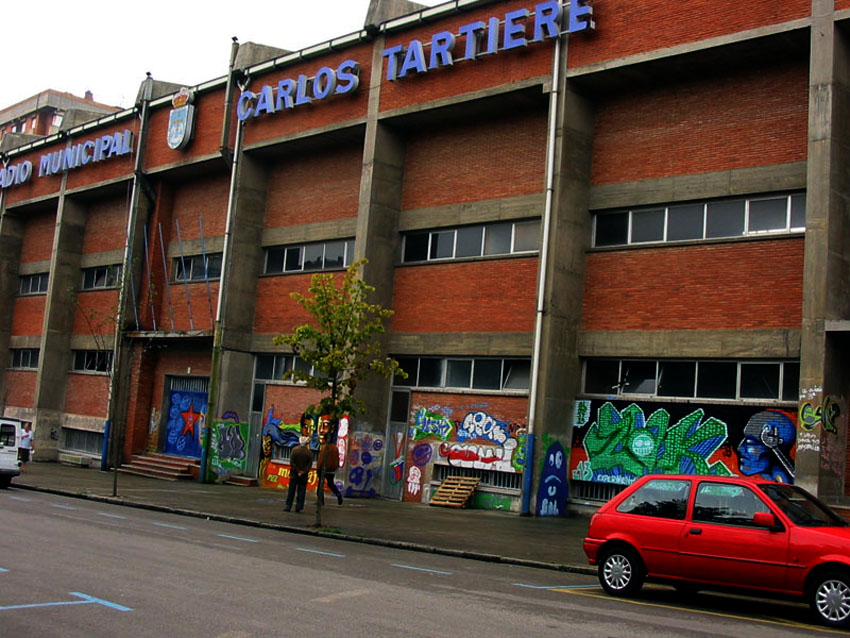
- The stadium in 2002
- Interactive map of Estadio Carlos Tartiere
- Full name: Estadio Carlos Tartiere
- Former names: Estadio de Buenavista (1932–1958)
- Location: Oviedo, Spain
- Coordinates: 43°21′28.48″N 5°51′38.95″W
- Owner: Ayuntamiento de Oviedo
- Operator: Real Oviedo
- Capacity: 22,000 (1932–1982); 23,500 (1982–1998); 16,500 (1998–2003)
- Surface: Grass

Construction
- Opened: April 24, 1932
- Renovated: 1982
- Closed: May 20, 2000
- Demolished: 2003
- Architect: Ildefonso Sánchez del Río

Tenant
- Real Oviedo (1932–2000)

Estadio Carlos Tartiere was a multi-use stadium in Oviedo, Spain. It was initially used as the stadium of Real Oviedo matches. It was replaced by the New Carlos Tartiere in 2000.

== History ==
Originally known as Buenavista stadium, named after the neighbourhood, it was inaugurated on April 24, 1932 with a match between the national teams of Spain and Yugoslavia. The first goal in this stadium was scored by Real Oviedo's forward Isidro Lángara.

The stadium was dedicated to the memory of the first president and founder of Real Oviedo, Carlos Tartiere in 1958.

It was completely rebuilt for the 1982 FIFA World Cup. It hosted three matches.

Pop superstar Michael Jackson performed at the stadium during his Dangerous World Tour on September 21, 1992 in front of 25,000 people. Guitarist Slash made a special appearance during the show on "Black or White".

The last match played in this stadium took place on May 20, 2000 and it was a Primera División match against Real Sociedad.

The capacity of the stadium was initially 22,500, but it was reduced to 16,500 in 1998 when the stadium became all-seater. This was the reason to build a new stadium.

It was replaced by the current Estadio Carlos Tartiere in 2000 and was eventually demolished in 2003.

== 1982 FIFA World Cup ==
The stadium hosted three games in the 1982 FIFA World Cup:

| Date | Team #1 | Res. | Team #2 | Round | Attendance |
|---|---|---|---|---|---|
| 1982-06-17 | Chile | 0–1 | Austria | Group 2 (first round) | 22,500 |
| 1982-06-21 | Algeria | 0–2 | Austria | Group 2 (first round) | 22,000 |
| 1982-06-24 | Algeria | 3–2 | Chile | Group 2 (first round) | 16,000 |
