= Yoel Bárcenas =

Panamanian footballer (born 1993)

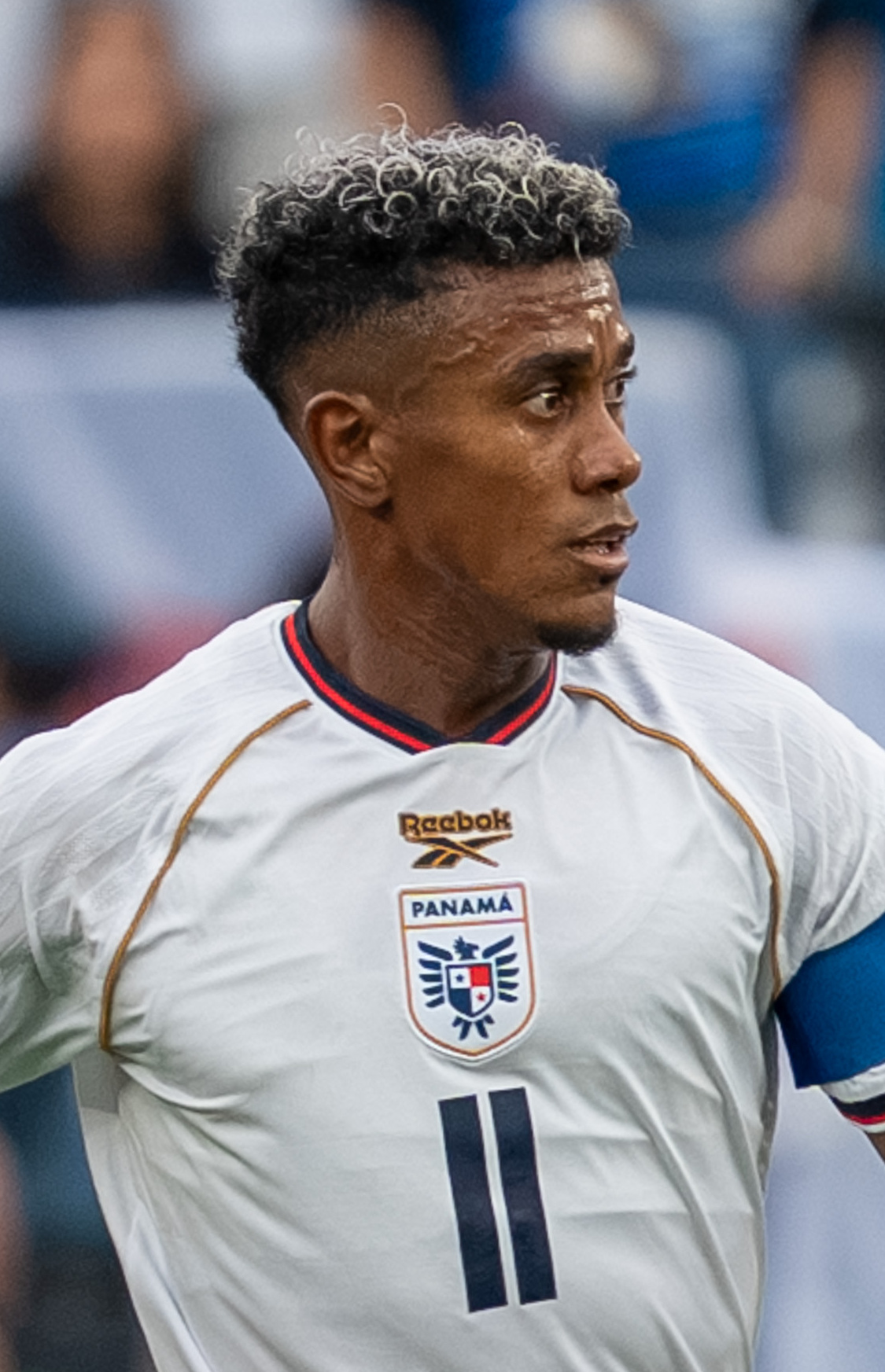
- Bárcenas with Panama in 2026

Personal information
- Full name: Édgar Yoel Bárcenas Herrera
- Date of birth: 23 October 1993 (age 33)
- Place of birth: Colón, Panama
- Height: 1.75 m (5 ft 9 in)
- Position: Winger

Team information
- Current team: Iraklis
- Number: 10

Youth career
- Árabe Unido

Senior career*
Years	Team	Apps	(Gls)
2012–2017	Árabe Unido	96	(16)
2016	→ RNK Split (loan)	8	(0)
2017–2018	→ Cafetaleros (loan)	45	(12)
2018–2022	Tijuana	0	(0)
2018–2020	→ Oviedo (loan)	70	(14)
2020–2021	→ Girona (loan)	36	(3)
2021–2022	→ Leganés (loan)	26	(2)
2022–2026	Mazatlán	105	(6)
2026–	Iraklis	1	(1)

International career^{‡}
2015	Panama U22	5	(0)
2015	Panama U23	1	(0)
2014–	Panama	107	(10)
Medal record
Men's football
Representing Panama
CONCACAF Gold Cup
Runner-up	2023 United States–Canada	Team
- * Club domestic league appearances and goals as of 8 September 2026 ‡ National team caps and goals as of 27 June 2026 (UTC)

Édgar Yoel Bárcenas Herrera (born 23 October 1993) is a Panamanian professional footballer who plays as a winger for Super League club Iraklis and the Panama national team.

== Club career ==
Born in Colón, Bárcenas made his senior debut with hometown side Árabe Unido on 29 July 2012, coming on as a substitute in a 2–2 away draw against Plaza Amador. He scored his first goal for the club on 1 February 2014, netting the game's only in a home defeat of San Francisco.

On 15 January 2016, Bárcenas was loaned to Croatian side RNK Split for six months. After appearing rarely, he returned to Árabe Unido before joining Ascenso MX side Cafetaleros de Tapachula on 23 January 2017, also in a temporary deal.

On 26 December 2017, Bárcenas joined Cafetaleros permanently, with a deal to Tijuana arranged in the following July. On 18 July 2018, however, he was loaned to Segunda División side Real Oviedo for one year. On 9 August 2019, Bárcenas' loan was extended for a further campaign.

On 5 October 2020, Bárcenas joined Girona on loan. The following 8 August, he moved to fellow second division team CD Leganés also in a temporary deal.

In June 2022, Liga MX club Mazatlán announced they had signed Bárcenas to a deal.

On 26 August 2026, Bárcenas signed with Iraklis.

== International career ==
Bárcenas made his full international debut for Panama on 6 August 2014, in a 3–0 loss against Peru. After featuring for under-23 side in the 2015 Pan American Games, he was included in Hernán Darío Gómez's squads for the 2017 Copa Centroamericana and the 2017 CONCACAF Gold Cup.

On 14 May 2018, Bárcenas was named in Panama's preliminary 35-man squad for the 2018 FIFA World Cup in Russia, and was also among the final squad announced on 30 May. He appeared in all matches of the tournament, as Panama was knocked out in the group stage.

On 27 March 2026, he made his 100th international appearance for Panama, scoring a goal in a 1–1 friendly draw with South Africa. Later that year, he was selected in the 26-man squad for the 2026 FIFA World Cup.

== Career statistics ==
=== Club ===
As of match played 25 April 2026

Appearances and goals by club, season and competition
Club	Season	League			National cup (Note: Includes Copa Panamá, Copa del Rey and U.S. Open Cup)		Continental		Other		Total	
Club	Season	Division	Apps	Goals	Apps	Goals	Apps	Goals	Apps	Goals	Apps	Goals
Árabe Unido	2012–13	Liga Panameña de Fútbol	11	0	—		—		—		11	0
Árabe Unido	2013–14	Liga Panameña de Fútbol	26	8	—		2 (Note: Appearance(s) in CONCACAF Champions Cup)	0	—		28	8
Árabe Unido	2014–15	Liga Panameña de Fútbol	36	5	—		—		—		36	5
Árabe Unido	2015–16	Liga Panameña de Fútbol	12	0	—		4	0	—		16	0
Árabe Unido	2016–17	Liga Panameña de Fútbol	14	1	—		4	2	—		18	2
Árabe Unido	Total		99	14	—		10	2	—		109	16
RNK Split (loan)	2015–16	Croatian Football League	8	0	—		—		—		8	0
Cafetaleros (loan)	2016–17	Ascenso MX	12	5	—		—		—		12	5
Cafetaleros (loan)	2017–18	Ascenso MX	33	7	4	3	—		—		37	10
Cafetaleros (loan)	Total		45	12	4	3	—		—		49	15
Tijuana	2018–19	Liga MX	0	0	0	0	—		—		0	0
Oviedo (loan)	2018–19	Segunda División	37	6	1	0	—		—		38	6
Oviedo (loan)	2019–20	Segunda División	33	8	1	0	—		—		34	8
Oviedo (loan)	Total		70	14	2	0	—		—		72	14
Girona (loan)	2020–21	Segunda División	36	3	4	0	—		3 (Note: Appearance(s) in La Liga play-offs)	1	43	3
Leganés (loan)	2021–22	Segunda División	26	2	1	0	—		—		27	2
Mazatlán	2022–23	Liga MX	28	0	0	0	—		—		28	0
Mazatlán	2023–24	Liga MX	23	3	0	0	—		1 (Note: Appearance(s) in Leagues Cup)	0	24	3
Mazatlán	2024–25	Liga MX	24	0	0	0	—		5	2	29	2
Mazatlán	2025–26	Liga MX	30	3	0	0	—		0	0	30	3
Mazatlán	Total		105	6	0	0	—		6	2	111	8
Career total			389	51	11	3	10	2	9	3	419	58

=== International ===
As of match played 27 June 2026

Appearances and goals by national team and year
National team	Year	Apps	Goals
Panama	2014	2	0
Panama	2015	0	0
Panama	2016	7	0
Panama	2017	16 (Note: He featured in 4 unofficial FIFA matches: Martinique (2017, 2022 twice, 2023).)	0
Panama	2018	9	0
Panama	2019	8	1
Panama	2020	1	0
Panama	2021	14	1
Panama	2022	13	3
Panama	2023	13	4
Panama	2024	12	0
Panama	2025	4	0
Panama	2026	8	1
Total		107	10

Scores and results list Panama's goal tally first.

List of international goals scored by Yoel Bárcenas
No.	Date	Venue	Opponent	Score	Result	Competition
1.	18 June 2019	Allianz Field, Saint Paul, United States	Trinidad and Tobago	2–0	2–0	2019 CONCACAF Gold Cup
2.	8 June 2021	Estadio Nacional, Panama City, Panama	Dominican Republic	2–0	3–0	2022 FIFA World Cup qualification
3.	9 June 2022	Estadio Rommel Fernández, Panama City, Panama	Martinique	4–0	5–0	2022–23 CONCACAF Nations League A
4.	9 June 2022	Estadio Rommel Fernández, Panama City, Panama	Martinique	5–0	5–0	2022–23 CONCACAF Nations League A
5.	5 November 2022	Estadio Municipal de Marbella, Marbella, Spain	Qatar	1–2	1–2	Friendly
6.	26 June 2023	DRV PNK Stadium, Fort Lauderdale, United States	Costa Rica	2–0	2–1	2023 CONCACAF Gold Cup
7.	8 July 2023	AT&T Stadium, Arlington, United States	Qatar	1–0	4–0	2023 CONCACAF Gold Cup
8.	13 October 2023	Ergilio Hato Stadium, Willemstad, Curaçao	Curaçao	1–0	2–1	2023–24 CONCACAF Nations League A
9.	20 November 2023	Estadio Rommel Fernández, Panama City, Panama	Costa Rica	3–0	3–1	2023–24 CONCACAF Nations League A
10.	27 March 2026	Moses Mabhida Stadium, Durban, South Africa	South Africa	1–0	1–1	Friendly

== Honours ==
Cafetaleros

- Ascenso MX: Clausura 2018

Panama

- CONCACAF Gold Cup runner-up: 2023
- CONCACAF Nations League runner-up: 2024–25

Individual

- CONCACAF Gold Cup Best XI: 2023

== See also ==
- List of men's footballers with 100 or more international caps
