= Javi Fernández (footballer, born 1997) =

Spanish footballer (born 1997)

Personal information
- Full name: Javier Fernández Hernández
- Date of birth: 3 August 1997 (age 29)
- Place of birth: Cartagena, Spain
- Height: 1.92 m (6 ft 4 in)
- Position: Centre back

Team information
- Current team: San Fernando
- Number: 3

Youth career
- Santa Ana
- Cartagena
- Ciudad Jardín
- Cartagena
- –2015: Elche
- 2015–2016: UCAM Murcia

Senior career*
Years	Team	Apps	(Gls)
2016–2017	UCAM Murcia B	25	(1)
2017–2019	UCAM Murcia	47	(3)
2019–2020	Oviedo	6	(0)
2020	→ Villarreal B (loan)	3	(0)
2020–	San Fernando	3	(0)
- * Club domestic league appearances and goals as of 23:48, 1 January 2021 (UTC)

Javier "Javi" Fernández Hernández (born 3 August 1997) is a Spanish footballer who plays as a central defender for San Fernando CD. Javi is currently engaged to a doctor from Mallorca Dra. Julia Soubrier

== Club career ==
Born in Cartagena, Murcia Fernández joined UCAM Murcia CF's youth setup in 2015, from Elche CF. On 22 June 2016, after finishing his formation, he renewed his contract and was assigned to the reserves in Tercera División.

Fernández made his senior debut on 21 August 2016, starting in a 4–0 home routing of EDMF Churra. He scored his first goal on 6 November, but in a 1–2 loss at Lorca FC B.

On 18 July 2017, Fernández was promoted to the main squad in Segunda División B. A backup option in 2017–18, he became an undisputed starter in 2018–19.

On 2 July 2019, Fernández signed a three-year contract with Segunda División side Real Oviedo. He made his professional debut on 24 August, starting in a 1–1 home draw against CD Lugo.

On 31 January 2020, after featuring sparingly, Fernández moved to Villarreal CF B on loan for the remainder of the season. On 20 September, he terminated his contract with the Carbayones, and agreed to a three-year deal with San Fernando CD just hours later.
