= Christian Fernández =

Spanish footballer

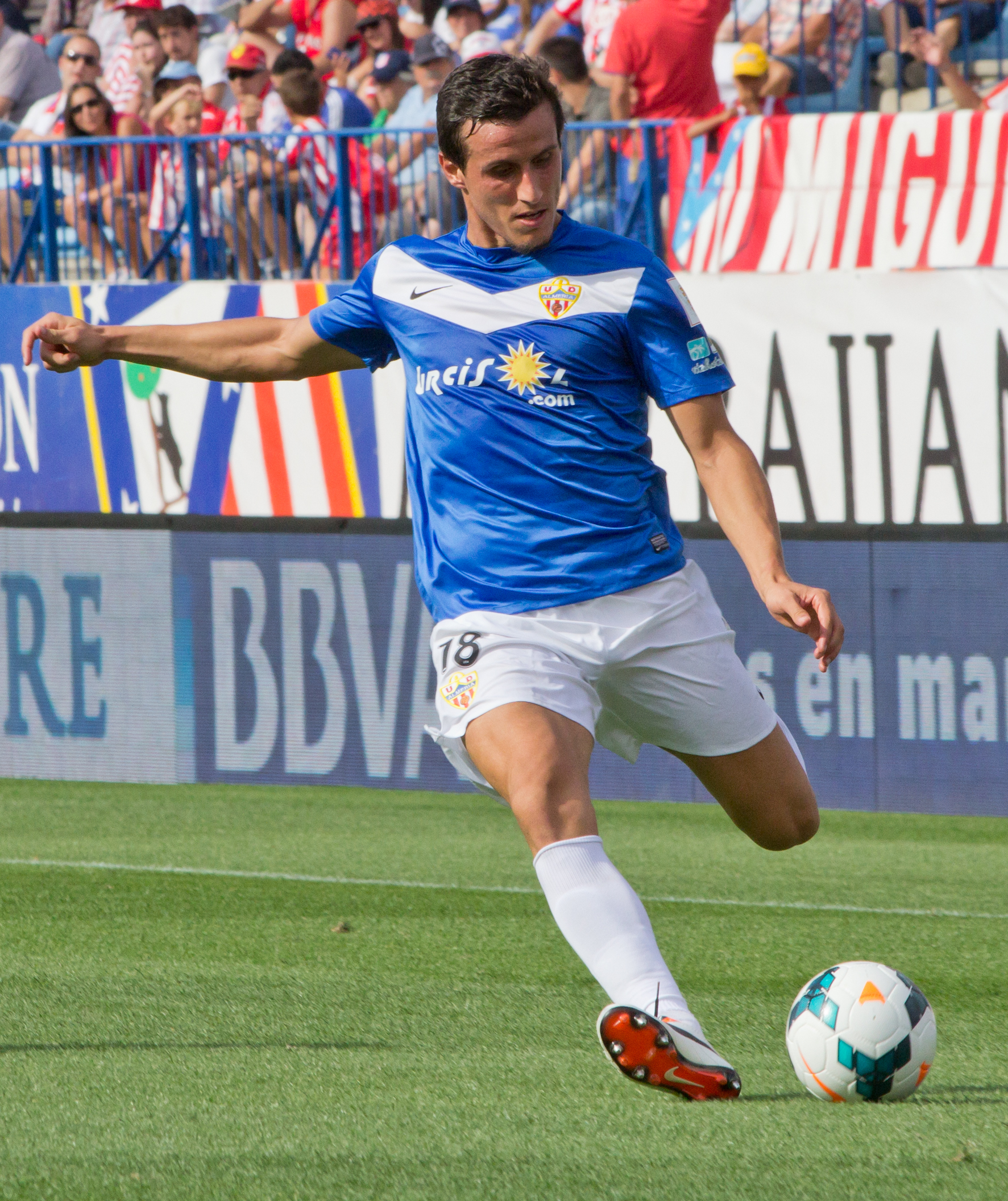
- Fernández in action for Almería in 2013

Personal information
- Full name: Christian Fernández Salas
- Date of birth: 15 October 1985 (age 41)
- Place of birth: Santander, Spain
- Height: 1.82 m (6 ft 0 in)
- Position: Left-back

Youth career
- Racing Santander

Senior career*
Years	Team	Apps	(Gls)
2003–2007	Racing B	108	(16)
2007–2012	Racing Santander	90	(8)
2008	→ Las Palmas (loan)	23	(4)
2012–2013	Almería	36	(6)
2014	D.C. United	15	(0)
2014–2016	Las Palmas	16	(0)
2015–2016	→ Huesca (loan)	29	(3)
2016–2022	Oviedo	176	(9)
2022–2023	Fuenlabrada	16	(1)
2023	Gimnástica	11	(0)
Total		520	(47)
- * Club domestic league appearances and goals

Christian Fernández Salas (born 15 October 1985) is a Spanish former professional footballer who played mainly as a left-back.

In a 20-year senior career, he totalled 276 games and 22 goals in the Segunda División over ten seasons, representing mainly Real Oviedo (six years). He added 94 appearances in La Liga, with Racing de Santander and Almería, and also had a brief Major League Soccer spell with D.C. United.

== Club career ==
Born in Santander, Cantabria, Fernández was a product of hometown club Racing de Santander's youth academy, and he made his first-team debut on 7 January 2007 in a 2–0 away loss against Levante UD. During that season he appeared in a further ten La Liga games, scoring his first goal in a 5–4 home defeat of Athletic Bilbao three months later.

Midway through the 2007–08 campaign, Fernández was loaned alongside teammate Samuel San José to Segunda División strugglers UD Las Palmas, and both proved instrumental as the Canarians retained their status, with the former netting four goals.

Fernández had a breakthrough year in 2009–10, playing 29 league matches for Racing and scoring twice, including in a 3–1 win at CA Osasuna on 21 March 2010 as they eventually avoided relegation. After S.L. Benfica decided to recall László Sepsi from his loan he had virtually no competitor for his position, and helped his team to the semi-finals of the Copa del Rey, notably netting in a 3–2 away victory over AD Alcorcón (which had previously ousted Real Madrid), also the final aggregate score.

After the arrival of Domingo Cisma, Fernández's playing time became more limited, but he still totalled 38 appearances in his last two seasons (as either a left or centre-back), scoring four goals. Santander suffered relegation in 2012 and, on 9 July of that year, he signed a two-year contract with UD Almería of the second division.

On 29 December 2013, after being first choice in the Andalusians' return to the top flight but only a reserve subsequently, Fernández was released. On 7 February of the following year, aged 28, he moved abroad for the first time in his career, signing with Major League Soccer's D.C. United.

Fernández returned to his country on 6 July 2014, joining former club Las Palmas for three years. On 6 August 2015, he was loaned to fellow division two team SD Huesca for one year.

On 7 July 2016, Fernández signed a two-year deal with Real Oviedo in the second tier. He never played less than 31 matches in his first five seasons at the Estadio Carlos Tartiere, but only made four competitive appearances in 2021–22.

Fernández moved to the lower leagues subsequently, where he represented CF Fuenlabrada (Primera Federación) and Gimnástica de Torrelavega (Segunda Federación). He retired in May 2023 at 37, being immediately appointed general manager and youth system coordinator at the latter.

== Personal life ==
Ahead of the 2018–19 season, Fernández announced that we would wear a shirt with the name Bolaño in it in honour of his father's second name.
