= Sergio Tejera =

Spanish footballer

Personal information
- Full name: Sergio Tejera Rodríguez
- Date of birth: 28 May 1990 (age 36)
- Place of birth: Barcelona, Spain
- Height: 1.80 m (5 ft 11 in)
- Position: Midfielder

Team information
- Current team: Racing Ferrol
- Number: 14

Youth career
- 1996–2000: Damm
- 2000–2006: Espanyol
- 2006–2009: Chelsea

Senior career*
Years	Team	Apps	(Gls)
2009	Chelsea	0	(0)
2009	→ Mallorca B (loan)	19	(6)
2009–2011	Mallorca B	23	(2)
2010–2012	Mallorca	31	(0)
2012–2015	Espanyol	12	(1)
2014–2015	→ Alavés (loan)	22	(1)
2015–2018	Gimnàstic	96	(7)
2018–2021	Oviedo	102	(10)
2021–2022	Cartagena	44	(0)
2022–2024	Anorthosis	42	(2)
2024–2025	APOEL	29	(1)
2025–	Racing Ferrol	27	(0)

International career
2005	Spain U16	1	(0)
2007	Spain U17	2	(1)
2013	Catalonia	1	(0)
- * Club domestic league appearances and goals as of 9 June 2026

Sergio Tejera Rodríguez (born 28 May 1990) is a Spanish professional footballer who plays for Primera Federación club Racing de Ferrol.

== Club career ==
Born in Barcelona, Catalonia, Tejera joined local RCD Espanyol's youth ranks in 2000, aged 10. Six years later, he was spotted by Chelsea scout Frank Arnesen during a match with the Spain under-15s, joining the London club in late March. During his spell with the Blues, he appeared in 22 games for the reserves and scored once.

In the last days of the 2009 January transfer window, Chelsea agreed to loan Tejera to RCD Mallorca in his country. On 24 July, the Balearic Islands side exercised their buying option on the player and signed him to a permanent contract.

Tejera spent the vast majority of his first seasons with Mallorca with the B team in the Segunda División B. On 7 November 2010, he made his first-team – and La Liga – debut, playing 11 minutes in a 3–2 away loss against Real Zaragoza.

In the summer of 2012, Tejera returned to Espanyol as Javi Márquez moved in the opposite direction. He scored his only goal in the top flight on 2 September, his team's second in a 3–2 defeat at Levante UD.

On 29 January 2014, after receiving no playing time during the campaign, Tejera was loaned to Deportivo Alavés until June. On 4 August, the move was extended for one year.

Tejera terminated his contract with Espanyol on 8 July 2015, and moved to neighbouring Gimnàstic de Tarragona hours later. On 11 June 2018, he signed a two-year deal with Segunda División club Real Oviedo.

On 2 July 2021, free agent Tejera agreed to a two-year contract with FC Cartagena, still in the second tier. He moved abroad again in January 2023, joining Anorthosis Famagusta FC of the Cypriot First Division until June 2024.

On 24 May 2024, Tejera signed a one-year deal with APOEL FC of the same country and league.

== Career statistics ==
As of match played 11 May 2024

Club	Season	League			National Cup		Europe		Other		Total	
Club	Season	Division	Apps	Goals	Apps	Goals	Apps	Goals	Apps	Goals	Apps	Goals
Mallorca	2010–11	La Liga	16	0	2	0	—		—		18	0
Mallorca	2011–12	La Liga	15	0	3	0	—		—		18	0
Mallorca	Subtotal		31	0	5	0	—		—		36	0
Espanyol	2012–13	La Liga	12	1	1	0	—		—		13	1
Alavés (loan)	2013–14	Segunda División	13	0	0	0	—		—		13	0
Alavés (loan)	2014–15	Segunda División	9	1	3	0	—		—		12	1
Alavés (loan)	Subtotal		22	1	3	0	—		—		25	1
Gimnàstic	2015–16	Segunda División	34	0	1	0	—		2 (Note: Appearances in La Liga play-offs)	0	37	0
Gimnàstic	2016–17	Segunda División	36	6	2	0	—		—		38	6
Gimnàstic	2017–18	Segunda División	26	1	0	0	—		—		26	1
Gimnàstic	Subtotal		96	7	3	0	—		2	0	101	7
Oviedo	2018–19	Segunda División	34	4	1	0	—		—		35	4
Oviedo	2019–20	Segunda División	35	2	0	0	—		—		35	2
Oviedo	2020–21	Segunda División	33	4	0	0	—		—		33	4
Oviedo	Subtotal		102	10	1	0	—		—		103	10
Cartagena	2021–22	Segunda División	32	0	0	0	—		—		32	0
Cartagena	2022–23	Segunda División	12	0	1	0	—		—		13	0
Cartagena	Subtotal		44	0	1	0	—		—		45	0
Anorthosis	2022–23	Cypriot First Division	14	2	3	1	—		—		17	3
Anorthosis	2023–24	Cypriot First Division	28	0	2	0	—		—		30	0
Anorthosis	Subtotal		42	2	5	1	—		—		47	3
Career total			349	21	19	1	0	0	2	0	370	22

== Honours ==
Spain U17

- FIFA U-17 World Cup runner-up: 2007
