= Lolo González =

Spanish footballer (born 1991)

Personal information
- Full name: Emmanuel González Rodríguez
- Date of birth: 22 July 1991 (age 35)
- Place of birth: Sanlúcar de Barrameda, Spain
- Height: 1.86 m (6 ft 1 in)
- Position: Defensive midfielder

Team information
- Current team: Estepona
- Number: 5

Youth career
- 1995–2005: CD Sanlúcar
- 2005–2010: Sanluqueño

Senior career*
Years	Team	Apps	(Gls)
2008–2009	Sanluqueño B	6	(1)
2010–2012	Sanluqueño	68	(4)
2012–2015	Betis B	36	(5)
2012–2013	→ Sanluqueño (loan)	27	(5)
2015–2016	San Roque	34	(5)
2016–2017	Marbella	29	(1)
2017–2018	El Ejido	36	(10)
2018–2019	Oviedo B	20	(8)
2019	→ Extremadura (loan)	12	(2)
2019–2020	Oviedo	28	(1)
2020–2022	San Fernando	23	(2)
2021	→ Extremadura (loan)	11	(0)
2022	→ Sanluqueño (loan)	20	(1)
2022–2023	Linares Deportivo	36	(2)
2023–2025	Ceuta	42	(3)
2025	Melilla	15	(1)
2025–2026	Estepona	2	(0)
2025–2026	CD Badajoz		
- * Club domestic league appearances and goals as of 28 September 2025

Emmanuel "Lolo" González Rodríguez (born 22 July 1991) is a Spanish professional footballer who plays for Tercera Federación club CD Badajoz as a defensive midfielder.

== Club career ==
Born in Sanlúcar de Barrameda, Cádiz, Lolo joined Atlético Sanluqueño CF's youth setup at the age of 14, from CD Sanlúcar. On 14 September 2008, aged just 17, he made his senior debut with the reserves by starting in a 1–0 Regional Preferente Cádiz home win against Atlético Zabal; seven days later he scored his first senior goal, in a 6–0 away routing of Federico Mayo CF.

Lolo made his first team debut on 13 March 2010, playing the full 90 minutes in a 0–1 loss at Recreativo de Huelva B in the Tercera División. Definitely promoted to the main squad ahead of the 2010–11 season, he immediately became a first choice, and contributed with 38 appearances (play-offs included) as his side achieved promotion to the Segunda División B in 2012.

On 6 July 2012, Lolo signed for Real Betis, being immediately loaned back to Sanluqueño for one year. Upon returning, he was assigned to the B-team in the fourth division, and helped in their promotion to the third division in 2013–14.

On 13 August 2015, free agent Lolo joined CD San Roque de Lepe of the third tier, suffering team relegation at the end of the campaign. The following 28 June, he moved to fellow league team Marbella FC, being again a regular starter.

On 28 June 2017, Lolo agreed to a contract with CD El Ejido, still in the third division. A year later, after scoring a career-best ten goals, he signed for Real Oviedo, being initially assigned to the B-team also in level three.

On 18 January 2019, Lolo was loaned to Segunda División side Extremadura UD, for six months. He made his professional debut on 16 March, coming on as a late substitute for Alberto Perea in a 0–1 away loss against Albacete Balompié.

Lolo scored his first professional goal on 6 April 2019, netting the game's only through a penalty kick in a home defeat of UD Almería.

== Career statistics ==
As of 14 June 2019

Club statistics
Club	Season	League			Cup		Continental		Other		Total	
Club	Season	Division	Apps	Goals	Apps	Goals	Apps	Goals	Apps	Goals	Apps	Goals
Sanluqueño B	2008–09	Regional Preferente	6	1	—						29	5
Sanluqueño	2009–10	Tercera División	3	0	—		—		—		3	0
Sanluqueño	2010–11	Tercera División	34	4	—		—		—		34	4
Sanluqueño	2011–12	Tercera División	31	0	—		—		6	0	37	0
Sanluqueño	2012–13	Segunda División B	27	5	2	0	—		—		29	5
Sanluqueño	Totals		95	9	2	0	—		6	0	103	9
Betis B	2013–14	Tercera División	25	4	—				3	0	28	4
Betis B	2014–15	Segunda División B	11	1	—						11	1
Betis B	Totals		36	5	—				3	0	39	5
San Roque de Lepe	2015–16	Segunda División B	34	5	—		—		—		34	5
Marbella	2016–17	Segunda División B	29	1	—		—		—		29	1
El Ejido	2017–18	Segunda División B	36	10	—		—		—		36	10
Real Oviedo B	2018–19	Segunda División B	20	8	—						20	8
Extremadura	2018–19	Segunda División	12	2	0	0	—		—		12	2
Career totals			268	41	2	0	0	0	9	0	279	41
