= Simone Grippo =

Swiss footballer (born 1988)

Personal information
- Date of birth: 12 December 1988 (age 37)
- Place of birth: Ettingen, Switzerland
- Height: 1.85 m (6 ft 1 in)
- Position: Centre back

Team information
- Current team: FC Basel (coach)

Youth career
- 1998–2005: Ettingen
- 2005–2006: Basel

Senior career*
Years	Team	Apps	(Gls)
2006–2008	Basel U-21	22	(1)
2007–2008	→ Concordia (loan)	24	(4)
2008	→ Bellinzona (loan)	0	(0)
2008–2011	ChievoVerona	2	(0)
2009	→ Piacenza (loan)	3	(0)
2009–2010	→ Lumezzane (loan)	17	(1)
2010	→ Frosinone (loan)	23	(0)
2011–2012	→ Lugano (loan)	13	(1)
2012–2013	Servette	9	(0)
2013–2017	Vaduz	97	(7)
2017–2020	Zaragoza	64	(3)
2020–2021	Oviedo	32	(1)
2021–2024	Lausanne-Sport	42	(2)
2022	Lausanne-Sport II	1	(0)

International career^{‡}
2006	Switzerland U-18	2	(0)
2006–2007	Switzerland U-19	6	(0)
2007–2008	Switzerland U-20	9	(2)
2009–2010	Switzerland U-21	3	(0)
- * Club domestic league appearances and goals as of 27 May 2024 ‡ National team caps and goals as of 21 January 2018

Simone Grippo (born 12 December 1988) is a Swiss former professional footballer who played as central defender. He was a Swiss youth international footballer. Since January 2025 he works for FC Basel's youth department as coordinater and coach.

== Career ==
=== Club ===
Born and living in Ettingen, Grippo started his youth football with the local amateur club FC Ettingen.

In the summer of 2005, Grippo joined the youth department of FC Basel and played in their U-18 team during the 2005–06 season, under coach Patrick Rahmen and his assistant Marco Walker and with them won both the Swiss U-18 championship and the U-19/18 national cup that season. In the summer of 2006 he advanced to join their U-21 team and before the season started attended the trainings of the first team under head coach Christian Gross. After playing in two test games, Grippo played his debut for the team in the first qualifying round of the 2006–07 UEFA Cup, on 13 July 2006. He was in the starting eleven, playing as central midfielder, as Basel played a home game in the St. Jakob-Park and they won 3–1 against Kazakhi side FC Tobol.

On 12 July 2007 Basel announced that they were loaning Grippo out to local feeder club FC Concordia Basel for the 2007–08 Challenge League season. Originally it had been a six month loan period to Concordia, but in December the two clubs, together with the player, agreed to extended it into a full season loan. Grippo had 25 league and two cup appearances, scoring a total of five goals. Concordia ended the league season in seventh position.

In summer 2008 he was loaned out to AC Bellinzona, but before he could play any competitive games, he left them again and on 5 August it was announced that he signed for A.C. ChievoVerona of Italian Serie A on a permanent contract.

He made his first appearance for Chievo Verona on 11 January 2009, which resulted in a 1–1 draw against FC Bologna. The young prospect was loaned successively to Piacenza, Lumezzane, Frosinone and then to Lugano. Grippo's loan to Piacenza was for the second half of the 2008–09 Serie B. He was with Lumezzane, in the Serie C during the 2009–10 season. With Frosinone he played the 2010–11 Serie B season, but at the end they suffered relegation. For the second half of 2011–12 Challenge League season Grippo was loaned back to Switzerland and played for Lugano, where he will establish himself as a defender in the starting formation. On 15 July 2012 Swiss Super League club Servette announced that they had signed a 3-year contract with Grippo.

He made his debut in a 5–1 away defeat against Lausanne-Sport. However, before the winter break he suffered an injury and was out for over six months with persistent bursitis of the knee, then at the end of the 2012–13 Swiss Super League season his contract was dissolved as Servette suffered relegation.

During his recovery from his knee problems, he had kept himself fit training with FC Basel under observation of their medical team, because he was not under contract with a club.

On 19 December 2013, the Swiss Football League (SFL) announced that Grippo had signed for Vaduz and he stayed with them for three and a half seasons. In his first, the team became 2013–14 Swiss Challenge League champions and won promotion. But in his last the team suffered relegation. During his time with Vaduz he made 97 league appearances, scoring seven goals. Also during this time the team won the Liechtensteiner Cup four times. He left the club at the end of June 2017, because he did not extend his expiring contract.

On 13 June 2017, he signed a two-year contract with Spanish Segunda División side Real Zaragoza.

On 13 January 2020, he signed for Segunda side Real Oviedo and he was team captain until the end of the season.

In 2021 Grippo returned to Switzerland, on 29 August Lausanne-Sport announced that they had signed a contract with Grippo for the 2021–22 Swiss Super League season. However at the end of the season the team suffered relegation.

After the relegation with Lausanne, Grippo remained combative. In an interview he promised to stay with the club and it was his aim for an immediate promotion at the end of the 2022–23 Swiss Challenge League season. This was achieved as division runners-up. He remained with the club for another year and after the 2023–24 Swiss Super League season Grippo retired from his active career.

=== International ===
Grippo is of Italian descent. He was a youth international for Switzerland.

=== Post-playing career ===
On 3 January 2025, FC Basel 1893 announced that they had hired their former player Grippo to look after and coordinate the loaned FCB players. He also took on special coaching duties in the Rotblau youth department.

== Honours ==
Basel

- Swiss Champion at U-18 level: 2005–06
- Swiss Cup Winner at U-19/U-18 level: 2005–06

Lumezzane

- Coppa Italia Serie C: 2009–10

Vaduz

- Swiss Challenge League: 2013–14
- Liechtensteiner Cup: 2013–14, 2014–15, 2015–16, 2016–17

== Sources ==
- Josef Zindel (2018). FC Basel 1893. Die ersten 125 Jahre (in German). Basel: Friedrich Reinhardt Verlag. ISBN 978-3-7245-2305-5.
