= Edu Cortina =

Spanish footballer

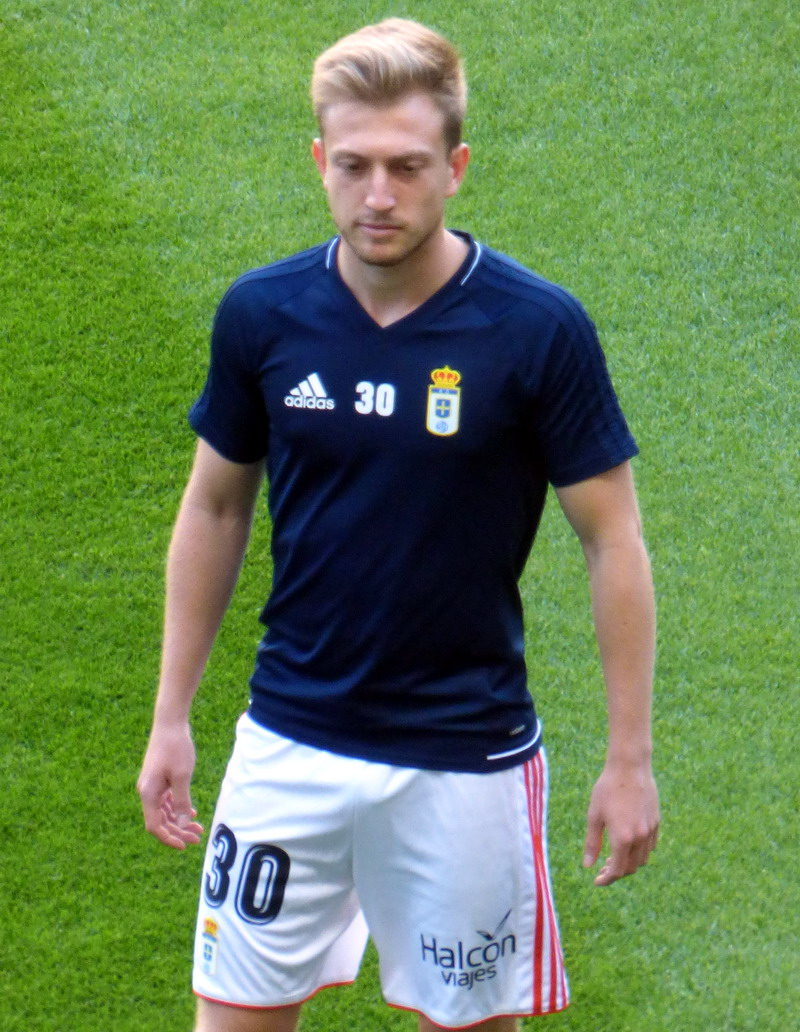
- Cortina with Oviedo B in 2017

Personal information
- Full name: Eduardo Cortina García
- Date of birth: 25 September 1996 (age 30)
- Place of birth: Oviedo, Spain
- Height: 1.74 m (5 ft 9 in)
- Position: Midfielder

Team information
- Current team: Real Avilés
- Number: 6

Youth career
- 2005–2015: Oviedo

Senior career*
Years	Team	Apps	(Gls)
2015–2019	Oviedo B	114	(9)
2018–2020	Oviedo	11	(0)
2020–2021	Mérida	4	(0)
2021–2022	Unionistas	15	(0)
2022–	Real Avilés	61	(1)
- * Club domestic league appearances and goals as of 15 June 2025

Eduardo "Edu" Cortina García (born 25 September 1996) is a Spanish footballer who plays for Real Avilés as a midfielder.

== Club career ==
Born in Oviedo, Asturias, Cortina finished his formation with Real Oviedo. He made his senior debut with the reserves during the 2015–16 campaign, in Tercera División.

Cortina made his professional debut on 11 September 2018, coming on as a first-half substitute for injured Sergio Tejera in a 0–1 away loss against RCD Mallorca for the season's Copa del Rey. Five days later he made his Segunda División debut, replacing Javi Muñoz in a 2–0 away win against CD Lugo.

On 11 June 2019, Cortina was one of the seven players from the B-side who were promoted to the main squad for the 2019–20 campaign. On 28 September of the following year, after featuring rarely, he terminated his contract, and signed for Segunda División B side Mérida AD just hours later.
