= Mossa (footballer) =

Spanish footballer (born 1989)

Personal information
- Full name: José María Angresola Jiménez
- Date of birth: 24 January 1989 (age 37)
- Place of birth: Valencia, Spain
- Height: 1.78 m (5 ft 10 in)
- Position: Left-back

Team information
- Current team: Mallorca (assistant)

Youth career
- 2006–2008: Levante

Senior career*
| Years | Team | Apps | (Gls) |
| 2008–2011 | Levante B | 109 | (5) |
| 2008–2009 | Levante | 2 | (0) |
| 2011–2012 | Valencia B | 20 | (0) |
| 2012–2014 | Levante B | 72 | (3) |
| 2014–2017 | Gimnàstic | 116 | (0) |
| 2017–2022 | Oviedo | 146 | (4) |
| Total | | 460 | (14) |

Managerial career
- 2022–2023: Huesca (assistant)
- 2025–2026: Las Palmas (assistant)
- 2026–: Mallorca (assistant)
- * Club domestic league appearances and goals

José María Angresola Jiménez (born 24 January 1989), commonly known as Mossa, is a Spanish retired footballer who played as a left-back, and is the current assistant manager of RCD Mallorca.

== Club career ==
Born in Valencia, Valencian Community, Mossa graduated from local Levante UD's youth system, and made his senior debuts with the reserves in the 2007–08 campaign, in the Segunda División B. On 6 December 2008, he played his first match as a professional, coming on as a late substitute in a 3–1 home win against Albacete Balompié in the Segunda División.

On 20 June of the following year Mossa was handed his first start, playing the full 90 minutes in a 2–2 home draw against UD Las Palmas. He continued to appear regularly with the B-side in the Tercera División, however.

On 5 July 2011, Mossa signed a two-year deal with another reserve team, Valencia CF Mestalla. A year later, however, he returned to his previous club's B-side, now back to the third level.

On 7 July 2014, Mossa joined Gimnàstic de Tarragona, in the same division. He appeared in 37 matches during the season, as his club returned to the second level after a three-year absence.

On 31 July 2017, after becoming an undisputed starter for Nàstic, Mossa signed a two-year contract with fellow second-tier club Real Oviedo. On 4 July 2022, he retired at the age of 33 after his contract expired, and became an assistant of José Ángel Ziganda at SD Huesca.
