= Carlos Hernández (footballer, born 1990) =

Spanish footballer

Personal information
- Full name: Carlos Hernández Alarcón
- Date of birth: 15 September 1990 (age 36)
- Place of birth: Jaén, Spain
- Height: 1.85 m (6 ft 1 in)
- Position: Centre-back

Team information
- Current team: Ceuta
- Number: 6

Youth career
- Jaén

Senior career*
Years	Team	Apps	(Gls)
2008–2011	Jaén B	47	(6)
2010–2012	Jaén	45	(1)
2012–2013	Zaragoza B	35	(2)
2013–2015	Sabadell	67	(1)
2015–2017	Lugo	58	(5)
2017–2021	Oviedo	112	(10)
2021–2022	Alcorcón	18	(0)
2022–2024	Eldense	56	(1)
2024–	Ceuta	79	(8)
- * Club domestic league appearances and goals as of 13:30, 8 October 2026 (UTC)

Carlos Hernández Alarcón (born 15 September 1990) is a Spanish professional footballer who plays as a central defender for Segunda División club Ceuta.

He made more than 300 appearances in the Segunda División, representing Sabadell, Lugo, Oviedo (four seasons), Alcorcón, Eldense and Ceuta.

== Club career ==
Born in Jaén, Andalusia, Hernández finished his youth career with local club Real Jaén, making his senior debut with their reserves in the regional leagues. He was promoted to the first team in the summer of 2011, appearing in 37 matches in his first season as they failed to promote from Segunda División B.

On 14 July 2012, Hernández signed with Real Zaragoza, who paid €70,000 for his services, He was immediately assigned to the reserves, also in the third division.

Hernández joined CE Sabadell FC of Segunda División on 9 August 2013. He played his first game as a professional on the 18th, featuring the full 90 minutes and scoring his side's second goal in a 4–0 home win against RCD Mallorca.

On 4 July 2015, Hernández moved to CD Lugo in the same league after agreeing to a two-year deal. On 28 June 2017, he signed a two-year contract with Real Oviedo also in the second tier. He scored a career-best six goals in his first season, helping to a seventh-place finish.

On 28 June 2021, the free agent Hernández signed a two-year deal with AD Alcorcón, still in division two. On 23 August of the following year, he joined Primera Federación club CD Eldense, and was a regular starter during the campaign as they returned to the second tier after a 59-year absence.

Hernández was announced at AD Ceuta FC on 12 July 2024. He achieved another promotion to the professional leagues at the end of his first season, scoring three goals for the champions.

== Honours ==
Ceuta

- Primera Federación: 2024–25
