= Juanjo Nieto =

Spanish footballer (born 1994)

Personal information
- Full name: Juan José Nieto Zarzoso
- Date of birth: 3 October 1994 (age 32)
- Place of birth: Castellón de la Plana, Spain
- Height: 1.72 m (5 ft 8 in)
- Position: Right-back

Team information
- Current team: Castellón
- Number: 2

Youth career
- 2000–2002: Rafalafena
- 2002–2007: Castellón
- 2007–2008: Futur
- 2008–2009: Roda
- 2009–2012: Rafalafena
- 2012–2013: Castellón

Senior career*
Years	Team	Apps	(Gls)
2012	Castellón	3	(0)
2013–2015	Valladolid B	49	(3)
2015–2016	Atlético Baleares	25	(1)
2016–2017	Mallorca B	27	(0)
2017	Mallorca	6	(0)
2017–2019	Hércules	70	(2)
2019–2021	Oviedo	59	(3)
2021–2022	Almería	16	(0)
2022–2024	Huesca	40	(1)
2024–2026	Celje	51	(5)
2026–	Castellón	7	(0)
- * Club domestic league appearances and goals as of 17 October 2026

Juan José "Juanjo" Nieto Zarzoso (born 3 October 1994) is a Spanish footballer who plays for CD Castellón. Mainly a right back, he can also play as a winger.

== Football career ==
Born in Castellón de la Plana, Valencian Community, Nieto represented VV Rafalafena, CD Castellón, CF Futur and CD Roda as a youth. He made his senior debut with Castellón's first team on 16 December 2012, starting in a 1–1 Tercera División home draw against CD Eldense.

On 16 September 2013, Nieto joined Real Valladolid, being assigned to the reserves also in the fourth level. He achieved promotion to Segunda División B in his first season as an undisputed started, but was sparingly used in his second.

On 6 August 2015, Nieto signed for fellow third-tier club CD Atlético Baleares. The following 18 July he moved to another reserve team, RCD Mallorca B.

Nieto first appeared with the main squad on 22 January 2017, starting in a 1–1 Segunda División away draw against CF Reus Deportiu. On 14 July, after suffering relegation, he agreed to a deal with Hércules CF in the third division.

On 6 August 2019, Nieto returned to the second division after agreeing to a two-year deal with Real Oviedo. He scored his first professional goal on 1 December, netting the opener in a 2–1 home win over Rayo Vallecano.

On 9 July 2021, free agent Nieto signed a two-year contract with UD Almería also in the second level. He helped the side in their promotion to La Liga, but suffered a knee injury in February 2022.

On 25 November 2022, after recovering from injury, Nieto announced his departure from the Rojiblancos, and signed a 18-month deal with SD Huesca in the second division. In August 2024, he joined Slovenian PrvaLiga side NK Celje as a free agent.

On 25 June 2026, Nieto returned to his first club Castellón now in the second division, after agreeing to a three-year deal.

== Honours ==
Almería

- Segunda División: 2021–22

Celje

- Slovenian PrvaLiga: 2025–26
- Slovenian Cup: 2024–25
