= Estadio Carlos Tartiere =

Multi-use stadium in Oviedo, Spain

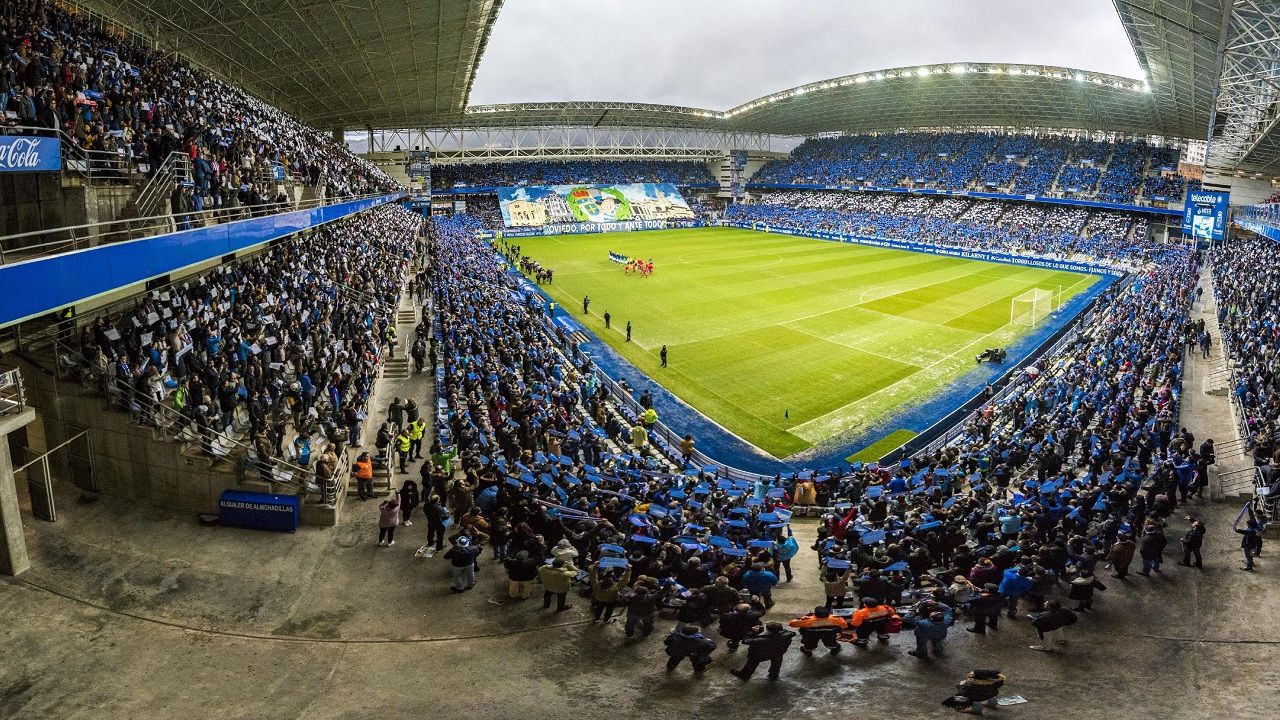
- UEFA
- Interactive map of Estadio Carlos Tartiere
- Full name: Estadio Municipal Carlos Tartiere
- Location: Oviedo, Spain
- Coordinates: 43.3608°N 5.8702°W
- Owner: Ayuntamiento de Oviedo
- Operator: Real Oviedo
- Capacity: 30,500
- Surface: Grass
- Record attendance: 30,000 vs. Cádiz (24 May 2015, Segunda División B)
- Field size: 105 m × 68 m (344 ft × 223 ft)

Construction
- Built: 18 June 1998
- Opened: September 20, 2000; 26 years ago
- Architects: Carlos Buxadé Ribot; Joan Margarit Consarnau; Emilio Llano

Tenants
- Real Oviedo (2000–present); Spain national football team (selected matches)

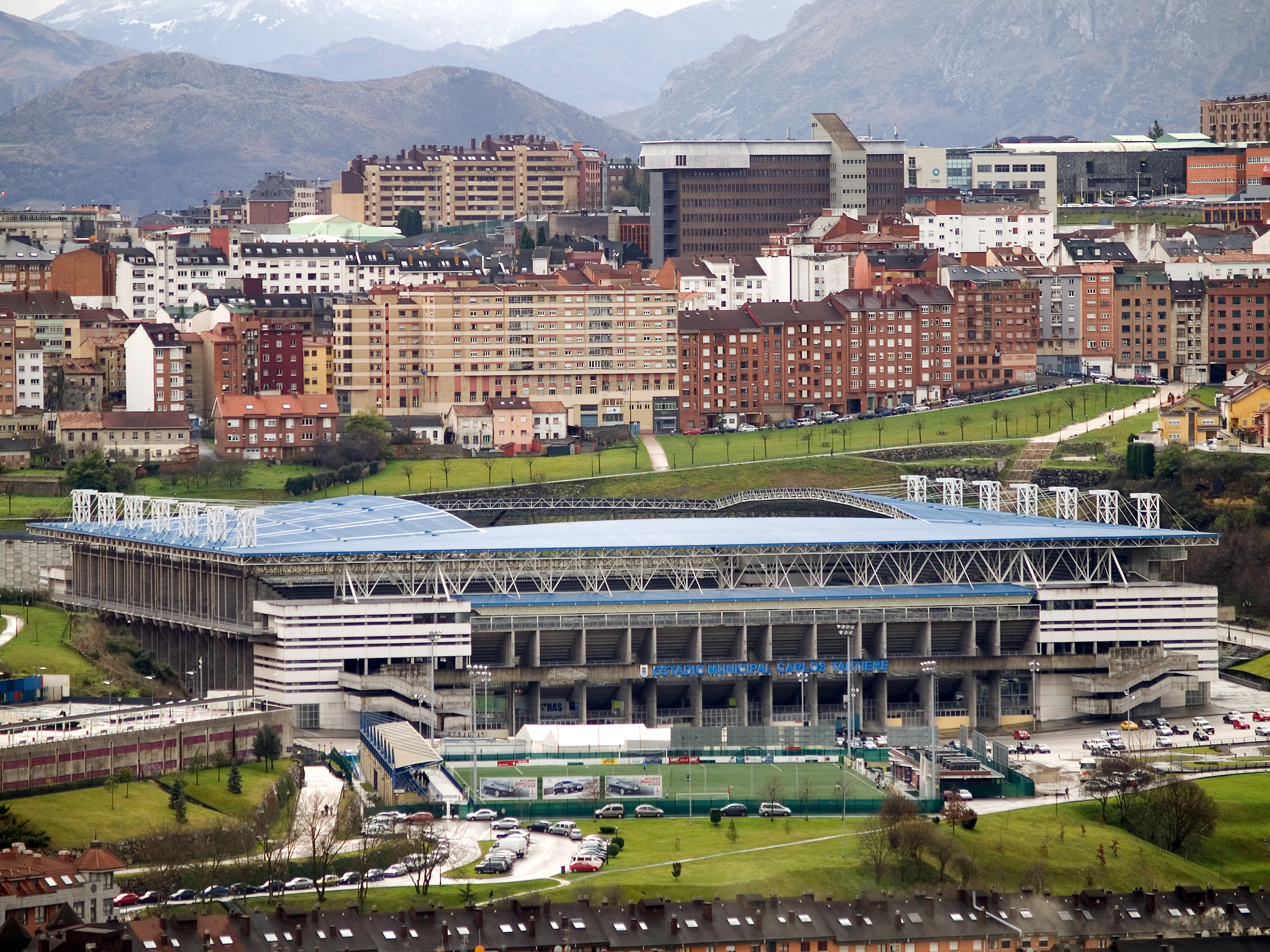
External view.

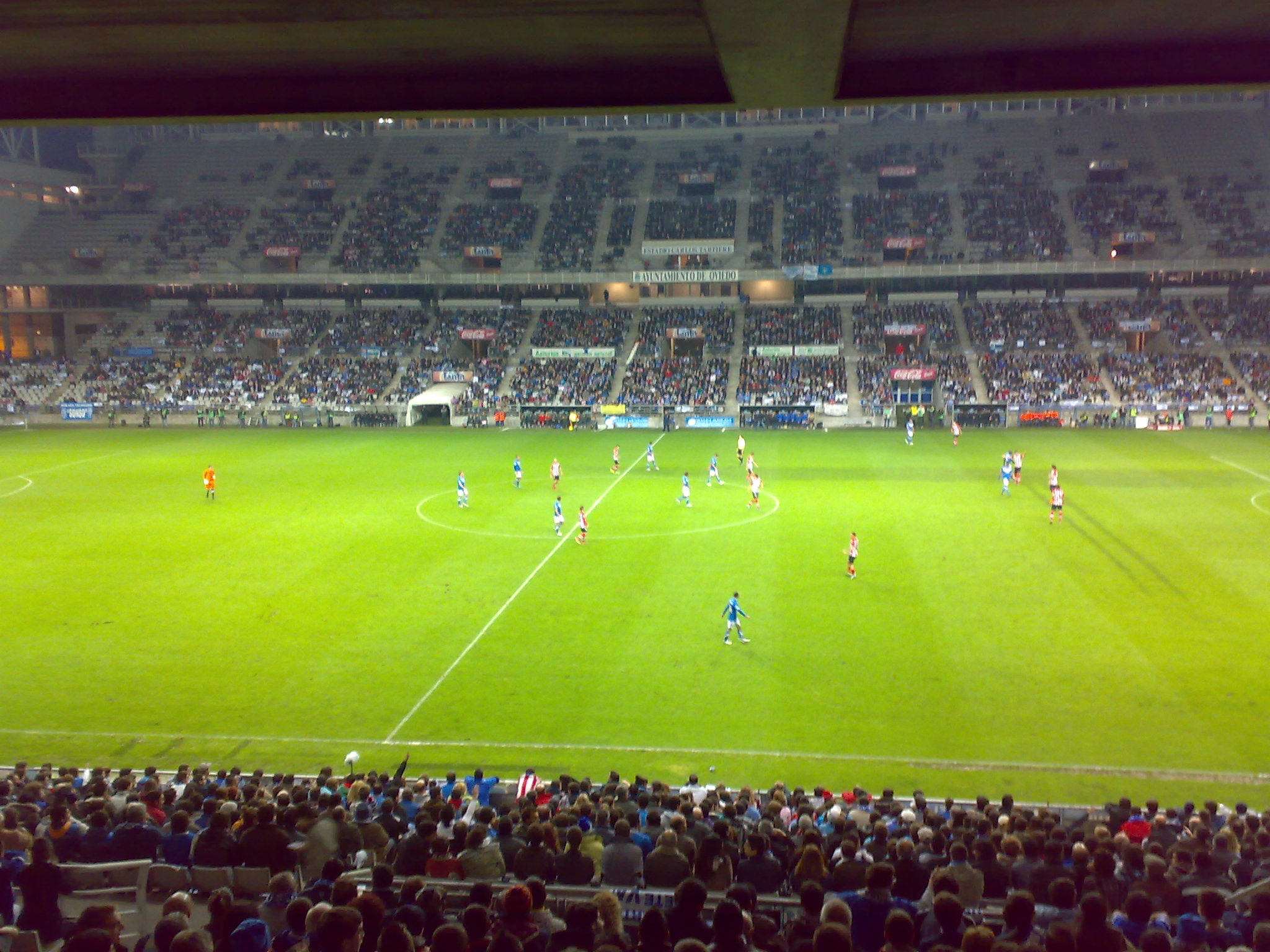
A Copa del Rey match against Athletic Bilbao in December 2011.

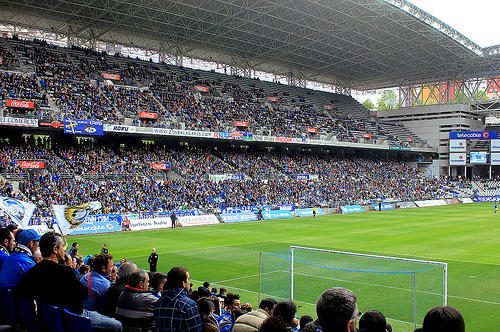
One of the tribunes during a match against Racing Ferrol in March 2015.

Estadio Municipal Carlos Tartiere is a multi-use stadium in Oviedo, Spain. With a capacity of 30,500 seats, it is the 17th-largest stadium in Spain and the largest in Asturias. The new Carlos Tartiere replaced a former stadium (built in 1932) of the same name of the club's first president Carlos Tartiere as the home venue of Real Oviedo. The stadium has held three games of the Spain national football team (the city has held seven in total), one game of the Spain national under-21 team and another one of the Asturian autonomous team.

== History ==
The first stone of the construction was placed on 18 June 1998 and the first match played in this stadium took place on September 17, 2000, a Primera División match between Real Oviedo and Las Palmas. The stadium was officially opened on September 20, 2000, with a friendly match between Real Oviedo and FK Partizan.

The new stadium has been criticised by a number of different sources, especially about its location, which does not have adequate access and emergency exits for large attendances. Furthermore, the pitch is hard to maintain, due to its moist environment and lack of sunlight, especially during the winter. In addition, the large openings in the facade, which make it a cold stadium, are also subject to criticism, as well as its lack of color, with predominance of gray both inside, in the seating area, and outside, by the uncovered facade of concrete. Despite this, Emilio Llano, one of the architects of the stadium, has defended the stadium and claimed that "the problem could be in the grass and not in the subsoil".

The first sold-out match was on 28 October 2001, in the first Asturian derby in the new stadium. Sporting de Gijón won that game by a score of 0–2.

On 24 May 2009, Real Oviedo beat the attendance record in a Tercera División game with 27,214 spectators. It was in the first leg of the 2009 Group Winners play-off against RCD Mallorca B, and the blues won 1–0.

== International matches ==
The first international game was held on 23 December 2000, when the autonomous team Asturias played a friendly game against Macedonia. 25,000 people were in attendance at the game, which finished 1–0 with a goal from Juanele.

Spain has played three times in the new Carlos Tartiere. The first time, on 6 June 2001, against Bosnia and Herzegovina in a game which finished in a 4–1 Spanish victory and the second, on 12 September 2007, against Latvia, finishing with a 2–0 home win. On 5 September 2015 in UEFA Euro 2016 qualifying, Spain won against Slovakia 2–0.

In 2011, the Spain national under-21 football team played an official game against Poland, winning 2–0.

=== Spain matches at Carlos Tartiere ===
Data	Opponent	Score	Competition	Att.
2 June 2001	Bosnia and Herzegovina	4–1	2002 FIFA World Cup qualification	28,000
12 September 2007	Latvia	2–0	UEFA Euro 2008 qualifying	26,000
5 September 2015	Slovakia	2–0	UEFA Euro 2016 qualifying	24,000
3 October 2026	Czech Republic	3–1	2026–27 UEFA Nations League	28,515

== League attendances ==
This is a list of league and playoffs games attendances of Real Oviedo at the new Carlos Tartiere stadium.

The new stadium was closed off for one game after a game against Sporting de Gijón in the 2002–03 season. The game outside this stadium is not included in the stats. It was played at Estadio Román Suárez Puerta in Avilés in front of 1,500 fans against Levante in the last fixture of the season, when Oviedo had already dropped to Segunda División B. In addition, matches played behind closed doors due to the COVID-19 pandemic are not included.

Season	Total	High	Low	Average
2000–01 La Liga	452,200	29,000	16,500	23,800
2001–02 Segunda División	319,050	30,500	7,531	15,193
2002–03 Segunda División	221,797	12,898	7,180	11,090
2003–04 Tercera División	149,900	20,127	3,867	7,138
2004–05 Tercera División	154,643	21,000	4,321	7,364
2005–06 Segunda División B	120,188	8,622	3,879	6,326
2006–07 Segunda División B	98,912	6,935	1,000	5,206
2007–08 Tercera División	111,090	23,915	1,000	5,847
2008–09 Tercera División	117,504	27,214	4,000	5,875
2009–10 Segunda División B	174,330	20,136	5,983	8,717
2010–11 Segunda División B	115,690	8,557	4,354	6,089
2011–12 Segunda División B	126,481	10,121	5,095	6,657
2012–13 Segunda División B	213,221	20,635	5,650	10,153
2013–14 Segunda División B	145,521	15,132	4,506	8,085
2014–15 Segunda División B	289,205	30,500	8,759	13,772
2015–16 Segunda División	291,670	22,634	8,137	13,889
2016–17 Segunda División	284,508	18,281	8,098	13,548
2017–18 Segunda División	294,062	25,996	10,312	14,003
2018–19 Segunda División	282,031	23,175	5,683	13,430
2019–20 Segunda División (Note: Matches played under closed doors not included.)	196,999	20,499	8,667	13,133
2020–21 Segunda División	Season played under closed doors			
2021–22 Segunda División (Note: Some matches played with limited attendance.)	225,586	21,729	5,969	10,742
2022–23 Segunda División	285,581	24,574	9,110	13,599
2023–24 Segunda División	435,684	29,297	12,119	18,943
2024–25 Segunda División	489,671	29,624	16,275	21,290
2025–26 La Liga	464,015	29,850	19,134	24,422
