= Borja Sánchez (footballer, born 1996) =

Spanish footballer

Personal information
- Full name: Borja Sánchez Laborde
- Date of birth: 26 February 1996 (age 30)
- Place of birth: Oviedo, Spain
- Height: 1.84 m (6 ft 0 in)
- Position: Attacking midfielder

Team information
- Current team: Gimnàstic

Youth career
- 2007–2008: Juventud Estadio
- 2008–2011: Astur
- 2011–2012: Oviedo
- 2012–2015: Real Madrid

Senior career*
Years	Team	Apps	(Gls)
2015–2018	Real Madrid B	1	(0)
2015–2016	→ Fuenlabrada (loan)	28	(5)
2017	→ Mallorca B (loan)	14	(0)
2017–2018	→ Oviedo B (loan)	29	(7)
2018–2019	Oviedo B	34	(6)
2018–2025	Oviedo	150	(16)
2023	→ León (loan)	10	(1)
2024–2025	→ Burgos (loan)	31	(4)
2026	Lugo	10	(0)
2026–	Gimnàstic	0	(0)

International career
2012	Spain U16	4	(1)
- * Club domestic league appearances and goals as of 9 June 2026

Borja Sánchez Laborde (born 26 February 1996) is a Spanish footballer who plays as an attacking midfielder for Gimnàstic de Tarragona.

== Club career ==
Born in Oviedo, Asturias, Sánchez joined Real Madrid's youth system in 2011, aged 15, from hometown Real Oviedo. On 29 July 2015, after finishing his graduation, he was loaned to Segunda División B side CF Fuenlabrada, for one year.

Sánchez made his senior debut on 23 August 2015, coming on as a second-half substitute for Jean Carlos in a 3–0 away win against Getafe CF B. His first goal came on 25 October, netting his team's third in a 3–3 draw at CD Ebro.

A regular starter under Fernando Morientes, Sánchez returned to Castilla in July 2016, but was rarely used. On 31 January 2017, he moved to another reserve team, RCD Mallorca B also in the third division, on loan until the end of the season.

On 4 August 2017, Sánchez returned to Oviedo, signing a one-year loan deal and being assigned to the B-team in Tercera División. On 13 July 2018, after achieving promotion to the third level, he signed a permanent contract with the club after terminating his link with Real Madrid.

Sánchez made his first-team debut on 28 October 2018, replacing Joselu in a 1–2 away defeat to Gimnàstic de Tarragona in the Segunda División championship. The following 29 January, he renewed his contract until 2022, being definitely promoted to the main squad for the following campaign.

Sánchez scored his first professional goal on 13 October 2019, netting the winner in a 2–1 away defeat of Albacete Balompié. On 3 July 2023, after being regularly used in the main squad, he was loaned to Liga MX side Club León.

On 6 January 2024, Oviedo announced Sánchez's return, with a contract extension until 2026. On 30 August, however, he was loaned to fellow second division side Burgos CF on a one-year deal.

Upon returning, Sánchez made his La Liga debut on 15 August 2025, in a 2–0 away loss to Villarreal CF, but terminated his link fourteen days later. He then spent nearly seven months without a club before signing for CD Lugo in Primera Federación on 9 February 2026.

On 14 July 2026, Sánchez signed a one-year contract with Gimnàstic de Tarragona also in the third division.
