= 2022–23 Real Oviedo season =

Real Oviedo
2022–23 season
- President: Martín Peláez
- Head coach: Bolo (until 16 October); Álvaro Cervera (from 16 October)
- Stadium: Carlos Tartiere
- Segunda División: 9th
- Copa del Rey: Round of 32
- Top goalscorer: League: Borja Bastón (8); All: Borja Bastón (10)
Home colours	Away colours	Third colours
- All statistics correct as of 6 December 2022.

The 2022–23 season is the 97th season in the history of Real Oviedo and their eighth consecutive season in the second division. The club are participating in Segunda División and the Copa del Rey.

== Players ==
As of 25 August 2022

Note: Flags indicate national team as defined under FIFA eligibility rules; some limited exceptions apply. Players may hold more than one non-FIFA nationality.

No.	Pos.	Nation	Player
1	GK	FRA	Quentin Braat
2	DF	ESP	Miguelón (on loan from Espanyol)
3	DF	ESP	Rodrigo Tarín
4	DF	ESP	David Costas
5	MF	ESP	Luismi
6	MF	ESP	Javi Mier
7	MF	ESP	Viti Rozada
8	MF	ESP	Marco Sangalli
9	FW	ESP	Borja Bastón (captain)
10	MF	ESP	Borja Sánchez
11	MF	MEX	Marcelo Flores (on loan from Arsenal)
12	DF	ESP	Dani Calvo

No.	Pos.	Nation	Player
13	GK	ESP	Tomeu Nadal
14	MF	ESP	Jimmy
15	DF	ESP	Oier Luengo
16	FW	GHA	Samuel Obeng
17	DF	MEX	Daniel Aceves (on loan from Pachuca)
18	MF	NCL	Koba Koindredi (on loan from Valencia)
19	MF	ESP	Ángel Montoro
20	MF	ESP	Hugo Rama
21	DF	ESP	Carlos Pomares
23	FW	ESP	Sergi Enrich
24	DF	ESP	Lucas Ahijado

=== Reserve team ===
Note: Flags indicate national team as defined under FIFA eligibility rules; some limited exceptions apply. Players may hold more than one non-FIFA nationality.

No.	Pos.	Nation	Player
26	GK	ESP	Marco Coronas
27	MF	ESP	Álex Cardero
28	DF	ESP	Abel Bretones
29	DF	ESP	Javi Moreno
30	DF	ESP	Lucas Laso
31	MF	ESP	Mangel Prendes

No.	Pos.	Nation	Player
32	DF	ESP	Osky Menéndez
33	FW	ESP	Mario Fuente
34	MF	ESP	Yayo González
36	MF	ESP	Víctor Blanco
37	FW	ESP	Mario Sesé

=== Out on loan ===
Note: Flags indicate national team as defined under FIFA eligibility rules; some limited exceptions apply. Players may hold more than one non-FIFA nationality.

No.	Pos.	Nation	Player
—	DF	FRA	Pierre Cornud (at Maccabi Haifa until 30 June 2023)

== Transfers ==
=== In ===
Date	Player	From	Type	Fee	Ref
1 July 2022	(France) Quentin Braat	(France) Chamois Niortais	Transfer	Free	
11 July 2022	(Spain) Miguelón	Espanyol	Loan		
25 August 2022	(New Caledonia) Koba Koindredi	Valencia	Loan		

=== Out ===
Date	Player	To	Type	Fee	Ref
1 July 2022	(Spain) Joan Femenías	Levante	Transfer	Free	

== Pre-season and friendlies ==
Win Draw Loss Fixtures

20 July 2022 Friendly	Racing Ferrol	0–0 (3–2 p)	Oviedo
CEST (UTC+2)

23 July 2022 Friendly	Oviedo	0–0	Eibar
CEST (UTC+2)

27 July 2022 Friendly	Oviedo	0–1	Burgos
CEST (UTC+2)

30 July 2022 Friendly	Alavés	0–0	Oviedo
CEST (UTC+2)

3 August 2022 Friendly	Real Avilés	1–2	Oviedo
CEST (UTC+2)

6 August 2022 Friendly	Racing Santander	0–0	Oviedo
CEST (UTC+2)

== Competitions ==
=== Overall record ===
Competition	First match	Last match	Starting round	Record							
Competition	First match	Last match	Starting round	Pld	W	D	L	GF	GA	GD	Win %
Segunda División	15 August 2022		Matchday 1	40	15	11	14	32	33	−1	37.50
Copa del Rey	13 November 2022	4 January 2023	Second round	2	1	0	1	3	4	−1	50.00
Total				42	16	11	15	35	37	−2	38.10

Last updated: 13 May 2023
Source: Soccerway

=== Segunda División ===
==== League table ====
Pos	Team	Pld	W	D	L	GF	GA	GD	Pts	Qualification or relegation
6	Albacete	42	17	16	9	58	47	+11	67	Qualification for promotion play-offs
7	Andorra	42	16	11	15	47	37	+10	59 (Note: Andorra finished ahead of Oviedo on head-to-head points: Oviedo 0–1 Andorra, Andorra 3–1 Oviedo.)	
8	Oviedo	42	16	11	15	34	35	−1	59	
9	Cartagena	42	16	10	16	47	49	−2	58	
10	Tenerife	42	14	15	13	42	37	+5	57	

Source: LaLiga SmartBank
Rules for classification: 1) points; 2) head-to-head points; 3) head-to-head goal difference; 4) goal difference; 5) number of goals scored
Notes:

Notes

1. Reserve teams are not eligible for promotion to the same league as the first team.

==== Results summary ====
Overall								Home						Away					
Pld	W	D	L	GF	GA	GD	Pts	W	D	L	GF	GA	GD	W	D	L	GF	GA	GD
40	15	11	14	32	33	−1	56	9	5	6	17	15	+2	6	6	8	15	18	−3

Last updated: 13 May 2023.
Source: LaLiga SmartBank

==== Results by round ====
Round	1	2	3	4	5	6	7	8	9	10	11	12	13	14	15	16	17	18	19	20	21	22	23	24	25	26	27	28	29	30	31	32	33	34	35	36	37	38	39	40	41	42
Ground	H	H	A	H	A	H	A	H	A	H	A	H	A	A	H	A	H	A	H	A	H	A	H	A	H	A	H	A	H	A	H	A	A	H	A	H	A	H	H	A	H	A
Result	L	W	W	D	D	L	D	L	D	L	L	W	L	L	W	D	W	W	D	L	W	L	W	D	L	W	L	L	D	L	D	W	L	D	W	W	W	W	W	D		
Position	19	11	8	10	10	14	14	17	17	19	19	16	18	19	17	17	15	14	14	16	14	15	13	14	15	12	12	14	15	18	18	16	16	16	15	14	10	9		8		

Updated to match(es) played on 13 May 2023. Source: LaLiga SmartBank
A = Away; H = Home; W = Win; D = Draw; L = Loss

==== Matches ====
The league fixtures were announced on 23 June 2022.

=== Copa del Rey ===
13 November 2022 First Round	Andratx	2 - 3 (a.e.t.)	Oviedo	Torrelavega
12:00	Óscar Marotíaa 54'; Miquel Llabrés 89'		Bastón 7', 50'; Sangalli 114'	Stadium: Campos del Malecón; Referee: (Spain) Jon Ander González Esteban

22 December 2022 Second Round	Oviedo	1 - 0	Granada	Oviedo
21:00	Luengo 8'			Stadium: Carlos Tartiere; Referee: (Spain) Francisco José Hernández Maeso

4 January 2023 Round of 32	Oviedo	0 - 2	Atlético Madrid	Oviedo
20:00			Llorente 24'; Barrios 83'	Stadium: Carlos Tartiere; Attendance: 27,303; Referee: (Spain) Alejandro Muñiz Ruiz
