= 2023–24 Real Oviedo season =

Real Oviedo
2023–24 season
- President: Martín Peláez
- Head coach: Álvaro Cervera (until 21 September); Luis Carrión (from 21 September)
- Stadium: Estadio Carlos Tartiere
- Segunda División: 6th
- Promotion play-offs: Runners-up
- Copa del Rey: Second round
- Top goalscorer: League: Borja Bastón (10); All: Borja Bastón (10)
- Average home league attendance: 17,974
Home colours	Away colours	Third colours

The 2023–24 season was Real Oviedo's 98th season in existence and ninth consecutive season in the Segunda División, the second division of association football in Spain. They also competed in the Copa del Rey.

== Players ==
=== First-team squad ===
As of 25 August 2023

Note: Flags indicate national team as defined under FIFA eligibility rules; some limited exceptions apply. Players may hold more than one non-FIFA nationality.

No.	Pos.	Nation	Player
1	GK	FRA	Quentin Braat
2	DF	ESP	Mario Hernández
3	DF	ESP	Rodrigo Tarín
4	DF	ESP	David Costas
5	MF	ESP	Luismi
6	MF	ESP	Jimmy
7	MF	ESP	Viti Rozada
8	MF	ESP	Santi Cazorla
9	FW	ESP	Borja Bastón (captain)
10	MF	ESP	Víctor Camarasa
11	MF	ESP	Hugo Rama
12	DF	ESP	Dani Calvo
14	FW	BRA	Alemão (on loan from Pachuca)

No.	Pos.	Nation	Player
15	DF	ESP	Oier Luengo
16	MF	ESP	Jaime Seoane
17	MF	ESP	Sebas Moyano
18	MF	ESP	Paulino de la Fuente (on loan from Pachuca)
19	FW	ESP	Álex Millán
20	FW	POR	Masca
21	DF	ESP	Carlos Pomares
22	FW	ECU	Romario Ibarra (on loan from Pachuca)
23	DF	ESP	Abel Bretones
24	DF	ESP	Lucas Ahijado
31	GK	ESP	Leo Román (on loan from Mallorca)
—	MF	ESP	Javi Mier
—	MF	ARG	Santiago Colombatto (on loan from León)

=== Reserve team ===
Note: Flags indicate national team as defined under FIFA eligibility rules; some limited exceptions apply. Players may hold more than one non-FIFA nationality.

No.	Pos.	Nation	Player
32	MF	ESP	Álex Cardero
34	MF	ESP	Yayo

=== Out on loan ===
Note: Flags indicate national team as defined under FIFA eligibility rules; some limited exceptions apply. Players may hold more than one non-FIFA nationality.

No.	Pos.	Nation	Player
—	MF	ESP	Mangel (at Ponferradina until 30 June 2024)
—	FW	GHA	Samuel Obeng (at Huesca until 30 June 2024)

== Transfers ==
=== In ===
Pos.	Player	Transferred from	Fee	Date	Source
MF	(Spain) Sebas Moyano	(Spain) Lugo	Free	1 July 2023	
FW	(Spain) Álex Millán	(Spain) Villarreal B	Free	1 July 2023	
MF	(Spain) Jaime Seoane	(Spain) Getafe	€2,500,000	4 August 2023	
MF	(Spain) Santi Cazorla	(Qatar) Al-Sadd	Free	16 August 2023	
MF	(Argentina) Santiago Colombatto	(Mexico) Club León	Loan	25 August 2023	

=== Out ===
Pos.	Player	Transferred to	Fee	Date	Source
MF	(Spain) Borja Sánchez	(Mexico) Club León	€375,000	3 July 2023	
FW	(Spain) Sergi Enrich	(Spain) Zaragoza	Free	19 July 2023	
MF	(Spain) Ángel Montoro	(Spain) Real Murcia	Free	4 August 2023	
MF	(Spain) Hugo Rama	(Spain) Deportivo La Coruña		1 September 2023	

== Pre-season and friendlies ==
Win Draw Loss Fixtures

== Competitions ==
=== Overall record ===
Competition	First match	Last match	Starting round	Final position	Record							
Competition	First match	Last match	Starting round	Final position	Pld	W	D	L	GF	GA	GD	Win %
Segunda División	14 August 2023	2 June 2024	Matchday 1	6th	42	17	13	12	55	39	+16	40.48
Copa del Rey	1 November 2023	5 December 2023	First round	Second round	2	1	0	1	3	3	+0	50.00
Total					44	18	13	13	58	42	+16	40.91

Source: Soccerway

=== Segunda División ===
==== League table ====
Pos	Team	Pld	W	D	L	GF	GA	GD	Pts	Qualification or relegation
4	Espanyol (O, P)	42	17	18	7	59	40	+19	69	Qualification for promotion play-offs
5	Sporting Gijón	42	18	11	13	51	42	+9	65	Qualification for promotion play-offs
6	Oviedo	42	17	13	12	55	39	+16	64 (Note: Oviedo finished ahead of Racing Santander on overall goal difference)	Qualification for promotion play-offs
7	Racing Santander	42	18	10	14	63	55	+8	64	
8	Levante	42	13	20	9	49	45	+4	59 (Note: Levante finished ahead of Burgos, Racing Ferrol, and Elche on head-to-head points: Levante 12 pts, Burgos 8 pts, Racing Ferrol 8 pts, Elche 4 pts. Burgos finished ahead of Racing Ferrol on head-to-head points: Racing Ferrol 1–1 Burgos, Burgos 2–0 Racing Ferrol)	

Updated to match(es) played on 2 Jun 2024. Source: LaLiga HyperMotion
Rules for classification: 1) Points; 2) Head-to-head points; 3) Head-to-head goal difference; 4) Goal difference; 5) Goals scored; 6) Fair-play points
(Note: Head-to-head record is used only after all the matches between the teams in question have been played)
(O) Play-off winners; (P) Promoted

==== Results summary ====
Overall								Home						Away					
Pld	W	D	L	GF	GA	GD	Pts	W	D	L	GF	GA	GD	W	D	L	GF	GA	GD
42	17	13	12	55	39	+16	64	12	7	2	34	14	+20	5	6	10	21	25	−4

Source: LaLiga.com

==== Results by round ====
Round	1	2	3	4	5	6	7	8	9	10	11	12	13	14	15	16	17	18	19	20	21	22	23	24	25	26	27	28	29	30	31	32	33	34	35	36	37	38	39	40	41	42
Ground	A	H	A	A	H	A	H	A	H	A	H	A	H	A	H	H	A	H	A	H	A	H	A	H	H	A	H	A	H	A	H	A	H	A	H	A	H	A	H	A	H	A
Result	L	D	L	D	D	L	L	W	W	D	W	D	W	D	D	W	L	W	D	W	D	D	W	W	D	L	W	L	W	W	D	L	W	W	D	L	L	W	W	L	W	L
Position	15	18	21	22	19	21	21	20	17	16	13	13	12	13	14	12	12	11	11	10	10	11	8	7	8	10	7	10	8	7	7	9	7	5	5	6	6	5	5	6	5	6

Source: LaLiga.com
A = Away; H = Home; W = Win; D = Draw; L = Loss

==== Matches ====
The league fixtures were unveiled on 28 June 2023.

14 August 2023 1	Tenerife	1–0	Oviedo	Santa Cruz de Tenerife
20:30 WEST (UTC+1)	Gallego 18'	Report		Stadium: Estadio Heliodoro Rodríguez López; Attendance: 15,861; Referee: Saúl Ais Reig

20 August 2023 2	Oviedo	1–1	Racing Ferrol	Oviedo
17:00 CEST (UTC+2)	Camarasa 47'	Report	Señé 32' (pen.)	Stadium: Estadio Carlos Tartiere; Attendance: 17,102; Referee: Daniel Jesús Trujillo Suárez

26 August 2023 3	Burgos	1–0	Oviedo	Burgos
17:00 CEST (UTC+2)	Niño 14', (yellow card) 71'; Grego (yellow card) 45+4'; Matos (yellow card) 88'; Sánchez (yellow card) 90+1'	Report	Seoane (yellow card) 9' (yellow-red card) 40'; Costas (yellow card) 34'; Calvo (yellow card) 60'	Stadium: El Plantío; Attendance: 9,854; Referee: Dámaso Arcediano Monescillo

2 September 2023 4	Levante	1–1	Oviedo	Valencia
18:30 CEST (UTC+2)	Bouldini 63'	Report	Bastón 47'	Stadium: Estadi Ciutat de València; Attendance: 13,844; Referee: Luis Mario Milla Alvendiz

9 September 2023 5	Oviedo	0–0	Sporting Gijón	Oviedo
18:30 CEST (UTC+2)		Report		Stadium: Estadio Carlos Tartiere; Attendance: 22,121; Referee: Adrián Cordero Vega

18 September 2023 6	Andorra	1–0	Oviedo	Andorra la Vella
21:00 CEST (UTC+2)	Lobete 81' (pen.)	Report		Stadium: Estadi Nacional; Attendance: 1,820; Referee: Óliver de la Fuente Ramos

24 September 2023 7	Oviedo	0–1	Valladolid	Oviedo
16:15 CEST (UTC+2)		Report	Marcos André 90+2'	Stadium: Estadio Carlos Tartiere; Attendance: 16,955; Referee: Jon Ander González Esteban

1 October 2023 8	Eldense	1–3	Oviedo	Elda
14:00 CEST (UTC+2)	Salcedo 80' (pen.); Soberón (yellow card) 82'	Report	Bretones 6'; De la Fuente 14'; Bastón 25'	Stadium: Nuevo Pepico Amat; Attendance: 4,050; Referee: Salvador Lax Franco

4 October 2023 9	Oviedo	1–0	Huesca	Oviedo
19:00 CEST (UTC+2)	Moyano 82'	Report		Stadium: Estadio Carlos Tartiere; Referee: Germán Cid Camacho

7 October 2023 10	Leganés	0–0	Oviedo	Leganés
21:00 CEST (UTC+2)		Report		Stadium: Estadio Municipal de Butarque; Referee: Rubén Ávalos Barrera

13 October 2023 11	Oviedo	3–0	Albacete	Oviedo
21:00 CEST (UTC+2)		Report		Stadium: Estadio Carlos Tartiere

29 October 2023 13	Oviedo	2–0	AD Alcorcon	Oviedo
18:30 CET (UTC+1)				Stadium: Estadio Carlos Tartiere

13 November 2023 15	Oviedo	1–1	Cartagena	Oviedo
21:00 CET (UTC+1)				Stadium: Estadio Carlos Tartiere

19 November 2023 16	Oviedo	2–1	Eibar	Oviedo
16:15 CET (UTC+1)				Stadium: Estadio Carlos Tartiere

1 December 2023 18	Oviedo	2–0	Espanyol	Oviedo
20:30 CET (UTC+1)				Stadium: Estadio Carlos Tartiere

10 December 2023 19	Racing Santander	2–2	Oviedo	Santander
16:15 CET (UTC+1)				Stadium: El Sardinero

15 December 2023 20	Oviedo	3–2	Elche	Oviedo
20:30 CET (UTC+1)				Stadium: Estadio Carlos Tartiere

21 December 2023 21	Villarreal B	1–1	Oviedo	Villarreal
19:00 CET (UTC+1)	Forés 9'; Del Moral (yellow card) 42'		Luengo (yellow card) 64'; Calvo (yellow card) 69' (yellow-red card) 90+6'; Bretones (yellow card) 70'; Cardero 90+3'	Stadium: Estadio de la Cerámica; Referee: Dámaso Arcediano Monescillo

20 January 2024 23	Racing Ferrol	1–3	Oviedo	Ferrol
21:00 CET (UTC+1)	Losada 48'		Mascarenhas 57'; Moyano 70'; Alemão 90+14'	Stadium: Estadio Municipal da Malata; Referee: Adrián Cordero Vega

4 February 2024 25	Oviedo	1–1	Eldense	Oviedo
16:15	Bastón 71' (pen.)		Chapela 23'; Đumić (red card) 70'	Stadium: Estadio Carlos Tartiere; Referee: José Luis Guzmán Mansilla

10 February 2024 26	Sporting Gijón	1–0	Oviedo	Gijón
18:30 CET (UTC+1)	Méndez 2'			Stadium: El Molinón; Referee: Jon Ander González Esteban

17 February 2024 27	Oviedo	5–0	Burgos	Oviedo
16:15	Moyano 15', 45', 50'; Seoane 43'; Bastón 88' (pen.)			Stadium: Estadio Carlos Tartiere; Referee: Saúl Ais Reig

23 February 2024 28	Valladolid	3–0	Oviedo	Valladolid
20:30 CET (UTC+1)	Monchu 18'; Ndiaye 48', 59'			Stadium: Estadio José Zorrilla; Referee: Rubén Ávalos Barrera

2 March 2024 29	Oviedo	3–2	Levante	Oviedo
18:30				Stadium: Estadio Carlos Tartiere

5 April 2024 34	Elche	0–2	Oviedo	Elche
				Stadium: Estadio Martínez Valero

14 April 2024 35	Oviedo	1–1	Mirandés	Oviedo
				Stadium: Estadio Carlos Tartiere

22 April 2024 36	Cartagena	2–0	Oviedo	Cartagena
				Stadium: Estadio Cartagonova

28 April 2024 37	Oviedo	0–1	Tenerife	Oviedo
				Stadium: Estadio Carlos Tartiere

4 May 2024 38	Huesca	0–2	Oviedo	Huesca
				Stadium: Estadio El Alcoraz

12 May 2024 39	Oviedo	1–0	Zaragoza	Oviedo
				Stadium: Estadio Carlos Tartiere

20 May 2024 40	Espanyol	2–1	Oviedo	Cornellá/El Prat
				Stadium: Stage Front Stadium

26 May 2024 41	Oviedo	3–0	Andorra	Oviedo
				Stadium: Estadio Carlos Tartiere

2 June 2024 42	Eibar	4–3	Oviedo	Eibar
				Stadium: Ipurua Municipal Stadium

==== Promotion play-offs ====
8 June 2024 Semi-finals; First leg	Oviedo	0–0	Eibar	Oviedo
18:30	Sánchez (yellow card) 61'; Viti (yellow card) 72'; Dubasin (yellow card) 89'	Report	Stoichkov (yellow card) 6'	Stadium: Estadio Carlos Tartiere; Attendance: 28,126; Referee: Alejandro Quintero González

12 June 2024 Semi-finals; Second leg	Eibar	0–2 (0–2 agg.)	Oviedo	Eibar
21:00	Aketxe (yellow card) 58'; Qasmi (yellow card) 82'; Matheus Pereira (yellow card) 90+2'	Report	Seoane (yellow card) 31'; Alemão 59'; Moyano 79'; Bretones (yellow card) 87'	Stadium: Ipurua Municipal Stadium; Attendance: 7,732; Referee: Iosu Galech Apezteguía

16 June 2024 Final; First leg	Oviedo	1–0	Espanyol	Oviedo
18:30	Luismi (yellow card) 67'; Alemão 72'	Report	Óscar Gil (yellow card) 71'; Baldé (yellow card) 87'	Stadium: Estadio Carlos Tartiere; Attendance: 29,297; Referee: Dámaso Arcediano Monescillo

23 June 2024 Final; Second leg	Espanyol	2–0 (2–1 agg.)	Oviedo	Cornellá/El Prat
18:30	Cabrera (yellow card) 21'; Moyano (yellow card) 28'; Puado 44', 45+2'; Bare (yellow card) 47'; Milla (yellow card) 64'	Report	Viti (yellow card) 40'; Seoane (yellow card) 73'	Stadium: Stage Front Stadium; Attendance: 33,107; Referee: Adrián Cordero Vega

=== Copa del Rey ===
1 November 2023 First round	Manresa	1–2 (a.e.t.)	Oviedo	Manresa
20:00	Baquero 24'		Masca 3', 112'	Stadium: Nou Estadi Municipal; Referee: Iosu Galech Apezteguía

5 December 2023 Second round	Castellón	2–1	Oviedo	Castellón de la Plana
21:00	Suero 40'; Grønning 49'	Report	Alemão 56'	Stadium: Nou Estadi Castàlia; Attendance: 11,258; Referee: Óliver de la Fuente Ramos

== Statistics ==
=== Goalscorers ===
Position	Players	Segunda División	Play-offs	Copa del Rey	Total
FW	(Spain) Borja Bastón	10	0	0	10
MF	(Spain) Paulino de la Fuente	9	0	0	9
MF	(Spain) Sebas Moyano	8	1	0	9
FW	(Brazil) Alemão	5	2	1	8
FW	(Portugal) Masca	5	0	2	7
MF	(Spain) Jaime Seoane	4	0	0	4
MF	(Argentina) Santiago Colombatto	3	0	0	3
