= 2021–22 Real Oviedo season =

Real Oviedo
2021–22 season
- Owner: Grupo Carso
- President: Jorge Menéndez Vallina
- Head coach: José Ángel Ziganda
- Stadium: Carlos Tartiere
- Segunda División: 7th
- Copa del Rey: First round
- Top goalscorer: League: Borja Baston (17); All: Borja Baston (17)
Home colours	colours	colours

The 2021–22 season was the 96th season in the existence of Real Oviedo and the club's seventh consecutive season in the second division of Spanish football. In addition to the domestic league, Oviedo participated in this season's edition of the Copa del Rey.

== Players ==
=== First-team squad ===
As of 2 February 2022

Note: Flags indicate national team as defined under FIFA eligibility rules; some limited exceptions apply. Players may hold more than one non-FIFA nationality.

No.	Pos.	Nation	Player
1	GK	ESP	Joan Femenías
2	MF	ESP	Hugo Rama
3	DF	ESP	Rodrigo Tarín
4	DF	ESP	David Costas
5	MF	ESP	Luismi
6	MF	ESP	Javi Mier
7	MF	ESP	Viti Rozada
8	MF	ESP	Marco Sangalli
9	FW	ESP	Borja Bastón
10	MF	ESP	Borja Sánchez
11	MF	SVK	Erik Jirka
12	DF	ESP	Dani Calvo

No.	Pos.	Nation	Player
13	GK	ESP	Tomeu Nadal
14	MF	ESP	Jimmy
15	MF	URU	Gastón Brugman (on loan from Parma)
16	FW	GHA	Samuel Obeng
17	MF	ESP	Joni Montiel (on loan from Rayo Vallecano)
18	DF	ESP	Christian Fernández
19	FW	BRA	Matheus Aiás (on loan from Orlando City)
20	FW	ESP	Jorge Pombo (on loan from Cádiz)
21	DF	ESP	Carlos Isaac (on loan from Alavés)
22	DF	FRA	Pierre Cornud
23	DF	ESP	Mossa (captain)
24	DF	ESP	Lucas Ahijado

=== Reserve team ===
Note: Flags indicate national team as defined under FIFA eligibility rules; some limited exceptions apply. Players may hold more than one non-FIFA nationality.

No.	Pos.	Nation	Player
26	GK	ESP	Berto Hórreo
27	MF	ESP	Álex Suárez
28	DF	ESP	Javi Moreno
29	FW	ESP	Javi Cueto
30	MF	ESP	Guille Bernabéu

No.	Pos.	Nation	Player
31	MF	ESP	Yayo
32	DF	ESP	René Pérez
33	MF	ESP	Joselu Guerra
36	FW	ESP	Mario Fuente
37	MF	ESP	Mangel

=== Out on loan ===
Note: Flags indicate national team as defined under FIFA eligibility rules; some limited exceptions apply. Players may hold more than one non-FIFA nationality.

No.	Pos.	Nation	Player
—	DF	ESP	Jorge Mier (at Unionistas de Salamanca until 30 June 2022)
—	MF	ESP	Riki (at Albacete until 30 June 2022)

== Pre-season and friendlies ==
Win Draw Loss

21 July 2021 Friendly	Oviedo	Cancelled	Extremadura	Navia, Spain
19:00 CEST (UTC+2)				Stadium: Estadio El Pardo

21 July 2021 Friendly	Oviedo	2–0	Rayo Majadahonda	Navia, Spain
19:00 CEST (UTC+2)				Stadium: Estadio El Pardo

24 July 2021 Friendly	Real Avilés	0–1	Oviedo	Avilés, Spain
19:00 CEST (UTC+2)				Stadium: Estadio Román Suárez Puerta

28 July 2021 Friendly	Cultural Leonesa	2–1	Oviedo	León, Spain
18:30 CEST (UTC+2)				Stadium: Área Deportiva de Puente Castro

31 July 2021 Friendly	Lugo	1–1 (5–4 p)	Oviedo	Ribadeo, Spain
17:30 CEST (UTC+2)				Stadium: Estadio Municipal Pepe Barrera

7 August 2021 Friendly	Ponferradina	1–0	Oviedo	Ponferrada, Spain
19:00 CEST (UTC+2)	Espiau 87'			Stadium: El Toralín

== Competitions ==
=== Overall record ===
Competition	First match	Last match	Starting round	Final position	Record							
Competition	First match	Last match	Starting round	Final position	Pld	W	D	L	GF	GA	GD	Win %
Segunda División	15 August 2021	May 2022	Matchday 1		42	17	17	8	57	41	+16	40.48
Copa del Rey	1 December 2021		First round	First round	1	0	0	1	1	2	−1	0.00
Total					43	17	17	9	58	43	+15	39.53

Source: Soccerway

=== Segunda División ===
==== League table ====
Pos	Team	Pld	W	D	L	GF	GA	GD	Pts	Qualification or relegation
5	Tenerife	42	20	9	13	53	37	+16	69	Qualification for promotion play-offs
6	Girona (O, P)	42	20	8	14	57	42	+15	68 (Note: Girona finished ahead of Oviedo on head-to-head points: Girona 2–1 Oviedo, Oviedo 0–0 Girona.)	Qualification for promotion play-offs
7	Oviedo	42	17	17	8	57	41	+16	68	
8	Ponferradina	42	17	12	13	57	55	+2	63	
9	Cartagena	42	18	6	18	63	57	+6	60	

Source: LaLiga SmartBank
Rules for classification: 1) points; 2) head-to-head points; 3) head-to-head goal difference; 4) goal difference; 5) number of goals scored
(O) Play-off winners; (P) Promoted

==== Results summary ====
Overall								Home						Away					
Pld	W	D	L	GF	GA	GD	Pts	W	D	L	GF	GA	GD	W	D	L	GF	GA	GD
42	17	17	8	57	41	+16	68	11	8	2	38	19	+19	6	9	6	19	22	−3

Source: La Liga SmartBank

==== Results by round ====
Round	1	2	3	4	5	6	7	8	9	10	11	12	13	14	15	16	17	18	19	20	21	22	23	24	25	26	27	28	29	30	31	32	33	34	35	36	37	38	39	40	41	42
Ground	H	A	H	A	H	A	H	A	H	A	H	A	H	A	H	A	H	A	H	A	A	H	H	A	H	A	H	A	H	A	H	A	H	A	H	A	A	H	A	H	A	H
Result	D	L	D	W	W	D	D	D	D	D	L	W	W	L	D	D	W	D	W	L	D	W	D	L	W	D	D	W	L	L	W	D	W	W	W	W	W	W	D	D	L	W
Position	8	15	17	11	5	5	11	10	11	13	14	10	8	11	11	13	10	9	7	8	9	9	9	10	9	9	10	7	8	10	7	8	7	7	6	6	6	6	6	5	7	7

Source: La Liga SmartBank
A = Away; H = Home; W = Win; D = Draw; L = Loss

==== Matches ====
The league fixtures were announced on 30 June 2021.

15 August 2021 1	Oviedo	2 – 2	Lugo	Oviedo
19:30 CEST (UTC+2)	Viti 30'; Obeng 33'	Report	Carrillo 78'; Joselu 89' (pen.)	Stadium: Carlos Tartiere; Attendance: 5,769; Referee: Alejandro Quintero González

20 August 2021 2	Almería	2 – 1	Oviedo	Almería
22:00 CEST (UTC+2)	Lazo 5'; Samú (yellow card) 19'; Robertone 47'	Report	Obeng 15'; Calvo (yellow card) 20'; Mier (yellow card) 58'; Montiel (yellow card) 90+3'	Stadium: Estadio de los Juegos Mediterráneos; Referee: Francisco José Hernández Maeso

28 August 2021 3	Oviedo	0 – 0	Tenerife	Oviedo
19:30 CEST (UTC+2)		Report		Stadium: Carlos Tartiere; Referee: José Antonio López Toca

6 September 2021 4	Huesca	1 – 2	Oviedo	Huesca
21:00 CEST (UTC+2)	Escriche 63'	Report	Bastón 12'; Obeng 80'	Stadium: El Alcoraz; Referee: Eduardo Prieto Iglesias

12 September 2021 5	Oviedo	2 – 0	Cartagena	Oviedo
14:00 CEST (UTC+2)	Bastón 45+3' (pen.); Andújar 57' (o.g.)	Report		Stadium: Carlos Tartiere; Referee: Iosu Galech Apezteguía

18 September 2021 6	Ibiza	1 – 1	Oviedo	Ibiza
16:00 CEST (UTC+2)				Stadium: Can Misses

26 September 2021 7	Oviedo	0 – 0	Girona	Oviedo
18:15 CEST (UTC+2)	Borja Sánchez (yellow card) 71'; Obeng (red card) 89'; Jorge Pombo (yellow card) 90+2'; Jirka (yellow card) 90+8'	Report	Álex Baena (yellow card) 41'; Jairo Izquierdo (yellow card) 70'	Stadium: Carlos Tartiere; Attendance: 9,163; Referee: (Spain) David Gálvez Rascón

2 October 2021 8	Real Zaragoza	0 – 0	Oviedo	Zaragoza
18:15 CEST (UTC+2)	Íñigo Eguaras (yellow card) 19'; Narváez (yellow card) 88'	Report	Dani Calvo (yellow card) 36'; Jimmy Suárez (yellow card) 54'; Mossa (yellow card) 58'; Brugman (yellow card) 80'; Matheus Aiás (yellow card) 85'; David Costas (yellow card) 88'	Stadium: La Romareda; Attendance: 16,889; Referee: (Spain) Luis Milla Alvendiz

9 October 2021 9	Oviedo	1 – 1	Sporting Gijón	Oviedo
21:00 CEST (UTC+2)	Lucas Ahijado (yellow card) 13' (goal) 29'; Brugman (yellow card) 15'; Jimmy Suárez (yellow card) 53'; David Costas (yellow card) 68'; Viti (yellow card) 72'	Report	Babin (yellow card) 15'; Đurđević 83'; Aitor García (yellow card) 90+4'	Stadium: Carlos Tartiere; Attendance: 21,053; Referee: (Spain) Rubén Ávalos Barrera

17 October 2021 10	Real Sociedad B	1 – 1	Oviedo	San Sebastián
18:15 CEST (UTC+2)	Iker Kortajarena (yellow card) 2'; Olasagasti 57'; Aritz Arambarri (yellow card) 77'	Report	Borja Bastón 65'; Jimmy Suárez (yellow card) 90'	Stadium: Reale Arena; Attendance: 3,028; Referee: (Spain) Raúl González Francés

21 October 2021 11	Oviedo	1 – 3	Burgos	Oviedo
21:00 CEST (UTC+2)	Borja Bastón 57' (pen.)	Report	Guillermo Fernández 30' 57'; Miguel Ángel (yellow card) 51'; José Matos (yellow card) 56'; Claudio Medina 85'	Stadium: Carlos Tartiere; Attendance: 7,411; Referee: (Spain) Víctor García Verdura

24 October 2021 12	Ponferradina	1 – 2	Oviedo	Ponferrada
18:15 CEST (UTC+2)	Edu Espiau (yellow card) 44'; José María Amo (yellow card) 49'; David Costas 56' (o.g.)	Report	Obeng 13'; Borja Bastón 81'	Stadium: Estadio El Toralín; Attendance: 5,600; Referee: (Spain) Eduardo Prieto Iglesias

31 October 2021 13	Oviedo	2 – 1	Málaga	Oviedo
16:00 CEST (UTC+2)	David Costas (yellow card) 15'; Borja Bastón 20' 90'; Mossa (yellow card) 73'	Report	Genaro Rodríguez 74'	Stadium: Carlos Tartiere; Attendance: 8,369; Referee: (Spain) Saúl Ais Reig

3 November 2021 14	Eibar	1 – 0	Oviedo	Eibar
21:15 CET (UTC+1)	Etxeita 90+4'	Report	Cornud (yellow card) 14'	Stadium: Ipurua; Attendance: 3,551; Referee: (Spain) Juan Pulido Santana

6 November 2021 15	Oviedo	1 – 1	Las Palmas	Oviedo
18:15 CET (UTC+1)	Borja Bastón 21' (pen.); Obeng (yellow card) 30'; Viti (yellow card) 31'; Dani Calvo (yellow card) 43'; Jorge Pombo (yellow card) 90'	Report	Kirian Rodríguez 72'; Eric Curbelo (yellow card) 87'	Stadium: Carlos Tartiere; Attendance: 9,139; Referee: (Spain) Francisco Hernández Maeso

14 November 2021 16	Leganés	0 – 0	Oviedo	Leganés
18:15 CET (UTC+1)	Bruno (yellow card) 71'	Report	David Costas (yellow card) 30'; Brugman (yellow card) 57'; Lucas Ahijado (yellow card) 62'	Stadium: Estadio Municipal de Butarque; Attendance: 7,803; Referee: (Spain) Javier Iglesias Villanueva

20 November 2021 17	Oviedo	2 – 0	Amorebieta	Oviedo
16:00 CET (UTC+1)	Viti 25'; Borja Sánchez 32'	Report	Iker Unzueta (yellow card) 24'; Markel Lozano (yellow card) 57'; Lander Olaetxea (yellow card) 64'	Stadium: Carlos Tartiere; Attendance: 8,473; Referee: (Spain) Víctor García Verdura

26 November 2021 18	Mirandés	1 – 1	Oviedo	Miranda de Ebro
21:00 CET (UTC+1)	Sergio Camello 53'; Iñigo Vicente (yellow card) 60'	Report	Brugman (yellow card) 55'; Carlos Isaac (yellow card) 60'; Matheus Aiás 61'	Stadium: Estadio Municipal de Anduva; Attendance: 2,208; Referee: (Spain) Rafael Sánchez López

5 December 2021 19	Oviedo	3 – 1	Alcorcón	Oviedo
18:15 CET (UTC+1)	Dani Calvo (yellow card) 32'; Brugman 47'; Borja Bastón 65' 68'	Report	Gorosito (yellow card) 38'; Laure (yellow card) 81'; Raúl Asencio 90+1'	Stadium: Carlos Tartiere; Attendance: 7,102; Referee: (Spain) Gorka Sagués Oscoz

12 December 2021 20	Real Valladolid	2 – 1	Oviedo	Valladolid
16:00 CET (UTC+1)	Weissman 7' (yellow card) 60'; Kike Pérez (yellow card) 18'; Joaquín Fernández (yellow card) 21'; Nacho 45+1' (yellow card) 63'; El Yamiq (yellow card) 72'; Rubén Alcaraz (yellow card) 82'	Report	Borja Bastón 29'; Jirka (yellow card) 76'	Stadium: Estadio José Zorrilla; Attendance: 15,309; Referee: (Spain) José López Toca

19 December 2021 21	Fuenlabrada	0 – 0	Oviedo	Fuenlabrada
14:00 CET (UTC+1)	Damián (yellow card) 10'; Rubén Pulido (yellow card) 44'; Anderson (yellow card) 82'; Cristóbal (yellow card) 90+3'; Iban Salvador (yellow card) 90+4'	Report	Joni Montiel (yellow card) 79'; Jorge Pombo (yellow card) 89'; Cornud (yellow card) 90+4'	Stadium: Estadio Fernando Torres; Attendance: 2,127; Referee: (Spain) Aitor Gorostegui Fernández

31 December 2021 22	Oviedo	2 – 0	Ponferradina	Oviedo
14:00 CET (UTC+1)	Borja Sánchez 62'; Cornud (yellow card) 65'; Jorge Pombo 75' (pen.)	Report	Edu Espiau (red card) 16'; Kike Saverio (yellow card) 26'; Lucho García (yellow card) 54'; Sergi Enrich (yellow card) 54'; José Naranjo (red card) 57'; Cristian Rodríguez (yellow card) 65'; Copete (yellow card) 71' (red card) 74'	Stadium: Carlos Tartiere; Attendance: 7,125; Referee: (Spain) David Gálvez Rascón

=== Copa del Rey ===
1 December 2021 First Round	Andratx	2 - 1	Oviedo	Andratx
20:00	Pau Pomar 25'; Miquel Llabrés 31'; Guillermo Palmer (yellow card) 75'; Álvaro De Dios (yellow card) 90+1'	Report	Jirka 39'	Stadium: Estadi de Sa Plana; Referee: (Spain) Iván Caparrós Hernández
