= 2024 Segunda División play-offs =

Football competition

Segunda División play-offs
- Season: 2023–24
- Promoted: Espanyol
- Matches: 6
- Goals: 6 (1 per match)

The 2023–24 Segunda División play-offs were played from 8 June to 23 June 2024 and determined the third team promoted to La Liga for the following season. Teams placed between 3rd and 6th position took part in the promotion play-offs.

== Regulations ==
The regulations were the same as the previous season: in the semi-finals, the fifth-placed team faced the fourth-placed team, while the sixth-placed team faced the third. Each tie was played over two legs, with the team lower in the table hosting the first leg.

The team that scored more goals on aggregate over the two legs advanced to the next round. If the aggregate score was level, then thirty minutes of extra time would be played. If the aggregate level was still level after extra time, the winner would be the best positioned team in the regular season.

== Road to the play-offs ==
Pos	Team	Pld	W	D	L	GF	GA	GD	Pts	Qualification or relegation
3	Eibar	42	21	8	13	72	48	+24	71	Qualification for promotion play-offs
4	Espanyol (O, P)	42	17	18	7	59	40	+19	69	Qualification for promotion play-offs
5	Sporting Gijón	42	18	11	13	51	42	+9	65	Qualification for promotion play-offs
6	Oviedo	42	17	13	12	55	39	+16	64 (Note: Oviedo finished ahead of Racing Santander on overall goal difference)	Qualification for promotion play-offs

Updated to match(es) played on 2 Jun 2024. Source: LaLiga HyperMotion
Rules for classification: 1) Points; 2) Head-to-head points; 3) Head-to-head goal difference; 4) Goal difference; 5) Goals scored; 6) Fair-play points
(Note: Head-to-head record is used only after all the matches between the teams in question have been played)
(O) Play-off winners; (P) Promoted

== Bracket ==
Semi-finals
3	Eibar	0	0	0
6	Oviedo	0	2	2
4	Espanyol	1	0	1
5	Sporting Gijón	0	0	0

Final
6	Oviedo	1	0	1
4	Espanyol	0	2	2

=== Semi-finals ===
Team 1	Agg.	Team 2	1st leg	2nd leg
Eibar	0–2	Oviedo	0–0	0–2
Espanyol	1–0	Sporting Gijón	1–0	0-0

First leg

8 June 2024	Oviedo	0–0	Eibar	Oviedo
18:30 UTC+2		Report		Stadium: Carlos Tartiere; Attendance: 28,100; Referee: Alejandro Quintero González

9 June 2024	Sporting Gijón	0–1	Espanyol	Gijón
21:00 UTC+2		Report	Puado 88'; Gómez (red card) 90'	Stadium: El Molinón; Attendance: 25,075; Referee: Jon Ander González Esteban

Second leg

12 June 2024	Eibar	0–2 (0–2 agg.)	Oviedo	Eibar
21:00 UTC+2		Report	Alemão 59'; Moyano 79'	Stadium: Ipurúa; Attendance: 7,732; Referee: Iosu Galech Apezteguía

13 June 2024	Espanyol	0–0 (1–0 agg.)	Sporting Gijón	Cornellà–El Prat
21:00 UTC+2	El Hilali (red card) 90+1'	Report		Stadium: Stage Front; Attendance: 30,605; Referee: Álvaro Moreno Aragón

=== Finals ===
Team 1	Agg.	Team 2	1st leg	2nd leg
Espanyol	2–1	Oviedo	0–1	2–0

First leg

16 June 2024
18:30 UTC+2

Oviedo	1–0	Espanyol
Alemão 72'	Report

Carlos Tartiere, Oviedo
Attendance: 29,297
Referee: Dámaso Arcediano Monescillo

Oviedo	Espanyol

GK	31	(Spain) Leo Román
RB	7	(Spain) Viti
CB	15	(Spain) Oier Luengo
CB	12	(Spain) Dani Calvo (c)
LB	21	(Spain) Carlos Pomares		(substituted off) 60'
CM	5	(Spain) Luismi	(yellow card) 67'	(substituted off) 78'
CM	11	(Argentina) Santiago Colombatto
RW	18	(Spain) Paulino de la Fuente		(substituted off) 34'
AM	16	(Spain) Jaime Seoane
LW	17	(Spain) Sebas Moyano		(substituted off) 60'
CF	14	(Brazil) Alemão		(substituted off) 78'
Substitutions:
GK	1	(France) Quentin Braat
DF	23	(Spain) Abel Bretones		(substituted on) 60'
DF	24	(Spain) Lucas Ahijado
MF	6	(Spain) Jimmy Suárez
MF	8	(Spain) Santi Cazorla
MF	10	(Spain) Víctor Camarasa
MF	13	(Uruguay) Santiago Homenchenko		(substituted on) 78'
MF	22	(Belgium) Jonathan Dubasin		(substituted on) 34'
MF	25	(Spain) Borja Sánchez
FW	9	(Spain) Borja Bastón		(substituted on) 79'
FW	19	(Spain) Álex Millán
FW	20	(Portugal) Masca		(substituted on) 60'
Manager:
(Spain) Luis Carrión

GK	1	(Spain) Joan García
RB	2	(Spain) Óscar Gil	(yellow card) 70'	(substituted off) 76'
CB	5	(Spain) Fernando Calero
CB	6	(Uruguay) Leandro Cabrera
LB	14	(Spain) Brian Oliván		(substituted off) 76'
RM	18	(Spain) Álvaro Aguado		(substituted off) 62'
CM	15	(Spain) José Gragera
CM	8	(Albania) Keidi Bare
LM	17	(Spain) Jofre Carreras		(substituted off) 62'
CF	7	(Spain) Javi Puado (c)		(substituted off) 62'
CF	22	(Denmark) Martin Braithwaite
Substitutions:
GK	13	(Spain) Fernando Pacheco
DF	3	(Spain) Sergi Gómez		(substituted on) 62'
DF	4	(Spain) Víctor Ruiz
DF	24	(Spain) Rubén Sánchez
MF	16	(Spain) José Carlos Lazo
MF	19	(Spain) Salvi		(substituted on) 62'
MF	21	(Spain) Nico Melamed		(substituted on) 62'
MF	29	(Spain) Antoniu Roca
MF	44	(Spain) Rafel Bauzà
FW	9	(Senegal) Keita Baldé	(yellow card) 87'	(substituted on) 76'
FW	11	(Spain) Pere Milla		(substituted on) 76'
FW	39	(Uruguay) Gastón Valles
Manager:
(Spain) Manolo González

Second leg

23 June 2024
18:30 UTC+2

Espanyol	2–0	Oviedo
Puado 44', 45+2'	Report

Stage Front, Cornellà–El Prat
Attendance: 33,107
Referee: Adrián Cordero Vega

Espanyol	Oviedo

GK	1	(Spain) Joan García
RB	23	(Morocco) Omar El Hilali
CB	5	(Spain) Fernando Calero
CB	6	(Uruguay) Leandro Cabrera	(yellow card) 21'
LB	11	(Spain) Pere Milla	(yellow card) 64'	(substituted off) 68'
RM	17	(Spain) Jofre Carreras		(substituted off) 78'
CM	15	(Spain) José Gragera
CM	8	(Albania) Keidi Bare	(yellow card) 47'	(substituted off) 78'
LM	21	(Spain) Nico Melamed		(substituted off) 78'
CF	7	(Spain) Javi Puado (c)		(substituted off) 87'
CF	22	(Denmark) Martin Braithwaite
Substitutions:
GK	13	(Spain) Fernando Pacheco
DF	2	(Spain) Óscar Gil
DF	3	(Spain) Sergi Gómez
DF	4	(Spain) Víctor Ruiz		(substituted on) 78'
DF	14	(Spain) Brian Oliván		(substituted on) 68'
DF	24	(Spain) Rubén Sánchez
MF	10	(Spain) Pol Lozano		(substituted on) 87'
MF	18	(Spain) Álvaro Aguado		(substituted on) 78'
MF	19	(Spain) Salvi		(substituted on) 78'
MF	44	(Spain) Rafel Bauzà
FW	9	(Senegal) Keita Baldé
FW	39	(Uruguay) Gastón Valles
Manager:
(Spain) Manolo González

GK	31	(Spain) Leo Román
RB	7	(Spain) Viti	(yellow card) 40'
CB	15	(Spain) Oier Luengo
CB	12	(Spain) Dani Calvo (c)
LB	21	(Spain) Carlos Pomares		(substituted off) 46'
CM	5	(Spain) Luismi		(substituted off) 62'
CM	11	(Argentina) Santiago Colombatto
RW	22	(Belgium) Jonathan Dubasin		(substituted off) 62'
AM	16	(Spain) Jaime Seoane	(yellow card) 73'	(substituted off) 75'
LW	17	(Spain) Sebas Moyano	(yellow card) 28'	(substituted off) 46'
CF	14	(Brazil) Alemão
Substitutions:
GK	1	(France) Quentin Braat
DF	4	(Spain) David Costas
DF	23	(Spain) Abel Bretones		(substituted on) 46'
DF	24	(Spain) Lucas Ahijado
MF	6	(Spain) Jimmy Suárez
MF	8	(Spain) Santi Cazorla		(substituted on) 62'
MF	10	(Spain) Víctor Camarasa
MF	13	(Uruguay) Santiago Homenchenko
MF	25	(Spain) Borja Sánchez		(substituted on) 46'
FW	9	(Spain) Borja Bastón		(substituted on) 75'
FW	19	(Spain) Álex Millán
FW	20	(Portugal) Masca		(substituted on) 62'
Manager:
(Spain) Luis Carrión
