= List of Spanish football transfers winter 2024–25 =

This is a list of Spanish football transfers for the 2024–25 winter transfer window. Only transfers featuring La Liga and Segunda División are listed.

== La Liga ==
Note: Flags indicate national team as has been defined under FIFA eligibility rules. Players may hold more than one non-FIFA nationality.

=== Real Madrid ===
In:

No.	Pos.	Nation	Player

Out:

No.	Pos.	Nation	Player

=== Barcelona ===
In:

No.	Pos.	Nation	Player
25	GK	POL	Wojciech Szczęsny (free agent)

Out:

No.	Pos.	Nation	Player
—	DF	ESP	Álex Valle (on loan to (Italy) Como, previously on loan at (Scotland) Celtic)
—	FW	BRA	Vitor Roque (to (Brazil) Palmeiras, previously on loan at Real Betis)

=== Girona ===
In:

No.	Pos.	Nation	Player
12	MF	BRA	Arthur Melo (on loan from (Italy) Juventus)
25	GK	UKR	Vladyslav Krapyvtsov (free agent)

Out:

No.	Pos.	Nation	Player
25	GK	ESP	Pau López (loan return to (France) Marseille)

=== Atlético Madrid ===
In:

No.	Pos.	Nation	Player

Out:

No.	Pos.	Nation	Player
—	FW	POR	Marcos Paulo (to (Brazil) Boavista, previously on loan at (Belgium) RWD Molenbeek)

=== Athletic Bilbao ===
In:

No.	Pos.	Nation	Player
21	FW	ESP	Maroan Sannadi (from Alavés, previously on loan at Barakaldo)

Out:

No.	Pos.	Nation	Player
19	FW	ESP	Javier Martón (on loan to Albacete)
21	MF	ESP	Ander Herrera (to (Argentina) Boca Juniors)
22	FW	ESP	Nico Serrano (on loan to Sporting Gijón)
26	GK	ESP	Álex Padilla (on loan to (Mexico) UNAM)

=== Real Sociedad ===
In:

No.	Pos.	Nation	Player

Out:

No.	Pos.	Nation	Player
15	MF	ESP	Urko González de Zárate (on loan to Espanyol)
19	FW	NGA	Umar Sadiq (on loan to Valencia)
25	FW	ESP	Jon Magunazelaia (on loan to Córdoba)

=== Real Betis ===
In:

No.	Pos.	Nation	Player
7	FW	BRA	Antony (on loan from (England) Manchester United)
19	FW	COL	Cucho Hernández (from (United States) Columbus Crew)

Out:

No.	Pos.	Nation	Player
1	GK	POR	Rui Silva (on loan to (Portugal) Sporting CP)
7	FW	ESP	Juanmi (on loan to Getafe)
8	FW	BRA	Vitor Roque (loan return to Barcelona)
19	FW	ESP	Iker Losada (on loan to Celta Vigo)
38	FW	ESP	Assane Diao (to (Italy) Como)

=== Villarreal ===
In:

No.	Pos.	Nation	Player
9	FW	CAN	Tajon Buchanan (on loan from (Italy) Inter Milan)
12	DF	ESP	Juan Bernat (from (France) Paris Saint-Germain, previously on loan)

Out:

No.	Pos.	Nation	Player
12	DF	ESP	Juan Bernat (to Getafe)
20	MF	ESP	Ramon Terrats (on loan to Getafe)
33	FW	ESP	Pau Cabanes (on loan to Alavés)

=== Valencia ===
In:

No.	Pos.	Nation	Player
12	FW	NGA	Umar Sadiq (on loan from Real Sociedad)
17	MF	ESP	Iván Jaime (on loan from (Portugal) Porto)
19	DF	ENG	Max Aarons (on loan from (England) Bournemouth)

Out:

No.	Pos.	Nation	Player
17	FW	ESP	Dani Gómez (loan return to Levante)
30	MF	ESP	Germán Valera (on loan to Elche)
—	FW	ESP	Hugo González (on loan to Celta Fortuna, previously on loan at Cartagena)

=== Alavés ===
In:

No.	Pos.	Nation	Player
2	DF	ARG	Facundo Garcés (from (Argentina) Colón)
19	FW	ESP	Pau Cabanes (on loan from Villarreal)
21	MF	ESP	Carles Aleñá (on loan from Getafe)

Out:

No.	Pos.	Nation	Player
19	MF	ESP	Stoichkov (to Granada)
20	MF	ARG	Luka Romero (loan return to (Italy) Milan)
21	FW	ALG	Abde Rebbach (on loan to Granada)
—	FW	ESP	Maroan Sannadi (to Athletic Bilbao, previously on loan at Barakaldo)

=== Osasuna ===
In:

No.	Pos.	Nation	Player

Out:

No.	Pos.	Nation	Player
2	DF	ESP	Nacho Vidal (to Oviedo)
21	MF	ESP	Javi Martínez (to Eibar)
27	FW	ESP	Iker Benito (on loan to Mirandés)

=== Getafe ===
In:

No.	Pos.	Nation	Player
11	MF	ESP	Ramon Terrats (on loan from Villarreal)
12	DF	CMR	Allan Nyom (free agent)
14	DF	ESP	Juan Bernat (from Villarreal)
24	FW	ESP	Juanmi (on loan from Real Betis)

Out:

No.	Pos.	Nation	Player
3	DF	ARG	Fabrizio Angileri (to (Brazil) Corinthians)
11	MF	ESP	Carles Aleñá (on loan to Alavés)
27	DF	MAR	Nabil Aberdin (to (Russia) Sochi)

=== Celta Vigo ===
In:

No.	Pos.	Nation	Player
14	FW	ESP	Iker Losada (on loan from Real Betis)

Out:

No.	Pos.	Nation	Player
9	FW	GRE	Anastasios Douvikas (to (Italy) Como)
14	MF	USA	Luca de la Torre (on loan to (United States) San Diego)
15	DF	GHA	Joseph Aidoo (on loan to Valladolid)
17	FW	CIV	Jonathan Bamba (to (United States) Chicago Fire)
23	FW	ARG	Tadeo Allende (on loan to (United States) Inter Miami)
—	MF	ESP	Carlos Dotor (on loan to Sporting Gijón, previously on loan at Oviedo)

=== Sevilla ===
In:

No.	Pos.	Nation	Player
5	FW	SUI	Rubén Vargas (from (Germany) FC Augsburg)
15	FW	NGA	Akor Adams (from (France) Montpellier)

Out:

No.	Pos.	Nation	Player
8	MF	ESP	Pedro Ortiz (to Córdoba)
9	FW	NGA	Kelechi Iheanacho (on loan to (England) Middlesbrough)
15	DF	ARG	Gonzalo Montiel (to (Argentina) River Plate)
16	DF	ESP	Jesús Navas (retired)
19	DF	ARG	Valentín Barco (loan return to (England) Brighton & Hove Albion)

=== Mallorca ===
In:

No.	Pos.	Nation	Player

Out:

No.	Pos.	Nation	Player
4	DF	BEL	Siebe Van der Heyden (on loan to (Germany) FC St. Pauli)
19	FW	ESP	Javier Llabrés (on loan to Eldense)
33	MF	COL	Daniel Luna (on loan to Cartagena)

=== Las Palmas ===
In:

No.	Pos.	Nation	Player
6	DF	FRA	Andy Pelmard (on loan from (France) Clermont, previously on loan at (Italy) Lecce)
21	MF	ESP	Stefan Bajcetic (on loan from (England) Liverpool, previously on loan at (Austria) Red Bull Salzburg)

Out:

No.	Pos.	Nation	Player
6	MF	ESP	Fabio González (to Tenerife)
7	FW	ESP	Pejiño (on loan to Elche)
21	MF	ESP	Iván Gil (on loan to Eibar)
22	DF	NED	Daley Sinkgraven (to (Netherlands) Fortuna Sittard)
25	GK	ESP	Álvaro Valles (free agent)

=== Rayo Vallecano ===
In:

No.	Pos.	Nation	Player

Out:

No.	Pos.	Nation	Player
10	MF	COL	James Rodríguez (to (Mexico) León)

=== Leganés ===
In:

No.	Pos.	Nation	Player
4	DF	CRO	Borna Barišić (on loan from (Turkey) Trabzonspor)
18	FW	CPV	Duk (from (Scotland) Aberdeen)

Out:

No.	Pos.	Nation	Player
4	DF	ECU	Jackson Porozo (loan return to (France) Troyes)
18	FW	CIV	Sébastien Haller (loan return to (Germany) Borussia Dortmund)
27	FW	ESP	Naim García (on loan to Racing Ferrol)

=== Valladolid ===
In:

No.	Pos.	Nation	Player
4	MF	HUN	Tamás Nikitscher (from (Hungary) Kecskemét)
8	MF	AUT	Florian Grillitsch (on loan from (Germany) TSG Hoffenheim)
16	DF	GHA	Joseph Aidoo (on loan from Celta Vigo)
17	DF	BRA	Henrique Silva (free agent)
22	DF	ITA	Antonio Candela (on loan from (Italy) Venezia)
35	DF	SLE	Juma Bah (from (Sierra Leone) AIK Freetong, previously on loan)
39	DF	MAR	Adam Aznou (on loan from (Germany) Bayern Munich)

Out:

No.	Pos.	Nation	Player
4	MF	ESP	Víctor Meseguer (on loan to Racing Santander)
8	MF	ESP	Kike Pérez (to (Italy) Venezia)
16	MF	ESP	César de la Hoz (to Oviedo)
22	DF	BRA	Lucas Rosa (to (Netherlands) Ajax)
35	DF	SLE	Juma Bah (to (England) Manchester City)
36	GK	ESP	Álvaro Aceves (on loan to Eldense)

=== Espanyol ===
In:

No.	Pos.	Nation	Player
2	FW	ESP	Roberto Fernández (on loan from (Portugal) Braga)
19	MF	ESP	Urko González de Zárate (on loan from Real Sociedad)
24	DF	ESP	Pablo Ramón (from Real Madrid Castilla)

Out:

No.	Pos.	Nation	Player
19	MF	ESP	Salvi Sánchez (free agent)
24	FW	FRA	Irvin Cardona (loan return to (Germany) FC Augsburg)
37	FW	TUR	Naci Ünüvar (loan return to (Netherlands) Ajax)

== Segunda División ==
Note: Flags indicate national team as has been defined under FIFA eligibility rules. Players may hold more than one non-FIFA nationality.

=== Cádiz ===
In:

No.	Pos.	Nation	Player
21	DF	ESP	Iker Recio (from Antequera)
37	DF	ESP	Mario Climent (from Mérida)

Out:

No.	Pos.	Nation	Player
11	FW	ESP	Iván Alejo (on loan to (Cyprus) APOEL)
12	MF	MLI	Rominigue Kouamé (on loan to (United States) Chicago Fire)
21	MF	CHI	Tomás Alarcón (to (Chile) Colo-Colo)
24	DF	ESP	Antonio Glauder (free agent)
—	MF	ESP	José Mari (retired)

=== Almería ===
In:

No.	Pos.	Nation	Player
23	MF	ESP	Selvi Clua (from Girona B)

Out:

No.	Pos.	Nation	Player
34	MF	ESP	Rubén Quintanilla (on loan to Burgos)

=== Granada ===
In:

No.	Pos.	Nation	Player
10	MF	ESP	Stoichkov (from Alavés)
17	FW	ESP	Borja Bastón (free agent)
21	FW	ALG	Abde Rebbach (on loan from Alavés)

Out:

No.	Pos.	Nation	Player
10	FW	ALB	Myrto Uzuni (to (United States) Austin)
14	DF	ESP	Ignasi Miquel (to Levante)
17	FW	CAN	Theo Corbeanu (on loan to (Canada) Toronto)
22	FW	ESP	Pablo Sáenz (on loan to Albacete)

=== Eibar ===
In:

No.	Pos.	Nation	Player
1	GK	ESP	Álex Domínguez (on loan from (France) Toulouse)
12	MF	ESP	Iván Gil (on loan from Las Palmas)
15	DF	ESP	Arnau Comas (on loan from (Switzerland) Basel)
24	MF	ESP	Javi Martínez (from Osasuna)

Out:

No.	Pos.	Nation	Player
1	GK	BRA	Daniel Fuzato (to (Brazil) Vasco da Gama)
15	MF	JPN	Kento Hashimoto (to (Japan) Tokyo)
27	FW	BUL	Slavy (on loan to Villarreal B)
34	FW	ESP	Eric Pérez (on loan to Amorebieta)

=== Sporting Gijón ===
In:

No.	Pos.	Nation	Player
12	MF	ESP	Carlos Dotor (on loan from Celta Vigo, previously on loan at Oviedo)
21	FW	ESP	Nico Serrano (on loan from Athletic Bilbao)

Out:

No.	Pos.	Nation	Player
—	FW	ESP	Álex Lozano (on loan to San Fernando, previously on loan at Real Unión)

=== Oviedo ===
In:

No.	Pos.	Nation	Player
5	DF	ESP	Nacho Vidal (from Osasuna)
10	MF	ESP	Francisco Portillo (free agent)
17	MF	ESP	César de la Hoz (from Valladolid)

Out:

No.	Pos.	Nation	Player
5	MF	ESP	Alberto del Moral (on loan to Córdoba)
17	FW	POR	Masca (to Eldense)
22	MF	ESP	Carlos Dotor (loan return to Celta Vigo)

=== Racing Santander ===
In:

No.	Pos.	Nation	Player
16	FW	ESP	Rober (on loan from (Netherlands) NEC)
23	MF	ESP	Víctor Meseguer (on loan from Valladolid)

Out:

No.	Pos.	Nation	Player

=== Levante ===
In:

No.	Pos.	Nation	Player
18	DF	ESP	Ignasi Miquel (from Granada)
19	FW	ESP	Álex Forés (on loan from Villarreal B)
22	DF	ESP	Manu Sánchez (from (Poland) Górnik Zabrze)

Out:

No.	Pos.	Nation	Player
2	DF	ESP	Andrés García (to (England) Aston Villa)
12	FW	BRA	Fabrício (to (Brazil) Vitória)
17	MF	ESP	Óscar Clemente (on loan to Cartagena)
—	FW	ESP	Dani Gómez (to Zaragoza, previously on loan at Valencia)

=== Burgos ===
In:

No.	Pos.	Nation	Player
1	GK	ESP	Tomeu Nadal (from Tenerife)
2	DF	CIV	Ghislain Konan (free agent)
8	DF	ESP	Grego Sierra (from (Romania) Universitatea Craiova)
15	MF	SUI	Gabriel Barès (from (France) Montpellier)
17	FW	URU	Fernando Mimbacas (from (Uruguay) Juventud)
22	FW	ESP	Elady Zorrilla (from Intercity)
24	DF	SRB	Nikola Miličić (from (Serbia) Partizan, previously on loan at (Serbia) Napredak Kruševac)
46	MF	ESP	Rubén Quintanilla (on loan from Almería)

Out:

No.	Pos.	Nation	Player
1	GK	FRA	Loïc Badiashile (free agent)
2	DF	ARG	Lisandro López (to (Paraguay) Olimpia)
17	FW	ESP	Javi López (to Ibiza)
22	FW	CHI	Thomas Rodríguez (to (Uruguay) Juventud)
27	DF	ESP	David López (loan return to Mallorca)
38	DF	ESP	Ian Forns (loan return to Espanyol)

=== Racing Ferrol ===
In:

No.	Pos.	Nation	Player
2	FW	ESP	Naim García (on loan from Leganés)
8	FW	ESP	Héber Pena (from (Portugal) Vizela)
12	DF	ARG	Emanuel Insúa (from (Argentina) Banfield)
21	MF	ESP	Raúl Blanco (on loan from (Portugal) Casa Pia)

Out:

No.	Pos.	Nation	Player
2	DF	ESP	Julián Delmás (to Cartagena)
8	MF	ESP	Álex López (retired)
12	FW	CPV	Bebé (to Ibiza)
21	DF	ESP	Moi Delgado (to Huesca)

=== Elche ===
In:

No.	Pos.	Nation	Player
3	DF	ESP	Jairo Izquierdo (from Cartagena)
8	MF	ESP	Marc Aguado (from Zaragoza)
20	MF	ESP	Germán Valera (on loan from Valencia)
23	FW	ESP	Pejiño (on loan from Las Palmas)

Out:

No.	Pos.	Nation	Player
8	MF	ESP	Raúl Guti (to Zaragoza)
20	MF	ESP	Cristian Salvador (to (China) Tianjin Jinmen Tiger)
23	DF	ESP	Carlos Clerc (free agent)
26	DF	CRO	Matía Barzic (on loan to Eldense)
36	FW	DOM	Rafa Núñez (on loan to Cartagena)

=== Tenerife ===
In:

No.	Pos.	Nation	Player
6	MF	ESP	Fabio González (from Las Palmas)
12	DF	ECU	Anthony Landázuri (from (Ecuador) Independiente del Valle)
25	GK	ESP	Edgar Badia (free agent)
33	MF	ESP	Aarón Martín (on loan from (Saudi Arabia) Al-Qadsiah)

Out:

No.	Pos.	Nation	Player
7	MF	ESP	Álvaro Romero (to Zamora)
12	DF	ESP	Rubén Alves (on loan to Córdoba)
13	GK	ESP	Tomeu Nadal (to Burgos)
24	DF	ESP	Josep Gayá (to (Moldova) Zimbru Chișinău)
33	MF	ESP	Aarón Martín (to (Saudi Arabia) Al-Qadsiah)
34	FW	ESP	Yanis Senhadji (loan return to Betis Deportivo)

=== Albacete ===
In:

No.	Pos.	Nation	Player
5	DF	ESP	Javi Moreno (from Arenteiro)
19	FW	ESP	Javier Martón (on loan from Athletic Bilbao)
21	FW	ESP	Pablo Sáenz (on loan from Granada)
23	DF	ESP	Pepe Sánchez (free agent)

Out:

No.	Pos.	Nation	Player
5	DF	ESP	Juan Antonio Ros (to (China) Tianjin Jinmen Tiger)
16	DF	ESP	Diego González (free agent)
21	FW	ESP	Alberto Quiles (to (China) Tianjin Jinmen Tiger)

=== Cartagena ===
In:

No.	Pos.	Nation	Player
5	MF	ESP	Assane Ndiaye (from Andorra)
11	MF	ESP	Óscar Clemente (on loan from Levante)
14	FW	ESP	Álex Millán (from (Portugal) Farense)
16	MF	EQG	Pepín Machín (on loan from (Italy) Monza, previously on loan at (Italy) Frosinone)
20	DF	ESP	Nacho Martínez (free agent)
21	DF	ESP	Julián Delmás (from Racing Ferrol)
32	MF	COL	Daniel Luna (on loan from Mallorca)
33	FW	MAR	Salim El Jebari (on loan from Atlético Madrid B)
38	FW	DOM	Rafa Núñez (on loan from Elche)

Out:

No.	Pos.	Nation	Player
3	DF	ESP	José Ríos Reina (free agent)
5	DF	ESP	Gonzalo Verdú (free agent)
18	MF	ARG	Damián Musto (to (Argentina) Alumni de Villa María)
20	DF	ESP	Jairo Izquierdo (to Elche)
23	FW	ESP	Cedric Teguia (to (Portugal) Moreirense)
34	FW	ESP	Hugo González (loan return to Valencia)
37	FW	ITA	Pocho Román (loan return to Barcelona B)

=== Zaragoza ===
In:

No.	Pos.	Nation	Player
9	FW	ESP	Dani Gómez (from Levante, previously on loan at Valencia)
10	MF	ESP	Raúl Guti (from Elche)
16	MF	HON	Kervin Arriaga (on loan from (Serbia) Partizan)

Out:

No.	Pos.	Nation	Player
1	GK	ARG	Cristian Álvarez (retired)
8	MF	ESP	Marc Aguado (to Elche)
9	FW	ESP	Iván Azón (to (Italy) Como)
10	MF	ESP	Sergio Bermejo (to (Portugal) Gil Vicente)
26	MF	ESP	Gori Gracia (on loan to Ibiza)
38	DF	ESP	Andrés Borge (on loan to Arenteiro)

=== Eldense ===
In:

No.	Pos.	Nation	Player
2	DF	ESP	Raúl Parra (on loan from (Portugal) Estoril, previously on loan at (Iraq) Al-Minaa)
10	FW	ESP	Javier Llabrés (on loan from Mallorca)
12	MF	MLI	Amadou Diawara (free agent)
16	FW	POR	Masca (from Oviedo)
19	MF	ESP	Fede Vico (free agent)
22	FW	SEN	Sekou Gassama (from (Algeria) USM Alger)
25	FW	ESP	Diego Collado (on loan from (Portugal) Gil Vicente)
26	DF	CRO	Matía Barzic (on loan from Elche)
28	MF	ESP	Diego Méndez (on loan from Rayo Vallecano B)
36	GK	ESP	Álvaro Aceves (on loan from Valladolid)

Out:

No.	Pos.	Nation	Player
10	MF	ESP	Cris Montes (to (Chile) Unión Española)
12	MF	POR	Francisco Geraldes (loan return to (Malaysia) Johor Darul Ta'zim)
16	MF	MAR	Youness Lachhab (to Ceuta)
19	FW	ESP	Joel Jorquera (to (Portugal) Moreirense)
22	DF	ROU	Ricardo Grigore (free agent)
27	FW	NGA	Sixtus Ogbuehi (on loan to Osasuna B)
29	FW	ESP	Alan Godoy (to Barcelona B)

=== Huesca ===
In:

No.	Pos.	Nation	Player
16	DF	ESP	Moi Delgado (from Racing Ferrol)

Out:

No.	Pos.	Nation	Player
26	DF	ESP	Hugo Anglada (to Girona B)

=== Mirandés ===
In:

No.	Pos.	Nation	Player
7	FW	ESP	Adrián Butzke (on loan from (Portugal) Vitória Guimarães, previously on loan at (Portugal) Nacional)
8	MF	ESP	Carlo García (on loan from Villarreal B)
29	FW	ESP	Iker Benito (on loan from Osasuna)

Out:

No.	Pos.	Nation	Player
8	MF	URU	Santiago Homenchenko (loan return to (Uruguay) Peñarol)
26	MF	CIV	Aboubacar Bassinga (loan return to Las Palmas B)

=== Castellón ===
In:

No.	Pos.	Nation	Player
2	MF	URU	Giovanni Zarfino (free agent)
3	FW	MLI	Mamadou Traoré (from (Belgium) Union SG)
12	MF	SRB	Miloš Jojić (from (Latvia) Riga)
19	FW	AUS	Awer Mabil (free agent)
20	FW	USA	Nick Markanich (from (United States) Charleston Battery)
25	DF	PAR	Juan Escobar (free agent)

Out:

No.	Pos.	Nation	Player
12	FW	SVN	David Flakus Bosilj (on loan to Murcia)
19	MF	ESP	Dani Villahermosa (to Andorra)
20	MF	NED	Mats Seuntjens (to (Netherlands) Groningen)
30	GK	USA	Brian Schwake (to (United States) Nashville)

=== Deportivo La Coruña ===
In:

No.	Pos.	Nation	Player
2	MF	AUS	Denis Genreau (from (France) Toulouse)
3	FW	NED	Zakaria Eddahchouri (from (Netherlands) Telstar)
11	DF	SRB	Nemanja Tošić (on loan from (Switzerland) Zürich)

Out:

No.	Pos.	Nation	Player
7	FW	ESP	Lucas Pérez (free agent)
11	FW	ESP	Davo (on loan to Murcia)
13	GK	ESP	Eric Puerto (on loan to Marbella)

=== Málaga ===
In:

No.	Pos.	Nation	Player

Out:

No.	Pos.	Nation	Player
15	DF	MLI	Moussa Diarra (on loan to Marbella)
25	FW	ESP	Sergio Castel (to Marbella)

=== Córdoba ===
In:

No.	Pos.	Nation	Player
2	MF	ESP	Pedro Ortiz (from Sevilla)
12	MF	ESP	Alberto del Moral (on loan from Oviedo)
16	DF	ESP	Rubén Alves (on loan from Tenerife)
24	FW	ESP	Jon Magunazelaia (on loan from Real Sociedad)
25	DF	ITA	Gabriele Corbo (from (Canada) Montréal)

Out:

No.	Pos.	Nation	Player
4	DF	ESP	Adrián Lapeña (to (Bulgaria) CSKA Sofia)
9	FW	ESP	Kuki Zalazar (to Ceuta)
16	DF	ESP	José Martínez (to (China) Yunnan Yukun)
19	FW	ENG	Jude Soonsup-Bell (on loan to Atlético Sanluqueño)

== See also ==
- 2024–25 La Liga
- 2024–25 Segunda División
