= Mario Sesé =

Spanish footballer

Personal information
- Full name: Mario Sesé Vera
- Date of birth: 30 August 2002 (age 24)
- Place of birth: Quart de Poblet, Spain
- Height: 1.78 m (5 ft 10 in)
- Position: Winger

Team information
- Current team: Atlético Levante

Youth career
- 2007–2009: Quart de Poblet
- 2009–2014: Valencia
- 2014–2016: Levante
- 2016–2017: Patacona
- 2017–2018: Levante
- 2018–2019: Quart de Poblet
- 2019–2020: Don Bosco
- 2020–2021: Alzira

Senior career*
Years	Team	Apps	(Gls)
2021	Alzira B	5	(4)
2021–2022	Alzira	25	(4)
2022–2024	Oviedo B	56	(4)
2022–2024	Oviedo	9	(0)
2024–2025	Valladolid B	19	(0)
2025–	Atlético Levante	10	(2)
- * Club domestic league appearances and goals as of 9 November 2025

Mario Sesé Vera (born 30 August 2002) is a Spanish footballer who plays as a right winger for Tercera Federación club Atlético Levante.

== Club career ==
Born in Quart de Poblet, Valencian Community, Sesé represented UD Quart de Poblet, Valencia CF, Levante UD, Patacona CF, CD Don Bosco and UD Alzira as a youth. After making his senior debut with the latter's reserves in 2021, he was promoted to the main squad in Segunda División RFEF on 16 June of that year.

Sesé made his first team debut for Alzira on 19 September 2021, coming on as a second-half substitute and scoring the opener in a 1–1 away draw against CD Eldense. On 11 June of the following year, after featuring regularly, he left the club after failing to agree new terms.

On 6 July 2022, Sesé signed for Real Oviedo and was initially assigned to the reserves also in the fourth tier. He made his first team debut on 30 November, starting in a 1–0 Segunda División away win over CD Tenerife.

On 2 July 2024, Sesé moved to another reserve team, Real Valladolid Promesas also in division four.
