= Enzo Pérez (footballer, born 2008) =

Spanish footballer (born 2008)

Personal information
- Full name: Enzo Pérez Miranda
- Date of birth: 5 November 2008 (age 17)
- Place of birth: Oviedo, Spain
- Height: 1.81 m (5 ft 11 in)
- Position: Attacking midfielder

Team information
- Current team: Oviedo B
- Number: 28

Youth career
- Vallobín
- 2015–2025: Oviedo

Senior career*
Years	Team	Apps	(Gls)
2023–	Oviedo B	19	(0)
2026–	Oviedo	1	(0)
- * Club domestic league appearances and goals as of 15 August 2026

Enzo Pérez Miranda (born 5 November 2008) is a Spanish footballer who plays as an attacking midfielder for Real Oviedo Vetusta.

== Career ==
Born in Oviedo, Asturias, Pérez joined Real Oviedo's youth sides in 2015, from CD Vallobín. He made his senior debut with the reserves on 11 May 2025, starting in a 3–0 Tercera Federación home win over SD Lenense, as the side was already promoted.

Pérez subsequently became a regular member of the B-team, but suffered an injury in November 2025 which sidelined him for nearly four months. Upon returning, he regained his starting spot, and renewed his contract until 2029 on 21 July 2026, also making the pre-season with the first team.

Pérez made his professional debut with the Carbayones on 15 August 2026, coming on as a late substitute for Youness Lachhab in a 0–0 Segunda División home draw against Granada CF; aged 17 years, nine months and ten days, he became the sixth-youngest player to debut for the club in the category.

== Personal life ==
Pérez's father Óscar was also a footballer and a midfielder. He too began his career at Oviedo.
