= Lucas Laso =

Spanish footballer (born 2003)

Personal information
- Full name: Lucas Laso Gutiérrez
- Date of birth: 4 January 2003 (age 23)
- Place of birth: Sarón, Spain
- Height: 1.89 m (6 ft 2 in)
- Position: Centre-back

Youth career
- Bansander
- 2019–2021: Oviedo

Senior career*
Years	Team	Apps	(Gls)
2021–2024	Oviedo B	60	(4)
2024–2025	Numancia	21	(0)
2025–2026	Getafe B	25	(1)
2025–2026	Getafe	0	(0)

International career
2020	Spain U17	4	(0)
- * Club domestic league appearances and goals as of 7 May 2026

Lucas Laso Gutiérrez (born 4 January 2003) is a Spanish professional footballer who plays as a centre-back.

== Club career ==
Born in Sarón, Cantabria, Laso joined Real Oviedo's youth sides in 2019, from Club Bansander. He made his senior debut with the reserves on 12 September 2021, starting in a 1–0 Tercera División RFEF away loss to Caudal Deportivo, and was a regular starter during the season as the side achieved promotion to Segunda Federación.

On 16 June 2023, Laso renewed his contract with the Carbayones until 2025. On 16 August of the following year, after losing his starting spot with the B-team, he terminated his link, and moved to fellow fourth division side CD Numancia just hours later.

On 17 July 2025, Laso signed for Getafe CF and was initially assigned to the reserves also in the fourth tier. He made his first team debut on 28 October, starting in a 11–0 away routing of CF Inter de Valdemoro, for the campaign's Copa del Rey.

Laso made his professional debut on 18 December 2025, playing the full 90 minutes in a 3–1 away loss to Burgos CF, also for the national cup.

== International career ==
On 7 January 2020, Laso was called up to the Spain national under-17 team.
