= Roberto Aguirre (football manager) =

Spanish footballer

Personal information
- Full name: Roberto Aguirre García
- Date of birth: 24 February 1968 (age 58)
- Place of birth: Candamo, Spain

Team information
- Current team: Oviedo B (manager)

Managerial career
- Years: Team
- 1992–1996: Rayo Majadahonda (youth)
- 1996–1998: Rayo Majadahonda B
- 1999–2002: Mosconia
- 2002–2003: Langreo
- 2003–2004: Atlètic Ciutadella
- 2004–2007: Pájara Playas
- 2007–2008: Soledad
- 2008: Atlètic Ciutadella
- 2008–2009: Lorca Deportiva
- 2009: Pontevedra
- 2011–2015: Zamora
- 2015–2016: Mensajero
- 2016–2018: Lealtad
- 2018–2019: Unionistas
- 2020–2021: Toledo
- 2021–2022: Don Benito
- 2024–: Oviedo B

Roberto Aguirre García (born 24 February 1968) is a Spanish football manager, currently in charge of Real Oviedo Vetusta.

== Career ==
Born in Candamo, Asturias, Aguirre started managing at the age of 25, in the youth sides of a defunct club based in Madrid. He then moved to CF Rayo Majadahonda, managing the club's cadete, juvenil and reserve teams.

In 2002, after three years in charge of Tercera División side CD Mosconia, Aguirre was appointed manager of UP Langreo in Segunda División B, but suffered relegation at the end of the season. He then worked at fourth tier side Atlètic de Ciutadella before returning to the third division with UD Pájara Playas de Jandía in 2004; he narrowly avoided relegation in his three-season spell at the latter.

On 20 December 2007, Aguirre was named in charge of CD Soledad in the fourth level. He returned to Ciutadella the following July, before accepting an offer from Lorca Deportiva CF in the third tier on 14 November 2008; despite reaching the second round of the promotion play-offs, his side suffered administrative relegation and he subsequently left.

On 30 June 2009, Aguirre was appointed Pontevedra CF manager, but was sacked on 24 November. On 6 January 2011, after more than a year without coaching, he took over Zamora CF also in the third division.

On 28 April 2015, Aguirre was dismissed from Zamora, after more than four years in charge. He was named CD Mensajero manager on 26 June, being sacked the following 12 January.

Aguirre was appointed manager of CD Lealtad on 16 June 2016, suffering relegation from the third tier in the 2017–18 campaign. On 23 July 2018, he was named at the helm of fellow league team Unionistas de Salamanca CF, being dismissed on 27 October of the following year.

On 4 September 2020, Aguirre was appointed CD Toledo manager in the fourth level. He was relieved of his duties the following 2 February, and took over CD Don Benito on 14 December 2021, in the new Segunda División RFEF.

Aguirre was sacked by Don Benito on 18 October 2022, with only seven rounds into the new season. On 8 April 2024, after more than a year without a club, he was named manager of Real Oviedo Vetusta also in division four.
