= Lucho García =

Colombian footballer (born 1998)

Personal information
- Full name: Luis Alberto García Pacheco
- Date of birth: 20 March 1998 (age 28)
- Place of birth: Barranquilla, Colombia
- Height: 1.91 m (6 ft 3 in)
- Position: Goalkeeper

Team information
- Current team: Cartagena
- Number: 13

Youth career
- 2011–2012: Real Madrid
- 2012–2016: Rayo Vallecano

Senior career*
Years	Team	Apps	(Gls)
2015–2018	Rayo Vallecano B	40	(0)
2018–2020	Sevilla B	29	(0)
2020–2021	Deportivo La Coruña	10	(0)
2021–2022	Ponferradina	6	(0)
2022–2023	Rayo Majadahonda	34	(0)
2023–2025	Algeciras	55	(0)
2025–	Cartagena	27	(0)

International career
2015	Colombia U17	8	(0)
2017	Colombia U20	1	(0)
- * Club domestic league appearances and goals as of 10 June 2026

Luis Alberto "Lucho" García Pacheco (born 20 March 1998) is a Colombian professional footballer who plays as a goalkeeper for Spanish Primera Federación club Cartagena.

== Club career ==
Born in Barranquilla, García moved to Spain at early age and represented Real Madrid and Rayo Vallecano as a youth. He made his senior debut with the latter's reserves on 6 September 2015, coming on as a second-half substitute for field player Luis Poblete in a 1–3 Tercera División home loss against CA Pinto.

On 11 July 2018, García joined another reserve team, Sevilla Atlético in Segunda División B. He featured sparingly for the side during his spell, being often a backup to Javi Díaz and Alfonso Pastor.

On 8 September 2020, García signed a three-year contract with Deportivo de La Coruña also in the third division. Initially a backup to Carlos Abad, he became the first-choice in February 2021.

On 1 July 2021, García moved to Segunda División side SD Ponferradina. He made his professional debut on 4 September, starting in a 0–2 away loss against CD Tenerife.

On 28 July 2022, after being only a backup option to Amir Abedzadeh, García moved to Primera Federación side CF Rayo Majadahonda.
