= Villanueva del Duque =

- Municipality
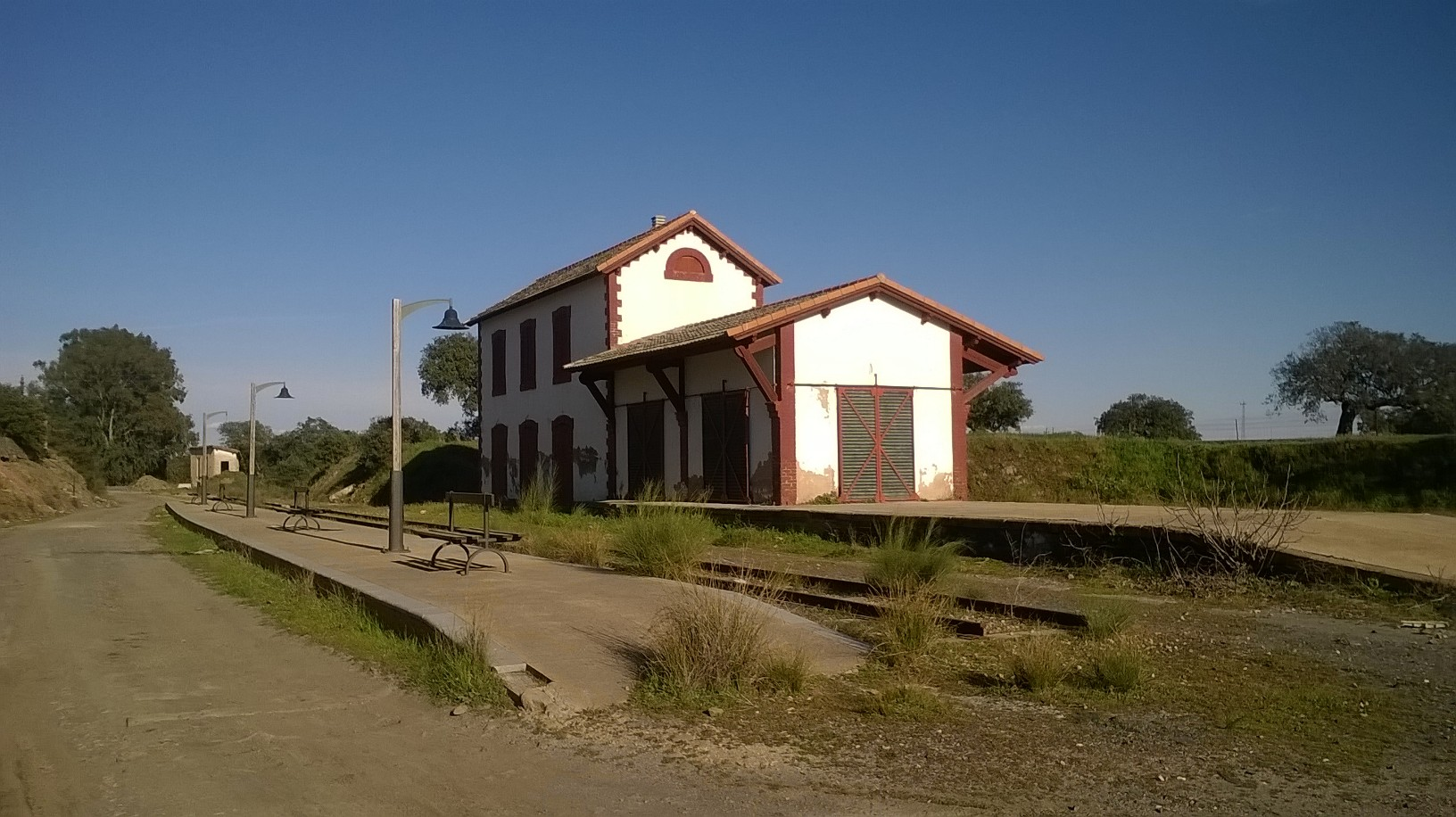
- El Soldado train station in the municipality of Villanueva del Duque

- Flag Coat of arms
- Interactive map of Villanueva del Duque
- Coordinates: 38.392665°N 4.999981°W
- Country: Spain
- Province: Córdoba
- Municipality: Villanueva del Duque

Area
  - Total: 137 km^{2} (53 sq mi)
- Elevation: 585 m (1,919 ft)

Population (2025-01-01)
  - Total: 1,409
  - Density: 10.3/km^{2} (26.6/sq mi)
- Time zone: UTC+1 (CET)
  - Summer (DST): UTC+2 (CEST)

Villanueva del Duque is a town located in the province of Córdoba, Spain. In the 2014 census, the town had a population of 1,580 inhabitants.

== See also ==
- List of municipalities in Córdoba
