= Joan Femenías =

Spanish footballer

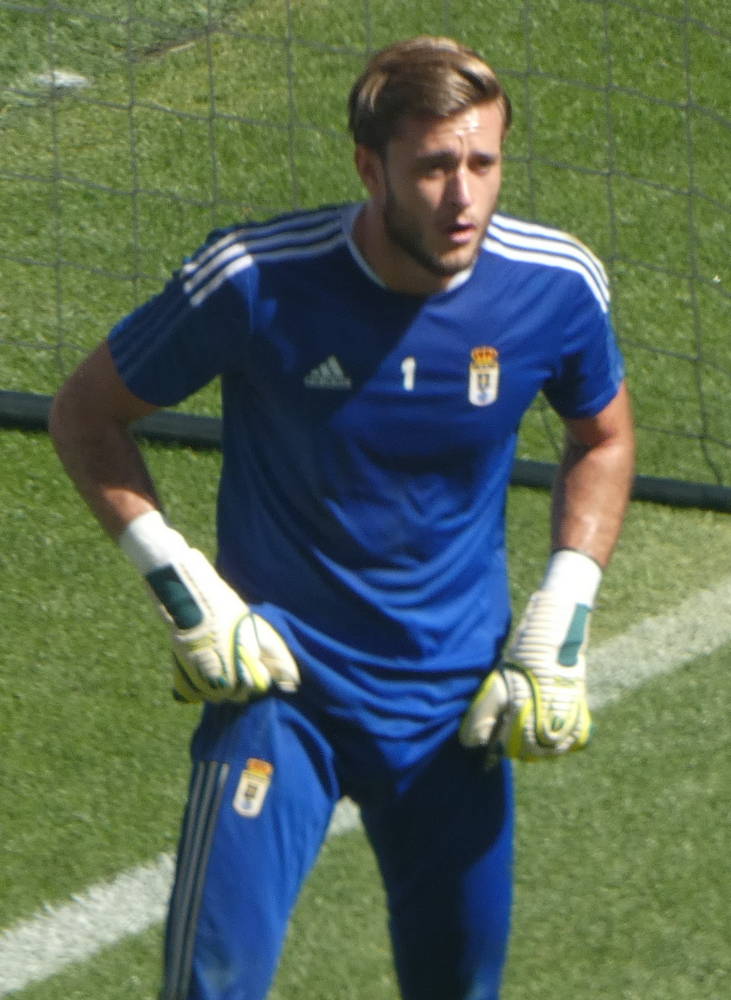
- Femenías in 2021

Personal information
- Full name: Joan Femenías del Salto
- Date of birth: 19 August 1996 (age 30)
- Place of birth: Manacor, Spain
- Height: 1.89 m (6 ft 2 in)
- Position: Goalkeeper

Youth career
- Constància
- 2013–2015: Villarreal

Senior career*
Years	Team	Apps	(Gls)
2015–2016	Villarreal C	16	(0)
2015–2019	Villarreal B	26	(0)
2019–2020	Fuenlabrada	6	(0)
2020–2022	Oviedo	82	(0)
2022–2024	Levante	17	(0)
2024–2025	Zaragoza	10	(0)
2025–2026	Penafiel	32	(0)
- * Club domestic league appearances and goals as of 30 August 2026

Joan Femenías del Salto (born 19 August 1996) is a Spanish footballer who plays as a goalkeeper.

== Club career ==
Born in Manacor, Mallorca, Balearic Islands, Femenías joined Villarreal CF's youth setup in 2013, from CE Constància. He made his senior debut with the reserves on 22 March 2015, coming on as a second-half substitute for Anton Shvets in a 3–1 Segunda División B away defeat of CD Eldense.

Ahead of the 2015–16 campaign, Femenías was assigned to the C-team in Tercera División. He was definitely promoted to the B's in July 2016, but only became a regular starter in the 2018–19 season after the departure of Ander Cantero.

On 17 July 2019, free agent Femenías signed a one-year deal with Segunda División newcomers CF Fuenlabrada. A third-choice behind Biel Ribas and Pol Freixanet, he made his professional debut on 28 June 2020, replacing the latter in the first half of a 1–1 home draw against Extremadura UD.

On 12 August 2020, Femenías signed a two-year deal with fellow second division side Real Oviedo. He was an undisputed starter for the side before moving to freshly relegated side Levante UD on 1 July 2022.

On 22 June 2024, Femenías reached an agreement with Real Zaragoza, with his two-year deal being effective as of 1 July. Roughly one year later, after losing his starting spot to Gaëtan Poussin, he terminated his link with the club.

On 30 July 2025, Femenías signed with Portuguese club Penafiel on a free, one-year transfer. On 4 September 2026, he left Penafiel by mutual consent.

== Career statistics ==
As of match played 20 May 2025

Appearances and goals by club, season and competition
Club	Season	League			Cup		Other		Total	
Club	Season	Division	Apps	Goals	Apps	Goals	Apps	Goals	Apps	Goals
Villarreal C	2015–16	Tercera División	16	0	—		—		16	0
Villarreal B	2014–15	Segunda División B	1	0	—		—		1	0
Villarreal B	2016–17	Segunda División B	1	0	—		—		1	0
Villarreal B	2017–18	Segunda División B	1	0	—		0	0	1	0
Villarreal B	2018–19	Segunda División B	22	0	—		1	0	23	0
Villarreal B	Total		25	0	—		1	0	26	0
Fuenlabrada	2019–20	Segunda División	6	0	0	0	—		6	0
Oviedo	2020–21	Segunda División	40	0	1	0	—		41	0
Oviedo	2021–22	Segunda División	42	0	0	0	—		42	0
Oviedo	Total		82	0	1	0	—		83	0
Levante	2022–23	Segunda División	8	0	4	0	4	0	16	0
Levante	2023–24	Segunda División	9	0	1	0	—		10	0
Levante	Total		17	0	5	0	4	0	26	0
Zaragoza	2024–25	Segunda División	10	0	2	0	—		12	0
Career total			156	0	8	0	5	0	168	10
