= Sebas Moyano =

Spanish footballer

Personal information
- Full name: Francisco Sebastián Moyano Jiménez
- Date of birth: 23 March 1997 (age 29)
- Place of birth: Villanueva del Duque, Spain
- Height: 1.68 m (5 ft 6 in)
- Position: Attacking midfielder

Youth career
- 2006–2009: EF Pozoblanco
- 2009–2011: Pozoblanco
- 2011–2012: Villanueva del Duque
- 2012–2013: Córdoba

Senior career*
Years	Team	Apps	(Gls)
2011–2012	Villanueva del Duque		
2013–2018	Córdoba B	156	(25)
2017–2020	Córdoba	15	(1)
2019	→ Valencia B (loan)	15	(1)
2020	→ Valencia B (loan)	6	(0)
2020–2023	Lugo	60	(8)
2020–2021	→ Ebro (loan)	23	(3)
2023–2025	Oviedo	77	(8)
2025–2026	Zaragoza	24	(2)

International career
2013	Spain U17	2	(0)
2015	Spain U18	2	(1)
- * Club domestic league appearances and goals as of 31 May 2026

Francisco Sebastián "Sebas" Moyano Jiménez (born 23 March 1997) is a Spanish footballer who plays as an attacking midfielder.

== Club career ==
Born in Villanueva del Duque, Córdoba, Andalusia, Moyano joined Córdoba CF in 2012, after already making his senior debut with CD Villanueva del Duque. He made his debut for the former's reserves on 1 September 2013, starting in a 0–0 Segunda División B away draw against UD Almería B.

Moyano scored a career-best 19 goals during the 2015–16 season, but suffered a knee injury which took him out of the ensuing promotion play-offs. On 18 March 2017 he made his professional debut, coming on as a second-half substitute for Antoñito in a 0–0 home draw against CD Numancia in the Segunda División.

On 9 July 2018, Moyano signed a new three-year deal with the Blanquiverdes. He scored his first professional goal on 16 October, netting his team's last through an individual effort in a 4–1 away routing of Elche CF, in the season's Copa del Rey.

On 31 January 2019, after being sparingly used, Moyano was loaned to third division side Valencia CF Mestalla, for six months. Upon returning, he was assigned to the main squad now also in division three, but returned to Valencia B on loan exactly one year later.

On 7 September 2020, free agent Moyano agreed to a three-year contract with CD Lugo in the second division. On 11 November, however, he was loaned to third-tier side CD Ebro as he was not registered on time by his parent club.

Back to Lugo in July 2021, Moyano became a regular starter for the side in the 2022–23 season, scoring five goals and featuring in all but one league match as they suffered relegation. On 14 June 2023, he signed a two-year deal with fellow division two side Real Oviedo.

On 17 February 2024, Moyano scored his first hat trick, netting three against Burgos CF. On 6 July 2025, after helping the Carbayones to achieve promotion to La Liga, he joined Real Zaragoza on a two-year contract.
