= Abel Bretones =

Spanish footballer

Personal information
- Full name: Abel Bretones Cruz
- Date of birth: 21 August 2000 (age 26)
- Place of birth: Langreo, Spain
- Height: 1.88 m (6 ft 2 in)
- Positions: Left-back; winger

Team information
- Current team: Osasuna
- Number: 23

Youth career
- Langreo
- Alcázar
- Langreo

Senior career*
Years	Team	Apps	(Gls)
2018–2020	Langreo B	54	(27)
2019–2022	Langreo	24	(2)
2022	Oviedo B	10	(3)
2022–2024	Oviedo	78	(1)
2024–	Osasuna	63	(3)
- * Club domestic league appearances and goals as of 27 May 2026

Abel Bretones Cruz (born 21 August 2000) is a Spanish professional footballer who plays as either a left-back or a winger for CA Osasuna.

== Career ==
=== Langreo ===
Born in La Felguera, Langreo, Asturias, Bretones represented UP Langreo and Alcázar CF as a youth. After making his senior debut with the farm team CD Langreo Eulalia, he made his first team debut on 9 March 2019, coming on as a late substitute for Héctor Nespral in a 1–0 Segunda División B away loss against SCD Durango.

Bretones featured regularly for Eulalia in the following years, scoring 19 goals in the 2019–20 season as the side achieved promotion to Regional Preferente and later was fully incorporated into Langreo's structure and subsequently renamed UP Langreo B. On 12 August 2021, he renewed his contract until 2023, being promoted to the main squad.

=== Oviedo ===
On 31 January 2022, Bretones moved to Real Oviedo and was assigned to the B-team in Tercera División RFEF. He impressed new manager Bolo during the pre-season, and made his professional debut on 21 August, his 22rd birthday, by starting in a 1–0 home win over CD Leganés in the Segunda División.

On 21 October 2022, Bretones renewed his contract with Oviedo until 2026. The following January, he was definitely promoted to Oviedo's first team, being assigned the number 2 jersey.

Bretones scored his first professional goal on 1 October 2023, netting the opener in a 3–1 away win over CD Eldense.

=== Osasuna ===
On 5 July 2024, Bretones signed a five-year contract with La Liga side CA Osasuna for a fee of € 2.8 million. He made his top tier debut on 17 August, starting in a 1–1 home draw against Leganés.
