= Álex Cardero =

Spanish footballer (born 2003)

Personal information
- Full name: Alejandro Suárez Cardero
- Date of birth: 25 August 2003 (age 23)
- Place of birth: Oviedo, Spain
- Height: 1.74 m (5 ft 9 in)
- Position: Midfielder

Team information
- Current team: Cultural Leonesa (on loan from Oviedo)

Youth career
- Juventud Estadio
- Oviedo

Senior career*
Years	Team	Apps	(Gls)
2020–2023	Oviedo B	81	(14)
2021–	Oviedo	26	(2)
2024	→ Arenteiro (loan)	20	(1)
2025–2026	→ Mirandés (loan)	17	(1)
2026	→ AEK Larnaca (loan)	13	(1)
2026–	→ Cultural Leonesa (loan)	0	(0)
- * Club domestic league appearances and goals as of 14:58, 28 May 2026 (UTC)

Alejandro "Álex" Suárez Cardero (born 25 August 2003) is a Spanish footballer who plays as a central midfielder for Cultural y Deportiva Leonesa, on loan from Real Oviedo.

== Club career ==
Born in Oviedo, Asturias, Cardero joined Real Oviedo's youth setup from Juventud Estadio CF. He made his senior debut with the reserves on 18 October 2020, starting in a 0–1 Segunda División B home loss against UP Langreo.

Cardero made his first-team debut on 29 May 2021, coming on as a late substitute for Alejandro Arribas in a 2–2 home draw against CD Tenerife in the Segunda División.

On 21 March 2023, Cardero renewed his contract with Oviedo until 2026. He scored his first professional goal on 21 December, netting the equalizer in a 1–1 away draw against Villarreal CF B.

On 3 January 2024, Cardero was loaned to Primera Federación side CD Arenteiro for the remainder of the season. Upon returning, he started to feature regularly with the first team of the Carbayones during the 2024–25 campaign, which ended in promotion to La Liga.

On 13 August 2025, Cardero further extended his link until 2028, but was loaned to CD Mirandés in the second division seven days later. The following 31 January, his loan was cut short, and he moved to Cypriot club AEK Larnaca FC also in a temporary deal.

On 10 August 2026, Cardero moved to Cultural y Deportiva Leonesa in division three on a one-year loan deal.
