= Javi Moreno (footballer, born 2000) =

Spanish footballer

Personal information
- Full name: Javier Moreno Arrones Gil
- Date of birth: 16 May 2000 (age 26)
- Place of birth: Oviedo, Spain
- Height: 1.85 m (6 ft 1 in)
- Position: Defender

Team information
- Current team: Albacete
- Number: 5

Youth career
- Oviedo

Senior career*
Years	Team	Apps	(Gls)
2019–2021	Llanes	43	(3)
2021–2023	Oviedo B	49	(0)
2021–2023	Oviedo	1	(0)
2023–2025	Arenteiro	51	(1)
2025–	Albacete	28	(0)
- * Club domestic league appearances and goals as of 9 June 2026

Javier "Javi" Moreno Arrones Gil (born 16 May 2000) is a Spanish footballer who plays for Albacete Balompié as either a central defender or a right back.

== Club career ==
Born in Oviedo, Asturias, Moreno was a Real Oviedo youth graduate. In August 2019, after finishing his formation, he was released by his club and subsequently joined Tercera División side CD Llanes.

Moreno made his senior debut on 15 September 2019, starting in a 0–0 away draw against Condal CF. He scored his first goal on 11 December, netting the opener in a 2–0 win at Club Siero.

On 5 July 2021, Moreno returned to his first club Oviedo, being initially assigned to the reserves in the Tercera División RFEF. He made his first team debut on 31 December, starting in a 2–0 success over SD Ponferradina in the Segunda División.

On 6 July 2023, Moreno moved to Primera Federación side CD Arenteiro. On 3 February 2025, he signed a two-and-a-half year contract with Albacete Balompié in the second division, after the club paid his release clause.
