= Borja Bastón =

Spanish footballer (born 1992)

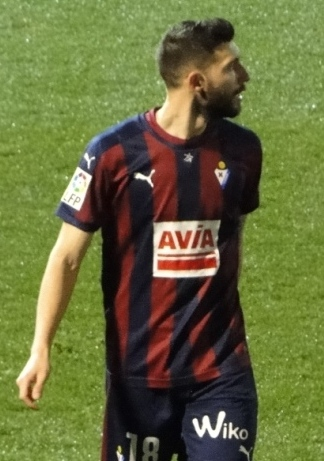
- Borja with Eibar in 2016

Personal information
- Full name: Borja González Tomás
- Date of birth: 25 August 1992 (age 34)
- Place of birth: Madrid, Spain
- Height: 1.86 m (6 ft 1 in)
- Position: Striker

Team information
- Current team: Paju Frontier
- Number: 92

Youth career
- 1996–2009: Atlético Madrid

Senior career*
Years	Team	Apps	(Gls)
2009–2011	Atlético Madrid B	37	(16)
2010–2016	Atlético Madrid	1	(0)
2011–2012	→ Murcia (loan)	20	(4)
2012–2013	→ Huesca (loan)	31	(9)
2013–2014	→ Deportivo La Coruña (loan)	34	(10)
2014–2015	→ Zaragoza (loan)	38	(22)
2015–2016	→ Eibar (loan)	36	(18)
2016–2020	Swansea City	38	(7)
2017–2018	→ Málaga (loan)	20	(2)
2018–2019	→ Alavés (loan)	27	(5)
2020	Aston Villa	2	(0)
2020–2021	Leganés	35	(5)
2021–2024	Oviedo	111	(40)
2024–2025	Pachuca	7	(0)
2025	Granada	11	(0)
2026–	Paju Frontier	17	(7)

International career
2008	Spain U16	3	(6)
2008–2009	Spain U17	22	(12)
2010	Spain U18	2	(1)
2011	Spain U19	2	(0)
- * Club domestic league appearances and goals as of 6 August 2026

Borja González Tomás (born 25 August 1992), known as Borja Bastón, is a Spanish professional footballer who plays as a striker for K League 2 club Paju Frontier.

Trained at Atlético Madrid, he spent much of his tenure out on loan and with Atlético Madrid B, this included successful spells at Deportivo and Zaragoza in the Segunda División and Eibar in La Liga. In 2016 he signed with Swansea City, being loaned twice during his contract.

Borja earned 29 caps and scored 19 goals for Spain at youth level, finishing as top scorer at the 2009 U-17 World Cup and winning the European Under-19 Championship two years later.

== Club career ==
=== Atlético Madrid ===
Born in Madrid, Bastón arrived in his hometown club Atlético Madrid's youth system at the age of four. He began as a goalkeeper, the position which his father played professionally, but he converted him to a forward so that he could enjoy the game more. He made his senior debut in the 2009–10 season, scoring 12 goals for the reserve team in the Segunda División B.

On 15 May 2010, in the campaign's last round, Bastón made his first-team and La Liga debut, coming on as a substitute for Tiago in the 58th minute of the match against Getafe. Twenty minutes later, however, he was stretchered off with a serious anterior cruciate ligament injury on his left knee, in an eventual 0–3 home loss.

Bastón re-appeared with Atlético B seven months after his injury, as a substitute in a 1–0 win over Cacereño. After the match, he stated: "I'm very happy. I've had a really bad time and I've suffered, but now I'm prepared to help the team go up in the table."

In late August 2011, Bastón was loaned to Real Murcia, recently promoted to Segunda División. On 30 August of the following year he moved to Huesca also in a temporary deal, scoring nine times for the latter club during the season as it ended in relegation. On 27 January 2013, he netted in a 2–1 victory at Numancia but was also sent off for a second yellow card.

On 28 August 2013, Bastón joined Deportivo de La Coruña on a two-year loan. After helping his team return to the top flight at the first attempt, he moved to Real Zaragoza of the same league also in a temporary deal, scoring 22 goals in the regular season, contributing to his team's run to the promotion play-off final and earning a spot in the Team of the Season.

Bastón was loaned to Eibar of the top tier on 31 July 2015. He scored his first goals in the competition on 23 September, helping to a 2–2 draw at Levante. He was named the La Liga Player of the Month for October for his goals against Las Palmas, Sevilla and Barcelona.

=== Swansea City ===
On 11 August 2016, Swansea City signed Bastón on a four-year contract for a club record fee of £15.5 million. He made his debut in the Premier League on 18 September under Francesco Guidolin, replacing Jack Cork for the final eight minutes of a 1–0 loss at Southampton. He scored his first goal on 15 October again off the bench, in a 3–2 defeat away to Arsenal in new manager Bob Bradley's first game in charge.

Having started just four matches and having not contributed any more goals as the Swans avoided relegation, Bastón entered talks in May 2017 with manager Paul Clement and the board of directors over his future. On 4 July 2017, he was loaned to Málaga in the Spanish top division for one year; both sides were eventually relegated.

Bastón was loaned again on 16 July 2018, joining Alavés. Back at Swansea for the 2019–20 season, he scored his first goal for them since 2016 in a 2–1 win against Hull City in the first league fixture on 3 August 2019.

=== Aston Villa ===
On 31 January 2020, Bastón joined Aston Villa on a free transfer, leaving Swansea six months before the end of his contract in order to remove himself from their wage bill. Sixteen days after signing, he made his debut as a late substitute in a 3–2 home defeat to Tottenham Hotspur.

Bastón was released on 25 June 2020.

=== Leganés and Oviedo ===
On 6 September 2020, Bastón agreed to a one-year deal with Leganés, recently relegated to the second tier. On 11 August 2021, he moved to Real Oviedo of the same league on a two-year contract. He was crowned top scorer in his debut campaign with 22 goals, alongside Girona's Cristhian Stuani.

=== Later career ===
Bastón split 2024–25 with Pachuca (Mexican Liga MX) and Granada (Spanish second division). He totalled 18 appearances for the sides, failing to score.

On 4 March 2026, aged 33, Bastón signed with K League 2 club Paju Frontier.

== International career ==
Bastón represented Spain's under-17 at the 2009 FIFA World Cup in Nigeria. As the national team finally finished in third position he won the Golden Boot with five goals, with teammate Sergi Roberto adding three.

With the under-19 team, Bastón won the 2011 UEFA European Championship in Romania, but was a support player in a side favouring Álvaro Morata and Juanmi.

== Personal life ==
Bastón's father, Miguel Bastón, was also a footballer. A goalkeeper, he also played with Atlético – but only with their reserves – and spent most of his career with Real Burgos.

== Career statistics ==
As of match played 15 March 2026

Appearances and goals by club, season and competition
Club	Season	League			National cup		League cup		Other		Total	
Club	Season	Division	Apps	Goals	Apps	Goals	Apps	Goals	Apps	Goals	Apps	Goals
Atlético Madrid B	2009–10	Segunda División B	23	12	—		—		—		23	12
Atlético Madrid B	2010–11	Segunda División B	14	4	—		—		—		14	4
Atlético Madrid B	Total		37	16	—		—		—		37	16
Atlético Madrid	2009–10	La Liga	1	0	0	0	—		0	0	1	0
Atlético Madrid	2010–11	La Liga	0	0	0	0	—		0	0	0	0
Atlético Madrid	Total		1	0	0	0	—		0	0	1	0
Murcia (loan)	2011–12	Segunda División	20	4	1	0	—		—		21	4
Huesca (loan)	2012–13	Segunda División	31	9	1	0	—		—		32	9
Deportivo (loan)	2013–14	Segunda División	34	10	0	0	—		—		34	10
Zaragoza (loan)	2014–15	Segunda División	38	22	1	0	—		1 (Note: Appearances in La Liga play-offs)	0	40	22
Eibar (loan)	2015–16	La Liga	36	18	3	1	—		—		39	19
Swansea City	2016–17	Premier League	18	1	1	0	1	0	—		20	1
Swansea City	2019–20	Championship	20	6	0	0	0	0	—		20	6
Swansea City	Total		38	7	1	0	1	0	—		40	7
Málaga (loan)	2017–18	La Liga	20	2	2	0	—		—		22	2
Alavés (loan)	2018–19	La Liga	27	5	2	0	—		—		29	5
Aston Villa	2019–20	Premier League	2	0	0	0	0	0	—		2	0
Leganés	2020–21	Segunda División	35	5	2	0	—		1	0	38	5
Oviedo	2021–22	Segunda División	40	22	0	0	—		—		40	22
Oviedo	2022–23	Segunda División	33	8	3	2	—		—		36	10
Oviedo	2023–24	Segunda División	38	10	1	0	—		4	0	43	10
Pachuca	2024–25	Liga MX	7	0	0	0	—		2 (Note: One appearance in Leagues Cup, one appearance in FIFA Intercontinental Cup)	0	9	0
Granada	2024–25	Segunda División	11	0	0	0	—		—		11	0
Paju Frontier	2026	K League 2	1	1	0	0	—		—		1	1
Career total			449	139	17	3	1	0	8	0	475	142

== Honours ==
Spain U17

- FIFA U-17 World Cup third place: 2009

Spain U19

- UEFA European Under-19 Championship: 2011

Individual

- Pichichi Trophy (Segunda División): 2021–22 (22 goals)
- FIFA U-17 World Cup Golden Boot: 2009
- La Liga Player of the Month: October 2015
