= Yayo (footballer, born 2004) =

Spanish footballer

Personal information
- Full name: Pelayo González Rey
- Date of birth: 30 July 2004 (age 22)
- Place of birth: Oviedo, Spain
- Height: 1.75 m (5 ft 9 in)
- Position: Midfielder

Team information
- Current team: Cultural Leonesa
- Number: 8

Youth career
- 2012–2021: Oviedo

Senior career*
Years	Team	Apps	(Gls)
2021–2024	Oviedo B	92	(1)
2021–2025	Oviedo	5	(0)
2024–2025	→ Lugo (loan)	36	(0)
2025–	Cultural Leonesa	14	(0)
- * Club domestic league appearances and goals as of 9 June 2026

Pelayo González Rey (born 30 July 2004), commonly known as Yayo, is a Spanish footballer who plays as a midfielder for Cultural y Deportiva Leonesa.

== Club career ==
Born in Oviedo, Asturias, Yayo joined Real Oviedo's youth setup at the age of eight. He made his senior debut with the reserves on 5 September 2021, starting in a 5–0 Tercera División RFEF home routing of CD Roces.

Yayo made his first team debut on 1 December 2021, starting and providing an assist to Erik Jirka's goal in a 2–1 away loss against CE Andratx, for the season's Copa del Rey. On 23 February 2023, after establishing himself as a regular starter for the B-team, he renewed his contract with the Carbayones until 2026.

Yayo made his professional debut on 7 May 2023, coming on as a late substitute for Víctor Camarasa in a 2–1 Segunda División home win over Real Zaragoza. On 25 July of the following year, he was loaned to Primera Federación side CD Lugo for the season.

On 15 August 2025, Yayo moved to second division side Cultural y Deportiva Leonesa.
