= Francisco Mascarenhas (footballer) =

Portuguese footballer

Personal information
- Full name: Francisco Fumaça de Mascarenhas da Costa Pessoa
- Date of birth: 15 May 2000 (age 26)
- Place of birth: Cascais, Portugal
- Height: 1.75 m (5 ft 9 in)
- Position: Forward

Team information
- Current team: Waldhof Mannheim
- Number: 11

Youth career
- 2009–2010: Estoril
- 2010–2014: GDS Cascais
- 2014–2016: Estoril
- 2016–2017: Belenenses
- 2017–2020: Estoril
- 2020–2022: Portimonense

Senior career*
Years	Team	Apps	(Gls)
2022–2023	Oviedo B	17	(9)
2023–2025	Oviedo	48	(6)
2025	Eldense	15	(2)
2025–	Waldhof Mannheim	26	(3)
- * Club domestic league appearances and goals as of 29 May 2026

Francisco Fumaça de Mascarenhas da Costa Pessoa (born 15 May 2000), sometimes known as Masca, is a Portuguese professional footballer who plays as a forward for German 3. Liga club Waldhof Mannheim.

== Career ==
Born in Cascais, Mascarenhas began his career with Estorial in 2009, before returning to hometown side GDS Cascais in the following year. He then returned to Estoril in 2014, before spending a one-year spell at Belenenses in the 2016–17 season.

Ahead of the 2018–19 campaign, Mascarenhas was assigned to Estoril's under-23 squad for the newly-created Liga Revelação. On 8 July 2020, he moved to Portimonense, being also assigned to the under-23 team.

On 26 August 2022, Mascarenhas moved abroad and joined Real Oviedo's reserves in Segunda Federación. He made his professional debut on 26 February of the following year, coming on as a second-half substitute for Sergi Enrich in a 1–1 Segunda División home draw against Albacete Balompié.

Mascarenhas scored his first professional goal on 7 May 2023, netting a last-minute winner in a 2–1 home success over Real Zaragoza. Late in the month, he renewed his contract until 2025.

On 2 January 2025, after being rarely used during the season, Mascarenhas moved to fellow second division side Eldense on a six-month contract.

On 30 August 2025, Masca signed with Waldhof Mannheim in German 3. Liga.
