= Mangel (footballer) =

Spanish footballer

Personal information
- Full name: Miguel Ángel Prendes Pérez
- Date of birth: 28 June 2001 (age 25)
- Place of birth: Carreño, Spain
- Height: 1.86 m (6 ft 1 in)
- Position: Midfielder

Team information
- Current team: Avíilés Industrial

Youth career
- Roces
- 2018–2020: Deportivo La Coruña

Senior career*
| Years | Team | Apps | (Gls) |
| 2020–2021 | Deportivo B | 7 | (0) |
| 2021–2022 | Oviedo B | 42 | (3) |
| 2022–2024 | Oviedo | 16 | (0) |
| 2023–2024 | → Ponferradina (loan) | 8 | (0) |
| 2024–2025 | Arenteiro | 34 | (1) |
| 2025–2026 | Gimnàstic | 30 | (0) |
| 2026– | Avíilés Industrial | 0 | (0) |
- * Club domestic league appearances and goals as of 10 June 2026

Miguel Ángel Prendes Pérez (born 28 June 2001), commonly known as Mangel, is a Spanish footballer who plays as a midfielder for Real Avilés Industrial CF.

== Club career ==
Born in Carreño, Asturias, Mangel began his career with CD Roces before joining Deportivo de La Coruña's youth setup in July 2018. He made his senior debut with the latter's reserves on 5 January 2020, coming on as a late substitute in a 0–0 Tercera División away draw against Arosa SC.

On 1 July 2020, after finishing his formation, Mangel was definitely promoted to Dépor's B-team. On 1 August of the following year, after featuring rarely, he moved to Real Oviedo and was assigned to the B-side in Tercera División RFEF.

Mangel made his first team debut on 10 January 2022, replacing Marco Sangalli in a 1–1 home draw against SD Eibar in the Segunda División. On 26 January of the following year, he renewed his contract with the Carbayones until 2026.

On 14 July 2023, Mangel was loaned to Primera Federación side SD Ponferradina for the season. Upon returning, he terminated his link with Oviedo on 28 June 2024, and signed for fellow third tier side CD Arenteiro on 11 July.

On 3 July 2025, after being regularly used, Mangel agreed to a two-year deal with Gimnàstic de Tarragona still in division three. He terminated his link on 17 July of the following year, and moved to fellow league team Real Avilés Industrial CF just hours later.
