= Viti (footballer) =

Spanish footballer

Personal information
- Full name: Víctor Álvarez Rozada
- Date of birth: 16 September 1997 (age 29)
- Place of birth: Pola de Laviana, Spain
- Height: 1.70 m (5 ft 7 in)
- Positions: Right-back; winger

Team information
- Current team: Las Palmas
- Number: 17

Youth career
- 2012–2016: Oviedo

Senior career*
| Years | Team | Apps | (Gls) |
| 2015–2020 | Oviedo B | 39 | (4) |
| 2016–2024 | Oviedo | 149 | (4) |
| 2024– | Las Palmas | 59 | (0) |
- * Club domestic league appearances and goals as of 3 June 2026

Víctor Álvarez Rozada (born 16 September 1997), commonly known as Viti, is a Spanish footballer who plays for Las Palmas as either a right-back or a right winger.

== Club career ==
=== Oviedo ===
Viti was born in Pola de Laviana, Laviana, Asturias. A Real Oviedo youth graduate, he made his senior debut with the reserves on 10 May 2015, aged only 17, coming on as a second-half substitute in a 1–0 away win against Atlético de Lugones SD in the Tercera División.

Despite being still registered with the Juvenil squad, Viti was called up to the first team for a Segunda División match against CD Leganés on 26 May 2016. He made his professional debut just hours later, replacing Jon Erice in the 79th minute of the 0–1 home defeat.

Viti scored his first senior goal on 13 November 2016, netting the equalizer in a 1–1 home draw against Sporting de Gijón B. The following 7 May, he renewed his contract with the club.

On 11 June 2019, Viti was one of the seven players from the B-side who were promoted to the main squad for the 2019–20 campaign. He scored his first professional goal on 15 August 2021, netting the opener in a 2–2 home draw against CD Lugo.

On 14 January 2022, after being regularly used under manager José Ángel Ziganda, Viti renewed his contract with the Carbayones until 2024. In December 2023, he started to feature as a right-back due to the injuries of Lucas Ahijado and Mario Hernández, and subsequently became a first-choice in that position.

=== Las Palmas ===
On 1 July 2024, free agent Viti signed a three-year contract with La Liga side UD Las Palmas.
