= Dani Calvo =

Spanish footballer (born 1994)

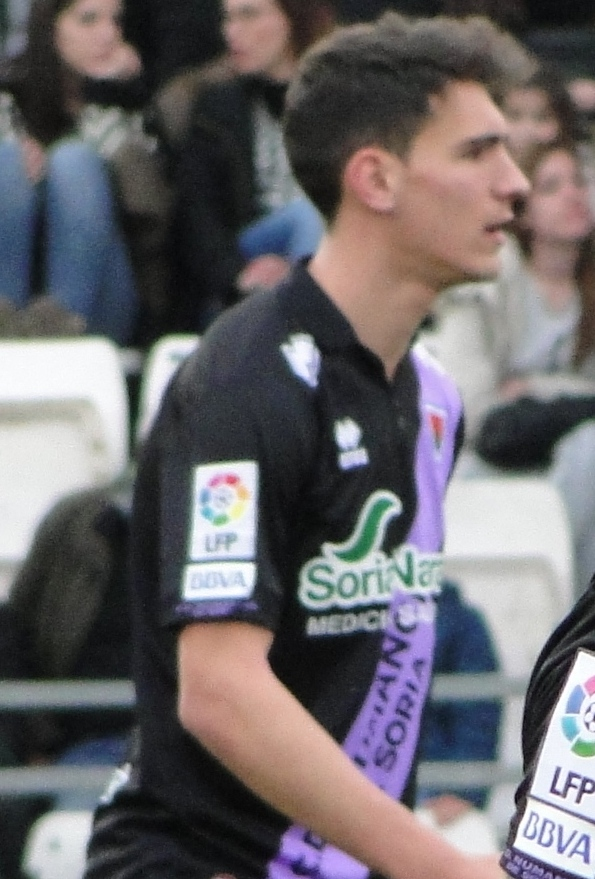
- Calvo with Numancia in 2015

Personal information
- Full name: Daniel Pedro Calvo San Román
- Date of birth: 1 April 1994 (age 32)
- Place of birth: Huesca, Spain
- Height: 1.90 m (6 ft 3 in)
- Position: Centre-back

Team information
- Current team: Oviedo
- Number: 12

Youth career
- Peñas Oscenses
- 2012–2013: Numancia

Senior career*
| Years | Team | Apps | (Gls) |
| 2013–2015 | Numancia B | 59 | (4) |
| 2014–2019 | Numancia | 72 | (3) |
| 2015–2016 | → Levante B (loan) | 30 | (1) |
| 2019 | → Elche (loan) | 20 | (1) |
| 2019–2021 | Elche | 60 | (3) |
| 2021– | Oviedo | 185 | (8) |
- * Club domestic league appearances and goals as of 20:30, 3 October 2026 (UTC)

Daniel "Dani" Pedro Calvo San Román (born 1 April 1994) is a Spanish professional footballer who plays as a centre-back for Segunda División club Real Oviedo.

== Club career ==
=== Numancia ===
Born in Huesca, Aragon, Calvo began his career with CD Peñas Oscenses. He signed with CD Numancia to complete his development aged 18, being promoted to the reserves in 2013.

On 8 June 2014, Calvo played his first match as a professional, starting in a 1–1 home draw against SD Eibar in the Segunda División. In August 2015 he joined another reserve team, Atlético Levante UD on loan for one year.

Calvo featured regularly after his return, scoring his first professional goal on 4 February 2017 by opening the 3–2 away win over AD Alcorcón. Later that month, he extended his contract until 2020.

=== Elche ===
On 24 December 2018, relegated to the bench by newly-signed Derik Osede, Calvo was loaned to fellow second division club Elche CF until June. The following May, having avoided relegation, he agreed to a permanent deal.

Calvo contributed 41 appearances in the 2019–20 season, as his side achieved promotion in the play-offs. He made his La Liga debut on 26 September 2020, starting in a 0–3 home loss against Real Sociedad. He scored his first goal in the league on 20 February 2021, the only in a victory over SD Eibar also at the Estadio Martínez Valero.

=== Oviedo ===
On 27 July 2021, free agent Calvo signed a two-year contract with Real Oviedo in the second tier.

== Personal life ==
Calvo's father, Ramón, was also a footballer and a defender. He represented Deportivo de La Coruña and Real Valladolid at the professional level.

== Career statistics ==
As of match played 29 May 2022

Appearances and goals by club, season and competition
| Club | Season | League | | | National Cup | | Other | | Total | |
| Club | Season | Division | Apps | Goals | Apps | Goals | Apps | Goals | Apps | Goals |
|---|---|---|---|---|---|---|---|---|---|---|
| Numancia | 2013–14 | Segunda División | 1 | 0 | 0 | 0 | — | | 1 | 0 |
| Numancia | 2014–15 | Segunda División | 13 | 0 | 1 | 0 | — | | 14 | 0 |
| Numancia | 2016–17 | Segunda División | 24 | 3 | 0 | 0 | — | | 24 | 3 |
| Numancia | 2017–18 | Segunda División | 27 | 0 | 5 | 0 | 1 (Note: Appearances in La Liga play-offs) | 0 | 33 | 0 |
| Numancia | 2018–19 | Segunda División | 7 | 0 | 0 | 0 | — | | 7 | 0 |
| Numancia | Total | | 72 | 3 | 6 | 0 | 1 | 0 | 79 | 3 |
| Levante B (loan) | 2015–16 | Segunda División B | 30 | 1 | — | | — | | 30 | 1 |
| Elche (loan) | 2018–19 | Segunda División | 20 | 1 | 0 | 0 | — | | 20 | 1 |
| Elche | 2019–20 | Segunda División | 37 | 1 | 2 | 0 | 4 | 0 | 43 | 1 |
| Elche | 2020–21 | La Liga | 23 | 2 | 2 | 0 | — | | 25 | 2 |
| Elche | Total | | 60 | 3 | 4 | 0 | 4 | 0 | 68 | 3 |
| Oviedo | 2021–22 | Segunda División | 41 | 1 | 0 | 0 | — | | 41 | 1 |
| Career total | | | 223 | 9 | 10 | 0 | 5 | 0 | 238 | 9 |
