= Jimmy Suárez =

Spanish footballer

Jimmy
Personal information
- Full name: Jaime Suárez Juesas
- Date of birth: 31 December 1996 (age 29)
- Place of birth: Oviedo, Spain
- Height: 1.70 m (5 ft 7 in)
- Position: Midfielder

Team information
- Current team: Huesca

Youth career
- Colegio Los Robles
- Centro Asturiano
- Astur
- Oviedo

Senior career*
Years	Team	Apps	(Gls)
2015–2019	Oviedo B	87	(8)
2015–2016	→ Astur (loan)	37	(1)
2019–2024	Oviedo	137	(1)
2024–2026	AEK Larnaca	47	(1)
2026–	Huesca	0	(0)
- * Club domestic league appearances and goals as of 13:37, 28 May 2026 (UTC)

Jaime Suárez Juesas (born 31 December 1996), commonly known as Jimmy, is a Spanish footballer who plays as a midfielder for SD Huesca.

== Club career ==
Born in Oviedo, Asturias, Jimmy represented Colegio Los Robles, Fútbol Centro Asturiano Oviedo, Astur CF and Real Oviedo as a youth. In 2015, after finishing his formation, he was loaned back to his former side Astur in Tercera División, for one year.

After being a regular starter, Jimmy returned to his parent club in July 2016 and was assigned to the B-team also in the fourth division. He made his first team debut on 31 March 2019, starting in a 1–1 Segunda División home draw against Deportivo de La Coruña.

On 1 May 2019, Jimmy extended his contract until 2022, being definitely promoted to the main squad for the following campaign. He scored his first professional goal on 26 February 2023, netting the opener in a 1–1 home draw against Albacete Balompié.

On 28 June 2024, Jimmy left the Carbayones and moved abroad after signing for Cypriot First Division side AEK Larnaca FC. On 12 July 2026, he returned to his home country after agreeing to a two-year deal with Primera Federación side SD Huesca.

== Career statistics ==
As of match played 6 July 2025

Club	Season	League			Cup		Continental		Other		Total	
Club	Season	Division	Apps	Goals	Apps	Goals	Apps	Goals	Apps	Goals	Apps	Goals
Oviedo	2018–19	Segunda División	10	0	0	0	—		—		10	0
Oviedo	2019–20	Segunda División	23	0	0	0	—		—		23	0
Oviedo	2020–21	Segunda División	15	0	2	0	—		—		17	0
Oviedo	2021–22	Segunda División	35	0	1	0	—		—		36	0
Oviedo	2022–23	Segunda División	23	1	3	0	—		—		26	1
Oviedo	2023–24	Segunda División	31	0	2	0	—		—		33	0
Oviedo	Total		137	1	8	0	—		—		145	1
AEK Larnaca	2024–25	Cypriot First Division	13	0	4	1	2	0	—		19	1
Career total			150	1	12	1	2	0	0	0	164	2

== Honours ==
AEK Larnaca

- Cypriot Cup: 2024–25
