= Hugo Rama =

Spanish footballer

Personal information
- Full name: Hugo José Rama Calviño
- Date of birth: 22 November 1996 (age 29)
- Place of birth: Sigüeiro, Spain
- Height: 1.77 m (5 ft 10 in)
- Position: Midfielder

Team information
- Current team: Athens Kallithea
- Number: 80

Youth career
- Celta
- 2013–2014: Xuventude Oroso
- 2014–2015: Deportivo La Coruña

Senior career*
Years	Team	Apps	(Gls)
2014	Sigüeiro	1	(1)
2015–2017	Deportivo B	41	(3)
2017–2018	Cerceda	36	(0)
2018–2022	Lugo	68	(4)
2018–2019	→ Mirandés (loan)	36	(6)
2022–2023	Oviedo	45	(1)
2023–2025	Deportivo La Coruña	44	(2)
2026–	Athens Kallithea	6	(1)
- * Club domestic league appearances and goals as of 21 April 2026

Hugo José Rama Calviño (born 22 November 1996) is a Galician professional footballer who plays as a central midfielder for Super League Greece 2 club Athens Kallithea.

== Club career ==
Born in Sigüeiro, Oroso, A Coruña, Galicia, Rama represented Celta de Vigo and ED Xuventude Oroso as a youth. He made his senior debut with hometown side Sigüeiro FC on 7 September 2014, starting and scoring the equalizer in a 1–2 home loss against Cordeiro FC for the Primera Autonómica championship.

Rama subsequently moved to Deportivo de La Coruña; initially assigned to the youth setup, he featured sparingly with the reserves in Tercera División. In August 2017, he joined Segunda División B side CCD Cerceda.

On 25 January 2018, Rama signed a contract with CD Lugo, effective as of 1 July. On 7 August, however, he was loaned to third division side CD Mirandés for one year.

Rama was an undisputed starter for the Castilian-Leonese side, scoring a career-best six goals as the club achieved promotion to the second division, but suffering a serious knee injury in the play-offs. On 24 July, he extended his contract with Lugo until 2022.

Rama was declared fit to play only in January 2020, and made his professional debut on 15 January by coming on as a second-half substitute for Álex López in a 0–1 away loss against Rayo Vallecano.

Rama scored his first professional goal on 21 October 2020, netting his team's second in a 3–0 home win over Girona FC. On 31 January 2022, he left Lugo on a mutual agreement, and signed a two-and-a-half-year deal with fellow second division side Real Oviedo just hours later.

On 31 August 2023, Rama terminated his contract with the Carbayones, and returned to Dépor on a two-year contract just hours later, now being assigned to the first team in Primera Federación.
