= Oier Luengo =

Spanish footballer

Personal information
- Full name: Oier Luengo Redondo
- Date of birth: 11 November 1997 (age 29)
- Place of birth: Amorebieta, Spain
- Height: 1.83 m (6 ft 0 in)
- Position: Centre-back

Team information
- Current team: Burgos
- Number: 3

Youth career
- Amorebieta

Senior career*
Years	Team	Apps	(Gls)
2016–2018	Amorebieta	44	(3)
2018–2021	Bilbao Athletic	45	(2)
2019	→ Amorebieta (loan)	18	(1)
2021–2022	Amorebieta	31	(0)
2022–2026	Oviedo	78	(4)
2026	→ Burgos (loan)	7	(0)
2026–	Burgos	0	(0)
- * Club domestic league appearances and goals as of 6 June 2026

Oier Luengo Redondo (born 11 November 1997) is a Spanish footballer who plays as a central defender for Burgos CF, on loan from Real Oviedo.

== Club career ==
Born in Amorebieta-Etxano, Biscay, Basque Country, Luengo was a SD Amorebieta youth graduate. He made his first team debut on 30 October 2016, coming on as a late substitute for goalscorer Koldo Obieta in a 1–2 Segunda División B home loss against CD Toledo.

Luengo established himself as a starter in the 2017–18 season, and scored his first senior goal on 16 September 2017 by netting his side's second in a 2–3 home loss to Real Sociedad B. On 13 June of the following year, he signed for Athletic Bilbao and was assigned to the reserves also in the third division.

On 7 January 2019, after featuring rarely for the Lions, Luengo was loaned back to his former club Amorebieta until June. Upon returning, he started to feature more regularly, but still left the club on 14 June 2021 as his contract was due to expire.

In July 2021, free agent Luengo returned to Amorebieta, with the club now in Segunda División. He made his professional debut on 14 August, starting in a 0–2 away loss against Girona FC.

On 4 July 2022, after Amorebieta's relegation, Luengo signed for fellow second division side Real Oviedo on a two-year contract. He scored his first professional goal on 2 March 2024, netting the equalizer in a 3–2 home win over Levante UD.

Luengo was regularly used during the 2024–25 season, contributing with two goals in 33 matches overall as the Carbayones achieved promotion to La Liga; in October 2024, he already had renewed his link until 2027. He made his debut in the category on 15 August 2025, starting in a 2–0 loss to Villarreal CF.

On 24 January 2026, after being rarely used, Luengo was loaned to Burgos CF in the second level until June, with an obligatory buyout clause in case of promotion. On 8 July, he signed a permanent three-year deal with the club.
