= Lucas Ahijado =

Spanish footballer

Personal information
- Full name: Lucas Ahijado Quintana
- Date of birth: 30 January 1995 (age 31)
- Place of birth: Oviedo, Spain
- Height: 1.73 m (5 ft 8 in)
- Position: Right-back

Youth career
- Oviedo

Senior career*
Years	Team	Apps	(Gls)
2013–2019	Oviedo B	184	(23)
2014–2026	Oviedo	163	(3)
- * Club domestic league appearances and goals as of 26 May 2026

Lucas Ahijado Quintana (born 30 January 1995) is a Spanish footballer. Mainly a right-back, he can also play as a right winger.

== Career ==
Born in Oviedo, Asturias Ahijado was a Real Oviedo youth graduate. He made his senior debut with the reserves in the 2013–14 campaign, in Tercera División championship.

Ahijado made his first team debut on 13 April 2014, coming on as a substitute for goalscorer Néstor Susaeta in a 5–1 Segunda División B home routing of Celta de Vigo B. On 15 February 2016, he renewed his contract until 2018.

Ahijado made his professional debut on 6 September 2017, replacing Yaw Yeboah in a 0–1 home loss against CD Numancia, for the season's Copa del Rey. He helped the B-side in their promotion to Segunda División B in the following year, and was promoted to the main squad in Segunda División on 11 June 2019.

Ahijado scored his first professional goal on 17 May 2021, netting the winner in a 1–0 home success over Málaga CF. On 13 April 2023, after establishing himself as a regular starter, he renewed his contract until 2025.

On 10 July 2025, after helping the Carbayones to achieve promotion to La Liga, Ahijado agreed to a one-year extension. He made his debut in the category on 13 September, replacing injured Nacho Vidal in the first half of a 2–0 away loss to Getafe CF.

On 15 June 2026, after Oviedo's relegation back to the second division, Ahijado left the club after 176 official matches.
