= Real Oviedo Vetusta =

Spanish association football team

- Full name: Real Oviedo, S.A.D. Vetusta
- Nicknames: Carbayones (Azules); Blues (Oviedistas)
- Founded: 1929; 97 years ago (Reformed in 2006; 20 years ago)
- Ground: Ciudad Deportiva El Requexón, Oviedo, Asturias, Spain
- Capacity: 3,000
- President: Martín Peláez
- Head coach: Roberto Aguirre
- League: Segunda Federación – Group 1
- 2025–26: Segunda Federación – Group 1, 2nd of 18
Home colours	Away colours	Third colours

Real Oviedo Vetusta is a Spanish football club based in Oviedo, in the autonomous community of Asturias. Founded in 1929 as Unión Sportiva Ovetense, it is the reserve team of Real Oviedo, and currently plays in Segunda Federación – Group 1, holding home games at El Requexón, with a 3,000-seat capacity.

== History ==
Founded in 1929 as Unión Sportiva Ovetense, the club was renamed to Sociedad Deportiva Vetusta in 1940. Vetusta reached the national categories ten years later, and even enjoyed 11 seasons in the third division, with two four-year spells.

Following the first team's relegation into the fourth level, the club disappeared in 2003, being re-formed three years later and regaining part of its original denomination (Vetusta) in 2008. After returning to Tercera División, Group 2, the club finished 8th in the 2010–11 season.

=== Club background ===
- Unión Sportiva Ovetense (1929–1940)
- Sociedad Deportiva Vetusta (1940–1979)
- Real Oviedo Aficionados (1979–1989)
- Sociedad Deportiva Vetusta (1989–1991)
- Real Oviedo B (1991–2003; 2006–2021)
- Real Oviedo Vetusta (2021–present)

== Season to season ==
- As a farm team

Season	Tier	Division	Place	Copa del Rey
1931–32	5	2ª Reg.		
1932–33	5	2ª Reg.		
1934–34	3	3ª	3rd	
1934–35	5	2ª Reg.		
1935–36	5	2ª Reg.		
1939–40	4	1ª Reg.	2nd	First round
1940–41	4	1ª Reg.	6th	
1941–42	3	1ª Reg.	9th	
1942–43	4	2ª Reg.		
1943–44	4	1ª Reg.	6th	
1944–45	4	1ª Reg.	5th	
1945–46	4	1ª Reg.		
1946–47	4	1ª Reg.	2nd	
1947–48	4	1ª Reg.	2nd	
1948–49	4	1ª Reg.	4th	
1949–50	4	1ª Reg.	1st	
1950–51	3	3ª	13th	
1951–52	3	3ª	9th	
1952–53	3	3ª	15th	
1953–54	4	1ª Reg.	4th	

Season	Tier	Division	Place	Copa del Rey
1954–55	4	1ª Reg.	2nd	
1955–56	4	1ª Reg.	10th	
1956–57	5	2ª Reg.		
1957–58	5	2ª Reg.		
1958–59	5	2ª Reg.		
1959–60	5	2ª Reg.	1st	
1960–61	4	1ª Reg.	4th	
1961–62	4	1ª Reg.	1st	
1962–63	3	3ª	4th	
1963–64	3	3ª	13th	
1964–65	3	3ª	6th	
1965–66	3	3ª	7th	
1966–67	3	3ª	7th	
1967–68	3	3ª	6th	
1968–69	3	3ª	13th	
1969–70	3	3ª	7th	First round
1970–71	3	3ª	19th	First round
1971–72	4	1ª Reg.	3rd	
1972–73	4	1ª Reg.	10th	
1973–74	4	Reg. Pref.	14th	

Season	Tier	Division	Place	Copa del Rey
1974–75	4	Reg. Pref.	12th	
1975–76	4	Reg. Pref.	12th	
1976–77	4	Reg. Pref.	9th	
1977–78	5	Reg. Pref.	4th	
1978–79	5	Reg. Pref.	1st	
1979–80	4	3ª	9th	First round
1980–81	4	3ª	16th	First round
1981–82	4	3ª	9th	
1982–83	4	3ª	3rd	

Season	Tier	Division	Place	Copa del Rey
1983–84	4	3ª	5th	Second round
1984–85	4	3ª	9th	Second round
1985–86	4	3ª	11th	
1986–87	4	3ª	7th	
1987–88	4	3ª	1st	
1988–89	3	2ª B	19th	
1989–90	4	3ª	1st	
1990–91	3	2ª B	10th	

- As a reserve team

Season	Tier	Division	Place
1991–92	3	2ª B	11th
1992–93	3	2ª B	9th
1993–94	3	2ª B	11th
1994–95	3	2ª B	17th
1995–96	4	3ª	2nd
1996–97	3	2ª B	12th
1997–98	3	2ª B	12th
1998–99	3	2ª B	13th
1999–00	3	2ª B	18th
2000–01	4	3ª	2nd
2001–02	3	2ª B	18th
2002–03	4	3ª	4th
2003–2006	DNP		
2006–07	7	2ª Reg.	2nd
2007–08	7	2ª Reg.	2nd
2008–09	6	1ª Reg.	1st
2009–10	5	Reg. Pref.	2nd
2010–11	4	3ª	8th

Season	Tier	Division	Place
2011–12	4	3ª	17th
2012–13	4	3ª	5th
2013–14	4	3ª	12th
2014–15	4	3ª	3rd
2015–16	4	3ª	7th
2016–17	4	3ª	5th
2017–18	4	3ª	1st
2018–19	3	2ª B	5th
2019–20	3	2ª B	12th
2020–21	3	2ª B	7th / 4th
2021–22	5	3ª RFEF	1st
2022–23	4	2ª Fed.	7th
2023–24	4	2ª Fed.	16th
2024–25	5	3ª Fed.	1st
2025–26	4	2ª Fed.	2nd
2026–27	4	2ª Fed.	

- 14 seasons in Segunda División B
- 4 seasons in Segunda Federación
- 34 seasons in Tercera División
- 2 seasons in Tercera Federación/Tercera División RFEF

== Current squad ==
As of 7 September 2026.

Note: Flags indicate national team as defined under FIFA eligibility rules; some limited exceptions apply. Players may hold more than one non-FIFA nationality.

No.	Pos.	Nation	Player
1	GK	GEO	Mate Sauri
2	DF	ESP	Adri Fernández
4	DF	ESP	Iker Navarro
5	DF	ESP	Adri Lopes
6	MF	ESP	Gerard Marquez
7	MF	ESP	Jaime Fuentes
8	MF	ESP	Cheli Pereda
9	FW	ESP	Óscar de la Hera
11	DF	ESP	Martín Lavilla
13	GK	ESP	Samu Franganillo
14	FW	SEN	Lamine Gueye
15	MF	SEN	Mapathe Thiam

No.	Pos.	Nation	Player
16	MF	AND	Ot Remolins
18	FW	NGA	Saturday Meelubari
19	FW	ESP	Miguel Clavería
20	FW	ESP	Isi Angulo
21	MF	ESP	Héctor González
23	DF	ESP	Diego Espi
24	FW	ESP	Jaime Coballes
28	MF	ESP	Enzo Pérez
29	DF	ESP	Arturo Arribas
30	MF	ESP	Marcos Sánchez
31	MF	ESP	Enzo Cazorla
32	DF	ESP	Xavi Vicente

=== From Youth Academy ===
Note: Flags indicate national team as defined under FIFA eligibility rules; some limited exceptions apply. Players may hold more than one non-FIFA nationality.

No.	Pos.	Nation	Player

=== Out on loan ===
Note: Flags indicate national team as defined under FIFA eligibility rules; some limited exceptions apply. Players may hold more than one non-FIFA nationality.

No.	Pos.	Nation	Player
—	DF	ESP	Marcos Lopes (at Numancia until 30 June 2027)

=== Current technical staff ===
Position	Staff
Manager	(Spain) Roberto Aguirre
Assistant Manager	(Spain) Andrés Vallina
Fitness coach	(Spain) Jorge Tejada
Goalkeeper Coach	(Spain) Sergio Segura
Analyst	(Spain) Alfonso Velasco
Doctor	(Spain) Mario Martín Becerra
Physiotherapist	(Spain) Esteban Corral
Match delegate	(Spain) Jon Carrera
Kit man	(Spain) Miguel Aparicio
Pitch delegate	(Spain) Miguel Partida

Last updated: September 2022
Source: Real Oviedo Official Website

== Honours ==
- Tercera División: 1987–88, 1989–90, 2017–18
