= 2025–26 Copa del Rey =

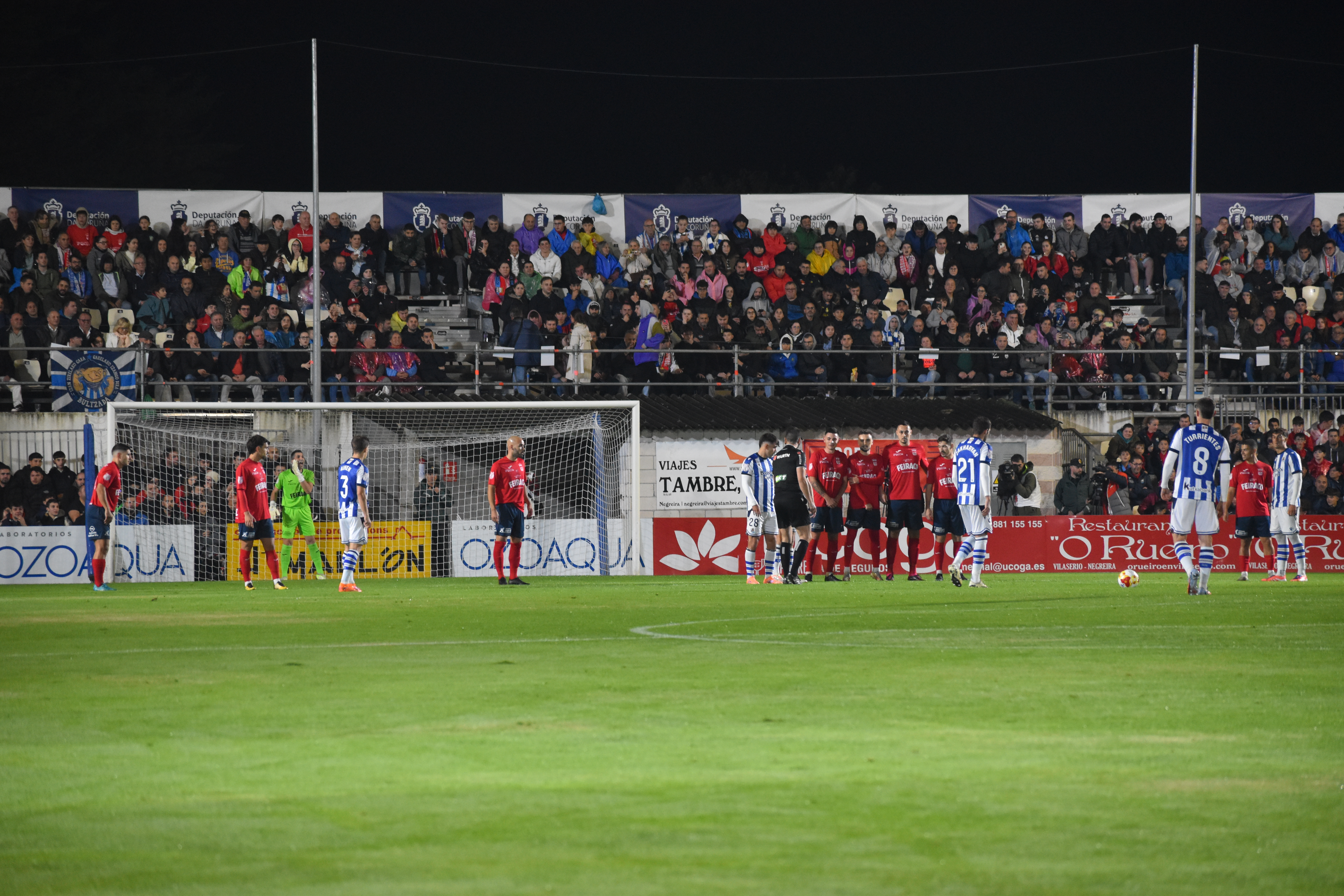
- Negreira v Real Sociedad on 28 October 2025

Tournament details
- Country: Spain
- Date: 27 September 2025 – 18 April 2026
- Teams: 126

Final positions
- Champions: Real Sociedad (3rd title)
- Runners-up: Atlético Madrid

Tournament statistics
- Top goal scorer(s): Raúl García (7 goals)

The 2025–26 Copa del Rey (branded as the Copa del Rey MAPFRE for sponsorship reasons) was the 124th staging of the Copa del Rey (including two seasons where two rival editions were played). The winners were assured a place in the 2026–27 UEFA Europa League league stage. Both the winners and the runners-up would qualify for the four-team 2027 Supercopa de España.

Barcelona were the defending champions, having beaten Real Madrid in the final of the previous edition, but were eliminated by Atlético Madrid in the semi-finals.

The final was held at La Cartuja in Seville on 18 April 2026. Real Sociedad defeated Atlético Madrid 4–3 on penalties to win their third Copa del Rey title.

As across Spain, match times up to 26 October 2024 and from 30 March 2025 are CEST (UTC+2). Times on interim ("winter") days are CET (UTC+1). Matches played in the Canary Islands use the WET (UTC±00:00).

== Schedule and format ==
On 30 June 2025, the RFEF introduced changes in the format of the competition, with the preliminary stage becoming a two-legged tie. The first and second rounds remained a single match, but a new criteria of geographical proximity was created to define which teams would face each other in these rounds. In the round of 32 and in the round of 16, Supercopa de España teams were separated into a new pot, facing the teams from lowest divisions in both rounds.

Round	Draw date	Date	Fixtures	Clubs	Format details
Preliminary round	16 September 2025	27 September 2025	20	126 → 116	New entries: Clubs qualify through the 2024–25 sixth tier. Opponents seeding: Teams face each other according to proximity criteria. Knock-out tournament type: Double match.
Preliminary round	16 September 2025	4 October 2025	20	126 → 116	New entries: Clubs qualify through the 2024–25 sixth tier. Opponents seeding: Teams face each other according to proximity criteria. Knock-out tournament type: Double match.
First round	6 October 2025	29 October 2025	56	116 → 60	New entries: All qualified teams except for the four participants in the Supercopa de España. Opponents seeding: Teams from lowest divisions faced La Liga teams according to proximity criteria. Local team seeding: Matches were played at home stadiums of teams in lower divisions. Knock-out tournament type: Single match.
Second round	11 November 2025	3 December 2025	28	60 → 32	Opponents seeding: Teams from lowest divisions faced La Liga teams. Local team seeding: Matches were played at home stadiums of teams in lower divisions. Knock-out tournament type: Single match.
Round of 32	9 December 2025	17 December 2025	16	32 → 16	New entries: Clubs participating in the Supercopa de España entered at this stage. Opponents seeding: Teams from lowest divisions faced Supercopa and La Liga teams, respectively. Local team seeding: Matches were played at home stadiums of teams in lower divisions. Knock-out tournament type: Single match.
Round of 16	7 January 2026	14 January 2026	8	16 → 8	Opponents seeding: Teams from lowest divisions faced Supercopa and La Liga teams, respectively. Local team seeding: Matches were played at home stadiums of teams in lower divisions. Knock-out tournament type: Single match.
Quarter-finals	19 January 2026	4 February 2026	4	8 → 4	Opponents seeding: Luck of the draw. Local team seeding: Matches were played at home stadiums of teams in lower divisions. Knock-out tournament type: Single match.
Semi-finals	6 February 2026	11 February 2026	2	4 → 2	Opponents seeding: Luck of the draw. Local team seeding: Luck of the draw. Knock-out tournament type: Double match.
Semi-finals	6 February 2026	4 March 2026	2	4 → 2	Opponents seeding: Luck of the draw. Local team seeding: Luck of the draw. Knock-out tournament type: Double match.
Final	6 February 2026	18 April 2026	1	2 → 1	Single match at Estadio de La Cartuja, Seville. Both teams qualified for the 2027 Supercopa de España. UEFA Europa League qualification: winners qualified for the 2026–27 UEFA Europa League group stage.

Notes

- Games ending in a draw were decided in extra time and, if still level, by a penalty shoot-out.

== Qualified teams ==
The following teams qualified for the competition. Reserve teams were not allowed to enter.

La Liga; All 20 teams of the 2024–25 season	Segunda División; All 22 teams of the 2024–25 season	Primera Federación; Top five non-reserve teams of each group of the 2024–25 season	Segunda Federación; Top five non-reserve teams of the five groups of the 2024–25 season	Tercera Federación; The best non-reserve teams plus the best seven non-reserve runners-up of each one of the eighteen groups of the 2024–25 season	Copa Federación; The four semi-finalists of the 2025 Copa Federación de España	Regional leagues One team of each one of the twenty groups of the sixth tier
Alavés; Athletic Bilbao (Note: Athletic Bilbao, Atlético Madrid, Barcelona and Real Madrid joined the tournament in the round of 32 as participants of the Supercopa de España.); Atlético Madrid; Barcelona^{TH}; Celta Vigo; Espanyol; Getafe; Girona; Las Palmas; Leganés; Mallorca; Osasuna; Rayo Vallecano; Real Betis; Real Madrid; Real Sociedad; Sevilla; Valencia; Valladolid; Villarreal	Albacete; Almería; Burgos; Cádiz; Cartagena; Castellón; Córdoba; Deportivo La Coruña; Eibar; Elche; Eldense; Granada; Huesca; Levante; Málaga; Mirandés; Oviedo; Racing Ferrol; Racing Santander; Sporting Gijón; Tenerife; Zaragoza	Andorra; Antequera; Ceuta; Cultural Leonesa; Gimnàstic; Ibiza; Mérida; Murcia; Ponferradina; Tarazona	Arenas Getxo; Atlético Antoniano; Atlético Baleares; Ávila; Avilés Industrial; Cacereño; Estepona; Europa; Guadalajara; Juventud Torremolinos; Langreo; La Unión Atlético; SD Logroñés; UD Logroñés; Navalcarnero; Numancia; Pontevedra; Rayo Majadahonda; Sabadell; Sant Andreu; Talavera de la Reina; Teruel; Torrent; UCAM Murcia; Utebo	Alcalá; Atlético Astorga; Atlético Tordesillas; Azuaga; Caudal; Cieza; Ciudad de Lucena; Constància; Ebro; Extremadura; Jaén; Lorca Deportiva; Mutilvera; Náxara; UD Ourense; Poblense; Portugalete; Puente Genil; Quintanar del Rey; Reus FCR; Roda; Tropezón; Sámano; San Fernando; Valle de Egüés	Atlètic Lleida; Orihuela; Ourense CF; Toledo	Alberite; Atlètic Sant Just; Atlético Calatayud; Atlético Melilla; Atlético Palma del Río; Betis Valladolid; Campanario; Getxo; Inter de Valdemoro; Los Garres; Lourdes; Manises; Maracena; Negreira; Puerto de Vega; Sant Jordi; Sporting de Ceuta; Textil Escudo; Universitario; Yuncos

== Preliminary round ==
=== Draw ===
Teams were divided into four groups according to geographical criteria.

Group 1	Group 2	Group 3	Group 4
Alberite; Betis Valladolid; Getxo; Negreira; Puerto de Vega; Textil Escudo	Atlético Calatayud; Atlètic Sant Just; Lourdes; Sant Jordi	Atlético Melilla; Atlético Palma del Río; Los Garres; Manises; Maracena; Sporting de Ceuta	Campanario; Inter de Valdemoro; Universitario; Yuncos

=== Summary ===
Team 1	Agg.	Team 2	1st leg	2nd leg
Textil Escudo	2–5	Negreira	2–1	0–4
Puerto de Vega	5–1	Alberite	4–0	1–1
Getxo	2–1	Betis Valladolid	0–0	2–1
Atlètic Sant Just	7–1	Atlético Calatayud	3–0	4–1
Sant Jordi	4–1	Lourdes	1–0	3–1
Manises	2–4	Los Garres	2–0	0–4 (a.e.t.)
Atlético Melilla	0–10	Atlético Palma del Río	0–5	0–5
Sporting de Ceuta	1–3	Maracena	1–1	0–2
Campanario	0–2	Yuncos	0–0	0–2
Inter de Valdemoro	4–2	Universitario	1–1	3–1 (a.e.t.)

=== First leg ===
27 September 2025	Textil Escudo	2–1	Negreira	Cabezón de la Sal
18:00				Stadium: Juan María Parés Serra

27 September 2025	Puerto de Vega	4–0	Alberite	Puerto de Vega
17:15				Stadium: El Campón

27 September 2025	Getxo	0–0	Betis Valladolid	Getxo
17:00				Stadium: Campo Municipal de Fadura

27 September 2025	Atlètic Sant Just	3–0	Atlético Calatayud	Sant Just Desvern
16:30				Stadium: Municipal

27 September 2025	Sant Jordi	1–0	Lourdes	Sant Jordi, Palma
17:30				Stadium: Municipal

27 September 2025	Manises	2–0	Los Garres	Manises
18:00				Stadium: Campo Vicente Martínez Catalá

27 September 2025	Atlético Melilla	0–5	Atlético Palma del Río	Melilla
20:00				Stadium: La Espiguera

27 September 2025	Sporting de Ceuta	1–1	Maracena	Ceuta
18:00				Stadium: José Martínez Pirri

27 September 2025	Campanario	0–0	Yuncos	Campanario
18:45				Stadium: Municipal

27 September 2025	Inter de Valdemoro	1–1	Universitario	Valdemoro
20:00				Stadium: Estadio Amelia del Castillo

=== Second leg ===
4 October 2025	Negreira	4–0 (5–2 agg.)	Textil Escudo	Negreira
17:30				Stadium: Jesús García Calvo

4 October 2025	Alberite	1–1 (1–5 agg.)	Puerto de Vega	Alberite
16:45				Stadium: Marino Sáenz

4 October 2025	Betis Valladolid	1–2 (1–2 agg.)	Getxo	Valladolid
17:00				Stadium: Finca Canterac

4 October 2025	Atlético Calatayud	1–4 (1–7 agg.)	Atlètic Sant Just	Calatayud
17:30				Stadium: San Íñigo

4 October 2025	Lourdes	1–3 (1–4 agg.)	Sant Jordi	Tudela
17:30				Stadium: CDM Clara Campoamor

4 October 2025	Los Garres	4–0 (a.e.t.) (4–2 agg.)	Manises	Murcia
18:00				Stadium: Las Tejeras

4 October 2025	Atlético Palma del Río	5–0 (10–0 agg.)	Atlético Melilla	Palma del Río
18:00				Stadium: Estadio Sergio León

4 October 2025	Maracena	2–0 (3–1 agg.)	Sporting de Ceuta	Maracena
18:30				Stadium: Ciudad Deportiva de Maracena

4 October 2025	Yuncos	2–0 (2–0 agg.)	Campanario	Yuncos
18:00				Stadium: Complejo Deportivo Villa de Yuncos

4 October 2025	Universitario	1–3 (a.e.t.) (2–4 agg.)	Inter de Valdemoro	Las Palmas
20:00 WET				Stadium: Campo Nicolás Sánchez Santana

== First round ==
The first round was played by 112 of the 116 qualified teams, with the exceptions being the four participants of the 2026 Supercopa de España.

This first round remained a single match, but a new criteria of geographical proximity was created to define which teams would face each other.

A total of 56 matches were played between 28 and 30 October 2025.

=== Draw ===
The draw for the first round was held on 6 October 2025. Teams were divided into four pots.

Pot 1 Group 1	Pot 2 Group 2	Pot 3 Group 3	Pot 4 Group 4
Alavés; Celta Vigo; Oviedo; Real Sociedad; Burgos; Cultural Leonesa; Deportivo La Coruña; Eibar; Mirandés; Racing Santander; Sporting Gijón; Valladolid; Arenas Getxo; Avilés Industrial; Ponferradina; Pontevedra; Racing Ferrol; Atlético Astorga; Ávila; Langreo; SD Logroñés; UD Logroñés; Náxara; Numancia; UD Ourense; Sámano; Atlético Tordesillas; Caudal; Portugalete; Tropezón; Ourense CF; Getxo; Negreira; Puerto de Vega	Espanyol; Girona; Mallorca; Osasuna; Andorra; Huesca; Zaragoza; Europa; Gimnàstic; Sabadell; Tarazona; Teruel; Atlético Baleares; Ebro; Mutilvera; Poblense; Reus FCR; Sant Andreu; Utebo; Constància; Valle de Egüés; Atlètic Lleida; Atlètic Sant Just; Sant Jordi	Elche; Levante; Real Betis; Sevilla; Valencia; Villarreal; Almería; Cádiz; Castellón; Ceuta; Córdoba; Granada; Málaga; Antequera; Cartagena; Eldense; Juventud Torremolinos; Murcia; Atlético Antoniano; Estepona; Jaén; La Unión Atlético; Lorca Deportiva; Puente Genil; Torrent; UCAM Murcia; Cieza; Ciudad de Lucena; Roda; Orihuela; Toledo; Atlético Palma del Río; Los Garres; Maracena	Getafe; Rayo Vallecano; Albacete; Las Palmas; Leganés; Cacereño; Guadalajara; Ibiza; Mérida; Talavera de la Reina; Tenerife; Alcalá; Extremadura; Navalcarnero; Quintanar del Rey; Rayo Majadahonda; Azuaga; San Fernando; Inter de Valdemoro; Yuncos

=== Group 1 ===
28 October 2025	Ourense CF (3)	4–2 (a.e.t.)	Oviedo (1)	Ourense
19:00	Ramos 53'; Jelbat 90+4'; Ouhdadi 98'; Bouzaig 114'	Report	Brekalo 17' (pen.); Ilić 61'	Stadium: O Couto; Referee: Adrián Cordero Vega

28 October 2025	Atlético Tordesillas (5)	1–2 (a.e.t.)	Burgos (2)	Tordesillas
19:00	Chatún 63'	Report	I. Martínez 90+4'; Lizancos 116'	Stadium: Las Salinas; Referee: Eder Mallo Fernández

28 October 2025	SD Logroñés (4)	0–4	Racing Santander (2)	Logroño
19:30		Report	Camara 23'; Cabanzón 66', 87'; Yurrieta 89'	Stadium: Estadio Las Gaunas; Referee: Alonso De Ena Wolf

28 October 2025	Langreo (4)	0–0 (a.e.t.) (3–4 p)	Racing Ferrol (3)	Langreo
19:30		Report		Stadium: Ganzábal

28 October 2025	Tropezón (5)	1–3	Cultural Leonesa (2)	Tanos, Torrelavega
20:00	Madroño 84'	Report	Paraschiv 17' (pen.); Ribeiro 55'; Mboula 90+4'	Stadium: Santa Ana

28 October 2025	Negreira (6)	0–3	Real Sociedad (1)	Negreira
21:00		Report	Goti 12'; Zakharyan 54'; Turrientes 82'	Stadium: Jesús García Calvo; Referee: Isidro Díaz de Mera Escuderos

29 October 2025	Atlético Astorga (4)	1–1 (a.e.t.) (3–4 p)	Mirandés (2)	Astorga
20:00		Report		Stadium: La Eragudina

29 October 2025	Náxara (4)	2–4	Eibar (2)	Haro (Note: Náxara did not play the match in their main stadium La Salera, Nájera, as it did not meet the broadcasting requirements.)
20:00		Report		Stadium: Municipal Luis de la Fuente

29 October 2025	Caudal (5)	0–1	Sporting Gijón (2)	Mieres
20:00		Report		Stadium: Hermanos Antuña

29 October 2025	Numancia (4)	3–0	Arenas Getxo (3)	Soria
20:00		Report		Stadium: Los Pajaritos

29 October 2025	Portugalete (5)	1–0	Valladolid (2)	Portugalete
20:00		Report		Stadium: La Florida

29 October 2025	UD Ourense (4)	1–1 (a.e.t.) (0–3 p)	Pontevedra (3)	Ourense
20:30		Report		Stadium: O Couto

30 October 2025	Puerto de Vega (6)	0–2	Celta Vigo (1)	Navia (Note: Puerto de Vega did not play the match in their main stadium El Campón, Puerto de Vega, as it did not meet the broadcasting requirements.)
19:00		Report		Stadium: El Pardo

30 October 2025	Getxo (6)	0–7	Alavés (1)	Getxo
20:00		Report		Stadium: Gobela (Note: Getxo did not play the match in their main stadium Campo Municipal de Fadura, Getxo, as it did not meet the broadcasting requirements.)

30 October 2025	Ávila (4)	1–0 (a.e.t.)	Avilés Industrial (3)	Ávila
20:00		Report		Stadium: Estadio Adolfo Suárez

30 October 2025	UD Logroñés (4)	1–3	Ponferradina (3)	Logroño
20:00		Report		Stadium: Estadio Las Gaunas

30 October 2025	Sámano (4)	1–5	Deportivo La Coruña (2)	Castro Urdiales (Note: Sámano did not play the match in their main stadium Estadio Vallegón, Sámano, as it did not meet the broadcasting requirements.)
21:00		Report		Stadium: Estadio Riomar

=== Group 2 ===
28 October 2025	Constància (5)	2–3 (a.e.t.)	Girona (1)	Inca
19:00		Report		Stadium: Nou Camp

28 October 2025	Utebo (4)	0–3	Huesca (2)	Utebo
20:30		Report		Stadium: Santa Ana

29 October 2025	Poblense (4)	1–2 (a.e.t.)	Sabadell (3)	Sa Pobla
18:00		Report		Stadium: Nou Camp

29 October 2025	Sant Jordi (6)	0–5	Osasuna (1)	Palma (Note: Sant Jordi did not play the match in their main stadium Municipal, Sant Jordi, Palma, as it did not meet the broadcasting requirements.)
19:00		Report		Stadium: Camp de Son Malferit

29 October 2025	Mutilvera (4)	1–3	Zaragoza (2)	Mutilva Baja, Aranguren
19:00		Report		Stadium: Valle Araguren

29 October 2025	Ebro (4)	1–1 (a.e.t.) (4–3 p)	Tarazona (3)	Zaragoza
19:00		Report		Stadium: Estadio Pedro Sancho (Note: Ebro did not play the match in their main stadium Campo Municipal de Fútbol La Almozara, Zaragoza, as it did not meet the broadcasting requirements.)

29 October 2025	Atlètic Sant Just (6)	0–2	Mallorca (1)	L'Hospitalet (Note: Atlètic Sant Just did not play the match in their main stadium Municipal, Sant Just Desvern, as it did not meet the broadcasting requirements.)
20:00		Report		Stadium: Municipal de L'Hospitalet

29 October 2025	Sant Andreu (4)	2–1 (a.e.t.)	Teruel (3)	Barcelona
20:00		Report		Stadium: Narcís Sala

29 October 2025	Reus FCR (4)	2–2 (a.e.t.) (4–3 p)	Europa (3)	Reus
20:30		Report		Stadium: Estadi Municipal de Reus

30 October 2025	Valle de Egüés (5)	1–5	Andorra (2)	Egüés
19:30		Report		Stadium: Sarriguren

30 October 2025	Atlético Baleares (4)	2–0	Gimnàstic (3)	Palma
20:00		Report		Stadium: Estadi Balear

30 October 2025	Atlètic Lleida (4)	1–2	Espanyol (1)	Lleida
21:00		Report		Stadium: Camp d'Esports

=== Group 3 ===
28 October 2025	UCAM Murcia (4)	1–3	Cádiz (2)	Murcia
19:30		Report		Stadium: La Condomina

28 October 2025	Maracena (6)	0–5	Valencia (1)	Granada (Note: Maracena did not play the match in their main stadium Ciudad Deportiva, Maracena, as it did not meet the broadcasting requirements.)
20:00		Report	Duro 55'; Raba 60'; López 67'; Rioja 75'; Danjuma 80'	Stadium: Estadio Nuevo Los Cármenes; Referee: Francisco José Hernández Maeso

28 October 2025	Roda (5)	1–5	Granada (2)	Villarreal
20:00		Report		Stadium: Ciutat Esportiva Pamesa Ceràmica

28 October 2025	Toledo (5)	1–4	Sevilla (1)	Toledo
21:00		Report		Stadium: Salto del Caballo

29 October 2025	Los Garres (6)	0–4	Elche (1)	Murcia (Note: Los Garres did not play the match in their main stadium Las Tejeras, Los Garres, as it did not meet the broadcasting requirements.)
19:00		Report	Adam 18'; Neto 45+1'; Mendoza 45+4'; Redondo 76'	Stadium: Estadio Nueva Condomina; Attendance: 8,000; Referee: Mateo Busquets Ferrer

29 October 2025	La Unión Atlético (4)	0–2	Ceuta (2)	Totana
19:30		Report		Stadium: Juan Cayuela

29 October 2025	Torrent (4)	3–1	Juventud Torremolinos (3)	Torrent
20:00		Report		Stadium: San Gregorio

29 October 2025	Lorca Deportiva (4)	0–2	Almería (2)	Lorca
20:00		Report		Stadium: Francisco Artés Carrasco

29 October 2025	Cieza (5)	1–0	Córdoba (2)	Cieza
20:00		Report		Stadium: La Arboleja

29 October 2025	Puente Genil (4)	0–1	Cartagena (3)	Puente Genil
20:30		Report		Stadium: Manuel Polinario "Poli"

29 October 2025	Ciudad de Lucena (5)	0–6	Villarreal (1)	Lucena
21:00		Report		Stadium: Ciudad de Lucena

29 October 2025	Jaén (4)	1–3	Eldense (3)	Jaén
21:00		Report		Stadium: Nuevo La Victoria

30 October 2025	Orihuela (4)	3–4	Levante (1)	Orihuela
19:00		Report		Stadium: Los Arcos

30 October 2025	Atlético Antoniano (4)	1–0	Castellón (2)	Lebrija
20:00		Report		Stadium: Municipal de Lebrija

30 October 2025	Estepona (4)	1–3	Málaga (2)	Estepona
21:00		Report		Stadium: Francisco Muñoz Pérez

30 October 2025	Atlético Palma del Río (6)	1–7	Real Betis (1)	Palma del Río
21:00		Report		Stadium: Estadio Sergio León

30 October 2025	Murcia (3)	1–1 (a.e.t.) (2–1 p)	Antequera (3)	Murcia
21:00		Report		Stadium: Nueva Condomina

=== Group 4 ===
28 October 2025	Inter de Valdemoro (6)	0–11	Getafe (1)	Getafe (Note: Inter de Valdemoro did not play the match in their main stadium El Restón, Valdemoro, as it did not meet the broadcasting requirements.)
20:00		Report	Martín 21'; Juanmi 26' (pen.), 36', 45', 48'; Muñoz 52', 66'; Neyou 56'; Joselu 70'; Mayoral 72', 76'	Stadium: Estadio Coliseum; Referee: Iosu Galech Apezteguía

28 October 2025	Guadalajara (3)	2–1	Cacereño (3)	Guadalajara
20:00	Neskes 41' (pen.); Mayo 83'	Report	Berlanga 90+4'	Stadium: Estadio Pedro Escartín; Referee: Luis Enrique Morona del Campo

28 October 2025	Rayo Majadahonda (4)	1–4	Talavera de la Reina (3)	Majadahonda
20:00		Report		Stadium: Estadio Cerro del Espino

28 October 2025	San Fernando (5)	0–3	Albacete (2)	Las Palmas (Note: UD San Fernando did not play the match in their main stadium Ciudad Deportiva, Maspalomas, as it did not meet the broadcasting requirements.)
20:00 WET		Report		Stadium: Estadio Gran Canaria

28 October 2025	Alcalá (4)	0–4	Tenerife (3)	Alcalá de Henares
20:30		Report		Stadium: Municipal del Val

28 October 2025	Extremadura (4)	3–1	Las Palmas (2)	Almendralejo
21:00		Report		Stadium: Estadio Francisco de la Hera

29 October 2025	Navalcarnero (4)	2–1	Mérida (3)	Navalcarnero
20:00		Report		Stadium: Mariano González

29 October 2025	Azuaga (5)	1–4	Leganés (2)	Azuaga
20:00		Report		Stadium: Municipal

29 October 2025	Yuncos (6)	1–6	Rayo Vallecano (1)	Yuncos
21:00		Report		Stadium: Complejo Deportivo Villa de Yuncos

29 October 2025	Quintanar del Rey (4)	1–1 (a.e.t.) (4–3 p)	Ibiza (3)	Quintanar del Rey
21:00		Report		Stadium: San Marcos

== Second round ==
=== Draw ===
The draw for the second round was held on 11 November 2025. Teams were divided in two groups.

This second round maintains the criteria of geographical proximity.

A total of 28 matches were played between 2 and 4 December 2025.

Pot 1 Group 1	Pot 2 Group 2
Alavés; Celta Vigo; Espanyol; Girona; Mallorca; Osasuna; Real Sociedad; Andorra; Burgos; Cultural Leonesa; Deportivo La Coruña; Eibar; Huesca; Mirandés; Racing Santander; Sporting Gijón; Zaragoza; Ponferradina; Pontevedra; Racing Ferrol; Sabadell; Atlético Baleares; Ebro; Numancia; Reus FCR; Sant Andreu; Portugalete; Ourense CF	Elche; Getafe; Levante; Rayo Vallecano; Real Betis; Sevilla; Valencia; Villarreal; Albacete; Almería; Cádiz; Ceuta; Granada; Leganés; Málaga; Cartagena; Eldense; Guadalajara; Murcia; Talavera de la Reina; Tenerife; Atlético Antoniano; Ávila; Extremadura; Navalcarnero; Quintanar del Rey; Torrent; Cieza

=== Group 1 ===
2 December 2025	Numancia (4)	2–3	Mallorca (1)	Soria
19:00	González 54'; Danese 75'	Report	Llabrés 7'; Prats 24', 64' (pen.)	Stadium: Los Pajaritos; Attendance: 3,654; Referee: César Soto Grado

2 December 2025	Racing Ferrol (3)	0–2	Huesca (2)	Ferrol
19:00		Report	Pérez 15'; Ntamack 72'	Stadium: Estadio Municipal de A Malata; Attendance: 1,100; Referee: Germán Cid Camacho

2 December 2025	Portugalete (5)	0–3	Alavés (1)	Portugalete
21:00		Report	Vicente 3'; Tapiador 71' (o.g.); Martínez 90+1'	Stadium: La Florida; Attendance: 3,050; Referee: Alejandro Muñiz Ruiz

2 December 2025	Ebro (4)	3–5	Osasuna (1)	Zaragoza (Note: Ebro did not play the match in their main stadium Campo Municipal de Fútbol La Almozara, Zaragoza, as it did not meet the broadcasting requirements.)
19:00	Soeiro 45+1'; Prat 80'; Charlez 90+3' (pen.)	Report	García 49' (pen.), 78'; Gómez 84'; Becker 88'; Muñoz 90+7'	Stadium: Ibercaja Stadium; Referee: Miguel Sesma Espinosa

3 December 2025	Mirandés (2)	0–2	Sporting Gijón (2)	Vitoria-Gasteiz (Note: Mirandés did not play the match in their main stadium Estadio Municipal de Anduva, Miranda de Ebro. Alavés and the Vitoria City Council reached an agreement for Mirandés to use their stadium as an alternative venue while the renovation and adaptation of the new stand at the Anduva stadium was carried out.)
20:00		Report	Coundoul 14'; Rodríguez 19'	Stadium: Campo de fútbol de Mendizorroza

3 December 2025	Cultural Leonesa (2)	4–2	Andorra (2)	León
20:00	Pastoriza 29'; Cortés 51'; Fornos 69'; Ribeiro 89'	Report	Jastin 42'; Le Normand 65'	Stadium: Estadio Reino de León

3 December 2025	Ourense CF (3)	2–1	Girona (1)	Ourense
21:00	Yuste 1'; Ouhdadi 64'	Report	Asprilla 25'	Stadium: O Couto; Referee: Alejandro Hernández Hernández

3 December 2025	Reus FCR (4)	0–2	Real Sociedad (1)	Reus
21:00		Report	Goti 49'; Sadiq 90+3' (pen.)	Stadium: Estadi Municipal de Reus; Referee: Juan Martínez Munuera

3 December 2025	Pontevedra (3)	0–3	Eibar (2)	Pontevedra
21:00		Report	Martón 30'; Corpas 65'; Magunacelaya 77'	Stadium: Pasarón; Referee: Miguel González Díaz

4 December 2025	Atlético Baleares (4)	1–0	Espanyol (1)	Palma
19:00	Tovar 54'	Report		Stadium: Estadi Balear; Referee: Alejandro Quintero González

4 December 2025	Sabadell (3)	0–2	Deportivo La Coruña (2)	Sabadell
19:00		Report	Herrera 54'; Rubén 80'	Stadium: Nova Creu Alta; Attendance: 7,651; Referee: Alonso De Ena Wolf

4 December 2025	Ponferradina (3)	1–2 (a.e.t.)	Racing Santander (2)	Ponferrada
20:00	Pau 69'	Report	Carlos Arana 53'; Aldasoro 119'	Stadium: Estadio El Toralín; Referee: Daniel Palencia Caballero

4 December 2025	Sant Andreu (4)	1–1 (a.e.t.) (6–7 p)	Celta Vigo (1)	Barcelona
21:00	García 103'	Report	Iglesias 105'	Stadium: Narcís Sala
	Penalties
	García (penalty scored); Marcet (penalty scored); Blanco (penalty scored); Naranjo (penalty scored); Lucas Viña (penalty scored); Torices (penalty scored); Serrano (penalty missed)		(penalty scored) Mingueza; (penalty scored) Iglesias; (penalty scored) Aspas; (penalty scored) Álvarez; (penalty scored) Beltrán; (penalty scored) Durán; (penalty scored) Lago

4 December 2025	Zaragoza (2)	0–1 (a.e.t.)	Burgos (2)	Zaragoza
21:00		Report	González 116'	Stadium: Ibercaja Stadium; Referee: Gorka Etayo Herrera

=== Group 2 ===
2 December 2025	Guadalajara (3)	1–0	Ceuta (2)	Guadalajara
20:00	Cañizo 44'	Report		Stadium: Estadio Pedro Escartín

2 December 2025	Navalcarnero (4)	2–3 (a.e.t.)	Getafe (1)	Navalcarnero
21:00	Perera 6'; Pérez 14'	Report	Calado 69' (o.g.); Martín 88'; Montes 111'	Stadium: Mariano González

3 December 2025	Eldense (3)	2–1	Almería (2)	Elda
20:00	Bellari 54'; Quintana 65'	Report	Soko 30'	Stadium: Estadio Municipal Nuevo Pepico Amat

3 December 2025	Talavera de la Reina (3)	2–1	Málaga (2)	Talavera de la Reina
20:00	Montero 55', 65'	Report	Niño 88'	Stadium: Estadio El Prado

3 December 2025	Murcia (3)	3–2	Cádiz (2)	Murcia
20:00	Schalk 14'; Benito 21'; Vicente 48'	Report	Diarra 53'; Dawda 77'	Stadium: Nueva Condomina

3 December 2025	Cieza (5)	0–1	Levante (1)	Cieza
21:00		Report	Koyalipou 57'	Stadium: La Arboleja

3 December 2025	Atlético Antoniano (4)	1–1 (a.e.t.) (3–5 p)	Villarreal (1)	Lebrija
21:00	García 109'	Report	Pérez 102'	Stadium: Municipal de Lebrija; Referee: Francisco José Hernández Maeso
	Penalties
	Pedraza (penalty scored); Pana (penalty scored); Durán (penalty missed); Arreola (penalty scored)		(penalty scored) Parejo; (penalty scored) Gueye; (penalty scored) Mikautadze; (penalty scored) Pérez; (penalty scored) Akhomach

3 December 2025	Quintanar del Rey (4)	1–2 (a.e.t.)	Elche (1)	Quintanar del Rey
21:00	Iglesias 70'	Report	Houary 48'; Fort 117'	Stadium: San Marcos; Attendance: 3,000; Referee: José Luis Guzmán Mansilla

3 December 2025	Torrent (4)	1–4	Real Betis (1)	Valencia (Note: Torrent did not play the match in their main stadium Estadio San Gregorio, Torrent, due to problems with the stadium renovation work.)
21:00	Corbalán 85'	Report	Riquelme 11', 43', 75'; Ortiz 90'	Stadium: Estadio Ciutat de València; Attendance: 6,680; Referee: José María Sánchez Santos

4 December 2025	Leganés (2)	1–2	Albacete (2)	Leganés
19:00	García 90+2'	Report	Marvel 51' (o.g.); Lazo 61'	Stadium: Estadio Ontime Butarque; Referee: Luis Bestard Servera

4 December 2025	Ávila (4)	1–2 (a.e.t.)	Rayo Vallecano (1)	Ávila
19:00	Pascual 50'	Report	Palazón 90+4'; García 120'	Stadium: Estadio Adolfo Suárez; Referee: Adrián Cordero Vega

4 December 2025	Cartagena (3)	1–2 (a.e.t.)	Valencia (1)	Cartagena
21:00	Ortuño 21'	Report	Beltrán 79'; Jesús Vázquez 120+1'	Stadium: Estadio Municipal Cartagonova; Referee: Isidro Díaz De Mera Escuderos

4 December 2025	Extremadura (4)	1–2	Sevilla (1)	Almendralejo
21:00	Zarfino 48'	Report	Alfon 31'; Romero 38'	Stadium: Estadio Francisco de la Hera; Referee: Javier Alberola Rojas

4 December 2025	Tenerife (3)	0–1	Granada (2)	Santa Cruz de Tenerife
22:00 WET		Report	Alcaraz 61'	Stadium: Estadio Heliodoro Rodríguez López; Referee: Manuel Ángel Pérez Hernández

== Round of 32 ==
=== Draw ===
The draw for the round of 32 was held on 9 December 2025 in the RFEF headquarters in Las Rozas. The four participant teams of the 2026 Supercopa de España were drawn with the teams from the lowest category. The remaining teams from the lowest categories faced the rest of La Liga teams. Matches were played at stadiums of lower-ranked teams.

A total of 16 matches were played between 16 December 2025 and 6 January 2026. The match involving Rayo Vallecano was played during the week of 5 January due to a clash with the UEFA Conference League league phase during the same week.

Pot 1; 4 participants in 2026 Supercopa de España	Pot 2; 13 teams of La Liga	Pot 3; 9 teams of Segunda División	Pot 4; 4 teams of Primera Federación	Pot 5; 1 team of Segunda Federación	Pot 6; 1 team of Copa Federación
Athletic Bilbao; Atlético Madrid; Barcelona; Real Madrid	Alavés; Celta Vigo; Elche; Getafe; Levante; Mallorca; Osasuna; Rayo Vallecano; Real Betis; Real Sociedad; Sevilla; Valencia; Villarreal	Albacete; Burgos; Cultural Leonesa; Deportivo La Coruña; Eibar; Granada; Huesca; Racing Santander; Sporting Gijón	Eldense; Guadalajara; Murcia; Talavera de la Reina	Atlético Baleares	Ourense CF

=== Matches ===
16 December 2025	Eibar (2)	0–1	Elche (1)	Eibar
19:00		Report	Boayar 27'	Stadium: Ipurúa; Attendance: 2,426; Referee: Alejandro Quintero González

16 December 2025	Deportivo La Coruña (2)	1–0	Mallorca (1)	A Coruña
19:00	Carrillo 85'	Report		Stadium: Riazor; Attendance: 17,873; Referee: Miguel Ángel Ortiz Arias

16 December 2025	Eldense (3)	1–2	Real Sociedad (1)	Elda
21:00	Quintana 81'	Report	Sučić 79'; Marín 90+6'	Stadium: Nuevo Pepico Amat; Attendance: 3,392; Referee: Francisco José Hernández Maeso

16 December 2025	Sporting Gijón (2)	0–2	Valencia (1)	Gijón
21:00		Report	Beltrán 4'; Raba 48'	Stadium: El Molinón – Enrique Castro "Quini"; Attendance: 16,275; Referee: Alejandro Muñiz Ruiz

16 December 2025	Guadalajara (3)	0–2	Barcelona (1)	Guadalajara
21:30		Report	Christensen 76'; Rashford 90'	Stadium: Pedro Escartín; Referee: César Soto Grado

17 December 2025	Cultural Leonesa (2)	1–0	Levante (1)	León
18:00	Tresaco 12'	Report		Stadium: Reino de León; Attendance: 5,542; Referee: Jesús Gil Manzano

17 December 2025	Atlético Baleares (4)	2–3	Atlético Madrid (1)	Palma
19:00	Bonet 28'; Keita 90' (pen.)	Report	Griezmann 16', 72'; Raspadori 20'	Stadium: Estadi Balear; Attendance: 5,080; Referee: Alejandro Hernández Hernández

17 December 2025	Albacete (2)	2–2 (a.e.t.) (3–0 p)	Celta Vigo (1)	Albacete
19:00	Jefté 18'; Vallejo 90+3'	Report	Lago 64'; Iglesias 75'	Stadium: Carlos Belmonte; Attendance: 12,106; Referee: José Luis Guzmán Mansilla
	Penalties
	Puertas (penalty scored); Riki (penalty scored); Vallejo (penalty scored)		(penalty missed) Mingueza; (penalty missed) Álvarez; (penalty missed) Aspas

17 December 2025	Racing Santander (2)	2–1	Villarreal (1)	Santander
19:00	Arana 6', 28'	Report	Pérez 86'	Stadium: El Sardinero; Attendance: 20,768; Referee: Isidro Díaz De Mera Escuderos

17 December 2025	Huesca (2)	2–4 (a.e.t.)	Osasuna (1)	Huesca
19:00	Luna 35'; Kortajarena 105+1'	Report	Ra. García 45+1', 95'; Osambela 111'; Budimir 118'	Stadium: El Alcoraz; Attendance: 6,413; Referee: Víctor García Acosta

17 December 2025	Talavera de la Reina (3)	2–3	Real Madrid (1)	Talavera de la Reina
21:00	Arroyo 80'; Di Renzo 90+1'	Report	Mbappé 41' (pen.), 88'; Farrando 45+1' (o.g.)	Stadium: El Prado; Attendance: 4,200; Referee: Guillermo Cuadra Fernández

17 December 2025	Alavés (1)	1–0	Sevilla (1)	Vitoria-Gasteiz
21:00	Vicente 79' (pen.)	Report		Stadium: Mendizorroza; Attendance: 9,766; Referee: Miguel Sesma Espinosa

18 December 2025	Burgos (2)	3–1	Getafe (1)	Burgos
19:00	González 45+4' (pen.); Córdoba 57', 73'	Report	Sancris 32'	Stadium: El Plantío; Attendance: 7,987; Referee: Ricardo de Burgos Bengoetxea

18 December 2025	Ourense CF (3)	0–1 (a.e.t.)	Athletic Bilbao (1)	Ourense
19:00		Report	Jauregizar 105+1'	Stadium: O Couto; Referee: José Luis Munuera Montero

18 December 2025	Murcia (3)	0–2	Real Betis (1)	Murcia
21:00		Report	Hernández 30' (pen.); Piñeiro 85' (o.g.)	Stadium: Nueva Condomina; Referee: Juan Martínez Munuera

6 January 2026	Granada (2)	1–3	Rayo Vallecano (1)	Granada
19:00	Sáenz 9'	Report	García 49'; Díaz 74'; Flores 90+2' (o.g.)	Stadium: Nuevo Los Cármenes; Attendance: 4,468; Referee: César Soto Grado

== Round of 16 ==
=== Draw ===
The draw for the round of 16 was held on 7 January 2026 in the RFEF headquarters in Las Rozas. The four teams participating in the 2026 Supercopa de España were drawn with the Segunda División teams. The remaining Segunda División team was drawn against a La Liga team. Matches were played at the stadiums of the lower-ranked teams, otherwise the first team drawn played at home.

A total of eight matches were played between 13 and 15 January 2026.

Pot 1; 4 participants in 2026 Supercopa de España	Pot 2; 7 teams of La Liga	Pot 3; 5 teams of Segunda División
Athletic Bilbao; Atlético Madrid; Barcelona; Real Madrid	Alavés; Elche; Osasuna; Rayo Vallecano; Real Betis; Real Sociedad; Valencia	Albacete; Burgos; Cultural Leonesa; Deportivo La Coruña; Racing Santander

=== Matches ===
13 January 2026	Cultural Leonesa (2)	3–4 (a.e.t.)	Athletic Bilbao (1)	León
21:00	Calero 16', 27'; Sobrino 41' (pen.)	Report	Guruzeta 26', 38'; Sancet 45+3' (pen.); Gómez 104' (pen.)	Stadium: Reino de León; Attendance: 11,004; Referee: Alejandro Hernández Hernández

13 January 2026	Real Sociedad (1)	2–2 (a.e.t.) (4–3 p)	Osasuna (1)	San Sebastián
21:00	Turrientes 75'; Zubeldia 90+2'	Report	Moncayola 4'; Oyarzabal 17' (o.g.)	Stadium: Reale Arena; Attendance: 30,147; Referee: César Soto Grado
	Penalties
	Oyarzabal (penalty scored); Guedes (penalty scored); Soler (penalty scored); Gómez (penalty scored); Zakharyan (penalty missed)		(penalty scored) Budimir; (penalty missed) Moncayola; (penalty scored) Torró; (penalty scored) Galán; (penalty missed) Catena

13 January 2026	Deportivo La Coruña (2)	0–1	Atlético Madrid (1)	A Coruña
21:00		Report	Griezmann 61'	Stadium: Riazor; Attendance: 28,577; Referee: Ricardo de Burgos Bengoetxea

14 January 2026	Albacete (2)	3–2	Real Madrid (1)	Albacete
21:00	Villar 42'; Betancor 82', 90+4'	Report	Mastantuono 48'; G. García 90+1'	Stadium: Carlos Belmonte; Attendance: 16,800; Referee: Victor García Verdura

14 January 2026	Real Betis (1)	2–1	Elche (1)	Seville
21:00	Ávila 68', 80'	Report	Pétrot 58'	Stadium: La Cartuja; Attendance: 37,635; Referee: Jesús Gil Manzano

14 January 2026	Alavés (1)	2–0	Rayo Vallecano (1)	Vitoria-Gasteiz
21:00	Martínez 49'; Vicente 89'	Report		Stadium: Mendizorroza; Attendance: 10,634; Referee: Francisco José Hernández Maeso

15 January 2026	Racing Santander (2)	0–2	Barcelona (1)	Santander
21:00		Report	Torres 66'; Yamal 90+5'	Stadium: El Sardinero; Attendance: 22,481; Referee: José María Sánchez Martínez

15 January 2026	Burgos (2)	0–2	Valencia (1)	Burgos
21:00		Report	Iranzo 10'; Sadiq 50'	Stadium: El Plantío; Attendance: 9,405; Referee: José Luis Munuera Montero

== Quarter-finals ==
=== Draw ===
The draw for the quarter-finals was held on 19 January 2026 in the RFEF headquarters in Las Rozas. When possible, matches were played at the stadiums of the lower-ranked teams, otherwise the first team drawn played at home.

A total of four matches were played between 3 and 5 February 2026.

Pot 1; 7 teams of La Liga	Pot 2; 1 team of Segunda División
Alavés; Athletic Bilbao; Atlético Madrid; Barcelona; Real Betis; Real Sociedad; Valencia	Albacete

=== Matches ===
3 February 2026	Albacete (2)	1–2	Barcelona (1)	Albacete
21:00	Moreno 87'	Report	Yamal 39'; Araújo 56'	Stadium: Carlos Belmonte; Attendance: 16,745; Referee: José Luis Munuera Montero

4 February 2026	Alavés (1)	2–3	Real Sociedad (1)	Vitoria-Gasteiz
21:00	Abde 8'; Martínez 29' (pen.)	Report	Oyarzabal 15'; Guedes 76'; Óskarsson 80'	Stadium: Mendizorroza; Attendance: 18,874; Referee: Alejandro Quintero González

4 February 2026	Valencia (1)	1–2	Athletic Bilbao (1)	Valencia
21:00	Sadiq 35'	Report	Sadiq 26' (o.g.); I. Williams 90+6'	Stadium: Mestalla; Attendance: 46,931; Referee: Victor García Verdura

5 February 2026	Real Betis (1)	0–5	Atlético Madrid (1)	Seville
21:00		Report	Hancko 12'; Simeone 30'; Lookman 37'; Griezmann 62'; Almada 83'	Stadium: La Cartuja; Attendance: 66,810; Referee: César Soto Grado

== Semi-finals ==
=== Draw ===
The draw for the semi-finals was held on 6 February 2026 at 13:00 CET, in the RFEF headquarters in Las Rozas.

First leg matches were played on 11 and 12 February, and second leg matches were played on 3 and 4 March 2026.

Qualified teams
4 teams of La Liga
- Athletic Bilbao
- Atlético Madrid
- Barcelona
- Real Sociedad

=== Summary ===
Team 1	Agg.	Team 2	1st leg	2nd leg
Atlético Madrid (1)	4–3	Barcelona (1)	4–0	0–3
Athletic Bilbao (1)	0–2	Real Sociedad (1)	0–1	0–1

=== Matches ===
12 February 2026
21:00

Atlético Madrid	4–0	Barcelona
E. García 6' (o.g.); Griezmann 14'; Lookman 33'; Alvarez 45+2'	Report

Metropolitano, Madrid
Attendance: 69,200
Referee: Juan Martínez Munuera
3 March 2026
21:00

Barcelona	3–0	Atlético Madrid
Bernal 29', 72'; Raphinha 45+5' (pen.)	Report

Camp Nou, Barcelona
Attendance: 45,398
Referee: Ricardo de Burgos Bengoetxea

Atlético Madrid won 4–3 on aggregate.

11 February 2026
21:00

Athletic Bilbao	0–1	Real Sociedad
	Report	Turrientes 62'

San Mamés, Bilbao
Attendance: 51,281
Referee: José María Sánchez Martínez
4 March 2026
21:00

Real Sociedad	1–0	Athletic Bilbao
Oyarzabal 87' (pen.)	Report

Anoeta, San Sebastián
Attendance: 38,738
Referee: César Soto Grado

Real Sociedad won 2–0 on aggregate.

== Final ==
18 April 2026
21:00 CEST

Atlético Madrid	2–2 (a.e.t.)	Real Sociedad
Lookman 18'; Alvarez 83'	Report	Barrenetxea 1'; Oyarzabal 45+1' (pen.)
Penalties
Sørloth (penalty missed); Alvarez (penalty missed); González (penalty scored); Almada (penalty scored); Baena (penalty scored)	3–4	(penalty scored) Soler; (penalty missed) Óskarsson; (penalty scored) Sučić; (penalty scored) Muñoz; (penalty scored) Marín

La Cartuja, Seville
Attendance: 70,000
Referee: Javier Alberola Rojas

== Top scorers ==
Rank	Player	Club	Goals
1	(Spain) Raúl García	Osasuna	7
2	(France) Antoine Griezmann	Atlético Madrid	5
2	(Spain) Rodrigo Riquelme	Real Betis	5
2	(Spain) Carlos Vicente	Alavés	5
5	(Spain) Abdón	Mallorca	4
5	(Spain) Jefté Betancor	Albacete	4
5	(Spain) Jan González	Atlètic Sant Just	4
5	(Spain) Juanmi	Getafe	4
5	(Spain) Toni Martínez	Alavés	4
10	(Spain) Juan Carlos Arana	Racing Santander	3
10	(Argentina) Gonzalo Di Renzo	Talavera de la Reina	3
10	(Spain) Cristian Herrera	Deportivo La Coruña	3
10	(Nigeria) Ademola Lookman	Atlético Madrid	3
10	(Dominican Republic) Mariano	Alavés	3
10	(Canada) Tani Oluwaseyi	Villarreal	3
10	(Spain) Mikel Oyarzabal	Real Sociedad	3
10	(Spain) Fran Pérez	Rayo Vallecano	3
10	(Nigeria) Umar Sadiq	Valencia	3
10	(Spain) Beñat Turrientes	Real Sociedad	3
