= Iván Martínez =

Iván Martínez may refer to:

- Iván Martínez (footballer, born 1983), Spanish footballer
- Iván Martínez (footballer, born 2005), Spanish footballer
- Iván Martínez Airport, Chilean airport
