= Sergio León =

Spanish footballer (born 1989)

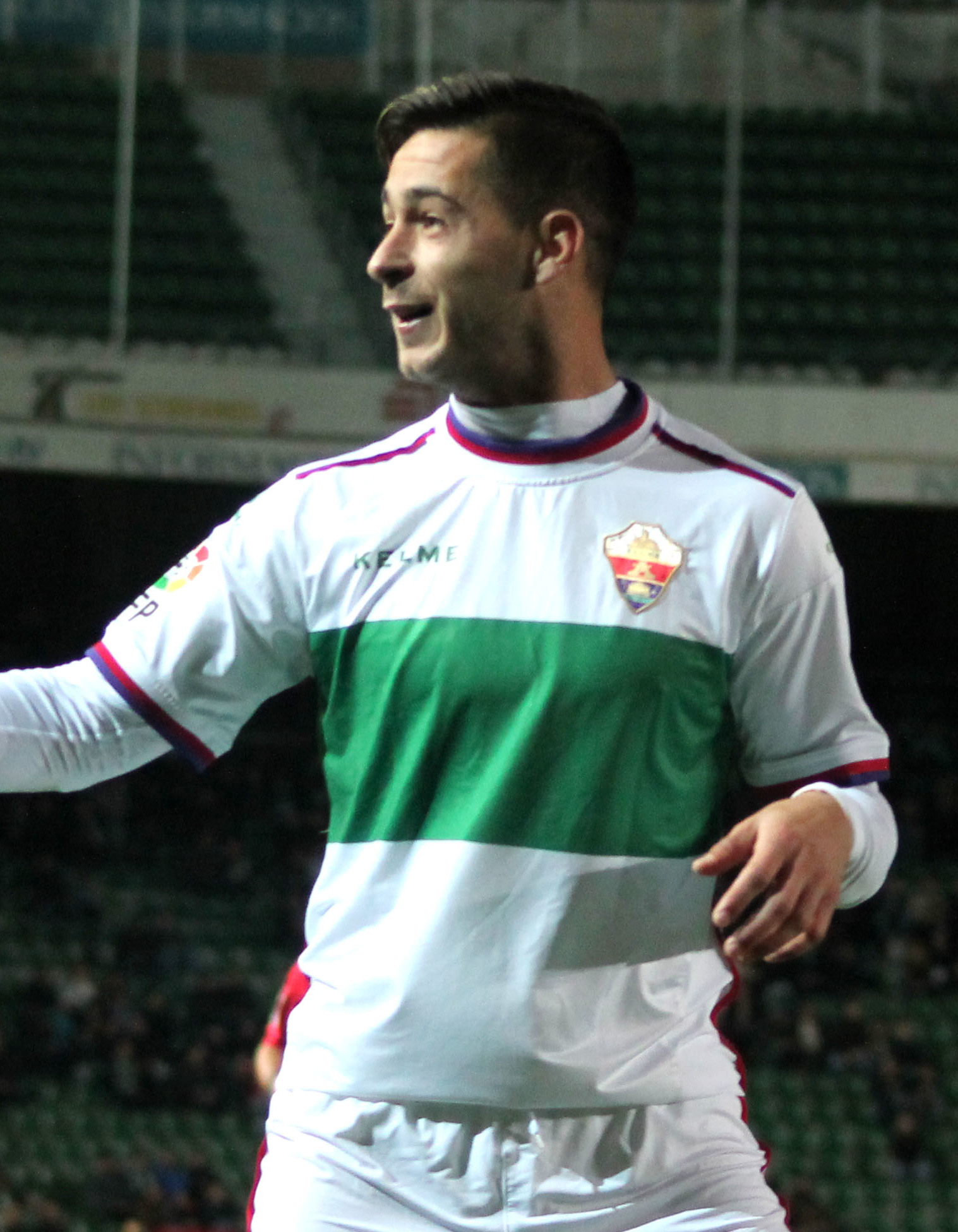
- León with Elche in 2016

Personal information
- Full name: Sergio León Limones
- Date of birth: 6 January 1989 (age 37)
- Place of birth: Palma del Río, Spain
- Height: 1.78 m (5 ft 10 in)
- Position: Forward

Team information
- Current team: Atlético Palma Río

Youth career
- 2004–2008: Betis

Senior career*
Years	Team	Apps	(Gls)
2008–2010	Betis C	31	(15)
2008–2009	→ Mairena (loan)	0	(0)
2009–2011	Betis B	15	(1)
2010	Betis	1	(0)
2011–2013	Reus	72	(29)
2013–2015	Elche B	26	(12)
2013	→ Murcia (loan)	2	(0)
2014–2015	→ Llagostera (loan)	35	(9)
2015–2016	Elche	41	(22)
2016–2017	Osasuna	33	(10)
2017–2019	Betis	47	(11)
2019–2021	Levante	50	(3)
2021–2023	Valladolid	64	(13)
2023–2024	Elche	12	(2)
2024	Eibar	15	(3)
2024–	Atlético Palma Río	60	(33)
- * Club domestic league appearances and goals as of 00:06, 9 November 2026 (UTC)

Sergio León Limones (Spanish pronunciation: [ˈseɾxjo leˈon]; born 6 January 1989) is a Spanish professional footballer who plays as a forward for División de Honor Andaluza club Atlético Palma del Río.

An academy graduate of Betis where he was mainly a reserve, he played more frequently at Reus before being signed by Elche in 2013. After finishing as top scorer in Segunda División three years later, he joined La Liga club Osasuna, where he also appeared for Betis, Levante and Valladolid to total 159 matches and 30 goals over six seasons.

== Club career ==
=== Betis and Reus ===
Born in Palma del Río, Córdoba, León joined Real Betis' youth ranks at the age of 15 and made his debut for the first team on 27 March 2010, playing 26 minutes in place of Juanma in a 1–0 Segunda División loss against Girona FC at the Manuel Ruiz de Lopera. It would be his only appearance of the campaign, as the Verdiblancos failed to regain their La Liga status.

In the 2011 January transfer window, after featuring rarely also for the reserves over the course of 1 1/2 seasons, León left Betis and signed for CF Reus Deportiu in the Tercera División. He scored five goals in 14 games until the end of the season, helping the Catalans return to Segunda División B after a five-year absence.

León netted 18 times during 2012–13's division three, including a hat-trick on 17 February 2013 in a 3–2 home win over Ontinyent CF.

=== Elche ===
In the summer of 2013, León joined Elche CF on a four-year deal, being assigned to their reserves and then loaned to Real Murcia CF. After only three competitive appearances for the latter he was recalled by his parent club, continuing to feature and score regularly for the B's.

On 12 July 2014, León was again loaned to a second-tier club, UE Llagostera, for the upcoming season. In the second matchday, he scored his first professional goal to open a 2–0 victory over CD Leganés at home for the team's first professional win. He eventually finished as top scorer for the Province of Girona side, who finished ninth.

León subsequently returned to Elche, and was promoted to the first team which had suffered top-flight relegation for financial reasons. He made his competitive debut for the Valencians on 23 August 2015 by playing the full 90 minutes as they opened their campaign with a 2–0 defeat at SD Ponferradina, and a week later scored his first goal to win a match 2–1 against Bilbao Athletic at the Estadio Martínez Valero. He was the Segunda División Player of the Month in September 2015, having contributed three goals and an assist, and eventually won the Pichichi Trophy for top scorer, netting his 22nd from the penalty spot in the final game against AD Alcorcón to overtake Córdoba CF's Florin Andone.

=== Osasuna ===
León signed a four-year contract with CA Osasuna on 24 August 2016, for an undisclosed fee. He made his debut in the top division three days later, replacing Oriol Riera in a 2–0 home loss against Real Sociedad. He scored his first goal in the competition on 22 September, to equalise in a 2–1 loss to RCD Espanyol again at the El Sadar Stadium.

On 17 October 2016, León scored a brace in a 3–2 away defeat of SD Eibar. He repeated the feat the next 9 April, in a 2–1 home victory against CD Leganés. He finished the season with a squad-best ten goals, but his team suffered relegation.

=== Return to Betis ===
On 1 June 2017, León returned to Betis after agreeing to a four-year deal, for a rumoured fee of €3.5 million. He was the club's top scorer with 11 goals as they qualified for the UEFA Europa League in his first season, though he played less frequently in the second half of the campaign following the promotion of Loren into the first team.

=== Levante ===
León joined Levante UD on a three-year contract on 12 June 2019. Mainly a substitute during his spell, he scored ten competitive goals in 59 matches, including five in the 2020–21 edition of the Copa del Rey.

=== Valladolid ===
On 31 August 2021, León signed a one-year contract with Real Valladolid. He scored seven goals in his debut campaign as the club achieved promotion to the top tier, adding six in his second and suffering immediate relegation.

=== Later career ===
On 1 September 2023, transfer deadline day, León returned to Elche on a one-year deal. On 25 January 2024, he signed for SD Eibar as a free agent. He scored on his debut the following day, in a 1–0 win over CD Mirandés.

León joined amateurs Atlético Palma del Río CF in his hometown in September 2024.

== Honours ==
Individual

- Pichichi Trophy (Segunda División): 2015–16
- Segunda División Player of the Month: September 2015
