= Joselu (footballer, born 2004) =

Spanish footballer (born 2004)

Personal information
- Full name: José Luis Pérez del Amo
- Date of birth: 12 March 2004 (age 22)
- Place of birth: Villalbilla, Spain
- Height: 1.83 m (6 ft 0 in)
- Position: Forward

Team information
- Current team: Getafe B
- Number: 9

Youth career
- Villalbilla
- Alcalá
- 2019–2022: Rayo Vallecano
- 2022–2023: Valencia

Senior career*
Years	Team	Apps	(Gls)
2021–2022	Rayo Vallecano B	35	(10)
2023–2025	Valencia B	57	(7)
2025–	Getafe B	27	(9)
2025–	Getafe	2	(0)
- * Club domestic league appearances and goals as of 7 May 2026

José Luis Pérez del Amo (born 12 March 2004), commonly known as Joselu, is a Spanish professional footballer who plays as a forward for Getafe CF B.

== Career ==
Born in Villalbilla, Madrid, Joselu represented Villalbilla CF, RSD Alcalá and Rayo Vallecano as a youth. He made his senior debut with the reserves during the 2021–22 season in the Tercera División RFEF, becoming the youngest goalscorer of the side in the decade in the process.

On 1 July 2022, Joselu signed for Valencia CF and returned to youth setup. He slowly began to appear with the B-team in Segunda Federación, before departing the club in 2025.

On 4 July 2025, Joselu moved to another reserve team, Getafe CF B also in the fourth division. He made his first team debut on 28 October, coming on as a second-half substitute for Coba da Costa and scoring his side's ninth in a 11–0 away routing of CF Inter de Valdemoro, for the campaign's Copa del Rey.

Joselu made his professional – and La Liga – debut on 2 January 2026, replacing Álex Sancris late into a 1–1 away draw against Rayo Vallecano.
