= Pedrito Juárez =

Argentine footballer (born 2014)

Personal information
- Full name: Pedro Juárez Monti
- Date of birth: 17 February 2014 (age 12)
- Place of birth: Salta Province, Argentina
- Position: Midfielder

Team information
- Current team: Barcelona

Youth career
- Years: Team
- –2021: Atlètic Sant Just
- 2021–: Barcelona

Pedro Juárez Monti (born 17 February 2014) is an Argentine footballer who plays as a midfielder for Barcelona.

== Early life ==
Juárez was born on 17 February 2014. The son of Gonzalo and Maria, he has a brother. Born in Salta Province, Argentina, he moved with his family to California, United States. Subsequently, he moved with his family to Barcelona, Spain in 2020.

Growing up, he regarded Argentina internationals Carlos Tevez, Juan Román Riquelme, and Lionel Messi as his football idols and supported Argentine side Gimnasia y Tiro.

== Career ==
As a youth player, Juárez joined the youth academy of Spanish side Atlètic Sant Just. Following his stint there, he joined the youth academy of Spanish La Liga side Barcelona in 2021.

== Style of play ==
Juárez plays as a midfielder. Known for his dribbling ability, he has received comparisons to Argentina international Lionel Messi.
