= Abdoulaye Keita =

Abdoulaye Keita may refer to:

- Abdoulaye Keita (Guinean footballer) (?–2019), Guinean football goalkeeper of the 1970s and '80s
- Abdoulaye Keita (footballer, born 1990), French football goalkeeper
- Abdoulaye Keita (footballer, born 1994), Malian football defensive midfielder
- Abdoulaye Keita (footballer, born 2002), Spanish football winger
- Abdoulaye Khouma Keita (born 1978), Senegalese football defender
