= Boston Billups =

Footballer

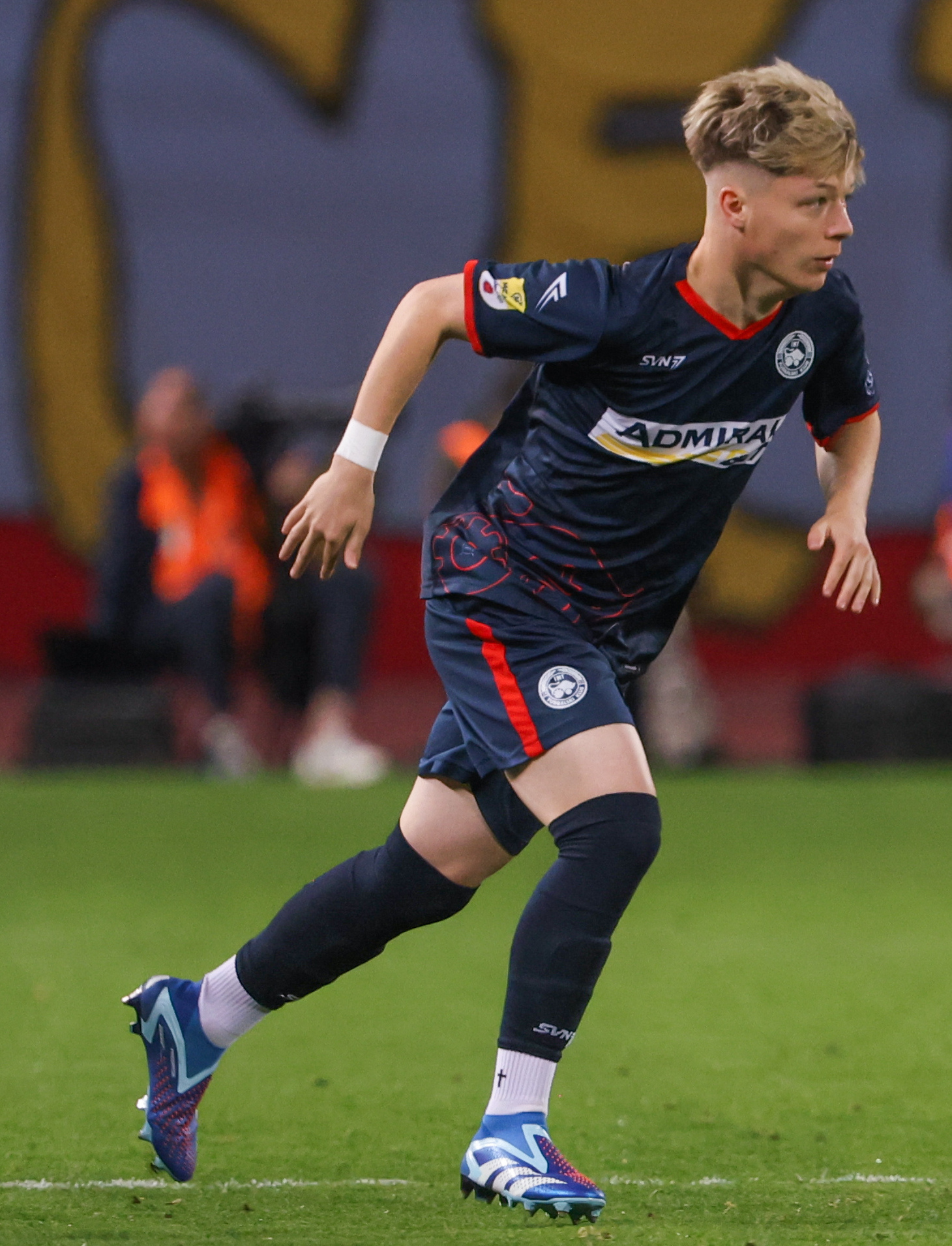
- Billups playing for IMT in 2024

Personal information
- Full name: Boston Billups
- Date of birth: 24 August 2005 (age 21)
- Place of birth: Clackamas, Oregon, U.S.
- Height: 1.70 m (5 ft 7 in)
- Position: Midfielder

Team information
- Current team: Cartagena (on loan from Eldense)

Youth career
- 2017–2019: Portland Timbers
- 2019–2020: Hospitalet
- 2020–2021: Atlètic Sant Just
- 2021–2022: Vic Riuprimer REFO
- 2022–2023: Red Star Belgrade
- 2023–2024: IMT

Senior career*
Years	Team	Apps	(Gls)
2024–2025	IMT	10	(0)
2025	Rayo Majadahonda	0	(0)
2025	Cartagena B	0	(0)
2025–	Eldense	8	(0)
2026–	→ Cartagena (loan)	0	(0)

International career^{‡}
2024	Malta U19	2	(0)
- * Club domestic league appearances and goals as of 10 June 2026 ‡ National team caps and goals as of 11 November 2024

Boston Billups (born 24 August 2005) is a professional footballer who plays as an attacking midfielder for Cartagena, on loan from Eldense. Born in the United States, he has represented Malta at the youth level.

== Early life ==
Billups was born on 24 August 2005 in Clackamas, Oregon, United States. From 2011 to 2019, he attended Catlin Gabel School in Portland. In 2019, Billups moved to Spain to attend the American School of Barcelona, completing his studies there in 2021. From 2022 to 2024, he continued his education at the International School of Belgrade, where he graduated with an IB Diploma. From 2024, he began a degree in Computer Science online at the University of Florida.

== Club career ==
=== Early career ===
Billups started his youth career with Portland Timbers, where he trained from 2017 to 2019, developing foundational skills in a competitive U.S. environment. In 2019, he moved to Spain, joining CE L'Hospitalet and later had brief stints with Atlètic Sant Just FC and Vic Riuprimer REFO FC. At Sant Just, Billups was part of a historic side that was promoted to División de Honor Cadete for the first time in the club's history. His experience in Spain was marked by adaptability during the challenges posed by the COVID-19 pandemic.

Billups joined Serbian club Red Star Belgrade in early 2022, where he continued his youth development at Serbia's most successful club until late 2023.

=== IMT ===
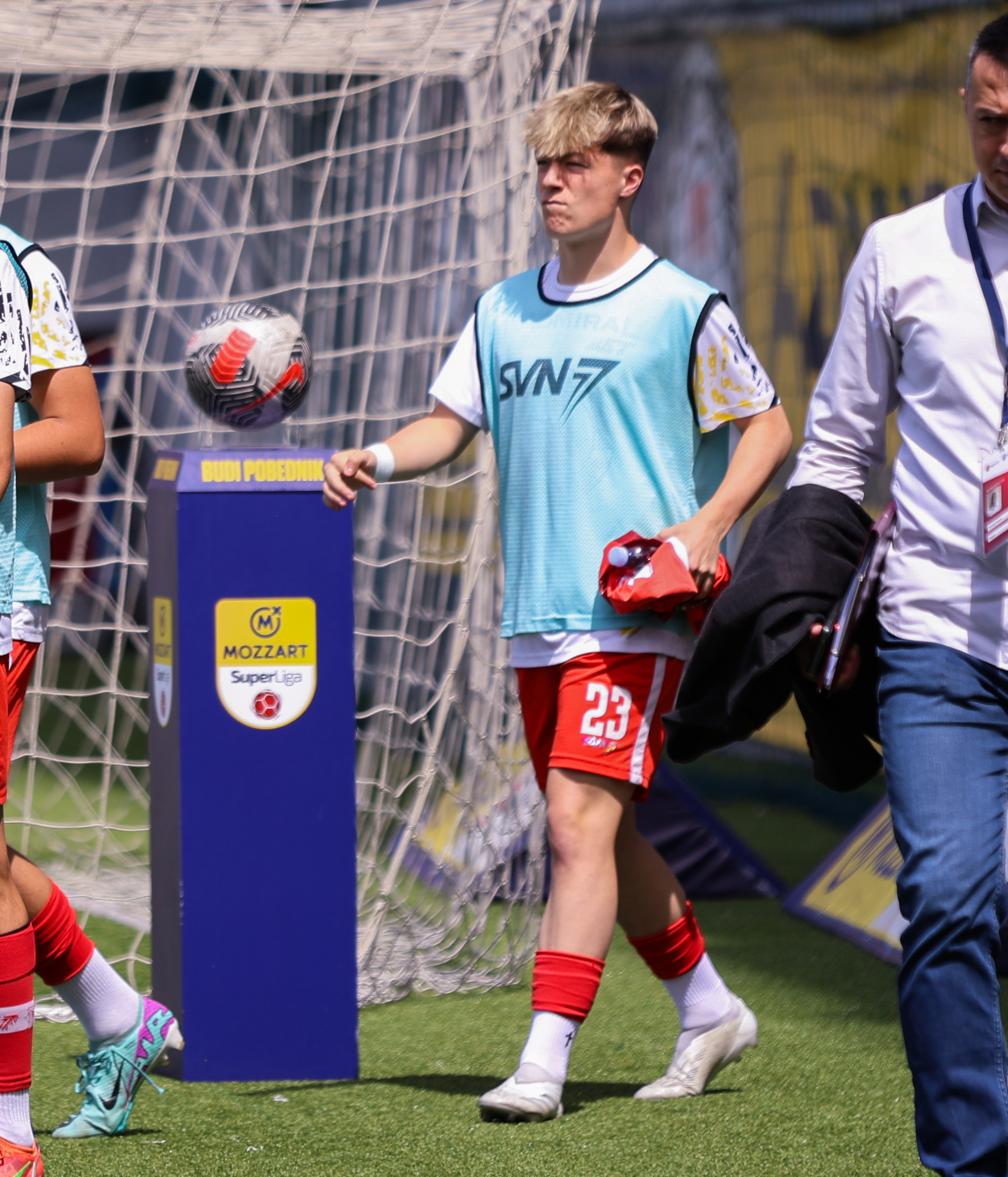
Billups with IMT in 2024

In October 2023, Billups transferred to FK IMT, contributing to their U19 National Championship (Omladinska liga Srbije 23/24) group and helping FK IMT qualify for its first-ever UEFA Youth League qualification. He made his professional debut for FK IMT in February 2024, in a match against FK TSC. He scored his first professional goal for FK IMT on 29 June of that year, in the 48th minute of a friendly match against FC Chernomorets Novorossiysk.

=== Rayo Majadahonda ===
In February 2025, Billups signed a contract with Spanish club CF Rayo Majadahonda. He only featured in one match for the club before leaving in July.

=== Cartagena ===
In August 2025, Billups signed a contract with Spanish club FC Cartagena's reserve team, FC Cartagena B. He spent the entire pre-season with the first team while impressing and playing in all six first team matches.

=== Eldense ===
In September 2025, Billups signed a contract with Spanish club CD Eldense. He received his first professional start in the Copa del Rey against Real Jaén on 29 October, also scoring his first professional goal in official competition during this match. Billups ended the season with 11 matches overall, as the club achieved promotion to Segunda División.

==== Return to Cartagena (loan) ====
On 22 July 2026, Billups returned to Cartagena on a one-year loan deal.

== International career ==
In 2024, Billups has represented Malta at the under-19 level, making two appearances for the side. He made his youth international debut in a 2–2 draw against the Albania under-19s on 22 March.

== Career statistics ==
As of 17 May 2026

Appearances and goals by club, season and competition
Club	Season	League			Cup		Other		Total	
Club	Season	Division	Apps	Goals	Apps	Goals	Apps	Goals	Apps	Goals
IMT	2023–24	Serbian SuperLiga	6	0	0	0	—		6	0
IMT	2024–25	Serbian SuperLiga	4	0	1	0	—		5	0
IMT	Total		10	0	1	0	—		11	0
Rayo Majadahonda	2024–25	Segunda Federación	0	0	—		1 (Note: Appearance in 2025 Segunda Federación play-offs)	0	1	0
Cartagena B	2025–26	Segunda Federación	0	0	—		—		0	0
Eldense	2025–26	Primera Federación	7	0	3	1	—		10	1
Career total			17	0	4	1	1	0	22	1
