= CF Campanario =

Association football team in Spain

Campanario
- Full name: Club de Fútbol Campanario
- Founded: 1924; 102 years ago
- Ground: Municipal, Campanario, Badajoz, Extremadura, Spain
- Capacity: 2,000
- President: Fernando Escudero
- Manager: Cano
- League: Primera Extremeña – Group 3
- 2025–26: Primera Extremeña – Group 3, 6th of 14
Home colours	Away colours

Club de Fútbol Campanario is a football team based in Campanario, Badajoz, in the autonomous community of Extremadura. The club play in Primera Extremeña – Group 3, holding home matches at the Estadio Municipal de Campanario, with a capacity of 2,000 people.

== History ==
=== Club background ===
- Club Deportivo Campanario (1924–1982)
- Club Polideportivo Campanario (1986–2010)
- Club de Fútbol Campanario (2010–)

== Season to season ==
Season	Tier	Division	Place	Copa del Rey
1971–72	5	2ª Reg.	11th	
1972–73	5	2ª Reg.	1st	
1973–74	5	2ª Reg.	3rd	
1974–75	5	1ª Reg.	1st	
1975–76	4	Reg. Pref.	20th	
1976–77	5	1ª Reg.	1st	
1977–78	5	Reg. Pref.	12th	
1978–79	5	Reg. Pref.	6th	
1979–80	5	Reg. Pref.	8th	
1980–81	5	Reg. Pref.	19th	
1981–82	6	1ª Reg.	16th	
1982–1986	DNP			
1986–87	6	1ª Reg.	7th	
1987–88	6	1ª Reg.	6th	
1988–89	6	1ª Reg.	6th	
1989–90	6	1ª Reg.	1st	
1990–91	5	Reg. Pref.	6th	
1991–92	5	Reg. Pref.	13th	
1992–93	5	Reg. Pref.	16th	
1993–94	5	Reg. Pref.	13th	

Season	Tier	Division	Place	Copa del Rey
1994–95	5	Reg. Pref.	7th	
1995–96	5	Reg. Pref.	10th	
1996–97	5	Reg. Pref.	18th	
1997–98	5	Reg. Pref.	11th	
1998–99	5	Reg. Pref.	17th	
1999–2000	5	Reg. Pref.	9th	
2000–01	5	Reg. Pref.	17th	
2001–02	5	Reg. Pref.	13th	
2002–03	5	Reg. Pref.	13th	
2003–04	5	Reg. Pref.	9th	
2004–05	5	Reg. Pref.	18th	
2005–06	6	1ª Reg.	11th	
2006–07	DNP			
2007–08	6	1ª Reg.	4th	
2008–09	6	1ª Reg.	3rd	
2009–10	5	Reg. Pref.	17th	
2010–11	5	Reg. Pref.	14th	
2011–12	5	Reg. Pref.	9th	
2012–13	5	Reg. Pref.	10th	
2013–14	5	Reg. Pref.	8th	

Season	Tier	Division	Place	Copa del Rey
2014–15	5	Reg. Pref.	11th	
2015–16	5	Reg. Pref.	9th	
2016–17	5	1ª Ext.	9th	
2017–18	5	1ª Ext.	7th	
2018–19	5	1ª Ext.	2nd	
2019–20	5	1ª Ext.	3rd	
2020–21	4	3ª	9th / 6th	
2021–22	6	1ª Ext.	1st	
2022–23	6	1ª Ext.	3rd	
2023–24	6	1ª Ext.	2nd	
2024–25	6	1ª Ext.	2nd	
2025–26	6	1ª Ext.		

- 1 season in Tercera División
