= Universitario (disambiguation) =

Universitario is Spanish for university student. It is the name of several football clubs, sports clubs, and stadiums in Latin America and Europe.

Universitario may refer to:

== Clubs ==
=== Football ===
- Club Universitario de Deportes, a Peruvian football club based in Lima
- Universitario de Sucre, a Bolivian football club based in Sucre
- Técnico Universitario, an Ecuadorian football club based in Ambato
- Universitario de Pando, a Bolivian football club based in Pando
- Universitario Popayán, a Colombian football club based in Popayán
- Universitario de La Paz, a Bolivian football club
- Universitario de Trujillo, a Peruvian football club based in Trujillo
- Juventud Unida Universitario, an Argentine football club based in San Luis
- Grupo Universitario de Tandil, an Argentine football club based in Tandil
- Universitario FC, a Spanish football club based in Las Palmas

=== Other sports ===
- Club Universitario de Buenos Aires, an Argentine sports club based in Buenos Aires known for its rugby union team
- Universitario Rugby Club de Tucumán, an Argentine rugby union club based in San Miguel de Tucumán
- Club Universitario de Córdoba, an Argentine sports club based in Córdoba known for its rugby union team
- Club Universitario de La Plata, an Argentine sports club based in La Plata known for its rugby union and field hockey teams
- Club Universitario de Rosario, an Argentine sports club based in Rosario known for its rugby union team
- Urunday Universitario, a Uruguayan sports club based in Prado, Montevideo known for its basketball team
- Centro Desportivo Universitário de Lisboa, a Portuguese university sports club based in Lisbon known for its rugby union team
- Centro Desportivo Universitário do Porto, a Portuguese university sports club based in Porto known for its rugby union team
- Círculo Universitario de Quilmes, an Argentine sports club based in Quilmes, Buenos Aires known for its rugby union and field hockey teams

== Stadiums ==
- Estadio Universitario, a stadium in Nuevo León, Mexico belonging to the Universidad Autónoma de Nuevo León and home of football club Tigres UANL
- Estadio Olímpico Universitario, an Olympic stadium in Mexico City belonging to the National Autonomous University of Mexico and home of Pumas UNAM
- Estadio Universitario Alberto Chivo Cordova, a stadium in Toluca, Mexico
- Estadio Universitario de Caracas, a baseball stadium in Caracas, Venezuela belonging to the Central University of Venezuela
- Estádio Universitário de Lisboa, a stadium in Lisbon, Portugal home of the Portugal national rugby union team
- Estadio Universitario Beto Ávila, a baseball stadium in Veracruz, Mexico
- Estadio Universitario UES, a multi-use stadium in San Salvador, El Salvador, home of Universidad de El Salvador
- Estádio Universitário São Paulo, a football stadium in São Paulo, Brazil, home of University of São Paulo's football team

== Other ==
- Clásico Universitario, a rivalry between Chilean football clubs Universidad de Chile and Universidad Católica

== See also ==
- Universitatea (disambiguation)
