= Universitatea =

Universitatea (English: University) may refer to:

- CS Universitatea Craiova, Romanian football club
- FC Universitatea Cluj, Romanian football club
- Universitatea Cluj, Romanian sports club (except football)

== See also ==
- Universitario (disambiguation)
- Universidad (disambiguation)
