= Manu Rodríguez (footballer) =

Spanish footballer (born 2005)

Personal information
- Full name: Manuel Rodríguez Paz
- Date of birth: 16 November 2005 (age 20)
- Place of birth: Catoira, Spain
- Height: 1.79 m (5 ft 10 in)
- Position: Midfielder

Team information
- Current team: Sporting Gijón
- Number: 36

Youth career
- Catoira
- 2013–2024: Celta

Senior career*
Years	Team	Apps	(Gls)
2024	Celta B	1	(0)
2024–2025	Sporting B	35	(1)
2025–	Sporting Gijón	27	(1)
- * Club domestic league appearances and goals as of 6 June 2026

Manuel Rodríguez Paz (born 16 November 2005) is a Spanish footballer who plays as a midfielder for Sporting de Gijón.

== Career ==
Born in Catoira, Pontevedra, A Coruña, Rodríguez joined RC Celta de Vigo's youth sides in 2013, from hometown side Catoira SD. He made his senior debut with the reserves on 11 May 2024, coming on as a late substitute for goalscorer Pablo Durán in a 3–0 Primera Federación home win over CF Rayo Majadahonda.

On 26 August 2024, Rodríguez left Celta after 11 years and joined Sporting de Gijón, being initially a member of the B-team in Tercera Federación. He scored his first senior goal on 18 May of the following year, netting the B's second in a 2–0 home win over CD Covadonga, for the first leg of the promotion play-offs quarterfinals.

Rodríguez made his first team debut on 29 October 2025, starting in a 1–0 away win over Caudal Deportivo, for the season's Copa del Rey. He made his professional debut four days later, coming on as a second-half substitute for Kevin Vázquez in a 0–0 Segunda División home draw against UD Las Palmas.

Rodríguez scored his first professional goal on 3 December 2025, netting Sporting's second in a 2–0 away win over CD Mirandés, also for the national cup. On 30 March of the following year, his contract was automatically renewed until 2030.
