= Universidad =

Universidad (Spanish for "university") may refer to:

== Places ==
- Universidad, San Juan, Puerto Rico
- Universidad (Madrid)

== Football clubs ==
- Universidad SC, a Guatemalan football club that represents the Universidad de San Carlos de Guatemala
- Universidad Católica, Chilean football club
- Universidad de Chile (football club), Chilean football club
- Club Universidad Nacional or UNAM Pumas, Mexican football club
- Universidad de Los Andes FC, Venezuelan football club
- Universidad San Carlos or USAC, Guatemalan football club
- Universidad de Santa Cruz Bolivian football Club currently playing Bolivian Football Regional Leagues
- Universidad Independiente, a former club based in San Pedro Sula, Honduras, dissolved in 2010

== See also ==
- Universidad station (disambiguation)
- Universitatea (disambiguation)
