= Atlético Palma del Río CF =

Spanish football team

Atlético Palma del Río
- Full name: Atlético Palma del Río Club de Fútbol
- Founded: 1977
- Ground: Sergio León, Palma del Río, Andalusia, Spain
- Capacity: 1,500
- President: Pedro Pablo González
- Manager: Fran Sedano
- League: División de Honor – Group 1
- 2025–26: División de Honor – Group 1, 5th of 16
Home colours	Away colours

Atlético Palma del Río Club de Fútbol is a Spanish football team based in Palma del Río, in the autonomous community of Andalusia. Founded in 1977, they play in División de Honor – Group 1, holding home matches at Estadio Sergio León, with a capacity of 1,500 people.

== Season to season ==
Season	Tier	Division	Place	Copa del Rey
1977–1980	—	Regional	—	
1980–81	7	2ª Reg.	1st	
1981–82	6	1ª Reg.	7th	
1982–83	6	1ª Reg.	4th	
1983–84	5	Reg. Pref.	1st	
1984–85	4	3ª	18th	
1985–86	4	3ª	10th	
1986–87	4	3ª	12th	
1987–88	4	3ª	3rd	
1988–89	4	3ª	10th	
1989–90	4	3ª	13th	
1990–91	4	3ª	4th	
1991–92	4	3ª	18th	
1992–93	5	Reg. Pref.	5th	
1993–94	6	1ª Reg.		
1994–95	6	1ª Reg.		
1995–96	6	1ª Reg.		
1996–97	6	1ª Reg.		
1997–98	6	1ª Reg.		
1998–99	5	Reg. Pref.	10th	

Season	Tier	Division	Place	Copa del Rey
1999–2000	5	Reg. Pref.	6th	
2000–01	5	Reg. Pref.	11th	
2001–02	5	Reg. Pref.	10th	
2002–03	5	Reg. Pref.	15th	
2003–04	5	Reg. Pref.	11th	
2004–05	6	Reg. Pref.	2nd	
2005–06	5	1ª And.	16th	
2006–07	6	Reg. Pref.	11th	
2007–08	6	Reg. Pref.	12th	
2008–09	6	Reg. Pref.	12th	
2009–10	6	Reg. Pref.	8th	
2010–11	6	Reg. Pref.	6th	
2011–12	6	Reg. Pref.	1st	
2012–13	5	1ª And.	12th	
2013–14	5	1ª And.	18th	
2014–15	6	2ª And.	13th	
2015–16	7	3ª And.	9th	
2016–17	7	2ª And.	1st	
2017–18	6	1ª And.	5th	
2018–19	6	1ª And.	6th	

Season	Tier	Division	Place	Copa del Rey
2019–20	6	1ª And.	4th	
2020–21	6	1ª And.	2nd	
2021–22	7	1ª And.	2nd	
2022–23	6	Div. Hon.	13th	
2023–24	7	1ª And.	1st	
2024–25	6	Div. Hon.	4th	
2025–26	6	Div. Hon.	5th	First round
2026–27	6	Div. Hon.		

- 8 seasons in Tercera División
