= CD Yuncos =

Association football club in Spain

Yuncos
- Full name: Club Deportivo Yuncos
- Founded: 1964
- Ground: Complejo Deportivo Villa de Yuncos, Yuncos, Castile-La Mancha, Spain
- Capacity: 1,000
- President: José Ignacio Barales
- Manager: Juan Luis Mora
- League: Primera Autonómica Preferente – Group 2
- 2024–25: Primera Autonómica Preferente – Group 2, 3rd of 18
Home colours	Away colours

Club Deportivo Yuncos is a Spanish football team based in Yuncos, Toledo, in the autonomous community of Castile-La Mancha. Founded in 1964 it plays in Primera Autonómica Preferente – Group 2, holding home games at Complejo Deportivo Villa de Yuncos, which holds 1,000 spectators.

== Season to season ==
Season	Tier	Division	Place	Copa del Rey
1965–66	6	3ª Reg.	9th	
1966–67	6	3ª Reg.	8th	
1967–68	6	3ª Reg.	12th	
1968–69	6	3ª Reg.	6th	
1969–70	7	3ª Reg.	7th	
1970–71	7	3ª Reg.	11th	
1971–72	7	3ª Reg.	3rd	
1972–73	7	3ª Reg.	3rd	
1973–74	8	3ª Reg.	5th	
1974–75	8	3ª Reg.	4th	
1975–76	7	3ª Reg. P.	14th	
1976–77	7	3ª Reg. P.	15th	
1977–78	8	3ª Reg. P.	(R)	
1978–79	9	3ª Reg.	14th	
1979–80	9	3ª Reg.	14th	
1980–81	9	3ª Reg.	12th	
1981–82	9	3ª Reg.	12th	
1982–83	9	3ª Reg.	6th	
1983–84	9	3ª Reg.	7th	
1984–85	9	3ª Reg.	1st	

Season	Tier	Division	Place	Copa del Rey
1985–86	8	3ª Reg. P.	1st	
1986–87	6	1ª Reg.	3rd	
1987–88	6	1ª Reg.	1st	
1988–89	5	Reg. Pref.	12th	
1989–90	5	Reg. Pref.	6th	
1990–91	5	Reg. Pref.	5th	
1991–92	5	Reg. Pref.	12th	
1992–93	6	1ª Reg.	2nd	
1993–94	5	Reg. Pref.	5th	
1994–95	4	3ª	17th	
1995–96	5	1ª Aut.	7th	
1996–97	5	1ª Aut.	3rd	
1997–98	5	1ª Aut.	7th	
1998–99	DNP			
1999–2000	6	2ª Aut.	4th	
2000–01	6	2ª Aut.	2nd	
2001–02	6	2ª Aut.	9th	
2002–03	6	2ª Aut.	2nd	
2003–04	6	2ª Aut.	1st	
2004–05	5	1ª Aut.	18th	

Season	Tier	Division	Place	Copa del Rey
2005–06	6	2ª Aut.	2nd	
2006–07	6	2ª Aut.	2nd	
2007–08	6	1ª Aut.	3rd	
2008–09	5	Aut. Pref.	14th	
2009–10	5	Aut. Pref.	7th	
2010–11	5	Aut. Pref.	5th	
2011–12	5	Aut. Pref.	6th	
2012–13	5	Aut. Pref.	13th	
2013–14	5	Aut. Pref.	9th	
2014–15	5	Aut. Pref.	11th	
2015–16	5	Aut. Pref.	1st	
2016–17	4	3ª	20th	
2017–18	5	Aut. Pref.	5th	
2018–19	5	Aut. Pref.	4th	
2019–20	5	Aut. Pref.	7th	
2020–21	5	Aut. Pref.	3rd	
2021–22	6	Aut. Pref.	6th	
2022–23	6	Aut. Pref.	11th	
2023–24	6	Aut. Pref.	6th	
2024–25	6	Aut. Pref.	3rd	

Season	Tier	Division	Place	Copa del Rey
2025–26	6	Aut. Pref.		First round

- 2 seasons in Tercera División
