= Pedro Rómoli =

Argentine footballer

Personal information
- Full name: Pedro Román Rómoli
- Date of birth: 16 July 1971 (age 55)
- Place of birth: Arteaga, Argentina
- Position: Goalkeeper

Youth career
- Argentinos Juniors

Senior career*
Years	Team	Apps	(Gls)
1994–1995	Huracán	6	(0)
1995–1998	Lanús	8	(0)
–	San Miguel		
2000–2001	Huracán (TA)		
2002	Granada	16	(0)
2002	Huracán (TA)		
2002–2006	Motril	17	(0)
2007–2009	Maracena		
- * Club domestic league appearances and goals

Pedro Rómoli (born 16 July 1971) is an Argentine former footballer who played as a goalkeeper.

== Club career ==
Rómoli previously played for Huracán and Lanús in the Primera División Argentina. In January 2002, he joined Granada of the Spanish Segunda División B. Granada re-signed Rómoli in July 2002.
