= CD Sant Jordi =

Sant Jordi
- Full name: Club Deportivo Sant Jordi
- Founded: 1974
- Ground: Municipal de Sant Jordi, Sant Jordi, Palma de Mallorca, Balearic Islands, Spain
- Capacity: 1,500
- President: Jaime Gelabert Garau
- Manager: Iván Oliver
- League: División de Honor – Mallorca
- 2024–25: División de Honor – Mallorca, 2nd of 18
Home colours	Away colours

Club Deportivo Sant Jordi is a Spanish football team based in the town of Sant Jordi, in the municipality of Palma de Mallorca, in the autonomous community of the Balearic Islands. Founded in 1974, they play in División de Honor – Mallorca, holding home matches at Estadi Municipal de Sant Jordi, with a capacity of 1,500 people.

== Season to season ==
Season	Tier	Division	Place	Copa del Rey
1975–76	7	3ª Reg.	1st	
1976–77	6	2ª Reg.	10th	
1977–78	7	2ª Reg.	12th	
1978–79	7	2ª Reg.	6th	
1979–80	6	1ª Reg.	13th	
1980–81	6	1ª Reg.	12th	
1981–82	6	1ª Reg.	5th	
1982–83	6	1ª Reg.	12th	
1983–84	6	1ª Reg.	7th	
1984–85	6	1ª Reg.	9th	
1985–86	6	1ª Reg.	9th	
1986–87	6	1ª Reg.	10th	
1987–88	6	1ª Reg.	13th	
1988–89	6	1ª Reg.	15th	
1989–90	7	2ª Reg.	3rd	
1990–91	6	1ª Reg.	11th	
1991–92	6	1ª Reg.	17th	
1992–93	7	2ª Reg.	8th	
1993–94	7	2ª Reg.	2nd	
1994–95	6	1ª Reg.	11th	

Season	Tier	Division	Place	Copa del Rey
1995–96	6	1ª Reg.	17th	
1996–97	7	2ª Reg.	14th	
1997–98	7	2ª Reg.	17th	
1998–99	8	3ª Reg.	4th	
1999–2000	7	2ª Reg.	8th	
2000–01	7	2ª Reg.	12th	
2001–02	7	2ª Reg.	4th	
2002–03	7	2ª Reg.	7th	
2003–04	7	2ª Reg.	17th	
2004–05	8	3ª Reg.	5th	
2005–06	8	3ª Reg.	3rd	
2006–07	7	2ª Reg.	15th	
2007–08	7	2ª Reg.	15th	
2008–09	7	2ª Reg.	11th	
2009–10	7	2ª Reg.	9th	
2010–11	7	2ª Reg.	18th	
2011–12	7	2ª Reg.	2nd	
2012–13	6	1ª Reg.	16th	
2013–14	6	1ª Reg.	8th	
2014–15	6	1ª Reg.	17th	

Season	Tier	Division	Place	Copa del Rey
2015–16	6	1ª Reg.	4th	
2016–17	6	1ª Reg.	2nd	
2017–18	5	Reg. Pref.	3rd	
2018–19	5	Reg. Pref.	17th	
2019–20	5	Reg. Pref.	6th	
2020–21	5	Reg. Pref.	2nd	
2021–22	6	Reg. Pref.	3rd	
2022–23	5	3ª Fed.	16th	
2023–24	6	Reg. Pref.	4th	
2024–25	6	Div. Hon.	2nd	
2025–26	6	Div. Hon.		First round

- 1 season in Tercera Federación
