= Abdoulaye Keita (footballer, born 2002) =

Spanish footballer

Personal information
- Full name: Abdoulaye Keita Keita
- Date of birth: 1 September 2002 (age 24)
- Place of birth: Toledo, Spain
- Height: 1.86 m (6 ft 1 in)
- Position: Winger

Team information
- Current team: AVS
- Number: 10

Youth career
- Yuncos
- 2010–2017: Getafe
- 2017–2021: Atlético Pinto

Senior career*
Years	Team	Apps	(Gls)
2020–2021	Atlético Pinto	2	(0)
2021–2022	Alcorcón B	29	(6)
2021–2022	Alcorcón	0	(0)
2022–2025	Getafe B	80	(15)
2024–2025	Getafe	3	(0)
2025–2026	Ponferradina	36	(2)
2026–	AVS	5	(1)
- * Club domestic league appearances and goals as of 13 September 2026

Abdoulaye Keita Keita (born 1 September 2002) is a Spanish footballer who plays as a right winger for Liga Portugal 2 club AVS.

== Club career ==
Born in Toledo, Castilla–La Mancha, Keita represented CD Yuncos, Getafe CF and CA Pinto as a youth. On 23 February 2020, aged just 17, he made his senior debut by coming on as a first-half substitute in a 1–2 Tercera División home loss against CF Pozuelo de Alarcón.

In July 2021, after finishing his formation, Keita moved to AD Alcorcón and was assigned to the reserves in the Tercera División RFEF. He scored his first senior goal on 3 October, netting the game's only in a 1–0 away success over Villaverde San Andrés.

Keita made his first team debut for Alkor on 15 December 2021, replacing Hugo Fraile at half-time in a 1–2 extra-time away loss against Sporting de Gijón in the season's Copa del Rey. The following July, he moved to Getafe CF and was initially assigned to the B-team also in the fifth division.

Keita made his La Liga debut with Geta on 25 September 2024, replacing Álex Sola in a 1–0 away loss to FC Barcelona.
