= Iván Martínez (footballer, born 2005) =

Spanish footballer

Personal information
- Full name: Iván Martínez Ruiz
- Date of birth: 8 March 2005 (age 21)
- Place of birth: Granada, Spain
- Height: 1.87 m (6 ft 2 in)
- Position: Centre-back

Team information
- Current team: Burgos
- Number: 36

Youth career
- 2011–2014: Maracena
- 2014–2019: Granada
- 2019–2023: Maracena

Senior career*
Years	Team	Apps	(Gls)
2022–2023	Maracena B	4	(0)
2022–2024	Maracena	33	(2)
2024–	Burgos B	55	(4)
2025–	Burgos	0	(0)
- * Club domestic league appearances and goals as of 14 May 2026

Iván Martínez Ruiz (born 8 March 2005) is a Spanish footballer who plays as an attacking midfielder for Burgos CF.

== Career ==
Born in Granada, Andalusia, Martínez began his career with UD Maracena before moving to Granada CF's youth sides in 2014. After leaving the club in 2019, he returned to Maracena, making his first team debut in 2022, in the División de Honor Andaluza.

After starting the 2023–24 season with the Juvenil squad, Martínez became a starter for the main squad in Tercera Federación. On 30 July 2024, he signed for Burgos CF and was initially assigned to the reserves also in the fifth division.

Martínez made his first team debut with the Blanquinegros on 28 October 2025, starting and scoring a last-minute equalizer in a 2–1 extra-time away win over Atlético Tordesillas, for the season's Copa del Rey. He made his professional debut on 4 December, playing the full 90 minutes of a 1–0 away win over Real Zaragoza.
