= Aymane Jelbat =

Moroccan footballer (born 2000)

Personal information
- Date of birth: 27 May 2000 (age 26)
- Place of birth: Casablanca, Morocco
- Height: 1.84 m (6 ft 0 in)
- Position: Defender

Team information
- Current team: Ponferradina
- Number: 12

Youth career
- Raja CA
- AMF
- Eibar

Senior career*
Years	Team	Apps	(Gls)
2019–2020	Vitoria		
2020–2021	Amurrio	16	(1)
2022	San Ignacio	9	(0)
2022–2023	Barakaldo	19	(1)
2023–2024	Athletic Bilbao B	17	(2)
2024–2025	Barakaldo	23	(2)
2025–2026	Ourense	35	(1)
2026–	Ponferradina	0	(0)
- * Club domestic league appearances and goals as of 05:14, 7 July 2026 (UTC)

Aymane Jelbat (Arabic: أيمن جلباط; born 27 May 2000) is a Moroccan footballer who plays as a defender for Spanish Primera Federación club Ponferradina.

== Early life ==
Jelbat was born on 27 May 2000 Casablanca, Morocco.

== Career ==
In 2023, Jelbat signed for Spanish side Athletic Bilbao B. In 2024, he returned to Spanish side Barakaldo. In 2025, he joined Ourense with whom he played 35 matches in Primera Federación. On 6 July 2026, he was announced as a new player for Ponferradina of the Primera Federación.

== Style of play ==
Jelbat mainly operates as a defender. He is left-footed.
