= Villalbilla =

Coordinates: 40°26′2″N 3°17′56″W

- Flag Coat of arms

- Location in Spain.
- Country: Spain
- Autonomous community: Madrid

Area
  - Total: 34.6 km^{2} (13.4 sq mi)
- Elevation: 747 m (2,451 ft)

Population (2025-01-01)
  - Total: 18,687
  - Density: 540/km^{2} (1,400/sq mi)
- Time zone: UTC+1 (CET)
  - Summer (DST): UTC+2 (CEST)
- Website: www.ayto-villalbilla.org

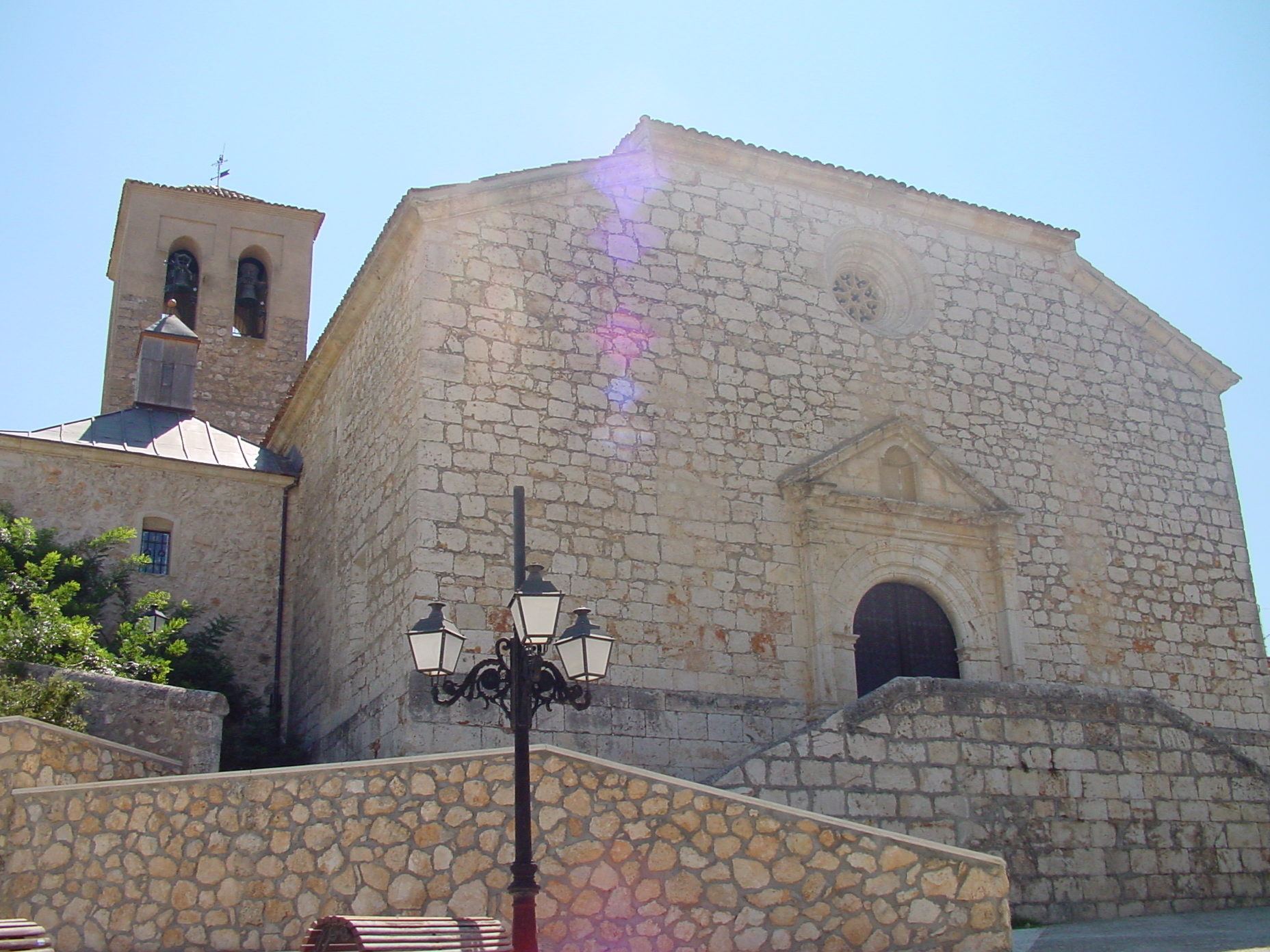
Church in Villalbilla

Villalbilla (Spanish pronunciation: [biʎalˈβiʎa]) is a village in Spain. It is located in the east of the Community of Madrid, near the city of Alcalá de Henares. It had a population of 15,866 in 2022.
