= UD Maracena =

Association football club in Spain

Maracena
- Full name: Unión Deportiva Maracena
- Founded: 1945
- Ground: Ciudad Deportiva de Maracena; Maracena, Spain
- Capacity: 2,500
- Chairman: (Spain) Juan Ramírez
- Manager: (Spain) Roberto Cuerva
- League: División de Honor – Group 2
- 2025–26: División de Honor – Group 2, 6th of 16
Home colours	Away colours

Unión Deportiva Maracena is a Spanish football team based in Maracena, in the autonomous community of Andalusia. Founded in 1945, it currently plays in División de Honor – Group 2, holding home matches at Ciudad Deportiva de Maracena, with a 2,000-seat capacity.

== Season to season ==
Season	Tier	Division	Place	Copa del Rey
1967–68	5	2ª Reg.	2nd	
1968–69	4	1ª Reg.	6th	
1969–70	4	1ª Reg.	16th	
1970–71	5	2ª Reg.	5th	
1971–72	5	2ª Reg.	1st	
1972–73	5	2ª Reg.	4th	
1973–74	5	2ª Reg.	2nd	
1974–75	5	2ª Reg.	1st	
1975–76	5	1ª Reg.	20th	
1976–77	6	2ª Reg.	3rd	
1977–78	6	1ª Reg.	9th	
1978–79	6	1ª Reg.	16th	
1979–80	6	1ª Reg.	16th	
1980–81	5	Reg. Pref.	10th	
1981–82	5	Reg. Pref.	5th	
1982–83	6	1ª Reg.	4th	
1983–84	5	Reg. Pref.	9th	
1984–85	5	Reg. Pref.	5th	
1985–86	5	Reg. Pref.	2nd	
1986–87	5	Reg. Pref.	4th	

Season	Tier	Division	Place	Copa del Rey
1987–88	5	Reg. Pref.	2nd	
1988–89	5	Reg. Pref.	2nd	
1989–90	4	3ª	11th	
1990–91	4	3ª	10th	
1991–92	4	3ª	13th	
1992–93	4	3ª	10th	
1993–94	4	3ª	7th	
1994–95	4	3ª	3rd	
1995–96	4	3ª	2nd	
1996–97	4	3ª	2nd	
1997–98	4	3ª	12th	
1998–99	4	3ª	4th	
1999–2000	4	3ª	3rd	
2000–01	4	3ª	5th	
2001–02	4	3ª	20th	
2002–03	5	Reg. Pref.	2nd	
2003–04	5	Reg. Pref.	1st	
2004–05	4	3ª	12th	
2005–06	4	3ª	14th	
2006–07	4	3ª	20th	

Season	Tier	Division	Place	Copa del Rey
2007–08	5	1ª And.	16th	
2008–09	5	1ª And.	10th	
2009–10	5	1ª And.	1st	
2010–11	4	3ª	6th	
2011–12	4	3ª	4th	
2012–13	4	3ª	10th	
2013–14	4	3ª	11th	
2014–15	4	3ª	8th	
2015–16	4	3ª	16th	
2016–17	4	3ª	13th	
2017–18	4	3ª	20th	
2018–19	5	Div. Hon.	2nd	
2019–20	4	3ª	14th	
2020–21	4	3ª	11th / 7th	
2021–22	6	Div. Hon.	2nd	
2022–23	5	3ª Fed.	13th	
2023–24	5	3ª Fed.	16th	
2024–25	6	Div. Hon.	7th	
2025–26	6	Div. Hon.	6th	First round
2026–27	6	Div. Hon.		Preliminary

- 26 seasons in Tercera División
- 2 seasons in Tercera Federación

== Former players ==
- (Argentina) Pedro Rómoli
- (Spain) Enrique
