= CF Inter de Valdemoro =

Spanish football team

Inter de Valdemoro
- Full name: Club de Fútbol Inter de Valdemoro
- Nickname: Naranjos
- Founded: 1983; 43 years ago
- Ground: El restón, Valdemoro, Madrid, Spain
- Capacity: 1,500
- President: Casildo Portugués
- Manager: Álvaro Plata
- League: Primera Autonómica de Aficionados – Group 2
- 2025–26: Primera Autonómica de Aficionados – Group 2, 13th of 18
| Home colours | Away colours |

Club de Fútbol Inter de Valdemoro is a Spanish football team based in Valdemoro, in the Community of Madrid. Founded in 1983, they play in Primera Autonómica de Aficionados – Group 2, holding home matches at Campo de Fútbol Abogados de Atocha, with a capacity of 1,500 people.

== Season to season ==
| Season | Tier | Division | Place | Copa del Rey |
|---|---|---|---|---|
| 1991–92 | 8 | 3ª Reg. | 1st | |
| 1992–93 | 7 | 2ª Reg. | 8th | |
| 1993–94 | 7 | 2ª Reg. | 16th | |
| 1994–95 | 8 | 3ª Reg. | 3rd | |
| 1995–96 | 7 | 2ª Reg. | 11th | |
| 1996–97 | 7 | 2ª Reg. | 4th | |
| 1997–98 | 7 | 2ª Reg. | 2nd | |
| 1998–99 | 6 | 1ª Reg. | 9th | |
| 1999–2000 | 6 | 1ª Reg. | 17th | |
| 2000–01 | 7 | 2ª Reg. | 6th | |
| 2001–02 | 7 | 2ª Reg. | 3rd | |
| 2002–03 | 7 | 2ª Reg. | 1st | |
| 2003–04 | 6 | 1ª Reg. | 13th | |
| 2004–05 | 6 | 1ª Reg. | 5th | |
| 2005–06 | 6 | 1ª Reg. | 6th | |
| 2006–07 | 6 | 1ª Reg. | 14th | |
| 2007–08 | 6 | 1ª Reg. | 13th | |
| 2008–09 | 6 | 1ª Reg. | 4th | |
| 2009–10 | 6 | 1ª Afic. | 12th | |
| 2010–11 | 6 | 1ª Afic. | 12th | |

| Season | Tier | Division | Place | Copa del Rey |
|---|---|---|---|---|
| 2011–12 | 6 | 1ª Afic. | 6th | |
| 2012–13 | 6 | 1ª Afic. | 3rd | |
| 2013–14 | 6 | 1ª Afic. | 18th | |
| 2014–15 | 7 | 2ª Afic. | 5th | |
| 2015–16 | 7 | 2ª Afic. | 4th | |
| 2016–17 | 7 | 2ª Afic. | 3rd | |
| 2017–18 | 6 | 1ª Afic. | 14th | |
| 2018–19 | 6 | 1ª Afic. | 7th | |
| 2019–20 | 6 | 1ª Afic. | 10th | |
| 2020–21 | 6 | 1ª Afic. | 1st | |
| 2021–22 | 6 | Pref. | 17th | |
| 2022–23 | 7 | 1ª Afic. | 9th | |
| 2023–24 | 7 | 1ª Afic. | 2nd | |
| 2024–25 | 6 | 1ª Aut. | 7th | |
| 2025–26 | 6 | 1ª Aut. | | First round |
