= Amadou Coundoul =

Senegalese footballer (born 2002)

Personal information
- Full name: Amadou Matar Coundoul
- Date of birth: 19 May 2002 (age 24)
- Place of birth: Guédiawaye, Senegal
- Height: 1.94 m (6 ft 4 in)
- Position: Forward

Team information
- Current team: Académica (on loan from Sporting Gijón)
- Number: 92

Youth career
- Diambars
- 2020–2021: Raíces

Senior career*
Years	Team	Apps	(Gls)
2021–2024	Llanera	64	(36)
2023	→ Montijo (loan)	11	(0)
2024–2025	Sporting B	32	(16)
2025–	Sporting Gijón	15	(1)
2026–	→ Académica (loan)	3	(1)

International career
2019	Senegal U17	1	(0)
- * Club domestic league appearances and goals as of 11 September 2026

Amadou Matar Coundoul (born 19 May 2002) is a Senegalese footballer who plays as a forward for Liga Portugal 2 club Académica de Coimbra on loan from Spanish club Sporting de Gijón.

== Club career ==
Born in Guédiawaye, Coundoul played for local side Diambars FC before being brought to Spain in 2020, where he played for CD Raíces as a youth. In 2021, he joined Segunda División RFEF side UD Llanera.

On 12 January 2023, after suffering relegation with Llanera, Coundoul was loaned to UD Montijo in the fourth tier, until June. Back to his parent club in July, he scored 30 goals in just 34 matches during the 2023–24 season, and moved to Sporting de Gijón on 29 June 2024, being initially assigned to the reserves also in the fifth division.

Coundoul was the top scorer of Sporting Atlético during the 2024–25 campaign with 17 goals, and was called up to the first team in July 2025 for pre-season. On 12 August of that year, he signed a professional one-year contract with the main squad, with an option for a further three years.

Coundoul made his professional debut on 23 August 2025, coming on as a late substitute for Juan Otero in a 1–0 Segunda División away win over AD Ceuta FC. On 29 July of the following year, after being sparingly used, he was loaned to Liga Portugal 2 side Académica de Coimbra for one year, with a buyout clause.

== International career ==
In 2019, Coundoul was called up to the Senegal national under-17 team.
