= Iván Martínez Airport =

Airport in Chile

- IATA: none; ICAO: SCIT

Summary
- Airport type: Private
- Serves: Isla Tierra del Fuego
- Elevation AMSL: 144 ft (44 m)
- Coordinates: 52°58′05″S 70°01′00″W

Map
- Location of Iván Martínez Airport in Chile

Runways
| Direction | Length | | Surface |
| Direction | m | ft | Surface |
|---|---|---|---|
| 08/26 | 605 | 1,985 | Gravel |
- Source: GCM Bing Maps

Iván Martínez Airport (ICAO: SCIT) is an airstrip serving the settlement of Estancia, 62 kilometres (39 mi) east-northeast of Punta Arenas in the Magallanes y Antártica Chilena Region of Chile. The airstrip is on the main island of Tierra del Fuego, 6 kilometres (3.7 mi) inland from the Gente Grande Bay (sv) off the Strait of Magellan.

The Punta Arenas VOR-DME (Ident: NAS) is 29.8 nautical miles (55.2 km) west of the airstrip.

== See also ==
- Transport in Chile
- List of airports in Chile
