= Álex Lizancos =

Spanish footballer

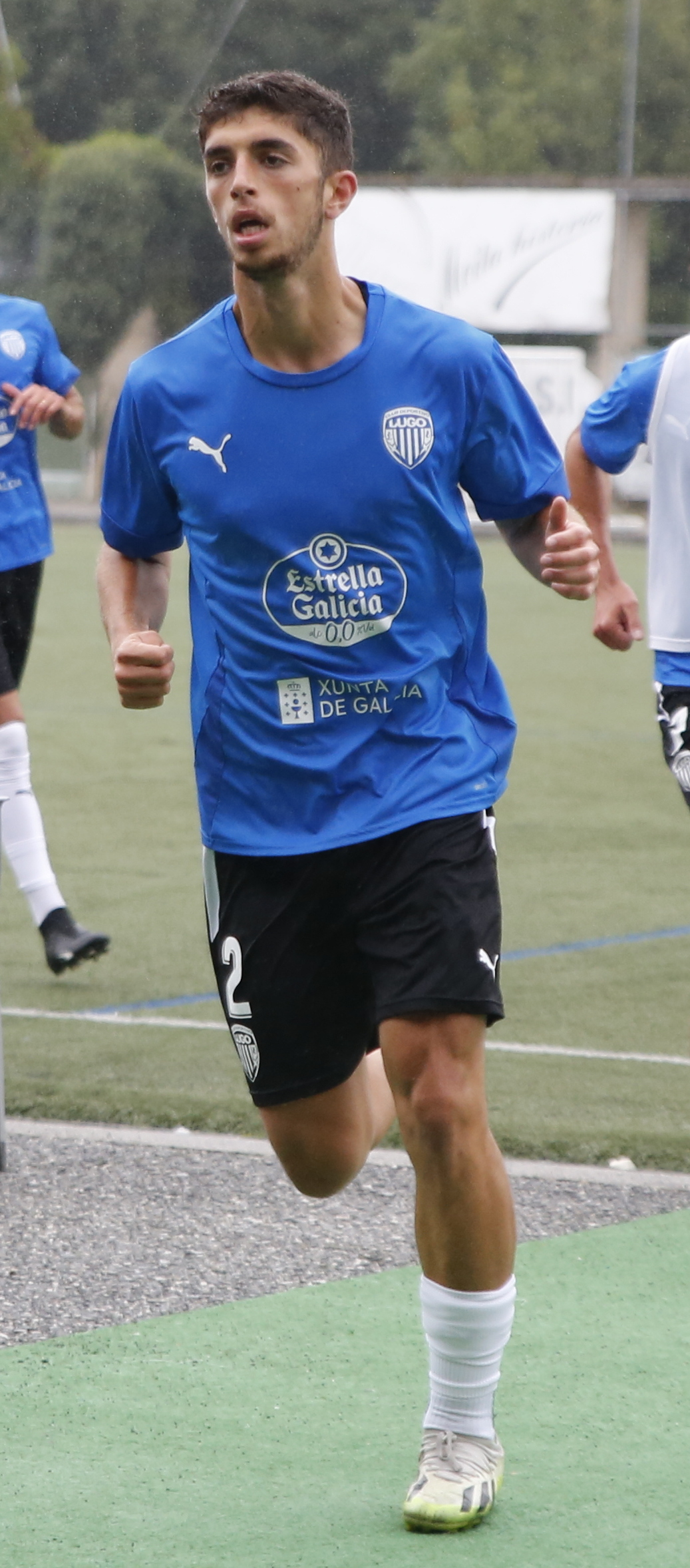
- Lizancos with Lugo in 2024

Personal information
- Full name: Alejandro Lizancos Saldaña
- Date of birth: 14 September 2003 (age 23)
- Place of birth: Granada, Spain
- Height: 1.86 m (6 ft 1 in)
- Position: Right-back

Team information
- Current team: Burgos
- Number: 2

Youth career
- 2010–2012: Granada 74
- 2012–2014: Ciudad Granada
- 2014–2017: Granada
- 2017–2018: Atarfe Industrial
- 2018–2022: Santa Fe

Senior career*
Years	Team	Apps	(Gls)
2022–2023	Huétor Vega	29	(1)
2023–2024	Polvorín	26	(3)
2024–2025	Lugo	39	(1)
2025–	Burgos	37	(1)
- * Club domestic league appearances and goals as of 6 June 2026

Alejandro "Álex" Lizancos Saldaña (born 14 September 2003) is a Spanish footballer who plays as a right-back for Burgos CF.

== Career ==
Lizancos was born in Granada, Andalusia, and played for Granada 74 CF, CD Ciudad de Granada, Granada CF, Atarfe Industrial CF and CD Santa Fe as a youth. In 2022, after finishing his formation, he moved to Tercera Federación side CD Huétor Vega.

In 2023, Lizancos joined CD Lugo and was initially assigned to farm team Polvorín FC also in the fifth division. On 1 June of the following year, after already having made four appearances with the first team, he renewed his contract for two years and was definitely promoted to the main squad in Primera Federación.

Lizancos was a key unit for Lugo during the 2024–25 campaign, featuring in 40 matches as the club narrowly avoided relegation. On 15 July 2025, he signed a four-year contract with Segunda División side Burgos CF, for a rumoured fee of €200,000.

Lizancos made his professional debut on 15 August 2025, coming on as a late substitute for Anderson Arroyo in a 5–1 home routing of Cultural y Deportiva Leonesa.
