= César Soto Grado =

Spanish association football referee

- Full name: César Soto Grado
- Born: June 17, 1980 (age 46); Candeleda, Province of Ávila, Castile and León, Spain

Domestic
Years	League	Role
2010–2018	Segunda División B	Referee
2018–2019	Segunda División	Referee
2019–	La Liga	Referee

International
Years	League	Role
2022–	FIFA	Referee

César Soto Grado (born 17 June 1980) is a Spanish referee who officiates in La Liga. He has been a FIFA-listed referee since 2022.

== Career ==
Soto Grado began officiating in the Segunda División B during the 2010–11 season. After several years in the lower divisions, he was promoted to the Segunda División for the 2018–19 season, and the following year he ascended to La Liga alongside fellow referee, Valentín Pizarro Gómez.

He has officiated matches in the Copa del Rey, Supercopa de España, and qualifying rounds for both the UEFA Champions League and the UEFA Europa Conference League.

== Season record ==
Category	Country	Years	Matches
Segunda División B	Spain	2010–2011	13
Segunda División B	Spain	2012–2018	80
Segunda División	Spain	2018–2019	21
La Liga	Spain	2019–	114
