= Ibercaja Stadium =

Football stadium in Zaragoza, Spain

- Mini Romareda
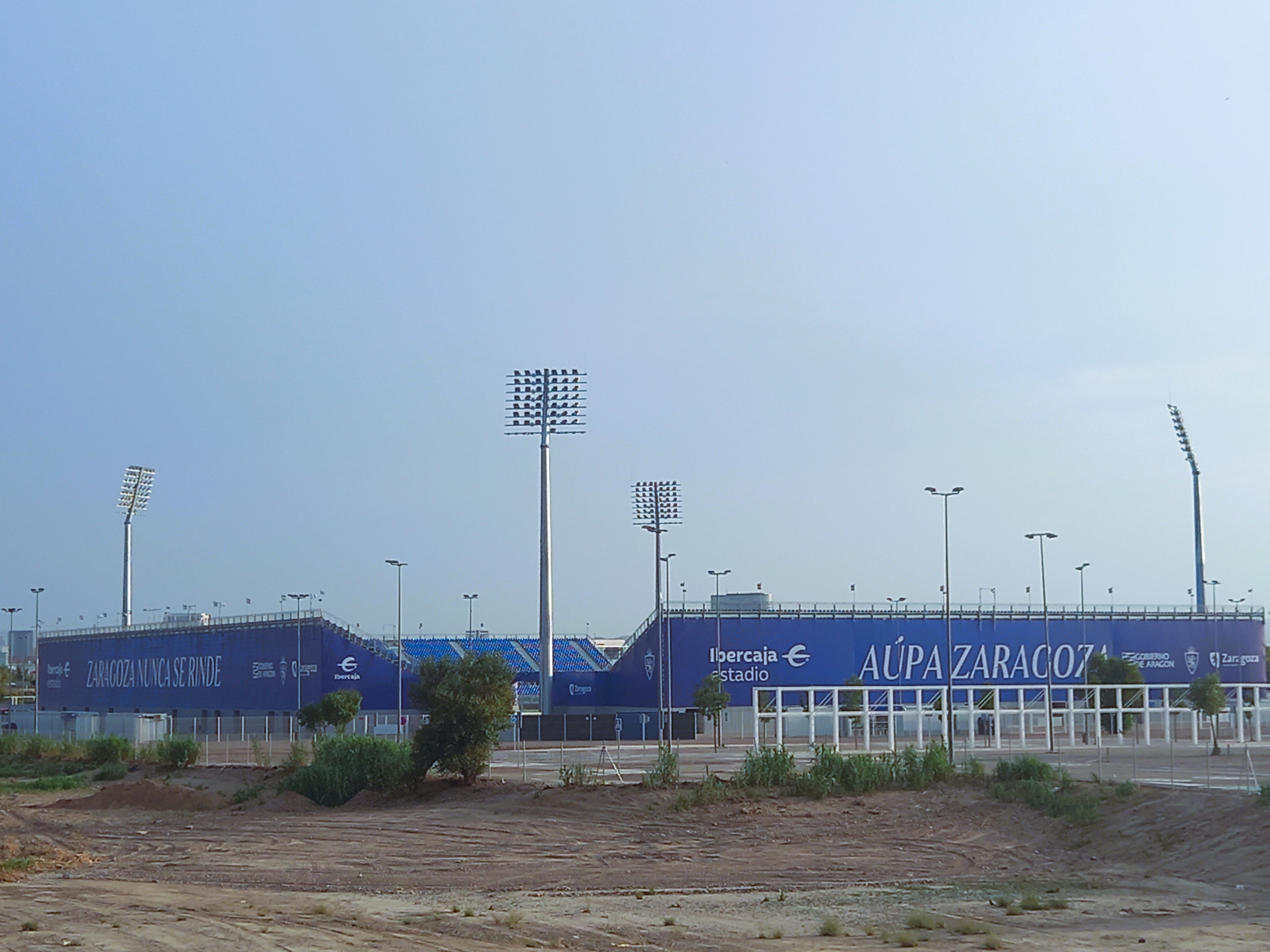
- Interactive map of Ibercaja Stadium
- Full name: Ibercaja Estadio
- Location: Parking Nte. Expo, s/n Zaragoza, Aragon, Spain
- Coordinates: 41°41′03.5″N 0°53′43.3″W
- Owner: Autonomous community of Aragon
- Capacity: 20,000
- Surface: Artificial grass
- Field size: 105 m × 68 m (344 ft × 223 ft)

Construction
- Groundbreaking: 20 January 2025
- Built: January 2025 – July 2025
- Opened: 24 July 2025
- Cost: 5.6 million euro
- Architects: NUSSLI Group, Grupo MLN

Tenant
- Zaragoza (2025–2027)

Ibercaja Stadium is a football stadium in the autonomous city of Zaragoza, Aragon, Spain. It is the temporary home stadium of Zaragoza, who currently plays in Primera Federación, with a capacity of 20,000 seats.

== History ==
Designed to become a two-year replacement to La Romareda, which was being redeveloped, the initial project of the stadium was approved by the Zaragoza City Council in December 2024, as a temporary stadium to be built under four months with a cost of € 2,590,751.85, replacing the parking lots (Parking Norte de la Expo) located next to the Corona de Aragón athletics stadium. A consortium of companies composed of the local Grupo MLN and the NUSSLI Group from Switzerland is responsible for the construction.

Construction began in January 2025, with the stadium having four independent stands, totalling a capacity of 20,103 places. Stands were installed in the stadium in April, and the artificial grass was installed in June.

On 1 July 2025, Ibercaja Banco reached a ten-year naming rights agreement with Zaragoza for both the new stadium and La Romareda, for a fee of € 19 million; the new stadium was then named "Ibercaja Estadio" (Ibercaja Stadium). On 24 July, the stadium was officially inaugurated by Jorge Azcón, the President of the Government of Aragon, Natalia Chueca, the mayor of Zaragoza, and Real Zaragoza board members Juan Forcén, Mariano Aguilar and Fernando López, and its capacity was confirmed to be 20,000 instead of the 20,103 previously released. It became the first modular and demountable stadium in Spanish football.

Ibercaja Stadium's first match with fans was held on 30 July 2025, as Zaragoza defeated Mirandés 2–0; the first goal of the stadium was scored by Dani Gómez. The first official match was held on 23 August, as Zaragoza lost 3–1 to FC Andorra.
