= Yuncos =

- Municipality
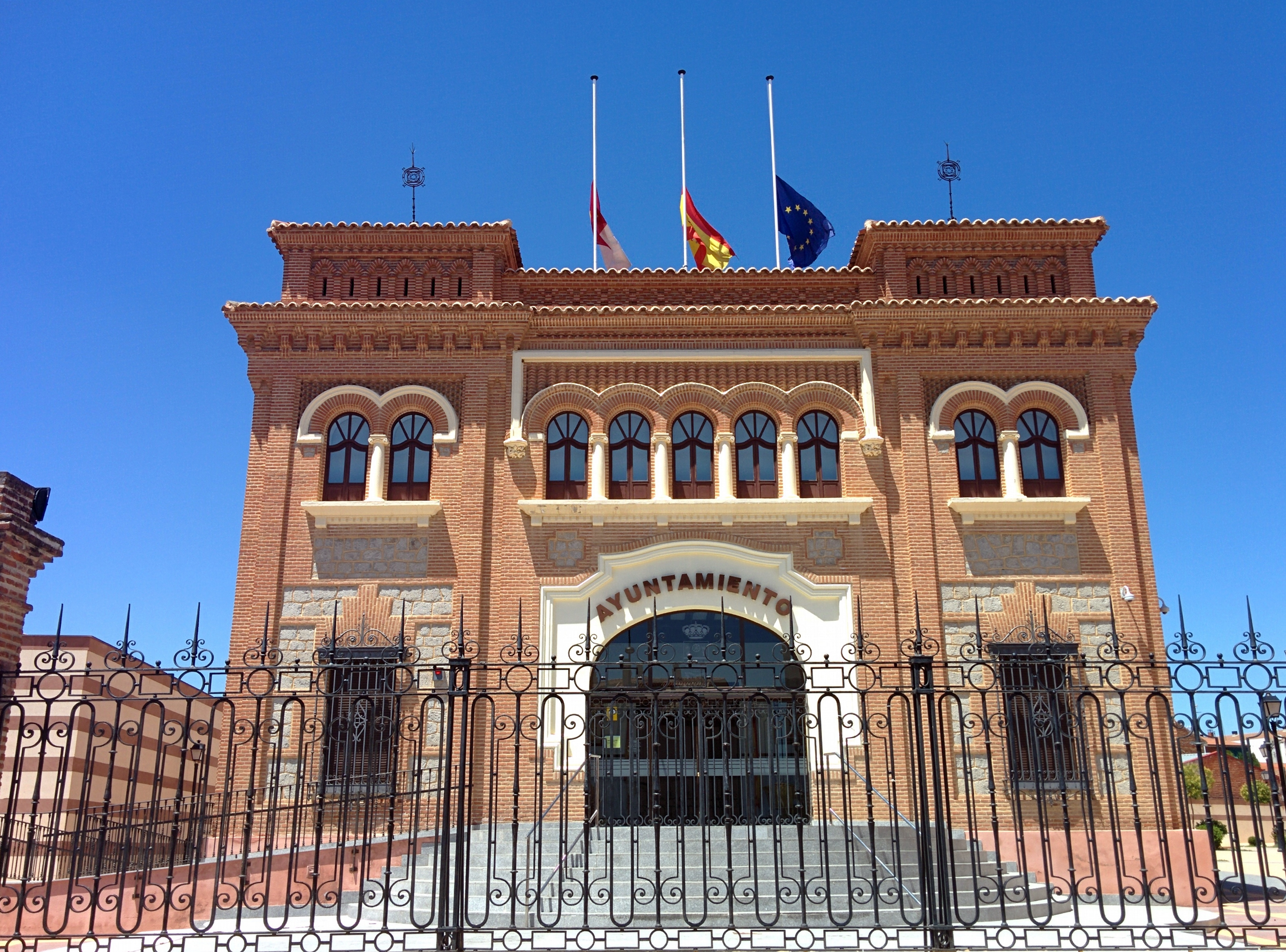
- Town hall

- Coat of arms

- Location in Spain
- Coordinates: 40°05′N 3°52′W
- Country: Spain
- Autonomous community: Castile-La Mancha
- Province: Toledo
- Municipality: Yuncos

Area
  - Total: 15 km^{2} (5.8 sq mi)
- Elevation: 551 m (1,808 ft)

Population (2025-01-01)
  - Total: 13,189
  - Density: 880/km^{2} (2,300/sq mi)
- Time zone: UTC+1 (CET)
  - Summer (DST): UTC+2 (CEST)

Yuncos is a municipality located in the province of Toledo, Castile-La Mancha, Spain. According to the 2018 census (INE), the municipality has a population of 10,968.
