= Atlètic Sant Just FC =

Association football club in Spain

Atlètic Sant Just
- Full name: Atlètic Sant Just Futbol Club
- Founded: February 2010; 16 years ago
- Ground: Municipal, Sant Just Desvern, Catalonia, Spain
- Capacity: 1,000
- President: Pep Palacios
- Manager: Marc Cabestany
- League: Lliga Elit
- 2025–26: Lliga Elit, 10th of 16
- Website: https://www.atsantjustfc.cat/
Home colours	Away colours

Atlètic Sant Just Futbol Club is a Spanish football team based in Sant Just Desvern, Barcelona, Catalonia. Founded in 2010, they play in the Lliga Elit, holding home matches at the Camp Municipal d'Esports El Molí.

== Season to season ==
Season	Tier	Division	Place	Copa del Rey
2010–11	9	3ª Terr.	6th	
2011–12	8	4ª Cat.	2nd	
2012–13	7	3ª Cat.	6th	
2013–14	7	3ª Cat.	9th	
2014–15	7	3ª Cat.	2nd	
2015–16	7	3ª Cat.	1st	
2016–17	6	2ª Cat.	6th	
2017–18	6	2ª Cat.	8th	
2018–19	6	2ª Cat.	1st	
2019–20	5	1ª Cat.	5th	
2020–21	5	1ª Cat.	5th	
2021–22	6	1ª Cat.	3rd	
2022–23	6	1ª Cat.	10th	
2023–24	7	1ª Cat.	2nd	
2024–25	6	Lliga Elit	4th	
2025–26	6	Lliga Elit	10th	First round
2026–27	6	Lliga Elit		
