= Campanario, Badajoz =

Municipality in Spain

Campanario
- Flag Coat of arms

- Location of Campanario within Extremadura
- Coordinates: 38°51′49″N 5°37′2″W
- Country: Spain
- Autonomous community: Extremadura
- Province: Badajoz
- Comarca: La Serena

Government
  - Alcaldesa: María Piedra-Escrita Jiménez Díaz

Area
  - Total: 284 km^{2} (110 sq mi)

Population (2025-01-01)
  - Total: 4,702
- Time zone: UTC+1 (CET)
  - Summer (DST): UTC+2 (CEST)
- Website: Ayuntamiento de Campanario

Campanario is a Spanish municipality in the province of Badajoz, Extremadura. It has a population of 5,470 (2007) and an area of 284 km^{2} (110 sq mi).

== See also ==
- List of municipalities in Badajoz
