= Universitario FC =

Spanish football club

Universitario
- Full name: Universitario Fútbol Club
- Founded: May 2018
- Ground: Barrio Atlántico, Las Palmas, Canary Islands, Spain
- Capacity: 1,500
- President: Julio Suárez Cabrera
- Head coach: Andrés Gustavo
- League: Interinsular Preferente
- 2025–26: Interinsular Preferente, 4th of 19
Home colours	Away colours

Universitario Fútbol Club is a Spanish football team based in Las Palmas, in the autonomous community of Canary Islands. Founded in 2018, they play in Interinsular Preferente, holding home matches at Campo de Fútbol Barrio Atlántico, with a capacity of 1,500 people.

== Season to season ==
Season	Tier	Division	Place	Copa del Rey
2020–21	6	1ª Afic.	1st	
2021–22	6	Int. Pref.	2nd	
2022–23	6	Int. Pref.	10th	Preliminary
2023–24	6	Int. Pref.	14th	
2024–25	6	Int. Pref.	3rd	
2025–26	6	Int. Pref.		
