= Palma del Río =

- Municipality
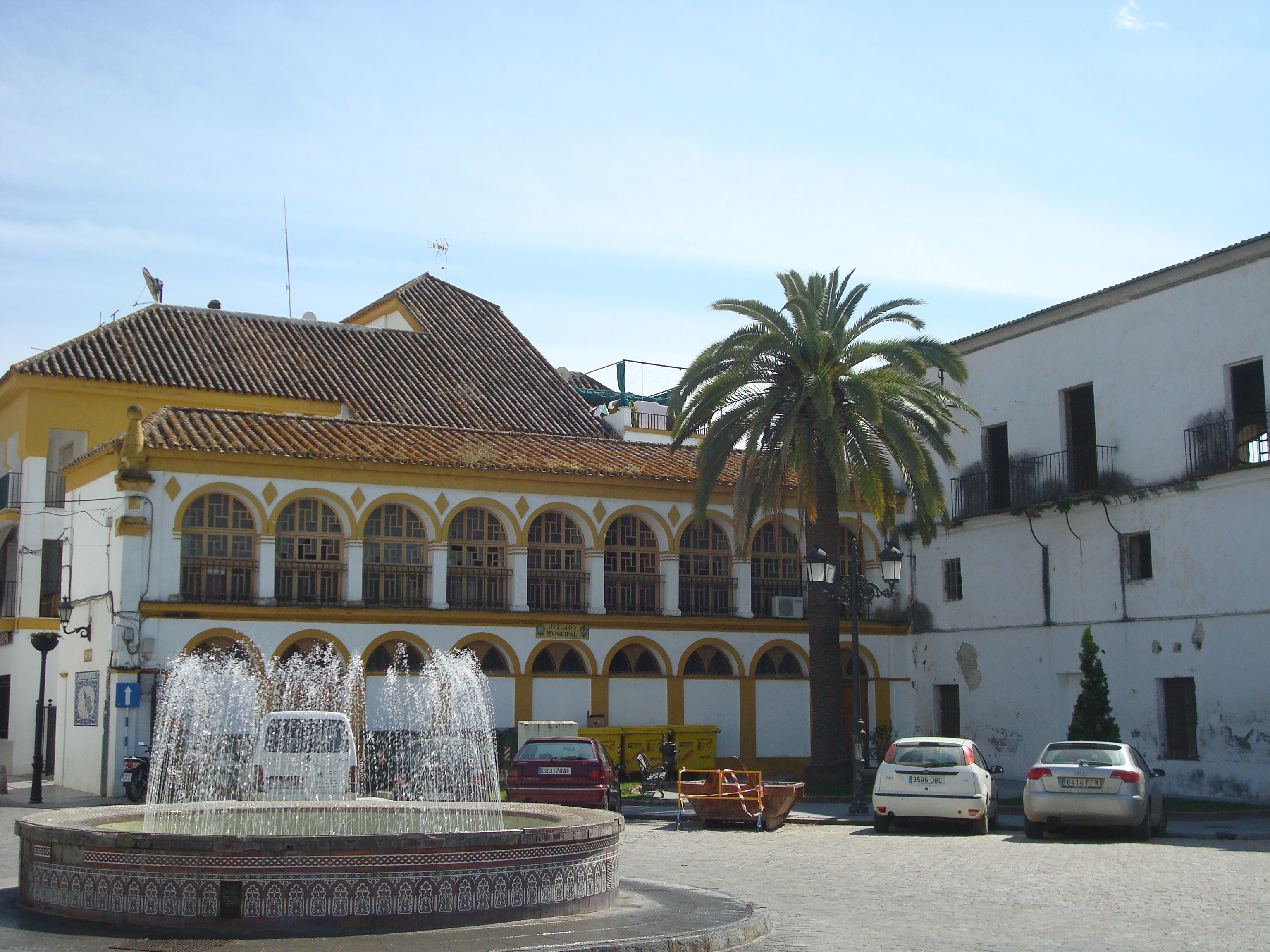

- Flag Seal
- Interactive map of Palma del Río
- Coordinates: 37°42′N 5°17′W
- Country: Spain
- Province: Córdoba
- Municipality: Palma del Río

Area
  - Total: 200 km^{2} (77 sq mi)
- Elevation: 55 m (180 ft)

Population (2025-01-01)
  - Total: 20,438
  - Density: 100/km^{2} (260/sq mi)
- Time zone: UTC+1 (CET)
  - Summer (DST): UTC+2 (CEST)
- Website: Official website

Palma del Río is a municipality located in the province of Córdoba, Spain. According to the 2006 census by the Instituto Nacional de Estadística, the city has a population of 20,640.

== Agriculture ==
The region was intensively developed agriculturally during Arab rule, with advanced irrigation and water wheels. Some of the orange groves contain trees over 200 years old.

== Notable people ==
- Aulus Cornelius Palma Frontonianus
- Juan Rodríguez Cabrillo, a famous explorer of North America, believed to have been born in this town in 1497.
- Luis Manuel Fernández de Portocarrero, archbishop of Toledo.
- El Cordobés, matador.
- Antonio José Sánchez Mazuecos, singer.

== See also ==
- List of municipalities in Córdoba
