= 2018–19 Real Oviedo season =

Real Oviedo
2018–19 season
- President: Jorge Menéndez
- Head coach: Sergio Egea
- Stadium: Carlos Tartiere
- Segunda División: 8th
- Copa del Rey: Second round
- Top goalscorer: League: Joselu (10); All: Joselu (10)
- Highest home attendance: 23,175 vs Sporting Gijón (17 November 2018)
- Lowest home attendance: 5,683 vs Rayo Majadahonda (4 June 2019)
Home colours	Away colours

The 2018–19 season is the 36th season in Segunda División played by Real Oviedo, a Spanish football club based in Oviedo, Asturias. It covers a period from 1 July 2018 to 30 June 2019.

== Players ==
=== Squad ===
As of 18 November 2018

No.	Name	Nat.	Place of Birth	Date of Birth (Age)	Joined	Signed From	Transfer Fee	Ends
Goalkeepers
1	Alfonso Herrero	(Spain)	(Castilla–La Mancha) Toledo	21 April 1994 (age 31)	2016	Real Oviedo Vetusta	Free	2020
13	Nereo Champagne	(Argentina) (Italy)	(Argentina) Salto	20 January 1985 (age 41)	2018	(Argentina) Olimpo	Free	2020
Defenders
2	Diegui Johannesson	(Iceland) (Spain)	(Asturias) Villaviciosa	3 October 1993 (age 32)	2011	Real Oviedo Vetusta	Free	2019
3	Oswaldo Alanís	(Mexico)	(Mexico) Morelia	18 March 1989 (age 37)	2018	Getafe	Free	2020
5	Juan Forlín	(Argentina) (Spain)	(Argentina) Reconquista	10 January 1988 (age 38)	2017	(Mexico) Querétaro	Free	2019
6	Carlos Hernández	(Spain)	(Andalusia) Jaén	15 September 1990 (age 35)	2017	Lugo	Free	2019
18	Christian Fernández	(Spain)	(Cantabria) Santander	15 October 1985 (age 40)	2016	Las Palmas	Free	2019
19	Carlos Martínez	(Spain)	(Navarre) Lodosa	9 April 1986 (age 40)	2018	Real Sociedad	Free	2019
23	Mossa	(Spain)	(Valencian Community) Valencia	24 January 1989 (age 37)	2017	Gimnàstic	Undisclosed	2019
Midfielders
7	Omar Ramos	(Spain)	(Canary Islands) Santa Cruz de Tenerife	26 January 1988 (age 38)	2018	Free agent	Free	2020
8	Ramón Folch	(Spain)	(Catalonia) Reus	4 October 1989 (age 36)	2017	Reus	Free	2021
10	Saúl Berjón	(Spain)	(Asturias) Oviedo	24 May 1986 (age 39)	2017	(Mexico) UNAM	Free	2019
11	Yoel Bárcenas	(Panama)	(Panama) Colón	23 October 1993 (age 32)	2018	(Mexico) Tijuana	Loan	2019
20	Sergio Tejera	(Spain)	(Catalonia) Barcelona	28 May 1990 (age 35)	2018	Gimnàstic	Free	2020
24	Javi Muñoz	(Spain)	(Community of Madrid) Parla	28 February 1995 (age 31)	2018	Alavés	Loan	2019
Forwards
9	Toché	(Spain)	(Region of Murcia) Santomera	1 January 1983 (age 43)	2015	Deportivo La Coruña	Free	2019
17	Ibrahima Baldé	(Senegal)	(Senegal) Dakar	4 April 1989 (age 37)	2018	(Romania) CFR Cluj	Free	2020
22	Joselu	(Spain)	(Andalusia) Cartaya	3 March 1991 (age 35)	2018	Granada	€220k	2022

=== Reserve team ===
Note: Flags indicate national team as defined under FIFA eligibility rules; some limited exceptions apply. Players may hold more than one non-FIFA nationality.

No.	Pos.	Nation	Player
26	GK	ESP	Gorka Giralt
27	MF	ESP	Viti Rozada
28	DF	ESP	Alejandro Prendes
29	MF	ESP	Dani Sandoval
30	MF	ESP	Edu Cortina
31	MF	ESP	Borja Sánchez

No.	Pos.	Nation	Player
32	FW	ESP	Steven Prieto
33	DF	ESP	Javi Hernández (on loan from Real Madrid)
34	MF	ESP	Jimmy Suárez
35	DF	ESP	Jorge Mier
36	MF	ESP	Javi Mier
37	DF	ESP	Josín

=== In ===
No.	Pos.	Nat.	Name	Age	EU	Moving from	Type	Transfer window	Ends	Transfer fee	Source
20	MF	(Spain)	Sergio Tejera	28	EU	Gimnàstic	Transfer	Summer	2020	Free	RealOviedo.es
14	MF	(Ghana)	Richard Boateng	25	Non-EU	Melilla	Transfer	Summer	2020	Free	RealOviedo.es
13	GK	(Argentina)	Nereo Champagne	33	EU	(Argentina) Olimpo	Transfer	Summer	2020	Free	RealOviedo.es
19	DF	(Spain)	Carlos Martínez	32	EU	Real Sociedad	Transfer	Summer	2019	Free	RealOviedo.es
24	MF	(Spain)	Javi Muñoz	23	EU	Alavés	Loan	Summer	2019	Free	RealOviedo.es
11	MF	(Panama)	Yoel Bárcenas	24	Non-EU	(Mexico) Tijuana	Loan	Summer	2019	Free	RealOviedo.es
17	FW	(Senegal)	Ibrahima Baldé	29	Non-EU	(Romania) CFR Cluj	Transfer	Summer	2020	Free	RealOviedo.es
22	FW	(Spain)	Joselu	27	EU	Granada	Transfer	Summer	2022	€220k	RealOviedo.es
3	DF	(Mexico)	Oswaldo Alanís	29	Non-EU	Getafe	Transfer	Summer	2020	Free	RealOviedo.es
7	MF	(Spain)	Omar Ramos	30	EU	Unattached	Transfer	Winter	2020	Free	RealOviedo.es

=== Out ===
No.	Pos.	Nat.	Name	Age	EU	Moving to	Type	Transfer window	Transfer fee	Source
24	FW	(Colombia)	Olmes García	25	Non-EU	(Colombia) América de Cali	Loan Return	Summer		
16	FW	(Italy)	Diego Fabbrini	27	EU	(England) Birmingham City	Loan return	Summer		
14	FW	(Ghana)	Yaw Yeboah	21	Non-EU	(England) Manchester City	Loan Return	Summer		
15	MF	(Kenya)	McDonald Mariga	31	Non-EU	Unattached	Contract Ended	Summer		
10	FW	(Spain)	Miguel Linares	35	EU	Reus	Transfer	Summer	Free	CFReusDeportiu.com
22	MF	(Spain)	David Rocha	33	EU	Gimnàstic	Transfer	Summer	Free	GimnasticDeTarragona.cat
3	DF	(Spain)	Francisco Varela	23	EU	Rayo Majadahonda	Transfer	Summer	Free	RayoMajadahonda.es
4	DF	(Spain)	Héctor Verdés	34	EU	Rayo Majadahonda	Transfer	Summer	Free	RayoMajadahonda.es
20	DF	(Uruguay)	Guillermo Cotugno	23	EU	(Uruguay) Nacional	Transfer	Summer	Free	Marca
13	GK	(Spain)	Juan Carlos	30	EU	Numancia	Transfer	Summer	Free	CDNumancia.com
11	MF	(Slovenia)	Matej Pučko	24	EU	(Poland) Korona Kielce	Transfer	Summer	Free	Korona-Kielce.pl
17	MF	(Hungary)	Patrik Hidi	27	EU	Unattached	Contract Termination	Summer		RealOviedo.es
19	DF	(Argentina)	Nahuel Valentini	29	EU	(Italy) Ascoli Calcio	Transfer	Summer	Free	Ascoli Calcio Instagram
7	MF	(Spain)	Aarón Ñíguez	29	EU	(Malaysia) Johor Darul Ta'zim	Transfer	Summer	Free	JohorSouthernTigers.com.my
14	MF	(Ghana)	Richard Boateng	26	Non-EU	Alcorcón	Loan	Winter	Free	ADAlcorcon.com

=== Technical Staff ===
Position	Staff
Head coach	Sergio Egea
Assistant coach	Jose Luis Baroja
Physical trainer	Ignacio Gonzalo
Goalkeeping coach	Sergio Segura

Last updated: 14 May 2019
Source: Real Oviedo Webpage

== Pre-season and friendlies ==
Win Draw Loss Fixtures

18 July 2018 Friendly	Oviedo	1–0	Real Oviedo Vetusta	Oviedo
18:30 CEST	Carlos Hernández 4'	Report		Stadium: El Requexón

21 July 2018 Friendly	Oviedo	3–0	San Sebastián de los Reyes	Oviedo
19:30 CEST	Steven 15', 42'; Toché 84'	Report		Stadium: El Requexón

25 July 2018 Friendly	Ponferradina	0–0	Oviedo	Ponferrada
20:00 CEST		Report		Stadium: El Toralín; Attendance: 2,500; Referee: Daniel Blanco Núñez

28 July 2018 Friendly	Oviedo	2–1	Gimnástica Torrelavega	Villaviciosa
19:00 CEST	Toché 61'; Steven 74'	Report	Primo 86'	Stadium: Les Caleyes; Referee: Pelayo Quirós Pérez

1 August 2018 Friendly	Lugo	2–1	Oviedo	Xove
20:00 CEST	Dani Escriche 86', 89'	Report	Sandoval 84'	Stadium: Municipal de Xove; Referee: Daniel Pastoriza Iglesias

4 August 2018 Torneo Integra Energía	Alavés	1–0	Oviedo	El Berrón, Siero
19:30 CEST	Burgui 30'	Report		Stadium: Campo Municipal Sergio Sánchez

4 August 2018 Torneo Integra Energía	Oviedo	0–0	Valladolid	El Berrón, Siero
20:30 CEST		Report		Stadium: Campo Municipal Sergio Sánchez

8 August 2018 Trofeo Virgen Blanca	Huesca	1–2	Oviedo	Vitoria-Gasteiz
19:00 CEST	Camacho 80' (pen.)	Report	Toché 65' (pen.); Ibrahima 89' (pen.)	Stadium: Olaranbe; Referee: Iker Ruiz Rabanal

11 August 2018 Trofeo Villa de Foz	Oviedo	1–1 (4–1 p)	Deportivo La Coruña	Foz
19:00 CEST	Ibrahima 70'	Report	Domingos Duarte 60'	Stadium: Martínez Otero; Referee: Óscar Martínez Santos
	Penalties
	Javi Muñoz (penalty scored); Borja (penalty scored); Steven (penalty scored); Boateng (penalty scored)		(penalty missed) Carles Gil; (penalty missed) Fede Cartabia; (penalty scored) Mosquera

== Competitions ==
=== Segunda División ===
Pos	Team	Pld	W	D	L	GF	GA	GD	Pts	Promotion, qualification or relegation
6	Deportivo La Coruña	42	17	17	8	50	32	+18	68	Qualification to promotion play-offs
7	Cádiz	42	16	16	10	53	36	+17	64	
8	Oviedo	42	17	12	13	48	48	0	63	
9	Sporting Gijón	42	16	13	13	43	38	+5	61	
10	Almería	42	15	15	12	51	39	+12	60	

Source: La Liga
Rules for classification: 1) points; 2) head-to-head points; 3) head-to-head goal difference; 4) goal difference; 5) number of goals scored

==== Results summary ====
Overall								Home						Away					
Pld	W	D	L	GF	GA	GD	Pts	W	D	L	GF	GA	GD	W	D	L	GF	GA	GD
42	17	12	13	48	48	0	63	10	9	2	30	22	+8	7	3	11	18	26	−8

Last updated: 13 June 2019.
Source: LaLiga.es

==== Result round by round ====
Round	1	2	3	4	5	6	7	8	9	10	11	12	13	14	15	16	17	18	19	20	21	22	23	24	25	26	27	28	29	30	31	32	33	34	35	36	37	38	39	40	41	42
Ground	H	A	A	H	A	H	A	H	A	H	A	H	A	H	H	A	H	A	H	A	H	A	A	H	A	H	A	H	A	H	A	H	H	A	H	A	H	A	H	A	H	A
Result	D	W	D	L	W	D	L	W	L	W	L	D	L	W	W	D	L	L	D	W	W	W	L	W	W	W	D	D	L	W	L	D	D	W	D	W	D	L	W	L	W	L
Position	13	3	5	13	10	8	11	8	12	7	8	10	12	10	10	10	11	12	12	10	9	9	9	8	6	6	7	7	8	8	8	8	9	9	9	8	8	8	8	8	8	8

Updated to match(es) played on 13 June 2019. Source: LaLiga.es
A = Away; H = Home; W = Win; D = Draw; L = Loss

==== Matches ====
Win Draw Loss Fixtures

19 August 2018 1	Oviedo	1–1	Extremadura	Oviedo
19:00 CEST	Toché 11'; Joselu (yellow card) 88'	Report	Valverde (yellow card) 60'; Barrera 75'	Stadium: Carlos Tartiere; Attendance: 13,335; Referee: Javier Iglesias Villanueva (Galicia)

25 August 2018 2	Córdoba	2–4	Oviedo	Córdoba
22:00 CEST	Bambock (yellow card) 45'; Aythami (yellow card) 45'; Quintanilla (yellow card) 46'; Alfaro 52'; Piovaccari 73'	Report	Saúl Berjón 7', 57' (yellow card) 24'; Bárcenas 34', 81' (yellow card) 45'; Carlos Hernández 38'; Javi Muñoz (yellow card) 61'	Stadium: El Arcángel; Attendance: 12,774; Referee: Gorka Sagués Oscoz (Basque Country)

1 September 2018 3	Cádiz	1–1	Oviedo	Cádiz
19:00 CEST	Álex 77' (pen.); Rober (yellow card) 90+3'	Report	Mossa (yellow card) 55'; Tejera (yellow card) 72' (goal) 90+4'	Stadium: Ramón de Carranza; Attendance: 13,933; Referee: Dámaso Arcediano Monescillo (Castile–La Mancha)

8 September 2018 4	Oviedo	0–4	Zaragoza	Oviedo
18:00 CEST	Tejera (yellow card) 9'	Report	Álvaro 16'; Grippo (yellow card) 30'; Verdasca 54'; James Igbekeme 78'; Alberto Soro 87'; Aguirre (yellow card) 90+1'	Stadium: Carlos Tartiere; Attendance: 13,851; Referee: Daniel Ocón Arráiz (La Rioja)

16 September 2018 5	Lugo	0–2	Oviedo	Lugo
16:00 CEST	Vieira (yellow card) 81'; Leuko (yellow card) 85'	Report	Joselu 6'; Bolaño (yellow card) 19'; Javi Muñoz 56' (yellow card) 62'; Folch (yellow card) 71'	Stadium: Anxo Carro; Attendance: 4,534; Referee: Valentín Pizarro Gómez (Community of Madrid)

23 September 2018 6	Oviedo	1–1	Elche	Oviedo
16:00 CEST	Joselu 24'; Aarón Ñíguez (yellow card) 87'	Report	Manuel 5' (yellow card) 54'; Neyder (yellow card) 76'	Stadium: Carlos Tartiere; Attendance: 14,050; Referee: Abraham Domínguez Cervantes (Andalusia)

30 September 2018 7	Alcorcón	2–0	Oviedo	Alcorcón
12:00 CEST	Dorca 25'; Laure (yellow card) 33'; Bellvís (yellow card) 35'; Nono (yellow card) 37' (yellow-red card) 79'; Juan Muñoz 57'; Jiménez (yellow card) 90'	Report	Johannesson (yellow card) 51'; Javi Muñoz (yellow card) 56'; Mossa (yellow card) 73'; Tejera (yellow card) 88'	Stadium: Santo Domingo; Attendance: 3,339; Referee: Luis Mario Milla Albendiz (Andalusia)

7 October 2018 8	Oviedo	1–0	Albacete	Oviedo
16:00 CEST	Folch 10'; Bolaño (yellow card) 82'; Forlín (yellow card) 84'	Report	Bela (yellow card) 62'	Stadium: Carlos Tartiere; Attendance: 12,794; Referee: Óliver de la Fuente Ramos (Castile and León)

14 October 2018 9	Rayo Majadahonda	1–0	Oviedo	Madrid
16:00 CEST	Fede Varela (yellow card) 11'; Iza (yellow card) 68'; Luso 90+1'	Report	Aarón Ñíguez (yellow card) 33'; Tejera (yellow card) 68'	Stadium: Wanda Metropolitano; Attendance: 7,217; Referee: Jorge Figueroa Vázquez (Andalusia)

20 October 2018 10	Oviedo	2–1	Osasuna	Oviedo
16:00 CEST	Forlín (yellow card) 14'; Unai García 62' (o.g.); Bolaño (yellow card) 79'; Saúl Berjón 90'	Report	Unai García 3' (yellow card) 90+2'; Brandon (yellow card) 41'; Lillo (yellow card) 59' (yellow-red card) 82'	Stadium: Carlos Tartiere; Attendance: 12,325; Referee: Iñaki Vicandi Garrido (Basque Country)

28 October 2018 11	Gimnàstic	2–1	Oviedo	Tarragona
12:00 CET	Suárez 21'; Javi Márquez (yellow card) 26'; Sebas Coris (yellow card) 63'; Barreiro (yellow card) 74'; Albentosa (yellow card) 88' (goal) 90+3'	Report	Ibrahima 64' (yellow card) 74'; Bárcenas (yellow card) 73'; Folch (yellow card) 76' (yellow-red card) 81'	Stadium: Nou Estadi; Attendance: 3,754; Referee: Aitor Gorostegui Fernández-Ortega (Basque Country)

4 November 2018 12	Oviedo	1–1	Mallorca	Oviedo
16:00 CET	Ibrahima 9'; Mossa (yellow card) 35'; Forlín (yellow card) 61'; Bárcenas (yellow card) 67'	Report	Dani Rodríguez (yellow card) 43'; Lago Junior 52'; Abdón (yellow card) 59'	Stadium: Carlos Tartiere; Attendance: 13,077; Referee: José Antonio López Toca (Cantabria)

10 November 2018 13	Deportivo La Coruña	4–0	Oviedo	A Coruña
20:30 CET	Domingos Duarte 21'; Quique 65', 75'; Carlos Fernández 73'	Report		Stadium: Abanca-Riazor; Attendance: 18,871; Referee: Daniel Ocón Arráiz (La Rioja)

17 November 2018 14	Oviedo	2–1	Sporting Gijón	Oviedo
20:45 CET	Ibrahima 6'; Alanís 14'; Saúl Berjón (yellow card) 40'; Tejera (yellow card) 58'; Javi Hernández (yellow card) 88'	Report	Cristian Salvador (yellow card) 29'; Molinero (yellow card) 51'; Hernán (yellow card) 54'; Manzambi (yellow card) 88'	Stadium: Carlos Tartiere; Attendance: 23,175 (provisional information); Referee: Daniel Jesús Trujillo Suárez (Tenerife)

25 November 2018 15	Oviedo	3–0	Reus	Oviedo
18:00 CET	Mossa 46' (yellow card) 62'; Bárcenas 52'; Joselu 67'	Report	Ricardo Vaz (yellow card) 31'; Gonzalo Pereira (yellow card) 51'; Linares (yellow card) 56'; Alfred Planas (yellow card) 90'	Stadium: Carlos Tartiere; Attendance: 15,050; Referee: Jorge Figueroa Vázquez (Andalusia)

2 December 2018 16	Las Palmas	0–0	Oviedo	Las Palmas
20:30 CET, 19:30 WET	Castro (yellow card) 45'	Report	Javier Muñoz (yellow card) 48'; Johannesson (yellow card) 49'; Bolaño (yellow card) 64' (yellow-red card) 90+3'; Folch (yellow card) 84'	Stadium: Gran Canaria; Attendance: 11.612 (provisional information); Referee: Álvaro Moreno Aragón (Community of Madrid)

8 December 2018 17	Oviedo	1–2	Almería	Oviedo
20:00 CET	Mossa 2'; Javi Muñoz (yellow card) 51'; Javi Hernández (yellow card) 71' (yellow-red card) 75'; Tejera (yellow card) 79'; Bárcenas (yellow card) 90+5'	Report	José Corpas 15' (yellow card) 57'; Juan Carlos 18'; Álvaro (yellow card) 69'; Yan Eteki (yellow card) 80'	Stadium: Carlos Tartiere; Attendance: 12,408 (provisional information); Referee: Javier Iglesias Villanueva (Galicia)

15 December 2018 18	Granada	1–0	Oviedo	Granada
16:00 CET	Pozo (yellow card) 25'; Antonio Puertas (yellow card) 49'; Adrián Ramos 83'	Report	Champagne (yellow card) 68'; Mossa (yellow card) 89'	Stadium: Nuevo Los Cármenes; Attendance: 10,373 (provisional information); Referee: David Pérez Pallas (Galicia)

22 December 2018 19	Oviedo	0–0	Málaga	Oviedo
16:00 CET	Boateng (yellow card) 82'; Steven Prieto (yellow card) 88'	Report	Harper (yellow card) 90+4'	Stadium: Carlos Tartiere; Attendance: 12,825; Referee: Dámaso Arcediano Monescillo (Castile–La Mancha)

7 January 2019 20	Numancia	2–3	Oviedo	Soria
18:00 CET	Yeboah 50'; Diamanka 54'	Report	Javi Hernández 3' (yellow card) 57'; Bolaño (yellow card) 23' (goal) 90'; Viti (yellow card) 26'; Carlos Hernández 52'; Tejera (yellow card) 79'	Stadium: Los Pajaritos; Attendance: 3,183 (provisional information); Referee: Santiago Varón Aceitón (Balearic Islands)

12 January 2019 21	Oviedo	1–0	Tenerife	Oviedo
20:30 CET	Bárcenas 23'; Tejera (yellow card) 60'; Bolaño (yellow card) 70'; Toché (yellow card) 86'; Mossa (yellow card) 90+2'	Report	Naranjo (yellow card) 47'; Carlos Ruiz (yellow card) 76'; Alberto (yellow card) 77'; Malbašić (yellow card) 86'	Stadium: Carlos Tartiere; Attendance: 11,611; Referee: Isidro Díaz de Mera Escuderos (Castile–La Mancha)

20 January 2019 22	Extremadura	0–2	Oviedo	Almendralejo
20:00 CET	Kike Márquez (yellow card) 42'; Fausto Tienza (yellow card) 90'	Report	Joselu 35'; Mossa (yellow card) 49'; Carlos Hernández (yellow card) 53'; Bárcenas 54'; Toché (yellow card) 80'	Stadium: Francisco de la Hera; Attendance: 8,724; Referee: Abraham Domínguez Cervantes (Andalusia)

25 January 2019 23	Zaragoza	2–0	Oviedo	Zaragoza
21:00 CET	Zapater (yellow card) 50'; Álvaro 76', 90'	Report		Stadium: La Romareda; Attendance: 17,853; Referee: Jorge Figueroa Vázquez (Andalusia)

3 February 2019 24	Oviedo	2–1	Cádiz	Oviedo
16:00 CET	Carlos Hernández 13'; Johannesson 44'; Bárcenas (yellow card) 46'; Bolaño (yellow card) 58'	Report	José Mari (yellow card) 4'; Kecojević (yellow card) 17'; Machís 42'; Cifuentes (yellow card) 44'; Querol (yellow card) 58'; Salvi Sánchez (yellow card) 65'	Stadium: Carlos Tartiere; Attendance: 12,738 (provisional information); Referee: Gorka Sagués Oscoz (Basque Country)

9 February 2019 25	Elche	1–2	Oviedo	Elche
18:00 CET	Olmo (yellow card) 29'; Nino 70'; Juan Cruz (yellow card) 90+4'	Report	Javi Hernández (yellow card) 8'; Folch (yellow card) 16'; Carlos Hernández (yellow card) 45'; Joselu 53'; Toché 90+5' (pen.)	Stadium: Martínez Valero; Attendance: 9,331; Referee: Dámaso Arcediano Monescillo (Castile–La Mancha)

16 February 2019 26	Oviedo	1–0	Alcorcón	Oviedo
20:00 CET	Tejera (yellow card) 37' (goal) 81'; Bolaño (yellow card) 90+1'	Report	Parra (yellow card) 55'; Silvestre (yellow card) 84'	Stadium: Carlos Tartiere; Attendance: 14,377; Referee: Santiago Varón Aceitón (Balearic Islands)

23 February 2019 27	Albacete	0–0	Oviedo	Albacete
16:00 CET	Borja (yellow card) 15'; Zozulya (yellow card) 27'; Gentiletti (yellow card) 31'; Acuña (yellow card) 76'	Report	Folch (yellow card) 50'; Carlos Hernández (yellow card) 72'	Stadium: Carlos Belmonte; Attendance: 11,255; Referee: Oliver de la Fuente Ramos (Castile and León)

3 March 2019 28	Oviedo	1–1	Lugo	Oviedo
18:00 CET	Johannesson (yellow card) 29'; Tejera 31'	Report	Vieira 90'	Stadium: Carlos Tartiere; Attendance: 15,712; Referee: Jorge Figueroa Vázquez (Andalusia)

9 March 2019 29	Mallorca	1–0	Oviedo	Palma
16:00 CET	Estupiñán (yellow card) 45' (goal) 68'; Salva Sevilla (yellow card) 87'	Report	Alanís (yellow card) 23'; Tejera (yellow card) 35'; Toché (yellow card) 47'; Omar Ramos (yellow card) 67'; Ibrahima (yellow card) 79'	Stadium: Son Moix; Attendance: 7,876; Referee: Álvaro Moreno Aragón (Community of Madrid)

17 March 2019 30	Oviedo	2–0	Gimnàstic	Oviedo
12:00 CET	Viti (yellow card) 51'; Joselu 53'; Bolaño 80'	Report	Mikel (yellow card) 41'; Fali (yellow card) 45'	Stadium: Carlos Tartiere; Attendance: 12,430; Referee: Valentín Pizarro Gómez (Community of Madrid)

24 March 2019 31	Sporting Gijón	1–0	Oviedo	Gijón
20:45 CET	Isaac Cofie (yellow card) 3'; Đurđević (yellow card) 29'; Bolaño 32' (o.g.); Traver (yellow card) 57'; Peybernes (yellow card) 77'; Molinero (yellow card) 88'	Report	Saúl Berjón (yellow card) 17'; Javi Muñoz (yellow card) 18'; Carlos Hernández (yellow card) 63'; Mossa (yellow card) 68'; Bolaño (yellow card) 71'; Tejera (yellow card) 88'; Toché (yellow card) 90'; Ibrahima (yellow card) 90+1'	Stadium: El Molinón; Attendance: 26,748 (provisional information); Referee: Isidro Díaz de Mera Escuderos (Castile–La Mancha)

31 March 2019 32	Oviedo	1–1	Deportivo La Coruña	Oviedo
18:00 CEST	Bárcenas 10'; Mossa (yellow card) 45'; Bolaño (yellow card) 50'; Folch (yellow card) 57'; Champagne (yellow card) 86'	Report	Quique 53'; Álex Bergantiños (yellow card) 59'	Stadium: Carlos Tartiere; Attendance: 18,074; Referee: César Soto Grado (Castile–La Mancha)

6 April 2019 33	Oviedo	1–1	Las Palmas	Oviedo
20:30 CEST	Martínez (yellow card) 65'; Ibrahima 81'	Report	Timor (yellow card) 57'; Ruiz de Galarreta (yellow card) 85'; Rafa Mir 90+1'	Stadium: Carlos Tartiere; Attendance: 12,089; Referee: Saúl Ais Reig (Valencian Community)

14 April 2019 34	Reus	0–1	Oviedo	Reus
CEST				Stadium: Municipal
Note: Reus was expelled after the end of the first half of the season due to unpaid wages. Their matches of the second half were given to their opponents by 0–1.

21 April 2019 35	Oviedo	3–3	Córdoba	Oviedo
18:00 CEST	Ibrahima 2'; Saúl Berjón 9'; Jimmy Suárez (yellow card) 47'; Alanís (yellow card) 67'; Carlos Hernández (yellow card) 78'; Joselu 83'; Javier Muñoz (yellow card) 89'	Report	Álex Carbonell (yellow card) 7'; Piovaccari 39'; De las Cuevas (yellow card) 59'; Alfaro 68'; Andrés Martín 87'; Álex Menéndez (yellow card) 89'	Stadium: Carlos Tartiere; Attendance: 13,455; Referee: Dámaso Arcediano Monescillo (Castile–La Mancha)

27 April 2019 36	Almería	0–1	Oviedo	Almería
18:00 CEST	Chema (yellow card) 70'	Report	Tejera (yellow card) 27' (goal) 49'; Bárcenas (yellow card) 42'; Saúl Berjón (yellow card) 72'; Joselu (yellow card) 85'; Mossa (yellow card) 90+1'	Stadium: Juegos Mediterráneos; Attendance: 7,978; Referee: Gorka Sagués Oscoz (Basque Country)

5 May 2019 37	Oviedo	1–1	Granada	Oviedo
20:30 CEST	Javi Hernández (yellow card) 42'; Bolaño (yellow card) 55'; Tejera (yellow card) 57'; Ibrahima 88'	Report	Germán (yellow card) 5'; Vico 50' (yellow card) 81'; Vadillo (yellow card) 59'; Rui Silva (yellow card) 72'; Antonio Puertas (yellow card) 86'; Quini (yellow card) 90+2'; Martínez (yellow card) 90+4'	Stadium: Carlos Tartiere; Attendance: 12,770 (provisional information); Referee: Óliver de la Fuente Ramos (Castile and León)

13 May 2019 38	Málaga	3–0	Oviedo	Málaga
21:00 CEST	Adrián 16' (pen.); Keidi Bare (red card) 30'; Ontiveros 45'; Cifuentes 80'	Report	Jimmy Suárez (yellow card) 43'; Carlos Hernández (yellow card) 53'; Joselu (yellow card) 63'	Stadium: La Rosaleda; Attendance: 15,894 (provisional information); Referee: Juan Luis Pulido Santana (Las Palmas)

19 May 2019 39	Oviedo	1–0	Numancia	Oviedo
16:00 CEST	Javi Hernández (yellow card) 14'; Bolaño (yellow card) 33'; Carlos Hernández 47'; Saúl Berjón (yellow card) 54'	Report	Yaw Yeboah (yellow card) 83'; David (yellow card) 89'; Escassi (yellow card) 89'	Stadium: Carlos Tartiere; Attendance: 10,202; Referee: Rubén Ávalos Barrera (Catalonia)

26 May 2019 40	Tenerife	2–1	Oviedo	Santa Cruz de Tenerife
18:00 CEST	Suso 41' (pen.) (yellow card) 76'; Carlos Ruiz 65'; Jorge Sáenz (yellow card) 68'; Dani Hernández (yellow card) 90+3'	Report	Jaime Suárez (yellow card) 5'; Tejera (yellow card) 16'; Carlos Hernández (yellow card) 40'; Joselu 77' (pen.) (yellow card) 88'	Stadium: Heliodoro Rodríguez López; Attendance: 16,488; Referee: César Soto Grado (Castile–La Mancha)

4 June 2019 41	Oviedo	4–3	Rayo Majadahonda	Oviedo
21:00 CEST	Folch (yellow card) 25'; Johannesson 42'; Bolaño (yellow card) 54'; Jimmy Suárez (yellow card) 74'; Carlos Hernández 80'; Joselu 86', 90+5' (yellow card) 90+3'; Tejera (yellow card) 89'	Report	Varela 26'; Verdés (yellow card) 55'; Morillas (yellow card) 60'; Verza (yellow card) 62'; Héctor Hernández 68'; Romera 71'; Basilio (yellow card) 86'	Stadium: Carlos Tartiere; Attendance: 5,683 (provisional information); Referee: Luis Mario Milla Alvendiz (Andalusia)

8 June 2019 42	Osasuna	1–0	Oviedo	Pamplona
20:30 CEST	Herrera (yellow card) 38'; Xisco 68'	Report	Mossa (footballer) (yellow card) 60'; Bolaño (yellow card) 73'; Jimmy Suárez (yellow card) 75'	Stadium: El Sadar; Attendance: 14,995; Referee: Óliver de la Fuente Ramos (Castile and León)

=== Copa del Rey ===
==== Second round ====
Win Draw Loss Fixtures

11 September 2018	Mallorca	1–0	Oviedo	Palma
18:45 CEST	Ferrán Giner 58'; Gámez (yellow card) 60'; Pablo Valcarce (yellow card) 66'	Report	Forlín (yellow card) 74'; Aarón Ñíguez (yellow card) 87'	Stadium: Son Moix; Attendance: 5,582 (provisional information); Referee: Iñaki Vicandi Garrido (Basque Country)

== Statistics ==
=== Squad statistics ===
No.	Pos	Nat	Player	Total		Segunda División		Copa del Rey	
No.	Pos	Nat	Player	Apps	Goals	Apps	Goals	Apps	Goals
1	GK	(Spain) ESP	Alfonso Herrero	13	0	13+0	0	0+0	0
2	DF	(Iceland) ISL	Diego Johannesson	36	2	30+6	2	0+0	0
3	DF	(Mexico) MEX	Oswaldo Alanís	24	1	24+0	1	0+0	0
5	DF	(Argentina) ARG	Juan Forlín	14	0	12+1	0	1+0	0
6	DF	(Spain) ESP	Carlos Hernández	27	4	27+0	4	0+0	0
7	MF	(Spain) ESP	Omar Ramos	12	0	4+8	0	0+0	0
8	MF	(Spain) ESP	Ramón Folch	35	1	31+3	1	1+0	0
9	FW	(Spain) ESP	Toché	27	2	7+19	2	1+0	0
10	MF	(Spain) ESP	Saúl Berjón	28	4	26+2	4	0+0	0
11	MF	(Panama) PAN	Yoel Bárcenas	38	6	36+1	6	0+1	0
13	GK	(Argentina) ARG	Nereo Champagne	29	0	28+0	0	1+0	0
17	FW	(Senegal) SEN	Ibrahima Baldé	33	6	12+20	6	1+0	0
18	DF	(Spain) ESP	Christian Fernández	37	2	36+0	2	1+0	0
19	DF	(Spain) ESP	Carlos Martínez	15	0	11+3	0	1+0	0
20	MF	(Spain) ESP	Sergio Tejera	35	4	32+2	4	1+0	0
22	FW	(Spain) ESP	Joselu	37	10	30+6	10	0+1	0
23	DF	(Spain) ESP	Mossa	32	2	25+7	2	0+0	0
24	MF	(Spain) ESP	Javi Muñoz	27	1	17+10	1	0+0	0
26	GK	(Spain) ESP	Gorka Giralt	0	0	0+0	0	0+0	0
27	MF	(Spain) ESP	Viti Rozada	14	0	9+5	0	0+0	0
28	DF	(Spain) ESP	Alejandro Prendes	0	0	0+0	0	0+0	0
29	MF	(Spain) ESP	Dani Sandoval	0	0	0+0	0	0+0	0
30	MF	(Spain) ESP	Edu Cortina	2	0	0+1	0	0+1	0
31	MF	(Spain) ESP	Borja Sánchez	1	0	0+1	0	0+0	0
32	FW	(Spain) ESP	Steven Prieto	8	0	1+7	0	0+0	0
33	DF	(Spain) ESP	Javi Hernández	26	1	24+1	1	1+0	0
34	MF	(Spain) ESP	Jimmy Suárez	10	0	10+0	0	0+0	0
35	DF	(Spain) ESP	Jorge Mier	1	0	0+1	0	0+0	0
36	MF	(Spain) ESP	Javi Mier	0	0	0+0	0	0+0	0
37	MF	(Spain) ESP	Josín	0	0	0+0	0	0+0	0
Players who have left the club after the start of the season:
7	MF	(Spain) ESP	Aarón Ñíguez	10	0	1+8	0	1+0	0
14	MF	(Ghana) GHA	Richard Boateng	14	0	6+7	0	1+0	0

- Last updated: 13 June 2019
- Source: LaLiga.es and Soccerway

=== Disciplinary record ===
N	P	Nat.	Name	Segunda División			Copa del Rey			Total			Notes
N	P	Nat.	Name	Yellow card	Second yellow card	Red card	Yellow card	Second yellow card	Red card	Yellow card	Second yellow card	Red card	Notes
1	GK	(Spain)	Alfonso Herrero										
2	DF	(Iceland)	Diego Johannesson	3						3			
3	DF	(Mexico)	Oswaldo Alanís	2						2			
5	DF	(Argentina)	Juan Forlín	3			1			4			
6	DF	(Spain)	Carlos Hernández	8						8			
7	MF	(Spain)	Omar Ramos	1						1			
8	MF	(Spain)	Ramón Folch	7	1					7	1		
9	FW	(Spain)	Toché	4						4			
10	MF	(Spain)	Saúl Berjón	5						5			
11	MF	(Panama)	Yoel Bárcenas	6						6			
13	GK	(Argentina)	Nereo Champagne	2						2			
17	FW	(Senegal)	Ibrahima Baldé	3						3			
18	DF	(Spain)	Christian Fernández	14	1					14	1		
19	DF	(Spain)	Carlos Martínez	1						1			
20	MF	(Spain)	Sergio Tejera	15						15			
22	FW	(Spain)	Joselu	5						5			
23	DF	(Spain)	Mossa	11						11			
24	MF	(Spain)	Javi Muñoz	7						7			
26	GK	(Spain)	Gorka Giralt										
27	MF	(Spain)	Viti Rozada	2						2			
28	DF	(Spain)	Alejandro Prendes										
29	MF	(Spain)	Dani Sandoval										
30	MF	(Spain)	Edu Cortina										
31	MF	(Spain)	Borja Sánchez										
32	FW	(Spain)	Steven Prieto	1						1			
33	DF	(Spain)	Javi Hernández	6	1					6	1		
34	MF	(Spain)	Jimmy Suárez	5						5			
35	DF	(Spain)	Jorge Mier										
36	MF	(Spain)	Javi Mier										
37	MF	(Spain)	Josín										
Players who have left the club after the start of the season:
7	MF	(Spain)	Aarón Ñíguez	2			1			3			
14	MF	(Ghana)	Richard Boateng	1						1			

Last updated: 13 June 2019
Source: LaLiga.es and Soccerway
Only competitive matches
(yellow card) = Number of bookings; (second yellow card) = Number of sending offs after a second yellow card; (red card) = Number of sending offs by a direct red card.
