= Luis Milla =

Luis Milla may refer to:

- Luis Milla (footballer, born 1966)
- Luis Milla (footballer, born 1994)
