= 2019–20 CD Tenerife season =

CD Tenerife
2019–20 season
- Owner: Miguel Concepción
- President: Miguel Concepción
- Head coach: Rubén Baraja
- Stadium: Heliodoro Rodríguez López
- Segunda División: 12th
- Copa del Rey: Round of 16
- Top goalscorer: League: Dani Gómez (9); All: Dani Gómez (11)
Home colours	Away colours	Third colours

The 2019–20 season was CD Tenerife's 108th season in existence and the club's 7th consecutive season in the second division of Spanish football. In addition to the domestic league, Tenerife participated in this season's edition of the Copa del Rey. The season was slated to cover a period from 1 July 2019 to 30 June 2020. It was extended extraordinarily beyond 30 June due to the COVID-19 pandemic in Spain.

== Players ==
=== First-team squad ===
As of 31 January 2020

Note: Flags indicate national team as defined under FIFA eligibility rules; some limited exceptions apply. Players may hold more than one non-FIFA nationality.

No.	Pos.	Nation	Player
1	GK	ESP	Adrián Ortolá
2	DF	ESP	Luis Pérez
3	DF	ESP	Álex Muñoz
4	MF	ESP	Iker Undabarrena
5	DF	ESP	Alberto Jiménez
6	MF	ESP	Luis Milla
7	MF	ESP	Javi Muñoz (on loan from Alavés)
8	MF	ESP	Borja Lasso
9	FW	ESP	Dani Gómez (on loan from Real Madrid)
10	MF	ESP	Suso (Captain)
11	FW	ESP	Álex Bermejo
12	MF	ESP	Matías Nahuel

No.	Pos.	Nation	Player
14	DF	ESP	Carlos Ruiz
15	DF	ESP	Lluís López (on loan from Espanyol)
16	MF	ESP	Aitor Sanz (2nd captain)
17	DF	SVK	Róbert Mazáň (on loan from Celta)
18	DF	ESP	Isma López
19	FW	ESP	Joselu (on loan from Real Oviedo)
20	FW	ARG	Ramón Miérez (on loan from Alavés)
21	DF	USA	Shaq Moore
23	DF	SRB	Nikola Šipčić
24	DF	ESP	Dani Lasure (on loan from Real Zaragoza)
25	GK	VEN	Dani Hernández
26	MF	ESP	Javi Alonso

=== Reserve team ===
Note: Flags indicate national team as defined under FIFA eligibility rules; some limited exceptions apply. Players may hold more than one non-FIFA nationality.

No.	Pos.	Nation	Player
28	FW	ESP	Elliot
29	FW	ESP	Jorge

No.	Pos.	Nation	Player
30	GK	ESP	Ignacio Otaño
32	MF	ESP	Álex Cruz

== Out on loan ==
Note: Flags indicate national team as defined under FIFA eligibility rules; some limited exceptions apply. Players may hold more than one non-FIFA nationality.

No.	Pos.	Nation	Player
—	GK	ESP	Carlos Abad (at Xanthi until 30 June 2020)
—	MF	ESP	Josué (at Barakaldo until 30 June 2020)
—	MF	ESP	Samuel Arbelo (at Barakaldo until 30 June 2020)
—	FW	SRB	Filip Malbašić (at Cádiz until 30 June 2020)

No.	Pos.	Nation	Player
—	FW	ESP	José Naranjo (at AEK Larnaca until 31 May 2020)
—	MF	ENG	Samuel Shashoua (at Baleares until 30 June 2020)
—	DF	ARG	Mauro dos Santos (at Albirex Niigata until 30 June 2020)

== Pre-season and friendlies ==
Win Draw Loss

6 August 2019 Friendly	Celta Vigo	0–1	Tenerife	Melgaço, Portugal
20:00 WEST (UTC+1)		Report	Malbašić 65'	Stadium: Centro de Estágios de Melgaço

== Competitions ==
=== Overview ===
Competition	First match	Last match	Starting round	Final position	Record							
Competition	First match	Last match	Starting round	Final position	Pld	W	D	L	GF	GA	GD	Win %
Segunda División	17 August 2019	20 July 2020	Matchday 1	12th	42	14	13	15	50	46	+4	33.33
Copa del Rey	17 December 2019	28 January 2020	First round	Round of 16	4	2	2	0	9	5	+4	50.00
Total					46	16	15	15	59	51	+8	34.78

Source: Competitions

=== Segunda División ===
==== League table ====
Pos	Team	Pld	W	D	L	GF	GA	GD	Pts
10	Alcorcón	42	13	18	11	52	50	+2	57
11	Mirandés	42	13	17	12	55	59	−4	56
12	Tenerife	42	14	13	15	50	46	+4	55
13	Sporting Gijón	42	14	12	16	40	38	+2	54
14	Málaga	42	11	20	11	35	33	+2	53 (Note: Málaga finished ahead of Oviedo on head-to-head points: Málaga 2–1 Oviedo, Oviedo 1–1 Málaga.)

Source: LaLiga Soccerway
Rules for classification: 1) points; 2) head-to-head points; 3) head-to-head goal difference; 4) goal difference; 5) number of goals scored

==== Results summary ====
Overall								Home						Away					
Pld	W	D	L	GF	GA	GD	Pts	W	D	L	GF	GA	GD	W	D	L	GF	GA	GD
42	14	13	15	50	46	+4	55	7	9	5	25	21	+4	7	4	10	25	25	0

Source: La Liga SmartBank

==== Results by round ====
Round	1	2	3	4	5	6	7	8	9	10	11	12	13	14	15	16	17	18	19	20	21	22	23	24	25	26	27	28	29	30	31	32	33	34	35	36	37	38	39	40	41	42
Ground	A	H	A	H	A	H	A	H	A	H	H	A	H	A	H	A	H	A	H	A	H	A	H	A	H	A	A	H	A	H	H	A	H	A	H	A	H	A	H	A	H	A
Result	L	W	L	D	W	D	L	W	L	L	L	D	D	D	L	D	W	L	L	D	L	W	L	W	D	W	W	D	W	L	W	L	D	W	W	W	D	W	D	D	L	L
Position	21	9	16	16	11	11	14	9	14	16	15	19	17	17	18	18	16	17	19	19	20	18	18	17	18	16	15	17	16	16	12	13	14	14	12	8	10	8	9	9	10	12

Source: La Liga SmartBank
A = Away; H = Home; W = Win; D = Draw; L = Loss

==== Matches ====
The fixtures were revealed on 4 July 2019.

17 August 2019 1	Zaragoza	2–0	Tenerife	Zaragoza
21:00 CEST (UTC+2)		Report		Stadium: La Romareda

25 August 2019 2	Tenerife	3–2	Numancia	Santa Cruz de Tenerife
20:00 CEST (UTC+2)		Report		Stadium: Heliodoro Rodríguez López

1 September 2019 3	Ponferradina	4–0	Tenerife	Ponferrada
20:00 CEST (UTC+2)		Report		Stadium: Estadio El Toralín

7 September 2019 4	Tenerife	0–0	Las Palmas	Santa Cruz de Tenerife
21:00 CEST (UTC+2)		Report		Stadium: Heliodoro Rodríguez López

15 September 2019 5	Albacete	0–4	Tenerife	Albacete
12:00 CEST (UTC+2)		Report		Stadium: Estadio Carlos Belmonte

19 September 2019 6	Elche	1–1	Tenerife	Elche
19:00 CEST (UTC+2)		Report		Stadium: Estadio Manuel Martínez Valero

22 September 2019 7	Tenerife	0–1	Fuenlabrada	Santa Cruz de Tenerife
20:00 CEST (UTC+2)		Report		Stadium: Heliodoro Rodríguez López

29 September 2019 8	Lugo	1–4	Tenerife	Lugo
21:00 CEST (UTC+2)		Report		Stadium: Estadio Anxo Carro

2 October 2019 9	Tenerife	0–1	Oviedo	Santa Cruz de Tenerife
21:00 CEST (UTC+2)		Report		Stadium: Heliodoro Rodríguez López

5 October 2019 10	Tenerife	1–2	Extremadura	Santa Cruz de Tenerife
20:30 CEST (UTC+2)		Report		Stadium: Heliodoro Rodríguez López

11 October 2019 11	Rayo Vallecano	2–1	Tenerife	Madrid
21:00 CEST (UTC+2)		Report		Stadium: Vallecas

20 October 2019 12	Tenerife	3–3	Racing Santander	Santa Cruz de Tenerife
18:00 CEST (UTC+2)	Malbašić 13'; Bermejo 33'; Lasso 50'; Luis Milla (yellow card) 87'	Report	Lombardo 37', 57'; Yoda (yellow card) 63', (goal) 90+3'; Figueras (yellow card) 67'; Buñuel (yellow card) 71'; Cejudo (yellow card) 80'; Olaortua (yellow card) 81'	Stadium: Heliodoro Rodríguez López; Attendance: 8,585; Referee: Santiago Varón Aceitón

26 October 2019 13	Mirandés	0–0	Tenerife	Miranda de Ebro
18:00 CEST (UTC+2)		Report		Stadium: Estadio Municipal de Anduva

2 November 2019 14	Tenerife	0–0	Huesca	Santa Cruz de Tenerife
20:00 CET (UTC+1)		Report		Stadium: Heliodoro Rodríguez López

8 November 2019 15	Girona	1–0	Tenerife	Girona
21:00 CET (UTC+1)		Report		Stadium: Estadi Montilivi

17 November 2019 16	Tenerife	1–1	Cádiz	Santa Cruz de Tenerife
21:00 CET (UTC+1)		Report		Stadium: Heliodoro Rodríguez López

22 November 2019 17	Sporting Gijón	0–2	Tenerife	Gijón
21:00 CET (UTC+1)		Report		Stadium: El Molinón

30 November 2019 18	Tenerife	1–3	Almería	Santa Cruz de Tenerife
18:00 CET (UTC+1)		Report		Stadium: Heliodoro Rodríguez López

6 December 2019 19	Málaga	2–0	Tenerife	Málaga
21:00 CET (UTC+1)		Report		Stadium: La Rosaleda Stadium

14 December 2019 20	Tenerife	0–0	Alcorcón	Santa Cruz de Tenerife
18:00 CET (UTC+1)		Report		Stadium: Heliodoro Rodríguez López

20 December 2019 21	Deportivo La Coruña	2–1	Tenerife	A Coruña
21:00 CET (UTC+1)		Report		Stadium: Estadio Riazor

4 January 2020 22	Tenerife	4–2	Albacete	Santa Cruz de Tenerife
18:00 CET (UTC+1)		Report		Stadium: Heliodoro Rodríguez López

15 January 2020 23	Huesca	2–1	Tenerife	Huesca
19:00 CET (UTC+1)		Report		Stadium: Estadio El Alcoraz

19 January 2020 24	Tenerife	1–0	Girona	Santa Cruz de Tenerife
20:30 CET (UTC+1)		Report		Stadium: Heliodoro Rodríguez López

25 January 2020 25	Las Palmas	0–0	Tenerife	Las Palmas
18:15 CET (UTC+1)		Report		Stadium: Estadio Gran Canaria

31 January 2020 26	Tenerife	2–1	Sporting Gijón	Santa Cruz de Tenerife
21:00 CET (UTC+1)		Report		Stadium: Heliodoro Rodríguez López

8 February 2020 27	Extremadura	2–4	Tenerife	Almendralejo
16:00 CET (UTC+1)		Report		Stadium: Estadio Francisco de la Hera

16 February 2020 28	Tenerife	0–0	Rayo Vallecano	Santa Cruz de Tenerife
20:30 CET (UTC+1)		Report		Stadium: Heliodoro Rodríguez López

22 February 2020 29	Tenerife	1–0	Elche	Santa Cruz de Tenerife
18:15 CET (UTC+1)		Report		Stadium: Heliodoro Rodríguez López

1 March 2020 30	Oviedo	1–0	Tenerife	Oviedo
18:15 CET (UTC+1)	Rodri 88' (pen.)	Report		Stadium: Estadio Carlos Tartiere; Attendance: 16,814; Referee: Álvaro Moreno Aragón

8 March 2020 31	Tenerife	1–0	Ponferradina	Santa Cruz de Tenerife
20:30 CET (UTC+1)	Šipčić 77'	Report		Stadium: Heliodoro Rodríguez López; Attendance: 9,392; Referee: Jon Ander González Esteban

12 June 2020 32	Fuenlabrada	1–0	Tenerife	Fuenlabrada
19:30 CEST (UTC+2)	Gassama 45'	Report		Stadium: Fernando Torres; Attendance: 0 Referee: Isidro Díaz de Mera Escuderos

15 June 2020 33	Tenerife	0–0	Málaga	Santa Cruz de Tenerife
21:30 CEST (UTC+2)		Report		Stadium: Heliodoro Rodríguez López

21 June 2020 34	Racing Santander	1–2	Tenerife	Santander
17:00 CEST (UTC+2)	Jon Ander 90+3'	Report	Joselu 10'; Bermejo 52'	Stadium: El Sardinero; Attendance: 0 Referee: Javier Iglesias Villanueva

24 June 2020 35	Tenerife	4–1	Mirandés	Santa Cruz de Tenerife
19:30 CET (UTC+1)		Report		Stadium: Heliodoro Rodríguez López

27 June 2020 36	Cádiz	0–2	Tenerife	Cádiz
19:30 CEST (UTC+2)				Stadium: Ramón de Carranza

30 June 2020 37	Tenerife	1–1	Deportivo La Coruña	Santa Cruz de Tenerife
19:30 CEST (UTC+2)	Sanz (yellow card) 55'; López (yellow card) 63'; Milla 82' (pen.)	Report	Mujaid (yellow card) 80'; Aketxe 90+2'	Stadium: Heliodoro Rodríguez López; Attendance: 0 Referee: Miguel Ángel Ortiz Arias

4 July 2020 38	Almería	1–2	Tenerife	Almería
19:30 CEST (UTC+2)				Stadium: Juegos Mediterráneos

9 July 2020 39	Tenerife	1–1	Zaragoza	Santa Cruz de Tenerife
21:45 CEST (UTC+2)	Milla 15' (pen.); Joselu (yellow card) 63'; Šipčić (yellow card) 76' (yellow-red card) 89'	Report	Suárez 5', (yellow card) 90+3'; Zapater (yellow card) 33'; Soro (yellow card) 80'; Torres (yellow card) 90+3'	Stadium: Heliodoro Rodríguez López; Attendance: 0 Referee: Jorge Figueroa Vázquez

13 July 2020 40	Alcorcón	0–0	Tenerife	Alcorcón
21:45 CEST (UTC+2)	Boateng (yellow card) 22'; Bellvís (yellow card) 59'; Elgezabal (yellow card) 89'; Diéguez (yellow card) 90+2'; Arribas (yellow card) 90+4'	Report	Sanz (yellow card) 6'; Lasure (yellow card) 13'	Stadium: Santo Domingo; Attendance: 0 Referee: Daniel Ocón Arráiz

17 July 2020 41	Tenerife	1–2	Lugo	Santa Cruz de Tenerife
21:00 CEST (UTC+2)	Milla 70'; López (yellow card) 82'	Report	Pita (yellow card) 46'; Herrera 54'; Seoane (red card) 60'; Hacen (yellow card) 73', (goal) 90+5'	Stadium: Estadio Heliodoro Rodríguez López; Attendance: 0 Referee: Óliver de la Fuente Ramos

20 July 2020 42	Numancia	2–1	Tenerife	Soria
21:00 CEST (UTC+2)	Zlatanović 11'; Curro 64'	Report	Šipčić 60'	Stadium: Los Pajaritos; Attendance: 0 Referee: Rubén Ávalos Barrera

=== Copa del Rey ===
17 December 2019 First round	Mensajero	0–3	Tenerife	Santa Cruz de La Palma (Note: Mensajero played at Rosendo Hernández instead of their regular stadium Silvestre Carrillo, also in Santa Cruz de La Palma as this one does not have floodlights.)
21:30 CET (UTC+1)		Report	Padilla 6'; Naranjo 37', 83'	Stadium: Rosendo Hernández; Attendance: 1,090; Referee: Miguel Ángel Ortiz Arias

11 January 2020 Second round	Rayo Majadahonda	1–1 (a.e.t.) (2–4 p)	Tenerife	Majadahonda
17:00 CET (UTC+1)	Mesa 56'	Report	Ruiz 16'	Stadium: Cerro del Espino; Attendance: 800; Referee: Jorge Figueroa Vázquez
	Penalties
	Llorente (penalty scored); Ródenas (penalty scored); Pulido (penalty missed); Martín (penalty missed)		(penalty scored) Santana; (penalty scored) Gómez; (penalty scored) Moore; (penalty scored) Milla

22 January 2020 Round of 32	Tenerife	2–1	Valladolid	Santa Cruz de Tenerife
21:00 CET (UTC+1)	Joselu 67'; Gómez 86' (pen.); Sanz (yellow card) 89'	Report	Sandro 52'; Fede (yellow card) 74'; Nacho (yellow card) 89'; Sánchez (yellow card) 90+3'	Stadium: Heliodoro Rodríguez López; Attendance: 8,403; Referee: David Medié Jiménez

28 January 2020 Round of 16	Tenerife	3–3 (a.e.t.) (2–4 p)	Athletic Bilbao	Santa Cruz de Tenerife
20:00 CET (UTC+1)	Joselu 8' (pen.), 21'; Undabarrena (yellow card) 22'; Muñoz (yellow card) 30'; Ruiz (yellow card) 41' (yellow-red card) 94'; Moore (yellow card) 92'; Gómez 105+1' (pen.); Ortolá (yellow card) 116'	Report	Herrerín (red card) 2'; Williams (yellow card) 7', (goal) 17', 54'; D. García (yellow card) 38'; R. García (yellow card) 77'; Berchiche (yellow card) 92', (goal) 118'; Martínez (yellow card) 99'	Stadium: Heliodoro Rodríguez López; Attendance: 17,482; Referee: Pablo González Fuertes
	Penalties
	Sanz (penalty scored); Nahuel (penalty scored); Joselu (penalty missed); Moore (penalty missed)		(penalty scored) R. García; (penalty scored) Muniain; (penalty scored) Vesga; (penalty missed) Martínez; (penalty scored) Villalibre
