= Daniel Sandoval =

Daniel Sandoval may refer to:

- Daniel Sandoval (boxer) (born 1991), Mexican boxer
- Daniel Sandoval (BMX rider) (born 1994), American BMX rider
- Danny Sandoval (born 1979), Venezuelan baseball player
- Dani Sandoval (born 1998), Spanish footballer
