= 2022–23 Getafe CF season =

Getafe CF
2022–23 season
- Owner: Ángel Torres
- President: Ángel Torres
- Head coach: Quique Sánchez Flores (until 27 April); José Bordalás (from 29 April)
- Stadium: Coliseum Alfonso Pérez
- La Liga: 15th
- Copa del Rey: Round of 32
- Top goalscorer: League: Enes Ünal (14); All: Enes Ünal (15)
Home colours	Away colours	Third colours

The 2022–23 season was the 40th season in the history of Getafe CF and their sixth consecutive season in the top flight. The club participated in La Liga and the Copa del Rey.

== Players ==
=== First-team squad ===
As of 17 January 2023.

Note: Flags indicate national team as defined under FIFA eligibility rules; some limited exceptions apply. Players may hold more than one non-FIFA nationality.

No.	Pos.	Nation	Player
1	GK	ESP	Kiko Casilla
2	DF	TOG	Djené (captain)
3	DF	ARG	Fabrizio Angileri
4	DF	URU	Gastón Álvarez (on loan from Boston River)
5	MF	ESP	Luis Milla
6	DF	POR	Domingos Duarte
7	FW	ESP	Jaime Mata
8	MF	ESP	Jaime Seoane
9	MF	ESP	Portu (on loan from Real Sociedad)
10	FW	TUR	Enes Ünal
11	MF	ESP	Carles Aleñá
12	DF	FRA	Jordan Amavi (on loan from Marseille)
13	GK	ESP	David Soria

No.	Pos.	Nation	Player
14	FW	ESP	Juanmi Latasa (on loan from Real Madrid)
15	DF	PAR	Omar Alderete (on loan from Hertha BSC)
16	MF	ESP	Ángel Algobia
17	FW	MAR	Munir El Haddadi
18	MF	URU	Mauro Arambarri
19	FW	ESP	Borja Mayoral
20	MF	SRB	Nemanja Maksimović
21	DF	ESP	Juan Iglesias
22	DF	URU	Damián Suárez (vice-captain)
23	DF	SRB	Stefan Mitrović
24	MF	ESP	Gonzalo Villar (on loan from Roma)
27	GK	ESP	Diego Conde

=== Out on loan ===
Note: Flags indicate national team as defined under FIFA eligibility rules; some limited exceptions apply. Players may hold more than one non-FIFA nationality.

No.	Pos.	Nation	Player
—	DF	ARG	Jonathan Silva (at Granada until 30 June 2023)
—	DF	URU	Erick Cabaco (at Granada until 30 June 2023)
—	MF	GHA	Sabit Abdulai (at Ponferradina until 30 June 2023)

No.	Pos.	Nation	Player
—	MF	CZE	Jakub Jankto (at Sparta Prague until 30 June 2023)
—	FW	ESP	Darío Poveda (at Cartagena until 30 June 2023)
—	FW	SCO	Jack Harper (at Hércules until 30 June 2023)

== Transfers ==
=== In ===
Date	Player	From	Type	Fee	Ref
1 July 2022	(Spain) Portu	Real Sociedad	Loan		
1 July 2022	(Spain) Jaime Seoane	Huesca	Transfer	Free	
11 July 2022	(Portugal) Domingos Duarte	Granada	Transfer	Undisclosed	
14 July 2022	(Argentina) Fabrizio Angileri	(Argentina) River Plate	Transfer	Undisclosed	
25 July 2022	(Spain) Luis Milla	Granada	Transfer	Undisclosed	
1 August 2022	(Spain) Borja Mayoral	Real Madrid	Transfer	Undisclosed	
10 August 2022	(Spain) Kiko Casilla	(England) Leeds United	Transfer	Free	
19 August 2022	(Paraguay) Omar Alderete	(Germany) Hertha BSC	Loan		
26 August 2022	(Spain) Juanmi Latasa	Real Madrid	Loan		
13 January 2023	(Spain) Gonzalo Villar	(Italy) Roma	Loan		
19 January 2023	(Spain) Darío Poveda	Ibiza	Loan return		

=== Out ===
Date	Player	To	Type	Fee	Ref
1 July 2022	(Spain) Hugo Duro	Valencia	Buyout clause	€4m	
1 July 2022	(Uruguay) Mathías Olivera	(Italy) Napoli	Transfer	Undisclosed	
5 July 2022	(Spain) Darío Poveda	Ibiza	Loan		
15 July 2022	(Spain) Rubén Yáñez	Málaga	Transfer	Free	
26 July 2022	(Uruguay) Erick Cabaco	Granada	Loan		
26 July 2022	(Argentina) Jonathan Silva	Granada	Loan		
10 August 2022	(Czech Republic) Jakub Jankto	(Czech Republic) Sparta Prague	Loan		
19 January 2023	(Spain) Darío Poveda	Cartagena	Loan		

== Pre-season and friendlies ==
Win Draw Loss Fixtures

Getafe began the preseason on 4 July, nearly six weeks before the start of the national championship.

12 July 2022 Friendly	Getafe	2–1	Preston North End	Dehesa de Campoamor
10:45 CEST (UTC+2)	Álvarez 50', 82'	Report	Ledson 1'	Stadium: Hotel Golf Campoamor

16 July 2022 Friendly	Leganés	2–0	Getafe	Leganés
20:00 CEST (UTC+2)	Cissé 32'; Kravets 64'	Report		Stadium: Estadio Municipal de Butarque; Referee: Dámaso Arcediano Monescillos

21 July 2022 Friendly	Cartagena	1–1	Getafe	San Pedro del Pinatar
19:00 CEST (UTC+2)	Ortuño 21'	Report	Portu 52'	Stadium: Pinatar Arena; Referee: Jorge Díaz Escudero

24 July 2022 Friendly	Getafe	0–0	Levante	San Pedro del Pinatar
10:30 CEST (UTC+2)		Report		Stadium: Pinatar Arena

27 July 2022 Friendly	Getafe	0–1	Elche	Algorfa
10:30 CEST (UTC+2)	Seoane (yellow card) 61'		Mourad 17'	Stadium: La Finca Golf & Spa Resort

7 August 2022 Friendly	Albacete	1–0	Getafe	Albacete
20:00 CEST (UTC+2)	Marín 59'; Boyomo (yellow card) 72'		Duarte (yellow card) 79'	Stadium: Estadio Carlos Belmonte

30 November 2022 Friendly	Getafe	0–1	Valladolid	Palencia
20:00 CET (UTC+1)				Stadium: Estadio Nueva Balastera

8 December 2022 Friendly	Getafe	0–1	Guadalajara	Getafe
18:00 CET (UTC+1)				Stadium: Coliseum Alfonso Pérez

23 December 2022 Friendly	Real Madrid	0–0	Getafe	Madrid
--:-- CET (UTC+1)				Stadium: Valdebebas

23 March 2023 Friendly	Real Jaén	2–3	Getafe	Jaén
18:30 CET (UTC+1)	Armengol 42'; Lozano 50'		Mata 21' (pen.), 37'; Latasa 51'	Stadium: Estadio de la Victoria

== Competitions ==
=== Overall record ===
Competition	First match	Last match	Starting round	Final position	Record							
Competition	First match	Last match	Starting round	Final position	Pld	W	D	L	GF	GA	GD	Win %
La Liga	15 August 2022	4 June 2023	Matchday 1	15th	38	10	12	16	34	45	−11	26.32
Copa del Rey	13 November 2022	3 January 2023	First round	Round of 32	3	2	0	1	7	5	+2	66.67
Total					41	12	12	17	41	50	−9	29.27

Source: Soccerway

=== La Liga ===
==== League table ====
Pos	Team	Pld	W	D	L	GF	GA	GD	Pts
13	Celta Vigo	38	11	10	17	43	53	−10	43
14	Cádiz	38	10	12	16	30	53	−23	42 (Note: Head-to-head points: Cádiz 8, Getafe 5, Valencia 3.)
15	Getafe	38	10	12	16	34	45	−11	42
16	Valencia	38	11	9	18	42	45	−3	42
17	Almería	38	11	8	19	49	65	−16	41

Source: LaLiga Santander
Rules for classification: 1) Points; 2) Head-to-head points; 3) Head-to-head goal difference; 4) Goal difference; 5) Goals scored; 6) Fair-play points (Note: Head-to-head record is used only after all the matches between the teams in question have been played)

==== Results summary ====
Overall								Home						Away					
Pld	W	D	L	GF	GA	GD	Pts	W	D	L	GF	GA	GD	W	D	L	GF	GA	GD
38	10	12	16	34	45	−11	42	7	6	6	21	20	+1	3	6	10	13	25	−12

Source: La Liga

==== Results by round ====
Round	1	2	3	4	5	6	7	8	9	10	11	12	13	14	15	16	17	18	19	20	21	22	23	24	25	26	27	28	29	30	31	32	33	34	35	36	37	38
Ground	H	A	H	A	H	A	H	H	A	H	A	A	H	A	H	A	H	A	H	A	H	H	A	H	A	H	A	A	H	A	H	A	H	A	H	A	H	A
Result	L	L	D	L	W	W	L	L	D	D	D	W	D	L	W	L	L	L	L	D	D	W	L	W	D	W	D	L	D	L	L	L	W	L	D	W	W	D
Position	20	20	18	19	18	14	14	16	16	17	17	14	15	15	14	14	15	16	19	19	19	16	19	16	18	13	14	15	15	16	18	19	18	18	17	16	14	15

Source: La Liga
A = Away; H = Home; W = Win; D = Draw; L = Loss

==== Matches ====
The league fixtures were announced on 23 June 2022.

15 August 2022 1	Getafe	0–3	Atlético Madrid	Getafe
19:30 CEST (UTC+2)	Ünal (yellow card) 19'; Aleñá (yellow card) 55'	Report	Morata 15', 59'; Griezmann 75'; Carrasco (yellow card) 90'	Stadium: Coliseum Alfonso Pérez; Attendance: 12,235; Referee: José María Sánchez Martínez

22 August 2022 2	Girona	3–1	Getafe	Girona
22:00 CEST (UTC+2)	Castellanos (yellow card) 33', (goal) 64'; Stuani 42'; Duarte 47' (o.g.); Juanpe (yellow card) 81'	Report	Mitrović (yellow card) 35'; Mayoral (yellow card) 46'; Djené (yellow card) 49'; Angileri (yellow card) 49', (red card) 90+7'; Aleñá (yellow card) 51'; Ünal 73', (yellow card) 90+7'	Stadium: Estadi Montilivi; Attendance: 10,460; Referee: Alejandro Muñiz Ruiz

28 August 2022 3	Getafe	0–0	Villarreal	Getafe
17:30 CEST (UTC+2)	Djené (yellow card) 3'	Report	Parejo (yellow card) 39'; Albiol (yellow card) 44'; Coquelin (yellow card) 73'; Torres (yellow card) 90+10'; Pedraza (yellow card) 90+10'	Stadium: Coliseum Alfonso Pérez; Attendance: 9,815; Referee: Jorge Figueroa Vázquez

4 September 2022 4	Valencia	5–1	Getafe	Valencia
21:00 CEST (UTC+2)	Lato 7'; Lino 14'; Castillejo 16', (yellow card) 45'; Nico 65'; Duro 68'; Moriba (yellow card) 75' (yellow-red card) 88'	Report	Aleñá (yellow card) 10'; Arambarri (yellow card) 41' (yellow-red card) 90+5'; Mayoral (yellow card) 54'; Munir (yellow card) 57'; Mitrović (yellow card) 71'; Álvarez 78'	Stadium: Mestalla; Attendance: 38,725; Referee: José Luis Munuera Montero

11 September 2022 5	Getafe	2–1	Real Sociedad	Getafe
18:30 CEST (UTC+2)	Mayoral (penalty missed) 14'; Aleñá (yellow card) 41', (goal) 48'; Ünal 45+5'; Iglesias (yellow card) 56'; Suárez (yellow card) 86'; Duarte (yellow card) 90+5'	Report	Méndez 50'; Gorosabel (yellow card) 74'	Stadium: Coliseum Alfonso Pérez; Attendance: 11,112; Referee: Juan Luis Pulido Santana

18 September 2022 6	Osasuna	0–2	Getafe	Pamplona
14:00 CEST (UTC+2)	R. García (yellow card) 35'; Ávila (red card) 43'; Vidal (yellow card) 48'; Peña (yellow card) 59'; Brašanac (yellow card) 64'; Budimir (yellow card) 69'; Moncayola (yellow card) 73'; D. García (yellow card) 75'	Report	Iglesias 30'; Duarte (yellow card) 35'; Milla (yellow card) 68' (yellow-red card) 90+1'; Álvarez 76'	Stadium: El Sadar; Attendance: 18,255; Referee: Isidro Díaz de Mera Escuderos

1 October 2022 7	Getafe	2–3	Valladolid	Getafe
16:15 CEST (UTC+2)	Djené (yellow card) 18'; Mayoral 29'; Suárez 31'; Soria (yellow card) 69'	Report	Kike (yellow card) 11'; Joaquín (yellow card) 14'; León 20' (pen.), 37'; Plano 49'; Aguado (yellow card) 72'; Weissman (yellow card) 73'; Masip (yellow card) 90+4'	Stadium: Coliseum Alfonso Pérez; Attendance: 10,958; Referee: Alejandro Muñiz Ruiz

8 October 2022 8	Getafe	0–1	Real Madrid	Getafe
21:00 CEST (UTC+2)		Report	Militão 3'	Stadium: Coliseum Alfonso Pérez; Attendance: 14,502; Referee: Antonio Mateu Lahoz

14 October 2022 9	Rayo Vallecano	0–0	Getafe	Madrid
21:00 CEST (UTC+2)	Trejo (penalty missed) 53'; Catena (yellow card) 81'; Bebé (yellow card) 85'	Report	Angileri (yellow card) 24'; Mitrović (yellow card) 42'; Algobia (yellow card) 83'	Stadium: Campo de Fútbol de Vallecas; Attendance: 13,076; Referee: Mario Melero López

18 October 2022 10	Getafe	2–2	Athletic Bilbao	Getafe
20:00 CEST (UTC+2)	Iglesias (yellow card) 14'; Suárez (yellow card) 19'; Duarte (yellow card) 25'; Aleñá 27', (yellow card) 31'; Mata (yellow card) 45+1'; Munir 76'; Algobia (yellow card) 90+1'	Report	I. Williams 2'; Sancet (yellow card) 18'; R. García 62'; Herrera (yellow card) 64'; Zarraga (yellow card) 80'; Martínez (yellow card) 90+2'	Stadium: Coliseum Alfonso Pérez; Attendance: 11,395; Referee: José Luis Munuera Montero

24 October 2022 11	Celta Vigo	1–1	Getafe	Vigo
21:00 CEST (UTC+2)	Núñez (yellow card) 42'; Aidoo 89'	Report	Ünal 43'; Mata (yellow card) 84'	Stadium: Balaídos; Attendance: 9,774; Referee: Pablo González Fuertes

31 October 2022 12	Elche	0–1	Getafe	Elche
21:00 CEST (UTC+2)	Boyé (penalty missed) 87'	Report	Ünal 54'; Amavi (yellow card) 72' (yellow-red card) 78'; Duarte (yellow card) 77'	Stadium: Martínez Valero; Attendance: 19,588; Referee: César Soto Grado

5 November 2022 13	Getafe	0–0	Cádiz	Getafe
14:00 CET (UTC+1)	Núñez (yellow card) 8'; Duarte (yellow card) 30'; Djené (yellow card) 33'; Portu (yellow card) 74' (yellow-red card) 90+7'; Álvarez (red card) 90+6'; Iglesias (yellow card) 90+7'	Report	Hernández (yellow card) 28' (yellow-red card) 90+10'	Stadium: Coliseum Alfonso Pérez; Attendance: 10,554; Referee: Alejandro Hernández Hernández

9 November 2022 14	Almería	1–0	Getafe	Almería
19:00 CEST (UTC+2)	Ely (yellow card) 8' (yellow-red card) 87'; Baptistão 26' (yellow card) 35'; De la Hoz (yellow card) 53'; Robertone (yellow card) 72'; Fernando (yellow card) 86'; Babić (yellow card) 90+6'; Ramazani (yellow card) 90+6'	Report	Alderete (yellow card) 4'; Aleñá (yellow card) 27'; Munir (yellow card) 76'; Iglesias (yellow card) 90+6'	Stadium: Power Horse Stadium; Attendance: 11,454; Referee: Alejandro Muñiz Ruiz

30 December 2022 15	Getafe	2–0	Mallorca	Getafe
17:00 CET (UTC+1)	Mayoral 51', 78'	Report	Muriqi (yellow card) 27'	Stadium: Coliseum Alfonso Pérez; Attendance: 9,755; Referee: Javier Alberola Rojas

8 January 2023 16	Sevilla	2–1	Getafe	Seville
18:30 CET (UTC+1)	Acuña 36'; Nianzou (yellow card) 45+3'; Rakitić (yellow card) 61'; Mir 80'; Álvarez (yellow card) 90'	Report	Alderete (yellow card) 32'; Mayoral (yellow card) 73', (goal) 87'; Portu (yellow card) 83'	Stadium: Ramón Sánchez Pizjuán; Attendance: 35,389; Referee: Juan Martínez Munuera

15 January 2023 17	Getafe	1–2	Espanyol	Getafe
14:00 CET (UTC+1)	Ünal 7'; Duarte (yellow card) 16'; Álvarez (yellow card) 90'	Report	Joselu 6'; Calero (yellow card) 30'; Cabrera (yellow card) 33'; Montes (yellow card) 51'; Puado 62'	Stadium: Coliseum Alfonso Pérez; Attendance: 10,286; Referee: Jorge Figueroa Vázquez

22 January 2023 18	Barcelona	1–0	Getafe	Barcelona
18:30 CET (UTC+1)	Pedri 35'; Dembélé (yellow card) 68'	Report	Alderete (yellow card) 44'; Ünal (yellow card) 82'	Stadium: Camp Nou; Attendance: 79,814; Referee: Javier Iglesias Villanueva

28 January 2023 19	Getafe	0–1	Real Betis	Getafe
21:00 CET (UTC+1)	Aleñá (yellow card) 61'; Villar (yellow card) 72'; Duarte (yellow card) 79'; Milla (yellow card) 90'	Report	Luiz Henrique (yellow card) 65'; Iglesias 86' (pen.); Juanmi (yellow card) 90+2'	Stadium: Coliseum Alfonso Pérez; Attendance: 11,573; Referee: Guillermo Cuadra Fernández

4 February 2023 20	Atlético Madrid	1–1	Getafe	Madrid
18:30 CET (UTC+1)	Koke (yellow card) 57'; Correa 60'; Saúl (yellow card) 81'; Depay (yellow card) 90'	Report	Djené (yellow card) 2'; Portu (yellow card) 34'; Aleñá (yellow card) 45+2'; Ünal 83' (pen.); Munir (yellow card) 90+5'; Álvarez (yellow card) 90+6'	Stadium: Cívitas Metropolitano; Attendance: 56,079; Referee: Antonio Mateu Lahoz

12 February 2023 21	Getafe	1–1	Rayo Vallecano	Getafe
14:00 CET (UTC+1)	Aleñá (yellow card) 45+3' (yellow-red card) 54'; Mayoral (penalty missed) 51'; Ünal 77'; Álvarez (yellow card) 86'; Arambarri (yellow card) 90'	Report	Comesaña (yellow card) 4'; Arambarri 38' (o.g.); Valentín (yellow card) 43'; A. García (yellow card) 45+1'; Balliu (yellow card) 50'; De Tomás (penalty missed) 87'	Stadium: Coliseum Alfonso Pérez; Attendance: 11,812; Referee: Isidro Díaz de Mera

20 February 2023 22	Getafe	1–0	Valencia	Getafe
21:00 CET (UTC+1)	Djené (yellow card) 21'; Villar (yellow card) 30'; Álvarez (yellow card) 73'; Alderete (yellow card) 76'; Mayoral 82', (yellow card) 82'; Portu (yellow card) 88'	Report	Duro (yellow card) 89'	Stadium: Coliseum Alfonso Pérez; Attendance: 10,112; Referee: Mario Melero López

27 February 2023 23	Villarreal	2–1	Getafe	Villarreal
21:00 CET (UTC+1)	Chukwueze 44'; Morales 52'	Report	Ünal 9'; Arambarri (yellow card) 56'	Stadium: Estadio de la Cerámica; Attendance: 13,090; Referee: Jorge Figueroa Vázquez

4 March 2023 24	Getafe	3–2	Girona	Getafe
14:00 CET (UTC+1)	Ünal 2', 14'; Mayoral 43'; Algobia (yellow card) 45+1'; Djené (yellow card) 69'; Duarte (yellow card) 72'; Maksimović (yellow card) 90'; Milla (yellow card) 90+2'	Report	Hernández (yellow card) 12'; Riquelme (yellow card) 24'; Castellanos 54'; Gutiérrez 80', (yellow card) 90+5'; Bueno (yellow card) 90'	Stadium: Coliseum Alfonso Pérez; Attendance: 9,802; Referee: Juan Martínez Munuera

10 March 2023 25	Cádiz	2–2	Getafe	Cádiz
21:00 CET (UTC+1)	Sobrino 39', (yellow card) 90+1'; Hernández (yellow card) 60'; Jarque (yellow card) 60'; Alcaraz 82' (pen.); Ledesma (yellow card) 90+14'; Carcelén (red card) 90+16'	Report	Duarte (yellow card) 27' (yellow-red card) 80'; Alderete (yellow card) 44'; Ünal 61' (pen.), 90+16' (pen.); Munir (yellow card) 72'; Mata (yellow card) 90+11'	Stadium: Nuevo Mirandilla; Attendance: 18,414; Referee: Alejandro Hernández Hernández

19 March 2023 26	Getafe	2–0	Sevilla	Getafe
18:30 CET (UTC+1)	Suárez (yellow card) 22'; Munir 50'; Villar (yellow card) 76'; Milla (yellow card) 81'; Álvarez (yellow card) 90+2'; Ünal 90+5'	Report	Jordán (yellow card) 20'; Badé (yellow card) 63'	Stadium: Coliseum Alfonso Pérez; Attendance: 12,253; Referee: Antonio Mateu Lahoz

1 April 2023 27	Athletic Bilbao	0–0	Getafe	Bilbao
16:15 CEST (UTC+2)		Report		Stadium: San Mamés; Attendance: 43,782; Referee: Javier Iglesias Villanueva

8 April 2023 28	Real Sociedad	2–0	Getafe	San Sebastián
18:30 CEST (UTC+2)	Guevara (yellow card) 5'; Oyarzabal (penalty missed) 44', 45+2'; Kubo 60'; Illarramendi (yellow card) 79'	Report	Milla (yellow card) 20'	Stadium: Reale Arena; Attendance: 27,606; Referee: Mario Melero López

16 April 2023 29	Getafe	0–0	Barcelona	Getafe
16:15 CEST (UTC+2)	Alderete (yellow card) 42'; Suárez (yellow card) 57'	Report	Gavi (yellow card) 2'	Stadium: Coliseum Alfonso Pérez; Attendance: 14,854; Referee: Juan Luis Pulido Santana

23 April 2023 30	Mallorca	3–1	Getafe	Palma
18:30 CEST (UTC+2)	Lee 56', 90+5'; Raíllo 64', (yellow card) 64'; Ruiz de Galarreta (yellow card) 88'	Report	Mayoral 23'; Alderete (yellow card) 32'; Villar (yellow card) 87'; Mata (yellow card) 90+6'	Stadium: Visit Mallorca Stadium; Attendance: 15,687; Referee: Pablo González Fuertes

26 April 2023 31	Getafe	1–2	Almería	Getafe
19:30 CEST (UTC+2)	Alderete (yellow card) 11'; Djené (red card) 45+3'; Mayoral 71'; Iglesias (yellow card) 76'	Report	Suárez 7', 58'; Melero (yellow card) 26'; Babić (yellow card) 88'	Stadium: Coliseum Alfonso Pérez; Attendance: 10,260; Referee: Javier Alberola Rojas

30 April 2023 32	Espanyol	1–0	Getafe	Cornellà de Llobregat
18:30 CEST (UTC+2)	Joselu 38'; Braithwaite (yellow card) 42'; Fernández (yellow card) 47'; Melamed (yellow card) 71'; Vidal (yellow card) 90+1'	Report	Aleñá (yellow card) 37'; Duarte (yellow card) 51'; Maksimović (yellow card) 57'; Villar (yellow card) 73'; Latasa (yellow card) 81'	Stadium: RCDE Stadium; Attendance: 26,953; Referee: José María Sánchez Martínez

3 May 2023 33	Getafe	1–0	Celta Vigo	Getafe
22:00 CEST (UTC+2)	Ünal 3' (pen.), (yellow card) 90+2'; Mitrović (yellow card) 7'; Suárez (yellow card) 24'; Arambarri (yellow card) 39'; Djené (yellow card) 60'; Iglesias (yellow card) 70'; Álvarez (yellow card) 79'	Report	Aidoo (yellow card) 21' (yellow-red card) 77'; Galán (yellow card) 39'; De la Torre (yellow card) 62'; Seferovic (yellow card) 87'	Stadium: Coliseum Alfonso Pérez; Attendance: 11,022; Referee: Guillermo Cuadra Fernández

13 May 2023 34	Real Madrid	1–0	Getafe	Madrid
21:00 CEST (UTC+2)	Camavinga (yellow card) 41'; Asensio 70'	Report	Mata (yellow card) 28'; Alderete (yellow card) 60'; Iglesias (yellow card) 83'; Seoane (yellow card) 90+3'	Stadium: Santiago Bernabéu; Attendance: 52,201; Referee: Juan Martínez Munuera

20 May 2023 35	Getafe	1–1	Elche	Getafe
18:30 CEST (UTC+2)	Munir 8'; Ünal (yellow card) 45+2'; Suárez (yellow card) 50'; Djené (yellow card) 90+3'; Soria (yellow card) 90+3'	Report	Boyé 45+1'; Bigas (yellow card) 49'	Stadium: Coliseum Alfonso Pérez; Attendance: 13,927; Referee: Javier Iglesias Villanueva

24 May 2023 36	Real Betis	0–1	Getafe	Seville
22:00 CEST (UTC+2)	Ruibal (yellow card) 45+2'; Luiz Felipe (yellow card) 60'; Pezzella (red card) 78'	Report	Aleñá (yellow card) 29'; Álvarez (yellow card) 40'; Alderete 68'; Soria (yellow card) 84'; Portu (yellow card) 86'; Suárez (yellow card) 90+5'	Stadium: Benito Villamarín; Attendance: 40,289; Referee: Ricardo de Burgos Bengoetxea

28 May 2023 37	Getafe	2–1	Osasuna	Getafe
19:00 CEST (UTC+2)	Portu (yellow card) 24'; Latasa 39'; Maksimović (yellow card) 54'; Djené (yellow card) 81'; Mata 90'	Report	Ávila 2'; Ezzalzouli (yellow card) 31'	Stadium: Coliseum Alfonso Pérez; Attendance: 13,510; Referee: Antonio Mateu Lahoz

4 June 2023 38	Valladolid	0–0	Getafe	Valladolid
21:00 CEST (UTC+2)	El Yamiq (yellow card) 45+5'	Report	Iglesias (yellow card) 45+4'; Álvarez (yellow card) 45+5'; Latasa (yellow card) 90+4'	Stadium: José Zorilla; Attendance: 25,517; Referee: José Luis Munuera Montero

=== Copa del Rey ===
13 November 2022 First round	San Roque Lepe	2–3 (a.e.t.)	Getafe	Lepe
18:30 CET (UTC+1)	Vázquez 19'; Rydstrand (yellow card) 42'; Haro (yellow card) 71'; Santisteban 90+5', (yellow card) 90+5'; González (yellow card) 120'; Marrufo (yellow card) 120+2'	Report	Latasa 48'; Djené (yellow card) 70'; Ünal 80'; Aleñá (yellow card) 87'; Mayoral 99'	Stadium: Ciudad de Lepe; Referee: Jesús Gil Manzano

20 December 2022 Second round	Diocesano	0–2	Getafe	Arroyo de la Luz (Note: Diocesano did not play the match in their main stadium Campo de la Federación, Cáceres, as it did not meet the broadcasting requirements.)
19:00 CET (UTC+1)		Report	Djené (yellow card) 27'; Munir 31', 53'	Stadium: Municipal; Attendance: 1,350; Referee: Jorge Figueroa Vázquez

3 January 2023 Round of 32	Levante	3–2	Getafe	Valencia
21:00 CET (UTC+1)	Postigo 52'; Muñoz 62'; Wesley 90+1'; Saracchi (yellow card) 90+4'; Vezo (yellow card) 90+4'; Iborra (red card) 90+4'	Report	Aleñá (yellow card) 22'; Munir 34', 56'; Duarte (yellow card) 46'; Djené (yellow card) 70'; Algobia (yellow card) 81'; Alderete (yellow card) 90+6'; Latasa (yellow card) 90+7'	Stadium: Ciutat de València; Attendance: 11,403; Referee: José María Sánchez Martínez
