= Steven Prieto =

Spanish footballer

Personal information
- Full name: Steven Nicanor Prieto Morales
- Date of birth: 30 July 1997 (age 29)
- Place of birth: Oviedo, Spain
- Height: 1.82 m (6 ft 0 in)
- Position: Forward

Team information
- Current team: Alcoyano
- Number: 3

Youth career
- Centro Asturiano
- Astur
- Sporting Gijón
- 2013–2014: Barcelona
- 2014–2015: Espanyol
- 2015–2016: Oviedo

Senior career*
Years	Team	Apps	(Gls)
2016–2021	Oviedo B	129	(39)
2017–2021	Oviedo	10	(1)
2020	→ Badajoz (loan)	0	(0)
2021–2022	Marino Luanco	28	(9)
2022–2023	Orihuela	28	(5)
2023–2024	Langreo	31	(3)
2024–2025	Llanera	18	(1)
2025	Torrent	12	(4)
2025–	Alcoyano	25	(1)

International career
2013	Spain U16		
2013	Spain U17	2	(0)
- * Club domestic league appearances and goals as of 7 May 2026

Steven Nicanor Prieto Morales (born 30 July 1997), often simply known as Steven, is a Spanish footballer who plays as a forward for Segunda Federación club Alcoyano.

== Club career ==
Born in Oviedo, Asturias to an Asturian father and a Colombian mother, Steven joined FC Barcelona's youth ranks in 2013, after stints at Fútbol Centro Asturiano Oviedo, Astur CF and Sporting de Gijón. He left the club the following year, and subsequently represented RCD Espanyol and Real Oviedo; he made his senior debut with the latter's reserves in 2016, in Tercera División.

Steven made his first team debut on 6 September 2017, coming on as a second-half substitute for Ramón Folch in a 0–1 home loss against CD Numancia, for the season's Copa del Rey. His Segunda División debut occurred on 18 November, as he replaced Juan Forlín in a 1–3 loss at Real Valladolid.

Steven scored his first professional goal on 18 March 2018, netting the winner in a 2–1 home victory over Granada CF. On 11 June of the following year, he was one of the seven players from the B-side who were promoted to the main squad for the 2019–20 campaign.

On 1 February 2020, Steven was loaned to Segunda División B side CD Badajoz until the end of the season. He made no appearances for the side and returned to Oviedo in July, where he again featured for the B's before being definitely promoted to the main squad on 1 July 2021, but terminated his contract on 20 July.
