= Jorge Mier =

Spanish footballer

Personal information
- Full name: Jorge Mier Martínez
- Date of birth: 4 February 1999 (age 27)
- Place of birth: Oviedo, Spain
- Height: 1.76 m (5 ft 9 in)
- Position: Right back

Team information
- Current team: Murcia
- Number: 2

Youth career
- Oviedo

Senior career*
Years	Team	Apps	(Gls)
2016–2021	Oviedo B	82	(0)
2019–2022	Oviedo	1	(0)
2021–2022	→ Unionistas (loan)	22	(1)
2022–2024	Amorebieta	56	(2)
2024–	Murcia	52	(2)

International career
2015	Spain U17	3	(0)
- * Club domestic league appearances and goals as of 10 June 2026

Jorge Mier Martínez (born 4 February 1999) is a Spanish footballer who plays as a right back for Murcia.

== Club career ==
Born in Oviedo, Asturias, Mier was a Real Oviedo youth graduate. He made his senior debut with the reserves on 21 August 2016, starting in a 0–0 Tercera División home draw against CD Colunga.

Mier made his first team debut on 3 February 2019, coming on as a late substitute for goalscorer Diegui Johannesson in a 2–1 home defeat of Cádiz CF in the Segunda División. He then featured regularly for the B-team before being definitely promoted to the main squad on 1 July 2021, but was loaned to Unionistas de Salamanca CF in Primera División RFEF on 24 August.

On 23 August 2022, Mier terminated his contract with Oviedo, and joined SD Amorebieta the following day. He was an undisputed starter for the side, contributing with two goals in 35 appearances as the club returned to the second division at first attempt.

On 15 July 2024, Mier joined Murcia in the third tier.

== Personal life ==
Mier's twin brother Javi is also a footballer who plays as a midfielder. Their older brother, Tato, was also an Oviedo youth graduate.

== Honours ==
Amorebieta

- Primera Federación: 2022–23 (Group 2 and overall champion)
