= Javier Muñoz (Spanish footballer) =

Spanish footballer

Javi Muñoz
Personal information
- Full name: Javier Muñoz Jiménez
- Date of birth: 28 February 1995 (age 31)
- Place of birth: Parla, Spain
- Height: 1.75 m (5 ft 9 in)
- Position: Midfielder

Team information
- Current team: Almería

Youth career
- 2001–2006: Parla Escuela
- 2006–2014: Real Madrid

Senior career*
Years	Team	Apps	(Gls)
2014	Real Madrid C	8	(1)
2014–2018	Real Madrid B	93	(7)
2014	Real Madrid	0	(0)
2017–2018	→ Lorca (loan)	35	(5)
2018–2021	Alavés	1	(0)
2018–2019	→ Oviedo (loan)	27	(1)
2020	→ Tenerife (loan)	13	(0)
2020–2021	→ Mirandés (loan)	39	(1)
2021–2023	Eibar	75	(2)
2023–2025	Las Palmas	72	(3)
2025–2026	Getafe	17	(0)
2026–	Almería	0	(0)

International career
2014	Spain U19	1	(0)
- * Club domestic league appearances and goals as of 27 May 2026

Javier Muñoz Jiménez (Spanish pronunciation: [xaˈβjeɾ muˈɲoθ]; born 28 February 1995) is a Spanish professional footballer who plays as a midfielder for UD Almería.

== Club career ==
Born in Parla, Madrid, Muñoz joined Real Madrid's youth system in 2006, aged 11, after starting out at local side CP Parla Escuela. He finished his youth training period in 2014, being immediately assigned to the C-team in Tercera División.

Muñoz was called up by the reserves in late September 2014, and made his debut for the side in a 3–0 home loss against SD Amorebieta in the Segunda División B. On 1 December he was included in the main squad's 17-man list for a Copa del Rey match against UE Cornellà, and played his first match as a professional on the following day, replacing James Rodríguez in the 63rd minute of the 5–0 home success (9–1 on aggregate).

On 19 July 2017, Muñoz was loaned to Lorca FC, newly promoted to Segunda División, on a one-year deal. Roughly one year later, he signed a three-year contract with Deportivo Alavés, being immediately loaned to Real Oviedo for one year.

Muñoz returned to Alavés for the 2019–20 season, and made his La Liga debut on 21 December 2019, starting in a 4–1 away loss against FC Barcelona. The following 31 January, he moved to CD Tenerife in the second division, on loan until June.

On 18 September 2020, Muñoz moved to CD Mirandés in the second tier, on loan for the 2020–21 campaign. The following 1 July, he agreed to a permanent two-year deal with SD Eibar also in division two.

On 16 June 2023, Muñoz signed a two-year contract with UD Las Palmas, newly-promoted to the top tier. On 4 July 2025, he moved to fellow league team Getafe CF on a three-year deal.

On 28 August 2026, Muñoz agreed to a two-year contract with UD Almería in division two.

== Career statistics ==
=== Club ===
As of match played 1 March 2021

Appearances and goals by club, season and competition
Club	Season	League			National cup		Other		Total	
Club	Season	Division	Apps	Goals	Apps	Goals	Apps	Goals	Apps	Goals
Real Madrid C	2014–15	Tercera División	7	1	—		—		7	1
Real Madrid B	2014–15	Segunda División B	28	2	—		—		28	2
Real Madrid B	2015–16	Segunda División B	36	4	—		3 (Note: Appearance(s) in Promotion Playoffs)	0	39	4
Real Madrid B	2016–17	Segunda División B	26	0	—		—		26	0
Real Madrid B	Total		90	6	0	0	3	0	93	6
Real Madrid	2014–15	La Liga	0	0	1	0	—		1	0
Lorca (loan)	2017–18	Segunda División	35	5	1	0	—		36	5
Alavés	2019–20	La Liga	1	0	0	0	—		1	0
Oviedo (loan)	2018–19	Segunda División	27	1	0	0	—		27	1
Tenerife (loan)	2019–20	Segunda División	13	0	0	0	—		13	0
Mirandés (loan)	2020–21	Segunda División	24	0	1	0	—		25	0
Career total			197	13	3	0	3	0	203	13
