= Juan Iglesias =

Spanish footballer

Personal information
- Full name: Juan Antonio Iglesias Sánchez
- Date of birth: 3 July 1998 (age 28)
- Place of birth: Valladolid, Spain
- Height: 1.85 m (6 ft 1 in)
- Position: Right-back

Team information
- Current team: Sevilla
- Number: 2

Youth career
- Valladolid

Senior career*
Years	Team	Apps	(Gls)
2015–2017	Valladolid B	16	(0)
2017–2018	Logroñés B	32	(5)
2018–2019	Logroñés	35	(0)
2019–2021	Getafe B	38	(0)
2020–2026	Getafe	159	(2)
2026–	Sevilla	0	(0)
- * Club domestic league appearances and goals as of 27 May 2026

Juan Antonio Iglesias Sánchez (born 3 July 1998) is a Spanish professional footballer who plays as a right-back for La Liga club Sevilla.

== Club career ==
=== Early career ===
Iglesias was born in Valladolid, Castile and León, and represented Real Valladolid as a youth. He made his senior debut with the reserves at the age of 17 on 23 August 2015, coming on as a second-half substitute for Dani Vega in a 0–0 Segunda División B home draw against Cultural y Deportiva Leonesa.

On 2 September 2017, after featuring sparingly, Iglesias joined UD Logroñés and was initially assigned to the B-team in Tercera División. He started to feature for the first team in April 2018, becoming a regular starter afterwards and being converted to a right back; in January 2019, he renewed his contract until June 2021.

=== Getafe ===
On 18 July 2019, Iglesias signed for another reserve team, Getafe CF B also in the third division. He made his first team debut on 17 December of the following year, starting in a 2–1 away win against CD Anaitasuna, for the season's Copa del Rey.

Iglesias made his La Liga debut on 30 December 2020, starting in a 0–1 away loss against Atlético Madrid. Ahead of the 2021–22 campaign, he was definitely promoted to Geta's main squad, and renewed his contract until 2026 on 19 August 2021.

Iglesias scored his first professional goal on 18 September 2022, netting the opener in a 2–0 away win over CA Osasuna.

=== Sevilla ===
On 11 June 2026, Iglesias agreed to a four-year deal with fellow top tier side Sevilla FC, as his contract with Getafe was due to expire.

== Career statistics ==
=== Club ===
As of match played 13 April 2024

Appearances and goals by club, season and competition
Club	Season	League			National cup (Note: Includes Copa del Rey)		Continental		Other		Total	
Club	Season	Division	Apps	Goals	Apps	Goals	Apps	Goals	Apps	Goals	Apps	Goals
Valladolid B	2015–16	Segunda División B	4	0	—		—		—		4	0
Valladolid B	2016–17	Segunda División B	12	0	—		—		—		12	0
Valladolid B	Total		16	0	—		—		—		16	0
Logroñés B	2017–18	Tercera División	30	5	—		—		—		30	5
Logroñés B	2018–19	Tercera División	2	0	—		—		—		2	0
Logroñés B	Total		32	5	—		—		—		32	5
Logroñés	2017–18	Segunda División B	2	0	0	0	—		—		2	0
Logroñés	2018–19	Segunda División B	33	0	2	0	—		4 (Note: Appearances in 2019 Segunda División B play-offs)	0	39	0
Logroñés	Total		35	0	2	0	—		4	0	41	0
Getafe B	2019–20	Segunda División B	23	0	—		—		—		23	0
Getafe B	2020–21	Segunda División B	15	0	—		—		—		15	0
Getafe B	Total		38	0	—		—		—		38	0
Getafe	2020–21	La Liga	10	0	2	0	—		—		12	0
Getafe	2021–22	La Liga	20	0	2	0	—		—		22	0
Getafe	2022–23	La Liga	32	1	3	0	—		—		35	1
Getafe	2023–24	La Liga	23	0	3	0	—		—		26	0
Getafe	Total		85	1	10	0	—		—		95	1
Career total			206	6	12	0	0	0	4	0	222	6
