= Dani Gómez (footballer, born 1998) =

Spanish footballer

Personal information
- Full name: Daniel Gómez Alcón
- Date of birth: 30 July 1998 (age 28)
- Place of birth: Alcorcón, Spain
- Height: 1.77 m (5 ft 10 in)
- Position: Forward

Team information
- Current team: FC Tokyo
- Number: 99

Youth career
- 2003–2009: Estudiantes Alcorcón
- 2009–2011: Alcorcón
- 2011–2017: Real Madrid

Senior career*
Years	Team	Apps	(Gls)
2017–2020	Real Madrid B	51	(14)
2019–2020	→ Tenerife (loan)	38	(9)
2020–2025	Levante	96	(11)
2022–2023	→ Espanyol (loan)	8	(0)
2024–2025	→ Valencia (loan)	14	(2)
2025–2026	Real Zaragoza	47	(13)
2026–	FC Tokyo	6	(5)

International career
2016–2017	Spain U19	4	(3)
2019–2021	Spain U21	8	(4)
- * Club domestic league appearances and goals as of 08:00, 7 November 2026 (UTC)

Daniel "Dani" Gómez Alcón (born 30 July 1998) is a Spanish professional footballer who plays as a forward for J1 League club FC Tokyo.

== Club career ==
Born in Alcorcón, Community of Madrid, Gómez joined Real Madrid's youth setup in 2011, from AD Alcorcón. Promoted to the reserves for the 2017–18 season, he made his senior debut on 19 August 2017, starting and scoring his team's only in a 2–1 Segunda División B home loss against CF Rayo Majadahonda.

On 26 July 2018, Gómez renewed his contract with Los Blancos. On 15 July of the following year, he agreed to a one-year loan deal with Segunda División side CD Tenerife.

Gómez made his professional debut on 17 August 2019, coming on as a second-half substitute for José Naranjo in a 2–0 away loss against Real Zaragoza. He scored his first goal in the second division on 15 September, netting the fourth in a 4–0 away routing of Albacete Balompié.

On 31 July 2020, after scoring 11 goals overall in the previous campaign, Gómez signed a five-year deal with La Liga side Levante UD. On 22 August 2022, after the club's relegation, he moved on loan to RCD Espanyol in the top tier, for one year.

On 2 August 2024, Gómez joined city neighbours Valencia CF on loan with a buy option. The following 3 February, he returned to the second division after signing a three-and-a-half-year contract with Real Zaragoza.

Following Zaragoza's relegation from La Liga 2 at the end of the 2025–26 season, Gómez joined J1 League club FC Tokyo in September 2026. He made his debut in the same month in a 2–0 J.League Cup victory over Ehime FC and scored his first goal for the club in his second game, scoring the second in a 4–0 Emperor's Cup win over Shonan Bellmare.

== Personal life ==
Gómez has been in a relationship with model Ana Cucoreanu since 2019. Their first son, Luca was born in December 2023.

== Career statistics ==
As of 8 October 2026.

Appearances and goals by club, season and competition
Club	Season	League			National Cup (Note: Includes Copa del Rey and Emperor's Cup)		League Cup (Note: Includes J.League Cup)		Other		Total	
Club	Season	Division	Apps	Goals	Apps	Goals	Apps	Goals	Apps	Goals	Apps	Goals
Real Madrid Castilla	2017–18	Segunda División B	25	6	—		—		—		25	6
Real Madrid Castilla	2018–19	Segunda División B	26	8	—		—		2 (Note: Appearances in the 2019 Segunda División B play-offs)	2	28	10
Real Madrid Castilla	Total		51	14	0	0	0	0	2	2	53	16
Tenerife (loan)	2019–20	Segunda División	38	9	4	2	—		—		42	11
Levante	2020–21	La Liga	34	2	6	0	—		—		40	2
Levante	2021–22	La Liga	28	4	2	4	—		—		30	8
Levante	2023–24	Segunda División	34	5	1	1	—		—		35	6
Levante	Total		96	11	9	5	0	0	0	0	105	16
Espanyol (loan)	2022–23	La Liga	8	0	1	0	—		—		9	0
Valencia (loan)	2024–25	La Liga	14	2	2	1	—		—		16	3
Real Zaragoza	2024–25	La Liga 2	14	4	0	0	—		—		14	4
Real Zaragoza	2025–26	La Liga 2	33	9	1	0	—		—		34	9
Real Zaragoza	Total		47	13	1	0	0	0	0	0	48	13
FC Tokyo	2026–27	J1 League	0	0	1	1	1	0	—		2	1
Career totals			254	49	18	9	0	0	2	2	275	60
