= Pablo Haro =

Spanish footballer

Personal information
- Full name: Pablo Haro Hernanz
- Date of birth: 17 June 1997 (age 29)
- Place of birth: Segovia, Spain
- Height: 1.78 m (5 ft 10 in)
- Position: Winger

Team information
- Current team: Atlético Central

Youth career
- Bellavista
- Nervión

Senior career*
Years	Team	Apps	(Gls)
2016	Nervión	5	(0)
2016–2019	Utrera	102	(9)
2019–2020	Las Palmas B	21	(2)
2019–2020	Las Palmas	4	(0)
2020–2022	Murcia	30	(2)
2021	Murcia B	2	(0)
2022–2023	San Roque de Lepe	32	(1)
2023–2024	San Sebastián de los Reyes	35	(2)
2024–	Atlético Central	3	(0)
- * Club domestic league appearances and goals as of 6 October 2024

Pablo Haro Hernanz (born 17 June 1997) is a Spanish footballer who plays for Atlético Central in the fifth-tier Tercera Federación as a right winger.

== Club career ==
Born in Segovia, Castile and León, Haro moved to Seville, Andalusia at early age and represented UD Bellavista and AD Nervión as a youth. He made his first team debut for the latter on 7 February 2016, playing the last nine minutes of a 2–1 Primera Andaluza away win against La Barrera CF.

On 13 August 2016, Haro signed for Tercera División side CD Utrera, after a trial period. On 8 July 2019, he joined UD Las Palmas and was assigned to the reserves in Segunda División B.

Haro made his first team debut for the Canarians on 17 December 2019, starting in a 2–0 away defeat of CD Castellón, for the season's Copa del Rey. He made his Segunda División debut the following 14 January, coming on as a late substitute for Fabio González in a 0–1 home loss against Real Zaragoza.

On 11 August 2020, Haro joined Real Murcia in the third division.
