= Domingos Duarte =

Portuguese footballer

Personal information
- Full name: Domingos de Sousa Coutinho Meneses Duarte
- Date of birth: 10 March 1995 (age 31)
- Place of birth: Cascais, Portugal
- Height: 1.92 m (6 ft 4 in)
- Position: Centre-back

Team information
- Current team: São Paulo
- Number: 22

Youth career
- 2004–2011: Estoril
- 2011–2014: Sporting CP

Senior career*
Years	Team	Apps	(Gls)
2014–2016	Sporting CP B	54	(3)
2016–2019	Sporting CP	0	(0)
2016–2017	→ Belenenses (loan)	28	(1)
2017–2018	→ Chaves (loan)	30	(0)
2018–2019	→ Deportivo La Coruña (loan)	39	(4)
2019–2022	Granada	86	(5)
2022–2026	Getafe	102	(2)
2026–	São Paulo	0	(0)

International career
2013–2014	Portugal U19	15	(1)
2014–2015	Portugal U20	10	(0)
2017	Portugal U21	1	(0)
2020–2021	Portugal	3	(0)
- * Club domestic league appearances and goals as of 27 May 2026

Domingos de Sousa Coutinho Meneses Duarte (born 10 March 1995) is a Portuguese professional footballer who plays as a centre-back for Campeonato Brasileiro Série A club São Paulo.

Developed at Sporting CP, where he was only a reserve, he played in the Primeira Liga on loan at Belenenses and Chaves. He went on to make 188 La Liga appearances for Granada and Getafe, having signed with the former club in July 2019.

Duarte made his full debut for Portugal in 2020.

== Club career ==
=== Sporting CP ===
Born in Cascais, Lisbon District, Duarte joined Sporting CP's youth academy at the age of 16. He spent two full seasons with their reserves in the Segunda Liga to kickstart his senior career, his first match in the competition occurring on 5 October 2014 when he played 90 minutes in the 2–1 home win against C.D. Trofense.

Duarte served loan spells from 2016 to 2018, respectively at C.F. Os Belenenses and G.D. Chaves and with both clubs competing in the Primeira Liga. He made his league debut on 14 August 2016 while at the service of the former in a 2–0 away loss to Vitória de Setúbal, and scored his first goal on 1 October of the same year in a 3–1 defeat at Chaves.

On 3 August 2018, still owned by Sporting, Duarte signed with Deportivo de La Coruña with an option to buy. He scored in his very first appearance in the Spanish Segunda División, helping the visitors to earn a point at Albacete Balompié after the 1–1 draw.

=== Granada ===
On 14 July 2019, Duarte joined recently-promoted Granada CF on a four-year deal for a €3 million fee, with Sporting keeping 25% of future sale rights. He made his La Liga debut on 17 August, playing the entire 4–4 away draw against Villarreal CF, and scored his first goal on 5 October in a 4–2 loss away to Real Madrid.

Duarte started in ten of his 11 appearances in the 2020–21 UEFA Europa League, as his team reached the quarter-finals. On 20 September 2021, he headed home in the first half of an eventual 1–1 away draw with FC Barcelona.

=== Getafe ===
On 11 July 2022, following Granada's relegation, Duarte remained in the Spanish top division after signing a four-year contract with Getafe CF. He made his debut on 15 August in a 3–0 home loss to Atlético Madrid in the first game of the season.

Duarte scored his first goal on 1 November 2023, in a 12–0 away demolition of amateurs CF Tardienta in the first round of the Copa del Rey. His first in the league came on 6 April 2025, when he closed the 4–0 victory at Real Valladolid.

=== São Paulo ===
On 6 August 2026, Duarte joined Campeonato Brasileiro Série A club São Paulo FC on a two-year deal, as a free agent.

== International career ==
Duarte won his only cap for the Portugal under-21 side on 24 March 2017, when he featured 11 minutes in a 3–1 friendly win over Norway in Estoril. In November 2019, manager Fernando Santos called him up for the first time to the senior team ahead of UEFA Euro 2020 qualifiers against Luxembourg and Lithuania.

On 11 November 2020, Duarte made his full debut, in a 7–0 rout of Andorra in another exhibition at the Estádio da Luz. In October 2022, he was included in a preliminary 55-man squad for the 2022 FIFA World Cup in Qatar.

== Career statistics ==
=== Club ===
As of match played 16 March 2024

Appearances and goals by club, season and competition
Club	Season	League			National cup		League cup		Continental		Other		Total	
Club	Season	Division	Apps	Goals	Apps	Goals	Apps	Goals	Apps	Goals	Apps	Goals	Apps	Goals
Sporting CP B	2014–15	Segunda Liga	10	0	—		—		—		—		10	0
Sporting CP B	2015–16	LigaPro	44	3	—		—		—		—		44	3
Sporting CP B	Total		54	3	0	0	0	0	0	0	0	0	54	3
Belenenses (loan)	2016–17	Primeira Liga	28	1	0	0	3	0	—		—		31	1
Chaves (loan)	2017–18	Primeira Liga	30	0	1	0	1	0	—		—		32	0
Deportivo La Coruña (loan)	2018–19	Segunda División	39	4	0	0	—		—		4 (Note: Appearances in La Liga play-offs)	0	43	4
Granada	2019–20	La Liga	36	3	3	0	—		—		—		39	3
Granada	2020–21	La Liga	29	1	2	0	—		11 (Note: Appearances in UEFA Europa League)	0	—		42	1
Granada	2021–22	La Liga	21	1	0	0	—		—		—		21	1
Granada	Total		86	5	5	0	4	0	11	0	0	0	102	5
Getafe	2022–23	La Liga	31	0	3	0	—		—		—		34	0
Getafe	2023–24	La Liga	15	0	2	1	—		—		—		17	1
Getafe	Total		46	0	5	1	0	0	0	0	0	0	51	1
Career total			283	13	11	1	4	0	11	0	4	0	313	14

=== International ===
Appearances and goals by national team and year
National team	Year	Apps	Goals
Portugal	2020	1	0
Portugal	2021	2	0
Total		3	0

== Honours ==
Individual

- UEFA European Under-19 Championship Team of the Tournament: 2014
