= Josín =

Spanish footballer

Personal information
- Full name: José Antonio Martínez Álvarez
- Date of birth: 29 July 1997 (age 29)
- Place of birth: Oviedo, Spain
- Height: 1.80 m (5 ft 11 in)
- Position: Centre back

Youth career
- Oviedo

Senior career*
Years	Team	Apps	(Gls)
2015–2020	Oviedo B	110	(3)
2016–2019	Oviedo	1	(0)
2020–2021	Guijuelo	21	(0)
2021–2023	Cacereño	56	(0)
2023–2024	SS Reyes	20	(0)
2024–2025	Avilés Industrial	30	(1)
- * Club domestic league appearances and goals as of 15 June 2025

José Antonio Martínez Álvarez (born 29 July 1997), commonly known as Josín, is a Spanish footballer who plays as a central defender.

== Club career ==
Born in Oviedo, Asturias, Josín was a Real Oviedo youth graduate. He made his senior debut with the reserves on 10 May 2015, aged only 17, starting in a 1–0 away win against Atlético de Lugones SD in the Tercera División.

Despite being still registered with the Juvenil squad, Josín was called up to the first team for a Segunda División match against UE Llagostera on 6 May 2016. He only made his professional debut on 4 June, coming on as a second-half substitute for Josete in a 0–5 away loss against CA Osasuna; he was also sent off after one minute on the field after conceding a penalty.

Josín scored his first senior goal on 17 September 2016, netting the game's only in a home success over CD Tineo.
