= Álex Prendes =

Spanish footballer

Personal information
- Full name: Alejandro Prendes Reina
- Date of birth: 12 April 1997 (age 29)
- Place of birth: Avilés, Spain
- Height: 1.88 m (6 ft 2 in)
- Position: Centre back

Team information
- Current team: Barakaldo
- Number: 22

Youth career
- Veriña
- 2015–2016: Oviedo

Senior career*
Years	Team	Apps	(Gls)
2016–2019	Oviedo B	64	(1)
2017	Oviedo	0	(0)
2019	Almería B	1	(0)
2019–2020	Gimnástica Torrelavega	7	(1)
2020–	Barakaldo	4	(0)
- * Club domestic league appearances and goals as of 20:39, 16 February 2020 (UTC)

Alejandro "Álex" Prendes Reina (born 12 April 1997) is a Spanish footballer who plays for Barakaldo CF as a central defender.

== Club career ==
Born in Avilés, Asturias, Prendes joined Real Oviedo's youth setup in 2015, from Veriña CF. He made his senior debut with the reserves during the 2015–16 campaign, in Tercera División.

Prendes made his first team debut on 6 September 2017, starting in a 0–1 home loss against CD Numancia, for the season's Copa del Rey. He continued to appear exclusively with the B's, however.

In July 2019, Prendes moved to another reserve team, UD Almería B in the fourth tier.
