= Luis Milla (footballer, born 1994) =

Spanish footballer (born 1994)

Personal information
- Full name: Luis Milla Manzanares
- Date of birth: 7 October 1994 (age 32)
- Place of birth: Madrid, Spain
- Height: 1.75 m (5 ft 9 in)
- Position: Central midfielder

Team information
- Current team: Como
- Number: 6

Youth career
- Rayo Majadahonda
- 2012–2013: Atlético Madrid

Senior career*
Years	Team	Apps	(Gls)
2013–2014	Atlético Madrid C	4	(0)
2014	→ SS Reyes (loan)	18	(2)
2014–2015	Rayo Vallecano B	20	(2)
2015–2017	Alcorcón	0	(0)
2015–2016	→ Guijuelo (loan)	4	(1)
2016–2017	→ Fuenlabrada (loan)	33	(1)
2017–2018	Fuenlabrada	21	(3)
2018–2020	Tenerife	90	(10)
2020–2022	Granada	50	(4)
2022–2026	Getafe	124	(2)
2026–	Como	10	(0)
- * Club domestic league appearances and goals as of 08:17, 5 November 2026 (UTC)

Luis Milla Manzanares (born 7 October 1994) is a Spanish professional footballer who plays as a central midfielder for Serie A club Como.

== Club career ==
=== Early career ===
Born in Madrid, Milla joined Atlético Madrid's youth setup in June 2012, from Rayo Majadahonda. He made his senior debut with the C-team in Tercera División during the 2013–14 season, before being loaned out to fellow league team SS Reyes on 17 January 2014.

In July 2014, Milla signed for another reserve team, Rayo Vallecano B in Segunda División B. The following 7 August he signed for Segunda División side Alcorcón, being immediately loaned to Guijelo in the third division for one year.

In September 2015, Milla suffered a severe knee injury, returning to action seven months later. On 17 July of the following year, he moved to fellow third division side Fuenlabrada, also in a temporary deal.

On 11 July 2017, free agent Milla signed a permanent four-year contract with Fuenlabrada. On 28 November, he scored the opener in a 2–2 draw against Real Madrid at the Santiago Bernabéu, scoring in the stadium 24 years after his father's last goal.

=== Tenerife ===
On 19 January 2018, Milla signed a four-and-a-half-year contract with Tenerife in the Segunda División. He made his professional debut nine days later, playing the full 90 minutes in a 0–0 home draw against Real Valladolid.

Milla scored his first professional goal on 27 October 2018, netting the equalizer in a 3–2 home win against Alcorcón. On 24 June 2020, he scored a brace in a 4–1 home routing of Mirandés.

=== Granada ===
On 31 July 2020, Milla signed a four-year contract with La Liga side Granada. On 12 September, he marked his competitive debut for his new club and his first appearance in the top division of Spanish football by scoring a goal with a shot from the edge of the area, in a 2–0 victory over Athletic Bilbao.

=== Getafe ===
On 25 July 2022, after Granada's relegation, Milla signed a five-year deal with Getafe in the top tier. He was an undisputed starter for the club during his spell, featuring in at least 30 matches per season.

=== Como ===
On 2 July 2026, Milla moved abroad for the first time in his career, signing a three-year contract with Serie A side Como.

== Personal life ==
Milla's father, also named Luis, was also a footballer and a midfielder. A Barcelona youth graduate, he also represented Real Madrid, Valencia and the Spanish national team, before later working as a manager.

== Career statistics ==
=== Club ===
As of match played 4 November 2026

Appearances and goals by club, season and competition
Club	Season	League			National cup		Continental		Other		Total	
Club	Season	Division	Apps	Goals	Apps	Goals	Apps	Goals	Apps	Goals	Apps	Goals
Rayo Vallecano B	2014–15	Segunda División B	20	2	—		—		—		20	2
Guijuelo (loan)	2015–16	Segunda División B	4	1	1	1	—		—		5	2
Fuenlabrada (loan)	2016–17	Segunda División B	33	1	0	0	—		2 (Note: Appearance(s) in Promotion Playoffs)	0	35	1
Fuenlabrada	2017–18	Segunda División B	21	3	4	1	—		—		25	4
Tenerife	2017–18	Segunda División	17	0	0	0	—		—		17	0
Tenerife	2018–19	Segunda División	38	2	1	0	—		—		39	2
Tenerife	2019–20	Segunda División	35	8	4	0	—		—		39	8
Tenerife	Total		90	10	5	0	0	0	2	0	95	0
Granada	2020–21	La Liga	16	1	1	0	7 (Note: Appearance(s) in UEFA Europa League)	0	—		24	1
Granada	2021–22	La Liga	34	3	2	0	—		—		36	3
Granada	Total		50	4	3	0	7	0	0	0	60	4
Getafe	2022–23	La Liga	27	0	3	0	—		—		30	0
Getafe	2023–24	La Liga	27	0	3	1	—		—		30	1
Getafe	2024–25	La Liga	33	1	3	0	—		—		36	1
Getafe	2025–26	La Liga	37	1	1	0	—		—		38	1
Getafe	Total		124	2	10	1	0	0	0	0	134	3
Como	2026–27	Serie A	10	0	0	0	4 (Note: Appearance(s) in UEFA Champions League)	0	—		14	0
Career total			352	23	23	3	11	0	2	0	388	26
