= Ramón Folch (footballer) =

Spanish footballer

Personal information
- Full name: Ramón Folch Frigola
- Date of birth: 4 October 1989 (age 37)
- Place of birth: Reus, Spain
- Height: 1.81 m (5 ft 11 1/2 in)
- Position: Midfielder

Team information
- Current team: Reus FCR
- Number: 8

Youth career
- 1999–2001: Reus
- 2001–2002: Gimnàstic
- 2002–2006: Reus
- 2006–2007: Roda Barà

Senior career*
Years	Team	Apps	(Gls)
2007–2008	Roda Barà		
2008–2009	Vilafranca	12	(0)
2009–2010	Cambrils		
2010–2012	Amposta	59	(5)
2012–2013	Conquense	34	(5)
2013–2017	Reus	135	(8)
2017–2019	Oviedo	75	(2)
2019–2021	Elche	34	(1)
2020–2021	→ Tenerife (loan)	24	(1)
2021–2022	Sabadell	5	(0)
2022–2023	Cornellà	27	(0)
2023–	Reus FCR	72	(13)
- * Club domestic league appearances and goals as of 7 May 2026

Ramón Folch Frigola (born 4 October 1989) is a Spanish professional footballer who plays as a central midfielder for Segunda Federación club Reus FC Reddis.

== Club career ==
Born in Reus, Tarragona, Catalonia, Folch made his senior debut with local CA Roda de Barà in the Primera Catalana. In the 2008 summer he signed for fellow league team FC Vilafranca, and represented FC Cambrils the following campaign.

In July 2010, Folch joined Tercera División side CF Amposta. After being a regular starter, he moved to UB Conquense in July 2012, and achieved promotion to Segunda División B at the end of the season.

On 11 July 2013, Folch agreed to a contract with CF Reus Deportiu, a club he already represented as a youth. He renewed his contract on 14 June of the following year, and contributed with 38 appearances during the 2015–16 campaign as his side was promoted to Segunda División for the first time ever.

Folch made his professional debut on 20 August, starting in a 1–0 away win against RCD Mallorca. He scored his first professional goal on 25 September, netting the first in a 1–1 home draw against Rayo Vallecano.

On 26 November 2016, Folch scored a brace in a 2–2 draw at Real Zaragoza. The following 30 June, he signed a two-year contract with fellow second tier club Real Oviedo.

On 1 July 2019, Folch agreed to a deal with Elche CF also in the second division. He contributed with one goal in 36 appearances (play-offs included) in his first season, as his side achieved promotion to La Liga.

Folch made his top tier debut at the age of 30 on 30 September 2020, replacing Raúl Guti late into a 1–0 away win against SD Eibar. Six days later, however, he was loaned to second division side CD Tenerife for the 2020–21 campaign.
