= Joselu (footballer, born 1991) =

Spanish footballer (born 1991)

Personal information
- Full name: José Luis Moreno Barroso
- Date of birth: 3 March 1991 (age 35)
- Place of birth: Cartaya, Spain
- Height: 1.77 m (5 ft 10 in)
- Position: Forward

Youth career
- San Sebastián Cepsa
- Villarreal

Senior career*
Years	Team	Apps	(Gls)
2009–2011	Villarreal C	?	(46)
2010–2012	Villarreal B	36	(12)
2011–2013	Villarreal	11	(0)
2012–2013	→ Córdoba (loan)	26	(3)
2013–2015	Recreativo	55	(10)
2015	Mallorca	19	(2)
2015–2017	Lugo	59	(28)
2017–2018	Granada	41	(9)
2018–2020	Oviedo	45	(10)
2020	→ Tenerife (loan)	17	(2)
2020–2022	Tenerife	22	(0)
2021–2022	→ Lugo (loan)	10	(2)
2023	Lugo	1	(0)
Total		342+	(124)
- * Club domestic league appearances and goals

José Luis Moreno Barroso (born 3 March 1991), commonly known as Joselu, is a Spanish former professional footballer who played as a forward.

A youth proponent of Villarreal, where he played one La Liga season, he spent most of his career in the Segunda División, in service of eight clubs.

== Club career ==
=== Villarreal ===
Born in Cartaya, Province of Huelva, Joselu came through the ranks of Villarreal CF, and made his senior debut for their third team. He first appeared at the professional level on 12 June 2010, in the reserves' penultimate game of the season, as a half-time substitute in a 1–0 away loss against CD Numancia. He scored his first goal roughly one year later, opening a 2–1 defeat at Real Betis also in the Segunda División.

Joselu netted 11 times in 29 matches the following campaign, including a hat-trick on 30 September 2011 in a 3–2 home win over Gimnàstic de Tarragona. The team was eventually relegated due to the descent of their parent club, and he made 16 competitive appearances for the latter – mostly from the bench – that year, including in the UEFA Champions League. His debut was a goalless La Liga draw away to Getafe CF, replacing Jonathan de Guzmán for the final four minutes.

=== Later career ===
Joselu was loaned to Córdoba CF on 23 June 2012, ahead of the upcoming season. He remained in his native Andalusia and the second division a year later, signing a three-year deal with the option of a fourth at Recreativo de Huelva.

In January 2015, with Recre in serious financial problems halfway through a season that would end with relegation, Joselu transferred to RCD Mallorca for a year and the option of a second. He remained there only until August, when he was signed by fellow division two side CD Lugo.

On 14 June 2017, after being crowned top scorer of the second tier with 23 goals, Joselu agreed to a three-year contract with Granada CF, recently relegated from the top flight. On 13 August of the following year, he moved to Real Oviedo of the same league on a four-year deal.

Joselu joined CD Tenerife on 17 January 2020, on loan for the remainder of the season with an option to a permanent deal. This clause was activated on 2 July, but the player returned to Lugo on a one-year deal on 9 August 2021, after a goalless campaign.

On 2 January 2023, after six months without a club, Joselu returned to Lugo for a third spell, signing until the end of the season. He retired six months later, due to injuries.

== Personal life ==
Joselu's younger brother, Simón, was also a footballer and a forward. He too came through Villarreal's system.

== Honours ==
Individual

- Segunda División top scorer: 2016–17
- Segunda División Player of the Month: September 2016
