= Diego Johannesson =

Icelandic footballer (born 1993)

Diegui Johannesson
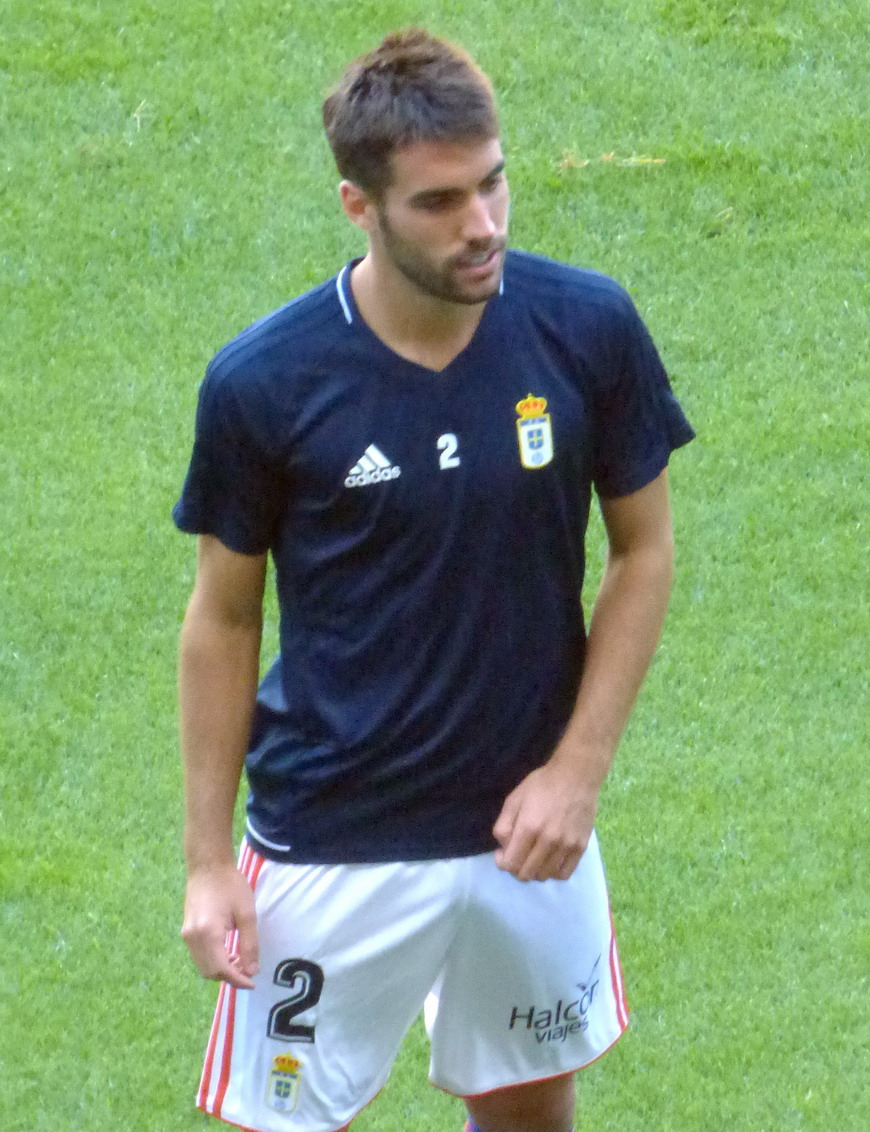
- Johannesson with Real Oviedo in 2017

Personal information
- Full name: Diego Johannesson Pando
- Date of birth: 3 October 1993 (age 33)
- Place of birth: Villaviciosa, Spain
- Height: 1.72 m (5 ft 8 in)
- Position: Right-back

Youth career
- Laviada
- 2001–2006: Sporting Gijón
- 2006–2011: Llano 2000
- 2011–2013: Oviedo

Senior career*
Years	Team	Apps	(Gls)
2012–2015	Oviedo B	85	(5)
2014–2021	Oviedo	126	(7)
2020	→ Cartagena (loan)	8	(0)
2021–2024	Albacete	26	(0)

International career
2016–2017	Iceland	3	(0)
- * Club domestic league appearances and goals as of 11 July 2023

Diego "Diegui" Johannesson Pando (born 3 October 1993) is a professional footballer who plays as a right-back.

== Club career ==
Born in Villaviciosa, Asturias to an Icelandic father and a Spanish mother, Johannesson joined Real Oviedo's youth setup in the 2011 summer, after spells at SD Llano 2000 and Sporting de Gijón. He made his debuts as a senior with the reserves in 2012, in Tercera División.

Initially a right winger, Johannesson was converted to a right back during the 2013–14 season. On 3 September 2014, he made his first team debut, starting in a 4–0 Copa del Rey home routing of SD Amorebieta.

Johannesson appeared in 13 first team matches during the campaign, as his side was promoted as champions. He made his professional debut on 25 October 2015, coming on as a second-half substitute for José Manuel Fernández in a 2–4 Segunda División away loss against SD Ponferradina.

On 4 July 2017, after already becoming a full-time member of the first team squad, Johannesson renewed his contract until 2019. A regular starter in the following two campaigns, he lost his first-choice status after the arrival of Juanjo Nieto in 2019.

On 10 January 2020, Johannesson went on loan to FC Cartagena for the remainder of the season. He helped the team in their promotion to the second division before returning to Oviedo, where he was again a backup option.

On 14 June 2021, Johannesson signed a two-year contract with Albacete Balompié, freshly relegated to Primera División RFEF.

== International career ==
On 10 December 2014, Johannesson committed himself to Iceland, after stating that he would "dream of playing with its national team". On 25 January 2016, he received his first call up, being included in Lars Lagerbäck and Heimir Hallgrímsson's squad for a friendly against the United States.

Johannesson made his full international debut on 31 January 2016, replacing Guðmundur Þórarinsson at half-time in a 2–3 loss to the U.S. at the StubHub Center in Carson, California.

== Honours ==
- Segunda División B: 2014–15
