= Dani Sandoval =

Spanish footballer

Personal information
- Full name: Daniel Sandoval Fernández
- Date of birth: 16 February 1998 (age 28)
- Place of birth: Gijón, Spain
- Height: 1.78 m (5 ft 10 in)
- Position: Winger

Team information
- Current team: Mérida

Youth career
- Roces
- 2015–2017: Oviedo

Senior career*
Years	Team	Apps	(Gls)
2017–2019	Oviedo B	51	(5)
2019–2020	Levante B	16	(1)
2020–2021	Murcia	7	(1)
2021	Oviedo B	15	(1)
2021	Oviedo	1	(0)
2021–2022	SD Logroñés	34	(5)
2022–2024	Mérida	64	(12)
2024–2025	Wieczysta Kraków	34	(6)
2024–2025	Wieczysta Kraków II	5	(0)
2026	GKS Tychy	3	(0)
2026–	Mérida	0	(0)
- * Club domestic league appearances and goals as of 15:40, 26 May 2026 (UTC)

Daniel "Dani" Sandoval Fernández (born 16 February 1998) is a Spanish professional footballer who plays as a left winger for Primera Federación club Mérida.

== Club career ==
Born in Gijón, Asturias, Sandoval joined Real Oviedo's youth setup in 2015, from TSK Roces. He made his senior debut with the reserves on 25 February 2017, coming on as a second-half substitute in a 2–0 Tercera División home win against Atlético de Lugones SD.

Sandoval contributed with four goals in 26 appearances during the 2017–18 season, helping the B-side in their promotion to Segunda División B. On 13 July 2019, he signed a two-year deal with another reserve team, Atlético Levante UD also in the third division.

On 3 October 2020, Sandoval signed for fellow third division side Real Murcia. The following 29 January, however, he returned to Oviedo and their B-team in the same category.

Sandoval made his professional debut with Oviedo on 29 May 2021, replacing Marco Sangalli late into a 2–2 away draw against CD Tenerife in the Segunda División championship.

After stints with SD Logroñés and Mérida, Sandoval was announced as the new signing of Polish third-tier club Wieczysta Kraków on 3 June 2024. He signed a two-year contract with an extension option, effective from July that year.

On 12 December 2025, Sandoval and Wieczysta agreed to part ways. Three days later, he signed with Polish second division side GKS Tychy on a deal until June 2027.

After GKS Tychy's relegation to the II liga, Sandoval moved back to Spain. On 26 June 2026, he re-joined Mérida.
