= 2018–19 Getafe CF season =

Getafe CF
2018–19 season
- President: Ángel Torres
- Head coach: José Bordalás
- Stadium: Coliseum Alfonso Pérez
- La Liga: 5th
- Copa del Rey: Quarter-finals
- Top goalscorer: League: Jaime Mata (14); All: Jaime Mata (16)
Home colours	Away colours	Third colours

During the 2018–19 season, Getafe CF participated in La Liga and the Copa del Rey. The season covered a period from 1 July 2018 to 30 June 2019.

== Players ==
=== First-team squad ===
As of 1 September 2018

Note: Flags indicate national team as defined under FIFA eligibility rules; some limited exceptions apply. Players may hold more than one non-FIFA nationality.

No.	Pos.	Nation	Player
1	GK	ARG	Leandro Chichizola
2	DF	TOG	Djené
3	DF	POR	Vitorino Antunes
4	DF	ESP	Bruno (vice-captain)
5	MF	ESP	Markel Bergara
6	DF	URU	Leandro Cabrera
7	FW	ESP	Jaime Mata
8	MF	ESP	Francisco Portillo
9	FW	ESP	Ángel
10	MF	JPN	Gaku Shibasaki
11	FW	SEN	Amath
13	GK	ESP	David Soria

No.	Pos.	Nation	Player
14	FW	ESP	Sergi Guardiola (on loan from Córdoba)
15	MF	URU	Sebastián Cristóforo (on loan from Fiorentina)
17	MF	ESP	Rober
18	MF	URU	Mauro Arambarri
19	FW	ESP	Jorge Molina (captain)
20	MF	SRB	Nemanja Maksimović
21	DF	ESP	Ignasi Miquel
22	DF	URU	Damián Suárez
23	MF	ESP	Iván Alejo
24	DF	FRA	Dimitri Foulquier (on loan from Watford)
25	GK	ESP	Rubén Yáñez

=== Reserve team ===
Note: Flags indicate national team as defined under FIFA eligibility rules; some limited exceptions apply. Players may hold more than one non-FIFA nationality.

No.	Pos.	Nation	Player
30	FW	ESP	Hugo Duro
34	MF	SEN	Pape Assane
36	DF	ESP	Alberto Redondo

No.	Pos.	Nation	Player
37	DF	ESP	Miguel Ángel
38	DF	ESP	David Alba

=== Out on loan ===
Note: Flags indicate national team as defined under FIFA eligibility rules; some limited exceptions apply. Players may hold more than one non-FIFA nationality.

No.	Pos.	Nation	Player
—	GK	SRB	Filip Manojlović (at Panionios until 30 June 2019)
—	DF	URU	Mathías Olivera (at Albacete until 30 June 2019)
—	MF	ESP	Álvaro Jiménez (at Sporting Gijón until 30 June 2019)

No.	Pos.	Nation	Player
—	MF	ESP	José Carlos Lazo (at Lugo until 30 June 2019)
—	MF	CGO	Merveil Ndockyt (at Mallorca until 30 June 2019)
—	FW	ESP	Chuli (at Extremadura until 30 June 2019)

== Transfers ==
=== In ===
Date	Player	From	Type	Fee	Ref
20 May 2018	(Mexico) Oswaldo Alanís	(Mexico) Guadalajara	Transfer	Free	
29 May 2018	(Spain) Alberto García	(Spain) Rayo Vallecano	Loan return		
8 June 2018	(Argentina) Emi Buendía	(Spain) Cultural Leonesa	Loan return		
11 June 2018	(Portugal) Vitorino Antunes	(Ukraine) Dynamo Kyiv	Transfer	€2,500,000	
11 June 2018	(Uruguay) Mauro Arambarri	(Uruguay) Boston River	Transfer	€2,000,000	
22 June 2018	(Spain) Sergi Guardiola	(Spain) Córdoba	Loan		
27 June 2018	(Spain) Markel Bergara	(Spain) Real Sociedad	Transfer	Free	
30 June 2018	(Spain) Chuli	(Spain) Lugo	Loan return		
30 June 2018	(Spain) Rober	(Spain) Osasuna	Loan return		
30 June 2018	(Spain) Rubén Yáñez	(Spain) Cádiz	Loan return		
30 June 2018	(France) Karim Yoda	(Spain) Reus	Loan return		
2 July 2018	(Spain) Jaime Mata	(Spain) Valladolid	Transfer	Free	
4 July 2018	(Argentina) Leandro Chichizola	(Spain) Las Palmas	Transfer	Free	
6 July 2018	(Morocco) Ayoub Abou	(Spain) Rayo Majadahonda	Transfer	Free	
7 July 2018	(Uruguay) Leandro Cabrera	(Italy) Crotone	Transfer	€605,000	
13 July 2018	(Spain) José Carlos Lazo	(Spain) Real Madrid Castilla	Transfer	Free	
13 July 2018	(Spain) David Soria	(Spain) Sevilla	Transfer	€3,000,000	
16 July 2018	(Serbia) Nemanja Maksimović	(Spain) Valencia	Transfer	€5,000,000	
26 July 2018	(Spain) Iván Alejo	(Spain) Eibar	Transfer	€4,000,000	
4 August 2018	(Spain) Ignasi Miquel	(Spain) Málaga	Transfer	€3,500,000	
23 August 2018	(France) Dimitri Foulquier	(England) Watford	Loan		
31 August 2018	(Uruguay) Sebastián Cristóforo	(Italy) Fiorentina	Loan		

=== Out ===
Date	Player	To	Type	Fee	Ref
29 May 2018	(Spain) Alberto García	(Spain) Rayo Vallecano	Transfer	Free	
8 June 2018	(Argentina) Emi Buendía	(England) Norwich City	Transfer	£1,300,000	
11 June 2018	(Portugal) Vitorino Antunes	(Ukraine) Dynamo Kyiv	Loan return		
11 June 2018	(Uruguay) Mauro Arambarri	(Uruguay) Boston River	Loan return		
25 June 2018	(Spain) Francisco Molinero	(Spain) Sporting Gijón	Transfer	Free	
27 June 2018	(Spain) Markel Bergara	(Spain) Real Sociedad	Loan return		
30 June 2018	(Uruguay) Leandro Cabrera	(Italy) Crotone	Loan return		
30 June 2018	(France) Mathieu Flamini	TBD		Free	
30 June 2018	(Argentina) Emiliano Martínez	(England) Arsenal	Loan return		
30 June 2018	(Spain) Sergio Mora	TBD		Free	
30 June 2018	(France) Loïc Rémy	(Spain) Las Palmas	Loan return		
1 July 2018	(Spain) Vicente Guaita	(England) Crystal Palace	Transfer	Free	
4 July 2018	(Uruguay) Mathías Olivera	(Spain) Albacete	Loan		
26 July 2018	(Serbia) Filip Manojlović	(Greece) Panionios	Loan		
31 July 2018	(France) Karim Yoda	(Spain) Reus	Transfer	Free	
2 August 2018	(Morocco) Ayoub Abou	(Spain) Real Madrid Castilla	Transfer	Free	
3 August 2018	(Morocco) Fayçal Fajr	(France) Caen	Transfer	€1,500,000	
6 August 2018	(Spain) José Carlos Lazo	(Spain) Lugo	Loan		
14 August 2018	(Spain) Chuli	(Spain) Extremadura	Loan		
15 August 2018	(Spain) Dani Pacheco	(Spain) Málaga	Transfer	Free	
22 August 2018	(Spain) Álvaro Jiménez	(Spain) Sporting Gijón	Loan		
23 August 2018	(Democratic Republic of the Congo) Merveille Ndockyt	(Spain) Mallorca	Loan		
28 August 2018	(Mexico) Oswaldo Alanís	(Spain) Oviedo	Transfer	Free	

== Competitions ==
=== Overall ===
Competition	First match	Last match	Starting round	Final position	Record							
Competition	First match	Last match	Starting round	Final position	Pld	W	D	L	GF	GA	GD	Win %
La Liga	19 August 2018	19 May 2019	Matchday 1	5th	38	15	14	9	48	35	+13	39.47
Copa del Rey	31 October 2018	29 January 2019	Round of 32	Quarter-finals	6	4	1	1	11	6	+5	66.67
Total					44	19	15	10	59	41	+18	43.18

Last updated: 18 May 2019
Source: Competitions

=== La Liga ===
==== League table ====
Pos	Team	Pld	W	D	L	GF	GA	GD	Pts	Qualification or relegation
3	Real Madrid	38	21	5	12	63	46	+17	68	Qualification for the Champions League group stage
4	Valencia	38	15	16	7	51	35	+16	61	Qualification for the Champions League group stage
5	Getafe	38	15	14	9	48	35	+13	59 (Note: Getafe finished ahead of Sevilla on head-to-head points: Sevilla 0–2 Getafe, Getafe 3–0 Sevilla.)	Qualification for the Europa League group stage (Note: Since the winners of the 2018–19 Copa del Rey, Valencia, qualified for European competition based on league position, the spot awarded to the cup winners (Europa League group stage) was passed to the sixth-placed team and the spot awarded to the sixth-placed team (Europa League second qualifying round) was passed to the seventh-placed team.)
6	Sevilla	38	17	8	13	62	47	+15	59	Qualification for the Europa League group stage
7	Espanyol	38	14	11	13	48	50	−2	53 (Note: Espanyol finished ahead of Athletic Bilbao on head-to-head points: Espanyol 1–0 Athletic Bilbao, Athletic Bilbao 1–1 Espanyol.)	Qualification for the Europa League second qualifying round

Source: La Liga, Soccerway
Rules for classification: 1) Points; 2) Head-to-head points; 3) Head-to-head goal difference; 4) Goal difference; 5) Goals scored; 6) Fair-play points (Note: Head-to-head record is used only after all the matches between the teams in question have been played)

==== Results summary ====
Overall								Home						Away					
Pld	W	D	L	GF	GA	GD	Pts	W	D	L	GF	GA	GD	W	D	L	GF	GA	GD
38	15	14	9	48	35	+13	59	11	3	5	28	13	+15	4	11	4	20	22	−2

Last updated: 18 May 2019.
Source: Competitive matches

==== Results by round ====
Round	1	2	3	4	5	6	7	8	9	10	11	12	13	14	15	16	17	18	19	20	21	22	23	24	25	26	27	28	29	30	31	32	33	34	35	36	37	38
Ground	A	H	H	A	H	A	A	H	A	H	A	H	A	H	A	H	A	H	A	H	A	A	H	A	H	A	H	A	H	A	H	A	H	H	A	H	A	H
Result	L	W	D	W	L	D	D	L	W	W	D	L	D	W	D	W	D	L	W	W	L	D	W	D	W	W	W	D	L	D	W	D	W	D	L	W	L	D
Position	17	11	9	5	10	11	9	13	9	8	8	11	12	9	8	7	7	7	6	6	6	5	5	5	4	4	4	4	4	4	4	5	4	4	4	4	4	5

Updated to match(es) played on 18 May 2019. Source: Competitive matches
A = Away; H = Home; W = Win; D = Draw; L = Loss

==== Matches ====
Win Draw Loss Fixtures

19 August 2018 1	Real Madrid	2–0	Getafe	Madrid
22:15 CEST (UTC+02:00)	Carvajal 20'; Bale 51'; Marcelo (yellow card) 68'	Report	Molina (yellow card) 27'; Amath (yellow card) 41'; Djené (yellow card) 42'; Mata (yellow card) 63'; Arambarri (yellow card) 77'; Bruno (yellow card) 79'; Cabrera (yellow card) 79'	Stadium: Santiago Bernabéu; Attendance: 48,346; Referee: Xavier Estrada Fernández

24 August 2018 2	Getafe	2–0	Eibar	Getafe
20:15 CEST (UTC+02:00)	Djené (yellow card) 1'; Ángel 18'; Alejo (yellow card) 46'; Molina 90'	Report	Arbilla (yellow card) 90+1'	Stadium: Coliseum Alfonso Pérez; Attendance: 7,600; Referee: David Medié Jiménez

31 August 2018 3	Getafe	0–0	Valladolid	Getafe
20:00 CEST (UTC+2)	Portillo (yellow card) 15'; Alejo (yellow card) 42'; Djené (yellow card) 89'	Report	Moyano (yellow card) 40'	Stadium: Coliseum Alfonso Pérez; Attendance: 9,564; Referee: Adrián Cordero Vega

16 September 2018 4	Sevilla	0–2	Getafe	Seville
20:45 CEST (UTC+02:00)	Mesa (yellow card) 14'; Navas (yellow card) 21'; Banega (yellow card) 69'	Report	Ángel 3', 38'; Cabrera (yellow card) 16'; Djené (yellow card) 19'; Antunes (yellow card) 21'; Amath (yellow card) 45'; Bruno (yellow card) 70'; Foulquier (yellow card) 76'	Stadium: Ramón Sánchez Pizjuán; Attendance: 36,943; Referee: Ricardo de Burgos Bengoetxea

22 September 2018 5	Getafe	0–2	Atlético Madrid	Getafe
18:30 CEST (UTC+02:00)	Suárez (yellow card) 56'; Alejo (red card) 67'	Report	Soria 14' (o.g.); Lemar 60'; Saúl (yellow card) 82'; Juanfran (yellow card) 84'	Stadium: Coliseum Alfonso Pérez; Attendance: 12,756; Referee: José María Sánchez Martínez

27 September 2018 6	Alavés	1–1	Getafe	Vitoria-Gasteiz
20:00 CEST (UTC+02:00)	Wakaso (yellow card) 44'; Jony (yellow card) 82'; M. García (yellow card) 82'; Brašanac (yellow card) 89'; Calleri 90+3'	Report	Arambarri (yellow card) 75'; Amath 80'; Cabrera (yellow card) 90+5'	Stadium: Mendizorrotza; Attendance: 13,794; Referee: Eduardo Prieto Iglesias

1 October 2018 7	Celta Vigo	1–1	Getafe	Vigo
21:00 CEST (UTC+02:00)	Gómez 33'; Aspas (yellow card) 82'; Mallo (yellow card) 90+1'	Report	Bruno (yellow card) 20'; Mata 78'; Portillo (yellow card) 82'	Stadium: Abanca-Balaídos; Attendance: 14,474; Referee: Guillermo Cuadra Fernández

6 October 2018 8	Getafe	0–1	Levante	Getafe
16:15 CEST (UTC+02:00)	Djené (yellow card) 13'; Antunes (yellow card) 26'; Portillo (red card) 90+1'; Rober (yellow card) 90+2'; Suárez (yellow card) 90+3'	Report	Boateng (yellow card) 22'; Prcić (yellow card) 31'; Jason (yellow card) 33'; Róber (yellow card) 42'; Bardhi 60'; Rochina (yellow card) 90'	Stadium: Coliseum Alfonso Pérez; Attendance: 14,474; Referee: José Luis Munuera Montero

21 October 2018 9	Rayo Vallecano	1–2	Getafe	Madrid
12:00 CEST (UTC+02:00)	De Tomás 74', (yellow card) 75'; Comesaña (yellow card) 77'; Trejo (yellow card) 86' (yellow-red card) 90+3'; Amat (yellow card) 89'	Report	Cabrera (yellow card) 24'; Arambarri (yellow card) 47'; Foulquier 63'; Akieme 67' (o.g.); Antunes (yellow card) 77'; Suárez (yellow card) 81'; Mata (yellow card) 84'	Stadium: Vallecas; Attendance: 11,856; Referee: Mario Melero López

28 October 2018 10	Getafe	2–0	Real Betis	Getafe
12:00 CET (UTC+01:00)	Suárez (yellow card) 38'; Molina 60'; Foulquier 62'	Report	Lo Celso (yellow card) 49'; Barragán (yellow card) 90+2'	Stadium: Coliseum Alfonso Pérez; Attendance: 12,806; Referee: Santiago Jaime Latre

4 November 2018 11	Huesca	1–1	Getafe	Huesca
18:30 CET (UTC+01:00)	Miramón (yellow card) 23'; Etxeita 50'; Musto (yellow card) 59'; Ferreiro (yellow card) 74'; Semedo (yellow card) 74'; Gallar (yellow card) 75'	Report	Ángel (yellow card) 54'; Suárez (yellow card) 85'; Molina 90+1'; Djené (yellow card) 90+4'	Stadium: El Alcoraz; Attendance: 6,445; Referee: Juan Martínez Munuera

11 November 2018 12	Getafe	0–1	Valencia	Getafe
16:15 CET (UTC+01:00)	Antunes (yellow card) 30'; Bruno (yellow card) 75' (yellow-red card) 79'	Report	Gayà (yellow card) 54'; Coquelin (yellow card) 56'; Parejo 81' (pen.); Garay (yellow card) 90+3'	Stadium: Coliseum Alfonso Pérez; Attendance: 9,851; Referee: Ricardo de Burgos Bengoetxea

25 November 2018 13	Athletic Bilbao	1–1	Getafe	Bilbao
12:00 CET (UTC+01:00)	Núñez (yellow card) 25'; Nolaskoain 67', (yellow card) 73'; Martínez (yellow card) 80'; Córdoba (yellow card) 90+4'; Aduriz (yellow card) 90+4'	Report	Arambarri (yellow card) 27'; Amath (yellow card) 29'; Cabrera (yellow card) 32'; Mata 77', (yellow card) 90+5'	Stadium: San Mamés; Attendance: 40,121; Referee: Ignacio Iglesias Villanueva

1 December 2018 14	Getafe	3–0	Espanyol	Getafe
18:30 CET (UTC+01:00)	Amath (yellow card) 18'; Maksimović (yellow card) 21'; Molina 55'; Mata (yellow card) 58', (goal) 65'; Antunes 80'	Report	Pérez (yellow card) 14'; López (yellow card) 77'	Stadium: Coliseum Alfonso Pérez; Attendance: 9,287; Referee: Antonio Mateu Lahoz

7 December 2018 15	Leganés	1–1	Getafe	Leganés
21:00 CET (UTC+01:00)	Nyom (yellow card) 49', (goal) 64'; Pérez (red card) 90+3'	Report	Cabrera 39'; Mata (yellow card) 42'; Djené (yellow card) 75'	Stadium: Municipal de Butarque; Attendance: 11,327; Referee: Pablo González Fuertes

15 December 2018 16	Getafe	1–0	Real Sociedad	Getafe
13:00 CET (UTC+01:00)	Molina 3', (yellow card) 32'; Foulquier (yellow card) 35'; Cristóforo (yellow card) 86'	Report	Willian José (yellow card) 33'; Le Normand (yellow card) 38'; Illarramendi (yellow card) 63'; Januzaj (yellow card) 72'	Stadium: Coliseum Alfonso Pérez; Attendance: 9,018; Referee: Santiago Jaime Latre

21 December 2018 17	Girona	1–1	Getafe	Girona
19:30 CET (UTC+01:00)	Espinosa 85'; Granell (yellow card) 86'	Report	Foulquier (yellow card) 36'; Ángel 61'; Flamini (yellow card) 90+3'	Stadium: Montilivi; Attendance: 8,450; Referee: Javier Alberola Rojas

6 January 2019 18	Getafe	1–2	Barcelona	Getafe
20:45 CET (UTC+01:00)	Foulquier (yellow card) 15'; Mata 43'; Suárez (yellow card) 61'; Cabrera (yellow card) 69'; Maksimović (yellow card) 77'	Report	Arthur (yellow card) 12'; Alba (yellow card) 15'; Messi 20'; L. Suárez 39'; Vidal (yellow card) 65'	Stadium: Coliseum Alfonso Pérez; Attendance: 14,721; Referee: Guillermo Cuadra Fernández

12 January 2019 19	Villarreal	1–2	Getafe	Villarreal
20:45 CET (UTC+01:00)	Álvaro (yellow card) 29'; Gerard (yellow card) 36'; Costa (yellow card) 39'; Cabrera 75' (o.g.); Toko Ekambi (yellow card) 85'; Funes Mori (yellow card) 89'	Report	Foulquier (yellow card) 13'; Arambarri (yellow card) 30'; Molina 52'; Ángel 89', (yellow card) 90+3'	Stadium: Estadio de la Cerámica; Attendance: 13,671; Referee: Xavier Estrada Fernández

18 January 2019 20	Getafe	4–0	Alavés	Getafe
21:00 CET (UTC+01:00)	Mata 33' (pen.), 88'; Molina 46', 55'	Report	Navarro (yellow card) 40'; Pina (yellow card) 62'; Duarte (yellow card) 77'; Wakaso (yellow card) 78'	Stadium: Coliseum Alfonso Pérez; Attendance: 8,748; Referee: José Luis Munuera Montero

26 January 2019 21	Atlético Madrid	2–0	Getafe	Madrid
16:15 CET (UTC+01:00)	Griezmann 27'; Saúl 37'; Arias (yellow card) 48'; Rodri (yellow card) 76'	Report	Djené (yellow card) 34' (yellow-red card) 88'; Ángel (yellow card) 47'; Cristóforo (yellow card) 71'; Cabrera (yellow card) 83' (yellow-red card) 90+1'; Sáiz (yellow card) 90'	Stadium: Wanda Metropolitano; Attendance: 55,709; Referee: Ignacio Iglesias Villanueva

2 February 2019 22	Levante	0–0	Getafe	Valencia
13:00 CET (UTC+01:00)	Rochina (yellow card) 20'; Campaña (yellow card) 21'; Cabaco (yellow card) 56'; Jason (yellow card) 90+4'	Report	Flamini (yellow card) 22'; Miquel (yellow card) 31'; Foulquier (yellow card) 34'	Stadium: Ciutat de València; Attendance: 18,437; Referee: Adrián Cordero Vega

9 February 2019 23	Getafe	3–1	Celta Vigo	Getafe
13:00 CET (UTC+01:00)	Mata 39' (pen.), 81', (yellow card) 64'; Molina 62'; Flamini (yellow card) 69'; Olivera (yellow card) 89'	Report	Araujo 2'; Gómez (yellow card) 37' (yellow-red card) 37'; Costas (yellow card) 87'	Stadium: Coliseum Alfonso Pérez; Attendance: 9,918; Referee: Pablo González Fuertes

15 February 2019 24	Eibar	2–2	Getafe	Eibar
21:00 CET (UTC+01:00)	Charles 67' (pen.), 80'; Diop (yellow card) 78'; Cucurella (yellow card) 90'	Report	Mata 37'; Djené (yellow card) 44'; Foulquier 52'	Stadium: Ipurua; Attendance: 4,449; Referee: David Medié Jiménez

23 February 2019 25	Getafe	2–1	Rayo Vallecano	Getafe
13:00 CET (UTC+01:00)	Mata 28'; Antunes (yellow card) 32'; Molina 68'; Suárez (yellow card) 82'	Report	De Tomás 58'; Suárez (yellow card) 90'	Stadium: Coliseum Alfonso Pérez; Attendance: 11,207; Referee: Javier Alberola Rojas

3 March 2019 26	Real Betis	1–2	Getafe	Seville
16:15 CET (UTC+01:00)	Joaquín 75', (yellow card) 86'; Mandi (yellow card) 90+3'	Report	Arambarri (yellow card) 12'; Cabrera 20'; Mata 44', (yellow card) 51'	Stadium: Benito Villamarín; Attendance: 46,657; Referee: Juan Martínez Munuera

9 March 2019 27	Getafe	2–1	Huesca	Getafe
20:45 CET (UTC+01:00)	Mata 50', 77' (pen.)	Report	Galán (yellow card) 4'; Etxeita (yellow card) 20'; Gallego 35'; Ferreiro (yellow card) 69'; Musto (yellow card) 82'	Stadium: Coliseum Alfonso Pérez; Attendance: 10,882; Referee: Eduardo Prieto Iglesias

17 March 2019 28	Valencia	0–0	Getafe	Valencia
18:30 CET (UTC+01:00)	Gayà (yellow card) 24'; Guedes (yellow card) 64'; Mina (yellow card) 85'	Report	Arambarri (yellow card) 26'; Cabrera (yellow card) 74'; Flamini (yellow card) 78'; Portillo (yellow card) 86'	Stadium: Mestalla; Attendance: 41,778; Referee: José María Sánchez Martínez

30 March 2019 29	Getafe	0–2	Leganés	Getafe
13:00 CET (UTC+01:00)	Maksimović (yellow card) 17'; Suárez (yellow card) 65'; Olivera (yellow card) 70'; Djené (yellow card) 86'; Flamini (yellow card) 90+1'	Report	Santos 49'; Braithwaite (yellow card) 65'; Carrillo (yellow card) 68'; Juanfran 83'	Stadium: Coliseum Alfonso Pérez; Attendance: 12,705; Referee: Pablo González Fuertes

2 April 2019 30	Espanyol	1–1	Getafe	Barcelona
20:30 CEST (UTC+02:00)	Vilà (yellow card) 33'; Melendo (yellow card) 54'; Iglesias 56'; Naldo (yellow card) 81'; Hermoso (yellow card) 85'	Report	Suárez (yellow card) 23'; Ángel 72'; Cristóforo (yellow card) 78'; Djené (yellow card) 83'	Stadium: RCDE Stadium; Attendance: 16,322; Referee: Ricardo de Burgos Bengoetxea

7 April 2019 31	Getafe	1–0	Athletic Bilbao	Getafe
14:00 CEST (UTC+02:00)	Suárez (yellow card) 32'; Ángel (yellow card) 60', (goal) 78'	Report	San José (yellow card) 11'	Stadium: Coliseum Alfonso Pérez; Attendance: 11,617; Referee: José Luis González González

14 April 2019 32	Valladolid	2–2	Getafe	Valladolid
12:00 CEST (UTC+02:00)	Anuar (yellow card) 18'; Guardiola 30'; Ünal 69' (pen.); Rubio (yellow card) 71'; Plano (yellow card) 78'; Alcaraz (yellow card) 88'	Report	Arambarri 14', (yellow card) 79'; Olivera (yellow card) 40' (yellow-red card) 62'; Suárez (yellow card) 71'; Molina 90+6' (pen.)	Stadium: José Zorrilla; Attendance: 16,909; Referee: José Luis Munuera Montero

21 April 2019 33	Getafe	3–0	Sevilla	Getafe
14:00 CEST (UTC+02:00)	Mata 35' (pen.), (yellow card) 38'; Molina 45' (pen.), 53'; Bruno (yellow card) 50'; Cabrera (yellow card) 51'; Djené (red card) 74'	Report	Amadou (yellow card) 23'; Banega (yellow card) 30'; Mercado (yellow card) 32'; Vázquez (yellow card) 33'; Escudero (yellow card) 33' (yellow-red card) 45'	Stadium: Coliseum Alfonso Pérez; Attendance: 11,495; Referee: Antonio Mateu Lahoz

25 April 2019 34	Getafe	0–0	Real Madrid	Getafe
21:30 CEST (UTC+02:00)	Suárez (yellow card) 38'	Report	Isco (yellow card) 30'; Valverde (yellow card) 63'; Nacho (yellow card) 82'	Stadium: Coliseum Alfonso Pérez; Attendance: 13,135; Referee: Ricardo de Burgos Bengoetxea

28 April 2019 35	Real Sociedad	2–1	Getafe	San Sebastián
16:15 CEST (UTC+02:00)	Willian José 21' (pen.); Merino (yellow card) 45'; Oyarzabal 53'; Rulli (yellow card) 60'	Report	Cabrera (yellow card) 26'; Mata (yellow card) 75'; Sáiz (yellow card) 83', (goal) 89'	Stadium: Anoeta; Attendance: 19,386; Referee: Eduardo Prieto Iglesias

5 May 2019 36	Getafe	2–0	Girona	Getafe
12:00 CEST (UTC+02:00)	Molina 16'; Mata (yellow card) 47'; Bruno (yellow card) 60'; Ángel 77'; Olivera (yellow card) 90+1'	Report	Alcalá (yellow card) 45'; Juanpe (yellow card) 52'; Doumbia (yellow card) 60'; García (red card) 69'	Stadium: Coliseum Alfonso Pérez; Attendance: 10,615; Referee: Alejandro Hernández Hernández

12 May 2019 37	Barcelona	2–0	Getafe	Barcelona
18:30 CEST (UTC+02:00)	Vidal 39', (yellow card) 76'; Arambarri 89' (o.g.)	Report	Foulquier (yellow card) 37'; Olivera (yellow card) 52'; Djené (yellow card) 90+3'	Stadium: Camp Nou; Attendance: 57,088; Referee: José Luis González González

18 May 2019 38	Getafe	2–2	Villarreal	Getafe
16:15 CEST (UTC+02:00)	Portillo 13'; Maksimović (yellow card) 57', (goal) 76'; Suárez (yellow card) 90+2'	Report	Álvaro (yellow card) 22'; Fernández (yellow card) 22'; Iborra 44', (yellow card) 46'; Gerard 87'	Stadium: Coliseum Alfonso Pérez; Attendance: 13,579; Referee: Xavier Estrada Fernández

=== Copa del Rey ===
==== Round of 32 ====
31 October 2018 First leg	Córdoba	1–2	Getafe	Córdoba
20:30 CET (UTC+01:00)	Bruno 26' (o.g.); Loureiro (yellow card) 29'; Quezada (yellow card) 30'; Jesús (yellow card) 45'; Alfaro (yellow card) 46'; Jovanović (yellow card) 57'	Report	Djené (yellow card) 35'; Mata 45' (pen.), 90'	Stadium: Nuevo Arcángel; Attendance: 4,129; Referee: Guillermo Cuadra Fernández

4 December 2018 Second leg	Getafe	5–1 (7–2 agg.)	Córdoba	Getafe
19:30 CET (UTC+01:00)	Portillo 18'; Ángel 42' (pen.), 78', 80'; Rober 49'; Cristóforo (yellow card) 59'	Report	Romero (yellow card) 35'; Alfaro (yellow card) 41'; Aythami 70'	Stadium: Coliseum Alfonso Pérez; Attendance: 5,562; Referee: Juan Martínez Munuera

==== Round of 16 ====
9 January 2019 First leg	Getafe	1–0	Real Valladolid	Getafe
20:30 CET (UTC+01:00)	Foulquier (yellow card) 31'; Sáiz (yellow card) 41'; Ángel 90+2'	Report	Fernández (yellow card) 42'; Čop (yellow card) 73'; Anuar (yellow card) 78'	Stadium: Coliseum Alfonso Pérez; Attendance: 6,007; Referee: Mario Melero López

15 January 2019 Second leg	Real Valladolid	1–1 (1–2 agg.)	Getafe	Valladolid
19:30 CET (UTC+01:00)	Anuar (yellow card) 16'; Nacho (yellow card) 33'; Verde 50'; Alcaraz (yellow card) 70'	Report	Ángel 29' (pen.); Chichizola (yellow card) 30'; Antunes (yellow card) 33'; Djené (yellow card) 73'; Bruno (yellow card) 84'	Stadium: José Zorrilla; Attendance: 11,183; Referee: Javier Alberola Rojas

==== Quarter-finals ====
22 January 2019 First leg	Getafe	1–0	Valencia	Getafe
21:30 CET (UTC+01:00)	Bruno (yellow card) 59'; Arambarri (yellow card) 63'; Mata (yellow card) 69'; Molina 77'	Report	Vezo (yellow card) 54'; Wass (yellow card) 65'; Doménech (yellow card) 69'; Cheryshev (yellow card) 73'; Lato (yellow card) 90'	Stadium: Coliseum Alfonso Pérez; Attendance: 7,021; Referee: Jesús Gil Manzano

29 January 2019 Second leg	Valencia	3–1 (3–2 agg.)	Getafe	Valencia
21:30 CET (UTC+01:00)	Gabriel (yellow card) 45'; Mina (yellow card) 46'; Rodrigo 61', 90+2', 90+3', (yellow card) 90+4'; Garay (yellow card) 68'; Diakhaby (red card) 90+10'	Report	Molina 1', (yellow card) 84'; Mata (yellow card) 10'; Suárez (yellow card) 20'; Djené (yellow card) 25' (yellow-red card) 74'; Portillo (yellow card) 43'; Chichizola (yellow card) 44'; Arambarri (yellow card) 90+7'	Stadium: Mestalla; Attendance: 34,140; Referee: Xavier Estrada Fernández

== Statistics ==
=== Appearances and goals ===
Last updated on 18 May 2019

No.	Pos	Nat	Player	Total		La Liga		Copa del Rey	
No.	Pos	Nat	Player	Apps	Goals	Apps	Goals	Apps	Goals
Goalkeepers
1	GK	(Argentina) ARG	Leandro Chichizola	7	0	1	0	6	0
13	GK	(Spain) ESP	David Soria	37	0	37	0	0	0
25	GK	(Spain) ESP	Rubén Yáñez	0	0	0	0	0	0
Defenders
2	DF	(Togo) TOG	Djené	38	0	34	0	3+1	0
3	DF	(Portugal) POR	Vitorino Antunes	31	1	25+3	1	2+1	0
4	DF	(Spain) ESP	Bruno	29	0	18+5	0	5+1	0
6	DF	(Uruguay) URU	Leandro Cabrera	36	2	31+1	2	4	0
17	DF	(Uruguay) URU	Mathías Olivera	14	0	12+2	0	0	0
21	DF	(Spain) ESP	Ignasi Miquel	11	0	6+2	0	3	0
22	DF	(Uruguay) URU	Damián Suárez	42	0	36	0	5+1	0
24	DF	(France) FRA	Dimitri Foulquier	29	3	23+2	3	3+1	0
Midfielders
5	MF	(Spain) ESP	Markel Bergara	3	0	0+3	0	0	0
8	MF	(Spain) ESP	Francisco Portillo	37	2	19+13	1	4+1	1
10	MF	(Japan) JPN	Gaku Shibasaki	9	0	5+2	0	1+1	0
11	MF	(Spain) ESP	Samuel Sáiz	12	1	2+8	1	2	0
15	MF	(Uruguay) URU	Sebastián Cristóforo	20	0	4+11	0	4+1	0
16	MF	(France) FRA	Mathieu Flamini	13	0	4+6	0	3	0
18	MF	(Uruguay) URU	Mauro Arambarri	36	1	32+1	1	2+1	0
20	MF	(Serbia) SRB	Nemanja Maksimović	40	1	36	1	3+1	0
23	MF	(Spain) ESP	Iván Alejo	3	0	0	0	3	0
Forwards
7	FW	(Spain) ESP	Jaime Mata	38	16	27+7	14	3+1	2
9	FW	(Spain) ESP	Ángel	42	13	20+17	8	3+2	5
19	FW	(Spain) ESP	Jorge Molina	41	16	28+10	14	1+2	2
27	FW	(Spain) ESP	Hugo Duro	14	0	5+6	0	1+2	0
-	FW	(Senegal) SEN	Amath	15	1	13+2	1	0	0
Players who have made an appearance or had a squad number this season but have left the club
17	MF	(Spain) ESP	Rober	11	1	0+7	0	3+1	1
14	FW	(Spain) ESP	Sergi Guardiola	5	0	0+3	0	2	0
