= 2020–21 Getafe CF season =

Getafe CF
2020–21 season
- Owner: Ángel Torres
- President: Ángel Torres
- Head coach: José Bordalás
- Stadium: Coliseum Alfonso Pérez
- La Liga: 15th
- Copa del Rey: Second round
- Top goalscorer: League: Ángel; Jaime Mata (5 each); All: Ángel (6)
- Biggest win: Getafe 3–0 Real Betis; Getafe 3–0 Valencia
- Biggest defeat: Athletic Bilbao 5–1 Getafe
Home colours	Away colours	Third colours

The 2020–21 season was the 38th season in the existence of Getafe CF and the club's fourth consecutive season in the top flight of Spanish football. In addition to the domestic league, Getafe participated in this season's edition of the Copa del Rey. The season covered the period from 20 July 2020 to 30 June 2021, with the late start to the season due to the COVID-19 pandemic in Spain.

== Players ==
=== First-team squad ===
As of 1 February 2021

Note: Flags indicate national team as defined under FIFA eligibility rules; some limited exceptions apply. Players may hold more than one non-FIFA nationality.

No.	Pos.	Nation	Player
1	GK	ESP	Rubén Yáñez
2	DF	TOG	Djené (captain)
3	DF	URU	Erick Cabaco
4	DF	ESP	Xabier Etxeita
5	MF	JPN	Takefusa Kubo (on loan from Real Madrid)
6	DF	ESP	Chema
7	FW	ESP	Jaime Mata
8	MF	ESP	Francisco Portillo
9	FW	ESP	Ángel
10	FW	TUR	Enes Ünal
11	MF	ESP	Carles Aleñá (on loan from Barcelona)

No.	Pos.	Nation	Player
12	DF	CMR	Allan Nyom
13	GK	ESP	David Soria
15	MF	ESP	Marc Cucurella
17	DF	URU	Mathías Olivera
18	MF	URU	Mauro Arambarri
19	FW	ESP	Darío Poveda (on loan from Atlético Madrid)
20	MF	SRB	Nemanja Maksimović
21	DF	MAR	Sofian Chakla (on loan from Villarreal)
22	DF	URU	Damián Suárez
23	FW	COL	Cucho Hernández (on loan from Watford)
24	MF	ESP	David Timor

=== Reserve team ===
Note: Flags indicate national team as defined under FIFA eligibility rules; some limited exceptions apply. Players may hold more than one non-FIFA nationality.

No.	Pos.	Nation	Player
28	DF	ESP	David Alba
29	DF	ESP	Juan Iglesias
35	MF	GHA	Sabit Abdulai (on loan from Extremadura)
37	DF	IRL	Ryan Nolan

No.	Pos.	Nation	Player
38	MF	IRL	John Patrick
39	FW	SEN	Mamor Niang
40	DF	GHA	Amankwaa Akurugu
41	DF	ESP	Chinchu

=== Out on loan ===
Note: Flags indicate national team as defined under FIFA eligibility rules; some limited exceptions apply. Players may hold more than one non-FIFA nationality.

No.	Pos.	Nation	Player
—	DF	ESP	Miguel Ángel (at Valladolid Promesas until 30 June 2021)
—	DF	ESP	Ignasi Miquel (at Leganés until 30 June 2021)
—	FW	SEN	Amath Ndiaye (at Mallorca until 30 June 2021)

No.	Pos.	Nation	Player
—	FW	ESP	Hugo Duro (at Real Madrid Castilla until 30 June 2021)
—	FW	SCO	Jack Harper (at Villarreal B until 30 June 2021)

== Transfers ==
=== In ===
Date	Player	From	Type	Fee	Ref
20 July 2020	(Spain) Raúl García	Valladolid	Loan return		
21 July 2020	(Scotland) Jack Harper	Alcorcón	Loan return		
21 July 2020	(Spain) Álvaro Jiménez	Albacete	Loan return		
21 July 2020	(Spain) Rubén Yáñez	Huesca	Loan return		
8 August 2020	(Spain) Miguel Ángel	Fuenlabrada	Loan return		
12 August 2020	(Turkey) Enes Ünal	Villarreal	Transfer	€9M	
14 August 2020	(Colombia) Cucho Hernández	(England) Watford	Loan		
15 August 2020	(Spain) Marc Cucurella	Barcelona	Buyout clause	€10M	
24 August 2020	(Spain) Ignasi Miquel	Girona	Loan return		
6 January 2021	(Spain) Carles Aleñá	Barcelona	Loan		
8 January 2021	(Japan) Takefusa Kubo	Real Madrid	Loan		

=== Out ===
Date	Player	To	Type	Fee	Ref
6 August 2020	(Spain) Iván Alejo	Cádiz	Buyout clause	€3M	
6 August 2020	(Brazil) Deyverson	(Brazil) Palmeiras	Loan return		
6 August 2020	(Nigeria) Peter Etebo	(England) Stoke City	Loan return		
6 August 2020	(Spain) Enric Gallego	Osasuna	Buyout clause	€2M	
6 August 2020	(Spain) Jason	Valencia	Loan return		
6 August 2020	(Brazil) Kenedy	(England) Chelsea	Loan return		
6 August 2020	(Republic of the Congo) Merveil Ndockyt	(Croatia) Osijek	Buyout clause	€550K	
13 August 2020	(Portugal) Vitorino Antunes	(Portugal) Sporting CP	Transfer	Free	
17 August 2020	(Spain) José Lazo	Almería	Buyout clause	€4M	
25 August 2020	(Spain) Jorge Molina	Granada	Transfer	Free	

== Pre-season and friendlies ==
Win Draw Loss

9 September 2020 Friendly	Fuenlabrada	1–2	Getafe	Fuenlabrada, Spain
20:00 CEST (UTC+2)	Juanma 22'	Report	Cucurella 54'; Mata 88'	Stadium: Estadio Fernando Torres; Attendance: 0

12 September 2020 Friendly	Zaragoza	0–2	Getafe	Zaragoza, Spain
18:30 CEST (UTC+2)		Report	Keita 6'; Mata 27' (pen.)	Stadium: La Romareda; Attendance: 0

15 September 2020 Friendly	Real Madrid	6–0	Getafe	Madrid, Spain
12:00 CEST (UTC+2)	Benzema; Ramos; Arribas			Stadium: Alfredo Di Stéfano Stadium; Attendance: 0

== Competitions ==
=== Overall record ===
Competition	First match	Last match	Starting round	Final position	Record							
Competition	First match	Last match	Starting round	Final position	Pld	W	D	L	GF	GA	GD	Win %
La Liga	19 September 2020	23 May 2021	Matchday 1	15th	38	9	11	18	28	43	−15	23.68
Copa del Rey	17 December 2020	5 January 2021	First round	Second round	2	1	0	1	2	2	+0	50.00
Total					40	10	11	19	30	45	−15	25.00

Source: Soccerway

=== La Liga ===
==== League table ====
Pos	Team	Pld	W	D	L	GF	GA	GD	Pts
13	Valencia	38	10	13	15	50	53	−3	43
14	Levante	38	9	14	15	46	57	−11	41
15	Getafe	38	9	11	18	28	43	−15	38
16	Alavés	38	9	11	18	36	57	−21	38
17	Elche	38	8	12	18	34	55	−21	36

Source: La Liga
Rules for classification: 1) Points; 2) Head-to-head points; 3) Head-to-head goal difference; 4) Goal difference; 5) Goals scored; 6) Fair-play points (Note: Head-to-head record is used only after all the matches between the teams in question have been played)

==== Results summary ====
Overall								Home						Away					
Pld	W	D	L	GF	GA	GD	Pts	W	D	L	GF	GA	GD	W	D	L	GF	GA	GD
38	9	11	18	28	43	−15	38	6	6	7	15	13	+2	3	5	11	13	30	−17

Source: La Liga

==== Results by round ====
Round	1	2	3	4	5	6	7	8	9	10	11	12	13	14	15	16	17	18	19	20	21	22	23	24	25	26	27	28	29	30	31	32	33	34	35	36	37	38
Ground	A	H	A	H	A	H	H	A	H	A	H	A	H	A	H	A	H	A	H	A	H	A	H	A	H	A	H	H	A	H	A	A	H	A	H	A	H	A
Result	L	W	D	W	L	W	L	D	L	D	D	L	L	W	D	L	L	W	W	L	D	L	L	L	W	L	D	D	D	L	L	W	D	L	L	L	W	D
Position	16	7	7	1	7	4	9	8	10	11	11	15	16	11	12	14	16	13	10	13	12	13	14	15	13	15	15	14	15	15	15	15	15	15	15	16	16	15

Source: La Liga
A = Away; H = Home; W = Win; D = Draw; L = Loss

==== Matches ====
The league fixtures were announced on 31 August 2020.

19 September 2020 2	Getafe	1–0	Osasuna	Getafe
18:30 CEST (UTC+2)	Maksimović (yellow card) 16'; Mata 54'; Cucurella (yellow card) 57'; Arambarri (yellow card) 89'; Suárez (yellow card) 90+3'	Report	Aridane (yellow card) 64'	Stadium: Coliseum Alfonso Pérez; Attendance: 0 (Note: The match was played behind closed doors due to the COVID-19 pandemic in Spain.); Referee: Alejandro Hernández Hernández

26 September 2020 3	Alavés	0–0	Getafe	Vitoria-Gasteiz
13:00 CEST (UTC+2)	Battaglia (yellow card) 65'; Lejeune (yellow card) 74'	Report	Djené (yellow card) 59'; Suárez (yellow card) 83'	Stadium: Mendizorrotza Stadium; Attendance: 0 Referee: Javier Alberola Rojas

29 September 2020 4	Getafe	3–0	Real Betis	Getafe
21:30 CEST (UTC+2)	Ángel 13', 42'; Suárez (yellow card) 22'; Olivera (yellow card) 37'; Cucurella 39'; Arambarri (yellow card) 67'; Cabaco (yellow card) 84'	Report	Fekir (yellow card) 71'; Akouokou (yellow card) 78'; Mandi (yellow card) 82' (yellow-red card) 83'	Stadium: Coliseum Alfonso Pérez; Attendance: 0 Referee: Juan Martínez Munuera

3 October 2020 5	Real Sociedad	3–0	Getafe	San Sebastián
18:30 CEST (UTC+2)	Oyarzabal 28' (pen.); Gorosabel (yellow card) 41'; Merino (yellow card) 71', (goal) 79'; Silva (yellow card) 73'; Portu 81'	Report	Suárez (yellow card) 45+1'; Hernández (yellow card) 56'; Etxeita (yellow card) 66'	Stadium: Anoeta; Attendance: 0 Referee: Antonio Mateu Lahoz

17 October 2020 6	Getafe	1–0	Barcelona	Getafe
21:00 CEST (UTC+2)	Mata (yellow card) 27', (goal) 56' (pen.); Cabaco (yellow card) 28'; Nyom (yellow card) 73'; Olivera (yellow card) 90+3'	Report	Piqué (yellow card) 24'; Roberto (yellow card) 41'; Dest (yellow card) 90+7'	Stadium: Coliseum Alfonso Pérez; Attendance: 0 Referee: César Soto Grado

25 October 2020 7	Getafe	0–1	Granada	Getafe
18:30 CET (UTC+1)	Mata (yellow card) 12'; Olivera (yellow card) 22'; Djené (yellow card) 45'; Ünal (yellow card) 89'	Report	Germán (yellow card) 39'; Montoro 45+2' (pen.); Herrera (yellow card) 90+1'	Stadium: Coliseum Alfonso Pérez; Attendance: 0 Referee: Jesús Gil Manzano

1 November 2020 8	Valencia	2–2	Getafe	Valencia
21:00 CET (UTC+1)	Musah 22', (yellow card) 69'; Guillamón (yellow card) 32'; Gabriel (yellow card) 41'; Correia (yellow card) 48' (yellow-red card) 56'; Gómez (yellow card) 61'; Cheryshev (yellow card) 76'; Wass (yellow card) 82'; Soler 90+10' (pen.)	Report	Arambarri (yellow card) 72'; Hernández 87'; Suárez (yellow card) 90' (yellow-red card) 90+8'; Ángel 90+4'; Djené (yellow card) 90+6'; Mata (yellow card) 90+9'	Stadium: Mestalla; Attendance: 0 Referee: Jorge Figueroa Vázquez

8 November 2020 9	Getafe	1–3	Villarreal	Getafe
14:00 CET (UTC+1)	Arambarri 16'; Timor (yellow card) 42'; Ángel (yellow card) 52'; Maksimović (yellow card) 90+1'	Report	Alcácer 11'; Trigueros 17', (yellow card) 65'; Gómez (yellow card) 21'; Iborra (yellow card) 27'; Gerard 62'; Pedraza (yellow card) 90+3'	Stadium: Coliseum Alfonso Pérez; Attendance: 0 Referee: José Luis Munuera Montero

22 November 2020 10	Eibar	0–0	Getafe	Eibar
14:00 CET (UTC+1)	Diop (yellow card) 45'; Kike (yellow card) 58' (yellow-red card) 88'	Report	Nyom (yellow card) 28'; Mata (yellow card) 80'; Olivera (yellow card) 86'; Chema (yellow card) 90+1'	Stadium: Ipurua; Attendance: 0 Referee: Pablo González Fuertes

29 November 2020 11	Getafe	1–1	Athletic Bilbao	Getafe
16:15 CET (UTC+1)	Hernández (yellow card) 61'; Cabaco (yellow card) 71'; Ángel 75'	Report	Villalibre 9'; Capa (yellow card) 14'; Vesga (yellow card) 48'; Morcillo (yellow card) 88'; Martínez (yellow card) 88'	Stadium: Coliseum Alfonso Pérez; Attendance: 0 Referee: Mario Melero López

5 December 2020 12	Levante	3–0	Getafe	Valencia
14:00 CET (UTC+1)	Roger 5', (yellow card) 52'; Gómez 17', (yellow card) 50'; De Frutos 57'	Report	Chema (red card) 7'; Djené (yellow card) 11' (yellow-red card) 77'; Ángel (yellow card) 11'; Mata (yellow card) 23'; Arambarri (yellow card) 45+2'; Nyom (yellow card) 49'; Cucurella (yellow card) 88'	Stadium: Ciutat de València; Attendance: 0 Referee: David Medié Jiménez

12 December 2020 13	Getafe	0–1	Sevilla	Getafe
16:15 CET (UTC+1)	Arambarri (yellow card) 36'; Ünal (yellow card) 83'	Report	Rakitić (yellow card) 40'; Diego Carlos (yellow card) 45+1'; Vidal (yellow card) 51'; Etxeita 81' (o.g.)	Stadium: Coliseum Alfonso Pérez; Attendance: 0 Referee: Juan Martínez Munuera

20 December 2020 14	Cádiz	0–2	Getafe	Cádiz
18:30 CET (UTC+1)	Cala (yellow card) 23'	Report	Hernández 33', (yellow card) 39'; Cucurella (yellow card) 42'; Cabaco (yellow card) 57'; Nyom (yellow card) 64'; Olivera (yellow card) 74'; Yáñez (yellow card) 90+1'; Maksimović 90+4'	Stadium: Ramón de Carranza; Attendance: 0 Referee: Santiago Jaime Latre

23 December 2020 15	Getafe	1–1	Celta Vigo	Getafe
17:30 CET (UTC+1)	Suárez 7', (yellow card) 84'; Nyom (yellow card) 55'; Cabaco (yellow card) 90+3'	Report	Aspas 17' (pen.); Murillo (yellow card) 68'; Araujo (yellow card) 86'; Mor (yellow card) 90+1'	Stadium: Coliseum Alfonso Pérez; Attendance: 0 Referee: Pablo González Fuertes

30 December 2020 16	Atlético Madrid	1–0	Getafe	Madrid
19:15 CET (UTC+1)	Suárez 20'; Savić (yellow card) 26'; Giménez (yellow card) 84'	Report	Ángel (yellow card) 24'; Timor (yellow card) 75'; Etxeita (yellow card) 83'	Stadium: Wanda Metropolitano; Attendance: 0 Referee: Jesús Gil Manzano

2 January 2021 17	Getafe	0–1	Valladolid	Getafe
18:30 CET (UTC+1)	Djené (yellow card) 59'; Cabaco (yellow card) 71'; Suárez (yellow card) 73'	Report	Weissman 37'; Pérez (yellow card) 85'; Alcaraz (yellow card) 87'	Stadium: Coliseum Alfonso Pérez; Attendance: 0 Referee: Isidro Díaz de Mera Escuderos

11 January 2021 18	Elche	1–3	Getafe	Elche
19:00 CET (UTC+1)	Guti 4'; Marcone (yellow card) 44' (yellow-red card) 52'; Nino (yellow card) 78'; Rigoni (yellow card) 82'	Report	Suárez (yellow card) 31'; Cucurella 39'; Mata 69'; Aleñá (yellow card) 74'; Ángel 86' (pen.)	Stadium: Estadio Manuel Martínez Valero; Attendance: 0 Referee: José Luis Munuera Montero
Note: Match originally scheduled for 10 January 2021, but postponed due to a storm.

20 January 2021 19	Getafe	1–0	Huesca	Getafe
19:00 CET (UTC+1)	Nyom (yellow card) 7'; Mata (yellow card) 41'; Arambarri 69'	Report	Mir (yellow card) 29'; Ontiveros (yellow card) 62'; Seoane (yellow card) 90+6'; Siovas (yellow card) 90+7'	Stadium: Coliseum Alfonso Pérez; Attendance: 0 Referee: David Medié Jiménez

25 January 2021 20	Athletic Bilbao	5–1	Getafe	Bilbao
21:00 CET (UTC+1)	Núñez (yellow card) 9'; R. García 12', 61', (yellow card) 17'; D. García (yellow card) 40'; Yeray 50'; Vencedor (yellow card) 57'; Berenguer 75'; De Marcos 82'	Report	Cucurella 1'; Maksimović (yellow card) 8'; Mata (penalty missed) 29', (yellow card) 50'; Etxeita (yellow card) 57'; Djené (yellow card) 79'	Stadium: San Mamés; Attendance: 0 Referee: Adrián Cordero Vega

31 January 2021 21	Getafe	0–0	Alavés	Getafe
14:00 CET (UTC+1)	Arambarri (yellow card) 9'; Suárez (yellow card) 78'; Yáñez (yellow card) 83'	Report	Lejeune (yellow card) 24'; García (yellow card) 57'; Navarro (yellow card) 90+3'	Stadium: Coliseum Alfonso Pérez; Attendance: 0 Referee: Santiago Jaime Latre

6 February 2021 22	Sevilla	3–0	Getafe	Seville
21:00 CET (UTC+1)	Gudelj (yellow card) 38'; Munir 67'; A. Gómez 87'; En-Nesyri 89'	Report	Cucurella (yellow card) 9'; Djené (red card) 54'; Mata (yellow card) 69'; Timor (yellow card) 73'; Suárez (yellow card) 90+1'	Stadium: Ramón Sánchez Pizjuán; Attendance: 0 Referee: Juan Martínez Munuera

9 February 2021 1	Real Madrid	2–0	Getafe	Madrid
21:00 CET (UTC+1)	Benzema 60'; Mendy 66', (yellow card) 71'	Report	Chakla (yellow card) 52'	Stadium: Alfredo Di Stéfano; Attendance: 0 Referee: Javier Alberola Rojas
Note: The match was originally scheduled for 13 September 2020, but was postponed because of Madrid's participation in the 2019–20 UEFA Champions League, which meant a later training start.

14 February 2021 23	Getafe	0–1	Real Sociedad	Getafe
14:00 CET (UTC+1)	Chakla (yellow card) 43'; Hernández (yellow card) 71'; Portillo (yellow card) 77'	Report	Isak 30'; Portu (yellow card) 89'; Fernández (yellow card) 90+1'; Barrenetxea (yellow card) 90+2'	Stadium: Coliseum Alfonso Pérez; Attendance: 0 Referee: Pablo González Fuertes

19 February 2021 24	Real Betis	1–0	Getafe	Seville
21:00 CET (UTC+1)	Canales (yellow card) 62', (penalty missed) 76'; Rodríguez (yellow card) 66'; Guardado (yellow card) 70'; Iglesias 84' (pen.); Carvalho (yellow card) 90+1' (yellow-red card) 90+3'	Report	Cabaco (yellow card) 38'; Arambarri (yellow card) 45'; Chakla (yellow card) 75'; Nyom (yellow card) 80'; Aleñá (yellow card) 90+1'	Stadium: Benito Villamarín; Attendance: 0 Referee: Xavier Estrada Fernández

27 February 2021 25	Getafe	3–0	Valencia	Getafe
21:00 CET (UTC+1)	Ünal (yellow card) 13'; Djené (yellow card) 29'; Cabaco (yellow card) 31'; Arambarri 39'; Mata 55'; Cucurella (yellow card) 57'; Nyom (yellow card) 76'; Aleñá 87'	Report	Correia (yellow card) 6'; Diakhaby (red card) 51'; Gayà (yellow card) 76'	Stadium: Coliseum Alfonso Pérez; Attendance: 0 Referee: Jorge Figueroa Vázquez

6 March 2021 26	Valladolid	2–1	Getafe	Valladolid
14:00 CET (UTC+1)	Plano 14'; Weissman 24'; Alcaraz (yellow card) 56'; San Emeterio (yellow card) 80'	Report	Mata 37', (red card) 85'; Kubo (yellow card) 54'; Nyom (yellow card) 57'	Stadium: José Zorrilla; Attendance: 0 Referee: Mario Melero López

13 March 2021 27	Getafe	0–0	Atlético Madrid	Getafe
21:00 CET (UTC+1)	Nyom (red card) 70'; Soria (yellow card) 90+1'	Report	Giménez (yellow card) 45+1'; Savić (yellow card) 45+2'; Félix (yellow card) 77'; Llorente (yellow card) 83'; Hermoso (yellow card) 84'	Stadium: Coliseum Alfonso Pérez; Attendance: 0 Referee: José María Sánchez Martínez

21 March 2021 28	Getafe	1–1	Elche	Getafe
14:00 CET (UTC+1)	Arambarri (yellow card) 25'; Chakla (yellow card) 45+5'; Ünal 61'; Ángel (penalty missed) 84'; Timor (yellow card) 90+7'	Report	Milla 20', (yellow card) 63'; Marcone (yellow card) 37'; Boyé (yellow card) 45+5'; Calvo (yellow card) 55'; Carrillo (yellow card) 66'; Fidel (yellow card) 68'; Gonzalo (yellow card) 83'	Stadium: Coliseum Alfonso Pérez; Attendance: 0 Referee: Alejandro Hernández Hernández

3 April 2021 29	Osasuna	0–0	Getafe	Pamplona
18:30 CEST (UTC+2)	Oier (yellow card) 46'; D. García (yellow card) 68'	Report	Chakla (yellow card) 2'; Cucurella (yellow card) 49'; Mata (yellow card) 90+3'	Stadium: El Sadar; Attendance: 0 Referee: Pablo González Fuertes

10 April 2021 30	Getafe	0–1	Cádiz	Getafe
14:00 CEST (UTC+2)	Mata (yellow card) 11'; Arambarri (yellow card) 62'; Josete (yellow card) 84'	Report	Timor 64' (o.g.); José Mari (yellow card) 69'; Jønsson (yellow card) 73'	Stadium: Coliseum Alfonso Pérez; Attendance: 0 Referee: Ricardo de Burgos Bengoetxea

18 April 2021 33	Getafe	0–0	Real Madrid	Getafe
21:00 CEST (UTC+2)	Nyom (yellow card) 58'; Ángel (yellow card) 75'; Cucurella (yellow card) 86'	Report	Vinícius (yellow card) 54'	Stadium: Coliseum Alfonso Pérez; Attendance: 0 Referee: José María Sánchez Martínez
Note: The match was originally scheduled for 28 April 2021, but was brought forward by La Liga.

22 April 2021 31	Barcelona	5–2	Getafe	Barcelona
22:00 CEST (UTC+2)	Lenglet (yellow card) 6'; Messi 8', 33'; Chakla 28' (o.g.); Araújo (yellow card) 68', (goal) 87'; Griezmann 90+3' (pen.)	Report	Lenglet 12' (o.g.); Ünal 69' (pen.)	Stadium: Camp Nou; Attendance: 0 Referee: Jorge Figueroa Vázquez

25 April 2021 32	Huesca	0–2	Getafe	Huesca
14:00 CEST (UTC+2)	Ferreiro (yellow card) 40'; Escriche (yellow card) 49'	Report	Ünal 20', 52', (yellow card) 54'; Arambarri (yellow card) 71'; Iglesias (yellow card) 90+2'; Suárez (yellow card) 90+3'	Stadium: El Alcoraz; Attendance: 0 Referee: Juan Martínez Munuera

2 May 2021 34	Villarreal	1–0	Getafe	Villarreal
16:15 CEST (UTC+2)	Funes Mori (yellow card) 67'; Pino 79'	Report	Cucurella (yellow card) 63'; Maksimović (yellow card) 81'	Stadium: Estadio de la Cerámica; Attendance: 0 Referee: Xavier Estrada Fernández

9 May 2021 35	Getafe	0–1	Eibar	Getafe
14:00 CEST (UTC+2)	Timor (yellow card) 82'	Report	Kike (yellow card) 40'; Diop (yellow card) 67'; Recio 89' (pen.)	Stadium: Coliseum Alfonso Pérez; Attendance: 0 Referee: Javier Alberola Rojas

12 May 2021 36	Celta Vigo	1–0	Getafe	Vigo
20:00 CEST (UTC+2)	Nolito 24'; De. Suárez (yellow card) 90+3'	Report	Da. Suárez (yellow card) 67'; Chema (yellow card) 90+1'; Olivera (yellow card) 90+3'	Stadium: Balaídos; Attendance: 0 Referee: Mario Melero López

16 May 2021 37	Getafe	2–1	Levante	Getafe
18:30 CEST (UTC+2)	Aleñá 13'; Arambarri (yellow card) 82'; Kubo 84', (yellow card) 85'; Iglesias (yellow card) 86'; Timor (red card) 90+1'; Soria (yellow card) 90+4'; Hernández (yellow card) 90+6'	Report	Melero 30'	Stadium: Coliseum Alfonso Pérez; Attendance: 0 Referee: Adrián Cordero Vega

23 May 2021 38	Granada	0–0	Getafe	Granada
18:30 CEST (UTC+2)	Germán (yellow card) 15'; Soro (yellow card) 22'; Díaz (yellow card) 56'; Eteki (yellow card) 63'	Report	Maksimović (yellow card) 35'; Abdulai (yellow card) 86'	Stadium: Nuevo Los Cármenes; Attendance: 0 Referee: David Medié Jiménez

=== Copa del Rey ===
17 December 2020 First round	Anaitasuna	1–2	Getafe	Azkoitia
19:00 CET (UTC+1)	Eskurtza 55'; Garate (yellow card) 82'	Report	Ünal 73'; Abdulai (yellow card) 77'; Olivera (yellow card) 79'; Ángel 90+4' (pen.)	Stadium: Txerloia; Referee: Adrián Cordero Vega

5 January 2021 Second round	Córdoba	1–0	Getafe	Córdoba
17:00 CET (UTC+1)	Willy 6', (yellow card) 34'; Ortiz (yellow card) 11'; Farrando (yellow card) 16'; Del Moral (yellow card) 68'	Report	Diaby (yellow card) 12'; Timor (yellow card) 13'; Iglesias (yellow card) 34'; Cucurella (yellow card) 77'	Stadium: Nuevo Arcángel; Referee: Alejandro Hernández Hernández

== Statistics ==
=== Squad statistics ===
No.	Pos	Nat	Player	Total		La Liga		Copa del Rey	
No.	Pos	Nat	Player	Apps	Goals	Apps	Goals	Apps	Goals
Goalkeepers
1	GK	(Spain) ESP	Rubén Yáñez	11	0	10	0	1	0
13	GK	(Spain) ESP	David Soria	29	0	28	0	1	0
Defenders
2	DF	(Togo) TOG	Djené	36	0	34	0	1+1	0
3	DF	(Uruguay) URU	Erick Cabaco	21	0	15+5	0	0+1	0
4	DF	(Spain) ESP	Xabier Etxeita	12	0	9+2	0	1	0
6	DF	(Spain) ESP	Chema	12	0	7+3	0	2	0
12	DF	(Cameroon) CMR	Allan Nyom	32	0	28+3	0	1	0
15	DF	(Spain) ESP	Marc Cucurella	39	3	37	3	0+2	0
17	DF	(Uruguay) URU	Mathías Olivera	32	0	30+1	0	0+1	0
21	DF	(Morocco) MAR	Sofian Chakla	13	1	9+2	0	2	1
22	DF	(Uruguay) URU	Damián Suárez	31	1	28+3	1	0	0
28	DF	(Spain) ESP	David Alba	1	0	0	0	1	0
29	DF	(Spain) ESP	Juan Iglesias	12	0	7+3	0	2	0
40	DF	(Ghana) GHA	Emmanuel Akurugu	1	0	0+1	0	0	0
Midfielders
5	MF	(Japan) JPN	Takefusa Kubo	18	1	8+10	1	0	0
8	MF	(Spain) ESP	Francisco Portillo	18	0	3+13	0	1+1	0
11	MF	(Spain) ESP	Carles Aleñá	22	2	15+7	2	0	0
18	MF	(Uruguay) URU	Mauro Arambarri	35	3	33+1	3	0+1	0
20	MF	(Serbia) SRB	Nemanja Maksimović	35	1	34+1	1	0	0
24	MF	(Spain) ESP	David Timor	31	0	15+15	0	1	0
32	MF	(Equatorial Guinea) GEQ	Josete Miranda	4	0	0+4	0	0	0
35	MF	(Ghana) GHA	Sabit Abdulai	4	0	0+3	0	1	0
38	MF	(Republic of Ireland) IRL	John Patrick	8	0	0+6	0	2	0
Forwards
7	FW	(Spain) ESP	Jaime Mata	35	5	23+10	5	1+1	0
9	FW	(Spain) ESP	Ángel	35	6	12+21	5	1+1	1
10	FW	(Turkey) TUR	Enes Ünal	29	5	15+13	4	0+1	1
19	FW	(Spain) ESP	Darío Poveda	1	0	0+1	0	0	0
23	FW	(Colombia) COL	Cucho Hernández	23	2	18+5	2	0	0
39	FW	(Spain) ESP	Mamor Niang	2	0	0+1	0	1	0
Players who have made an appearance or had a squad number this season but have left the club
1	GK	(Argentina) ARG	Leandro Chichizola	0	0	0	0	0	0
14	MF	(Croatia) CRO	Ante Palaversa	4	0	0+2	0	2	0
26	FW	(Spain) ESP	Víctor Mollejo	4	0	0+4	0	0	0

=== Goalscorers ===
As of 23 December 2020

Rank	No.	Pos	Nat	Name	La Liga	Copa del Rey	Total
1	9	FW	(Spain)	Ángel	4	1	5
2	7	FW	(Spain)	Jaime Mata	2	0	2
2	23	FW	(Colombia)	Cucho Hernández	2	0	2
4	10	FW	(Turkey)	Enes Ünal	0	1	1
4	15	MF	(Spain)	Marc Cucurella	1	0	1
4	18	MF	(Uruguay)	Mauro Arambarri	1	0	1
4	20	MF	(Serbia)	Nemanja Maksimović	1	0	1
4	22	DF	(Uruguay)	Damián Suárez	1	0	1
Totals					12	2	14
