= 2021–22 Getafe CF season =

Getafe CF
2021–22 season
- Owner: Ángel Torres
- President: Ángel Torres
- Head coach: Míchel (until 4 October); Quique Sánchez Flores (from 6 October)
- Stadium: Coliseum Alfonso Pérez
- La Liga: 15th
- Copa del Rey: Second round
- Top goalscorer: League: Enes Ünal (16); All: Enes Ünal (16)
- Highest home attendance: 8,950 vs Atlético Madrid (21 September 2021)
- Lowest home attendance: 4,721 vs Espanyol (31 October 2021)
- Biggest win: Mollerussa 1–5 Getafe; Getafe 4–0 Cádiz
- Biggest defeat: Atlético Baleares 5–0 Getafe
Home colours	Away colours	Third colours

The 2021–22 season was the 39th season in the existence of Getafe CF and the club's fifth consecutive season in the top flight of Spanish football. In addition to the domestic league, Getafe participated in this season's edition of the Copa del Rey.

== Players ==
=== First-team squad ===
As of 1 February 2022

Note: Flags indicate national team as defined under FIFA eligibility rules; some limited exceptions apply. Players may hold more than one non-FIFA nationality.

No.	Pos.	Nation	Player
1	GK	ESP	Rubén Yáñez
2	DF	TOG	Djené (captain)
3	DF	URU	Erick Cabaco
4	DF	URU	Gastón Álvarez (on loan from Boston River)
5	MF	POR	Florentino Luís (on loan from Benfica)
6	MF	ESP	Gonzalo Villar (on loan from Roma)
7	FW	ESP	Jaime Mata
8	MF	ESP	Vitolo (on loan from Atlético de Madrid)
10	FW	TUR	Enes Ünal
11	MF	ESP	Carles Aleñá
12	FW	ESP	Sandro Ramírez (on loan from Huesca)
13	GK	ESP	David Soria
14	DF	ARG	Jonathan Silva

No.	Pos.	Nation	Player
15	DF	ESP	Jorge Cuenca (on loan from Villarreal)
16	MF	CZE	Jakub Jankto
17	DF	URU	Mathías Olivera
18	MF	URU	Mauro Arambarri
19	MF	TUR	Okay Yokuşlu (on loan from Celta)
20	MF	SRB	Nemanja Maksimović
21	DF	ESP	Juan Iglesias
22	DF	URU	Damián Suárez
23	DF	SRB	Stefan Mitrović
24	MF	ESP	Óscar Rodriguez (on loan from Sevilla)
25	FW	ESP	Borja Mayoral (on loan from Real Madrid)
27	GK	ESP	Diego Conde

=== Reserve team ===
Note: Flags indicate national team as defined under FIFA eligibility rules; some limited exceptions apply. Players may hold more than one non-FIFA nationality.

No.	Pos.	Nation	Player
28	DF	GHA	Koffi Akurugu
29	MF	ESP	Ángel Algobia
30	MF	IRL	John Patrick
31	FW	SEN	Mamor Niang
32	MF	ESP	Pablo Montero

No.	Pos.	Nation	Player
33	MF	ESP	Santi García
34	MF	ESP	Diego López
36	MF	ESP	Totti
37	DF	ESP	Álvaro López
—	DF	ESP	Chinchu

=== Out on loan ===
Note: Flags indicate national team as defined under FIFA eligibility rules; some limited exceptions apply. Players may hold more than one non-FIFA nationality.

No.	Pos.	Nation	Player
—	DF	ESP	Chema (at Eibar until 30 June 2022)
—	DF	ESP	Ignasi Miquel (at Huesca until 30 June 2022)
—	DF	ESP	Miguel Ángel (at Burgos until 30 June 2022)

No.	Pos.	Nation	Player
—	FW	ESP	Darío Poveda (at Huesca until 30 June 2022)
—	FW	ESP	Hugo Duro (at Valencia until 30 June 2022)
—	FW	SCO	Jack Harper (at Racing Santander until 30 June 2022)

== Transfers ==
=== In ===
Date	Player	From	Type	Fee	Ref
30 June 2021	(Spain) Hugo Duro	Real Madrid Castilla	Loan return		
30 June 2021	(Scotland) Jack Harper	Villarreal B	Loan return		
30 June 2021	(Spain) Ignasi Miquel	Leganés	Loan return		
5 July 2021	(Mexico) José Juan Macías	(Mexico) Guadalajara	Loan		
5 July 2021	(Spain) Vitolo	Atlético Madrid	Loan		
6 July 2021	(Serbia) Stefan Mitrović	(France) Strasbourg	Transfer	Undisclosed	
10 July 2021	(Spain) Carles Aleñá	Barcelona	€5,000,000		
2 August 2021	(Spain) Sandro Ramírez	Huesca	Loan		

=== Out ===
Date	Player	To	Type	Fee	Ref
30 June 2021	(Spain) Carles Aleñá	Barcelona	Loan return		
30 June 2021	(Morocco) Sofian Chakla	Villarreal	Loan return		
30 June 2021	(Colombia) Cucho Hernández	(England) Watford	Loan return		
30 June 2021	(Japan) Takefusa Kubo	Real Madrid	Loan return		
30 June 2021	(Senegal) Amath Ndiaye	Mallorca	Transfer	Undisclosed	
30 June 2021	(Spain) Darío Poveda	Atlético Madrid	Loan return		
2 July 2021	(Spain) Ángel Rodríguez	Mallorca	Transfer	Free	

== Pre-season and friendlies ==
Win Draw Loss Fixtures

16 July 2021 Friendly	Getafe	1–0	Ibiza	Cartagena, Spain
10:00 CEST (UTC+2)	Timor 74'	Report		Stadium: La Manga Club Football Center
Note: The match was played in two halves 35 minutes each.

21 July 2021 Friendly	Getafe	2–1	Rennes	Cartagena, Spain
19:00 CEST (UTC+2)	Ünal 17'; Duro 66' (pen.)	Report	Guirassy 57' (pen.)	Stadium: La Manga Club Football Center; Referee: Jorge Díaz Escudero

24 July 2021 Friendly	Getafe	3–0	Atromitos	San Pedro del Pinatar, Spain
10:00 CEST (UTC+2)	Ünal 20', 38'; Timor 48'	Report		Stadium: Pinatar Arena Football Center

30 July 2021 Friendly	Fuenlabrada	0–1	Getafe	Fuenlabrada, Spain
20:00 CEST (UTC+2)		Report	Chema 85'	Stadium: Fernando Torres

31 July 2021 Friendly	Getafe	0–0	Rayo Vallecano	Marbella, Spain
10:00 CEST (UTC+2)		Report		Stadium: Marbella Football Center

4 August 2021 Trofeo Carlos Lapetra	Zaragoza	0–0 (5–6 p)	Getafe	Zaragoza, Spain
21:00 CEST (UTC+2)		Report		Stadium: La Romareda; Referee: Víctor García Verdura
	Penalties
	Adrián (penalty scored); Francés (penalty missed); Carbonell (penalty scored); Serrano (penalty scored); Nieto (penalty scored); Clemente (penalty missed); Puche (penalty missed); Cortés (penalty scored); López (penalty missed)		(penalty scored) Timor; (penalty scored) Miquel; (penalty scored) Ramírez; (penalty scored) Duro; (penalty missed) Niang; (penalty missed) Josete; (penalty missed) Cabaco; (penalty scored) Iglesias; (penalty scored) Chema

7 August 2021 Friendly	Brighton & Hove Albion	0–2	Getafe	Falmer, England
19:00 BST (UTC+1)	Maupay (yellow card) 44'	Report	Cabaco 22'; Aleñá (yellow card) 30'; Timor 72'	Stadium: Falmer Stadium; Referee: John Brooks

== Competitions ==
=== Overall record ===
Competition	First match	Last match	Starting round	Final position	Record							
Competition	First match	Last match	Starting round	Final position	Pld	W	D	L	GF	GA	GD	Win %
La Liga	13 August 2021	22 May 2022	Matchday 1	15th	38	8	15	15	33	41	−8	21.05
Copa del Rey	30 November 2021	16 December 2021	First round	Second round	2	1	0	1	5	6	−1	50.00
Total					40	9	15	16	38	47	−9	22.50

Source: Soccerway

=== La Liga ===
==== League table ====
Pos	Team	Pld	W	D	L	GF	GA	GD	Pts
13	Elche	38	11	9	18	40	52	−12	42 (Note: Head-to-head points: Rayo Vallecano 9, Elche 7, Espanyol 1.)
14	Espanyol	38	10	12	16	40	53	−13	42
15	Getafe	38	8	15	15	33	41	−8	39 (Note: Head-to-head points: Getafe 8, Mallorca 5, Cádiz 2.)
16	Mallorca	38	10	9	19	36	63	−27	39
17	Cádiz	38	8	15	15	35	51	−16	39

Source: LaLiga Santander
Rules for classification: 1) Points; 2) Head-to-head points; 3) Head-to-head goal difference; 4) Goal difference; 5) Goals scored; 6) Fair-play points (Note: Head-to-head record is used only after all the matches between the teams in question have been played)

==== Results summary ====
Overall								Home						Away					
Pld	W	D	L	GF	GA	GD	Pts	W	D	L	GF	GA	GD	W	D	L	GF	GA	GD
38	8	15	15	33	41	−8	39	7	7	5	21	15	+6	1	8	10	12	26	−14

Source: La Liga

==== Results by round ====
Round	1	2	3	4	5	6	7	8	9	10	11	12	13	14	15	16	17	18	19	20	21	22	23	24	25	26	27	28	29	30	31	32	33	34	35	36	37	38
Ground	A	H	A	H	A	H	A	H	A	H	A	H	A	H	A	H	A	H	H	A	H	A	H	A	A	H	A	H	A	H	A	H	A	H	H	A	H	A
Result	L	L	L	L	L	L	L	D	D	L	D	W	L	W	D	D	D	W	W	L	W	D	W	L	D	D	L	D	D	W	L	L	W	D	D	D	D	L
Position	17	18	19	19	19	19	20	20	20	20	20	20	20	19	19	19	19	16	16	16	16	16	15	16	15	15	15	15	15	14	14	15	15	15	15	15	14	15

Source: La Liga
A = Away; H = Home; W = Win; D = Draw; L = Loss

==== Matches ====
The league fixtures were announced on 30 June 2021.

13 August 2021 1	Valencia	1–0	Getafe	Valencia
21:00 CEST (UTC+2)	Guillamón (red card) 3'; Soler 11' (pen.), (yellow card) 50'; Wass (yellow card) 13'; Gómez (yellow card) 58'; Gayà (yellow card) 70'; Jason (yellow card) 90+2'; Alderete (yellow card) 90+7'	Report	Olivera (yellow card) 31'; Cabaco (yellow card) 38' (yellow-red card) 76'	Stadium: Mestalla; Attendance: 9,868; Referee: Jesús Gil Manzano

23 August 2021 2	Getafe	0–1	Sevilla	Getafe
20:00 CEST (UTC+2)	Arambarri (yellow card) 16'; Cabaco (yellow card) 44'; Suárez (yellow card) 70'	Report	Gómez (yellow card) 42'; Fernando (yellow card) 86'; Lamela 90+3'	Stadium: Coliseum Alfonso Pérez; Attendance: 4,810; Referee: José María Sánchez Martínez

29 August 2021 3	Barcelona	2–1	Getafe	Barcelona
17:00 CEST (UTC+2)	Roberto 2'; Araújo (yellow card) 27'; Depay 30', (yellow card) 62'; Lenglet (yellow card) 86'	Report	Sandro 19'; Aleñá (yellow card) 21'	Stadium: Camp Nou; Attendance: 26,543; Referee: Pablo González Fuertes

13 September 2021 4	Getafe	0–1	Elche	Getafe
20:00 CEST (UTC+2)	Suárez (yellow card) 52'; Sandro (yellow card) 85'	Report	Verdú (yellow card) 19'; Mascarell (yellow card) 24'; Palacios (yellow card) 63'; Pérez 69'	Stadium: Coliseum Alfonso Pérez; Attendance: 6,856; Referee: Mario Melero López

18 September 2021 5	Rayo Vallecano	3–0	Getafe	Madrid
14:00 CEST (UTC+2)	Bébé (yellow card) 7'; Trejo 9' (pen.); Saveljich (yellow card) 42'; Comesaña (yellow card) 45+3'; F. García (yellow card) 46'; Ciss 78', (yellow card) 90+4'; Falcao 81'; Balliu (yellow card) 85'	Report	Djené (yellow card) 8'; Chema (yellow card) 18'; Suárez (yellow card) 38'; Olivera (yellow card) 41'; Aleñá (yellow card) 66'; Ünal (yellow card) 83', (penalty missed) 86'; Macías (yellow card) 90+5'	Stadium: Campo de Fútbol de Vallecas; Attendance: 3,280; Referee: Adrián Cordero Vega

21 September 2021 6	Getafe	1–2	Atlético Madrid	Getafe
19:30 CEST (UTC+2)	Mitrović 45'; Mata (yellow card) 65'; Aleñá (yellow card) 66', (red card) 74'; Maksimović (yellow card) 90'; Cuenca (yellow card) 90+5'	Report	Suárez (yellow card) 22', (goal) 78', 90'; Herrera (yellow card) 64'; Giménez (yellow card) 66'; Carrasco (yellow card) 90+3'; Cunha (yellow card) 90+7'	Stadium: Coliseum Alfonso Pérez; Attendance: 8,950; Referee: Guillermo Cuadra Fernández

26 September 2021 7	Real Betis	2–0	Getafe	Seville
21:00 CEST (UTC+2)	Willian José 14', 55'; Carvalho (yellow card) 82'	Report	Timor (yellow card) 35'; Sandro (yellow card) 60'; Silva (yellow card) 90+3'	Stadium: Benito Villamarín; Attendance: 29,825; Referee: Santiago Jaime Latre

3 October 2021 8	Getafe	1–1	Real Sociedad	Getafe
18:30 CEST (UTC+2)	Djené (yellow card) 37'; Sandro 40'; Soria (yellow card) 66'; Aleñá (yellow card) 72'; Ünal (yellow card) 86'	Report	Merino (yellow card) 43'; Oyarzabal 68'; Gorosabel (yellow card) 74'	Stadium: Coliseum Alfonso Pérez; Attendance: 8,463; Referee: Jorge Figueroa Vázquez

16 October 2021 9	Levante	0–0	Getafe	Valencia
18:30 CEST (UTC+2)	Miramón (yellow card) 39'; Morales (yellow card) 58'; Clerc (yellow card) 64'	Report	Timor (yellow card) 29'; Olivera (yellow card) 49'; Arambarri (yellow card) 68'	Stadium: Ciutat de València; Attendance: 14,551; Referee: Mario Melero López

25 October 2021 10	Getafe	0–3	Celta Vigo	Getafe
21:00 CEST (UTC+2)	Djené (red card) 63'; Olivera (yellow card) 80'; Suárez (yellow card) 81'; Chema (red card) 81'	Report	Aidoo (yellow card) 42'; Mina 55', 73'; Aspas 58'; Murillo (yellow card) 83'	Stadium: Coliseum Alfonso Pérez; Attendance: 7,630; Referee: Juan Martínez Munuera

28 October 2021 11	Granada	1–1	Getafe	Granada
20:00 CEST (UTC+2)	Montoro (yellow card) 45'; Suárez (penalty missed) 78'; Molina 90+7'	Report	Ünal 36', (yellow card) 77'; Nyom (yellow card) 60'; Maksimović (yellow card) 78'; Soria (yellow card) 80'	Stadium: Nuevo Los Cármenes; Attendance: 13,651; Referee: Adrián Cordero Vega

31 October 2021 12	Getafe	2–1	Espanyol	Getafe
18:30 CET (UTC+1)	Mitrović (yellow card) 13'; Ünal (yellow card) 21', (goal) 31', 56'; Djené (yellow card) 62'; Maksimović (yellow card) 66'; Silva (yellow card) 70'; Suárez (yellow card) 90+2'; Mata (yellow card) 90+7'	Report	Darder (yellow card) 27'; Gómez 38'; Puado (yellow card) 69'; Pedrosa (yellow card) 88'; Bare (yellow card) 90+4'	Stadium: Coliseum Alfonso Pérez; Attendance: 4,721; Referee: Alejandro Muñiz Ruiz

7 November 2021 13	Villarreal	1–0	Getafe	Villarreal
14:00 CET (UTC+1)	Trigueros 10'; Albiol (yellow card) 70'	Report	Mata (yellow card) 36'; Arambarri (yellow card) 52'	Stadium: Estadio de la Cerámica; Attendance: 13,504; Referee: Jesús Gil Manzano

21 November 2021 14	Getafe	4–0	Cádiz	Getafe
14:00 CET (UTC+1)	Olivera 7'; Sandro (yellow card) 51'; Cuenca 60'; Ünal 81'; Mata 90+4'; Mitrović (yellow card) 90+5'	Report	Perea (yellow card) 58'; Fernández (yellow card) 62'; Haroyan (yellow card) 69'; Cala (yellow card) 78'	Stadium: Coliseum Alfonso Pérez; Attendance: 8,825; Referee: Ricardo de Burgos Bengoetxea

27 November 2021 15	Mallorca	0–0	Getafe	Palma
18:30 CET (UTC+1)	Mboula (yellow card) 60'; Russo (yellow card) 67'; Abdón (yellow card) 90+3'	Report		Stadium: Visit Mallorca Stadium; Attendance: 8,635; Referee: Santiago Jaime Latre

6 December 2021 16	Getafe	0–0	Athletic Bilbao	Getafe
21:00 CET (UTC+1)	Djené (yellow card) 15'; Mata (yellow card) 90+5'	Report	Morcillo (yellow card) 90+4'	Stadium: Coliseum Alfonso Pérez; Attendance: 9,176; Referee: Jorge Figueroa Vázquez

11 December 2021 17	Alavés	1–1	Getafe	Vitoria-Gasteiz
16:15 CET (UTC+1)	Aguirregabiria (yellow card) 45+4'; Joselu 86'; Lejeune (yellow card) 87' (yellow-red card) 90+2'; Rioja (yellow card) 88'	Report	Ünal 20'; Cuenca (yellow card) 41'; Arambarri (yellow card) 45+1'; Mata (yellow card) 69'; Soria (yellow card) 81'	Stadium: Mendizorrotza; Attendance: 10,065; Referee: César Soto Grado

19 December 2021 18	Getafe	1–0	Osasuna	Getafe
18:30 CET (UTC+1)	Sandro (yellow card) 26'; Suárez (yellow card) 45'; Djené (yellow card) 50'; Poveda 90+3'	Report	Ávila (yellow card) 72'	Stadium: Coliseum Alfonso Pérez; Attendance: 8,126; Referee: José Luis Munuera Montero

2 January 2022 19	Getafe	1–0	Real Madrid	Getafe
14:00 CET (UTC+1)	Ünal 9'; Suárez (yellow card) 56'; Arambarri (yellow card) 82'; Olivera (yellow card) 90+6'	Report	Rodrygo (yellow card) 21'; Casemiro (yellow card) 87'	Stadium: Coliseum Alfonso Pérez; Attendance: 11,890; Referee: Mario Melero López

9 January 2022 20	Sevilla	1–0	Getafe	Seville
16:15 CET (UTC+1)	Mir 22'; Ocampos (yellow card) 37'	Report	Djené (yellow card) 29'; Silva (yellow card) 65'; Florentino (yellow card) 84'	Stadium: Ramón Sánchez Pizjuán; Attendance: 30,801; Referee: Juan Martínez Munuera

20 January 2022 21	Getafe	4–2	Granada	Getafe
19:00 CET (UTC+1)	Sandro 10', (yellow card) 72'; Ünal (yellow card) 29', (goal) 48'; Maksimović 63'; Arambarri (yellow card) 86'; Mayoral 87'	Report	Suárez 13', 78'; Torrente (yellow card) 32'; Puertas (yellow card) 54'; Milla (yellow card) 67'; Molina (yellow card) 71'	Stadium: Coliseum Alfonso Pérez; Attendance: 7,634; Referee: Isidro Díaz de Mera Escuderos

23 January 2022 22	Real Sociedad	0–0	Getafe	San Sebastián
18:30 CET (UTC+1)	Zubeldia (yellow card) 51'	Report	Cuenca (yellow card) 90'	Stadium: Anoeta; Attendance: 27,638; Referee: José Luis Munuera Montero

4 February 2022 23	Getafe	3–0	Levante	Getafe
21:00 CET (UTC+1)	Ünal 1', 29'; Arambarri (yellow card) 56'; Mitrović (yellow card) 66'; Suárez (yellow card) 77'; Aleñá 90+4'; Cuenca (yellow card) 90+6'	Report	Duarte (yellow card) 17'; Roger (yellow card) 58'; Son (yellow card) 90+4'	Stadium: Coliseum Alfonso Pérez; Attendance: 8,475; Referee: Alejandro Muñiz Ruiz

12 February 2022 24	Atlético Madrid	4–3	Getafe	Madrid
21:00 CET (UTC+1)	Savić (yellow card) 3'; Suárez (penalty missed) 9', (yellow card) 45+2'; Lecomte (yellow card) 13'; Correa 19', 45+4'; Cunha 27'; Koke (yellow card) 45'; Felipe (red card) 58'; Hermoso 89'	Report	Djené (yellow card) 15'; Maksimović (yellow card) 21'; Arambarri (yellow card) 22'; Mayoral 30'; Ünal 37' (pen.), 42' (pen.); Silva (yellow card) 90+5'	Stadium: Wanda Metropolitano; Attendance: 49,375; Referee: Ricardo de Burgos Bengoetxea

19 February 2022 25	Cádiz	1–1	Getafe	Cádiz
18:30 CET (UTC+1)	Negredo (yellow card) 6', (goal) 45+2'; Espino (yellow card) 32'; Alcaraz (yellow card) 35'	Report	Mayoral 6' (pen.); Yokuşlu (yellow card) 19'; Arambarri (yellow card) 51'; Suárez (yellow card) 82'; Jankto (yellow card) 90+4'	Stadium: Nuevo Mirandilla; Attendance: 15,948; Referee: Javier Alberola Rojas

26 February 2022 26	Getafe	2–2	Alavés	Getafe
16:15 CET (UTC+1)	Cuenca (red card) 32'; Suárez (yellow card) 43'; Aleñá (yellow card) 49'; Ünal 55', 72'	Report	Loum (yellow card) 39'; Méndez (yellow card) 44', (goal) 56'; Escalante 45+1', (yellow card) 76'; Laguardia (yellow card) 58'	Stadium: Coliseum Alfonso Pérez; Attendance: 7,720; Referee: Santiago Jaime Latre

5 March 2022 27	Espanyol	2–0	Getafe	Cornellà de Llobregat
16:15 CET (UTC+1)	Cabrera 17', (yellow card) 64'; Cabaco 27' (o.g.); Gil (yellow card) 40'; Vilhena (yellow card) 42'; Di. López (yellow card) 43'; Herrera (yellow card) 56'; Darder (yellow card) 72'	Report	Mitrović (yellow card) 2'; Ünal (yellow card) 32'; Óscar (yellow card) 56'; Djené (yellow card) 72'; Cabaco (yellow card) 78'	Stadium: RCDE Stadium; Attendance: 18,519; Referee: Adrián Cordero Vega

12 March 2022 28	Getafe	0–0	Valencia	Getafe
21:00 CET (UTC+1)	Sandro (yellow card) 39'; Aleñá (yellow card) 49'; Mayoral (yellow card) 73'; Mata (yellow card) 80'; Maksimović (yellow card) 90+2'; Olivera (yellow card) 90+4'	Report	Alderete (yellow card) 31'; Guillamón (yellow card) 82'; Moriba (yellow card) 87'; Foulquier (yellow card) 90+4'; Costa (yellow card) 90+5'	Stadium: Coliseum Alfonso Pérez; Attendance: 10,349; Referee: Guillermo Cuadra Fernández

18 March 2022 29	Athletic Bilbao	1–1	Getafe	Bilbao
21:00 CET (UTC+1)	Berchiche 29'; Vesga (yellow card) 79'; De Marcos (yellow card) 88'; Petxarroman (yellow card) 90+3'; Yeray (yellow card) 90+6'	Report	Ünal 3', (yellow card) 32'; Mitrović (yellow card) 25'; Cuenca (red card) 65'; Djené (yellow card) 86'; Jankto (red card) 90'; Mata (yellow card) 90+3'; Suárez (yellow card) 90+7'	Stadium: San Mamés; Attendance: 37,367; Referee: Jesús Gil Manzano

2 April 2022 30	Getafe	1–0	Mallorca	Getafe
14:00 CEST (UTC+2)	Suárez (yellow card) 19'; Ünal (yellow card) 40', (penalty missed) 65'; Sandro (yellow card) 40'; Arambarri (yellow card) 45'; Mayoral 82', (yellow card) 82'	Report	Rodríguez (yellow card) 29'; González (yellow card) 41'; Russo (yellow card) 41' (yellow-red card) 63'; Sevilla (yellow card) 41'; Maffeo (yellow card) 89'	Stadium: Coliseum Alfonso Pérez; Attendance: 8,946; Referee: Antonio Mateu Lahoz

9 April 2022 31	Real Madrid	2–0	Getafe	Madrid
21:00 CEST (UTC+2)	Casemiro 38', (yellow card) 44'; Valverde (yellow card) 45'; Vázquez 68'	Report	Olivera (yellow card) 76'; Djené (yellow card) 79'	Stadium: Santiago Bernabéu; Attendance: 50,740; Referee: César Soto Grado

16 April 2022 32	Getafe	1–2	Villarreal	Getafe
21:00 CEST (UTC+2)	Suárez (yellow card) 20'; Arambarri (yellow card) 60'; Ünal 63'	Report	Gerard 7'; Trigueros 16'	Stadium: Coliseum Alfonso Pérez; Attendance: 9,647; Referee: Pablo González Fuertes

20 April 2022 33	Celta Vigo	0–2	Getafe	Vigo
20:00 CEST (UTC+2)	Solari (yellow card) 65'; Murillo (yellow card) 74'	Report	Cuenca (yellow card) 9'; Mayoral 23', 52', (yellow card) 38'; Óscar (yellow card) 48'; Florentino (yellow card) 56'; Olivera (yellow card) 64'	Stadium: Balaídos; Attendance: 9,934; Referee: Santiago Jaime Latre

2 May 2022 34	Getafe	0–0	Real Betis	Getafe
21:00 CEST (UTC+2)	Mitrović (yellow card) 31'	Report	Ruibal (yellow card) 51'	Stadium: Coliseum Alfonso Pérez; Attendance: 9,916; Referee: Adrián Cordero Vega

8 May 2022 35	Getafe	0–0	Rayo Vallecano	Getafe
14:00 CEST (UTC+2)	Olivera (yellow card) 37'; Arambarri (yellow card) 49'	Report	Trejo (yellow card) 27'; Valentín (yellow card) 39'; Suárez (yellow card) 42'; Ciss (yellow card) 66'	Stadium: Coliseum Alfonso Pérez; Attendance: 10,125; Referee: Mario Melero López

11 May 2022 36	Osasuna	1–1	Getafe	Pamplona
19:00 CEST (UTC+2)	Oier 9'; Ávila (yellow card) 14'; García (yellow card) 38'	Report	Torró 20' (o.g.); Cuenca (yellow card) 45+2'; Mitrović (yellow card) 72' (yellow-red card) 89'; Arambarri (yellow card) 79'; Soria (yellow card) 81'	Stadium: El Sadar; Attendance: 17,850; Referee: Alejandro Muñiz Ruiz

15 May 2022 37	Getafe	0–0	Barcelona	Getafe
18:30 CEST (UTC+2)	Olivera (yellow card) 87'	Report	Lenglet (yellow card) 35'; Busquets (yellow card) 57'	Stadium: Coliseum Alfonso Pérez; Attendance: 13,072; Referee: Jesús Gil Manzano

22 May 2022 38	Elche	3–1	Getafe	Elche
18:30 CEST (UTC+2)	Olaza 37'; Bigas (yellow card) 51'; Gumbau (yellow card) 62'; Pérez 84', 90+2'	Report	Ünal 33'; Mitrović (yellow card) 36'; Djené (yellow card) 87'	Stadium: Estadio Manuel Martínez Valero; Attendance: 21,266; Referee: Guillermo Cuadra Fernández

=== Copa del Rey ===
30 November 2021 First round	Mollerussa	1–5	Getafe	Mollerussa
21:00 CET (UTC+1)	Puiggròs 4'; Fabregat (yellow card) 36'; Bosch (yellow card) 51'; Graells (yellow card) 63'; Trota (red card) 88'; Ars (yellow card) 90'; Litwin (yellow card) 90+5'	Report	Mata 19' (pen.), 52' (pen.), 57'; Akurugu (yellow card) 49'; Sandro 58'; Poveda 75'	Stadium: Camp Municipal; Referee: Alejandro Hernández Hernández

16 December 2021 Second round	Atlético Baleares	5–0	Getafe	Palma
21:00 CET (UTC+1)	Orfila 6', 44'; Dioni 68'; Martínez 70'; Vinicius Tanque 89'	Report		Stadium: Estadio Balear; Referee: Javier Alberola Rojas

== Statistics ==
=== Goalscorers ===
As of 20 April 2022

Rank	Player	La Liga	Copa del Rey	Total
1	(Turkey) Enes Ünal	15	0	15
2	(Spain) Borja Mayoral	6	0	6
3	(Spain) Jaime Mata	1	3	4
3	(Spain) Sandro Ramírez	3	1	4
5	(Spain) Carles Aleñá	1	0	1
5	(Spain) Jorge Cuenca	1	0	1
5	(Serbia) Nemanja Maksimović	1	0	1
5	(Serbia) Stefan Mitrović	1	0	1
5	(Uruguay) Mathías Olivera	1	0	1
5	(Spain) Darío Poveda	0	1	1
Own goals		0	0	0
Total		31	5	36
