= Amankwaa Akurugu =

Ghanaian footballer

Personal information
- Full name: Emmanuel Amankwaa Akurugu
- Date of birth: 20 November 2001 (age 24)
- Place of birth: Accra, Ghana
- Height: 1.74 m (5 ft 9 in)
- Position: Left back

Youth career
- Ashaiman School

Senior career*
Years	Team	Apps	(Gls)
2020–2023	Getafe B	56	(2)
2021–2022	Getafe	4	(0)
2023	Cornellà	12	(0)
2024	Melilla	7	(0)
- * Club domestic league appearances and goals as of 5 May 2024

Emmanuel Amankwaa Akurugu (born 20 November 2001), sometimes known as Koffi or Kofi, is a Ghanaian footballer who plays as a left back.

== Career ==
Born in Accra, Akurugu joined Getafe CF in 2020, from hometown side Ashaiman School. In Spain, he began his sports career in the talent search project of La Moraleja C.F. who bet on him and his abilities as a footballer. Initially assigned to the reserves, he made his senior debut on 18 October 2020, starting in a 1–2 Segunda División B home loss against CF Rayo Majadahonda.

Akurugu made his first team – and La Liga – debut on 22 April 2021, coming on as a half-time substitute for Marc Cucurella in a 2–5 away loss against FC Barcelona.

== Career statistics ==
=== Club ===
As of match played 9 May 2021

Appearances and goals by club, season and competition
Club	Season	League			National Cup		Continental		Other		Total	
Club	Season	Division	Apps	Goals	Apps	Goals	Apps	Goals	Apps	Goals	Apps	Goals
Getafe B	2020–21	Segunda División B	18	1	—		—		—		18	1
Getafe	2020–21	La Liga	1	0	0	0	—		—		1	0
Getafe	2021–22	La Liga	3	0	1	0	—		—		4	0
Getafe	Total		4	0	1	0	—		—		5	0
Career total			22	1	1	0	0	0	0	0	23	1
