= Rubén Yáñez =

Spanish footballer

Personal information
- Full name: Orlando Rubén Yáñez Alabart
- Date of birth: 12 October 1993 (age 33)
- Place of birth: Blanes, Spain
- Height: 1.90 m (6 ft 3 in)
- Position: Goalkeeper

Team information
- Current team: Sporting Gijón
- Number: 1

Youth career
- 2006–2009: Lloret
- 2009–2010: Girona
- 2010–2012: Real Madrid

Senior career*
Years	Team	Apps	(Gls)
2012–2013	Real Madrid C	26	(0)
2013–2015	Real Madrid B	34	(0)
2015–2017	Real Madrid	0	(0)
2017–2022	Getafe	10	(0)
2017–2019	→ Cádiz (loan)	0	(0)
2019–2020	→ Huesca (loan)	6	(0)
2022–2023	Málaga	29	(0)
2023–	Sporting Gijón	117	(0)

International career^{‡}
2013	Spain U20	1	(0)
- * Club domestic league appearances and goals as of 6 June 2026 ‡ National team caps and goals as of 6 July 2013

Orlando Rubén Yáñez Alabart (born 12 October 1993), known as Rubén Yáñez (Spanish pronunciation: [ruˈβeɲ ˈɟʝaɲeθ]), is a Spanish professional footballer who plays as a goalkeeper for Sporting de Gijón.

== Club career ==
=== Real Madrid ===
Born in Blanes, Girona, Catalonia, Yáñez joined Real Madrid's youth academy from local side Girona FC in 2010, aged 17. He made his senior debut in the 2012–13 season, playing 26 games for the C-team in Segunda División B. In July 2013, Yáñez was promoted to the reserves, in Segunda División.

On 8 September 2013, Yáñez made his professional debut, starting in a 0–1 home loss against CD Mirandés. Mainly a backup to Fernando Pacheco during the campaign, he appeared in four matches as his side suffered relegation.

After Pacheco's promotion to the main squad, Yáñez was an undisputed starter for the reserves in 2014–15, contributing with 30 appearances. On 5 August 2015 he was promoted to the first team by new manager Rafael Benítez, and made his debut four days later, coming on as a late substitute for Kiko Casilla in a 0–0 friendly draw against Vålerenga Fotball.

Yáñez was the third option behind Keylor Navas and Casilla when the team won the 2015–16 UEFA Champions League. He did not make an appearance during the season when Madrid won the 2016–17 La Liga and the 2016–17 UEFA Champions League. With 21 total appearances on the substitute bench across two years, he only played one official match for Real Madrid on 30 November 2016, again as a late substitute for Casilla in the last 15 minutes of an eventual 6–1 win (13–2 aggregate) against Cultural Leonesa in the Round of 32 of Copa del Rey.

=== Getafe ===
On 17 August 2017, Yáñez signed a four-year deal with Getafe CF, being immediately loaned to Cádiz CF for one year. He made only six appearances during his time in Andalusia, all in the Copa del Rey.

On 22 August 2019, after spending the whole 2018–19 season as a third-choice, Yáñez joined SD Huesca on a one-year loan deal. He contributed with eight appearances overall for the side, acting as a backup to Álvaro Fernández as his side achieved promotion to the top tier as champions.

Yáñez finally made his debut for Getafe on 17 December 2020 in a 2–1 win at CD Anaitasuna in the first round of the cup. Three days later he made his La Liga bow in a 2–0 win at former club Cádiz, to finally play in the top flight at the age of 27. After ten consecutive games in all competitions – including once David Soria had returned from injury – he lost his place to him in February.

On 15 July 2022, Yáñez terminated his contract with Getafe.

=== Málaga ===
On 15 July 2022, hours after leaving Getafe, Yáñez signed a three-year deal with Málaga CF in the second division. Second-choice to Manolo Reina, he made his debut on 3 November in the 14th game of the season, a 2–1 loss at FC Cartagena. On 30 June of the following year, after the club's relegation, he left after activating an exit clause on his contract.

=== Sporting Gijón ===
On 12 July 2023, free agent Yáñez signed a three-year contract with Sporting de Gijón, still in division two.

== Career statistics ==
=== Club ===
As of match played 6 June 2026.

Appearances and goals by club, season and competition
Club	Season	League			National Cup		Europe		Other		Total	
Club	Season	Division	Apps	Goals	Apps	Goals	Apps	Goals	Apps	Goals	Apps	Goals
Real Madrid C	2012–13	Segunda División B	26	0	—		—		—		26	0
Real Madrid Castilla	2013–14	Segunda División	4	0	—		—		—		4	0
Real Madrid Castilla	2014–15	Segunda División B	30	0	—		—		—		30	0
Real Madrid Castilla	Total		34	0	—		—		—		34	0
Real Madrid	2015–16	La Liga	0	0	0	0	0	0	—		0	0
Real Madrid	2016–17	La Liga	0	0	1	0	0	0	0	0	1	0
Real Madrid	Total		0	0	1	0	0	0	0	0	1	0
Getafe	2018–19	La Liga	0	0	0	0	—		—		0	0
Getafe	2020–21	La Liga	10	0	1	0	—		—		11	0
Getafe	2021–22	La Liga	0	0	2	0	—		—		2	0
Getafe	Total		10	0	3	0	—		—		13	0
Cádiz (loan)	2017–18	Segunda División	0	0	6	0	—		—		6	0
Huesca (loan)	2019–20	Segunda División	6	0	2	0	—		—		8	0
Málaga	2022–23	Segunda División	29	0	0	0	—		—		29	0
Sporting Gijón	2023–24	Segunda División	38	0	0	0	—		2	0	40	0
Sporting Gijón	2024–25	Segunda División	39	0	0	0	—		—		39	0
Sporting Gijón	2025–26	Segunda División	40	0	0	0	—		—		40	0
Sporting Gijón	Total		117	0	0	0	—		2	0	119	0
Career total			222	0	12	0	0	0	2	0	236	0

== Honours ==
Real Madrid

- La Liga: 2016–17
- UEFA Super Cup: 2016
- FIFA Club World Cup: 2016
- UEFA Champions League: 2016–17

Huesca

- Segunda División: 2019–20
