= David Soria =

Spanish footballer

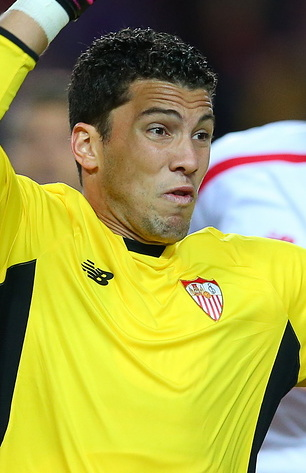
- Soria with Sevilla in 2016

Personal information
- Full name: David Soria Solís
- Date of birth: 4 April 1993 (age 33)
- Place of birth: Madrid, Spain
- Height: 1.92 m (6 ft 4 in)
- Position: Goalkeeper

Team information
- Current team: Getafe
- Number: 13

Youth career
- 2001–2003: Carabanchel
- 2003–2008: Real Madrid
- 2008–2009: Atlético Madrid
- 2009–2012: Real Madrid

Senior career*
Years	Team	Apps	(Gls)
2013	Sevilla C	14	(0)
2013–2015	Sevilla B	54	(0)
2015–2018	Sevilla	16	(0)
2018–	Getafe	304	(0)
- * Club domestic league appearances and goals as of 23:58, 1 November 2026 (UTC)

David Soria Solís (born 4 April 1993) is a Spanish professional footballer who plays as a goalkeeper for La Liga club Getafe.

== Club career ==
=== Early career ===
Born in Madrid, Soria finished his youth career with Real Madrid. Following his release, he moved to England and trialled at Leicester City, who let him go after an injury on his first day; he was then discarded by Birmingham City after six weeks because of their salary cap, and ended his trial at Stoke City due to feeling discouraged.

On his return to Spain, Soria failed to gain a contract at Real Betis B because of a change of coach, and was not considered experienced enough for Abelardo Fernández's Sporting de Gijón in the Segunda División. He subsequently trained at CD Canillas to maintain his fitness, but did not make his debut for the club; at the time, he also thought about retiring from football.

=== Sevilla ===
Soria joined Sevilla FC in January 2013, and made his debut as a senior with the C team in the Tercera División. He was promoted to the reserves in 2013, and played 16 matches in his first season in the Segunda División B, adding 34 in the following.

Soria was also an unused substitute seven times for the main squad in La Liga in 2014–15, his first being a 2–0 home win against Getafe CF on 14 September when he featured in place of Mariano Barbosa as reserve. He also sat on the bench for one match of their victorious campaign in the UEFA Europa League, a 2–1 quarter-final first leg victory over FC Zenit Saint Petersburg at the Ramón Sánchez-Pizjuán Stadium on 16 April.

In September 2015, Marca predicted that Soria could break into Sevilla's first team due to the poor form of their goalkeepers Beto and Sergio Rico. Manager Unai Emery gave him his debut on 2 December, a 3–0 away defeat of UD Logroñés in the last 32 of the Copa del Rey.

Soria was the undisputed goalkeeper in the knockout stage of the Europa League, keeping a clean sheet in a 3–0 home win over Molde FK on his continental debut on 18 February 2016. He renewed his contract with the Andalusians on 5 April 2016, signing until 2019.

In the quarter-final second leg against compatriots Athletic Bilbao, on 14 April 2016, Soria made an error to allow Aritz Aduriz to score, but saved from Beñat Etxebarria in an eventual penalty shootout victory. He was also in goal for the final in Basel, a 3–1 victory against Liverpool on 18 May.

On 20 May 2017, as Sevilla had already secured the fourth place in the league, Soria first appeared in the Spanish top flight, in a 5–0 home rout of relegated CA Osasuna.

=== Getafe ===
On 13 July 2018, fellow top-tier club Getafe reached an agreement with Sevilla for the transfer of Soria, who signed a four-year contract. He made his debut in the season opener, a 2–0 loss at Real Madrid on 20 August, and missed just one game as the team from the Community of Madrid finished a best-ever fifth, two points away from a Champions League debut.

In 2019–20, Soria was the only player in the league to feature in every minute of the season, as Getafe missed out on European qualification due to an added-time defeat on the final day. In December 2020, he lost his place to Rubén Yáñez, who had impressed while he was absent with a muscular injury; he recovered his position in February.

Soria continued to take part in all league matches the following campaigns. In December 2025, he was awarded the La Liga Save of the Month for the previous month after denying Atlético Madrid's Nicolás González twice in the fifth minute of the game at the Estadio Coliseum.

On 17 May 2026, Soria made his 300th appearance for the club in a 1–0 away defeat against Elche CF. A month later, he signed an extension until 2030.

== Career statistics ==
As of match played 1 November 2026

Appearances and goals by club, season and competition
Club	Season	League			Copa del Rey		Europe		Total	
Club	Season	Division	Apps	Goals	Apps	Goals	Apps	Goals	Apps	Goals
Sevilla B	2013–14	Segunda División B	16	0	—		—		16	0
Sevilla B	2014–15	Segunda División B	34	0	—		—		34	0
Sevilla B	2015–16	Segunda División B	4	0	—		—		4	0
Sevilla B	Total		54	0	—		—		54	0
Sevilla	2015–16	La Liga	0	0	4	0	9 (Note: Appearances in UEFA Europa League)	0	13	0
Sevilla	2016–17	La Liga	1	0	2	0	—		3	0
Sevilla	2017–18	La Liga	15	0	3	0	2 (Note: Appearances in UEFA Champions League)	0	20	0
Sevilla	Total		16	0	9	0	11	0	36	0
Getafe	2018–19	La Liga	37	0	0	0	—		37	0
Getafe	2019–20	La Liga	38	0	0	0	4	0	42	0
Getafe	2020–21	La Liga	28	0	1	0	—		29	0
Getafe	2021–22	La Liga	38	0	0	0	—		38	0
Getafe	2022–23	La Liga	38	0	1	0	—		39	0
Getafe	2023–24	La Liga	38	0	2	0	—		40	0
Getafe	2024–25	La Liga	38	0	0	0	—		38	0
Getafe	2025–26	La Liga	38	0	0	0	—		38	0
Getafe	2026–27	La Liga	11	0	0	0	4 (Note: Appearances in UEFA Conference League)	0	15	0
Getafe	Total		304	0	4	0	8	0	316	0
Career total			374	0	13	0	19	0	406	0

== Honours ==
Sevilla

- UEFA Europa League: 2015–16

Individual

- UEFA Europa League Squad of the Season: 2015–16
