= John Patrick (footballer, born 2003) =

Irish footballer (born 2003)

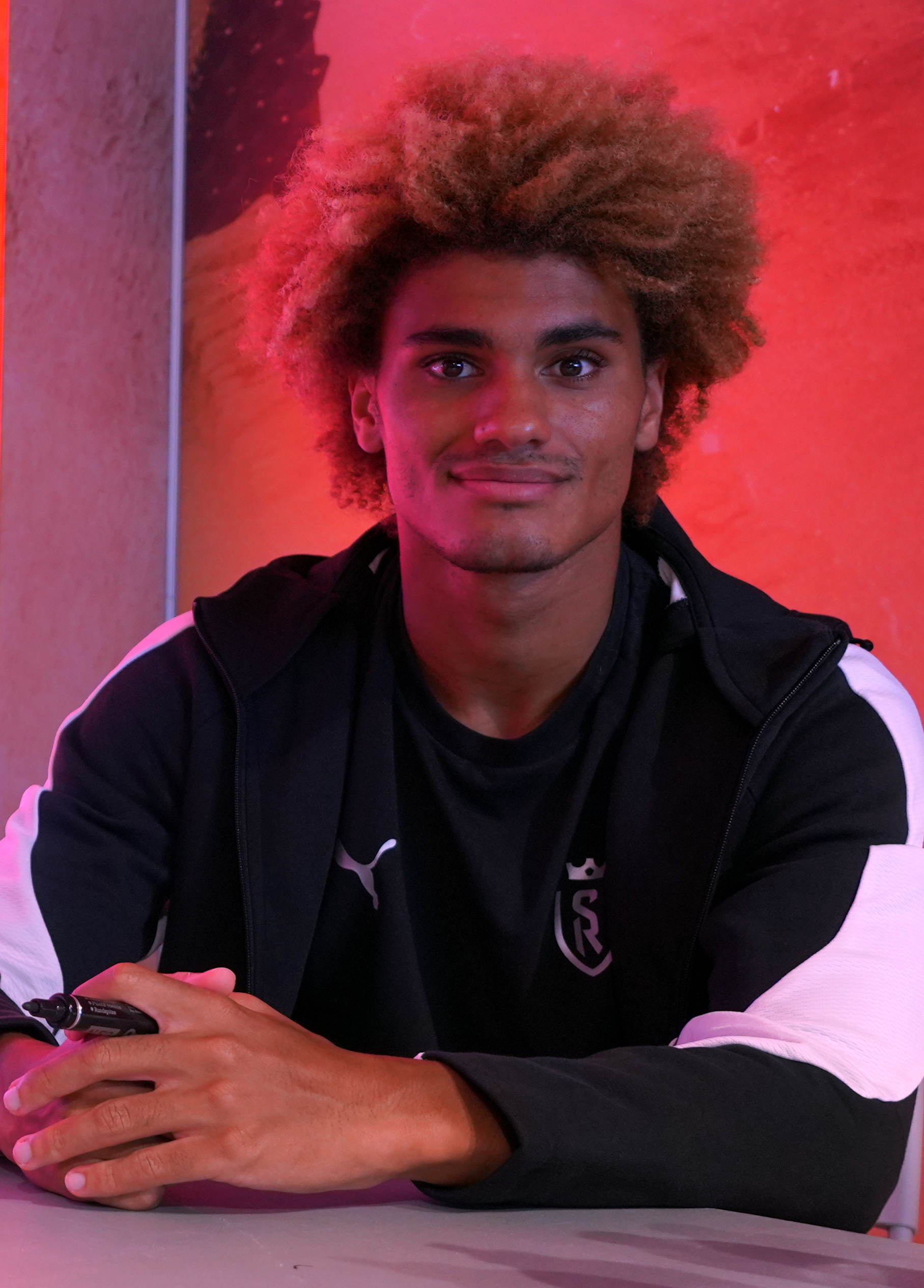
- Patrick with Reims in 2025

Personal information
- Full name: John Joe Patrick Finn Benoa
- Date of birth: 24 September 2003 (age 23)
- Place of birth: Madrid, Spain
- Height: 1.93 m (6 ft 4 in)
- Position: Midfielder

Team information
- Current team: Reims
- Number: 30

Youth career
- 2012–2014: Real Madrid
- 2014–2015: Canillas
- 2015–2018: Alcobendas
- 2018–2021: Getafe

Senior career*
Years	Team	Apps	(Gls)
2020–2025	Getafe	10	(0)
2021–2025	Getafe B	81	(1)
2025–	Reims	28	(0)

International career^{‡}
2021	Republic of Ireland U19	2	(0)
2025–	Republic of Ireland	1	(0)
- * Club domestic league appearances and goals as of 13:37, 5 May 2026 ‡ National team caps and goals as of 10:43, 11 November 2025

John Joe Patrick Finn Benoa (born 24 September 2003), known as John Patrick, is a professional footballer who plays as a midfielder for Ligue 2 club Reims. Born in Spain, he represents the Republic of Ireland national team.

== Club career ==
=== Early career ===
John Patrick joined Real Madrid's La Fábrica in 2012, at the age of nine. He subsequently represented CD Canillas, Alcobendas CF and Getafe CF as a youth, having joined the latter side in 2018.

=== Getafe ===
On 5 December 2020, before even appearing with the reserves, John Patrick made his professional – and La Liga – debut by coming on as a late substitute for Ángel in a 0–3 away loss against Levante UD; aged 17 years and 42 days, he became the youngest debutant in Getafe's history.

=== Reims ===
On 15 January 2025, Patrick signed with Ligue 1 side Reims. He made his debut for the club on 25 January 2025, starting in his side's 1–1 draw away to Paris Saint-Germain at the Parc des Princes. On 24 May 2025, he was part of the side that lost the 2025 Coupe de France final 3–0 to Paris Saint-Germain. 5 days later his side were relegated to Ligue 2 after losing the relegation playoff 4–2 on aggregate to Metz.

== International career ==
John Patrick was born in Madrid to a French mother with Cameroonian grandparents on her side and an Irish father from Galway through whom he has grandparents from Ballyhaunis, County Mayo, where he visited most summers during his childhood. He was eligible to represent Ireland, Spain, France or Cameroon internationally.

In March 2021, it was confirmed by Republic of Ireland U21 manager Jim Crawford, that John has chosen to represent the Republic of Ireland saying, "He certainly wants to play for the Republic of Ireland". On 4 October 2021, he was called up to the Republic of Ireland U19 squad for the first time, for their double header of friendlies against Sweden U19 in Marbella, Spain. He made his underage international debut on 8 October 2021 in a 2–2 draw with Sweden.

On 14 May 2025, he received his first senior call up to the Republic of Ireland national team for their friendly fixtures against Senegal and Luxembourg in June. He made his senior international debut on 10 June 2025, replacing Jason Knight as a late substitute in a 0–0 draw away to Luxembourg.

== Career statistics ==
=== Club ===
As of match played on 2 May 2026

Appearances and goals by club, season and competition
Club	Season	League			National Cup (Note: Includes Copa del Rey & Coupe de France)		Europe		Other		Total	
Club	Season	Division	Apps	Goals	Apps	Goals	Apps	Goals	Apps	Goals	Apps	Goals
Getafe	2020–21	La Liga	6	0	2	0	—		—		8	0
Getafe	2021–22	La Liga	0	0	0	0	—		—		0	0
Getafe	2022–23	La Liga	0	0	0	0	—		—		0	0
Getafe	2023–24	La Liga	0	0	1	1	—		—		1	1
Getafe	2024–25	La Liga	4	0	2	0	—		—		6	0
Getafe	Total		10	0	5	1	—		—		15	1
Getafe B	2021–22	Tercera Federación	27	1	—		—		—		27	1
Getafe B	2022–23	Tercera Federación	16	0	—		—		6 (Note: Appearances in 2023 Tercera Federación play-offs)	0	22	0
Getafe B	2023–24	Segunda Federación	29	0	—		—		2 (Note: Appearances in 2024 Segunda Federación play-offs)	0	31	0
Getafe B	2024–25	Segunda Federación	9	0	—		—		—		9	0
Getafe B	Total		81	1	—		—		8	0	89	1
Reims	2024–25	Ligue 1	13	0	3	0	—		2 (Note: Appearances in the 2025 Ligue 1 Relegation play-offs)	0	18	0
Reims	2025–26	Ligue 2	15	0	5	0	—		—		20	0
Reims	Total		28	0	8	0	—		2	0	38	0
Career total			119	1	13	1	0	0	10	0	142	2

=== International ===
As of match played 10 June 2025

Appearances and goals by national team and year
National team	Year	Apps	Goals
Republic of Ireland
Republic of Ireland	2025	1	0
Total		1	0

== Honours ==
Reims

- Coupe de France runner-up: 2024–25
