= Marc Cucurella =

Spanish footballer (born 1998)

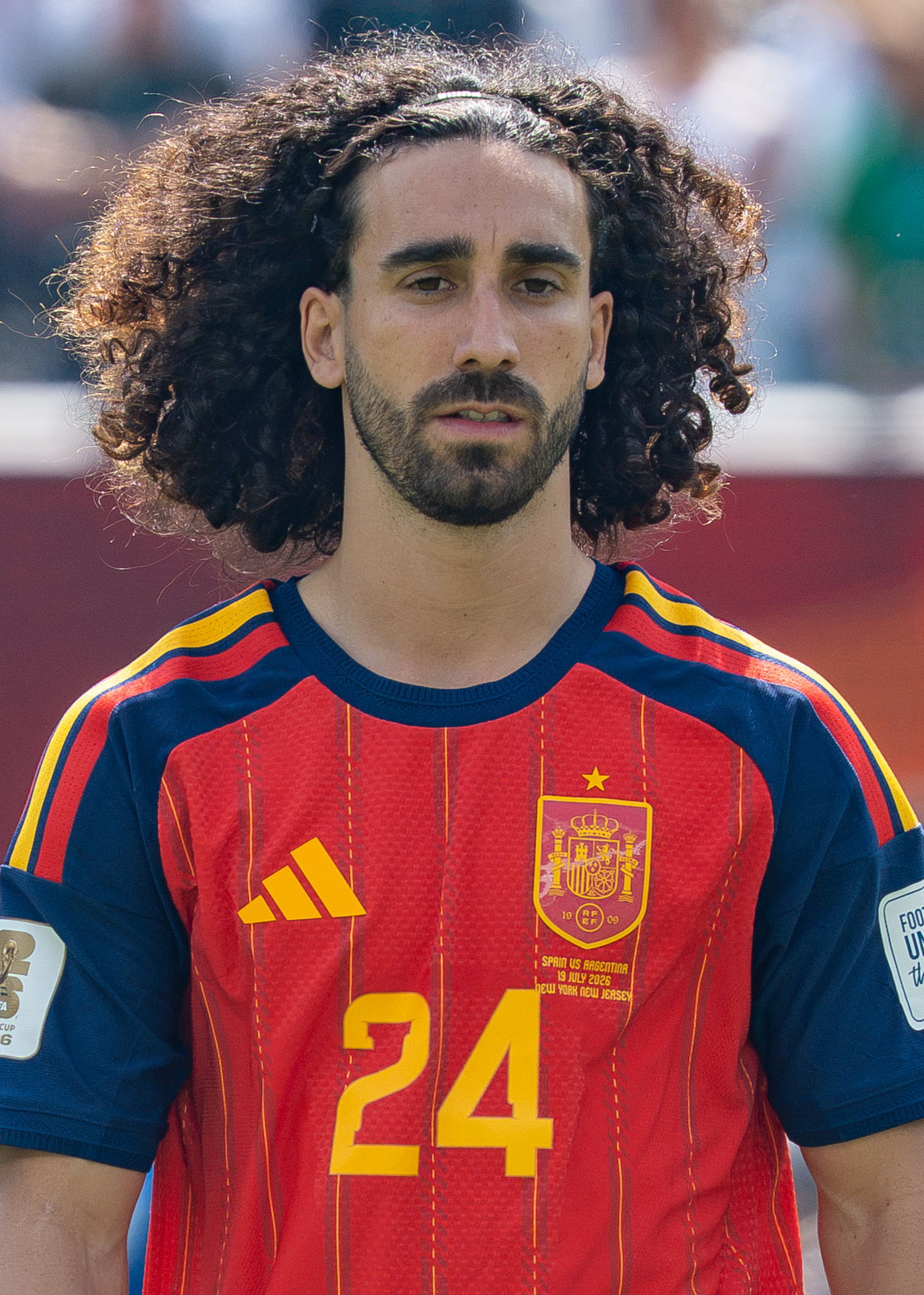
- Cucurella with Spain in 2026

Personal information
- Full name: Marc Cucurella Saseta
- Date of birth: 22 July 1998 (age 28)
- Place of birth: Alella, Spain
- Height: 1.73 m (5 ft 8 in)
- Positions: Left-back; left wing-back

Team information
- Current team: Real Madrid
- Number: 17

Youth career
- 2006–2012: Espanyol
- 2012–2016: Barcelona

Senior career*
Years	Team	Apps	(Gls)
2016–2018	Barcelona B	48	(1)
2017–2020	Barcelona	0	(0)
2018–2019	→ Eibar (loan)	31	(1)
2019–2020	→ Getafe (loan)	37	(1)
2020–2021	Getafe	38	(3)
2021–2022	Brighton & Hove Albion	35	(1)
2022–2026	Chelsea	115	(6)
2026–	Real Madrid	13	(0)

International career^{‡}
2014	Spain U16	3	(0)
2014–2015	Spain U17	16	(2)
2016–2017	Spain U19	6	(0)
2016	Spain U20	6	(0)
2019–2021	Spain U21	11	(1)
2021	Spain U23	6	(0)
2021–	Spain	37	(1)
Medal record
Men's football
Representing Spain
FIFA World Cup
Winner	2026 Canada–Mexico–US
UEFA European Championship
Winner	2024 Germany
UEFA Nations League
Runner-up	2025 Germany
Olympic Games
Silver medal – second place	2020 Tokyo	Team
- * Club domestic league appearances and goals as of 22:08, 21 November 2026 (UTC) ‡ National team caps and goals as of 22:05, 15 November 2026 (UTC)

Marc Cucurella Saseta (Catalan pronunciation: [ˈmaɾ(k) kukuˈɾeʎə səˈzɛtə]; born 22 July 1998) is a Spanish professional footballer who plays as a left-back or left wing-back for La Liga club Real Madrid and the Spain national team. He is considered to be one of the best left-backs in the world.

Cucurella made his senior club debut at Barcelona, but spent most of his time there with the reserve team. He went on to play over 100 La Liga games for Eibar and Getafe, before joining Brighton & Hove Albion in 2021. He spent a season with Brighton before joining Chelsea in 2022, winning the Conference League and the FIFA Club World Cup three years later. He returned to Spain in 2026, signing for Real Madrid.

Cucurella was capped for Spain over every youth level from under-16 to under-23, winning the silver medal with the latter at the 2020 Olympic tournament. He made his debut for the senior team in 2021 and later represented the side at UEFA Euro 2024, where Spain won the tournament, and at the 2026 FIFA World Cup, also won by Spain.

== Club career ==
=== Barcelona ===
Born in Alella, Barcelona, Catalonia, Cucurella started playing futsal with FS Alella before joining Espanyol's youth teams in 2006, and in 2012, he moved to Barcelona. On 26 November 2016, while still a junior, he made his senior debut with the reserves by starting in a 4–0 home win over L'Hospitalet in the Segunda División B.

Cucurella contributed with 17 appearances for the side, achieving promotion to the Segunda División via the play-offs. On 7 July 2017, he renewed his contract until 2021, with a €12 million clause. He made his professional debut on 1 September, starting in a 2–2 away draw against Granada. He made his first-team debut on 24 October, coming on as a late substitute for Lucas Digne in a 3–0 Copa del Rey away win against Real Murcia. He scored his first senior goal for Barcelona B on 17 March 2018, equalising in a draw away to Lorca.

=== Eibar ===
On 31 August 2018, Cucurella was loaned to fellow La Liga club Eibar, for one year with a €2 million buyout clause. He made his top-flight debut on 25 September in a 1–0 loss away to Espanyol. Appearing as one of eight changes by manager José Luis Mendilibar, he was praised by Marca journalist Ander Barroso despite the result. He scored his first La Liga goal on the final day of the season on 9 May 2019, opening the scoring in 2–2 draw at home to his parent club.

=== Getafe ===
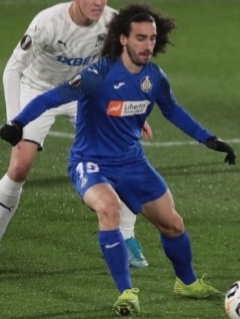
Cucurella playing for Getafe in 2019

At the end of his loan, Eibar exercised Cucurella's clause, making him a permanent player for the Basque team; along with the transfer, Barcelona added a €4 million buyback option. On 16 July 2019, after just sixteen days as a permanent Eibar player, this clause was activated, only for him to be loaned to Getafe two days later for the upcoming season, with an option to buy for €6 million and 40% of the rights remaining to Barcelona.

Cucurella made his European debut on 19 September 2019 as a substitute for Kenedy in a 1–0 home win over Trabzonspor in the UEFA Europa League group stage. He played eight games of that campaign, which ended 11 months later with a 2–0 loss on aggregate to Inter Milan in the last 16.

On 3 March 2020, Getafe triggered his option to buy for €6 million, no longer connecting him to Barcelona. The club fully exercised his option to buy on 30 June.

=== Brighton and Hove Albion ===
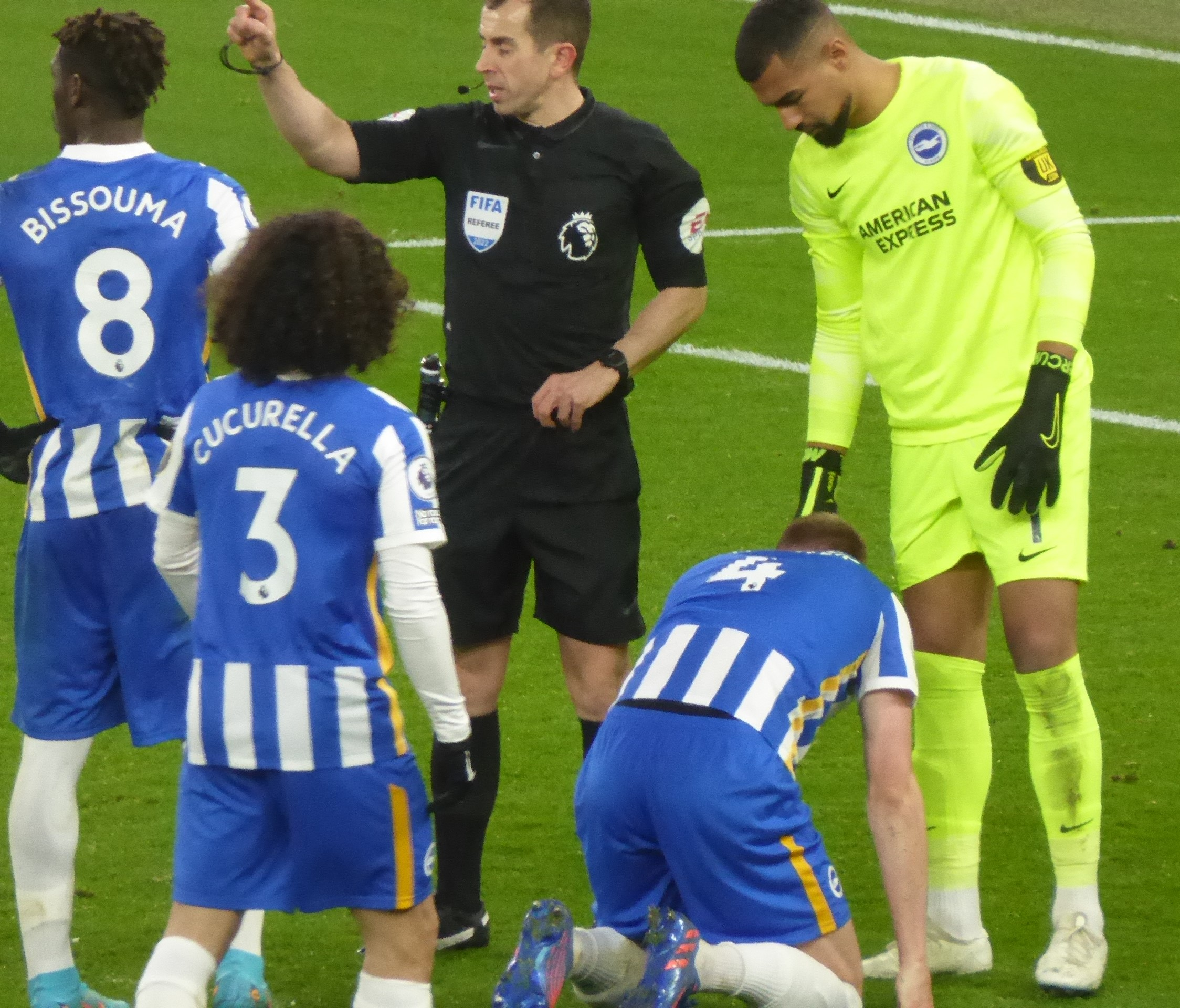
Cucurella with Brighton & Hove Albion in 2022

On 31 August 2021, Cucurella joined Premier League club Brighton & Hove Albion on a five-year contract. He made his debut for Brighton on 11 September, starting and playing 82 minutes before being substituted in the 1–0 away win over Brentford. Eight days later, he made his home debut, playing the whole of the 2–1 victory over Leicester City. His chipped cross set up Danny Welbeck's headed equaliser in added time, finishing 1–1 away to Chelsea on 29 December. On 7 May 2022, he scored his first goal for the club; he netted the second of a 4–0 win over Manchester United by shooting from Leandro Trossard's pull back. Three days later, at the club's end of season awards, Cucurella won Players' Player of the Season as well as being voted Player of the Season.

=== Chelsea ===
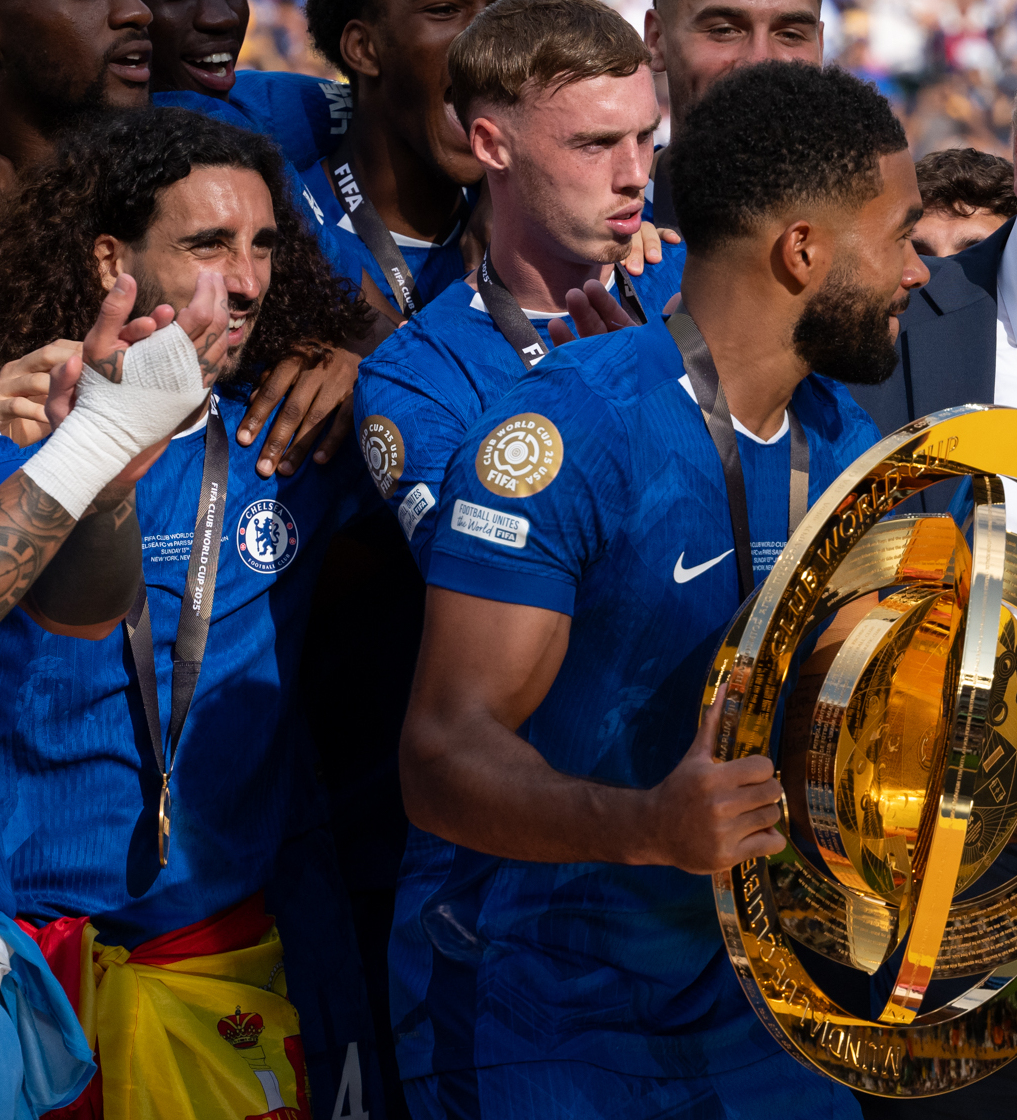
Cucurella (left) with Chelsea, celebrating the win of the 2025 FIFA Club World Cup

On 5 August 2022, Cucurella signed for Premier League club Chelsea on a six-year contract. The fee was reported to be worth an initial £56 million, potentially rising to £63 million in add-ons, which was a record fee received by Brighton. On 6 August, he made his debut as a substitute in a 1–0 away win against Everton in the Premier League. On 7 March 2023, he was named Player of the Match in the Champions League round-of-16-second leg match against Borussia Dortmund, which ended in a 2–0 win and qualification to the quarter-final. On 17 March 2024, he scored his first goal for the club by netting the opener in a 4–2 victory over Leicester City in the FA Cup quarter-finals.

On 15 December 2024, Cucurella scored his first Premier League goal for Chelsea, a headed opener assisted by Noni Madueke in a 2–1 home victory over Brentford. In the same game, Cucurella would receive his first career red card, being shown a second yellow for a scuffle with Brentford's Kevin Schade after the final whistle which Schade also received a yellow card for.

=== Real Madrid ===
On 15 June 2026, Cucurella signed for La Liga club Real Madrid on a six-year contract. The fee was reported to be an initial €55 million, plus €5 million in add-ons. He made his debut on 22 August 2026, in a 2–1 win over Espanyol.

== International career ==
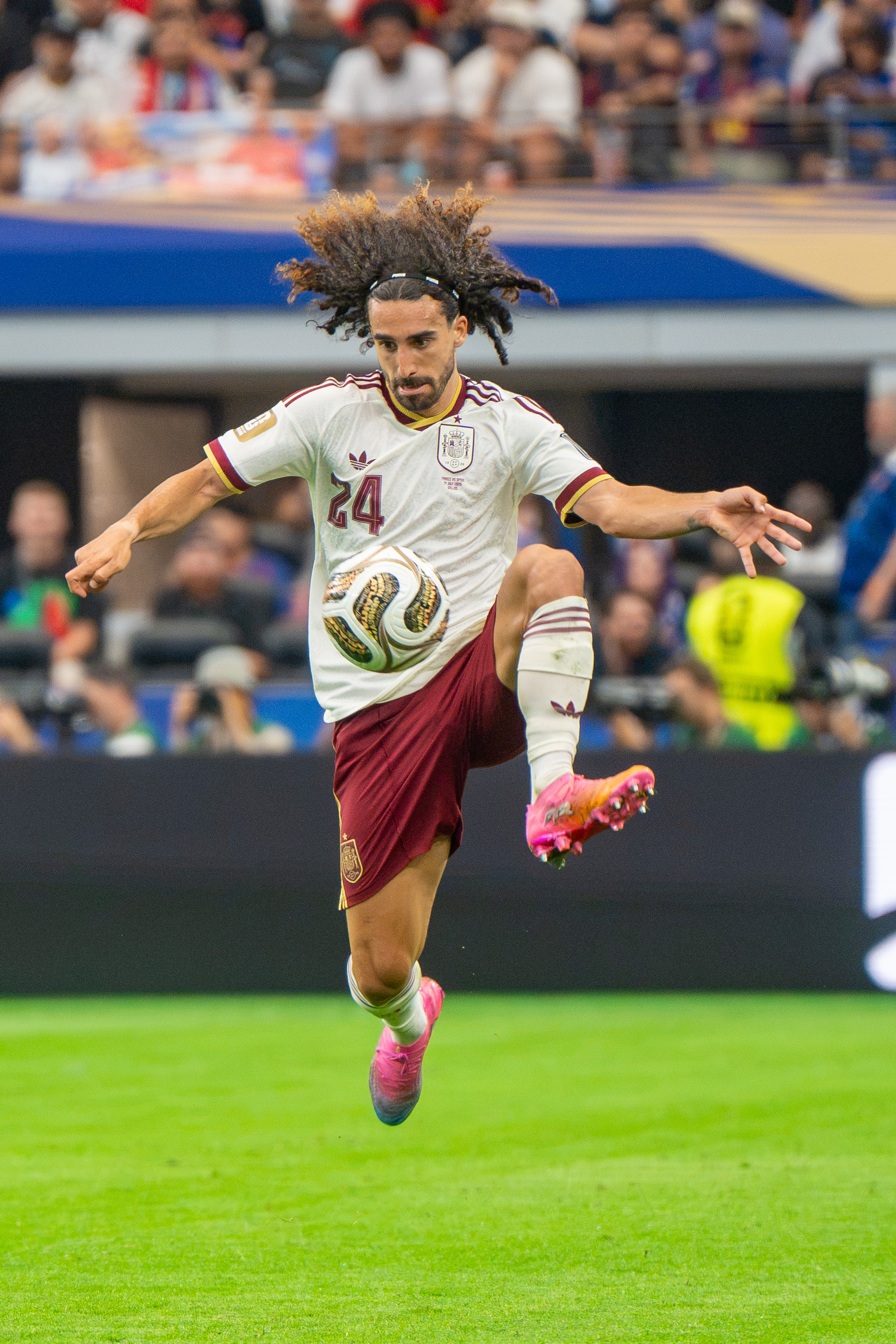
Cucurella with Spain at the 2026 FIFA World Cup

After representing Spain at under-16, under-17 and under-19 level, Cucurella was called up to the Spain under-21 team in September 2019, playing 2021 UEFA European Under-21 Championship qualification matches against Kazakhstan and Montenegro. He captained Spain to the semi-final stage of the 2021 European U21 championship, where they were beaten by Portugal.

Cucurella was also part of the Spain under-23 team that won the silver medal at the 2020 Olympic Games, that took place in 2021 due to the previous year's postponement as a result of the COVID-19 pandemic.

In November 2020, manager Luis Enrique called up Cucurella to the senior Spain squad for UEFA Nations League games against Switzerland and Germany, as José Gayà was injured. He was an unused substitute for the fixtures.

Due to the isolation of some national team players following the positive COVID-19 test of Sergio Busquets, Spain's under-21 squad were called up for the international friendly against Lithuania on 8 June 2021. Cucurella made his debut, acting as captain, in this match that Spain won 4–0.

On 26 March 2024, Cucurella won his second cap for the Spain senior team, playing the full 90 minutes at left back in a 3–3 draw with Brazil at the Estadio Santiago Bernabéu.

In June 2024, Cucurella was named in Spain's squad for UEFA Euro 2024 in Germany. He made his competitive debut in the team's opening match of the tournament, starting at left back as La Furia Roja beat Croatia 3–0 at Berlin's Olympiastadion. In the quarter-finals against Germany, Cucurella was the center of controversy after he had blocked a shot with his hand inside the penalty area, yet no penalty was awarded from the referee as his arm's movement when it hit the ball wasn't considered to be "unnaturally enlarging the body", this subsequently prevented Germany from sending the game into penalties and potentially advancing. Cucurella provided the assist on Mikel Oyarzabal's winning goal as Spain defeated England 2–1 in the final. He was also named in the Team of the Tournament.

On 4 September 2025, during 2026 FIFA World Cup qualification, Cucurella scored his first international goal during Spain's 3–0 victory against Bulgaria. On 25 May 2026, he was named in Spain’s squad for the 2026 FIFA World Cup, where he helped his team win their second title.

== Personal life ==
Cucurella met his partner, Claudia Rodríguez, in 2018. The couple have three children together, the eldest of whom has autism. Marc has spoken publicly about his eldest child's autism, sharing that the child is nonverbal and found common schooling extremely difficult, with Cucurella and Rodríguez saying they had a hard time finding a school that would cater to the child's needs.

== Career statistics ==
=== Club ===
As of match played 21 November 2026

Appearances and goals by club, season and competition
Club	Season	League			National cup (Note: Includes Copa del Rey, FA Cup)		League cup (Note: Includes EFL Cup)		Europe		Other		Total	
Club	Season	Division	Apps	Goals	Apps	Goals	Apps	Goals	Apps	Goals	Apps	Goals	Apps	Goals
Barcelona B	2016–17	Segunda División B	11	0	—		—		—		6 (Note: Appearances in Segunda División B play-offs)	0	17	0
Barcelona B	2017–18	Segunda División	37	1	—		—		—		—		37	1
Barcelona B	Total		48	1	—		—		—		6	0	54	1
Barcelona	2017–18	La Liga	0	0	1	0	—		0	0	0	0	1	0
Eibar (loan)	2018–19	La Liga	31	1	2	1	—		—		—		33	2
Getafe (loan)	2019–20	La Liga	37	1	1	0	—		8 (Note: Appearances in UEFA Europa League)	0	—		45	1
Getafe	2020–21	La Liga	37	3	2	0	—		—		—		39	3
Getafe	2021–22	La Liga	1	0	—		—		—		—		1	0
Getafe	Getafe total		75	4	3	0	—		8	0	—		85	4
Brighton & Hove Albion	2021–22	Premier League	35	1	2	0	1	0	—		—		38	1
Chelsea	2022–23	Premier League	24	0	0	0	1	0	8 (Note: Appearances in UEFA Champions League)	0	—		33	0
Chelsea	2023–24	Premier League	21	0	2	1	3	0	—		—		26	1
Chelsea	2024–25	Premier League	36	5	2	0	1	0	9 (Note: Appearances in UEFA Conference League)	2	6 (Note: Appearances in FIFA Club World Cup)	0	54	7
Chelsea	2025–26	Premier League	34	1	3	0	4	0	9	0	—		50	1
Chelsea	Total		115	6	7	1	9	0	26	2	6	0	163	9
Real Madrid	2026–27	La Liga	13	0	0	0	—		3	0	0	0	16	0
Career total			317	13	15	2	10	0	37	2	11	0	390	17

=== International ===
As of match played 15 November 2026

Appearances and goals by national team and year
National team	Year	Apps	Goals
Spain	2021	1	0
Spain	2022	0	0
Spain	2023	0	0
Spain	2024	12	0
Spain	2025	9	1
Spain	2026	15	0
Total		37	1

As of match played 4 September 2025
Spain score listed first, score column indicates score after each Cucurella goal

List of international goals scored by Marc Cucurella
No.	Date	Venue	Cap	Opponent	Score	Result	Competition
1	4 September 2025	Vasil Levski National Stadium, Sofia, Bulgaria	18	Bulgaria	2–0	3–0	2026 FIFA World Cup qualification

== Honours ==
Barcelona

- Copa del Rey: 2017–18

Chelsea

- UEFA Conference League: 2024–25
- FIFA Club World Cup: 2025
- FA Cup runner-up: 2025–26

Spain U23

- Summer Olympic silver medal: 2020

Spain

- FIFA World Cup: 2026
- UEFA European Championship: 2024
- UEFA Nations League runner-up: 2024–25

Individual

- UEFA European Championship Team of the Tournament: 2024
- Brighton & Hove Albion Players' Player of the Season: 2021–22
- Brighton & Hove Albion Player of the Season: 2021–22
- 2015 UEFA European Under-17 Championship Team of the Tournament
- FIFA Club World Cup Team of the Tournament: 2025
- FIFA World Cup Dream XI: 2026
