= Sofian Chakla =

Moroccan professional footballer

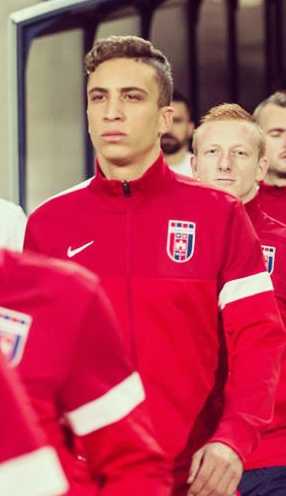
- Chakla with Videoton in 2015

Personal information
- Date of birth: 2 September 1993 (age 33)
- Place of birth: Kenitra, Morocco
- Height: 1.88 m (6 ft 2 in)
- Position: Centre back

Team information
- Current team: Iraklis
- Number: 4

Youth career
- Las Norias
- 2005–2010: La Mojonera
- 2010–2012: Málaga

Senior career*
Years	Team	Apps	(Gls)
2012–2014	Málaga B	19	(2)
2014	Betis B	12	(2)
2014–2015	Videoton	6	(0)
2015–2016	La Roda	23	(0)
2016–2017	El Ejido	23	(1)
2017–2018	Almería B	39	(6)
2018–2019	Melilla	26	(2)
2019–2020	Villarreal B	21	(1)
2020–2021	Villarreal	3	(0)
2021	→ Getafe (loan)	11	(0)
2021–2022	OH Leuven	17	(0)
2023	Ponferradina	13	(0)
2023–2025	Sabah	56	(5)
2025–2026	AEL	13	(1)
2026–	Iraklis	12	(2)

International career^{‡}
2013–2014	Morocco U20	5	(0)
2021–2022	Morocco	4	(0)
- * Club domestic league appearances and goals as of 25 October 2026 ‡ National team caps and goals as of 10 December 2022

Soufiane "Sofian" Chakla (Arabic: سفيان شاكلا; born 2 September 1993) is a Moroccan professional footballer who plays as a centre back for Greek Super League club Iraklis.

== Club career ==
Born in Kenitra, Chakla moved to Spain at the age of eight, and joined Málaga CF's youth setup in 2010. He made his debut as a senior with the reserves in 2012, in Tercera División.

On 27 January 2014, Chakla rescinded with the Andalusians and moved to another reserve team, Real Betis B also in the fourth tier. On 11 July he signed for Hungarian club Videoton FC.

Chakla made his professional debut on 2 November 2014, starting in a 1–0 home win against Budapest Honvéd FC. However, he only appeared in six matches during the whole campaign, and was subsequently released.

On 23 September 2015, after failed trials at Sporting Gijón, Chakla joined Segunda División B club La Roda CF. The following 25 August he moved to fellow league team CD El Ejido 2012.

On 31 May 2017, Chakla signed for UD Almería B in the fourth tier, mainly as a replacement to injured Igor Engonga. On 16 July of the following year, after helping the Andalusians in their promotion, he moved to third division side UD Melilla on a 2+1 contract.

On 17 July 2019, Chakla signed for Villarreal CF; initially assigned to the reserves in division three, he was definitely promoted to the main squad on 27 January 2020. He made his La Liga debut on 19 June, starting in a 1–0 away win against Granada CF.

On 30 January 2021, Chakla joined Getafe CF on loan for the remainder of the 2020–21 season. In August 2021, he moved to Belgian side Oud-Heverlee Leuven.

On 18 January 2023, Chakla returned to Spain after agreeing to a contract with SD Ponferradina in the second level.

== International career ==
He made his debut for Morocco national football team on 30 March 2021 in a 2021 Africa Cup of Nations qualifier against Burundi.

== Career statistics ==
=== Club ===
As of match played 9 May 2021

Appearances and goals by club, season and competition
Club	Season	League			National Cup		League Cup		Other		Total	
Club	Season	Division	Apps	Goals	Apps	Goals	Apps	Goals	Apps	Goals	Apps	Goals
Málaga B	2012–13	Tercera División	15	0	—		—		2 (Note: Appearance(s) in Promotion Playoffs)	0	17	0
Málaga B	2013–14	Tercera División	4	2	—		—		—		4	2
Málaga B	Total		19	2	0	0	0	0	2	0	21	2
Betis B	2013–14	Tercera División	12	2	—		—		6	1	18	3
Videoton	2014–15	NB I	6	0	2	0	9	0	—		17	0
La Roda	2015–16	Segunda División B	23	0	—		—		—		23	0
El Ejido	2016–17	Segunda División B	23	1	—		—		—		23	1
Almería B	2017–18	Tercera División	39	6	—		—		3	0	42	6
Melilla	2018–19	Segunda División B	26	2	3	0	—		4	0	33	2
Villarreal B	2019–20	Segunda División B	21	1	—		—		—		21	1
Villarreal	2019–20	La Liga	2	0	1	0	—		—		3	0
Villarreal	2020–21	La Liga	1	0	2	1	—		—		3	1
Villarreal	Total		3	0	3	1	0	0	0	0	6	1
Getafe (loan)	2020–21	La Liga	11	0	0	0	—		—		11	0
Career total			183	14	8	1	9	0	15	1	215	16

=== International ===
As of match played 18 January 2022

Appearances and goals by national team and year
National team	Year	Apps	Goals
Morocco	2021	3	0
Morocco	2022	1	0
Total		4	0

== Honours ==
Videoton

- Nemzeti Bajnokság: 2014–15

Sabah

- Azerbaijan Cup: 2024–25
