= David Alba =

Spanish footballer

Personal information
- Full name: David Alba Fernández
- Date of birth: 5 May 1999 (age 27)
- Place of birth: Seseña, Spain
- Height: 1.86 m (6 ft 1 in)
- Positions: Centre-back; midfielder

Youth career
- Seseña
- Atlético Madrid
- Getafe

Senior career*
Years	Team	Apps	(Gls)
2018–2021	Getafe	1	(0)
2018–2021	Getafe B	40	(0)
2021–2023	Leganés B	61	(2)
2023–2025	Fuenlabrada	66	(2)
2025–2026	Gimnàstic	22	(0)
- * Club domestic league appearances and goals as of 10 June 2026

David Alba Fernández (born 5 May 1999) is a Spanish footballer who plays as either a central defender or a midfielder.

== Club career ==
Born in Seseña, Toledo, Castile-La Mancha, Alba represented CD Seseña, Atlético Madrid and Getafe CF as a youth. On 6 May 2018, before even appearing with the reserves, he made his professional debut by starting in a 1–0 La Liga away defeat of UD Las Palmas.

On 26 July 2021, after featuring in just one further first team match, Alba moved to another reserve team, CD Leganés B in Segunda División RFEF. On 3 July 2023, he agreed to a two-year deal with Primera Federación side CF Fuenlabrada.

On 3 July 2025, after suffering relegation, Alba joined Gimnàstic de Tarragona on a two-year contract. On 17 July of the following year, he terminated his link with the club.
