= Mamor Niang =

Spanish footballer

Personal information
- Date of birth: 4 February 2002 (age 24)
- Place of birth: Móstoles, Spain
- Height: 1.90 m (6 ft 3 in)
- Position: Forward

Team information
- Current team: Mafra
- Number: 9

Youth career
- Ciudad de Getafe
- Alcorcón
- 2018–2021: Getafe

Senior career*
Years	Team	Apps	(Gls)
2020–2022	Getafe B	18	(1)
2021	Getafe	1	(0)
2022	Avilés	5	(0)
2022–2023	Cornellà	41	(6)
2024	Melilla	7	(0)
2024–2025	Alcoyano	15	(1)
2025	Majd		
2025–	Mafra	30	(12)
- * Club domestic league appearances and goals as of 7 May 2026

Mamor Niang (born 4 February 2002) is a Spanish professional footballer who plays as a forward for Portuguese Liga 3 club Mafra.

== Club career ==
Born in Móstoles, Community of Madrid to a Senegalese family, Niang joined Getafe CF's youth setup in 2018, after representing AD Alcorcón and EF Ciudad de Getafe. He made his senior debut with the former's reserves on 6 December 2020, coming on as a second-half substitute in a 1–2 Segunda División B home loss against UD San Sebastián de los Reyes.

Niang made his first team debut on 5 January 2021, starting in a 0–1 away loss against Córdoba CF, for the season's Copa del Rey. His La Liga debut occurred twenty days later, as he replaced Takefusa Kubo in a 1–5 loss at Athletic Bilbao.

On 23 February 2022, after losing space in the B-side, Niang moved to Segunda División RFEF side Real Avilés CF.
