= 2026–27 Getafe CF season =

Getafe CF
2026–27 season
- Owner: Ángel Torres
- President: Ángel Torres
- Head coach: José Bordalás
- Stadium: Coliseum
- La Liga: 11th
- Copa del Rey: First round
- UEFA Conference League: League phase
Home colours	Away colours	Third colours

The 2026–27 season is the 44th season in the history of Getafe Club de Fútbol, and the club's tenth consecutive season in La Liga. In addition to the domestic league, the club is participating in the Copa del Rey and the UEFA Conference League.

== Players ==
=== First-team squad ===
As of 2 September 2026

Note: Flags indicate national team as defined under FIFA eligibility rules; some limited exceptions apply. Players may hold more than one non-FIFA nationality.

No.	Pos.	Nation	Player
1	GK	CZE	Jiří Letáček
2	DF	TOG	Dakonam Djené (captain)
3	DF	ESP	Davinchi
4	DF	GEO	Saba Sazonov
5	DF	MAR	Abdel Abqar
6	MF	ESP	Mario Martín
7	FW	ESP	Juanmi
8	MF	SRB	Nemanja Gudelj
9	FW	ESP	Borja Mayoral
10	FW	URU	Martín Satriano
11	MF	ESP	Ramon Terrats

No.	Pos.	Nation	Player
13	GK	ESP	David Soria (vice-captain)
14	DF	ESP	Dani Carvajal
15	DF	URU	Sebastián Boselli
16	MF	ESP	Francho Serrano
17	DF	ESP	Kiko Femenía
19	FW	TUR	Enes Ünal
20	FW	ESP	Iván Azón (on loan from Como)
21	DF	ESP	Andrés García (on loan from Aston Villa)
22	DF	COL	Johan Mojica
23	MF	BEL	Orel Mangala (on loan from Lyon)
24	DF	ARG	Zaid Romero
26	DF	CIV	Jean Ives Valou (on loan from Villarreal)

=== Reserve team ===
Note: Flags indicate national team as defined under FIFA eligibility rules; some limited exceptions apply. Players may hold more than one non-FIFA nationality.

No.	Pos.	Nation	Player
27	FW	GAM	Ebrahima Drammeh
28	MF	ESP	Alberto Risco
29	DF	ESP	Curro Burgos
30	MF	BOL	Óscar López

No.	Pos.	Nation	Player
31	DF	MAR	Moha Hamdoune
32	FW	ESP	Joselu Pérez
33	FW	MAR	Moha Achraf
35	GK	ESP	Diego Ferrer

=== Other players under contract ===
Note: Flags indicate national team as defined under FIFA eligibility rules; some limited exceptions apply. Players may hold more than one non-FIFA nationality.

No.	Pos.	Nation	Player
—	MF	NGR	Christantus Uche

=== Out on loan ===
Note: Flags indicate national team as defined under FIFA eligibility rules; some limited exceptions apply. Players may hold more than one non-FIFA nationality.

No.	Pos.	Nation	Player
—	DF	ESP	Gorka Rivera (at Unionistas until 30 June 2027)
—	MF	CMR	Yvan Neyou (at Volos until 30 June 2027)

No.	Pos.	Nation	Player
—	FW	ESP	Álex Sancris (at Leganés until 30 June 2027)
—	FW	MAR	Yassin Tallal (at Real Unión until 30 June 2027)

== Transfers ==
=== In ===
Date	Pos.	Nat.	Player	From	Fee	Ref.
28 May 2026	MF	(Spain)	Mario Martín	(Spain) Real Madrid	Transfer	
6 July 2026	DF	(Argentina)	Zaid Romero	(Belgium) Club Brugge	Transfer	
8 July 2026	MF	(Spain)	Ramon Terrats	(Spain) Villarreal	Transfer	
4 August 2026	DF	(Georgia (country))	Saba Sazonov	(Italy) Torino	Free transfer	
13 August 2026	FW	(Turkey)	Enes Ünal	(England) Bournemouth	Free transfer	
13 August 2026	DF	(Colombia)	Johan Mojica	(Spain) Mallorca	Transfer	
18 August 2026	MF	(Spain)	Francho Serrano	(Spain) Zaragoza	Transfer	
30 August 2026	MF	(Serbia)	Nemanja Gudelj	(Spain) Sevilla	Free transfer	
13 October 2026	DF	(Spain)	Dani Carvajal	(Spain) Real Madrid	Free transfer	

==== Loans in ====
Date	Pos.	Nat.	Player	From	Duration	Ref.
7 July 2026	DF	(Ivory Coast)	Jean Ives Valou	(Spain) Villarreal	End of season	
16 July 2026	DF	(Spain)	Andrés García	(England) Aston Villa	End of season	
7 August 2026	MF	(Belgium)	Orel Mangala	(France) Lyon	End of season	
1 September 2026	DF	(Spain)	Iván Azón	(Italy) Como	End of season	

=== Out ===
Date	Pos.	Nat.	Player	To	Fee	Ref.
11 June 2026	DF	(Spain)	Juan Iglesias	(Spain) Sevilla	Free transfer	
2 July 2026	MF	(Spain)	Luis Milla	(Italy) Como	Transfer	
9 July 2026	MF	(Spain)	Coba da Costa	(Saudi Arabia) Al-Kholood	Transfer	
12 July 2026	MF	(Dominican Republic)	Peter González	(Poland) Górnik Zabrze	Transfer	
6 August 2026	DF	(Portugal)	Domingos Duarte	(Brazil) São Paulo	Free transfer	
1 September 2026	DF	(Spain)	Juan Berrocal	(Spain) Málaga	Free transfer	

==== Loans out ====
Date	Pos.	Nat.	Player	To	Duration	Ref.
25 August 2026	MF	(Spain)	Álex Sancris	(Spain) Leganés	End of season	
2 September 2026	MF	(Cameroon)	Yvan Neyou	(Greece) Volos	End of season	

== Competitions ==
=== La Liga ===
==== League table ====
Pos	Team	Pld	W	D	L	GF	GA	GD	Pts
13	Espanyol	12	3	3	6	13	14	−1	12
14	Rayo Vallecano	11	3	3	5	15	21	−6	12
15	Getafe	12	3	3	6	8	18	−10	12
16	Osasuna	12	3	3	6	12	23	−11	12
17	Levante	12	2	5	5	16	21	−5	11

Updated to match(es) played on 8 November 2026. Source: LaLiga EA Sports
Rules for classification: 1) Points; 2) Head-to-head points; 3) Head-to-head goal difference; 4) Goal difference; 5) Goals scored; 6) Fair-play points (if three or more teams tied); 7) Play-off at neutral site.
(Note: Head-to-head record is used only after all the matches between the teams in question have been played)

==== Matches ====
15 August 2026 1	Alavés	3–0	Getafe	Vitoria-Gasteiz
19:30 CEST (UTC+2)	Suárez (yellow card) 45+3'; Rebbach (yellow card) 66'; Tenaglia 73'; Blanco (yellow card) 85'; Mariano 90+1', (yellow card) 90+2'; Rodríguez 90+4'	Report	Davinchi (yellow card) 10'; Martín (yellow card) 23'; Femenía (yellow card) 42' (red card); Djené (yellow card) 76'	Stadium: Mendizorrotza; Attendance: 13,923; Referee: Manuel Orellana Cid

23 August 2026 2	Getafe	1–0	Racing Santander	Getafe
19:30 CEST (UTC+2)	Sazonov (yellow card) 14'; Ünal 81'	Report	Salinas (yellow card) 12'; Mantilla (yellow card) 16'; Hernando (yellow card) 66'; A. Martín (penalty missed) 77'	Stadium: Coliseum; Attendance: 7,005; Referee: Juan Martínez Munuera

31 August 2026 3	Osasuna	1–0	Getafe	Pamplona
19:30 CEST (UTC+2)	Herrando (yellow card) 17'; Budimir 45+2' (pen.); Muñoz (yellow card) 67'; García (yellow card) 80'; Herrera (yellow card) 90+3'; Barja (yellow card) 90+4'	Report	Djené (yellow card) 45'; Mojica (yellow card) 58'; Ünal (yellow card) 60'; Mangala (yellow card) 65'	Stadium: El Sadar; Attendance: 19,672; Referee: Jon González Esteban

7 September 2026 4	Getafe	1–1	Celta Vigo	Getafe
19:00 CEST (UTC+2)	Satriano 21'; Mojica (yellow card) 45+6'; Romero (yellow card) 55' (yellow-red card) 67'; Terrats (yellow card) 85'	Report	Starfelt 57', (yellow card) 77'; Alonso (yellow card) 85'	Stadium: Coliseum; Attendance: 4,672; Referee: César Soto Grado

13 September 2026 5	Getafe	1–1	Deportivo A Coruña	Getafe
18:30 CEST (UTC+2)	Azón (yellow card) 26'; Ünal (yellow card) 42'; Terrats 66'; Martín (yellow card) 90+6'	Report	Noubi (yellow card) 27'; Aubameyang 78'	Stadium: Coliseum; Attendance: 8,416; Referee: Ricardo de Burgos Bengoetxea

17 September 2026 6	Real Betis	1–0	Getafe	Seville
19:00 CEST (UTC+2)	Ortiz (yellow card) 24'; Ezzalzouli 45'	Report	Davinchi (yellow card) 25'; Martín (yellow card) 53' (yellow-red card) 87'; Gudelj (yellow card) 70'; Boselli (yellow card) 74'	Stadium: La Cartuja; Attendance: 57,792; Referee: José Sánchez Martínez

20 September 2026 7	Getafe	1–0	Málaga	Getafe
14:00 CEST (UTC+2)	Mojica (yellow card) 21'; Gudelj (yellow card) 54'; Serrano (yellow card) 59'; Terrats (yellow card) 68'; Azón 85'	Report	Jauregi (yellow card) 39'; Larrubia (yellow card) 45+5'	Stadium: Coliseum; Attendance: 7,910; Referee: Javier Alberola Rojas

10 October 2026 8	Barcelona	3–0	Getafe	Barcelona
18:30 CEST (UTC+2)	Gordon 2'; Gabriel Jesus 30'; Olmo (yellow card) 46'; Koundé 73'; Fermín (yellow card) 90+1'	Report	Femenía (yellow card) 34'; Mojica (yellow card) 45+2'; Boselli (yellow card) 71'; Terrats (yellow card) 75'	Stadium: Camp Nou; Attendance: 59,463; Referee: Jesús Gil Manzano

19 October 2026 9	Getafe	1–1	Rayo Vallecano	Getafe
21:00 CEST (UTC+2)	Femenía (yellow card) 1'; Djené (yellow card) 16' (yellow-red card) 28'; Serrano (yellow card) 51'; Satriano 56'; Carvajal (yellow card) 79'; Ünal (yellow card) 84'; Gudelj (yellow card) 87'		Á. García 11'; Balliu (yellow card) 45+1'; Ciss (yellow card) 69'; Camello (yellow card) 90+3'	Stadium: Coliseum; Attendance: 7,674; Referee: Jon Ander González Esteban

25 October 2026 10	Athletic Bilbao	4–0	Getafe	Bilbao
14:00 CET (UTC+1)	Berenguer 17'; Williams 35'; Paredes 70'; Gerenabarrena (yellow card) 72'; Berchiche 88'	Report	Terrats (yellow card) 39'; Carvajal (yellow card) 43'; Mojica (yellow card) 63'; Martín (yellow card) 86' (red card)	Stadium: San Mamés; Attendance: 44,160; Referee: Francisco José Hernández Maeso

1 November 2026 11	Getafe	3–1	Sevilla	Getafe
14:00 CET (UTC+1)	Davinchi (yellow card) 59'; Ünal 68'; Satriano 73'; Gudelj (yellow card) 84'; Mangala 90+4'	Report	Salas 19'; Suazo (yellow card) 27'; Agoumé (yellow card) 77'; Sangante (yellow card) 77'; Bueno (yellow card) 90+1' (red card)	Stadium: Coliseum; Attendance: 7,745; Referee: Víctor García Verdura

8 November 2026 12	Villarreal	2–0	Getafe	Villarreal
17:30 CET (UTC+1)	Comesaña (yellow card) 67'; Veiga (yellow card) 76'; Buchanan 80'; Romero 90+1'	Report	Martín (yellow card) 32'; Gudelj (yellow card) 62'	Stadium: Estadio de la Cerámica; Attendance: 17,102; Referee: Carlos Muñiz Muñoz

22 November 2026 13	Getafe	v	Atlético Madrid

29 November 2026 14	Espanyol	v	Getafe

6 December 2026 15	Getafe	v	Valencia

13 December 2026 16	Real Sociedad	v	Getafe

20 December 2026 17	Getafe	v	Levante

3 January 2027 18	Real Madrid	v	Getafe

10 January 2027 19	Elche	v	Getafe

17 January 2027 20	Getafe	v	Athletic Bilbao

24 January 2027 21	Getafe	v	Osasuna

31 January 2027 22	Celta Vigo	v	Getafe

7 February 2027 23	Getafe	v	Villarreal

14 February 2027 24	Racing Santander	v	Getafe

21 February 2027 25	Rayo Vallecano	v	Getafe

28 February 2027 26	Alavés	v	Getafe

7 March 2027 27	Deportivo A Coruña	v	Getafe

14 March 2027 28	Getafe	v	Real Sociedad

21 March 2027 29	Atlético Madrid	v	Getafe

4 April 2027 30	Getafe	v	Espanyol

11 April 2027 31	Valencia	v	Getafe

18 April 2027 32	Getafe	v	Rayo Vallecano

21 April 2027 33	CA Osasuna	v	Getafe

2 May 2027 34	Atlético Madrid	v	Getafe

9 May 2027 35	Getafe	v	Levante

16 May 2027 36	Deportivo de A Coruña	v	Getafe

23 May 2027 37	Getafe	v	Real Madrid

30 May 2027 38	RCD Espanyol	v	Getafe

=== Copa del Rey ===
29 October 2026	Lebrijana	2–3	Getafe	Lebrija
19:00	Gómez 10'; Yuyo 23'	Report	Abqar 45'; Mayoral 45+2'; Mangala 68'	Stadium: Municipal

=== UEFA Conference League ===
==== Qualifying matches ====
20 August 2026	Getafe (Spain)	3–1	(Serbia) Partizan	Coliseum, Getafe
21:00	Ünal 10'; García 87'; Mojica 90'	Report	Seck 43'	Attendance: 4,968; Referee: Andris Treimanis (Latvia)

27 August 2026	Partizan (Serbia)	2–1	(Spain) Getafe	Partizan Stadium, Belgrade
21:00	Jeh 53'; Kojzek 76'	Report	Ünal 70'	Attendance: 28,247; Referee: Urs Schnyder (Switzerland)

==== League phase ====
The league phase draw was held on 28 August 2026.

Pos	Team	Pld	W	D	L	GF	GA	GD	Pts
29	(Georgia (country)) Iberia 1999	3	0	1	2	2	5	−3	1
30	(Cyprus) Pafos	3	0	1	2	3	7	−4	1
31	(Spain) Getafe	3	0	1	2	3	7	−4	1
32	(Scotland) Heart of Midlothian	3	0	1	2	2	6	−4	1
33	(Finland) KuPS	3	0	1	2	2	6	−4	1

Updated to match(es) played on 5 November 2026. Source: UEFA
Rules for classification: League phase tiebreakers

Round	1	2	3	4	5	6
Ground	A	H	H	A	H	H
Result	D					
Position	15					
Points	1					

Source: UEFA
A = Away; H = Home; W = Win; D = Draw; L = Loss

Win Draw Loss Fixtures

15 October 2026	Universitatea Craiova (Romania)	1–1	(Spain) Getafe	Ion Oblemenco Stadium, Craiova
18:45 (19:45 UTC+3)	Romanchuk (yellow card) 26'; Lameira (yellow card) 51'; Cicâldău (yellow card) 56'; Al Hamlawi 59'; Screciu (yellow card) 77'	Report	Mojica (yellow card) 72'; Gudelj 81'	Referee: David Šmajc (Slovenia)

22 October 2026	Getafe (Spain)	2–5	(Switzerland) Lugano	Coliseum, Getafe
18:45	Azón 2'; Mayoral 74'	Report	Ajeti 3', 26'; Cimignani 7'; Bislimi 50'; Behrens 90+2'	Attendance: 6,365; Referee: Atilla Karaoğlan (Turkey)

5 November 2026	Getafe (Spain)	v	(England) Brighton & Hove Albion	Coliseum, Getafe
21:00		Report

26 November 2026	Iberia 1999 (Georgia (country))	v	(Spain) Getafe	Mikheil Meskhi Stadium, Tbilisi
18:45 (21:45 UTC+4)		Report

10 December 2026	Getafe (Spain)	v	(Andorra) Inter Club d'Escaldes	Coliseum, Getafe
18:45		Report

17 December 2026	Ajax (Netherlands)	v	(Spain) Getafe	Johan Cruyff Arena, Amsterdam
21:00		Report
