= 2025–26 Getafe CF season =

Getafe CF
2025–26 season
- Owner: Ángel Torres
- President: Ángel Torres
- Head coach: José Bordalás
- Stadium: Coliseum
- La Liga: 7th
- Copa del Rey: Round of 32
- Top goalscorer: League: Mauro Arambarri; Martín Satriano (6 each); All: Mauro Arambarri; Borja Mayoral; Martín Satriano (6 each)
Home colours	Away colours	Third colours

The 2025–26 season was the 43rd season in the history of Getafe Club de Fútbol, and the club's ninth consecutive season in La Liga. In addition to the domestic league, the club participated in the Copa del Rey.

== Players ==
=== First-team squad ===
As of 3 February 2026

Note: Flags indicate national team as defined under FIFA eligibility rules; some limited exceptions apply. Players may hold more than one non-FIFA nationality.

No.	Pos.	Nation	Player
1	GK	CZE	Jiří Letáček
2	DF	TOG	Djené (captain)
3	DF	MAR	Abdel Abqar
5	MF	ESP	Luis Milla
6	MF	ESP	Mario Martín (on loan from Real Madrid)
7	FW	ESP	Juanmi
8	MF	URU	Mauro Arambarri
9	FW	ESP	Borja Mayoral
10	FW	URU	Martín Satriano (on loan from Lyon)
11	FW	ENG	Abu Kamara (on loan from Hull City)
12	DF	CMR	Allan Nyom
13	GK	ESP	David Soria (vice-captain)

No.	Pos.	Nation	Player
14	MF	ESP	Javi Muñoz
15	DF	URU	Sebastián Boselli (on loan from River Plate)
16	DF	ESP	Diego Rico
17	DF	ESP	Kiko Femenía
18	FW	ESP	Álex Sancris
19	FW	ARG	Luis Vázquez (on loan from Anderlecht)
20	FW	SRB	Veljko Birmančević (on loan from Sparta Prague)
21	DF	ESP	Juan Iglesias
22	DF	POR	Domingos Duarte
23	FW	ESP	Adrián Liso (on loan from Zaragoza)
24	DF	ARG	Zaid Romero (on loan from Club Brugge)
26	DF	ESP	Davinchi

=== Reserve team ===
Note: Flags indicate national team as defined under FIFA eligibility rules; some limited exceptions apply. Players may hold more than one non-FIFA nationality.

No.	Pos.	Nation	Player
29	FW	UKR	Mykyta Aleksandrov
30	MF	ESP	Alberto Risco
31	DF	MAR	Ismael Bekhoucha
32	DF	ESP	Lucas Laso
33	DF	ESP	Marc Vilaplana
34	MF	ESP	Hugo Solozábal
35	GK	ESP	Jorge Benito
37	FW	ESP	Joselu Pérez

No.	Pos.	Nation	Player
39	DF	MAR	Yassin Tallal
41	DF	ESP	Jorge Montes
42	GK	ESP	Diego Ferrer
43	DF	ESP	Tito Cordero
44	MF	ESP	Adrián Riquelme
45	MF	ESP	Alejandro Mestanza (on loan from Atlético Madrid)
46	MF	ESP	Damián Cáceres

=== Out on loan ===
Note: Flags indicate national team as defined under FIFA eligibility rules; some limited exceptions apply. Players may hold more than one non-FIFA nationality.

No.	Pos.	Nation	Player
—	DF	ESP	Juan Berrocal (at Atlanta United until 30 June 2026)
—	MF	NGR	Christantus Uche (at Crystal Palace until 30 June 2026)
—	MF	CMR	Yvan Neyou (at Al-Okhdood until 30 June 2026)

No.	Pos.	Nation	Player
—	FW	ESP	Coba da Costa (at Anderlecht until 30 June 2026)
—	FW	DOM	Peter González (at Valladolid until 30 June 2026)
—	FW	ESP	Sebas Salazar (at Villarreal B until 30 June 2026)

== Transfers ==
=== In ===
Date	Pos.	Nat.	Player	From	Fee	Ref.
11 June 2025	FW	(Spain)	Juanmi	(Spain) Real Betis	Option to buy exercised	
1 July 2025	MF	(Cameroon)	Yvan Neyou	Free agent		
3 July 2025	DF	(Spain)	Davinchi	(Spain) Recreativo	Release clause paid	
4 July 2025	MF	(Spain)	Javier Muñoz	Free agent		
29 July 2025	DF	(Morocco)	Abdel Abqar	(Spain) Alavés	Transfer	

==== Loans in ====
Date	Pos.	Nat.	Player	From	Duration	Ref.
2 July 2025	MF	(Spain)	Adrián Liso	(Spain) Zaragoza	End of season	
29 July 2025	MF	(Spain)	Mario Martín	(Spain) Real Madrid	End of season	
1 September 2025	MF	(England)	Abu Kamara	(England) Hull City	End of season	

=== Out ===
Date	Pos.	Nat.	Player	To	Fee	Ref.
6 July 2025	DF	(Argentina)	Jonathan Silva	(Malaysia) Johor Darul Ta'zim	Free	
24 July 2025	MF	(Spain)	Carles Aleñá	(Spain) Alavés	Transfer	
24 July 2025	MF	(Spain)	Yellu Santiago	(Italy) Hellas Verona	Free transfer	
12 August 2025	DF	(Paraguay)	Omar Alderete	(England) Sunderland	Transfer	
1 September 2025	MF	(Spain)	Álex Sola	(Spain) Granada	Free transfer	

==== Loans out ====
Date	Pos.	Nat.	Player	To	Duration	Ref.
25 July 2025	DF	(Spain)	Juan Berrocal	(United States) Atlanta United	End of season	
1 September 2025	FW	(Nigeria)	Christantus Uche	(England) Crystal Palace	End of season	
1 September 2025	MF	(Dominican Republic)	Peter González	(Spain) Valladolid	End of season	
31 January 2026	MF	(Cameroon)	Yvan Neyou	(Saudi Arabia) Al-Okhdood	End of season	
2 February 2026	MF	(Spain)	Coba da Costa	(Belgium) Anderlecht	End of season	

== Competitions ==
=== La Liga ===
==== League table ====
Pos	Team	Pld	W	D	L	GF	GA	GD	Pts	Qualification or relegation
5	Real Betis	38	15	15	8	59	48	+11	60	Qualification for the Champions League league phase (Note: La Liga gained an additional Champions League place as a result of Spain gaining one of the two European Performance Spots (EPS) awarded to the two associations with the highest UEFA coefficient points in 2025–26.)
6	Celta Vigo	38	14	12	12	53	48	+5	54	Qualification for the Europa League league phase
7	Getafe	38	15	6	17	32	38	−6	51	Qualification for the Conference League play-off round
8	Rayo Vallecano	38	12	14	12	41	44	−3	50	
9	Valencia	38	13	10	15	46	55	−9	49	

Source: LaLiga EA Sports
Rules for classification: 1) Points; 2) Head-to-head points; 3) Head-to-head goal difference; 4) Goal difference; 5) Goals scored; 6) Fair-play points
(Note: Head-to-head record is used only after all the matches between the teams in question have been played)

==== Matches ====
17 August 2025 1	Celta Vigo	0–2	Getafe	Vigo
17:00 CEST (UTC+2)	Swedberg (yellow card) 56'; Rodríguez (yellow card) 87'; Alonso (yellow card) 90'	Report	Uche (yellow card) 45' (goal) 72'; Liso 47'; Soria (yellow card) 81'	Stadium: Abanca-Balaídos; Attendance: 20.530; Referee: Iosu Galech Apezteguía

25 August 2025 2	Sevilla	1–2	Getafe	Seville
21:30 CEST (UTC+2)	Iglesias 45' (o.g.); Carmona (yellow card) 57'; Peque (yellow card) 72'	Report	Liso 15', 51'; Arambarri (yellow card) 66'; Martín (yellow card) 74'	Stadium: Ramón Sánchez-Pizjuán; Attendance: 36,697; Referee: Isidro Díaz de Mera Escuderos

29 August 2025 3	Valencia	3–0	Getafe	Valencia
	Diakhaby 30'; Danjuma 54'; Duro 90+6'	Report		Stadium: Mestalla; Attendance: 45,449; Referee: Francisco Hernández Maeso

13 September 2025 4	Getafe	2–0	Oviedo	Getafe
	Martín 45+4'; Mayoral 45+9'	Report	Viñas (red card) 80'	Stadium: Coliseum; Attendance: 8,657; Referee: José Luis Guzmán Mansilla

21 September 2025 5	Barcelona	3–0	Getafe	Sant Joan Despí
21:00 CEST (UTC+2)	Torres 15', 34'; Raphinha (yellow card) 32'; Christensen (yellow card) 54'; Olmo 62'	Report	Martín (yellow card) 3'; Liso (yellow card) 42'; Djené (yellow card) 44'; Abqar (yellow card) 58'	Stadium: Johan Cruyff Stadium; Attendance: 5,711; Referee: Ricardo de Burgos Bengoetxea

24 September 2025 6	Getafe	1–1	Alavés	Getafe
	Arambarri 63'	Report	Guevara 71'	Stadium: Coliseum; Attendance: 8,005; Referee: Alejandro Quintero González

27 September 2025 7	Getafe	1–1	Levante	Getafe
	Iglesias 57'	Report	Romero 26'	Stadium: Coliseum; Attendance: 7,749; Referee: Mateo Busquets Ferrer

3 October 2025 8	Osasuna	2–1	Getafe	Pamplona
	Bretones 45+4'; Catena 90'	Report	Mayoral 23'	Stadium: El Sadar; Attendance: 19,895; Referee: Javier Alberola Rojas

19 October 2025 9	Getafe	0–1	Real Madrid	Getafe
21:00 UTC+2	Nyom (red card) 77'; Sancris (yellow card) 74' (yellow-red card) 84'	Report	Mbappé 80'	Stadium: Coliseum; Attendance: 10,090; Referee: José Luis Munuera Montero

25 October 2025 10	Athletic Bilbao	0–1	Getafe	Bilbao
	Guruzeta (yellow card) 32'; Lekue (red card) 90+3'	Report	Mayoral 75'; Duarte (yellow card) 88'; Rico (yellow card) 90+5'; Martín (yellow card) 90+5'	Stadium: San Mamés; Attendance: 47,749; Referee: Isidro Díaz de Mera Escuderos

31 October 2025 11	Getafe	2–1	Girona	Getafe
	Martín 72'; Mayoral 86'	Report	Stuani 90+4' (pen.)	Stadium: Coliseum; Attendance: 7,223; Referee: José Sánchez Martínez

9 November 2025 12	Mallorca	1–0	Getafe	Palma
	Muriqi 14'	Report		Stadium: Estadi Mallorca Son Moix; Attendance: 17,507; Referee: Ricardo de Burgos Bengoetxea

23 November 2025 13	Getafe	0–1	Atlético Madrid	Getafe
18:30 CET (UTC+1)	Abqar (yellow card) 40'; Martín (yellow card) 79'	Report	Alvarez (yellow card) 49'; Giménez (yellow card) 57'; Duarte 82' (o.g.); Musso (yellow card) 90+1'	Stadium: Coliseum; Attendance: 9,783; Referee: Guillermo Cuadra Fernández

28 November 2025 14	Getafe	1–0	Elche	Getafe
21:00 CET	Milla (yellow card) 43'; Arambarri 56'; Djené (yellow card) 78'	Report	Mendoza (yellow card) 73'; Aguado (yellow card) 86'	Stadium: Coliseum; Attendance: 7,697; Referee: Alejandro Hernández Hernández

6 December 2025 15	Villarreal	2–0	Getafe	Villarreal
14:00 (UTC+01:00)	Buchanan 45+5'; Maciá (yellow card) 62'; Mikautadze 64'; Pépé (yellow card) 71'	Report	Nyom (yellow card) 22'; Martín (yellow card) 45+3'; Milla (red card); Arambarri (yellow card) 57'; Rico (yellow card) 90+1'	Stadium: Estadio de la Cerámica

13 December 2025 16	Getafe	0–1	Espanyol	Getafe
18:30 UTC+2	Femenía (yellow card) 21'; Duarte (yellow card) 33'; Djené (yellow card) 43'; Sancris (yellow card) 51'; Kamara (yellow card) 85'	Report	El Hilali (yellow card) 28'; Cabrera 53'	Stadium: Coliseum; Attendance: 7,443; Referee: Jesús Gil Manzano

21 December 2025 17	Real Betis	4–0	Getafe	Seville
	Ruibal 16', 49'; Fornals 52'; Hernández 60'	Report		Stadium: La Cartuja; Attendance: 54,365; Referee: Miguel Sesma Espinosa

2 January 2026 18	Rayo Vallecano	1–1	Getafe	Madrid
	De Frutos 45+1'	Report	Arambarri 90+1'	Stadium: Vallecas; Attendance: 12,544; Referee: Miguel Ortiz Arias

9 January 2026 19	Getafe	1–2	Real Sociedad	Getafe
21:00 CET (UTC+1)	Nyom (yellow card) 22'; Juanmi 90'; Bekoucha (yellow card) 90+2'	Report	Méndez 36'; Aramburu (yellow card) 63', (goal) 90+6'	Stadium: Coliseum; Attendance: 7,497; Referee: Francisco José Hernández Maeso

18 January 2026 20	Getafe	0–1	Valencia	Getafe
		Report	Gayà 84'; Rivero (red card) 90+7'	Stadium: Coliseum; Attendance: 8,361; Referee: Isidro Díaz de Mera

26 January 2026 21	Girona	1–1	Getafe	Girona
	Reis 90+4'	Report	Vázquez 59'	Stadium: Montilivi; Attendance: 11,388; Referee: Alejandro Quintero González

1 February 2026 22	Getafe CF	0–0	Celta Vigo	Getafe
18:30	Satriano (yellow card) 35'	Report	Moriba (yellow card) 19'; Iglesias (yellow card) 61'	Stadium: Coliseum; Attendance: 7,363; Referee: Iosu Galech Apezteguía

8 February 2026 23	Alavés	0–2	Getafe	Vitoria-Gasteiz
		Report		Stadium: Mendizorrotza; Attendance: 15,960; Referee: Juan Martínez Munuera

14 February 2026 24	Getafe	2–1	Villarreal	Getafe
15:15 (UTC+01:00)	Satriano 53'; Arambarri 41'	Report	Mikautadze 76'	Stadium: Coliseum; Attendance: 7,551; Referee: Miguel Sesma Espinosa

22 February 2026 25	Getafe	0–1	Sevilla	Getafe
14:00 CET (UTC+1)	Djené (red card) 26'; Iglesias (yellow card) 26'	Report	Nianzou (yellow card) 53'; Sow 64'	Stadium: Coliseum; Attendance: 8,814; Referee: Mateo Busquets Ferrer

2 March 2026 26	Real Madrid	0–1	Getafe	Madrid
21:00 UTC+1	Mastantuono (red card) 90+5'	Report	Satriano 39'; Liso (yellow card) 79' (yellow-red card) 90+7'	Stadium: Bernabéu; Attendance: 65,104; Referee: Alejandro Muñiz Ruiz

8 March 2026 27	Getafe	2–0	Real Betis	Getafe
	Femenía 28'; Satriano 45+1'	Report		Stadium: Coliseum; Attendance: 8,757; Referee: Francisco Hernández Maeso

14 March 2026 28	Atlético Madrid	1–0	Getafe	Madrid
16:15 CET (UTC+1)	Molina 8', (yellow card) 90+8'; Sørloth (yellow card) 55'; Vargas (yellow card) 68'	Report	Abqar (red card) 55'; Romero (yellow card) 60'; Liso (yellow card) 77'; Satriano (yellow card) 90+10'	Stadium: Riyadh Air Metropolitano; Attendance: 58,893; Referee: Miguel Ángel Ortiz Arias

22 March 2026 29	Espanyol	1–2	Getafe	Cornellà de Llobregat
	Fernández 68'	Report	Duarte 48'; Arambarri 52'	Stadium: RCDE Stadium; Attendance: 27,577; Referee: Isidro Díaz de Mera Escuderos

5 April 2026 30	Getafe	2–0	Athletic Bilbao	Getafe
	Vázquez 14'; Satriano 90'	Report		Stadium: Coliseum; Attendance: 7,749; Referee: Juan Martínez Munuera

13 April 2026 31	Levante	1–0	Getafe	Valencia
	Espí 83'	Report	Romero (yellow card) 78' (red card) 90+1'	Stadium: Ciutat de València; Attendance: 18,155; Referee: Alejandro Quintero González

22 April 2026 32	Real Sociedad	0–1	Getafe	San Sebastián
20:00 CEST (UTC+2)	Méndez (penalty missed) 14'; Óskarsson (yellow card) 31'; Marín (yellow card) 45'	Report	Abqar (yellow card) 27'; Gorrotxategi , 29' (o.g.); Iglesias (yellow card) 37'; Arambarri (yellow card) 90+2'; Nyom (yellow card) 90+3'	Stadium: Anoeta; Attendance: 31,464; Referee: Mateo Busquets Ferrer

25 April 2026 33	Getafe	0–2	Barcelona	Getafe
16:15 CEST (UTC+2)	Djené (yellow card) 63'; Martín (yellow card) 87'	Report	Koundé (yellow card) 20'; Gavi (yellow card) 39'; López 45'; Rashford 74'	Stadium: Coliseum; Attendance: 9,487; Referee: Francisco José Hernández Maeso

3 May 2026 34	Getafe	0–2	Rayo Vallecano	Getafe
		Report	Camello 38'; Nteka 73'	Stadium: Coliseum; Attendance: 7,693; Referee: Miguel Sesma Espinosa

10 May 2026 35	Oviedo	0–0	Getafe	Oviedo
	López (red card) 54'; Sibo (red card) 78'	Report		Stadium: Carlos Tartiere; Attendance: 19,135; Referee: César Soto Grado

13 May 2026 36	Getafe	3–1	Mallorca	Getafe
	Satriano 14', 41'; Romero 63'	Report	Mascarell 65'	Stadium: Coliseum; Attendance: 7,238; Referee: Juan Martínez Munuera

17 May 2026 37	Elche	1–0	Getafe	Elche
19:00 CEST	Chust 19'; Silva (yellow card) 66'; Rodríguez (yellow card) 69'; Neto (yellow card) 78'	Report	Djené (red card) 39'; Satriano (yellow card) 90+6'	Stadium: Martínez Valero; Attendance: 28,371; Referee: Víctor García Verdura

23 May 2026 38	Getafe	1–0	Osasuna	Getafe
	Milla 59'	Report		Stadium: Coliseum; Attendance: 8,566; Referee: Alejandro Quintero González

=== Copa del Rey ===
28 October 2025 First round	Inter de Valdemoro	0–11	Getafe	Getafe (Note: Inter de Valdemoro did not play the match in their main stadium El Restón, Valdemoro, as it did not meet the broadcasting requirements.)
20:00		Report	Martín 21'; Juanmi 26' (pen.), 36', 45', 48'; Muñoz 52', 66'; Neyou 56'; Joselu 70'; Mayoral 72', 76'	Stadium: Coliseum; Referee: Iosu Galech Apezteguía

2 December 2025 Second round	Navalcarnero	2–3 (a.e.t.)	Getafe	Navalcarnero
21:00	Perera 6'; Pérez 14'	Report	Calado 69' (o.g.); Martín 88'; Montes 111'	Stadium: Mariano González

18 December 2025 Round of 32	Burgos	3–1	Getafe	Burgos
19:00	González 45+4' (pen.); Córdoba 57', 73'	Report	Sancris 32'	Stadium: El Plantío; Attendance: 7,987; Referee: Ricardo de Burgos Bengoetxea
