= Alejandro Mestanza =

Spanish footballer (born 2004)

Personal information
- Full name: Alejandro García Mestanza
- Date of birth: 7 December 2004 (age 21)
- Place of birth: Madrid, Spain
- Height: 1.77 m (5 ft 10 in)
- Position: Attacking midfielder

Team information
- Current team: Académico de Viseu
- Number: 45

Youth career
- Rayo Majadahonda

Senior career*
Years	Team	Apps	(Gls)
2023	Rayo Majadahonda	11	(1)
2023–2026	Atlético Madrid B	29	(3)
2025	→ Intercity (loan)	17	(0)
2025–2026	→ Getafe B (loan)	31	(12)
2026	→ Getafe (loan)	3	(0)
2026–	Académico de Viseu	0	(0)
- * Club domestic league appearances and goals as of 7 May 2026

Alejandro García Mestanza (born 7 December 2004) is a Spanish professional footballer who plays as an attacking midfielder for Primeira Liga club Académico de Viseu. Jonatan Chepon

== Career ==
Born in Madrid, Mestanza was a Rayo Majadahonda youth graduate, and made his first team debut on 11 March 2023, in a 1–1 Primera Federación home draw against Cultural Leonesa. He subsequently started to feature more regularly in the main squad, and scored his first goal on 13 May, in a 2–2 home draw against SS Reyes.

On 20 July 2023, Mestanza signed a four-year contract with Atlético Madrid, being initially assigned to the reserves also in the third division. On 15 January 2025, after failing to establish himself as a regular starter for the B-side, he moved to Intercity of the same category on loan.

On 27 August 2025, Mestanza moved to another reserve team, Getafe B, also in a temporary deal. He made his main squad – and La Liga – debut the following 2 January, coming on as a late substitute for Javi Muñoz in a 1–1 away draw against Rayo Vallecano.

On 22 July 2026, Mestanza moved abroad and signed a three-year contract with Portuguese Primeira Liga club Académico de Viseu.
