= Jiří Letáček =

Czech footballer (born 1999)

Personal information
- Date of birth: 9 January 1999 (age 27)
- Place of birth: Pardubice, Czech Republic
- Height: 1.96 m (6 ft 5 in)
- Position: Goalkeeper

Team information
- Current team: Getafe CF
- Number: 1

Youth career
- Pardubice

Senior career*
Years	Team	Apps	(Gls)
2018–2023	Pardubice	55	(0)
2022–2023	→ Baník Ostrava (loan)	9	(0)
2023–2024	Baník Ostrava	32	(0)
2024–	Getafe	0	(0)

International career
2014–2015	Czech Republic U16	6	(0)
2015–2016	Czech Republic U17	5	(0)
2016–2017	Czech Republic U18	3	(0)
- * Club domestic league appearances and goals as of 12 July 2024

Jiří Letáček (born 9 January 1999) is a Czech professional footballer who plays as a goalkeeper for Getafe CF.

== Club career ==
Letáček played for all the youth teams of FK Pardubice. In 2018, he moved to the senior team. After Pardubice was promoted from the Czech National Football League, he made his Czech First League debut on 13 March 2021, at the age of 22, in their 1–0 away loss against Opava. Before the 2022–23 season, he transferred to Baník Ostrava, where he first spent a year on loan. In the 2023–24 season, he was the third best goalkeeper of the Czech First League with 9 clean sheets.

On 13 July 2024, Letáček signed a four-year contract with Getafe.

== International career ==
Letáček played for the U16–U18 Czech Republic youth national teams. In 2019, he was nominated for a Czech Republic U21 training camp with two friendly matches, but remained only among the substitutes.

== Career statistics ==
As of match played 18 December 2025

Appearances and goals by club, season and competition
Club	Season	League			National Cup		Continental		Other		Total	
Club	Season	Division	Apps	Goals	Apps	Goals	Apps	Goals	Apps	Goals	Apps	Goals
Pardubice	2018–19	Czech National Football League	21	0	1	0	—		—		22	0
Pardubice	2019–20	Czech National Football League	11	0	0	0	—		—		11	0
Pardubice	2020–21	Czech First League	12	0	0	0	—		—		12	0
Pardubice	2021–22	Czech First League	11	0	1	0	—		—		12	0
Pardubice	Total		55	0	2	0	—		—		57	0
Baník Ostrava (loan)	2022–23	Czech First League	9	0	1	0	—		—		10	0
Baník Ostrava	2023–24	Czech First League	32	0	0	0	—		—		32	0
Baník Ostrava	Ostrava total		41	0	1	0	—		—		42	0
Getafe	2024–25	La Liga	0	0	5	0	—		—		5	0
Getafe	2025–26	La Liga	0	0	3	0	—		—		3	0
Getafe	2026–27	La Liga	0	0	0	0	0	0	—		0	0
Getafe	Total		0	0	8	0	0	0	—		8	0
Career total			133	0	11	0	0	0	0	0	144	2
