= Mesut Ünal =

Turkish footballer

Personal information
- Date of birth: April 3, 1973 (age 53)
- Place of birth: Istanbul, Turkey
- Height: 1.85 m (6 ft 1 in)
- Position: Centre-back

Youth career
- 1990–1993: Bursaspor

Senior career*
Years	Team	Apps	(Gls)
1993–2000	Bursaspor	85	(2)
1998–1999	→ Sakaryaspor (loan)	10	(1)
2000–2001	Altay	4	(0)
2001–2005	Sakaryaspor	116	(10)
2005–2006	Bursaspor	13	(0)
2006–2007	Oyak Renault G.S.D.	17	(0)
2007–2008	Balıkesirspor	5	(0)
Total		250	(13)

International career
1995	Turkey U21	1	(0)
- * Club domestic league appearances and goals

Mesut Ünal (born 3 April 1973) is a Turkish former footballer who played as a centre-back, best known for his Süper Lig stints with Bursaspor and Sakaryaspor.

== Club career ==
A youth product of Bursaspor, Ünal made his professional debut with Bursaspor in a 1–0 Süper Lig loss to Zeytinburnuspor on 14 November 1993. He had several spells with Bursaspor throughout his career, and also spent time with Sakaryaspor.

== International career ==
Ünal made one appearance with the Turkey U21s in a 1996 UEFA European Under-21 Championship 2-0 qualification win over Switzerland U21 on 24 April 1995.

== Personal life ==
Mesut's son, Enes Ünal, is also a professional footballer and international for Turkey.
