= 2007 Copa del Rey final =

- Event: 2006–07 Copa del Rey
Sevilla	Getafe
1	0
- Date: 23 June 2007
- Venue: Santiago Bernabéu, Madrid
- Referee: Julián Rodríguez Santiago
- Attendance: 80,000
- Weather: Clear; 25 °C (77 °F)

The 2007 Copa del Rey final was the 105th final since its establishment. The match took place on 23 June 2007 at the Santiago Bernabéu Stadium, Madrid. The match was contested by Sevilla and Getafe, and was refereed by Julián Rodríguez Santiago. With a 1–0 victory, Sevilla – who also triumphed in the 2006–07 UEFA Cup a month earlier – won the trophy for the fourth time in their history; it was their sixth final, while Getafe had reached that stage for the first time ever (they also made it to the final a year later but lost again, to Valencia).

== Road to the final ==
Sevilla			Round	Getafe
Opponent	Result	Legs		Opponent	Result	Legs
Gimnástica Segoviana	4–0	1–0 away; 3–0 home	Round of 32	Xerez	3–2	2–0 away; 1–2 home
Rayo Vallecano	3–1	0–0 home; 3–1 away	Round of 16	Valencia	5–3	1–1 home; 4–2 away
Real Betis	1–1	0–0 home; 1–0 away *	Quarter-finals	Osasuna	3–1	3–0 home; 0–1 away
Deportivo La Coruña	5–0	2–0 away; 3–0 home	Semi-finals	Barcelona	6–5	2–5 away; 4–0 home

* Match abandoned after 57 minutes at 0–1 due to injury of Sevilla coach Juande Ramos; remainder of the game played on March 18 at the Coliseum Alfonso Pérez, Getafe.

== Match details ==
23 June 2007
22:00 CEST

Sevilla	1–0	Getafe
Kanouté 11'	(Report)

Santiago Bernabéu, Madrid
Attendance: 80,000
Referee: Julián Rodríguez Santiago (Castile and León)

Sevilla	Getafe

GK	1	(Spain) Andrés Palop
RB	4	(Brazil) Dani Alves
CB	2	(Spain) Javi Navarro (c)
CB	14	(France) Julien Escudé
LB	19	(Serbia) Ivica Dragutinović
RM	15	(Spain) Jesús Navas
CM	8	(Denmark) Christian Poulsen
AM	11	(Brazil) Renato	(yellow card) 27'	(substituted off) 79'
LM	16	(Spain) Antonio Puerta		(substituted off) 75'
CF	10	(Brazil) Luís Fabiano		(substituted off) 48'
CF	12	(Mali) Frédéric Kanouté	(red card) 88'
Substitutes:
GK	13	(Spain) David Cobeño
DF	20	(Spain) Aitor Ocio
MF	5	(Portugal) Duda	(yellow card) 90'	(substituted on) 75'
MF	18	(Spain) José Luis Martí		(substituted on) 79'
MF	25	(Italy) Enzo Maresca
FW	7	(Uruguay) Javier Chevantón
FW	9	(Russia) Aleksandr Kerzhakov		(substituted on) 48'
Manager:
(Spain) Juande Ramos

GK	1	(Spain) Luis García
RB	2	(Romania) Cosmin Contra		(substituted off) 84'
CB	4	(Spain) David Belenguer (c)	(yellow card) 50'
CB	5	(Spain) Rubén Pulido	(yellow card) 90'
LB	3	(Spain) Javier Paredes	(yellow card) 39'
RM	7	(Spain) Mario Cotelo
CM	6	(Switzerland) Fabio Celestini	(yellow card) 86'
AM	22	(Spain) Javier Casquero
LM	15	(Spain) Nacho	(yellow card) 64'	(substituted off) 70'
CF	19	(Spain) Dani Güiza	(yellow card) 45'
CF	14	(Spain) Manu		(substituted off) 76'
Substitutes:
GK	32	(Spain) Manuel Arroyo
DF	21	(Spain) David Cortés
DF	20	(Spain) Alexis
MF	24	(Spain) Alberto
MF	8	(Spain) Vivar Dorado		(substituted on) 70'
FW	17	(Spain) Sergio Pachón		(substituted on) 84'
FW	9	(Latvia) Māris Verpakovskis		(substituted on) 76'
Manager:
(Germany) Bernd Schuster

Match rules

- 90 minutes
- 30 minutes of extra time if necessary
- Penalty shoot-out if scores still level
- Seven named substitutes
- Maximum of three substitutions
