= Óscar López (footballer, born 2006) =

Bolivian footballer (born 2006)

Personal information
- Full name: Óscar David López Raslan
- Date of birth: 13 August 2006 (age 20)
- Place of birth: Alaró, Spain
- Position: Midfielder

Team information
- Current team: Getafe B

Youth career
- 2020–2022: Sporting Ciutat de Palma
- 2022–2024: La Salle
- 2024: San Francisco
- 2024–2025: Mallorca

Senior career*
Years	Team	Apps	(Gls)
2025–2026	Mallorca B	24	(1)
2026–	Getafe	2	(0)
2026–	Getafe B	1	(0)

International career^{‡}
2024–	Bolivia	5	(0)
- * Club domestic league appearances and goals as of 18:13, 20 September 2026 (UTC) ‡ National team caps and goals as of 22:00, 30 September 2026 (UTC)

Óscar David López Raslan (born 13 August 2006) is a footballer who plays as a midfielder for Spanish club Getafe CF B. Born in Spain, he represents Bolivia at international level.

== Early life ==
López was born in Alaró on the island of Mallorca. He has dual nationality with Bolivia through his mother, who is from Beni Department, and he lived in the South American country between the ages of 11 and 14.

== Club career ==
López played as a youth for Sporting Ciutat de Palma before moving to SD La Salle, where he played in the Juvenil Preferente and Juvenil Nacional in respective years. Halfway through his second season he was signed by RCD Mallorca, being assigned to affiliate side CD San Francisco. In 2024, back to Mallorca, he signed his first professional contract, and made his senior debut with the reserves shortly after.

On 5 August 2026, López moved to another reserve team, Getafe CF B in Segunda Federación, on a three-year deal. He made his La Liga debut for the first team on 7 September, as an added-time substitute in a 1–1 home draw with RC Celta de Vigo. He was the fourth Bolivian citizen to play in Spain's top league, and the first since Juan Manuel Peña left RC Celta de Vigo in 2009.

== International career ==
López was first called up to the Bolivian international youth teams in 2023 after being called up by scouts. He said that it took time to adapt to the extreme altitude of the country.

In November 2024, after being called up to the under-20 team, López was promoted to train with the senior national team. He made his debut on 14 November 2024 in a 4–0 loss away to Ecuador in 2026 FIFA World Cup qualification, as a half-time substitute. He became the youngest RCD Mallorca player to win a senior cap, breaking the record held since 2015 by 19-year-old James Davis for Equatorial Guinea.

== Career statistics ==
=== Club ===
As of match played 20 September 2026

Appearances and goals by club, season and competition
Club	Season	League			Cup		Other		Total	
Club	Season	Division	Apps	Goals	Apps	Goals	Apps	Goals	Apps	Goals
Mallorca B	2025–26	Tercera Federación	24	1	—		—		24	1
Getafe	2026–27	La Liga	2	0	0	0	—		2	0
Getafe B	2026–27	Segunda Federación	1	0	—		—		1	0
Career total			27	1	0	0	0	0	27	1

=== International ===
As of matches played 30 September 2026

Appearances and goals by national team and year
National team	Year	Apps	Goals
Bolivia	2024	1	0
Bolivia	2025	1	0
Bolivia	2026	3	0
Total		5	0
