= Enes Ünal =

Turkish footballer (born 1997)

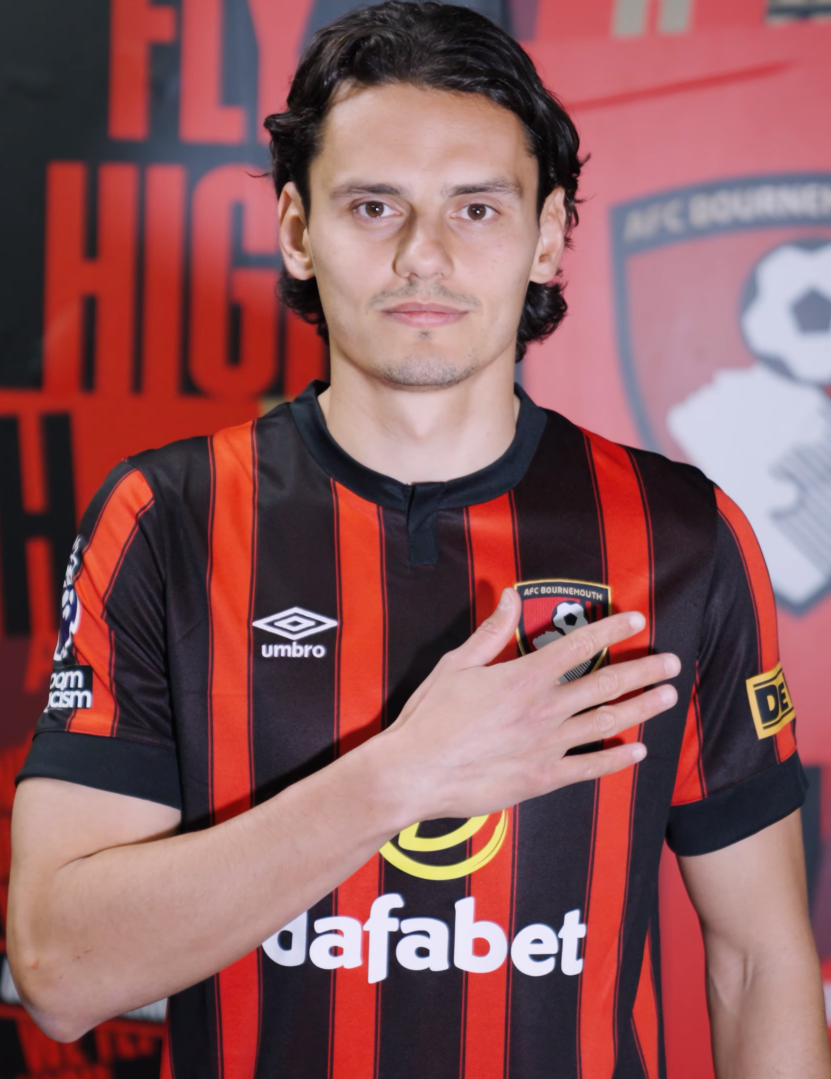
- Ünal with Bournemouth in 2024

Personal information
- Full name: Enes Ünal
- Date of birth: 10 May 1997 (age 29)
- Place of birth: Osmangazi, Turkey
- Height: 1.87 m (6 ft 2 in)
- Position: Striker

Team information
- Current team: Getafe
- Number: 19

Youth career
- 2006–2013: Bursaspor

Senior career*
Years	Team	Apps	(Gls)
2013–2015	Bursaspor	35	(4)
2015–2017	Manchester City	0	(0)
2015–2016	→ Genk (loan)	12	(1)
2016	→ NAC Breda (loan)	11	(9)
2016–2017	→ Twente (loan)	32	(18)
2017–2020	Villarreal	23	(5)
2017	→ Levante (loan)	7	(1)
2018–2020	→ Valladolid (loan)	68	(12)
2020–2024	Getafe	103	(34)
2024	→ Bournemouth (loan)	16	(2)
2024–2026	Bournemouth	39	(3)
2026–	Getafe	1	(0)

International career^{‡}
2012–2013	Turkey U16	24	(25)
2012–2014	Turkey U17	12	(9)
2014	Turkey U19	6	(6)
2013–2015	Turkey U21	13	(3)
2015–	Turkey	35	(3)
- * Club domestic league appearances and goals as of 23:36, 15 August 2026 (UTC) ‡ National team caps and goals as of 11:02, 13 November 2026

Enes Ünal (born 10 May 1997) is a Turkish professional footballer who plays as a striker for La Liga club Getafe.

Ünal scored on his Süper Lig debut on 25 August 2013 for Bursaspor against Galatasaray, making him the youngest player to net in Turkey's top division. An international at several youth levels, he earned his first senior cap on 31 March 2015 in a friendly against Luxembourg.

== Early life ==
Ünal was born in Osmangazi, Bursa, on 10 May 1997. His father, Mesut Ünal, was also a professional footballer who also played for Bursaspor and was a youth international for Turkey.

== Club career ==
=== Bursaspor ===
Ünal was promoted from the Bursaspor youth team. He made his professional debut against Vojvodina in the first leg of third qualifying round of 2013–14 UEFA Europa League on 1 August 2013, replacing Sebastián Pinto for the last five minutes of a 2–2 draw at Karađorđe.

On 25 August 2013, Ünal came off the bench for Ferhat Kiraz in the 71st minute to make his debut against Galatasaray, and scored his first league goal three minutes later with the assist by Pablo Batalla. This goal made him the youngest player to score in the Süper Lig. On 21 October, he scored his second league goal against Kayserispor with the assist by Şener Özbayraklı. On 19 December 2013, he came off the bench for Musa Çağıran in the 80th minute in the Turkish Cup game against İnegölspor, and scored Bursaspor's second goal via a free kick two minutes later, netting the third in the 86th minute. On 12 February 2014, he scored the third goal for Bursaspor against Akhisar Belediyespor in the cup group stages. They finished first in the group stage with 13 points and advanced to the semi-finals to face Galatasaray.

=== Manchester City ===
On 7 July 2015, Premier League club Manchester City announced Ünal's signing for a reported fee of £2 million, their first purchase of the summer. He made his debut against Adelaide United on a tour of Australia, in a 2–0 win.

On 31 July 2015, Manchester City announced that Ünal would be going out on loan to Belgian Pro League side Genk for two seasons. On 29 January 2016, his agreement was cancelled, and he returned to Manchester City.

On 1 February 2016, Ünal was loaned to Dutch club NAC Breda until end of the season; eighteen days later he scored on his debut against Fortuna Sittard. He scored his first career hat-trick on 11 April 2016 in a game against Telstar. On 23 July 2016, Ünal was loaned to Dutch club Twente for the 2016–17 season. On 21 August, he made his first start, scoring his second career hat-trick. He scored two more goals in his next game for the club, a 4–1 win over ADO Den Haag.

=== Villarreal ===
On 30 May 2017, Ünal joined La Liga side Villarreal for £12 million with a buy back option for Manchester City. He made his debut in the season opener, a 1–0 loss to Levante on 21 August. His first goal came on 10 September in a 3–1 win over Real Betis.

On 30 October 2017, Ünal joined Levante on an emergency loan deal until June 2018, with the option of a call back in January. He scored on his debut against Girona, on 5 November 2017, though the match ended in a 2–1 loss.

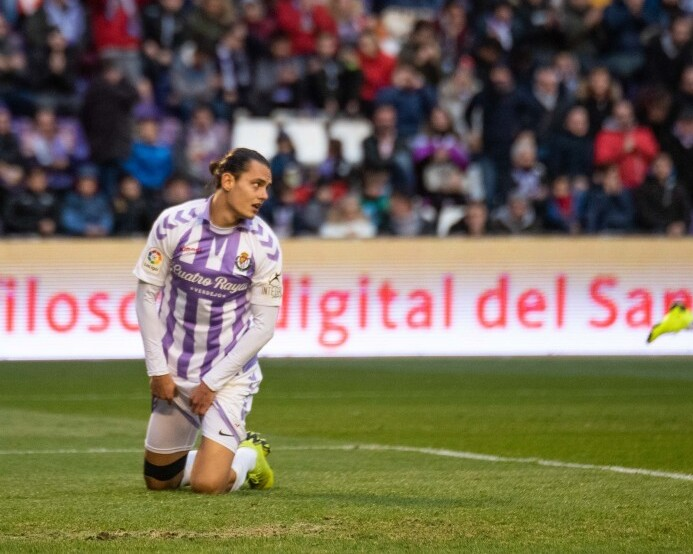
Ünal playing for Valladolid in 2018

On 26 December 2017, Villarreal exercised the call back option and Ünal rejoined the club three days later. The following 19 August, he joined newly promoted side Real Valladolid on a one-year loan deal. In 2019 July, his loan contract was extended until the end of 2019–20 season.

=== Getafe ===
On 12 August 2020, Getafe announced the signing of Ünal from Villarreal on a five-year contract.

=== Bournemouth ===
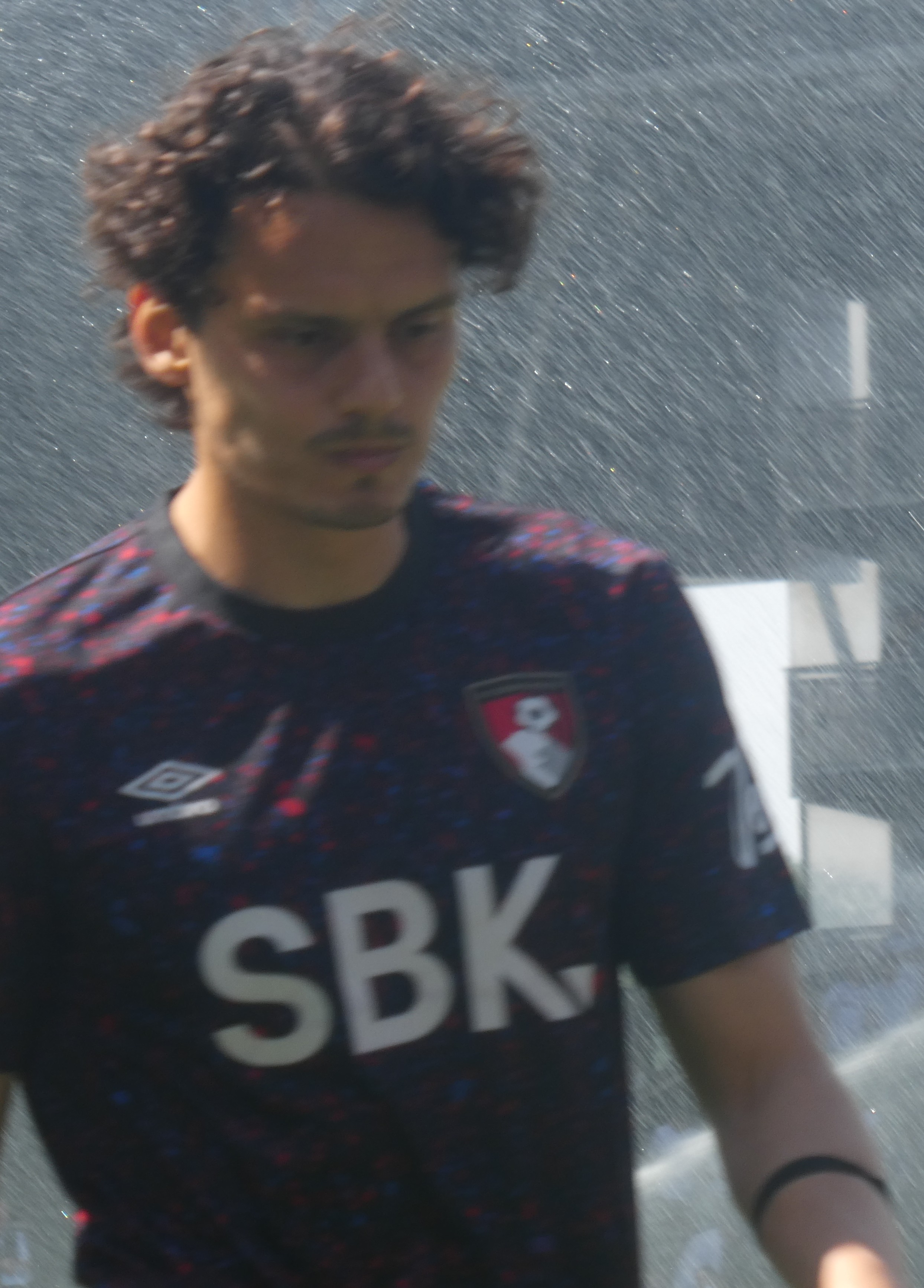
Ünal warming up before a match with Bournemouth in 2026

On 1 February 2024, Premier League club Bournemouth signed Ünal on a loan deal, with the obligation to make the move permanent if certain conditions are met. He scored his first goal for the club on 9 March, a stoppage-time equaliser in a 2–2 draw at home against Sheffield United. In the Cherries' following match against Luton Town, Ünal set up Antoine Semenyo's winning goal as Bournemouth came from 0–3 down to win 4–3. In doing so, they became only the fifth team in Premier League history to overturn a 3–0 deficit.

On 29 May 2024, the club announced that he had signed a four-year contract. In January 2025, Ünal suffered his second ACL injury in training, after a previous tear at Getafe, which would force him to miss the rest of the season following surgery. His first goal back from injury was a late equaliser at home hosting West Ham United on 22 November 2025, mirroring his last goal before injury, also a late equaliser at home against West Ham nearly a year earlier on 16 December 2024.

=== Return to Getafe ===
On 13 August 2026, Getafe announced Ünal's return on a three-year contract.

== International career ==
After scoring 25 goals in 24 games for the Turkey U16 side, he was quickly promoted to the U17s, and after scoring his first professional goal in 2013 was invited to join the Turkey U21 side, despite being just 16 years old. He scored his first U21 goal in 4–0 win against Malta. Ünal earned his first international cap at senior level on 31 March 2015, replacing Olcay Şahan in the 57th minute of a 2–1 friendly victory against Luxembourg at the Stade Josy Barthel. His second cap wouldn't come for over a year, appearing as a substitute in a friendly against Russia on 31 August 2016. On 30 September 2016, Ünal was called up for 2018 World Cup qualification matches against Ukraine and Iceland. He made his first start and competitive debut for Turkey against Ukraine, on 6 October, in a 2–2 draw. On 17 November 2019, Ünal scored his first two goals for Turkey in a 2–0 win against Andorra, during the UEFA Euro 2020 qualification. On 1 June 2021, he was selected in the 26-man squad for UEFA Euro 2020. On 24 May 2024, he was named in the 35-man preliminary squad for UEFA Euro 2024. However, on 1 June, he was withdrawn due to injury.

== Personal life ==
Ünal's family became Manchester City fans after Sergio Agüero's 94th-minute Premier League title-winning goal in 2012.

Ünal had been dating Lisa Smellers, a Belgian footballer who plays for Genk Ladies. The couple were married in December 2019. Their daughter, Lila Ela, was born in 2020.

== Career statistics ==
=== Club ===
As of match played 24 May 2026

Appearances and goals by club, season and competition
Club	Season	League			National cup (Note: Includes Turkish Cup, Belgian Cup, KNVB Cup, Copa del Rey, FA Cup)		League cup		Europe		Other		Total	
Club	Season	Division	Apps	Goals	Apps	Goals	Apps	Goals	Apps	Goals	Apps	Goals	Apps	Goals
Bursaspor	2013–14	Süper Lig	16	3	5	3	—		2 (Note: Appearances in UEFA Europa League)	0	—		23	6
Bursaspor	2014–15	Süper Lig	19	1	10	0	—		2	0	—		31	1
Bursaspor	Total		35	4	15	3	—		4	0	—		54	7
Genk (loan)	2015–16	Belgian Pro League	12	1	2	1	—		0	0	—		14	2
NAC Breda (loan)	2015–16	Eerste Divisie	11	8	0	0	—		—		3 (Note: Appearances in Eerste Divisie promotion play-offs)	0	14	8
Twente (loan)	2016–17	Eredivisie	32	18	1	1	—		—		—		33	19
Villarreal	2017–18	La Liga	23	5	3	0	—		5	0	—		31	5
Levante (loan)	2017–18	La Liga	7	1	0	0	—		—		—		7	1
Valladolid (loan)	2018–19	La Liga	33	6	1	0	—		—		—		34	6
Valladolid (loan)	2019–20	La Liga	35	6	2	2	—		—		—		37	8
Valladolid (loan)	Total		68	12	3	2	—		—		—		71	14
Getafe	2020–21	La Liga	28	4	1	1	—		—		—		29	5
Getafe	2021–22	La Liga	37	16	0	0	—		—		—		37	16
Getafe	2022–23	La Liga	35	14	3	1	—		—		—		38	15
Getafe	2023–24	La Liga	3	0	2	0	—		—		—		5	0
Getafe	Total		103	34	6	2	—		—		—		109	36
Bournemouth (loan)	2023–24	Premier League	16	2	1	0	—		—		—		17	2
Bournemouth	2024–25	Premier League	17	2	0	0	0	0	—		—		17	2
Bournemouth	2025–26	Premier League	22	1	1	0	0	0	—		—		23	1
Bournemouth	Bournemouth total		55	5	2	0	0	0	—		—		57	5
Getafe	2026–27	La Liga	0	0	0	0	—		0	0	—		0	0
Career total			346	88	32	9	0	0	9	0	3	0	390	97

=== International ===
As of match played 13 November 2026

Appearances and goals by national team and year
National team	Year	Apps	Goals
Turkey	2015	1	0
Turkey	2016	2	0
Turkey	2017	4	0
Turkey	2018	4	0
Turkey	2019	2	2
Turkey	2020	4	0
Turkey	2021	7	0
Turkey	2022	6	1
Turkey	2023	2	0
Turkey	2024	2	0
Turkey	2025	0	0
Turkey	2026	1	0
Total		35	3

As of match played 19 November 2022.
Scores and results list Turkey's goal tally first, score column indicates score after each Ünal goal.

List of international goals scored by Enes Ünal
No.	Date	Venue	Cap	Opponent	Score	Result	Competition
1	17 November 2019	Estadi Nacional, Andorra la Vella, Andorra	13	Andorra	1–0	2–0	UEFA Euro 2020 qualification
2	17 November 2019	Estadi Nacional, Andorra la Vella, Andorra	13	Andorra	2–0	2–0	UEFA Euro 2020 qualification
3	19 November 2022	Gaziantep Stadium, Gaziantep, Turkey	30	Czech Republic	1–0	2–1	Friendly
