= Adrián Liso =

Spanish footballer

Personal information
- Full name: Adrián Liso Lahoz
- Date of birth: 2 April 2005 (age 21)
- Place of birth: Zaragoza, Spain
- Height: 1.82 m (6 ft 0 in)
- Position: Winger

Team information
- Current team: Mallorca (on loan from Zaragoza)
- Number: 33

Youth career
- Montecarlo
- 2017–2023: Zaragoza

Senior career*
Years	Team	Apps	(Gls)
2022–2024	Zaragoza B	26	(3)
2024–	Zaragoza	52	(6)
2025–2026	→ Getafe (loan)	28	(3)
2026–	→ Mallorca (loan)	10	(0)

International career^{‡}
2025	Spain U20	6	(0)
- * Club domestic league appearances and goals as of 24 October 2026 ‡ National team caps and goals as of 11 October 2025

Adrián Liso Lahoz (born 2 April 2005) is a Spanish footballer who plays as a left winger for RCD Mallorca, on loan from Real Zaragoza.

== Club career ==
=== Real Zaragoza ===
Born in Zaragoza, Aragon, Liso joined Real Zaragoza's youth setup in 2017, from UD Montecarlo. He made his senior debut with the reserves on 16 October 2022, coming on as a second-half substitute in a 3–1 Segunda Federación away loss to SD Formentera.

Definitely promoted to the B's for the 2023–24 season, Liso scored his first senior goal on 10 September 2023, netting the third in a 3–0 home win over Náxara CD. The following 14 March, he renewed his contract until 2027.

Liso made his first team debut on 17 March 2024, replacing Víctor Mollejo in a 1–0 Segunda División home loss against RCD Espanyol. He scored his first goal on 20 April, netting the equalizer in a 2–1 away win over SD Huesca.

On 17 June 2024, Liso renewed his contract with the Maños until 2029. He established himself as a regular starter for the side during the campaign, featuring in 41 matches overall and scoring four goals.

==== Loan to Getafe ====
On 2 July 2025, Liso was loaned to La Liga side Getafe CF, for one year. He made his debut for the club on the away match against Celta Vigo and scored his first goal.

==== Loan to Mallorca ====
On 13 August 2026, after Zaragoza's relegation, Liso was loaned to second division side RCD Mallorca for one year.

== International career ==
Liso is a Spain youth international, having represented the country at the under-20 level for the 2025 FIFA U-20 World Cup in Chile.

== Career statistics ==
As of match played 24 October 2026

Appearances and goals by club, season and competition
Club	Season	League			Copa del Rey		Europe		Other		Total	
Club	Season	Division	Apps	Goals	Apps	Goals	Apps	Goals	Apps	Goals	Apps	Goals
Real Zaragoza B	2023–24	Segunda Federación	3	3	—		—		—		3	3
Real Zaragoza	2023–24	Segunda División	12	2	0	0	—		—		12	2
Real Zaragoza	2024–25	Segunda División	40	4	1	0	—		—		41	4
Real Zaragoza	Total		52	6	1	0	0	0	0	0	53	6
Getafe (loan)	2025–26	La Liga	28	3	3	0	—		—		31	3
Mallorca (loan)	2026–27	Segunda División	11	0	0	0	—		—		11	0
Career total			94	12	4	0	0	0	0	0	98	12

== Honours ==
Individual

- La Liga U23 Player of the Month: August 2025
