= Martín Satriano =

Uruguayan footballer (born 2001)

Personal information
- Full name: Martín Adrián Satriano Costa
- Date of birth: 20 February 2001 (age 25)
- Place of birth: Montevideo, Uruguay
- Height: 1.87 m (6 ft 2 in)
- Position: Forward

Team information
- Current team: Getafe
- Number: 10

Youth career
- 2015–2020: Nacional
- 2020–2021: Inter Milan

Senior career*
| Years | Team | Apps | (Gls) |
| 2021–2025 | Inter Milan | 4 | (0) |
| 2022 | → Brest (loan) | 15 | (4) |
| 2022–2023 | → Empoli (loan) | 31 | (2) |
| 2023–2024 | → Brest (loan) | 33 | (4) |
| 2024–2025 | → Lens (loan) | 7 | (0) |
| 2025–2026 | Lens | 0 | (0) |
| 2025–2026 | → Lyon (loan) | 11 | (2) |
| 2026 | Lyon | 0 | (0) |
| 2026 | → Getafe (loan) | 10 | (3) |
| 2026– | Getafe | 19 | (6) |

International career^{‡}
| 2022– | Uruguay | 2 | (0) |
- * Club domestic league appearances and goals as of 1 November 2026 ‡ National team caps and goals as of 18 November 2026

Martín Adrián Satriano Costa (born 20 February 2001) is a Uruguayan professional footballer who plays as a forward for La Liga club Getafe and the Uruguay national team.

== Club career ==
Satriano is a former youth academy player of Nacional. On 31 January 2020, Serie A club Inter Milan signed him on a contract until June 2024. He made his professional debut on 21 August 2021, coming on as a 77th-minute substitute for Hakan Çalhanoğlu in a 4–0 league win against Genoa.

On 17 January 2022, Satriano moved to Ligue 1 club Brest on loan until the end of the season. He scored his first two professional goals on 13 February in a 5–1 league win over Troyes. On 4 July 2022, he joined Empoli on a loan deal. He scored his first Serie A goal on 5 September in a 2–2 away draw against Salernitana.

On 14 July 2023, Satriano re-joined Brest on a season-long loan deal. On 23 August 2024, he moved to Lens on a season-long loan deal with an obligation to buy. His move to the club was made permanent ahead of the 2025–26 season.

On 1 September 2025, Satriano joined Lyon on a season-long loan deal with an option to buy. On 16 January 2026, Lyon exercised their option to make the transfer permanent and immediately loaned Satriano to Getafe in Spain. Two months later, on 30 March, Getafe activated their option to make the transfer permanent and signed him on a contract until June 2030.

== International career ==
Satriano made his debut for the Uruguay national team on 27 September 2022 in a 2–0 friendly win against Canada. On 21 October 2022, he was named in Uruguay's 55-man preliminary squad for the 2022 FIFA World Cup. However, he was not included in the final squad, which was announced three weeks later. After four years without a call-up, Satriano was recalled to the national team in September 2026.

== Personal life ==
Satriano is the son of former footballer Gerardo Satriano. He has four siblings, including Alejandro Satriano, who is also a professional footballer. Through his father, Satriano is of Italian descent, as his ancestors were originally from Tito, a municipality in Basilicata, and was eligible to represent Italy until he turned down the offer.

== Career statistics ==
=== Club ===
As of match played 1 November 2026

Appearances and goals by club, season and competition
| Club | Season | League | | | National cup (Note: Includes Coupe de France, Coppa Italia) | | Continental | | Total | |
| Club | Season | Division | Apps | Goals | Apps | Goals | Apps | Goals | Apps | Goals |
|---|---|---|---|---|---|---|---|---|---|---|
| Inter Milan | 2021–22 | Serie A | 4 | 0 | 0 | 0 | 0 | 0 | 4 | 0 |
| Inter Milan | 2022–23 | Serie A | 0 | 0 | 0 | 0 | 0 | 0 | 0 | 0 |
| Inter Milan | 2023–24 | Serie A | 0 | 0 | 0 | 0 | 0 | 0 | 0 | 0 |
| Inter Milan | 2024–25 | Serie A | 0 | 0 | 0 | 0 | 0 | 0 | 0 | 0 |
| Inter Milan | Total | | 4 | 0 | 0 | 0 | 0 | 0 | 4 | 0 |
| Brest (loan) | 2021–22 | Ligue 1 | 15 | 4 | 1 | 0 | — | | 16 | 4 |
| Empoli (loan) | 2022–23 | Serie A | 31 | 2 | 1 | 0 | — | | 32 | 2 |
| Brest (loan) | 2023–24 | Ligue 1 | 33 | 4 | 3 | 2 | — | | 36 | 6 |
| Lens (loan) | 2024–25 | Ligue 1 | 7 | 0 | 0 | 0 | 0 | 0 | 7 | 0 |
| Lens | 2025–26 | Ligue 1 | 0 | 0 | 0 | 0 | — | | 0 | 0 |
| Lens | Lens total | | 7 | 0 | 0 | 0 | 0 | 0 | 7 | 0 |
| Lyon (loan) | 2025–26 | Ligue 1 | 11 | 2 | 2 | 0 | 6 (Note: Appearances in UEFA Europa League) | 1 | 19 | 3 |
| Lyon | 2025–26 | Ligue 1 | 0 | 0 | 0 | 0 | 0 | 0 | 0 | 0 |
| Lyon | Lyon total | | 11 | 2 | 2 | 0 | 6 | 1 | 19 | 3 |
| Getafe (loan) | 2025–26 | La Liga | 10 | 3 | — | | — | | 10 | 3 |
| Getafe | 2025–26 | La Liga | 8 | 3 | — | | — | | 8 | 3 |
| Getafe | 2026–27 | La Liga | 11 | 3 | 1 | 0 | 4 (Note: Appearances in UEFA Conference League) | 0 | 16 | 3 |
| Getafe | Getafe total | | 29 | 9 | 1 | 0 | 4 | 0 | 34 | 9 |
| Career total | | | 130 | 21 | 8 | 2 | 10 | 1 | 148 | 24 |

=== International ===
As of match played 17 November 2026

Appearances and goals by national team and year
| National team | Year | Apps | Goals |
|---|---|---|---|
| Uruguay | 2022 | 1 | 0 |
| Uruguay | 2026 | 1 | 0 |
| Total | | 2 | 0 |
