= Jorge Montes (footballer) =

Spanish footballer (born 2004)

Personal information
- Full name: Jorge Montes García
- Date of birth: 6 March 2004 (age 22)
- Place of birth: Gijón, Spain
- Height: 1.88 m (6 ft 2 in)
- Positions: Left-back; winger

Team information
- Current team: Getafe B
- Number: 21

Youth career
- Inmaculada
- 2014–2023: Sporting Gijón

Senior career*
Years	Team	Apps	(Gls)
2021–2025	Sporting B	73	(2)
2025–	Getafe B	19	(0)
2025–	Getafe	1	(0)
- * Club domestic league appearances and goals as of 7 May 2026

Jorge Montes García (born 6 March 2004) is a Spanish professional footballer who plays as either a left-back or a left winger for Getafe CF B.

== Career ==
Montes was born in Gijón, Asturias, and joined Sporting de Gijón's Mareo from Colegio de la Inmaculada. He renewed his contract with the club on 23 March 2021, and made his senior debut with the reserves the following 5 January, playing the last eight minutes of a 1–0 Tercera División RFEF home win over CD Covadonga.

On 13 August 2025, after establishing himself as a starter for Sporting's B-team, Montes moved to Getafe CF and was initially assigned to the B-side in Segunda Federación. He made his first team debut with the latter on 2 December, starting and scoring the winner on extra time in a 3–2 away win over CDA Navalcarnero, for the season's Copa del Rey.

Montes made his professional debut on 18 December 2025, playing the full 90 minutes in a 3–1 away loss to Burgos CF, also for the national cup.
