= Yassin Tallal =

Moroccan footballer

Personal information
- Full name: Yassin Tallal Amiri
- Date of birth: 3 February 2005 (age 21)
- Place of birth: Madrid, Spain
- Height: 1.73 m (5 ft 8 in)
- Position: Winger

Team information
- Current team: Real Unión (on loan from Getafe)

Youth career
- 2014–2023: Rayo Majadahonda
- 2023–2024: Getafe

Senior career*
Years	Team	Apps	(Gls)
2024–2026	Getafe B	58	(1)
2024–	Getafe	1	(0)
2026–	→ Real Unión (loan)	0	(0)

International career^{‡}
2024	Morocco U20	2	(1)
- * Club domestic league appearances and goals as of 7 May 2026 ‡ National team caps and goals as of 21 March 2024

Yassin Tallal Amiri (Arabic: ياسين طلال عميري; born 3 February 2005) is a professional footballer who plays mainly as a left winger for Spanish club Real Unión, on loan from Getafe CF. Born in Spain, he represented Morocco at under-20 level.

== Club career ==
Born in Madrid to Moroccan parents, Tallal joined CF Rayo Majadahonda's youth setup in 2014, aged nine. Ahead of the 2023–24 season, he moved to Getafe CF and was initially assigned to the Juvenil A squad.

Tallal made his senior debut with the reserves on 7 January 2024, coming on as a late substitute in a 2–0 Segunda Federación home win over UD San Fernando. He made his first team – and La Liga – debut on 21 April, replacing Óscar Rodríguez late into a 1–1 home draw against Real Sociedad.

On 1 July 2024, Tallal was definitely promoted to the B-team. On 19 August 2026, he was loaned to Primera Federación side Real Unión, for one year.

== International career ==
Eligible to represent either Spain or Morocco, Tallal was called up to the latter's under-20 side on 17 January 2024. He featured in two friendlies against Mauritania in the month, scoring one goal in the process.
