= Mario Martín =

Spanish footballer (born 2004)

Personal information
- Full name: Mario Martín Rielves
- Date of birth: 5 March 2004 (age 22)
- Place of birth: Sonseca, Spain
- Height: 1.78 m (5 ft 10 in)
- Position: Midfielder

Team information
- Current team: Getafe
- Number: 6

Youth career
- 2011–2014: Sonseca
- 2014–2015: Toledo
- 2015–2016: Odelot Toletum
- 2016–2022: Real Madrid

Senior career*
Years	Team	Apps	(Gls)
2021–2024	Real Madrid B	77	(0)
2023–2026	Real Madrid	2	(0)
2024–2025	→ Valladolid (loan)	30	(0)
2025–2026	→ Getafe (loan)	35	(2)
2026–	Getafe	0	(0)

International career^{‡}
2022–2023	Spain U19	7	(0)
2025–	Spain U21	5	(0)
- * Club domestic league appearances and goals as of 26 May 2026 ‡ National team caps and goals as of 27 March 2026

Mario Martín Rielves (born 5 March 2004) is a Spanish professional footballer who plays as a midfielder for La Liga club Getafe.

== Club career ==
=== Early career ===
Born in Sonseca, Toledo, Castilla–La Mancha, Martín played for hometown side CD Sonseca, and later represented the youth sides of CD Toledo and EFB Odelot Toletum before joining Real Madrid's La Fábrica in 2016. He made his senior debut with the latter's reserves during the 2021–22 season, in Primera División RFEF.

=== Real Madrid ===
Martín made his first team debut with Real Madrid on 26 January 2023, coming on as an extra-time substitute for Rodrygo in a 3–1 home win over rivals Atlético Madrid, for the campaign's Copa del Rey. He made his La Liga debut on 14 May of the following year, replacing Federico Valverde late into a 5–0 home routing of Deportivo Alavés.

==== Loan to Valladolid ====
On 23 August 2024, Martín joined Real Valladolid in the top tier on a one-year loan deal.

==== Loan to Getafe ====
The following 29 July, after suffering relegation, Martín moved to fellow league team Getafe also in a temporary deal. He scored his first goal for the club in the home match against Real Oviedo.

=== Getafe ===
On 28 May 2026, Getafe exercised their option to sign Martín permanently from Real Madrid. He signed a four-year contract until 30 June 2030.

== International career ==
Martín is a youth international for Spain. He has previously played for the under-19s side.

He received his first call-up to the Spain U21 in October 2025 for a friendly match against Norway and a 2027 UEFA European Under-21 Championship qualification match against Finland. He made his debut and started in both matches.

== Career statistics ==
=== Club ===
As of 23 May 2026

Appearances and goals by club, season and competition
Club	Season	League			Copa del Rey		Other		Total	
Club	Season	Division	Apps	Goals	Apps	Goals	Apps	Goals	Apps	Goals
Real Madrid Castilla	2021–22	Primera División RFEF	20	0	—		—		20	0
Real Madrid Castilla	2022–23	Primera Federación	26	0	—		4 (Note: Appearances in 2023 Primera Federación play-offs)	0	30	0
Real Madrid Castilla	2023–24	Primera Federación	27	0	—		—		27	0
Real Madrid Castilla	Total		73	0	—		4	0	77	0
Real Madrid	2022–23	La Liga	0	0	1	0	0	0	1	0
Real Madrid	2023–24	La Liga	2	0	1	0	0	0	3	0
Real Madrid	Total		2	0	2	0	0	0	4	0
Real Valladolid (loan)	2024–25	La Liga	30	0	2	0	—		32	0
Getafe (loan)	2025–26	La Liga	35	2	2	2	—		37	4
Career total			140	2	6	2	4	0	150	4

== Honours ==
Real Madrid

- La Liga: 2023–24
- Copa del Rey: 2022–23
- Supercopa de España: 2024
- UEFA Champions League: 2023–24
- FIFA Club World Cup: 2022
