= Álex Sancris =

Spanish footballer

Personal information
- Full name: Alejandro San Cristóbal Sánchez
- Date of birth: 18 January 1997 (age 29)
- Place of birth: Madrid, Spain
- Height: 1.77 m (5 ft 10 in)
- Position: Winger

Team information
- Current team: Leganés (on loan from Getafe)

Youth career
- Getafe
- Trival Valderas

Senior career*
| Years | Team | Apps | (Gls) |
| 2016–2017 | Trival Valderas B | 14 | (1) |
| 2016–2018 | Trival Valderas | 41 | (4) |
| 2018–2022 | Leganés B | 114 | (22) |
| 2022–2023 | Linares | 37 | (4) |
| 2023–2025 | Burgos | 76 | (11) |
| 2025– | Getafe | 18 | (0) |
| 2026– | → Leganés (loan) | 0 | (0) |
- * Club domestic league appearances and goals as of 27 May 2026

Alejandro San Cristóbal Sánchez (born 18 January 1997), known as Álex Sancris, is a Spanish footballer who plays mainly as a right winger for CD Leganés, on loan from Getafe CF.

== Club career ==
Born in Madrid, Sancris represented Getafe CF and CF Trival Valderas as a youth. He made his senior debut with the latter's reserves in the 2015–16 season, in the regional leagues, and started to feature with the main squad in Tercera División in 2016.

On 7 July 2018, after becoming a regular starter for Trival during the campaign, Sancris signed a contract with CD Leganés, being assigned to the reserves also in the fourth division. The following 27 June, he renewed his contract with the club, and subsequently became a captain of the B-team as they achieved promotion to Segunda División RFEF in 2021.

On 13 July 2022, Sancris agreed to a deal with Primera Federación side Linares Deportivo. An undisputed starter for the side, he contributed with four goals and 10 assists in 40 matches overall, as the club narrowly missed out a play-off spot.

On 5 June 2023, Sancris was announced at Burgos CF in Segunda División, after signing a two-year contract. He made his professional debut at the age of 26 on 13 August, coming on as a second-half substitute for Miki Muñoz in a 1–1 home draw against SD Huesca.

Sancris scored his first professional goal on 12 November 2023, netting his team's fourth in a 4–2 home win over AD Alcorcón. He became an undisputed starter for the side in the 2024–25 season, scoring seven goals.

On 2 July 2025, Sancris returned to his first club Getafe on a three-year deal, now a member of the first team in La Liga. He made his debut in the category on 21 September, replacing Adrián Liso late into a 3–0 away loss to FC Barcelona.

On 25 August 2026, Sancris was loaned to Lega for the campaign.
