= Djené =

Togolese footballer

Personal information
- Full name: Djené Dakonam Ortega
- Date of birth: 31 December 1991 (age 34)
- Place of birth: Dapaong, Togo
- Height: 1.78 m (5 ft 10 in)
- Positions: Centre-back; defensive midfielder; right-back

Team information
- Current team: Getafe
- Number: 2

Youth career
- Étoile Filante

Senior career*
Years	Team	Apps	(Gls)
2009–2011	Tonnerre d'Abomey		
2011–2014	Coton Sport		
2014–2016	Alcorcón	59	(1)
2016–2017	Sint-Truidense	19	(0)
2017–	Getafe	304	(1)

International career^{‡}
2010	Togo U20		
2012–	Togo	93	(1)
- * Club domestic league appearances and goals as of 27 May 2026 ‡ National team caps and goals as of 9 June 2026

Djené Dakonam Ortega (born 31 December 1991), known mononymously as Djené, is a Togolese professional footballer who plays for and captains both La Liga club Getafe and the Togo national team. Mainly a centre-back, he can also play as a right-back and as a defensive midfielder.

== Club career ==
Born in Dapaong, Togo, Djené moved to Benin in 2009, after graduating from Étoile Filante du Togo's youth setup, joining Tonnerre d'Abomey. In 2011, he moved to Coton Sport in Cameroon's Elite One, appearing regularly afterwards.

Djené was named in the Coton Sport's squad for the 2012 CAF Champions League campaign. In November 2013, he went on a trial at Ligue 2 side RC Lens, only returning to his parent club six months later.

In August 2014, Djené went on trial with Spanish side AD Alcorcón, joining the club permanently on 25 October. He made his Segunda División debut on the following day, starting in a 1–3 home loss against Real Zaragoza.

On 23 March 2015, after already being a regular starter for the Madrid side, Djené renewed his contract until 2018. On 9 May, he scored his first professional goal, netting the game's only in an away success at CE Sabadell FC. On 1 July 2016, Djené was transferred to Belgian First Division A club Sint-Truidense.

On 24 July of the following year, he returned to Spain, after agreeing to a four-year deal with La Liga side Getafe CF. Djené's debut in the top division of Spanish football came on 20 August 2017, starting in a 0–0 away draw against Athletic Bilbao. He scored his first goal in the category on 17 March 2018, netting the equalizer in a 2–1 away defeat of Real Sociedad. On 5 April 2026, Djené became the second-most-capped player in Getafe history, surpassing Angelillo with his 320th official appearance for the club in a 2–0 win over Athletic Bilbao, with only Pedro Caballero (335) ahead of him in the all-time rankings.

== International career ==
Djené was named in Togo's main squad for the 2011 WAFU Nations Cup, shortly after being called up by Benin. He made his international debut on 8 September 2012, starting in a 1–1 draw against Gabon.

Djené was included in Didier Six's 23-man squad for the 2013 Africa Cup of Nations, and appeared in all of Togo's matches during the tournament, being eventually knocked out in the quarter-finals. He has made over 65 appearances for Togo.

== Career statistics ==
=== Club ===
As of match played 17 May 2026

Appearances and goals by club, season and competition
Club	Season	League			National cup		Continental		Other		Total	
Club	Season	Division	Apps	Goals	Apps	Goals	Apps	Goals	Apps	Goals	Apps	Goals
Coton Sport	2013	Elite One	—		—		6 (Note: Appearances in CAF Champions League)	0	—		6	0
Coton Sport	2014	Elite One	—		—		4	0	—		4	0
Coton Sport	Total		—		—		10	0	—		10	0
Alcorcón	2014–15	Segunda División	24	1	0	0	—		—		24	1
Alcorcón	2015–16	Segunda División	35	0	0	0	—		—		35	0
Alcorcón	Total		59	1	0	0	—		—		59	1
Sint-Truidense	2016–17	Belgian Pro League	19	0	1	0	7 (Note: Appearances in UEFA Europa League)	0	—		27	0
Sint-Truidense	2017–18	Belgian Pro League	0	0	0	0	—		—		0	0
Sint-Truidense	Total		19	0	1	0	7	0	—		27	0
Getafe	2017–18	La Liga	36	1	0	0	—		—		36	1
Getafe	2018–19	La Liga	34	0	4	0	—		—		38	0
Getafe	2019–20	La Liga	34	0	1	0	7	0	—		42	0
Getafe	2020–21	La Liga	34	0	2	0	—		—		36	0
Getafe	2021–22	La Liga	35	0	0	0	—		—		35	0
Getafe	2022–23	La Liga	33	0	3	0	—		—		36	0
Getafe	2023–24	La Liga	33	0	1	0	—		—		34	0
Getafe	2024–25	La Liga	31	0	4	0	—		—		35	0
Getafe	2025–26	La Liga	34	0	0	0	—		—		34	0
Getafe	Total		304	1	15	0	7	0	—		326	1
Career total			382	2	16	0	24	0	0	0	422	2

=== International ===
As of match played 9 June 2026

Appearances and goals by national team and year
National team	Year	Apps	Goals
Togo	2012	3	0
Togo	2013	10 (Note: Includes two non-FIFA matches)	0
Togo	2014	4	0
Togo	2015	5	0
Togo	2016	8	0
Togo	2017	12	0
Togo	2018	5	0
Togo	2019	7	0
Togo	2020	3	0
Togo	2021	9	0
Togo	2022	4	0
Togo	2023	6	0
Togo	2024	8	0
Togo	2025	5	0
Togo	2026	4	1
Total		93	1

Scores and results list Togo's goal tally first.

List of international goals scored by Djené
No.	Date	Venue	Opponent	Score	Result	Competition
1	9 June 2026	El Bachir Stadium, Mohammedia, Morocco	Benin	3–1	5–1	Friendly

== Honours ==
Coton Sport

- Elite One: 2013, 2014
- Cameroonian Cup: 2014

Individual

- UEFA La Liga Team of The Season: 2018–19
