= Christantus Uche =

Nigerian footballer

Personal information
- Full name: Christantus Ugonna Uche
- Date of birth: 19 May 2003 (age 23)
- Place of birth: Owerri, Nigeria
- Height: 1.90 m (6 ft 3 in)
- Position: Forward

Team information
- Current team: Getafe

Senior career*
Years	Team	Apps	(Gls)
2022–2023	Moralo B	6	(1)
2023	Moralo	11	(0)
2023–2024	Ceuta	34	(0)
2024–	Getafe	36	(5)
2025–2026	→ Crystal Palace (loan)	14	(0)

International career^{‡}
2025–	Nigeria	3	(0)
- * Club domestic league appearances and goals as of 5 March 2026 ‡ National team caps and goals as of 9 September 2025

Christantus Ugonna Uche (born 19 May 2003) is a Nigerian professional footballer who plays as a forward for La Liga club Getafe, and the Nigeria national team.

== Club career ==
=== Moralo ===
Born in Owerri, Uche played amateur football with his friends in his hometown, before receiving an offer from Spanish club Moralo in July 2022; Uche was officially announced by the club in November, and was initially assigned to the reserves in Primera División Extremeña. He made his senior debut with the B-team on 20 November, starting in a 2–1 away loss to Moraleja, and scored his first goal seven days later in a 4–0 home routing of Jaraíz.

Uche made his first team debut for Moralo on 8 January 2023, coming on as a second-half substitute in a 4–1 Tercera Federación home success over Villafranca. He subsequently established himself as a regular starter, as his side missed out promotion in the play-offs.

=== Ceuta ===
On 15 July 2023, Uche signed for Primera Federación side Ceuta, being initially assigned to the B-team, but making the pre-season with the main squad. However, he did not feature for the B's, and established himself as a key unit in the Caballas' centre of midfield; in January 2024, Spanish media outlet Mundo Deportivo reported that he was a target of Betis.

=== Getafe ===
On 21 February 2024, it was reported that Uche had agreed to a deal with La Liga side Getafe, with Ceuta manager José Juan Romero confirming the transfer two days later. Both clubs officially announced the transfer on 13 June, with the player signing a four-year contract with the Madrid outskirts side.

Uche made his professional – and top tier – debut on 15 August 2024, starting as a forward and scoring the equalizer in a 1–1 away draw against Athletic Bilbao.

==== Loan to Crystal Palace ====
On 1 September 2025, Uche signed for Premier League club Crystal Palace on loan until June 2026, with an obligation to buy of around £17.3 million. Later that year, on 11 December, he scored his first goal for the club in a 3–0 away win over Shelbourne in the UEFA Conference League.

==== Return to Getafe ====
On 6 August 2026, Uche suffered tears to both his anterior cruciate ligament (ACL) and lateral collateral ligament (LCL), along with significant meniscus damage and fractures around the knee, following a heavy tackle from Christian Mawissa during a pre-season friendly against AS Monaco, with doctors expecting him to be sidelined for approximately 12 months.

== International career ==
Uche was called up to the senior Nigeria national team for the friendly 2025 Unity Cup tournament in May 2025. He scored the winning penalty against Jamaica to win the tournament for the Super Eagles.

== Career statistics ==
=== Club ===
As of match played 5 March 2026

Appearances and goals by club, season and competition
Club	Season	League			National cup (Note: Includes Copa del Rey, FA Cup)		League cup (Note: Includes EFL Cup)		Europe		Other		Total	
Club	Season	Division	Apps	Goals	Apps	Goals	Apps	Goals	Apps	Goals	Apps	Goals	Apps	Goals
Moralo B	2022–23	Primera Extremeña	6	0	—		—		—		—		6	0
Moralo	2022–23	Tercera Federación	11	0	—		—		—		3 (Note: Appearances in Tercera Federación promotion play-offs)	0	14	0
Ceuta	2023–24	Primera Federación	34	0	—		—		—		2 (Note: Appearances in Primera Federación promotion play-offs)	0	36	0
Getafe	2024–25	La Liga	33	4	5	0	—		—		—		39	4
Getafe	2025–26	La Liga	3	1	—		—		—		—		3	1
Getafe	Total		36	5	5	0	—		—		—		41	5
Crystal Palace (loan)	2025–26	Premier League	14	0	1	0	3	0	4 (Note: Appearances in UEFA Conference League)	2	—		22	2
Career total			101	5	6	0	3	0	4	2	5	0	119	7

=== International ===
As of match played 9 September 2025

Appearances and goals by national team and year
National team	Year	Apps	Goals
Nigeria	2025	3	0
Total		3	0

== Honours ==
Crystal Palace

- UEFA Conference League: 2025–26
