= Alberto Risco =

Spanish footballer (born 2005)

Personal information
- Full name: Alberto Risco Alcántara
- Date of birth: 30 August 2005 (age 21)
- Place of birth: Córdoba, Spain
- Height: 1.78 m (5 ft 10 in)
- Position: Attacking midfielder

Team information
- Current team: Getafe B
- Number: 14

Youth career
- 2012–2020: Real Madrid
- 2020–2024: Getafe

Senior career*
Years	Team	Apps	(Gls)
2024–	Getafe	9	(0)
2024–	Getafe B	32	(0)
- * Club domestic league appearances and goals as of 7 May 2026

Alberto Risco Alcántara (born 30 August 2005) is a Spanish professional footballer who plays as an attacking midfielder for Getafe CF B.

== Career ==
Born in Córdoba, Andalusia, Risco joined Real Madrid's La Fábrica in 2012, aged seven, and received national notoriety during the 2017 edition of LaLiga Promises tournament held in New Jersey after scoring in an individual effort. He left Los Blancos in 2020 after playing for the Cadete B squad, and joined the youth sides of Getafe CF shortly after.

On 27 April 2024, before even having appeared for the reserves, Risco made his professional – and La Liga – debut, coming on as a late substitute for Luis Milla in a 3–1 away win against UD Almería, which certified the Andalusians' relegation.

In July 2024, Risco renewed his contract and was promoted to the B-team in Segunda Federación.
