= Davinchi =

Spanish footballer (born 2007)

Personal information
- Full name: David Cordón Mancha
- Date of birth: 16 October 2007 (age 19)
- Place of birth: Huelva, Spain
- Height: 1.82 m (6 ft 0 in)
- Position: Left-back

Team information
- Current team: Getafe
- Number: 3

Youth career
- 2012–2017: Recreativo
- 2017–2022: Betis
- 2022–2024: Recreativo

Senior career*
Years	Team	Apps	(Gls)
2024	Recreativo B	1	(0)
2024–2025	Recreativo	32	(2)
2025–	Getafe	14	(0)

International career^{‡}
2024–	Spain U18	4	(0)
2025–	Spain U19	3	(0)
- * Club domestic league appearances and goals as of 27 May 2026 ‡ National team caps and goals as of 9 September 2025

David Cordón Mancha (born 16 October 2007), commonly known as Davinchi, is a Spanish footballer who plays as a left-back for La Liga club Getafe CF.

== Club career ==
=== Recreativo ===
Born in Huelva, Andalusia, Davinchi began his career with hometown side Recreativo de Huelva at the age of five. He moved to the youth categories of Real Betis in 2012, but left after five years and subsequently returned to Recre.

On 6 December 2023, while still a youth, Davinchi signed his first professional contract with Recreativo at the age of 16. In May of the following year, he was called up straight to the first team for a Primera Federación match against UD Ibiza, remaining an unused substitute in the 1–0 home win.

After being with the main squad during the 2024 pre-season, Davinchi made his senior debut on 25 August of that year, starting, scoring his side's second and providing an assist to Álex Gálvez's equalizer in a 3–3 away draw against Mérida AD; aged 16 years, 10 months and 9 days, he became the third-youngest player to score in the third division since its establishment in 2021 (only behind Marc Bernal and Álvaro Leiva). He was a regular starter for Recreativo during the campaign, scoring twice in 32 appearances as they suffered relegation.

=== Getafe ===
On 19 June 2025, several Spanish media outlets reported that La Liga club Getafe CF paid Davinchi's €650,000 release clause; despite that, Recreativo considered "insufficient" and expressed their discomfort over the move, as his release clause would increase to €1.5 million on 1 July. On 3 July, however, Getafe announced his signing on a three-year deal, with Recreativo going to Court and demanding the 1.5 million fee.

Davinchi made his professional – and top tier – debut on 17 August 2025, starting in a 2–0 away win over RC Celta de Vigo.

== International career ==
In October 2024, Davinchi received his first call-up to the Spain national under-18 team, and would feature regularly for the side in the following months.

== Personal life ==
Davinchi's father, also named David, played for several years in the Spain national beach soccer team, playing with the likes of Quique Setién and Ramiro Amarelle. His father died in the Adamuz train accident on 18 January 2026.
