= Getafe CF B =

Getafe B
- Full name: Getafe Club de Fútbol B, S.A.D.
- Nicknames: Azulones (Dark Blues), El Geta
- Founded: 1983; 43 years ago
- Ground: Ciudad Deportiva Getafe CF, Getafe, Community of Madrid, Spain
- Capacity: 1,500
- President: Ángel Torres Sánchez
- Head coach: Manu del Moral
- League: Segunda Federación – Group 5
- 2025–26: Segunda Federación – Group 5, 4th of 18
Home colours	Away colours	Third colours

Getafe Club de Fútbol "B" is the reserve team of Getafe CF, club based in Getafe, a city in the Community of Madrid, Spain. Founded in 1983, it currently plays in Segunda Federación – Group 5 holding home games at Ciudad Deportiva Getafe CF.

== History ==
Getafe B was founded at the same time as the first team, in 1983, reaching the fourth division for the first time 11 years later and being relegated after just one season. In 1998 it returned again to the category, lasting three years and never finishing in higher than the 14th position.

In the 2004–05 campaign, as the main squad first appeared in La Liga, the reserves returned to the fourth level, going on to stabilize in that division in the following years. In 2010, after two unsuccessful playoff visits, the club promoted to level three for the first time ever. In the first season there the club reached 7th position among 20 teams. The 2011-12 season was slightly worse, as Getafe B finished in the 8th position. In the 2018-19 season Getafe B became the champion of the Tercera División, Group 7. The start of the season in Segunda División B posed challenges for the club, with only 4 victories in the first 14 games.

== Season to season ==
- As Getafe Promesas

Season	Tier	Division	Place	Copa del Rey
1983–84	9	3ª Reg. O.	1st	
1984–85	8	3ª Reg.	1st	
1985–86	7	2ª Reg.	3rd	
1986–87	6	1ª Reg.	1st	
1987–88	5	Reg. Pref.	5th	

- As Getafe CF B

Season	Tier	Division	Place
1990–91	8	3ª Reg.	1st
1991–92	7	2ª Reg.	1st
1992–93	6	1ª Reg.	2nd
1993–94	5	Reg. Pref.	2nd
1994–95	4	3ª	18th
1995–96	5	Reg. Pref.	5th
1996–97	5	Reg. Pref.	9th
1997–98	5	Reg. Pref.	1st
1998–99	4	3ª	17th
1999–2000	4	3ª	14th
2000–01	4	3ª	18th
2001–02	5	Pref.	6th
2002–03	5	Pref.	8th
2003–04	5	Pref.	1st
2004–05	4	3ª	9th
2005–06	4	3ª	4th
2006–07	4	3ª	2nd
2007–08	4	3ª	5th
2008–09	4	3ª	6th
2009–10	4	3ª	3rd

Season	Tier	Division	Place
2010–11	3	2ª B	7th
2011–12	3	2ª B	8th
2012–13	3	2ª B	10th
2013–14	3	2ª B	14th
2014–15	3	2ª B	11th
2015–16	3	2ª B	20th
2016–17	4	3ª	6th
2017–18	4	3ª	2nd
2018–19	4	3ª	1st
2019–20	3	2ª B	19th
2020–21	3	2ª B	10th / 7th
2021–22	5	3ª RFEF	8th
2022–23	5	3ª Fed.	3rd
2023–24	4	2ª Fed.	4th
2024–25	4	2ª Fed.	5th
2025–26	4	2ª Fed.	4th
2026–27	4	2ª Fed.	

- 8 seasons in Segunda División B
- 4 seasons in Segunda Federación
- 13 seasons in Tercera División
- 2 seasons in Tercera Federación/Tercera División RFEF

== Current squad ==
As of 7 September 2026

Note: Flags indicate national team as defined under FIFA eligibility rules; some limited exceptions apply. Players may hold more than one non-FIFA nationality.

No.	Pos.	Nation	Player
1	GK	ESP	Diego Ferrer
2	DF	ESP	Agus Moreno
3	DF	ESP	Jorge Montes
4	DF	ESP	Hugo García
5	DF	AND	Ian Olivera
6	MF	ESP	Jesús Martínez
7	FW	ESP	George Andrews (on loan from Córdoba)
8	FW	ESP	Álex Lozano
9	FW	ESP	Joselu Pérez
10	MF	ESP	Adrián Riquelme
11	MF	ESP	Isra Motos
12	DF	SRB	Ivan Vasiljević
13	GK	ESP	Jorge Benito

No.	Pos.	Nation	Player
15	DF	MAR	Moha Hamdoune
16	MF	ESP	Ginés Sorroche
17	DF	ESP	Curro Burgos
18	FW	ESP	Marcos Denia
19	FW	MAR	Moha Achraf
20	MF	ESP	Mady Macalou
21	FW	GAM	Ebrahima Drammeh
22	MF	ESP	Adri Martín (on loan from Betis)
23	DF	UKR	Vladyslav Kysil (on loan from Ponferradina)
24	MF	BOL	Óscar López
26	FW	ESP	Sebas Salazar
—	GK	CZE	Đorđije Medenica
—	MF	ESP	Alberto Risco

=== From Youth Academy ===
Note: Flags indicate national team as defined under FIFA eligibility rules; some limited exceptions apply. Players may hold more than one non-FIFA nationality.

No.	Pos.	Nation	Player
29	FW	SEN	Ibrahima Danfakha

== Club officials ==
=== Current technical staff ===
Position	Staff
Manager	(Spain) Manu del Moral
Assistant manager	(Spain) Mario Jiménez
Fitness coach	(Spain) Daniel Castro Simancas (Spain) Alejandro Martínez Macías
Goalkeeping coach	(Spain) Salvador Sánchez de Lope
Delegate	(Spain) Chiqui
Match delegate	(Spain) Daniel López
Kit man	(Romania) Mihai Leontin Nicolescu
Physiotherapist	(Spain) Sergio Laporta (Spain) Alba Torres Vega

Last updated: 31 January 2025
Source: Getafe CF

== Stadium ==
Getafe B holds home games at Ciudad Deportiva de Getafe, which has a 1,500-spectators capacity. It is located adjacent to the Coliseum Alfonso Pérez, the first team's grounds.
