= Getafe CF =

Spanish professional football club

Getafe
- Full name: Getafe Club de Fútbol, S.A.D.
- Nicknames: Geta; Azulones (Deep Blue Ones)
- Founded: 8 July 1983; 43 years ago
- Stadium: Estadio Coliseum
- Capacity: 16,500
- Owner: Ángel Torres
- President: Ángel Torres
- Head coach: José Bordalás
- League: La Liga
- 2025–26: La Liga, 7th of 20
- Website: getafecf.com
Home colours	Away colours	Third colours

Getafe Club de Fútbol, S.A.D. (Spanish pronunciation: [xeˈtafe ˈkluβ ðe ˈfuðβol]) is a Spanish professional football club based in Getafe, a city in the Community of Madrid. They compete in La Liga, the top tier of the Spanish football. The team has played its home matches in the 16,500-capacity Estadio Coliseum since 1998.

Founded in 1983, the club was promoted to La Liga for the first time in 2004, and participated in the top level of Spanish football for twelve years between 2004 and 2016, and again since 2017. The club maintain rivalries with neighbours Leganés, who are based near the town of Getafe, Atlético Madrid and Real Madrid.

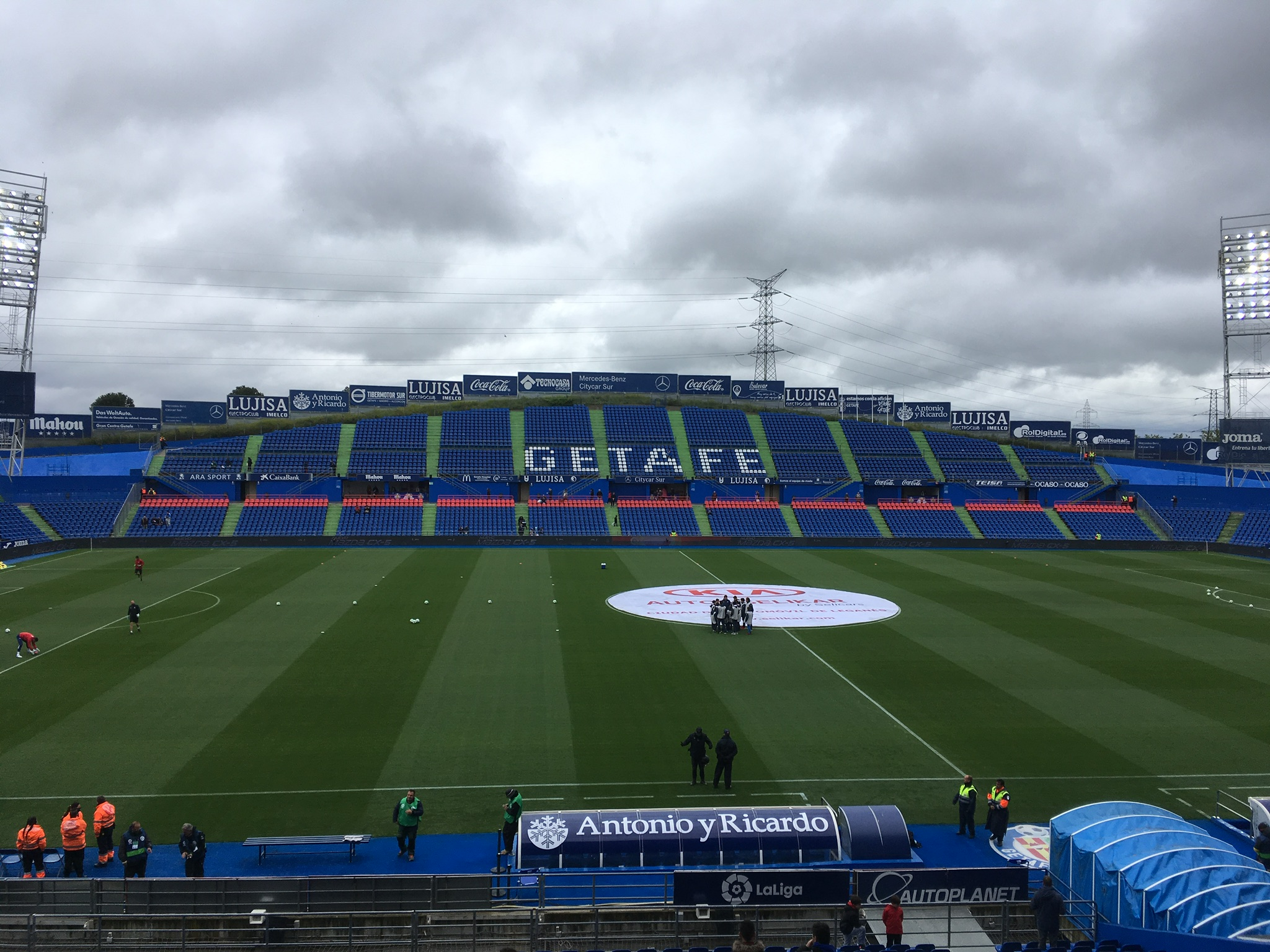
Getafe CF home Stadium Estadio Coliseum.

== History ==
=== Beginning ===
Sociedad Getafe Deportivo was founded in 1923, only playing in lower divisions from 1928 to 1932. After the Spanish Civil War, in 1945 five Getafe locals – Enrique Condes García, Aurelio Miranda Olavaria, Antonio Corredor Lozano, Manuel Serrano Vergara and Miguel Cubero Francés – while meeting at La Marquesina bar, decided to form a local team. Officially founded on 24 February 1946, the club was named Club Getafe Deportivo.

The club originally played in the Campo del Regimiento de Artillería, which lacked goal posts. Shortly after, the club moved to San Isidro, housed in the current Municipal Sports Center of San Isidro. Here, Club Getafe was promoted to the third division following their victory against Villarrobledo in the 1956–57 season. Getafe was nearly promoted to the Segunda División in 1957–58, but was defeated by CA Almería.

On 2 September 1970, the club inaugurated its own stadium after being promoted back to the Tercera División. Presided by chairman Francisco Vara, Las Margaritas won a 3–1 victory over Michelín. The team survived in the third level that season, and six years later gained their first promotion to the second division.

=== Second division ===
Club Getafe Deportivo played six seasons in the Segunda División, with little success. From 1976 to 1982, they placed below tenth level all six years.

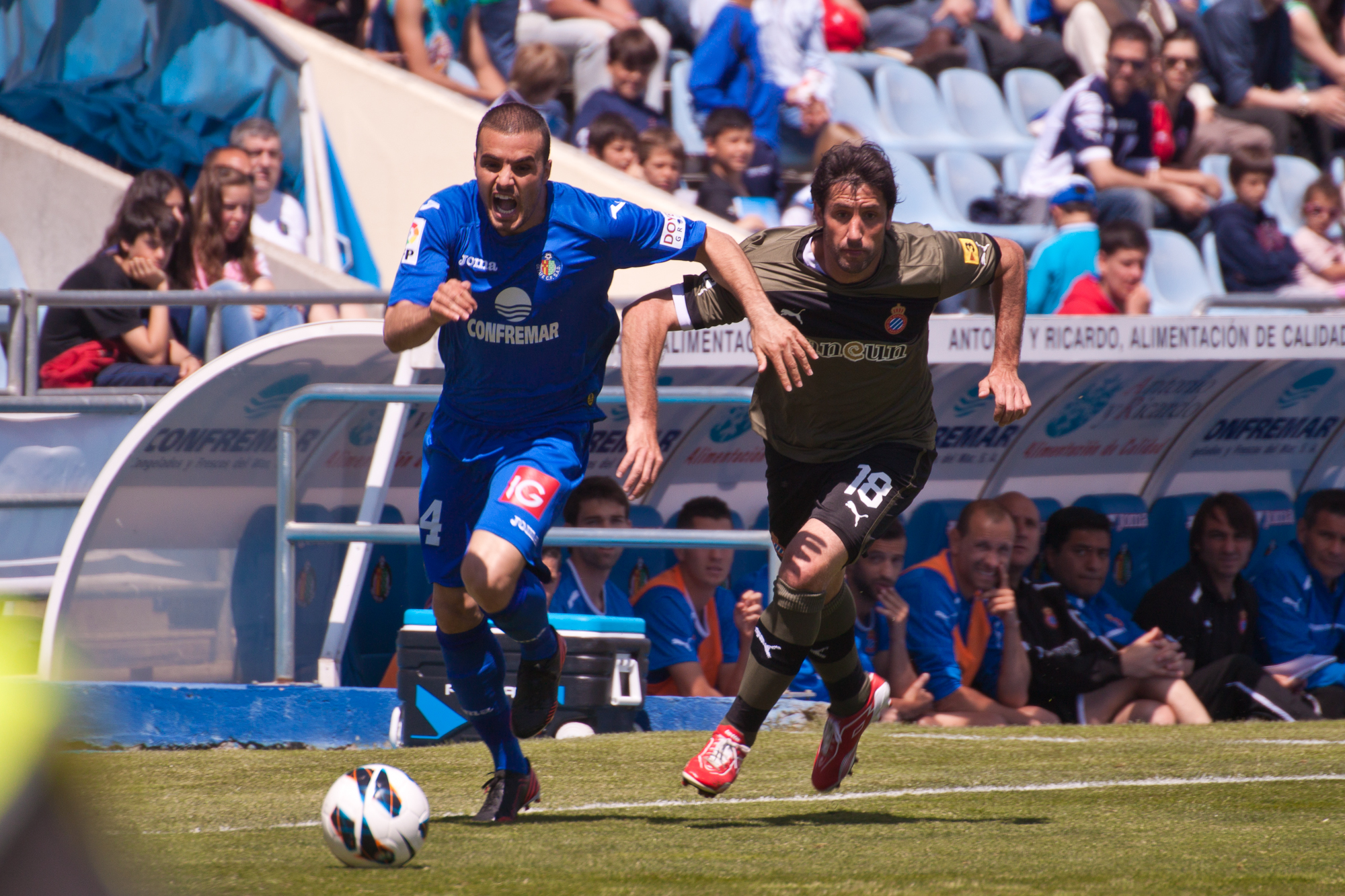
Pedro León with Getafe in 2013

In 1978, the club advanced to play against Barcelona in the Copa del Rey round of 16. Playing at home in the first leg, Getafe drew with a star-studded Barcelona team 3–3, before traveling away for the second leg and being thrashed 8–0 at the Camp Nou.

At the conclusion of the 1981–82 season, players having not been paid, Getafe was automatically relegated and subsequently liquidated.

Meanwhile, on 1 September 1976, a new club was founded in the National Sports Council and the Regional Federation of Castille. The club was called Peña Madridista Getafe (the "Real Madrid supporters' club of Getafe"). This club played for four seasons in various divisions, until taking the name Club Deportivo Peña Getafe, and played under this name for a further two seasons. On 10 July 1982, they joined forces with the much older Club Getafe Promesas, and were registered again in the Regional Federation of Castille.

=== Present existence ===
Based on the merger the previous year, the present Getafe Club de Fútbol was officially founded on 8 July 1983, after passing through assembly.

Starting in the regional leagues in 1983–84, Getafe was promoted for four consecutive seasons until reaching the Segunda División B. The club started a new period with its promotion into Segunda in 1994–95, staying only two years. Threatening absolute disappearance just a few years later in 1997, Getafe survived relegation into the fourth level Tercera División following a two-legged playoff victory over Huesca.

Meanwhile, Getafe's current stadium, the Coliseum Alfonso Pérez, was inaugurated on 1 January 1998.

Returning to the second division for 1999–2000, Getafe lasted another two seasons. However, one year later, they would return following an amazing promotion in 2001–02 during which one of their players, Sebastián "Sebas" Gómez, was murdered, and controversy regarding unpaid payments of players following a debt of €3 million.

Consolidating their position after one year, Getafe had a good season in Segunda. At the top of the table for most of the year, the side travelled to the Canary Islands on the final matchday needing a win to assure a historic promotion to La Liga, the top-flight. They defeated Tenerife 5–3 with five goals from Sergio Pachón, thus becoming along with Real Madrid, Atlético Madrid and Rayo Vallecano the fourth team from the Community of Madrid – and the first of them from outside of the capital – to ever play in La Liga. With this promotion, Getafe had ascended the whole Spanish football pyramid, achieving this feat in 20 years.

=== La Liga ===
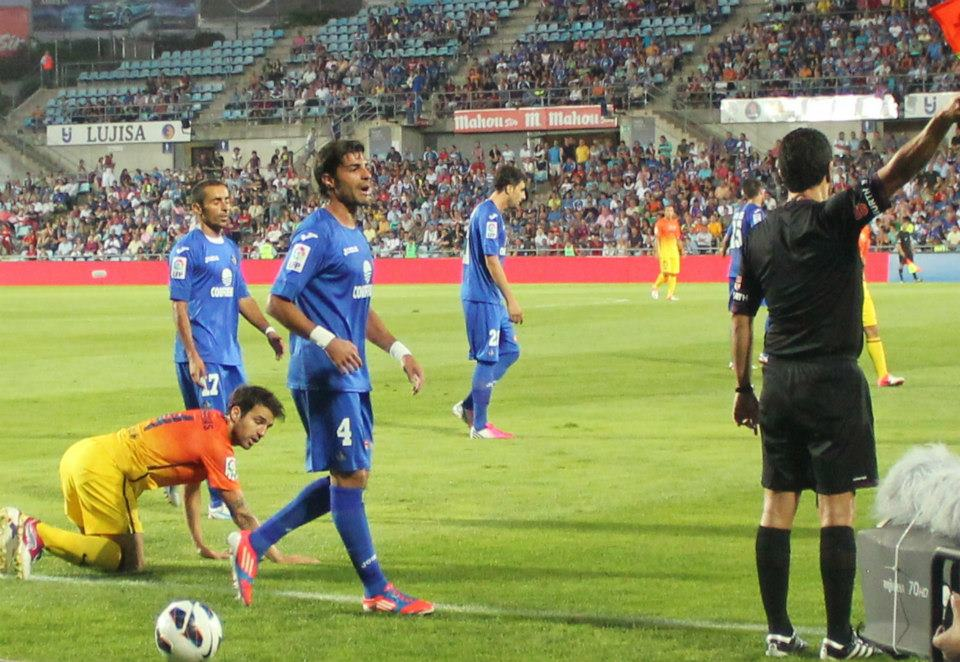
Getafe Club de Fútbol vs. FC Barcelona.

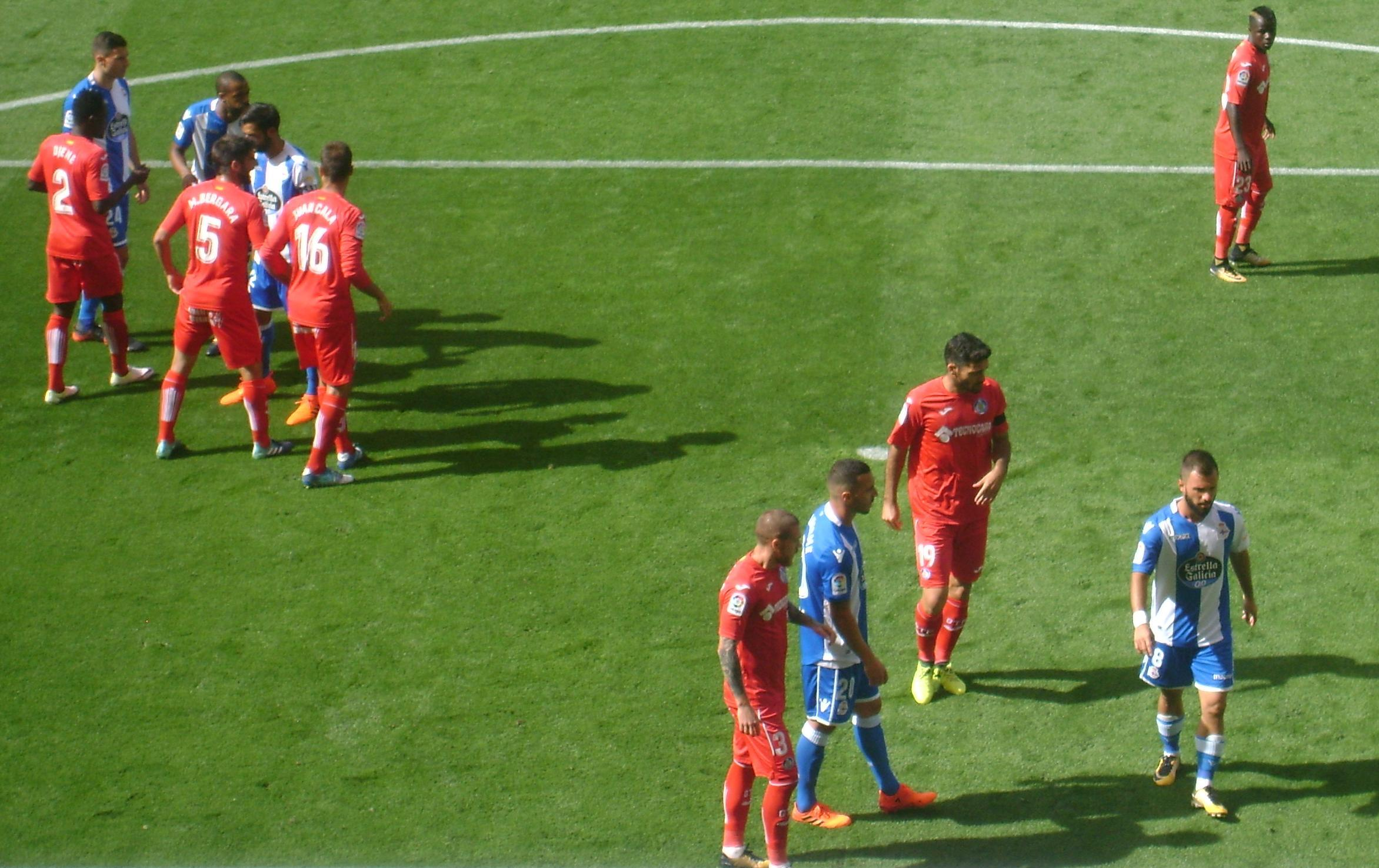
Deportivo de La Coruña vs. Getafe CF.

The club started 2004–05 poorly, lying at the bottom of the table. Home wins over Espanyol, Athletic Bilbao, Valencia and Real Madrid, followed by a sole away win of the season over Athletic Bilbao, saw Getafe climb to finish 13th, being the only promoted side to avoid relegation. At the end of the season, the club lost head coach Quique Sánchez Flores and several players to rival clubs. In Getafe's next season, the club briefly topped the table before slipping to finish ninth. During the 2006 FIFA World Cup, Argentine-born Mariano Pernía became Getafe's first Spanish international, before moving to Atlético Madrid.

In 2006–07, Getafe again finished ninth in the league, conceding only 33 goals in 38 matches and goalkeeper Roberto Abbondanzieri was awarded the Zamora Trophy, having recorded 12 clean sheets. The highlight of the club's season was reaching the 2006–07 Copa del Rey final, a competition in which Getafe had never reached the quarter-finals before. The run included a two-legged semi-final against Barcelona in which Getafe lost the first leg 5–2 at the Camp Nou before producing a 4–0 rout in the second leg at the Coliseum Alfonso Pérez. Getafe lost their first major final 1–0 to Sevilla at the Santiago Bernabéu Stadium. Through this, the club qualified for the following season's UEFA Cup qualification, as Sevilla had already qualified for the UEFA Champions League through their league position.

Chart of Getafe CF league performance 1929–present

The following season, coach Bernd Schuster left after two seasons to become head coach at Real Madrid, and Getafe appointed Michael Laudrup as his replacement. Under Laudrup, Getafe again finished the league mid-table. In the UEFA Cup, the team managed to progress to the quarter-finals after finishing top of Group G, only losing once, setting up a tie against four-time European Cup winners Bayern Munich. Getafe drew the away leg 1–1, thanks to an injury time equaliser from Cosmin Contra. In the second leg, Rubén de la Red was sent off after six minutes. Contra put Getafe ahead just before half-time, but in the 89th minute, Franck Ribéry equalized to send the match into extra time. Two quick goals from Javier Casquero and substitute Braulio gave Getafe a 3–1 lead, but Bayern pulled a goal back from Luca Toni, before Toni again scored seconds before the end of extra time, giving Bayern an away goals win. Getafe also had successful run in the Copa del Rey, reaching the final for a second year running. In the final, at the Vicente Calderón Stadium, Getafe were beaten 3–1 by Valencia.

In the 2015–16 season, Getafe were relegated to second division after spending 12 years in first campaign. However, in 2016–17, the club immediately returned to La Liga after defeating Huesca and Tenerife to gain promotion via the play-offs. In the 2017–18 season Getafe finished in the 8th position, easily avoiding the relegation back to Segunda División.

=== 2019–present ===
In the 2018–19 season Getafe finished 5th, their highest finish in the first division, and qualified for the 2019–20 UEFA Europa League group stage. They finished 2nd in their group, with 12 points from 6 games, which allowed them to advance to the next round. They managed to beat Ajax 3–2 on aggregate in the Round of 32. Due to that win, they faced Inter Milan in the round of 16, where their European dream ended with a 2–0 loss.

At the end of the 25/26 season Getafe finished 7th and qualified for the UEFA Conference League despite only scoring 32 goals in 38 league games (only 20th place Real Oviedo scored less that season).

== Stadium ==
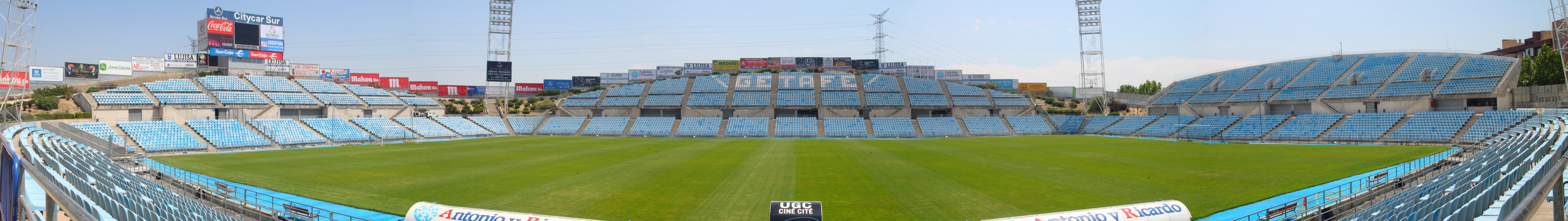
Coliseum Alfonso Pérez

Getafe play at the Estadio Coliseum, located in Getafe. Its pitch dimensions are 105x70 metres. The stadium was inaugurated on 1 January 1998, named after the Spanish international (and of Real Madrid fame) Alfonso Pérez. Though he never played for or against Getafe, or even in the stadium, he is perhaps the most famous footballer to come out of the area and was at the height of his career during the mid-1990s.

Before playing in the Coliseum, Getafe played their home matches at the nearby Estadio de las Margaritas, part of the greater Sports City of Las Margaritas. The Coliseum was subsequently built as a natural extension to the much smaller facilities at Las Margaritas. Since its foundation, the stadium has had numerous renovations, and now seats 14,400 people and several thousand more standing. As such, the exact capacity is variable and ambiguous. Getafe generally fill the stadium for local matches against Real and Atlético Madrid, as well as against Barcelona, most famously in the 2006–07 Cup semi-final. For the first time in their history, Getafe pre-sold out the whole of the Coliseum before their second leg match against Bayern Munich in the UEFA Cup quarter-final.

Getafe club president Ángel Torres expressed interest in upgrading the Coliseum to a much greater 20,000-seat arena, in conjunction with Madrid's bid for the 2012 Olympic Games. The failure of this bid and poor crowd averages put this redevelopment in doubt.

Getafe use the nearby Sports City when training. These facilities include several training pitches with both grass and artificial turf, full medical rooms and recuperation facilities.

== Supporters ==
Commonly called Marea Azul, or Azulones, Getafe supporters have steadily increased in number with the success of the team in recent years. There are 18 peñas ("supporter clubs") and 12,000 socios ("associates"). Former Real Madrid player Francisco Pavón is a well-known Getafe socio, while Fernando Alonso and Rafael Nadal have attended matches at the Coliseum in the past.

Getafe supporters have grown far beyond the local area and are now known to have fans in Australia, Sweden, Finland, Czech Republic, Argentina, Scotland, Denmark, the United States and Mexico. In 2007, a peña was founded in Venezuela to extend the worldwide club reach.

Getafe also created some controversy in 2007 when their season ticket campaign included biblical references of Abraham, Moses and Jesus sacrificing themselves for the team. The club responded by withdrawing the first scene involving Abraham.

Upon important or famous victories, Getafe fans congregate to celebrate at the Cibelina statue in the town centre. Prior to the 2007 Cup final, Torres implored the fans to "tear down the Cibelina" upon victory, promising to pay for a new design. During that final, thousands of supporters rushed to get tickets and packed into the Santiago Bernabéu, yet were vastly outnumbered by Sevillistas. However, those who failed to get tickets – most of which went to season ticket holders for the 2007–08 campaign – were able to watch the match on a big screen in Getafe's central square.

Getafe has also a small group of Ultras supporters, called Comandos Azules ("blue commandos").

=== Zombies Calientes de Getafe ===
In 2011, Getafe released a humorous tongue-in-cheek advertising campaign, pretending to decry the club's relatively small fanbase and encouraging male supporters to donate sperm in order to breed more fans. To inspire those donations, the club produced a short pornographic film called Zombies Calientes de Getafe ("Horny Zombies of Getafe"), "shot in the style of a 1970s porn film", and delivered it to sperm donation clinics in Madrid.

== Rivalries ==
Historically, due to their close geographical position, Getafe has always held a strong rivalry with Leganés. They played out numerous encounters in the lower division before the two teams fortunes began to contrast as Getafe gained ascendency and Leganés began to deteriorate. The derby is known as the "South Madrid Derby."

The club also has rivalries against Real Madrid, Atlético de Madrid and Rayo Vallecano, once again due to their geographical position in Madrid. Against Real Madrid, Getafe have lost their last four La Liga games.

In addition to this, Getafe has developed somewhat of a rivalry with Barcelona, which culminated in their famous 4–0 victory over their more fancied opponents during the 2006–07 Copa del Rey semi-final. Also, Valencia has succumbed numerous times to el Geta, often quite heavily, as was the case during the 2006–07 Copa del Rey, which ensured Getafe's first appearance in the Copa's quarter-finals with a 2–4 win at Valencia's Mestalla Stadium. However, this result was turned around in the 2008 Copa del Rey final, as Valencia would deny Getafe their first trophy with a 3–1 victory. This rivalry is propped up healthily by the regular transfer of Getafe players (and head coach Quique Sánchez Flores) to Valencia.

== European record ==
The club has not appeared in any European competition except for the UEFA Europa League (formerly the UEFA Cup) and the UEFA Conference League.

The club appeared only three times in the UEFA Cup/Europa League. In 2007–08, they qualified for the tournament as Copa del Rey runners-up in the previous season to Sevilla (who had already qualified for the UEFA Champions League), and progressed from the first round, group stage, round of 32 and round of 16, before being beaten by Bayern Munich in the quarter-finals. Three years later in 2010–11, they were paired with APOEL in the play-off round, and advanced after eliminating them, but were then eliminated in the group stage after finishing in third place. In the 2019–20 season, Getafe appeared in the tournament for the third time, and were able to qualify from the group stage in second place, before progressing past the round of 32 after eliminating Ajax. However, they would be eliminated in the next round against Inter Milan, played as a single fixture due to the COVID-19 pandemic.

Season	Competition	Round	Opponent	Home	Away	Aggregate
2007–08	UEFA Cup	1R	(Netherlands) Twente	1–0	2–3 (a.e.t.)	3–3 (a)
2007–08	UEFA Cup	Group G	(England) Tottenham Hotspur	—N/a	2–1	1st
2007–08	UEFA Cup	Group G	(Israel) Hapoel Tel Aviv	1–2	—N/a	1st
2007–08	UEFA Cup	Group G	(Denmark) Aalborg BK	—N/a	2–1	1st
2007–08	UEFA Cup	Group G	(Belgium) Anderlecht	2–1	—N/a	1st
2007–08	UEFA Cup	R32	(Greece) AEK Athens	3–0	1–1	4–1
2007–08	UEFA Cup	R16	(Portugal) Benfica	1–0	2–1	3–1
2007–08	UEFA Cup	QF	(Germany) Bayern Munich	3–3 (a.e.t.)	1–1	4–4 (a)
2010–11	UEFA Europa League	PO	(Cyprus) APOEL	1–0	1–1 (a.e.t.)	2–1
2010–11	UEFA Europa League	Group H	(Denmark) Odense	2–1	1–1	3rd
2010–11	UEFA Europa League	Group H	(Switzerland) Young Boys	1–0	0–2	3rd
2010–11	UEFA Europa League	Group H	(Germany) VfB Stuttgart	0–3	0–1	3rd
2019–20	UEFA Europa League	Group C	(Switzerland) Basel	0–1	1–2	2nd
2019–20	UEFA Europa League	Group C	(Russia) Krasnodar	3–0	2–1	2nd
2019–20	UEFA Europa League	Group C	(Turkey) Trabzonspor	1–0	1–0	2nd
2019–20	UEFA Europa League	R32	(Netherlands) Ajax	2–0	1–2	3–2
2019–20	UEFA Europa League	R16	(Italy) Inter Milan	0–2		
2026–27	UEFA Conference League	PO	(Serbia) Partizan	3–1	1–2	4–3
2026–27	UEFA Conference League	League phase	(Romania) Universitatea Craiova	—N/a		
2026–27	UEFA Conference League	League phase	(Switzerland) Lugano		—N/a	
2026–27	UEFA Conference League	League phase	(England) Brighton & Hove Albion		—N/a	
2026–27	UEFA Conference League	League phase	(Georgia (country)) Iberia 1999	—N/a		
2026–27	UEFA Conference League	League phase	(Andorra) Inter Club d'Escaldes		—N/a	
2026–27	UEFA Conference League	League phase	(Netherlands) Ajax	—N/a		

== Season to season ==
Season	Tier	Division	Place	Copa del Rey
1983–84	7	2ª Reg.	1st	
1984–85	6	1ª Reg.	1st	
1985–86	5	Reg. Pref.	1st	
1986–87	4	3ª	6th	
1987–88	3	2ª B	3rd	Fourth round
1988–89	3	2ª B	6th	First round
1989–90	3	2ª B	2nd	
1990–91	3	2ª B	4th	Fourth round
1991–92	3	2ª B	6th	Fifth round
1992–93	3	2ª B	4th	Third round
1993–94	3	2ª B	2nd	Fourth round
1994–95	2	2ª	18th	Third round
1995–96	2	2ª	19th	Second round
1996–97	3	2ª B	16th	First round
1997–98	3	2ª B	7th	
1998–99	3	2ª B	1st	
1999–2000	2	2ª	19th	First round
2000–01	2	2ª	21st	Round of 64
2001–02	3	2ª B	5th	Round of 64
2002–03	2	2ª	11th	Round of 32

Season	Tier	Division	Place	Copa del Rey
2003–04	2	2ª	2nd	Round of 64
2004–05	1	1ª	13th	Round of 16
2005–06	1	1ª	9th	Round of 16
2006–07	1	1ª	9th	Runner-up
2007–08	1	1ª	14th	Runner-up
2008–09	1	1ª	17th	Round of 32
2009–10	1	1ª	6th	Semi-finalist
2010–11	1	1ª	16th	Round of 16
2011–12	1	1ª	11th	Round of 32
2012–13	1	1ª	10th	Round of 16
2013–14	1	1ª	13th	Round of 16
2014–15	1	1ª	15th	Quarter-finals
2015–16	1	1ª	19th	Round of 32
2016–17	2	2ª	3rd	Second round
2017–18	1	1ª	8th	Round of 32
2018–19	1	1ª	5th	Quarter-finals
2019–20	1	1ª	8th	Second round
2020–21	1	1ª	15th	Second round
2021–22	1	1ª	15th	Second round
2022–23	1	1ª	15th	Round of 32

Season	Tier	Division	Place	Copa del Rey
2023–24	1	1ª	12th	Round of 16
2024–25	1	1ª	13th	Quarter-finals
2025–26	1	1ª	7th	Round of 32
2026–27	1	1ª		TBD

- 22 seasons in La Liga
- 7 seasons in Segunda División
- 11 seasons in Segunda División B
- 1 seasons in Tercera División
- 3 seasons in Categorías Regionales

== Honours ==
- Segunda Regional
  - Winners (1): 1983-84
- Primera Regional
  - Winners (1): 1984-85
- Regional Preferente
  - Winners (1): 1985-86
- Segunda División B
  - Winners (1): 1998–99

== Players ==
=== Current squad ===
As of 13 October 2026

Note: Flags indicate national team as defined under FIFA eligibility rules; some limited exceptions apply. Players may hold more than one non-FIFA nationality.

No.	Pos.	Nation	Player
1	GK	CZE	Jiří Letáček
2	DF	TOG	Dakonam Djené (captain)
3	DF	ESP	Davinchi
4	DF	GEO	Saba Sazonov
5	DF	MAR	Abdel Abqar
6	MF	ESP	Mario Martín
7	FW	ESP	Juanmi
8	MF	SRB	Nemanja Gudelj
9	FW	ESP	Borja Mayoral
10	FW	URU	Martín Satriano
11	MF	ESP	Ramon Terrats
13	GK	ESP	David Soria (vice-captain)

No.	Pos.	Nation	Player
14	DF	ESP	Dani Carvajal
15	DF	URU	Sebastián Boselli
16	MF	ESP	Francho Serrano
17	DF	ESP	Kiko Femenía
18	MF	NGR	Christantus Uche
19	FW	TUR	Enes Ünal
20	FW	ESP	Iván Azón (on loan from Como)
21	DF	ESP	Andrés García (on loan from Aston Villa)
22	DF	COL	Johan Mojica
23	MF	BEL	Orel Mangala (on loan from Lyon)
24	DF	ARG	Zaid Romero
26	DF	CIV	Jean Ives Valou (on loan from Villarreal)

=== Reserve team ===
Note: Flags indicate national team as defined under FIFA eligibility rules; some limited exceptions apply. Players may hold more than one non-FIFA nationality.

No.	Pos.	Nation	Player
27	FW	GAM	Ebrahima Drammeh
28	MF	ESP	Alberto Risco
29	DF	ESP	Curro Burgos
30	MF	BOL	Óscar López
31	DF	MAR	Moha Hamdoune
32	FW	ESP	Joselu Pérez

No.	Pos.	Nation	Player
33	FW	MAR	Moha Achraf
34	MF	ESP	Jesús Martínez
35	GK	ESP	Diego Ferrer
36	FW	SEN	Ibrahima Danfakha
37	FW	ESP	Sebas Salazar
38	DF	UKR	Vladyslav Kysil

=== Out on loan ===
Note: Flags indicate national team as defined under FIFA eligibility rules; some limited exceptions apply. Players may hold more than one non-FIFA nationality.

No.	Pos.	Nation	Player
—	DF	ESP	Gorka Rivera (at Unionistas until 30 June 2027)
—	MF	CMR	Yvan Neyou (at Volos until 30 June 2027)

No.	Pos.	Nation	Player
—	FW	ESP	Álex Sancris (at Leganés until 30 June 2027)
—	FW	MAR	Yassin Tallal (at Real Unión until 30 June 2027)

== Club officials ==
=== Current technical staff ===
Position	Staff
Head coach	(Spain) José Bordalás
Assistant coach	(Spain) Patri (Spain) José Vegar
Technical assistant	(Spain) Darío Montero
Fitness coach	(Spain) Javier Vidal (Spain) Diego Megías
Goalkeeper coach	(Spain) Curro Galán
Team manager	(Spain) Mejuto González
Equipment manager	(Spain) Javier Martín (Romania) Costel Borta (Spain) Christian (Spain) Peñi
Doctor	(Spain) Joaquín Peiró (Spain) Ana de la Torre (Spain) Christopher Oyola (Spain) Blanca Rodríguez
Physiotherapists	(Spain) Diego Saz (Spain) Luis Peñalver (Spain) Fermín Valera (Spain) Álvaro García (Spain) Daniel Guzmán (Spain) José Ramos (Spain) Quique Pascual
Rehab fitness coach	(Spain) Juan Antonio Hernández (Spain) Xabier Laucirica
Chiropodist	(Spain) Francisco Escobar
Nutritionist	(Venezuela) Katherine De Sousa (Spain) Sergio Ibiricu

Last updated: 17 August 2025
Source: Getafe CF

=== Board of directors ===
Office	Name
President	(Spain) Ángel Torres
First vice president	(Spain) Felipe Triguero
Second vice president	(Spain) Valentín Sánchez Girón
Treasurer	(Spain) María Ángeles Carlos Vara (Spain) Patricia Torres
Member	(Spain) Damián Jiménez Fraile
Secretary of the board of directors (not a board member)	(Spain) Juan Leif Pérez Preus
General director	(Spain) Antonio Sánchez Mora
Sporting director	(Spain) Toni Muñoz
Technical secretary	(Spain) Gonzalo Fernández
Head of lower categories	(Spain) Manuel Alcázar
Coordinator of lower categories	(Spain) Ricardo Caballero
Head of academy	(Spain) Sergio Pachón
Academy football coordinator	(Spain) Eugenio Mancha
Administration and operations director	(Spain) José Antonio Ramírez
Financial director	(Spain) María Ángeles Carlos
Medical services	(Spain) Dr. Cristopher Oyola (Spain) Dr. Ana de la Torre
Physiotherapist	(Spain) Álvaro García
Director of communication and digital strategy	(Spain) Marco Rocha
Digital and technology management	(Spain) David Torres
Marketing director	(Spain) Alberto Heras
Director of protocol	(Spain) Nerea Alonso
Compliance officer	(Spain) Juan Leif Pérez Preus

Last updated: 9 April 2019
Source: Getafe CF

== Coaches ==
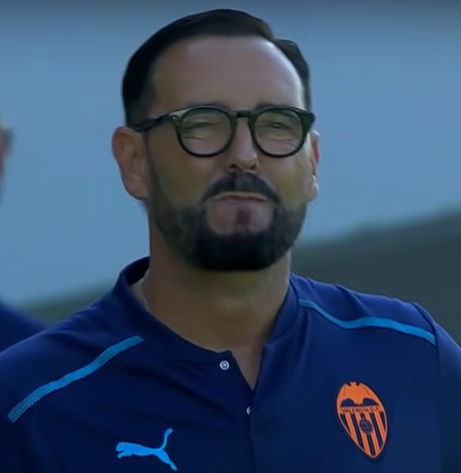
José Bordalás

- (Spain) Luis Sánchez Duque (1994–95)
- (Spain) Emilio Cruz (1995)
- (Spain) Luis Ángel Duque (1996)
- (Spain) Manuel García Calderón (1997–98)
- (Spain) Santiago Prado (1998–2000)
- (Spain) Juanjo (2000)
- (Spain) Manolo Cano (2000)
- (Spain) Gonzalo Hurtado (2001)
- (Spain) Felines (2001–03)
- (Spain) Pepe Mel (2003)
- (Spain) Josu Uribe (2003–04)
- (Spain) Quique Sánchez Flores (2004–05)
- (Germany) Bernd Schuster (2005–07)
- (Denmark) Michael Laudrup (2007–08)
- (Spain) Víctor Muñoz (2008–09)
- (Spain) Míchel (2009–11)
- (Spain) Luis García (2011–14)
- (Romania) Cosmin Contra (2014–15)
- (Spain) Quique Sánchez Flores (2015)
- (Spain) Pablo Franco (2015)
- (Spain) Fran Escribá (2015–16)
- (Argentina) Juan Esnáider (2016)
- (Spain) José Bordalás (2016–21)
- (Spain) Míchel (2021)
- (Spain) Quique Sánchez Flores (2021–2023)
- (Spain) José Bordalás (2023–)

== Presidents ==
- Antonio de Miguel (1983–92)
- Francisco Flores (1992–2000)
- Felipe González (2000–01)
- Domingo Rebosio (2001–02)
- Ángel Torres (2002–)

== See also ==
- Getafe CF B
- Getafe Deportivo
