= 2018–19 FC Barcelona season =

120th season of FC Barcelona

Barcelona
2018–19 season
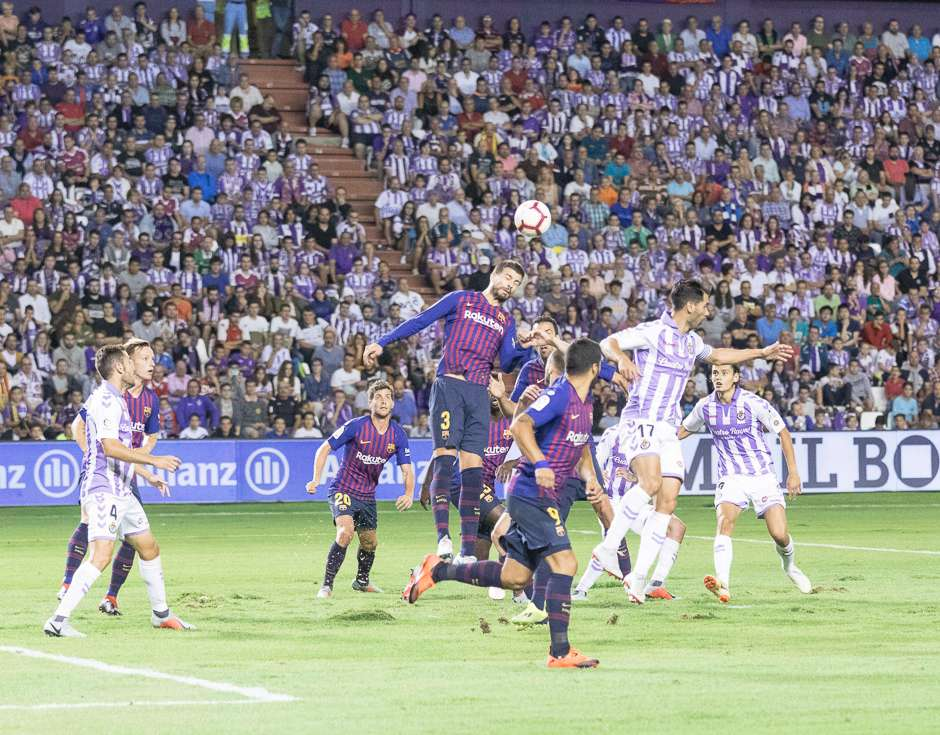
- Barcelona players in action against Real Valladolid CF in August 2018
- President: Josep Maria Bartomeu
- Head Coach: Ernesto Valverde
- Stadium: Camp Nou
- La Liga: 1st
- Copa del Rey: Runners-up
- Supercopa de España: Winners
- UEFA Champions League: Semi-finals
- Top goalscorer: League: Lionel Messi (36); All: Lionel Messi (51)
- Highest home attendance: 98,299 vs Liverpool (1 May 2019)
- Lowest home attendance: 42,838 vs Levante (17 January 2019)
- Average home league attendance: 76,104
Home colours	Away colours	Third colours

The 2018–19 season was Futbol Club Barcelona's 120th season in existence and the club's 88th consecutive season in the top flight of Spanish football. Barcelona was involved in four competitions after winning the double of La Liga and the Copa del Rey in the previous season.

Contrary to the expectations and primarily due to stellar Lionel Messi performances, Barcelona were in the running for a third continental treble, until 7 May 2019, when they infamously lost 4–0 to eventual winners Liverpool in the second leg of the Champions League semi-finals, having been up 3–0 after the first game. The league title was secured earlier on 27 April and Barça advanced to its sixth consecutive Copa del Rey final on 27 February. The loss at Anfield derailed the team and they went on to lose the Copa del Rey final as well, to Valencia. Barça's league title was its eighth in eleven seasons; their next league title would be won in 2022–23. Head coach Ernesto Valverde was sacked midway through the next season.

The season was the first since 2001–02 season without former captain Andrés Iniesta, who departed to join Vissel Kobe.

== Season overview ==
=== June ===
On 3 June, Barcelona and defender Samuel Umtiti reached an agreement to extend the player's contract for a further five seasons through to 2022–23 with a release clause of €500 million.

On 11 June, Barcelona reached an agreement with Watford for the transfer of Gerard Deulofeu for €13 million plus €4 million in variables. Barcelona will also receive a percentage of any future transfer fee.

=== July ===
On 8 July, Barcelona announced that they had reached an agreement with Guangzhou Evergrande for the loan transfer of Paulinho for one season, with a subsequent purchase option for the Chinese club.

On 9 July, Barcelona and Grêmio finalized the transfer of Arthur following the agreement the two clubs reached in March for a transfer fee of €31 million plus €9 million in variables. The player will sign a contract for the next six seasons and the buyout clause is set at €400 million.

On 12 July, Barcelona announced that they had paid the buyout clause for Clément Lenglet which stood at €35.9 million. The player, who joined from Sevilla, signed a contract with the club for the next five seasons and the buyout clause is set at €300 million.

On 23 July, Barcelona announced that they had reached an agreement with Sivasspor for the loan transfer of Douglas for one season.

On 23 July, Barcelona announced that they had reached an agreement with Deportivo La Coruña for the loan transfer of Adrián Ortolá for one season, with a subsequent purchase option for the A Coruña club.

On 24 July, Barcelona announced that they had reached an agreement with Bordeaux for the transfer of Malcom for a transfer fee of €41 million plus €1 million in variables. The player signed a contract for the next five seasons until the end of 2022–23.

=== August ===
On 1 August, Barcelona and Everton reached an agreement for the transfer of Lucas Digne to the English club for an initial fee of €20.2 million and €1.5 million in variables.

On 3 August, Barcelona announced that they had reached an agreement with Bayern Munich for the transfer of Arturo Vidal to the Catalan club for the next three seasons for a fee of €18 million.

On 4 August, Barcelona and Sevilla reached an agreement for the transfer of Aleix Vidal to the Andalusian club for a transfer fee of €8.5 million, plus €2 million in variables.

On 9 August, Barcelona and Everton reached an agreement for the transfer of Yerry Mina for a fee of €30.25 million with an additional €1.5 million in variables. Barcelona also negotiated a buy-back clause in the transfer. Additionally, André Gomes was loaned to Everton for the 2018–19 season. The English club agreed to pay a fee of €2.25 million for the single season.

On 12 August, Barcelona defeated Sevilla 1–2 in the Spanish Super Cup at the Stade Ibn Batouta in Morocco; goals from Gerard Piqué and Ousmane Dembélé handed the Catalans their 13th Supercopa de España title. The trophy was the first won under the captaincy of Lionel Messi, who also claimed his record-breaking 33rd trophy with the club. Additionally, the match saw official debuts from Arthur, Lenglet, and Arturo Vidal.

On 16 August, Barcelona announced that they had reached an agreement for the transfer of Marlon to the Italian club Sassuolo for an initial fee of €6 million, including a buy-back clause for the Catalans. Barcelona will receive additional €6 million if Marlon makes 50 appearances for Sassuolo. If he would be sold before that, Barcelona will receive 50% of the future transfer fee.

On 18 August, Barcelona defeated Alavés 3–0 with two goals from Messi, including the 6,000th La Liga goal in the club's history, and one from Coutinho to secure Barça an opening day victory for a tenth successive season.

On 25 August, Barcelona defeated Real Valladolid 0–1, Barça made it two wins out of two thanks to a goal from Dembélé. The match also saw an official debut from Malcom.

=== September ===
On 2 September, Barcelona demolished newly promoted Huesca 8–2. A sensational Messi who scored 2 goals had the chance to get his hat-trick with a final minute penalty, but chose to be generous and gave the chance to Suárez who scored his 2nd goal of the game. Dembélé, Ivan Rakitić, Jordi Alba were also on the scoresheet, along with an own goal from Jorge Pulido.

On 15 September, Barcelona defeated Real Sociedad 1–2. Despite trailing at half time, goals from Suárez and Dembélé turned things around to make it four wins out of four in La Liga.

On 18 September, Barcelona beat PSV Eindhoven 4–0 in their first Champions League game of the season. Another great performance of Messi as he managed his record-breaking 8th Champions League hat-trick and Dembélé notched the remaining goal from a solo effort to complete another victory for the Blaugrana side.

On 23 September, Barcelona draw Girona 2–2. Sending off for Lenglet hinders home side, Messi and Piqué found the net for the Blaugrana.

On 26 September, Barcelona lost to Leganés 2–1. Coutinho's opener counts for nothing as top against bottom clash took unexpected twist with two goals in a minute.

On 29 September, Barcelona draw Athletic Bilbao 1–1. Substitutes Messi and Munir came to the rescue to salvage a draw at Camp Nou after Basques had taken 41st-minute lead

=== October ===
On 3 October, Barcelona defeated Tottenham 2–4, with some major changes in the starting eleven introducing Arthur as a starter for the first time in midfield, the benching of Dembele and putting Coutinho back in attack with Messi and Suarez. Valverde's men secured an important victory in a classic, end-to-end match in London to maintain their perfect start in the Champions League group stage.

On 7 October, Barcelona drew with Valencia CF 1-1. Messi scored a beautiful equaliser after an early opener from Garay to earn the blaugranes a share of the spoils at Mestalla.

On 20 October, Barcelona defeated Sevilla 4-2. Four goals and a sensational performance by Ter Stegen allowed Barça to snatch first place back from the leaders on a night that Leo Messi went off injured.

On 24 October, Barcelona defeated Inter Milan 2-0. Rafinha and Jordi Alba's superb goals left the Catalans flying high in Champions League Group B with the maximum points at the halfway stage.

On 28 October, in the first El Clásico of the season, and the first since 2007 not to feature Messi or Cristiano Ronaldo, Barcelona thrashed Real Madrid 5–1 at the Camp Nou, with Luis Suárez scoring a hat-trick.

=== November ===
On 3 November, Barca defeated Rayo Vallecano 2-3, two goals from Suárez and another from Ousmane Dembélé earned the Blaugranes a late win at Vallecas.

On 6 November, Barca draw Inter Milan 1-1, Malcom's 1st goal was not enough at the Giuseppe Meazza after the equalizing goal of Icardi, but Barça still made the knockout stages with two games in hand.

On 11 November, Barca lost 3-4 to Betis, The Andalusians spoiled Messi's return to action who scored 2 goals, with a shock victory in a dramatic encounter at the Camp Nou seeing Rakitic being sent off after picking his 2nd yellow card .

On 24 November, Barca draw Atlético Madrid 1-1, Diego Costa's late header at the Wanda Metropolitano was cancelled out by Ousmane Dembélé after a brilliant pass of Messi in the final minute of normal time.in addition both Sergi Roberto and rafinha got injured after the game against Atlético

On 28 November, Barca defeated PSV Eindhoven 1-2, Goals from a sensational Messi and Piqué clinched the points that ensure top spot in Champions League Group B with a game in hand.

=== December ===
On 2 December, Barcelona defeated Villarreal 2-0 with goals from Gerard Piqué and Carles Aleñá, which ensured the win and a clean sheet against worthy opponents.

On 8 December, Barcelona defeated Espanyol 0-4 with two sensational free kicks from Leo Messi, plus goals from Dembélé and Luis Suárez which brought derby delight and another week at the top of the table.

On 11 December, Barcelona drew 1-1 with Tottenham producing a magnificent performance as Dembélé scored Barça's only goal.

On 16 December, Barcelona defeated Levante 0-5 playing sensational football which saw them power their way to victory in Valencia. Leo Messi scored yet another hat-trick with Luis Suárez and Gerard Piqué scoring the other goals.

On 20 December, Barcelona announced that they had reached an agreement with Valencia for the transfer of Jeison Murillo on loan for the remainder of the 2018/19 season. The agreement includes a purchase option worth €25m.

On 22 December, Barcelona defeated Celta Vigo 2-0 with goals from Leo Messi and Ousmane Dembele. The win ensured Barca remained on top of the table, three points ahead of Atletico Madrid, heading into the winter break.

=== January ===
On 6 January, Barcelona defeated Getafe 1-2, goals from a sensational Leo Messi and a volley from Luis Suárez overcame a tough opponent and put the Barcelona five points clear at the top of the Liga table.

On 10 January, Barcelona lost to Levante 2-1 in Copa del Rey round of 16, Philippe Coutinho converted a penalty five minutes from the end.

On 13 January, Barcelona defeated Eibar 3-0, by 2 goals of Luis Suarez who was on fire with the first goal coming from a brilliant combination with a reborn Philipe Coutinho, the other goal being scored by none other than a sensational Leo Messi, which made it his record 400th La Liga goal.

On 17 January, Barcelona defeated Levante 3-0 in Copa del Rey round of 16 return game, by 2 goals of Ousmane Dembele and a goal of Leo Messi, this win made sure Barcelona qualified for the Copa del Rey quarter finals.

On 20 January, Barcelona defeated Leganés 3-1, as the first-place Catalans chew up the 'Cucumber Growers' at Camp Nou.

On 23 January, Barcelona lost to Sevilla 2-0 in the Copa del Rey quarterfinals. Juan Sarabia and Ben Yedder scored the goals for Sevilla.

On 23 January, Barcelona announced that they had reached an agreement with Ajax for the transfer of Frankie De Jong who will be joining the Catalan club from 1 July 2019. The transfer fee is 75 million euros, plus a further 11 million in variables. The player will be signing a contract for the next five seasons, through to 2023/24.

On 27 January, Barcelona won Girona 0-2. Nelson Semedo's first League goal and another Leo Messi special handed Barça all three points.

On 30 January, Barcelona won Sevilla 6-1 in the Copa del Rey quarterfinals 2nd leg. Phil Coutinho nets a brace, while Ivan Rakitic, Sergi Roberto, Luis Suárez and Leo Messi notch a goal each. the victory made sure Barcelona qualified for the semifinals of the Copa del Rey

=== February ===
On 1 February, the announcement was made that Barcelona would face Real Madrid in the semifinals of the Copa del Rey, in the second El Clásico of this season.

On 2 February, Barça draw Valencia 2-2, Leo Messi scored twice as first-place Barça battle back from 2-0, first-half deficit to earn a tie and provisionally extend their lead at the top of the table.

On 6 February, Barça draw Real Madrid 1-1, The Catalans and the Madrileños finished all square at Camp Nou in the first leg of the Copa del Rey semifinals; Malcom pulled Barça even after Lucas Vásquez put Los Blancos up early. Making the second leg game at the Bernabeu even more exciting

On 10 February, Barça draw Athletic 0-0, Barça had the possession but without doing too much with it.

On 16 February, Barça won Valladolid 1-0, Barça picked up three vital points in La Liga thanks to a Leo Messi first half penalty. Messi could have doubled the lead with a second penalty given near the end, but the keeper stopped the penalty

On 19 February, Barça draw Lyon 0-0, Barça had 25 shots on goal but no joy with the tie.

On 23 February, Barça won Sevilla 2-4, Lionel Messi's stunning hat-trick against his favourite opponent, and Luis Suarez's late goal secured the points for the Blaugrana who twice went behind.

On 27 February, Barça won Real Madrid 0-3 (1-4 agg), Luis Suárez was the hero as his two goals plus an own goal sent Barça flying into yet another cup final, the 6th Copa Del Rey final in a row for Barca and they were looking to make it their 5th straight victory in a row.

=== March ===
On 2 March, Barça won Real Madrid 0-1, Ivan Rakitic goal secured second win of the week at the Bernabéu. It was four seasons in a row now that Barça have won at Real Madrid in the league, a feat that no other team has ever achieved. FC Barcelona have claimed their 96th win the fixture overtaking Real Madrid for the first time in 87 years.

On 4 March, Barça and Sergi Samper agreed to a contract termination.

On 9 March, Barça won Rayo Vallecano 3-1. Raúl de Tomás scored for the visitors in the 25th minute with an outside of the box shot, Gerard Piqué equalised with a header in the 39th minute, Lionel Messi put Barcelona in the lead with a 51st-minute penalty and Luis Suárez finished off the game with an 82nd minute tap-in.

On 13 March, Barça won Lyon 5-1 (5-1 agg), a magnificent performance from Lionel Messi saw the Argentine grab two of Barça's five goals, and assist in two more for Gerard Piqué and Ousmane Dembélé, Philippe Coutinho completing the scoring. FC Barcelona hold the record in the Champions League for 12 consecutive appearances in the last eight of Europe's top club competition.

On 15 March, it was announced that Barça would face Manchester United in the quarter-finals of the UEFA Champions League.

On 17 March, Barça won Real Betis 1-4. Leo Messi posted yet another legendary hat-trick performance, Luis Suárez added the other, and Barça fly into a ten-point lead in La Liga. Unfortunately the Uruguayan sustained an injury keeping him out of play for 10–15 days.

On the 30th, Barcelona got back to winning ways after the international break, with a 2-0 victory over Espanyol in Derbi barceloní with both goals from Messi.

=== April ===
A thriller of an encounter against Villarreal on 2 April found Barça grab a point in a 4-4 draw after two late goals from Messi and Suárez.

On 6 April, Barça won against Atlético de Madrid at the Camp Nou 2-0, goals scored by Luis Suarez and Lionel Messi, a thriller of a match that saw Spanish centre forward Diego Costa being sent off the field after receiving a red card. With that win, Messi became the player with the most wins in La Liga with 335.

On 10 April, Barça won Manchester United 0-1, that was the first victory at Old Trafford via a Luke Shaw own goal.

On 13 April, Barça drew with Huesca 0-0, a much-changed Barcelona gave first team debuts to Jean-Clair Todibo and Moussa Wague.

On 16 April, Barça won Manchester United 3-0 (4-0 agg). An incredible performance by Messi who scored two first-half goals with Coutinho adding a second-half rocket to qualify Barça for their eighth Champions League semi-final in the last 12 seasons.

On 20 April, Barça won against Real Sociedad 2-1, Lenglet's towering first-half header and Alba's second were enough for Barça to take all three points.

On 23 April, Barça won against Alavés 0-2, Aleñá's opener and Suárez's spot-kick were enough to earn all three points against Alavés.

On 27 April, Barça won against Levante 1-0, Substitute Messi fired in the only goal of the game to secure a 26th Liga title with three games in hand, which made it Barça's 8th La Liga title in 11 years.

=== May ===
On 1 May, Barça won 3–0 against Liverpool in the first leg of the Champions League semi-final. Suarez scored the first goal, followed by two goals by Messi, the third a superb freekick from over 30 yards, providing them with a clear advantage going into the away leg on 7 May at Anfield. Messi's second goal saw him reach 600 goals for Barça in 683 matches. On 4 May, Barça lost 2–0 to Celta Vigo in La Liga, with much of the team rested for the second game with Liverpool.

On 7 May, Barça lost 4–0 against Liverpool via goals from Divock Origi (2) and Georginio Wijnaldum (2), crashing out of the Champions League.

On 19 May, in Barcelona's final La Liga match of the season, Messi scored twice in a 2–2 away draw against Eibar (his 49th and 50th goals of the season in all competitions), which saw him capture his sixth Pichichi Trophy as the league's top scorer, with 36 goals in 34 appearances; with six titles, he equalled Zarra as the player with the most top-scorer awards in La Liga.

On 25 May, Barça lost the Copa Del Rey final to Valencia 1–2. Lionel Messi scored the only Barcelona goal that night. This loss marked the end of the season for FC Barcelona who won two trophies (La liga and Supercopa de España) out of the possible four, despite having been close to winning them all up until 7 May.

== Kit ==
Home	Away	Third	Third alt.	Goalkeeper 1	Goalkeeper 2	Goalkeeper 3

== Squad information ==
=== First team squad ===
N	Pos.	Nat.	Name	Age	EU	Since	App	Goals	Ends	Transfer fee	Notes
1	GK	(Germany)	Marc-André ter Stegen	27	EU	2014	190	0	2022	€12M	
2	DF	(Portugal)	Nélson Semedo	25	EU	2017	82	1	2021	€30M	
3	DF	(Spain)	Gerard Piqué (3rd captain)	32	EU	2008	498	46	2022	€5M	Originally from Youth system
4	MF	(Croatia)	Ivan Rakitić	31	EU	2014	268	35	2021	€18M	
5	MF	(Spain)	Sergio Busquets (vice-captain)	30	EU	2008	536	13	2023	Youth system	
6	DF	(France)	Jean-Clair Todibo	19	EU	2019	2	0	2023	€1M	
7	FW	(Brazil)	Philippe Coutinho	26	EU	2018	75	22	2023	€120M	Second nationality: Portugal
8	MF	(Brazil)	Arthur	22	Non-EU	2018	44	0	2024	€31M	
9	FW	(Uruguay)	Luis Suárez	32	EU	2014	247	177	2021	€81M	Second nationality: Italy
10	FW	(Argentina)	Lionel Messi (captain)	31	EU	2004	687	603	2024	Youth system	Second nationality: Spain
11	FW	(France)	Ousmane Dembélé	22	EU	2017	64	18	2021	€105M	
12	MF	(Brazil)	Rafinha	26	EU	2011	87	12	2020	Youth system	Second nationality: Spain
13	GK	(Netherlands)	Jasper Cillessen	30	EU	2016	32	0	2021	€13M	
14	FW	(Brazil)	Malcom	22	Non-EU	2018	24	4	2023	€41M	
15	DF	(France)	Clément Lenglet	24	EU	2018	45	2	2023	€35.9M	
17	DF	(Colombia)	Jeison Murillo	26	EU	2019	2	0	2019	€2M (loan)	Second nationality: Spain
18	DF	(Spain)	Jordi Alba	30	EU	2012	300	15	2024	€14M	Originally from Youth system
19	FW	(Ghana)	Kevin-Prince Boateng	32	EU	2019	2	0	2019	€1M (loan)	Second nationality: Germany
20	MF	(Spain)	Sergi Roberto (4th captain)	27	EU	2010	245	8	2022	Youth system	
21	MF	(Spain)	Carles Aleñá	21	EU	2016	34	3	2022	Youth system	
22	MF	(Chile)	Arturo Vidal	32	Non-EU	2018	53	3	2021	€18M	
23	DF	(France)	Samuel Umtiti	25	EU	2016	97	2	2023	€25M	
24	DF	(Belgium)	Thomas Vermaelen	33	EU	2014	53	1	2019	€15M	

- Last updated: 4 March 2019
- Source: FCBarcelona.com, Players in / out, Wikipedia players' articles, ESPN (for appearances and goals) and footballdatabase.com (for EU passport)

==== From youth squad ====
Note: Flags indicate national team as defined under FIFA eligibility rules; some limited exceptions apply. Players may hold more than one non-FIFA nationality.

No.	Pos.	Nation	Player
27	DF	ESP	Juan Miranda
28	MF	ESP	Riqui Puig
29	FW	ESP	Abel Ruiz
30	GK	ESP	Iñaki Peña
31	GK	ESP	Jokin Ezkieta
32	MF	ESP	Monchu
33	DF	ESP	Jorge Cuenca

No.	Pos.	Nation	Player
34	MF	ESP	Álex Collado
35	MF	ESP	Oriol Busquets
36	DF	ESP	Chumi
37	DF	ESP	Óscar Mingueza
38	DF	ESP	Guillem Jaime
40	DF	SEN	Moussa Wagué
43	FW	ESP	Carles Pérez

Source: Champions League 2018/19 numbers

== Transfers and loans ==
=== Transfers in ===
Entry date	Position	No.	Player	From club	Fee	Ref.
9 July 2018	MF	8	(Brazil) Arthur	(Brazil) Grêmio	€31,000,000 (Note: Fee may eventually rise to €40,000,000.)	
12 July 2018	DF	15	(France) Clément Lenglet	(Spain) Sevilla	€35,900,000	
24 July 2018	FW	14	(Brazil) Malcom	(France) Bordeaux	€41,000,000 (Note: Fee may eventually rise to €42,000,000.)	
3 August 2018	MF	22	(Chile) Arturo Vidal	(Germany) Bayern Munich	Undisclosed (Note: Fee reported as €18,000,000, and may eventually rise to €21,000,000)	
31 January 2019	DF	6	(France) Jean-Clair Todibo	(France) Toulouse	€1,000,000 (Note: Fee may eventually rise to €3,000,000.)	
Total					€108,900,000	

=== Transfers out ===
Exit date	Position	No.	Player	To club	Fee	Ref.
1 July 2018 (Note: Deal agreed 24 May 2018.)	MF	8	(Spain) Andrés Iniesta	(Japan) Vissel Kobe	Free	
1 July 2018 (Note: Deal agreed 11 June 2018.)	FW	—	(Spain) Gerard Deulofeu	(England) Watford	€13,000,000 (Note: Fee may eventually rise to €17,000,000.)	
1 August 2018	DF	19	(France) Lucas Digne	(England) Everton	€20,200,000 (Note: Fee may eventually rise to €21,700,000.)	
4 August 2018	DF	22	(Spain) Aleix Vidal	(Spain) Sevilla	€8,500,000 (Note: Fee may eventually rise to €10,500,000.)	
9 August 2018	DF	24	(Colombia) Yerry Mina	(England) Everton	€30,250,000 (Note: Fee may eventually rise to €31,750,000.)	
16 August 2018	DF	—	(Brazil) Marlon	(Italy) Sassuolo	€6,000,000 (Note: Fee may eventually rise to €12,000,000.)	
11 January 2019	FW	19	(Spain) Munir	(Spain) Sevilla	€1,050,000	
15 January 2019	MF	—	(Brazil) Paulinho	(China) Guangzhou Evergrande	Undisclosed (Note: Fee reported as €42,000,000.)	
1 February 2019 (Note: Deal agreed 11 November 2018.)	FW	—	(Spain) Paco Alcácer	(Germany) Borussia Dortmund	€23,000,000 (Note: Fee may eventually rise to €28,000,000.)	
4 March 2019	MF	16	(Spain) Sergi Samper	(Japan) Vissel Kobe	Free	
Total					€102,000,000	

=== Loans in ===
Start date	End date	Position	No.	Player	From club	Fee	Ref.
20 December 2018	End of season	DF	17	(Colombia) Jeison Murillo	(Spain) Valencia	€2,000,000 (Note: Includes a purchase option worth €25,000,000.)	
21 January 2019	End of season	FW	19	(Ghana) Kevin-Prince Boateng	(Italy) Sassuolo	€1,000,000 (Note: Includes a purchase option worth €8,000,000.)	

=== Loans out ===
Start date	End date	Position	No.	Player	To club	Fee	Ref.
15 July 2018	End of season (Note: Purchase option triggered 15 January 2019.)	MF	15	(Brazil) Paulinho	(China) Guangzhou Evergrande	None (Note: Includes a purchase option.)	
23 July 2018	End of season	DF	—	(Brazil) Douglas	(Turkey) Sivasspor	None	
24 July 2018	End of season	GK	—	(Spain) Adrián Ortolá	(Spain) Deportivo La Coruña	None (Note: Includes a purchase option.)	
9 August 2018	End of season	MF	21	(Portugal) André Gomes	(England) Everton	€2,250,000	
28 August 2018	End of season (Note: Purchase option triggered 1 February 2019.)	FW	17	(Spain) Paco Alcácer	(Germany) Borussia Dortmund	€2,000,000 (Note: Includes a purchase option worth €23,000,000 which may eventually rise to €28,000,000.)	
31 January 2019	End of season	MF	6	(Spain) Denis Suárez	(England) Arsenal	None (Note: Includes a purchase option.)	

=== Transfer summary ===
Undisclosed fees are not included in the transfer totals.

Expenditure

Summer: ▼€107,900,000

Winter: ▼€4,000,000

Total: ▼€111,900,000

Income

Summer: ▲€82,200,000

Winter: ▲€24,050,000

Total: ▲€106,250,000

Net totals

Summer: ▼€25,700,000

Winter: ▲€20,050,000

Total: ▼€5,650,000

== Pre-season and friendlies ==
Win Draw Loss

=== International Champions Cup ===
Barcelona began their 2018–19 pre-season with a tour of the United States in the 2018 International Champions Cup. Barça played against Tottenham Hotspur at the Rose Bowl in Pasadena, Roma at the AT&T Stadium in Arlington and Milan at the Levi's Stadium in Santa Clara.

28 July 2018 ICC	Barcelona	2–2 (5–3 p)	Tottenham Hotspur	Pasadena, United States
20:00 PDT	Munir 15'; Arthur 29'	Report	Son Heung-min 73'; Nkoudou 75'	Stadium: Rose Bowl; Attendance: 66,805; Referee: Kevin Stott (United States)
	Penalties
	Palencia (penalty scored); Ruiz (penalty scored); Monchu (penalty scored); Puig (penalty scored); Malcom (penalty scored)		(penalty scored) Son Heung-min; (penalty scored) Davies; (penalty missed) Georgiou; (penalty scored) Sánchez

31 July 2018 ICC	Barcelona	2–4	Roma	Arlington, United States
21:00 CDT	Rafinha 6'; Malcom 49'	Report	El Shaarawy 35'; Florenzi 78'; Cristante 83'; Perotti 86' (pen.)	Stadium: AT&T Stadium; Attendance: 54,726; Referee: José Carlos Rivero (United States)

4 August 2018 ICC	Milan	1–0	Barcelona	Santa Clara, United States
17:00 PDT	Silva 90+3'	Report		Stadium: Levi's Stadium; Attendance: 51,391; Referee: Baldomero Toledo (United States)

=== Joan Gamper Trophy ===
The Blaugrana finished their pre-season preparations with the annual Joan Gamper Trophy match against Boca Juniors of Argentina at the Camp Nou on 15 August.

15 August 2018 Joan Gamper Trophy	Barcelona	3–0	Boca Juniors	Barcelona, Spain
18:15	Malcom 18'; Vidal (yellow card) 33'; Messi 39'; Rafinha 67'; Busquets (yellow card) 80'	Report		Stadium: Camp Nou; Attendance: 70,089; Referee: Undiano Mallenco (Navarre)

=== Supercopa de Catalunya ===
6 March 2019 Final	Barcelona	0–1	Girona	Sabadell
18:45 CET		Report	Stuani 69' (pen.), (yellow card) 86'; Montes (yellow card) 85'	Stadium: Nova Creu Alta; Attendance: 10,722; Referee: Medié Jiménez (Catalonia)

== Competitions ==
=== Overview ===
Competition	First match	Last match	Starting round	Final position	Record							
Competition	First match	Last match	Starting round	Final position	Pld	W	D	L	GF	GA	GD	Win %
La Liga	18 August 2018	19 May 2019	Matchday 1	Winners	38	26	9	3	90	36	+54	68.42
Copa del Rey	31 October 2018	25 May 2019	Round of 32	Runners-up	9	5	1	3	20	9	+11	55.56
Supercopa de España	12 August 2018		Final	Winners	1	1	0	0	2	1	+1	100.00
UEFA Champions League	18 September 2018	7 May 2019	Group stage	Semi-finals	12	8	3	1	26	10	+16	66.67
Total					60	40	13	7	138	56	+82	66.67

Source: Soccerway

=== La Liga ===
Barcelona were the defending champions. On 24 July 2018, the La Liga fixtures for the forthcoming season were announced.

==== Standings ====
Pos	Team	Pld	W	D	L	GF	GA	GD	Pts	Qualification or relegation
1	Barcelona (C)	38	26	9	3	90	36	+54	87	Qualification for the Champions League group stage
2	Atlético Madrid	38	22	10	6	55	29	+26	76	Qualification for the Champions League group stage
3	Real Madrid	38	21	5	12	63	46	+17	68	Qualification for the Champions League group stage
4	Valencia	38	15	16	7	51	35	+16	61	Qualification for the Champions League group stage
5	Getafe	38	15	14	9	48	35	+13	59 (Note: Getafe finished ahead of Sevilla on head-to-head points: Sevilla 0–2 Getafe, Getafe 3–0 Sevilla.)	Qualification for the Europa League group stage (Note: Since the winners of the 2018–19 Copa del Rey, Valencia, qualified for European competition based on league position, the spot awarded to the cup winners (Europa League group stage) was passed to the sixth-placed team and the spot awarded to the sixth-placed team (Europa League second qualifying round) was passed to the seventh-placed team.)

Source: La Liga, Soccerway
Rules for classification: 1) Points; 2) Head-to-head points; 3) Head-to-head goal difference; 4) Goal difference; 5) Goals scored; 6) Fair-play points (Note: Head-to-head record is used only after all the matches between the teams in question have been played)
(C) Champions

==== Results summary ====
Overall								Home						Away					
Pld	W	D	L	GF	GA	GD	Pts	W	D	L	GF	GA	GD	W	D	L	GF	GA	GD
38	26	9	3	90	36	+54	87	15	3	1	51	17	+34	11	6	2	39	19	+20

Last updated: 19 May 2019.
Source: La Liga

==== Results by round ====
Round	1	2	3	4	5	6	7	8	9	10	11	12	13	14	15	16	17	18	19	20	21	22	23	24	25	26	27	28	29	30	31	32	33	34	35	36	37	38
Ground	H	A	H	A	H	A	H	A	H	H	A	H	A	H	A	A	H	A	H	H	A	H	A	H	A	A	H	A	H	A	H	A	H	A	H	A	H	A
Result	W	W	W	W	D	L	D	D	W	W	W	L	D	W	W	W	W	W	W	W	W	D	D	W	W	W	W	W	W	D	W	D	W	W	W	L	W	D
Position	2	2	1	1	1	1	1	2	1	1	1	1	2	1	1	1	1	1	1	1	1	1	1	1	1	1	1	1	1	1	1	1	1	1	1	1	1	1

Updated to match(es) played on 19 May 2019. Source: La Liga
A = Away; H = Home; W = Win; D = Draw; L = Loss

==== Matches ====
18 August 2018 1	Barcelona	3–0	Alavés	Barcelona
22:15 CEST	Messi 64', 90+2'; Coutinho 83'	Report	Torres (yellow card) 10'; Maripán (yellow card) 41'	Stadium: Camp Nou; Attendance: 52,356; Referee: José María Sánchez Martínez (Murcia)

25 August 2018 2	Valladolid	0–1	Barcelona	Valladolid
22:15 CEST	Ünal (yellow card) 49'	Report	Dembélé 57'; Piqué (yellow card) 60'	Stadium: José Zorrilla; Attendance: 22,651; Referee: Ricardo de Burgos Bengoetxea (Basque Country)

2 September 2018 3	Barcelona	8–2	Huesca	Barcelona
18:30 CEST	Messi 16', 61'; Pulido 24' (o.g.); L. Suárez 39', 90+3' (pen.); Dembélé 48'; Rakitić 52'; Alba 81'; Vidal (yellow card) 88'	Report	Hernández 3'; Luisinho (yellow card) 26'; Gallar 42'; Musto (yellow card) 87'	Stadium: Camp Nou; Attendance: 72,892; Referee: Melero López (Andalusia)

15 September 2018 4	Real Sociedad	1–2	Barcelona	San Sebastián
16:15 CEST	Elustondo 12'; Illarramendi (yellow card) 43'	Report	L. Suárez 63'; Dembélé 66'; Umtiti (yellow card) 87'	Stadium: Anoeta; Attendance: 26,756; Referee: Del Cerro Grande (Community of Madrid)

23 September 2018 5	Barcelona	2–2	Girona	Barcelona
20:45 CEST	Semedo (yellow card) 12'; Arthur (yellow card) 15'; Messi 19'; Lenglet (red card) 35'; Piqué 63', (yellow card) 81'	Report	Stuani (yellow card) 16', (goal) 45', 51'; Bernardo (yellow card) 39'; Juanpe (yellow card) 61'; Alcalá (yellow card) 68'; Portu (yellow card) 69'	Stadium: Camp Nou; Attendance: 76,055; Referee: Gil Manzano (Extremadura)

26 September 2018 6	Leganés	2–1	Barcelona	Leganés
20:00 CEST	Pérez (yellow card) 40'; Bustinza (yellow card) 49'; El Zhar 52'; Óscar 53'; Nyom (yellow card) 88'; En-Nesyri (yellow card) 90+2'	Report	Coutinho 12'; Umtiti (yellow card) 60'; Vermaelen (yellow card) 64'	Stadium: Butarque; Attendance: 11,407; Referee: Undiano Mallenco (Navarre)

29 September 2018 7	Barcelona	1–1	Athletic Bilbao	Barcelona
16:15 CEST	Rakitić (yellow card) 78'; Munir 84'; Busquets (yellow card) 89'; Messi (yellow card) 90+4'	Report	De Marcos 41'; Yeray (yellow card) 48'; Nolaskoain (yellow card) 90'; D. García (yellow card) 90'	Stadium: Camp Nou; Attendance: 78,015; Referee: Jaime Latre (Aragon)

7 October 2018 8	Valencia	1–1	Barcelona	Valencia
20:45 CEST	Garay 2'; Carlos Soler (yellow card) 43'; Parejo (yellow card) 58'	Report	Messi 23'; L. Suárez (yellow card) 41'; Coutinho (yellow card) 58'	Stadium: Mestalla; Attendance: 46,249; Referee: González González (Castile and León)

20 October 2018 9	Barcelona	4–2	Sevilla	Barcelona
20:45 CEST	Coutinho 2'; Messi 12'; L. Suárez 63' (pen.); Rakitić 88'	Report	Vaclík (yellow card) 62'; Lenglet 79' (o.g.); L. Muriel 90+1'	Stadium: Camp Nou; Attendance: 88,712; Referee: Juan Martínez Munuera (Valencia)

28 October 2018 10	Barcelona	5–1	Real Madrid	Barcelona
16:15 CET	Coutinho 11'; L. Suárez 30' (pen.), 75', 83', (yellow card) 77'; Rakitić (yellow card) 38'; Vidal 87'	Report	Nacho (yellow card) 39'; Marcelo 50'; Bale (yellow card) 53'	Stadium: Camp Nou; Attendance: 93,265; Referee: José María Sánchez Martínez

4 November 2018 11	Rayo Vallecano	2–3	Barcelona	Vallecas
20:45 CET	Amat (yellow card) 6'; Pozo 35'; De Tomás (yellow card) 49'; Álvaro 57'; Alberto (yellow card) 89'; Velázquez (yellow card) 90+2'	Report	L. Suárez 11', 90'; Lenglet (yellow card) 17'; Alba (yellow card) 70'; Dembélé 87'	Stadium: Vallecas; Attendance: 13,875; Referee: Hernández Hernández

11 November 2018 12	Barcelona	3–4	Real Betis	Barcelona
16:15 CET	Rakitić (yellow card) 44' (yellow-red card) 81'; Busquets (yellow card) 59'; Messi 68' (pen.), 90+2'; Vidal (yellow card) 73', (goal) 79'	Report	Junior 20'; Guardado (yellow card) 23'; Joaquín 34'; Mandi (yellow card) 69'; Lo Celso 71'; Canales 83'	Stadium: Camp Nou; Attendance: 83,174; Referee: Mateu Lahoz (Valencian Community)

24 November 2018 13	Atlético Madrid	1–1	Barcelona	Madrid
20:45 CET	Hernandez (yellow card) 39'; Griezmann (yellow card) 48'; Costa (yellow card) 71', (goal) 77'; Rodri (yellow card) 86'; Filipe Luís (yellow card) 87'	Report	Busquets (yellow card) 29'; Umtiti (yellow card) 71'; Dembélé 90'; Rafinha (yellow card) 90+3'	Stadium: Wanda Metropolitano; Attendance: 67,204; Referee: Jesús Gil Manzano

2 December 2018 14	Barcelona	2–0	Villarreal	Barcelona
18:30 CET	Lenglet (yellow card) 18'; Piqué 36'; Alba (yellow card) 69'; Aleñá 87'	Report	Víctor Ruiz (yellow card) 11'; Álvaro (yellow card) 26'; P. Fornals (yellow card) 90'; Pedraza (yellow card) 90+1'	Stadium: Camp Nou; Attendance: 73,003; Referee: José Luis Munuera Montero

8 December 2018 15	Espanyol	0–4	Barcelona	Barcelona
20:45 CET	Vilà (yellow card) 79'	Report	Messi 17', 65'; Dembélé 26'; L. Suárez 45'	Stadium: RCDE Stadium; Attendance: 24,037; Referee: Del Cerro Grande (Community of Madrid)

16 December 2018 16	Levante	0–5	Barcelona	Valencia
20:45 CET	Róber (yellow card) 25'; Jason (yellow card) 59'; Cabaco (red card) 76'	Report	Dembélé (yellow card) 18'; L. Suárez 34'; Rakitić (yellow card) 36'; Messi 43', 47', 60'; Alba (yellow card) 45'; Piqué 88'	Stadium: Ciutat de València; Attendance: 23,736; Referee: González González

22 December 2018 17	Barcelona	2–0	Celta Vigo	Barcelona
18:30 CET	Dembélé 10'; Messi 45'	Report	Aspas (yellow card) 45'	Stadium: Camp Nou; Attendance: 78,686; Referee: Eduardo Prieto

6 January 2019 18	Getafe	1–2	Barcelona	Getafe
20:45 CET	Foulquier (yellow card) 15'; Mata 43'; Suárez (yellow card) 61'; Cabrera (yellow card) 69'; Maksimović (yellow card) 77'	Report	Arthur (yellow card) 12'; Alba (yellow card) 15'; Messi 20'; L. Suárez 39'; Vidal (yellow card) 65'	Stadium: Coliseum Alfonso Pérez; Attendance: 14,721; Referee: Guillermo Cuadra Fernández

13 January 2019 19	Barcelona	3–0	Eibar	Barcelona
18:30 CET	L. Suárez 19', 59', (yellow card) 44'; Messi 53'; Piqué (yellow card) 70'	Report	Enrich (yellow card) 42'	Stadium: Camp Nou; Attendance: 71,039; Referee: Jesús Gil Manzano

20 January 2019 20	Barcelona	3–1	Leganés	Barcelona
20:45 CET	Busquets (yellow card) 12'; Dembélé 32'; Aleñá (yellow card) 54'; Roberto (yellow card) 60'; L. Suárez 71'; Messi 90+2'	Report	Braithwaite (yellow card) 8', (goal) 57'; Tarín (yellow card) 22'; Omeruo (yellow card) 30'	Stadium: Camp Nou; Attendance: 50,670; Referee: Ricardo de Burgos Bengoetxea (Basque Country)

27 January 2019 21	Girona	0–2	Barcelona	Girona
16:15 CET	Espinosa (yellow card) 29' (yellow-red card) 51'; Bounou (yellow card) 52'; Juanpe (yellow card) 69'; Stuani (yellow card) 89'	Report	Semedo 9'; Lenglet (yellow card) 31'; Vidal (yellow card) 37'; Busquets (yellow card) 43'; Messi 68'	Stadium: Montilivi; Attendance: 14,021; Referee: Pablo González Fuertes

2 February 2019 22	Barcelona	2–2	Valencia	Barcelona
18:30 CET	Roberto (yellow card) 31'; Messi 39' (pen.), 64'; Rakitić (yellow card) 45'; Alba (yellow card) 90+1'	Report	Gameiro 24'; Parejo 32' (pen.)	Stadium: Camp Nou; Attendance: 76,789; Referee: Alberto Undiano Mallenco

10 February 2019 23	Athletic Bilbao	0–0	Barcelona	Bilbao
20:45 CET	D. García (yellow card) 52'; De Marcos (yellow card) 68' (yellow-red card) 90+1'; Yeray (yellow card) 90+1'	Report	Lenglet (yellow card) 72'; Busquets (yellow card) 78'	Stadium: San Mamés; Attendance: 47,557; Referee: Carlos del Cerro Grande

16 February 2019 24	Barcelona	1–0	Valladolid	Barcelona
20:45 CET	Messi 43' (pen.), (yellow card) 67'	Report	Ünal (yellow card) 11'; Anuar (yellow card) 34'; Míchel (yellow card) 70'	Stadium: Camp Nou; Attendance: 67,435; Referee: Juan Martínez Munuera

23 February 2019 25	Sevilla	2–4	Barcelona	Seville
16:15 CET	Navas 22'; Mercado 42'; Rog (yellow card) 49'; Wöber (yellow card) 57'; Vázquez (yellow card) 70'; Kjær (yellow card) 80'; Sarabia (yellow card) 83'; Mesa (yellow card) 90'	Report	Messi 26', 67', 85'; Piqué (yellow card) 38'; L. Suárez 90+3'	Stadium: Ramón Sánchez Pizjuán; Attendance: 40,661; Referee: Antonio Mateu Lahoz

2 March 2019 26	Real Madrid	0–1	Barcelona	Madrid
20:45 CET	Ramos (yellow card) 61'; Asensio (yellow card) 82'; Carvajal (yellow card) 89'	Report	Busquets (yellow card) 2'; Rakitić 26'; Lenglet (yellow card) 63'	Stadium: Santiago Bernabéu; Attendance: 78,921; Referee: Alberto Undiano Mallenco

9 March 2019 27	Barcelona	3–1	Rayo Vallecano	Barcelona
18:30 CET	Piqué 38'; Messi 51' (pen.); Busquets (yellow card) 79'; L. Suárez 82'	Report	De Tomás 24'; Velázquez (yellow card) 68'; Imbula (yellow card) 89'	Stadium: Camp Nou; Attendance: 74,158; Referee: Melero López (Andalusia)

17 March 2019 28	Real Betis	1–4	Barcelona	Seville
20:45 CET	Guardado (yellow card) 16'; Loren 82'	Report	Messi 18', 45+2', 85'; Lenglet (yellow card) 52'; L. Suárez 63'; Semedo (yellow card) 67'	Stadium: Benito Villamarín; Attendance: 54,172; Referee: Ricardo de Burgos Bengoetxea (Basque Country)

30 March 2019 29	Barcelona	2–0	Espanyol	Barcelona
16:15 CET	Messi 71', 89'	Report	Sánchez (yellow card) 69'; Granero (yellow card) 73'; Pedrosa (yellow card) 87'; Rosales (yellow card) 90+3'	Stadium: Camp Nou; Attendance: 92,795; Referee: Carlos del Cerro Grande

2 April 2019 30	Villarreal	4–4	Barcelona	Villarreal
21:30 CEST	Chukwueze 23'; Álvaro (yellow card) 36' (yellow-red card) 86'; Funes Mori (yellow card) 45+1'; Toko Ekambi 50'; Iborra 62'; Bacca 80'; Cáseres (yellow card) 90+1'	Report	Coutinho 12'; Malcom 16'; Busquets (yellow card) 39'; Lenglet (yellow card) 42'; Vidal (yellow card) 77'; Aleñá (yellow card) 83'; Messi (yellow card) 84', (goal) 90'; Roberto (yellow card) 85'; L. Suárez (yellow card) 90+1', (goal) 90+3'	Stadium: Estadio de la Cerámica; Attendance: 19,515; Referee: Alejandro Hernández Hernández

6 April 2019 31	Barcelona	2–0	Atlético Madrid	Barcelona
20:45 CEST	Piqué (yellow card) 74'; Lenglet (yellow card) 78'; L. Suárez 85', (yellow card) 86'; Messi 86'	Report	Partey (yellow card) 27'; Giménez (yellow card) 28'; Costa (red card) 28'; Godín (yellow card) 29'; Saúl (yellow card) 71'	Stadium: Camp Nou; Attendance: 92,453; Referee: Jesús Gil Manzano

13 April 2019 32	Huesca	0–0	Barcelona	Huesca
12:00 CEST	Pulido (yellow card) 90+1'	Report	Todibo (yellow card) 42'; Wagué (yellow card) 90'	Stadium: El Alcoraz; Attendance: 7,332; Referee: Guillermo Cuadra Fernández

20 April 2019 33	Barcelona	2–1	Real Sociedad	Barcelona
20:45 CEST	Lenglet 45'; Alba 64'	Report	Merino (yellow card) 15'; Juanmi 62'	Stadium: Camp Nou; Attendance: 75,470; Referee: Pablo González Fuertes

23 April 2019 34	Alavés	0–2	Barcelona	Vitoria-Gasteiz
21:30 CEST	Jony (yellow card) 33'; Navarro (yellow card) 56'; Pina (yellow card) 90+4'	Report	Aleñá 54'; L. Suárez 60' (pen.); Coutinho (yellow card) 76'	Stadium: Mendizorrotza; Attendance: 18,735; Referee: Adrián Cordero Vega

27 April 2019 35	Barcelona	1–0	Levante	Barcelona
20:45 CEST	Rakitić (yellow card) 14'; Messi 62'; Piqué (yellow card) 70'; Semedo (yellow card) 77'; Busquets (yellow card) 90+1'	Report	Rochina (yellow card) 56'; Vezo (yellow card) 58'; Coke (yellow card) 83'	Stadium: Camp Nou; Attendance: 91,917; Referee: Ricardo de Burgos Bengoetxea

4 May 2019 36	Celta Vigo	2–0	Barcelona	Vigo
20:45 CEST	Boufal (yellow card) 31'; Gómez 67'; Aspas 88' (pen.)	Report	Vermaelen (yellow card) 14'; Umtiti (yellow card) 29'; Todibo (yellow card) 55'; Prince (yellow card) 72'; Vidal (yellow card) 79'	Stadium: Abanca-Balaídos; Attendance: 22,519; Referee: José María Sánchez Martínez

12 May 2019 37	Barcelona	2–0	Getafe	Barcelona
18:30 CEST	Vidal 39', (yellow card) 76'; Arambarri 89' (o.g.)	Report	Foulquier (yellow card) 37'; Olivera (yellow card) 52'; Djené (yellow card) 90+3'	Stadium: Camp Nou; Attendance: 57,088; Referee: González González (Castile and León)

19 May 2019 38	Eibar	2–2	Barcelona	Eibar
16:15 CEST	Cucurella 20'; Ramis (yellow card) 33'; De Blasis (yellow card) 44', (goal) 45'; José Ángel (yellow card) 80'; Escalante (yellow card) 83'	Report	Messi 31', 32'; Semedo (yellow card) 42'; Alba (yellow card) 83'	Stadium: Ipurua; Attendance: 5,145; Referee: José Luis Munuera Montero (Andalusia)

=== Copa del Rey ===
Barcelona entered the competition as the four-time defending champions, having won consecutive editions in 2014–15, 2015–16, 2016–17 and 2017–18.

==== Round of 32 ====
31 October 2018 First leg	Cultural Leonesa	0–1	Barcelona	León
21:30 CET	S. González (yellow card) 26'; Escalante (yellow card) 53'; Calvo (yellow card) 78'; Palatsí (yellow card) 82'; Ortiz (yellow card) 83'; Garrido (yellow card) 90'; Marcos (yellow card) 90+4' (yellow-red card) 90+4'	Report	Miranda (yellow card) 41'; Lenglet 90+1'	Stadium: Estadio Reino de León; Attendance: 10,873; Referee: Mario Melero López

5 December 2018 Second leg	Barcelona	4–1 (5–1 agg.)	Cultural Leonesa	Barcelona
21:30 CET	Munir 18'; D. Suárez 26', 70'; Miranda (yellow card) 36'; Malcom 43'	Report	Señé 54'	Stadium: Camp Nou; Attendance: 76,398; Referee: Alberto Undiano Mallenco

==== Round of 16 ====
10 January 2019 First leg	Levante	2–1	Barcelona	Valencia
21:30 CET	Cabaco 4', (yellow card) 49'; Mayoral 18', (yellow card) 90+3'; Prcić (yellow card) 41'	Report	Murillo (yellow card) 22'; Aleñá (yellow card) 39'; Chumi (yellow card) 43'; Busquets (yellow card) 74'; Coutinho 85' (pen.)	Stadium: Estadi Ciutat de València; Attendance: 17,614; Referee: Ricardo de Burgos Bengoetxea

17 January 2019 Second leg	Barcelona	3–0 (4–2 agg.)	Levante	Barcelona
21:30 CET	Dembélé 30', 31'; Rakitić (yellow card) 43'; Murillo (yellow card) 45'; Messi 54'	Report	Postigo (yellow card) 33'; Cabaco (yellow card) 75'; Prcić (yellow card) 84'; Róber (yellow card) 90+2'	Stadium: Camp Nou; Attendance: 42,838; Referee: José María Sánchez Martínez

==== Quarter-finals ====
23 January 2019 First leg	Sevilla	2–0	Barcelona	Seville
21:30 CET	Sarabia 58'; Gómez (yellow card) 74'; Ben Yedder 76'	Report	Alba (yellow card) 84'	Stadium: Ramón Sánchez Pizjuán; Attendance: 38,403; Referee: Carlos del Cerro Grande

30 January 2019 Second leg	Barcelona	6–1 (6–3 agg.)	Sevilla	Barcelona
21:30 CET	Coutinho 13' (pen.), 53'; L. Suárez (yellow card) 30', (goal) 89'; Rakitić 31'; Roberto 54'; Messi 90+2'	Report	Mesa (yellow card) 30'; Carriço (yellow card) 34'; Arana 67'; Gómez (yellow card) 72'	Stadium: Camp Nou; Attendance: 58,050; Referee: José María Sánchez Martínez

==== Semi-finals ====
6 February 2019 First leg	Barcelona	1–1	Real Madrid	Barcelona
21:00 CET	Semedo (yellow card) 43'; L. Suárez (yellow card) 56'; Malcom 57'; Alba (yellow card) 58'; Vidal (yellow card) 88'	Report	Vázquez 6'; Ramos (yellow card) 10'; Marcelo (yellow card) 57'	Stadium: Camp Nou; Attendance: 92,008; Referee: Antonio Mateu Lahoz

27 February 2019 Second leg	Real Madrid	0–3 (1–4 agg.)	Barcelona	Madrid
21:00 CET	Vázquez (yellow card) 58'; Casemiro (yellow card) 72'	Report	L. Suárez 50', 73' (pen.); Busquets (yellow card) 65'; Varane 69' (o.g.); Semedo (yellow card) 81'	Stadium: Santiago Bernabéu; Attendance: 80,472; Referee: José María Sánchez Martínez

==== Final ====
25 May 2019 Final	Barcelona	1–2	Valencia	Seville
21:00 CEST	Busquets (yellow card) 61'; Messi 73'; Vidal (yellow card) 89'	Report	Gameiro 21'; Rodrigo 33'; Gayà (yellow card) 53'; Kondogbia (yellow card) 70'	Stadium: Benito Villamarín; Attendance: 53,698; Referee: Alberto Undiano Mallenco

=== Supercopa de España ===
As the winners of the 2017–18 Copa del Rey and 2017–18 La Liga, Barcelona faced the Copa del Rey runners-up, Sevilla, for the season-opening Supercopa de España. For the first time in the tournament history, it was a single match hosted in a neutral venue at the Stade Ibn Batouta in Tangier, Morocco.

12 August 2018 Final	Sevilla	1–2	Barcelona	Tangier, Morocco
22:00 CEST	Sarabia 9'; Vázquez (yellow card) 24'; Mesa (yellow card) 69'; Vidal (yellow card) 90+4'	Report	Busquets (yellow card) 16'; Piqué 42'; Dembélé 78'; Ter Stegen (yellow card) 90'; Lenglet (yellow card) 90+2'	Stadium: Stade Ibn Batouta; Attendance: 40,000; Referee: Del Cerro Grande (Community of Madrid)

=== UEFA Champions League ===
On 30 August, Barcelona were drawn in Group B of the UEFA Champions League alongside Tottenham Hotspur from Premier League, PSV Eindhoven from Eredivise and Internazionale from Serie A. After topping Group B, Barcelona advanced to knockout phase as a seeded team, and were drawn against Lyon from Ligue 1 in the round of 16. In the draw for the quarter-finals, Barcelona were drawn against Premier League side Manchester United, and in the draw for the semi-finals, against the winner of the tie between Liverpool and Porto, if Barcelona advance to a further round. Originally, the quarter-finals match was scheduled to be played with the first leg at Camp Nou and the second leg at Old Trafford, but the order of the two legs was reversed to avoid Manchester United and Manchester City from playing home on the same night or on consecutive nights.

==== Group stage ====
Pos	Team	Pld	W	D	L	GF	GA	GD	Pts	Qualification
1	(Spain) Barcelona	6	4	2	0	14	5	+9	14	Advance to knockout phase
2	(England) Tottenham Hotspur	6	2	2	2	9	10	−1	8 (Note: Head-to-head away goals: Tottenham Hotspur 1, Inter Milan 0.)	Advance to knockout phase
3	(Italy) Inter Milan	6	2	2	2	6	7	−1	8	Transfer to Europa League
4	(Netherlands) PSV Eindhoven	6	0	2	4	6	13	−7	2	

Source: UEFA
Rules for classification: Group stage tiebreakers
Notes:

18 September 2018 1	Barcelona (Spain)	4–0	(Netherlands) PSV Eindhoven	Barcelona, Spain
18:55 CEST	Messi 31', 77', 87'; Umtiti (yellow card) 55' (yellow-red card) 79'; Dembélé 74'	UEFA Report; Club Report	Viergever (yellow card) 30'; De Jong (yellow card) 57'	Stadium: Camp Nou; Attendance: 73,462; Referee: Anastasios Sidiropoulos (Greece)

3 October 2018 2	Tottenham Hotspur (England)	2–4	(Spain) Barcelona	London, England
21:00 BST	Aiderweireld (yellow card) 14'; Wanyama (yellow card) 41'; Lamela (yellow card) 43', (goal) 66'; Kane 52', (yellow card) 74'; Dier (yellow card) 90+3'	UEFA Report; Club Report	Coutinho 2'; Rakitić 28'; Messi 56', 90'; Arthur (yellow card) 59'; Busquets (yellow card) 71'	Stadium: Wembley Stadium; Attendance: 82,137; Referee: Felix Zwayer (Germany)

24 October 2018 3	Barcelona (Spain)	2–0	(Italy) Inter Milan	Barcelona, Spain
21:00 CEST	Rafinha 32'; L. Suárez (yellow card) 62'; Alba 83'	UEFA Report; Club Report	Brozović (yellow card) 73'; Škriniar (yellow card) 74'; Martínez (yellow card) 85'	Stadium: Camp Nou; Attendance: 86,290; Referee: Ovidiu Haţegan (Romania)

6 November 2018 4	Inter Milan (Italy)	1–1	(Spain) Barcelona	Milan, Italy
21:00 CET	Brozović (yellow card) 84'; Icardi 87'; Perišić (yellow card) 88'	UEFA Report; Club Report	Rakitić (yellow card) 43'; Malcom 83'	Stadium: San Siro; Attendance: 70,915; Referee: Szymon Marciniak (Poland)

28 November 2018 5	PSV Eindhoven (Netherlands)	1–2	(Spain) Barcelona	Eindhoven, Netherlands
21:00 CET	Hendrix (yellow card) 25'; De Jong 83', (yellow card) 84'; Gutiérrez (yellow card) 83'	UEFA Report; Club Report	Messi 61'; Piqué 70', (yellow card) 90+3'; Alba (yellow card) 86'	Stadium: Philips Stadion; Attendance: 34,600; Referee: Pavel Královec (Czech Republic)

11 December 2018 6	Barcelona (Spain)	1–1	(England) Tottenham Hotspur	Barcelona, Spain
21:00 CET	Dembélé 7'; Semedo (yellow card) 68'	UEFA Report; Club Report	Walker-Peters (yellow card) 15'; Lucas 85'	Stadium: Camp Nou; Attendance: 69,961; Referee: Milorad Mažić (Serbia)

==== Knockout phase ====
===== Round of 16 =====
19 February 2019 First leg	Lyon (France)	0–0	(Spain) Barcelona	Décines-Charpieu, France
21:00 CET	Aouar (yellow card) 3'; Dubois (yellow card) 33'	UEFA Report; Club Report	Roberto (yellow card) 80'; Semedo (yellow card) 88'	Stadium: Parc Olympique Lyonnais; Attendance: 57,889; Referee: Cüneyt Çakır (Turkey)

13 March 2019 Second leg	Barcelona (Spain)	5–1 (5–1 agg.)	(France) Lyon	Barcelona, Spain
21:00 CET	Messi 18' (pen.), 78'; Coutinho 31'; Lenglet (yellow card) 49'; Piqué 81'; Dembélé 86'	UEFA Report; Club Report	Marçal (yellow card) 33'; Dembélé (yellow card) 45+4'; Tousart 58'	Stadium: Camp Nou; Attendance: 92,346; Referee: Szymon Marciniak (Poland)

===== Quarter-finals =====
10 April 2019 First leg	Manchester United (England)	0–1	(Spain) Barcelona	Greater Manchester, England
20:00 BST	Shaw (yellow card) 19'; Lingard (yellow card) 76'; Smalling (yellow card) 85'	UEFA Report; Club Report	Shaw 12' (o.g.); Busquets (yellow card) 17'; Vidal (yellow card) 71'	Stadium: Old Trafford; Attendance: 74,093; Referee: Gianluca Rocchi (Italy)

16 April 2019 Second leg	Barcelona (Spain)	3–0 (4–0 agg.)	(England) Manchester United	Barcelona, Spain
21:00 CEST	Messi 16', 20'; Coutinho 61'; L. Suárez (yellow card) 77'	UEFA Report; Club Report		Stadium: Camp Nou; Attendance: 96,708; Referee: Felix Brych (Germany)

===== Semi-finals =====
1 May 2019 First leg	Barcelona (Spain)	3–0	(England) Liverpool	Barcelona, Spain
21:00 CEST	L. Suárez 26', (yellow card) 81'; Lenglet (yellow card) 39'; Messi 75', 82'; Alba (yellow card) 86'	UEFA Report; Club Report	Fabinho (yellow card) 81'	Stadium: Camp Nou; Attendance: 98,299; Referee: Björn Kuipers (Netherlands)

7 May 2019 Second leg	Liverpool (England)	4–0 (4–3 agg.)	(Spain) Barcelona	Liverpool, England
20:00 BST	Origi 7', 79'; Fabinho (yellow card) 11'; Wijnaldum 54', 56'; Matip (yellow card) 66'	UEFA Report; Club Report	Busquets (yellow card) 45+1'; Rakitić (yellow card) 53'; Semedo (yellow card) 75'	Stadium: Anfield; Attendance: 55,212; Referee: Cüneyt Çakır (Turkey)

== Statistics ==
=== Squad appearances and goals ===
Last updated on 19 May 2019.

No.	Pos	Nat	Player	Total		La Liga		Champions League		Copa del Rey		Supercopa	
No.	Pos	Nat	Player	Apps	Goals	Apps	Goals	Apps	Goals	Apps	Goals	Apps	Goals
Goalkeepers
1	GK	(Germany) GER	Marc-André ter Stegen	49	0	35	0	11	0	2	0	1	0
13	GK	(Netherlands) NED	Jasper Cillessen	11	0	3	0	1	0	7	0	0	0
Defenders
2	DF	(Portugal) POR	Nélson Semedo	41	1	20+6	1	5	0	8+1	0	1	0
3	DF	(Spain) ESP	Gerard Piqué	52	7	35	4	11	2	5	0	1	1
6	DF	(France) FRA	Jean-Clair Todibo	2	0	2	0	0	0	0	0	0	0
15	DF	(France) FRA	Clément Lenglet	44	2	22+1	1	11+1	0	5+3	1	1	0
17	DF	(Colombia) COL	Jeison Murillo	4	0	1+1	0	0	0	2	0	0	0
18	DF	(Spain) ESP	Jordi Alba	54	3	32+4	2	11	1	5+1	0	1	0
23	DF	(France) FRA	Samuel Umtiti	15	0	13+1	0	1	0	0	0	0	0
24	DF	(Belgium) BEL	Thomas Vermaelen	12	0	7+2	0	1+1	0	1	0	0	0
27	DF	(Spain) ESP	Juan Miranda	4	0	0	0	1	0	3	0	0	0
33	DF	(Spain) ESP	Jorge Cuenca	1	0	0	0	0	0	1	0	0	0
36	DF	(Spain) ESP	Juan Brandáriz	3	0	0	0	0	0	3	0	0	0
40	DF	(Senegal) SEN	Moussa Wagué	3	0	2+1	0	0	0	0	0	0	0
Midfielders
4	MF	(Croatia) CRO	Ivan Rakitić	54	5	29+5	3	12	1	7	1	0+1	0
5	MF	(Spain) ESP	Sergio Busquets	54	0	30+5	0	11+1	0	5+1	0	1	0
8	MF	(Brazil) BRA	Arthur	44	0	19+8	0	7+2	0	5+2	0	1	0
12	MF	(Brazil) BRA	Rafinha	8	1	3+2	0	1+1	1	0	0	1	0
20	MF	(Spain) ESP	Sergi Roberto	44	1	23+6	0	8+1	0	4+2	1	0	0
21	MF	(Spain) ESP	Carles Aleñá	27	2	6+11	2	1+2	0	3+4	0	0	0
22	MF	(Chile) CHI	Arturo Vidal	53	3	22+11	3	3+8	0	4+4	0	0+1	0
28	MF	(Spain) ESP	Riqui Puig	3	0	2	0	0	0	0+1	0	0	0
34	MF	(Spain) ESP	Álex Collado	1	0	1	0	0	0	0	0	0	0
35	MF	(Spain) ESP	Oriol Busquets	1	0	0	0	0	0	1	0	0	0
43	MF	(Spain) ESP	Carles Pérez	1	0	1	0	0	0	0	0	0	0
Forwards
7	FW	(Brazil) BRA	Philippe Coutinho	54	11	22+12	5	11+1	3	5+2	3	0+1	0
9	FW	(Uruguay) URU	Luis Suárez	49	25	31+2	21	10	1	3+2	3	1	0
10	FW	(Argentina) ARG	Lionel Messi	50	51	29+5	36	9+1	12	4+1	3	1	0
11	FW	(France) FRA	Ousmane Dembélé	42	14	20+9	8	5+3	3	4	2	1	1
14	FW	(Brazil) BRA	Malcom	24	4	6+9	1	0+3	1	6	2	0	0
19	FW	(Ghana) GHA	Kevin-Prince Boateng	4	0	3	0	0	0	1	0	0	0
29	FW	(Spain) ESP	Abel Ruiz	1	0	0+1	0	0	0	0	0	0	0
Players who have made an appearance this season but have left the club
6	MF	(Spain) ESP	Denis Suárez	8	2	0+2	0	0+2	0	2+2	2	0	0
16	MF	(Spain) ESP	Sergi Samper	1	0	0	0	0	0	1	0	0	0
19	FW	(Spain) ESP	Munir	11	2	1+6	1	1+1	0	2	1	0	0

=== Squad statistics ===
	League	Europe	Cup	Others	Total
Games played	38	12	9	1	60
Games won	26	8	5	1	40
Games drawn	9	3	1	0	13
Games lost	3	1	3	0	7
Goals scored	90	26	20	2	138
Goals conceded	36	10	9	1	56
Goal difference	54	16	11	1	82
Clean sheets	17	6	3	0	26
Goal by Substitute	8	2	1	0	11
Total shots	–	–	–	–	–
Shots on target	–	–	–	–	–
Corners	–	–	–	–	–
Players used	–	–	–	–	–
Offsides	–	–	–	–	–
Fouls suffered	–	–	–	–	–
Fouls committed	–	–	–	–	–
Yellow cards	70	19	18	3	110
Red cards	2	1	0	0	3

Last updated: 22 December 2018
Source: La liga statistics, UEFA Champions League statistics, Copa del Rey statistics

=== Goalscorers ===
No.	Pos.	Nation	Name	La Liga	Champions League	Copa del Rey	Supercopa de España	Total
10	FW	(Argentina)	Messi	36	12	3	0	51
9	FW	(Uruguay)	Suárez	21	1	3	0	25
11	FW	(France)	O. Dembélé	8	3	2	1	14
7	FW	(Brazil)	Coutinho	5	3	3	0	11
3	DF	(Spain)	Piqué	4	2	0	1	7
4	MF	(Croatia)	I. Rakitić	3	1	1	0	5
14	FW	(Brazil)	Malcom	1	1	2	0	4
18	DF	(Spain)	Jordi Alba	2	1	0	0	3
22	MF	(Chile)	Vidal	3	0	0	0	3
15	DF	(France)	Lenglet	1	0	1	0	2
21	MF	(Spain)	Aleñá	2	0	0	0	2
2	DF	(Portugal)	N. Semedo	1	0	0	0	1
12	MF	(Brazil)	Rafinha	0	1	0	0	1
20	MF	(Spain)	S. Roberto	0	0	1	0	1
~~6~~	MF	(Spain)	Denis Suárez	0	0	2	0	2
~~19~~	FW	(Spain)	Munir	1	0	1	0	2
Own goals				2	1	1	0	4
TOTAL				90	26	20	2	138

As of match played 25 May 2019.

=== Hat-tricks ===
Player	Against	Result	Date	Competition	Ref
(Argentina) Lionel Messi	(Netherlands) PSV Eindhoven	4–0 (H)	18 September 2018	UEFA Champions League	
(Uruguay) Luis Suárez	(Spain) Real Madrid	5–1 (H)	28 October 2018	La Liga	
(Argentina) Lionel Messi	(Spain) Levante	5–0 (A)	16 December 2018	La Liga	
(Argentina) Lionel Messi	(Spain) Sevilla	4–2 (A)	23 February 2019	La Liga	
(Argentina) Lionel Messi	(Spain) Real Betis	4–1 (A)	17 March 2019	La Liga	

(H) – Home; (A) – Away

=== Clean sheets ===
No.	Name	La Liga	Copa del Rey	Champions League	Supercopa de España	Total
1	(Germany) Ter Stegen	15	1	5	0	21
13	(Netherlands) Cillessen	0	2	0	0	2
Total		15	3	5	0	23

As of match played 7 April 2019.

=== Disciplinary record ===
N	P	Nat.	Name	La Liga			Champions League			Copa del Rey			Supercopa de España			Total			Notes
N	P	Nat.	Name	Yellow card	Second yellow card	Red card	Yellow card	Second yellow card	Red card	Yellow card	Second yellow card	Red card	Yellow card	Second yellow card	Red card	Yellow card	Second yellow card	Red card	Notes
1	GK	(Germany)	Ter Stegen										1			1			
2	DF	(Portugal)	N. Semedo	4			2			2						8			
3	DF	(Spain)	Piqué	6			1									7			
4	MF	(Croatia)	I. Rakitić	6	1		1			1						8	1		
5	MF	(Spain)	Sergio	10			2			2			1			15			
6	MF	(France)	Todibo	2												2			
7	FW	(Brazil)	Coutinho	2												2			
8	MF	(Brazil)	Arthur	2			1									3			
9	FW	(Uruguay)	Suárez	5			3			2						10			
10	FW	(Argentina)	Messi	3												3			
11	FW	(France)	O. Dembelé	1												1			
12	MF	(Brazil)	Rafinha	1												1			
15	DF	(France)	Lenglet	8		1	2						1			11		1	
17	DF	(Colombia)	Murillo							2						2			
18	DF	(Spain)	Jordi Alba	5			2			2						9			
19	DF	(Ghana)	Prince	1												1			
20	MF	(Spain)	S. Roberto	3			1									4			
21	FW	(Spain)	Aleñá	2						1						3			
22	MF	(Chile)	Vidal	6			1			1						8			
23	DF	(France)	Umtiti	4				1								4	1		
24	DF	(Belgium)	Vermaelen	2												2			
27	DF	(Spain)	Miranda							2						2			
36	DF	(Spain)	Chumi							1						1			
40	MF	(Senegal)	Wagué	1												1			

Last updated: 4 May 2019
Source: ESPNFC.com, FCBarcelona.com
Ordered by (red card) , (second yellow card) and (yellow card)
(yellow card) = Number of bookings; (second yellow card) = Number of sending offs after a second yellow card; (red card) = Number of sending offs by a direct red card.

=== Injury record ===
N	P	Nat.	Name	Type	Status	Source	Match	Inj. Date	Ret. Date
13	GK	(Netherlands)	Cillessen	intercostal muscle sprain		FCB.com	in training	22 August 2018	2 September 2018
14	FW	(Brazil)	Malcom	right ankle injury		FCB.com	in training	3 September 2018	24 September 2018
23	DF	(France)	Umtiti	right knee injury		FCB.com	in training	28 September 2018	11 November 2018
20	MF	(Spain)	S. Roberto	pulled rectus femoris muscle in right thigh		FCB.com	vs Athletic Bilbao	29 September 2018	20 October 2018
24	DF	(Belgium)	Vermaelen	biceps femoris injury in the right leg		FCB.com	vs Switzerland with Belgium	12 October 2018	5 December 2018
10	FW	(Argentina)	Messi	fracture of the radial bone in the right arm		FCB.com	vs Sevilla	20 October 2018	9 November 2018
16	MF	(Spain)	Samper	right soleus injury		FCB.com	vs Cultural Leonesa	31 October 2018	19 January 2019
7	FW	(Brazil)	Coutinho	small rupture in the biceps femoris of the left leg		FCB.com	vs Internazionale	6 November 2018	26 November 2018
4	MF	(Croatia)	I. Rakitić	hamstring strain in the right leg		FCB.com	vs Spain with Croatia	15 November 2018	26 November 2018
20	MF	(Spain)	S.Roberto	hamstring injury in the left leg		FCB.com	vs Atlético Madrid	24 November 2018	6 January 2019
12	MF	(Brazil)	Rafinha	tear in the left anterior cruciate ligament		FCB.com	vs Atlético Madrid	24 November 2018	
9	FW	(Uruguay)	Suárez	right knee injury		FCB.com	vs Atlético Madrid	24 November 2018	8 December 2018
13	GK	(Netherlands)	Cillessen	small muscle tear in the right leg		FCB.com	vs Atlético Madrid in warm-up	24 November 2018	5 December 2018
8	MF	(Brazil)	Arthur	adductor strain		FCB.com	vs Atlético Madrid	24 November 2018	11 December 2018
23	DF	(France)	Umtiti	left knee injury		FCB.com	vs PSV Eindhoven in warm-up	28 November 2018	23 February 2019
14	FW	(Brazil)	Malcom	right ankle sprain		FCB.com	vs Cultural Leonesa	5 December 2018	6 January 2019
24	DF	(Belgium)	Vermaelen	tear muscle in the right calf		FCB.com	vs Levante	16 December 2018	19 January 2019
11	FW	(France)	Dembélé	left ankle sprain		FCB.com	vs Leganés	19 January 2019	10 February 2019
13	GK	(Netherlands)	Cillessen	muscle tear in the right calf		FCB.com	in training	1 February 2019	27 February 2019
8	MF	(Brazil)	Arthur	left hamstring injury		FCB.com	vs Real Madrid	6 February 2019	27 February 2019
24	DF	(Belgium)	Vermaelen	muscle overload in the right leg		FCB.com	vs Real Valladolid	17 February 2019	24 March 2019
11	FW	(France)	Dembélé	left hamstring injury		FCB.com	vs Rayo Vallecano	9 March 2019	13 March 2019
11	FW	(France)	Dembélé	torn the femoral biceps muscle in left hamstring		FCB.com	vs Lyon	13 March 2019	10 April 2019
9	FW	(Uruguay)	Suárez	right ankle sprain		FCB.com	vs Real Betis	17 March 2019	30 March 2019
11	FW	(France)	Dembélé	right hamstring injury		FCB.com	vs Celta Vigo	4 May 2019	

- Player is injured
- Player has recovered from injury
Last updated: 4 May 2019
Source: FCBarcelona.com
