= Santi García =

Spanish footballer

Personal information
- Full name: Santiago García González
- Date of birth: 29 August 2001 (age 25)
- Place of birth: Madrid, Spain
- Height: 1.84 m (6 ft 0 in)
- Position: Midfielder

Team information
- Current team: Gil Vicente
- Number: 95

Youth career
- 2012–2014: Atlético Madrid
- 2014–2019: Trival Valderas

Senior career*
| Years | Team | Apps | (Gls) |
| 2019–2020 | Trival Valderas | 18 | (1) |
| 2021–2024 | Getafe B | 79 | (19) |
| 2023–2024 | Getafe | 1 | (0) |
| 2024– | Gil Vicente | 60 | (10) |
- * Club domestic league appearances and goals as of 25 May 2026

Santiago "Santi" García González (born 29 August 2001) is a Spanish professional footballer who plays as a midfielder for Primeira Liga club Gil Vicente FC.

== Career ==
García was born in Madrid, and was a CF Trival Valderas youth graduate. He made his first team debut on 22 September 2019, coming on as a late substitute in a 1–0 Tercera División home win over Villaverde San Andrés.

García scored his first senior goal on 6 October 2019, netting Trival's second in a 3–0 away win over CD Móstoles URJC. On 19 August 2020, he moved to Getafe CF and was initially assigned to the reserves in Segunda División B.

In February 2022, already established as a starter for the B-team, García suffered a knee injury and was sidelined for the remainder of the season. Upon returning, he scored 11 goals in the 2022–23 campaign as the B's achieved promotion to Segunda Federación; highlights included a brace in a 3–1 home win over Córdoba CF B which sealed the club's promotion.

García made his first team – and La Liga – debut on 20 August 2023, replacing Carles Aleñá in a 3–0 away loss to Girona FC. It was his only appearance with the main squad.

On 5 July 2024, García moved abroad to Portuguese Primeira Liga club Gil Vicente FC, signing a three-year contract.

== Career statistics ==
=== Club ===
As of 19 August 2024

Appearances and goals by club, season and competition
| Club | Season | League | | | National cup | | Continental | | Other | | Total | |
| Club | Season | Division | Apps | Goals | Apps | Goals | Apps | Goals | Apps | Goals | Apps | Goals |
|---|---|---|---|---|---|---|---|---|---|---|---|---|
| Trival Valderas | 2019-20 | Tercera División | 18 | 1 | — | | — | | — | | 18 | 1 |
| Getafe B | 2020–21 | Segunda División B | 18 | 0 | — | | — | | — | | 18 | 0 |
| Getafe B | 2021–22 | Tercera División RFEF | 14 | 4 | — | | — | | — | | 14 | 4 |
| Getafe B | 2022–23 | Tercera Federación | 21 | 8 | — | | — | | 5 (Note: Appearances in 2023 Tercera Federación play-offs) | 3 | 26 | 11 |
| Getafe B | 2023–24 | Segunda Federación | 26 | 6 | — | | — | | 2 (Note: Appearances in 2024 Segunda Federación play-offs) | 0 | 28 | 6 |
| Getafe B | Total | | 79 | 18 | 0 | 0 | 0 | 0 | 7 | 3 | 86 | 21 |
| Getafe | 2023–24 | La Liga | 1 | 0 | 0 | 0 | — | | — | | 1 | 0 |
| Gil Vicente | 2024–25 | Primeira Liga | 0 | 0 | 0 | 0 | — | | — | | 0 | 0 |
| Career total | | | 98 | 19 | 0 | 0 | 0 | 0 | 7 | 3 | 105 | 22 |
