= Jordi Martín (footballer, born 2001) =

Spanish footballer

Personal information
- Full name: Jorge Martín Camuñas
- Date of birth: 5 January 2001 (age 25)
- Place of birth: Madrid, Spain
- Height: 1.76 m (5 ft 9 in)
- Position: Midfielder

Team information
- Current team: Eldense

Youth career
- 2009–2010: Parla
- 2010–2012: Getafe
- 2012–2020: Real Madrid

Senior career*
Years	Team	Apps	(Gls)
2019–2022	Real Madrid B	20	(1)
2021	→ Getafe B (loan)	13	(1)
2021–2022	→ Talavera (loan)	14	(0)
2022–2023	RSC Internacional	25	(1)
2023–2024	Getafe B	16	(0)
2023–2024	Getafe	13	(0)
2024–2026	Huesca	47	(2)
2026–	Eldense	0	(0)
- * Club domestic league appearances and goals as of 6 June 2026

Jorge "Jordi" Martín Camuñas (born 5 January 2001) is a Spanish professional footballer who plays for CD Eldense. Mainly a midfielder, he can also play as a winger or a left-back.

== Career ==
Born in Madrid, Martín joined Real Madrid's La Fábrica in 2012, from Getafe CF. After spending the 2019 pre-season with the reserves, he made his senior debut with the side on 25 August of that year, starting and scoring the equalizer in a 1–1 Segunda División B away draw against Las Rozas CF.

Regularly used by manager Raúl in the 2019–20 season, Martín failed to feature in any matches during the first half of the 2020–21 campaign before returning to Geta on 12 January 2021, on loan to the B-team.

On 10 July 2021, Martín was loaned to Primera División RFEF side CF Talavera de la Reina, for one year. Upon returning, he was assigned to RSC Internacional FC – Real Madrid's unofficial farm team – in Tercera Federación.

On 18 August 2023, Martín rejoined Getafe and their B-side, now in the fifth tier. He made his first team debut on 1 November, starting and scoring his side's fourth in a 12–0 away routing of CF Tardienta, for the season's Copa del Rey. He made his La Liga debut on 8 December, starting in a 1–0 home win over Valencia CF.

On 29 August 2024, Martín signed a three-year contract with Segunda División side SD Huesca. Converted into a central midfielder by manager Antonio Hidalgo, he suffered a knee injury in April 2025, and spent nearly eight months sidelined before being declared fit to play in December.

On 29 July 2026, after suffering relegation, Martín agreed to a two-year deal with CD Eldense also in the second division on 29 July of that year.

== Career statistics ==
=== Club ===
As of match played 1 February 2024

Appearances and goals by club, season and competition
Club	Season	League			National cup		Other		Total	
Club	Season	Division	Apps	Goals	Apps	Goals	Apps	Goals	Apps	Goals
Real Madrid Castilla	2019-20	Segunda División B	20	1	—		—		20	1
Getafe B (loan)	2020–21	Segunda División B	13	1	—		—		13	1
Talavera (loan)	2021–22	Primera División RFEF	14	0	2	0	—		16	0
RSC Internacional	2022–23	Tercera Federación	25	1	—		4 (Note: Appearances in 2023 Tercera Federación play-offs)	0	29	1
Getafe B	2023–24	Segunda Federación	12	0	—		—		12	0
Getafe	2023–24	La Liga	5	0	3	1	—		8	1
Career total			89	3	5	1	4	0	98	4
