= Gorka Rivera =

Spanish footballer

Personal information
- Full name: Gorka Rivera Alonso
- Date of birth: 1 August 2004 (age 22)
- Place of birth: Leganés, Spain
- Height: 1.84 m (6 ft 0 in)
- Position: Left back

Team information
- Current team: Unionistas (on loan from Getafe)

Youth career
- 2010–2013: Movila
- 2013–2018: Real Madrid
- 2018–2020: Leganés
- 2020–2021: Getafe

Senior career*
Years	Team	Apps	(Gls)
2021–2026	Getafe B	85	(2)
2023–	Getafe	2	(0)
2026–	→ Unionistas (loan)	0	(0)
- * Club domestic league appearances and goals as of 7 May 2026

Gorka Rivera Alonso (born 1 August 2004) is a Spanish professional footballer who plays as a left back for Unionistas de Salamanca CF, on loan from Getafe CF.

== Career ==
Born in Leganés, Community of Madrid, Rivera joined Real Madrid's La Fábrica in 2013, from FC Movila. He left the club in 2018, and subsequently represented CD Leganés and Getafe CF.

Rivera made his senior debut with the reserves on 5 September 2021, starting in a 1–1 Tercera División RFEF away draw against AD Alcorcón B. He scored his first goal on 11 February 2023, netting the B's first in a 3–3 home draw against CD Canillas.

Rivera made his first team – and La Liga – debut on 20 August 2023, coming on as a late substitute for Damián Suárez in a 3–0 away loss to Girona FC. He suffered a knee injury shortly after, but still renewed his contract until 2029 on 18 September.

On 5 August 2026, Rivera was loaned to Primera Federación side Unionistas de Salamanca CF for the season.

== Career statistics ==
=== Club ===
As of match played 2 January 2024

Appearances and goals by club, season and competition
Club	Season	League			National cup		Continental		Other		Total	
Club	Season	Division	Apps	Goals	Apps	Goals	Apps	Goals	Apps	Goals	Apps	Goals
Getafe B	2021–22	Tercera División RFEF	21	0	—		—		—		21	0
Getafe B	2022–23	Tercera Federación	21	1	—		—		5 (Note: Appearances in 2023 Tercera Federación play-offs)	0	26	1
Getafe B	2023–24	Segunda Federación	1	0	—		—		—		1	0
Getafe B	Total		43	1	0	0	0	0	5	0	48	1
Getafe	2023–24	La Liga	1	0	0	0	—		—		1	0
Career total			44	1	0	0	0	0	5	0	49	1
