= 2023–24 Getafe CF season =

Getafe CF
2023–24 season
- Owner: Ángel Torres
- President: Ángel Torres
- Head coach: José Bordalás
- Stadium: Coliseum Alfonso Pérez (until 4 October); Coliseum (from 4 October)
- La Liga: 12th
- Copa del Rey: Round of 16
- Top goalscorer: League: Borja Mayoral (15); All: Borja Mayoral (17)
- Average home league attendance: 11,456
Home colours	Away colours	Third colours

The 2023–24 season was Getafe Club de Fútbol's 41st season in existence and seventh consecutive season in La Liga. They also competed in the Copa del Rey.

== Players ==
=== First-team squad ===
As of 1 February 2024.

Note: Flags indicate national team as defined under FIFA eligibility rules; some limited exceptions apply. Players may hold more than one non-FIFA nationality.

No.	Pos.	Nation	Player
1	GK	BRA	Daniel Fuzato (on loan from Ibiza)
2	DF	TOG	Djené (captain)
3	DF	ARG	Fabrizio Angileri
4	DF	URU	Gastón Álvarez
5	MF	ESP	Luis Milla
6	DF	POR	Domingos Duarte
7	FW	ESP	Jaime Mata
8	MF	URU	Mauro Arambarri
9	MF	ESP	Óscar Rodríguez (on loan from Sevilla)
11	MF	ESP	Carles Aleñá
12	FW	ENG	Mason Greenwood (on loan from Manchester United)

No.	Pos.	Nation	Player
13	GK	ESP	David Soria
14	FW	ESP	Juanmi Latasa (on loan from Real Madrid)
15	DF	PAR	Omar Alderete
16	DF	ESP	Diego Rico (on loan from Real Sociedad)
18	DF	ESP	José Ángel Carmona (on loan from Sevilla)
19	FW	ESP	Borja Mayoral
20	MF	SRB	Nemanja Maksimović
21	DF	ESP	Juan Iglesias
24	MF	GUI	Ilaix Moriba (on loan from RB Leipzig)
25	MF	ESP	Jesús Santiago

=== Reserve team ===
Note: Flags indicate national team as defined under FIFA eligibility rules; some limited exceptions apply. Players may hold more than one non-FIFA nationality.

No.	Pos.	Nation	Player
26	MF	IRL	John Joe Patrick Finn
27	DF	ESP	Gorka Rivera
28	MF	ESP	Santi García
29	MF	ESP	Facu Esnáider

No.	Pos.	Nation	Player
30	DF	FRA	Nabil Aberdin
32	FW	ESP	Jordi Martín
35	GK	ESP	Jorge Benito

=== Out on loan ===
Note: Flags indicate national team as defined under FIFA eligibility rules; some limited exceptions apply. Players may hold more than one non-FIFA nationality.

No.	Pos.	Nation	Player
—	DF	ARG	Jonathan Silva (at Albacete until 30 June 2024)
—	MF	GHA	Sabit Abdulai (at Lugo until 30 June 2024)
—	FW	ESP	Darío Poveda (at Cartagena until 30 June 2024)

No.	Pos.	Nation	Player
—	FW	TUR	Enes Ünal (at Bournemouth until 30 June 2024)
—	FW	HON	Choco Lozano (at Almería until 30 June 2024)

== Transfers ==
=== In ===
Pos.	Player	Transferred from	Fee	Date	Source
DF	(Uruguay) Gastón Álvarez	(Uruguay) Boston River	Undisclosed	1 July 2023	
MF	(Spain) Portu	(Spain) Real Sociedad	€3,500,000	1 July 2023	
DF	(Paraguay) Omar Alderete	(Germany) Hertha BSC	€4,000,000	1 July 2023	
FW	(Honduras) Anthony Lozano	(Spain) Cádiz	Free	1 July 2023	
MF	(Spain) Sergi Altimira	(Spain) Sabadell	Free	6 July 2023	
DF	(Spain) José Ángel Carmona	(Spain) Sevilla	Loan	20 July 2023	
MF	(Spain) Óscar	(Spain) Sevilla	Loan	1 September 2023	
FW	(England) Mason Greenwood	(England) Manchester United	Loan	1 September 2023	
DF	(Spain) Diego Rico	(Spain) Real Sociedad	Loan	1 September 2023	
MF	(Guinea) Ilaix Moriba	(Germany) RB Leipzig	Loan	8 January 2024	
MF	(Spain) Jesús Santiago	(Spain) Valencia	Undisclosed	10 January 2024	
FW	(Spain) Darío Poveda	(Spain) Leganés	Loan return	1 February 2024	

=== Out ===
Pos.	Player	Transferred to	Fee	Date	Source
FW	(Morocco) Munir El Haddadi	Released		1 July 2023	
GK	(Spain) Kiko Casilla	Released		1 July 2023	
FW	(Spain) Darío Poveda	(Spain) Leganés	Loan	3 July 2023	
MF	(Czech Republic) Jakub Jankto	(Italy) Cagliari	Undisclosed	15 July 2023	
FW	(Scotland) Jack Harper	(Spain) Marbella FC	Free	26 July 2023	
DF	(Argentina) Jonathan Silva	(Spain) Albacete	Loan	10 August 2023	
MF	(Spain) Sergi Altimira	(Spain) Real Betis	€2,000,000	11 August 2023	
MF	(Spain) Portu	(Spain) Girona	€2,000,000	1 September 2023	
FW	(Honduras) Anthony Lozano	(Spain) Almería	Loan	1 February 2024	
FW	(Spain) Darío Poveda	(Spain) Cartagena	Loan	1 February 2024	
DF	(Serbia) Stefan Mitrović	(Belgium) Gent	Undisclosed	1 February 2024	
FW	(Turkey) Enes Ünal	(England) Bournemouth	Loan	1 February 2024	
DF	(Uruguay) Damián Suárez	Released		5 February 2024	

Notes
1.Exercised buy option.

== Pre-season and friendlies ==
Win Draw Loss Fixtures

14 July 2023 Friendly	Getafe	3–0	Bradford City	Oliva
19:00	Mayoral 2'; Iglesias 36'; Altimira 71'	Report		Stadium: Oliva Nova Golf & Beach Resort Campo 1 Referee: Sergio Escriche Guzmán

19 July 2023 Friendly	Getafe	1–0	Leganés	Getafe
19:15 UTC+2	Mata 45'			Stadium: Ciudad Deportiva de Getafe – Campo 1

22 July 2023 Friendly	Getafe	2–1	Independiente del Valle	Las Rozas
20:00 UTC+2	Mayoral 61'; Seoane 84'		Rodríguez 79'	Stadium: Ciudad del Fútbol de Las Rozas

26 July 2023 Friendly	Getafe	0–1	Reims	Orihuela Costa
20:00 UTC+2				Stadium: Real Club de Golf Campoamor Campo 1

2 August 2023 Friendly	Granada	2–1	Getafe	Puertollano
19:45 UTC+2				Stadium: Estadio Ciudad de Puertollano

5 August 2023 Friendly	Getafe	4–1	Vitesse	Getafe
21:00 UTC+2	Latasa 23'; Suárez (red card) 41'; Aleñá 68'; Mayoral 73'; Altimira 90+1'		Hamulić 17'; Boutrah (red card) 41'; Manhoef (yellow card) 68'	Stadium: Coliseum Alfonso Pérez; Attendance: 3,000; Referee: Miguel Ángel Ortiz Arias

== Competitions ==
=== Overall record ===
Competition	First match	Last match	Starting round	Final position	Record							
Competition	First match	Last match	Starting round	Final position	Pld	W	D	L	GF	GA	GD	Win %
La Liga	13 August 2023	26 May 2024	Matchday 1	12th	38	10	13	15	42	54	−12	26.32
Copa del Rey	1 November 2023	16 January 2024	First round	Round of 16	4	3	0	1	16	4	+12	75.00
Total					42	13	13	16	58	58	+0	30.95

Source: Soccerway

=== La Liga ===
==== League table ====
Pos	Team	Pld	W	D	L	GF	GA	GD	Pts
10	Alavés	38	12	10	16	36	46	−10	46
11	Osasuna	38	12	9	17	45	56	−11	45
12	Getafe	38	10	13	15	42	54	−12	43
13	Celta Vigo	38	10	11	17	46	57	−11	41 (Note: Celta Vigo finished ahead of Sevilla on head-to-head points: Celta Vigo 1–1 Sevilla, Sevilla 1–2 Celta Vigo.)
14	Sevilla	38	10	11	17	48	54	−6	41

Source: LaLiga EA Sports
Rules for classification: 1) Points; 2) Head-to-head points; 3) Head-to-head goal difference; 4) Goal difference; 5) Goals scored; 6) Fair-play points
(Note: Head-to-head record is used only after all the matches between the teams in question have been played)

==== Results summary ====
Overall								Home						Away					
Pld	W	D	L	GF	GA	GD	Pts	W	D	L	GF	GA	GD	W	D	L	GF	GA	GD
38	10	13	15	42	54	−12	43	8	5	6	20	22	−2	2	8	9	22	32	−10

Source: La Liga

==== Results by round ====
Round	1	2	3	4	5	6	7	8	9	10	11	12	13	14	15	16	17	18	19	20	21	22	23	24	25	26	27	28	29	30	31	32	33	34	35	36	37	38
Ground	H	A	H	A	H	A	A	H	A	H	A	H	A	H	A	H	A	A	H	H	A	H	A	H	A	A	H	A	H	H	A	H	A	H	A	H	A	H
Result	D	L	W	L	W	L	D	D	D	D	D	W	D	W	L	W	W	D	L	L	L	W	D	W	D	L	D	L	W	L	D	D	W	L	L	L	L	L
Position	13	17	11	14	9	13	11	11	11	11	13	11	11	8	10	9	8	8	8	10	10	10	10	10	10	10	11	12	10	11	10	10	10	10	10	10	12	12

Source: La Liga
A = Away; H = Home; W = Win; D = Draw; L = Loss

==== Matches ====
The league fixtures were unveiled on 22 June 2023.

13 August 2023 1	Getafe	0–0	Barcelona	Getafe
21:30 CEST (UTC+2)	Mitrović (yellow card) 15'; Mata (yellow card) 31' (yellow-red card) 57'; Aleñá (yellow card) 38'; Suárez (yellow card) 82'; Lozano (yellow card) 84'; Djené (yellow card) 90+1'; Portu (yellow card) 90+15'	Report	Raphinha (yellow card) 38', (red card) 42'; Gavi (yellow card) 90+11'	Stadium: Coliseum Alfonso Pérez; Attendance: 13,410; Referee: César Soto Grado

20 August 2023 2	Girona	3–0	Getafe	Girona
19:00 CEST (UTC+2)	Herrera 12'; Gazzaniga (yellow card) 45+3'; Stuani 55', 65'; Martín (yellow card) 62'	Report	Latasa (yellow card) 7'; Mayoral (yellow card) 28'; Mitrović (yellow card) 29'; Djené (yellow card) 50'; Duarte (yellow card) 90+3'	Stadium: Montilivi; Attendance: 11,784; Referee: Jorge Figueroa Vázquez

28 August 2023 3	Getafe	1–0	Alavés	Getafe
19:30 CEST (UTC+2)	Duarte (yellow card) 72'; Mayoral 84' (pen.)	Report	Abqar (yellow card) 83'; Alkain (yellow card) 83'	Stadium: Coliseum Alfonso Pérez; Attendance: 11,023; Referee: Juan Martínez Munuera

2 September 2023 4	Real Madrid	2–1	Getafe	Madrid
16:15 CEST (UTC+2)	Joselu 47'; Rüdiger (yellow card) 45+3'; Kroos (yellow card) 51'; Bellingham 90+5'	Report	Latasa (yellow card) 7'; Mayoral 11', (yellow card) 87'; Soria (yellow card) 68'; Iglesias (yellow card) 81'; Álvarez (yellow card) 83'; Carmona (yellow card) 90+4'	Stadium: Santiago Bernabéu; Attendance: 66,747; Referee: Mario Melero López

17 September 2023 5	Getafe	3–2	Osasuna	Getafe
14:00 CEST (UTC+2)	Duarte (yellow card) 26'; Mitrović 36', (yellow card) 90+3'; Latasa (yellow card) 41'; Carmona 51', (yellow card) 60'; Soria (yellow card) 55'; Maksimović 86'; Djené (yellow card) 90'; Angileri (red card) 90+2'	Report	Ávila (yellow card) 38'; Muñoz 45', (yellow card) 88'; Budimir 57'	Stadium: Coliseum Alfonso Pérez; Attendance: 9,908; Referee: Alejandro Hernández Hernández

24 September 2023 6	Real Sociedad	4–3	Getafe	San Sebastián
14:00 CEST (UTC+2)	Kubo 2'; Méndez (yellow card) 45+1', (goal) 66'; Muñoz (yellow card) 45+3'; Oyarzabal 61' (pen.), 88'	Report	Rico (yellow card) 19'; Aleñá 39'; Mayoral 45+5' (pen.); Suárez (yellow card) 49'; Latasa 90+2'	Stadium: Reale Arena; Attendance: 29,568; Referee: Juan Luis Pulido Santana

27 September 2023 7	Athletic Bilbao	2–2	Getafe	Bilbao
19:00 CEST (UTC+2)	Paredes (yellow card) 2'; Berchiche 6'; Sancet (red card) 45+1'; Guruzeta (yellow card) 58'; I. Williams 62', (yellow card) 90+6'; Yeray (yellow card) 90+2'; R. García (yellow card) 90+6'	Report	Suárez (yellow card) 6'; Álvarez 51'; Latasa 83'; Angileri (yellow card) 83'; Óscar (yellow card) 90+2'; Djené (yellow card) 90+4'; Mata (yellow card) 90+10'	Stadium: San Mamés; Attendance: 43,091; Referee: Isidro Díaz de Mera Escuderos

30 September 2023 8	Getafe	0–0	Villarreal	Getafe
14:00 CEST (UTC+2)	Óscar (yellow card) 30'; Greenwood (yellow card) 53'	Report	Pedraza (yellow card) 5'; Baena (red card) 24'; Jörgensen (yellow card) 62'; Pino (yellow card) 67'; Femenía (yellow card) 74'	Stadium: Coliseum Alfonso Pérez; Attendance: 11,255; Referee: Mateo Busquets Ferrer

8 October 2023 9	Celta Vigo	2–2	Getafe	Vigo
18:30 CEST (UTC+2)	Aspas (penalty missed) 14'; Bamba 24'; Larsen 42'; Beltrán (yellow card) 53'	Report	Mayoral 2'; Duarte (yellow card) 9' (yellow-red card) 30'; Maksimović (yellow card) 13'; Djené (yellow card) 27'; Carmona (yellow card) 30'; Mata (yellow card) 31'; Greenwood 33'; Aleñá (yellow card) 38'; Rico (yellow card) 81'; Arambarri (yellow card) 90+6'	Stadium: Balaídos; Attendance: 17,953; Referee: José María Sánchez Martínez

21 October 2023 10	Getafe	1–1	Real Betis	Getafe
16:15 CEST (UTC+2)	Mayoral 17'; Rico (yellow card) 38'; Arambarri (yellow card) 38'; Álvarez (yellow card) 43'; Carmona (yellow card) 86'; Maksimović (yellow card) 89'	Report	Roca 1'; Guardado (yellow card) 34'; Pezzella (yellow card) 41'	Stadium: Coliseum; Attendance: 13,926; Referee: César Soto Grado

28 October 2023 11	Mallorca	0–0	Getafe	Palma
18:30 CEST (UTC+2)		Report	Mata (yellow card) 75'	Stadium: Estadi Mallorca Son Moix; Attendance: 15,310; Referee: Pablo González Fuertes

6 November 2023 12	Getafe	1–0	Cádiz	Getafe
21:00 CET (UTC+1)	Djené (yellow card) 13' (yellow-red card) 44'; Alderete (yellow card) 23'; Aleñá (yellow card) 58'; Suárez (yellow card) 59'; Greenwood (yellow card) 66'; Mayoral 76'; Álvarez (yellow card) 89'	Report	Alcaraz (yellow card) 45+4'	Stadium: Coliseum; Attendance: 9,853; Referee: Ricardo de Burgos Bengoetxea

11 November 2023 13	Granada	1–1	Getafe	Granada
18:30 CET (UTC+1)	Boyé (yellow card) 39'; Villar 45+4'; Neva (yellow card) 56'; Zaragoza (yellow card) 72'; Manafá (yellow card) 80'	Report	Mayoral 2'; Aleñá (yellow card) 41'; Óscar (yellow card) 84'	Stadium: Nuevo Los Cármenes; Attendance: 18,103; Referee: Alejandro Muñiz Ruiz

25 November 2023 14	Getafe	2–1	Almería	Getafe
18:30 CET (UTC+1)	Rico (yellow card) 24'; Alderete (yellow card) 28'; Greenwood 33'; Mayoral 45'	Report	Ramazani 7', (yellow card) 63'; González (yellow card) 52'; Baptistão (yellow card) 60'; Baba (yellow card) 64'	Stadium: Coliseum; Attendance: 10,906; Referee: Alejandro Hernández Hernández

1 December 2023 15	Las Palmas	2–0	Getafe	Las Palmas
20:00 WET (UTC±0)	Araujo 43'; Herrera 90+2'	Report	Óscar (yellow card) 11'; Alderete (red card) 48'; Suárez (yellow card) 55'; Rico (yellow card) 69'; Milla (yellow card) 70'; Angileri (yellow card) 90+1'	Stadium: Estadio Gran Canaria; Attendance: 21,912; Referee: Mateo Busquets Ferrer

8 December 2023 16	Getafe	1–0	Valencia	Getafe
21:00 CET (UTC+1)	Milla (yellow card) 57'; Djené (yellow card) 62'; Mayoral 87'; Duarte (red card) 90+3'	Report	Correia (yellow card) 42'; Gabriel (yellow card) 43' (yellow-red card) 50'; Guerra (red card) 88'; Foulquier (yellow card) 90+3'	Stadium: Coliseum; Attendance: 11,515; Referee: Guillermo Cuadra Fernández

16 December 2023 17	Sevilla	0–3	Getafe	Seville
18:30 CET (UTC+1)	Dmitrović (yellow card) 4'; Gudelj (yellow card) 77'; Rakitić (yellow card) 86'	Report	Mayoral 5' (pen.); Milla (yellow card) 12'; Álvarez (yellow card) 24'; Mata 37', (yellow card) 90+4'; Greenwood 80' (pen.)	Stadium: Ramón Sánchez Pizjuán; Attendance: 30,005; Referee: Juan Luis Pulido Santana

19 December 2023 18	Atlético Madrid	3–3	Getafe	Madrid
21:30 CET (UTC+1)	Savić (yellow card) 15' (yellow-red card) 38'; Griezmann 44', 69' (pen.); Morata 63'; Hermoso (yellow card) 90'	Report	Milla (yellow card) 52'; Mayoral 53', 90+3' (pen.); Suárez (yellow card) 68'; Óscar (yellow card) 82', (goal) 87'	Stadium: Cívitas Metropolitano; Attendance: 46,401; Referee: José Luis Munuera Montero

2 January 2024 19	Getafe	0–2	Rayo Vallecano	Getafe
17:00 CET (UTC+1)	Djené (yellow card) 19'; Latasa (yellow card) 23' (yellow-red card) 40'; Greenwood (red card) 50'; Mata (yellow card) 54'; Suárez (yellow card) 69', (red card) 70'; Alderete (yellow card) 82'	Report	Espino (yellow card) 4'; Pérez (yellow card) 39'; Camello 45+1', 47'; Ciss (yellow card) 90'	Stadium: Coliseum; Attendance: 11,204; Referee: Jorge Figueroa Vázquez
Note: Suárez was sent off after being substituted out of the match.

21 January 2024 21	Osasuna	3–2	Getafe	Pamplona
14:00 CET (UTC+1)	Ra. García 9', (yellow card) 26'; Gómez (yellow card) 29'; Muñoz 31'; D. García (yellow card) 76'; Areso 80'; Ibáñez (yellow card) 80'; Cruz (yellow card) 89'	Report	Milla (yellow card) 39'; Mayoral 64'; Maksimović 68', (yellow card) 86'; Iglesias (yellow card) 77'; Carmona (yellow card) 90+5'	Stadium: El Sadar; Attendance: 18,811; Referee: José María Sánchez Martínez

29 January 2024 22	Getafe	2–0	Granada	Getafe
21:00 CET (UTC+1)	Rico (yellow card) 13'; Greenwood 21', (yellow card) 90'; Mayoral 36'	Report	Uzuni (penalty missed) 59'; Méndez (yellow card) 87'	Stadium: Coliseum; Attendance: 10,382; Referee: Víctor García Verdura

1 February 2024 20	Getafe	0–2	Real Madrid	Getafe
21:00 CET (UTC+1)	Djené (yellow card) 26'	Report	Joselu 14', 56'; Mendy (yellow card) 30'; Tchouaméni (yellow card) 90+2'	Stadium: Coliseum; Attendance: 15,264; Referee: Ricardo de Burgos Bengoetxea
Note: The match date was pushed back due to Real Madrid's involvement in the Supercopa de España.

4 February 2024 23	Real Betis	1–1	Getafe	Seville
18:30 CET (UTC+1)	Papastathopoulos (yellow card) 19'; Isco 35' (pen.), (yellow card) 43'; Miranda (yellow card) 40'; Diao (yellow card) 41'; Altimira (yellow card) 52'; Cardoso (yellow card) 60'; Silva (yellow card) 89'	Report	Greenwood 8' (pen.); Álvarez (yellow card) 45'; Santiago (yellow card) 62'; Djené (yellow card) 64'; Soria (yellow card) 68'	Stadium: Benito Villamarín; Attendance: 53,336; Referee: Juan Luis Pulido Santana

11 February 2024 24	Getafe	3–2	Celta Vigo	Getafe
14:00 CET (UTC+1)	Mayoral 41'; Mata 45+2', 89'; Greenwood (yellow card) 62'	Report	Tapia (yellow card) 50'; Larsen 71'; Ristić (yellow card) 82'; Allende 85'	Stadium: Coliseum; Attendance: 11,502; Referee: Alejandro Hernández Hernández

16 February 2024 25	Villarreal	1–1	Getafe	Villarreal
21:00 CET (UTC+1)	Moreno 56'	Report	Maksimović 24'; Iglesias (yellow card) 38'	Stadium: Estadio de la Cerámica; Attendance: 16,869; Referee: Javier Alberola Rojas

24 February 2024 26	Barcelona	4–0	Getafe	Barcelona
16:15 CET (UTC+1)	Raphinha 20'; Gündoğan (yellow card) 37'; Félix 53'; De Jong 61'; López 90+1'	Report	Alderete (yellow card) 37'; Djené (yellow card) 48'; Rico (yellow card) 50'; Santiago (yellow card) 90'	Stadium: Estadi Olímpic Lluís Companys; Attendance: 36,803; Referee: Alejandro Muñiz Ruiz

2 March 2024 27	Getafe	3–3	Las Palmas	Getafe
18:30 CET (UTC+1)	Carmona (yellow card) 7'; Mata 11', (yellow card) 67'; Greenwood 14', (yellow card) 43'; Maksimović 45'; Moriba (yellow card) 60'	Report	Sandro 35'; S. Cardona 50'; Munir 57'; Muñoz (yellow card) 67'	Stadium: Coliseum; Attendance: 7,623; Referee: Pablo González Fuertes

9 March 2024 28	Valencia	1–0	Getafe	Valencia
14:00 CET (UTC+1)	Duro 40'; Pepelu (yellow card) 67'; Guillamón (yellow card) 90'	Report	Moriba (yellow card) 43'; Carmona (yellow card) 78'; Djené (yellow card) 82'	Stadium: Mestalla; Attendance: 37,961; Referee: Juan Luis Pulido Santana

16 March 2024 29	Getafe	1–0	Girona	Getafe
18:30 CET (UTC+1)	Alderete (yellow card) 11'; Santiago 33'; Milla (yellow card) 52'; Óscar (yellow card) 90'; Carmona (yellow card) 90+4'	Report	Sávio (yellow card) 9'; A. García (yellow card) 15'; Portu (yellow card) 39'; Stuani (yellow card) 86'	Stadium: Coliseum; Attendance: 12,912; Referee: José Luis Munuera Montero

30 March 2024 30	Getafe	0–1	Sevilla	Getafe
14:00 CET (UTC+1)	Óscar (yellow card) 43'; Rico (yellow card) 90'; Mata (yellow card) 90+4'; Aleñá (yellow card) 90+7'	Report	Ramos 5'; Salas (yellow card) 21'; Soumaré (yellow card) 36'; Gudelj (yellow card) 74'; Romero (yellow card) 88'; Acuña (yellow card) 88'	Stadium: Coliseum; Attendance: 10,139; Referee: Javier Iglesias Villanueva

13 April 2024 31	Rayo Vallecano	0–0	Getafe	Madrid
16:15 CEST (UTC+2)	Camello (yellow card) 7'; Palazón (yellow card) 16'; Mumin (yellow card) 80'; Valentín (yellow card) 90+2'	Report	Iglesias (yellow card) 17'; Mata (yellow card) 39'; Álvarez (yellow card) 51'; Latasa (yellow card) 80'; Moriba (yellow card) 81'; Rodríguez (yellow card) 85'	Stadium: Campo de Fútbol de Vallecas; Attendance: 12,868; Referee: Jorge Figueroa Vázquez

21 April 2024 32	Getafe	1–1	Real Sociedad	Getafe
14:00 CEST (UTC+2)	Latasa 29'	Report	Barrenetxea 13'; Merino (yellow card) 39'; Elustondo (yellow card) 90+5'	Stadium: Coliseum; Attendance: 12,228; Referee: Víctor García Verdura

27 April 2024 33	Almería	1–3	Getafe	Almería
16:15 CEST (UTC+2)	Montes (yellow card) 38'; Lozano 41'; Embarba (yellow card) 50'; Robertone (yellow card) 55'; Viera (yellow card) 86' (yellow-red card) 90+1'	Report	Alderete (yellow card) 26'; Greenwood 27', 48', (yellow card) 60'; Mata 61'; Martín (yellow card) 86'; Santiago (yellow card) 90+2'	Stadium: Power Horse Stadium; Attendance: 7,874; Referee: Guillermo Cuadra Fernández

3 May 2024 34	Getafe	0–2	Athletic Bilbao	Getafe
21:00 CEST (UTC+2)	Greenwood (penalty missed) 88'	Report	I. Williams 27', 51'; Yeray (red card) 58'; Paredes (yellow card) 72' (yellow-red card) 79'	Stadium: Coliseum; Attendance: 12,149; Referee: Jesús Gil Manzano

12 May 2024 35	Cádiz	1–0	Getafe	Cádiz
14:00 CEST (UTC+2)	Alcaraz 35' (pen.); Sobrino (yellow card) 39'; Chust (yellow card) 48'; Zaldúa (yellow card) 61'; Alejo (yellow card) 90+3'; J. Hernández (yellow card) 90+4'	Report	Djené (yellow card) 34'; Óscar (yellow card) 57'	Stadium: Nuevo Mirandilla; Attendance: 16,592; Referee: Ricardo de Burgos Bengoetxea

15 May 2024 36	Getafe	0–3	Atlético Madrid	Getafe
22:00 CEST (UTC+2)	Rico (yellow card) 14'; Alderete (yellow card) 55'; Santiago (yellow card) 88'; Álvarez (yellow card) 90+1'	Report	Witsel (yellow card) 17'; Griezmann 27', 42', 51'; Giménez (yellow card) 77'; Hermoso (yellow card) 88'	Stadium: Coliseum; Attendance: 13,027; Referee: Mario Melero López

18 May 2024 37	Alavés	1–0	Getafe	Vitoria-Gasteiz
21:00 CEST (UTC+2)	Vicente 12'; Simeone (yellow card) 15'; Benavídez (yellow card) 37'; Tenaglia (yellow card) 50'; Blanco (yellow card) 80'; Omorodion (yellow card) 90+5'	Report	Carmona (yellow card) 11'; Maksimović (yellow card) 17'; Rico (yellow card) 45'; Latasa (yellow card) 71'; Aleñá (yellow card) 77'; Moriba (yellow card) 78' (yellow-red card) 90+5'	Stadium: Mendizorrotza; Attendance: 18,709; Referee: Jorge Figueroa Vázquez

26 May 2024 38	Getafe	1–2	Mallorca	Getafe
14:00 CEST (UTC+2)	Álvarez 48'	Report	Vidal (yellow card) 30'; Rodríguez (yellow card) 73'; Muriqi 90'; Maffeo 90+3'	Stadium: Coliseum; Attendance: 9,545; Referee: Víctor García Verdura

=== Copa del Rey ===
1 November 2023 First round	Tardienta	0–12	Getafe	Huesca
18:30 CET (UTC+1)	Duato (yellow card) 88'	Report	Patrick 7'; Greenwood 15', 54'; Lozano 30'; Martín 33'; Óscar 35', 56', 63'; Duarte 68'; Latasa 73'; Mayoral 78', 85'	Stadium: El Alcoraz; Attendance: 1,200; Referee: Víctor García Verdura
Note: The match was played at the El Alcoraz in Huesca, instead of Tardienta's regular stadium, the Campo Municipal de Deportes Santa Quiteria in Tardienta, which did not meet the broadcasting requirements.

5 December 2023 Second round	Atzeneta	1–2	Getafe	Atzeneta d'Albaida
19:00 CET (UTC+1)	Seguí 56'; Martí (yellow card) 73'; Domínguez (yellow card) 74'	Report	Martín (yellow card) 3'; Mitrović (yellow card) 20'; Aleñá (yellow card) 47'; Latasa 53', 74'; Duarte (yellow card) 86'	Stadium: El Regit; Attendance: 5,000; Referee: José Luis Munuera Montero

6 January 2024 Round of 32	Espanyol	0–1	Getafe	Cornellà de Llobregat
17:00 CET (UTC+1)	El Hilali (yellow card) 75'	Report	Óscar (yellow card) 62'; Álvarez (yellow card) 76'; Milla 87'	Stadium: Stage Front Stadium; Attendance: 15,197; Referee: Mario Melero López

16 January 2024 Round of 16	Getafe	1–3	Sevilla	Getafe
20:00 CET (UTC+1)	Mata 23', (yellow card) 80'	Report	Ramos 8'; Romero 48', 55'; Nianzou (yellow card) 74'; Marcão (yellow card) 90+6'	Stadium: Coliseum; Attendance: 12,581; Referee: Alejandro Muñiz Ruiz
Note: Mata was booked after being substituted out of the match.

== Statistics ==
=== Appearances and goals ===
Last updated 6 January 2023

No.	Pos	Nat	Player	Total		La Liga		Copa del Rey	
No.	Pos	Nat	Player	Apps	Goals	Apps	Goals	Apps	Goals
Goalkeepers
1	GK	(Brazil) BRA	Daniel Fuzato	2	0	0	0	2	0
13	GK	(Spain) ESP	David Soria	20	0	19	0	1	0
Defenders
2	DF	(Togo) TOG	Djené	16	0	14+2	0	0	0
3	DF	(Argentina) ARG	Fabrizio Angileri	6	0	1+4	0	1	0
4	DF	(Uruguay) URU	Gastón Álvarez	19	1	16+1	1	1+1	0
6	DF	(Portugal) POR	Domingos Duarte	13	1	9+2	0	2	1
15	DF	(Paraguay) PAR	Omar Alderete	16	0	7+6	0	3	0
16	DF	(Spain) ESP	Diego Rico	16	0	14	0	1+1	0
18	DF	(Spain) ESP	José Ángel Carmona	15	1	7+6	1	1+1	0
21	DF	(Spain) ESP	Juan Iglesias	16	0	8+6	0	2	0
22	DF	(Uruguay) URU	Damián Suárez	16	0	14+1	0	1	0
23	DF	(Serbia) SRB	Stefan Mitrović	14	1	9+2	1	1+2	0
27	DF	(Spain) ESP	Gorka Rivera	1	0	0+1	0	0	0
Midfielders
5	MF	(Spain) ESP	Luis Milla	11	1	7+2	0	2	1
8	MF	(Uruguay) URU	Mauro Arambarri	7	0	3+4	0	0	0
9	MF	(Spain) ESP	Óscar Rodríguez	15	4	2+10	1	2+1	3
11	MF	(Spain) ESP	Carles Aleñá	17	1	7+8	1	2	0
20	MF	(Serbia) SRB	Nemanja Maksimović	21	1	19	1	1+1	0
26	MF	(Republic of Ireland) IRL	John Patrick	1	1	0	0	1	1
28	MF	(Spain) ESP	Santi García	1	0	0+1	0	0	0
32	MF	(Spain) ESP	Jorge Martín	4	1	1+1	0	2	1
Forwards
7	FW	(Spain) ESP	Jaime Mata	19	1	11+6	1	1+1	0
10	FW	(Turkey) TUR	Enes Ünal	2	0	0+1	0	0+1	0
12	FW	(England) ENG	Mason Greenwood	17	5	12+3	3	2	2
14	FW	(Spain) ESP	Juanmi Latasa	22	5	11+8	2	2+1	3
17	FW	(Honduras) HON	Choco Lozano	7	1	0+6	0	1	1
19	FW	(Spain) ESP	Borja Mayoral	22	14	18+1	12	1+2	2
Players transferred out during the season
9	FW	(Spain) ESP	Portu	3	0	0+3	0	0	0

=== Goalscorers ===
Position	Players	LaLiga	Copa del Rey	Total
FW	(Spain) Borja Mayoral	15	2	17
FW	(England) Mason Greenwood	8	2	10
FW	(Spain) Jaime Mata	5	1	6
FW	(Spain) Juanmi Latasa	2	3	5
MF	(Spain) Óscar Rodríguez	2	3	5
MF	(Serbia) Nemanja Maksimović	4	0	4
DF	(Uruguay) Gastón Álvarez	2	0	2
MF	(Spain) Carles Aleñá	1	0	1
DF	(Spain) José Ángel Carmona	1	0	1
DF	(Portugal) Domingos Duarte	0	1	1
FW	(Honduras) Anthony Lozano	0	1	1
MF	(Spain) Jordi Martín	0	1	1
MF	(Spain) Luis Milla	0	1	1
MF	(Republic of Ireland) John Patrick	0	1	1
MF	(Spain) Yellu Santiago	1	0	1
