= Juanmi Latasa =

Spanish footballer (born 2001)

Personal information
- Full name: Juan Miguel Latasa Fernández Layos
- Date of birth: 23 March 2001 (age 25)
- Place of birth: Madrid, Spain
- Height: 1.92 m (6 ft 4 in)
- Position: Forward

Team information
- Current team: Valladolid
- Number: 9

Youth career
- 2013–2016: Unión Adarve
- 2016–2022: Real Madrid

Senior career*
Years	Team	Apps	(Gls)
2019–2022	Real Madrid B	50	(17)
2022–2024	Real Madrid	1	(0)
2022–2024	→ Getafe (loan)	50	(3)
2024–	Valladolid	66	(10)

International career
2019	Spain U19	3	(0)
2019	Spain U20	4	(2)
2023	Spain U21	1	(0)
- * Club domestic league appearances and goals as of 31 May 2026

Juan Miguel "Juanmi" Latasa Fernández Layos (born 23 March 2001) is a Spanish professional footballer who plays as a forward for Segunda División club Real Valladolid.

== Club career ==
=== Real Madrid ===
Latasa made his debut for Real Madrid in a 1–1 draw with Cádiz on 15 May 2022.

==== Loan to Getafe ====
On 26 August 2022, Latasa joined Getafe on a season long loan with a purchase option included. Real Madrid would keep the right of first refusal and a percentage of a possible future sale if he ends up joining Getafe permanently. On 2 July 2023, Getafe extended the loan deal of Latasa for one more season until the end of the 2023–24 season.

=== Valladolid ===
On 14 August 2024, Real Valladolid announced the signing of Latasa on a five-year contract.

== Career statistics ==
=== Club ===
As of match played 15 May 2024

Appearances and goals by club, season and competition
Club	Season	League			Copa del Rey		Total	
Club	Season	Division	Apps	Goals	Apps	Goals	Apps	Goals
Real Madrid Castilla	2019–20	Segunda División B	5	0	–		5	0
Real Madrid Castilla	2020–21	Segunda División B	16	5	–		16	5
Real Madrid Castilla	2021–22	Primera División RFEF	30	12	–		30	12
Real Madrid Castilla	Total		51	17	0	0	51	17
Real Madrid	2021–22	La Liga	1	0	0	0	1	0
Getafe (loan)	2022–23	La Liga	18	1	3	1	21	2
Getafe (loan)	2023–24	La Liga	32	2	4	3	36	5
Getafe (loan)	Total		50	3	7	4	57	7
Career total			102	20	7	4	109	24
