= Fabrizio Angileri =

Argentine footballer

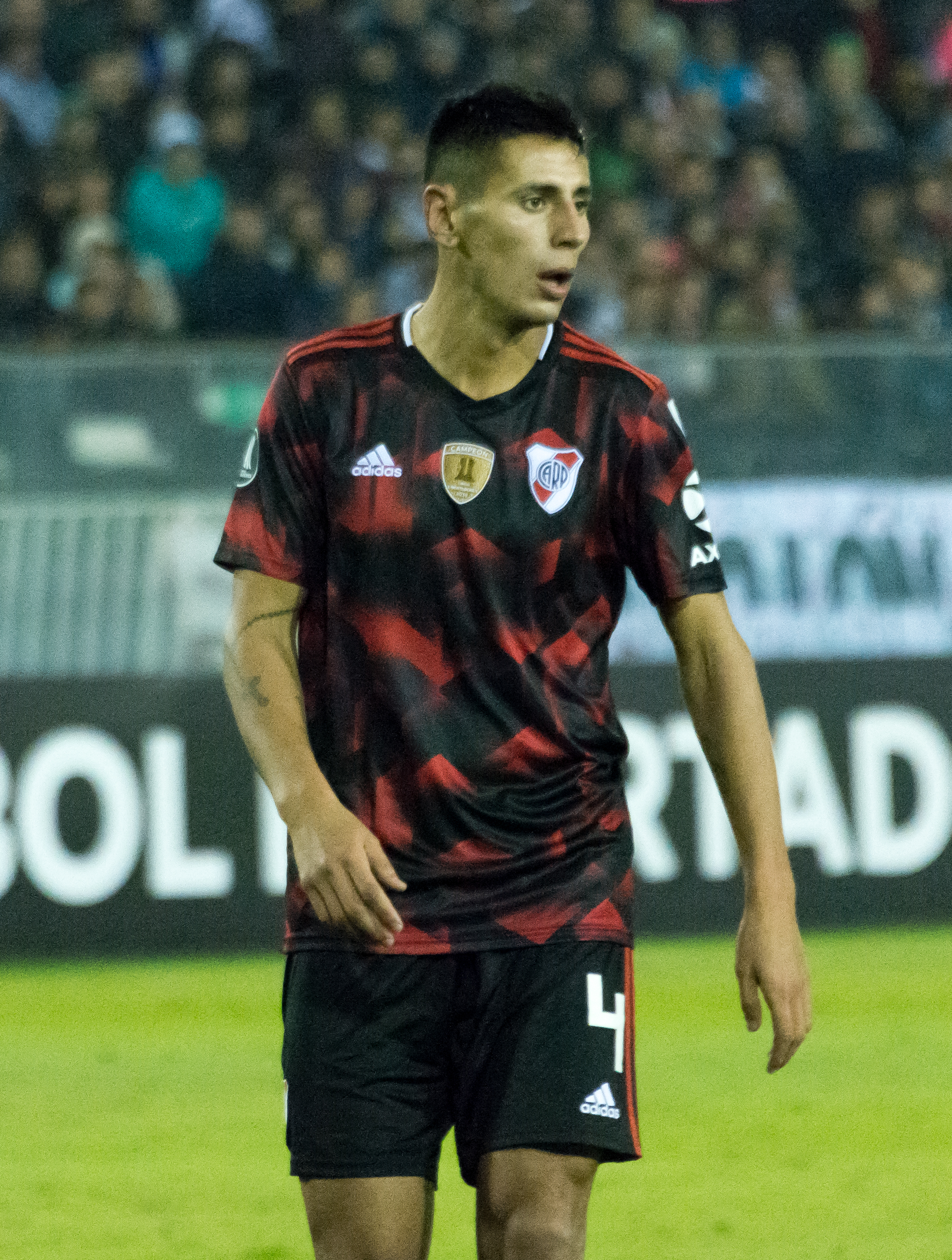
- Angileri with River Plate in 2019

Personal information
- Full name: Fabrizio Germán Angileri
- Date of birth: 15 March 1994 (age 32)
- Place of birth: Junín, Argentina
- Height: 1.79 m (5 ft 10 in)
- Position: Left-back

Team information
- Current team: Corinthians
- Number: 26

Youth career
- 2012-2014: Godoy Cruz

Senior career*
Years	Team	Apps	(Gls)
2013–2019	Godoy Cruz	94	(3)
2019	→ River Plate (loan)	4	(0)
2019–2022	River Plate	32	(2)
2022–2025	Getafe	26	(0)
2025–	Corinthians	46	(1)
- * Club domestic league appearances and goals as of 18 November 2026

Fabrizio Germán Angileri (born 15 March 1994) is an Argentine professional footballer who plays as a left-back for Campeonato Brasileiro Série A club Corinthians.

== Club career ==
=== Early years ===
Angileri joined local club Escuela Deportiva Junín at the age of six, but soon thereafter joined San Martín de Mendoza. At age 12, he made the move to Buenos Aires and joined the youth ranks of Primera División club Boca Juniors. After two years, he moved back to San Martín de Mendoza, where he remained until he signed with Godoy Cruz when he was 17.

=== Godoy Cruz ===
With his idol Martín Palermo as manager, Angileri made his professional debut in the Primera División during a matchup against All Boys on 9 February 2013. He was a 63rd-minute substitute during a 1–1 draw, coming on for Gonzalo Castellani. In his first three seasons (2012–13, 2013–14 and 2014), he made only 15 appearances. He was even called down to the reserve team during part of the 2014 season, scoring 18 goals while playing as a striker.

Gabriel Heinze, manager at the time, started to recognize him as the club's most improved player. His replacement, Daniel Oldrá, finally put him into the starting rotation during the 2015 season. He made 15 appearances that year, all but two as a starter. He also scored his first career goal on 4 October in a 3–0 win over Temperley, and added one the following game against Atletico Rafaela.

=== River Plate ===
In March 2019, he joined River Plate on loan until December 2019.

=== Getafe ===
On 14 July 2022, Angileri signed for La Liga side Getafe on a four-year deal. On 27 February 2025, after failing to make an appearance for the entire 2024–25 season, he terminated his link with the club.

== Career statistics ==
As of match played 18 November 2026

Appearances and goals by club, season and competition
Club	Season	League			National cup		League cup		Continental		Other		Total	
Club	Season	Division	Apps	Goals	Apps	Goals	Apps	Goals	Apps	Goals	Apps	Goals	Apps	Goals
Godoy Cruz	2012–13	Primera División	4	0	4	0	0	0	0	0	0	0	8	0
Godoy Cruz	2013–14	Primera División	5	0	0	0	0	0	0	0	0	0	5	0
Godoy Cruz	2014	Primera División	6	0	0	0	0	0	0	0	0	0	6	0
Godoy Cruz	2015	Primera División	15	2	0	0	0	0	0	0	0	0	15	2
Godoy Cruz	2016	Primera División	4	0	0	0	0	0	0	0	0	0	4	0
Godoy Cruz	2016–17	Primera División	18	1	0	0	0	0	7	0	0	0	25	1
Godoy Cruz	2017–18	Primera División	23	0	4	1	0	0	0	0	1	1	28	2
Godoy Cruz	2018–19	Primera División	19	0	1	0	0	0	0	0	0	0	20	0
Godoy Cruz	Total		94	3	9	1	0	0	7	0	1	1	111	5
River Plate (loan)	2019–20	Primera División	4	0	2	0	4	0	7	0	3	0	20	0
River Plate	2020–21	Primera División	9	0	3	1	0	0	6	0	1	0	19	1
River Plate	2021	Primera División	23	2	0	0	0	0	8	1	0	0	31	3
River Plate	Total		32	2	3	1	0	0	14	1	1	0	50	4
Getafe	2022–23	La Liga	15	0	0	0	–		–		–		15	0
Getafe	2023–24	La Liga	11	0	1	0	–		–		–		12	0
Getafe	Total		26	0	1	0	0	0	0	0	0	0	27	0
Corinthians	2025	Série A	28	0	7	0	0	0	3	0	4	0	42	0
Corinthians	2026	Série A	14	1	–		2	0	1	0	–		17	1
Total			42	1	7	0	2	0	4	0	4	0	59	1
Career total			198	6	22	2	6	0	32	1	9	1	267	10

== Honours ==
River Plate

- Argentine Primera División: 2021
- Copa Argentina: 2019
- Supercopa Argentina: 2019
- Recopa Sudamericana: 2019

Corinthians

- Campeonato Paulista: 2025
- Copa do Brasil: 2025
