= Carles Aleñá =

Spanish footballer (born 1998)

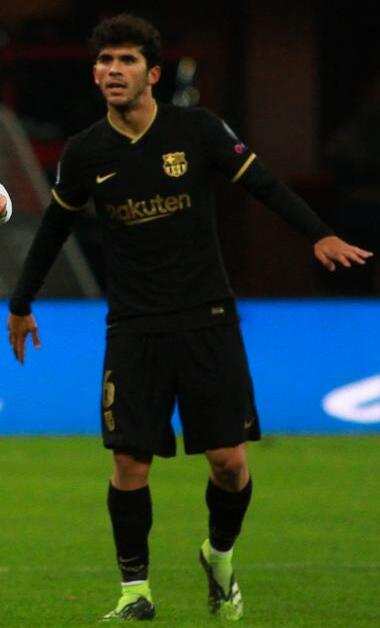
- Aleñá with Barcelona in 2020

Personal information
- Full name: Carles Aleñá Castillo
- Date of birth: 5 January 1998 (age 28)
- Place of birth: Mataró, Spain
- Height: 1.80 m (5 ft 11 in)
- Position: Central midfielder

Team information
- Current team: Alavés
- Number: 10

Youth career
- 2005–2016: Barcelona

Senior career*
Years	Team	Apps	(Gls)
2015–2018	Barcelona B	83	(18)
2016–2021	Barcelona	26	(2)
2020	→ Betis (loan)	19	(1)
2021	→ Getafe (loan)	22	(2)
2021–2025	Getafe	107	(4)
2025	→ Alavés (loan)	14	(0)
2025–	Alavés	34	(0)

International career
2012–2013	Spain U16	3	(0)
2013–2015	Spain U17	16	(3)
2015–2017	Spain U19	13	(2)
2019–2020	Spain U21	3	(0)
2022–	Catalonia	3	(2)
- * Club domestic league appearances and goals as of 27 May 2026

Carles Aleñá Castillo (born 5 January 1998) is a Spanish professional footballer who plays as a central midfielder for Alavés.

== Club career ==
=== Barcelona ===
Born in Mataró, Barcelona, Catalonia, Aleñá moved to Barcelona's youth system, La Masia, in 2005 at the age of 7, after a successful trial. Highly rated by the club, he made his debut with the reserves on 29 August 2015, coming on as a late substitute for David Babunski in a 0–0 Segunda División B home draw against Pobla de Mafumet.

On 24 November 2015, Aleñá scored a spectacular goal in a UEFA Youth League game against Roma. He scored his first senior goal on 19 December, in a Barcelona B 2–4 away loss to Eldense.

Aleñá was first included in Barcelona's main squad on 10 February 2016, remaining an unused substitute in their 1–1 away draw against Valencia in the second leg of 2015-16 Copa del Rey semi-finals. He made his first team debut on 30 November of that year, starting and scoring the equalizer in an away draw against Hércules for the same scoreline, in the same competition.

Aleñá made his La Liga debut on 2 April 2017, coming on as a second-half substitute for Ivan Rakitić in a 4–1 away routing of Granada. On 28 June, he signed a three-year professional deal with Barcelona, including a release clause of €75 million. In July 2018, he was nominated for the Golden Boy award. On 4 December 2018, Aleñá was officially promoted to the first team, two days after scoring his first league goal for Barcelona against Villarreal.

==== Loan to Betis ====
On 28 December 2019, Barcelona announced that they had reached an agreement with Real Betis for the loan transfer of Aleñá until the end of the season. He played 19 games for the team from Seville, and scored in a 3–0 home win over Osasuna on 8 July.

=== Loan and permanent transfer to Getafe ===
On 6 January 2021, it was announced that Barcelona reached an agreement with Getafe over a loan move for Aleñá until the end of the season. On 27 February, he scored his first goal for Getafe after coming off the bench in the final minutes of his team's 3–0 win against Valencia.

On 10 July 2021, Getafe reached an agreement with Barcelona to permanently sign Aleñá for five seasons. Barça also reserved the right to 50% of any future sale of the player, a buy back option plus first right of refusal on any offer.

=== Loan and permanent transfer to Alavés ===
On 3 February 2025, Aleñá moved on loan to Alavés until the end of the 2024–25 La Liga season. On 24 July, he signed a permanent four-year contract with the club.

== Personal life ==
Aleñá's father Francesc was also a footballer; a forward, he played for several clubs in the 1980s and 1990s.

== Career statistics ==
As of match played 26 February 2026

Appearances and goals by club, season and competition
Club	Season	League			Copa del Rey		Continental		Other		Total	
Club	Season	Division	Apps	Goals	Apps	Goals	Apps	Goals	Apps	Goals	Apps	Goals
Barcelona B	2015–16	Segunda División B	14	1	—		—		—		14	1
Barcelona B	2016–17	Segunda División B	23	3	—		—		6 (Note: All appearances in Segunda División B play-offs)	0	29	3
Barcelona B	2017–18	Segunda División	38	11	—		—		—		38	11
Barcelona B	2018–19	Segunda División B	8	3	—		—		—		8	3
Barcelona B	Total		83	18	0	0	0	0	6	0	89	18
Barcelona	2016–17	La Liga	3	0	1	1	0	0	0	0	4	1
Barcelona	2017–18	La Liga	0	0	3	0	0	0	0	0	3	0
Barcelona	2018–19	La Liga	17	2	7	0	3 (Note: Appearance(s) in UEFA Champions League)	0	0	0	27	2
Barcelona	2019–20	La Liga	4	0	0	0	1	0	0	0	5	0
Barcelona	2020–21	La Liga	2	0	0	0	3	0	0	0	5	0
Barcelona	Total		26	2	11	1	7	0	0	0	44	3
Real Betis (loan)	2019–20	La Liga	17	1	2	0	—		—		19	1
Getafe (loan)	2020–21	La Liga	22	2	0	0	—		—		22	2
Getafe	2021–22	La Liga	33	1	0	0	—		—		33	1
Getafe	2022–23	La Liga	35	2	3	0	—		—		38	2
Getafe	2023–24	La Liga	29	1	3	0	—		—		32	1
Getafe	2024–25	La Liga	10	0	1	0	—		—		11	0
Getafe	Total		129	6	7	0	0	0	0	0	136	6
Alavés (loan)	2024–25	La Liga	14	0	0	0	—		—		14	0
Alavés	2025–26	La Liga	25	0	4	0	—		—		29	0
Alavés	Total		39	0	4	0	0	0	0	0	43	0
Career total			294	27	24	1	7	0	6	0	331	28

== Honours ==
Barcelona

- La Liga: 2018–19
- Copa del Rey: 2016–17, 2017–18

Individual

- 2015 UEFA European Under-17 Championship Team of the Tournament
