= Óscar Rodríguez (footballer, born 1998) =

Spanish footballer

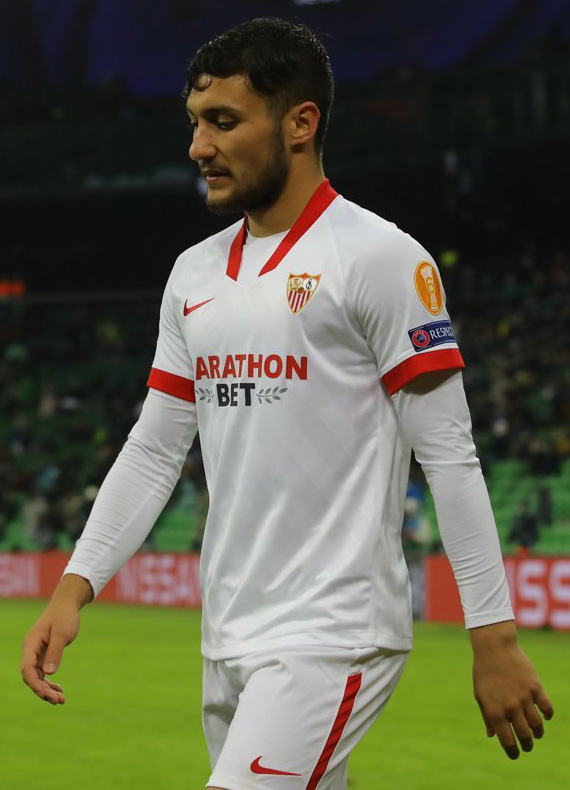
- Óscar with Sevilla in 2020

Personal information
- Full name: Óscar Rodríguez Arnaiz
- Date of birth: 28 June 1998 (age 28)
- Place of birth: Talavera de la Reina, Spain
- Height: 1.74 m (5 ft 9 in)
- Position: Attacking midfielder

Team information
- Current team: Al-Diriyah
- Number: 14

Youth career
- 2006–2009: Los Navalmorales
- 2009–2017: Real Madrid

Senior career*
Years	Team	Apps	(Gls)
2017–2018	Real Madrid B	34	(6)
2017–2020	Real Madrid	0	(0)
2018–2020	→ Leganés (loan)	61	(13)
2020–2024	Sevilla	31	(0)
2022	→ Getafe (loan)	18	(0)
2022–2023	→ Celta (loan)	33	(2)
2023–2024	→ Getafe (loan)	24	(2)
2024–2025	Leganés	29	(1)
2025–	Al-Diriyah	37	(8)

International career^{‡}
2014–2015	Spain U17	7	(2)
2016–2017	Spain U19	7	(1)
2016	Spain U20	6	(1)
2019–2020	Spain U21	8	(1)
2020	Spain	2	(0)
- * Club domestic league appearances and goals as of 20 October 2026 ‡ National team caps and goals as of 17 November 2020

Óscar Rodríguez Arnaiz (born 28 June 1998), known as Óscar Rodríguez or simply Óscar, is a Spanish professional footballer who plays as an attacking midfielder for Saudi Pro League club Al-Diriyah.

== Club career ==
=== Real Madrid ===
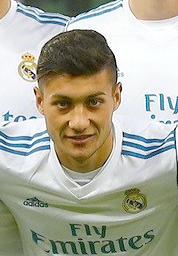
Óscar with Real Madrid Castilla in 2018

Born in Talavera de la Reina, Toledo, Castile-La Mancha, Óscar joined Real Madrid's La Fábrica in 2009, from CD Los Navalmorales. Ahead of the 2017–18 season, he was promoted to the reserves in Segunda División B.

Óscar made his senior debut on 19 August 2017, starting and being booked in a 1–2 home loss against CF Rayo Majadahonda. He scored his first goal on 11 November, netting the opener in a 2–0 away win against CCD Cerceda.

Óscar made his first-team debut on 28 November 2017, starting in a 2–2 home draw against CF Fuenlabrada, for the season's Copa del Rey. The following 12 July, after being a regular starter in Santiago Solari's Castilla, he renewed his contract until 2023.

==== Leganés (loan) ====
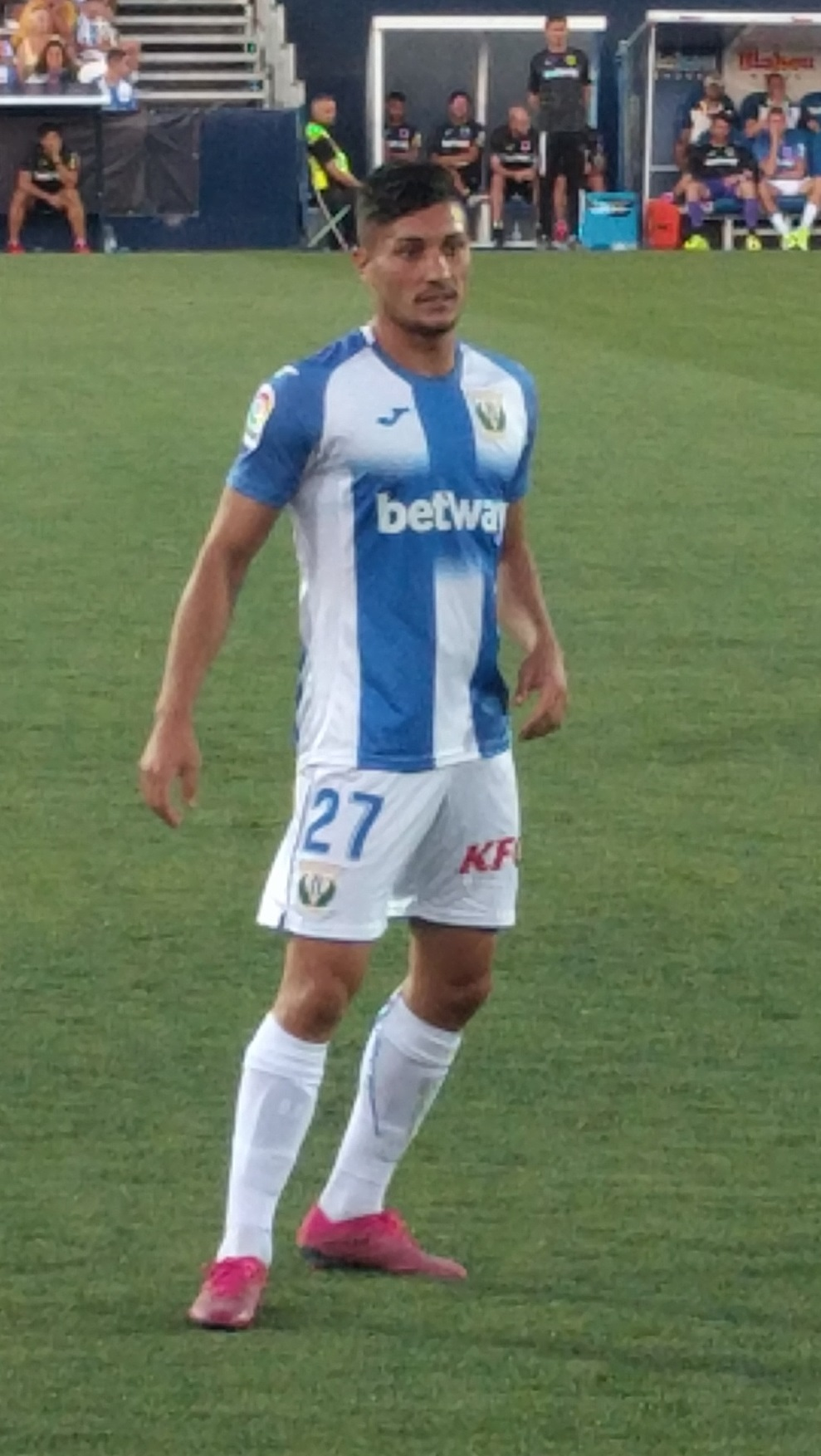
Óscar playing for Leganés in 2019

On 13 August 2018, Óscar was loaned to La Liga side CD Leganés for the season, being handed the number 27 jersey. He made his debut for the club on 16 September, replacing Diego Rolán in a 0–1 home loss against Villarreal CF.

Óscar scored his first goal in the top tier on 26 September 2018, netting the winner in a 2–1 home win over FC Barcelona. On 31 May 2019, after four goals in 30 league appearances, his loan was extended for a further year.

Óscar ended the 2019–20 campaign as Lega's top goalscorer with nine goals, but was unable to avoid team relegation.

=== Sevilla ===
In the summer of 2020, Óscar moved to Sevilla for €13.5 million.

==== Loan to Getafe ====
On 17 January 2022, Getafe announced the loan signing of Óscar until the end of the 2021–22 season.

==== Loan to Celta ====
On 8 July 2022, Celta announced the loan signing of Óscar for the 2022–23 season.

==== Second loan to Getafe ====
On 1 September 2023, Óscar returned to Geta on loan for the 2023–24 season.

=== Leganés return ===
On 11 August 2024, Óscar returned to Leganés, joining on a free transfer.

=== Al-Diriyah ===
On 2 September 2025, Óscar joined Saudi First Division League club Al-Diriyah.

== International career ==
After representing Spain at under-17, under-19, under-20 and under-21 levels, Óscar received his first senior call-up on 20 August 2020, for two UEFA Nations League fixtures against Germany and Ukraine. He made his senior debut in the former, in a 1-1 away draw.

== Career statistics ==
=== Club ===
As of match played 16 January 2024

Appearances and goals by club, season and competition
Club	Season	League			National cup		Continental		Total	
Club	Season	Division	Apps	Goals	Apps	Goals	Apps	Goals	Apps	Goals
Real Madrid Castilla	2017–18	Segunda División B	34	6	—		—		34	6
Real Madrid	2017–18	La Liga	0	0	1	0	0	0	1	0
Leganés (loan)	2018–19	La Liga	31	4	1	0	—		32	4
Leganés (loan)	2019–20	La Liga	30	9	2	0	—		32	9
Leganés (loan)	Total		61	13	3	0	—		64	13
Sevilla	2020–21	La Liga	20	0	3	2	6 (Note: Appearance(s) in UEFA Champions League)	0	29	2
Sevilla	2021–22	La Liga	11	0	3	0	1	0	15	0
Sevilla	Total		31	0	6	2	7	0	44	2
Getafe (loan)	2021–22	La Liga	18	0	0	0	—		18	0
Celta Vigo (loan)	2022–23	La Liga	33	2	3	1	—		36	3
Getafe (loan)	2023–24	La Liga	12	1	4	3	—		16	4
Career total			189	22	17	6	7	0	213	28

=== International ===
As of match played 3 September 2020

Appearances and goals by national team and year
National team	Year	Apps	Goals
Spain	2020	2	0
Total		2	0
