= 2025–26 Real Sociedad season =

Real Sociedad
2025–26 season
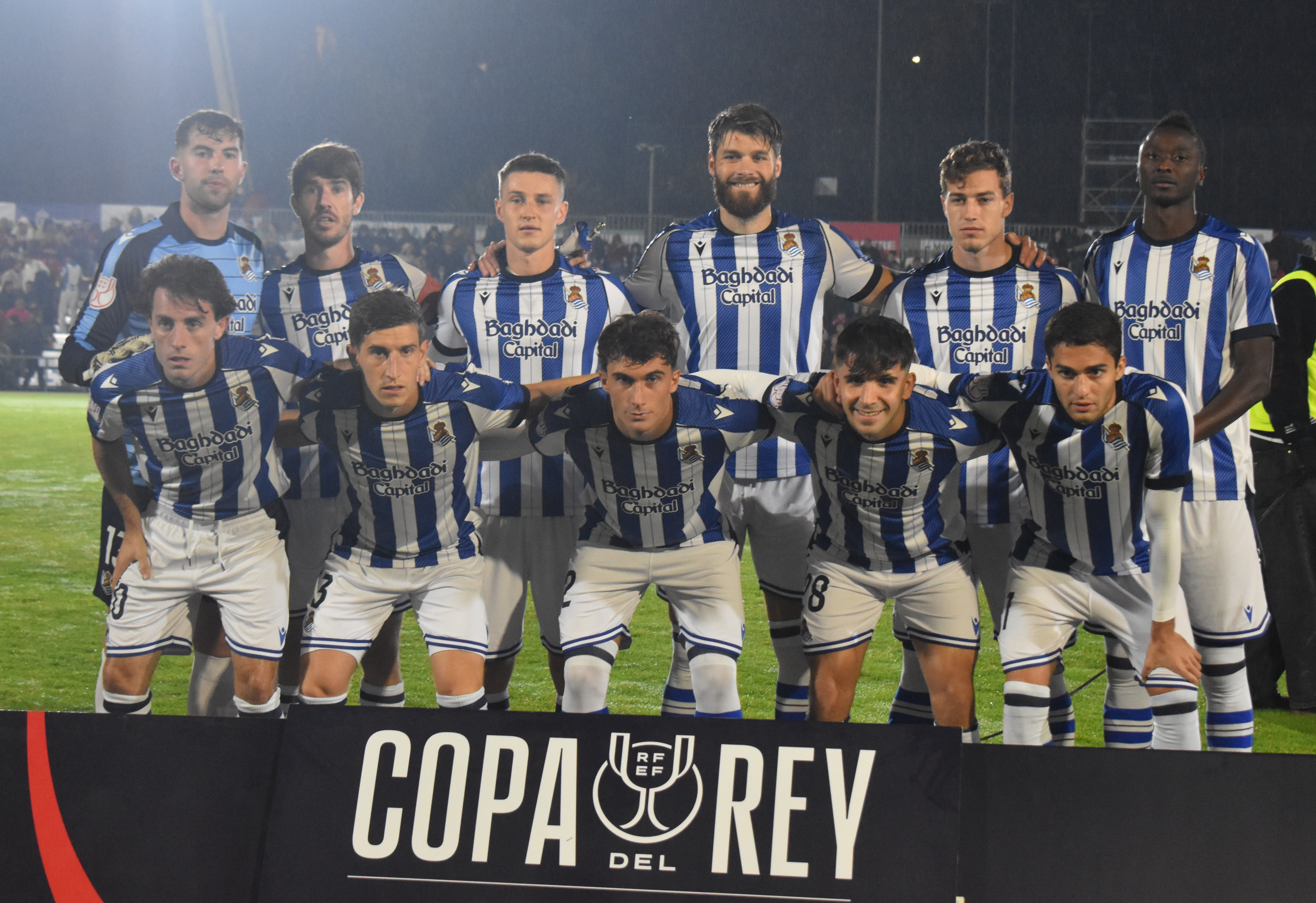
- President: Jokin Aperribay
- Head coach: Sergio Francisco (until 14 December); Ion Ansotegi (caretaker, from 14 to 20 December); Pellegrino Matarazzo (from 20 December)
- Stadium: Reale Arena
- La Liga: 10th
- Copa del Rey: Winners
- Top goalscorer: League: Mikel Oyarzabal (15); All: Mikel Oyarzabal (18)
- Highest home attendance: 36,958 vs Real Madrid
- Lowest home attendance: 22,442 vs Mallorca
- Average home league attendance: 30,339
- Biggest win: 3–0 (A)
- Biggest defeat: 1–4 (A)
| Home colours | Away colours | Third colours |

The 2025–26 season was the 116th season in the history of Real Sociedad, and the club's 16th consecutive season in La Liga. In addition to the domestic league, the club participated in the Copa del Rey.

== Players ==
=== First-team squad ===
As of 31 January 2026

Note: Flags indicate national team as defined under FIFA eligibility rules; some limited exceptions apply. Players may hold more than one non-FIFA nationality.

| No. | Pos. | Nation | Player |
|---|---|---|---|
| 1 | GK | ESP | Álex Remiro |
| 2 | DF | VEN | Jon Aramburu |
| 3 | DF | ESP | Aihen Muñoz |
| 4 | MF | ESP | Jon Gorrotxategi |
| 5 | DF | ESP | Igor Zubeldia (3rd captain) |
| 6 | DF | ESP | Aritz Elustondo (vice-captain) |
| 7 | FW | ESP | Ander Barrenetxea |
| 8 | MF | ESP | Beñat Turrientes |
| 9 | FW | ISL | Orri Óskarsson |
| 10 | FW | ESP | Mikel Oyarzabal (captain) |
| 11 | FW | POR | Gonçalo Guedes |
| 12 | MF | VEN | Yangel Herrera |
| 13 | GK | ESP | Unai Marrero |

| No. | Pos. | Nation | Player |
|---|---|---|---|
| 14 | MF | JPN | Takefusa Kubo |
| 15 | MF | ESP | Pablo Marín |
| 16 | DF | CRO | Duje Ćaleta-Car (on loan from Lyon) |
| 17 | MF | ESP | Sergio Gómez |
| 18 | MF | ESP | Carlos Soler |
| 19 | FW | ESP | Jon Karrikaburu |
| 20 | DF | ESP | Álvaro Odriozola |
| 21 | MF | RUS | Arsen Zakharyan |
| 22 | FW | BRA | Wesley (on loan from Al-Nassr) |
| 23 | MF | ESP | Brais Méndez |
| 24 | MF | CRO | Luka Sučić |
| 31 | DF | ESP | Jon Martín |
| 33 | DF | ESP | Iñaki Rupérez |

=== Reserve team ===
Note: Flags indicate national team as defined under FIFA eligibility rules; some limited exceptions apply. Players may hold more than one non-FIFA nationality.

| No. | Pos. | Nation | Player |
|---|---|---|---|
| 32 | GK | ESP | Aitor Fraga |
| 33 | DF | ESP | Iñaki Rupérez |
| 35 | GK | ESP | Egoitz Arana |

| No. | Pos. | Nation | Player |
|---|---|---|---|
| 40 | FW | ESP | Arkaitz Mariezkurrena |
| 41 | GK | FRA | Theo Folgado |

=== Out on loan ===
Note: Flags indicate national team as defined under FIFA eligibility rules; some limited exceptions apply. Players may hold more than one non-FIFA nationality.

| No. | Pos. | Nation | Player |
|---|---|---|---|
| — | DF | ESP | Jon Pacheco (at Alavés until 30 June 2026) |
| — | DF | ESP | Javi López (at Oviedo until 30 June 2026) |

| No. | Pos. | Nation | Player |
|---|---|---|---|
| — | FW | ESP | Carlos Fernández (at Mirandés until 30 June 2026) |

== Transfers ==
=== In ===
| Date | Pos. | Player | From | Fee | Ref. |
|---|---|---|---|---|---|
| 1 July 2025 | MF | (Spain) Mikel Goti | (Spain) Real Sociedad B | | |
| 1 August 2025 | DF | (Croatia) Duje Ćaleta-Car | (France) Lyon | Loan (Loan fee: €500k) | |
| 4 August 2025 | MF | (Portugal) Gonçalo Guedes | (England) Wolverhampton Wanderers | €4,000,000 | |
| 1 September 2025 | MF | (Spain) Carlos Soler | (France) Paris Saint-Germain | €6,000,000 | |
| 1 September 2025 | MF | (Venezuela) Yangel Herrera | (Spain) Girona | €11,000,000 | |

=== Out ===
| Date | Pos. | Player | From | Fee | Ref. |
|---|---|---|---|---|---|
| 1 July 2025 | MF | (Spain) Jon Magunazelaia | (Spain) Eibar | Free | |
| 6 July 2025 | MF | (Spain) Martin Zubimendi | (England) Arsenal | €70,000,000 | |
| 16 July 2025 | MF | (Spain) Jon Ander Olasagasti | (Spain) Levante | €500,000 | |
| 19 August 2025 | FW | (Spain) Carlos Fernández | (Spain) Mirandés | Loan | |
| 25 August 2025 | DF | (Spain) Jon Pacheco | (Spain) Alavés | Loan | |
| 28 August 2025 | MF | (Spain) Urko González de Zárate | (Spain) Espanyol | €5,000,000 | |
| 31 August 2025 | DF | (Spain) Javi López | (Spain) Real Oviedo | Loan | |
| 1 September 2025 | FW | (Suriname) Sheraldo Becker | (Spain) Osasuna | Free | |
| 1 September 2025 | DF | (Mali) Hamari Traoré | (France) Paris FC | €4,500,000 | |

== Pre-season and friendlies ==
| 18 July 2025 Friendly | Real Sociedad (Spain) | 2–0 | (France) Pau | San Sebastián, Spain |
| 19:00 CEST (UTC+2) | Pacheco 20'; Marin 30' | | | Stadium: Campo José Luis Orbegozo |

| 21 July 2025 Friendly | V-Varen Nagasaki (Japan) | 1–0 | (Spain) Real Sociedad | Nagasaki, Japan |
| 19:00 JST | Kasayanagi 79' | | | Stadium: Peace Stadium connected by SoftBank; Referee: Koichiro Fukushima (Japan) |

| 25 July 2025 Friendly | Yokohama FC (Japan) | 1–2 | (Spain) Real Sociedad | Yokohama, Kanagawa, Japan |
| 19:00 JST | Yamazaki 87' | | Óskarsson 16', 42' (pen.) | Stadium: NHK Spring Mitsuzawa Football Stadium; Referee: Hiroyuki Kimura (Japan) |

| 30 July 2025 Friendly | Real Sociedad | 4–1 | Osasuna | San Sebastián |
| 19:00 CEST (UTC+2) | Kubo 42'; Karrikaburu 52'; Óskarsson 63' (pen.); Turrientes 67' | | Barja 71' | Stadium: Anoeta |

| 2 August 2025 Friendly | Real Sociedad (Spain) | 1–1 | (France) Rennes | San Sebastián, Spain |
| 18:00 CEST (UTC+2) | Rupérez 50' | | Meïté 88' | Stadium: Campo José Luis Orbegozo |

| 9 August 2025 Friendly | Bournemouth (England) | 1–1 | (Spain) Real Sociedad | Bournemouth, England |
| 11:15 BST | Evanilson 9' | | Barrenetxea 89' | Stadium: Vitality Stadium; Attendance: 0 Referee: Thomas Bramall (England) |

| 9 August 2025 Friendly | Bournemouth (England) | 0–0 | (Spain) Real Sociedad | Bournemouth, England |
| 17:15 BST | | | | Stadium: Vitality Stadium; Attendance: 0 Referee: Thomas Bramall (England) |

| 9 October 2025 Friendly | Real Sociedad | 2–0 | Osasuna | San Sebastián |
| 10:00 CEST (UTC+2) | Karrikaburu 24', 29' | | | Stadium: Zubieta Facilities |

== Competitions ==
=== Overall record ===
| Competition | First match | Last match | Starting round | Final position | Record | | | | | | | |
| Competition | First match | Last match | Starting round | Final position | Pld | W | D | L | GF | GA | GD | Win % |
|---|---|---|---|---|---|---|---|---|---|---|---|---|
| La Liga | 16 August 2025 | 23 May 2026 | Matchday 1 | 10th | 38 | 11 | 13 | 14 | 59 | 61 | −2 | 28.95 |
| Copa del Rey | 28 October 2025 | 18 April 2026 | First round | Winners | 8 | 6 | 2 | 0 | 16 | 7 | +9 | 75.00 |
| Total | | | | | 46 | 17 | 15 | 14 | 75 | 68 | +7 | 36.96 |

Source: Soccerway

=== La Liga ===
==== League table ====
| Pos | Team | Pld | W | D | L | GF | GA | GD | Pts | Qualification or relegation |
|---|---|---|---|---|---|---|---|---|---|---|
| 8 | Rayo Vallecano | 38 | 12 | 14 | 12 | 41 | 44 | −3 | 50 | |
| 9 | Valencia | 38 | 13 | 10 | 15 | 46 | 55 | −9 | 49 | |
| 10 | Real Sociedad | 38 | 11 | 13 | 14 | 59 | 61 | −2 | 46 (Note: Tied on head-to-head points and goal difference. Real Sociedad placed ahead of Espanyol on overall goal difference.) | Qualification for the Europa League league phase (Note: Real Sociedad qualified for the Europa League league phase as the 2025–26 Copa del Rey winners.) |
| 11 | Espanyol | 38 | 12 | 10 | 16 | 43 | 55 | −12 | 46 | |
| 12 | Athletic Bilbao | 38 | 13 | 6 | 19 | 43 | 58 | −15 | 45 | |

Source: LaLiga EA Sports
Rules for classification: 1) Points; 2) Head-to-head points; 3) Head-to-head goal difference; 4) Goal difference; 5) Goals scored; 6) Fair-play points
(Note: Head-to-head record is used only after all the matches between the teams in question have been played)

==== Results summary ====
| Overall | | | | | | | | Home | | | | | | Away | | | | | |
| Pld | W | D | L | GF | GA | GD | Pts | W | D | L | GF | GA | GD | W | D | L | GF | GA | GD |
|---|---|---|---|---|---|---|---|---|---|---|---|---|---|---|---|---|---|---|---|
| 38 | 11 | 13 | 14 | 59 | 61 | −2 | 46 | 8 | 5 | 6 | 37 | 31 | +6 | 3 | 8 | 8 | 22 | 30 | −8 |

Source: La Liga

==== Results by round ====
| Round | 1 | 2 | 3 | 4 | 5 | 6 | 7 | 8 | 9 | 10 | 11 | 12 | 13 | 14 | 15 | 16 | 17 | 18 | 19 | 20 | 21 | 22 | 23 | 24 | 25 | 26 | 27 | 28 | 29 | 30 | 31 | 32 | 33 | 34 | 35 | 36 | 37 | 38 |
|---|---|---|---|---|---|---|---|---|---|---|---|---|---|---|---|---|---|---|---|---|---|---|---|---|---|---|---|---|---|---|---|---|---|---|---|---|---|---|
| Ground | A | H | A | H | A | H | A | H | A | H | H | A | A | H | A | H | A | H | A | H | H | A | H | A | H | A | A | H | A | H | H | H | A | A | H | A | H | A |
| Result | D | D | L | L | L | W | L | L | D | W | W | D | W | L | L | L | D | D | W | W | W | D | W | L | D | W | L | W | L | W | D | L | D | L | D | D | L | D |
| Position | 11 | 11 | 17 | 17 | 18 | 16 | 18 | 19 | 18 | 17 | 14 | 14 | 10 | 10 | 14 | 15 | 16 | 15 | 11 | 9 | 8 | 8 | 8 | 8 | 10 | 8 | 8 | 7 | 7 | 7 | 7 | 8 | 8 | 9 | 8 | 8 | 10 | 10 |

Source: La Liga
A = Away; H = Home; W = Win; D = Draw; L = Loss

==== Matches ====
The league schedule was released on 13 July 2025.

| 16 August 2025 1 | Valencia | 1–1 | Real Sociedad | Valencia |
| 21:30 CEST (UTC+2) | Gayà (yellow card) 27'; López 57' | Report | Turrientes (yellow card) 45+3'; Kubo 60'; Muñoz (yellow card) 67' | Stadium: Mestalla; Attendance: 45,333; Referee: José María Sánchez Martínez |

| 24 August 2025 2 | Real Sociedad | 2–2 | Espanyol | San Sebastián |
| 19:30 CEST (UTC+2) | Barrenetxea 61'; Óskarsson 69'; Gorrotxategi (yellow card) 75'; Martín (yellow card) 79' | Report | Milla 10'; Expósito (yellow card) 44'; Puado 45+1'; Calero (yellow card) 90+5' | Stadium: Anoeta; Attendance: 31,616; Referee: Alejandro Quintero |

| 30 August 2025 3 | Oviedo | 1–0 | Real Sociedad | Oviedo |
| 19:00 CEST (UTC+2) | Dendoncker 40'; Brekalo (yellow card) 84'; Hassan (yellow card) 90+3' | Report | Ćaleta-Car (yellow card) 45+6' | Stadium: Estadio Carlos Tartiere; Attendance: 25,688; Referee: Adrián Cordero Vega |

| 13 September 2025 4 | Real Sociedad | 1–2 | Real Madrid | San Sebastián |
| 16:15 CEST (UTC+2) | Zubeldia (yellow card) 6'; Barrenetxea (yellow card) 45+1'; Oyarzabal 56' (pen.) | Report | Mbappé 12', (yellow card) 62'; Huijsen (red card) 32'; Güler 44' | Stadium: Anoeta; Attendance: 36,958; Referee: Jesús Gil Manzano |

| 19 September 2025 5 | Real Betis | 3–1 | Real Sociedad | Seville |
| 21:00 CEST (UTC+2) | Hernández 7'; Natan (yellow card) 34'; Amrabat (yellow card) 44'; Remiro 49' (o.g.); Firpo (yellow card) 66'; Fornals 69' | Report | Méndez (yellow card) 7', (goal) 13'; Marín (yellow card) 18'; Aramburu (yellow card) 26'; Gorrotxategi (yellow card) 35'; Zubeldia (yellow card) 54'; Ćaleta-Car (yellow card) 71'; Soler (yellow card) 86' | Stadium: La Cartuja; Attendance: 59,773; Referee: Mateo Busquets Ferrer |

| 24 September 2025 6 | Real Sociedad | 1–0 | Mallorca | San Sebastián |
| 21:30 CEST (UTC+2) | Méndez (yellow card) 35'; Oyarzabal 49'; Turrientes (yellow card) 86' | Report | Maffeo (yellow card) 20'; Sánchez (yellow card) 35' | Stadium: Anoeta; Attendance: 22,442; Referee: Iosu Galech Apezteguía |

| 28 September 2025 7 | Barcelona | 2–1 | Real Sociedad | Barcelona |
| 18:30 CEST (UTC+2) | Koundé 43', (yellow card) 82'; Lewandowski 59' | Report | Zubeldia (yellow card) 17'; Odriozola 31'; Ćaleta-Car (yellow card) 90+2' | Stadium: Estadi Olímpic Lluís Companys; Attendance: 50,103; Referee: Alejandro Hernández Hernández |

| 5 October 2025 8 | Real Sociedad | 0–1 | Rayo Vallecano | San Sebastián |
| 18:30 CEST (UTC+2) | Soler (yellow card) 60' | Report | Palazón (yellow card) 62'; Pacha 84'; Lejeune (yellow card) 90+2' | Stadium: Anoeta; Attendance: 31,189; Referee: José Luis Guzmán Mansilla |

| 19 October 2025 9 | Celta Vigo | 1–1 | Real Sociedad | Vigo |
| 16:15 CEST (UTC+2) | Durán 20'; Starfelt (yellow card) 30' (yellow-red card); Rueda (yellow card) 56'; Moriba (yellow card) 90+5' | Report | Gómez (yellow card) 33'; Zubeldia (yellow card) 37'; Herrera (yellow card) 45+1'; Soler 89' | Stadium: Balaídos; Attendance: 19,102; Referee: José María Sánchez Martínez |

| 24 October 2025 10 | Real Sociedad | 2–1 | Sevilla | San Sebastián |
| 21:00 CEST (UTC+2) | Oyarzabal 19' (pen.), 36', (yellow card) 90+3' | Report | Gudelj 30'; Agoumé (yellow card) 34'; Sow (yellow card) 50'; Carmona (yellow card) 57' | Stadium: Anoeta; Attendance: 30,965; Referee: Adrián Cordero Vega |

| 1 November 2025 11 | Real Sociedad | 3–2 | Athletic Bilbao | San Sebastián |
| 18:30 CET (UTC+1) | Méndez 38'; Guedes 47'; Gorrotxategi (yellow card) 77', (goal) 90+2'; Aramburu (yellow card) 90+9' | Report | Guruzeta 42'; Ruiz de Galarreta (yellow card) 65'; Navarro 79'; Berchiche (yellow card) 90+6'; Sancet (yellow card) 90+9' | Stadium: Anoeta; Attendance: 37,685; Referee: José Luis Munuera Montero |

| 7 November 2025 12 | Elche | 1–1 | Real Sociedad | Elche |
| 21:00 CET (UTC+1) | Rodríguez 57'; Affengruber (yellow card) 73' | Report | Aramburu (yellow card) 56'; Zakharyan (yellow card) 79'; Oyarzabal 89' (pen.); Gorrotxategi (yellow card) 90+5' | Stadium: Martínez Valero; Attendance: 26,242; Referee: Isidro Díaz de Mera Escuderos |

| 22 November 2025 13 | Osasuna | 1–3 | Real Sociedad | Osasuna |
| 18:30 CET (UTC+1) | Catena 42', (yellow card) 90+1'; Arguibide (red card); Fernández (yellow card) 88'; Oroz (yellow card) 90' | Report | Méndez (yellow card) 30', (goal) 53'; Martín (yellow card) 54'; Guedes 59'; Barrenetxea 82' | Stadium: El Sadar; Attendance: 21,377; Referee: Mateo Busquets Ferrer |

| 30 November 2025 14 | Real Sociedad | 2–3 | Villarreal | San Sebastián |
| 14:00 CET (UTC+1) | Sadiq (yellow card) 42'; Soler 60'; Martín (yellow card) 69'; Barrenetxea (yellow card) 70', (goal) 87' | Report | Gueye (yellow card) 20'; Pérez 31', (yellow card) 45+2'; Moleiro (yellow card) 49', (goal) 57', 90+5'; Pedraza (yellow card) 67'; Mouriño (yellow card) 73'; Luiz Júnior (yellow card) 74' | Stadium: Anoeta; Attendance: 30,140; Referee: César Soto Grado |

| 6 December 2025 15 | Alavés | 1–0 | Real Sociedad | Vitoria-Gasteiz |
| 16:15 CET (UTC+1) | Boyé 45+4'; Guevara (yellow card) 62'; Tenaglia (yellow card) 69' | Report | Gorrotxategi (yellow card) 29'; Aramburu (yellow card) 39' | Stadium: Mendizorrotza; Attendance: 18,132; Referee: Javier Alberola Rojas |

| 12 December 2025 16 | Real Sociedad | 1–2 | Girona | San Sebastián |
| 21:00 CET (UTC+1) | Guedes 35'; Aramburu (yellow card) 74' | Report | Gil (yellow card) 60'; Tsygankov 76', 84'; Ounahi (yellow card) 79' | Stadium: Anoeta; Attendance: 26,122; Referee: Miguel Ángel Ortiz Arias |

| 20 December 2025 17 | Levante | 1–1 | Real Sociedad | Valencia |
| 16:15 CET (UTC+1) | Martínez (yellow card) 21'; Vencedor (yellow card) 53'; Arriaga (yellow card) 71'; Romero (yellow card) 73'; De la Fuente (yellow card) 74', (goal) 90+4' (pen.); Sánchez (yellow card) 84' | Report | Zubeldia (yellow card) 37'; Kubo 45+1'; Gorrotxategi (yellow card) 51' | Stadium: Estadi Ciutat de València; Attendance: 17,346; Referee: Guillermo Cuadra Fernández |

| 4 January 2026 18 | Real Sociedad | 1–1 | Atlético Madrid | San Sebastián |
| 21:00 CET (UTC+1) | Guedes 13', 55'; Ćaleta-Car (yellow card) 45+2'; Oyarzabal (yellow card) 75' | Report | Ruggeri (yellow card) 44'; Raspadori (yellow card) 78' | Stadium: Anoeta; Attendance: 31,576; Referee: Juan Martínez Munuera |

| 9 January 2026 19 | Getafe | 1–2 | Real Sociedad | Getafe |
| 21:00 CET (UTC+1) | Nyom (yellow card) 22'; Juanmi 90'; Bekoucha (yellow card) 90+2' | Report | Méndez 36'; Aramburu (yellow card) 63', (goal) 90+6' | Stadium: Coliseum; Attendance: 7,497; Referee: Francisco José Hernández Maeso |

| 18 January 2026 20 | Real Sociedad | 2–1 | Barcelona | San Sebastián |
| 21:00 CET (UTC+1) | Oryazabal 32'; Turrientes (yellow card) 37'; Aramburu (yellow card) 51'; Guedes 71'; Zubeldia (yellow card) 78'; Soler (red card) 88' | Report | Rashford 70'; E. García (yellow card) 76'; Lewandowski (yellow card) 83'; López (yellow card) 85'; De Jong (yellow card) 90+9' | Stadium: Anoeta; Attendance: 36,346; Referee: Jesús Gil Manzano |

| 25 January 2026 21 | Real Sociedad | 3–1 | Celta Vigo | San Sebastián |
| 18:30 CET (UTC+1) | Sučić (yellow card) 16'; Oyarzabal 17', 75'; Ćaleta-Car (red card) 45+2'; Méndez 90+6' (pen.) | Report | Zaragoza (yellow card) 45+3'; Iglesias 72' | Stadium: Anoeta; Attendance: 29,682; Referee: Javier Alberola Rojas |

| 1 February 2026 22 | Athletic Bilbao | 1–1 | Real Sociedad | Bilbao |
| 21:00 CET (UTC+1) | Berchiche (yellow card) 56'; Areso (yellow card) 69'; Izeta (yellow card) 75'; Paredes (yellow card) 84'; Ruiz de Galarreta 88' | Report | Zubeldia (yellow card) 23'; Guedes 37'; Martín (yellow card) 51'; Méndez (red card) 83' | Stadium: San Mamés; Attendance: 48,020; Referee: Guillermo Cuadra Fernández |

| 7 February 2026 23 | Real Sociedad | 3–1 | Elche | San Sebastián |
| 21:00 CET (UTC+1) | Sučić 24'; Oyarzabal 37'; Óskarsson 89' | Report | Affengruber (yellow card) 7'; Silva 42'; Febas (yellow card) 45+4'; Diangana (yellow card) 65'; Villar (yellow card) 87' | Stadium: Anoeta; Attendance: 30,187; Referee: Guillermo Cuadra Fernández |

| 14 February 2026 24 | Real Madrid | 4–1 | Real Sociedad | Madrid |
| 16:00 CET (UTC+1) | G. García 5'; Vinícius 25' (pen.), 48' (pen.); Valverde 31' | Report | Oyarzabal 21' (pen.); Aramburu (yellow card) 20' | Stadium: Bernabéu; Attendance: 74,176; Referee: Francisco José Hernández Maeso |

| 21 February 2026 25 | Real Sociedad | 3–3 | Oviedo | San Sebastián |
| 14:00 CET (UTC+1) | Gómez (yellow card) 32'; Óskarsson 64', 90'; Méndez (yellow card) 82'; Ćaleta-Car 87' | Report | Viñas 50', 52'; Sibo (yellow card) 70'; Bailly 90+2' | Stadium: Anoeta; Attendance: 30,917; Referee: José Luis Munuera Montero |

| 28 February 2026 26 | Mallorca | 0–1 | Real Sociedad | Palma de Mallorca |
| 18:30 CET (UTC+1) | | Report | Soler 36'; Aramburu (yellow card) 67'; Gorrotxategi (yellow card) 82' | Stadium: Estadi Mallorca Son Moix; Attendance: 17,120; Referee: Miguel Sesma Espinosa |

| 7 March 2026 27 | Atlético Madrid | 3–2 | Real Sociedad | Madrid |
| 21:00 CET (UTC+1) | Sørloth 5'; Hancko (yellow card) 20'; González 67', 81' | Report | Soler 9'; Óskarsson (yellow card) 49'; Oyarzabal 68' | Stadium: Metropolitano; Attendance: 60,788; Referee: Adrián Cordero Vega |

| 15 March 2026 28 | Real Sociedad | 3–1 | Osasuna | San Sebastián |
| 21:00 CET (UTC+1) | Oyarzabal 24' (pen.); Guedes 28', 52'; Turrientes (yellow card) 59'; Óskarsson (yellow card) 78'; Zubeldia (yellow card) 82' | Report | Muñoz 77' | Stadium: Anoeta; Attendance: 30,856; Referee: Guillermo Cuadra Fernández |

| 20 March 2026 29 | Villarreal | 3–1 | Real Sociedad | Villarreal |
| 21:00 CET (UTC+1) | Gerard Moreno 7'; Mikautadze 15'; Pépé 23' | Report | Aramburu (yellow card) 38'; Sučić 47'; Guedes (yellow card) 78' | Stadium: Estadio de la Cerámica; Attendance: 18,032; Referee: Miguel Ángel Ortiz Arias |

| 4 April 2026 30 | Real Sociedad | 2–0 | Levante | San Sebastián |
| 14:00 CEST (UTC+2) | Barrenetxea (yellow card) 15'; Martín 30'; Méndez 83'; Martín (yellow card) 87' | Report | Sánchez (yellow card) 15'; Moreno (yellow card) 17'; Espí (yellow card) 54' | Stadium: Anoeta; Attendance: 27,000; Referee: Alejandro Muñiz Ruiz |

| 11 April 2026 31 | Real Sociedad | 3–3 | Alavés | San Sebastián |
| 14:00 CEST (UTC+2) | Sučić 14'; Sivera 27' (o.g.); Óskarsson 60' | Report | Ćaleta-Car 3' (o.g.); Diabaté 24'; Rebbach (yellow card) 59'; Pérez (yellow card) 66'; Boyé 90+7'; Suárez (yellow card) 90+10' | Stadium: Anoeta; Attendance: 31,024; Referee: Víctor García Verdura |

| 22 April 2026 32 | Real Sociedad | 0–1 | Getafe | San Sebastián |
| 20:00 CEST (UTC+2) | Méndez (penalty missed) 14'; Óskarsson (yellow card) 31'; Marín (yellow card) 45' | Report | Abqar (yellow card) 27'; Gorrotxategi , 29' (o.g.); Iglesias (yellow card) 37'; Arambarri (yellow card) 90+2'; Nyom (yellow card) 90+3' | Stadium: Anoeta; Attendance: 31,464; Referee: Mateo Busquets Ferrer |

| 26 April 2026 33 | Rayo Vallecano | 3–3 | Real Sociedad | Madrid |
| 14:00 CEST (UTC+2) | Palazón (yellow card) 29' (yellow-red card) 90+12'; Camello 30'; Ciss (yellow card) 49'; Mendy (yellow card) 73'; Rațiu (yellow card) 75'; Lejeune 84', (yellow card) 90+7'; Alemão 90+9', (yellow card) 90+10' | Report | Oyarzabal 21', 76' (pen.); Gómez (yellow card) 45+1'; Óskarsson (yellow card) 56', (goal) 63'; Kubo 73'; Soler (yellow card) 90+7' | Stadium: Vallecas; Attendance: 12,845; Referee: José Luis Guzmán Mansilla |

| 4 May 2026 34 | Sevilla | 1–0 | Real Sociedad | Seville |
| 21:00 CEST (UTC+2) | Sánchez 50', (yellow card) 75'; Carmona (yellow card) 88' | Report | Aramburu (yellow card) 28' | Stadium: Ramón Sánchez-Pizjuán; Attendance: 40,792; Referee: Juan Martínez Munuera |

| 9 May 2026 35 | Real Sociedad | 2–2 | Betis | San Sebastián |
| 21:00 CEST (UTC+2) | Barrenetxea (yellow card) 62'; Óskarsson 79', (yellow card) 84'; Oyarzabal 90+1' (pen.) | Report | Antony 39'; Ezzalzouli 47'; Ruibal (yellow card) 64' (yellow-red card) 90+6'; Llorente (yellow card) 90' | Stadium: Anoeta; Attendance: 28,617; Referee: Alejandro Muñiz Ruiz |

| 14 May 2026 36 | Girona | 1–1 | Real Sociedad | Girona |
| 20:00 CEST (UTC+2) | Frances (yellow card) 62'; Stuani 66'; Roca (yellow card) 76' | Report | Barrenetxea (yellow card) 12'; Martín 28'; Aramburu (yellow card) 53'; Oyarzabal (yellow card) 59'; Gómez (yellow card) 73'; Ćaleta-Car (yellow card) 82'; Carrera (yellow card) 88'; Turrientes (yellow card) 90' | Stadium: Montilivi; Attendance: 12,519; Referee: Miguel Sesma Espinosa |

| 17 May 2026 37 | Real Sociedad | 3–4 | Valencia | San Sebastián |
| 19:00 CEST (UTC+2) | Muñoz 3'; Zakharyan (yellow card) 25'; Tárrega 60' (o.g.); Óskarsson 63'; Turrientes (yellow card) 86'; Zubeldia (yellow card) 88'; Martín (yellow card) 88' | Report | Guerra 8', 90+3'; Duro 22'; Cömert (red card) 70'; Rodríguez 89' | Stadium: Anoeta; Attendance: 29,466; Referee: Iosu Galech Apezteguía |

| 23 May 2026 38 | Espanyol | 1–1 | Real Sociedad | Cornellà de Llobregat |
| 21:00 CEST (UTC+2) | Fernández 65'; Cabrera (yellow card) 87' | Report | Gómez (yellow card) 9'; Herrera (yellow card) 23'; Óskarsson 28'; Marrero (yellow card) 65' | Stadium: RCDE Stadium; Attendance: 28,012; Referee: José Luis Munuera Montero |

=== Copa del Rey ===
| 28 October 2025 First round | Negreira | 0–3 | Real Sociedad | Negreira |
| 21:00 CET (UTC+1) | | Report | Goti 12'; Ćaleta-Car (yellow card) 45+1'; Zakharyan 54'; Turrientes 82' | Stadium: Jesús García Calvo; Attendance: 3,000; Referee: Isidro Díaz de Mera Escuderos |

| 3 December 2025 Second round | Reus FCR | 0–2 | Real Sociedad | Reus |
| 21:00 CET (UTC+1) | Ustrell (yellow card) 71'; Fernández (yellow card) 87' | Report | Marín (yellow card) 44'; Goti 49'; Sadiq (yellow card) 85', (goal) 90+3' (pen.) | Stadium: Estadi Municipal de Reus; Attendance: 4,500; Referee: Juan Martínez Munuera |

| 16 December 2025 Round of 32 | Eldense | 1–2 | Real Sociedad | Elda |
| 21:00 CET (UTC+1) | Quintanilla (yellow card) 7'; Ruiz (yellow card) 52'; Smand (yellow card) 74'; Quintana 81' | Report | Zakharyan (yellow card) 62'; Sučić 79'; Astizaran (yellow card) 87'; Marín 90+6' | Stadium: Nuevo Pepico Amat; Attendance: 3,392; Referee: Francisco José Hernández Maeso |

| 13 January 2026 Round of 16 | Real Sociedad | 2–2 (a.e.t.) (4–3 p) | Osasuna | San Sebastián |
| 21:00 CET (UTC+1) | Kubo 75', (yellow card) 77'; Zubeldia 90+2'; Oyarzabal (penalty missed) 105+2' | Report | Moncayola 4', (yellow card) 43'; Oyarzabal 17' (o.g.); Herrando (yellow card) 58'; Ru. García (yellow card) 68'; Budimir (yellow card) 120' | Stadium: Anoeta; Attendance: 30,147; Referee: César Soto Grado |
| | Penalties |
| | Oyarzabal (penalty scored); Guedes (penalty scored); Soler (penalty scored); Gómez (penalty scored); Zakharyan (penalty missed) | | (penalty scored) Budimir; (penalty missed) Moncayola; (penalty scored) Torró; (penalty scored) Galán; (penalty missed) Catena |

| 4 February 2026 Quarter-finals | Alavés | 2–3 | Real Sociedad | Vitoria-Gasteiz |
| 21:00 CET (UTC+1) | Abde 8'; Martínez 29' (pen.); Martínez (penalty missed) 67'; Guevara (yellow card) 75'; Boyé (yellow card) 83'; Ibáñez (yellow card) 90+8' | Report | Oyarzabal 15'; Turrientes (yellow card) 28'; Guedes (yellow card) 37', (goal) 76'; Muñoz (yellow card) 45+1'; Ćaleta-Car (yellow card) 66'; Óskarsson 80' | Stadium: Mendizorrotza Stadium; Attendance: 18,874; Referee: Alejandro Quintero González |

| 11 February 2026 Semi-finals first leg | Athletic Bilbao | 0–1 | Real Sociedad | Bilbao |
| 21:00 CET (UTC+1) | Ruiz de Galarreta (yellow card) 65' | Report | Guedes (yellow card) 58'; Turrientes 62'; Odriozola (yellow card) 64'; Oyarzabal (yellow card) 90+6' | Stadium: San Mamés; Attendance: 51,281; Referee: José María Sánchez Martínez |

| 4 March 2026 Semi-finals second leg | Real Sociedad | 1–0 (2–0 agg.) | Athletic Bilbao | San Sebastián |
| 21:00 CET (UTC+1) | Oyarzabal 87' (pen.); Herrera (yellow card) 90+6'; Muñoz (yellow card) 90+9' | Report | Paredes (yellow card) 23'; Jauregizar (yellow card) 56'; Guruzeta (yellow card) 71'; Ruiz de Galarreta (yellow card) 81'; Laporte (yellow card) 90+2' | Stadium: Anoeta; Attendance: 38,738; Referee: César Soto Grado |

| 18 April 2026 Final | Atlético Madrid | 2–2 (a.e.t.) (3–4 p) | Real Sociedad | Seville |
| 21:00 CEST (UTC+2) | Lookman 18'; Le Normand (yellow card) 33'; Musso (yellow card) 43'; Alvarez 83' | Report | Barrenetxea 1'; Oyarzabal (yellow card) 31', (goal) 45+1' (pen.); Gorrotxategi (yellow card) 120'; Elustondo (yellow card) 120+1' | Stadium: La Cartuja; Attendance: 70,000; Referee: Javier Alberola Rojas |
| | Penalties |
| | Sørloth (penalty missed); Alvarez (penalty missed); González (penalty scored); Almada (penalty scored); Baena (penalty scored) | | (penalty scored) Soler; (penalty missed) Óskarsson; (penalty scored) Sučić; (penalty scored) Muñoz; (penalty scored) Marín |
