= 2024–25 Getafe CF season =

Getafe CF
2024–25 season
- Owner: Ángel Torres
- President: Ángel Torres
- Head coach: José Bordalás
- Stadium: Coliseum
- La Liga: 13th
- Copa del Rey: Round of 16
- Top goalscorer: League: Mauro Arambarri (10); All: Mauro Arambarri (10)
- Highest home attendance: 15,184
- Average home league attendance: 11,464
Home colours	Away colours	Third colours

The 2024–25 season was the 42nd season in the history of Getafe Club de Fútbol, and the club's eighth consecutive season in La Liga. In addition to the domestic league, the club participated in the Copa del Rey.

== Transfers ==
=== In ===
Pos.	Player	Transferred from	Fee	Date	Source
DF	(Argentina) Jonathan Silva	(Spain) Albacete	Loan return	30 June 2024	
FW	(Spain) Darío Poveda	(Spain) Cartagena	Loan return	30 June 2024	
FW	(Honduras) Anthony Lozano	(Spain) Almería	Loan return	30 June 2024	
MF	(Ghana) Sabit Abdulai	(Spain) Real Murcia	Loan return	30 June 2024	
MF	(Nigeria) Christantus Uche	(Spain) Ceuta		1 July 2024	
FW	(Spain) Peter González	(Spain) Real Madrid Castilla	Free	4 July 2024	
GK	(Czech Republic) Jiří Letáček	(Czech Republic) Baník Ostrava	€2,000,000	13 July 2024	
MF	(Spain) Álex Sola	(Spain) Real Sociedad		15 July 2024	
DF	(Spain) Diego Rico	(Spain) Real Sociedad	€1,500,000	16 July 2024	
MF	(Spain) Carles Pérez	(Spain) Celta Vigo	Loan	30 July 2024	

=== Out ===
Pos.	Player	Transferred to	Fee	Date	Source
MF	(Guinea) Ilaix Moriba	(Germany) RB Leipzig	Loan return	30 June 2024	
FW	(Spain) Juanmi Latasa	(Spain) Real Madrid	Loan return	30 June 2024	
FW	(England) Mason Greenwood	(England) Manchester United	Loan return	30 June 2024	
FW	(Spain) Jaime Mata	(Spain) Las Palmas	End of contract	1 July 2024	
MF	(Serbia) Nemanja Maksimović	(Greece) Panathinaikos	End of contract	1 July 2024	
FW	(Turkey) Enes Ünal	(England) Bournemouth	€16,500,000	1 July 2024	
FW	(Spain) Darío Poveda	(Portugal) Farense	Contract termination	1 July 2024	
FW	(Honduras) Anthony Lozano	(Mexico) Santos Laguna	Undisclosed	12 July 2024	

== Friendlies ==
=== Pre-season ===
19 July 2024 Friendly	Getafe	0–0	Coventry City
19:00 CEST (UTC+2)

24 July 2024 Friendly	Getafe	0–1	Oviedo	Getafe
20:00 CEST (UTC+2)				Stadium: Ciudad Deportiva Fernando Santos de la Parra

31 July 2024 Friendly	Getafe	0–1	Zaragoza
19:00 CEST (UTC+2)

3 August 2024 Friendly	Getafe	1–3	Atlético Madrid	Getafe
21:00 CEST (UTC+2)	Uche 60'; Rico (yellow card) 82'; Fernández (red card) 88'	Report	Correa 38', 55'; Witsel (yellow card) 39'; Félix 45'	Stadium: Coliseum; Referee: Isidro Díaz de Mera Escuderos

7 August 2024 Friendly	Getafe	1–0	Saint-Étienne	Getafe
20:00 CEST (UTC+2)				Stadium: Coliseum

== Competitions ==
=== Overall record ===
Competition	First match	Last match	Starting round	Final position	Record							
Competition	First match	Last match	Starting round	Final position	Pld	W	D	L	GF	GA	GD	Win %
La Liga	15 August 2024	23–25 May 2025	Matchday 1		38	11	9	18	34	39	−5	28.95
Copa del Rey	26 November 2024	4 February 2025	First round	Quarter-finals	5	3	1	1	5	5	+0	60.00
Total					43	14	10	19	39	44	−5	32.56

Source: Soccerway

=== La Liga ===
==== League table ====
Pos	Team	Pld	W	D	L	GF	GA	GD	Pts
11	Real Sociedad	38	13	7	18	35	46	−11	46 (Note: Real Sociedad finished ahead of Valencia on head-to-head goal difference: Real Sociedad 3–0 Valencia, Valencia 1–0 Real Sociedad.)
12	Valencia	38	11	13	14	44	54	−10	46
13	Getafe	38	11	9	18	34	39	−5	42 (Note: Head-to-head points: Getafe 9, Espanyol 9, Alavés 0.)
14	Espanyol	38	11	9	18	40	51	−11	42
15	Alavés	38	10	12	16	38	48	−10	42

Source: LaLiga EA Sports
Rules for classification: 1) Points; 2) Head-to-head points; 3) Head-to-head goal difference; 4) Goal difference; 5) Goals scored; 6) Fair-play points
(Note: Head-to-head record is used only after all the matches between the teams in question have been played)

==== Results summary ====
Overall								Home						Away					
Pld	W	D	L	GF	GA	GD	Pts	W	D	L	GF	GA	GD	W	D	L	GF	GA	GD
33	10	9	14	31	30	+1	39	4	7	6	14	15	−1	6	2	8	17	15	+2

Last updated: 24 April 2025.
Source: La Liga

==== Results by round ====
Round	1	2	3	4	5	6	7	8	9	10	11	12	13	14	15	16	17	18	19	20	21	22	23	24	25	26	27	28	29	30	31	32	33	34
Ground	A	H	A	H	A	H	A	H	H	A	H	A	H	H	A	H	A	H	A	H	A	H	A	A	H	A	H	A	H	A	H	A	H	
Result	D	D	D	L	L	D	L	W	D	D	D	L	L	W	L	W	L	L	W	D	W	D	W	W	L	L	W	W	L	W	L	L	L	
Position	10	12	17	17	18	18	19	15	16	16	15	16	17	15	17	15	16	17	15	16	14	14	14	13	14	14	12	11	12	11	11	12	12	

Updated to match(es) played on 24 April 2025. Source: La Liga
A = Away; H = Home; W = Win; D = Draw; L = Loss

==== Matches ====
The league schedule was released on 18 June 2024.

15 August 2024 1	Athletic Bilbao	1–1	Getafe	Bilbao
19:00 CEST (UTC+2)	Sancet 27'; Prados (yellow card) 55'; Gómez (yellow card) 70'; Gorosabel (yellow card) 73'; Herrera (yellow card) 86'	Report	Uche (yellow card) 45+8', (goal) 64'	Stadium: San Mamés; Attendance: 47,845; Referee: Alejandro Muñiz Ruiz

24 August 2024 2	Getafe	0–0	Rayo Vallecano	Getafe
21:30 CEST (UTC+2)	Uche (yellow card) 41'	Report	Ciss (yellow card) 54'; Espino (yellow card) 82'	Stadium: Coliseum; Attendance: 9,529; Referee: Javier Alberola Rojas

1 September 2024 4	Getafe	0–0	Real Sociedad	Getafe
19:15 CEST (UTC+2)	Iglesias (yellow card) 22'	Report	Muñoz (yellow card) 90+4'	Stadium: Coliseum; Attendance: 10,929; Referee: José Luis Munuera Montero

14 September 2024 5	Sevilla	1–0	Getafe	Seville
18:30 CEST (UTC+2)	Navas 23'; Romero (yellow card) 56'; Juanlu (yellow card) 83' (yellow-red card) 87'	Report	Yıldırım (yellow card) 45+1'; Djené (yellow card) 63'; Santiago (yellow card) 90'; Sola (yellow card) 90+9'	Stadium: Ramón Sánchez Pizjuán; Attendance: 32,643; Referee: Mateo Busquets Ferrer

18 September 2024 3	Real Betis	2–1	Getafe	Seville
19:00 CEST (UTC+2)	Perraud (yellow card) 38'; Fornals (yellow card) 43'; Lo Celso 61' (pen.), 74'; Silva (yellow card) 88'	Report	Sola (yellow card) 12'; Aleñá (yellow card) 13'; Alderete (yellow card) 15'; Yıldırım (yellow card) 58'; Rico (yellow card) 64'; Arambarri 90+3'	Stadium: Estadio Benito Villamarín; Attendance: 48,547; Referee: Juan Luis Pulido Santana

22 September 2024 6	Getafe	1–1	Leganés	Getafe
14:00 CEST (UTC+2)	Arambarri (yellow card) 53'; Djené (yellow card) 56'; Rico (yellow card) 63'; Mayoral 83'	Report	Rodríguez (yellow card) 20'; Sáenz 76'; Nastasić (yellow card) 80'	Stadium: Coliseum; Attendance: 13,060; Referee: Adrián Cordero Vega

25 September 2024 7	Barcelona	1–0	Getafe	Barcelona
21:00 CEST (UTC+2)	Lewandowski 19'; Raphinha (yellow card) 79'	Report	Arambarri (yellow card) 69'	Stadium: Estadi Olímpic Lluís Companys; Attendance: 44,407; Referee: Pablo González Fuertes

28 September 2024 8	Getafe	2–0	Alavés	Getafe
14:00 CEST (UTC+2)	Arambarri 42', (yellow card) 78'; Milla 58' (pen.); Sola (yellow card) 67'; Álvaro (yellow card) 90+3'	Report	Abqar (yellow card) 31'; Protesoni (yellow card) 45'; Sivera (yellow card) 62'; Blanco (yellow card) 70'; García (yellow card) 81'; Vicente (yellow card) 90+4'	Stadium: Coliseum; Attendance: 10,006; Referee: Isidro Díaz de Mera Escuderos

5 October 2024 9	Getafe	1–1	Osasuna	Getafe
16:15 CEST (UTC+2)	Yıldırım 21', (yellow card) 43'; Djené (yellow card) 42'	Report	Torró (yellow card) 34'; Boyomo (yellow card) 53'; Budimir 60'; Moncayola (yellow card) 75'; Catena (yellow card) 87'	Stadium: Estadio Coliseum; Attendance: 10,670; Referee: José María Sánchez Martínez

20 October 2024 10	Villarreal	1–1	Getafe	Villarreal
18:30 CEST (UTC+2)	Albiol (yellow card) 23'; Comesaña 44'; Baena (yellow card) 49'; Parejo (yellow card) 90+1'; Femenía (yellow card) 90+4'	Report	Uche (yellow card) 23'; Arambarri (yellow card) 36'; Alderete (yellow card) 47', (goal) 87' (pen.)	Stadium: Estadio de la Cerámica; Attendance: 19,355; Referee: Víctor García Verdura

27 Octobre 2024 11	Getafe	1–1	Valencia	Getafe
17:15 CET (UTC+1)	C.Pérez (yellow card) 44'; Arambarri 90'; Nyom (yellow card) 90+2'; Djené (yellow card) 90+2'	Report	Barrenechea 36', (yellow card) 67'; Mosquera (yellow card) 41'; D.López (yellow card) 42'; Thierry (yellow card) 45+1'; L.Rioja (yellow card) 54'; Foulquier (yellow card) 65'; Hugo Duro (yellow card) 88'	Stadium: Estadio Coliseum; Attendance: 12.412; Referee: Guillermo Cuadra Fernández

5 November 2024 12	Celta Vigo	1–0	Getafe	Vigo
21:00	Douvikas 7', (yellow card) 24'	Report	Nabil (yellow card) 22'; Berrocal (yellow card) 55' (yellow-red card) 65'; Alderete (yellow card) 90+1'	Stadium: Balaídos; Attendance: 19,502; Referee: Jesús Gil Manzano

10 November 2024 13	Getafe	0–1	Girona	Getafe
18:30 CET (UTC+1)	Rico (yellow card) 38'; Sola (yellow card) 87'; Yıldırım (yellow card) 90+2'	Report	Van de Beek (yellow card) 34'; Romeu (yellow card) 39'; Herrera (yellow card) 40', (goal) 42'	Stadium: Coliseum; Attendance: 10,923; Referee: Juan Martínez Munuera

22 November 2024 14	Getafe	2–0	Real Valladolid	Getafe
22:00 CET (UTC+1)	Djene (yellow card) 35'; Bertug (yellow card) 61'; Nyom (yellow card) 61', (goal) 73'; Álvaro 70'	Report	Pezzolano (yellow card) 45+1' (yellow-red card) 45+4'; Anuar (yellow card) 61'; I.Sánchez (yellow card) 90+3'	Stadium: Coliseum; Attendance: 9.911

1 December 2024 15	Real Madrid	2–0	Getafe	Madrid
16:15 UTC+1	Bellingham 30' (pen.); Mbappé 38'	Report		Stadium: Santiago Bernabéu; Attendance: 74,341; Referee: Alejandro Hernández Hernández

10 December 2024 16	Getafe	1–0	Espanyol	Getafe
22:00 CET (UTC+1)	Álvaro 8'; Alderete (yellow card) 29'; Arambarri (yellow card) 42'; J.Patrick (yellow card) 83'	Report	Jofre (yellow card) 5'; El Hilali (yellow card) 57'; Cabrera (yellow card) 64'; A.Roca (yellow card) 82'; S.Gómez (yellow card) 90'; B.Oliván (yellow card) 90'	Stadium: Coliseum; Attendance: 7.559; Referee: Mateo Busquets Ferrer

15 December 2024 17	Atlético Madrid	1–0	Getafe	Madrid
13:00	Sørloth 69'; Correa (yellow card) 72'; De Paul (yellow card) 90'; Koke (yellow card) 90+2'	Report	Iglesias (yellow card) 69'	Stadium: Riyadh Air Metropolitano; Attendance: 60.169; Referee: César Soto Grado

21 December 2024 18	Getafe	0–1	Mallorca	Getafe
13:00	Djené (yellow card) 21'; Yıldırım (yellow card) 33'; Rico (yellow card) 79'; Berrocal (yellow card) 80'	Report	Sánchez (yellow card) 16'; Larin 53' (pen.); Greif (yellow card) 59'; Navarro (yellow card) 87'	Stadium: Coliseum; Attendance: 9.747; Referee: José Luis Munuera Montero

12 January 2025 19	Las Palmas	1–2	Getafe	Las Palmas
18:30	Essugo (yellow card) 46'; Álex Suárez (yellow card) 82'; Januzaj 88'	Report	Arambarri (yellow card) 16'; Milla (yellow card) 64'; Coba 70', (yellow card) 82'; Mayoral 86'	Stadium: Estadio Gran Canaria; Attendance: 23,698; Referee: Javier Alberola Rojas

18 January 2025 20	Getafe	1–1	Barcelona	Getafe
21:00	Arambarri 34'; Santiago (yellow card) 53'; Djené (yellow card) 86'; Bekhoucha (yellow card) 90+5'	Report	Koundé 9'; Raphinha (yellow card) 90+5'; Balde (yellow card) 90+6'	Stadium: Coliseum; Attendance: 15,134; Referee: Pablo González Fuertes

26 January 2025 21	Real Sociedad	0–3	Getafe	San Sebastián
16:15	Turrientes (yellow card) 15'; Kubo (yellow card) 90+5'; Aramburu (yellow card) 90+6'	Report	Milla (yellow card) 25'; Yıldırım (yellow card) 45+1'; Alderete (yellow card) 54'; Uche 72'; Pérez 74', 85'; Santiago (yellow card) 90'; Berrocal (yellow card) 90+2'; Coba (yellow card) 90+6'	Stadium: Reale Arena; Attendance: 30,004; Referee: Guillermo Cuadra Fernández

1 February 2025 22	Getafe	0–0	Sevilla	Getafe
14:00	Coba (yellow card) 25'; Berrocal (yellow card) 37'; Djené (yellow card) 38'; Iglesias (yellow card) 56'	Report	Romero (yellow card) 19'; Saúl (yellow card) 24'; Lukebakio (yellow card) 50'; Sambi Lokonga (yellow card) 54'; Carmona (yellow card) 90+1'; Gudelj (yellow card) 90+7'	Stadium: Coliseum; Attendance: 11,730; Referee: Ricardo de Burgos Bengoetxea

9 February 2025 23	Alavés	0–1	Getafe	Vitoria-Gasteiz
19:00	Abqar (yellow card) 42'; Villalibre (yellow card) 90+3'	Report	Chrisantus (yellow card) 40'; Arambarri 44' (pen.), (yellow card) 66'; Nyom (yellow card) 67'; Juanmi (yellow card) 70'; Terrats (yellow card) 81'; Soria (yellow card) 85'	Stadium: Mendizorrotza; Attendance: 16.236; Referee: Isidro Díaz de Mera Escuderos

14 February 2025 24	Girona	1–2	Getafe	Girona
21:00	Herrera 54', (red card) 73'; Portu (yellow card) 79'; Asprilla (yellow card) 90+7'	Report	Uche 3', (yellow card) 88'; Mayoral 62'; Pérez (yellow card) 76'; Alderete (yellow card) 90'	Stadium: Estadio Municipal de Montilivi; Attendance: 10.354; Referee: Alejandro Quintero González

23 February 2025 25	Getafe	1–2	Real Betis	Getafe
18:30	Rodríguez (yellow card) 79'; Mayoral 82'; Duarte (yellow card) 90' (yellow-red card) 90+6'	Report	Isco 18', 77' (pen.); Antony (red card) 90+4'	Stadium: Coliseum; Attendance: 13,964; Referee: Javier Alberola Rojas

2 March 2025 26	Leganés	1–0	Getafe	Leganés
14:00	Javi (yellow card) 71'; García 90+2'	Report	Arambarri (yellow card) 86'	Stadium: Municipal de Butarque; Attendance: 10.311; Referee: Juan Martínez Munuera

9 March 2025 27	Getafe	2–1	Atlético Madrid	Getafe
14:00	Alderete (yellow card) 40'; Álvaro (yellow card) 57'; Djené (yellow card) 74'; Rico (yellow card) 74'; Arambarri 88', 90+2'; Juanmi (yellow card) 90+11'; Yellu (yellow card) 90+12'	Report	Sørloth 75' (pen.), (yellow card) 90+8'; Le Normand (yellow card) 40'; Correa (red card) 88'	Stadium: Coliseum; Attendance: 12.862; Referee: Guillermo Cuadra Fernández

16 March 2025 28	Osasuna	1–2	Getafe	Pamplona
18:30	Areso (yellow card) 15'; Torró (yellow card) 34'; Budimir 45' (pen.)	Report	Djené (yellow card) 29'; Duarte (yellow card) 43'; Terrats 55', 71'; Chrisantus (yellow card) 76' (yellow-red card) 77'	Stadium: El Sadar; Attendance: 19.611; Referee: Alejandro Hernández Hernández

30 March 2025 29	Getafe	1–2	Villarreal	Getafe
15:00	Rico (yellow card) 10'; C.Pérez 29'	Report	Ayoze 15'; Kambwala (yellow card) 31'; Barry 33'; Cardona (yellow card) 78'; Santi (yellow card) 80'; Reis (yellow card) 82'	Stadium: Coliseum; Attendance: 11.406; Referee: Isidro Díaz de Mera

6 April 2025 30	Valladolid	0–4	Getafe	Valladolid
18:30	Latasa (yellow card) 9'; Cömert (yellow card) 14'; Martín (red card) 45+2'; Sylla (yellow card) 71'	Report	Arambarri 1'; Terrats 19', 38'; Iglesias (yellow card) 58'; Duarte 80'	Stadium: José Zorrilla; Attendance: 17.737; Referee: Alejandro Quintero González

12 April 2025 31	Getafe	1–3	Las Palmas	Getafe
16:15	Alderete 19'; Rico (red card) 33'	Report	Bajčetić (yellow card) 48'; Silva 53', 74'; McBurnie 61'; Mata (yellow card) 85'	Stadium: Coliseum; Attendance: 8.370; Referee: Javier Alberola Rojas

18 April 2025 32	Espanyol	1–0	Getafe	Cornellà de Llobregat
21:00	Kumbulla 39'	Report	da Costa (yellow card) 14'; Chrisantus (red card) 60'; Arambarri (yellow card) 73'	Stadium: Stage Front Stadium; Attendance: 25.003; Referee: Ricardo De Burgos Bengochea

23 April 2025 33	Getafe	0–1	Real Madrid	Getafe
21:30	Milla (yellow card) 87'; Álvaro (yellow card) 90+1'; Federico (yellow card) 90+5'	Report	Güler 21'; Tchouaméni (yellow card) 69'	Stadium: Coliseum; Attendance: 15.184; Referee: José Sánchez Martínez

2 May 2025 34	Rayo Vallecano	1–0	Getafe	Madrid

10 May 2025 35	Valencia	3–0	Getafe	Valencia

15 May 2025 36	Getafe	0–2	Athletic Bilbao	Getafe

18 May 2025 37	Mallorca	1–2	Getafe	Palma

24 May 2025 38	Getafe	1–2	Celta Vigo	Getafe

=== Copa del Rey ===
31 October 2024 First round	Manises CF	0–3	Getafe	Manises
19:00 UTC+1	Josevi (yellow card) 12'; Pastor (yellow card) 29'; Germán (yellow card) 43'	Report	Yıldırım 32', 45'; Peter 42'; Aberdin (yellow card) 70'	Stadium: Municipal; Referee: César Soto Grado

5 December 2024 Second round	Orihuela	0–0 (a.e.t.) (0–3 p)	Getafe	Orihuela
19:00 UTC+1	Koroma (yellow card) 71'; Bianconi (yellow card) 93'; Jaime Escobar (yellow card) 119'	Report	Yıldırım (penalty missed) 51'; Rodríguez (yellow card) 53'; Coba da Costa (yellow card) 93'; Aberdin (yellow card) 109'	Stadium: Los Arcos; Referee: José Luis Munuera Montero
	Penalties
	Isnaldo (penalty missed); Basterrechea (penalty missed); Goyo (penalty missed)		Milla (penalty scored); Yellu (penalty scored); Iglesias (penalty scored)

3 January 2025 Round of 32	Granada	0–1 (a.e.t.)	Getafe	Granada
19:00	Sánchez (yellow card) 6'; Loïc Williams (yellow card) 31'; Villar (yellow card) 112'; Reinier (yellow card) 116'; Sánchez (yellow card) 120+2'	Report	Diego Rico (yellow card) 42'; Coba da Costa (yellow card) 80'; Mayoral 93'; Argüelles (yellow card) 114'; Santiago (yellow card) 116'; Letacek (yellow card) 118'	Stadium: Estadio Nuevo de Los Cármenes; Attendance: 16.616; Referee: José María Sánchez Martínez

15 January 2025 Round of 16	Pontevedra	0–1	Getafe	Pontevedra
17:30	Pelayo Suárez (yellow card) 73'; Dalisson (yellow card) 90+1'	Report	Rodríguez 2', (red card) 41'; Federico (yellow card) 40'; Coba da Costa (yellow card) 45+5'; José Bordalás (yellow card) 45+5'; Diego Rico (yellow card) 78' (yellow-red card) 90+2'; Arambarri (yellow card) 80'	Stadium: Pasarón; Referee: Alejandro Quintero González

4 February 2025 Quarter-finals	Atlético Madrid	5–0	Getafe	Madrid
21:30 CET (UTC+1)	Simeone 8', 17'; Lino 42'; Gallagher (yellow card) 70'; Correa 78'; Sørloth 86'	Report	Uche (yellow card) 8'; Bekhoucha (yellow card) 77'	Stadium: Riyadh Air Metropolitano; Attendance: 60,000; Referee: Guillermo Cuadra Fernández
