= 1982 Copa Libertadores finals =

1982 Copa Libertadores de América finals
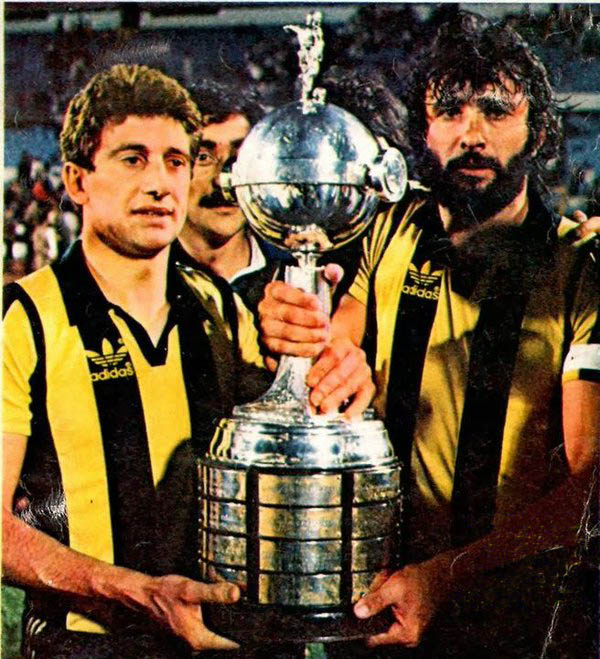
- Peñarol, champions
- Event: 1982 Copa Libertadores
Peñarol	Cobreloa
(Uruguay)	(Chile)
1	0

First leg
Peñarol	Cobreloa
0	0
- Date: November 26, 1982
- Venue: Estadio Centenario, Montevideo
- Referee: Assis de Aragão (Brazil)

Second leg
Cobreloa	Peñarol
0	1
- Date: November 30, 1982
- Venue: Estadio Nacional, Santiago
- Referee: Jorge Romero (Argentina)

The 1982 Copa Libertadores de América finals was the final two-legged tie to determine the champion of the 1982 edition. It was contested by Uruguayan club Peñarol and Chilean club Cobreloa. The first leg of the tie was played on 26 November at Estadio Centenario (used by Peñarol as its home venue by then) with the second leg played on 30 November at Estadio Nacional in Santiago.

Peñarol won the series by 1–0 on aggregate, achieving their 4th Copa Libertadores title.

== Format ==
The finals were played over two legs; home and away. The team that accumulated the most points —two for a win, one for a draw, zero for a loss— after the two legs was to be crowned the champion. If the two teams were tied on points after the second leg, a playoff at a neutral venue would become the next tie-breaker. Goal difference was going to be used as a last resort.

== Qualified teams ==
Team	Previous finals app.
(Uruguay) Peñarol	**1960, 1961**, 1962, 1965, **1966**, 1970
(Chile) Cobreloa	1981

Bold indicates winning years

== Venues ==
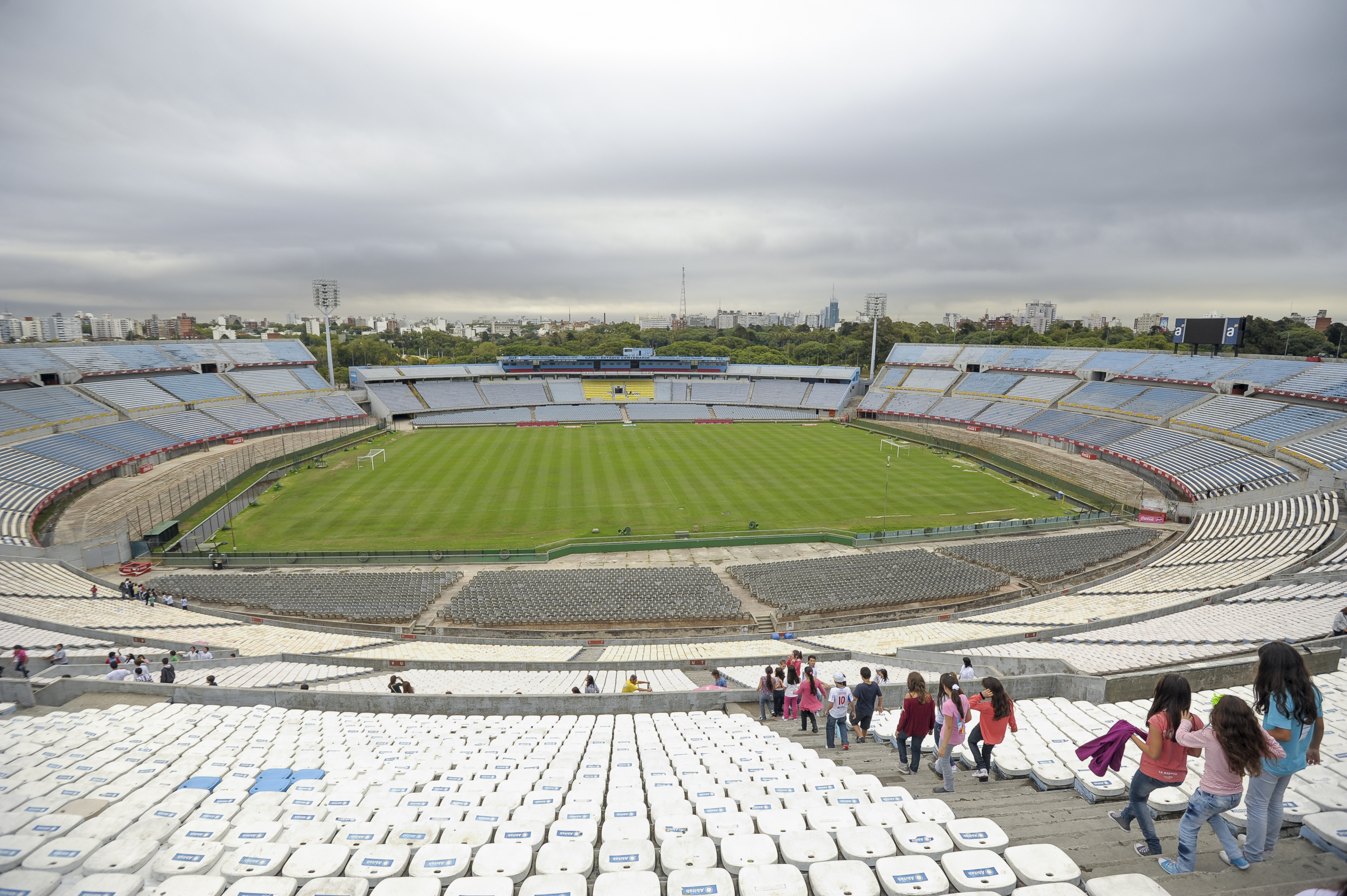
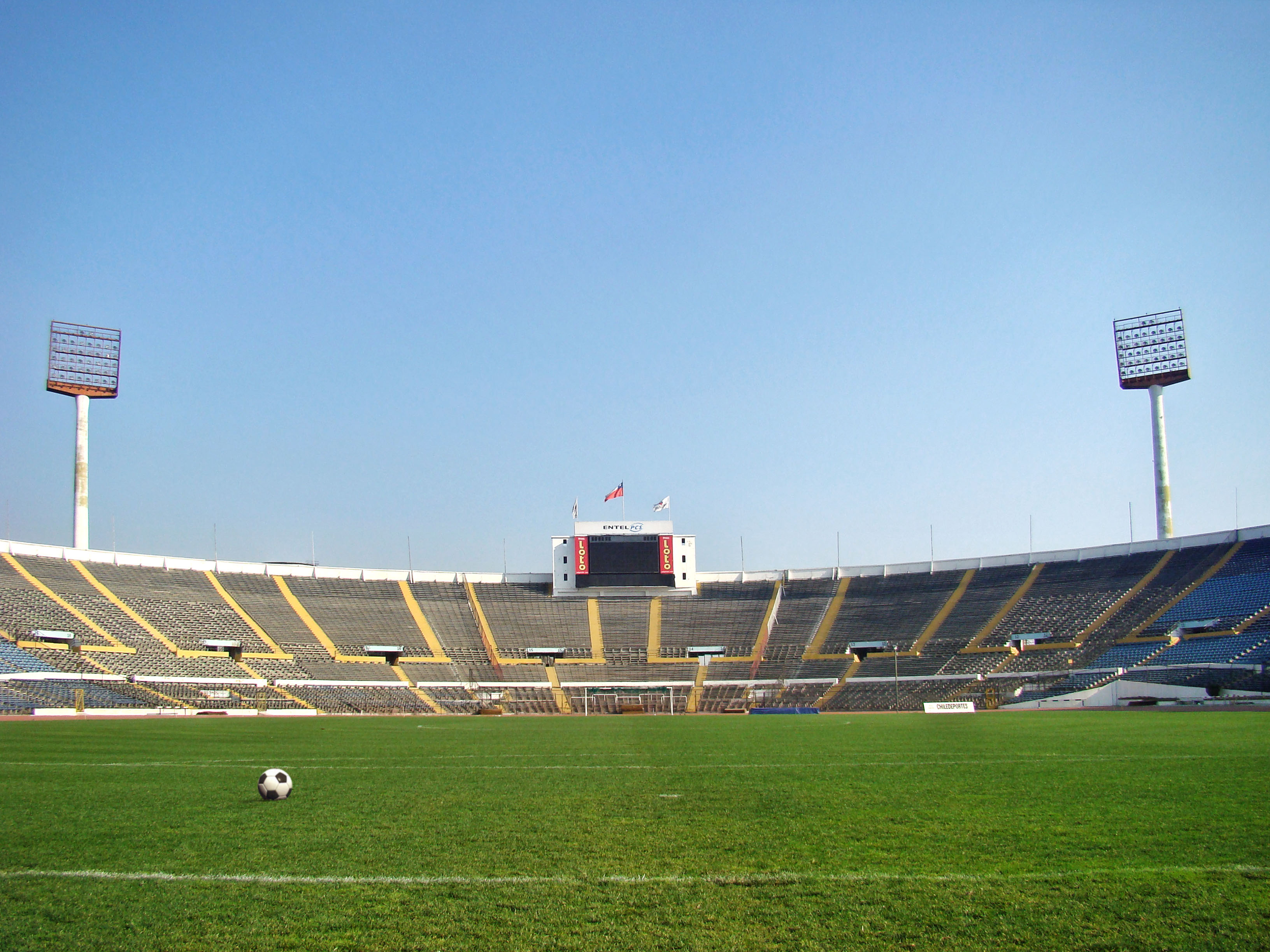
Estadio Centenario (Montevideo) and Estadio Nacional (Santiago), venues for the finals

== Match details ==
=== First leg ===
1982 Copa Libertadores finals
November 26, 1982
First leg

Peñarol (Uruguay)	0–0	(Chile) Cobreloa
	Report

Estadio Centenario, Montevideo
Attendance: 55,248
Referee: José de Assis Aragão (Brazil)

**Peñarol**	**Cobreloa**

GK	1	(Uruguay) Gustavo Fernández
DF	4	(Uruguay) Víctor Diogo
DF	2	(Uruguay) Walter Olivera (c)		(yellow card) 45'
DF	3	(Uruguay) Nelson Gutiérrez
DF	6	(Uruguay) Juan V. Morales
MF	8	(Uruguay) Mario Saralegui
MF	5	(Uruguay) Miguel Bossio
MF	10	(Brazil) Jair
FW	7	(Uruguay) Ernesto Vargas
FW	9	(Uruguay) Fernando Morena		(yellow card) 28'
FW	16	(Uruguay) Walkir Silva	(substituted off) 62'
Substitutes:
FW	17	(Uruguay) Daniel Rodríguez	(substituted on) 62'
Manager:
(Uruguay) Hugo Bagnulo

GK	1	(Chile) Oscar Wirth
RB	2	(Chile) Hugo Tabilo
CB	13	(Chile) Eduardo Gómez
CB	4	(Chile) Mario Soto (c)
LB	20	(Chile) Enzo Escobar
DM	6	(Chile) Eduardo Jiménez
CM	14	(Chile) Armando Alarcón		(yellow card) 11'
CM	8	(Chile) Víctor Merello	(substituted off) 71'
RW	10	(Chile) Rubén Gómez
CF	9	(Uruguay) Jorge Luis Siviero
LW	15	(Uruguay) Washington Olivera	(substituted off) 76'	(yellow card) 70'
Substitutes:
FW	11	(Chile) Héctor Puebla	(substituted on) 71'
FW	22	(Chile) Hugo Rubio	(substituted on) 76'
Manager:
(Argentina) Vicente Cantatore

=== Second leg ===
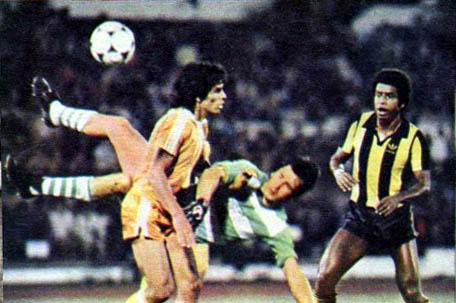
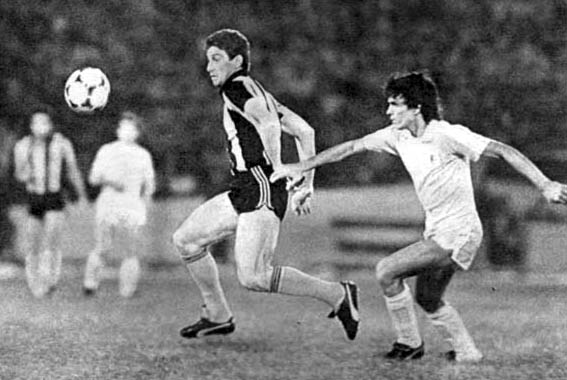
Two moments of the match in Santiago
November 30, 1982
Second leg

Cobreloa (Chile)	0–1	(Uruguay) Peñarol
		Morena 89'

Estadio Nacional, Santiago
Attendance: 70,400
Referee: Jorge Romero (Argentina)

**Cobreloa**	**Peñarol**

GK	1	(Chile) Oscar Wirth
RB	2	(Chile) Hugo Tabilo	(substituted off) 57'
CB	3	(Chile) Juan Páez
CB	4	(Chile) Mario Soto (c)
LB	20	(Chile) Enzo Escobar
DM	6	(Chile) Eduardo Jiménez
CM	14	(Chile) Armando Alarcón
CM	8	(Chile) Víctor Merello
RW	11	(Chile) Héctor Puebla
CF	9	(Uruguay) Jorge Luis Siviero
LW	15	(Uruguay) Washington Olivera	(substituted off) 57'
Substitutes:
DF	19	(Chile) Sergio Martínez	(substituted on) 57'
FW	12	(Chile) Juan Carlos Letelier	(substituted on) 57'
Manager:
(Argentina) Vicente Cantatore

GK	1	(Uruguay) Gustavo Fernández
DF	4	(Uruguay) Víctor Diogo
DF	2	(Uruguay) Walter Olivera (c)
DF	3	(Uruguay) Nelson Gutiérrez
DF	6	(Uruguay) Juan V. Morales
MF	8	(Uruguay) Mario Saralegui
MF	5	(Uruguay) Miguel Bossio
MF	10	(Brazil) Jair		(yellow card) 77'
FW	7	(Uruguay) Ernesto Vargas	(substituted off) 32'
FW	9	(Uruguay) Fernando Morena
FW	11	(Uruguay) Venancio Ramos
Substitutes:
FW	17	(Uruguay) Daniel Rodríguez	(substituted on) 32'
Manager:
(Uruguay) Hugo Bagnulo
