= Jon Gorrotxategi =

Spanish footballer

Personal information
- Full name: Jon Gorrotxategi Etxaniz
- Date of birth: 2 September 2002 (age 24)
- Place of birth: Eibar, Spain
- Height: 1.77 m (5 ft 10 in)
- Position: Midfielder

Team information
- Current team: Real Sociedad
- Number: 4

Youth career
- Eibar
- 2017–2021: Real Sociedad

Senior career*
Years	Team	Apps	(Gls)
2020–2022	Real Sociedad C	40	(2)
2022–2025	Real Sociedad B	67	(5)
2024–2025	→ Mirandés (loan)	42	(4)
2025–	Real Sociedad	36	(1)

International career^{‡}
2025–	Basque Country	1	(0)
- * Club domestic league appearances and goals as of 25 October 2026 ‡ National team caps and goals as of 15 November 2025

Jon Gorrotxategi Etxaniz (born 2 September 2002), also known as Gorrotxa, is a Spanish professional footballer who plays as a midfielder for Real Sociedad.

== Career ==
Born in Eibar, Gipuzkoa, Basque Country, Gorrotxategi joined Real Sociedad's youth sides in 2017, from hometown side SD Eibar. He made his senior debut with the former's C-team on 18 October 2020, coming on as a second-half substitute for Alberto Dadie in a 2–1 Tercera División away loss to Gernika Club.

Gorrotxategi became a regular starter for the C's during the 2021–22 season, and scored his first senior goal on 27 November 2021 by netting the second in a 2–2 home draw against Burgos CF Promesas. He was promoted to the reserves in Primera Federación the following July, and renewed his contract until 2027 on 21 July 2023.

On 9 August 2024, Gorrotxategi was loaned to Segunda División side CD Mirandés for the 2024–25 campaign. He made his professional debut seven days later, starting in a 1–0 home win over Córdoba CF.

== International career ==
Gorrotxategi was called up to the Basque Country national team for a friendly match against Palestine on 15 November 2025.

== Career statistics ==
As of match played 25 October 2026

Appearances and goals by club, season and competition
Club	Season	League			National cup		Europe		Other		Total	
Club	Season	Division	Apps	Goals	Apps	Goals	Apps	Goals	Apps	Goals	Apps	Goals
Real Sociedad C	2020–21	Segunda División B	9	0	—		—		—		9	0
Real Sociedad C	2021–22	Segunda Federación	31	2	—		—		1 (Note: Appearance in 2022 Segunda División RFEF play-offs)	0	32	2
Real Sociedad C	Total		40	2	—		—		1	0	41	2
Real Sociedad B	2022–23	Primera Federación	32	2	—		—		2 (Note: Appearances in 2023 Primera Federación play-offs)	0	34	2
Real Sociedad B	2023–24	Primera Federación	35	3	—		—		—		35	3
Real Sociedad B	Total		67	5	—		—		2	0	69	5
Mirandés (loan)	2024–25	Segunda División	42	4	0	0	—		4 (Note: Appearances in La Liga play-offs)	0	46	4
Real Sociedad	2025–26	La Liga	29	1	7	0	—		—		36	1
Real Sociedad	2026–27	La Liga	7	0	0	0	3 (Note: Appearances in UEFA Europa League)	0	0	0	10	0
Real Sociedad	Total		36	1	7	0	3	0	0	0	46	1
Career total			185	12	7	0	3	0	7	0	202	12

== Honours ==
Real Sociedad

- Copa del Rey: 2025–26
