= Iñaki Rupérez =

Spanish footballer (born 2002)

Personal information
- Full name: Iñaki Rupérez Urtasun
- Date of birth: 7 January 2003 (age 23)
- Place of birth: Ansoáin, Spain
- Height: 1.66 m (5 ft 5 in)
- Position: Right-back

Team information
- Current team: Real Sociedad B
- Number: 22

Youth career
- Osasuna

Senior career*
| Years | Team | Apps | (Gls) |
| 2022–2023 | Real Sociedad C | 17 | (1) |
| 2023– | Real Sociedad B | 59 | (7) |
| 2024– | Real Sociedad | 1 | (0) |
- * Club domestic league appearances and goals as of 21:22, 23 May 2026 (UTC)

Iñaki Rupérez Urtasun (born 7 January 2003) is a Spanish footballer who plays as a right-back for Real Sociedad B.

== Career ==
Born in Ansoáin, Navarre, Rupérez played for CA Osasuna as a youth, and signed a two-year contract with the club in 2019. In May 2022, he agreed to a deal with Real Sociedad, being initially assigned to the C-team.

Promoted to the reserves in July 2023, Rupérez renewed his contract with the Txuri-urdin until 2027 on 20 February of the following year, after establishing himself as a first-choice. He made his first team debut on 21 November 2024, coming on as a late substitute for fellow youth graduate Luken Beitia in a 5–0 away routing of FC Jove Español San Vicente, for the campaign's Copa del Rey.

== Career statistics ==
As of match played 23 May 2026

Appearances and goals by club, season and competition
| Club | Season | League | | | Cup | | Europe | | Other | | Total | |
| Club | Season | Division | Apps | Goals | Apps | Goals | Apps | Goals | Apps | Goals | Apps | Goals |
|---|---|---|---|---|---|---|---|---|---|---|---|---|
| Real Sociedad C | 2022–23 | Segunda Federación | 17 | 1 | — | | — | | — | | 17 | 1 |
| Real Sociedad B | 2023–24 | Primera Federación | 27 | 2 | — | | — | | — | | 27 | 2 |
| Real Sociedad B | 2024–25 | Primera Federación | 32 | 5 | — | | — | | 4 (Note: Appearances in 2025 Primera Federación play-offs) | 0 | 36 | 5 |
| Real Sociedad B | Total | | 59 | 7 | — | | — | | 4 | 0 | 63 | 7 |
| Real Sociedad | 2024–25 | La Liga | 0 | 0 | 1 | 0 | 0 | 0 | — | | 1 | 0 |
| Real Sociedad | 2025–26 | La Liga | 1 | 0 | — | | — | | — | | 1 | 0 |
| Real Sociedad | Total | | 1 | 0 | 1 | 0 | 0 | 0 | — | | 2 | 0 |
| Career total | | | 77 | 8 | 1 | 0 | 0 | 0 | 4 | 0 | 82 | 8 |
