= Climaco Rodríguez =

Uruguayan footballer

Personal information
- Full name: Clímaco Guillermo Rodríguez González
- Position: Defender

Senior career*
Years	Team	Apps	(Gls)
- Defensor Sporting
- Club Guaraní

International career
1958–1962	Uruguay	6	(0)
- * Club domestic league appearances and goals

Clímaco Guillermo Rodríguez González is a Uruguayan former footballer who played as a defender.

== Club career ==
Rodríguez played in his native Uruguay with Defensor Sporting and in Paraguay with Club Guaraní.

== Personal life ==
He is the uncle of former Uruguay international footballer Coquito and great-uncle of current Elche player Álvaro Rodríguez.

He is married to Isabel Rosalinda Rodríguez Rocha De Rodríguez. They have three children and eight grandchildren.
