= Coba da Costa =

Spanish footballer

Personal information
- Full name: Coba Gomes da Costa
- Date of birth: 26 July 2002 (age 24)
- Place of birth: La Mojonera, Spain
- Height: 1.82 m (6 ft 0 in)
- Position: Winger

Team information
- Current team: Al-Kholood
- Number: 11

Youth career
- 2011–2014: La Mojonera
- 2014–2016: Almería
- 2016–2018: La Cañada Atlético
- 2018–2020: La Mojonera
- 2020–2021: Maracena

Senior career*
Years	Team	Apps	(Gls)
2021	Maracena	7	(0)
2021–2022	Berja	26	(3)
2022	Tabor Sežana	13	(0)
2023–2024	Conquense	37	(8)
2024–2025	Getafe B	9	(3)
2024–2026	Getafe	33	(1)
2026	→ Anderlecht (loan)	5	(0)
2026–	Al-Kholood	0	(0)
- * Club domestic league appearances and goals as of 23 April 2026

Coba Gomes da Costa (born 26 July 2002), sometimes known as just Coba, is a Spanish professional footballer who plays as a left winger for Saudi side Al-Kholood Club.

== Career ==
Born in La Mojonera, Almería, Andalusia to Bissau-Guinean parents, Coba represented La Mojonera CF, UD Almería, UCD La Cañada Atlético and UD Maracena as a youth. He made his senior debut with the latter on 21 March 2021, coming on as a late substitute in a 2–1 Tercera División home win over CD Huétor Vega.

On 6 September 2021, Coba signed for CD El Ejido's farm team Berja CF in the División de Honor Andaluza. The following 18 July, after being regularly used, he moved abroad for the first time in his career and joined Slovenian PrvaLiga side NK Tabor Sežana.

Coba made his professional debut on 24 July 2022, replacing Tom Kljun late into a 1–0 home loss to NK Olimpija Ljubljana. On 29 November, after being replaced before half-time in a 1–1 away draw against NK Gorica, he refused to shake hands with manager Dušan Kosič, and subsequently left the club.

On 7 December 2022, Coba returned to his home country and joined UB Conquense in Tercera Federación. On 17 July 2024, after scoring a career-best seven goals as the club achieved promotion to Segunda Federación, he moved to Getafe CF and was assigned to the reserves also in the fourth division.

Coba made his first team debut with Geta on 26 November 2024, starting in a 3–0 away win over Manises CF, for the season's Copa del Rey. He made his La Liga debut on 1 December, replacing Mauro Arambarri at half-time in a 2–0 away loss to Real Madrid.

Coba subsequently started to feature regularly with the main squad, and scored his first professional goal on 12 January 2025, netting the opener in a 2–1 away win over UD Las Palmas. On 17 July, he renewed his contract until 2029 and was definitely promoted to the main squad.

On 2 February 2026, after losing his starting spot, Coba was loaned to RSC Anderlecht in Belgium until June, with a buyout clause. On 9 July, he was transferred to Saudi Pro League side Al-Kholood Club.

== Career statistics ==
As of match played 23 April 2026

Appearances and goals by club, season and competition
Club	Season	League			Cup		Europe		Other		Total	
Club	Season	Division	Apps	Goals	Apps	Goals	Apps	Goals	Apps	Goals	Apps	Goals
Maracena	2020–21	Tercera División	7	0	—		—		—		7	0
Berja	2021–22	Divisiones Regionales de Fútbol	26	3	—		—		—		26	3
Tabor Sežana	2022–23	Slovenian PrvaLiga	13	0	1	0	—		—		14	0
Conquense	2023–24	Tercera Federación	37	8	—		—		—		37	8
Getafe B	2024–25	Segunda Federación	9	3	—		—		—		9	3
Getafe	2024–25	La Liga	19	1	4	0	—		—		23	1
Getafe	2025–26	La Liga	14	0	2	0	—		—		16	0
Getafe	Total		33	1	6	0	—		—		39	1
Anderlecht (loan)	2025–26	Belgian Pro League	5	0	1	0	—		—		6	0
Career total			130	15	8	0	0	0	0	0	138	15
