= Nabil Aberdin =

French footballer (born 2002)

Personal information
- Date of birth: 23 August 2002 (age 24)
- Place of birth: Paris, France
- Height: 1.92 m (6 ft 4 in)
- Positions: Centre-back; defensive midfielder

Team information
- Current team: Farul Constanța (on loan from Sochi)
- Number: 5

Youth career
- –2020: Mountrouge 92
- 2020–2022: Aravaca

Senior career*
Years	Team	Apps	(Gls)
2021–2022	Paracuellos Antamira	24	(1)
2022–2023	Rayo Majadahonda	4	(0)
2023	→ Unionistas (loan)	0	(0)
2023–2025	Getafe B	24	(0)
2023–2025	Getafe	9	(0)
2025–	Sochi	19	(1)
2026	→ Al Jazira (loan)	5	(0)
2026–	→ Farul Constanța (loan)	4	(0)
- * Club domestic league appearances and goals as of 7 November 2026

Nabil Aberdin (Arabic: نبيل أبردين; born 23 August 2002) is a professional footballer who plays as a centre-back or a defensive midfielder for Liga I club Farul Constanța, on loan from Russian First League club Sochi.

Born in France, Aberdin chose to represent Morocco at international level.

== Career ==
Born in Paris to Moroccan parents, Aberdin played for Aravaca CF as a youth before signing for CF Rayo Majadahonda on 15 July 2021. He was initially assigned to farm team CD Paracuellos Antamira in Tercera División RFEF, making his senior debut on 12 September by starting in a 2–1 away win over AD Villaviciosa de Odón.

After being a first-choice, Aberdin was promoted to the first team of the Majariegos ahead of the 2022–23 season. On 31 January 2023, after being rarely used, he was loaned to fellow Primera Federación side Unionistas de Salamanca CF until June, but suffered a knee injury in February which left him sidelined for the remainder of the campaign.

After fully recovering, Aberdin was transferred to Getafe CF on 20 July 2023, being initially assigned to the B-team in Segunda Federación. He made his first team – and La Liga – debut on 18 May of the following year, starting in a 1–0 away loss to Deportivo Alavés.

On 9 February 2025, Aberdin signed with Sochi in Russia.

On 14 January 2026, Aberdin signed with Al Jazira in United Arab Emirates on loan.

== Career statistics ==
As of 7 November 2026

Club	Season	League			National cup (Note: Includes Copa del Rey, Russian Cup, UAE President's Cup)		Other		Total	
Club	Season	Division	Apps	Goals	Apps	Goals	Apps	Goals	Apps	Goals
Paracuellos Antamira	2021–22	Tercera Federación	24	1	–		1 (Note: Appearance in Tercera Federación promotion play-offs)	0	25	1
Rayo Majadahonda	2022–23	Primera Federación	4	0	0	0	–		4	0
Unionistas (loan)	2022–23	Primera Federación	0	0	–		–		0	0
Getafe B	2023–24	Segunda Federación	23	0	–		1 (Note: Appearance in Segunda Federación promotion play-offs)	0	24	0
Getafe B	2024–25	Segunda Federación	1	0	–		–		1	0
Getafe B	Total		24	0	–		1	0	25	0
Getafe	2023–24	La Liga	2	0	0	0	–		2	0
Getafe	2024–25	La Liga	7	0	2	0	–		9	0
Getafe	Total		9	0	2	0	–		11	0
Sochi	2024–25	Russian First League	12	1	–		2 (Note: Appearances in Russian Premier League promotion/relegation play-offs)	0	14	1
Sochi	2025–26	Russian Premier League	7	0	5	0	–		12	0
Sochi	2026–27	Russian First League	0	0	–		–		0	0
Sochi	Total		19	1	5	0	2	0	26	1
Al Jazira (loan)	2025–26	UAE Pro League	5	0	2	0	–		7	0
Farul Constanța (loan)	2026–27	Liga I	4	0	–		–		4	0
Career total			89	2	9	0	4	0	102	2
