= Beñat Turrientes =

Spanish footballer (born 2002)

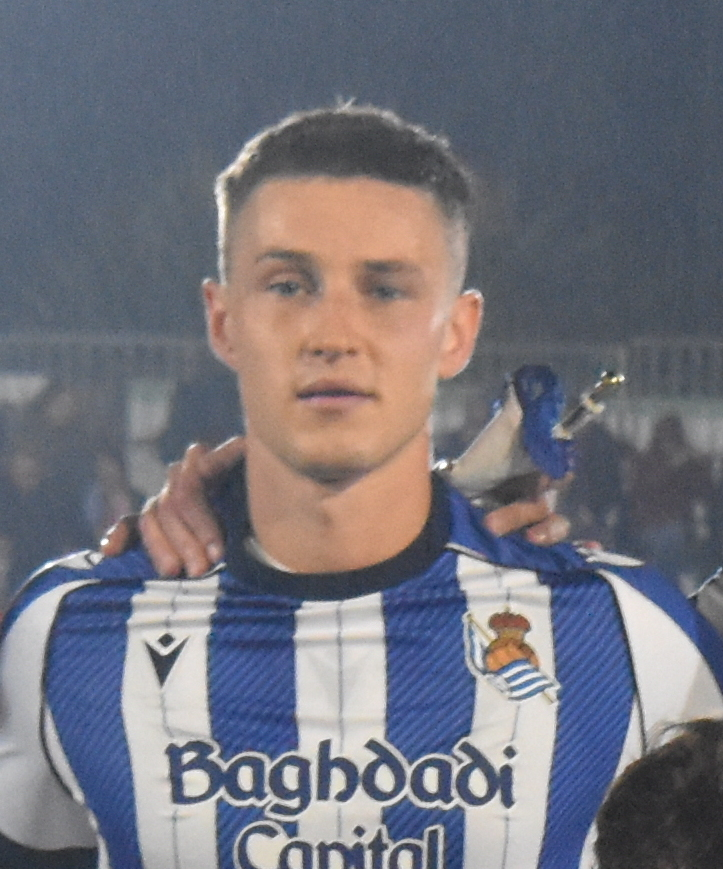
- Turrientes with Real Sociedad in 2025

Personal information
- Full name: Beñat Turrientes Imaz
- Date of birth: 31 January 2002 (age 24)
- Place of birth: Beasain, Spain
- Height: 1.81 m (5 ft 11 in)
- Position: Midfielder

Team information
- Current team: Real Sociedad
- Number: 8

Youth career
- 2014–2019: Real Sociedad

Senior career*
Years	Team	Apps	(Gls)
2019–2020	Real Sociedad C	17	(0)
2020–2022	Real Sociedad B	35	(0)
2021–	Real Sociedad	99	(1)

International career^{‡}
2019–2020	Spain U17	19	(1)
2019	Spain U18	4	(0)
2021–2025	Spain U21	29	(5)
2024	Spain U23	6	(0)
2026–	Spain	1	(0)
2026–	Basque Country	1	(0)
Medal record
Men's football
Representing Spain
Olympic Games
Gold medal – first place	2024 Paris
- * Club domestic league appearances and goals as of 23:01, 22 November 2026 (UTC) ‡ National team caps and goals as of 23:44, 14 November 2026 (UTC)

Beñat Turrientes Imaz (born 31 January 2002) is a Spanish professional footballer who plays as a midfielder for La Liga club Real Sociedad and the Spain national team.

== Club career ==
Born in Beasain, Gipuzkoa, Basque Country, Turrientes joined Real Sociedad's youth setup in 2014, aged 12. He made his senior debut with the C-team on 8 September 2019, starting in a 0–0 Tercera División home draw against CD Vitoria.

On 20 September 2019, Turrientes renewed his contract until 2025. Promoted to the reserves ahead of the 2020–21 campaign, he featured in 16 matches as the side returned to Segunda División after 59 years.

Turrientes made his professional debut on 21 August 2021, starting in a 0–0 away draw against CD Lugo. He made his first team – and La Liga – debut on 26 September, starting in a 1–0 home win over Elche CF.

On 7 August 2022, Turrientes was definitely promoted to the main squad, being assigned the number 22 jersey. In the 2023–24 season, he made 41 appearances in all competitions, including six in the UEFA Champions League as Real Sociedad reached the round of 16, and further extended his link until 2030 on 29 November 2024.

In 2025–26, Turrientes helped the Txuri-urdin win the Copa del Rey, the club's first major trophy during his senior career.

== International career ==
Turrientes represented Spain at several youth levels. He was part of the Spain under-23 squad that won the gold medal at the 2024 Summer Olympics, defeating hosts France 5–3 after extra time in the final.

Turrientes made his debut with the full side on 18 November 2025, in a friendly against Iraq.

== Career statistics ==
=== Club ===
As of match played 22 November 2026

Appearances and goals by club, season and competition
Club	Season	League			National cup		Europe		Other		Total	
Club	Season	Division	Apps	Goals	Apps	Goals	Apps	Goals	Apps	Goals	Apps	Goals
Real Sociedad C	2019–20	Tercera Federación	17	0	—		—		—		17	0
Real Sociedad B	2020–21	Segunda División B	15	0	—		—		1 (Note: Appearance in Segunda División play-offs)	0	16	0
Real Sociedad B	2021–22	Segunda División	20	0	—		—		—		21	0
Real Sociedad B	Total		35	0	—		—		1	0	36	0
Real Sociedad	2021–22	La Liga	8	0	1	1	4 (Note: Appearances in UEFA Europa League)	0	—		13	1
Real Sociedad	2022–23	La Liga	6	0	1	0	6	0	—		13	0
Real Sociedad	2023–24	La Liga	29	0	6	0	6 (Note: Appearances in UEFA Champions League)	0	—		41	0
Real Sociedad	2024–25	La Liga	21	0	3	0	7	0	—		31	0
Real Sociedad	2025–26	La Liga	27	0	7	3	—		—		34	3
Real Sociedad	2026–27	La Liga	8	1	0	0	3	1	0	0	11	2
Real Sociedad	Total		99	1	18	4	26	1	0	0	143	6
Career total			151	1	18	4	26	1	1	0	196	6

=== International ===
As of match played 4 June 2026

Appearances and goals by national team and year
National team	Year	Apps	Goals
Spain	2026	1	0
Total		1	0

== Honours ==
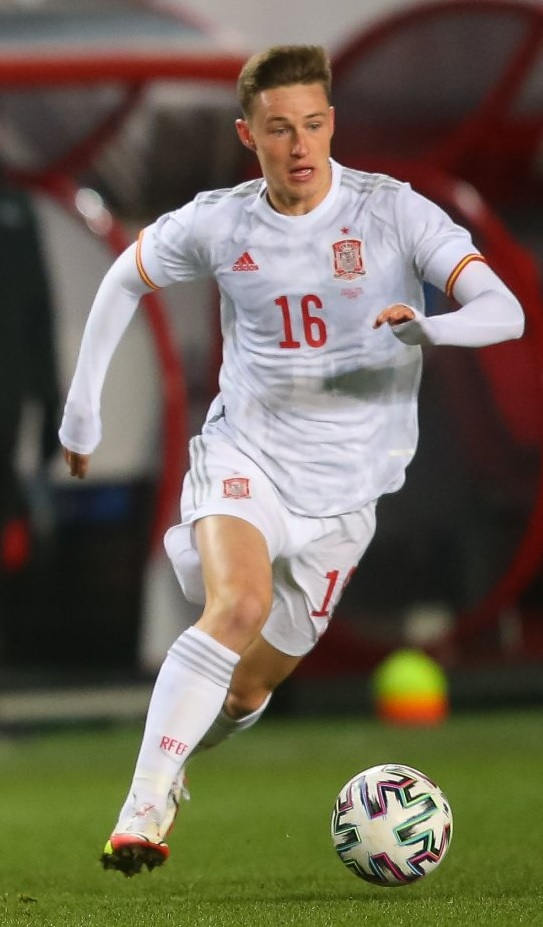
Turrientes with Spain U21 in 2021

Real Sociedad B

- Segunda División B: 2020–21

Real Sociedad

- Copa del Rey: 2025–26

Spain U23

- Summer Olympics gold medal: 2024
