= Coquito (footballer) =

Uruguayan footballer (1965–2026)

Personal information
- Full name: Daniel Gregorio Rodríguez Lima
- Date of birth: 22 December 1965
- Place of birth: Montevideo, Uruguay
- Date of death: 11 May 2026 (aged 60)
- Height: 1.80 m (5 ft 11 in)
- Position: Forward

Youth career
- Terremoto
- 1978–1980: Peñarol

Senior career*
Years	Team	Apps	(Gls)
1981–1987	Peñarol	146	(45)
1987–1988	Mandiyú	39	(15)
1988	Peñarol	12	(2)
1989	Rapid Wien	8	(3)
1989–1990	Palamós	22	(3)
1991–1992	Atlético Tucumán	35	(10)
1992–1993	Chaco For Ever	28	(11)
1993–1995	Deportivo Morón	62	(22)
Total		352	(111)

International career
1983–1985	Uruguay U20	16	(7)
- * Club domestic league appearances and goals

Daniel Gregorio Rodríguez Lima (22 December 1965 – 11 May 2026), known as Coquito, was a Uruguayan professional footballer who played as a forward.

== Club career ==
Having started his career in his native Uruguay with Peñarol, where he made his debut at the age of 15, Coquito embarked on a career which took him to Argentina, Austria and Spain.

== Personal life and death ==
Coquito was the father of footballer Álvaro Rodríguez. He was also the nephew of former Uruguay international footballer Climaco Rodríguez. Coquito died on 11 May 2026, at the age of 60.

== Honours ==
Peñarol

- Intercontinental Cup: 1982
- Copa Libertadores: 1982, 1987
- Uruguayan Primera División: 1981, 1982, 1985, 1986
- IFA Shield: 1985

Mandiyú

- Primera B Nacional: 1987–88
