= Álvaro Rodríguez (footballer, born 2004) =

Uruguayan footballer (born 2004)

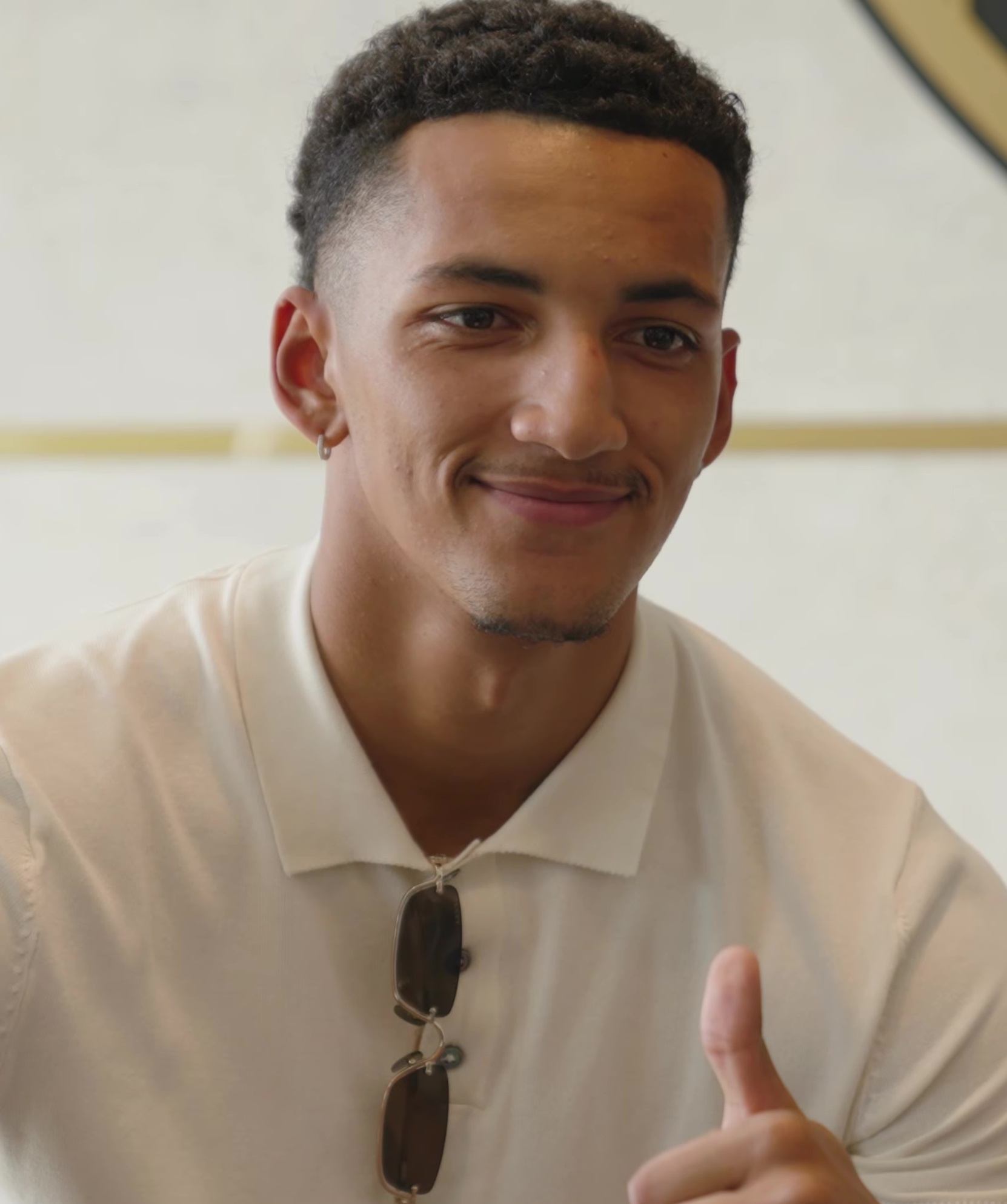
- Rodríguez in 2026

Personal information
- Full name: Álvaro Daniel Rodríguez Muñoz
- Date of birth: 14 July 2004 (age 22)
- Place of birth: Palamós, Spain
- Height: 1.93 m (6 ft 4 in)
- Position: Forward

Team information
- Current team: Bournemouth
- Number: 30

Youth career
- 2010–2014: Global Palamós
- 2014–2015: Gironès-Sàbat
- 2015–2020: Girona
- 2020–2022: Real Madrid

Senior career*
Years	Team	Apps	(Gls)
2021–2024	Real Madrid B	75	(21)
2023–2025	Real Madrid	7	(1)
2024–2025	→ Getafe (loan)	22	(2)
2025–2026	Elche	34	(7)
2026–	Bournemouth	4	(0)

International career
2022	Spain U18	4	(1)
2023	Uruguay U20	8	(5)
Medal record
Men's football
Representing Uruguay
South American U-20 Championship
Runner-up	2023 Colombia
- * Club domestic league appearances and goals as of 18 October 2026

Álvaro Daniel Rodríguez Muñoz (born 14 July 2004) is a professional footballer who plays as a forward for Premier League club Bournemouth. Born in Spain, he has represented both Spain and Uruguay at youth international level.

== Early life ==
Rodríguez was born on 14 July 2004 in Palamós, Girona, Catalonia. He is the son of former Uruguayan international footballer Coquito, and a Spanish mother. He is the grand-nephew of former Uruguayan international footballer Climaco Rodríguez.

== Club career ==
=== Early career ===
Rodríguez began his youth career at the age of six with local academy Global Palamós. After a year-long stint at Gironès-Sàbat, he joined the youth setup of Girona. After five years there, he would join La Fábrica at Real Madrid where he would go on to win the 2022 Copa del Rey Juvenil.

=== Real Madrid ===
After impressing with the Juvenil sides, Rodríguez made his senior debut for Real Madrid Castilla on 24 October 2021, coming on as a substitute in a 3–1 loss at Atlético Sanluqueño. He would make his first start for the reserve side on 8 January 2022, also scoring his first senior goal, in a 3–1 victory over Andorra.

Rodríguez received his first call-up to the senior side on 22 October 2022, remaining on the bench in a 3–1 victory over Sevilla in La Liga. He made his debut for the senior team on 3 January 2023 in a 1–0 Copa del Rey victory over Cacereño.

Rodríguez made his La Liga debut for Real Madrid in a 2–0 win against Osasuna on 19 February 2023 in which he made a late assist after another was ruled offside. On 25 February, he scored his first La Liga goal in a 1–1 draw against Atlético Madrid.

==== Loan to Getafe ====
On 29 August 2024, Rodríguez was sent out on loan to Getafe for the rest of 2024–25 season.

=== Elche ===
On 22 July 2025, Rodríguez signed a four-year contract with fellow top tier side Elche.

=== Bournemouth ===
On 14 July 2026, Rodríguez signed for Premier League club AFC Bournemouth on a long term deal for a fee of £21 million.

== International career ==
=== Spain ===
Born in Spain to a father from Uruguay, Rodríguez is eligible to represent both countries at the international level. He was included in the squad of the under-18 team for the 2022 Mediterranean Games. Rodríguez played all three games and scored one goal as the side finished last in their group.

=== Uruguay ===
In August 2022, Rodríguez officially switched and committed his international future to Uruguay. In January 2023, he was named in the squad for the 2023 South American U-20 Championship. He scored five goals in the tournament, helping Uruguay finish as runners-up. However, he was not included in the squad for the 2023 FIFA U-20 World Cup, as Real Madrid refused to release him. Uruguay went on to win the tournament, beating Italy 1–0 in the final.

In September 2026, Rodríguez was named in the preliminary squad of the Uruguay national team.

== Style of play ==
Rodríguez is a left-footed centre-forward renowned for his height, although he can also play out wide. Marca highlighted his reading of the game and his movement. He was also described as attacking space well, providing good runs for midfielders, working tirelessly, and not being afraid to put in a challenge for his side.

== Career statistics ==
As of match played 28 October 2026

Appearances and goals by club, season and competition
Club	Season	League			National cup (Note: Includes Copa del Rey, FA Cup)		League cup (Note: Includes EFL Cup)		Europe		Other		Total	
Club	Season	Division	Apps	Goals	Apps	Goals	Apps	Goals	Apps	Goals	Apps	Goals	Apps	Goals
Real Madrid Castilla	2021–22	Primera División RFEF	17	4	—		—		—		—		17	4
Real Madrid Castilla	2022–23	Primera Federación	24	7	—		—		—		4 (Note: Appearances in Primera Federación play-offs)	0	28	7
Real Madrid Castilla	2023–24	Primera Federación	34	10	—		—		—		—		34	10
Real Madrid Castilla	Total		75	21	—		—		—		4	0	79	21
Real Madrid	2022–23	La Liga	6	1	2	0	—		0	0	0	0	8	1
Real Madrid	2023–24	La Liga	1	0	1	0	—		0	0	0	0	2	0
Real Madrid	Total		7	1	3	0	—		0	0	0	0	10	1
Getafe (loan)	2024–25	La Liga	22	2	4	1	—		—		—		26	3
Elche	2025–26	La Liga	34	7	2	0	—		—		—		36	7
Bournemouth	2026–27	Premier League	4	0	0	0	2	1	3 (Note: Appearances in UEFA Europa League)	1	—		9	2
Career total			142	31	9	1	2	1	3	1	4	0	160	34

== Honours ==
Real Madrid U19

- Copa del Rey Juvenil: 2021–22

Real Madrid

- La Liga: 2023–24
- Copa del Rey: 2022–23
- UEFA Champions League: 2023–24
