= Ismael Bekhoucha =

Moroccan footballer (born 2004)

Personal information
- Full name: Ismael Bekhoucha Lemlal
- Date of birth: 20 November 2004 (age 21)
- Place of birth: Madrid, Spain
- Position: Right-back

Team information
- Current team: Extremadura

Youth career
- 2017–2019: Getafe
- 2019–2022: Alcorcón
- 2022–2023: RC Alcobendas

Senior career*
Years	Team	Apps	(Gls)
2023–2024	SS Reyes	30	(0)
2024–2026	Getafe B	55	(0)
2025–2026	Getafe	9	(0)
2026–	Extremadura	0	(0)
- * Club domestic league appearances and goals as of 7 May 2026

Ismael Bekhoucha Lemlal (born 20 November 2004) is a Spanish professional footballer who plays as a right-back for CD Extremadura.

== Career ==
Born in Madrid to Moroccan parents, Bekhoucha represented Getafe CF, AD Alcorcón and Rayo Ciudad Alcobendas CF as a youth. On 9 August 2023, after finishing his formation, he signed for Segunda Federación side UD San Sebastián de los Reyes.

Bekhoucha made his senior debut on 10 September 2023, starting in a 3–2 home loss to UD San Fernando. On 9 July of the following year, after being a regular starter for Sanse, he returned to Getafe on a four-year contract, and was initially assigned to the reserves also in the fourth division.

Bekhoucha made his first team – and La Liga – debut on 18 January 2025, coming on as a late substitute for Coba da Costa in a 1–1 home draw against FC Barcelona. On 25 August of the following year, he joined Primera Federación side CD Extremadura.
