= Mauro Arambarri =

Uruguayan footballer (born 1995)

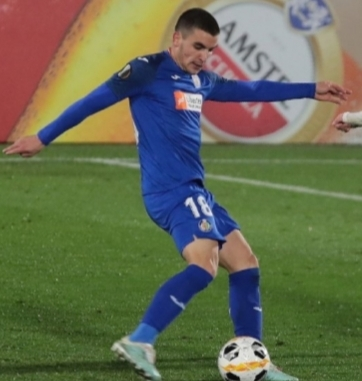
- Arambarri with Getafe in 2019

Personal information
- Full name: Mauro Wilney Arambarri Rosa
- Date of birth: 30 September 1995 (age 31)
- Place of birth: Salto, Uruguay
- Height: 1.75 m (5 ft 9 in)
- Position: Central midfielder

Team information
- Current team: River Plate
- Number: 8

Youth career
- Gladiador
- 2003–2010: Tropezón
- 2010: Nacional de Salto
- 2011–2013: Defensor Sporting

Senior career*
Years	Team	Apps	(Gls)
2013–2016	Defensor Sporting	44	(1)
2016–2017	Bordeaux	9	(0)
2016–2017	Bordeaux B	6	(0)
2017–2018	Boston River	0	(0)
2017–2018	→ Getafe (loan)	27	(1)
2018–2026	Getafe	225	(21)
2026–	River Plate	6	(0)

International career
2014–2015	Uruguay U20	19	(3)
2020–2022	Uruguay	12	(0)
Medal record
Representing Uruguay
South American U-20 Championship
Third place	2015 Uruguay
- * Club domestic league appearances and goals as of 19 September 2026

Mauro Wilney Arambarri Rosa (born 30 September 1995) is a Uruguayan professional footballer who plays as a central midfielder or defensive midfielder for Argentine Primera División club River Plate.

== Club career ==
=== Defensor Sporting ===
Arambarri was born in Salto, and joined Defensor Sporting's youth setup in 2011 after impressing in a local youth tournament. He was promoted to the first team in July 2013 by manager Tabaré Silva, and made his professional – and Primera División – debut on 15 September by starting in a 1–0 home win against Fénix.

Arambarri continued to feature regularly for La Viola in the following seasons, and scored his first senior goal on 21 March 2015 by netting the first in a 1–1 home draw against Cerro.

=== Bordeaux ===
On 31 January 2016, Arambarri signed a four-and-a-half-year contract with Ligue 1 side FC Girondins de Bordeaux. He made his debut for the club on 3 February, coming on as a second-half substitute for Valentin Vada in a 3–0 away loss against Olympique Lyonnais.

Arambarri was only rarely used by the club in the 2016–17 campaign, being limited to four league appearances, all from the bench.

=== Getafe ===
On 9 August 2017, after having his federative rights assigned to Boston River, Arambarri signed a one-year loan deal with La Liga club Getafe CF, with a buyout clause, which was activated on 11 June 2018. Arambarri signed a five-year contract.

== International career ==
Arambarri began his international career for Uruguay with under-20 team. He was part of Uruguay squad which finished third at 2015 South American U-20 Championship and reached pre-quarters of 2015 FIFA U-20 World Cup.

On 18 September 2020, Arambarri was included in Uruguay's 26-men preliminary squad for World Cup qualifying matches against Chile and Ecuador. He was later included in the final squad and made his senior debut on 8 October 2020 in Uruguay's 2–1 win against Chile.

== Career statistics ==
=== Club ===
As of match played 19 September 2026

Appearances and goals by club, season and competition
Club	Season	League			National cup (Note: Includes Coupe de France, Copa del Rey)		Continental (Note: Includes Copa Libertadores, Copa Sudamericana, UEFA Europa League)		Total	
Club	Season	Division	Apps	Goals	Apps	Goals	Apps	Goals	Apps	Goals
Defensor Sporting	2013–14	Uruguayan Primera División	12	0	—		—		12	0
Defensor Sporting	2014–15	Uruguayan Primera División	19	1	—		0	0	19	1
Defensor Sporting	2015–16	Uruguayan Primera División	13	0	—		8	0	21	0
Defensor Sporting	Total		44	1	—		8	0	52	1
Bordeaux B	2015–16	Championnat National 2	1	0	—		—		1	0
Bordeaux B	2016–17	Championnat National 3	5	0	—		—		5	0
Bordeaux B	Total		6	0	—		—		6	0
Bordeaux	2015–16	Ligue 1	5	0	0	0	—		5	0
Bordeaux	2016–17	Ligue 1	4	0	2	0	—		6	0
Bordeaux	2017–18	Ligue 1	0	0	0	0	1	0	1	0
Bordeaux	Total		9	0	2	0	1	0	12	0
Getafe (loan)	2017–18	La Liga	27	1	2	0	—		29	1
Getafe	2018–19	La Liga	33	1	3	0	—		36	1
Getafe	2019–20	La Liga	35	1	1	0	6	0	42	1
Getafe	2020–21	La Liga	34	3	1	0	—		35	3
Getafe	2021–22	La Liga	31	0	0	0	—		31	0
Getafe	2022–23	La Liga	13	0	0	0	—		13	0
Getafe	2023–24	La Liga	7	0	0	0	—		7	0
Getafe	2024–25	La Liga	35	10	2	0	—		37	10
Getafe	2025–26	La Liga	37	6	0	0	—		37	6
Getafe	Getafe total		252	22	9	0	6	0	267	22
River Plate	2026	Argentine Primera División	6	0	1	0	0	0	7	0
Career total			317	23	12	0	15	0	344	23

=== International ===
As of match played 11 June 2022

Appearances and goals by national team and year
National team	Year	Apps	Goals
Uruguay	2020	4	0
Uruguay	2021	4	0
Uruguay	2022	4	0
Total		12	0
