= 2026–27 Valencia CF season =

Valencia CF
2026–27 season
- Owner: Peter Lim
- President: Kiat Lim
- Head coach: Carlos Corberán (until 13 September 2026); Óscar Sánchez (caretaker; from 13 September); Javier Aguirre (from 23 September)
- Stadium: Mestalla Stadium
Home colours	Away colours	Third colours

The 2026–27 season is the 108th season in the history of Valencia CF and the club's 40th consecutive season in La Liga. In addition to the domestic league, the team is scheduled to participate in the Copa del Rey.

== Season summary ==
On 13 September 2026, the club announced that Carlos Corberán had been sacked, with Óscar Sánchez taking over as caretaker manager. On 23 September 2026, the club announced that Javier Aguirre had signed a contract until the end of the season, with the option of next season.

== Players ==
=== Current squad ===
As of 2 September 2026

Note: Flags indicate national team as defined under FIFA eligibility rules; some limited exceptions apply. Players may hold more than one non-FIFA nationality.

No.	Pos.	Nation	Player
1	GK	MKD	Stole Dimitrievski
2	MF	ARG	Guido Rodríguez
3	DF	ESP	José Copete
4	DF	GUI	Mouctar Diakhaby
5	DF	ESP	César Tárrega (3rd captain)
6	FW	NGR	Umar Sadiq
7	FW	NED	Arnaut Danjuma
8	MF	ESP	Javi Guerra
9	FW	ESP	Hugo Duro
10	FW	ENG	Harvey Elliott (on loan from Liverpool)
11	FW	ESP	Luis Rioja
12	DF	NED	Justin de Haas
13	GK	ESP	Cristian Rivero

No.	Pos.	Nation	Player
14	DF	ESP	José Gayà (captain)
15	MF	MLI	Aliou Dieng
16	FW	ESP	Diego López
18	MF	ESP	Pepelu (vice-captain)
19	FW	ESP	Dani Raba
20	DF	GLP	Dimitri Foulquier
21	DF	ESP	Jesús Vázquez
22	DF	ESP	Arnau Martínez
23	MF	SUI	Filip Ugrinić
24	DF	ARG	Pablo Maffeo (on loan from Olympiacos)
25	GK	NED	Kayne van Oevelen (on loan from Ipswich Town)
39	MF	JPN	Ryūnosuke Satō

== Transactions ==
=== Transfers in ===
Date	Pos.	Nat.	Name	Club	Fee	Ref.
7 July 2026	MF	(Mali)	Aliou Dieng	(Egypt) Al Ahly SC	Transfer	
7 July 2026	MF	(Japan)	Ryūnosuke Satō	(Japan) FC Tokyo	Transfer	
24 August 2026	DF	(Netherlands)	Justin de Haas	(Portugal) Famalicão	Transfer	
26 August 2026	DF	(Spain)	Arnau Martínez	(Spain) Girona	Transfer	

=== Loans in ===
Date	Pos.	Nat.	Name	Club	Duration	Ref.
20 August 2026	DF	(Spain)	Pablo Maffeo	(Greece) Olympiacos	End of season	
24 August 2026	GK	(Netherlands)	Kayne van Oevelen	(England) Ipswich Town	End of season	
1 September 2026	MF	(England)	Harvey Elliott	(England) Liverpool	End of season	

=== Transfers out ===
Date	Pos.	Nat.	Name	Club	Fee	Ref.
2 July 2026	DF	(Portugal)	Thierry Correia	(Italy) Venezia	Free transfer	
13 July 2026	MF	(France)	Baptiste Santamaria	(Greece) PAOK	Free transfer	
18 July 2026	DF	(Turkey)	Cenk Özkacar	(Turkey) Trabzonspor	Transfer	
30 July 2026	DF	(Switzerland)	Eray Cömert	(Italy) Torino	Free transfer	

== Competitions ==
=== La Liga ===
==== League table ====
Pos	Team	Pld	W	D	L	GF	GA	GD	Pts	Qualification or relegation
15	Rayo Vallecano	12	3	3	6	15	22	−7	12	
16	Getafe	12	3	3	6	8	18	−10	12	
17	Valencia	13	3	3	7	9	20	−11	12	
18	Levante	12	2	5	5	16	21	−5	11	Relegation to Segunda División
19	Elche	12	2	4	6	14	20	−6	10	Relegation to Segunda División

Updated to match(es) played on 22 November 2026. Source: LaLiga EA Sports
Rules for classification: 1) Points; 2) Head-to-head points; 3) Head-to-head goal difference; 4) Goal difference; 5) Goals scored; 6) Fair-play points (if three or more teams tied); 7) Play-off at neutral site.
(Note: Head-to-head record is used only after all the matches between the teams in question have been played)

==== Matches ====
22 August 2026 1	Valencia	0–0	Celta Vigo	Valencia
16:15 CEST (UTC+2)	de Haas (yellow card) 38'; Dimitrievski (yellow card) 39'		Carreira (yellow card) 57'; Rueda (yellow card) 67'; Radu (yellow card) 80'	Stadium: Mestalla Stadium; Attendance: 43,684; Referee: Jesús Gil Manzano

25 August 2026 2	Valencia	0–1	Real Betis	Valencia
21:00 CEST (UTC+2)	Satō (yellow card) 26'; Diakhaby (yellow card) 89'	Report	Firpo (yellow card) 42'; P. García 83'	Stadium: Mestalla; Attendance: 45,472; Referee: Jon Ander González Esteban

30 August 2026 3	Deportivo A Coruña	3–1	Valencia	A Coruña
19:30 CEST (UTC+2)	Tárrega 13' (o.g.); Aubameyang 17'; Diakhaby 59' (o.g.); Altimira (yellow card) 90+3' (yellow-red card) 90+3'		Sadiq 26'; Diakhaby (yellow card) 64'	Stadium: Estadio Riazor; Attendance: 29,077; Referee: Miguel Ángel Ortiz Arias

6 September 2026 4	Valencia	0–5	Barcelona	Valencia
16:15 CEST (UTC+2)	Martínez (yellow card) 81'	Report	Yamal 6', 84'; Fermín 22', (yellow card) 65'; Cubarsí (yellow card) 45+3'; Rodri (yellow card) 47'; Raphinha 50'; Pedri 79'	Stadium: Mestalla; Attendance: 47,319; Referee: Isidro Díaz de Mera Escuderos

11 September 2026 5	Sevilla	1–0	Valencia	Seville
21:00 CEST (UTC+2)	Ejuke (yellow card) 67'; Iglesias 81'	Report	Satō (yellow card) 27'; Maffeo (yellow card) 88'	Stadium: Ramón Sánchez-Pizjuán; Attendance: 39,939; Referee: Mateo Busquets Ferrer

15 September 2026 6	Deportivo Alavés	0–1	Valencia CF	Vitoria-Gasteiz
20:00 CEST (UTC+2)	Blanco (yellow card) 21'		Guerra (yellow card) 21'; Pepelu (yellow card) 45+2'; Mayol (yellow card) 52'; Rodríguez (yellow card) 61'; Rioja 78'	Stadium: Mendizorrotza Stadium; Attendance: 16,161; Referee: Miguel Sesma Espinosa

20 September 2026 7	Valencia	2–3	Real Sociedad	Valencia
21:00 CEST (UTC+2)	de Haas (yellow card) 11'; Gayà (yellow card) 12'; Mayol 57'; Beitia 84' (o.g.)	Report	Sučić 26', (yellow card) 54'; Soler 75' (pen.); Barrenetxea 90+1'; Óskarsson (yellow card) 90+6' (yellow-red card) 90+6'	Stadium: Mestalla; Attendance: 45,122; Referee: José Luis Munuera Montero

11 October 2026 8	Racing Santander	2–2	Valencia	Santander
21:00 CEST (UTC+2)	Ramón (yellow card) 22'; Zabiri 32'; Salinas (yellow card) 45+2'; I. Martín 47'; A. Martín (yellow card) 90+2'		Raba 2', (yellow card) 45+4'; Rodríguez (yellow card) 45+2'; Otorbi 65'; Maffeo (yellow card) 72'	Stadium: Estadio El Sardinero; Attendance: 22,633; Referee: Luis Bestard Servera

17 October 2026 9	Valencia	0–0	Athletic Bilbao	Valencia
21:00 CEST (UTC+2)	Raba (yellow card) 19'; Pepelu (yellow card) 87'; Tárrega (yellow card) 90'		Laporte (yellow card) 38'; Gerenabarrena (yellow card) 42'; de Galarreta (yellow card) 57'	Stadium: Mestalla Stadium; Attendance: 43,223; Referee: Adrián Cordero Vega

24 October 2026 10	Valencia	1–2	Villarreal	Valencia
18:30 CEST (UTC+2)	Raba (yellow card) 34'; Pepelu 38' (pen.); Maffeo (yellow card) 60'; Rodríguez (yellow card) 62'; Elliott (yellow card) 89' (yellow-red card) 89'		Veiga (yellow card) 37'; Pérez (yellow card) 43'; Buchanan (yellow card) 59'; Freeman 69'; Gueye (yellow card) 79' (red card); Mikautadze 90+6'	Stadium: Mestalla; Attendance: 46,580; Referee: Alejandro Quintero González

1 November 2026 11	Elche	0–1	Valencia	Elche
17:30 CET (UTC+1)	Valera (yellow card) 36'; Chust (yellow card) 42'; Buonanotte (yellow card) 62'		Sadiq 69'; Guerra (yellow card) 73'; Dimitrievski (yellow card) 90+1'	Stadium: Estadio Martínez Valero; Attendance: 28,360; Referee: Luis Bestard Servera

7 November 2026 12	Valencia	0–3	Real Madrid	Valencia
21:00 UTC+1	Maffeo (yellow card) 26'; Rodríguez (yellow card) 50'; Gayà (yellow card) 79' (red card); Rioja (yellow card) 80'; Pepelu (yellow card) 81'	Report	Valverde 28'; Güler 36'; Lunin (yellow card) 45'; Mbappé 75', (yellow card) 81'; Diomande (yellow card) 80'	Stadium: Mestalla; Attendance: 47,914; Referee: Francisco Hernández Maeso

22 November 2026 13	Rayo Vallecano	v	Valencia

29 November 2026 14	Valencia	v	CA Osasuna

6 December 2026 15	Getafe CF	v	Valencia

13 December 2026 16	Atlético Madrid	v	Valencia

20 December 2026 17	Valencia	v	RCD Espanyol

3 January 2027 18	Levante UD	v	Valencia

10 January 2027 19	Valencia	v	Málaga CF

17 January 2027 20	Celta	v	Valencia

24 January 2027 21	Valencia	v	Sevilla FC

31 January 2027 22	Barcelona	v	Valencia

7 February 2027 23	Valencia	v	Racing de Santander

14 February 2027 24	Valencia	v	Deportivo Alavés

21 February 2027 25	Villarreal	v	Valencia

28 February 2027 26	Real Madrid	v	Valencia

7 March 2027 27	Valencia	v	Levante

14 March 2027 28	Athletic Bilbao	v	Valencia

21 March 2027 29	Valencia	v	Deportivo de A Coruña

4 April 2027 30	Real Sociedad	v	Valencia

11 April 2027 31	Valencia	v	Getafe CF

18 April 2027 32	Málaga CF	v	Valencia

21 April 2027 33	Valencia	v	Rayo Vallecano

2 May 2027 34	Real Betis	v	Valencia

9 May 2027 35	Valencia	v	Atlético Madrid

16 May 2027 36	RCD Espanyol	v	Valencia

23 May 2027 37	Valencia	v	Elche CF

30 May 2027 38	Osasuna	v	Valencia

=== Copa del Rey ===
10 November 2026	Tavernes de la Valldigna	v	Valencia	Valencia (Note: Tavernes de la Valldigna will not play the match in their main stadium Municipal, Tavernes de la Valldigna, as it did not meet the broadcasting requirements.)
21:00		Report		Stadium: Mestalla
Note: Originally scheduled to 28 October 2026, the match was postponed due to a train collision in Urda.
