= 2024–25 Valencia CF season =

Valencia CF
2024–25 season
- Owner: Peter Lim
- President: Lay Hoon Chan (until 4 March); Kiat Lim (from 4 March)
- Head coach: Rubén Baraja (until 23 December); Carlos Corberán (from 24 December)
- Stadium: Mestalla
- La Liga: 12th
- Copa del Rey: Quarter-finals
- Top goalscorer: League: Hugo Duro (11); All: Hugo Duro (11)
- Highest home attendance: 46,673 vs Barcelona
- Lowest home attendance: 37,586 vs Alavés
- Average home league attendance: 43,042
Home colours	Away colours	Third colours

The 2024–25 season was the 106th season in the history of Valencia CF, and the club's 38th consecutive season in La Liga. In addition to the domestic league, the club participated in the Copa del Rey.

== Summary ==
Head coach Rubén Baraja's tenure was prolonged for another season on 19 June, extending his contract to 2026. On 23 December 2024, having achieved only two wins during the season, Baraja was sacked. The following day, former Valencia youth player Carlos Corberán signed a 3-year deal to become the new head coach.

== Players ==
=== First-team squad ===
As of 30 August 2024

No.	Pos.	Nat.	Player	Date of birth (age)	Signed in	Contract ends	Signed from
Goalkeepers
1	GK	(Spain)	Jaume Doménech	5 November 1990 (aged 34)	2015	2025	(Spain) Valencia Mestalla
13	GK	(North Macedonia)	Stole Dimitrievski	25 December 1993 (aged 31)	2024	2026	(Spain) Rayo Vallecano
25	GK	(Georgia (country))	Giorgi Mamardashvili	29 September 2000 (aged 24)	2021	2025	(Georgia (country)) Dinamo Tbilisi
Defenders
2	DF	(Belgium)	Maxi Caufriez	16 February 1997 (aged 28)	2024	2025	(France) Clermont
3	DF	(Spain)	Cristhian Mosquera	27 June 2004 (aged 21)	2021	2025	(Spain) Valencia Mestalla
4	DF	(Guinea)	Mouctar Diakhaby	19 December 1996 (aged 28)	2018	2027	(France) Lyon
12	DF	(Portugal)	Thierry Correia	9 March 1999 (aged 26)	2019	2026	(Portugal) Sporting CP
14	DF	(Spain)	José Gayà (captain)	25 May 1995 (aged 30)	2012	2027	(Spain) Valencia Mestalla
15	DF	(Spain)	César Tárrega	22 February 2002 (aged 23)	2021	2028	(Spain) Valencia Mestalla
20	DF	(Guadeloupe)	Dimitri Foulquier	23 March 1993 (aged 32)	2021	2025	(Spain) Granada
21	DF	(Spain)	Jesús Vázquez	2 January 2003 (aged 22)	2021	2025	(Spain) Valencia Mestalla
24	DF	(Spain)	Yarek	19 January 2005 (aged 20)	2023	2027	(Spain) Valencia Mestalla
Midfielders
5	MF	(Argentina)	Enzo Barrenechea	22 May 2001 (aged 24)	2024	2025	(England) Aston Villa
6	MF	(Spain)	Hugo Guillamón	31 January 2000 (aged 25)	2018	2026	(Spain) Valencia Mestalla
8	MF	(Spain)	Javi Guerra	13 May 2003 (aged 22)	2021	2027	(Spain) Valencia Mestalla
10	MF	(Portugal)	André Almeida	30 May 2000 (aged 25)	2022	2027	(Portugal) Vitória de Guimarães
16	MF	(Spain)	Diego López	13 May 2002 (aged 23)	2021	2026	(Spain) Valencia Mestalla
18	MF	(Spain)	Pepelu	11 August 1998 (aged 26)	2023	2028	(Spain) Levante
23	MF	(Spain)	Fran Pérez	9 September 2003 (aged 21)	2020	2026	(Spain) Valencia Mestalla
Forwards
7	FW	(Spain)	Sergi Canós	2 February 1997 (aged 28)	2023	2027	(England) Brentford
9	FW	(Spain)	Hugo Duro	10 November 1999 (aged 25)	2021	2026	(Spain) Getafe
11	FW	(Spain)	Rafa Mir	18 June 1997 (aged 28)	2024	2025	(Spain) Sevilla
17	FW	(Spain)	Dani Gómez	30 July 1998 (aged 26)	2024	2025	(Spain) Levante
22	FW	(Spain)	Luis Rioja	16 October 1993 (aged 31)	2024	2026	(Spain) Alavés
30	FW	(Spain)	Germán Valera	16 March 2002 (aged 23)	2024	2028	(Spain) Atlético Madrid

=== Reserve team ===
Note: Flags indicate national team as defined under FIFA eligibility rules; some limited exceptions apply. Players may hold more than one non-FIFA nationality.

No.	Pos.	Nation	Player
27	MF	ESP	David Otorbi
28	MF	GHA	Ali Fadal
29	DF	ESP	Álex Serradell
32	MF	ESP	Martín Tejón

No.	Pos.	Nation	Player
34	GK	ESP	Raúl Jiménez
38	DF	ESP	Iker Córdoba
39	DF	ESP	Rodrigo Abajas
42	FW	CRC	Warren Madrigal (on loan from Saprissa)

=== Out on loan ===
Note: Flags indicate national team as defined under FIFA eligibility rules; some limited exceptions apply. Players may hold more than one non-FIFA nationality.

No.	Pos.	Nation	Player
—	GK	ESP	Cristian Rivero (at Albacete until 30 June 2025)
—	DF	SUI	Eray Cömert (at Valladolid until 30 June 2025)
—	DF	TUR	Cenk Özkacar (at Valladolid until 30 June 2025)

No.	Pos.	Nation	Player
—	FW	ESP	Hugo González (at Cartagena until 30 June 2025)
—	FW	ESP	Alberto Marí (at Zaragoza until 30 June 2025)

== Transfers ==
=== In ===
Pos.	Player	Transferred from	Fee	Date	Source
DF	(Switzerland) Eray Cömert	(France) Nantes	Loan return	30 June 2024	
MF	(Spain) Samu Castillejo	(Italy) Sassuolo	Loan return	30 June 2024	
GK	(North Macedonia) Stole Dimitrievski	(Spain) Rayo Vallecano	Free	1 July 2024	
FW	(Spain) Rafa Mir	(Spain) Sevilla	Loan	11 July 2024	
FW	(Spain) Dani Gómez	(Spain) Levante	Loan	2 August 2024	
MF	(Spain) Luis Rioja	(Spain) Alavés	€1,500,000	22 August 2024	
DF	(Belgium) Maximiliano Caufriez	(France) Clermont	Loan	29 August 2024	
MF	(Spain) Germán Valera	(Spain) Atlético Madrid	Undisclosed	30 August 2024	
MF	(Argentina) Enzo Barrenechea	(England) Aston Villa	Loan	30 August 2024	
FW	(Nigeria) Umar Sadiq	(Spain) Real Sociedad	Loan	4 January 2025	

=== Out ===
Pos.	Player	Transferred to	Fee	Date	Source
FW	(Ukraine) Roman Yaremchuk	(Belgium) Club Brugge	End of loan	30 June 2024	
MF	(Morocco) Selim Amallah	(Spain) Valladolid	End of loan	30 June 2024	
GK	(Spain) Cristian Rivero	(Spain) Albacete	Loan	5 July 2024	
DF	(Switzerland) Eray Cömert	(Spain) Valladolid	Loan	10 July 2024	
FW	(Spain) Alberto Marí	(Spain) Zaragoza	Loan	30 August 2024	
MF	(Spain) Samu Castillejo		Contract termination	30 August 2024	

== Friendlies ==
=== Pre-season ===
20 July 2024 Friendly	Valencia	0–0	Castellón	Paterna
19:00 CEST (UTC+2)				Stadium: Ciudad Deportiva

24 July 2024 Friendly	Valencia	0–1	Alavés	Paterna
19:00 CEST (UTC+2)		Report	Conechny 53'	Stadium: Ciudad Deportiva

27 July 2024 Friendly	PSV Eindhoven	2–1	Valencia	Eindhoven, Netherlands
18:00 CEST (UTC+2)	Saibari 3', 24'	Report	Canos 18'	Stadium: Philips Stadion

31 July 2024 Friendly	Valencia	0–0	Levante	Paterna
19:00 CEST (UTC+2)		Report		Stadium: Ciudad Deportiva

3 August 2024 Friendly	Leeds United	2–1	Valencia	Leeds, England
15:00 BST (UTC+1)	Joseph 14'; Rutter 41'	Report	Tejón 89'	Stadium: Elland Road; Attendance: 32,973; Referee: James Bell (England)

10 August 2024 Orange Trophy	Valencia	3–2	Eintracht Frankfurt	Valencia
21:00 CEST (UTC+2)	Mir 4'; Duro 16'; Pepelu (penalty missed) 31'; Marí 88', (yellow card) 90+1'	Report	Marmoush 8' (pen.); Dina Ebimbe 72'; Nkounkou (yellow card) 90+1'	Stadium: Mestalla; Attendance: 25,000; Referee: José María Sánchez Martínez (Spain)

=== Mid-season ===
12 October 2024 Friendly	Mexico	2–2	Valencia	Puebla, Mexico
19:30 CST (UTC−6)	Vega 8'; Herrera 33'	Report	Gómez 43', 62'	Stadium: Estadio Cuauhtémoc; Referee: Juan Calderón (Costa Rica)

== Competitions ==
=== Overall record ===
Competition	First match	Last match	Starting round	Final position	Record							
Competition	First match	Last match	Starting round	Final position	Pld	W	D	L	GF	GA	GD	Win %
La Liga	17 August 2024	23–25 May 2025	Matchday 1		34	10	12	12	40	51	−11	29.41
Copa del Rey	26 November 2024	6 February 2025	First round	Quarter-finals	5	4	0	1	8	6	+2	80.00
Total					39	14	12	13	48	57	−9	35.90

Last updated: 23 April 2025
Source: Soccerway

=== La Liga ===
==== League table ====
Pos	Team	Pld	W	D	L	GF	GA	GD	Pts
10	Mallorca	38	13	9	16	35	44	−9	48
11	Real Sociedad	38	13	7	18	35	46	−11	46 (Note: Real Sociedad finished ahead of Valencia on head-to-head goal difference: Real Sociedad 3–0 Valencia, Valencia 1–0 Real Sociedad.)
12	Valencia	38	11	13	14	44	54	−10	46
13	Getafe	38	11	9	18	34	39	−5	42 (Note: Head-to-head points: Getafe 9, Espanyol 9, Alavés 0.)
14	Espanyol	38	11	9	18	40	51	−11	42

Source: LaLiga EA Sports
Rules for classification: 1) Points; 2) Head-to-head points; 3) Head-to-head goal difference; 4) Goal difference; 5) Goals scored; 6) Fair-play points
(Note: Head-to-head record is used only after all the matches between the teams in question have been played)

==== Results summary ====
Overall								Home						Away					
Pld	W	D	L	GF	GA	GD	Pts	W	D	L	GF	GA	GD	W	D	L	GF	GA	GD
35	11	12	12	43	53	−10	45	8	4	5	24	19	+5	3	8	7	19	34	−15

Last updated: 23 April 2025.
Source: La Liga

==== Results by round ====
Round	1	2	3	4	5	6	7	8	9	10	11	14^{1}	15	16	17	13	12	18	19	20	21	22	23	24	25	26	27	28	29	30	31	32	33	34
Ground	H	A	A	H	A	H	H	A	A	H	A	H	A	H	A	A	H	H	A	H	A	H	H	A	H	A	H	A	H	A	H	A	H	A
Result	L	L	L	D	L	W	D	L	D	L	D	W	L	L	L	D	D	L	D	W	D	W	W	D	L	D	W	D	W	W	W	D	D	W
Position	19	20	20	20	20	19	17	18	18	20	20	20	20	18	19	19	20	19	20	19	19	19	18	18	18	18	16	16	15	15	13	14	14	12

Updated to match(es) played on 23 April 2025. Source: La Liga
A = Away; H = Home; W = Win; D = Draw; L = Loss

==== Matches ====
The league schedule was released on 18 June 2024.

17 August 2024 1	Valencia	1–2	Barcelona	Valencia
21:30 CEST (UTC+2)	Pepelu (yellow card) 38'; Duro 44'; Vázquez (yellow card) 45+5'	Report	Cubarsí (yellow card) 45+2'; Lewandowski 45+5', 49' (pen.); Christensen (yellow card) 69'; Koundé (yellow card) 81'	Stadium: Mestalla; Attendance: 46,673; Referee: José María Sánchez Martínez

23 August 2024 2	Celta Vigo	3–1	Valencia	Vigo
19:00 CEST (UTC+2)	Mingueza 23', (yellow card) 25'; Aspas 28'; Beltrán 60'; Rodríguez (yellow card) 78'; Bamba (yellow card) 88'	Report	López 14'	Stadium: Balaídos; Attendance: 23,519; Referee: José Luis Munuera Montero

28 August 2024 3	Athletic Bilbao	1–0	Valencia	Bilbao
19:00 CEST (UTC+2)	Prados 45', (yellow card) 69'	Report	Mir (yellow card) 23'; Mosquera (yellow card) 26'; Foulquier (yellow card) 90+3'	Stadium: San Mamés; Attendance: 48,644; Referee: Pablo González Fuertes

31 August 2024 4	Valencia	1–1	Villarreal	Valencia
21:30 CEST (UTC+2)	Duro 24', (yellow card) 39'; Pepelu (yellow card) 51'; Guillamón (yellow card) 62'	Report	Pino (yellow card) 42'; Pérez 45+4'; Gueye (yellow card) 50' (yellow-red card) 68'; Femenía (yellow card) 77'; Albiol (yellow card) 83'	Stadium: Mestalla; Attendance: 43,857; Referee: Jesús Gil Manzano

15 September 2024 5	Atlético Madrid	3–0	Valencia	Madrid
21:00 CEST (UTC+2)	Koke (yellow card) 25'; Gallagher 39'; Griezmann 54'; Alvarez 90+4'	Report	Tárrega (yellow card) 10'; Guillamón (yellow card) 32'	Stadium: Cívitas Metropolitano; Attendance: 61,752; Referee: César Soto Grado

21 September 2024 6	Valencia	2–0	Girona	Valencia
18:30 CEST (UTC+2)	Rioja 56'; Gómez 58'; Pepelu (yellow card) 60'; Guerra (yellow card) 82'; Canós (yellow card) 89'	Report	Juanpe (yellow card) 24'; Danjuma (yellow card) 45'	Stadium: Mestalla; Attendance: 40,896; Referee: Alejandro Hernández Hernández

24 September 2024 7	Valencia	0–0	Osasuna	Valencia
19:00 CEST (UTC+2)	Mosquera (yellow card) 45+2'; Vázquez (yellow card) 68'	Report	Torró (yellow card) 54'; Herrando (yellow card) 70'; Budimir (yellow card) 90'	Stadium: Mestalla; Attendance: 40,425; Referee: Miguel Ángel Ortiz Arias

28 September 2024 8	Real Sociedad	3–0	Valencia	San Sebastián
18:30 CEST (UTC+2)	Kubo 8'; Óskarsson 80', 90+2'	Report		Stadium: Reale Arena; Attendance: 32,332; Referee: Javier Alberola Rojas

4 October 2024 9	Leganés	0–0	Valencia	Leganés
21:00 CEST (UTC+2)	Rosier (yellow card) 30'; Neyou (yellow card) 49'	Report	Tárrega (yellow card) 32'; Pepelu (yellow card) 67'	Stadium: Butarque; Attendance: 10,958; Referee: Alejandro Quintero González

21 October 2024 10	Valencia	2–3	Las Palmas	Valencia
21:00 CEST (UTC+2)	Rioja (yellow card) 8'; Pepelu 14' (pen.), (red card) 69'; Abajas (yellow card) 30'; Barrenechea (yellow card) 37'; Tárrega 90+4'	Report	Silva (yellow card) 7', (goal) 53'; Campaña (yellow card) 12'; Essugo (yellow card) 23'; Viti (yellow card) 28'; Á. Muñoz 43'; Cardona (yellow card) 70'; Rodríguez (yellow card) 71'; Suárez (yellow card) 77'; J. Muñoz (yellow card) 82'; Moleiro 84', (yellow card) 90+8'	Stadium: Mestalla; Attendance: 42,453; Referee: Jesús Gil Manzano

27 October 2024 11	Getafe	1–1	Valencia	Getafe
16:15 CET (UTC+1)	Pérez (yellow card) 44'; Arambarri 90' (pen.); Nyom (yellow card) 90+2'; Djené (yellow card) 90+2'	Report	Barrenechea 36', (yellow card) 67'; Mosquera (yellow card) 41'; López (yellow card) 42'; Correia (yellow card) 45+1'; Rioja (yellow card) 54'; Foulquier (yellow card) 65'; Duro (yellow card) 88'	Stadium: Coliseum; Attendance: 12,412; Referee: Guillermo Cuadra Fernández

23 November 2024 14	Valencia	4–2	Real Betis	Valencia
14:00 CET (UTC+1)	Tárrega 8', (yellow card) 90+5'; Barrenechea (yellow card) 20'; Duro 50', 53'; López 56'; Almeida (yellow card) 86'; Gayà (yellow card) 90'; Tárrega (yellow card) 90+5'	Report	Duro 14' (o.g.); Ávila 66'; Bakambu (yellow card) 88'; Sabaly (yellow card) 90'	Stadium: Mestalla; Attendance: 43,975; Referee: Ricardo de Burgos Bengoetxea

29 November 2024 15	Mallorca	2–1	Valencia	Palma
21:00 CET (UTC+1)	Larin 45+3'; Valjent (yellow card) 71'; Abdón 81'	Report	Rioja 32' (pen.), (yellow card) 62'	Stadium: Estadi Mallorca Son Moix; Attendance: 17,717; Referee: Alejandro Quintero González

7 December 2024 16	Valencia	0–1	Rayo Vallecano	Valencia
18:30 CET (UTC+1)	Mamardashvili (yellow card) 52'; Gasiorowski (yellow card) 72'	Report	Ciss 7'; Nteka (yellow card) 52'; Palazón (yellow card) 71'	Stadium: Mestalla; Attendance: 40,968; Referee: José Luis Munuera Montero

13 December 2024 17	Valladolid	1–0	Valencia	Valladolid
21:00 CET (UTC+1)	Anuar 20', (yellow card) 90+6'; Pérez (yellow card) 55'; Marcos André (yellow card) 67'; Latasa (red card) 78'; Sánchez (yellow card) 82'	Report	Vázquez (yellow card) 28'; Mir (yellow card) 86'; Canós (yellow card) 90+8'	Stadium: José Zorrilla; Attendance: 18,449; Referee: Miguel Ángel Ortiz Arias

18 December 2024 13	Espanyol	1–1	Valencia	Cornellà de Llobregat
21:30 CET (UTC+1)	Puado 44'; El Hilali (yellow card) 63'	Report	López 47'	Stadium: RCDE Stadium; Attendance: 18,122; Referee: Pablo González Fuertes

22 December 2024 18	Valencia	2–2	Alavés	Valencia
14:00 CET (UTC+1)	Rioja 70' (pen.); Mosquera (yellow card) 86'; Gómez 90+8'; Pepelu (yellow card) 90+12'	Report	Martín 7', (yellow card) 22'; Jordán 88' (pen.)	Stadium: Mestalla; Attendance: 37,586; Referee: Javier Alberola Rojas

3 January 2025 12	Valencia	1–2	Real Madrid	Valencia
21:00 CET (UTC+1)	Duro 27'; Canos (yellow card) 69'; Dimitrievski (yellow card) 78'	Report	Ceballos (yellow card) 36'; Bellingham (penalty missed) 55', 90+6'; Vázquez (yellow card) 78'; Vinícius (red card) 79'; Modrić 85', (yellow card) 87'	Stadium: Mestalla; Attendance: 46,420; Referee: César Soto Grado
Note: The match was originally scheduled for 2 November 2024, but was postponed due to the 2024 Spanish floods.

11 January 2025 19	Sevilla	1–1	Valencia	Seville
21:00 CET (UTC+1)	Sow (yellow card) 70'; Pedrosa 90+3'	Report	Foulquier (yellow card) 34'; Rioja 61'; Sadiq (yellow card) 75'	Stadium: Ramón Sánchez Pizjuán; Attendance: 34,297; Referee: Francisco José Hernández Maeso

19 January 2025 20	Valencia	1–0	Real Sociedad	Valencia
21:00 CET (UTC+1)	Duro 26', (yellow card) 87'; Mosquera (yellow card) 90+4'; Foulquier (yellow card) 90+6'	Report	Pacheco (yellow card) 42'; López (yellow card) 49'; Gómez (yellow card) 89'; Zubimendi (yellow card) 90+4'	Stadium: Mestalla; Attendance: 40,791; Referee: Víctor García Verdura

26 January 2025 21	Barcelona	7–1	Valencia	Barcelona
21:00 CET (UTC+1)	De Jong 3'; Torres 8'; Raphinha 14'; López 24', 45+4'; Lewandowski 66'; Tárrega 75' (o.g.)	Report	Duro 59'; Pepelu (yellow card) 70'	Stadium: Estadi Olímpic Lluís Companys; Attendance: 45,312; Referee: César Soto Grado

2 February 2025 22	Valencia	2–1	Celta Vigo	Valencia
16:15 CET (UTC+1)	Rioja 44'; Barrenechea (yellow card) 67'; Guerra 68'	Report	Durán 65'; Moriba (yellow card) 67'; Starfelt (yellow card) 83'	Stadium: Mestalla; Attendance: 42,273; Referee: Pablo González Fuertes

9 February 2025 23	Valencia	2–0	Leganés	Valencia
16:15 CEST (UTC+2)	Barrenechea (yellow card) 25'; Mosquera 30'; Diakhaby 41'	Report	Neyou (yellow card) 23'	Stadium: Mestalla; Attendance: 42,314; Referee: Guillermo Cuadra Fernández

15 February 2025 24	Villarreal	1–1	Valencia	Villarreal
21:00 CET (UTC+1)	Gueye 32'	Report	López (yellow card) 47'; Gayà (yellow card) 48'; Sadiq 84', (yellow card) 90+3'; Pepelu (yellow card) 87'; Pérez (yellow card) 90+4'	Stadium: Estadio de la Cerámica; Attendance: 19,701; Referee: Ricardo de Burgos Bengoetxea

22 February 2025 25	Valencia	0–3	Atlético Madrid	Valencia
18:30 CET (UTC+1)	Guerra (yellow card) 42'	Report	Alvarez 12', 30'; Correa 86'; Lino (yellow card) 23'; Lenglet (yellow card) 40'; Galán (yellow card) 64'	Stadium: Mestalla; Attendance: 46,297; Referee: Mateo Busquets Ferrer

2 March 2025 26	Osasuna	3–3	Valencia	Pamplona
20:00 CET (UTC+1)	Oroz 26', 39'; Budimir 45' (pen.); Torró (yellow card) 77'; Muñoz (yellow card) 80'	Report	López 14'; Sadiq 32', 87'; Rioja (yellow card) 68'	Stadium: El Sadar; Attendance: 19,230; Referee: Mario Melero López

8 March 2025 27	Valencia	2–1	Valladolid	Valencia
18:30 CET (UTC+1)	López 7'; Sadiq 58'; Gayà (yellow card) 84'	Report	Grillitsch (yellow card) 8'; Latasa 40', (yellow card) 66'; Sánchez (yellow card) 87'	Stadium: Mestalla; Attendance: 41,720; Referee: Juan Luis Pulido Santana

15 March 2025 28	Girona	1–1	Valencia	Girona
21:00 CET (UTC+1)	Herrera (yellow card) 18'; Stuani 64'; Van de Beek (yellow card) 90+3'	Report	López 58'; Gayà (yellow card) 67'	Stadium: Montilivi; Attendance: 10,262; Referee: José Munuera Montero

30 March 2025 29	Valencia	1–0	Mallorca	Valencia
18:30 CEST (UTC+2)	López 50'; Rioja (yellow card) 84'; Barrenechea (yellow card) 85'; Foulquier (yellow card) 90+4'; Gayà (yellow card) 90+7'	Report	Raíllo (yellow card) 12'; Darder (yellow card) 45+1'; Costa (yellow card) 76'; Rodríguez (yellow card) 90+10'	Stadium: Mestalla; Attendance: 44,082; Referee: Francisco José Hernández Maeso

5 April 2025 30	Real Madrid	1–2	Valencia	Madrid
16:15 CEST (UTC+2)	Vinícius (penalty missed) 13', 50'	Report	Tárrega (yellow card) 10'; Diakhaby 15'; Sadiq (yellow card) 46'; Duro 90+5'; Aarons (yellow card) 90+5'; Mosquera (yellow card) 90+8'	Stadium: Santiago Bernabéu; Attendance: 75,382; Referee: Guillermo Cuadra Fernández

11 April 2025 31	Valencia	1–0	Sevilla	Valencia
21:00 CEST (UTC+2)	Guerra 45+4', (yellow card) 46'; Foulquier (yellow card) 79'; Gayà (yellow card) 81'	Report	Salas (yellow card) 72'; Carmona (yellow card) 73'	Stadium: Mestalla; Attendance: 45,618; Referee: José María Sánchez Martínez

19 April 2025 32	Rayo Vallecano	1–1	Valencia	Madrid
14:00 CEST (UTC+2)	Ciss (yellow card) 28'; Tárrega 45' (o.g.); Lejeune (yellow card) 49'; Chavarría (yellow card) 82'	Report	Sadiq 75', (yellow card) 90'	Stadium: Vallecas; Attendance: 11,308; Referee: Alejandro Quintero González

22 April 2025 33	Valencia	1–1	Espanyol	Valencia
19:00 CEST (UTC+2)	Almeida (yellow card) 39'; Tárrega (yellow card) 45+2'; Guerra 57'	Report	Romero (yellow card) 31'; Puado 40'	Stadium: Mestalla; Attendance: 42,448; Referee: Juan Luis Pulido Santana

3 May 2025 34	Las Palmas	2–3	Valencia	Las Palmas
17:30 WEST (UTC+1)	Sandro 45+2' (pen.); Bajcetic (yellow card) 76'; McBurnie 83'	Report	Duro 22', 58'; Guerra (yellow card) 26'; Suárez 75' (o.g.)	Stadium: Gran Canaria; Attendance: 24,942; Referee: Ricardo de Burgos Bengoetxea

=== Copa del Rey ===
26 November 2024 First round	Parla Escuela	0–1	Valencia	Parla
19:00 CET (UTC+1)	Almendros (yellow card) 79'		Pepelu 20'	Stadium: Las Américas; Referee: Mario Melero López

4 December 2024 Second round	Ejea	1–3	Valencia	Ejea
21:00	Iglesias (yellow card) 42'; Palmás 71'	Report	Córdoba 49'; Valera (yellow card) 60'; Gómez 63'; Mir 90+1'	Stadium: Luchán

7 January 2025 Round of 32	Eldense	0–2	Valencia	Elda
21:00	Piña (yellow card) 33'; Collado (yellow card) 35'	Report	Canos 9'; Guillamón (yellow card) 37'; López 39', (yellow card) 41'; Dimitrievski (yellow card) 68'; Sadiq (yellow card) 90+2'	Stadium: Nuevo Pepico Amat; Referee: Guillermo Cuadra Fernández

14 January 2025 Round of 16	Ourense	0–2	Valencia	Ourense
21:00	Prado (yellow card) 90+5'	Report	Carmona 50' (o.g.); Sadiq 78'	Stadium: O Couto; Referee: Miguel Ángel Ortiz Arias

6 February 2025 Quarter-finals	Valencia	0–5	Barcelona	Valencia
21:30 CET (UTC+1)	Pérez (yellow card) 45+1'; Sadiq (yellow card) 45+1'	Report	Torres 3', 17', 30'; López 23'; Yamal 59'	Stadium: Mestalla; Attendance: 46,806; Referee: Miguel Ángel Ortiz Arias
