= 2022–23 Valencia CF season =

Valencia
2022–23 season
- Owner: Peter Lim
- President: Lay Hoon Chan
- Head coach: Gennaro Gattuso (until 30 January); Voro (interim, from 31 January to 14 February); Rubén Baraja (from 14 February)
- Stadium: Mestalla
- La Liga: 16th
- Copa del Rey: Quarter-finals
- Supercopa de España: Semi-finals
- Top goalscorer: League: Justin Kluivert; Samuel Lino (6 each); All: Justin Kluivert; Samuel Lino (8 each)
- Highest home attendance: 46,007 vs Barcelona
- Lowest home attendance: 38,725 vs Getafe
- Biggest win: Valencia 5–1 Getafe; Sporting Gijón 0–4 Valencia
- Biggest defeat: Atlético Madrid 3–0 Valencia
Home colours	Away colours	Third colours

The 2022–23 season was the 104th season in the history of Valencia CF and their 36th consecutive season in the top flight. The club participated in La Liga, the Copa del Rey and the Supercopa de España.

== Players ==
=== La Liga squad information ===
No.	Pos.	Nat.	Player	Date of birth (age)	Signed in	Contract ends	Last club
Goalkeepers
1	GK	(Spain)	Jaume Doménech	5 November 1990 (aged 32)	2015	2024	(Spain) Valencia Mestalla
13	GK	(Spain)	Cristian Rivero	21 March 1998 (aged 25)	2019	2024	(Spain) Alcorcón
25	GK	(Georgia (country))	Giorgi Mamardashvili	29 September 2000 (aged 22)	2021	2027	(Georgia (country)) Dinamo Tbilisi
	GK	(Spain)	Iago Herrerín	25 January 1988 (aged 35)	2022	2023	(Saudi Arabia) Al Raed
Defenders
2	DF	(Portugal)	Thierry Correia	9 March 1999 (aged 24)	2019	2026	(Portugal) Sporting CP
3	DF	(Spain)	Toni Lato	21 October 1997 (aged 25)	2017	2023	(Spain) Valencia Mestalla
5	DF	(Brazil)	Gabriel Paulista	26 December 1990 (aged 32)	2017	2024	(England) Arsenal
6	DF	(Spain)	Hugo Guillamón	31 January 2000 (aged 23)	2018	2026	(Spain) Valencia Mestalla
12	DF	(Guinea) (France)	Mouctar Diakhaby	19 December 1996 (aged 26)	2018	2027	(France) Lyon
14	DF	(Spain)	José Gayà (captain)	25 May 1995 (aged 28)	2012	2027	(Spain) Valencia Mestalla
15	DF	(Turkey)	Cenk Özkacar	6 October 2000 (aged 22)	2022	2028	(France) Lyon
20	DF	(Guadeloupe) (France)	Dimitri Foulquier	23 March 1993 (aged 30)	2021	2025	(Spain) Granada
21	DF	(Spain)	Jesús Vázquez	2 January 2003 (aged 20)	2021	2025	(Spain) Valencia Mestalla
24	DF	(Switzerland)	Eray Cömert	4 February 1998 (aged 25)	2022	2025	(Switzerland) Basel
Midfielders
4	MF	(United States)	Yunus Musah	29 November 2002 (aged 20)	2019	2026	(Spain) Valencia Mestalla
8	MF	(Guinea)	Ilaix Moriba	19 January 2003 (aged 20)	2022	2023	(Germany) RB Leipzig
11	MF	(Spain)	Samu Castillejo	18 January 1995 (aged 28)	2022	2025	(Italy) Milan
16	MF	(Brazil)	Samuel Lino	23 December 1999 (aged 23)	2022	2023	(Spain) Atlético Madrid
17	MF	(Spain)	Nico González	3 January 2002 (aged 21)	2022	2023	(Spain) Barcelona
18	MF	(Portugal)	André Almeida	30 May 2000 (aged 23)	2022	2027	(Portugal) Vitória de Guimarães
Forwards
7	FW	(Uruguay)	Edinson Cavani	14 February 1987 (aged 36)	2022	2024	(England) Manchester United
9	FW	(Netherlands)	Justin Kluivert	5 May 1999 (aged 24)	2022	2023	(France) Nice
19	FW	(Spain)	Hugo Duro	10 November 1999 (aged 23)	2021	2026	(Spain) Getafe
22	FW	(Brazil)	Marcos André	20 October 1996 (aged 26)	2021	2026	(Spain) Valladolid
Players who left the club during season
9	FW	(Uruguay)	Maxi Gómez	14 August 1996 (aged 26)	2019	2024	(Spain) Celta Vigo
10	MF	(Spain)	Carlos Soler	2 January 1997 (aged 25)	2016	2023	(Spain) Valencia Mestalla
21	FW	(Spain)	Manu Vallejo	14 February 1997 (aged 25)	2019	2024	(Spain) Alavés
Players who were loaned out during season
8	MF	(Serbia)	Uroš Račić	17 March 1998 (aged 24)	2018	2024	(Serbia) Red Star Belgrade
18	MF	(New Caledonia)	Koba Koindredi	27 October 2001 (aged 20)	2021	2025	(France) Lens Reserve
	DF	(Spain)	Jorge Sáenz	7 November 1996 (aged 25)		2024	(Spain) Mirandés

=== Reserve squad information ===
No.	Pos.	Nat.	Player	Date of birth (age)	Signed in	Contract ends	Last club
Goalkeepers
26	GK	(Spain)	Charlie Pérez	7 June 2002 (aged 21)	2021	2023	(Spain) Valencia Mestalla
42	GK	(Spain)	Emilio Bernad	22 September 1999 (aged 23)	2022		(Spain) Sabadell
Defenders
33	DF	(Spain)	Cristhian Mosquera	27 June 2004 (aged 19)	2021	2025	(Spain) Valencia Mestalla
34	DF	(Spain)	Rubén Iranzo	14 March 2003 (aged 20)	2021	2025	(Spain) Valencia Mestalla
	DF	(Spain)	Simón Luca Pérez	2 November 1999 (aged 23)	2022	2024	(Spain) Rayo Cantabria
	DF	(Spain)	Iván Muñoz	27 February 2002 (aged 21)	2021	2023	(Spain) Valencia Mestalla
38	DF	(Spain)	César Tárrega	26 February 2002 (aged 21)	2021	20283	(Spain) Atlético Levante
	DF	(Uruguay)	Facundo González	6 July 2003 (aged 19)	2020	2023	(Spain) Espanyol Cantera
Midfielders
29	MF	(Spain)	Fran Pérez	9 September 2003 (aged 19)	2020	2023	(Spain) Valencia Mestalla
35	MF	(Spain)	Yellu	24 May 2004 (aged 19)	2018	2026	(Spain) Torre Pacheco
36	MF	(Spain)	Javi Guerra	13 May 2003 (aged 20)	2021	2027	(Spain) Valencia Mestalla
	MF	(Spain)	Vicente Esquerdo	2 January 1999 (aged 24)	2018	2024	(Spain) Ciudad de Benidorm Youth
31	MF	(Spain)	Hugo González	7 February 2003 (aged 20)	2021	2024	(Spain) Valencia Mestalla
	MF	(Spain)	Adrián Gómez	27 October 2001 (aged 21)	2019	2023	(Poland) Podbeskidzie Bielsko-Biała
	MF	(Spain)	Hugo González Sotos	27 February 2003 (aged 20)	2020	2024	(Spain) Valencia Mestalla
	MF	(Spain)	Martí Soler	1 January 1998 (aged 25)	2022	2023	(Spain) Terrassa
	MF	(Spain)	Darío Serra	20 January 2003 (aged 20)	2022	2023	(Spain) Valencia Mestalla
Forwards
40	FW	(Spain)	Diego López	13 May 2002 (aged 21)	2021	2024	(Spain) Barcelona U19
	FW	(Spain)	Pablo Gozálbez	30 April 2001 (aged 22)	2019	2023	(Spain) Valencia Mestalla
46	FW	(Spain)	Alberto Marí	11 July 2001 (aged 21)	2021	2024	(Spain) Vitoria
Players who left the club during season
	DF	(Spain)	Joseda Menargues	1 May 2002 (aged 20)	2020	2024	(Spain) Valencia Mestalla
Players who were loaned out during season
	MF	(Spain)	Victor Esquerdo	15 July 2003 (aged 19)	2018	2024	(Spain) Valencia Mestalla
	MF	(Spain)	Miguel Arilla	9 January 2003 (aged 19)	2022	2023	(Spain) Valencia Mestalla
	MF	(Peru)	Alessandro Burlamaqui	18 February 2002 (aged 20)	2021	2024	(Spain) Espanyol Cantera

== Transfers ==
=== In ===
No.	Pos.	Player	Transferred from	Fee	Date	Source
	DF	(Spain) Jorge Sáenz	(Spain) Mirandés	Loan return	1 July 2022	
21	MF	(Spain) Manu Vallejo	(Spain) Alavés	Loan return	1 July 2022	
25	GK	(Spain) Cristian Rivero	(Spain) Alcorcón	Loan return	1 July 2022	
26	MF	(Spain) Vicente Esquerdo	(Spain) Castellón	Loan return	1 July 2022	
29	DF	(Argentina) Kevin Sibille	(Spain) Castellón	Loan return	1 July 2022	
19	FW	(Spain) Hugo Duro	(Spain) Getafe	€4M	1 July 2022	
11	MF	(Spain) Samu Castillejo	(Italy) Milan	Undisclosed	12 July 2022	
16	MF	(Brazil) Samuel Lino	(Spain) Atlético Madrid	Season loan	29 July 2022	
17	MF	(Spain) Nico González	(Spain) Barcelona	Season loan	13 August 2022	
15	DF	(Turkey) Cenk Özkacar	(France) Lyon	Season loan with €5m buy option	23 August 2022	
18	MF	(Portugal) André Almeida	(Portugal) Vitória	€7.5M	26 August 2022	
7	FW	(Uruguay) Edinson Cavani	(England) Manchester United	Free	29 August 2022	
9	MF	(Netherlands) Justin Kluivert	(Italy) Roma	Season loan with €15m buy option	31 August 2022	
8	MF	(Guinea) Ilaix Moriba	(Germany) RB Leipzig	Season loan	31 August 2022	
	GK	(Spain) Iago Herrerín	(Saudi Arabia) Al Raed	Free	28 September 2022	
15	DF	(Turkey) Cenk Özkacar	(France) Lyon	€5m	9 June 2023	
Total				€11,500,000		

=== Out ===
No.	Pos.	Player	Transferred to	Fee	Date	Source
11	FW	(Angola) Hélder Costa	(England) Leeds United	Loan return	1 July 2022	
23	MF	(Guinea) Ilaix Moriba	(Germany) RB Leipzig	Loan return (Note: Return to club for another season loan on 31 August 2022)	1 July 2022	
21	MF	(Spain) Bryan Gil	(England) Tottenham Hotspur	Loan return	1 July 2022	
15	DF	(Paraguay) Omar Alderete	(Germany) Hertha BSC	Loan return	1 July 2022	
29	DF	(Argentina) Kevin Sibille	(Spain) Atlético Baleares	Free	1 July 2022	
17	MF	(Russia) Denis Cheryshev	(Italy) Venezia (Note: Join Venezia on 31 August 2022 after being released at end of contract)	Free	1 July 2022	
	GK	(Spain) Juanjo Garrancho	(Spain)	Free	1 July 2022	
	DF	(Spain) Marc Ferris	(Spain) Teruel	Free	1 July 2022	
	DF	(Spain) David Ruiz	(Spain) RSC Internacional	Free	1 July 2022	
	FW	(France) Noha Ndombasi	(Spain)	Free	1 July 2022	
	FW	(Ghana) Bashiru Mohammed	(Spain) CF Talavera (Note: Join CF Talavera on 18 July 2022)	Free	1 July 2022	
13	GK	(Netherlands) Jasper Cillessen	(Netherlands) NEC Nijmegen	Undisclosed	8 August 2022	
7	FW	(Portugal) Gonçalo Guedes	(England) Wolverhampton Wanderers	€41.5M (Note: Fee may eventually rise to €41,500,000, due to undisclosed bonuses)	9 August 2022	
21	MF	(Spain) Manu Vallejo	(Spain) Girona	Free	31 August 2022	
9	MF	(Uruguay) Maxi Gómez	(Turkey) Trabzonspor	€3M	31 August 2022	
10	MF	(Spain) Carlos Soler	(France) Paris Saint-Germain	€21M (Note: Fee may eventually rise to €21,000,000, due to undisclosed bonuses)	31 August 2022	
	MF	(Spain) Pedro Alemañ	(Netherlands) Sparta Rotterdam	Free Transfer	1 January 2023	
	MF	(Spain) Joseda Menargues	(Spain) UD Ibiza	Free Transfer	2 January 2023	
Total				€65,500,000		

=== Loaned out ===
No.	Pos.	Player	Transferred to	Fee	Date	Source
	DF	(Spain) Jorge Sáenz	(Spain) Leganés	Season loan	5 July 2022	
	MF	(Peru) Alessandro Burlamaqui	(Spain) Badajoz	Season loan	19 July 2022	
	MF	(Spain) Miguel Arilla	(Spain) Torrent	Season loan	12 August 2022	
	MF	(Spain) Víctor Esquerdo	(Spain) Hércules B	Season loan	18 August 2022	
18	MF	(New Caledonia) Koba Koindredi	(Spain) Oviedo	Season loan	26 August 2022	
8	MF	(Serbia) Uroš Račić	(Portugal) Braga	Season loan with €5m buy option	31 August 2022	
	DF	(Spain) Izan Llinares	(Spain) Torrent	Season loan	1 September 2022	

=== Extension ===
Position	Player	Note
GK	(Georgia (country)) Giorgi Mamardashvili	5-year contract signed until 2027
DF	(Guinea) (France) Mouctar Diakhaby	5-year contract signed until 2027
DF	(Spain) Hugo Guillamón	4-year contract signed until 2026
MF	(Spain) Javi Guerra	5-year contract signed until 2027

== Pre-season and friendlies ==
Win Draw Loss Fixtures

18 July 2022 Friendly	Borussia Dortmund (Germany)	1–3	(Spain) Valencia	Altach, Austria
19:00 CEST (UTC+2)	Reus 51' (pen.)	Report	Guedes 40', 62'; Marcos André 58'	Stadium: Stadion Schnabelholz; Referee: Walter Altmann (Austria)

20 July 2022 Friendly	St. Gallen (Switzerland)	0–2	(Spain) Valencia	Gossau, Switzerland
19:00 CEST (UTC+2)	Witzig (yellow card) 51'; Quintillà (yellow card) 75'; Kräuchi (yellow card) 90'	Report	Koindredi 54'; Musah (yellow card) 75'; Marcos André (yellow card) 85'; Guedes 88'	Stadium: Sportanlage Buechenwald; Referee: Fedayi San (Switzerland)

23 July 2022 Friendly	VfB Stuttgart (Germany)	5–2	(Spain) Valencia	Stuttgart, Germany
15:30 CEST (UTC+2)	Tomás 16', 44'; Silas 46'; Perea 58'; Churlinov 90'	Report	Marcos André 34', 55'; Cömert (yellow card) 48'; Correia (yellow card) 65'; Račić (yellow card) 74'	Stadium: Mercedes-Benz Arena; Referee: Martin Petersen (Germany)

30 July 2022 Friendly	Nottingham Forest (England)	1–1	(Spain) Valencia	Nottingham, England
19:00 CEST (UTC+2)	O'Brien (yellow card) 53'; Williams (yellow card) 71'; Johnson 83'	Report	Soler 42'; Diakhaby (yellow card) 75'	Stadium: Meadow Lane

3 August 2022 Friendly	Castellón (Spain)	1–0	(Spain) Valencia	Castellon, Spain
20:45 CEST (UTC+2)	Koné 15'	Report		Stadium: Castàlia; Attendance: 7,500

6 August 2022 Orange Trophy	Valencia (Spain)	2–1	(Italy) Atalanta	Valencia
21:00 CEST (UTC+2)	Duro 43', 81'	Report	Éderson 53'	Stadium: Mestalla; Referee: Antonio Mateu Lahoz (Spain)

9 December 2022 Friendly	Valencia (Spain)	4–2	(France) Clermont	Valencia
14:00 CET (UTC+1)	Lino 22'; Castillejo 58', 82'; Kluivert 90'	Report	Kyei 73'; Khaoui 75'	Stadium: Ciudad Deportiva de Paterna; Referee: Escriche Guzmán (Spain)

16 December 2022 Friendly	Valencia (Spain)	1–2	(England) Nottingham Forest	Valencia
19:30 CET (UTC+1)				Stadium: Mestalla

22 December 2022 Friendly	Valencia (Spain)	1–3	(Netherlands) AZ	Valencia
12:00 CET (UTC+1)				Stadium: Ciudad Deportiva de Paterna; Attendance: 0

== Competitions ==
=== Overall record ===
Competition	First match	Last match	Starting round	Final position	Record							
Competition	First match	Last match	Starting round	Final position	Pld	W	D	L	GF	GA	GD	Win %
La Liga	14 August 2022	4 June 2023	Matchday 1	16th	38	11	9	18	42	45	−3	28.95
Copa del Rey	3 January 2023	26 January 2023	Round of 32	Quarter-finals	3	2	0	1	8	3	+5	66.67
Supercopa de España	11 January 2023		Semi-finals	Semi-finals	1	0	1	0	1	1	+0	0.00
Total					42	13	10	19	51	49	+2	30.95

Source: Soccerway

=== La Liga ===
==== League table ====
Pos	Team	Pld	W	D	L	GF	GA	GD	Pts	Qualification or relegation
14	Cádiz	38	10	12	16	30	53	−23	42 (Note: Head-to-head points: Cádiz 8, Getafe 5, Valencia 3.)	
15	Getafe	38	10	12	16	34	45	−11	42	
16	Valencia	38	11	9	18	42	45	−3	42	
17	Almería	38	11	8	19	49	65	−16	41	
18	Valladolid (R)	38	11	7	20	33	63	−30	40	Relegation to Segunda División

Source: LaLiga Santander
Rules for classification: 1) Points; 2) Head-to-head points; 3) Head-to-head goal difference; 4) Goal difference; 5) Goals scored; 6) Fair-play points (Note: Head-to-head record is used only after all the matches between the teams in question have been played)
(R) Relegated

==== Results summary ====
Overall								Home						Away					
Pld	W	D	L	GF	GA	GD	Pts	W	D	L	GF	GA	GD	W	D	L	GF	GA	GD
38	11	9	18	42	45	−3	42	8	5	6	27	19	+8	3	4	12	15	26	−11

Source: La Liga

==== Results by round ====
Round	1	2	3	4	5	6	7	8	9	10	11	12	13	14	15	16	17	18	19	20	21	22	23	24	25	26	27	28	29	30	31	32	33	34	35	36	37	38
Ground	H	A	H	H	A	H	A	A	H	A	H	H	A	H	A	H	A	H	A	A	H	A	H	A	H	A	H	A	H	A	H	A	H	A	H	A	H	A
Result	W	L	L	W	L	W	D	W	D	D	L	L	D	W	L	L	L	D	L	L	L	L	W	L	W	L	D	L	L	W	W	L	D	W	W	L	D	D
Position	7	10	14	10	12	9	9	7	8	8	9	10	11	10	10	11	12	12	14	17	18	19	18	19	17	18	17	18	18	18	16	17	17	14	13	13	15	16

Source: La Liga
A = Away; H = Home; W = Win; D = Draw; L = Loss

==== Matches ====
The league fixtures were announced on 23 June 2022.

14 August 2022 1	Valencia	1–0	Girona	Valencia
19:30 CEST (UTC+2)	Soler 45+1' (pen.); Cömert (red card) 52'; Correia (yellow card) 56'; Vázquez (yellow card) 69'	Report	Couto (yellow card) 14'; Terrats (yellow card) 44'; Valery (yellow card) 45'	Stadium: Mestalla; Attendance: 39,359; Referee: Jorge Figueroa Vázquez

21 August 2022 2	Athletic Bilbao	1–0	Valencia	Bilbao
17:30 CEST (UTC+2)	Berenguer 42'; Vivian (yellow card) 12'; Muniain (yellow card) 68'; Simón (yellow card) 79'; Berchiche (yellow card) 86'; Yeray (yellow card) 89'	Report	Musah (yellow card) 23'; Diakhaby (yellow card) 73'	Stadium: San Mamés; Attendance: 43,333; Referee: César Soto Grado

29 August 2022 3	Valencia	0–1	Atlético Madrid	Valencia
22:00 CEST (UTC+2)	Marcos André (yellow card) 18'; Correia (yellow card) 42'; Cömert (yellow card) 76'; Pérez (yellow card) 83'	Report	Saúl (yellow card) 14'; Mandava (yellow card) 27'; Félix (yellow card) 55'; Griezmann 66'	Stadium: Mestalla; Attendance: 43,910; Referee: Guillermo Cuadra Fernández

4 September 2022 4	Valencia	5–1	Getafe	Valencia
21:00 CEST (UTC+2)	Lato 7'; Lino 14'; Castillejo 16', (yellow card) 45'; González 65'; Duro 68'; Moriba (yellow card) 75' (yellow-red card) 88'	Report	Aleñá (yellow card) 10'; Arambarri (yellow card) 41' (yellow-red card) 90+5'; Mayoral (yellow card) 54'; Munir (yellow card) 57'; Mitrović (yellow card) 71'; Álvarez 78'	Stadium: Mestalla; Attendance: 38,725; Referee: José Luis Munuera Montero

10 September 2022 5	Rayo Vallecano	2–1	Valencia	Madrid
14:00 CEST (UTC+2)	Palazón 5', (yellow card) 35'; Balliu (yellow card) 21'; González 52' (o.g.); Dimitrievski (yellow card) 62'; Comesaña (yellow card) 63'; Trejo (yellow card) 70'	Report	Musah (yellow card) 68'; Diakhaby 90+3'; Correia (yellow card) 90+4'	Stadium: Campo de Fútbol de Vallecas; Attendance: 12,085; Referee: Jesús Gil Manzano

17 September 2022 6	Valencia	3–0	Celta Vigo	Valencia
18:30 CEST (UTC+2)	Guillamón (yellow card) 16'; Castillejo 37', (yellow card) 69'; Lino (yellow card) 55'; Marcos André 82'; Almeida 90+3'	Report	Beltrán (yellow card) 52'; Cervi (red card) 59'; Veiga (yellow card) 78'	Stadium: Mestalla; Attendance: 40,965; Referee: Pablo González Fuertes

2 October 2022 7	Espanyol	2–2	Valencia	Cornellà de Llobregat
14:00 CEST (UTC+2)	Joselu 56'; Darder (yellow card) 58', (goal) 83'; Oliván (yellow card) 76'; Braithwaite (red card) 90+2'	Report	Gabriel 53'; Marcos André (red card) 85'; Cömert 90+6'; Diakhaby (yellow card) 90+8'	Stadium: RCDE Stadium; Attendance: 19,766; Referee: Valentín Pizarro Gómez

7 October 2022 8	Osasuna	1–2	Valencia	Pamplona
21:00 CEST (UTC+2)	Ávila (penalty missed) 57'; Torró (yellow card) 64'; U. García (red card) 69'; Brašanac (yellow card) 83', (goal) 90+3'; Peña (red card) 90+6'; Herrera (yellow card) 90+7'	Report	Kluivert 28'; Guillamón (yellow card) 38'; Diakhaby 54', (yellow card) 84' (yellow-red card) 90+1'; Moriba (yellow card) 57'; Cavani (penalty missed) 70'; Musah (yellow card) 73'; Cömert (yellow card) 79'	Stadium: El Sadar; Attendance: 20,260; Referee: Miguel Ángel Ortiz Arias

15 October 2022 9	Valencia	2–2	Elche	Valencia
16:15 CEST (UTC+2)	Mamardashvili (yellow card) 26'; Cömert (yellow card) 37'; Cavani 41' (pen.), 45+7'; Musah (yellow card) 73'	Report	Milla 29' (pen.), 65', (yellow card) 78'; Palacios (yellow card) 36'; Josan (yellow card) 39'; N. Fernández (yellow card) 69'; Badía (yellow card) 88'; Morente (yellow card) 90+6'	Stadium: Mestalla; Attendance: 41,805; Referee: Juan Luis Pulido Santana

18 October 2022 10	Sevilla	1–1	Valencia	Seville
19:00 CEST (UTC+2)	Delaney (yellow card) 64'; Salas (yellow card) 79', (red card) 90+11'; Lamela 86'; Rakitić (yellow card) 90+4'; Gómez (yellow card) 90+11'	Report	Cavani 6'; Lino (yellow card) 59'; Foulquier (yellow card) 63'; González (yellow card) 79'; Kluivert (yellow card) 85'; Diakhaby (yellow card) 90+4'; Marcos André (yellow card) 90+4'; Gayà (yellow card) 90+7', (penalty missed) 90+12'	Stadium: Ramón Sánchez Pizjuán; Attendance: 37,353; Referee: César Soto Grado

22 October 2022 11	Valencia	1–2	Mallorca	Valencia
18:30 CEST (UTC+2)	Cavani 52' (pen.); Gabriel (yellow card) 65'; Musah (yellow card) 70'; Guillamón (yellow card) 90+1'	Report	Battaglia (yellow card) 15'; Muriqi (yellow card) 60', (goal) 66' (pen.); Lee Kang-in 83'; Ruiz de Galarreta (yellow card) 86'; Rodríguez (yellow card) 90+2'; Raíllo (yellow card) 90+2'	Stadium: Mestalla; Attendance: 41,199; Referee: José María Sánchez Martínez

29 October 2022 12	Valencia	0–1	Barcelona	Valencia
21:00 CEST (UTC+2)	Lino (yellow card) 67'; Guillamón (yellow card) 84'; Foulquier (yellow card) 90+7'; Castillejo (yellow card) 90+7'	Report	Alonso (yellow card) 21'; García (yellow card) 45'; Gavi (yellow card) 89'; Piqué (yellow card) 90+2'; Lewandowski 90+3'; Torres (yellow card) 90+7'	Stadium: Mestalla; Attendance: 46,007; Referee: Ricardo de Burgos Bengoetxea

6 November 2022 13	Real Sociedad	1–1	Valencia	San Sebastián
16:15 CET (UTC+1)	Rico (yellow card) 8'; Guillamón 10' (o.g.); Elustondo (red card) 17'; Zubimendi (yellow card) 90'	Report	Lino 25'	Stadium: Anoeta; Attendance: 32,773; Referee: José Luis Munuera Montero

10 November 2022 14	Valencia	3–0	Real Betis	Valencia
20:00 CET (UTC+1)	Castillejo (yellow card) 33'; Almeida 63'; Guillamón 81' (pen.); Kluivert 90+3'	Report	González (yellow card) 52' (yellow-red card) 61'; Akouokou (yellow card) 67'	Stadium: Mestalla; Attendance: 39,876; Referee: Ángel Ortiz Arias

31 December 2022 15	Villarreal	2–1	Valencia	Villarreal
16:15 CET (UTC+1)	Chukwueze 45'; Foyth (yellow card) 80', (goal) 88'	Report	Cavani 21', (yellow card) 90+3'; Musah (yellow card) 35'; Cömert (yellow card) 56'; Moriba (yellow card) 73'	Stadium: Estadio de la Cerámica; Attendance: 19,247; Referee: José María Sánchez Martínez

6 January 2023 16	Valencia	0–1	Cádiz	Valencia
21:00 CET (UTC+1)	Cavani (yellow card) 34'; Kluivert (yellow card) 52'; Gayà (yellow card) 62'; Duro (yellow card) 65'; Musah (yellow card) 81'	Report	Alcaraz 9'; Sobrino (yellow card) 20'; Fali (yellow card) 34'; Ocampo (yellow card) 56'; Hernández (yellow card) 60'; Iza (yellow card) 65'; Alejo (yellow card) 78'	Stadium: Mestalla; Attendance: 39,703; Referee: Pablo González Fuertes

23 January 2023 18	Valencia	2–2	Almería	Valencia
21:00 CET (UTC+1)	Cavani (yellow card) 45'; Kluivert 48'; Gayà 65'; Almeida (yellow card) 84'	Report	Ramazani (penalty missed) 44'; Chumi 54'; Portillo 74'; Melero (yellow card) 80'	Stadium: Mestalla; Attendance: 33,507; Referee: Jesús Gil Manzano

29 January 2023 19	Valladolid	1–0	Valencia	Valladolid
14:00 CET (UTC+1)	Sánchez (yellow card) 45+2'; Aguado (yellow card) 56'; Mesa (yellow card) 69'; Larin 90'	Report	Almeida (yellow card) 13'	Stadium: José Zorilla; Attendance: 19,675; Referee: Jorge Figueroa Vázquez

2 February 2023 17	Real Madrid	2–0	Valencia	Madrid
21:00 CET (UTC+1)	Nacho (yellow card) 33'; Benzema (yellow card) 45+5'; Asensio 52', (yellow card) 62'; Vinícius 55'	Report	Diakhaby (yellow card) 60'; Gabriel (red card) 72'	Stadium: Santiago Bernabéu; Attendance: 51,926; Referee: Javier Alberola Rojas
Note: The match date was pushed back due to both teams' involvement in the Supercopa de España.

5 February 2023 20	Girona	1–0	Valencia	Girona
16:15 CET (UTC+1)	B. García 63'; Stuani (yellow card) 79'	Report	Guillamón (yellow card) 61'; Gayà (yellow card) 66'; Cavani (yellow card) 66'; Özkacar (yellow card) 90+3'	Stadium: Montilivi; Attendance: 10,732; Referee: Javier Iglesias Villanueva

11 February 2023 21	Valencia	1–2	Athletic Bilbao	Valencia
21:00 CET (UTC+1)	Castillejo 17', (yellow card) 61'; Duro (yellow card) 21'	Report	N. Williams 30', (yellow card) 41'; De Marcos (yellow card) 57'; Sancet 72'	Stadium: Mestalla; Attendance: 36,688; Referee: César Soto Grado

20 February 2023 22	Getafe	1–0	Valencia	Getafe
21:00 CET (UTC+1)	Djené (yellow card) 21'; Villar (yellow card) 30'; Álvarez (yellow card) 73'; Alderete (yellow card) 76'; Mayoral 82', (yellow card) 82'; Portu (yellow card) 88'	Report	Duro (yellow card) 89'	Stadium: Coliseum Alfonso Pérez; Attendance: 10,112; Referee: Mario Melero López

25 February 2023 23	Valencia	1–0	Real Sociedad	Valencia
21:00 CET (UTC+1)	Foulquier (yellow card) 11'; Zubeldia 40' (o.g.); Musah (yellow card) 45'; Castillejo (yellow card) 55'; Lato (yellow card) 67'; Mamardashvili (yellow card) 69'; Gabriel (yellow card) 90+7'	Report	Zubimendi (yellow card) 4'; Rico (yellow card) 36'; Fernández (yellow card) 90+8'	Stadium: Mestalla; Attendance: 37,465; Referee: Alejandro Hernández Hernández

5 March 2023 24	Barcelona	1–0	Valencia	Barcelona
16:15 CET (UTC+1)	Raphinha 15'; Torres (penalty missed) 55'; Araújo (red card) 59'	Report		Stadium: Camp Nou; Attendance: 89,644; Referee: Javier Alberola Rojas

11 March 2023 25	Valencia	1–0	Osasuna	Valencia
21:00 CET (UTC+1)	Duro (yellow card) 71', (penalty missed) 90+1'; Kluivert 74'; Gayà (yellow card) 90+6'	Report	D. García (yellow card) 3'; Cruz (yellow card) 16'; Ávila (yellow card) 36'; Torró (yellow card) 68'; Oroz (yellow card) 87'	Stadium: Mestalla; Attendance: 37,762; Referee: Javier Iglesias Villanueva

18 March 2023 26	Atlético Madrid	3–0	Valencia	Madrid
21:00 CET (UTC+1)	Griezmann (yellow card) 4', (goal) 23'; Llorente (yellow card) 42'; Carrasco 49'; Lemar 67'	Report		Stadium: Cívitas Metropolitano; Attendance: 58,317; Referee: José Luis Munuera Montero

3 April 2023 27	Valencia	1–1	Rayo Vallecano	Valencia
21:00 CEST (UTC+2)	Correia (yellow card) 27'; Kluivert (yellow card) 36', (goal) 82' (pen.)	Report	Comesaña 9'; Valentín (yellow card) 23'; Balliu (yellow card) 81'; Catena (yellow card) 90+7'	Stadium: Mestalla; Attendance: 39,769; Referee: Jorge Figueroa Vázquez

9 April 2023 28	Almería	2–1	Valencia	Almería
18:30 CEST (UTC+2)	Chumi (yellow card) 20'; Suárez (yellow card) 23'; Robertone (yellow card) 42'; Melero 49'; Babić 58'	Report	Foulquier (yellow card) 7'; Castillejo 61'; Pérez (yellow card) 86'	Stadium: Power Horse Stadium; Attendance: 14,039; Referee: José María Sánchez Martínez

16 April 2023 29	Valencia	0–2	Sevilla	Valencia
21:00 CEST (UTC+2)	Moriba (red card) 84'; Duro (yellow card) 85'	Report	Ocampos (yellow card) 41'; Jordán (yellow card) 51'; Badé 55'; Suso 75'; Montiel (yellow card) 81'; Gudelj (yellow card) 90+3'	Stadium: Mestalla; Attendance: 39,654; Referee: Carlos del Cerro Grande

23 April 2023 30	Elche	0–2	Valencia	Elche
14:00 CEST (UTC+2)	Donald (yellow card) 47'; Roco (yellow card) 62'; Clerc (yellow card) 84'	Report	Musah (yellow card) 14'; Lino 19'; Verdú 42' (o.g.)	Stadium: Martínez Valero; Attendance: 22,129; Referee: Guillermo Cuadra Fernández

27 April 2023 31	Valencia	2–1	Valladolid	Valencia
19:30 CEST (UTC+2)	Diakhaby 60'; Guerra 90+3'	Report	Larin 6'; Kike (yellow card) 55'; Masip (yellow card) 57'; Hongla (yellow card) 66'; Joaquín (yellow card) 71'	Stadium: Mestalla; Attendance: 42,023; Referee: José Luis Munuera Montero

30 April 2023 32	Cádiz	2–1	Valencia	Cádiz
14:00 CEST (UTC+2)	Escalante 39'; Guardiola 46'; San Emeterio (yellow card) 60'; Sobrino (yellow card) 85'; Lozano (yellow card) 89'; Hernández (yellow card) 90+1'; Ledesma (yellow card) 90+2'; Espino (yellow card) 90+6'	Report	Lino 51'; Castillejo (yellow card) 75'; Moriba (yellow card) 85'	Stadium: Nuevo Mirandilla; Attendance: 18,650; Referee: Ricardo de Burgos Bengoetxea

3 May 2023 33	Valencia	1–1	Villarreal	Valencia
19:30 CEST (UTC+2)	González (yellow card) 27'; Lino (yellow card) 27', (goal) 72'; Correia (yellow card) 39'; Cavani (yellow card) 45+1'	Report	Jackson (yellow card) 41', (goal) 62'; Parejo (yellow card) 56'	Stadium: Mestalla; Attendance: 43,634; Referee: Jesús Gil Manzano

14 May 2023 34	Celta Vigo	1–2	Valencia	Vigo
14:00 CEST (UTC+2)	De la Torre (yellow card) 27'; Veiga (yellow card) 41'; Seferovic 60'; Tapia (yellow card) 86'	Report	Kluivert 8'; Diakhaby (yellow card) 19'; Moriba (yellow card) 72'; Gabriel (yellow card) 74' (yellow-red card) 90+3'; Marí 88'; Almeida (yellow card) 90'	Stadium: Abanca-Balaídos; Attendance: 14,517; Referee: César Soto Grado

21 May 2023 35	Valencia	1–0	Real Madrid	Valencia
18:30 CEST (UTC+2)	López 33'; Kluivert (yellow card) 57'; Cömert (yellow card) 70'; Musah (yellow card) 90+4'; Mamardashvili (yellow card) 90+5'	Report	Rodrygo (yellow card) 86'; Modrić (yellow card) 87'; Vinícius (red card) 90+7'	Stadium: Mestalla; Attendance: 46,002; Referee: Ricardo de Burgos Bengoetxea

25 May 2023 36	Mallorca	1–0	Valencia	Palma
19:30 CEST (UTC+2)	Kadewere (yellow card) 8'; Lee (yellow card) 12'; Rodríguez (yellow card) 39'; Muriqi 64'; Sánchez (yellow card) 90+5'	Report	Cavani (yellow card) 83'; Marí (yellow card) 90+3'	Stadium: Visit Mallorca Stadium; Attendance: 14,631; Referee: Alejandro Hernández Hernández

28 May 2023 37	Valencia	2–2	Espanyol	Valencia
19:00 CEST (UTC+2)	López 38'; Lino 90+3'	Report	Montes (yellow card) 12', (goal) 40'; Gil (yellow card) 37'; Braithwaite 50'; Vidal (yellow card) 90'	Stadium: Mestalla; Attendance: 44,141; Referee: Jesús Gil Manzano

4 June 2023 38	Real Betis	1–1	Valencia	Seville
21:00 CEST (UTC+2)	Pérez 1'; Cruz (yellow card) 90+6'; Iglesias (yellow card) 90+10'; Guardado (yellow card) 90+12'	Report	López 71'; Musah (red card) 81'	Stadium: Benito Villamarín; Attendance: 54,087; Referee: Javier Alberola Rojas

=== Copa del Rey ===
3 January 2023 Round of 32	La Nucía	0–3	Valencia	La Nucía
19:00 CET (UTC+1)	Martín (yellow card) 60'; J. García (yellow card) 63'	Report	Kluivert 3'; Moriba 31'; Duro 72'; Iranzo (yellow card) 87'	Stadium: Camilo Cano; Attendance: 7,000; Referee: Mario Melero López

18 January 2023 Round of 16	Sporting Gijón	0–4	Valencia	Gijón
CET (UTC+1)		Report	Cavani 10', 39'; Kluivert 21'; Lino 64'	Stadium: El Molinón; Attendance: 14,625; Referee: José Luis Munuera Montero

26 January 2023 Quarter-finals	Valencia	1–3	Athletic Bilbao	Valencia
20:00 CET (UTC+1)	Diakhaby (yellow card) 28'; De Marcos 43' (o.g.); Musah (yellow card) 45+2'; Cömert (yellow card) 74'; Moriba (yellow card) 90+7'	Report	Vivian (yellow card) 32'; Muniain 35'; N. Williams 45'; Vesga 74' (pen.); Agirrezabala (yellow card) 78'; Sancet (yellow card) 88'	Stadium: Mestalla; Attendance: 45,040; Referee: Carlos del Cerro Grande

=== Supercopa de España ===
11 January 2023 Semi-finals	Real Madrid	1–1 (a.e.t.) (4–3 p)	Valencia	Riyadh, Saudi Arabia
21:00 (UTC+3)	Camavinga (yellow card) 28'; Benzema 39' (pen.); Nacho (yellow card) 109'	Report	Kluivert (yellow card) 31'; Cömert (yellow card) 38'; Lino 46'; Cavani (yellow card) 92'; Almeida (yellow card) 100'	Stadium: King Fahd International Stadium; Attendance: 50,492; Referee: Alejandro Hernández Hernández
	Penalties
	Benzema (penalty scored); Modrić (penalty scored); Kroos (penalty scored); Asensio (penalty scored)		(penalty scored) Cavani; (penalty missed) Cömert; (penalty scored) Moriba; (penalty scored) Guillamón; (penalty missed) Gayà

== Team statistics ==
=== Appearances and goals ===
As of 4 Jun 2023

No.	Pos.	Player	La Liga		Copa del Rey		Supercopa		Total	
No.	Pos.	Player	Apps	Goals	Apps	Goals	Apps	Goals	Apps	Goals
1	GK	(Spain) Iago Herrerín	0	0	0+1	0	0	0	1	0
2	DF	(Portugal) Thierry Correia	24+3	0	0	0	1	0	28	0
3	DF	(Spain) Toni Lato	9+15	1	2	0	1	0	27	1
4	MF	(United States) Yunus Musah	26+7	0	2+1	0	1	0	37	0
5	DF	(Brazil) Gabriel Paulista	19+3	1	2	0	0	0	24	1
6	DF	(Spain) Hugo Guillamón	19+6	1	2+1	0	0+1	0	29	1
7	FW	(Uruguay) Edinson Cavani	18+5	5	2	2	1	0	26	7
8	MF	(Mali) Ilaix Moriba	9+14	0	2+1	1	0+1	0	27	1
9	MF	(Netherlands) Justin Kluivert	16+10	7	2	2	1	0	29	9
11	MF	(Spain) Samu Castillejo	16+9	3	1	0	0	0	26	3
12	DF	(Guinea) (France) Mouctar Diakhaby	27+1	3	0+1	0	0	0	29	3
14	DF	(Spain) José Gayà	31	1	1+1	0	1	0	34	1
15	DF	(Turkey) Cenk Özkacar	14+4	0	2+1	0	1	0	22	0
16	MF	(Brazil) Samuel Lino	33+5	7	2	1	1	0	41	8
17	MF	(Spain) Nico	18+9	1	0	0	0	0	27	1
18	MF	(Portugal) André Almeida	30+4	2	1+2	0	1	0	38	2
19	FW	(Spain) Hugo Duro	12+18	1	1+2	1	0+1	0	34	2
20	DF	(Guadeloupe) (France) Dimitri Foulquier	17+12	0	2	0	0+1	0	32	0
21	DF	(Spain) Jesús Vázquez	3+7	0	1+1	0	0	0	12	0
22	FW	(Brazil) Marcos André	4+14	1	1+1	0	0	0	20	1
24	DF	(Switzerland) Eray Cömert	19+4	1	1	0	1	0	25	1
25	GK	(Georgia (country)) Giorgi Mamardashvili	38	0	3	0	1	0	42	0
29	MF	(Spain) Fran Pérez	0+7	0	0+3	0	0+1	0	11	0
33	DF	(Spain) Cristhian Mosquera	1+2	0	1	0	0	0	4	0
34	DF	(Spain) Rubén Iranzo	0	0	0+1	0	0	0	1	0
36	MF	(Spain) Javier Guerra Moreno	6+4	1	0	0	0	0	10	1
40	FW	(Spain) Diego López	5+5	3	0	0	0	0	10	3
46	FW	(Spain) Alberto Mari	0+5	1	0	0	0	0	5	1
Players who have played this season but had left the club
9	FW	(Uruguay) Maxi Gómez	0+3	0	0	0	0	0	3	0
10	MF	(Spain) Carlos Soler	3	1	0	0	0	0	3	1
21	FW	(Spain) Manu Vallejo	0	0	0	0	0	0	0	0
Players who are loan to other club
8	MF	(Serbia) Uroš Račić	0+1	0	0	0	0	0	1	0
18	MF	(New Caledonia) Koba Koindredi	0	0	0	0	0	0	0	0
?	GK	(Spain) Jaume Doménech	0	0	0	0	0	0	0	0

=== Disciplinary record ===
As of 4 June 2023

No.	Pos.	Player	La Liga			Copa del Rey			Supercopa			Total		
No.	Pos.	Player	Yellow card	Second yellow card	Red card	Yellow card	Second yellow card	Red card	Yellow card	Second yellow card	Red card	Yellow card	Second yellow card	Red card
2	DF	(Portugal) Thierry Correia	6	0	0	0	0	0	0	0	0	0	0	0
3	DF	(Spain) Toni Lato	1	0	1	0	0	0	0	0	0	0	0	0
4	MF	(United States) Yunus Musah	9	0	1	1	0	0	0	0	0	0	0	0
5	DF	(Brazil) Gabriel Paulista	2	1	1	0	0	0	0	0	0	0	0	0
6	MF	(Spain) Hugo Guillamón	5	0	0	0	0	0	0	0	0	0	0	0
7	FW	(Uruguay) Edinson Cavani	5	0	0	0	0	0	1	0	0	0	0	0
8	MF	(Mali) Ilaix Moriba	5	1	1	1	0	0	0	0	0	0	0	0
9	FW	(Netherlands) Justin Kluivert	2	0	0	0	0	0	1	0	0	0	0	0
11	FW	(Spain) Samu Castillejo	7	0	0	0	0	0	0	0	0	0	0	0
12	DF	(France) Mouctar Diakhaby	5	1	0	0	0	0	0	0	0	0	0	0
14	DF	(Spain) José Gayà	4	0	0	0	0	0	0	0	0	0	0	0
15	DF	(Turkey) Cenk Özkacar	1	0	0	0	0	0	0	0	0	0	0	0
16	MF	(Brazil) Samuel Lino	5	0	0	0	0	0	0	0	0	0	0	0
17	MF	(Spain) Nico González	1	0	0	0	0	0	0	0	0	0	0	0
18	MF	(Portugal) André Almeida	3	0	0	0	0	0	1	0	0	0	0	0
19	FW	(Spain) Hugo Duro	4	0	0	0	0	0	0	0	0	0	0	0
20	DF	(Spain) Dimitri Foulquier	5	0	0	1	0	0	0	0	0	0	0	0
21	DF	(Spain) Jesús Vázquez Alcalde	1	0	0	0	0	0	0	0	0	0	0	0
22	FW	(Brazil) Marcos André	1	0	1	0	0	0	0	0	0	0	0	0
24	DF	(Switzerland) Eray Cömert	5	0	1	1	0	0	1	0	0	0	0	0
25	GK	(Georgia (country)) Giorgi Mamardashvili	3	0	0	0	0	0	0	0	0	0	0	0
29	MF	(Spain) Fran Pérez	2	0	0	0	0	0	0	0	0	0	0	0
34	DF	(Spain) Rubén Iranzo	0	0	0	1	0	0	0	0	0	0	0	0
46	FW	(Spain) Alberto Mari	1	0	0	0	0	0	0	0	0	0	0	0
