= Martín Tejón =

Spanish footballer (born 2004)

Personal information
- Full name: Martín Tejón Fauli
- Date of birth: 12 April 2004 (age 22)
- Place of birth: Vilamarxant, Spain
- Height: 1.65 m (5 ft 5 in)
- Position: Attacking midfielder

Team information
- Current team: Marítimo
- Number: 10

Youth career
- Vilamarxant
- 2011–2022: Valencia

Senior career*
Years	Team	Apps	(Gls)
2021–2025	Valencia B	83	(8)
2024–2025	Valencia	4	(0)
2025–	Marítimo	32	(5)
- * Club domestic league appearances and goals as of 19 June 2026

Martín Tejón Fauli (born 12 April 2004) is a Spanish footballer who plays as an attacking midfielder for Primeira Liga club Marítimo.

== Career ==
Born in Vilamarxant, Valencian Community, Tejón joined Valencia CF's youth setup at the age of seven, from hometown side Vilamarxant CF. He made his senior debut with the reserves on 28 November 2021, coming on as a second-half substitute for Noha Ndombasi in a 2–0 Tercera División RFEF home win over Athletic Club Torrellano.

Tejón scored his first senior goal on 5 February 2023, netting the B's winner in a 2–1 Segunda Federación away win over Lleida Esportiu. On 10 August, after spending the pre-season with the main squad, he renewed his contract until 2026.

Tejón made his first team – and La Liga – debut on 17 August 2024, replacing fellow youth graduate Jesús Vázquez late into a 2–1 home loss to FC Barcelona.

On 15 July 2025, Tejón moved abroad and signed with Marítimo in Portugal.

== Career statistics ==
As of match played 17 August 2024

Appearances and goals by club, season and competition
Club	Season	League			Copa del Rey		Other		Total	
Club	Season	Division	Apps	Goals	Apps	Goals	Apps	Goals	Apps	Goals
Valencia B	2021–22	Tercera División RFEF	10	0	—		—		10	0
Valencia B	2022–23	Segunda Federación	16	3	—		2 (Note: Appearances in 2023 Segunda Federación play-offs)	0	15	3
Valencia B	2023–24	Segunda Federación	32	2	—		—		32	2
Valencia B	Total		56	5	—		2	0	58	5
Valencia	2024–25	La Liga	1	0	0	0	—		1	0
Career total			57	5	0	0	2	0	59	5
