= David Otorbi =

Spanish footballer (born 2007)

Personal information
- Full name: David Otorbi Ejededawe
- Date of birth: 16 October 2007 (age 19)
- Place of birth: Valencia, Spain
- Height: 1.80 m (5 ft 11 in)
- Position: Winger

Team information
- Current team: Valencia
- Number: 27

Youth career
- Atlético Cabanyal
- Malvarrosa
- 2019–2023: Valencia

Senior career*
Years	Team	Apps	(Gls)
2023–	Valencia B	51	(3)
2024–	Valencia	8	(1)

International career^{‡}
2022	Spain U15	2	(1)
2022–2023	Spain U16	10	(0)
2023–2024	Spain U17	11	(0)
2024–	Spain U18	3	(0)
- * Club domestic league appearances and goals as of 11 October 2026 ‡ National team caps and goals as of 03:32, 16 October 2024 (UTC)

David Otorbi Ejededawe (born 16 October 2007) is a Spanish professional footballer who plays as a winger for La Liga club Valencia.

A product of Valencia's youth academy, Otorbi became the club's youngest-ever debutant in January 2024, aged 16 years, two months and 19 days, and later its youngest player to appear in La Liga, aged 16 years and 306 days.

== Early life ==
Otorbi was born in El Cabanyal, a seaside neighbourhood of Valencia, to Nigerian parents. He began playing at the age of six with local side Atlético Cabanyal CF, where he was nicknamed La Pantera del Cabanyal ("the Cabanyal Panther"), before moving to CF Malvarrosa.

== Club career ==
=== Valencia ===
Otorbi joined Valencia CF's youth setup in 2019. On 16 October 2023, his 16th birthday, he signed a contract with the club until 2026.

Otorbi made his senior debut with the reserves on 5 November 2023, coming on as a second-half substitute in a 1–1 Segunda Federación away draw against RCD Espanyol B. He made his first team debut the following 7 January, wearing the number 47 and replacing fellow youth graduate Diego López in the 80th minute of a 2–1 extra-time away win over FC Cartagena in the season's Copa del Rey; aged 16 years, two months and 19 days, he became the youngest-ever debutant of the club, overcoming Diego Ribera.

Otorbi made his La Liga debut on 17 August 2024, on the opening day of the 2024–25 season, replacing fellow youth graduate Rafa Mir late into a 2–1 home loss to FC Barcelona; aged 16 years and 306 days, he became the youngest player to appear for Valencia in the league.

On 11 October 2026, in the eighth round of the 2026–27 season, Otorbi scored his first La Liga goal in an away match against Racing de Santander at El Sardinero: after Racing had overturned Dani Raba's early opener, he converted a pass from Javi Guerra inside the box in the 66th minute to level the score at 2–2.

== International career ==
From a Nigerian family settled in Valencia, Otorbi is eligible to represent either Nigeria or Spain. He has represented the latter at under-15, under-16 and under-17 levels.

== Career statistics ==
As of match played 17 August 2024

Appearances and goals by club, season and competition
Club	Season	League			Copa del Rey		Other		Total	
Club	Season	Division	Apps	Goals	Apps	Goals	Apps	Goals	Apps	Goals
Valencia B	2023–24	Segunda Federación	6	0	—		—		6	0
Valencia	2023–24	La Liga	0	0	2	0	0	0	2	0
Valencia	2024–25	La Liga	1	0	0	0	0	0	1	0
Valencia	Total		1	0	2	0	0	0	3	0
Career total			7	0	2	0	0	0	9	0
