= Aaron Mayol =

Spanish footballer (born 2008)

Personal information
- Full name: Aaron Ndive Mayol de la Cueva
- Date of birth: 3 March 2008 (age 18)
- Place of birth: Valencia, Spain
- Height: 1.79 m (5 ft 10 in)
- Position: Midfielder

Team information
- Current team: Valencia B
- Number: 30

Youth career
- 2014–2015: SF Júcar
- 2015–2016: Patacona
- 2016–2022: Levante
- 2022–2023: Patacona
- 2023–2025: Levante
- 2025–2026: Valencia

Senior career*
Years	Team	Apps	(Gls)
2026–	Valencia B	8	(0)
2026–	Valencia	1	(0)
- * Club domestic league appearances and goals as of 15 September 2026

Aaron Ndive Mayol de la Cueva (born 3 March 2008) is a Spanish professional footballer who plays as a midfielder for Valencia CF Mestalla.

== Career ==
Born in Valencia, Mayol impressed during his ten-year spell at Levante UD, but did not agree to new terms in 2025. In May of that year, he signed a two-year deal with Valencia CF, being initially a member of the Juvenil squad.

Mayol made his senior debut with the reserves on 22 February 2026, coming on as a second-half substitute in a 1–1 Segunda Federación away draw against Reus FC Reddis. On 7 May, he renewed his contract until 2029.

Mayol made his professional – and La Liga – debut on 15 September 2026, starting in a 1–0 away win over Deportivo Alavés, and became the first player born in 2008 to play for Valencia.
