= José Gayà =

Spanish footballer (born 1995)

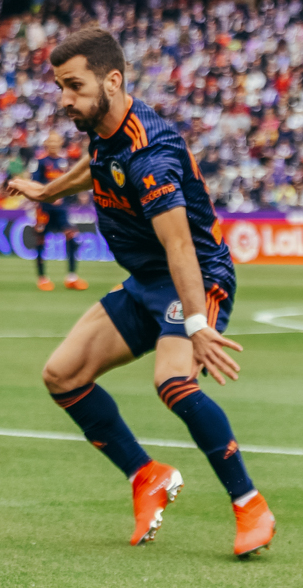
- Gayà with Valencia in 2019

Personal information
- Full name: José Luis Gayà Peña
- Date of birth: 25 May 1995 (age 31)
- Place of birth: Pedreguer, Spain
- Height: 1.72 m (5 ft 8 in)
- Position: Left-back

Team information
- Current team: Valencia
- Number: 14

Youth career
- 2006–2012: Valencia

Senior career*
| Years | Team | Apps | (Gls) |
| 2012–2014 | Valencia B | 63 | (3) |
| 2012– | Valencia | 353 | (9) |

International career
| 2012 | Spain U17 | 2 | (1) |
| 2013 | Spain U18 | 2 | (0) |
| 2013–2014 | Spain U19 | 11 | (1) |
| 2013 | Spain U20 | 4 | (0) |
| 2014–2017 | Spain U21 | 15 | (1) |
| 2018–2023 | Spain | 22 | (3) |
Medal record
Men's football
Representing Spain
UEFA European Championship
| Bronze medal – third place | 2020 Europe |
UEFA European Under-21 Championship
| Runner-up | 2017 Poland | Team |
- * Club domestic league appearances and goals as of 15:21, 9 November 2026 (UTC)

José Luis Gayà Peña (Valencian: [xoˈse luˈiz ɣaˈja ˈpeɲa]; born 25 May 1995) is a Spanish professional footballer who plays as a left-back for La Liga club Valencia, which he captains.

An academy graduate of Valencia, he made his senior debut in 2012 and went on to play more than 400 competitive matches for the club, winning the Copa del Rey in 2019.

Gayà appeared in his first full match with the Spain national team in 2018, being selected for Euro 2020.

== Club career ==
Born in Pedreguer, Alicante, Valencian Community, Gayà was a product of Valencia's youth system, where he started playing as a striker – scoring over 60 goals in one year – before switching to left-back. He made his senior debut with the reserves when he was not even 17, playing 21 minutes in a 1–0 away win against Andorra in the Segunda División B in what would be his only appearance of the season.

On 30 October 2012, Gayà appeared in his first official game with the main squad, playing the full 90 minutes in a 2–0 away victory over Llagostera in the round of 32 of the Copa del Rey. He made his first appearance in the UEFA Europa League on 12 December of the following year, in a 1–1 group stage home draw with Kuban Krasnodar.

Gayà played his first game in La Liga with the Che on 27 April 2014, starting and finishing the 0–1 home loss against eventual champions Atlético Madrid. On 3 August, he scored the first goal of a 3–1 defeat of Benfica in that year's Emirates Cup.

Gayà was made a starter by new manager Nuno Espírito Santo in the 2014–15 campaign. He scored his first goal as a professional and in the Spanish top flight on 25 September 2014, grabbing his team's second in the 3–0 home victory against Córdoba. His second came in the domestic cup on 7 January of the following year, helping to a 2–1 win over Espanyol also at the Mestalla Stadium. On 8 May 2015, he renewed his contract with the club, signing until 2020 with a €50 million buyout clause.

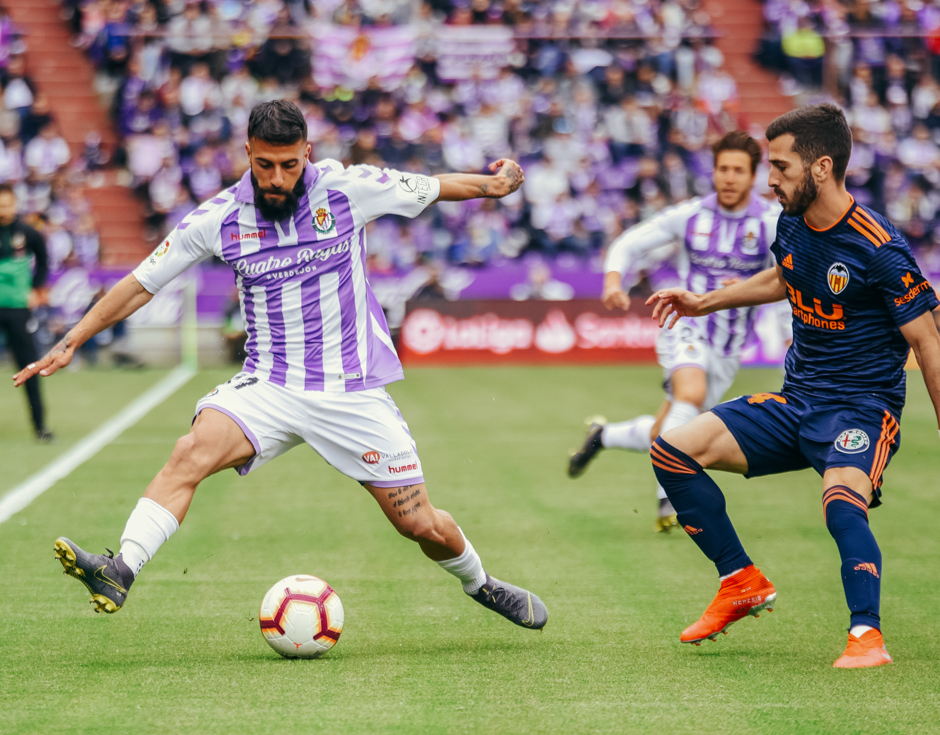
Gayà (in blue) playing against Valladolid in May 2019

In May 2018, Gayà agreed to a further extension until 2023 with his release clause increasing to €100 million. That October, having been part of the side that kept a clean sheet against Manchester United in the group stage of the UEFA Champions League, ESPN FC put him into their Champions League Best XI. He finished the season with his first honour, assisting Kevin Gameiro's opener in a 2–1 defeat of Barcelona in the 2019 Copa del Rey final.

In March 2020, Gayà and teammates Ezequiel Garay and Eliaquim Mangala tested positive for COVID-19 virus during the coronavirus pandemic in Spain. That August, due to the economic effects of the pandemic, the entire squad was put up for sale except him. Having previously filled in as captain in the absence of Dani Parejo, he took the role permanently as the midfielder was shipped to Villarreal.

Gayà skippered Valencia in the 2022 Copa del Rey final, in which he scored in the penalty shootout that the team lost to Real Betis. He was suspended for the first four matches of the following league season for criticising the referee's decisions in a game against Osasuna; his appeal was rejected at the Court of Arbitration for Sport. On 19 October that year, he extended his contract to last until 2027.

On 14 March 2026, Gayà made his 400th appearance for the club in a 1–0 away defeat against Real Oviedo, becoming the seventh player in its history to reach this milestone.

== International career ==
Gayà earned 34 caps for Spain across all youth levels. On 26 May 2015, he was called to the full side for a friendly with Costa Rica and a UEFA Euro 2016 qualifying match against Belarus, but did not make his debut on either occasion.

Gayà played his first match on 11 September 2018, featuring the entire 6–0 home rout of Croatia in the UEFA Nations League. On 3 September 2020, in the same competition, he scored the equalising goal in the 97th minute of a 1–1 away draw against Germany.

On 24 May 2021, Gayà was included in Luis Enrique's 24-man squad for Euro 2020. His input for the semi-finalists consisted of 77 minutes in the 5–3 extra time victory over Croatia in Copenhagen.

Gayà was called up for the 2022 FIFA World Cup in Qatar. In the pre-tournament training camp in Jordan, he suffered a right ankle sprain, and was replaced by Alejandro Balde.

== Career statistics ==
=== Club ===
As of match played 10 November 2026

Appearances and goals by club, season and competition
| Club | Season | League | | | Copa del Rey | | Europe | | Other | | Total | |
| Club | Season | Division | Apps | Goals | Apps | Goals | Apps | Goals | Apps | Goals | Apps | Goals |
|---|---|---|---|---|---|---|---|---|---|---|---|---|
| Valencia B | 2011–12 | Segunda División B | 1 | 0 | — | | — | | — | | 1 | 0 |
| Valencia B | 2012–13 | Segunda División B | 36 | 2 | — | | — | | — | | 36 | 2 |
| Valencia B | 2013–14 | Segunda División B | 26 | 1 | — | | — | | 2 (Note: Appearances in Segunda División B relegation play-offs) | 0 | 28 | 1 |
| Valencia B | Total | | 63 | 3 | — | | — | | 2 | 0 | 65 | 3 |
| Valencia | 2012–13 | La Liga | 0 | 0 | 1 | 0 | — | | — | | 1 | 0 |
| Valencia | 2013–14 | La Liga | 1 | 0 | 0 | 0 | 3 (Note: Appearances in UEFA Europa League) | 0 | — | | 4 | 0 |
| Valencia | 2014–15 | La Liga | 35 | 1 | 2 | 1 | — | | — | | 37 | 2 |
| Valencia | 2015–16 | La Liga | 20 | 0 | 5 | 1 | 11 (Note: Seven appearances in UEFA Champions League, four appearances in UEFA Europa League) | 0 | — | | 36 | 1 |
| Valencia | 2016–17 | La Liga | 27 | 1 | 3 | 0 | — | | — | | 30 | 1 |
| Valencia | 2017–18 | La Liga | 34 | 0 | 4 | 0 | — | | — | | 38 | 0 |
| Valencia | 2018–19 | La Liga | 35 | 1 | 5 | 0 | 9 (Note: Five appearances in UEFA Champions League, four appearances in UEFA Europa League) | 0 | — | | 49 | 1 |
| Valencia | 2019–20 | La Liga | 24 | 0 | 1 | 0 | 6 (Note: Appearances in UEFA Champions League) | 0 | 1 (Note: Appearance in Supercopa de España) | 0 | 32 | 0 |
| Valencia | 2020–21 | La Liga | 33 | 1 | 1 | 0 | — | | — | | 34 | 1 |
| Valencia | 2021–22 | La Liga | 24 | 2 | 7 | 0 | — | | — | | 31 | 2 |
| Valencia | 2022–23 | La Liga | 31 | 1 | 2 | 0 | — | | 1 | 0 | 34 | 1 |
| Valencia | 2023–24 | La Liga | 24 | 1 | 3 | 1 | — | | — | | 27 | 2 |
| Valencia | 2024–25 | La Liga | 23 | 0 | 0 | 0 | — | | — | | 23 | 0 |
| Valencia | 2025–26 | La Liga | 32 | 1 | 0 | 0 | — | | — | | 32 | 1 |
| Valencia | 2026–27 | La Liga | 10 | 0 | 1 | 0 | — | | — | | 11 | 0 |
| Valencia | Total | | 353 | 9 | 35 | 3 | 29 | 0 | 2 | 0 | 419 | 12 |
| Career total | | | 416 | 12 | 35 | 3 | 29 | 0 | 4 | 0 | 484 | 15 |

=== International ===
Appearances and goals by national team and year
| National team | Year | Apps | Goals |
|---|---|---|---|
Spain
| Spain | 2018 | 3 | 0 |
| Spain | 2019 | 4 | 1 |
| Spain | 2020 | 5 | 1 |
| Spain | 2021 | 5 | 1 |
| Spain | 2022 | 1 | 0 |
| Spain | 2023 | 4 | 0 |
| Total | | 22 | 3 |

Spain score listed first, score column indicates score after each Gayà goal.

List of international goals scored by José Gayà
| No. | Date | Venue | Opponent | Score | Result | Competition |
|---|---|---|---|---|---|---|
| 1 | 7 June 2019 | Tórsvøllur, Tórshavn, Faroe Islands | Faroe Islands | 4–1 | 4–1 | UEFA Euro 2020 qualifying |
| 2 | 3 September 2020 | Mercedes-Benz Arena, Stuttgart, Germany | Germany | 1–1 | 1–1 | 2020–21 UEFA Nations League A |
| 3 | 5 September 2021 | Nuevo Vivero, Badajoz, Spain | Georgia | 1–0 | 4–0 | 2022 FIFA World Cup qualification |

== Honours ==
Valencia

- Copa del Rey: 2018–19

Spain U21

- UEFA European Under-21 Championship runner-up: 2017
