= André Almeida (footballer, born 2000) =

Portuguese footballer

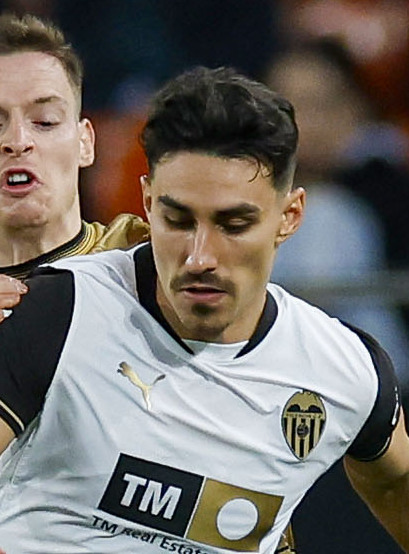
- Almeida with Valencia in 2025

Personal information
- Full name: Domingos André Ribeiro Almeida
- Date of birth: 30 May 2000 (age 26)
- Place of birth: Guimarães, Portugal
- Height: 1.72 m (5 ft 8 in)
- Position: Midfielder

Team information
- Current team: Racing Santander (on loan from Valencia)

Youth career
- 2009–2018: Vitória Guimarães

Senior career*
Years	Team	Apps	(Gls)
2016–2019	Vitória Guimarães B	23	(0)
2019–2022	Vitória Guimarães	72	(3)
2022–	Valencia	108	(4)
2026–	→ Racing Santander (loan)	0	(0)

International career
2015	Portugal U15	2	(0)
2015–2016	Portugal U16	10	(2)
2016–2017	Portugal U17	10	(0)
2018	Portugal U18	5	(0)
2018	Portugal U19	4	(0)
2019	Portugal U20	4	(0)
2021–2023	Portugal U21	15	(3)
- * Club domestic league appearances and goals as of 16:37, 3 June 2026 (UTC)

Domingos André Ribeiro Almeida (born 30 May 2000) is a Portuguese professional footballer who plays as a midfielder for La Liga club Racing de Santander, on loan from Valencia.

He began his career at Vitória de Guimarães, playing 89 total games before a €7.5 million transfer to Valencia in 2022.

== Club career ==
=== Vitória Guimarães ===
Born in Guimarães, Minho Province, Almeida joined the academy of Vitória de Guimarães before his 10th birthday. On 6 August 2016, at only 16, he made his senior debut with the reserve side in the LigaPro, playing 77 minutes in a 2–1 away loss against Santa Clara.

Almeida appeared in his first match in the Primeira Liga with the first team on 18 August 2019, starting in the 1–1 home draw with Boavista. He scored his first goal in the competition on 8 September, in the away fixture against Rio Ave (same result). The previous March, he had signed a professional contract until 2022 with a buyout clause of €20 million.

=== Valencia ===
On 25 August 2022, Almeida joined Valencia on a six-year deal; the transfer fee was the Spanish club's highest of the transfer window, €7.5 million in five instalments. He made his La Liga debut on 4 September in a 5–1 home win over Getafe as a 70th-minute substitute. Thirteen days later, he scored to conclude a 3–0 victory against Celta de Vigo also at the Mestalla Stadium.

On 1 September 2026, Almeida was loaned to Racing de Santander also in the Spanish top division, on a one-year deal.

== International career ==
Almeida earned his first cap for the Portugal under-21 team on 6 September 2021, starting a 1–0 home victory over Belarus in the 2023 UEFA European Championship qualifiers. The following month, also during that stage, he contributed one goal to the 11–0 demolition of Liechstenstein in Vizela.

Picked for the finals in Georgia and Romania, Almeida opened a 1–1 group-stage draw against the Netherlands in an eventual quarter-final exit.

== Career statistics ==
As of match played 23 May 2025

Appearances and goals by club, season and competition
Club	Season	League			National Cup (Note: Includes Taça de Portugal and Copa del Rey)		League Cup (Note: Includes Taça da Liga)		Continental		Other		Total	
Club	Season	Division	Apps	Goals	Apps	Goals	Apps	Goals	Apps	Goals	Apps	Goals	Apps	Goals
Vitória Guimarães B	2016–17	LigaPro	4	0	—								4	0
Vitória Guimarães B	2017–18	LigaPro	0	0	—								0	0
Vitória Guimarães B	2018–19	LigaPro	19	0	—								19	0
Vitória Guimarães B	Total		23	0	—								23	0
Vitória Guimarães	2019–20	Primeira Liga	8	1	0	0	2	0	4 (Note: Appearances in UEFA Europa League)	0	—		14	1
Vitória Guimarães	2020–21	Primeira Liga	30	2	2	0	1	0	—		—		33	2
Vitória Guimarães	2021–22	Primeira Liga	31	0	1	0	4	0	—		—		36	0
Vitória Guimarães	2022–23	Primeira Liga	3	0	0	0	0	0	3 (Note: Appearances in UEFA Europa Conference League)	0	—		6	0
Vitória Guimarães	Total		72	3	3	0	7	0	7	0	—		89	3
Valencia	2022–23	La Liga	34	2	3	0	—		—		1 (Note: Appearance in Supercopa de España)	0	38	2
Valencia	2023–24	La Liga	18	2	0	0	—		—		0	0	18	2
Valencia	2024–25	La Liga	34	0	4	0	—		—		0	0	38	0
Valencia	Total		86	4	7	0	0	0	0	0	1	0	94	4
Career Total			181	7	10	0	7	0	7	0	1	0	206	7
