= Ali Fadal =

Ghanaian footballer (born 2004)

Personal information
- Date of birth: 14 January 2004 (age 22)
- Place of birth: Kumasi, Ghana
- Height: 1.80 m (5 ft 11 in)
- Position: Midfielder

Team information
- Current team: Colorado Rapids
- Number: 15

Youth career
- Ghana Angel Soccer Academy
- –2022: Montverde Academy
- 2022–2023: Valencia

Senior career*
Years	Team	Apps	(Gls)
2023–2025	Valencia B	32	(0)
2023–2025	Valencia	0	(0)
2025–	Colorado Rapids	0	(0)
2025–	Colorado Rapids 2	0	(0)
- * Club domestic league appearances and goals as of 8 February 2025

Ali Fadal (born 14 January 2004) is a Ghanaian professional footballer who plays as a midfielder for Major League Soccer club Colorado Rapids.

== Early life ==
Fadal started playing football at the age of four. He joined the Montverde Academy in the United States at the age of fifteen.

== Club career ==
In 2022, Fadal signed for Spanish La Liga side Valencia. On 5 December 2023, he made his first team debut during a 1–0 Copa del Rey win over Arosa, becoming the first Ghanaian to play for the club. He has been regarded as one of the most promising prospects in Ghanaian football.

On 8 February 2025, Fadal joined Major League Soccer club Colorado Rapids on a two-year deal.

== Style of play ==
Fadal mainly operates as a midfielder. He is known for his strength and technical ability.

== Personal life ==
Fadal is the son of a footballer father.
