= Álex Serra =

Spanish footballer

Personal information
- Full name: Álex Serradell Garralaga
- Date of birth: 14 August 2002 (age 24)
- Place of birth: Sant Cugat del Vallès, Spain
- Height: 1.89 m (6 ft 2 in)
- Position: Centre-back

Team information
- Current team: Eldense
- Number: 5

Youth career
- Damm

Senior career*
Years	Team	Apps	(Gls)
2021–2022	Eibar Urko		
2022–2023	Vitoria	28	(1)
2023–2024	Navalcarnero	11	(0)
2024–2025	Valencia B	43	(0)
2025–	Eldense	33	(2)
- * Club domestic league appearances and goals as of 22 August 2026

Álex Serradell Garralaga (born 14 August 2002), known as Álex Serra, is a Spanish footballer who plays as a centre-back for CD Eldense.

== Club career ==
Born in Sant Cugat del Vallès, Barcelona, Catalonia, Serra played for CF Damm as a youth before joining the structure of SD Eibar in 2021. Initially a member of SD Eibar Urko in the regional leagues, he was promoted to the farm team CD Vitoria in July 2022.

In July 2023, Serra left Eibar and signed for Segunda Federación side CDA Navalcarnero. The following 24 January, he signed an 18-month contract with Valencia CF, being initially assigned to the reserves also in the fourth division.

On 27 July 2025, Serra agreed to a one-year deal with CD Eldense in the Primera Federación. On 22 June of the following year, after being a regular starter as the club achieved promotion to Segunda División, he renewed his contract for a further year.

Serra made his professional debut on 22 August 2026, starting in a 2–2 home draw against Cádiz CF.
