= Thierry Correia =

Portuguese footballer (born 1999)

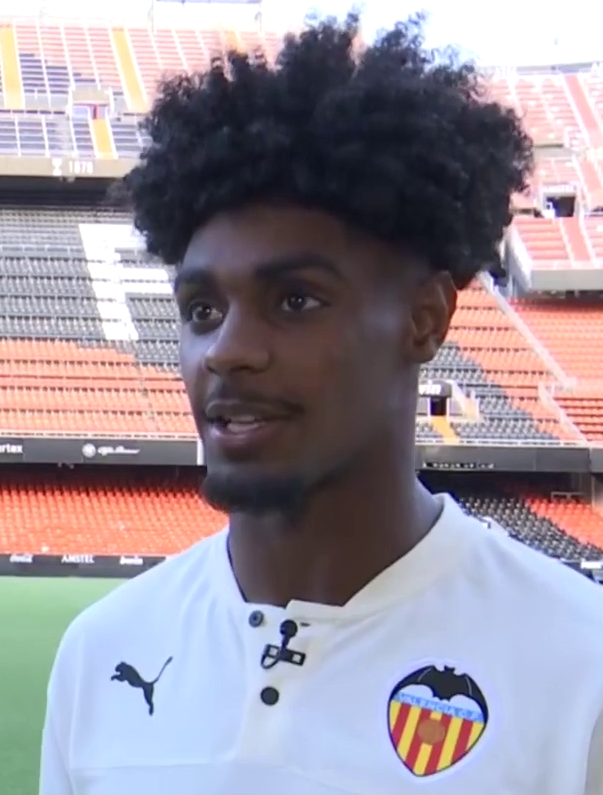
- Correia with Valencia in 2019

Personal information
- Full name: Thierry Rendall Correia
- Date of birth: 9 March 1999 (age 27)
- Place of birth: Amadora, Portugal
- Height: 1.76 m (5 ft 9 in)
- Position: Right-back

Team information
- Current team: Venezia
- Number: 14

Youth career
- 2007–2009: Damaiense
- 2009–2018: Sporting CP

Senior career*
Years	Team	Apps	(Gls)
2018–2019	Sporting CP	4	(0)
2019–2026	Valencia	145	(1)
2026–	Venezia	5	(0)

International career
2015	Portugal U16	5	(0)
2015–2016	Portugal U17	8	(0)
2017	Portugal U18	6	(0)
2017–2018	Portugal U19	16	(1)
2018–2019	Portugal U20	9	(0)
2019–2021	Portugal U21	10	(0)
Medal record
Men's football
Representing Portugal
UEFA European Under-21 Championship
Runner-up	2021 Hungary–Slovenia
UEFA European Under-19 Championship
Winner	2018 Finland
UEFA European Under-17 Championship
Winner	2016 Azerbaijan
- * Club domestic league appearances and goals as of 15:31, 17 October 2026 (UTC)

Thierry Rendall Correia (born 9 March 1999) is a Portuguese professional footballer who plays as a right-back for Serie A club Venezia.

== Club career ==
=== Sporting CP ===
Born in Amadora, Lisbon metropolitan area of Cape Verdean descent, Correia joined Sporting CP's academy at the age of 10. He spent the better part of his first year as a senior with their under-23 team.

Correia made his competitive debut for the main squad on 29 November 2018, coming on as a late substitute for Bruno Gaspar in a 6–1 away win against Qarabağ FK in the group stage of the UEFA Europa League. His first start was the following 4 August, in the 5–0 loss to S.L. Benfica in the Supertaça Cândido de Oliveira.

On 11 August 2019, Correia played his first match in the Primeira Liga, featuring the entire 1–1 draw at C.S. Marítimo.

=== Valencia ===
On 2 September 2019, Correia signed a five-year contract with Spanish club Valencia CF for a €12 million transfer fee. He made his La Liga debut later that month, playing the full 90 minutes in a 3–3 home draw against Getafe CF.

Correia scored his first goal as a senior on 7 January 2021, closing a 4–1 away victory over Yeclano Deportivo in the second round of the Copa del Rey. His first in the league came on 9 May, in the 3–0 home defeat of Real Valladolid.

Following the appointment of Rubén Baraja in February 2023, Correia became the undisputed first-choice. On 27 October 2024, however, he ruptured the anterior cruciate ligament of his left knee in a match against Getafe, being sidelined for the rest of the season.

Correia made 160 official appearances during his spell.

=== Venezia ===
On 2 July 2026, Correia agreed to a one-year deal at Serie A side Venezia.

== International career ==
Correia earned his first cap for the Portugal under-21 side on 5 September 2019, in a 4–0 victory over Gibraltar in the 2021 UEFA European Championship qualifiers.

== Career statistics ==
As of match played 27 October 2024

Appearances and goals by club, season and competition
Club	Season	League			National cup		League cup		Continental		Other		Total	
Club	Season	Division	Apps	Goals	Apps	Goals	Apps	Goals	Apps	Goals	Apps	Goals	Apps	Goals
Sporting CP	2018–19	Primeira Liga	0	0	0	0	0	0	2 (Note: Appearances in UEFA Europa League)	0	0	0	2	0
Sporting CP	2019–20	Primeira Liga	4	0	0	0	0	0	0	0	1 (Note: Appearance in Supertaça Cândido de Oliveira)	0	5	0
Sporting CP	Total		4	0	0	0	0	0	2	0	1	0	7	0
Valencia	2019–20	La Liga	4	0	2	0	—		1 (Note: Appearance in UEFA Champions League)	0	—		7	0
Valencia	2020–21	La Liga	29	1	3	1	—		—		—		32	2
Valencia	2021–22	La Liga	19	0	3	0	—		—		—		22	0
Valencia	2022–23	La Liga	27	0	0	0	—		—		1 (Note: Appearance in Supercopa de España)	0	28	0
Valencia	2023–24	La Liga	31	0	4	0	—		—		—		35	0
Valencia	2024–25	La Liga	11	0	0	0	—		—		—		11	0
Valencia	Total		121	1	12	1	0	0	1	0	1	0	135	2
Career total			125	1	12	1	0	0	3	0	2	0	142	2

== Honours ==
Portugal U17

- UEFA European Under-17 Championship: 2016

Portugal U19

- UEFA European Under-19 Championship: 2018
