= Javi Guerra (footballer, born 2003) =

Spanish footballer

Personal information
- Full name: Javier Guerra Moreno
- Date of birth: 13 May 2003 (age 23)
- Place of birth: Gilet, Spain
- Height: 1.88 m (6 ft 2 in)
- Position: Midfielder

Team information
- Current team: Valencia
- Number: 8

Youth career
- 2011–2019: Villarreal
- 2019–2021: Valencia

Senior career*
| Years | Team | Apps | (Gls) |
| 2021–2023 | Valencia B | 49 | (1) |
| 2023– | Valencia | 121 | (12) |

International career^{‡}
| 2021 | Spain U19 | 2 | (0) |
| 2023–2025 | Spain U21 | 21 | (2) |
| 2026– | Spain | 1 | (0) |
- * Club domestic league appearances and goals as of 22:00, 30 August 2026 ‡ National team caps and goals as of 21:36, 4 June 2026 (UTC)

Javier "Javi" Guerra Moreno (born 13 May 2003) is a Spanish professional footballer who plays as a midfielder for La Liga club Valencia and the Spain national team.

== Club career ==
Guerra was born in Gilet, Valencian Community, and joined Valencia's academy in 2019, from Villarreal. On 14 May 2021, he signed his first professional contract, with Valencia, until 2024.

Guerra made his senior debut with the reserves on 23 May 2021, coming on as a late substitute for Koba Koindredi in a 1–1 Segunda División B away draw against L'Hospitalet, as his side were already relegated. He made his first team debut the following 16 January, replacing fellow youth graduate Hugo Guillamón late into a 1–0 Copa del Rey win over Atlético Baleares.

Guerra made his professional – and La Liga – debut on 16 April 2023, replacing Samu Castillejo in a 2–0 home loss against Sevilla. Eleven days later, he scored a last-minute winner in a 2–1 home success over Real Valladolid, just minutes after coming on as a substitute.

In May 2023, Guerra further extended his link with the Che until 2027, and was definitely promoted to the main squad ahead of the 2023–24 season. He started the new campaign by scoring the winning goal in the 88th minute in a 2–1 win at Sevilla on 11 August, coming on as a substitute in the 66th minute.

In August 2025, Guerra extended his contract for four seasons, keeping him at the club until June 2029.

== International career ==
Guerra was called up to the Spain U19 squad in August 2021, making just two appearances with them.

Guerra received his first call-up to the Spain U21 in September 2023. He made his debut in a 2025 UEFA European Under-21 Championship qualification match against Malta. From that point on, he became a regular starter and a key player under manager Santi Denia.

In 2025, Guerra was included in the squad for the 2025 UEFA European Under-21 Championship. He served as the team's second captain and wore the captain’s armband during the match against hosts Slovakia, after first captain Beñat Turrientes was substituted early. Guerra played the full 90 minutes in Spain's second Group A match against Romania, where he was named Player of the Match. He scored his only goal of the tournament from the penalty spot in the quarter-final against England. Spain were eliminated following a 3–1 defeat.

Guerra received his first call up to the senior side in May 2026, as part of Spain's preparations for its successful 2026 FIFA World Cup campaign. He made his debut in June against Iraq at Estadio Riazor, though was not named in Spain's final World Cup squad.

== Playing style ==
Guerra is a versatile midfielder capable of playing in either a holding or more advanced role. He covers significant distances across the pitch, possesses strong short-passing ability, is effective at delivering through balls, and is noted for his tackling skills. He also known for his technical ability and long-range shooting, often posing a threat to goalkeepers from distance with powerful and accurate shots from both feet. He has scored several notable goals from outside the box, showcasing his shooting precision.

Miguel Ángel Angulo, Guerra's coach during his time with Valencia's reserve team, described his tactical versatility: "It depends on the game. If you're dominating possession at home, with the opponent sitting back, a technical number 'six' like him fits well. But in other, more physical matches, he can operate better as an 'eight'."

== Career statistics ==
As of match played 30 August 2026

Appearances and goals by club, season and competition
| Club | Season | League | | | Copa del Rey | | Total | |
| Club | Season | Division | Apps | Goals | Apps | Goals | Apps | Goals |
|---|---|---|---|---|---|---|---|---|
| Valencia B | 2020–21 | Segunda División B | 1 | 0 | — | | 1 | 0 |
| Valencia B | 2021–22 | Tercera División RFEF | 23 | 0 | — | | 23 | 0 |
| Valencia B | 2022–23 | Segunda Federación | 25 | 1 | — | | 25 | 1 |
| Valencia B | Total | | 49 | 1 | — | | 49 | 1 |
| Valencia | 2021–22 | La Liga | 0 | 0 | 1 | 0 | 1 | 0 |
| Valencia | 2022–23 | La Liga | 10 | 1 | 0 | 0 | 10 | 1 |
| Valencia | 2023–24 | La Liga | 36 | 4 | 4 | 0 | 40 | 4 |
| Valencia | 2024–25 | La Liga | 36 | 3 | 2 | 0 | 38 | 3 |
| Valencia | 2025–26 | La Liga | 36 | 4 | 4 | 0 | 40 | 4 |
| Valencia | 2026–27 | La Liga | 3 | 0 | 0 | 0 | 3 | 0 |
| Valencia | Total | | 121 | 12 | 11 | 0 | 132 | 12 |
| Career total | | | 170 | 13 | 11 | 0 | 181 | 13 |

=== International ===
As of match played 4 June 2026

Appearances and goals by national team and year
| National team | Year | Apps | Goals |
|---|---|---|---|
| Spain | 2026 | 1 | 0 |
| Total | | 1 | 0 |

== Honours ==
Individual

- 2022–23 Segunda Federación Group III: Best Player
- La Liga U23 Player of the Month: September 2023
