= Mouctar Diakhaby =

Guinean footballer (born 1996)

- Mouctar Diakhaby in the Guinean national team jersey 2024

Personal information
- Full name: Mouctar Diakhaby
- Date of birth: 19 December 1996 (age 29)
- Place of birth: Vendôme, France
- Height: 1.89 m (6 ft 2 in)
- Positions: Centre-back; defensive midfielder

Team information
- Current team: Valencia
- Number: 4

Youth career
- 2004–2009: USSA Vertou
- 2009–2010: Nantes
- 2010–2013: USSA Vertou
- 2013–2016: Lyon

Senior career*
Years	Team	Apps	(Gls)
2014–2018	Lyon B	55	(11)
2016–2018	Lyon	34	(2)
2018–	Valencia	162	(10)

International career^{‡}
2014–2015	France U19	11	(1)
2015–2016	France U20	6	(0)
2017–2018	France U21	9	(1)
2022–	Guinea	18	(1)
- * Club domestic league appearances and goals as of 24 July 2026 ‡ National team caps and goals as of 8 September 2025

Mouctar Diakhaby (born 19 December 1996) is a professional footballer who plays as a centre-back or defensive midfielder for La Liga club Valencia. Born in France, he plays for the Guinea national team.

== Early life ==
Diakhaby was born in Vendôme, France, to Guinean parents, who were from Touba.

== Club career ==
=== Lyon ===
Diakhaby made his first team debut for Lyon on 10 September 2016 in a Ligue 1 match against Bordeaux, playing the whole match in a 3–1 home loss. On 30 November 2016, he scored his first competitive goal for the Lyon first team in a 6–0 Ligue 1 away rout of Nantes. On 23 February 2017, Diakhaby scored a goal (in the 89th minute) in the 2016–17 Europa League round of 32 second-leg 7–1 home win over AZ Alkmaar to register his first career UEFA Europa League or UEFA Champions League goal. He also scored a goal in each of two legs of the 2016–17 Europa League round of 16 tie against Roma.

=== Valencia ===
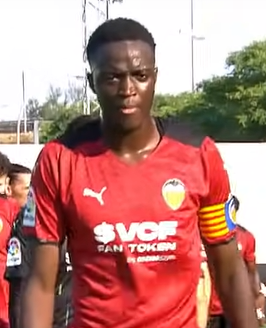
Diakhaby with Valencia in 2021

On 28 June 2018, Diakhaby signed a five-year deal with Spanish side Valencia. On 3 March 2024, he sustained a serious injury, diagnosed as a dislocated knee, following a collision with Aurélien Tchouaméni during a match against Real Madrid.

== International career ==
Diakhaby was born in France, but is Guinean by descent. He is a former youth international for France. In 2022 however he decided to represent the home country of his parents, Guinea, and debuted for them against Egypt.

On 23 December 2023, he was selected from the list of 25 Guinean players selected by Kaba Diawara to compete in the 2023 Africa Cup of Nations.

== Career statistics ==
=== Club ===
As of match played 23 September 2025

Appearances and goals by club, season and competition
Club	Season	League			National cup (Note: Includes Coupe de France, Copa del Rey)		League cup (Note: Includes Coupe de la Ligue)		Europe		Other		Total	
Club	Season	Division	Apps	Goals	Apps	Goals	Apps	Goals	Apps	Goals	Apps	Goals	Apps	Goals
Lyon	2016–17	Ligue 1	22	1	1	1	0	0	11 (Note: Two appearances in UEFA Champions League, eight appearances and three goals in UEFA Europa League)	3	0	0	34	5
Lyon	2017–18	Ligue 1	12	1	3	0	1	0	5 (Note: Appearances in UEFA Europa League)	1	—		21	2
Lyon	Total		34	2	4	1	1	0	16	4	0	0	55	7
Valencia	2018–19	La Liga	22	2	7	0	—		9 (Note: Three appearances in UEFA Champions League, six appearances and one goal in UEFA Europa League)	1	—		38	3
Valencia	2019–20	La Liga	21	0	3	0	—		5 (Note: Appearances in UEFA Champions League)	0	0	0	29	0
Valencia	2020–21	La Liga	26	1	1	0	—		—		—		27	1
Valencia	2021–22	La Liga	29	0	8	0	—		—		—		37	0
Valencia	2022–23	La Liga	29	3	1	0	—		—		0	0	30	3
Valencia	2023–24	La Liga	14	1	1	0	—		—		—		15	1
Valencia	2024–25	La Liga	13	2	1	0	—		—		—		14	2
Valencia	2025–26	La Liga	5	1	0	0	—		—		—		5	1
Valencia	Total		159	10	22	0	—		14	1	0	0	195	11
Career total			193	12	26	1	1	0	30	5	0	0	250	18

=== International ===
As of match played 8 September 2025

Appearances and goals by national team and year
National team	Year	Apps	Goals
Guinea	2022	4	1
Guinea	2023	5	0
Guinea	2024	5	0
Guinea	2025	4	0
Total		18	1

Scores and results list Guinea's goal tally first, score column indicates score after each Diakhaby goal.

List of international goals scored by Mouctar Diakhaby
No.	Date	Venue	Opponent	Score	Result	Competition
1	27 September 2022	Stade de la Licorne, Amiens, France	Ivory Coast	1–3	1–3	Friendly

== Honours ==
Valencia

- Copa del Rey: 2018–19
