= Jesús Vázquez (footballer, born 2003) =

Spanish footballer

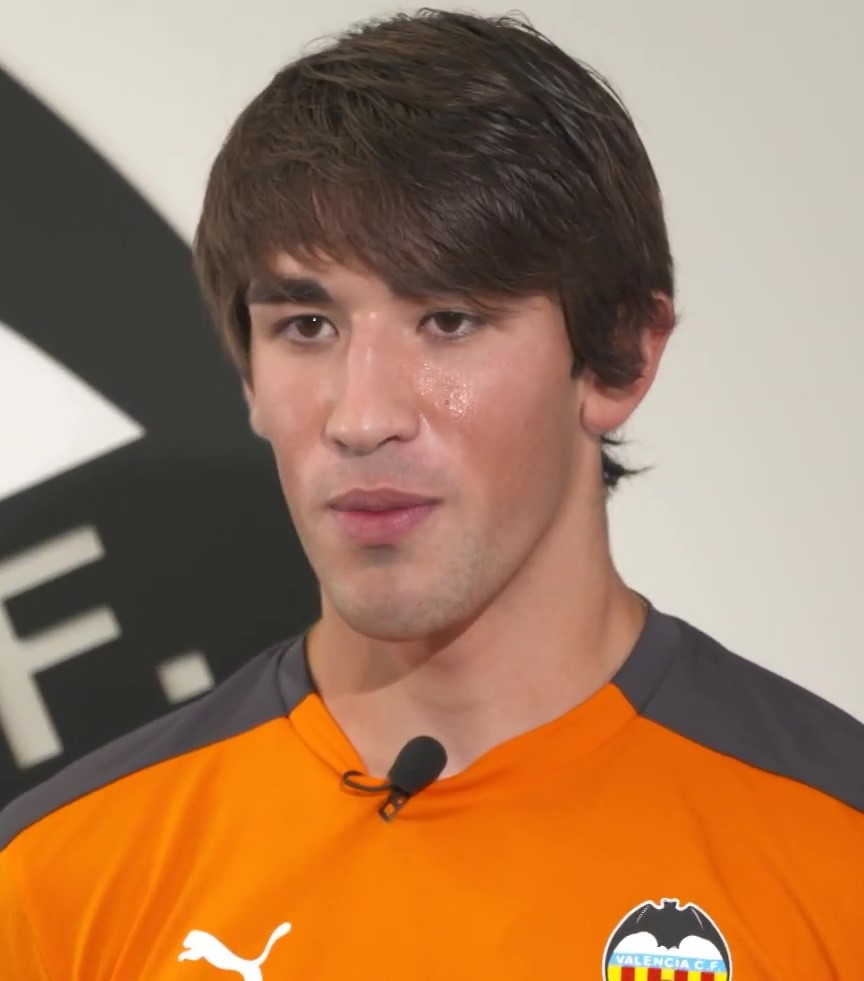
- Vázquez in 2021

Personal information
- Full name: Jesús Vázquez Alcalde
- Date of birth: 2 January 2003 (age 23)
- Place of birth: Mérida, Spain
- Height: 1.82 m (6 ft 0 in)
- Position: Left back

Team information
- Current team: Valencia
- Number: 21

Youth career
- 2008–2020: Valencia

Senior career*
Years	Team	Apps	(Gls)
2020–2021	Valencia B	23	(1)
2020–	Valencia	88	(1)

International career^{‡}
2019	Spain U16	4	(0)
2020	Spain U17	2	(0)
2019	Spain U18	2	(0)
2021–2022	Spain U19	8	(0)
- * Club domestic league appearances and goals as of 27 May 2026 ‡ National team caps and goals as of 29 March 2022

Jesús Vázquez Alcalde (born 2 January 2003) is a Spanish professional footballer who plays as a left back for La Liga club Valencia.

== Club career ==
Born in Mérida, Badajoz, Extremadura, Vázquez joined Valencia CF's youth setup at the age of five. He made his senior debut with the reserves on 1 November 2020, starting in a 0–0 Segunda División B home draw against Hércules CF.

Vázquez made his first team debut on 16 December 2020, starting in a 4–2 away win against Terrassa FC for the season's Copa del Rey. He scored his first senior goal the following 21 March, netting the B's only goal in a 1–2 loss at CD Alcoyano.

On 1 June 2021, Vázquez renewed his contract until 2025. He made his La Liga debut on 28 August, coming on as a late substitute for Denis Cheryshev in a 3–0 home win over Deportivo Alavés.

== Personal life ==
Vázquez's father Braulio was also a footballer. A forward, he played as a professional for Deportivo de La Coruña, S.C. Farense and CP Mérida.

== Career statistics ==
As of match played 17 August 2024

Appearances and goals by club, season and competition
Club	Season	League			National Cup		Europe		Other		Total	
Club	Season	Division	Apps	Goals	Apps	Goals	Apps	Goals	Apps	Goals	Apps	Goals
Valencia B	2020–21	Segunda División B	22	1	—		—		—		22	1
Valencia B	2021–22	Tercera División RFEF	1	0	—		—		—		1	0
Valencia B	Total		23	1	0	0	0	0	0	0	23	1
Valencia	2020–21	La Liga	0	0	1	0	—		—		1	0
Valencia	2021–22	La Liga	15	0	2	0	—		—		17	0
Valencia	2022–23	La Liga	10	0	2	0	—		0	0	12	0
Valencia	2023–24	La Liga	20	1	3	0	—		—		23	1
Valencia	2024–25	La Liga	1	0	0	0	—		—		1	0
Valencia	Total		46	1	8	0	0	0	0	0	54	1
Career total			69	2	8	0	0	0	0	0	77	2
