= Noha Ndombasi =

French footballer (born 2001)

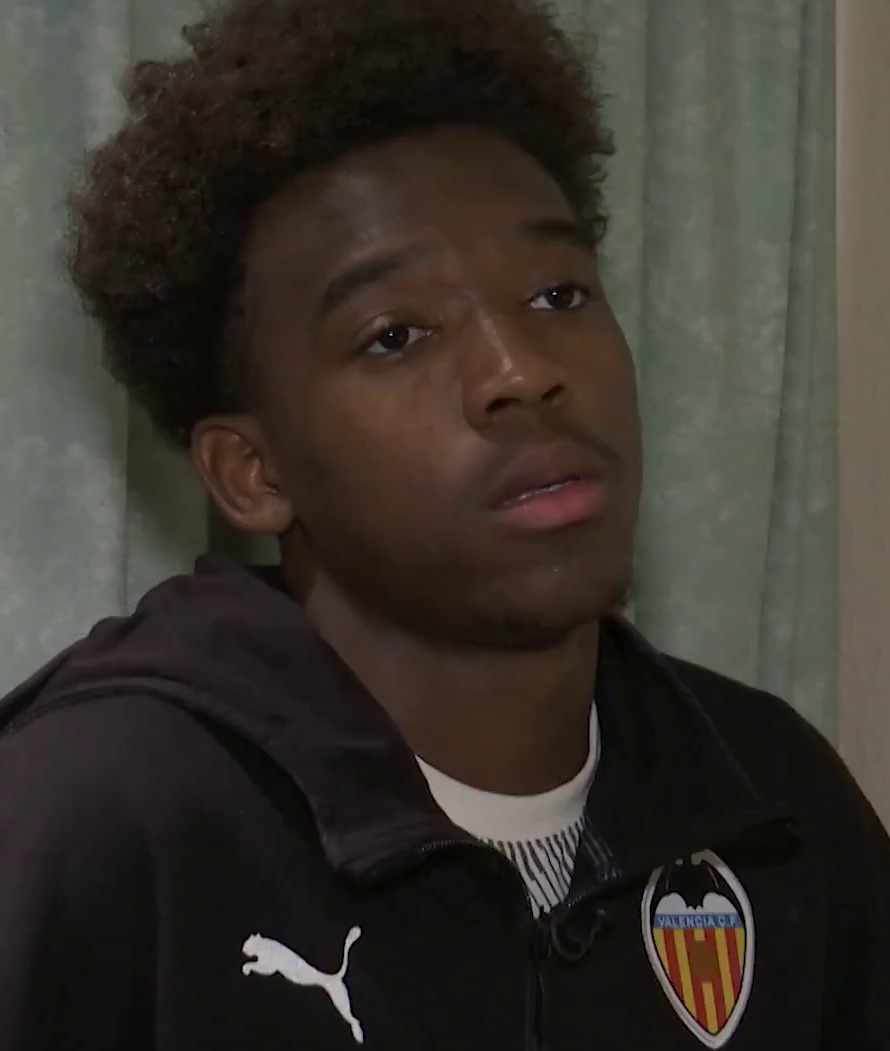

Personal information
- Full name: Noha Ndombasi Nlandu
- Date of birth: 28 April 2001 (age 25)
- Place of birth: Bondy, France
- Height: 1.74 m (5 ft 9 in)
- Position: Striker

Team information
- Current team: Caspiy
- Number: 11

Youth career
- –2019: Bordeaux

Senior career*
Years	Team	Apps	(Gls)
2019–2022	Valencia Mestalla	30	(4)
2022–2023	St. Gallen	11	(0)
2023–2024	Concarneau	26	(2)
2024–2026	Kryvbas Kryvyi Rih	13	(0)
2026–	Caspiy	28	(6)
- * Club domestic league appearances and goals as of 1 November 2026

Noha Ndombasi Nlandu (born 28 April 2001) is a French footballer who plays as a striker for Kazakhstan Premier League club Caspiy.

== Career ==
Ndombasi started his career with Spanish side Valencia Mestalla. It was said that he "took advantage of the unfortunate injuries of Alberto Marí and Hugo González... to gain confidence and minutes" while playing for the club. In 2023, he signed for French side Concarneau.

== Style of play ==
Ndombasi mainly operates as a striker. He has received comparisons to France international Franck Ribery.
