= César Tárrega =

Spanish footballer (born 2002)

Personal information
- Full name: César Tárrega Requeni
- Date of birth: 26 February 2002 (age 24)
- Place of birth: Aldaia, Spain
- Height: 1.94 m (6 ft 4 in)
- Position: Centre-back

Team information
- Current team: Valencia
- Number: 5

Youth career
- 2013–2016: Don Bosco
- 2016–2018: Levante
- 2017–2018: Patacona
- 2019–2021: Valencia

Senior career*
Years	Team	Apps	(Gls)
2021–2024	Valencia B	62	(3)
2021–	Valencia	67	(2)
2024	→ Valladolid (loan)	16	(1)

International career^{‡}
2025	Spain U21	7	(2)
- * Club domestic league appearances and goals as of 27 May 2026 ‡ National team caps and goals as of 14:24, 20 June 2025 (UTC)

César Tárrega Requeni (born 26 February 2002) is a Spanish professional footballer who plays as a centre-back for Valencia CF.

== Club career ==
Tárrega is a youth product of CD Don Bosco, Levante UD and Patacona CF, before finishing his youth training with Valencia CF who he joined in 2019. He was promoted to Valencia Mestalla for the 2021–22 season signing his first professional contract.

On 2 December 2021, Tárrega made his senior and professional debut with the senior Valencia team in a 3–0 Copa del Rey win over CD Utrillas. On 24 January 2023, he extended his contract with Valencia until 2027.

Tárrega started training with Valencia's senior team in the summer preseason ahead of the 2023–24 season, and made his La Liga debut as a late substitute with Valencia in a 3–0 win over Atlético de Madrid on 16 September 2023. On 19 January 2024, he was loaned to Segunda División side Real Valladolid for the remainder of the season.

Tárrega scored his first professional goal on 7 April 2024, netting his team's second in a 2–0 away win over FC Cartagena. After contributing with 16 appearances as the Pucelanos achieved promotion to the top tier, he returned to the Che and renewed his contract until 2028 on 27 June.

== International career ==
Tárrega has represented Spain at the under-21 level. He received his first call-up for two friendly matches against Czech Republic and Germany.

In May 2025, he was included in the squad for the 2025 UEFA European Under-21 Championship in Slovakia. He played as a starter in the Group A match against host Slovakia, scored the winning goal of the match in the 90th minute and was named Player of the Match.

== Playing style ==
Standing at 1.94m, Tárrega is a tall and physically imposing centre-back who is strong and forceful in the aerial game. Despite his height, he has good ball control skills and can pass well.

== Personal life ==
Tárrega studies physical education at the Valencia Catholic University Saint Vincent Martyr, and speaks English and French thanks to his mother who is a schoolteacher. His great-grandfather, Vicent Olaso, founded a club called Antonio Puchades in Valencia in the 1950s.
