= Diego López (footballer, born May 2002) =

Spanish footballer

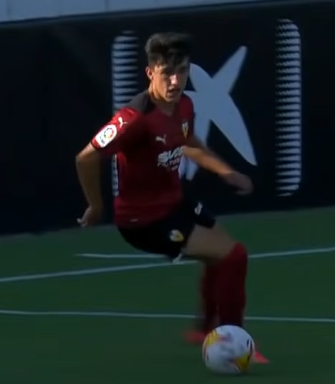
- López with Valencia in 2021

Personal information
- Full name: Diego López Noguerol
- Date of birth: 13 May 2002 (age 24)
- Place of birth: Turón, Spain
- Height: 1.72 m (5 ft 8 in)
- Positions: Winger; forward

Team information
- Current team: Valencia
- Number: 16

Youth career
- 2005–2010: Figueiredo
- 2010–2011: Xeitosa
- 2011–2017: Sporting Gijón
- 2017–2018: Real Madrid
- 2018–2021: Barcelona

Senior career*
Years	Team	Apps	(Gls)
2021–2023	Valencia B	52	(14)
2022–	Valencia	118	(18)

International career^{‡}
2023–2025	Spain U21	20	(2)
2024	Spain U23	4	(0)
Medal record
Men's football
Representing Spain
Olympic Games
Gold medal – first place	2024 Paris
- * Club domestic league appearances and goals as of 27 May 2026 ‡ National team caps and goals as of 14:30, 20 June 2025 (UTC)

Diego López Noguerol (born 13 May 2002) is a Spanish professional footballer who plays as either a right winger or a forward for La Liga club Valencia. Nicknamed El Guajín (The Kid in Asturian), López has become a fan favorite at the Spanish giant.

== Club career ==
=== Early career ===
Born in Turón, Mieres, Asturias, López began playing football at the youth academy of FC Figueiredo where he scored more than 150 goals, and then Xeitosa CF where he scored 54 goals in his single season with them. His goalscoring earned him a move to the youth academy of Sporting de Gijón, followed by a short stint with Real Madrid, and finally moving to FC Barcelona in 2018.

=== Valencia ===
On 7 July 2021, after finishing his formation, López joined Valencia CF and was initially assigned to moved to the reserves in Tercera División RFEF. He missed the opening matches of the season due to an injury, and made his senior debut on 8 October 2021, coming on as a second-half substitute for Fran Pérez and scoring a brace in a 5–0 home routing of UD Benigànim.

López helped the B-side in their promotion to Segunda Federación with nine goals, and made his professional – and La Liga – debut with Valencia on 29 August 2022, replacing Toni Lato late into a 1–0 loss to Atlético Madrid. He scored his first goal in the top tier on 21 May of the following year, netting the winner in a 1–0 home success over Real Madrid.

On 14 August 2023, López renewed his contract with the Che until 2026, being definitely promoted to the main squad.

== Career statistics ==
=== Club ===
As of match played 11 December 2025

Appearances and goals by club, season and competition
Club	Season	League			Copa del Rey		Total	
Club	Season	Division	Apps	Goals	Apps	Goals	Apps	Goals
Valencia B	2021–22	Tercera División RFEF	30	9	—		30	9
Valencia B	2022–23	Segunda Federación	22	5	—		22	5
Valencia B	Total		52	14	—		52	14
Valencia	2022–23	La Liga	10	3	0	0	10	3
Valencia	2023–24	La Liga	36	3	3	1	39	4
Valencia	2024–25	La Liga	38	8	3	1	41	9
Valencia	2025–27	La Liga	15	3	2	1	17	4
Total			99	17	8	3	107	20
Career total			151	31	8	3	159	34

== Honours ==
Barcelona Youth

- División de Honor: 2019–20, 2020–21

Valencia B

- Tercera División RFEF: 2021–22

Spain U23

- Summer Olympics gold medal: 2024

Individual

- La Liga U23 Player of the Month: March 2025
