= Patacona CF =

Spanish football club

Patacona
- Full name: Patacona Club de Fútbol
- Founded: 2008
- Ground: Municipal de la Patacona, Alboraya, Valencian Community, Spain
- Capacity: 1,000
- President: Salva Pons
- Head coach: Alberto Fito
- League: Primera FFCV – Group 1
- 2025–26: Lliga Comunitat – North, 16th of 18 (relegated)
- Website: https://www.pataconacf.com/
Home colours	Away colours

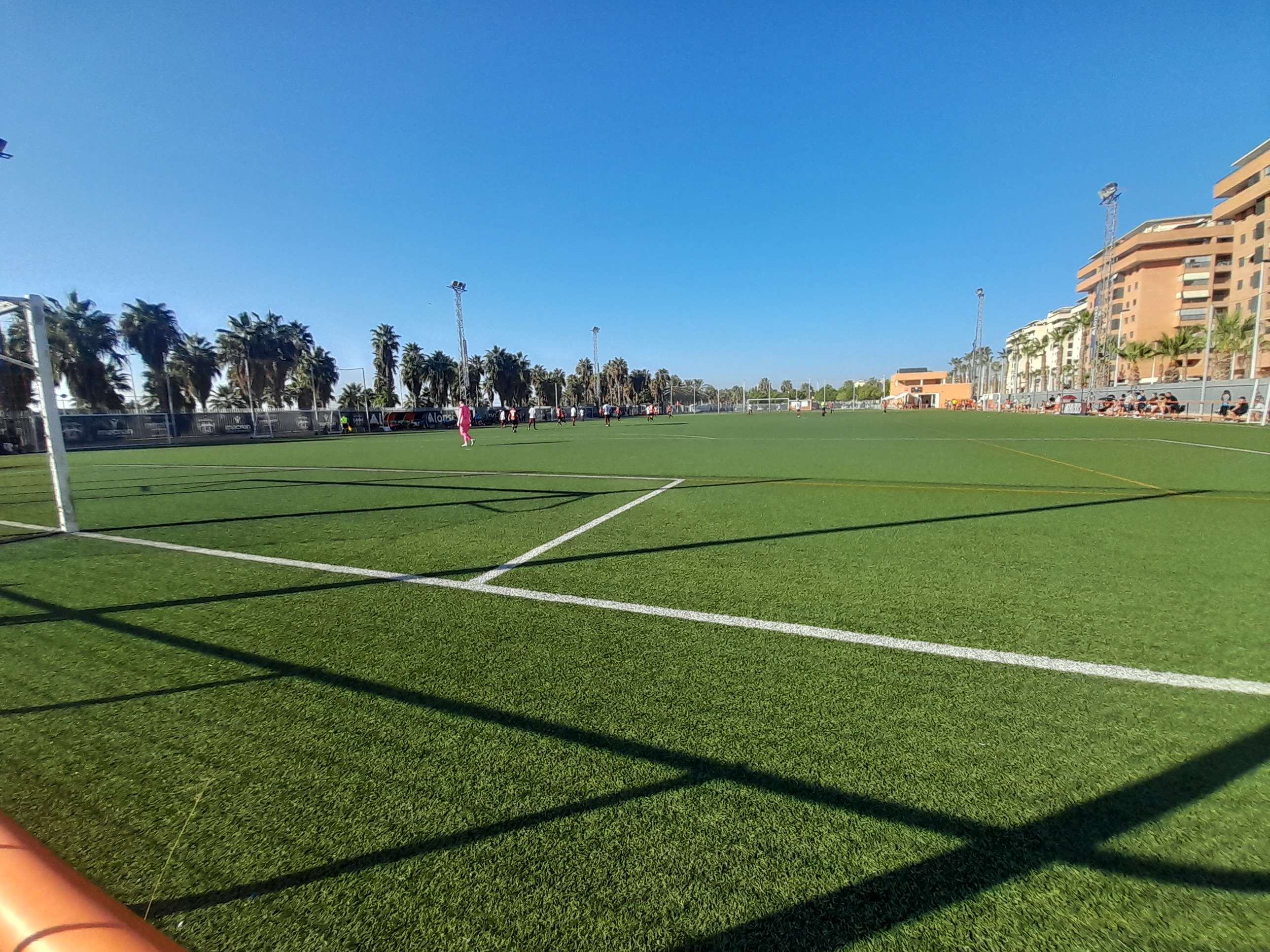
Patacona CF ground

Patacona Club de Fútbol is a Spanish football team based in Alboraya, in the Valencian Community. Founded in 2008, they play in Primera FFCV – Group 1, holding home matches at Campo Municipal de la Patacona, with a capacity of 1,000 people.

The club also had a partnership with Levante UD which began in 2011, with Levante using Patacona as a reserve youth team. The partnership had ended by the 2023-24 season.

== History ==
Founded in 2008, Patacona only started a senior team in 2012, playing for three seasons in the Segunda Regional before only returning to youth football in 2015. The senior squad returned to an active status in 2017, after the club's rebranding, and achieved two consecutive promotions in 2018–19 and 2019–20 to reach the Regional Preferente.

On 3 June 2022, Patacona achieved a first-ever promotion to the Tercera Federación. At the end of the 2024–25 season, they were relegated to the Lliga Comunitat. After one season there, they were relegated again to the Primera FFCV.

== Season to season ==
Season	Tier	Division	Place	Copa del Rey
2012–13	7	2ª Reg.	7th	
2013–14	7	2ª Reg.	5th	
2014–15	7	2ª Reg.	9th	
2015–16	DNP			
2016–17	DNP			
2017–18	7	2ª Reg.	3rd	
2018–19	7	2ª Reg.	1st	
2019–20	6	1ª Reg.	1st	
2020–21	5	Reg. Pref.	2nd	
2021–22	6	Reg. Pref.	1st	
2022–23	5	3ª Fed.	9th	
2023–24	5	3ª Fed.	13th	
2024–25	5	3ª Fed.	17th	
2025–26	6	Lliga Com.	16th	
2026–27	7	1ª FFCV		

- 3 seasons in Tercera Federación
