= 2022 Copa del Rey final =

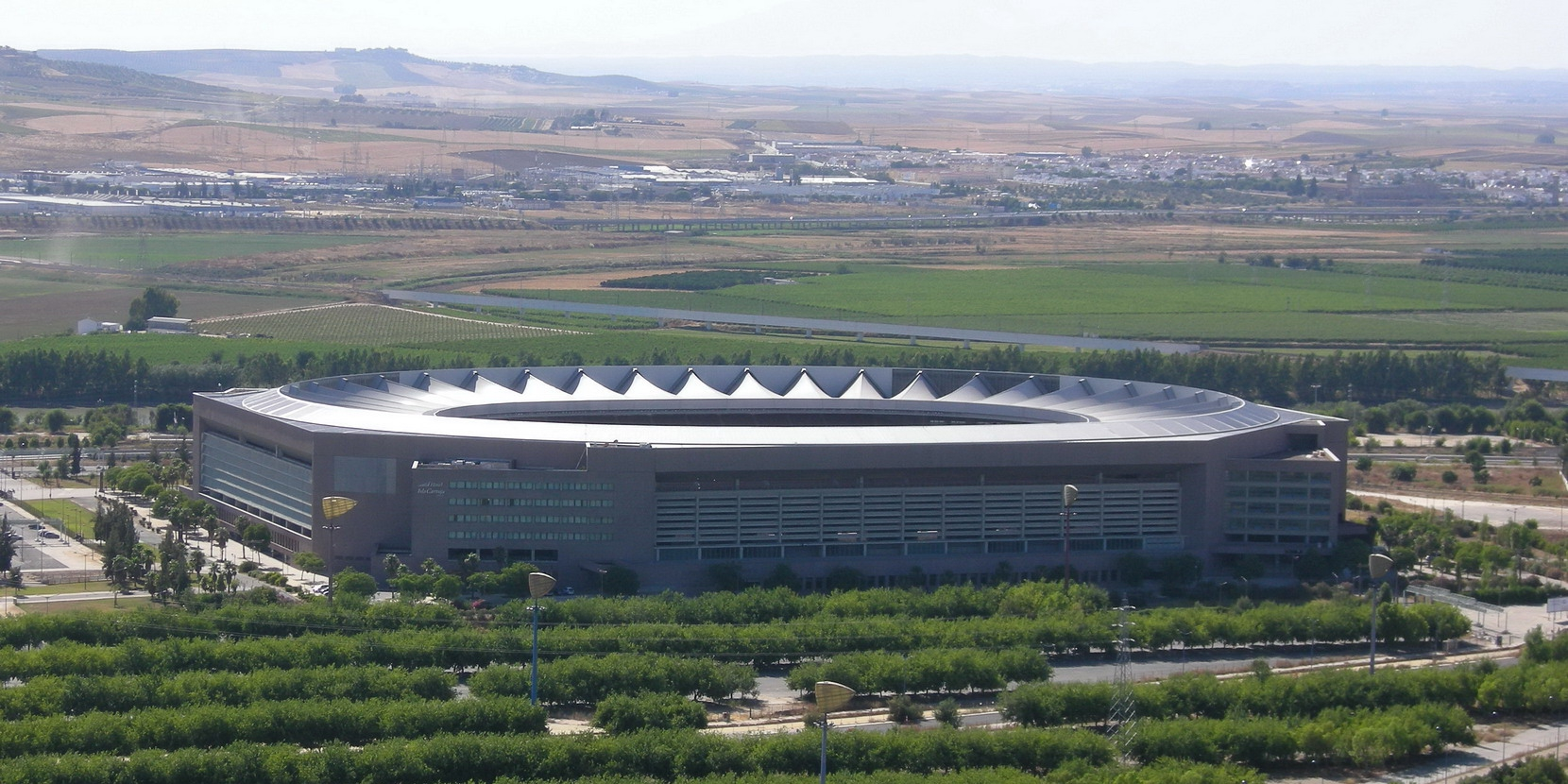
- La Cartuja in Seville hosted the final.
- Event: 2021–22 Copa del Rey
Real Betis	Valencia
1	1
- After extra time Real Betis won 5–4 on penalties
- Date: 23 April 2022
- Venue: La Cartuja, Seville
- Man of the Match: Borja Iglesias (Real Betis)
- Referee: Alejandro Hernández Hernández (Las Palmas)
- Attendance: 53,387

The 2022 Copa del Rey final was a football match that decided the winner of the 2021–22 Copa del Rey, the 120th edition of Spain's primary football cup (including two seasons where two rival editions were played). The match was played on 23 April 2022 at the Estadio de La Cartuja in Seville between Real Betis and Valencia.

Real Betis won 5–4 on penalties following a 1–1 draw after extra time for their third Copa del Rey title.

== Background ==
Alaska and Mario Vaquerizo delivered a musical performance before the game.

== Route to the final ==
Real Betis		Round	Valencia
Opponent	Result		Opponent	Result
Alicante	4–0 (A)	First round	Utrillas	3–0 (A)
Talavera	4–2 (a.e.t.) (A)	Second round	Arenteiro	3–1 (a.e.t.) (A)
Valladolid	3–0 (A)	Round of 32	Cartagena	2–1 (A)
Sevilla	2–1 (H)	Round of 16	Atlético Baleares	1–0 (A)
Real Sociedad	4–0 (A)	Quarter-finals	Cádiz	2–1 (H)
Rayo Vallecano	2–1 (A), 1–1 (H)	Semi-finals	Athletic Bilbao	1–1 (A), 1–0 (H)

Key: (H) = Home; (A) = Away

== Match ==
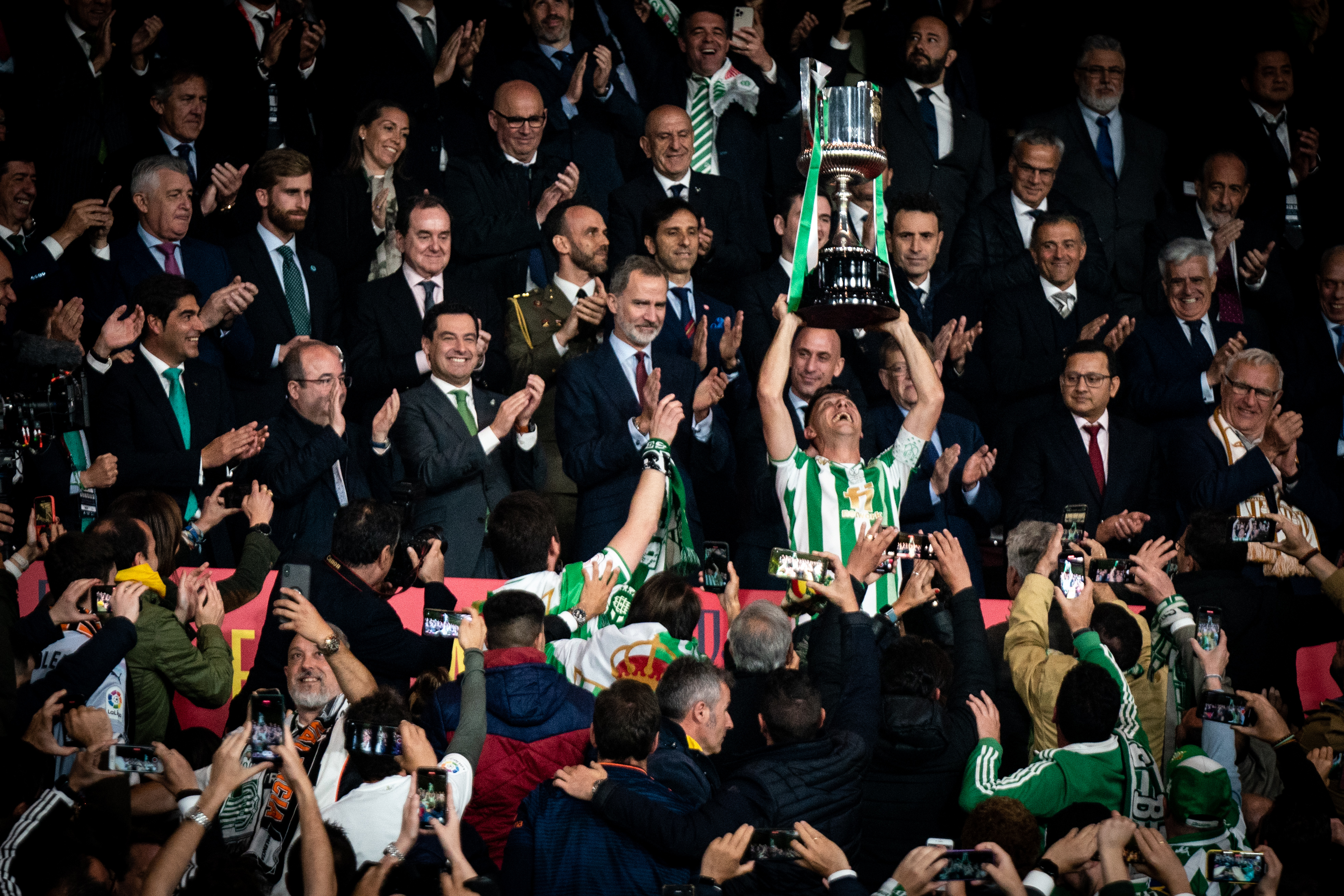
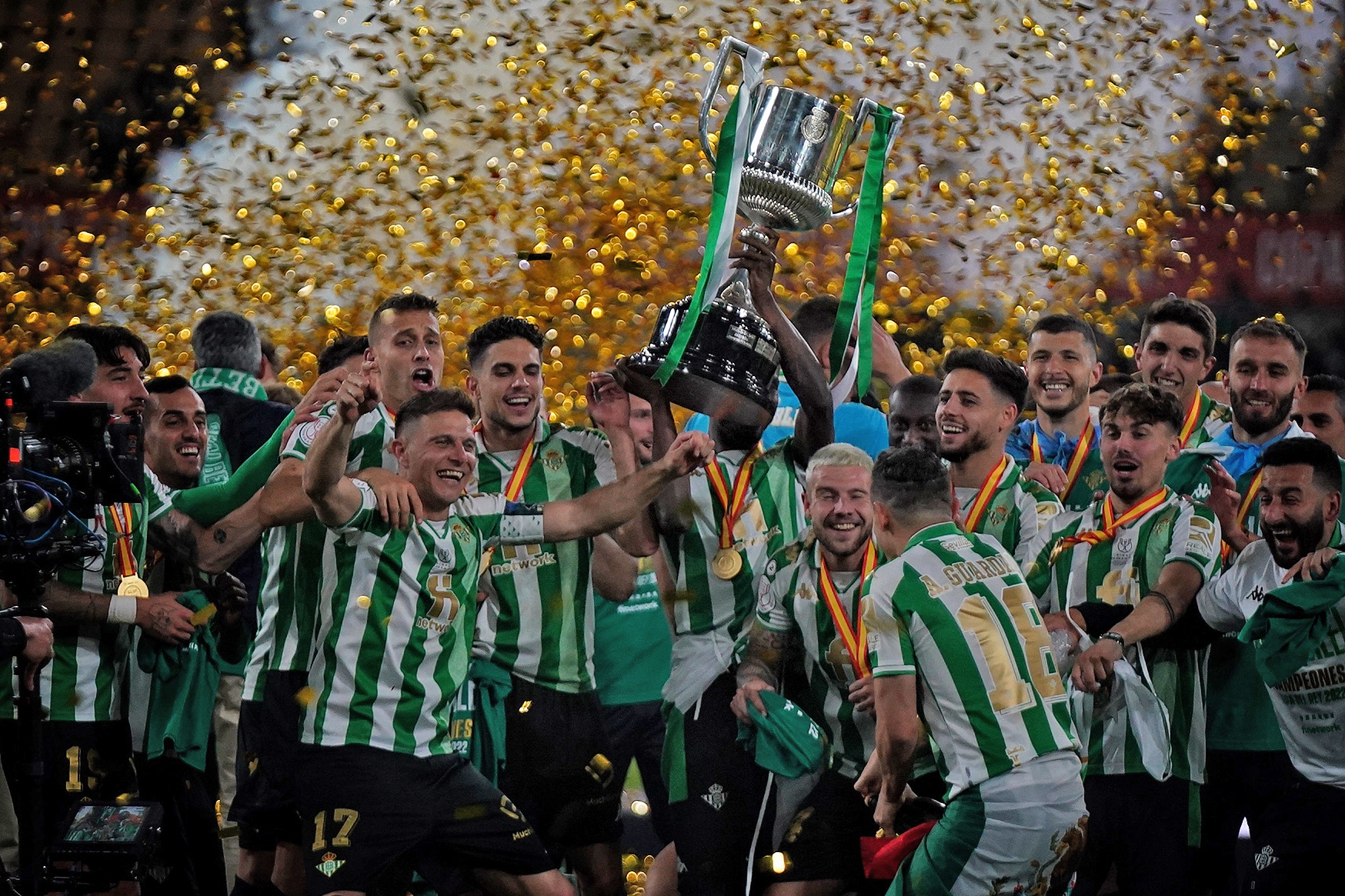
Real Betis celebrating with the Copa del Rey trophy

=== Summary ===
The match went to extra time after a 1–1 draw. After a scoreless extra time period, the match went to penalties. Real Betis left-back, Juan Miranda, scored the winning penalty. He was among the fans when Real Betis last won the competition in 2005.

=== Details ===
23 April 2022
22:00 CEST

Real Betis	1–1 (a.e.t.)	Valencia
Iglesias 11'	Report	Duro 30'
Penalties
Willian José (penalty scored); Joaquín (penalty scored); Guardado (penalty scored); Tello (penalty scored); Miranda (penalty scored)	5–4	(penalty scored) Soler; (penalty scored) Račić; (penalty scored) Guedes; (penalty missed) Musah; (penalty scored) Gayà

La Cartuja, Seville
Attendance: 53,387
Referee: Alejandro Hernández Hernández (Las Palmas)

Real Betis	Valencia

GK	25	(Chile) Claudio Bravo
RB	19	(Spain) Héctor Bellerín
CB	16	(Argentina) Germán Pezzella	(yellow card) 72'
CB	5	(Spain) Marc Bartra
LB	15	(Spain) Álex Moreno		(substituted off) 106'
CM	21	(Argentina) Guido Rodríguez
CM	14	(Portugal) William Carvalho	(yellow card) 14'	(substituted off) 102'
RW	10	(Spain) Sergio Canales (c)		(substituted off) 111'
AM	8	(France) Nabil Fekir		(substituted off) 111'
LW	7	(Spain) Juanmi		(substituted off) 86'
CF	9	(Spain) Borja Iglesias	(yellow card) 95'	(substituted off) 102'
Substitutes:
GK	13	(Portugal) Rui Silva
DF	3	(Spain) Edgar González
DF	6	(Spain) Víctor Ruiz
DF	23	(Senegal) Youssouf Sabaly
DF	33	(Spain) Juan Miranda		(substituted on) 106'
MF	4	(Ivory Coast) Paul Akouokou
MF	18	(Mexico) Andrés Guardado		(substituted on) 102'
MF	28	(Spain) Rodri
FW	11	(Spain) Cristian Tello	(yellow card) 113'	(substituted on) 111'
FW	12	(Brazil) Willian José		(substituted on) 102'
FW	17	(Spain) Joaquín		(substituted on) 86'
FW	24	(Spain) Aitor Ruibal		(substituted on) 111'
Manager:
(Chile) Manuel Pellegrini

GK	28	(Georgia (country)) Giorgi Mamardashvili
CB	12	(France) Mouctar Diakhaby
CB	5	(Brazil) Gabriel Paulista	(yellow card) 5'
CB	15	(Paraguay) Omar Alderete	(yellow card) 90+2'
RWB	20	(Guadeloupe) Dimitri Foulquier		(substituted off) 100'
LWB	14	(Spain) José Gayà (c)
CM	6	(Spain) Hugo Guillamón	(yellow card) 74'	(substituted off) 85'
CM	23	(Guinea) Ilaix Moriba		(substituted off) 79'
RF	10	(Spain) Carlos Soler	(yellow card) 98'
CF	7	(Portugal) Gonçalo Guedes
LF	19	(Spain) Hugo Duro		(substituted off) 85'
Substitutes:
GK	1	(Spain) Jaume Doménech
GK	13	(Netherlands) Jasper Cillessen
DF	2	(Portugal) Thierry Correia	(yellow card) 90+3'	(substituted on) 79'
DF	24	(Switzerland) Eray Cömert
DF	32	(Spain) Jesús Vázquez
DF	37	(Spain) Cristhian Mosquera
MF	4	(United States) Yunus Musah		(substituted on) 100'
MF	8	(Serbia) Uroš Račić		(substituted on) 85'
MF	17	(Russia) Denis Cheryshev
MF	18	(France) Koba Koindredi
FW	11	(Angola) Hélder Costa
FW	21	(Spain) Bryan Gil		(substituted on) 85'
FW	22	(Brazil) Marcos André
Manager:
(Spain) José Bordalás

Man of the Match:
Borja Iglesias (Real Betis)

Assistant referees:
José Enrique Pérez Naranjo (Las Palmas)
Raúl Cabañero Martínez (Region of Murcia)
Fourth official:
César Soto Grado (La Rioja)
Reserve assistant referee:
Diego Sánchez Rojo (Galicia)
Video assistant referee:
Ricardo de Burgos Bengoetxea (Basque Country)
Assistant video assistant referees:
Roberto Díaz Pérez del Palomar (Basque Country)
Pablo González Fuertes (Asturias)

Match rules

- 90 minutes.
- 30 minutes of extra time if necessary.
- Penalty shoot-out if scores still level.
- Maximum of five substitutions, with a sixth allowed in extra time. (Note: Each team was given only three opportunities to make substitutions, with a fourth opportunity in extra time, excluding substitutions made at half-time, before the start of extra time and at half-time in extra time.)
