= Koba Koindredi =

French footballer (born 2001)

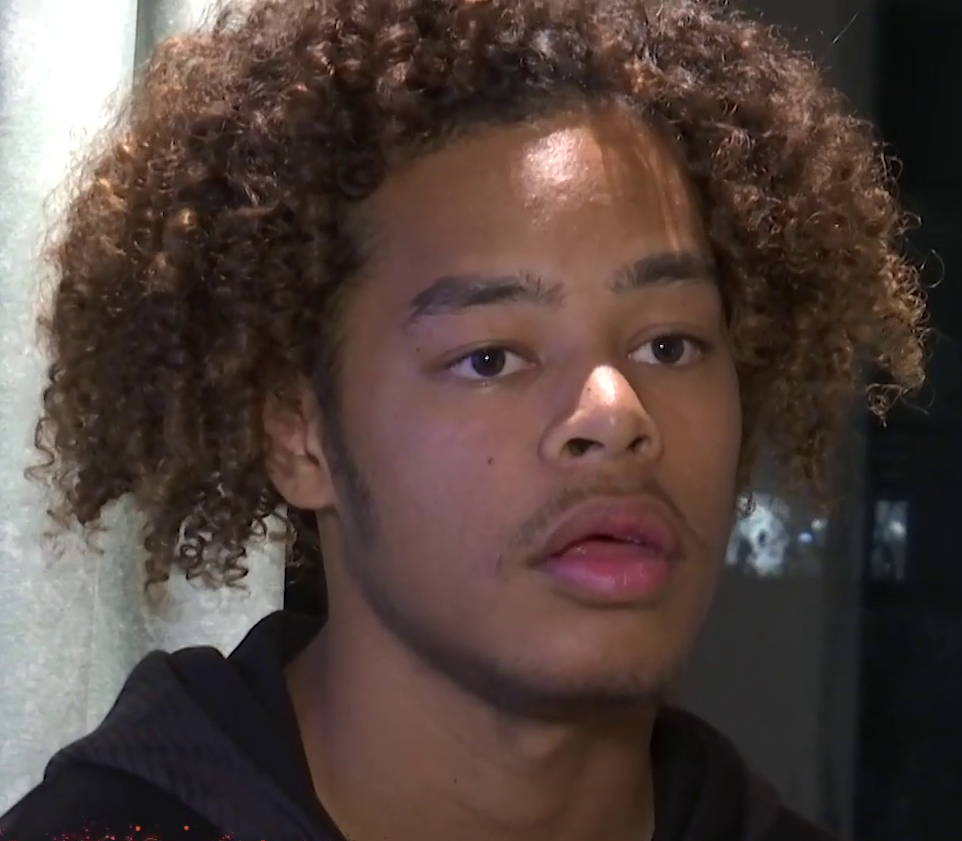
- Koindredi with Valencia

Personal information
- Full name: Koba Leïn Koindredi
- Date of birth: 27 October 2001 (age 25)
- Place of birth: Djibouti, Djibouti
- Height: 1.84 m (6 ft 0 in)
- Position: Central midfielder

Team information
- Current team: Lausanne-Sport
- Number: 88

Youth career
- 2007–2009: Fréjusienne
- 2009–2017: Fréjus Saint-Raphaël
- 2017–2019: Lens
- 2019–2020: Valencia

Senior career*
Years	Team	Apps	(Gls)
2018–2019	Lens II	1	(0)
2019–2021	Valencia B	34	(2)
2020–2024	Valencia	12	(0)
2022–2023	→ Oviedo (loan)	18	(1)
2023–2024	→ Estoril (loan)	11	(0)
2024	Estoril	0	(0)
2024–2026	Sporting CP	4	(0)
2024–2025	→ Lausanne-Sport (loan)	32	(1)
2025–2026	→ Basel (loan)	28	(2)
2026–	Lausanne-Sport	3	(0)

International career^{‡}
2018–2019	France U17	5	(0)
2018–2019	France U18	12	(2)
2019–2020	France U19	9	(1)
- * Club domestic league appearances and goals as of 13 September 2026 ‡ National team caps and goals as of 25 February 2020

Koba Leïn Koindredi (born 27 October 2001) is a French professional footballer who plays as a central midfielder for Swiss Super League club Lausanne-Sport. Born in Djibouti to New Caledonian and Malagasy roots, and raised in Fréjus, Var department, he has represented France at youth level.

== Early life ==
Koindredi was born in Djibouti to a New Caledonian military father who was on a peacekeeping mission in Djibouti; his grandfather from Païta fought for France in World War I. He grew up in Fréjus, in the Var department.

== Club career ==
=== Lens ===
Koindredi joined Lens' youth setup in 2017, from Fréjus Saint-Raphaël. He made his senior debut with the former's reserves on 22 December 2018, aged 17, by playing the last 30 minutes of a 0–1 Championnat National 2 home loss against SC Schiltigheim.

=== Valencia ===
In January 2019, Koindredi moved to Valencia, being initially assigned to the Juvenil A squad. Promoted to the B-team in Segunda División B for the 2019–20 campaign, he scored his first senior goal on 1 September, netting the opener of a 2–2 away draw against Castellón. During the season, he also featured with the Juvenil squad in the UEFA Youth League.

Koindredi made his first team debut on 16 December 2020, starting in a 4–2 away win against Terrassa for the season's Copa del Rey. He made his La Liga debut fourteen days later, coming on as a late substitute for Vicente Esquerdo in a 1–2 away loss against Granada. He scored his first goal for the first team on 17 January 2021 in the last 32 of the cup, opening a 2–0 win against Alcorcón.

On 30 May 2021, after Valencia's reserves were demoted to the fifth-tier Tercera División RFEF following a restructuring, Koindredi extended his contract with the club until June 2025. In their run to the cup final that season, he scored a direct free kick to wrap up a 3–0 win against amateur side Utrillas in the first round on 2 December.

On 25 August 2022, Koindredi moved on loan to Segunda División side Real Oviedo for the season.

=== Estoril ===
On 8 August 2023, Valencia sent Koindredi on a season-long loan to Portuguese Primeira Liga side Estoril. Koba Koindredi played his last game in an Estoril shirt on Saturday, 27 January 2024, in the Portuguese League Cup final that Estoril lost on penalties against Braga. In that game, Koindredi started and was substituted on the 59th minute.

=== Sporting CP ===
On 30 January 2024, Valencia announced that Koindredi had been transferred permanently to Estoril, for a reported fee of €3 million. On the following day, he signed a four-and-a-half-year contract with fellow Primeira Liga club Sporting CP, with his release clause being set at €60 million. The Lions paid a reported €4 million transfer fee.

On 15 February 2024, Koindredi made his debut for Sporting CP, coming off the bench to replace Daniel Bragança in the final minutes of a 3–1 victory away at Young Boys, in the knockout round play-offs of the UEFA Europa League.

=== Return to Lausanne-Sport ===
On 1 September 2026, Koindredi returned to Lausanne-Sport on a three-year contract.

== Career statistics ==
As of match played 24 May 2025

Appearances and goals by club, season and competition
Club	Season	League			National cup (Note: Includes Copa del Rey, Taça de Portugal, Swiss Cup)		League cup (Note: Includes Taça da Liga)		Europe		Total	
Club	Season	Division	Apps	Goals	Apps	Goals	Apps	Goals	Apps	Goals	Apps	Goals
Lens II	2018–19	Championnat National 2	1	0	–		–		–		1	0
Valencia B	2018–19	Segunda División B	3	0	–		–		–		3	0
Valencia B	2019–20	Segunda División B	16	1	–		–		–		16	1
Valencia B	2020–21	Segunda División B	15	1	–		–		–		15	1
Valencia B	Total		34	2	–		–		–		34	2
Valencia	2020–21	La Liga	2	0	4	1	–		–		6	1
Valencia	2021–22	La Liga	10	0	3	1	–		–		13	1
Valencia	Total		12	0	7	2	–		–		19	2
Oviedo (loan)	2022–23	Segunda División	18	1	2	0	–		–		20	1
Estoril (loan)	2023–24	Primeira Liga	11	0	3	0	4	0	–		18	0
Sporting CP	2023–24	Primeira Liga	4	0	1	0	0	0	3 (Note: Appearances in UEFA Europa League)	0	8	0
Lausanne-Sport (loan)	2024–25	Swiss Super League	32	1	4	0	–		–		36	1
Basel (loan)	2025–26	Swiss Super League	0	0	0	0	–		0	0	0	0
Career total			112	4	17	2	4	0	3	0	136	6

== Honours ==
Sporting CP

- Primeira Liga: 2023–24
