= Guillem Molina =

Spanish footballer (born 2000)

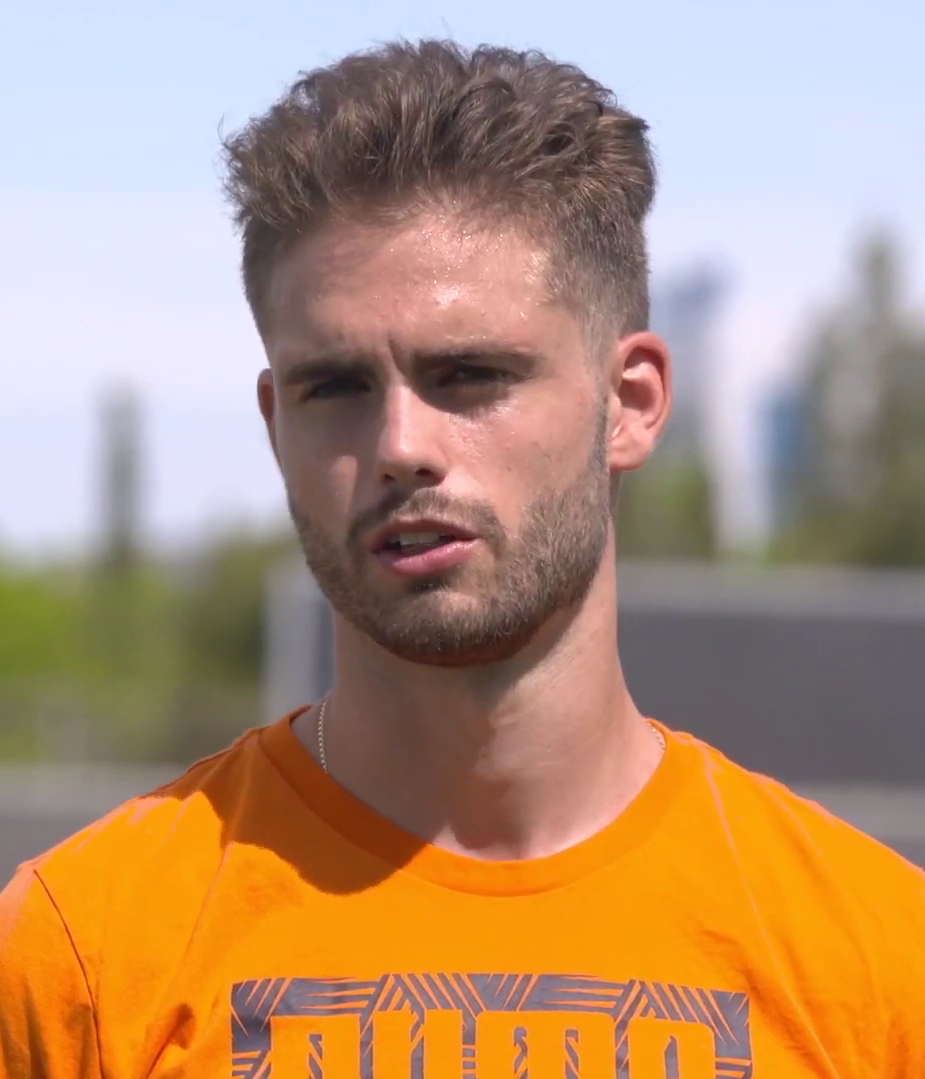

Personal information
- Full name: Guillem Molina Gutiérrez
- Date of birth: 3 May 2000 (age 26)
- Place of birth: Valls, Spain
- Height: 1.83 m (6 ft 0 in)
- Positions: Centre-back; right-back

Team information
- Current team: Huesca
- Number: 15

Youth career
- Reus
- 2014–2018: Valencia

Senior career*
Years	Team	Apps	(Gls)
2018–2021	Valencia B	47	(2)
2020–2021	Valencia	2	(0)
2021–2023	Sabadell	58	(2)
2023–2024	Osasuna B	34	(1)
2024–2025	Ibiza	34	(2)
2025–2026	AVS	9	(0)
2026–	Huesca	3	(0)
- * Club domestic league appearances and goals as of 13 September 2026

Guillem Molina Gutiérrez (born 3 May 2000) is a Spanish professional footballer who plays as a centre-back or right-back for Primera Federación club Huesca.

== Club career ==
Born in Valls, Tarragona, Catalonia, Molina joined Valencia CF's youth setup in 2014, from CF Reus Deportiu. He made his senior debut with the reserves on 25 August 2018, starting in a 2–0 Segunda División B home win against CD Ebro.

Molina scored his first senior goal on 9 February 2020, netting his team's first in a 2–2 home draw against UE Olot. On 17 July, he renewed his contract until 2023.

Molina made his first team debut on 16 December 2020, starting and being sent off in a 4–2 away win against Terrassa FC, for the season's Copa del Rey. His La Liga debut occurred on six days later, after coming on as a first-half substitute for Gabriel Paulista in a 0–1 home loss against Sevilla FC.

On 11 August 2021, Molina signed for CE Sabadell FC in Primera División RFEF.

On 2 August 2024, Molina joined Primera Federación club Ibiza.

On 16 July 2025, Molina signed a two-year contract with AVS in the Portuguese top tier.

== Career statistics ==
=== Club ===
As of match played 9 May 2021

Appearances and goals by club, season and competition
Club	Season	League			National Cup		Other		Total	
Club	Season	Division	Apps	Goals	Apps	Goals	Apps	Goals	Apps	Goals
Valencia B	2018–19	Segunda División B	17	0	—		—		17	0
Valencia B	2019–20	Segunda División B	15	1	—		—		15	1
Valencia B	2020–21	Segunda División B	15	1	—		—		15	1
Valencia B	Total		47	2	0	0	0	0	47	2
Valencia	2020–21	La Liga	2	0	3	0	—		5	0
Career total			49	2	3	0	0	0	52	2
