= 2019 Copa del Rey final =

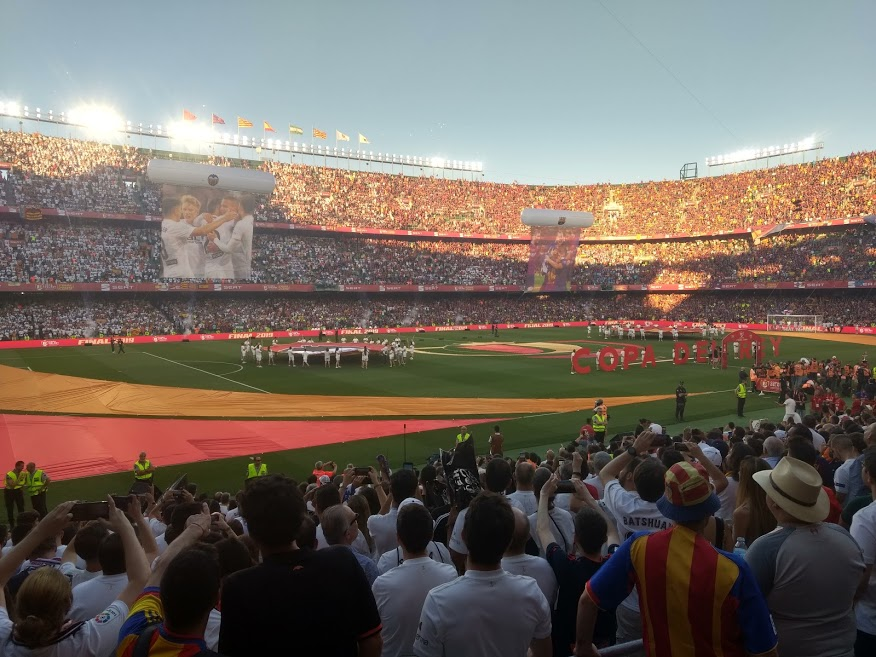
- Estadio Benito Villamarín in Seville hosted the final
- Event: 2018–19 Copa del Rey
Barcelona	Valencia
1	2
- Date: 25 May 2019
- Venue: Benito Villamarín, Seville
- Referee: Alberto Undiano Mallenco
- Attendance: 53,698

The 2019 Copa del Rey final was a football match played on 25 May 2019 that decided the winner of the 2018–19 Copa del Rey, the 117th edition of Spain's primary football cup (including two seasons where two rival editions were played). The match was played at the Estadio Benito Villamarín in Seville between Barcelona and Valencia. As of 2025, this was the latest final to be held outside of Estadio de La Cartuja.

Valencia won the final 2–1, achieving their eighth title overall and ending their 11-year trophy drought by winning their first major trophy since 2008.

== Background ==
Barcelona were competing in their 41st Copa del Rey final, extending the competition record, and had won a record 30 titles prior. They were the reigning champions, having defeated Sevilla 5–0 in the 2018 final. The match was their sixth consecutive final, extending the record they set in the previous season, and were seeking a fifth consecutive title, a feat never accomplished before (only Real Madrid and Athletic Bilbao have also previously won four titles consecutively).

Valencia were competing in their 17th Copa del Rey final, and would go on to win their 8th title. Their last title win had come in the 2008 final defeating Getafe 3–1.

In reaching the final, both teams were assured qualification for the four-team 2020 Supercopa de España.

== Route to the final ==
Barcelona			Round	Valencia
Opponent	Result	Legs		Opponent	Result	Legs
Cultural Leonesa	5–1	1–0 away; 4–1 home	Round of 32	Ebro	3–1	2–1 away; 1–0 home
Levante	4–2	1–2 away; 3–0 home	Round of 16	Sporting Gijón	4–2	1–2 away; 3–0 home
Sevilla	6–3	0–2 away; 6–1 home	Quarter-finals	Getafe	3–2	0–1 away; 3–1 home
Real Madrid	4–1	1–1 home; 3–0 away	Semi-finals	Real Betis	3–2	2–2 away; 1–0 home

== Match ==
=== Details ===
25 May 2019
21:00 UTC+2

Barcelona	1–2	Valencia
Messi 73'	Report	Gameiro 21'; Rodrigo 33'

Benito Villamarín, Seville
Attendance: 53,698
Referee: Alberto Undiano Mallenco

Barcelona	Valencia

GK	13	(Netherlands) Jasper Cillessen
RB	2	(Portugal) Nélson Semedo		(substituted off) 46'
CB	3	(Spain) Gerard Piqué
CB	15	(France) Clément Lenglet
LB	18	(Spain) Jordi Alba
CM	8	(Brazil) Arthur		(substituted off) 46'
CM	5	(Spain) Sergio Busquets	(yellow card) 61'
CM	4	(Croatia) Ivan Rakitić		(substituted off) 76'
RW	20	(Spain) Sergi Roberto
CF	10	(Argentina) Lionel Messi (c)
LW	7	(Brazil) Philippe Coutinho
Substitutes:
GK	30	(Spain) Iñaki Peña
DF	23	(France) Samuel Umtiti
DF	24	(Belgium) Thomas Vermaelen
MF	14	(Brazil) Malcom		(substituted on) 46'
MF	21	(Spain) Carles Aleñá		(substituted on) 76'
MF	22	(Chile) Arturo Vidal	(yellow card) 89'	(substituted on) 46'
MF	43	(Spain) Carles Pérez
Manager:
(Spain) Ernesto Valverde

GK	1	(Spain) Jaume Doménech
RB	18	(Denmark) Daniel Wass
CB	24	(Argentina) Ezequiel Garay
CB	5	(Brazil) Gabriel
LB	14	(Spain) José Gayà	(yellow card) 53'
RM	8	(Spain) Carlos Soler
CM	10	(Spain) Dani Parejo (c)		(substituted off) 65'
CM	17	(France) Francis Coquelin
LM	7	(Portugal) Gonçalo Guedes
CF	19	(Spain) Rodrigo		(substituted off) 88'
CF	9	(France) Kevin Gameiro		(substituted off) 72'
Substitutes:
GK	13	(Brazil) Neto
DF	12	(France) Mouctar Diakhaby		(substituted on) 88'
DF	15	(Spain) Toni Lato
DF	21	(Italy) Cristiano Piccini		(substituted on) 72'
MF	6	(Central African Republic) Geoffrey Kondogbia	(yellow card) 70'	(substituted on) 65'
MF	20	(Spain) Ferran Torres
FW	22	(Spain) Santi Mina
Manager:
(Spain) Marcelino
