= 2020–21 Valencia CF season =

Valencia CF
2020–21 season
- Owner: Peter Lim
- President: Anil Murthy
- Head coach: Javi Gracia (until 3 May); Voro (interim, from 3 May)
- Stadium: Mestalla
- La Liga: 13th
- Copa del Rey: Round of 16
- Top goalscorer: League: Carlos Soler (11); All: Carlos Soler (12)
- Biggest win: 4–1 vs Real Madrid; 4–1 vs Yeclano; 4–1 vs Eibar
- Biggest defeat: 0–3 vs Sevilla; 0–3 vs Getafe
Home colours	Away colours	Third colours

The 2020–21 season was the 101st season in the existence of Valencia CF and its 86th consecutive season in La Liga, the top flight of Spanish football. In addition to the domestic league, Valencia participated in this season's edition of the Copa del Rey. The season covered the period from 20 July 2020 to 30 June 2021, with the late start to the season due to the COVID-19 pandemic in Spain.

The season was the first since 2010–11 without former captain Dani Parejo, who departed to Villarreal, and the first since 2013–14 without Rodrigo, who departed to Leeds United.

== Players ==
=== Squad information ===
No.	Pos.	Nat.	Name	Date of birth (Age)	Signed in	Contract ends	Signed from
Goalkeepers
1	GK	(Spain)	Jaume Doménech	5 November 1990 (age 36)	2015	2022	(Spain) Valencia Mestalla
13	GK	(Netherlands)	Jasper Cillessen	22 April 1989 (age 37)	2019	2023	(Spain) Barcelona
25	GK	(Spain)	Cristian Rivero	21 March 1998 (age 28)	2019	2022	(Spain) Valencia Mestalla
Defenders
2	DF	(Portugal)	Thierry Correia	9 March 1999 (age 27)	2019	2024	(Portugal) Sporting CP
3	DF	(Spain)	Toni Lato	21 October 1997 (age 29)	2017	2023	(Spain) Valencia Mestalla
4	DF	(France)	Eliaquim Mangala	13 February 1991 (age 35)	2019	2021	(England) Manchester City
5	DF	(Brazil)	Gabriel Paulista	26 November 1990 (age 35)	2017	2022	(England) Arsenal
6	DF	(Portugal)	Ferro	26 March 1997 (age 29)	2021 (Loan)	2021	(Portugal) Benfica
12	DF	(France)	Mouctar Diakhaby	19 December 1996 (age 29)	2018	2023	(France) Lyon
14	DF	(Spain)	José Luis Gayà (Captain)	25 May 1995 (age 31)	2012	2023	(Spain) Valencia Mestalla
15	DF	(Spain)	Hugo Guillamón	31 January 2000 (age 26)	2018	2023	(Spain) Valencia Mestalla
Midfielders
8	MF	(Spain)	Carlos Soler	2 January 1997 (age 29)	2016	2023	(Spain) Valencia Mestalla
10	MF	(Uruguay)	Christian Oliva	1 June 1996 (age 30)	2021 (Loan)	2021	(Italy) Cagliari
18	MF	(Denmark)	Daniel Wass	31 May 1989 (age 37)	2018	2022	(Spain) Celta Vigo
19	MF	(Serbia)	Uroš Račić	17 March 1998 (age 28)	2018	2024	(Serbia) Red Star Belgrade
20	MF	(South Korea)	Lee Kang-in	19 February 2001 (age 25)	2018	2022	(Spain) Valencia Mestalla
23	MF	(Spain)	Jason	7 June 1994 (age 32)	2019	2022	(Spain) Levante UD
26	MF	(Spain)	Vicente Esquerdo	2 January 1999 (age 27)	2018	2022	(Spain) Valencia Mestalla
30	MF	(United States)	Yunus Musah	29 November 2002 (age 23)	2019	2022	(Spain) Valencia Mestalla
Forwards
7	FW	(Portugal)	Gonçalo Guedes	29 November 1996 (age 29)	2017	2023	(France) Paris Saint-Germain
9	FW	(France)	Kevin Gameiro	9 May 1987 (age 39)	2018	2021	(Spain) Atlético Madrid
11	FW	(Italy)	Patrick Cutrone	3 January 1998 (age 28)	2021 (Loan)	2021	(England) Wolverhampton Wanderers
17	FW	(Russia)	Denis Cheryshev	26 November 1990 (age 35)	2018	2022	(Spain) Villarreal
21	FW	(Spain)	Manu Vallejo	14 February 1997 (age 29)	2019	2024	(Spain) Cádiz
22	FW	(Uruguay)	Maxi Gómez	14 August 1996 (age 30)	2019	2024	(Spain) Celta Vigo
37	FW	(Spain)	Álex Blanco	16 December 1998 (age 27)	2018	2021	(Spain) Valencia Mestalla
Players who left during season
6	MF	(Central African Republic)	Geoffrey Kondogbia	15 February 1993 (age 33)	2017	2022	(Spain) Atlético Madrid

=== Reserve team ===
Note: Flags indicate national team as defined under FIFA eligibility rules; some limited exceptions apply. Players may hold more than one non-FIFA nationality.

No. / Pos. / Nation / Player; 31 / DF / ESP / Guillem Molina	No. / Pos. / Nation / Player; 38 / FW / ESP / Pablo Gozalbez

=== Out on loan ===
Note: Flags indicate national team as defined under FIFA eligibility rules; some limited exceptions apply. Players may hold more than one non-FIFA nationality.

No.	Pos.	Nation	Player
—	DF	ESP	Jorge Sáenz (at (Spain) Celta Vigo until 30 June 2021)
32	DF	ESP	Javi Jiménez (at (Spain) Albacete until 30 June 2021)

No.	Pos.	Nation	Player
—	DF	ESP	Adrià Guerrero (at (Switzerland) Lugano until 30 June 2021)
21	FW	ESP	Rubén Sobrino (at (Spain) Cádiz until 30 June 2021)

== Transfers ==
=== In ===
No.	Pos	Player	Transferred from	Fee	Date	Source
3	DF	(Spain) Toni Lato	(Spain) Osasuna	Loan return	31 July 2020	
23	MF	(Spain) Jason	(Spain) Getafe	Loan return	31 July 2020	
32	DF	(Spain) Álex Centelles	(Portugal) Famalicão	Loan return	31 July 2020	
19	MF	(Serbia) Uroš Račić	(Portugal) Famalicão	Loan return	31 July 2020	
	MF	(Spain) Álex Carbonell	(Netherlands) Fortuna Sittard	Loan return	31 July 2020	
37	FW	(Spain) Álex Blanco	(Spain) Zaragoza	Loan return	31 July 2020	
24	MF	(Italy) Cristiano Piccini	(Italy) Atalanta	Loan return	23 January 2021	
11	FW	(Italy) Patrick Cutrone	(England) Wolverhampton Wanderers	Season loan	31 January 2021	
6	DF	(Portugal) Ferro	(Portugal) Benfica	Season loan	31 January 2021	
10	MF	(Uruguay) Christian Oliva	(Italy) Cagliari	Season loan	1 February 2021	

=== Out ===
No.	Pos	Player	Transferred to	Fee	Date	Source
3	DF	(Spain) Jaume Costa	(Spain) Villarreal	Loan return	31 July 2020	
25	DF	(Italy) Alessandro Florenzi	(Italy) Roma	Loan return	31 July 2020	
	DF	(Spain) Jorge Sáenz	(Spain) Celta Vigo	Season loan	31 July 2020	
20	FW	(Spain) Ferran Torres	(England) Manchester City	€27,000,000	4 August 2020	
17	MF	(France) Francis Coquelin	(Spain) Villarreal	€11,000,000	12 August 2020	
10	MF	(Spain) Dani Parejo	(Spain) Villarreal	Free	12 August 2020	
32	DF	(Spain) Javier Jiménez	(Spain) Albacete	Season loan	13 August 2020	
	DF	(Spain) Adrià Guerrero	(Switzerland) Lugano	Season loan	20 August 2020	
19	FW	(Spain) Rodrigo	(England) Leeds United	€35,000,000	25 August 2020	
21	DF	(Italy) Cristiano Piccini	(Italy) Atalanta	Season loan + option to buy at €3,000,000	9 September 2020	
	MF	(Spain) Álex Carbonell	(Switzerland) FC Luzern	Free	25 September 2020	
	MF	(Spain) Álex Centelles	(Spain) UD Almería	Free	2 October 2020	
	FW	(Spain) Jordi Escobar	(Spain) UD Almería	€2.50m	5 October 2020	
6	MF	(Central African Republic) Geoffrey Kondogbia	(Spain) Atlético Madrid	£18,000,000	3 November 2020	
11	FW	(Spain) Rubén Sobrino	(Spain) Cádiz	Season loan	31 January 2021	

== Pre-season and friendlies ==
Win Draw Loss

22 August 2020 Friendly	Valencia	1–0	Castellón	Paterna, Spain
19:00 CEST (UTC+2)	Vallejo 77'	Report		Stadium: Ciudad Deportiva de Paterna; Attendance: 0 Referee: Iván Muñoz Pérez

28 August 2020 Friendly	Valencia	2–1	Villarreal	San Pedro del Pinatar, Spain
20:00 CEST (UTC+2)	Gayà (yellow card) 56'; Mangala (yellow card) 60'; Gómez 65', 74', (yellow card) 77'	Report	Chukwueze 8'; Coquelin (yellow card) 34'; Parejo (yellow card) 83'; Costa (yellow card) 85'	Stadium: Pinatar Arena; Attendance: 0 Referee: Francisco Hernández Maeso

29 August 2020 Friendly	Levante	0–0	Valencia	San Pedro del Pinatar, Spain
19:00 CEST (UTC+2)	Coke (yellow card) 89'	Report	Račić (yellow card) 90+1'	Stadium: Pinatar Arena; Attendance: 0 Referee: Rafael Sánchez López

5 September 2020 Friendly	Valencia	3–1	Cartagena	Paterna, Spain
19:00 CEST (UTC+2)	Lee Kang-in 69', 80'; Jason 73'	Report	Gabriel 64' (o.g.)	Stadium: Ciudad Deportiva de Paterna; Attendance: 0

== Competitions ==
=== Overall record ===
Competition	First match	Last match	Starting round	Final position	Record							
Competition	First match	Last match	Starting round	Final position	Pld	W	D	L	GF	GA	GD	Win %
La Liga	13 September 2020	22 May 2021	Matchday 1	13th	38	10	13	15	50	53	−3	26.32
Copa del Rey	16 December 2020	27 January 2021	First round	Round of 16	4	3	0	1	10	6	+4	75.00
Total					42	13	13	16	60	59	+1	30.95

Source: Soccerway

=== La Liga ===
==== League table ====
Pos	Team	Pld	W	D	L	GF	GA	GD	Pts
11	Osasuna	38	11	11	16	37	48	−11	44 (Note: Osasuna finished ahead of Cádiz on head-to-head points: Cádiz 0–2 Osasuna, Osasuna 3–2 Cádiz.)
12	Cádiz	38	11	11	16	36	58	−22	44
13	Valencia	38	10	13	15	50	53	−3	43
14	Levante	38	9	14	15	46	57	−11	41
15	Getafe	38	9	11	18	28	43	−15	38

Source: La Liga
Rules for classification: 1) Points; 2) Head-to-head points; 3) Head-to-head goal difference; 4) Goal difference; 5) Goals scored; 6) Fair-play points (Note: Head-to-head record is used only after all the matches between the teams in question have been played)

==== Results summary ====
Overall								Home						Away					
Pld	W	D	L	GF	GA	GD	Pts	W	D	L	GF	GA	GD	W	D	L	GF	GA	GD
38	10	13	15	50	53	−3	43	8	7	4	34	23	+11	2	6	11	16	30	−14

Source: La Liga

==== Results by round ====
Round	1	2	3	4	5	6	7	8	9	10	11	12	13	14	15	16	17	18	19	20	21	22	23	24	25	26	27	28	29	30	31	32	33	34	35	36	37	38
Ground	H	A	H	A	H	A	A	H	H	A	H	A	H	A	H	A	H	A	H	A	H	A	A	H	A	H	A	H	A	H	A	H	A	H	H	A	H	A
Result	W	L	D	W	L	L	L	D	W	D	L	D	D	D	L	L	D	W	D	L	W	D	L	W	L	W	L	W	L	D	L	D	D	L	W	L	W	D
Position	1	5	5	2	8	12	14	13	9	9	14	13	12	13	14	17	17	14	14	14	14	12	13	12	14	12	12	12	12	13	14	14	14	14	13	14	13	13

Source: La Liga
A = Away; H = Home; W = Win; D = Draw; L = Loss

==== Matches ====
The league fixtures were announced on 31 August 2020.

13 September 2020 1	Valencia	4–2	Levante	Valencia
21:00 CEST (UTC+2)	Gabriel 12'; Gómez 39'; Vallejo 75', 90+4'; Račić (yellow card) 89'	Report	Morales 1', 36'; Radoja (yellow card) 52'; Róber (yellow card) 63'; Koke (yellow card) 90+5'	Stadium: Mestalla; Attendance: 0 (Note: The match was played behind closed doors due to the COVID-19 pandemic in Spain.); Referee: José María Sánchez Martínez

19 September 2020 2	Celta Vigo	2–1	Valencia	Vigo
21:00 CEST (UTC+2)	Aspas 13', 57'; Tapia (yellow card) 25'; Yokuşlu (yellow card) 90+2'; Villar (yellow card) 90+7'	Report	Gómez 46'; Esquerdo (yellow card) 55'	Stadium: Balaídos; Attendance: 0 Referee: Jesús Gil Manzano

26 September 2020 3	Valencia	1–1	Huesca	Valencia
16:00 CEST (UTC+2)	Wass 38'	Report	Siovas 63'; Galán (yellow card) 64'	Stadium: Mestalla; Attendance: 0 Referee: José Luis Munuera Montero

29 September 2020 4	Real Sociedad	0–1	Valencia	San Sebastián
19:00 CEST (UTC+2)	Zubimendi (yellow card) 35'	Report	Kondogbia (yellow card) 17'; Gómez (yellow card) 45+2', (goal) 75'; Wass (yellow card) 60'; Gayà (yellow card) 61'; Correia (yellow card) 87'	Stadium: Anoeta; Attendance: 0 Referee: Jorge Figueroa Vázquez

3 October 2020 5	Valencia	0–2	Real Betis	Valencia
21:00 CEST (UTC+2)	Guedes (yellow card) 12'; Guillamón (yellow card) 45'	Report	Bartra (yellow card) 2'; Canales 19', (yellow card) 53'; Tello 74'	Stadium: Mestalla; Attendance: 0 Referee: Guillermo Cuadra Fernández

18 October 2020 6	Villarreal	2–1	Valencia	Villarreal
16:00 CEST (UTC+2)	Alcácer 6' (pen.); Iborra (yellow card) 12'; Pedraza (yellow card) 52'; Parejo 69'; Kubo (yellow card) 72' (yellow-red card) 90+2'	Report	Guedes 37'; Gabriel (yellow card) 84'	Stadium: Estadio de la Cerámica; Attendance: 0 Referee: Carlos del Cerro Grande

23 October 2020 7	Elche	2–1	Valencia	Elche
21:00 CEST (UTC+2)	Josan 19'; Fidel 37', (yellow card) 86'; Guti (yellow card) 77'; Barragán (yellow card) 90+3'	Report	Gabriel (yellow card) 45'; Lato 74', (yellow card) 90+5'	Stadium: Estadio Manuel Martínez Valero; Attendance: 0 Referee: César Soto Grado

1 November 2020 8	Valencia	2–2	Getafe	Valencia
21:00 CET (UTC+1)	Musah 22', (yellow card) 69'; Guillamón (yellow card) 32'; Gabriel (yellow card) 41'; Correia (yellow card) 48' (yellow-red card) 56'; Gómez (yellow card) 61'; Cheryshev (yellow card) 76'; Wass (yellow card) 82'; Soler 90+10' (pen.)	Report	Arambarri (yellow card) 72'; Hernández 87'; Suárez (yellow card) 90' (yellow-red card) 90+8'; Ángel 90+4'; Djené (yellow card) 90+6'; Mata (yellow card) 90+9'	Stadium: Mestalla; Attendance: 0 Referee: Jorge Figueroa Vázquez

8 November 2020 9	Valencia	4–1	Real Madrid	Valencia
21:00 CET (UTC+1)	Soler 35' (pen.), 54' (pen.), 64' (pen.), (yellow card) 41'; Varane 43' (o.g.); Guillamón (yellow card) 84'; Doménech (yellow card) 86'	Report	Benzema 23'; Marcelo (yellow card) 52'; Ramos (yellow card) 62'	Stadium: Mestalla; Attendance: 0 Referee: Jesús Gil Manzano

22 November 2020 10	Alavés	2–2	Valencia	Vitoria-Gasteiz
21:00 CET (UTC+1)	Navarro 2'; Pérez 16' (pen.); Lejeune (yellow card) 37'	Report	Guillamón (yellow card) 53', (goal) 77'; Vallejo 72'	Stadium: Mendizorrotza; Attendance: 0 Referee: Santiago Jaime Latre

28 November 2020 11	Valencia	0–1	Atlético Madrid	Valencia
16:15 CET (UTC+1)	Račić (yellow card) 28'; Guillamón (yellow card) 57'	Report	Saúl (yellow card) 43'; Correa (yellow card) 62'; Llorente (yellow card) 76'; Lato 79' (o.g.); Félix (yellow card) 81'; Koke (yellow card) 83'	Stadium: Mestalla; Attendance: 0 Referee: Ricardo de Burgos Bengoetxea

7 December 2020 12	Eibar	0–0	Valencia	Eibar
21:00 CET (UTC+1)	Burgos (yellow card) 42'; Arbilla (yellow card) 44'; Álvarez (yellow card) 69'	Report	Račić (yellow card) 57'; Gómez (yellow card) 90+3'	Stadium: Ipurua; Attendance: 0 Referee: Xavier Estrada Fernández

12 December 2020 13	Valencia	2–2	Athletic Bilbao	Valencia
14:00 CET (UTC+1)	Soler 26' (pen.); Gómez (yellow card) 36'; Vallejo 83'; Jason (yellow card) 90+1'	Report	Vesga (yellow card) 31'; Villalibre 55'; D. García (yellow card) 61'; López (yellow card) 73'; R. García 79' (pen.), (yellow card) 90+4'; Álvarez (yellow card) 82'; Berenguer (yellow card) 84'	Stadium: Mestalla; Attendance: 0 Referee: Carlos del Cerro Grande

19 December 2020 14	Barcelona	2–2	Valencia	Barcelona
16:15 CET (UTC+1)	Griezmann (yellow card) 13'; Messi (penalty missed) 45+4', 45+4'; Araújo 52'; Mingueza (yellow card) 56'; Alba (yellow card) 90+1'; Lenglet (yellow card) 90+2'	Report	Diakhaby 29'; Gayà (yellow card) 45+4'; Blanco (yellow card) 45+7'; Gómez 69'	Stadium: Camp Nou; Attendance: 0 Referee: Alejandro Hernández Hernández

22 December 2020 15	Valencia	0–1	Sevilla	Valencia
17:30 CET (UTC+1)	Wass (yellow card) 45+2'; Soler (yellow card) 71'; Molina (yellow card) 78'	Report	De Jong (yellow card) 55'; Suso 81'; Jordán (yellow card) 83'	Stadium: Mestalla; Attendance: 0 Referee: Valentín Pizarro Gómez

30 December 2020 16	Granada	2–1	Valencia	Granada
17:00 CET (UTC+1)	Foulquier (yellow card) 16'; Herrera (yellow card) 40'; Kenedy 45+3'; Puertas (yellow card) 72'; Duarte (red card) 76'; Molina 88'; Gonalons (yellow card) 90+5'	Report	Jason (yellow card) 9' (yellow-red card) 70'; Wass (yellow card) 33'; Gameiro 36'; Mangala (yellow card) 48'; Guedes (red card) 73'	Stadium: Nuevo Los Cármenes; Attendance: 0 Referee: Adrián Cordero Vega

4 January 2021 17	Valencia	1–1	Cádiz	Valencia
21:00 CET (UTC+1)	Cheryshev (yellow card) 16'; Guillamón (yellow card) 18'; Gómez 79'	Report	Lozano (yellow card) 36', (goal) 58'; Negredo (yellow card) 69'	Stadium: Mestalla; Attendance: 0 Referee: David Medié Jiménez

10 January 2021 18	Valladolid	0–1	Valencia	Valladolid
21:00 CET (UTC+1)	Bruno (yellow card) 23'; Orellana (yellow card) 86'	Report	Soler (yellow card) 58', (goal) 76'; Diakhaby (yellow card) 82'; Correia (yellow card) 90+5'	Stadium: José Zorrilla; Attendance: 0 Referee: Guillermo Cuadra Fernández

21 January 2021 19	Valencia	1–1	Osasuna	Valencia
19:00 CET (UTC+1)	Wass (yellow card) 60'; U. García 69' (o.g.)	Report	Calleri 42'; Vidal (yellow card) 45+1'; Cruz (yellow card) 71'; Sánchez (yellow card) 77'	Stadium: Mestalla; Attendance: 0 Referee: Alejandro Hernández Hernández

24 January 2021 20	Atlético Madrid	3–1	Valencia	Madrid
21:00 CET (UTC+1)	Félix 23'; Vrsaljko (yellow card) 30'; Suárez 54'; Correa 72'; Savić (yellow card) 76'	Report	Račić 11'	Stadium: Wanda Metropolitano; Attendance: 0 Referee: Ricardo de Burgos Bengoetxea

30 January 2021 21	Valencia	1–0	Elche	Valencia
18:30 CET (UTC+1)	Wass 22', (yellow card) 70'; Soler (penalty missed) 34'	Report	Gonzalo (yellow card) 3'; Barragán (yellow card) 33'; Morente (yellow card) 42'; Marcone (yellow card) 48'; González (yellow card) 65'; Rigoni (yellow card) 74'; Rodríguez (yellow card) 90+1'	Stadium: Mestalla; Attendance: 0 Referee: Pablo González Fuertes

7 February 2021 22	Athletic Bilbao	1–1	Valencia	Bilbao
16:15 CET (UTC+1)	Guillamón 43' (o.g.); Berenguer (yellow card) 51'; Martínez (yellow card) 74'	Report	Gabriel 65'; Soler (yellow card) 79'	Stadium: San Mamés; Attendance: 0 Referee: José Luis Munuera Montero

14 February 2021 23	Real Madrid	2–0	Valencia	Madrid
16:15 CET (UTC+1)	Benzema 12'; Kroos 42'	Report	Guedes (yellow card) 27'; Račić (yellow card) 44'; Correia (yellow card) 46'	Stadium: Alfredo Di Stéfano; Attendance: 0 Referee: José María Sánchez Martínez

20 February 2021 24	Valencia	2–0	Celta Vigo	Valencia
18:30 CET (UTC+1)	Lee Kang-in (yellow card) 55'; Gayà (yellow card) 62'; Vallejo 90+4'; Gameiro 90+8'	Report	Nolito (yellow card) 14'; Mina (yellow card) 31'; Tapia (yellow card) 53'; Blanco (red card) 64'	Stadium: Mestalla; Attendance: 0 Referee: Valentín Pizarro Gómez

27 February 2021 25	Getafe	3–0	Valencia	Getafe
21:00 CET (UTC+1)	Ünal (yellow card) 13'; Djené (yellow card) 29'; Cabaco (yellow card) 31'; Arambarri 39'; Mata 55'; Cucurella (yellow card) 57'; Nyom (yellow card) 76'; Aleñá 87'	Report	Correia (yellow card) 6'; Diakhaby (red card) 51'; Gayà (yellow card) 76'	Stadium: Coliseum Alfonso Pérez; Attendance: 0 Referee: Jorge Figueroa Vázquez

5 March 2021 26	Valencia	2–1	Villarreal	Valencia
21:00 CET (UTC+1)	Račić (yellow card) 14'; Soler (yellow card) 23', (goal) 86' (pen.); Gayà (yellow card) 39'; Gómez (yellow card) 67'; Guedes 90+1'	Report	Foyth (yellow card) 36'; Gerard 40' (pen.); Capoue (yellow card) 42'; Albiol (yellow card) 85'	Stadium: Mestalla; Attendance: 0 Referee: Xavier Estrada Fernández

12 March 2021 27	Levante	1–0	Valencia	Valencia
21:00 CET (UTC+1)	Vezo (yellow card) 4'; Roger 18'; Bardhi (yellow card) 39'; Vukčević (yellow card) 75'	Report	Jason (yellow card) 31'; Lato (yellow card) 34'; Diakhaby (yellow card) 61'; Vallejo (yellow card) 88'	Stadium: Ciutat de València; Attendance: 0 Referee: Guillermo Cuadra Fernández

21 March 2021 28	Valencia	2–1	Granada	Valencia
16:15 CET (UTC+1)	Wass 4'; Blanco 66'	Report	Germán (yellow card) 33'; Quini (yellow card) 67'; Soldado 90'; Montoro (yellow card) 90+5'	Stadium: Mestalla; Attendance: 0 Referee: Javier Alberola Rojas

4 April 2021 29	Cádiz	2–1	Valencia	Cádiz
18:30 CEST (UTC+2)	Cala 14', (yellow card) 26'; Salvi (yellow card) 23'; Marcos Mauro 88'	Report	Gameiro 19'; Diakhaby (yellow card) 30'; Gabriel (yellow card) 49'	Stadium: Ramón de Carranza; Attendance: 0 Referee: David Medié Jiménez

11 April 2021 30	Valencia	2–2	Real Sociedad	Valencia
16:15 CEST (UTC+2)	Soler (penalty missed) 29'; Cheryshev (yellow card) 42'; Gabriel (yellow card) 47', (goal) 73'; Wass 60' (pen.), (yellow card) 77'; Musah (yellow card) 68'; Gómez (yellow card) 78' (yellow-red card) 80'	Report	De Zárate (yellow card) 7'; Guevara 33'; Portu (yellow card) 45'; Isak 45', (yellow card) 82'; Fernández (yellow card) 58'; Monreal (yellow card) 66'	Stadium: Mestalla; Attendance: 0 Referee: Valentín Pizarro Gómez

18 April 2021 33	Real Betis	2–2	Valencia	Seville
18:30 CEST (UTC+2)	Fekir 12'; Canales 42'; Miranda (yellow card) 74'; Lainez (yellow card) 80'; Ruiz (yellow card) 84'	Report	Guedes 22'; Soler 61' (pen.); Wass (yellow card) 90+3'	Stadium: Benito Villamarín; Attendance: 0 Referee: Javier Alberola Rojas
Note: The match was originally scheduled for 28 April 2021, but was brought forward by La Liga.

21 April 2021 31	Osasuna	3–1	Valencia	Pamplona
19:00 CEST (UTC+2)	Martínez 13'; Calleri 32'; Oier (yellow card) 47'; Torres (penalty missed) 65', 67' (pen.)	Report	Guedes (yellow card) 28'; Gameiro 30'; Diakhaby (yellow card) 66'	Stadium: El Sadar; Attendance: 0 Referee: Mario Melero López

24 April 2021 32	Valencia	1–1	Alavés	Valencia
18:30 CEST (UTC+2)	Gayà (yellow card) 4', (goal) 89'; Guillamón (yellow card) 37'; Vallejo (yellow card) 81'; Soler (yellow card) 83'	Report	Guidetti 84'; López (red card) 87'	Stadium: Mestalla; Attendance: 0 Referee: Guillermo Cuadra Fernández

2 May 2021 34	Valencia	2–3	Barcelona	Valencia
21:00 CEST (UTC+2)	Račić (yellow card) 35'; Gabriel 50'; Lato (yellow card) 56'; Soler 83'	Report	Messi (penalty missed) 57', 57', 69'; Griezmann 63'; Ter Stegen (yellow card) 65'	Stadium: Mestalla; Attendance: 0 Referee: José María Sánchez Martínez

9 May 2021 35	Valencia	3–0	Valladolid	Valencia
16:15 CEST (UTC+2)	Gómez 45+1', 48'; Correia 89'	Report		Stadium: Mestalla; Attendance: 0 Referee: Jesús Gil Manzano

12 May 2021 36	Sevilla	1–0	Valencia	Seville
19:00 CEST (UTC+2)	Escudero (yellow card) 7'; Gudelj (yellow card) 37'; En-Nesyri 66'	Report	Soler (yellow card) 80'; Gabriel (yellow card) 90+3'	Stadium: Ramón Sánchez Pizjuán; Attendance: 0 Referee: Xavier Estrada Fernández

16 May 2021 37	Valencia	4–1	Eibar	Valencia
18:30 CEST (UTC+2)	Guedes 3', 49'; Soler 19', 30'	Report	Gil 39'	Stadium: Mestalla; Attendance: 0 Referee: Valentín Pizarro Gómez

22 May 2021 38	Huesca	0–0	Valencia	Huesca
18:00 CEST (UTC+2)	Ferreiro (yellow card) 34'; Siovas (yellow card) 55'	Report	Guillamón (yellow card) 20'	Stadium: El Alcoraz; Attendance: 0 Referee: Guillermo Cuadra Fernández

=== Copa del Rey ===
16 December 2020 First round	Terrassa	2–4 (a.e.t.)	Valencia	Terrassa
19:00 CET (UTC+1)	Pascual 9'; Lledó (yellow card) 39'; Fernández 50'; Lucas (red card) 89'	Report	Molina (yellow card) 21' (yellow-red card) 53'; Soler 83' (pen.); Musah 90+1'; Guedes 103', 108'	Stadium: Olímpic; Referee: Guillermo Cuadra Fernández

7 January 2021 Second round	Yeclano	1–4	Valencia	Yecla
19:00 CET (UTC+1)	Vaquero (yellow card) 8'; Oca 46', (yellow card) 72'; Castillo (yellow card) 52'	Report	Lee Kang-in 7'; Račić 9'; Sobrino 34'; Correia 53', (yellow card) 87'	Stadium: La Constitución; Referee: Ricardo De Burgos Bengoetxea

17 January 2021 Round of 32	Alcorcón	0–2	Valencia	Las Rozas (Note: Given the impossibility of being able to play the match at the Santo Domingo stadium in Alcorcón due to the consequences of the “Filomena” storm.)
18:00 CET (UTC+1)	Reko (yellow card) 35'; Bravo (yellow card) 43'; Sosa (yellow card) 46'	Report	Guillamón (yellow card) 2'; Koindredi 12'; Correia (yellow card) 46'; Vallejo 77'	Stadium: La Ciudad del Fútbol; Referee: Xavier Estrada Fernández

27 January 2021 Round of 16	Sevilla	3–0	Valencia	Seville
19:00 CET (UTC+1)	De Jong 20', 33'; Rakitić 38'; Acuña (yellow card) 62'; Vidal (yellow card) 80'; Munir (yellow card) 90+2'	Report		Stadium: Ramón Sánchez Pizjuán; Referee: Carlos del Cerro Grande

== Statistics ==
=== Appearances and goals ===
Last updated 22 May 2021

No.	Pos	Nat	Player	Total		La Liga		Copa del Rey	
No.	Pos	Nat	Player	Apps	Goals	Apps	Goals	Apps	Goals
Goalkeepers
1	GK	(Spain) ESP	Jaume Doménech	28	0	28	0	0	0
13	GK	(Netherlands) NED	Jasper Cillessen	10	0	10	0	0	0
25	GK	(Spain) ESP	Cristian Rivero	4	0	0	0	4	0
Defenders
2	DF	(Portugal) POR	Thierry Correia	32	2	25+4	1	3	1
3	DF	(Spain) ESP	Toni Lato	18	1	8+7	1	3	0
4	DF	(France) FRA	Eliaquim Mangala	9	0	4+2	0	3	0
5	DF	(Brazil) BRA	Gabriel	32	4	31	4	1	0
6	DF	(Portugal) POR	Ferro	3	0	2+1	0	0	0
12	DF	(France) FRA	Mouctar Diakhaby	27	1	24+2	1	0+1	0
14	DF	(Spain) ESP	José Luis Gayà	34	1	32+1	1	0+1	0
15	DF	(Spain) ESP	Hugo Guillamón	26	1	21+4	1	1	0
24	DF	(Italy) ITA	Cristiano Piccini	2	0	0+2	0	0	0
29	DF	(Argentina) ARG	Kevin Sibille	1	0	0	0	1	0
31	DF	(Spain) ESP	Guillem Molina	5	0	1+1	0	1+2	0
32	DF	(Spain) ESP	Jesús Vázquez	1	0	0	0	1	0
Midfielders
8	MF	(Spain) ESP	Carlos Soler	34	12	31+1	11	0+2	1
10	MF	(Uruguay) URU	Christian Oliva	9	0	1+8	0	0	0
17	MF	(Russia) RUS	Denis Cheryshev	22	0	13+8	0	1	0
18	MF	(Denmark) DEN	Daniel Wass	36	4	35	4	1	0
19	MF	(Serbia) SRB	Uroš Račić	35	2	25+6	1	3+1	1
20	MF	(South Korea) KOR	Lee Kang-in	27	1	15+9	0	2+1	1
23	MF	(Spain) ESP	Jason	21	0	4+13	0	2+2	0
26	MF	(Spain) ESP	Vicente Esquerdo	7	0	3+1	0	1+2	0
27	MF	(France) FRA	Koba Koindredi	6	1	0+2	0	4	1
30	MF	(United States) USA	Yunus Musah	34	2	17+14	1	1+2	1
Forwards
7	FW	(Portugal) POR	Gonçalo Guedes	34	7	27+4	5	2+1	2
9	FW	(France) FRA	Kevin Gameiro	26	4	10+16	4	0	0
11	FW	(Italy) ITA	Patrick Cutrone	7	0	0+7	0	0	0
16	FW	(Spain) ESP	Álex Blanco	16	1	6+7	1	1+2	0
21	FW	(Spain) ESP	Manu Vallejo	32	6	9+20	5	3	1
22	FW	(Uruguay) URU	Maxi Gómez	31	7	31	7	0	0
Players who have made an appearance or had a squad number this season but have been loaned out or transferred
6	MF	(Central African Republic) CAF	Geoffrey Kondogbia	5	0	5	0	0	0
11	FW	(Spain) ESP	Rubén Sobrino	9	1	0+5	0	4	1

=== Goalscorers ===
As of 17 May 2021

Rank	No.	Pos.	Nat.	Name	La Liga	Copa del Rey	Total
1	8	MF	(Spain)	Carlos Soler	11	1	12
2	22	FW	(Uruguay)	Maxi Gómez	7	0	7
2	7	FW	(Portugal)	Gonçalo Guedes	5	2	7
4	15	FW	(Spain)	Manu Vallejo	5	1	6
5	9	FW	(France)	Kevin Gameiro	4	0	4
5	18	MF	(Denmark)	Daniel Wass	4	0	4
5	5	DF	(Brazil)	Gabriel Paulista	4	0	4
8	19	MF	(Serbia)	Uroš Račić	1	1	2
8	30	MF	(United States)	Yunus Musah	1	1	2
8	2	DF	(Portugal)	Thierry Correia	1	1	2
11	3	DF	(Spain)	Toni Lato	1	0	1
11	11	FW	(Spain)	Rubén Sobrino	0	1	1
11	12	DF	(France)	Mouctar Diakhaby	1	0	1
11	14	DF	(Spain)	José Gayà	1	0	1
11	15	DF	(Spain)	Hugo Guillamón	1	0	1
11	16	MF	(Spain)	Álex Blanco	1	0	1
11	20	MF	(South Korea)	Lee Kang-in	0	1	1
11	27	MF	(France)	Koba Koindredi	0	1	1
Own goals					2	0	2
Totals					50	10	60
