= Carlos Soler =

Spanish footballer (born 1997)

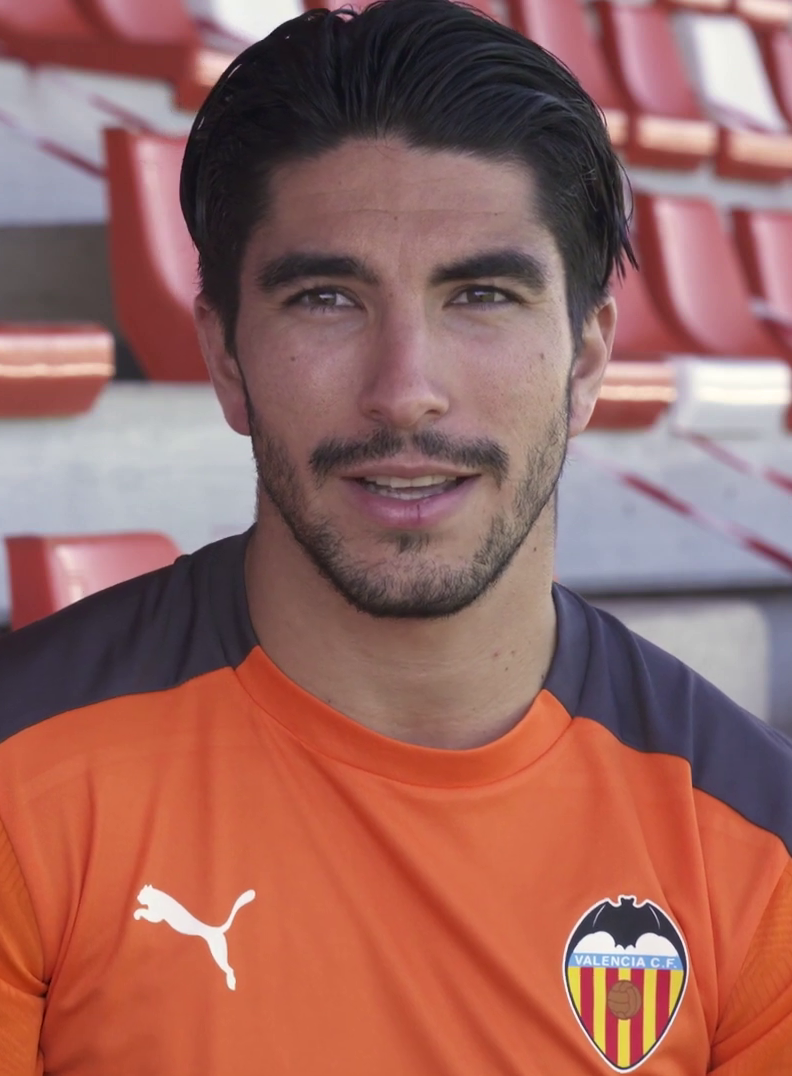
- Soler with Valencia in 2020

Personal information
- Full name: Carlos Soler Barragán
- Date of birth: 2 January 1997 (age 29)
- Place of birth: Valencia, Spain
- Height: 1.80 m (5 ft 11 in)
- Position: Midfielder

Team information
- Current team: Real Sociedad
- Number: 18

Youth career
- 2001–2005: Bonrepòs
- 2005–2015: Valencia

Senior career*
| Years | Team | Apps | (Gls) |
| 2015–2016 | Valencia B | 39 | (3) |
| 2016–2022 | Valencia | 182 | (31) |
| 2022–2025 | Paris Saint-Germain | 50 | (5) |
| 2024–2025 | → West Ham United (loan) | 31 | (1) |
| 2025– | Real Sociedad | 45 | (5) |

International career^{‡}
| 2016 | Spain U19 | 3 | (0) |
| 2017–2019 | Spain U21 | 20 | (4) |
| 2021 | Spain Olympic | 7 | (1) |
| 2021– | Spain | 15 | (4) |
Medal record
Men's football
Representing Spain
Olympic Games
| Silver medal – second place | Tokyo 2020 | Team |
UEFA European Under-21 Championship
| Winner | 2019 Italy | Team |
| Runner-up | 2017 Poland | Team |
- * Club domestic league appearances and goals as of 23:00, 22 November 2026 (UTC) ‡ National team caps and goals as of 23:05, 31 March 2026 (UTC)

Carlos Soler Barragán (born 2 January 1997) is a Spanish professional footballer who plays as a midfielder for La Liga club Real Sociedad and the Spain national team.

Soler began his professional career at Valencia, making 226 appearances, scoring 36 goals and winning the Copa del Rey in 2019. He joined Paris Saint-Germain in 2022 for an €18 million fee, and won Ligue 1 in his first two seasons. After a loan to West Ham United in the Premier League for 2024–25, he joined Real Sociedad, where he won the Copa del Rey again in 2026.

Internationally, Soler won a silver medal with the Spanish Olympic team in the 2020 tournament. He made his senior debut in 2021 and was chosen for the 2022 FIFA World Cup.

== Club career ==
=== Early career ===
Born in Valencia, Soler was first introduced to football by taking shots at half-time at the age of four during games for Bonrepòs, his brother's team. Impressed by his power, the club wanted him; he was initially too shy and wanted to joined when his grandfather gave him a Game Boy for attending. He joined hometown club Valencia's youth setup four years later in 2005, initially as a prolific striker, but later being pushed back to be an attacking midfielder and then a central midfielder.

=== Valencia ===
Soler had his senior debut the reserves on 3 May 2015, starting in a 1–0 Segunda División B away loss against Cornellà. He scored his first senior goal on 13 December, netting his team's second in a 2–2 draw at Badalona. The following 12 March he renewed his contract for two more years with the option of as many more, and was an unused substitute in the main squad's 2–1 home win against Athletic Bilbao for the season's UEFA Europa League.

On 10 December 2016 Soler made his first team – and La Liga – debut, replacing Mario Suárez in a 3–2 loss against Real Sociedad at the Anoeta Stadium. He scored his first goal in the category the following 21 January, netting the first in a 2–0 Valencian Community derby win against Villarreal at the Estadio de la Cerámica. He was sent off on 4 February in a 4–0 loss to Eibar at the Mestalla Stadium for a tussle with Gonzalo Escalante during a corner kick routine, conceding a penalty.

In January 2018, Soler signed his third new contract with Valencia in little over a year, tying him to the club until 2021 and increasing his release clause to €80 million. He totalled 51 appearances in 2018–19, including 13 in his debut European season in the UEFA Champions League and Europa League; he scored in group-stage wins over Young Boys and Manchester United in the former. He played seven games in the season's Copa del Rey as Valencia won their first honour in 11 years, and assisted Rodrigo's winner in the 2–1 final victory over Barcelona on 25 May 2019.

On 17 December 2019, Soler signed a four-year contract extension, keeping him at the club until 2023, with his release clause set at €150 million. The following 8 November, he scored the first hat-trick of his career in a 4–1 league win over Real Madrid, with all three goals coming from penalties; only two La Liga players had ever scored such a treble before. He finished 2020–21 as Valencia's top scorer with 12 goals, all bar one in the league season and seven from the spot.

In 2021–22, Soler was again Valencia's league top scorer with 11, joint with Gonçalo Guedes. In the Copa del Rey, he played six games and scored the opener in a 2–1 win at Cartagena in the last 32 on 5 January; he featured for all 120 minutes of the final against Real Betis and scored the first attempt in a penalty shootout that his team lost.

=== Paris Saint-Germain ===
On 1 September 2022, Soler signed for Ligue 1 club Paris Saint-Germain (PSG) on a five-year contract. The initial transfer fee was €18 million, potentially rising by €3 million. He made his debut five days later as a late-match substitute in a 2–1 Champions League home win over Juventus, and on 18 September he played his first league game off the bench in a 1–0 win at Lyon.

Soler scored his first goal for PSG on 25 October 2022, concluding a 7–2 Champions League win against Maccabi Haifa at the Parc des Princes. He went on to start in the final group stage match against Juventus, a 2–1 victory; however, PSG lost out on top spot to Benfica. On 29 October, he scored his first Ligue 1 goal to open PSG's account in a 4–3 home win over Troyes, while also winning a penalty that Kylian Mbappé scored. He finished his first season as a Ligue 1 champion.

During the 2023–24 season, Soler was often a substitute under compatriot manager Luis Enrique, who had played him fairly regularly in the Spain national team.

==== Loan to West Ham United ====
On 30 August 2024, Soler joined Premier League club West Ham United on loan for the 2024–25 season. He made 33 appearances over all competitions, and scored his only goal for West Ham on 14 January 2025 by opening a 3–2 victory against Fulham at the London Stadium.

=== Real Sociedad ===
On 1 September 2025, Soler returned to La Liga, signing for Real Sociedad on a four-year contract with an option for a fifth year. The transfer fee was around €7.5 million, for 50% of his economic rights. On 18 April 2026, in the Copa del Rey final, he scored his club's first attempt in a penalty shootout win over Atlético Madrid after a 2–2 draw.

== International career ==
Soler was part of the Spanish Olympic team that took part in the delayed 2020 tournament in Japan, finishing with a silver medal. Later in August 2021, he was called up to the senior team for matches against Sweden, Georgia and Kosovo. He made his debut on 2 September away to the Swedes, scoring a volley after four minutes in a 2–1 loss, and three days later he netted again in a 4–0 win over Georgia in Badajoz.

Luis Enrique called Soler up for the 2022 FIFA World Cup in Qatar. On 23 November, in Spain's opener against Costa Rica, he came on for Pedri after 57 minutes and scored in a 7–0 victory. In the last 16 against Morocco, he came off the bench in a goalless draw before having his attempt saved by Yassine Bounou in a penalty shootout defeat.

After the 2022 World Cup, Soler was not called back to the national team until March 2026, for a friendly against Egypt at the RCDE Stadium. He was substituted at half time in the goalless draw on 31 March.

== Personal life ==
Soler started a degree in sports journalism, which he did not finish. He regularly watched the Premier League on Canal+ as a child and learned the English language.

== Career statistics ==
=== Club ===
As of match played 22 November 2026

Appearances and goals by club, season and competition
| Club | Season | League | | | National cup (Note: Includes Copa del Rey, Coupe de France, FA Cup) | | League cup (Note: Includes EFL Cup) | | Europe | | Other | | Total | |
| Club | Season | Division | Apps | Goals | Apps | Goals | Apps | Goals | Apps | Goals | Apps | Goals | Apps | Goals |
|---|---|---|---|---|---|---|---|---|---|---|---|---|---|---|
| Valencia B | 2014–15 | Segunda División B | 2 | 0 | — | | — | | — | | — | | 2 | 0 |
| Valencia B | 2015–16 | Segunda División B | 28 | 2 | — | | — | | — | | — | | 28 | 2 |
| Valencia B | 2016–17 | Segunda División B | 9 | 1 | — | | — | | — | | — | | 9 | 1 |
| Valencia B | Total | | 39 | 3 | — | | — | | — | | — | | 39 | 3 |
| Valencia | 2016–17 | La Liga | 23 | 3 | 3 | 0 | — | | — | | — | | 26 | 3 |
| Valencia | 2017–18 | La Liga | 33 | 1 | 4 | 0 | — | | — | | — | | 37 | 1 |
| Valencia | 2018–19 | La Liga | 31 | 2 | 7 | 0 | — | | 13 (Note: Six appearances and two goals in UEFA Champions League, seven appearances in UEFA Europa League) | 2 | — | | 51 | 4 |
| Valencia | 2019–20 | La Liga | 28 | 2 | 3 | 0 | — | | 5 (Note: Appearances in UEFA Champions League) | 1 | 1 (Note: Appearance in Supercopa de España) | 0 | 37 | 3 |
| Valencia | 2020–21 | La Liga | 32 | 11 | 2 | 1 | — | | — | | — | | 34 | 12 |
| Valencia | 2021–22 | La Liga | 32 | 11 | 6 | 1 | — | | — | | — | | 38 | 12 |
| Valencia | 2022–23 | La Liga | 3 | 1 | — | | — | | — | | — | | 3 | 1 |
| Valencia | Total | | 182 | 31 | 25 | 2 | — | | 18 | 3 | 1 | 0 | 226 | 36 |
| Paris Saint-Germain | 2022–23 | Ligue 1 | 26 | 3 | 3 | 2 | — | | 6 | 1 | — | | 35 | 6 |
| Paris Saint-Germain | 2023–24 | Ligue 1 | 24 | 2 | 2 | 0 | — | | 2 | 0 | 0 | 0 | 28 | 2 |
| Paris Saint-Germain | Total | | 50 | 5 | 5 | 2 | — | | 8 | 1 | 0 | 0 | 63 | 8 |
| West Ham United (loan) | 2024–25 | Premier League | 31 | 1 | 1 | 0 | 1 | 0 | — | | — | | 33 | 1 |
| Real Sociedad | 2025–26 | La Liga | 33 | 4 | 7 | 0 | — | | — | | — | | 40 | 4 |
| Real Sociedad | 2026–27 | La Liga | 12 | 1 | 0 | 0 | — | | 1 (Note: Appearance in UEFA Europa League) | 0 | 0 | 0 | 13 | 1 |
| Real Sociedad | Total | | 45 | 5 | 7 | 0 | — | | 1 | 0 | 0 | 0 | 53 | 5 |
| Career total | | | 347 | 45 | 38 | 4 | 1 | 0 | 27 | 4 | 1 | 0 | 414 | 53 |

=== International ===
As of match played 31 March 2026

Appearances and goals by national team and year
| National team | Year | Apps | Goals |
|---|---|---|---|
| Spain | 2021 | 4 | 2 |
| Spain | 2022 | 10 | 2 |
| Spain | 2023 | 0 | 0 |
| Spain | 2024 | 0 | 0 |
| Spain | 2025 | 0 | 0 |
| Spain | 2026 | 1 | 0 |
| Total | | 15 | 4 |

Scores and results list Spain's goal tally first, score column indicates score after each Soler goal.

List of international goals scored by Carlos Soler
| No. | Date | Venue | Cap | Opponent | Score | Result | Competition |
|---|---|---|---|---|---|---|---|
| 1 | 2 September 2021 | Friends Arena, Solna, Sweden | 1 | Sweden | 1–0 | 1–2 | 2022 FIFA World Cup qualification |
| 2 | 5 September 2021 | Nuevo Vivero, Badajoz, Spain | 2 | Georgia | 2–0 | 4–0 | 2022 FIFA World Cup qualification |
| 3 | 12 June 2022 | La Rosaleda, Málaga, Spain | 9 | Czech Republic | 1–0 | 2–0 | 2022–23 UEFA Nations League A |
| 4 | 23 November 2022 | Al Thumama Stadium, Doha, Qatar | 13 | Costa Rica | 6–0 | 7–0 | 2022 FIFA World Cup |

== Honours ==
Valencia

- Copa del Rey: 2018–19

Paris Saint-Germain

- Ligue 1: 2022–23, 2023–24
- Coupe de France: 2023–24
- Trophée des Champions: 2023

Real Sociedad

- Copa del Rey: 2025–26

Spain U21

- UEFA European Under-21 Championship: 2019; runner-up: 2017

Spain U23

- Summer Olympic silver medal: 2020
