= Gabriel Paulista =

Brazilian footballer (born 1990)

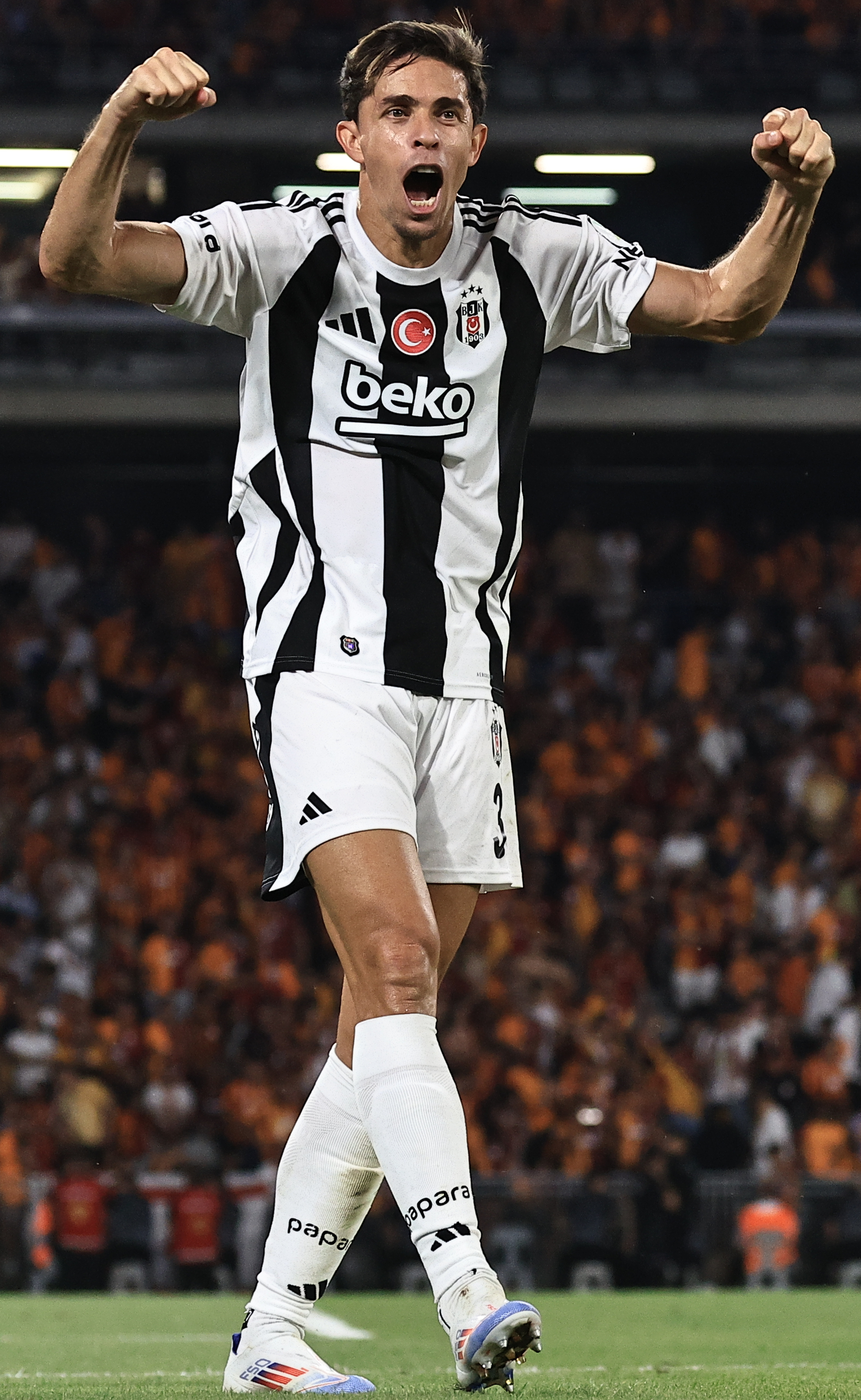
- Gabriel with Beşiktaş in 2024

Personal information
- Full name: Gabriel Armando de Abreu
- Date of birth: 26 November 1990 (age 35)
- Place of birth: São Paulo, Brazil
- Height: 1.87 m (6 ft 2 in)
- Position: Centre-back

Team information
- Current team: Corinthians
- Number: 3

Youth career
- 2009: Taboão da Serra
- 2009–2010: Vitória

Senior career*
Years	Team	Apps	(Gls)
2010–2013	Vitória	115	(6)
2013–2015	Villarreal	37	(0)
2015–2017	Arsenal	46	(1)
2017–2024	Valencia	182	(8)
2024	Atlético Madrid	5	(0)
2024–2026	Beşiktaş	30	(1)
2026–	Corinthians	29	(1)
- * Club domestic league appearances and goals as of 19 October 2026 (UTC)

Gabriel Armando de Abreu (born 26 November 1990), commonly known as Gabriel Paulista (Brazilian Portuguese: [ɡabɾiˈew pawˈlistɐ]) or simply Gabriel, is a Brazilian professional footballer who plays as a centre-back for Campeonato Brasileiro Série A club Corinthians.

He began his career with Vitória in 2010, winning two Campeonato Baiano titles and finishing as runner-up in the 2010 Copa do Brasil. He also spent a season-and-a-half in Spain's top flight with Villarreal before joining Arsenal in January 2015. Having won two FA Cups, he moved to Valencia in August 2017. He made over 200 appearances for Valencia, winning the Copa del Rey in 2019.

== Club career ==
=== Vitória ===
Born in São Paulo, Gabriel Paulista joined Vitória's youth setup in 2009 from Taboão da Serra, after having failed trials at Grêmio Barueri and Santos. He made his senior debut for the former on 7 March 2010, starting in a 3–1 win at Camaçari for the Campeonato Baiano championship, his only appearance in a season in which Vitória won the state title. He made his Série A debut on 15 May, replacing Vilson in a 1–1 home draw against Flamengo.

In August 2010, Gabriel Paulista appeared in both matches of 2010 Copa do Brasil finals against Santos, but playing as a right back in a 3–2 aggregate loss. On 5 December, in the last game of a league season which saw his team relegated, Gabriel was sent off for a foul on Anaílson in a goalless home draw against Atlético Goianiense.

He made his first team breakthrough in late 2011, and went on to play a crucial role in the following year, appearing in 35 matches as Leão returned to Série A. On 6 September 2012 Gabriel Paulista signed a contract extension with Vitória, until 2016.

He was elected the best central defender of 2013 Campeonato Baiano; he opened in a 7–3 win at city rivals Bahia on 12 May, in the first leg of the final (8–4 aggregate). On 25 May, in the opening game of the 2013 season, he scored his only goal in the national league, putting Vitória 2–0 up after 12 minutes against Internacional at the Arena Fonte Nova, an eventual 2–2 draw.

=== Villarreal ===
On 15 August 2013, Gabriel Paulista moved to La Liga outfit Villarreal, signing a five-year deal with the club. He made his debut in the competition on 10 November, starting in a 1–1 home draw against Atlético Madrid.

Gabriel Paulista featured in 18 league matches during his first season abroad, sharing terms with Chechu Dorado, as the Yellow Submarine finished sixth and subsequently returned to a European competition. He made his UEFA Europa League debut on 21 August 2014, starting in a 3–0 away win against FC Astana.

Profiting from Mateo Musacchio's injury, Gabriel Paulista also overtook Dorado and was made a starter in 2014–15. He formed a strong partnership with new signing Víctor Ruiz, with his side conceding only 17 goals in the 19 league matches in which he appeared.

=== Arsenal ===
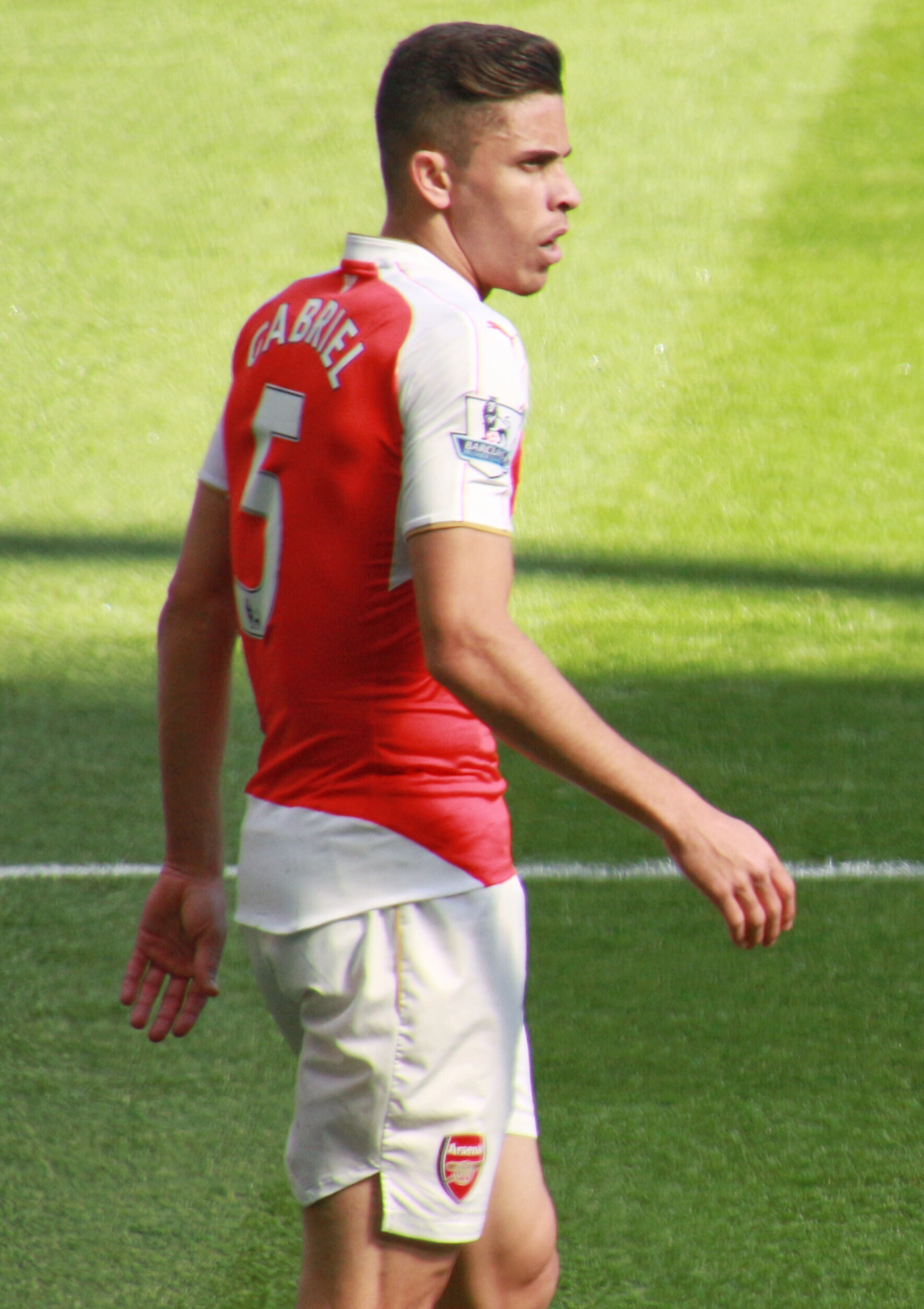
Gabriel playing for Arsenal in 2015

On 26 January 2015, Gabriel Paulista was granted a work permit by the UK government and expected to join Arsenal for a fee of around £11.3 million. He signed for the club two days later, with Joel Campbell moving the other way on loan. Manager Arsène Wenger stated that despite the player's fitness, Gabriel could make errors in his first matches due to not being able to speak English.

Gabriel Paulista made his debut for Arsenal on 15 February, playing the entirety of a 2–0 home win over Middlesbrough in the fifth round of the FA Cup. He made his Premier League debut six days later, coming on for Alexis Sánchez in the final minute of a 2–1 win away to Crystal Palace.

Gabriel Paulista made his first full start in the Premier League in Arsenal's 2–0 home win over Everton on 1 March. He experienced a shaky start to the game but later executed a perfect sliding tackle on the goal-bound Romelu Lukaku, cleanly winning the ball. He was an unused substitute on 30 May, as Arsenal won the FA Cup final 4–0 against Aston Villa at Wembley Stadium.

On 19 September 2015, Gabriel Paulista was sent off against Chelsea for a tussle with Diego Costa; Santi Cazorla was later dismissed as nine-man Arsenal lost 2–0. Gabriel initially received a standard three-match suspension for violent conduct after receiving a direct red card, but the decision was later withdrawn after a "wrongful dismissal claim"; he was however banned for one match and fined £10,000 for improper conduct by not leaving the pitch immediately.

On 28 December 2015, Gabriel headed in Mesut Özil's corner kick to open a 2–0 win against Bournemouth; the result put The Gunners top of the Premier League.

=== Valencia ===
On 18 August 2017, Gabriel Paulista returned to Spain to join Valencia on a five-year contract. He made his debut on 9 September, in a 0–0 home draw against Atlético Madrid. On 20 January 2018, he was sent off for dissent in a 2–1 loss at UD Las Palmas, infuriating his manager Marcelino García Toral.

Gabriel Paulista played five games as Los Che won the 2018–19 Copa del Rey, including the 2–1 final win over Barcelona on 25 May; it was their first honour for eleven years. On 10 December 2019, he was sent off at the end of a 1–0 win at Ajax in the last game of the Champions League group stage, for headbutting Dušan Tadić.

In 2020–21, Gabriel Paulista scored a career-best four goals in 31 games, starting with an equaliser in a 4–2 home win over city rivals Levante in the opening game on 13 September 2020. He signed a new contract to 2024, in January 2021.

Owing to a muscular injury in his right leg, Gabriel Paulista was sidelined from 30 October 2021 until the following 26 February, when he needed just four minutes to score the only goal away to Mallorca. He played the full 120 minutes of the 2022 Copa del Rey final on 23 April – being booked after five minutes for a foul on Borja Iglesias – as his team lost on penalties to Real Betis.

=== Atlético Madrid ===
On 31 January 2024, Gabriel Paulista joined fellow La Liga club Atlético Madrid on a free transfer, signing a contract until the end of the season.

=== Beşiktaş ===
On 15 June 2024, Gabriel Paulista joined Süper Lig club Beşiktaş on a free transfer until 2027.

== International career ==
On 20 March 2015, Gabriel Paulista was called up to the Brazil national team for the first time, replacing the injured David Luiz for friendly matches against France and Chile. However, he did not feature in either match.

On 9 December 2020, Gabriel Paulista obtained Spanish nationality through residence, and made himself available to represent the Spain national team.

== Career statistics ==
As of match played 19 October 2026

Appearances and goals by club, season and competition
Club	Season	League			State league (Note: Includes Campeonato Baiano, Campeonato Paulista)		National cup (Note: Includes Copa do Brasil, Copa del Rey, FA Cup, Turkish Cup)		League cup (Note: Includes EFL Cup)		Continental		Other		Total	
Club	Season	Division	Apps	Goals	Apps	Goals	Apps	Goals	Apps	Goals	Apps	Goals	Apps	Goals	Apps	Goals
Vitória	2010	Série A	11	0	1	0	2	0	—		8 (Note: Appearances in Copa Sudamericana)	0	—		22	0
Vitória	2011	Série B	17	0	10	0	0	0	—		—		—		27	0
Vitória	2012	Série B	35	0	17	4	5	0	—		—		—		57	4
Vitória	2013	Série A	14	1	10	1	3	0	—		—		8 (Note: Appearances in Copa do Nordeste)	1	35	3
Vitória	Total		77	1	38	5	10	0	—		8	0	8	1	141	7
Villarreal	2013–14	La Liga	18	0	—		3	0	—		—		—		21	0
Villarreal	2014–15	La Liga	19	0	—		2	0	—		8 (Note: Appearances in UEFA Europa League)	0	—		29	0
Villarreal	Total		37	0	—		5	0	—		8	0	—		50	0
Arsenal	2014–15	Premier League	6	0	—		2	0	—		—		—		8	0
Arsenal	2015–16	Premier League	21	1	—		4	0	0	0	4 (Note: Appearances in UEFA Champions League)	0	0	0	29	1
Arsenal	2016–17	Premier League	19	0	—		3	0	3	0	2	0	—		27	0
Arsenal	Total		46	1	—		9	0	3	0	6	0	0	0	64	1
Valencia	2017–18	La Liga	30	0	—		7	0	—		—		—		37	0
Valencia	2018–19	La Liga	30	0	—		5	0	—		11 (Note: Five appearances in UEFA Champions League, six appearances in UEFA Europa League)	0	—		46	0
Valencia	2019–20	La Liga	33	1	—		2	0	—		6	0	1 (Note: Appearance in Supercopa de España)	0	42	1
Valencia	2020–21	La Liga	31	4	—		1	0	—		—		—		32	4
Valencia	2021–22	La Liga	19	2	—		2	0	—		—		—		21	2
Valencia	2022–23	La Liga	21	1	—		2	0	—		—		0	0	23	1
Valencia	2023–24	La Liga	18	0	—		1	0	—		—		—		19	0
Valencia	Total		182	8	—		20	0	—		17	0	1	0	220	8
Atlético Madrid	2023–24	La Liga	5	0	—		0	0	—		0	0	—		5	0
Beşiktaş	2024–25	Süper Lig	20	1	—		1	0	—		6	0	1 (Note: Appearance in Turkish Super Cup)	0	28	1
Beşiktaş	2025–26	Süper Lig	10	0	—		1	0	—		6 (Note: Two appearances in UEFA Europa League, four appearances in UEFA Conference League)	0	—		17	0
Beşiktaş	Total		30	1	—		2	0	—		12	0	1	0	45	1
Corinthians	2026	Série A	23	1	6	0	3	0	—		10 (Note: Appearances in Copa Libertadores)	0	1 (Note: Appearance in Supercopa do Brasil)	1	43	2
Career total			400	12	44	5	49	0	3	0	61	0	11	2	568	19

== Honours ==
Vitória

- Campeonato Baiano: 2010, 2013

Arsenal

- FA Cup: 2014–15, 2016–17
- FA Community Shield: 2015

Valencia

- Copa del Rey: 2018–19

Beşiktaş

- Turkish Super Cup: 2024

Corinthians

- Supercopa do Brasil: 2026

Individual

- Campeonato Baiano Best Central Defender: 2012, 2013
- FotMob La Liga Team of The Season: 2021–22
