= Gonçalo Guedes =

Portuguese footballer (born 1996)

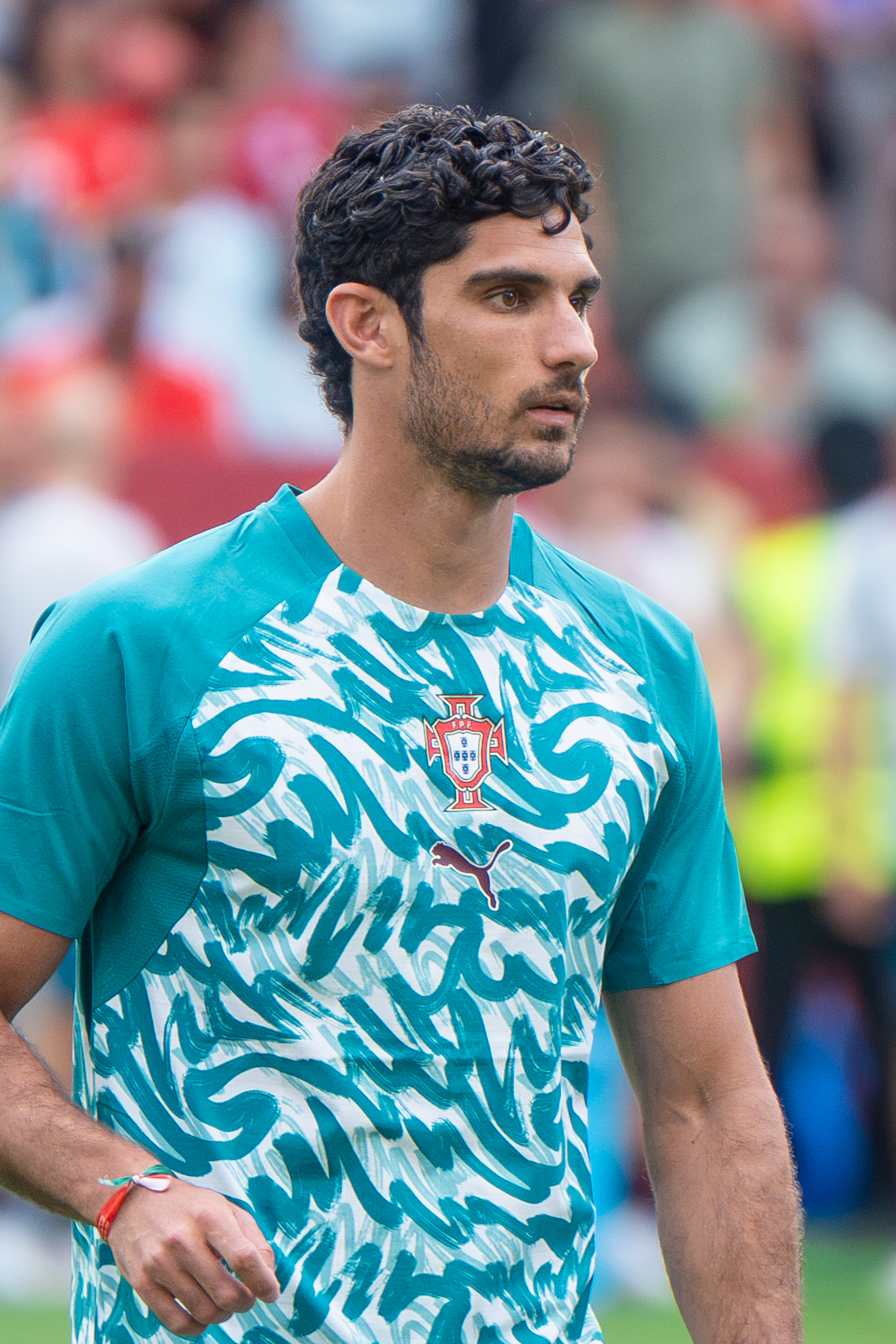
- Guedes with Portugal in 2026

Personal information
- Full name: Gonçalo Manuel Ganchinho Guedes
- Date of birth: 29 November 1996 (age 29)
- Place of birth: Benavente, Portugal
- Height: 1.79 m (5 ft 10 in)
- Positions: Winger; forward

Team information
- Current team: Real Sociedad
- Number: 11

Youth career
- 2005–2014: Benfica

Senior career*
Years	Team	Apps	(Gls)
2014–2016	Benfica B	38	(11)
2014–2017	Benfica	39	(5)
2017–2018	Paris Saint-Germain	8	(0)
2017–2018	→ Valencia (loan)	33	(5)
2018–2022	Valencia	113	(23)
2022–2025	Wolverhampton Wanderers	42	(3)
2023–2024	→ Benfica (loan)	21	(1)
2023-2024	→ Villarreal (loan)	17	(3)
2025–	Real Sociedad	44	(11)

International career^{‡}
2011	Portugal U15	1	(0)
2011–2012	Portugal U16	14	(1)
2012–2013	Portugal U17	15	(2)
2013–2014	Portugal U18	5	(3)
2014	Portugal U19	3	(2)
2015	Portugal U20	6	(0)
2015–2017	Portugal U21	12	(5)
2016	Portugal U23	1	(0)
2015–	Portugal	34	(8)
Medal record
Representing Portugal
UEFA Nations League
Winner	2019 Portugal
- * Club domestic league appearances and goals as of 23:41, 22 November 2026 (UTC) ‡ National team caps and goals as of 22:40, 6 June 2026 (UTC)

Gonçalo Manuel Ganchinho Guedes (Note: European Portuguese: [ɡõˈsalu ˈɣɛðɨʃ] In isolation, Guedes is pronounced [ˈɡɛðɨʃ]) (born 29 November 1996) is a Portuguese professional footballer who plays as a winger or forward for La Liga club Real Sociedad and the Portugal national team.

Guedes began his career at Benfica, making his professional debut for the reserves in April 2014 and the first team six months later. After 11 goals in 63 matches across all competitions, winning five major trophies, he transferred to Paris Saint-Germain for a €30 million transfer fee in January 2017. He played only 13 matches for PSG before being loaned to Valencia in September 2017, joining them on a permanent basis for a €40 million transfer fee a year later. He played 178 games and scored 36 goals for the Spanish club, winning the Copa del Rey in 2019, and signed for English Premier League side Wolverhampton Wanderers for £27.5 million in 2022.

Guedes earned 57 caps for Portugal at youth level, from under-15 to under-23. He made his senior international debut in November 2015, at age 18, and played at the 2018 FIFA World Cup. He scored the winning goal for Portugal in the 2019 UEFA Nations League final. He was also included in the squads for UEFA Euro 2020 and the 2026 FIFA World Cup.

== Club career ==
=== Benfica ===
Born in Benavente, Guedes joined S.L. Benfica's youth system in 2005, where he progressed to the juniors team. On his debut at age eight, he scored all of the goals in a 5–0 win against a team of boys three years older. He was part of Benfica's squad in the inaugural UEFA Youth League in 2013–14, contributing to their victories over Paris Saint-Germain, Anderlecht, Manchester City and Real Madrid en route to the final.

On 19 April 2014, he made his professional debut with Benfica B in a 2013–14 Segunda Liga match against Porto B, playing 21 minutes of an eventual 4–1 away loss before being replaced by Rudinilson Silva.

On 18 October 2014, Guedes debuted for Benfica's first team at Sporting da Covilhã in the third round of Taça de Portugal. On 4 January 2015, he debuted in the Primeira Liga at Penafiel as an added-time substitute for Lima in a 3–0 victory. On 4 July, he won the 2014–15 Segunda Liga's Breakthrough Player of the Year award.

On 26 September 2015, Guedes scored his first goal with Benfica in a 3–0 victory against Paços de Ferreira in the league. On 30 September, he scored his first goal in the UEFA Champions League in a victory at Atlético Madrid (2–1), and became the youngest Portuguese player to have scored a goal in the group stage. He was praised by opposing manager Diego Simeone after the match.

While mainly used as a right-winger at Benfica, he played some matches as a false 9 center-forward due to injury to striker Jonas.

=== Paris Saint-Germain ===
On 25 January 2017, Guedes joined Paris Saint-Germain for a €30 million transfer fee, signing a contract lasting until 2021. Upon signing, he said that he wanted to emulate compatriot and former PSG player Pauleta. PSG won a bidding war with Manchester United for his signature.

Guedes made his debut for the Ligue 1 title holders four days later, replacing fellow newcomer Julian Draxler for the final three minutes of a 1–1 home draw with Monaco.

=== Valencia ===
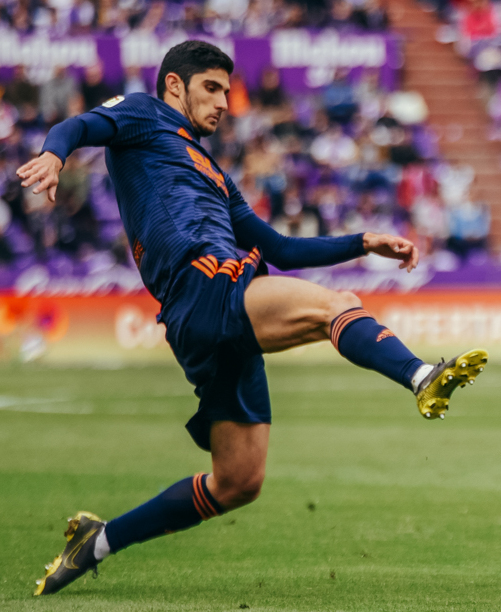
Guedes playing for Valencia in May 2019

On 1 September 2017, Guedes was loaned to Spanish club Valencia on a season-long deal. The transfer was facilitated by the contacts between his agent Jorge Mendes and the owners of Valencia.

Guedes made his La Liga debut eight days later, replacing Andreas Pereira for the final half-hour of a goalless home draw against Atlético Madrid. On 15 October, Guedes scored the first goal of his loan in a 6–3 win at Real Betis, as his unbeaten team rose to second above Real Madrid. Six days later, he scored twice and assisted Santi Mina in a 4–0 win over Sevilla, the Che team's fifth consecutive victory. He received plaudits from the international sporting press for his early-season form.

On 30 August 2018, Guedes signed permanently to Valencia on a deal running until 2024, for an initial club-record €40 million fee potentially including a further €17 million; the release clause was €300 million. From December until February 2019, he was sidelined with a pubalgia. He played in the 2019 Copa del Rey Final on 25 May, with Valencia defeating Barcelona 2–1 to win the club's first honour in 11 years.

From October 2019 until the following February, Guedes was out with a right ankle injury. On 30 December, he was sent off for swearing at the referee in a 2–1 loss at Granada. He had the most prolific season of his career in 2021–22, finishing as his team's joint top scorer alongside Carlos Soler with 11, while also playing the most games with 36 and most minutes with over 2,500; this included two goals in a 4–3 win at Levante in the Valencia derby on 20 December. In March 2022, his long-range strike against Athletic Bilbao was the decisive goal that sent his team to another Copa final.

=== Wolverhampton Wanderers ===
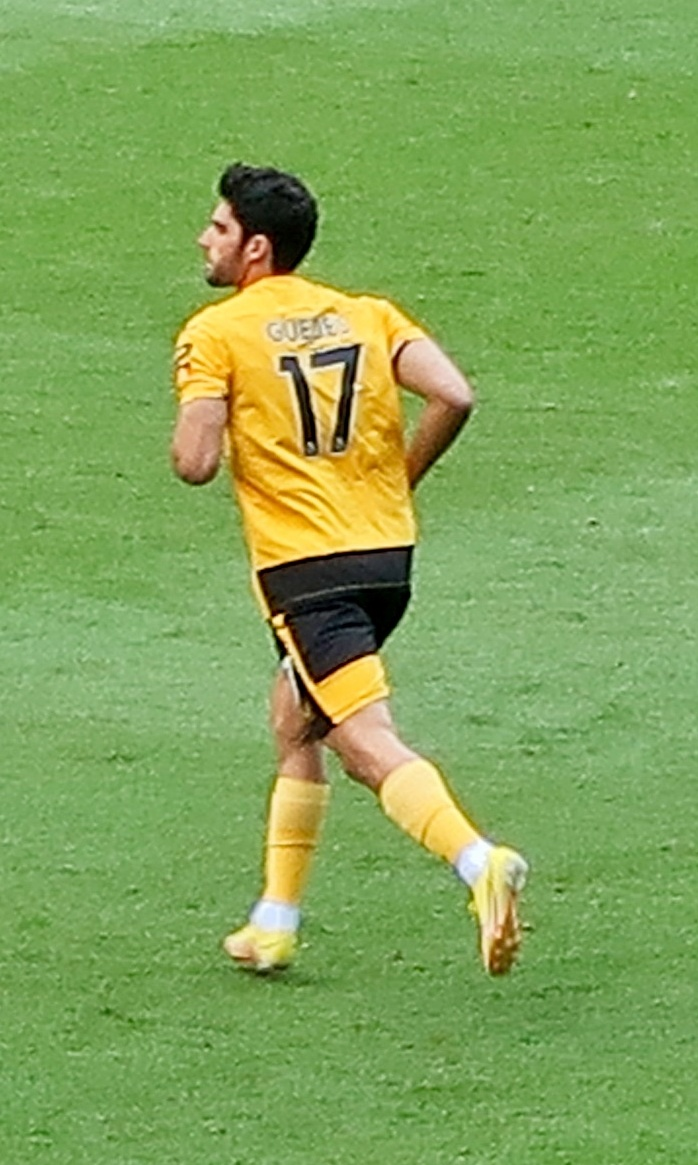
Guedes making his Wolverhampton Wanderers debut on 13 August 2022

On 8 August 2022, Premier League side Wolverhampton Wanderers signed Guedes on a five-year deal for £27.5 million. He made his debut five days later as a 58th-minute substitute for Hwang Hee-chan in a goalless draw with Fulham, and on 20 August made his first start in a 1–0 away defeat at Tottenham Hotspur.

==== Return to Benfica on loan ====
On 20 January 2023, Guedes returned to his old club Benfica on a loan for the remainder of the 2022–23 season. The following day, in a match away at Santa Clara, he came on as a substitute in the 64th minute and scored, sealing a 3–0 win.

On 25 February, in a match away at Vizela, Guedes got injured and had to undergo knee surgery, sidelining him for almost two months. However, on 21 May 2023, in a clash against rivals Sporting CP, Guedes injured the same knee, requiring him to undergo surgery once again. That season, Benfica were crowned Primeira Liga champions, and Guedes received a medal.

On 29 August 2023, Benfica announced that Guedes' loan had been extended until the end of the 2023–24 season. On 19 January 2024, Benfica and Wolverhampton Wanderers reached an agreement for the termination of Guedes' loan spell.

==== Loan to Villarreal ====
On 19 January 2024, hours after Guedes left Benfica, Wolverhampton Wanderers sent him on another loan, this time to La Liga club Villarreal, until the end of the 2023–24 season. On 20 January 2024, Guedes made his La Liga debut for the team against Mallorca. On 27 January, Guedes scored his first La Liga goal for Villarreal against Barcelona at Estadi Olímpic Lluís Companys, winning the game 5–3.

== International career ==
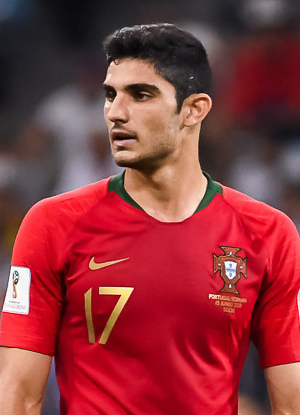
Guedes with Portugal at the 2018 FIFA World Cup

Guedes was first called-up by Portugal first-team manager Fernando Santos on 6 November 2015 ahead of international friendlies against Russia and Luxembourg. He made his debut eight days later against the former, starting in a 1–0 loss in Krasnodar, which made him the first 18-year-old to represent the nation since Cristiano Ronaldo.

On 10 November 2017, Guedes scored his first senior international goal in a 3–0 friendly win over Saudi Arabia in Viseu, also assisting Manuel Fernandes earlier in the match.

Guedes was named in Portugal's 23-man squad for the 2018 FIFA World Cup in Russia. In the final warm-up match before the tournament, he scored twice in a 3–0 win over Algeria at the Estádio da Luz.

At the 2019 UEFA Nations League Finals, hosted on home soil, Guedes was a substitute for João Félix in the semi-final victory over Switzerland but started the final at the Estádio do Dragão against the Netherlands, during which he scored the match's only goal.

In October 2022, he was named in Portugal's preliminary 55-man squad for the 2022 FIFA World Cup in Qatar.

On 19 May 2026, Guedes was selected in the 26-man squad for the 2026 FIFA World Cup.

== Career statistics ==
=== Club ===
As of match played 22 November 2026

Appearances and goals by club, season and competition
Club	Season	League			National cup (Note: Includes Taça de Portugal, Coupe de France, Copa del Rey, FA Cup)		League cup (Note: Includes Taça da Liga, EFL Cup)		Continental		Other		Total	
Club	Season	Division	Apps	Goals	Apps	Goals	Apps	Goals	Apps	Goals	Apps	Goals	Apps	Goals
Benfica B	2013–14	Segunda Liga	1	0	—		—		—		—		1	0
Benfica B	2014–15	Segunda Liga	32	8	—		—		—		—		32	8
Benfica B	2015–16	LigaPro	5	3	—		—		—		—		5	3
Benfica B	Total		38	11	—		—		—		—		38	11
Benfica	2014–15	Primeira Liga	5	0	1	0	3	0	0	0	—		9	0
Benfica	2015–16	Primeira Liga	18	3	1	0	4	0	7 (Note: Appearances in UEFA Champions League)	1	1 (Note: Appearance in Supertaça Cândido de Oliveira)	0	31	4
Benfica	2016–17	Primeira Liga	16	2	4	1	2	2	6	2	0	0	28	7
Benfica	Total		39	5	6	1	9	2	13	3	1	0	68	11
Paris Saint-Germain	2016–17	Ligue 1	7	0	4	0	0	0	—		—		11	0
Paris Saint-Germain	2017–18	Ligue 1	1	0	0	0	0	0	0	0	1 (Note: Appearance in Trophée des Champions)	0	2	0
Paris Saint-Germain	Total		8	0	4	0	0	0	0	0	1	0	13	0
Valencia (loan)	2017–18	La Liga	33	5	5	1	—		—		—		38	6
Valencia	2018–19	La Liga	25	5	2	0	—		12 (Note: Four appearances in UEFA Champions League, eight appearances and three goals in UEFA Europa League)	3	—		39	8
Valencia	2019–20	La Liga	21	2	1	0	—		3	0	0	0	25	2
Valencia	2020–21	La Liga	31	5	3	2	—		—		—		34	7
Valencia	2021–22	La Liga	36	11	6	2	—		—		—		42	13
Valencia	Valencia total		146	28	17	5	—		15	3	0	0	178	36
Wolverhampton Wanderers	2022–23	Premier League	13	1	1	1	4	0	—		—		18	2
Wolverhampton Wanderers	2024–25	Premier League	29	2	2	0	2	3	—		—		33	5
Wolverhampton Wanderers	Total		42	3	3	1	6	3	—		—		51	7
Benfica (loan)	2022–23	Primeira Liga	12	1	1	1	—		2	0	—		15	2
Benfica (loan)	2023–24	Primeira Liga	9	0	1	0	2	0	2	0	0	0	14	0
Benfica (loan)	Total		21	1	2	1	2	0	4	0	0	0	29	2
Villarreal (loan)	2023–24	La Liga	17	3	—		—		2 (Note: Appearances in UEFA Europa League)	0	—		19	3
Real Sociedad	2025–26	La Liga	32	8	7	1	—		—		—		39	9
Real Sociedad	2026–27	La Liga	12	3	0	0	—		4	0	0	0	16	3
Real Sociedad	Total		44	11	7	1	—		4	0	0	0	55	12
Career total			354	62	39	9	17	5	38	6	2	0	451	82

=== International ===
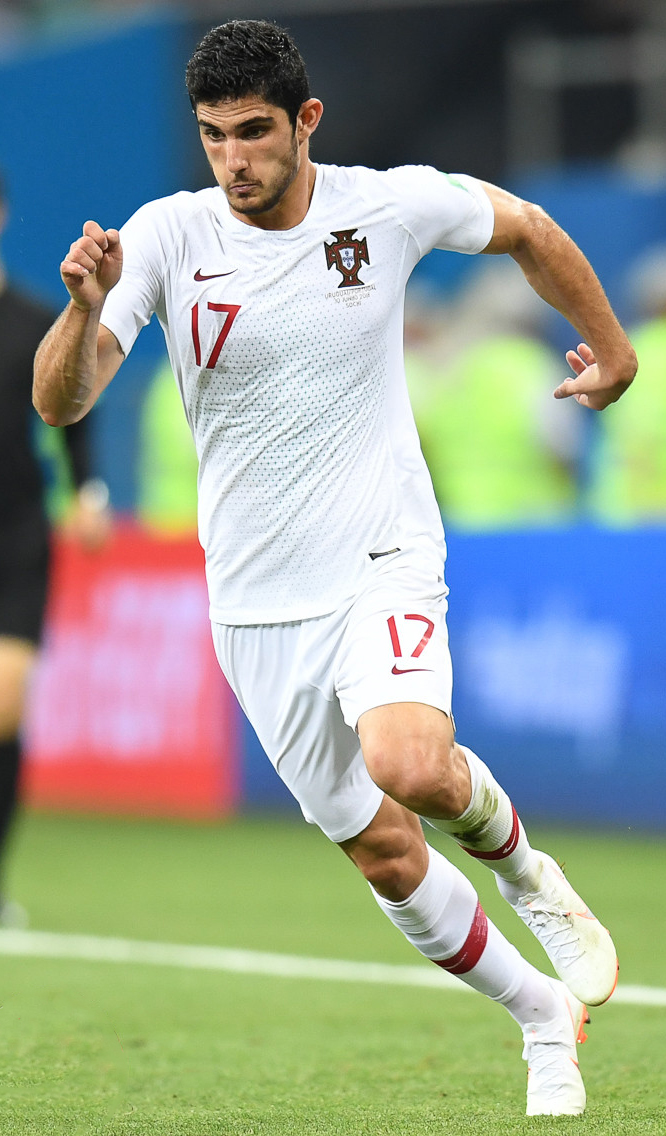
Guedes at the 2018 FIFA World Cup

As of match played 6 June 2026

Appearances and goals by national team and year
National team	Year	Apps	Goals
Portugal	2015	2	0
Portugal	2016	0	0
Portugal	2017	3	1
Portugal	2018	9	2
Portugal	2019	7	3
Portugal	2020	1	0
Portugal	2021	7	0
Portugal	2022	3	1
Portugal	2023	0	0
Portugal	2024	0	0
Portugal	2025	0	0
Portugal	2026	2	1
Total		34	8

Scores and results list Portugal's goal tally first, score column indicates score after each Guedes goal.

List of international goals scored by Gonçalo Guedes
No.	Date	Venue	Cap	Opponent	Score	Result	Competition
1	10 November 2017	Estádio do Fontelo, Viseu, Portugal	4	Saudi Arabia	2–0	3–0	Friendly
2	7 June 2018	Estadio da Luz, Lisbon, Portugal	10	Algeria	1–0	3–0	Friendly
3	7 June 2018	Estadio da Luz, Lisbon, Portugal	10	Algeria	3–0	3–0	Friendly
4	9 June 2019	Estádio do Dragão, Porto, Portugal	17	Netherlands	1–0	1–0	2019 UEFA Nations League final
5	7 September 2019	Red Star Stadium, Belgrade, Serbia	18	Serbia	2–0	4–2	UEFA Euro 2020 qualification
6	11 October 2019	Estádio José Alvalade, Lisbon, Portugal	20	Luxembourg	3–0	3–0	UEFA Euro 2020 qualification
7	9 June 2022	Estádio José Alvalade, Lisbon, Portugal	31	Czech Republic	2–0	2–0	2022–23 UEFA Nations League A
8	6 June 2026	Estádio Nacional, Oeiras, Portugal	34	Chile	1–0	2–1	Friendly

== Honours ==
Benfica

- Primeira Liga: 2014–15, 2015–16, 2016–17, 2022–23
- Taça de Portugal: 2016–17
- Taça da Liga: 2014–15, 2015–16
- Supertaça Cândido de Oliveira: 2016

Paris Saint-Germain

- Ligue 1: 2017–18
- Coupe de France: 2016–17
- Trophée des Champions: 2017

Valencia

- Copa del Rey: 2018–19

Real Sociedad

- Copa del Rey: 2025–26

Portugal

- UEFA Nations League: 2018–19

Individual

- Segunda Liga Breakthrough Player of the Year: 2014–15
- SJPF Segunda Liga Player of the Month: October 2014, December 2014
