= Vicente Esquerdo =

Spanish footballer

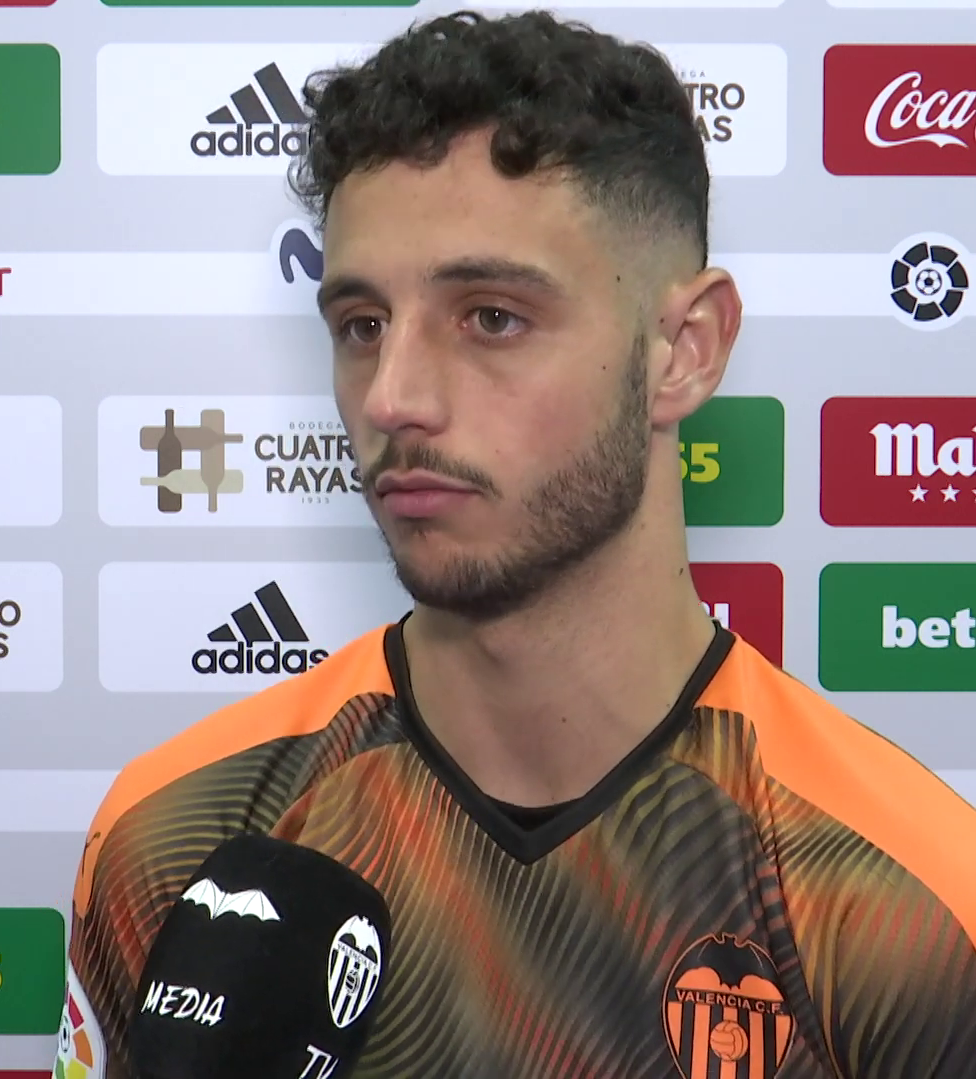
- Esquerdo being interviewed at Valencia, 2019

Personal information
- Full name: Vicente Esquerdo Santas
- Date of birth: 2 January 1999 (age 27)
- Place of birth: Calp, Spain
- Height: 1.82 m (6 ft 0 in)
- Position: Attacking midfielder

Team information
- Current team: Racing Ferrol

Youth career
- Ciudad de Benidorm
- 2014–2018: Valencia

Senior career*
| Years | Team | Apps | (Gls) |
| 2018–2023 | Valencia B | 85 | (6) |
| 2019–2023 | Valencia | 7 | (0) |
| 2021–2022 | → Castellón (loan) | 20 | (0) |
| 2023–2024 | Arenteiro | 31 | (2) |
| 2024–2026 | Ponferradina | 58 | (2) |
| 2026– | Racing Ferrol | 0 | (0) |
- * Club domestic league appearances and goals as of 25 May 2026

Vicente Esquerdo Santas (born 2 January 1999) is a Spanish professional footballer who plays as an attacking midfielder for Primera Federación club Racing Ferrol.

== Club career ==
Born in Calp, Alicante, Valencian Community, Esquerdo joined Valencia CF's youth setup from CF Ciudad de Benidorm. He made his senior debut with the reserves on 25 August 2018, coming on as a late substitute for Sito in a 2–0 Segunda División B home win against CD Ebro.

Esquerdo scored his first senior goal on 24 November 2018, netting his team's first in a 2–2 home draw against UB Conquense. He made his first team – and La Liga – debut on 30 November of the following year, replacing Francis Coquelin late into a 2-1 home defeat of Villarreal CF.

On 27 August 2021, Esquerdo was loaned to Primera División RFEF side CD Castellón for one year.

On 27 September 2023, Esquerdo signed for Primera Federación club Arenteiro.

On 5 July 2024, Esquerdo moved to Ponferradina, also in Primera Federación.

== Career statistics ==
=== Club ===
As of match played 27 May 2023

| Club | Season | League | | | Cup | | Continental | | Other | | Total | |
| Club | Season | Division | Apps | Goals | Apps | Goals | Apps | Goals | Apps | Goals | Apps | Goals |
|---|---|---|---|---|---|---|---|---|---|---|---|---|
| Valencia B | 2018–19 | Segunda División B | 28 | 1 | — | | — | | — | | 28 | 1 |
| Valencia B | 2019–20 | Segunda División B | 24 | 2 | — | | — | | — | | 24 | 2 |
| Valencia B | 2020–21 | Segunda División B | 10 | 0 | — | | — | | — | | 10 | 0 |
| Valencia B | 2022–23 | Segunda Federación | 23 | 3 | — | | — | | 2 (Note: Appearances in 2023 Segunda Federación play-offs) | 0 | 25 | 2 |
| Valencia B | Total | | 85 | 6 | — | | — | | 2 | 0 | 87 | 6 |
| Valencia | 2019–20 | La Liga | 3 | 0 | 1 | 0 | 0 | 0 | 0 | 0 | 4 | 0 |
| Valencia | 2020–21 | La Liga | 4 | 0 | 3 | 0 | — | | — | | 7 | 0 |
| Valencia | Total | | 7 | 0 | 4 | 0 | 0 | 0 | 0 | 0 | 11 | 0 |
| Castellón (loan) | 2021–22 | Primera División RFEF | 20 | 0 | 2 | 1 | — | | — | | 22 | 1 |
| Arenteiro | 2023–24 | Primera Federación | 0 | 0 | 0 | 0 | — | | 0 | 0 | 0 | 0 |
| Career total | | | 112 | 6 | 6 | 1 | 0 | 0 | 2 | 0 | 120 | 7 |
