= Uroš Račić =

Serbian footballer (born 1998)

Uroš Račić Урош Рачић
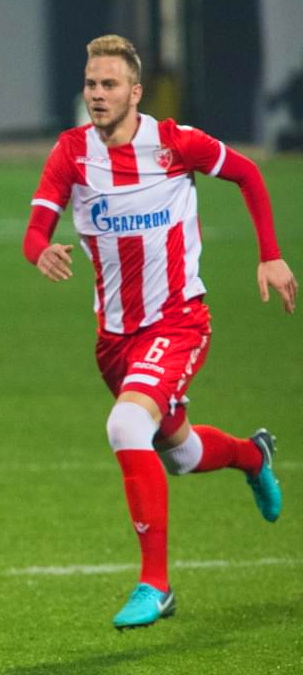
- Račić with Red Star Belgrade in 2018

Personal information
- Full name: Uroš Račić
- Date of birth: 17 March 1998 (age 28)
- Place of birth: Kraljevo, Serbia, FR Yugoslavia
- Height: 1.93 m (6 ft 4 in)
- Position: Defensive midfielder

Team information
- Current team: Aris
- Number: 10

Youth career
- Bambi Kraljevo
- ŠF Knjaz
- Altina Zemun
- Sloga Kraljevo
- Sloboda Čačak
- OFK Beograd
- 2016–2017: Red Star Belgrade

Senior career*
| Years | Team | Apps | (Gls) |
| 2016–2018 | Red Star Belgrade | 31 | (3) |
| 2018 | Valencia B | 15 | (1) |
| 2018–2023 | Valencia | 59 | (1) |
| 2019 | → Tenerife (loan) | 16 | (1) |
| 2019–2020 | → Famalicão (loan) | 33 | (3) |
| 2022–2023 | → Braga (loan) | 25 | (1) |
| 2023–2025 | Sassuolo | 22 | (1) |
| 2024 | → West Bromwich Albion (loan) | 21 | (0) |
| 2025 | → Braga (loan) | 14 | (3) |
| 2025– | Aris | 34 | (4) |

International career^{‡}
| 2016 | Serbia U18 | 4 | (1) |
| 2016−2017 | Serbia U19 | 14 | (2) |
| 2017−2020 | Serbia U21 | 14 | (0) |
| 2021– | Serbia | 13 | (0) |
- * Club domestic league appearances and goals as of 19 September 2026 ‡ National team caps and goals as of 10 June 2025

Uroš Račić (Serbian Cyrillic: Урош Рачић; born 17 March 1998) is a Serbian professional footballer who plays as a defensive midfielder for Greek Super League club Aris. He also plays for the Serbia national team.

== Club career ==
=== Early years ===
Born in Kraljevo, Račić started playing football in local football academies Bambi and Knjaz along with his twin brother Bogdan. After three years paying with Altina football school in Zemun, the twins returned to hometown and joined Sloga Kraljevo. They also played with Sloboda Čačak before joined OFK Beograd. After spending two years with the youth team, Račić was promoted to the first team for the 2015–16 season. Upon scoring a goal in 4–1 victory against Red Star Belgrade, he moved in opponent team with his twin brother and signed a three-year professional contract with Red Star on 13 March 2016.

=== Red Star Belgrade ===
Račić made his debut with Red Star Belgrade on 8 May 2016 in a friendly match against Olympiacos. On 14 May 2016, he made his SuperLiga debut in away match against Radnik Surdulica, coming on as a substitute for Aleksandar Katai.

During the 2017 summer pre-season, Račić was presented as one of the club's top 10 youth prospects. On 6 July, Račić made his first continental appearance for the club, in the second leg of the first qualifying round for the 2017–18 UEFA Europa League, in a 3–3 draw against Floriana. Račić scored his first senior goal for Red Star Belgrade in a 3−1 victory against OFK Bačka on 13 August. On the last day of the 2017 summer transfer window, Račić extended his contract with Red Star to 30 June 2021. He also scored in a 2–1 victory against Mladost Lučani in the 14th fixture of the Serbian SuperLiga campaign. His goal was proclaimed goal of the week in the domestic football competition, after which he won a wristwatch as a reward. On 5 May 2018, Račić was fouled for a penalty kick, which was scored by Dejan Joveljić in 4–0 home victory over Spartak Subotica. He scored and assisted teammate Nemanja Radonjić in the last season match against Voždovac on 19 May 2018.

=== Valencia ===
Račić joined Valencia in summer 2018 for €2.2 million from Red Star Belgrade. On 13 June 2018, he signed a four-year contract, but was assigned to the B-team in Segunda División B. A fixed-rate clause of €100 million was inserted in his contract. The same year on 4 December, Račić made his debut for Valencia in a 1–0 victory against CD Ebro in the Copa del Rey.

On 14 January 2019, Račić joined Segunda División club CD Tenerife on loan until the end of the season. He was then loaned to Portuguese team FC Famalicão in August 2019.

=== Sassuolo ===
On 16 August 2023, Račić moved to Serie A side Sassuolo.

On 22 August 2024, Račić completed a move to EFL Championship side West Bromwich Albion on a season long loan. On 1 February 2025, Račić returned to Braga on loan with a €2.5 million option to buy.

=== Aris ===
On 14 July 2025, Račić signed a four-year contract with Aris in Greece.

== International career ==
As a member of Serbia national under-18 football team, Račić played several matches in 2016 and scored one goal against Armenia on 15 March 2016. In August 2016, Račić was called up to the Serbia U19 squad for Stevan Vilotić Memorial Tournament, where he debuted in opening match against United States. In a friendly match against Georgia on 8 October 2016, Račić scored his first goal for U19 national team from a penalty kick.

On 9 March 2017, Račić scored against Bosnia and Herzegovina in the elite qualification round for the 2017 UEFA European Under-19 Championship. Račić got his first call-up to the Serbian under-21 team by coach Goran Đorović in December 2017. He made his debut for the team in an away friendly against Qatar on 17 December 2017.

On 24 March 2021, Račić debuted for the Serbian senior squad in a 2022 FIFA World Cup qualification against the Republic of Ireland. In November 2022, he was selected in Serbia's squad for the 2022 FIFA World Cup in Qatar,

== Style of play ==
"Račić is most similar like Slaviša Jokanović, the real 'six'. He is a defensive midfielder with an extraordinary jump, great game review and incredible intelligence. He will just demonstrate his quality in the future."

— Zvezdan Terzić, general director of Red Star Belgrade, December 2017

Standing at 6-foot-4-inches (1.93 m), Račić is a right-footed footballer. He joined Red Star Belgrade as a successor to Marko Grujić and player who usually plays on central midfield position, being capable of playing both attacking and defensive role equally. Račić also played as a centre-back in a friendly during the Miodrag Božović era. In August 2017, Račić was linked with Juventus, when he was also compared with Sergej Milinković-Savić. Račić emphasized Paul Pogba as his idol.

"I saw him on the Eternal Derby. He is very tall, young and right-footed midfielder, a typical Balkan player with good ball control."

— Predrag Mijatović, former Yugoslav international footballer, June 2018

When Račić's transfer to Valencia was announced, former footballer of the club Predrag Mijatović described Račić in Spanish media. Mijatović said he watched him against his former club, Partizan and mentioned Račić's physical characteristics. He also described his mode of play, but emphasized a difference in quality between the Serbian SuperLiga and La Liga.

== Career statistics ==
=== Club ===
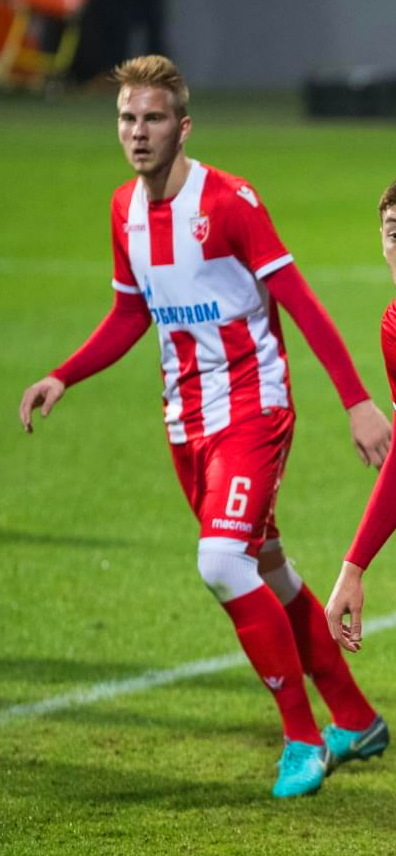
Račić playing for Red Star Belgrade in a 2018 friendly against Zenit Saint Petersburg

As of match played 23 August 2025

Appearances and goals by club, season and competition
| Club | Season | League | | | National cup (Note: Includes Serbian Cup, Copa del Rey, Taça de Portugal) | | Europe | | Total | |
| Club | Season | Division | Apps | Goals | Apps | Goals | Apps | Goals | Apps | Goals |
|---|---|---|---|---|---|---|---|---|---|---|
| OFK Beograd | 2015–16 | Serbian SuperLiga | 0 | 0 | 0 | 0 | — | | 0 | 0 |
| Red Star Belgrade | 2015–16 | Serbian SuperLiga | 1 | 0 | — | | — | | 1 | 0 |
| Red Star Belgrade | 2016–17 | Serbian SuperLiga | 8 | 0 | 2 | 0 | 0 | 0 | 10 | 0 |
| Red Star Belgrade | 2017–18 | Serbian SuperLiga | 22 | 3 | 2 | 0 | 10 (Note: Appearances in UEFA Europa League) | 0 | 34 | 3 |
| Red Star Belgrade | Total | | 31 | 3 | 4 | 0 | 10 | 0 | 45 | 3 |
| Valencia | 2018–19 | La Liga | 0 | 0 | 1 | 0 | — | | 1 | 0 |
| Valencia | 2020–21 | La Liga | 31 | 1 | 2 | 1 | — | | 33 | 2 |
| Valencia | 2021–22 | La Liga | 28 | 0 | 6 | 0 | — | | 34 | 0 |
| Valencia | Total | | 59 | 1 | 9 | 1 | — | | 68 | 2 |
| Valencia B (loan) | 2018–19 | Segunda División B | 15 | 1 | — | | — | | 15 | 1 |
| Tenerife (loan) | 2018–19 | Segunda División | 16 | 1 | — | | — | | 16 | 1 |
| Famalicão (loan) | 2019–20 | Primeira Liga | 33 | 3 | 5 | 0 | — | | 38 | 3 |
| Braga (loan) | 2022–23 | Primeira Liga | 25 | 1 | 5 | 3 | 7 (Note: Five appearances in UEFA Europa League, two appearances in UEFA Europa Conference League) | 0 | 37 | 4 |
| Sassuolo | 2023–24 | Serie A | 22 | 1 | 1 | 0 | — | | 23 | 1 |
| West Bromwich Albion (loan) | 2024–25 | Championship | 21 | 0 | 1 | 0 | — | | 22 | 0 |
| Braga (loan) | 2024–25 | Primeira Liga | 14 | 3 | 1 | 0 | 0 | 0 | 15 | 3 |
| Career total | | | 236 | 14 | 25 | 4 | 17 | 0 | 278 | 18 |

=== International ===
As of 10 June 2025

Appearances and goals by national team and year
| National team | Year | Apps | Goals |
|---|---|---|---|
| Serbia | 2021 | 3 | 0 |
| Serbia | 2022 | 6 | 0 |
| Serbia | 2023 | 3 | 0 |
| Serbia | 2024 | 0 | 0 |
| Serbia | 2025 | 1 | 0 |
| Total | | 13 | 0 |

== Honours ==
Red Star Belgrade

- Serbian SuperLiga: 2015–16, 2017–18

Valencia

- Copa del Rey: 2018–19
