= 2025–26 Valencia CF season =

Valencia CF
2025–26 season
- Owner: Peter Lim
- President: Kiat Lim
- Head coach: Carlos Corberán
- Stadium: Mestalla Stadium
- La Liga: 9th
- Copa del Rey: Quarter-finals
- Top goalscorer: League: Hugo Duro (10); All: Hugo Duro (11)
- Average home league attendance: 44,699
Home colours	Away colours	Third colours

The 2025–26 season is the 107th season in the history of Valencia CF and the club's 39th consecutive season in La Liga. In addition to the domestic league, the team is scheduled to participate in the Copa del Rey.

== Transfers ==
=== In ===
Pos.	Player	Transferred from	Type	Date	Source
DF	(Switzerland) Eray Cömert	(Spain) Valladolid	Loan return	30 June 2025	
FW	(Spain) Alberto Marí	(Spain) Zaragoza	Loan return	30 June 2025	
GK	(Spain) Cristian Rivero	(Spain) Albacete	Loan return	30 June 2025	
DF	(Turkey) Cenk Özkacar	(Spain) Valladolid	Loan return	30 June 2025	
MF	(Spain) Dani Raba	(Spain) Leganés	Transfer	1 July 2025	
GK	(Spain) Julen Agirrezabala	(Spain) Athletic Bilbao	Loan with buy option	11 July 2025	
DF	(Spain) José Manuel Copete	(Spain) Mallorca	Transfer	26 July 2025	
MF	(France) Baptiste Santamaria	(France) Rennes	Transfer	7 August 2025	
MF	(Switzerland) Filip Ugrinić	(Switzerland) Young Boys	Transfer	8 August 2025	
FW	(Netherlands) Arnaut Danjuma	(Spain) Villarreal	Transfer	10 August 2025	
MF	(Belgium) Largie Ramazani	(England) Leeds United	Loan	28 August 2025	
FW	(Argentina) Lucas Beltrán	(Italy) Fiorentina	Loan	1 September 2025	
FW	(Nigeria) Umar Sadiq	(Spain) Real Sociedad	Transfer	9 January 2026	

=== Out ===
Pos.	Player	Transferred to	Type	Date	Source
GK	(Spain) Jaume Doménech	Retired	End of contract	30 June 2025	
GK	(Georgia (country)) Giorgi Mamardashvili	(England) Liverpool	Transfer	1 July 2025	
DF	(England) Max Aarons	(England) Bournemouth	Loan return	1 July 2025	
FW	(Nigeria) Umar Sadiq	(Spain) Real Sociedad	Loan return	1 July 2025	
FW	(Spain) Rafa Mir	(Spain) Sevilla	Loan return	1 July 2025	
MF	(Argentina) Enzo Barrenechea	(England) Aston Villa	Loan return	1 July 2025	
MF	(Spain) Iván Jaime	(Portugal) Porto	Loan return	1 July 2025	
DF	(Spain) Yarek Gasiorowski	(Netherlands) PSV Eindhoven	Transfer	10 July 2025	
DF	(Spain) Cristhian Mosquera	(England) Arsenal	Transfer	25 July 2025	
DF	(Turkey) Cenk Özkacar	(Germany) 1. FC Köln	Loan with buy option	9 August 2025	
MF	(Spain) Fran Pérez	(Spain) Rayo Vallecano	Transfer	15 August 2025	
MF	(Spain) Hugo Guillamón	(Croatia) Hajduk Split	Transfer	26 August 2025	
FW	(Spain) Alberto Marí	(Spain) Mirandés	Loan	31 August 2025	
MF	(Spain) Sergi Canós	(Spain) Valladolid	Loan	1 September 2025	

== Competitions ==
=== Overall record ===
Competition	First match	Last match	Starting round	Record							
Competition	First match	Last match	Starting round	Pld	W	D	L	GF	GA	GD	Win %
La Liga	16 August 2025	May 2026	Matchday 1	0	0	0	0	0	0	+0	—
Copa del Rey				0	0	0	0	0	0	+0	—
Total				0	0	0	0	0	0	+0	—

Source: Competitions

=== La Liga ===
==== League table ====
Pos	Team	Pld	W	D	L	GF	GA	GD	Pts	Qualification or relegation
7	Getafe	38	15	6	17	32	38	−6	51	Qualification for the Conference League play-off round
8	Rayo Vallecano	38	12	14	12	41	44	−3	50	
9	Valencia	38	13	10	15	46	55	−9	49	
10	Real Sociedad	38	11	13	14	59	61	−2	46 (Note: Tied on head-to-head points and goal difference. Real Sociedad placed ahead of Espanyol on overall goal difference.)	Qualification for the Europa League league phase (Note: Real Sociedad qualified for the Europa League league phase as the 2025–26 Copa del Rey winners.)
11	Espanyol	38	12	10	16	43	55	−12	46	

Source: LaLiga EA Sports
Rules for classification: 1) Points; 2) Head-to-head points; 3) Head-to-head goal difference; 4) Goal difference; 5) Goals scored; 6) Fair-play points
(Note: Head-to-head record is used only after all the matches between the teams in question have been played)

==== Matches ====
16 August 2025 1	Valencia	1–1	Real Sociedad	Valencia
21:30 CEST (UTC+2)	Gayà (yellow card) 27'; López 57'	Report	Turrientes (yellow card) 45+3'; Kubo 60'; Muñoz (yellow card) 67'	Stadium: Mestalla; Attendance: 45,333; Referee: José María Sánchez Martínez

24 August 2025 2	CA Osasuna	1–0	Valencia	El Sadar Stadium
	Budimir 9'	Report	Gayà (red card) 22'	Attendance: 21,226; Referee: Jesús Gil Manzano

29 August 2025 3	Valencia	3–0	Getafe CF	Mestalla Stadium
	Diakhaby 30'; Danjuma 54'; Duro 90+6'	Report		Attendance: 45,449; Referee: Francisco Hernández Maeso

14 September 2025 4	Barcelona	6–0	Valencia	Sant Joan Despí
21:00 CEST (UTC+2)	Fermín 29', 56'; Raphinha 53', 66'; Lewandowski 76', 86'	Report	Diakhaby (yellow card) 41'	Stadium: Johan Cruyff Stadium; Attendance: 5,862; Referee: Guillermo Cuadra Fernández

20 September 2025 5	Valencia	2–0	Athletic Bilbao	Valencia
	Gayà (yellow card) 59'; Santamaria 73'; Duro 90+3'	Report	Navarro (yellow card) 20'; Vivian (red card) 61'	Stadium: Mestalla; Attendance: 46,004

23 September 2025 6	Espanyol	2–2	Valencia	Cornellà de Llobregat
19:00 UTC+2	Pickel (yellow card) 38'; Cabrera 59'; Puado 96'	Report	Danjuma 15'; Diakhaby (yellow card) 38'; López (yellow card) 43'; Santamaria (yellow card) 54'; Duro 62'; Agirrezabala (yellow card) 90+4'	Stadium: RCDE Stadium; Attendance: 26,802; Referee: José Luis Guzmán Mansilla

30 September 2025 7	Valencia	1–2	Real Oviedo	Mestalla Stadium
	Danjuma 4'	Report	Ilić (yellow card) 71' (goal) 85' (red card) 90+3'; Rondón 86'	Attendance: 40,364; Referee: Ricardo De Burgos Bengochea

4 October 2025 8	Girona	2–1	Valencia
	Vanat 18'; Martínez 63'; Martín (yellow card) 57' (red card) 80'; Francés (red card) 90+6'	Report	López 57'	Attendance: 10,867; Referee: Isidro Díaz de Mera

20 October 2025 9	Deportivo Alavés	0–0	Valencia	Mendizorrotza Stadium
		Report		Attendance: 15,564; Referee: Iosu Galech Apezteguía

25 October 2025 10	Valencia	0–2	Villarreal	Mestalla Stadium
		Report	Moreno 45' (pen.); Comesaña 57'	Attendance: 45,560; Referee: Javier Alberola Rojas

1 November 2025 11	Real Madrid	4–0	Valencia	Madrid
21:00 UTC+1	Mbappé 19' (pen.), 31'; Bellingham 44'; Carreras 82'	Report		Stadium: Bernabéu; Attendance: 74,796; Referee: Mateo Busquets Ferrer

12	Valencia	v	Real Betis

13	Valencia	v	Levante

14	Rayo Vallecano	v	Valencia

15	Valencia	v	Sevilla

16	Atlético Madrid	v	Valencia

17	Valencia	v	Mallorca

18	Celta	v	Valencia

11 January 2026 19	Levante	1–1	Espanyol	Valencia
	Losada 55'	Report	García (yellow card) 45+1'; Romero 53'	Stadium: Estadi Ciutat de València; Attendance: 20,501; Referee: César Soto Grado

20	v

21	v

22	v

23	v

24	v

25	v

26	v

27	v

28	v

29	v

5 April 2026 30	Valencia CF	2–3	Celta Vigo
	Rodríguez 12', 93'	Report	Moriba 56'; López 60'; Swedberg 81'	Attendance: 43,764; Referee: Iosu Galech Apezteguía

31	v

32	v

33	v

34	v

10 May 2026 35	Athletic Bilbao	0–1	Valencia CF	San Mamés
		Report	Sadiq 72'	Attendance: 46,880; Referee: Miguel Ortiz Arias

36	v

37	v

24 May 2026 38	Valencia	v	Barcelona	Valencia
--:-- CEST (UTC+2)		Report		Stadium: Mestalla
