= 2023–24 Valencia CF season =

Valencia CF
2023–24 season
- Owner: Peter Lim
- President: Lay Hoon Chan
- Head coach: Rubén Baraja
- Stadium: Mestalla
- La Liga: 9th
- Copa del Rey: Round of 16
- Top goalscorer: League: Hugo Duro (13); All: Hugo Duro (13)
- Highest home attendance: 47,427 vs Real Madrid
- Lowest home attendance: 36,138 vs Girona
- Biggest win: Valencia 3–0 Atlético Madrid; Cádiz 1–4 Valencia
- Biggest defeat: Real Madrid 5–1 Valencia
Home colours	Away colours	Third colours

The 2023–24 season was Valencia CF's 105th season in existence and 37th consecutive season in La Liga. They also competed in the Copa del Rey.

== Players ==
=== La Liga squad information ===
No.	Pos.	Nat.	Player	Date of birth (age)	Signed in	Contract ends	Last club
Goalkeepers
1	GK	(Spain)	Jaume Doménech	5 November 1990 (aged 33)	2015	2024	(Spain) Valencia Mestalla
13	GK	(Spain)	Cristian Rivero	21 March 1998 (aged 26)	2019	2024	(Spain) Alcorcón
25	GK	(Georgia (country))	Giorgi Mamardashvili	29 September 2000 (aged 23)	2021	2027	(Georgia (country)) Dinamo Tbilisi
Defenders
3	DF	(Spain)	Cristhian Mosquera	27 June 2004 (aged 20)	2021	2025	(Spain) Valencia Mestalla
4	DF	(Guinea) (France)	Mouctar Diakhaby	19 December 1996 (aged 27)	2018	2027	(France) Lyon
12	DF	(Portugal)	Thierry Correia	9 March 1999 (aged 25)	2019	2026	(Portugal) Sporting CP
14	DF	(Spain)	José Gayà (captain)	25 May 1995 (aged 29)	2012	2027	(Spain) Valencia Mestalla
15	DF	(Turkey)	Cenk Özkacar	6 October 2000 (aged 23)	2022	2028	(France) Lyon
20	DF	(Guadeloupe) (France)	Dimitri Foulquier	23 March 1993 (aged 31)	2021	2025	(Spain) Granada
21	DF	(Spain)	Jesús Vázquez	2 January 2003 (aged 21)	2021	2025	(Spain) Valencia Mestalla
Midfielders
6	MF	(Spain)	Hugo Guillamón	31 January 2000 (aged 24)	2018	2026	(Spain) Valencia Mestalla
8	MF	(Spain)	Javi Guerra	13 May 2003 (aged 21)	2021	2027	(Spain) Valencia Mestalla
10	MF	(Portugal)	André Almeida	30 May 2000 (aged 24)	2022	2027	(Portugal) Vitória de Guimarães
18	MF	(Spain)	Pepelu	11 August 1998 (aged 25)	2023	2028	(Spain) Levante
19	MF	(Morocco)	Selim Amallah	15 November 1996 (aged 27)	2023	2024	(Spain) Valladolid
23	MF	(Spain)	Fran Pérez	9 September 2003 (aged 20)	2020	2026	(Spain) Valencia Mestalla
Forwards
7	FW	(Spain)	Sergi Canós	2 February 1997 (aged 27)	2023	2027	(England) Brentford
9	FW	(Spain)	Hugo Duro	10 November 1999 (aged 24)	2021	2026	(Spain) Getafe
11	FW	(Spain)	Peter González	25 July 2002 (aged 21)	2024	2024	(Spain) Real Madrid
16	FW	(Spain)	Diego López	13 May 2002 (aged 22)	2021	2026	(Spain) Valencia Mestalla
17	FW	(Ukraine)	Roman Yaremchuk	27 November 1995 (aged 28)	2023	2024	(Belgium) Club Brugge
Players who left the club during season
5	DF	(Brazil)	Gabriel Paulista	26 December 1990 (aged 33)	2017	2024	(England) Arsenal
22	FW	(Brazil)	Marcos André	20 October 1996 (aged 26)	2021	2026	(Spain) Valladolid
Players who were loaned out during season
11	MF	(Spain)	Samu Castillejo	18 January 1995 (aged 28)	2022	2025	(Italy) Milan
17	MF	(New Caledonia)	Koba Koindredi	27 October 2001 (aged 21)	2021	2025	(Spain) Oviedo
24	DF	(Switzerland)	Eray Cömert	4 February 1998 (aged 25)	2022	2025	(Switzerland) Basel

=== Reserve squad information ===
No.	Pos.	Nat.	Player	Date of birth (age)	Signed in	Contract ends	Last club
Goalkeepers
	GK	(Spain)	Nil Ruiz	11 February 2003 (aged 21)	2023	2026	(Spain) Barcelona B
	GK	(Bulgaria)	David Vassilev	20 January 2004 (aged 20)	2023	2024	(Spain) Valencia Mestalla
Defenders
31	DF	(Spain)	Rubén Iranzo	14 March 2003 (aged 21)	2021	2025	(Spain) Valencia Mestalla
33	DF	(Spain)	Diego Moreno Cledera	18 January 2002 (aged 22)	2023	2024	(Spain) Valladolid B
34	DF	(Spain)	Yarek Gasiorowski	12 January 2005 (aged 19)	2022	2027	(Spain) Valencia Mestalla
	DF	(Spain)	Simón Luca Pérez	2 November 1999 (aged 24)	2022	2024	(Spain) Rayo Cantabria
	DF	(Spain)	Iván Muñoz	27 February 2002 (aged 22)	2021	2025	(Spain) Valencia Mestalla
Midfielders
26	MF	(Spain)	Javi Navarro	24 February 2004 (aged 20)	2023	2025	(Spain) Valencia Mestalla
28	MF	(Norway)	Alexander Gurendal	2 March 2005 (aged 19)	2023	2026	(Spain) Valencia Mestalla
30	MF	(Spain)	Hugo González	7 February 2003 (aged 21)	2021	2024	(Spain) Valencia Mestalla
32	MF	(Spain)	Martín Tejón	12 April 2004 (aged 20)	2020	2024	(Spain) Valencia Mestalla
	MF	(Spain)	Ismael Santana	18 January 2004 (aged 20)	2023	2025	(Spain) Valencia Mestalla
	MF	(Spain)	Borja Calvo	29 January 2002 (aged 22)	2023	2024	(Spain) La Nucía
	MF	(Ghana)	Ali Fadal	2 March 2005 (aged 19)	2023	2025	(Spain) Valencia Mestalla
	MF	(Spain)	Marco Camus	16 November 2002 (aged 21)	2023	2025	(Spain) Racing Santander
Forwards
27	FW	(Spain)	Pablo Gozálbez	30 April 2001 (aged 23)	2019	2025	(Spain) Valencia Mestalla
43	FW	(Spain)	Mario Dominguez	10 February 2004 (aged 20)	2023	2025	(Spain) Valencia Mestalla
46	FW	(Spain)	Alberto Marí	11 July 2001 (aged 22)	2021	2026	(Spain) Vitoria
	FW	(Spain)	Joselu Pérez	12 March 2004 (aged 20)	2023	2025	(Spain) Valencia Mestalla
Players who left the club during season
	MF	(Spain)	Vicente Esquerdo	2 January 1999 (aged 24)	2018	2024	(Spain) Ciudad de Benidorm Youth
35	MF	(Spain)	Jesús Santiago	24 May 2004 (aged 19)	2018	2026	(Spain) Torre Pacheco
Players who were loaned out during season
29	DF	(Spain)	César Tárrega	26 February 2002 (aged 21)	2021	2028	(Spain) Atlético Levante
	MF	(Spain)	Azael García	1 January 2004 (aged 20)	2023	2024	(Spain) Valencia Mestalla

== Transfers ==
=== In ===
No.	Pos.	Player	Transferred from	Fee	Date	Team	Ref.
	DF	(Spain) Jorge Sáenz	(Spain) Leganés	Loan return	1 July 2023	First team	(Note: Left club after end of loan, rejoined Leganés permanently for €400,000)
	DF	(Spain) Izan Llinares	(Spain) Torrent	Loan return	1 July 2023	Mestalla	(Note: Left club after end of loan, joined Castellón B)
	MF	(Spain) Víctor Esquerdo	(Spain) Hércules B	Loan return	1 July 2023	Mestalla	(Note: Left club after end of loan, joined Murcia B)
	MF	(Spain) Miguel Arilla	(Spain) Torrent	Loan return	1 July 2023	Mestalla	
	MF	(Peru) Alessandro Burlamaqui	(Spain) Intercity	Loan return	1 July 2023	Mestalla	
17	MF	(New Caledonia) Koba Koindredi	(Spain) Oviedo	Loan return	1 July 2023	Mestalla	
8	MF	(Serbia) Uroš Račić	(Portugal) Braga	Loan return	1 July 2023	First team	
15	DF	(Turkey) Cenk Özkacar	(France) Lyon	€5,000,000	1 July 2023	First team	
18	MF	(Spain) Pepelu	(Spain) Levante	€5,000,000	8 July 2023	First team	
	DF	(Spain) Diego Moreno Cledera	(Spain) Valladolid Promesas	Free	11 July 2023	Mestalla	
	GK	(Spain) Nil Ruiz	(Spain) Barcelona Atlètic	Free	22 July 2023	Mestalla	
	MF	(Spain) Borja Calvo	(Spain) La Nucía	Free	9 August 2023	Mestalla	
7	FW	(Spain) Sergi Canós	(England) Brentford	€250,000	20 August 2023	First team	
	MF	(Spain) Marco Camus	(Spain) Racing Santander	Free	23 August 2023	Mestalla	
19	MF	(Morocco) Selim Amallah	(Spain) Valladolid	Season loan (with €7,500,000 buy option)	29 August 2023	First team	
17	FW	(Ukraine) Roman Yaremchuk	(Belgium) Club Brugge	Season loan	1 September 2023	First team	
11	FW	(Spain) Peter González	(Spain) Real Madrid	Season loan	31 January 2024	First team	
Total				€10,250,000			

=== Out ===
No.	Pos.	Player	Transferred to	Fee	Date	Team	Ref.
16	MF	(Brazil) Samuel Lino	(Spain) Atlético Madrid	Loan return	1 July 2023	First team	
17	MF	(Spain) Nico González	(Spain) Barcelona	Loan return	1 July 2023	First team	(Note: Joined Porto permanently after end of loan, fee may eventually rise to €8,500,000 due to add-ons)
8	MF	(Guinea) Ilaix Moriba	(Germany) RB Leipzig	Loan return	1 July 2023	First team	
9	FW	(Netherlands) Justin Kluivert	(Italy) Roma	Loan return	1 July 2023	First team	(Note: Joined Bournemouth permanently after end of loan, fee may eventually rise to €12,500,000 due to add-ons)
3	DF	(Spain) Toni Lato	(Spain) Mallorca	Free	1 July 2023	First team	
1	GK	(Spain) Iago Herrerín	(Cyprus) AEK Larnaca	Free	1 July 2023	First team	
	GK	(Spain) Emilio Bernad	(Spain) Racing de Ferrol	Free	1 July 2023	Mestalla	
	GK	(Spain) Charlie Pérez	(Spain) Castellón B	Free	1 July 2023	Mestalla	
	DF	(Spain) Izan Llinares	(Spain) Castellón B	Free	1 July 2023	Mestalla	
	DF	(Spain) Jorge Sáenz	(Spain) Leganés	€400,000	1 July 2023	Mestalla	
	MF	(Spain) Víctor Esquerdo	(Spain) Real Murcia B	Free	1 July 2023	Mestalla	
	MF	(Spain) Dario Serra	(Netherlands) Go Ahead Eagles	Free	1 July 2023	Mestalla	
	MF	(Spain) Martí Soler		Free	1 July 2023	Mestalla	
	MF	(Spain) Miguel Arilla		Free	1 July 2023	Mestalla	
	MF	(Spain) Adri Gómez		Free	1 July 2023	Mestalla	
7	FW	(Uruguay) Edinson Cavani	(Argentina) Boca Juniors	Free	29 July 2023	First team	
4	MF	(United States) Yunus Musah	(Italy) Milan	€20,000,000	5 August 2023	First team	(Note: Fee may eventually rise to €21,000,000 due to add-ons)
	DF	(Uruguay) Facundo González	(Italy) Juventus	€2,000,000	8 August 2023	Mestalla	(Note: Fee may eventually rise to €3,000,000 due to add-ons & 20% sell-on clause for future transfer)
17	MF	(New Caledonia) Koba Koindredi	(Portugal) Estoril	Season loan	8 August 2023	Mestalla	
19	MF	(Serbia) Uroš Račić	(Italy) Sassuolo	€2,500,000	16 August 2023	First team	
	MF	(Peru) Alessandro Burlamaqui	(Spain) Intercity	Free	24 August 2023	Mestalla	
24	DF	(Switzerland) Eray Cömert	(France) Nantes	Season loan (with €3,000,000 buy option)	27 August 2023	First team	
22	FW	(Brazil) Marcos André	(Spain) Valladolid	€2,000,000	29 August 2023	First team	(Note: 50% sell-on clause for future transfer)
11	MF	(Spain) Samu Castillejo	(Italy) Sassuolo	Season loan (with €250,000 buy option)	1 September 2023	First team	
5	DF	(Brazil) Gabriel Paulista	(Spain) Atlético Madrid	Free	31 January 2024	First team	
35	MF	(Spain) Jesús Santiago	(Spain) Getafe	Undisclosed	1 February 2024	Mestalla	
Total				€26,900,000			

== Pre-season and friendlies ==
Win Draw Loss

18 July 2023 Friendly	Valencia	1–0	Nottingham Forest	Valencia
19:00 CEST (UTC+2)	Guerra 47'	Report		Stadium: Ciudad Deportiva de Paterna; Attendance: 0

22 July 2023 Friendly	Spartak Trnava	0–1	Valencia	Trnava, Slovakia
18:00 CEST (UTC+2)	Djuricin (penalty missed) 9'	Report	Marí 25' (pen.)	Stadium: Anton Malatinský Stadium; Attendance: 12,173; Referee: Peter Kralovic (Slovakia)

25 July 2023 Friendly	St. Gallen	1–3	Valencia	St. Gallen, Switzerland
20:00 CEST (UTC+2)	Stevanovic 4'	Report	Foulquier 16'; Marí 18', 49'; López (yellow card) 39'; Gozálbez (yellow card) 40'	Stadium: kybunpark Attendance: 3,980

29 July 2023 Friendly	Valencia	2–0	Alavés	Valencia
19:00 CEST (UTC+2)	Gabriel (yellow card) 14'; Özkacar 40'; Tejón 63'	Report	Abqar (yellow card) 55'	Stadium: Ciudad Deportiva de Paterna; Referee: Iván Caparrós Hernández

5 August 2023 Orange Trophy	Valencia	1–2	Aston Villa	Valencia
21:00 CEST (UTC+2)	Gabriel (yellow card) 45+2'; Duro (yellow card) 58'; Chambers 88' (o.g.)	Report	Watkins 22'; Bailey (yellow card) 45+2'; Douglas Luiz (yellow card) 58'; Buendía 66'	Stadium: Mestalla; Referee: Guillermo Cuadra Fernández (Spain)

28 May 2024 Juan Fuster Zaragoza Trophy	Benidorm	1–3	Valencia	Benidorm
19:00 CEST (UTC+2)	Cabezas 81'	Report	Izquierdo 4' (o.g.); Joselu 16', 78'	Stadium: Estadio Municipal Guillermo Amor; Referee: Álvaro Cánovas García Villarrubia

== Competitions ==
=== Overall record ===
Competition	First match	Last match	Starting round	Final position	Record							
Competition	First match	Last match	Starting round	Final position	Pld	W	D	L	GF	GA	GD	Win %
La Liga	11 August 2023	26 May 2024	Matchday 1	9th	38	13	10	15	40	45	−5	34.21
Copa del Rey	2 November 2023	17 January 2024	First round	Round of 16	4	3	0	1	6	4	+2	75.00
Total					42	16	10	16	46	49	−3	38.10

Source: Soccerway

=== La Liga ===
==== League table ====
Pos	Team	Pld	W	D	L	GF	GA	GD	Pts	Qualification or relegation
7	Real Betis	38	14	15	9	48	45	+3	57	Qualification for the Conference League play-off round (Note: Since the winners of the 2023–24 Copa del Rey, Athletic Bilbao, qualified for European competition based on league position, the Europa League berth awarded to the Copa del Rey winners was passed to the sixth-placed team, and the Conference League berth awarded to the sixth-placed team was passed to the seventh-placed team.)
8	Villarreal	38	14	11	13	65	65	0	53	
9	Valencia	38	13	10	15	40	45	−5	49	
10	Alavés	38	12	10	16	36	46	−10	46	
11	Osasuna	38	12	9	17	45	56	−11	45	

Source: LaLiga EA Sports
Rules for classification: 1) Points; 2) Head-to-head points; 3) Head-to-head goal difference; 4) Goal difference; 5) Goals scored; 6) Fair-play points
(Note: Head-to-head record is used only after all the matches between the teams in question have been played)

==== Results summary ====
Overall								Home						Away					
Pld	W	D	L	GF	GA	GD	Pts	W	D	L	GF	GA	GD	W	D	L	GF	GA	GD
38	13	10	15	40	45	−5	49	8	6	5	20	14	+6	5	4	10	20	31	−11

Source: La Liga

==== Results by round ====
Round	1	2	3	4	5	6	7	8	9	10	11	12	13	14	15	16	17	18	19	20	21	22	23	24	25	26	27	28	29	30	31	32	33	34	35	36	37	38
Ground	A	H	H	A	H	A	H	A	H	H	A	H	A	H	A	A	H	A	H	A	H	A	H	A	H	A	H	H	A	H	A	H	A	H	H	A	H	A
Result	W	W	L	L	W	D	L	L	D	W	D	W	L	D	L	L	D	W	W	W	W	L	W	L	D	W	D	W	L	D	W	L	L	L	D	L	L	D
Position	6	3	6	11	5	6	8	10	9	8	9	8	9	10	9	11	10	10	9	8	7	8	7	9	8	9	9	8	8	8	7	8	8	8	8	9	9	9

Source: La Liga
A = Away; H = Home; W = Win; D = Draw; L = Loss

==== Matches ====
The league fixtures were unveiled on 22 June 2023.

11 August 2023 1	Sevilla	1–2	Valencia	Seville
22:00 CEST (UTC+2)	Rakitić (yellow card) 15'; Gudelj (yellow card) 15'; En-Nesyri 67'; Badé (red card) 81'; Acuña (yellow card) 90+7'	Report	Diakhaby (yellow card) 10', (goal) 60'; Özkacar (yellow card) 16'; Guerra 88'	Stadium: Ramón Sánchez Pizjuán; Attendance: 34,184; Referee: José María Sánchez Martínez

18 August 2023 2	Valencia	1–0	Las Palmas	Valencia
21:30 CEST (UTC+2)	Pepelu 73' (pen.)	Report		Stadium: Mestalla; Attendance: 41,053; Referee: Javier Iglesias Villanueva

27 August 2023 3	Valencia	1–2	Osasuna	Valencia
19:30 CEST (UTC+2)	Correia (yellow card) 23'; Diakhaby (yellow card) 27'; Duro (yellow card) 59', (goal) 80'	Report	Oroz 24'; Barja (yellow card) 35'; Muñoz (yellow card) 62'; Budimir (yellow card) 90+1'; Moncayola (yellow card) 90+4'; Vidal 90+5'	Stadium: Mestalla; Attendance: 42,474; Referee: Juan Luis Pulido Santana

2 September 2023 4	Alavés	1–0	Valencia	Vitoria-Gasteiz
18:30 CEST (UTC+2)	Kike (penalty missed) 5'; Özkacar 6' (o.g.); Guridi (yellow card) 38'; Gorosabel (yellow card) 27'; Guevara (yellow card) 82'; Benavídez (yellow card) 89'	Report	Gayà (yellow card) 45+2'; Diakhaby (yellow card) 86'	Stadium: Mendizorrotza; Attendance: 16,641; Referee: Pablo González Fuertes

16 September 2023 5	Valencia	3–0	Atlético Madrid	Valencia
16:15 CEST (UTC+2)	Duro 5', 34'; Guerra 54'; Mamardashvili (yellow card) 56'	Report	Hermoso (yellow card) 23'; Llorente (yellow card) 36'; Griezmann (yellow card) 37'; Saúl (yellow card) 74'; Barrios (yellow card) 86'	Stadium: Mestalla; Attendance: 45,363; Referee: Jesús Gil Manzano

23 September 2023 6	Almería	2–2	Valencia	Almería
21:00 CEST (UTC+2)	Arribas 59', 69'; Montes (yellow card) 60'; Melero (yellow card) 83'; Ramazani (yellow card) 89'; Baptistão (yellow card) 90+11'	Report	López 14'; Pérez (yellow card) 51'; Guerra 63'; Diakhaby (yellow card) 86'	Stadium: Power Horse Stadium; Attendance: 14,266; Referee: Mateo Busquets Ferrer

27 September 2023 7	Valencia	0–1	Real Sociedad	Valencia
21:30 CEST (UTC+2)	Amallah (yellow card) 42' (yellow-red card) 45'; Guerra (yellow card) 45+3'; Mosquera (yellow card) 79'	Report	González de Zárate (yellow card) 14'; Pacheco (yellow card) 25'; Fernández 32', (yellow card) 62'; Traoré (yellow card) 45+2'; Méndez (yellow card) 68'; Merino (yellow card) 81'; Zubeldia (yellow card) 89'	Stadium: Mestalla; Attendance: 44,200; Referee: Alejandro Hernández Hernández

1 October 2023 8	Real Betis	3–0	Valencia	Seville
21:00 CEST (UTC+2)	Pérez (yellow card) 11'; Diao 41'; Roca 52'; Ezzalzouli 85'; Pezzella (yellow card) 90'	Report	Özkacar (yellow card) 40'; Gabriel (yellow card) 43'	Stadium: Benito Villamarín; Attendance: 50,163; Referee: Ricardo de Burgos Bengoetxea

7 October 2023 9	Mallorca	1–1	Valencia	Palma
18:30 CEST (UTC+2)	Rodríguez 5'; González (yellow card) 16'; S. Costa (yellow card) 36'	Report	López 45+3'; Pérez (yellow card) 69'; Gabriel (yellow card) 43'	Stadium: Estadi Mallorca Son Moix; Attendance: 17,659; Referee: Francisco José Hernández Maeso

23 October 2023 10	Valencia	2–0	Cádiz	Valencia
21:00 CEST (UTC+2)	Gayà 4'; Duro 25'	Report	Navarro (red card) 22'; Lucas Pires (yellow card) 68'; Fali (yellow card) 71'; Sobrino (yellow card) 90+2'	Stadium: Mestalla; Attendance: 41,647; Referee: Pablo González Fuertes

29 October 2023 11	Athletic Bilbao	2–2	Valencia	Bilbao
18:30 CET (UTC+1)	Paredes (yellow card) 12'; De Marcos 32'; D. García (yellow card) 55'; Ruiz de Galarreta (yellow card) 87'; Berenguer 90+7'	Report	Amallah (yellow card) 57'; Pérez 62'; Duro 68'	Stadium: San Mamés; Attendance: 15,225; Referee: Jorge Figueroa Vázquez

5 November 2023 12	Valencia	1–0	Granada	Valencia
16:15 CET (UTC+1)	Pepelu 45+7' (pen.); Guerra (yellow card) 51'; Gabriel (yellow card) 58'; López (yellow card) 83'	Report	Gumbau (yellow card) 12'; Sánchez (yellow card) 40'; Torrente (yellow card) 45+6'; Villar (yellow card) 78'; Zaragoza (yellow card) 90'	Stadium: Mestalla; Attendance: 44,922; Referee: Víctor García Verdura

11 November 2023 13	Real Madrid	5–1	Valencia	Madrid
21:00 CET (UTC+1)	Carvajal 3'; Vinícius 42', 49'; Rodrygo 50', 84'; Camavinga (yellow card) 62'	Report	Pepelu (yellow card) 34'; Foulquier (yellow card) 56'; Gabriel (yellow card) 67'; Duro 88'	Stadium: Santiago Bernabéu; Attendance: 72,475; Referee: José María Sánchez Martínez

25 November 2023 14	Valencia	0–0	Celta Vigo	Valencia
16:15 CET (UTC+1)	Amallah (yellow card) 77'; Pepelu (yellow card) 87'; Guillamón (yellow card) 90+2'	Report	Cervi (yellow card) 71'; Núñez (yellow card) 79'	Stadium: Mestalla; Attendance: 43,375; Referee: César Soto Grado

2 December 2023 15	Girona	2–1	Valencia	Girona
14:00 CET (UTC+1)	Blind (yellow card) 36'; Couto (yellow card) 42'; Stuani 82', 88'; Sávio (yellow card) 90+2'	Report	Duro 56', (yellow card) 77'; Gasiorowski (yellow card) 61'; Gabriel (yellow card) 90+6'	Stadium: Montilivi; Attendance: 13,343; Referee: Javier Iglesias Villanueva

8 December 2023 16	Getafe	1–0	Valencia	Getafe
21:00 CET (UTC+1)	Milla (yellow card) 57'; Djené (yellow card) 62'; Mayoral 87'; Duarte (red card) 90+3'	Report	Correia (yellow card) 42'; Gabriel (yellow card) 43' (yellow-red card) 50'; Guerra (red card) 88'; Foulquier (yellow card) 90+3'	Stadium: Coliseum; Attendance: 11,515; Referee: Guillermo Cuadra Fernández

16 December 2023 17	Valencia	1–1	Barcelona	Valencia
21:00 CET (UTC+1)	Pérez (yellow card) 65'; Guillamón 70'	Report	Félix 55'; De Jong (yellow card) 77'; Cancelo (yellow card) 80'	Stadium: Mestalla; Attendance: 46,492; Referee: Miguel Ángel Ortiz Arias

19 December 2023 18	Rayo Vallecano	0–1	Valencia	Madrid
19:00 CET (UTC+1)	Pérez (yellow card) 70'; Nteka (yellow card) 90+5'	Report	González (yellow card) 34'; Vázquez (yellow card) 50'; Canós 61'; Amallah (yellow card) 75'; Pérez (yellow card) 81'; Correia (red card) 90+1'; Diakhaby (yellow card) 90+5'	Stadium: Campo de Fútbol de Vallecas; Attendance: 12,290; Referee: Javier Alberola Rojas

2 January 2024 19	Valencia	3–1	Villarreal	Valencia
21:30 CET (UTC+1)	Yaremchuk 4'; Pepelu 27' (pen.), 57' (pen.); Gayà (yellow card) 64'; López (yellow card) 74'	Report	Bailly (yellow card) 37'; Parejo (yellow card) 49'; Capoue (yellow card) 56'; Gerard 73'; Terrats (yellow card) 80'; Cuenca (yellow card) 90+2'	Stadium: Mestalla; Attendance: 44,973; Referee: Jesús Gil Manzano

14 January 2024 20	Cádiz	1–4	Valencia	Cádiz
16:15 CET (UTC+1)	Alcaraz 21' (pen.), (yellow card) 63'; L. Hernández (yellow card) 30'; Alejo (yellow card) 57'; J. Hernández (yellow card) 87'	Report	Duro 8', (yellow card) 57'; López 52'; Capoue (yellow card) 56'; Mamardashvili (yellow card) 90+1'; Guerra 90+4'; Vázquez 90+8'	Stadium: Nuevo Mirandilla; Attendance: 18,622; Referee: Isidro Díaz de Mera Escuderos

20 January 2024 21	Valencia	1–0	Athletic Bilbao	Valencia
18:30 CET (UTC+1)	Duro 61'	Report	N. Williams (yellow card) 56'; Vivian (yellow card) 89'; Ares (yellow card) 90+2'	Stadium: Mestalla; Attendance: 45,344; Referee: Juan Luis Pulido Santana

28 January 2024 22	Atlético Madrid	2–0	Valencia	Madrid
21:00 CET (UTC+1)	Molina (yellow card) 48'; Lino 45+5'; Depay 57'; Saúl (yellow card) 83'	Report		Stadium: Cívitas Metropolitano; Attendance: 59,493; Referee: Ricardo de Burgos Bengoetxea

3 February 2024 23	Valencia	2–1	Almería	Valencia
14:00 CET (UTC+1)	Duro 14'; Yaremchuk 23', (yellow card) 24'; Pepelu (penalty missed) 62'; Guerra (yellow card) 24'; Mosquera (yellow card) 62'; Guillamón (yellow card) 73'	Report	Arribas 50'; Centelles (yellow card) 61'; González (yellow card) 64'; Lozano (yellow card) 72'; Baptistão (red card) 90+3'; Robertone (yellow card) 90+4'; Ramazani (yellow card) 90+4'	Stadium: Mestalla; Attendance: 42,877; Referee: Alejandro Muñiz Ruiz
Note: Baptistão was sent off for dissent after already being substituted out of the match.

10 February 2024 24	Las Palmas	2–0	Valencia	Las Palmas
21:00 CET (UTC+1)	Mármol (yellow card) 48'; Suárez 89'; M. Cardona 90+5', (yellow card) 90+6'	Report		Stadium: Estadio Gran Canaria; Attendance: 25,633; Referee: Guillermo Cuadra Fernández

17 February 2024 25	Valencia	0–0	Sevilla	Valencia
21:00 CET (UTC+1)		Report	Badé (yellow card) 78'	Stadium: Mestalla; Attendance: 44,506; Referee: César Soto Grado

2 March 2024 27	Valencia	2–2	Real Madrid	Valencia
21:00 CET (UTC+1)	Yaremchuk (yellow card) 4', (goal) 30'; Duro 27'; Diakhaby (yellow card) 83'	Report	Vinícius 45+5', 76', (yellow card) 72'; Valverde (yellow card) 80'; Joselu (yellow card) 90+9'; Bellingham (red card) 90+9'	Stadium: Mestalla; Attendance: 47,427; Referee: Jesús Gil Manzano

9 March 2024 28	Valencia	1–0	Getafe	Valencia
14:00 CET (UTC+1)	Duro 40'; Pepelu (yellow card) 67'; Guillamón (yellow card) 90'	Report	Moriba (yellow card) 43'; Carmona (yellow card) 78'; Djené (yellow card) 82'	Stadium: Mestalla; Attendance: 37,961; Referee: Juan Luis Pulido Santana

17 March 2024 29	Villarreal	1–0	Valencia	Villarreal
16:15 CET (UTC+1)	Femenía (yellow card) 12'; Coquelin (yellow card) 35'; Baena (penalty missed) 39', (yellow card) 41'; Cuenca (yellow card) 52', (goal) 54'; Mandi (yellow card) 70'	Report	Gayà (yellow card) 36'	Stadium: Estadio de la Cerámica; Attendance: 20,647; Referee: Jorge Figueroa Vázquez

30 March 2024 30	Valencia	0–0	Mallorca	Valencia
18:30 CET (UTC+1)		Report	Larin (yellow card) 31'; S. Costa (yellow card) 90'	Stadium: Mestalla; Attendance: 42,567; Referee: Miguel Ángel Ortiz Arias

4 April 2024 26	Granada	0–1	Valencia	Granada
20:00 CEST (UTC+2)	Boyé (yellow card) 59'; Jóźwiak (yellow card) 63'; Villar (yellow card) 79'	Report	Peter (yellow card) 70'; Almeida 77'	Stadium: Nuevo Los Cármenes; Attendance: 15,107; Referee: Alejandro Hernández Hernández
Note: The match was originally scheduled for 24 February 2024, but was postponed due to the Valencia residential complex fire.

15 April 2024 31	Osasuna	0–1	Valencia	Pamplona
21:00 CEST (UTC+2)	Budimir (penalty missed) 90+7'	Report	Almeida 18'; Duro (yellow card) 56'; Mamardashvili (yellow card) 85'	Stadium: El Sadar; Attendance: 19,480; Referee: José Luis Munuera Montero

20 April 2024 32	Valencia	1–2	Real Betis	Valencia
18:30 CEST (UTC+2)	Pepelu (yellow card) 43', (goal) 66' (pen.); Guillamón (yellow card) 77'	Report	Sabaly (yellow card) 13'; Pérez 19', 77'; Miranda (yellow card) 64'; Bakambu (yellow card) 64'	Stadium: Mestalla; Attendance: 46,371; Referee: Mateo Busquets Ferrer

29 April 2024 33	Barcelona	4–2	Valencia	Barcelona
21:00 CEST (UTC+2)	López 22'; Cubarsí (yellow card) 42'; Lewandowski 49', 82', 90+3'	Report	Duro 27'; Pepelu 38' (pen.); Mamardashvili (red card) 45+4'	Stadium: Estadi Olímpic Lluís Companys; Attendance: 30,167; Referee: Ricardo de Burgos Bengoetxea

5 May 2024 34	Valencia	0–1	Alavés	Valencia
18:30 CEST (UTC+2)	Duro (yellow card) 78'	Report	Blanco (yellow card) 11'; Tenaglia (yellow card) 22'; López 68'; Omorodion (yellow card) 77'	Stadium: Mestalla; Attendance: 44,643; Referee: Mario Melero López

12 May 2024 35	Valencia	0–0	Rayo Vallecano	Valencia
18:30 CEST (UTC+2)	Correia (yellow card) 58'	Report	De Frutos (yellow card) 32'; Chavarría (yellow card) 90+4'	Stadium: Mestalla; Attendance: 42,642; Referee: Juan Luis Pulido Santana

16 May 2024 36	Real Sociedad	1–0	Valencia	San Sebastián
22:00 CEST (UTC+2)	Silva 3'	Report	Guillamón (yellow card) 29'; Canós (yellow card) 90+4'	Stadium: Reale Arena; Attendance: 25,067; Referee: César Soto Grado

19 May 2024 37	Valencia	1–3	Girona	Valencia
19:00 CEST (UTC+2)	Foulquier (yellow card) 26'; Gasiorowski (yellow card) 61'; Pepelu 84' (pen.); Correia (yellow card) 90+2'	Report	Sávio 32'; Dovbyk 58'; Gasiorowski 67' (o.g.)	Stadium: Mestalla; Attendance: 36,138; Referee: Guillermo Cuadra Fernández

26 May 2024 38	Celta Vigo	2–2	Valencia	Vigo
16:15 CEST (UTC+2)	Aspas 49' (pen.); Douvikas 62'	Report	Domínguez 5' (o.g.); Marí 60' (pen.)	Stadium: Balaídos; Attendance: 21,878; Referee: Miguel Ángel Ortiz Arias

=== Copa del Rey ===
2 November 2023 First round	UD Logroñés	0–2	Valencia	Logroño
20:00 CET (UTC+1)	Vitoria (yellow card) 37'	Report	Yaremchuk (yellow card) 32'; González (yellow card) 39'; Gozálbez 45+1', (yellow card) 79'; López 88'	Stadium: Las Gaunas; Attendance: 8,010; Referee: Javier Iglesias Villanueva

5 December 2023 Second round	Arosa	0–1	Valencia	Vilagarcía de Arousa
21:00 CET (UTC+1)	Cárus (yellow card) 38'; Pereira (yellow card) 57'; Pacheco (yellow card) 72'; Míguez (yellow card) 83'; Mella (yellow card) 87'	Report	Yaremchuk 8', (yellow card) 37'; Iranzo (yellow card) 75'	Stadium: A Lomba; Attendance: 4,253; Referee: Isidro Díaz de Mera Escuderos

7 January 2024 Round of 32	Cartagena	1–2 (a.e.t.)	Valencia	Cartagena
19:00 CET (UTC+1)	Ortuño 4'; Alarcón (yellow card) 40'; Muñoz (yellow card) 43'; Calero (red card) 45+1'; Fontán (yellow card) 45+4'; Musto (yellow card) 47'	Report	Pepelu (yellow card) 40'; Özkacar (yellow card) 58'; Canós 73'; Gayà 106'	Stadium: Cartagonova; Attendance: 8,000; Referee: Jorge Figueroa Vázquez

17 January 2024 Round of 16	Valencia	1–3	Celta Vigo	Valencia
20:00 CET (UTC+1)	Pepelu 29' (pen.); Gasiorowski (yellow card) 86'	Report	De la Torre 13'; Douvikas 18' (pen.), 80'; Vázquez (yellow card) 48'; Swedberg (yellow card) 68'	Stadium: Mestalla; Attendance: 44,456; Referee: Ricardo de Burgos Bengoetxea

== Player statistics ==
=== Appearances and goals ===
As of 11 November 2023

No.	Pos.	Player	La Liga		Copa del Rey		Total	
No.	Pos.	Player	Apps	Goals	Apps	Goals	Apps	Goals
1	GK	(Spain) Jaume Doménech	0	0	1	0	1	0
3	DF	(Spain) Cristhian Mosquera	8+3	0	1	0	9	0
4	MF	(Guinea) (France) Mouctar Diakhaby	8	1	0	0	8	1
5	DF	(Brazil) Gabriel Paulista	9+1	0	0	0	8	0
6	DF	(Spain) Hugo Guillamón	0+8	0	1	0	6	0
7	FW	(Spain) Sergi Canós	2+4	0	1	0	4	0
8	MF	(Spain) Javi Guerra	11+2	3	0+1	0	11	3
9	FW	(Spain) Hugo Duro	12+1	6	0	0	11	5
10	MF	(Portugal) André Almeida	6+2	0	0	0	8	0
12	DF	(Portugal) Thierry Correia	12	0	0+1	0	10	0
13	GK	(Spain) Cristian Rivero	0	0	0	0	0	0
14	DF	(Spain) José Gayà	11	1	0+1	0	9	1
15	DF	(Turkey) Cenk Özkacar	7+1	0	0	0	8	0
16	FW	(Spain) Diego López	11+2	2	0+1	1	11	2
17	FW	(Ukraine) Roman Yaremchuk	2+5	0	1	0	5	0
18	MF	(Spain) Pepelu	13	2	0	0	11	1
19	MF	(Morocco) Selim Amallah	5+3	0	1	0	7	0
20	DF	(Guadeloupe) (France) Dimitri Foulquier	1+8	0	1	0	7	0
21	DF	(Spain) Jesús Vázquez	0+2	0	0	0	2	0
23	MF	(Spain) Fran Pérez	11+2	1	0+1	0	11	1
25	GK	(Georgia (country)) Giorgi Mamardashvili	13	0	0	0	11	0
27	MF	(Spain) Pablo Gozálbez	1+4	0	1	1	5	0
29	DF	(Spain) César Tárrega	0+1	0	1	0	1	0
30	MF	(Spain) Hugo González	0+5	0	1	0	4	0
34	MF	(Spain) (Poland) Yarek Gasiorowski	0+3	0	1	0	1	0
36	MF	(Spain) Mario Domínguez	0+3	0	0	0	3	0
