= Fran Pérez (footballer, born 2002) =

Spanish footballer

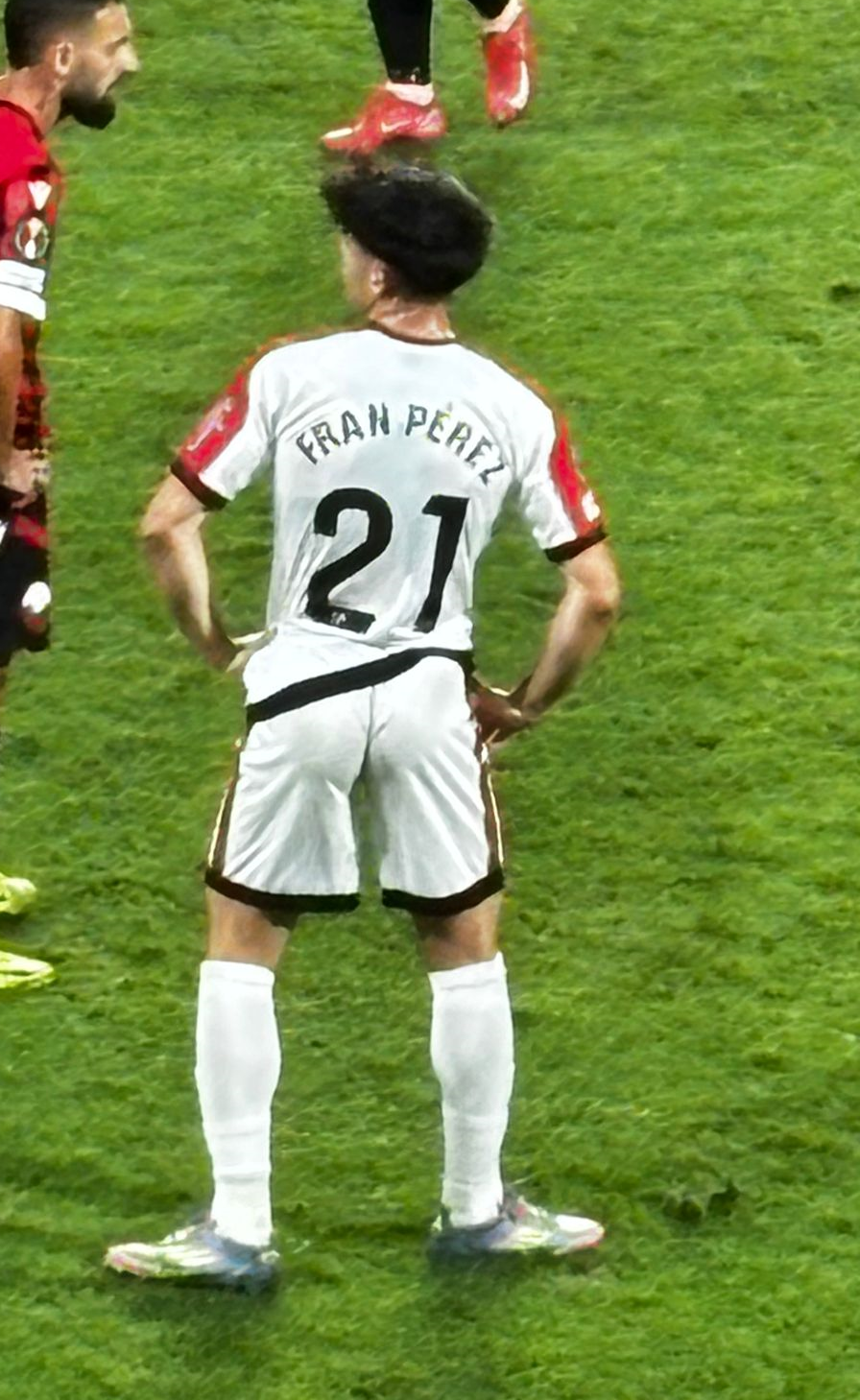
- Pérez with Rayo Vallecano in 2025

Personal information
- Full name: Francisco Pérez Martínez
- Date of birth: 9 September 2002 (age 24)
- Place of birth: Valencia, Spain
- Height: 1.76 m (5 ft 9 in)
- Position: Winger

Team information
- Current team: Rayo Vallecano
- Number: 21

Youth career
- 2011: Lacross Babel
- 2011–2021: Valencia

Senior career*
| Years | Team | Apps | (Gls) |
| 2020–2022 | Valencia B | 65 | (16) |
| 2022–2025 | Valencia | 65 | (1) |
| 2025– | Rayo Vallecano | 34 | (2) |

International career^{‡}
| 2023– | Spain U21 | 7 | (1) |
- * Club domestic league appearances and goals as of 19 October 2026 ‡ National team caps and goals as of 04:01, 16 October 2024 (UTC)

Francisco "Fran" Pérez Martínez (born 9 September 2002) is a Spanish professional footballer who plays mainly as a right winger for Rayo Vallecano.

== Club career ==
Born in Valencia, Pérez began playing football at the youth academy of Lacross Babel CF, before moving to the youth categories of Valencia CF in 2011. He made his senior debut with the reserves on 17 October 2020, coming on as a late substitute for Hugo González in a 2–2 Segunda División B away draw against Atzeneta UE.

On 20 November 2020, Pérez signed a professional contract with Valencia for 2 years. He scored his first senior goal on 12 September 2021, netting the B's second in a 3–1 Tercera División RFEF away win over Orihuela CF, and scored a further 12 times as the reserve side achieved promotion to Segunda Federación.

López made his professional – and La Liga – debut with Valencia on 29 August 2022, coming on as a late substitute in a 1–0 loss to Atlético Madrid. The following 7 March, he renewed his contract until 2027, and was definitely promoted to the main squad in August 2023.

On 15 August 2025, Pérez was transferred to La Liga club Rayo Vallecano and signed a four year deal.

== Personal life ==
Pérez is the son of the former Spanish footballer Francisco Rufete.

== Playing style ==
Pérez's playing style is characterized by his pace and physical strength. During his youth career, he recorded a high goal-scoring rate, and his technical play involves direct dribbling.

== Career statistics ==
=== Club ===
As of match played 19 October 2026

Appearances and goals by club, season and competition
| Club | Season | League | | | Copa del Rey | | Other | | Total | |
| Club | Season | Division | Apps | Goals | Apps | Goals | Apps | Goals | Apps | Goals |
|---|---|---|---|---|---|---|---|---|---|---|
| Valencia B | 2020–21 | Segunda División B | 21 | 0 | — | | — | | 21 | 0 |
| Valencia B | 2021–22 | Tercera División RFEF | 36 | 13 | — | | — | | 36 | 13 |
| Valencia B | 2022–23 | Segunda Federación | 8 | 3 | — | | — | | 8 | 3 |
| Valencia B | Total | | 65 | 16 | — | | — | | 65 | 16 |
| Valencia | 2022–23 | La Liga | 7 | 0 | 3 | 0 | 1 (Note: Appearance in Supercopa de España) | 0 | 11 | 0 |
| Valencia | 2023–24 | La Liga | 32 | 1 | 4 | 0 | — | | 36 | 1 |
| Valencia | 2024–25 | La Liga | 26 | 0 | 3 | 0 | — | | 29 | 0 |
| Valencia | Total | | 65 | 1 | 10 | 0 | 1 | 0 | 76 | 1 |
| Rayo Vallecano | 2025–26 | La Liga | 29 | 2 | 4 | 3 | 8 (Note: Appearances in UEFA Conference League) | 2 | 41 | 7 |
| Rayo Vallecano | 2026–27 | La Liga | 5 | 0 | 0 | 0 | — | | 5 | 0 |
| Rayo Vallecano | Total | | 34 | 2 | 4 | 3 | 8 | 2 | 46 | 7 |
| Career total | | | 164 | 19 | 14 | 3 | 9 | 0 | 187 | 24 |
