= Mario Domínguez (footballer, born 2004) =

Spanish footballer (born 2004)

Personal information
- Full name: Mario Domínguez Franco
- Date of birth: 10 February 2004 (age 22)
- Place of birth: Granada, Spain
- Height: 1.75 m (5 ft 9 in)
- Position: Forward

Team information
- Current team: Excelsior (on loan from Valencia)
- Number: 9

Youth career
- 2009–2010: Arenas
- 2010–2011: Gabia
- 2011–2012: Zaidín 90
- 2012–2019: Granada
- 2019–2022: Valencia

Senior career*
Years	Team	Apps	(Gls)
2022–	Valencia	5	(0)
2022–	Valencia B	73	(24)
2026–	→ Excelsior (loan)	2	(0)
- * Club domestic league appearances and goals as of 13 September 2026

Mario Domínguez Franco (born 10 February 2004), sometimes known as Domi, is a Spanish professional footballer who plays as a forward for Eredivise club Excelsior, on loan from La Liga club Valencia.

== Club career ==
A youth product of Granada CF, Domínguez moved to the youth academy of Valencia CF in 2019. In May 2022, he started training with the senior Valencia team after scoring 11 goals and 8 assists in 24 matches in his debut season with their youth side. He made his La Liga and professional debut with Valencia in a 1–1 tie with RCD Espanyol on 14 May 2022, coming on as a substitute in the 68th minute.

== Career statistics ==
=== Club ===
As of match played 10 March 2024

Appearances and goals by club, season and competition
Club	Season	League			Copa del Rey		Other		Total	
Club	Season	Division	Apps	Goals	Apps	Goals	Apps	Goals	Apps	Goals
Valencia	2021–22	La Liga	2	0	0	0	—		2	0
Valencia	2022–23	La Liga	0	0	0	0	0	0	0	0
Valencia	2023–24	La Liga	3	0	0	0	—		3	0
Valencia	Total		5	0	0	0	0	0	5	0
Valencia B	2022–23	Segunda Federación	9	0	—		0	0	9	0
Valencia B	2023–24	Segunda Federación	17	3	—		—		17	3
Valencia B	Total		26	3	—		0	0	26	3
Career total			31	3	0	0	0	0	31	3
