= Pablo Gozálbez =

Spanish footballer (born 2001)

Personal information
- Full name: Pablo Gozálbez Gilabert
- Date of birth: 30 April 2001 (age 25)
- Place of birth: Canet d'en Berenguer, Spain
- Height: 1.70 m (5 ft 7 in)
- Position: Attacking midfielder

Team information
- Current team: Arouca
- Number: 10

Youth career
- 2008–2020: Valencia

Senior career*
Years	Team	Apps	(Gls)
2020–2024	Valencia B	112	(21)
2023–2024	Valencia	5	(0)
2024–	Arouca	45	(2)
- * Club domestic league appearances and goals as of 25 May 2026

Pablo Gozálbez Gilabert (born 30 April 2001) is a Spanish professional footballer who plays as an attacking midfielder for Portuguese club FC Arouca.

== Career ==
=== Valencia ===
Born in Canet d'en Berenguer, Valencian Community, Gozálbez joined Valencia CF's youth setup in 2007, aged eight. He made his senior debut with the reserves on 5 January 2020, coming on as a second-half substitute for Sergio Moreno in a 1–0 Segunda División B away loss against UE Cornellà.

Definitely promoted to the B's ahead of the 2020–21 season, Gozálbez scored his first senior goal on 8 November 2020, but in a 2–1 loss at Orihuela CF. On 4 March 2021, already established as a starter for the B-team, he renewed his contract.

On 5 July 2023, Gozálbez further extended his link until 2025 and was called up to the pre-season with the main squad. He made his professional – and La Liga – debut on 11 August, replacing fellow youth graduate Diego López in a 2–1 away win over Sevilla FC.

=== Arouca ===
On 21 June 2024, Gozálbez moved to FC Arouca in the Primeira Liga.

== Career statistics ==
=== Club ===
As of match played 5 May 2024

Appearances and goals by club, season and competition
Club	Season	League			Copa del Rey		Other		Total	
Club	Season	Division	Apps	Goals	Apps	Goals	Apps	Goals	Apps	Goals
Valencia B	2019–20	Segunda División B	4	0	—		—		4	0
Valencia B	2020–21	Segunda División B	24	2	—		—		24	2
Valencia B	2021–22	Tercera División RFEF	34	7	—		—		34	7
Valencia B	2022–23	Segunda Federación	32	5	—		2 (Note: Appearances in 2023 Segunda Federación play-offs)	0	34	5
Valencia B	2023–24	Segunda Federación	18	7	—		—		18	7
Valencia B	Total		112	21	—		2	0	114	21
Valencia	2023–24	La Liga	5	0	3	1	—		8	1
Career total			117	21	3	1	2	0	122	22
