= Hugo González (Spanish footballer) =

Spanish footballer (born 2003)

Personal information
- Full name: Hugo González Sotos
- Date of birth: 7 February 2003 (age 23)
- Place of birth: Valencia, Spain
- Height: 1.81 m (5 ft 11 in)
- Position: Winger

Team information
- Current team: Celta
- Number: 16

Youth career
- Cracks
- 2010–2020: Valencia

Senior career*
| Years | Team | Apps | (Gls) |
| 2020–2024 | Valencia B | 85 | (23) |
| 2023–2025 | Valencia | 9 | (0) |
| 2024–2025 | → Cartagena (loan) | 17 | (0) |
| 2025 | → Celta B (loan) | 13 | (5) |
| 2025–2026 | Celta B | 30 | (14) |
| 2025– | Celta | 8 | (1) |
- * Club domestic league appearances and goals as of 8 November 2026

Hugo González Sotos (born 7 February 2003) is a Spanish professional footballer who plays as a right winger for RC Celta de Vigo.

== Career ==
=== Valencia ===
Born in Valencia, González joined Valencia CF's youth setup in 2010, from CF Cracks. He made his senior debut with the reserves on 12 January 2020, coming on as a second-half substitute in a 2–1 Segunda División B away loss to Lleida Esportiu.

On 13 May 2021, after already being regularly used for the B-side, González renewed his contract with the Che until 2023. He scored his first senior goal ten days later, netting the B's opener in a 1–1 draw at CE L'Hospitalet.

González made his first team – and La Liga – debut on 18 August 2023, replacing Hugo Duro late into a 1–0 home win over UD Las Palmas.

==== Loan to Cartagena ====
On 25 August 2024, González moved to Segunda División side FC Cartagena on loan for the season. On 3 February 2025, his loan with the Efesé was cut short.

=== Celta ===
Hours after leaving Cartagena, González joined Primera Federación side RC Celta Fortuna also in a temporary deal. On 8 July, he signed a permanent three-year deal with the side.

González made his first team debut on 30 October 2025, starting in a 2–0 Copa del Rey away win over Puerto de Vega CF, and was a key unit for Fortuna during the 2025–26 campaign, scoring a career-best 18 goals in 34 appearances (including a brace in the second leg of the promotion play-offs final against SD Ponferradina) to help the side to achieve a first-ever promotion to the second division. On 8 August 2026, he was definitely promoted to the main squad in the top tier.

González scored his first professional goal on 19 September 2026, netting the opener in a 5–0 home routing of Racing de Santander through a penalty kick.

== Career statistics ==
=== Club ===
As of match played 28 April 2024

Appearances and goals by club, season and competition
| Club | Season | League | | | Copa del Rey | | Other | | Total | |
| Club | Season | Division | Apps | Goals | Apps | Goals | Apps | Goals | Apps | Goals |
|---|---|---|---|---|---|---|---|---|---|---|
| Valencia B | 2019–20 | Segunda División B | 1 | 0 | — | | — | | 1 | 0 |
| Valencia B | 2020–21 | Segunda División B | 22 | 1 | — | | — | | 22 | 1 |
| Valencia B | 2021–22 | Tercera División RFEF | 21 | 8 | — | | — | | 21 | 8 |
| Valencia B | 2022–23 | Segunda Federación | 18 | 4 | — | | 2 (Note: Appearances in 2023 Segunda Federación play-offs) | 0 | 20 | 4 |
| Valencia B | 2023–24 | Segunda Federación | 22 | 10 | — | | — | | 22 | 10 |
| Valencia B | Total | | 84 | 23 | — | | 2 | 0 | 86 | 23 |
| Valencia | 2023–24 | La Liga | 7 | 0 | 1 | 0 | — | | 8 | 0 |
| Career total | | | 91 | 23 | 1 | 0 | 2 | 0 | 94 | 23 |
