= 2016–17 Norwich City F.C. season =

Norwich City
2016–17 season
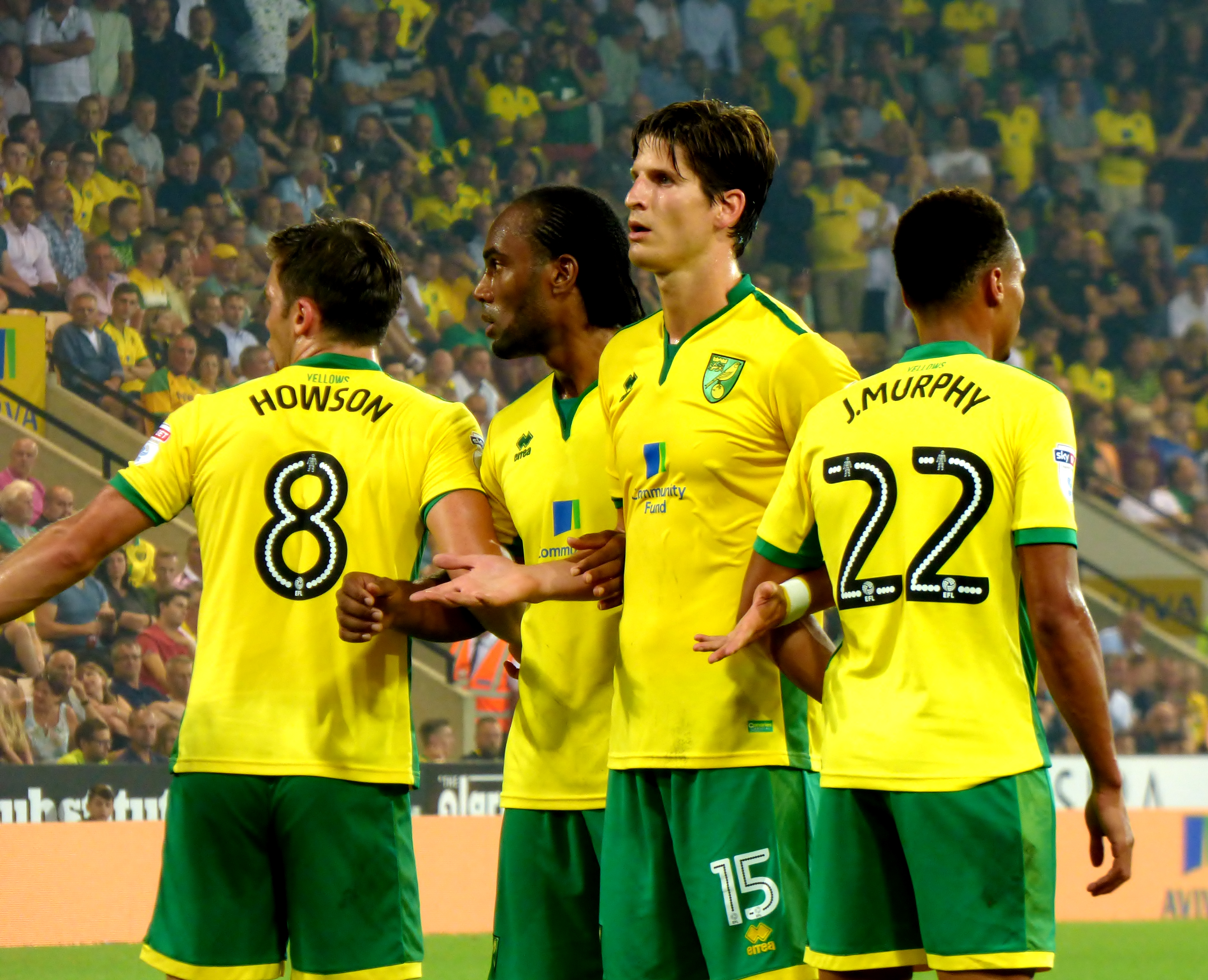
- Norwich City wall defending a Wigan Athletic free-kick, September 2016
- Chairman: Ed Balls
- Manager: Alex Neil (until 10 March); Alan Irvine (from 10 March)
- Stadium: Carrow Road
- Football League Championship: 8th
- FA Cup: Third round
- League Cup: Fourth round
- Top goalscorer: League: Cameron Jerome (16); All: Cameron Jerome (16)
- Highest home attendance: 27,107
- Lowest home attendance: 25,275
- Average home league attendance: 26,355
Home colours	Away colours	Third colours

The 2016–17 season was Norwich City's return to the Football League Championship, having been relegated from the Premier League last season. This season they participated in the Championship, FA Cup and League Cup. The Norwich City development squad also participated in the EFL Trophy. The fixture list for the season was announced on 22 June 2016, and the Championship season began on 6 August 2016. The season covered the period from 1 July 2016 to 30 June 2017.

== First-team squad ==
As of 17 January 2017

Note: Flags indicate national team as defined under FIFA eligibility rules; some limited exceptions apply. Players may hold more than one non-FIFA nationality.

No.	Pos.	Nation	Player
1	GK	ENG	John Ruddy
2	DF	SCO	Steven Whittaker
3	DF	NED	Mitchell Dijks
4	MF	SCO	Graham Dorrans
5	DF	SCO	Russell Martin (captain)
6	DF	CMR	Sébastien Bassong
7	FW	SCO	Steven Naismith
8	MF	ENG	Jonny Howson (vice-captain)
9	FW	POR	Nélson Oliveira
10	FW	ENG	Cameron Jerome
11	MF	ENG	Matt Jarvis
13	GK	ENG	Paul Jones
14	MF	IRL	Wes Hoolahan
15	DF	SUI	Timm Klose
17	MF	NED	Yanic Wildschut

No.	Pos.	Nation	Player
18	MF	COD	Youssouf Mulumbu
19	FW	NIR	Kyle Lafferty
21	MF	ENG	Alex Pritchard
22	FW	ENG	Jacob Murphy
24	DF	ENG	Ryan Bennett
25	DF	POR	Ivo Pinto
26	DF	ENG	Michael Turner
27	MF	NOR	Alexander Tettey
28	MF	ENG	James Maddison
30	FW	ENG	Carlton Morris
31	FW	ENG	Josh Murphy
33	GK	NIR	Michael McGovern
34	MF	WAL	Louis Thompson
35	MF	ENG	Ben Godfrey
37	MF	SCO	Ray Grant
—	GK	ENG	Declan Rudd

=== Out on loan ===
Note: Flags indicate national team as defined under FIFA eligibility rules; some limited exceptions apply. Players may hold more than one non-FIFA nationality.

No.	Pos.	Nation	Player
20	MF	FRA	Tony Andreu (at Dundee United until the end of the 2016–17 season)
23	DF	ENG	Harry Toffolo (at Scunthorpe United until the end of the 2016–17 season)
—	GK	ENG	Remi Matthews (at Hamilton Academical until the end of the 2016–17 season)

== Transfers ==
=== In ===
Date from	Position	Nationality	Name	From	Fee	Ref.
13 July 2016	RW	(Spain)	Sergi Canós	Liverpool	£2,550,000	
19 July 2016	GK	(Northern Ireland)	Michael McGovern	Hamilton Academical	Free transfer	
4 August 2016	GK	(England)	Paul Jones	Portsmouth	Free transfer	
4 August 2016	AM	(England)	Alex Pritchard	Tottenham Hotspur	£8,000,000	
25 August 2016	GK	(Scotland)	Jon McCracken	Hamilton Academical	Undisclosed	
30 August 2016	CF	(Portugal)	Nélson Oliveira	Benfica	Undisclosed	
31 January 2017	LW	(Netherlands)	Yanic Wildschut	Wigan Athletic	Undisclosed	

Total spending: £10,550,000 ▼

=== Out ===
Date from	Position	Nationality	Name	To	Fee	Ref.
1 July 2016	CB	(England)	Reiss Awuah	None	Released	
1 July 2016	CB	(England)	Afolabi Coker	Lewes (Note: Following Coker's release, he signed for Lewes.)	Released	
1 July 2016	CB	(Algeria)	Adel Gafaiti	MC Oran	Free transfer	
1 July 2016	RB	(England)	Reece Hall-Johnson	Maidstone United	Released	
1 July 2016	AM	(Scotland)	Cameron King	None	Released	
1 July 2016	CF	(Jamaica)	Jamar Loza	None	Released	
1 July 2016	RB	(England)	Cameron Norman	None	Released	
1 July 2016	CM	(England)	Gary O'Neil	Bristol City	Free transfer	
1 July 2016	RW	(England)	Nathan Redmond	Southampton	£10,000,000	
1 July 2016	LB	(England)	Arinse Uade	None	Released	
1 July 2016	CM	(England)	Tom Walters	Europa Point	Free transfer	
18 July 2016	GK	(England)	Jake Kean	Sheffield Wednesday (Note: Following Kean's departure, he signed for Sheffield Wednesday.)	Free	
28 July 2016	ST	(Netherlands)	Ricky van Wolfswinkel	Vitesse Arnhem	£500,000	
5 August 2016	CM	(Belgium)	Vadis Odjidja-Ofoe	Legia Warsaw	Undisclosed	
28 August 2016	GK	(England)	Marcus Beauchamp	Newport County	Free transfer	
17 January 2017	LB	(Sweden)	Martin Olsson	Swansea City	Undisclosed (Note: Fee reported as £4,000,000)	
31 January 2017	LM	(Republic of Ireland)	Robbie Brady	Burnley	Undisclosed (Note: Fee reported as £13,000,000)	
31 January 2017	RW	(Spain)	Sergi Canós	Brentford	Undisclosed	

Total incoming: £10,500,000 (reported £27,500,000) ▲

=== Loans in ===
Date from	Position	Nationality	Name	From	Date until	Ref.
31 January 2017	LB	(Netherlands)	Mitchell Dijks	Ajax	End of Season	

=== Loans out ===
Date from	Position	Nationality	Name	To	Date until	Ref.
16 July 2016	GK	(England)	Remi Matthews	Hamilton Academical	End of Season	
2 August 2016	GK	(England)	Declan Rudd	Charlton Athletic	End of Season	
31 August 2016	MF	(France)	Tony Andreu	Dundee United	End of Season	
31 August 2016	AM	(England)	James Maddison	Aberdeen	4 January 2017	
31 August 2016	LB	(England)	Harry Toffolo	Scunthorpe United	End of season (Note: On 7 January, Toffolo's loan was extended until the end of the season)	
31 January 2017	CF	(England)	Carlton Morris	Rotherham United	End of season	

== Pre-season friendlies ==
On 27 May 2016, Norwich City announced their pre-season schedule, which included a week long pre-season training camp in Burgenland, Austria. Their opponents for the two friendlies in Austria were later announced as FK Dukla Prague and Rubin Kazan. On 9 June 2016, they announced that Norwich's final pre-season friendly would be against Hannover 96.

9 July 2016 Friendly	Walsall	1–2	Norwich City	Burton upon Trent
13:00 BST	Vassell 56'	Report	Bennett 24'; Jerome 60'	Stadium: St George's Park; Attendance: 0

12 July 2016 Friendly	Lowestoft Town	P–P	Norwich City	Lowestoft
19:30 BST		Report		Stadium: Crown Meadow

16 July 2016 Friendly (120 mins)	Peterborough United	0–3	Norwich City	Peterborough
15:00 BST		Report	Jo. Murphy 48'; Jerome 90+7'; Ja. Murphy 90+11'	Stadium: London Road Stadium

20 July 2016 Friendly	FK Dukla Prague	3–1	Norwich City	Kumberg, Austria
18:00 BST	Čajić 28'; Albiach 66'; Olayinka 88'	Report	Jo. Murphy 88'	Stadium: Kumberg Stadium

23 July 2016 Friendly	Rubin Kazan	1–2	Norwich City	Stegersbach, Austria
13:00 BST	Tkachuk 14'	Report	Jerome 1'; Naismith 62'	Stadium: Stadion Stegersbach

26 July 2016 Friendly	Norwich City	3–0	Coventry City	Norwich
19:30 BST	Hoolahan 9'; Jo. Murphy 66'; Ja. Murphy 86'	Report		Stadium: Carrow Road; Attendance: 7,602

30 July 2016 Friendly	Norwich City	2–3	Hannover 96	Norwich
15:00 BST	Hoolahan 52', 60'	Report	Sobiech 4', 50'; Maier 11'	Stadium: Carrow Road

== Competitions ==
=== Overview ===
Competition	First match	Last match	Starting round	Final position	Record							
Competition	First match	Last match	Starting round	Final position	Pld	W	D	L	GF	GA	GD	Win %
EFL Championship	6 August 2016	7 May 2017	Matchday 1	8th	46	20	10	16	85	69	+16	43.48
FA Cup	7 January 2017	18 January 2017	Third round	Third round	2	0	1	1	2	3	−1	0.00
EFL Cup	23 August 2016	25 October 2016	First round	Third round	3	2	1	0	10	3	+7	66.67
Total					51	22	12	17	97	75	+22	43.14

Source: Soccerway

=== Championship ===
==== League table ====
Pos	Team	Pld	W	D	L	GF	GA	GD	Pts	Promotion, qualification or relegation
6	Fulham	46	22	14	10	85	57	+28	80	Qualification for the Championship play-offs (Note: Four teams play for one spot and promotion to the Premier League.)
7	Leeds United	46	22	9	15	61	47	+14	75	
8	Norwich City	46	20	10	16	85	69	+16	70	
9	Derby County	46	18	13	15	54	50	+4	67	
10	Brentford	46	18	10	18	75	65	+10	64	

Source: English Football League, Soccerway
Rules for classification: 1) Points; 2) Goal difference; 3) Number of goals scored; 4) Points in head-to-head matches; 5) Goal difference in head-to-head matches; 6) Goals scored in head-to-head matches; 7) Play-off.

==== Results by matchday ====
Matchday	1	2	3	4	5	6	7	8	9	10	11	12	13	14	15	16	17	18	19	20	21	22	23	24	25	26	27	28	29	30	31	32	33	34	35	36	37	38	39	40	41	42	43	44	45	46
Ground	A	H	H	A	A	H	H	A	H	A	A	H	A	H	A	H	A	A	H	A	H	H	A	A	H	A	H	H	A	A	H	H	A	H	A	A	H	H	A	A	H	H	A	H	A	H
Result	W	D	W	D	L	W	W	W	W	L	W	W	D	L	L	L	L	L	W	L	W	L	L	D	W	L	W	W	W	D	W	D	L	D	L	D	D	W	L	L	W	L	W	W	D	W
Position	1	5	2	4	12	5	4	2	1	2	2	1	2	4	4	5	6	8	7	8	8	9	12	12	9	11	10	8	7	7	7	7	7	8	8	8	9	8	9	10	10	10	8	8	8	8

A = Away; H = Home; W = Win; D = Draw; L = Loss

==== Results summary ====
Overall								Home						Away					
Pld	W	D	L	GF	GA	GD	Pts	W	D	L	GF	GA	GD	W	D	L	GF	GA	GD
46	20	10	16	85	69	+16	70	15	4	4	55	22	+33	5	6	12	30	47	−17

==== Matches ====
The Championship fixture list was released on 22 June 2016. Norwich's first game was away to Blackburn Rovers.

6 August 2016 1	Blackburn Rovers	1–4	Norwich City	Blackburn
15:00 BST	Bennett (yellow card) 16'; Stokes 67'; Greer (yellow card) 76'	Report	Jacob Murphy 12'; Hoolahan 17'; Jerome 25' (yellow card) 69'; Naismith 58'	Stadium: Ewood Park; Attendance: 12,641; Referee: Tony Harrington

13 August 2016 2	Norwich City	0–0	Sheffield Wednesday	Norwich
17:30 BST	Bennett (yellow card) 55'	Report	Abdi (yellow card) 64'	Stadium: Carrow Road; Attendance: 26,236; Referee: Andy Woolmer

16 August 2016 3	Norwich City	1–0	Bristol City	Norwich
19:45 BST	Howson 38'; Pinto (yellow card) 50'; Tettey (yellow card) 90'	Report		Stadium: Carrow Road; Attendance: 26,297; Referee: Stuart Attwell

21 August 2016 4	Ipswich Town	1–1	Norwich City	Ipswich
12:00 BST	Knudsen 45+1'	Report	Jerome 26'; Tettey (yellow card) 64'	Stadium: Portman Road; Attendance: 23,350; Referee: David Coote

27 August 2016 5	Birmingham City	3–0	Norwich City	Birmingham
15:00 BST	Davis 22'; Donaldson 68' (pen.), 83'	Report		Stadium: St Andrew's; Attendance: 16,295; Referee: Darren Bond

10 September 2016 6	Norwich City	3–2	Cardiff City	Norwich
15:00 BST	Jerome 16'; Klose (yellow card) 50'; Tettey (yellow card) 55'; Howson 59'; Josh Murphy 90'	Report	Connolly (yellow card) 45'; Pilkington 86', 90' (yellow card) 90'	Stadium: Carrow Road; Attendance: 25,519; Referee: Oliver Langford

13 September 2016 7	Norwich City	2–1	Wigan Athletic	Norwich
19:45 BST	Jacob Murphy 3', 11'; Howson (yellow card) 63'; Martin (yellow card) 77'	Report	MacDonald (yellow card) 17'; Gilbey (yellow card) 27'; Power (yellow card) 55'; Jordi Gómez 72'	Stadium: Carrow Road; Attendance: 25,992; Referee: Keith Stroud

17 September 2016 8	Nottingham Forest	1–2	Norwich City	West Bridgford
15:00 BST	Vellios 40'; Mills (yellow card) 73'; Kasami (yellow card) 86'	Report	Howson 52'; Dorrans 66' (yellow card) 72'	Stadium: City Ground; Attendance: 20,323; Referee: Chris Kavanagh

24 September 2016 9	Norwich City	3–1	Burton Albion	Norwich
15:00 BST	Olsson 29', (yellow card) 62'; Jacob Murphy 47'; Hoolahan (yellow card) 83'; Pinto 89'	Report	Naylor (yellow card) 33'; Akins 46'; Ward (yellow card) 50'; Flanagan (yellow card) 63' (yellow-red card) 76'	Stadium: Carrow Road; Attendance: 26,104; Referee: Jeremy Simpson

28 September 2016 10	Newcastle United	4–3	Norwich City	Newcastle upon Tyne
19:45 BST	Gayle 24', 71', 90'; Ritchie (yellow card) 40'; Dummett (yellow card) 43'; Mitrovic (yellow card) 73'; Lascelles (yellow card) 78'; Gouffran 90'	Report	Dorrans 44' (pen.) (yellow card) 60'; Brady (yellow card) 45'; Jerome 52' (yellow card) 78'; Jacob Murphy 69'; Olsson (yellow card) 74'	Stadium: St James' Park; Attendance: 48,236; Referee: Peter Bankes

1 October 2016 11	Wolverhampton Wanderers	1–2	Norwich City	Wolverhampton
17:30 BST	Costa (yellow card) 46'; Edwards (yellow card) 79' (goal) 80'; Saïss (yellow card) 85'	Report	Jerome 2'; Hoolahan (yellow card) 12'; Dorrans (yellow card) 26'; Tettey (yellow card) 65'; Brady 73'	Stadium: Molineux Stadium; Attendance: 18,793; Referee: Geoff Eltringham

15 October 2016 12	Norwich City	3–1	Rotherham United	Norwich
15:00 BST	Hoolahan 17'; Jerome 65'; Naismith 89'	Report	Blackstock 74'; Isaiah Brown (yellow card) 82'	Stadium: Carrow Road; Attendance: 26,813; Referee: James Adcock

18 October 2016 13	Fulham	2–2	Norwich City	Fulham
19:45 BST	Aluko (yellow card) 39'; Malone (yellow card) 40'; Parker (yellow card) 41'; Johansen 55' (yellow card) 87'; C. Martin 69'	Report	Dorrans 17' (pen.), 41' (pen.) (yellow card) 87'; Jerome (yellow card) 43'; R. Martin (yellow card) 87'	Stadium: Craven Cottage; Attendance: 17,082; Referee: James Linington

22 October 2016 14	Norwich City	0–1	Preston North End	Norwich
15:00 BST	Klose (yellow card) 57'	Report	Cunningham (yellow card) 68'; Baptiste 75'	Stadium: Carrow Road; Attendance: 26,239; Referee: Steve Martin

29 October 2016 15	Brighton & Hove Albion	5–0	Norwich City	Falmer
15:00 BST	Murray 6', 60', 73' (yellow card) 27'; Dunk 64'; Knockaert 84'	Report	Olsson (yellow card) 27'; Pritchard (yellow card) 49'; Tettey (yellow card) 71'	Stadium: Falmer Stadium; Attendance: 29,469; Referee: Andy Madley

5 November 2016 16	Norwich City	2–3	Leeds United	Norwich
15:00 GMT	Brady 24'; Hoolahan (yellow card) 39'; Jerome (yellow card) 69'; Lafferty 88'	Report	Jansson 57' (yellow card) 57'; Wood 74'; Phillips (yellow card) 90'; Ronaldo Vieira 90'	Stadium: Carrow Road; Attendance: 26,903; Referee: Andrew Davies

19 November 2016 17	Queens Park Rangers	2–1	Norwich City	Shepherd's Bush
15:00 GMT	Washington 21'; Polter 27'; Lynch (yellow card) 80'	Report	Olsson (red card) 1'; Tettey (yellow card) 2'; Naismith (yellow card) 37' (goal) 78'; Dorrans (yellow card) 45'	Stadium: Loftus Road; Attendance: 17,187; Referee: Scott Duncan

26 November 2016 18	Derby County	1–0	Norwich City	Derby
15:00 GMT	Johnson 65'; Pearce (yellow card) 86'; Weimann (yellow card) 90'	Report	Lafferty (yellow card) 78'; Martin (yellow card) 85'	Stadium: Pride Park Stadium; Attendance: 29,311; Referee: Simon Hooper

3 December 2016 19	Norwich City	5–0	Brentford	Norwich
15:00 GMT	Jacob Murphy 6'; Dorrans 18'; Naismith (yellow card) 44'; Brady 59'; Oliveira 79'; Pritchard 88'	Report		Stadium: Carrow Road; Attendance: 26,076; Referee: Geoff Eltringham

10 December 2016 20	Barnsley	2–1	Norwich City	Barnsley
15:00 GMT	Bradshaw 12'; Hourihane 40'	Report	Oliveira 52'	Stadium: Oakwell; Attendance: 12,306; Referee: Andy Woolmer

13 December 2016 21	Norwich City	1–0	Aston Villa	Norwich
19:45 GMT	Brady (yellow card) 26'; Oliveira 62'	Report		Stadium: Carrow Road; Attendance: 26,044; Referee: Tim Robinson

16 December 2016 22	Norwich City	1–2	Huddersfield Town	Norwich
19:45 GMT	Howson 6'; Pinto (yellow card) 45'; Dorrans (yellow card) 51'	Report	Kachunga 5', 40'; Wells (yellow card) 71'; Mooy (yellow card) 87'	Stadium: Carrow Road; Attendance: 25,275; Referee: James Linington

26 December 2016 23	Reading	3–1	Norwich City	Reading
15:00 GMT	van den Berg (yellow card) 29'; Kermorgant 37'; McCleary 68'; Harriott 90'	Report	Tettey (yellow card) 34'; Pinto (yellow card) 37'; Oliveira 60'; Howson (red card) 67'	Stadium: Madejski Stadium; Attendance: 21,180; Referee: Andy Davies

31 December 2016 24	Brentford	0–0	Norwich City	Brentford
17:30 GMT	McEachran (yellow card) 32'; Barbet (yellow card) 87'; Dean (yellow card) 90+3'	Report	Brady (red card) 80'; Tettey (yellow card) 90+5'	Stadium: Griffin Park; Attendance: 9,377; Referee: Oliver Langford

2 January 2017 25	Norwich City	3–0	Derby County	Norwich
15:00 GMT	Oliveira 15', 78', 80'; Pinto (yellow card) 81'	Report	Keogh (yellow card) 41'; Butterfield (red card) 66'; Carson (yellow card) 67'	Stadium: Carrow Road; Attendance: 26,422; Referee: Darren Bond

14 January 2017 26	Rotherham United	2–1	Norwich City	Rotherham
15:00 GMT	Yates 7'; Wood (yellow card) 20'; Vaulks (yellow card) 41'; Adeyemi 55'; Price (yellow card) 88'	Report	Oliveira (red card) 18'; Hoolahan (yellow card) 30'; Naismith (yellow card) 44'; Jerome (yellow card) 49' (goal) 51'	Stadium: New York Stadium; Attendance: 10,000; Referee: Geoff Eltringham

21 January 2017 27	Norwich City	3–1	Wolverhampton Wanderers	Norwich
15:00 GMT	Naismith 13'; Hoolahan (yellow card) 73'; Brady 75' (pen.); Howson 90+1'	Report	Costa 57' (pen.); Edwards (yellow card) 70'; Ikeme (red card) 72'; Doherty (yellow card) 74'	Stadium: Carrow Road; Attendance: 26,303; Referee: David Coote

28 January 2017 28	Norwich City	2–0	Birmingham City	Norwich
15:00 GMT	Jerome 15'; Howson (yellow card) 26'; Klose 43'	Report	Grounds (yellow card) 63'; Shotton (yellow card) 87'	Stadium: Carrow Road; Attendance: 25,678; Referee: Simon Hooper

4 February 2017 29	Cardiff City	0–1	Norwich City	Cardiff
15:00 GMT	Connolly (yellow card) 74'; Healey (yellow card) 76'	Report	Jerome 40' (yellow card) 49'; Tettey (yellow card) 70'; Howson (yellow card) 77'	Stadium: Cardiff City Stadium; Attendance: 15,301; Referee: Chris Kavanagh

7 February 2017 30	Wigan Athletic	2–2	Norwich City	Wigan
19:45 GMT	Grigg (yellow card) 48'; Bogle 62', 68'; Morsy (yellow card) 90'	Report	Oliveira 40'; Martin (yellow card) 48'; Dijks 73'; Pinto (yellow card) 86'	Stadium: DW Stadium; Attendance: 10,193; Referee: Peter Bankes

11 February 2017 31	Norwich City	5–1	Nottingham Forest	Norwich
15:00 GMT	Howson 10'; Josh Murphy 16'; Hoolahan 18'; Pritchard 61', 89'; Whittaker (yellow card) 73'	Report	Lichaj (yellow card) 45+2' (yellow-red card) 70'; Hobbs (yellow card) 50'; Tshibola (yellow card) 57'; McCormack 75'	Stadium: Carrow Road; Attendance: 26,861; Referee: Scott Duncan

14 February 2017 32	Norwich City	2–2	Newcastle United	Norwich
19:45 GMT	Jacob Murphy 12'; Jerome 16'; Dijks (yellow card) 82'	Report	Pérez 1'; Colback (yellow card) 27'; Lascelles (yellow card) 47' (goal) 80'	Stadium: Carrow Road; Attendance: 26,841; Referee: Andrew Madley

18 February 2017 33	Burton Albion	2–1	Norwich City	Burton upon Trent
15:00 GMT	Woodrow 25'; Kightly 56'	Report	Jerome 52' (yellow card) 59'	Stadium: Pirelli Stadium; Attendance: 5,263; Referee: Lee Probert

26 February 2017 34	Norwich City	1–1	Ipswich Town	Norwich
12:00 GMT	Jacob Murphy 68'	Report	Sears (yellow card) 58'; Knudsen 62'; Spence (yellow card) 86'	Stadium: Carrow Road; Attendance: 27,107; Referee: Oliver Langford

4 March 2017 35	Sheffield Wednesday	5–1	Norwich City	Sheffield
15:00 GMT	Wallace 15'; Rhodes 22', 54'; Fox 41'; Forestieri 66'	Report	Jerome 38'; Klose (yellow card) 46'; Naismith (yellow card) 56'	Stadium: Hillsborough Stadium; Attendance: 28,178; Referee: Andy Davies

7 March 2017 36	Bristol City	1–1	Norwich City	Bristol
15:00 GMT	Smith (yellow card) 69'; Wright 78'	Report	Wildschut 39'; Martin (yellow card) 77'; Dijks (yellow card) 79'	Stadium: Ashton Gate Stadium; Attendance: 17,035; Referee: Steve Martin

11 March 2017 37	Norwich City	2–2	Blackburn Rovers	Norwich
15:00 GMT	Jerome 19', 81'; Dijks (red card) 21'; Hoolahan (yellow card) 43'; Whittaker (yellow card) 62'; Tettey (yellow card) 88'	Report	Lowe (yellow card) 56'; João 73', 78'; Lenihan (yellow card) 76'; Akpan (yellow card) 90+4'	Stadium: Carrow Road; Attendance: 26,224; Referee: Simon Hooper

18 March 2017 38	Norwich City	2–0	Barnsley	Norwich
15:00 GMT	Jacob Murphy 44'; Pinto (yellow card) 62'; MacDonald 71' (o.g.)	Report		Stadium: Carrow Road; Attendance: 26,105; Referee: Darren Bond

1 April 2017 39	Aston Villa	2–0	Norwich City	Birmingham
15:00 BST	Kodjia 25', 87'; Lansbury (yellow card) 51'	Report	Pinto (yellow card) 65' (yellow-red card) 80'	Stadium: Villa Park; Attendance: 32,605; Referee: Jeremy Simpson

5 April 2017 40	Huddersfield Town	3–0	Norwich City	Huddersfield
19:45 BST	Hefele (yellow card) 42'; Kachunga 66'; Mooy 70'; Wells 73'	Report	Tettey (yellow card) 10'; Martin (yellow card) 36'; Howson (yellow card) 78'	Stadium: John Smith's Stadium; Attendance: 18,706; Referee: Christopher Kavanagh

8 April 2017 41	Norwich City	7–1	Reading	Norwich
15:00 BST	Oliveira 3' (pen.); Hoolahan 15', 41'; Pritchard 26', 35'; Martin 31'; Jacob Murphy (yellow card) 88'; Jerome 89'	Report	Kermorgant 39'; Moore (yellow card) 59'; Obita (yellow card) 88'	Stadium: Carrow Road; Attendance: 26,163; Referee: James Linington

14 April 2017 42	Norwich City	1–3	Fulham	Norwich
15:00 BST	Hoolahan (yellow card) 28'; Howson (yellow card) 46'; Jerome (yellow card) 58' (goal) 76'; Pinto (yellow card) 77'	Report	Johansen 4'; Martin (red card) 45+3'; Cairney 48' (pen.); Malone (yellow card) 59'; Bettinelli (yellow card) 68'; Piazon (yellow card) 85'; Ayité 89'	Stadium: Carrow Road; Attendance: 27,023; Referee: Andy Madley

17 April 2017 43	Preston North End	1–3	Norwich City	Preston
15:00 BST	Spurr 67'	Report	Dorrans 28'; Josh Murphy 40' (yellow card) 81'; Maddison 90+2'	Stadium: Deepdale Stadium; Attendance: 11,373; Referee: James Adcock

21 April 2017 44	Norwich City	2–0	Brighton & Hove Albion	Norwich
19:45 BST	Stockdale 17', 38' (o.g.); Dorrans (yellow card) 18'	Report	Knockaert (yellow card) 18'	Stadium: Carrow Road; Attendance: 26,932; Referee: Tim Robinson

29 April 2017 45	Leeds United	3–3	Norwich City	Leeds
15:00 BST	Wood 45+1'; Bartley 49'; Jansson (yellow card) 63'; Berardi (yellow card) 77'; Hernández 78'	Report	Naismith 28' (red card) 89'; Oliveira 34', 45'; Dorrans (yellow card) 77'	Stadium: Elland Road; Attendance: 34,292; Referee: Tony Harrington

7 May 2017 46	Norwich City	4–0	Queens Park Rangers	Norwich
12:00 BST	Hoolahan 22', 90+1'; Pritchard 60'; Josh Murphy 85'	Report		Stadium: Carrow Road; Attendance: 27,005; Referee: Tim Robinson

=== FA Cup ===
7 January 2017 Third round	Norwich City	2–2	Southampton	Norwich
15:00 GMT	Whittaker 52' (pen.); Tettey (yellow card) 57'; Naismith 90'	Report	van Dijk 38'; Sims (yellow card) 50'; Yoshida 67'	Stadium: Carrow Road; Attendance: 12,479; Referee: Chris Kavanagh

18 January 2017 Replay	Southampton	1–0	Norwich City	Southampton
19:45 GMT	Long 90+2'	Report		Stadium: St Mary's Stadium; Attendance: 13,517; Referee: Jonathan Moss

=== EFL Cup ===
23 August 2016 Second round	Norwich City	6–1	Coventry City	Norwich
19:45 BST	Lafferty 25'; Canós 36', 80'; Thompson (yellow card) 42'; Martin 58'; Jacob Murphy 63'; Godfrey 86'	Report	Lameiras 56' (pen.)	Stadium: Carrow Road; Attendance: 10,510; Referee: David Webb

20 September 2016 Third round	Everton	0–2	Norwich City	Liverpool
19:45 BST		Report	Naismith 41'; Mulumbu (yellow card) 50'; Ruddy (yellow card) 57'; Josh Murphy 74'; Lafferty (yellow card) 86'	Stadium: Goodison Park; Attendance: 29,550; Referee: Andy Madley

25 October 2016 Fourth round	Leeds United	2–2 (a.e.t.) (3–2 p)	Norwich City	Leeds
19:45 BST	Bartley (yellow card) 40'; Antonsson 43'; Mowatt (yellow card) 45'; Wood 109'; Silvestri (yellow card) 110'	Report	Pritchard 14'; Bennett (yellow card) 43'; Brady (yellow card) 79'; Oliveira 99'; Sergi Canós (yellow card) 113'	Stadium: Elland Road; Attendance: 22,222; Referee: Andy Woolmer
	Penalties
	Wood (penalty scored); Roofe (penalty scored); Phillips (penalty missed); Grimes (penalty missed); Ronaldo Vieira (penalty scored)		Dorrans (penalty scored); Pritchard (penalty missed); Naismith (penalty missed); Oliveira (penalty scored); Brady (penalty missed)

== Statistics ==
=== Appearances, goals and cards ===
No.	Pos	Player	Championship			FA Cup			EFL Cup			Total			Discipline	
No.	Pos	Player	Starts	Sub	Goals	Starts	Sub	Goals	Starts	Sub	Goals	Starts	Sub	Goals	Yellow card	Red card
1	GK	John Ruddy	27	0	0	—	—	—	2	0	0	29	0	0	1	0
2	RB	Steven Whittaker	7	5	0	1	0	1	2	0	0	10	5	1	2	0
3	DF	Mitchell Dijks	15	0	1	—	—	—	—	—	—	15	0	1	2	1
4	MF	Graham Dorrans	22	1	6	—	—	—	0	1	0	22	2	6	9	0
5	CB	Russell Martin	36	1	1	2	0	0	1	0	1	39	1	2	6	0
6	CB	Sébastien Bassong	8	1	0	1	0	0	3	0	0	12	1	0	0	0
7	CAM	Steven Naismith	21	9	5	1	0	1	2	0	1	24	9	7	6	1
8	CM	Jonny Howson	37	1	6	1	0	0	—	—	—	38	1	6	7	1
9	ST	Nélson Oliveira	16	12	11	—	—	—	2	0	1	18	12	12	0	1
10	ST	Cameron Jerome	31	9	16	1	0	0	—	—	—	32	9	16	7	0
11	LM	Matt Jarvis	—	—	—	—	—	—	—	—	—	0	0	0	0	0
13	GK	Paul Jones	—	—	—	—	—	—	1	0	0	1	0	0	0	0
14	CAM	Wes Hoolahan	30	3	7	—	—	—	—	—	—	30	3	7	8	0
15	CB	Timm Klose	31	1	1	2	0	0	—	—	—	33	1	1	3	0
17	MF	Yanic Wildschut	6	3	1	—	—	—	—	—	—	6	3	1	0	0
18	MF	Youssouf Mulumbu	7	6	0	—	—	—	1	1	0	8	7	0	2	0
19	ST	Kyle Lafferty	0	12	1	1	1	0	1	1	1	2	14	2	2	0
21	MF	Alex Pritchard	19	11	6	2	0	0	2	0	1	23	11	7	1	0
22	RM	Jacob Murphy	32	5	9	0	2	0	1	0	1	33	7	10	0	0
24	CB	Ryan Bennett	24	9	0	1	1	0	2	0	0	27	10	0	2	0
25	RB	Ivo Pinto	37	0	1	1	0	0	—	—	—	38	0	1	8	1
26	CB	Michael Turner	—	—	—	—	—	—	0	2	0	0	2	0	0	0
27	CDM	Alexander Tettey	33	2	0	1	0	0	1	0	0	35	2	0	12	0
28	MF	James Maddison	0	3	1	—	—	—	1	0	0	1	3	1	0	0
30	ST	Carlton Morris	—	—	—	—	—	—	—	—	—	0	0	0	0	0
31	LM	Josh Murphy	8	18	4	2	0	0	2	1	1	12	19	5	1	0
33	GK	Michael McGovern	19	1	0	2	0	0	—	—	—	21	1	0	0	0
34	MF	Louis Thompson	1	2	0	—	—	—	3	0	0	4	2	0	1	0
35	MF	Ben Godfrey	0	2	0	1	0	0	1	2	1	2	4	1	0	0
37	MF	Ray Grant	—	—	—	0	1	0	—	—	—	0	1	0	0	0
38	DF	Louis Ramsay	—	—	—	—	—	—	—	—	—	0	0	0	0	0
43	DF	Glen Middleton	—	—	—	—	—	—	—	—	—	0	0	0	0	0
—	GK	Declan Rudd	—	—	—	—	—	—	—	—	—	0	0	0	0	0
Players out on loan:
20	MF	Tony Andreu	—	—	—	—	—	—	1	0	0	1	0	0	0	0
23	LB	Harry Toffolo	—	—	—	—	—	—	1	0	0	1	0	0	0	0
—	GK	Remi Matthews	—	—	—	—	—	—	—	—	—	0	0	0	0	0
Players no longer at the club:
3	LB	Martin Olsson	16	3	1	1	0	0	—	—	—	17	3	1	3	1
12	MF	Robbie Brady	22	1	4	1	0	0	2	0	0	25	1	4	3	1
17	MF	Sergi Canós	1	2	0	0	1	0	1	1	2	2	4	2	1	0

=== Goalscorers ===
Rank	Pos.	Player	Championship	FA Cup	EFL Cup	Total
1	ST	Cameron Jerome	16	0	0	16
2	ST	Nélson Oliveira	11	0	1	12
3	RM	Jacob Murphy	9	0	1	10
4	CAM	Wes Hoolahan	7	0	0	7
4	MF	Alex Pritchard	6	0	1	7
4	CAM	Steven Naismith	5	1	1	7
7	MF	Jonny Howson	6	0	0	6
7	MF	Graham Dorrans	6	0	0	6
9	LM	Josh Murphy	4	0	1	5
10	MF	Robbie Brady	4	0	0	4
11	ST	Kyle Lafferty	1	0	1	2
11	DF	Russell Martin	1	0	1	2
11	MF	Sergi Canós	0	0	2	2
14	DF	Martin Olsson	1	0	0	1
14	DF	Ivo Pinto	1	0	0	1
14	DF	Timm Klose	1	0	0	1
14	DF	Mitchell Dijks	1	0	0	1
14	MF	Yanic Wildschut	1	0	0	1
14	MF	James Maddison	1	0	0	1
14	DF	Steven Whittaker	0	1	0	1
14	MF	Ben Godfrey	0	0	1	1
Own goals			3	0	0	3
Totals			85	2	10	97
