= Vicent Abril =

Spanish footballer (born 2003)

Personal information
- Full name: Vicent Abril Sanz
- Date of birth: 15 February 2005 (age 21)
- Place of birth: Castelló, Spain
- Height: 1.87 m (6 ft 2 in)
- Position: Goalkeeper

Team information
- Current team: Gimnàstic (on loan from Valencia)
- Number: 13

Youth career
- 2013–2015: Castelló de la Ribera
- 2015–2016: Alzira
- 2016–2024: Valencia

Senior career*
Years	Team	Apps	(Gls)
2024–	Valencia B	39	(0)
2026–	Gimnàstic	0	(0)

International career
2019–2020	Spain U15	2	(0)
2022–2023	Spain U18	4	(0)
2025	Spain U20	1	(0)
- * Club domestic league appearances and goals as of 9 June 2026

Vicent Abril Sanz (born 15 February 2005) is a Spanish professional footballer who plays as a goalkeeper for Gimnàstic de Tarragona, on loan from Valencia CF.

== Club career ==
Born in Castelló, Valencian Community, Abril joined Valencia CF's youth sides in 2016, from UD Alzira. He finished his formation in 2024, and made his senior debut with the reserves on 1 September of that year, starting in a 1–0 Segunda Federación home win over UE Olot.

On 5 August 2025, after being a first-choice for Mestalla ahead of Nil Ruiz and Raúl Jiménez, Abril renewed his contract with the Che until 2028. On 26 August 2026, he moved to Primera Federación side Gimnàstic de Tarragona on a one-year loan deal.

== International career ==
Abril received call-ups for Spain from the under-15 up until the under-21 team. With the under-20s, he was a part of the squad for the 2025 FIFA U-20 World Cup along with Valencia teammate Jiménez, but both acted a backup to Fran González during the competition.

== Personal life ==
Abril's twin brother Marc is also a footballer. A midfielder, both played together in the youth sides of Valencia.
