= Sergi Canós =

Spanish footballer (born 1997)

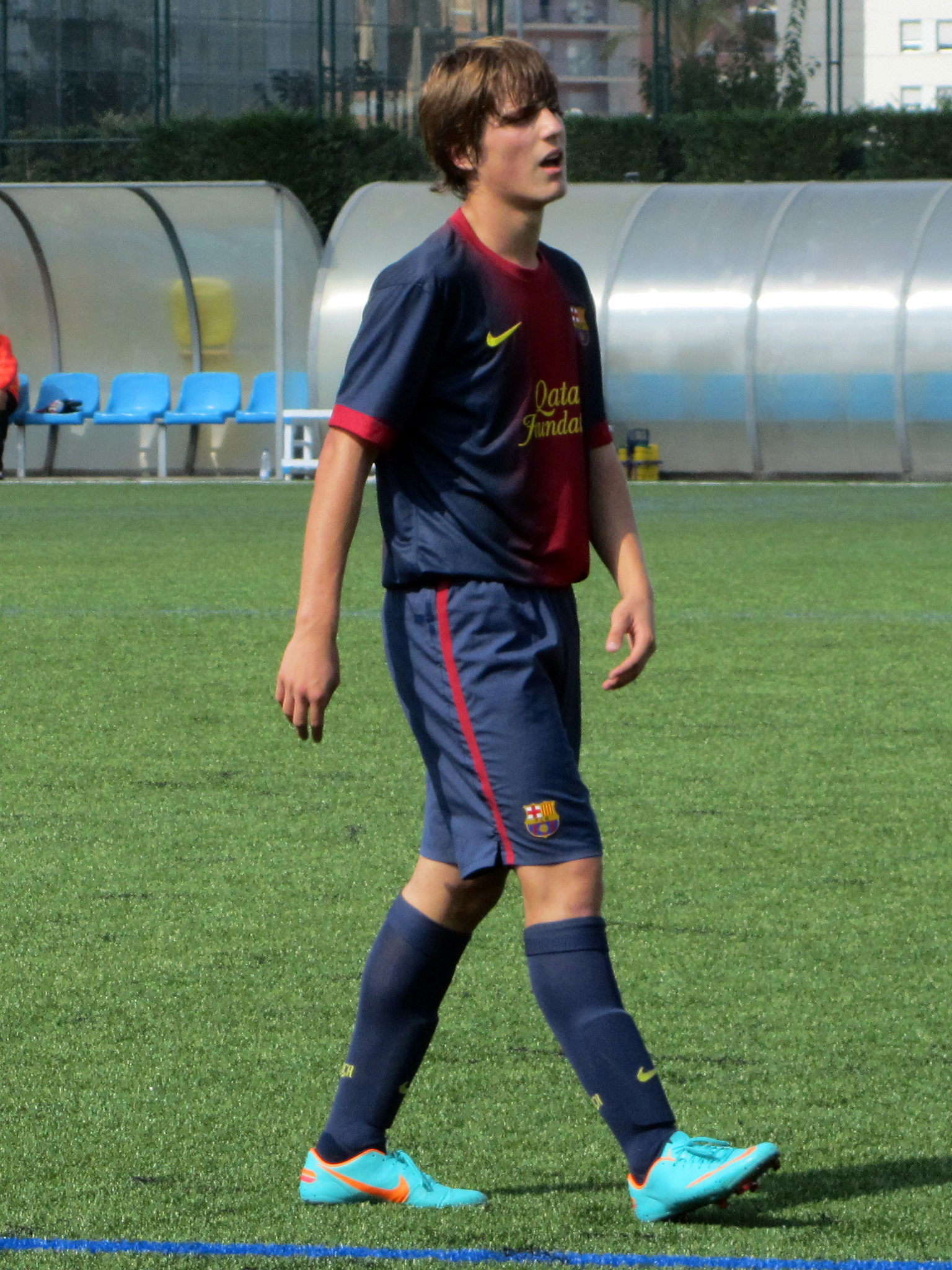
- Canós playing for Barcelona in 2012

Personal information
- Full name: Sergi Canós Tenés
- Date of birth: 2 February 1997 (age 29)
- Place of birth: Nules, Spain
- Height: 1.77 m (5 ft 10 in)
- Position: Winger

Team information
- Current team: Valencia

Youth career
- Nules
- CD Castellón
- Espanyol
- 2010–2013: Barcelona
- 2013–2015: Liverpool

Senior career*
Years	Team	Apps	(Gls)
2015–2016	Liverpool	1	(0)
2015–2016	→ Brentford (loan)	38	(7)
2016–2017	Norwich City	3	(0)
2017–2023	Brentford	187	(26)
2023	→ Olympiacos (loan)	8	(4)
2023–	Valencia	44	(1)
2025–2026	→ Valladolid (loan)	21	(2)

International career
2012	Spain U15		
2013	Spain U16	2	(0)
2013–2014	Spain U17	10	(5)
2016	Spain U19	4	(0)
- * Club domestic league appearances and goals as of 22:07, 6 April 2026 (UTC)

Sergi Canós Tenés (born 2 February 1997) is a Spanish professional footballer who plays as winger for La Liga club Valencia CF.

Canós began his career in the Barcelona Academy and transferred to the Liverpool Academy in 2013. A fringe player at both Liverpool and his next club Norwich City, Canós transferred to Brentford in 2017, for whom he had previously played on loan from Liverpool during the 2015–16 season. By the time he returned to his native Spain to join Valencia in 2023, he had made more than 240 appearances for Brentford.

Canós represented Spain between U15 and U19 level and has been described as a "quick attacking player". He is also a utility player, being adept as a winger, attacking midfielder, forward or right wing back.

== Club career ==
=== Early career ===
Born in Nules, Castellón, Valencian Community, Canós began his career in the youth systems at Nules, CD Castellón and Espanyol, before rejecting attention from Valencia, Villarreal and Atlético Madrid to join Barcelona's academy in 2010. Able to play as a winger or forward, he left La Masia in 2013.

=== Liverpool ===
==== 2013–2015 ====
Canós moved to England to sign for Premier League club Liverpool at the age of 16 in 2013. After receiving international clearance in November 2013, he progressed through the U18 team during the 2013–14 season to make his debut for the club's reserves in August 2014. Canós appeared in every match of Liverpool's 2014–15 UEFA Youth League campaign and scored one goal.

==== 2015–16 season and loan to Brentford ====
On 31 August 2015, Canós joined Championship club Brentford on a loan which was later extended until the end of the 2015–16 season. He made the first senior appearance of his career as a late substitute for Philipp Hofmann in a 1–1 draw with Leeds United at Elland Road on 12 September. He made regular substitute appearances and scored the first senior goal of his career versus Nottingham Forest on 21 November, scoring within three minutes after coming on for John Swift. After the appointment of Dean Smith as manager in December, Canós broke into the starting lineup and the day after extending his loan, he scored Brentford's Goal of the Season versus Reading on 28 December. He scored four further goals during the second half of the season and finished with seven goals from 39 appearances.

Canós returned to Anfield in time to be included in Jürgen Klopp's squad for the final match of the 2015–16 Premier League season versus West Bromwich Albion. He made his only senior appearance for Liverpool as a late substitute for Sheyi Ojo in the 1–1 draw. Canós departed the club on 12 July 2016.

=== Norwich City ===
On 13 July 2016, Canós signed a four-year contract with Championship club Norwich City for an undisclosed fee, reported to be an initial £2.5 million, which could have risen to £4.5 million. He was largely out of favour at Carrow Road and featured mainly in cup competitions, scoring his first goals for the club with a brace in a 6–1 EFL Cup second round thrashing of Coventry City on 23 August 2016. Canós scored for the U23 team in a 5–0 EFL Trophy group stage win over Barnet on 4 October, but failed to break into the squad for league matches and left the club on 31 January 2017, after having made just 9 appearances during the first half of the 2016–17 season.

=== Return to Brentford ===
==== 2016–17 season ====
On 31 January 2017, Canós rejoined Brentford on 4 1/2-year contract, with an option for a further year. The undisclosed fee (reported to be £2,500,000, rising to £4,500,000) made him the club's then-record signing. Canós made his second Brentford debut five days later, as a 69th-minute substitute for Florian Jozefzoon during a 3–3 draw with Brighton & Hove Albion. He scored the first goals since his return to Griffin Park with a brace in a 5–3 victory over Burton Albion on 18 March. Canós finished the 2016–17 season with four goals from 18 appearances.

==== 2017–18 season ====
An ankle injury, sustained during pre-season, ruled Canós out of the early matches of the 2017–18 season. He made his first appearance of the season with a start versus Aston Villa on 9 September 2017, but lasted just 33 minutes of the 0–0 draw before suffering a recurrence of the same injury. He made his second return of the season as a late substitute in a 3–3 draw with Sunderland on 21 October and scored his first goal of the season on his eighth appearance, in a 3–1 win over West London rivals Fulham on 2 December. Canós was sent off for the first time in his career when he received a straight red card for a tackle on Derby County's Marcus Olsson in a match on 3 February 2018. He finished a "frustrating" 2017–18 season with 31 appearances and three goals.

==== 2018–19 season ====
Canós featured predominantly as a starter through the first half of the 2018–19 season, before dropping to the bench. He regained his starting role late in the month and came into form in late-January and early-February 2019, scoring four goals in as many matches. A dearth of fit full-backs at the club led head coach Thomas Frank to deploy Canós as a right wing back in a number of matches during February 2019 and he finished the 2018–19 season with a career-high 50 appearances and 9 goals.

==== 2019–20 season ====
Canós began the 2019–20 season as an ever-present starter on the wing, before suffering a serious knee injury in late in a match versus Nottingham Forest on 5 October 2019. Shortly afterwards, he signed a new four-year contract, with the option of a further year. Canós returned to outdoor training in February 2020 and due to the COVID-19 pandemic, the three-month suspension imposed on the season allowed him to make substitute appearances after the restart. Canós made 15 appearances during the 2019–20 season, which ended with defeat in the 2020 Championship play-off final. In February 2021, Canós commented that the injury was "the best moment of my career" and made him improve his mentality and "understand why top players are playing in top leagues. I understand how much it takes".

==== 2020–21 season ====
Due to the unavailability and subsequent departure on loan of Saïd Benrahma, Canós began the 2020–21 season primarily in a starting role on the left wing. His performances and four goals in December 2020 (which included the first hat-trick of his career, in 3–2 win over Cardiff City on Boxing Day) won him nominations for the Championship Player of the Month and PFA Fans' Championship Player of the Month awards. Canós finished a "career-defining" 2020–21 season with career highs in appearances (55) and goals (9) and celebrated promotion to the Premier League with victory in the 2021 Championship play-off final.

==== 2021–22 season ====
On the opening night of Brentford's 2021–22 season, Canós scored the club's first Premier League goal in a 2–0 win over Arsenal, with a low driving shot which was later voted the club's Goal of the Season. Aside from his natural wing role, during much the season Canós was often deployed as a right wing back and on occasion, as a forward. Following one month out with a thigh injury, Canós made his 35th appearance of the campaign on the final day of the Premier League season versus Leeds United. He entered the match as a substitute on 63 minutes and 12 minutes later, he levelled the score at 1–1 with his fourth goal of the season, a header. Booked for removing his shirt while celebrating, Canós received a second yellow card two minutes later for a tackle on Raphinha. Following Kristoffer Ajer's departure from the match injured in the 77th minute and with no substitutes remaining, Canós' sending off reduced Brentford to 9 men.

==== 2022–23 season and loan to Olympiacos ====
Following an appearance in Brentford's first match of the 2022–23 pre-season, a hamstring injury saw Canós miss the first month of the regular season. Restricted to sporadic substitute appearances, in competition with five other wide players and unwilling to play wing back, Canós joined Super League Greece club Olympiacos on loan until the end of the 2022–23 season on the final day of the winter transfer window. During a spell affected by a knee injury, he scored four goals in eight appearances. On 1 June 2023, the one-year option on Canós' contract was exercised, but he was not involved in Brentford's 2023–24 pre-season campaign and transferred away from Brentford on 20 August 2023. He ended his career with the club on 246 appearances and 36 goals across his two spells and as its record appearance-maker for a player born outside the British Isles, having overtaken former teammate Toumani Diagouraga.

=== Valencia ===
On 20 August 2023, Canós returned to his native Spain to sign a four-year contract with La Liga club Valencia for an undisclosed fee. He made 31 appearances and scored two goals during a mid-table 2023–24 season. Despite being a regular inclusion in the matchday squad, Canós' appearance count dropped to 22 during a mid-table 2024–25 season. He underwent hernia surgery prior to the final match of the season and was then frozen out of the first team squad late in the 2025–26 pre-season. On 1 September 2025, Canós joined Segunda División club Real Valladolid on loan until the end of the 2025–26 season. He made 21 appearances and scored two goals prior to suffering a season-ending rupture to the anterior cruciate ligament in his right knee during a match versus Cultural Leonesa on 4 April 2026.

== International career ==
Canós made his international debut for Spain at U15 level and was a part of the team which reached the quarter-final of the 2012 Copa de México de Naciones. He progressed to play at U16 and U17 level, making six appearances and scoring two goals during the U17s' unsuccessful qualification campaign for the 2014 European U17 Championship.

Canós made his U19 debut in a friendly against Italy on 20 January 2016 and appeared in two of Spain's three 2016 European U19 Championship unsuccessful elite round qualifiers three months later.

== Style of play ==
Canós has been described as "very good technically", "a quick attacking player", "someone who can dribble, can score goals and can provide assists" and who "unashamedly, wears his heart on his sleeve and thrives off the energy and passion of a paying crowd". He describes himself as "a player whose confidence is based on goals, assists, creating chances, crosses".

== Personal life ==
Canós is a Valencia supporter. His family ran a Spanish restaurant, Gracias, on Penny Lane in Liverpool. His mother died in February 2023.

== Career statistics ==
As of match played 4 March 2026

Appearances and goals by club, season and competition
Club	Season	League			National cup (Note: Includes FA Cup, Greek Cup, Copa del Rey)		League cup (Note: Includes EFL Cup)		Other		Total	
Club	Season	Division	Apps	Goals	Apps	Goals	Apps	Goals	Apps	Goals	Apps	Goals
Liverpool	2015–16	Premier League	1	0	—		—		—		1	0
Brentford (loan)	2015–16	Championship	38	7	1	0	—		—		39	7
Norwich City	2016–17	Championship	3	0	1	0	2	2	—		6	2
Norwich City U21	2016–17	—							3 (Note: Appearances in EFL Trophy)	1	3	1
Brentford	2016–17	Championship	18	4	—		—		—		18	4
Brentford	2017–18	Championship	30	3	1	0	0	0	—		31	3
Brentford	2018–19	Championship	44	7	4	2	2	0	—		50	9
Brentford	2019–20	Championship	13	0	0	0	0	0	2 (Note: Appearances in Championship play-offs)	0	15	0
Brentford	2020–21	Championship	46	9	1	0	5	0	3	0	55	9
Brentford	2021–22	Premier League	31	3	1	0	3	1	—		35	4
Brentford	2022–23	Premier League	5	0	1	0	0	0	—		6	0
Brentford	Total		225	33	9	2	10	1	5	0	249	36
Olympiacos (loan)	2022–23	Super League Greece	8	4	0	0	—		—		8	4
Valencia	2023–24	La Liga	27	1	4	1	—		—		31	2
Valencia	2024–25	La Liga	17	0	5	1	—		—		22	1
Valencia	Total		44	1	9	2	—		—		53	3
Real Valladolid (loan)	2025–26	Segunda División	21	2	0	0	—		—		21	2
Career total			302	40	19	4	12	3	8	1	341	47

== Honours ==
Brentford

- EFL Championship play-offs: 2021

Individual

- Mediterranean International Cup Player of the Tournament: 2013
