= Cenk Özkacar =

Turkish footballer (born 2000)

Personal information
- Date of birth: 6 October 2000 (age 26)
- Place of birth: İzmir, Turkey
- Height: 1.87 m (6 ft 2 in)
- Position: Defender

Team information
- Current team: Trabzonspor
- Number: 39

Youth career
- 2011–2013: Bucaspor
- 2013–2014: Altinordu
- 2014–2018: Altay

Senior career*
Years	Team	Apps	(Gls)
2018–2020	Altay	12	(0)
2018–2019	→ Karacabey Belediyespor (loan)	23	(1)
2020–2021	Lyon B	2	(0)
2020–2023	Lyon	0	(0)
2021–2022	→ OH Leuven (loan)	32	(2)
2022–2023	→ Valencia (loan)	17	(0)
2023–2026	Valencia	23	(0)
2024–2025	→ Valladolid (loan)	11	(0)
2025–2026	→ 1. FC Köln (loan)	25	(0)
2026–	Trabzonspor	4	(0)

International career^{‡}
2019–2022	Turkey U21	6	(0)
2022–	Turkey	9	(0)
- * Club domestic league appearances and goals as of 19 October 2026 ‡ National team caps and goals as of 4 June 2024

Cenk Özkacar (born 6 October 2000) is a Turkish professional footballer who plays as a defender for Turkish club Trabzonspor and the Turkey national team. Mainly a centre-back, he can also play as a left-back.

== Club career ==
=== Early years in Turkey ===
Born in İzmir, Özkacar spent his youth career at local teams Bucaspor, Altinordu and Altay. He made his professional debut in 2018, while on loan at Karacabey Belediyespor, before returning to Altay the following year.

=== Lyon ===
On 18 August 2020, Özkacar joined Ligue 1 club Lyon on a five-year deal. On 21 April 2021, he made his debut for Lyon as a late substitute for Léo Dubois during a 2–0 loss to Monaco in the Coupe de France.

==== Loan to Leuven ====
On 6 July 2021, Belgian First Division A team OH Leuven added Özkacar on loan from Lyon for one season.

=== Valencia ===
In August 2022, Özkacar signed on loan for La Liga side Valencia. On 1 July 2023, the club exercised their buy-option in the loan contract, signing him permanently on a five-year contract.

However, Özkacar scored an own-goal in a 1–0 loss against Deportivo Alavés, and only started 35% of matches in La Liga by January 2024, leading some media outlets to report he was seeking a move away in order to make it in Turkey's UEFA Euro 2024 squad.

==== Loan to Valladolid ====
On 29 August 2024, Özkacar was loaned to fellow Spanish top-tier side Real Valladolid on a one-year deal.

==== Loan to Köln ====
On 9 August 2025, Özkacar moved on loan to 1. FC Köln in Germany.

=== Trabzonspor ===
On 18 July 2026, Özkacar returned to Turkey, signing for Trabzonspor.

== International career ==
Özkacar was capped six times by the Turkey U21s.

He had his first cap with the Turkey senior national team on 8 June 2022, getting subbed on in the UEFA Nations League match against Lithuania, replacing Ozan Kabak in the 76th minute. He managed to help his team keeping the clean sheet and ended up winning 6–0.

== Career statistics ==
=== Club ===
As of match played 16 May 2026

Appearances and goals by club, season and competition
Club	Season	League			National cup (Note: Includes Turkish Cup, Coupe de France, Belgian Cup, Copa del Rey, DFB-Pokal)		Other		Total	
Club	Season	Division	Apps	Goals	Apps	Goals	Apps	Goals	Apps	Goals
Karacabey Belediyespor (loan)	2018–19	TFF Third League	21	1	1	0	2 (Note: Appearances in TFF Third League play-offs)	0	24	1
Altay	2019–20	TFF First League	12	0	4	0	—		16	0
Lyon	2020–21	Ligue 1	0	0	1	0	—		1	0
Lyon B	2020–21	Championnat National 2	2	0	—		—		2	0
OH Leuven (loan)	2021–22	Belgian Pro League	32	2	2	0	—		34	2
Valencia (loan)	2022–23	La Liga	17	0	3	0	1 (Note: Appearance in Supercopa de España)	0	21	0
Valencia	2023–24	La Liga	23	0	2	0	—		25	0
Real Valladolid (loan)	2024–25	La Liga	11	0	1	0	—		12	0
1. FC Köln (loan)	2025–26	Bundesliga	25	0	2	0	—		27	0
Career total			143	3	16	0	3	0	162	3

=== International ===
As of match played 4 June 2024

Appearances and goals by national team and year
National team	Year	Apps	Goals
Turkey	2022	3	0
Turkey	2023	4	0
Turkey	2024	2	0
Total		9	0
