= Alexander Gurendal =

Norwegian footballer (born 2005)

Personal information
- Full name: Alexander Figueiredo Gurendal
- Date of birth: 2 March 2005 (age 21)
- Place of birth: Tromsø, Norway
- Height: 1.84 m (6 ft 0 in)
- Position: Striker

Team information
- Current team: Start
- Number: 7

Youth career
- 2011–: Trønder-Lyn
- –2018: Melhus
- 2018–2020: Freidig
- 2020–2021: Torrevieja
- 2021–2024: Valencia

Senior career*
Years	Team	Apps	(Gls)
2023–2026	Valencia Mestalla	22	(0)
2026–	Start	1	(0)

International career^{‡}
2021	Norway U16	2	(0)
2022	Norway U17	6	(0)
2023	Norway U18	4	(1)
2024	Norway U19	2	(0)
- * Club domestic league appearances and goals as of 13 April 2026 ‡ National team caps and goals as of 13 April 2026

Alexander Figueiredo Gurendal (born 2 March 2005) is a Norwegian footballer who plays as a winger for IK Start in the Eliteserien.

== Early life ==
Gurendal was born to a Portuguese mother of Angolan descent and Norwegian father. He moved with his father to Spain when he joined the youth academy of Spanish La Liga side Valencia.

== Career ==
Gurendal started his career with Spanish side Valencia Mestalla.

Ahead of the 2026 season, Gurendal signed for newly promoted Eliteserien side Start on a three-year contract.

== Style of play ==
Gurendal mainly operates as a winger and is known for his speed.

== Career statistics ==
=== Club ===
As of match played 22 October 2023

Appearances and goals by club, season and competition
Club	Season	League			Copa del Rey		Other		Total	
Club	Season	Division	Apps	Goals	Apps	Goals	Apps	Goals	Apps	Goals
Valencia B	2022–23	Segunda Federación	1	0	—		0	0	1	0
Valencia B	2023–24	Segunda Federación	2	0	—		—		2	0
Career total			3	0	0	0	0	0	3	0
