= Nil Ruiz =

Spanish footballer

Personal information
- Full name: Nil Ruiz Pascual
- Date of birth: 21 February 2003 (age 23)
- Place of birth: Barcelona, Spain
- Height: 1.90 m (6 ft 3 in)
- Position: Goalkeeper

Team information
- Current team: Europa

Youth career
- 2016–2018: Sant Ildefons
- 2018–2022: Damm

Senior career*
| Years | Team | Apps | (Gls) |
| 2022–2023 | Barcelona B | 4 | (0) |
| 2023–2026 | Valencia B | 46 | (0) |
| 2026 | Sabadell | 0 | (0) |
| 2026– | Europa | 0 | (0) |
- * Club domestic league appearances and goals as of 25 May 2026

Nil Ruiz Pascual (born 21 February 2003) is a Spanish footballer who plays as a goalkeeper for CE Europa.

== Career ==
Born in Barcelona, Catalonia, Ruiz represented UE San Ildefons and CF Damm as a youth. After impressing with the latter's Juvenil squad, he agreed to a two-year contract with FC Barcelona on 30 May 2022, being initially assigned to the reserves in Primera Federación.

On 14 July 2023, after being a backup to Arnau Tenas, Ruiz moved to another reserve team, Valencia CF Mestalla in Segunda Federación. Initially a starter, he lost his first-choice status to Vicent Abril, and later moved to third division side CE Sabadell FC on 29 January 2026, as a backup to Diego Fuoli as José Ortega was unavailable.

Back to a third-choice status after Ortega returned, Ruiz left the Arquelinats after their promotion, and was announced at fellow division three side CE Europa on 12 July 2026.

== Career statistics ==
=== Club ===
As of match played 20 April 2024

Appearances and goals by club, season and competition
| Club | Season | League | | | Cup | | Europe | | Other | | Total | |
| Club | Season | Division | Apps | Goals | Apps | Goals | Apps | Goals | Apps | Goals | Apps | Goals |
|---|---|---|---|---|---|---|---|---|---|---|---|---|
| Barcelona Atlètic | 2022–23 | Primera Federación | 4 | 0 | — | | — | | — | | 4 | 0 |
| Valencia B | 2023–24 | Segunda Federación | 30 | 0 | — | | — | | — | | 30 | 0 |
| Career total | | | 34 | 0 | — | | — | | — | | 34 | 0 |
