= Hugo Guillamón =

Spanish footballer (born 2000)

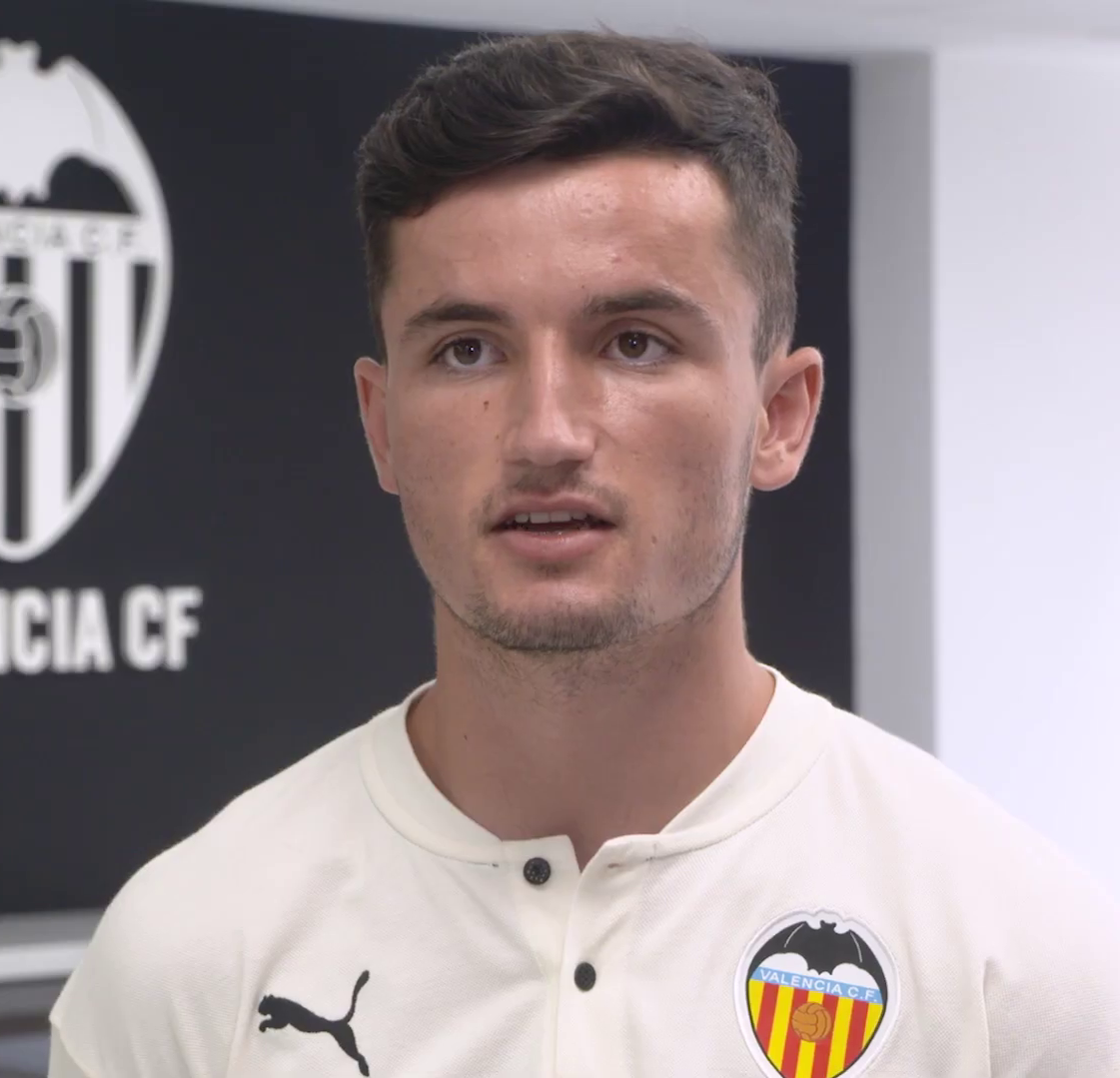
- Guillamón with Valencia in 2020

Personal information
- Full name: Hugo Guillamón Sanmartín
- Date of birth: 31 January 2000 (age 26)
- Place of birth: San Sebastián, Spain
- Height: 1.78 m (5 ft 10 in)
- Positions: Defensive midfielder; centre-back

Team information
- Current team: Sporting Gijón

Youth career
- 2009–2017: Valencia

Senior career*
Years	Team	Apps	(Gls)
2017–2020	Valencia B	57	(2)
2020–2025	Valencia	125	(4)
2025–2026	Hajduk Split	23	(0)
2026–	Sporting Gijón	0	(0)

International career^{‡}
2016	Spain U16	3	(0)
2016–2017	Spain U17	23	(0)
2018	Spain U18	3	(0)
2018–2019	Spain U19	14	(1)
2020–2023	Spain U21	17	(3)
2021–2022	Spain	3	(1)
Medal record
Representing Spain
UEFA European Under-21 Championship
Runner-up	2023 Georgia–Romania	Team
UEFA European Under-19 Championship
Winner	2019 Armenia	Team
FIFA U-17 World Cup
Runner-up	2017 India	Team
UEFA European Under-17 Championship
Winner	2017 Croatia	Team
- * Club domestic league appearances and goals as of 15 June 2026 ‡ National team caps and goals as of 23:33, 27 June 2023 (UTC)

Hugo Guillamón Sanmartín (born 31 January 2000) is a Spanish professional footballer who plays as a defensive midfielder or centre-back for Sporting de Gijón.

Guillamón came through the youth ranks at Valencia, where he made his first-team debut in 2020. He made his senior international debut for Spain in 2021, and was chosen for the 2022 FIFA World Cup.

== Club career ==
Born in San Sebastián, Gipuzkoa, Basque Country, Guillamón moved to L'Eliana, Valencian Community at the age of two. He made his senior debut with the reserves on 16 December 2017, coming on as a first-half substitute for Ivan Zotko in a 0–0 Segunda División B home draw against Badalona.

On 23 December 2017, Guillamón renewed his contract with the Che until 2020. The following 27 October, he scored his first senior goal, netting the opener in a 3–2 home loss against Alcoyano.

Guillamón made his first team – and La Liga – debut on 22 February 2020, replacing injured Eliaquim Mangala at half-time in a 3–0 defeat away to Real Sociedad. On 22 July, he renewed his contract until 2023, being definitely promoted to the main squad. He scored his first goal for the team on 22 November in a 2–2 draw at Alavés.

On 13 August 2021, in the first game of the season at home to Getafe, Guillamón fouled Nemanja Maksimović after 39 seconds. After consulting the video assistant referee, his third-minute dismissal was the earliest on a La Liga opening weekend; his team nonetheless won 1–0.

Guillamón started in the 2022 Copa del Rey Final, being substituted in the 85th minute as Valencia lost on penalties to Real Betis. On 3 October that year, he extended his contract to last until June 2026.

On 26 August 2025, after five seasons with Valencia's first team, Guillamón joined Croatian side HNK Hajduk Split on a free transfer, signing a two-year contract with the club. On 28 July of the following year, he returned to Spain after agreeing to a two-year deal with Segunda División side Sporting de Gijón.

== International career ==
Guillamón represented Spain at under-17 and under-19 levels, having won the 2017 UEFA European Under-17 Championship for the former and 2019 UEFA European Under-19 Championship for the latter.

Due to the isolation of some national team players following the positive COVID-19 test of Sergio Busquets, Spain's under-21 squad were called up for the international friendly against Lithuania on 8 June 2021. Guillamón made his senior debut in the match and scored in the 3rd minute of their 4–0 win.

Guillamón was chosen for the 2022 FIFA World Cup in Qatar. He took no part in Spain's four matches, and the side were eliminated in the last 16 by Morocco.

== Personal life ==
As of November 2022, Guillamón was combining his professional football career with a degree in biomedical engineering from the Technical University of Valencia.

== Career statistics ==
=== Club ===
As of match played 5 April 2025

Appearances and goals by club, season and competition
Club	Season	League			Copa del Rey		Europe		Other		Total	
Club	Season	Division	Apps	Goals	Apps	Goals	Apps	Goals	Apps	Goals	Apps	Goals
Valencia B	2017–18	Segunda División B	11	0	—		—		—		11	0
Valencia B	2018–19	Segunda División B	29	1	—		—		—		29	1
Valencia B	2019–20	Segunda División B	17	1	—		—		—		17	1
Valencia B	Total		57	2	0	0	0	0	0	0	57	2
Valencia	2019–20	La Liga	6	0	0	0	—		—		6	0
Valencia	2020–21	La Liga	25	1	2	0	—		—		27	1
Valencia	2021–22	La Liga	31	1	6	1	—		—		37	2
Valencia	2022–23	La Liga	25	1	3	0	—		1 (Note: Appearance in Supercopa de España)	0	29	1
Valencia	2023–24	La Liga	26	1	4	0	—		—		30	1
Valencia	2024–25	La Liga	12	0	5	0	—		—		17	0
Valencia	Total		125	4	20	1	0	0	1	0	146	5
Career total			182	6	20	1	0	0	1	0	203	7

=== International ===
As of match played 27 September 2022

Appearances and goals by national team and year
National team	Year	Apps	Goals
Spain	2021	1	1
Spain	2022	2	0
Total		3	1

As of match played 27 September 2022
Scores and results list Spain's goal tally first, score column indicates score after each Guillamón goal.

List of international goals scored by Hugo Guillamón
No.	Date	Venue	Opponent	Score	Result	Competition
1	8 June 2021	Butarque, Leganés, Spain	Lithuania	1–0	4–0	Friendly

== Honours ==
Spain U17

- UEFA European Under-17 Championship: 2017

Spain U19

- UEFA European Under-19 Championship: 2019

Spain U21

- UEFA European Under-21 Championship: Runner-up 2023
