= Hugo Duro =

Spanish footballer (born 1999)

Personal information
- Full name: Hugo Duro Perales
- Date of birth: 10 November 1999 (age 27)
- Place of birth: Getafe, Spain
- Height: 1.77 m (5 ft 10 in)
- Position: Striker

Team information
- Current team: Valencia
- Number: 9

Youth career
- 2004–2017: Getafe

Senior career*
Years	Team	Apps	(Gls)
2017–2019	Getafe B	69	(32)
2017–2022	Getafe	26	(1)
2020–2021	→ Real Madrid B (loan)	19	(12)
2021	→ Real Madrid (loan)	2	(0)
2021–2022	→ Valencia (loan)	30	(7)
2022–	Valencia	134	(35)

International career
2020	Spain U21	1	(1)
- * Club domestic league appearances and goals as of 27 May 2026

Hugo Duro Perales (born 10 November 1999) is a Spanish professional footballer who plays as a striker for La Liga club Valencia.

== Club career ==
=== Getafe ===
Born in Getafe, Madrid, Duro joined Getafe CF's youth setup in 2004, aged five. On 24 October 2017, before even appearing with the reserves, he made his professional debut by coming on as a second-half substitute for Chuli in a 1–0 home loss against Deportivo Alavés, for the season's Copa del Rey.

Duro first appeared with the B-side on 29 October 2017, replacing Carlos Calderón in a 2–1 Tercera División away win against CD El Álamo. He scored his first senior goals on 19 November, netting a brace in a 3–0 home win against DAV Santa Ana.

On 17 March 2018, Duro made his La Liga debut in a 2–1 win at Real Sociedad, as a last-minute replacement for Jorge Molina. The following 29 January, in the cup quarter-finals against Valencia CF, he accidentally blocked a goal-bound shot by Molina as Getafe led on away goals in added time; twelve seconds after the ball ricocheted off his back, opponent Rodrigo scored the winning goal. Valencia's fans and players then turned the television commentary "Tocó en Hugo Duro" (It hit Hugo Duro) into a motto as they went on to win the cup, receiving a complaint from the player's agent.

Duro scored his first goal in the division on 8 July 2020, coming off the bench to equalise in a 3–1 home loss to Villarreal CF. The following month, he signed for Real Madrid on a season-long loan deal with option to buy, being initially assigned to the reserves in Segunda División B. He made his first-team debut for Los Blancos on 20 February, in a 1–0 away win over Real Valladolid, and he first appeared in the UEFA Champions League four days later, as he replaced Marco Asensio in a 1–0 victory over Atalanta B.C. at the Stadio Atleti Azzurri d'Italia. Real were refused permission to loan him for a second season and did not make the €4 million payment to make the deal permanent.

=== Valencia ===
On 31 August 2021, Duro moved to fellow first division side Valencia CF on a one-year loan deal, reuniting with former Getafe manager José Bordalás. He made his debut on 12 September in a 4–1 win at CA Osasuna, as a half-time replacement for defender José Gayà. A week later, he scored his first goal to open a 2–1 loss to Real Madrid at the Mestalla Stadium; he totalled seven in his first league campaign, including two added-time goals to gain a 3–3 draw at home to Atlético Madrid on 7 November. On 31 December, he was sent off in a 2–1 loss to visitors RCD Espanyol.

In the 2021–22 Copa del Rey, Duro scored the winner in a 2–1 quarter-final win against Cádiz CF on 2 February 2022, and the equaliser in the first leg of the semi-final against Athletic Bilbao eight days later. In the final on 23 April, he netted Valencia's goal in the 1–1 draw, being replaced by Bryan Gil with five minutes of regulation time remaining in an eventual penalty shootout defeat to Real Betis.

In May 2022, Duro's loan was made permanent on a four-year deal for a fee of €4 million. In the 2023–24 season, he became the top scorer for his club, as he also set a new personal best in La Liga by scoring 13 goals.

== Personal life ==
Duro is married to racing driver Nerea Martí.

== Career statistics ==
=== Club ===
As of match played 23 May 2026

Appearances and goals by club, season and competition
Club	Season	League			Copa del Rey		Europe		Other		Total	
Club	Season	Division	Apps	Goals	Apps	Goals	Apps	Goals	Apps	Goals	Apps	Goals
Getafe B	2017–18	Tercera División	24	9	—		—		—		24	9
Getafe B	2018–19	Tercera División	22	12	—		—		2 (Note: Appearances in Tercera División promotion play-offs)	2	24	14
Getafe B	2019–20	Segunda División B	23	11	—		—		—		23	11
Getafe B	Total		69	32	0	0	0	0	2	2	71	34
Getafe	2017–18	La Liga	2	0	1	0	—		—		3	0
Getafe	2018–19	La Liga	11	0	3	0	—		—		14	0
Getafe	2019–20	La Liga	12	1	1	0	2 (Note: Appearances in UEFA Europa League)	0	—		15	1
Getafe	2021–22	La Liga	1	0	0	0	—		—		1	0
Getafe	Total		26	1	5	0	2	0	0	0	33	1
Real Madrid B (loan)	2020–21	Segunda División B	19	12	—		—		1 (Note: Appearance in Segunda División B play-offs)	0	20	12
Real Madrid (loan)	2020–21	La Liga	2	0	0	0	1 (Note: Appearance in UEFA Champions League)	0	0	0	3	0
Valencia (loan)	2021–22	La Liga	30	7	6	3	—		—		36	10
Valencia	2022–23	La Liga	30	1	3	1	—		1 (Note: Appearance in Supercopa de España)	0	34	2
Valencia	2023–24	La Liga	37	13	2	0	—		—		39	13
Valencia	2024–25	La Liga	31	11	1	0	—		—		32	11
Valencia	2025–26	La Liga	36	10	5	1	—		—		41	11
Valencia	Valencia total		164	42	17	5	—		1	0	182	47
Career total			280	87	22	5	3	0	4	2	309	94

== Honours ==
Getafe B

- Tercera División: 2018–19

Valencia

- Copa del Rey runner-up: 2021–22
