= 2021–22 Valencia CF season =

101st season in existence of Valencia CF

Valencia CF
2021–22 season
- Owner: Peter Lim
- President: Anil Murthy
- Head coach: José Bordalás
- Stadium: Mestalla
- La Liga: 9th
- Copa del Rey: Runners-up
- Top goalscorer: League: Gonçalo Guedes; Carlos Soler (11 each); All: Gonçalo Guedes (13)
- Highest home attendance: 37,472 vs Atlético Madrid (7 November 2021)
- Lowest home attendance: 9,868 vs Getafe (13 August 2021)
- Biggest win: Valencia 3–0 Alavés; Utrillas 0–3 Valencia; Osasuna 1–4 Valencia
- Biggest defeat: Real Betis 4–1 Valencia
Home colours	Away colours	Third colours

The 2021–22 season was the 102nd season in the existence of Valencia CF and its 87th consecutive season in La Liga, the top flight of Spanish football. In addition to the domestic league, Valencia participated in this season's edition of the Copa del Rey, finishing as runners-up.

== Players ==
=== La Liga squad information ===
No.	Pos.	Nat.	Player	Date of birth (age)	Signed in	Contract ends	Signed from / Last club
Goalkeepers
1	GK	(Spain)	Jaume Doménech	5 November 1990 (age 36)	2015	2022	(Spain) Valencia Mestalla
13	GK	(Netherlands)	Jasper Cillessen	22 April 1989 (age 37)	2019	2023	(Spain) Barcelona
Defenders
2	DF	(Portugal)	Thierry Correia	9 March 1999 (age 27)	2019	2024	(Portugal) Sporting CP
3	DF	(Spain)	Toni Lato	21 October 1997 (age 29)	2017	2023	(Spain) Valencia Mestalla
5	DF	(Brazil)	Gabriel Paulista	26 December 1990 (age 35)	2017	2024	(England) Arsenal
6	DF	(Spain)	Hugo Guillamón	31 January 2000 (age 26)	2018	2023	(Spain) Valencia Mestalla
12	DF	(France)	Mouctar Diakhaby	19 December 1996 (age 29)	2018	2023	(France) Lyon
14	DF	(Spain)	José Gayà (Captain)	25 May 1995 (age 31)	2012	2023	(Spain) Valencia Mestalla
15	DF	(Paraguay)	Omar Alderete	26 December 1996 (age 29)	2021	2024	(Germany) Hertha BSC
20	DF	(Guadeloupe)	Dimitri Foulquier	23 March 1993 (age 33)	2021	2025	(Spain) Granada
24	DF	(Switzerland)	Eray Cömert	4 February 1998 (age 28)	2022	2025	(Switzerland) Basel
Midfielders
4	MF	(United States)	Yunus Musah	29 November 2002 (age 23)	2019	2026	(Spain) Valencia Mestalla
8	MF	(Serbia)	Uroš Račić	17 March 1998 (age 28)	2018	2024	(Serbia) Red Star Belgrade
10	MF	(Spain)	Carlos Soler	2 January 1997 (age 29)	2016	2023	(Spain) Valencia Mestalla
17	MF	(Russia)	Denis Cheryshev	26 November 1990 (age 35)	2018	2023	(Spain) Villarreal
21	MF	(Spain)	Bryan Gil	11 February 2001 (age 25)	2022	2022	(England) Tottenham Hotspur
23	MF	(Mali)	Ilaix Moriba	19 January 2003 (age 23)	2022	2022	(Germany) RB Leipzig
Forwards
7	FW	(Portugal)	Gonçalo Guedes	29 November 1996 (age 29)	2017	2023	(France) Paris Saint-Germain
9	FW	(Uruguay)	Maxi Gómez	14 August 1996 (age 30)	2019	2024	(Spain) Celta Vigo
11	FW	(Angola) (Portugal)	Hélder Costa	12 January 1994 (age 32)	2021	2022	(England) Leeds United
19	FW	(Spain)	Hugo Duro	10 November 1999 (age 26)	2021	2022	(Spain) Getafe
22	FW	(Brazil)	Marcos André	20 October 1996 (age 30)	2021	2026	(Spain) Valladolid
Players who left the club during season
11	FW	(Spain)	Rubén Sobrino	1 June 1992 (age 34)	2017	2022	(Spain) Cádiz
16	MF	(Spain)	Álex Blanco	16 December 1998 (age 27)	2018	2022	(Spain) Valencia Mestalla
18	MF	(Denmark)	Daniel Wass	31 May 1989 (age 37)	2018	2022	(Spain) Celta Vigo
20	MF	(South Korea)	Lee Kang-in	19 February 2001 (age 25)	2018	2022	(Spain) Valencia Mestalla
23	MF	(Spain)	Jason	7 June 1994 (age 32)	2019	2022	(Spain) Levante
24	DF	(Italy)	Cristiano Piccini	29 June 1992 (age 34)	2018	2022	(Italy) Atalanta
Players who were loaned out during season
21	FW	(Spain)	Manu Vallejo	14 February 1997 (age 29)	2019	2024	(Spain) Cádiz
25	GK	(Spain)	Cristian Rivero	21 March 1998 (age 28)	2019	2024	(Spain) Valencia Mestalla
	DF	(Spain)	Jorge Sáenz	7 November 1996 (age 30)		2024	(Spain) Celta de Vigo

=== Reserve squad information ===
No.	Pos.	Nat.	Player	Date of birth (age)	Signed in	Contract ends	Signed from / Last club
Goalkeepers
28	GK	(Georgia (country))	Giorgi Mamardashvili	29 September 2000 (age 26)	2021	2024	(Georgia (country)) Dinamo Tbilisi
	GK	(Spain)	Juanjo Garrancho	22 June 1997 (age 29)	2021	2022	(Spain) Cádiz
	GK	(Spain)	Charlie Pérez	7 June 2002 (age 24)	2021	2023	(Spain) Valencia Mestalla
Defenders
32	DF	(Spain)	Jesús Vázquez Alcalde	2 January 2003 (age 23)	2021	2025	(Spain) Valencia Mestalla
34	DF	(Spain)	Joseda Menargues	1 May 2002 (age 24)	2020	2023	(Spain) Valencia Mestalla
37	DF	(Spain)	Cristhian Mosquera	27 June 2004 (age 22)	2021	2025	(Spain) Valencia Mestalla
39	DF	(Spain)	Rubén Iranzo	14 March 2003 (age 23)	2021	2023	(Spain) Valencia Mestalla
	DF	(Spain)	David Ruiz Montero	17 April 2003 (age 23)	2021	2023	(Spain) Valencia Mestalla
	DF	(Spain)	Iván Muñoz	27 February 2002 (age 24)	2021	2023	(Spain) Valencia Mestalla
	DF	(Spain)	Rubén Iranzo	14 March 2003 (age 23)	2021	2023	(Spain) Valencia Mestalla
	DF	(Spain)	Miquel Bosch	9 June 2001 (age 25)	2021	2022	(Spain) Alzira
	DF	(Spain)	Marc Ferris	24 January 1997 (age 29)	2016	2022	(Spain) Huracán U19
	DF	(Spain)	César Tárrega	26 February 2002 (age 24)	2021	2023	(Spain) Atlético Levante
	DF	(Uruguay)	Facundo González	6 July 2003 (age 23)	2020	2023	(Spain) Espanyol Cantera
Midfielders
27	MF	(France)	Koba Koindredi	27 October 2001 (age 25)	2021	2025	(France) Lens Reserve
30	MF	(Spain)	Javi Guerra	13 May 2003 (age 23)	2021	2022	(Spain) Valencia Mestalla
31	MF	(Spain)	Hugo González	7 February 2003 (age 23)	2021	2024	(Spain) Valencia Mestalla
36	MF	(Peru)	Alessandro Burlamaqui	18 February 2002 (age 24)	2021	2024	(Spain) Espanyol Cantera
40	MF	(Ivory Coast)	Lassina Sangaré	20 November 2001 (age 24)	2021	2023	(Ivory Coast) Williamsville Athletic Club
	MF	(Spain)	Adrián Gómez	27 October 2001 (age 25)	2019	2022	(Poland) Podbeskidzie Bielsko-Biała
	MF	(Spain)	Fran Pérez Martínez	9 September 2003 (age 23)	2020	2023	(Spain) Valencia Mestalla
	MF	(Spain)	Hugo González Sotos	27 February 2003 (age 23)	2020	2022	(Spain) Valencia Mestalla
	MF	(Spain)	Pedro Alemañ	21 March 2002 (age 24)	2020	2022	(Spain) Valencia Mestalla
Forwards
33	FW	(Spain)	Diego López	13 May 2002 (age 24)	2021	2024	(Spain) Barcelona U19
35	FW	(Spain)	Alberto Marí	11 July 2001 (age 25)	2021	2024	(Spain) Vitoria
38	FW	(Spain)	Pablo Gozálbez	30 April 2001 (age 25)	2019	2023	(Spain) Valencia Mestalla
	FW	(France)	Noha Ndombasi	28 April 2001 (age 25)	2020	2022	(France) Bordeaux U19
	FW	(Ghana)	Bashiru Mohammed	1 January 2002 (age 24)	2021	2023	(Spain) Talavera U19
Players who left the club during season
Players who were loaned out during season
26	MF	(Spain)	Vicente Esquerdo	2 January 1999 (age 27)	2018	2024	(Spain) Ciudad de Benidorm Youth
29	DF	(Argentina)	Kevin Sibille	15 September 1998 (age 28)	2021	2022	(Argentina) River Plate Reserve

== Transfers ==
=== In ===
No.	Pos.	Player	Transferred from	Fee	Date	Source
	DF	(Spain) Jorge Sáenz	(Spain) Celta Vigo	Loan return	1 July 2021	
32	DF	(Spain) Javier Jiménez	(Spain) Albacete	Loan return	1 July 2021	
	DF	(Spain) Adrià Guerrero	(Switzerland) Lugano	Loan return	1 July 2021	
21	DF	(Italy) Cristiano Piccini	(Italy) Atalanta	Loan return	1 July 2021	
11	FW	(Spain) Rubén Sobrino	(Spain) Cádiz	Loan return	1 July 2021	
28	GK	(Georgia (country)) Giorgi Mamardashvili	(Georgia (country)) Dinamo Tbilisi	Loan with €1m buy option	1 July 2021	
	FW	(Spain) Diego López	(Spain) Barcelona U19	Free	1 July 2021	
	FW	(Spain) Alberto Marí	(Spain) Vitoria	Free	2 July 2021	
15	DF	(Paraguay) Omar Alderete	(Germany) Hertha BSC	Loan with €7.5m buy option	13 July 2021	
22	FW	(Brazil) Marcos André	(Spain) Valladolid	€8m	25 August 2021	
11	FW	(Angola) (Portugal) Hélder Costa	(England) Leeds United	Loan	31 August 2021	
19	FW	(Spain) Hugo Duro	(Spain) Getafe	Loan with €4m buy option	31 August 2021	
20	DF	(Guadeloupe) Dimitri Foulquier	(Spain) Granada	€2.8m	31 August 2021	
	FW	(Japan) Wadi Ibrahim Suzuki	(Japan) Tokushima Vortis	2 years loan	31 August 2021	
	GK	(Spain) Juanjo Garrancho	(Spain) Cádiz B	Free	31 August 2021	
28	GK	(Georgia (country)) Giorgi Mamardashvili	(Georgia (country)) Dinamo Tbilisi	€1m	1 January 2022	
24	DF	(Switzerland) Eray Cömert	(Switzerland) Basel	€0.8m	25 January 2022	
23	MF	(Guinea) Ilaix Moriba	(Germany) RB Leipzig	Season loan	28 January 2022	
21	MF	(Spain) Bryan Gil	(England) Tottenham Hotspur	Season loan	31 January 2022	
Total				€16,600,000		

Note 1: Javier Jiménez moved back to Albacete after his loan ended on a permanent deal.

Note 2: Adrià Guerrero joined Zürich after returning to the club on a permanent deal.

=== Out ===
No.	Pos.	Player	Transferred to	Fee	Date	Source
	FW	(Spain) Fran Navarro	(Portugal) Gil Vicente	Free	26 June 2021	
6	DF	(Portugal) Ferro	(Portugal) Benfica	Loan return	1 July 2021	
10	MF	(Uruguay) Christian Oliva	(Italy) Cagliari	Loan return	1 July 2021	
11	FW	(Italy) Patrick Cutrone	(England) Wolverhampton Wanderers	Loan return	1 July 2021	
4	DF	(France) Eliaquim Mangala	(France) Saint-Étienne	Free	1 July 2021	
9	FW	(France) Kevin Gameiro	(France) Strasbourg	Free	1 July 2021	
32	DF	(Spain) Javier Jiménez	(Spain) Albacete	Undisclosed	1 July 2021	
	GK	(Spain) Emilio Bernard	(Spain) Sabadell	Free	1 July 2021	
	DF	(Spain) Adrià Guerrero	(Switzerland) Zürich	Undisclosed	1 July 2021	
	MF	(Spain) Carlos Pérez	(Spain) Villarreal CF B	Free	1 July 2021	
29	DF	(Argentina) Kevin Sibille	(Spain) Castellón	Season loan	24 July 2021	
	DF	(Spain) Jorge Sáenz	(Portugal) Marítimo	Season loan	28 July 2021	
31	DF	(Spain) Guillem Molina	(Spain) Sabadell	Free	11 August 2021	
20	MF	(South Korea) Lee Kang-in	(Spain) Mallorca	Free	29 August 2021	
11	FW	(Spain) Rubén Sobrino	(Spain) Cádiz	Undisclosed	30 August 2021	
26	MF	(Spain) Vicente Esquerdo	(Spain) Castellón	Season loan	30 August 2021	
23	MF	(Spain) Jason	(Spain) Alavés	Undisclosed	3 January 2022	
24	DF	(Italy) Cristiano Piccini	(Serbia) Red Star Belgrade	Undisclosed	15 January 2022	
16	MF	(Spain) Álex Blanco	(Italy) Como	Undisclosed	18 January 2022	
18	MF	(Denmark) Daniel Wass	(Spain) Atlético Madrid	€2.8m	27 January 2022	
25	GK	(Spain) Cristian Rivero	(Spain) Alcorcón	Season loan	30 January 2022	
	DF	(Spain) Jorge Sáenz	(Spain) Mirandés	Season loan	30 January 2022	
21	MF	(Spain) Manu Vallejo	(Spain) Alavés	Season loan	31 January 2022	
Total				€2,800,000		

Note 1: Jorge Saenz's loan at Portuguese club Marítimo was cancelled mid-season before he moved to Mirandés.

=== Extension ===
Position	Player	Source
GK	(Spain) Cristian Rivero	3-year contract signed in 2021
DF	(Spain) Jesús Vázquez Alcalde	4-year contract signed in 2021
MF	(France) (New Caledonia) Koba Koindredi	4-year contract signed in 2021

== Pre-season and friendlies ==
Win Draw Loss Fixtures

16 July 2021 Friendly	Valencia	3–2	Villarreal	Paterna, Valencia
18:30 CEST (UTC+2)	Guillamón (yellow card) 24'; Alderete (yellow card) 44'; Vallejo 68', 86' (pen.); Cheryshev 90+4'	Report	Moreno 45'; Cuenca (yellow card) 63', (goal) 67'	Stadium: Oliva Nova Beach & Golf Resort; Attendance: 0 Referee: Juan Manuel Gordillo Escamilla

21 July 2021 Friendly	Valencia	3–0	Atromitos	Paterna, Valencia
19:00 CEST (UTC+2)	Vallejo 13'; Jason 20'; Guedes 69'	Report		Stadium: Ciudad Deportiva de Paterna; Attendance: 0 Referee: Andrés Fuentes Molina

24 July 2021 Friendly	Valencia	3–2	Cartagena	Paterna, Valencia
19:00 CEST (UTC+2)	Cheryshev 56'; Alderete 60'; Jason 66' (pen.)	Report	Castro 48'; Martínez 80'	Stadium: Ciudad Deportiva de Paterna; Attendance: 0 Referee: Iván Muñoz Pérez

28 July 2021 Friendly	Valencia	0–2	Zaragoza	Paterna, Valencia
18:45 CEST (UTC+2)		Report	Narváez 19'; Gámez 44'	Stadium: Pinatar Arena; Attendance: 0 Referee: Pedro Campoy Candela

30 July 2021 Friendly	Valencia	1–0	Levante	Paterna, Valencia
19:00 CEST (UTC+2)	Alderete 71'; Burlamaqui (yellow card) 72'; Menargues (yellow card) 89'	Report	Radoja (yellow card) 27'; Vezo (yellow card) 47'; Malsa (red card) 56'; Postigo (yellow card) 81'	Stadium: Ciudad Deportiva de Paterna; Attendance: 0 Referee: Saúl Ais Reig

4 August 2021 Orange Trophy	Valencia	0–0 (5–3 p)	Milan	Valencia
20:30 CEST (UTC+2)	Correia (yellow card) 60'	Report	Krunić (yellow card) 84'; Gabbia (yellow card) 90+1'	Stadium: Mestalla; Attendance: 3,000; Referee: Mario Melero López
	Penalties
	Vallejo (penalty scored); Gómez (penalty scored); Guedes (penalty scored); Esquerdo (penalty scored); Guillamón (penalty scored)		(penalty scored) Giroud; (penalty scored) Calabria; (penalty missed) Krunić; (penalty scored) Rebić

7 August 2021 Friendly	Brentford	2–1	Valencia	Brentford, London
17:30 BST (UTC+1)	Pinnock 64'; Onyeka 71'	Report	López 30'	Stadium: Brentford Community Stadium; Referee: Robert Jones

== Competitions ==
=== Overall record ===
Competition	First match	Last match	Starting round	Final position	Record							
Competition	First match	Last match	Starting round	Final position	Pld	W	D	L	GF	GA	GD	Win %
La Liga	13 August 2021	21 May 2022	Matchday 1	9th	38	11	15	12	48	53	−5	28.95
Copa del Rey	2 December 2021	23 April 2022	First round	Runners-up	8	6	2	0	14	5	+9	75.00
Total					46	17	17	12	62	58	+4	36.96

Source: Soccerway

=== La Liga ===
==== League table ====
Pos	Team	Pld	W	D	L	GF	GA	GD	Pts	Qualification or relegation
7	Villarreal	38	16	11	11	63	37	+26	59	Qualification for the Europa Conference League play-off round (Note: Since the winners of the 2021–22 Copa del Rey, Real Betis, qualified for European competition based on league position, the Europa League berth awarded to the Copa del Rey winners was passed to the sixth-placed team, and the Europa Conference League berth awarded to the sixth-placed team was passed to the seventh-placed team.)
8	Athletic Bilbao	38	14	13	11	43	36	+7	55	
9	Valencia	38	11	15	12	48	53	−5	48	
10	Osasuna	38	12	11	15	37	51	−14	47	
11	Celta Vigo	38	12	10	16	43	43	0	46	

Source: LaLiga Santander
Rules for classification: 1) Points; 2) Head-to-head points; 3) Head-to-head goal difference; 4) Goal difference; 5) Goals scored; 6) Fair-play points (Note: Head-to-head record is used only after all the matches between the teams in question have been played)

==== Results summary ====
Overall								Home						Away					
Pld	W	D	L	GF	GA	GD	Pts	W	D	L	GF	GA	GD	W	D	L	GF	GA	GD
38	11	15	12	48	53	−5	48	6	8	5	26	24	+2	5	7	7	22	29	−7

Source: La Liga

==== Results by round ====
Round	1	2	3	4	5	6	7	8	9	10	11	12	13	14	15	16	17	18	19	20	21	22	23	24	25	26	27	28	29	30	31	32	33	34	35	36	37	38
Ground	H	A	H	A	H	A	H	A	A	H	A	H	H	A	H	A	H	A	H	A	H	A	H	A	H	A	H	A	A	H	A	H	A	H	A	H	A	H
Result	W	D	W	W	L	L	D	D	L	D	L	W	D	D	D	W	W	W	L	L	D	L	D	L	L	W	W	D	W	D	D	L	L	D	D	L	D	W
Position	6	6	3	4	3	5	8	8	10	10	11	10	10	10	11	8	7	7	9	10	9	10	11	12	12	9	9	9	9	9	9	10	10	10	10	10	11	9

Source: La Liga
A = Away; H = Home; W = Win; D = Draw; L = Loss

==== Matches ====
The league fixtures were announced on 30 June 2021.

13 August 2021 1	Valencia	1–0	Getafe	Valencia
21:00 CEST (UTC+2)	Guillamón (red card) 3'; Soler 11' (pen.), (yellow card) 50'; Wass (yellow card) 13'; Gómez (yellow card) 58'; Gayà (yellow card) 70'; Jason (yellow card) 90+2'; Alderete (yellow card) 90+7'	Report	Olivera (yellow card) 31'; Cabaco (yellow card) 38' (yellow-red card) 76'	Stadium: Mestalla; Attendance: 9,868; Referee: Jesús Gil Manzano

21 August 2021 2	Granada	1–1	Valencia	Granada
19:30 CEST (UTC+2)	Suárez 16'; Monchu (yellow card) 45'; Duarte (yellow card) 45+3'; Sánchez (yellow card) 49'	Report	Alderete (yellow card) 65'; Correia (yellow card) 81'; Soler 88' (pen.)	Stadium: Nuevo Los Cármenes; Attendance: 6,267; Referee: Carlos del Cerro Grande

27 August 2021 3	Valencia	3–0	Alavés	Valencia
22:15 CEST (UTC+2)	Wass 3'; Soler 45+3'; Guedes 60'; Diakhaby (yellow card) 86'	Report	Lejeune (yellow card) 28'; Loum (yellow card) 45'; Pacheco (yellow card) 61'; Miazga (yellow card) 61'	Stadium: Mestalla; Attendance: 10,627; Referee: Miguel Ángel Ortiz Arias

12 September 2021 4	Osasuna	1–4	Valencia	Pamplona
16:15 CEST (UTC+2)	Moncayola 8', (yellow card) 89'; Torró (yellow card) 33'; D. García (yellow card) 57'; Herrera (yellow card) 75'	Report	Gómez 26'; Soler (yellow card) 28'; Aridane 51' (o.g.); Guedes 55'; Alderete 73', (yellow card) 81'	Stadium: El Sadar; Attendance: 13,940; Referee: Ricardo de Burgos Bengoetxea

19 September 2021 5	Valencia	1–2	Real Madrid	Valencia
21:00 CEST (UTC+2)	Gabriel (yellow card) 39'; Duro 66'	Report	Casemiro (yellow card) 45+4'; Nacho (yellow card) 56'; Rodrygo (yellow card) 81'; Vinícius 86', (yellow card) 90+2'; Benzema 88'; Camavinga (yellow card) 90+2'	Stadium: Mestalla; Attendance: 26,689; Referee: Pablo González Fuertes

22 September 2021 6	Sevilla	3–1	Valencia	Seville
19:30 CEST (UTC+2)	Gómez 3'; Montiel 15'; Lamela (yellow card) 17'; Mir 22', (yellow card) 35'; Montiel (yellow card) 30'; Jordán (yellow card) 51'; Gudelj (yellow card) 82'	Report	Lato (yellow card) 17'; Alderete (yellow card) 17'; Duro 31'; Diakhaby (yellow card) 68'	Stadium: Ramón Sánchez Pizjuán; Attendance: 23,654; Referee: José María Sánchez Martínez

25 September 2021 7	Valencia	1–1	Athletic Bilbao	Valencia
16:15 CEST (UTC+2)	Gómez (yellow card) 45+4' (yellow-red card) 82'; Guillamón (yellow card) 47'; Jason (yellow card) 90+2'; Marcos André 90+5'; Vallejo (yellow card) 90+8'	Report	D. García (yellow card) 49'; Martínez 69'; Berenguer (yellow card) 78'	Stadium: Mestalla; Attendance: 13,680; Referee: Alejandro Hernández Hernández

2 October 2021 8	Cádiz	0–0	Valencia	Cádiz
18:30 CEST (UTC+2)	Alarcón (yellow card) 41'; Calderón (yellow card) 72'; Alejo (yellow card) 83'	Report	Alderete (yellow card) 13'; Foulquier (yellow card) 46'; Guillamón (yellow card) 57'; Diakhaby (yellow card) 90+4'	Stadium: Ramón de Carranza; Attendance: 14,794; Referee: Valentín Pizarro Gómez

17 October 2021 9	Barcelona	3–1	Valencia	Barcelona
21:00 CEST (UTC+2)	Fati 13'; Gavi (yellow card) 20'; Busquets (yellow card) 32'; Depay 41' (pen.); Coutinho 85'	Report	Gayà 5', (yellow card) 39'; Foulquier (yellow card) 63'; Gómez (yellow card) 82'	Stadium: Camp Nou; Attendance: 47,317; Referee: Jesús Gil Manzano

23 October 2021 10	Valencia	2–2	Mallorca	Valencia
14:00 CEST (UTC+2)	Diakhaby (yellow card) 14'; Gómez (yellow card) 34'; Wass (yellow card) 52'; Guedes 90+3'; Vallejo (yellow card) 90+4'; Gayà 90+8'	Report	Lee (yellow card) 31' (yellow-red card) 55'; Ángel 32'; Diakhaby 38' (o.g.); Abdón (yellow card) 55'; Oliván (yellow card) 77'; Battaglia (yellow card) 90'	Stadium: Mestalla; Attendance: 29,139; Referee: Carlos del Cerro Grande

27 October 2021 11	Real Betis	4–1	Valencia	Seville
20:00 CEST (UTC+2)	Iglesias 14' (pen.), 30'; Ruiz (yellow card) 37'; Rodríguez (yellow card) 54'; Pezzella 61'; Juanmi 68'	Report	Alderete (yellow card) 12'; Gabriel 39'; Guillamón (yellow card) 49'; Guedes (yellow card) 70'; Foulquier (yellow card) 73'; Vallejo (yellow card) 77'	Stadium: Benito Villamarín; Attendance: 43,123; Referee: Isidro Díaz de Mera Escuderos

30 October 2021 12	Valencia	2–0	Villarreal	Valencia
18:30 CEST (UTC+2)	Guillamón 43', (yellow card) 47'; Alderete (yellow card) 63'; Soler 77' (pen.)	Report	Danjuma (yellow card) 53'; Trigueros (yellow card) 73'; Albiol (yellow card) 75'; Chukwueze (yellow card) 79'	Stadium: Mestalla; Attendance: 31,487; Referee: José Luis Munuera Montero

7 November 2021 13	Valencia	3–3	Atlético Madrid	Valencia
16:15 CET (UTC+1)	Savić 50' (o.g.); Guillamón (yellow card) 76'; Duro 90+2', 90+6'; Musah (yellow card) 90+4'	Report	Suárez 35'; Griezmann 58', (yellow card) 90+5'; Vrsaljko 60'; Carrasco (yellow card) 90'	Stadium: Mestalla; Attendance: 37,472; Referee: César Soto Grado

21 November 2021 14	Real Sociedad	0–0	Valencia	San Sebastián
21:00 CET (UTC+1)	Guevara (yellow card) 50'; Elustondo (red card) 76'; Rico (yellow card) 87'; Turrientes (yellow card) 90+2'; Gorosabel (yellow card) 90+6'	Report	Gayà (yellow card) 57'; Foulquier (yellow card) 70'; Wass (yellow card) 76'; Musah (yellow card) 84'; Koindredi (yellow card) 87'; Costa (yellow card) 90'; Alderete (yellow card) 90+4'	Stadium: Anoeta; Attendance: 28,635; Referee: Mario Melero López

27 November 2021 15	Valencia	1–1	Rayo Vallecano	Valencia
16:15 CET (UTC+1)	Soler 19' (pen.), (yellow card) 27'; Diakhaby (yellow card) 45'; Alderete (yellow card) 45+2'; Gayà (yellow card) 55'; Foulquier (yellow card) 62'; Wass (yellow card) 68'	Report	Saveljich (yellow card) 18'; Comesaña (yellow card) 54'; Palazón (yellow card) 55', (goal) 64'; Catena (yellow card) 73'; Valentín (yellow card) 75'	Stadium: Mestalla; Attendance: 30,030; Referee: Alejandro Hernández Hernández

5 December 2021 16	Celta Vigo	1–2	Valencia	Vigo
21:00 CET (UTC+1)	Beltrán (yellow card) 9'; Aspas 11', (yellow card) 12'; Nolito (yellow card) 90+6'	Report	Duro 19'; Gómez (yellow card) 36', (goal) 53'; Gayà (yellow card) 51'	Stadium: Balaídos; Attendance: 11,361; Referee: Ricardo de Burgos Bengoetxea

11 December 2021 17	Valencia	2–1	Elche	Valencia
18:30 CET (UTC+1)	Guedes 23'; Gómez (yellow card) 34'; Wass (yellow card) 48'; Piccini 86'; Foulquier (yellow card) 90+2'	Report	Morente (yellow card) 41'; Boyé 75'; Roco (yellow card) 90+2'	Stadium: Mestalla; Attendance: 31,662; Referee: Santiago Jaime Latre

20 December 2021 18	Levante	3–4	Valencia	Valencia
21:00 CET (UTC+1)	Campaña (penalty missed) 21', 21'; Pepelu (yellow card) 23'; Roger 24'; Morales (yellow card) 58'; Soldado (yellow card) 90'; Bardhi 90+1'	Report	Diakhaby (yellow card) 20'; Guedes 44', 85'; Soler 50' (pen.), 72'; Račić (yellow card) 60'; Iranzo (yellow card) 80'; Costa (yellow card) 88'	Stadium: Ciutat de València; Attendance: 18,851; Referee: Pablo González Fuertes

31 December 2021 19	Valencia	1–2	Espanyol	Valencia
16:15 CET (UTC+1)	Correia (yellow card) 12'; Guedes (yellow card) 19'; Alderete 51'; Wass (yellow card) 63'; Iranzo (yellow card) 78'; Duro (yellow card) 79' (yellow-red card) 83'; Cillessen (yellow card) 90+6'	Report	Melamed (yellow card) 30'; Gil (yellow card) 79'; De Tomás 83' (pen.); Puado 88'	Stadium: Mestalla; Attendance: 29,566; Referee: José María Sánchez Martínez

8 January 2022 20	Real Madrid	4–1	Valencia	Madrid
21:00 CET (UTC+1)	Casemiro (yellow card) 14'; Militão (yellow card) 26'; Benzema 43' (pen.), 88'; Vinícius 52', 61'; Mendy (yellow card) 75'	Report	Piccini (yellow card) 51'; Musah (yellow card) 58'; Guedes (penalty missed) 76', 76'; Cheryshev (yellow card) 58'	Stadium: Santiago Bernabéu; Attendance: 40,617; Referee: Alejandro Hernández Hernández

19 January 2022 21	Valencia	1–1	Sevilla	Valencia
21:30 CET (UTC+1)	Guedes 44'; Gayà (yellow card) 45+2' (yellow-red card) 89'; Lato (yellow card) 86'	Report	Diakhaby 7' (o.g.); Acuña (yellow card) 45+2'; Montiel (yellow card) 45+4'; Torres (yellow card) 90+4'	Stadium: Mestalla; Attendance: 26,049; Referee: César Soto Grado

22 January 2022 22	Atlético Madrid	3–2	Valencia	Madrid
21:00 CET (UTC+1)	Koke (yellow card) 27'; Hermoso (yellow card) 37', (goal) 90+3'; Cunha 64'; Suárez (yellow card) 82'; Herrera (yellow card) 84'; Correa 90+1'; Giménez (yellow card) 90+3'	Report	Correia (yellow card) 14'; Musah 25', (yellow card) 43'; Foulquier (yellow card) 37'; Duro 44'; Guillamón (yellow card) 62'; Lato (yellow card) 65'; Doménech (yellow card) 83'	Stadium: Wanda Metropolitano; Attendance: 44,999; Referee: Isidro Díaz de Mera Escuderos

6 February 2022 23	Valencia	0–0	Real Sociedad	Valencia
14:00 CET (UTC+1)	Mosquera (yellow card) 26'; Moriba (yellow card) 37'; Guillamón (yellow card) 79'; Račić (yellow card) 90'	Report	Zubimendi (yellow card) 31'; Zubeldia (yellow card) 50'	Stadium: Mestalla; Attendance: 31,351; Referee: José María Sánchez Martínez

13 February 2022 24	Alavés	2–1	Valencia	Vitoria-Gasteiz
14:00 CET (UTC+1)	Loum 14'; Tenaglia (yellow card) 37'; Pina (yellow card) 45+2'; Escalante (yellow card) 61'; Joselu 76' (pen.); Laguardia (yellow card) 90+7'	Report	Guedes 62' (pen.); Diakhaby (yellow card) 76'; Lato (yellow card) 84'; Gil (yellow card) 88'	Stadium: Mendizorrotza; Attendance: 12,845; Referee: Adrián Cordero Vega

20 February 2022 25	Valencia	1–4	Barcelona	Valencia
16:15 CET (UTC+1)	Soler 53', (yellow card) 76'; Moriba (yellow card) 53'; Duro (yellow card) 56'; Lato (yellow card) 76'	Report	Aubameyang 23', 38', 63'; F. de Jong 32'; Alba (yellow card) 35'; Araújo (yellow card) 56'; Nico (yellow card) 72'; Dest (yellow card) 90+3'	Stadium: Mestalla; Attendance: 38,315; Referee: Carlos del Cerro Grande

26 February 2022 26	Mallorca	0–1	Valencia	Palma
14:00 CET (UTC+1)	Kubo (yellow card) 16'; Valjent (yellow card) 71'; Costa (yellow card) 84'; Raíllo (yellow card) 90+2'	Report	Gabriel 4'; Gil (yellow card) 19'; Alderete (yellow card) 23'; Diakhaby (yellow card) 26'; Mamardashvili (yellow card) 42'; Moriba (yellow card) 88' (yellow-red card) 90+2'	Stadium: Visit Mallorca Stadium; Attendance: 14,417; Referee: Jorge Figueroa Vázquez

5 March 2022 27	Valencia	3–1	Granada	Valencia
18:30 CET (UTC+1)	Cömert (yellow card) 27'; Musah (yellow card) 34'; Guedes 48'; Gómez 51'; Soler 62' (pen.); Marcos André (yellow card) 69'	Report	Doménech 56' (o.g.); Díaz (yellow card) 63'; Rochina (yellow card) 79'; Quini (yellow card) 88'	Stadium: Mestalla; Attendance: 31,227; Referee: Valentín Pizarro Gómez

12 March 2022 28	Getafe	0–0	Valencia	Getafe
21:00 CET (UTC+1)	Sandro (yellow card) 39'; Aleñá (yellow card) 49'; Mayoral (yellow card) 73'; Mata (yellow card) 80'; Maksimović (yellow card) 90+2'; Olivera (yellow card) 90+4'	Report	Alderete (yellow card) 31'; Guillamón (yellow card) 82'; Moriba (yellow card) 87'; Foulquier (yellow card) 90+4'; Costa (yellow card) 90+5'	Stadium: Coliseum Alfonso Pérez; Attendance: 10,349; Referee: Guillermo Cuadra Fernández

19 March 2022 29	Elche	0–1	Valencia	Elche
16:15 CET (UTC+1)	Barragán (yellow card) 8'; Verdú (yellow card) 45+1'; Mojica (red card) 90+2'; Fidel (yellow card) 90+3'	Report	Foulquier (yellow card) 27'; Diakhaby (yellow card) 40'; Guedes 50'; Gil (yellow card) 65'	Stadium: Estadio Manuel Martínez Valero; Attendance: 15,780; Referee: Miguel Ángel Ortiz Arias

3 April 2022 30	Valencia	0–0	Cádiz	Valencia
18:30 CEST (UTC+2)	Alderete (yellow card) 60'; Gabriel (yellow card) 67'; Diakhaby (yellow card) 90+6'	Report	San Emeterio (yellow card) 33'; Alejo (yellow card) 58'; Alcaraz (yellow card) 77'; José Mari (yellow card) 86' (yellow-red card) 90+6'; Lozano (yellow card) 87'	Stadium: Mestalla; Attendance: 32,949; Referee: Isidro Díaz de Mera Escuderos

11 April 2022 31	Rayo Vallecano	1–1	Valencia	Madrid
21:00 CEST (UTC+2)	López (yellow card) 5'; Guardiola 83'; Balliu (yellow card) 90+3'; Catena (yellow card) 90+9'	Report	Moriba (yellow card) 8'; Duro (yellow card) 42'; Soler 57'; Marcos André (yellow card) 74'; Correia (yellow card) 90+9'	Stadium: Campo de Fútbol de Vallecas; Attendance: 9,302; Referee: Ricardo de Burgos Bengoetxea

16 April 2022 32	Valencia	1–2	Osasuna	Valencia
18:30 CEST (UTC+2)	Foulquier (yellow card) 28'; Soler 83' (pen.); Gayà (yellow card) 90+8'	Report	Oier (yellow card) 17'; Torró (yellow card) 23'; Ávila 50' (pen.); Budimir 74'	Stadium: Mestalla; Attendance: 30,148; Referee: Mario Melero López

19 April 2022 33	Villarreal	2–0	Valencia	Villarreal
21:30 CEST (UTC+2)	Danjuma 10' (pen.), 17'; Trigueros (yellow card) 75'; Aurier (yellow card) 84'	Report	Cömert (yellow card) 9'; Marcos André (yellow card) 40'; Moriba (yellow card) 66'	Stadium: Estadio de la Cerámica; Attendance: 13,570; Referee: José Luis Munuera Montero

30 April 2022 34	Valencia	1–1	Levante	Valencia
18:30 CEST (UTC+2)	Guedes (yellow card) 23'; Duro 27'; Gayà (red card) 31'; Alderete (yellow card) 38'; Mamardashvili (yellow card) 70'; Guillamón (yellow card) 84'	Report	Radoja (yellow card) 36'; Son (yellow card) 38'; Duarte 81', (yellow card) 85'	Stadium: Mestalla; Attendance: 35,099; Referee: Jorge Figueroa Vázquez

7 May 2022 35	Athletic Bilbao	0–0	Valencia	Bilbao
16:15 CEST (UTC+2)	Yeray (yellow card) 8'; I. Williams (yellow card) 77'; De Marcos (yellow card) 88'; Simón (yellow card) 90+9'	Report	Diakhaby (yellow card) 26'; Moriba (yellow card) 53'; Guillamón (yellow card) 72' (yellow-red card) 90+8'	Stadium: San Mamés; Attendance: 41,091; Referee: Isidro Díaz De Mera Escuderos

10 May 2022 36	Valencia	0–3	Real Betis	Valencia
19:00 CEST (UTC+2)	Alderete (yellow card) 31'	Report	Canales (yellow card) 45', (goal) 87'; Willian José 57'; Rodri (yellow card) 60'; Bartra (yellow card) 83'; Iglesias 90'	Stadium: Mestalla; Attendance: 28,091; Referee: Carlos del Cerro Grande

14 May 2022 37	Espanyol	1–1	Valencia	Cornellà de Llobregat
18:30 CEST (UTC+2)	Mérida (yellow card) 3'; De Tomás (yellow card) 45', (goal) 45+2'; Darder (yellow card) 70'; Vilà (yellow card) 90+2'	Report	Gómez 37'; Alderete (yellow card) 90+2'	Stadium: RCDE Stadium; Attendance: 14,990; Referee: Alejandro Muñiz Ruiz

21 May 2022 38	Valencia	2–0	Celta Vigo	Valencia
17:30 CEST (UTC+2)	Gómez 28'; Araujo 60' (o.g.); Foulquier (yellow card) 64'; Correia (yellow card) 65'; Moriba (yellow card) 90+5'	Report	Galán (yellow card) 45+1'; Méndez (yellow card) 52'; Galhardo (yellow card) 79'	Stadium: Mestalla; Attendance: 16,189; Referee: Adrián Cordero Vega

=== Copa del Rey ===
2 December 2021 First round	Utrillas	0–3	Valencia	Utrillas
19:30 CET (UTC+1)	Fleta (yellow card) 50'; Pandiella (yellow card) 69'	Report	Marcos André 27'; Cheryshev (penalty missed) 52'; Musah 52'; Koindredi 70'	Stadium: La Vega; Referee: César Soto Grado

16 December 2021 Second round	Arenteiro	1–3 (a.e.t.)	Valencia	O Carballiño
19:00 CET (UTC+1)	Magisano 8'; Fernández (yellow card) 33'; Cruz (yellow card) 90+4'; Eimil (yellow card) 108'	Report	Musah 1'; Diakhaby (yellow card) 14'; Račić (yellow card) 20'; Marcos André (yellow card) 33'; Guillamón (yellow card) 70', (goal) 99'; Vallejo 113'	Stadium: Espiñedo; Referee: José Luis Munuera Montero

5 January 2022 Round of 32	Cartagena	1–2	Valencia	Cartagena
16:00 CET (UTC+1)	Boateng (yellow card) 37'; P. Vázquez (yellow card) 45+3'; Bodiger (yellow card) 62'; Gallar (yellow card) 71'; Ortuño 75' (pen.); Neskes (yellow card) 80'	Report	Soler 35'; Diakhaby (yellow card) 45+1'; J. Vázquez (yellow card) 73'; Cheryshev 90+2'	Stadium: Cartagonova; Attendance: 10,773; Referee: Pablo González Fuertes

16 January 2022 Round of 16	Atlético Baleares	0–1	Valencia	Palma
12:00 CET (UTC+1)	Ferrone (yellow card) 57'; Dioni (yellow card) 85'	Report	Marcos André 1'; Guillamón (yellow card) 55'; Račić (yellow card) 56'; Musah (yellow card) 90+4'	Stadium: Estadio Balear; Referee: Pablo González Fuertes

2 February 2022 Quarter-finals	Valencia	2–1	Cádiz	Valencia
21:00 CET (UTC+1)	Guedes 24'; Gayà (yellow card) 34'; Cömert (yellow card) 53'; Duro 79'; Gómez (yellow card) 87'	Report	Alejo (yellow card) 38'; Pérez 54' (pen.); Alcaraz (yellow card) 59'; Sobrino (yellow card) 61'; Cala (yellow card) 71' (yellow-red card) 84'; Parra (yellow card) 87'	Stadium: Mestalla; Attendance: 30,591; Referee: Javier Alberola Rojas

10 February 2022 Semi-finals; First leg	Athletic Bilbao	1–1	Valencia	Bilbao
21:30 CET (UTC+1)	R. García 37'; D. García (yellow card) 63'	Report	Foulquier (yellow card) 43'; Gómez (red card) 45+3'; Duro 65', (yellow card) 90'; Diakhaby (yellow card) 79'	Stadium: San Mamés; Attendance: 42,906; Referee: José Luis Munuera Montero

2 March 2022 Semi-finals; Second leg	Valencia	1–0 (2–1 agg.)	Athletic Bilbao	Valencia
21:30 CET (UTC+1)	Gabriel (yellow card) 26'; Guedes 43'; Alderete (yellow card) 74'; Diakhaby (yellow card) 90+2'	Report	Martínez (yellow card) 60'; Zarraga (yellow card) 90+5'	Stadium: Mestalla; Attendance: 41,731; Referee: Jesús Gil Manzano

23 April 2022 Final	Real Betis	1–1 (a.e.t.) (5–4 p)	Valencia	Seville
22:00 CEST (UTC+2)	Iglesias 11', (yellow card) 95'; Carvalho (yellow card) 14'; Pezzella (yellow card) 72'; Tello (yellow card) 113'	Report	Gabriel (yellow card) 5'; Duro 30'; Guillamón (yellow card) 74'; Alderete (yellow card) 90+2'; Correia (yellow card) 90+3'; Soler (yellow card) 98'	Stadium: La Cartuja; Attendance: 53,387; Referee: Alejandro Hernández Hernández
	Penalties
	Willian José (penalty scored); Joaquín (penalty scored); Guardado (penalty scored); Tello (penalty scored); Miranda (penalty scored)		(penalty scored) Soler; (penalty scored) Račić; (penalty scored) Guedes; (penalty missed) Musah; (penalty scored) Gayà

== Statistics ==
=== Appearances and goals ===
Last updated 21 May 2022

No.	Pos	Nat	Player	Total		La Liga		Copa del Rey	
No.	Pos	Nat	Player	Apps	Goals	Apps	Goals	Apps	Goals
Goalkeepers
1	GK	(Spain) ESP	Jaume Doménech	8	0	3	0	5	0
13	GK	(Netherlands) NED	Jasper Cillessen	17	0	17	0	0	0
28	GK	(Georgia (country)) GEO	Giorgi Mamardashvili	21	0	18	0	3	0
Defenders
2	DF	(Portugal) POR	Thierry Correia	22	0	18+1	0	2+1	0
3	DF	(Spain) ESP	Toni Lato	16	0	7+4	0	0+5	0
5	DF	(Brazil) BRA	Gabriel	21	2	19	2	2	0
6	DF	(Spain) ESP	Hugo Guillamón	37	2	28+3	1	4+2	1
12	DF	(France) FRA	Mouctar Diakhaby	37	0	21+8	0	8	0
14	DF	(Spain) ESP	José Gayà	31	2	22+2	2	6+1	0
15	DF	(Paraguay) PAR	Omar Alderete	34	2	28+1	2	4+1	0
20	DF	(Guadeloupe) GLP	Dimitri Foulquier	36	0	25+4	0	6+1	0
24	DF	(Switzerland) SUI	Eray Cömert	9	0	5+3	0	1	0
32	DF	(Spain) ESP	Jesús Vázquez	17	0	8+7	0	2	0
37	DF	(Spain) ESP	Cristhian Mosquera	7	0	3+3	0	1	0
38	DF	(Spain) ESP	César Tárrega	2	0	0	0	2	0
39	DF	(Spain) ESP	Rubén Iranzo	4	0	1+3	0	0	0
Midfielders
4	MF	(United States) USA	Yunus Musah	36	3	13+16	1	4+3	2
8	MF	(Serbia) SRB	Uroš Račić	34	0	13+15	0	4+2	0
10	MF	(Spain) ESP	Carlos Soler	38	12	28+4	11	5+1	1
17	MF	(Russia) RUS	Denis Cheryshev	20	1	5+12	0	2+1	1
23	MF	(Guinea) GUI	Ilaix Moriba	18	0	9+5	0	3+1	0
27	MF	(France) FRA	Koba Koindredi	13	0	1+9	0	2+1	0
30	MF	(Spain) ESP	Javi Guerra	1	0	0	0	0+1	0
44	MF	(Spain) ESP	Jesús Santiago	3	0	0+3	0	0	0
46	MF	(Spain) ESP	Mario Domínguez	2	0	0+2	0	0	0
Forwards
7	FW	(Portugal) POR	Gonçalo Guedes	42	13	30+6	11	4+2	2
9	FW	(Uruguay) URU	Maxi Gómez	32	5	21+8	5	2+1	0
11	FW	(Angola) ANG	Hélder Costa	27	0	13+9	0	1+4	0
19	FW	(Spain) ESP	Hugo Duro	36	10	22+8	7	6	3
21	FW	(Spain) ESP	Bryan Gil	17	0	9+4	0	3+1	0
22	FW	(Brazil) BRA	Marcos André	35	3	8+21	1	4+2	2
Players who have made an appearance or had a squad number this season but have been loaned out or transferred
18	MF	(Denmark) DEN	Daniel Wass	21	1	19	1	2	0
16	MF	(Spain) ESP	Álex Blanco	0	0	0	0	0	0
21	FW	(Spain) ESP	Manu Vallejo	10	1	0+8	0	0+2	1
23	MF	(Spain) ESP	Jason	7	0	1+4	0	0+2	0
24	DF	(Italy) ITA	Cristiano Piccini	8	1	3+3	1	0+2	0
25	GK	(Spain) ESP	Cristian Rivero	0	0	0	0	0	0
11	FW	(Spain) ESP	Rubén Sobrino	1	0	0+1	0	0	0

=== Goalscorers ===
As of 2 February 2022

Rank	No.	Pos.	Nat.	Name	La Liga	Copa del Rey	Total
1	7	FW	(Portugal)	Gonçalo Guedes	8	1	9
2	10	MF	(Spain)	Carlos Soler	7	1	8
3	19	FW	(Spain)	Hugo Duro	6	1	7
4	22	FW	(Brazil)	Marcos André	1	2	3
4	4	MF	(United States)	Yunus Musah	1	2	3
6	14	DF	(Spain)	José Gayà	2	0	2
6	9	FW	(Uruguay)	Maxi Gómez	2	0	2
6	15	DF	(Paraguay)	Omar Alderete	2	0	2
6	6	DF	(Spain)	Hugo Guillamón	1	1	2
10	5	DF	(Brazil)	Gabriel Paulista	1	0	1
10	18	MF	(Denmark)	Daniel Wass	1	0	1
10	21	DF	(Italy)	Cristiano Piccini	1	0	1
10	17	MF	(Russia)	Denis Cheryshev	0	1	1
10	27	MF	(France)	Koba Koindredi	0	1	1
10	21	FW	(Spain)	Manu Vallejo	0	1	1
Own goals					2	0	2
Totals					35	11	46
