= Cristian Rivero (footballer) =

Spanish footballer (born 1998)

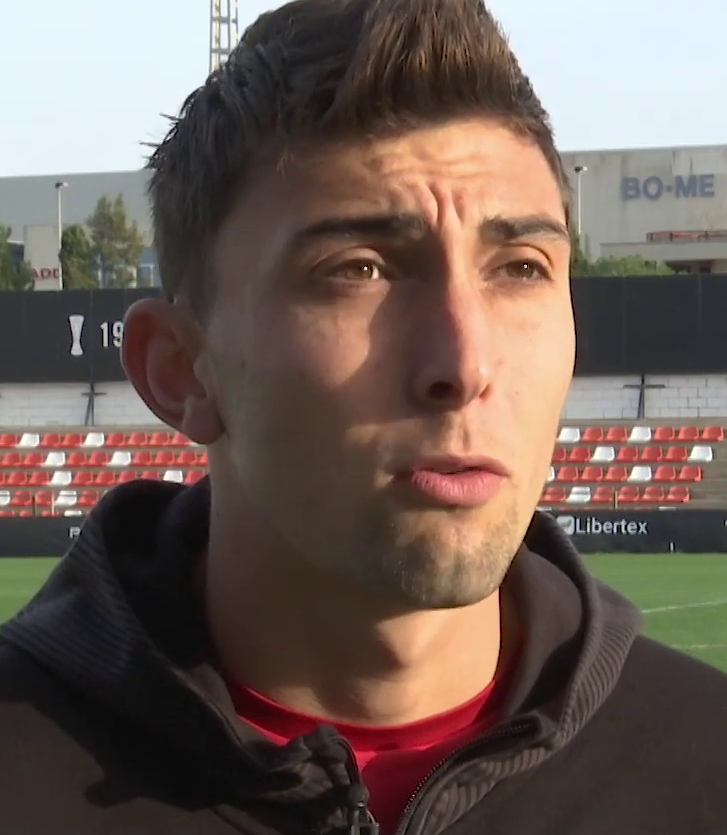
- Rivero in 2019

Personal information
- Full name: Cristian Rivero Sabater
- Date of birth: 21 March 1998 (age 28)
- Place of birth: Gandia, Spain
- Height: 1.88 m (6 ft 2 in)
- Position: Goalkeeper

Team information
- Current team: Valencia
- Number: 13

Youth career
- Portuarios Disarp
- 2007–2017: Valencia

Senior career*
Years	Team	Apps	(Gls)
2017–2020	Valencia B	80	(0)
2020–	Valencia	1	(0)
2022	→ Alcorcón (loan)	3	(0)
2024–2025	→ Albacete (loan)	6	(0)
- * Club domestic league appearances and goals as of 1 June 2025

Cristian Rivero Sabater (born 21 March 1998) is a Spanish professional footballer who plays as a goalkeeper for Valencia CF.

== Club career ==
Born in Gandia, Valencian Community, Rivero joined Valencia CF's youth setup in 2007 at the age of nine, from UD Portuarios Disarp. He made his senior debut with the reserves on 20 August 2017, starting in a 2–0 Segunda División away win against Deportivo Aragón.

Rivero immediately became an undisputed starter for the B-team, and renewed his contract until 2022 on 20 December 2019. For the 2020–21 season, he was definitely promoted to the main squad after the injury of Jasper Cillessen.

Rivero made his first team debut on 16 December 2020, starting in a 4–2 away win against Terrassa FC in the first round of the season's Copa del Rey. His professional debut occurred the following 17 January, as he played the full 90 minutes in a 2–0 away defeat of AD Alcorcón, in the last 16 of the national cup.

On 2 June 2021, Rivero renewed his contract with the Che until 2024. Despite renewing, he became a fourth-choice option behind Jasper Cillessen, Jaume Doménech and new signing Giorgi Mamardashvili.

On 28 January 2022, after a failed loan move to FC Dallas, Rivero joined Segunda División side Alcorcón on loan for the remainder of the campaign. He played only three games, with Dani Jiménez preferred. While Cillessen left that summer, the addition of Iago Herrerín kept Rivero at fourth choice.

Rivero made his La Liga debut on 5 May 2024, replacing Jaume Doménech in a 1–0 home loss to Deportivo Alavés. On 5 July, he renewed his contract until 2026 and was loaned to second division side Albacete Balompié for the 2024–25 season.

== Career statistics ==
As of match played 1 June 2025

Appearances and goals by club, season and competition
Club	Season	League			Cup		Europe		Other		Total	
Club	Season	Division	Apps	Goals	Apps	Goals	Apps	Goals	Apps	Goals	Apps	Goals
Valencia B	2016–17	Segunda División B	0	0	—		—		0	0	0	0
Valencia B	2017–18	Segunda División B	32	0	—		—		—		32	0
Valencia B	2018–19	Segunda División B	26	0	—		—		—		26	0
Valencia B	2019–20	Segunda División B	22	0	—		—		—		22	0
Valencia B	Total		80	0	—		—		—		80	0
Valencia	2017–18	La Liga	0	0	0	0	—		—		0	0
Valencia	2018–19	La Liga	0	0	0	0	0	0	—		0	0
Valencia	2019–20	La Liga	0	0	0	0	0	0	0	0	0	0
Valencia	2020–21	La Liga	0	0	4	0	—		—		4	0
Valencia	2021–22	La Liga	0	0	0	0	—		—		0	0
Valencia	2022–23	La Liga	0	0	0	0	—		0	0	0	0
Valencia	2023–24	La Liga	1	0	0	0	—		—		1	0
Valencia	2025–26	La Liga	0	0	0	0	—		—		0	0
Valencia	2026–27	La Liga	0	0	0	0	—		—		0	0
Valencia	Total		1	0	4	0	0	0	0	0	5	0
Alcorcón (loan)	2021–22	Segunda División	3	0	—		—		—		3	0
Albacete (loan)	2024–25	Segunda División	6	0	1	0	—		—		7	0
Career total			90	0	5	0	0	0	0	0	95	0
