= Cristian Rivero =

Cristian Rivero may refer to:

- Cristian Rivero (actor) (born 1978), Peruvian actor
- Cristian Rivero (footballer) (born 1998), Spanish footballer

== See also ==
- Cristian Riveros, (born 1982), a Paraguayan footballer
