= Rubén Iranzo =

Spanish footballer (born 2003)

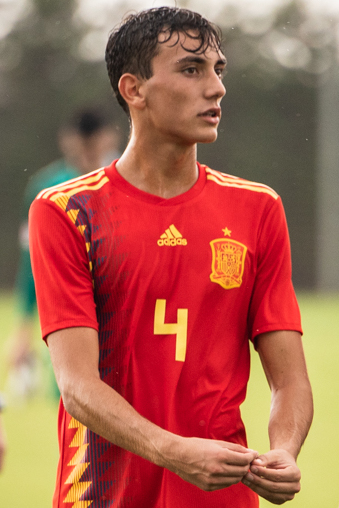
- Iranzo in October 2019

Personal information
- Full name: Rubén Iranzo Lendínez
- Date of birth: 14 March 2003 (age 23)
- Place of birth: Picanya, Spain
- Height: 1.82 m (6 ft 0 in)
- Position: Centre back

Team information
- Current team: Zaragoza
- Number: 14

Youth career
- Javi Garrido Torrent
- 2011–2021: Valencia

Senior career*
Years	Team	Apps	(Gls)
2021–2026	Valencia B	99	(2)
2021–2026	Valencia	6	(0)
2026–	Zaragoza	0	(0)

International career^{‡}
2019	Spain U16	6	(0)
2019	Spain U17	7	(1)
2019–	Spain U18	2	(0)
2021–2022	Spain U19	5	(0)
- * Club domestic league appearances and goals as of 15 May 2026 ‡ National team caps and goals as of 23 February 2022

Rubén "Rubo" Iranzo Lendínez (born 14 March 2003) is a Spanish professional footballer who plays as a central defender for Real Zaragoza.

== Club career ==
Iranzo was born in Picanya, Valencian Community, and joined Valencia CF's youth setup in 2011, from Javi Garrido de Torrent CF. On 8 June 2021, after finishing his formation, he signed his first professional contract until 2025, and was promoted to the reserves in Tercera División RFEF.

Iranzo made his senior debut on 18 September 2021, coming on as a late substitute in a 4–0 home routing of CD Olímpic de Xàtiva. On 20 December, he made his first team – and La Liga – debut, replacing Cristiano Piccini in a 4–3 away win over rivals Levante UD.

On 26 August 2026, Iranzo signed a three-year contract with Primera Federación side Real Zaragoza.

== International career ==
Iranzo represented Spain at under-16, under-17, under-18 and under-19 levels.

== Career statistics ==
=== Club ===
As of match played 26 May 2024

Appearances and goals by club, season and competition
Club	Season	League			Copa del Rey		Other		Total	
Club	Season	Division	Apps	Goals	Apps	Goals	Apps	Goals	Apps	Goals
Valencia B	2021–22	Tercera División RFEF	17	0	—		—		17	0
Valencia B	2022–23	Segunda Federación	26	1	—		2 (Note: Appearances in 2023 Segunda Federación play-offs)	0	28	1
Valencia B	2023–24	Segunda Federación	23	1	—		—		23	1
Valencia B	Total		66	2	—		2	0	68	2
Valencia	2021–22	La Liga	4	0	0	0	—		4	0
Valencia	2022–23	La Liga	0	0	1	0	0	0	1	0
Valencia	2023–24	La Liga	1	0	1	0	—		2	0
Valencia	Total		5	0	2	0	0	0	7	0
Career total			71	2	2	0	2	0	75	2
