= Toni Lato =

Spanish footballer (born 1997)

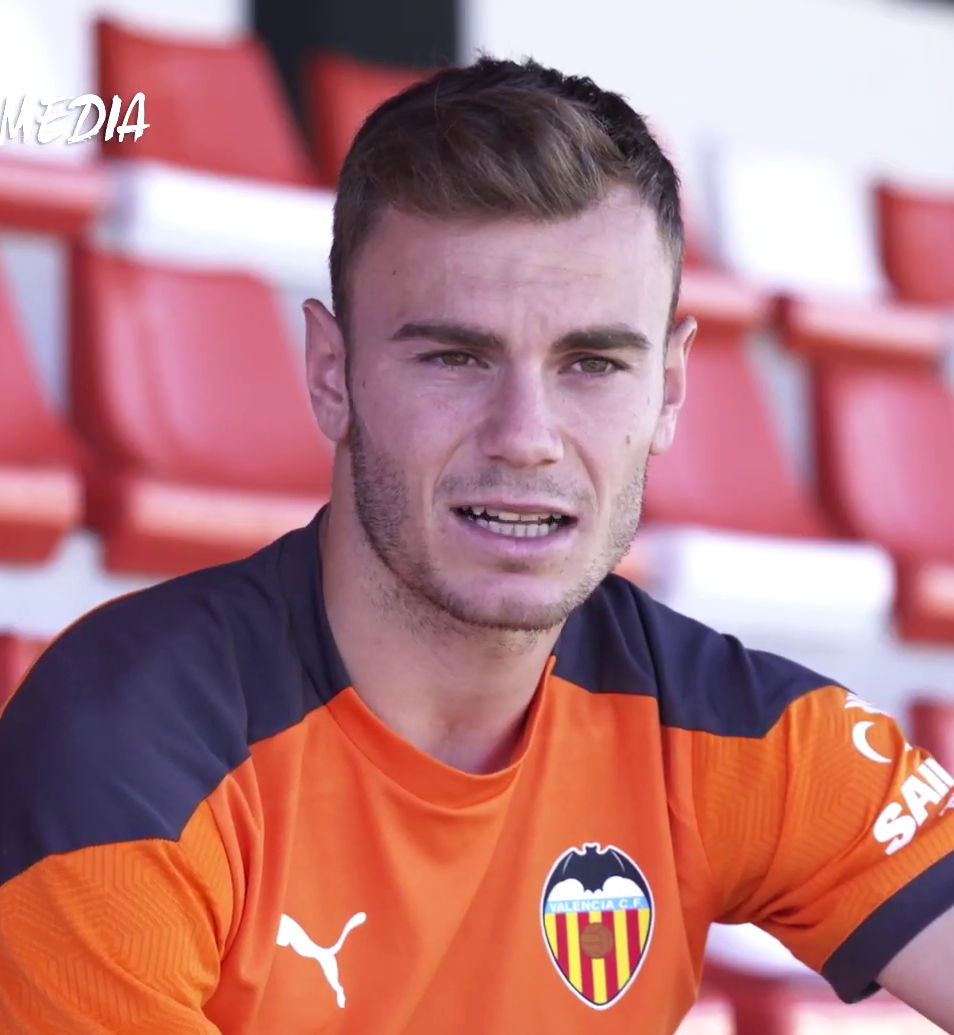
- Lato in 2020

Personal information
- Full name: Antonio Latorre Grueso
- Date of birth: 21 November 1997 (age 28)
- Place of birth: Pobla de Vallbona, Spain
- Height: 1.71 m (5 ft 7 in)
- Position: Left-back

Team information
- Current team: Mallorca
- Number: 3

Youth career
- Valencia

Senior career*
Years	Team	Apps	(Gls)
2014–2017	Valencia B	34	(0)
2016–2023	Valencia	78	(2)
2019	→ PSV (loan)	0	(0)
2020	→ Jong PSV (loan)	2	(0)
2020	→ Osasuna (loan)	8	(1)
2023–	Mallorca	62	(0)

International career
2015	Spain U18	1	(1)
2016	Spain U19	4	(0)
2017–2018	Spain U21	4	(0)
- * Club domestic league appearances and goals as of 24 October 2026

Antonio Latorre Grueso (born 21 November 1997), known as Toni Lato or simply Lato, is a Spanish professional footballer who plays as a left-back for La Liga club Mallorca.

Formed at Valencia, he made over 90 appearances for the club, winning the Copa del Rey in 2019 and also featuring on loan at Osasuna in La Liga.

== Club career ==
Born in La Pobla de Vallbona, Valencia, Lato was a Valencia CF youth graduate. He made his debut as a senior with the reserves on 29 March 2014, coming on as a second-half substitute in a 0–0 home draw against Elche CF Ilicitano.

On 25 June 2015, Lato signed a new contract with the Che, agreeing to a five-year deal and being definitely promoted to the B-team. On 6 January of the following year he was first included in a first team matchday, remaining unused in a 4–0 home win against Granada CF for the season's Copa del Rey last 16. He made his first team debut on 25 February 2016, replacing fellow youth graduate José Luis Gayà at half time in a 4–0 UEFA Europa League away routing of SK Rapid Wien; his first La Liga game was the following 9 January, when he came on as a half-time substitute for Guilherme Siqueira in a 3–3 draw against CA Osasuna.

Lato scored his first competitive goal for the Che on 18 April 2019, netting the first in a 2–0 home defeat of Villarreal CF for the season's Europa League, helping his team qualify for the semifinals as a result. He was unused on 25 May as the team beat league champions FC Barcelona 2–1 in the 2019 Copa del Rey Final. On 5 July, he signed a contract extension with Valencia until 2023; his release clause was set at €80 million.

Immediately after signing the extension, Lato was loaned out to Eredivisie side PSV Eindhoven for one year. He left the club on 26 December, after playing just in the stoppage time of a 3–0 Europa League home win against Apollon Limassol and two appearances for the B-team in the Eerste Divisie; he was also publicly criticised by manager Mark van Bommel.

On the same day as leaving the Netherlands, Lato was loaned to Osasuna in the Spanish top tier, until the end of the season. He scored his first La Liga goal on 24 June by netting the game's only goal in an away defeat of Deportivo Alavés. On 23 October, he scored his first such goal for Valencia, consolation in a 2–1 loss at Elche CF; he continued to face competition not only from Gayà but from another academy product, Jesús Vázquez.

On 26 June 2023, Lato signed a four-year contract with fellow top tier side RCD Mallorca.

== Personal life ==
Lato's father, also named Antonio, and uncle Vicente were both footballers. The latter played mostly for Valencia's city rivals, Levante UD.

== Career statistics ==
=== Club ===
As of 24 October 2026

Appearances and goals by club, season and competition
Club	Season	League			Cup		Continental		Other		Total	
Club	Season	Division	Apps	Goals	Apps	Goals	Apps	Goals	Apps	Goals	Apps	Goals
Valencia B	2013–14	Segunda División B	1	0	–		–		–		1	0
Valencia B	2014–15	Segunda División B	1	0	–		–		–		1	0
Valencia B	2015–16	Segunda División B	10	0	–		–		–		10	0
Valencia B	2016–17	Segunda División B	22	0	–		–		6 (Note: Appearance(s) in Promotion Playoffs)	0	28	0
Valencia B	Total		34	0	0	0	0	0	6	0	40	0
Valencia	2015–16	La Liga	0	0	0	0	1 (Note: Appearance(s) in UEFA Europa League)	0	—		1	0
Valencia	2016–17	La Liga	8	0	1	0	—		—		9	0
Valencia	2017–18	La Liga	16	0	4	0	—		—		20	0
Valencia	2018–19	La Liga	4	0	4	0	5 (Note: One appearance in UEFA Champions League, Four appearances and one goal in UEFA Europa League)	1	—		13	1
Valencia	2020–21	La Liga	14	1	3	0	—		—		17	1
Valencia	2021–22	La Liga	11	0	5	0	—		—		16	0
Valencia	2022–23	La Liga	24	1	2	0	—		1 (Note: Appearance in Supercopa de España)	0	27	1
Valencia	Total		77	2	19	0	6	1	1	0	103	3
PSV (loan)	2019–20	Eredivisie	0	0	0	0	1	0	—		1	0
Jong PSV (loan)	2019–20	Eerste Divisie	2	0	—		—		—		2	0
Osasuna (loan)	2019–20	La Liga	8	1	0	0	—		—		8	1
Mallorca	2023–24	La Liga	28	0	6	0	—		—		34	0
Mallorca	2024–25	La Liga	14	0	1	0	—		0	0	15	0
Mallorca	2025–26	La Liga	12	0	2	0	—		—		14	0
Mallorca	2026–27	Segunda División	8	0	0	0	—		—		8	0
Mallorca	Total		62	0	9	0	—		—		71	0
Career total			183	3	28	0	7	1	7	0	225	4

== Honours ==
Valencia

- Copa del Rey: 2018–19
