= Jaume Doménech =

Spanish footballer (born 1990)

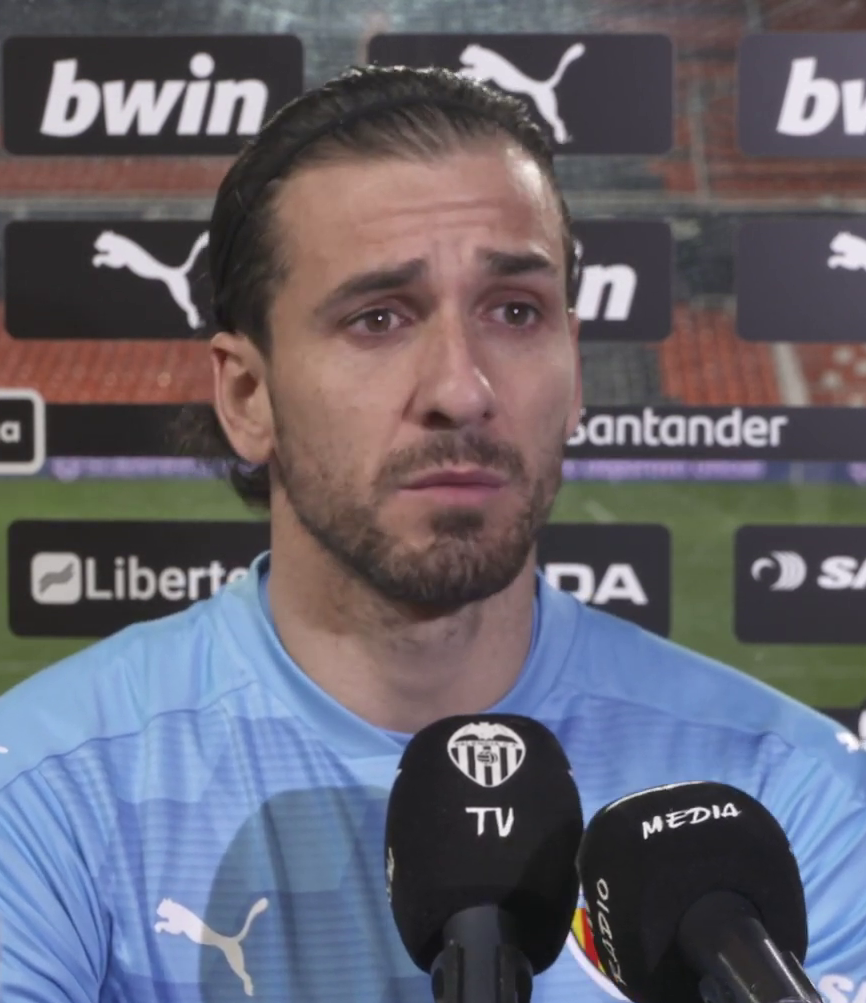
- Doménech with Valencia in 2021

Personal information
- Full name: Jaume Doménech Sánchez
- Date of birth: 5 November 1990 (age 36)
- Place of birth: Almenara, Spain
- Height: 1.85 m (6 ft 1 in)
- Position: Goalkeeper

Youth career
- 2007–2008: Almenara
- 2008–2009: Villarreal

Senior career*
Years	Team	Apps	(Gls)
2009–2012	Villarreal C	15	(0)
2009–2010	→ Onda (loan)	33	(0)
2012–2013	El Palo	12	(0)
2013	Huracán	2	(0)
2013–2015	Valencia B	53	(0)
2015–2025	Valencia	78	(0)
Total		193	(0)
- * Club domestic league appearances and goals

Jaume Doménech Sánchez (Valencian pronunciation: [ˈdʒawme ðoˈmenek]; (Note: In isolation, Doménech is pronounced [doˈmenek].) born 5 November 1990) is a Spanish former professional footballer who plays as a goalkeeper.

He made 122 competitive appearances for Valencia in a decade, being mainly been used as back-up. He won the 2018–19 Copa del Rey with the club.

== Club career ==
Born in Almenara, Castellón, Valencian Community, Doménech played youth football with Villarreal CF. He represented their C team after being loaned to CD Onda for one year.

In the summer of 2013, after brief spells with CD El Palo and Huracán Valencia CF, Doménech signed for Valencia CF, and was assigned to the reserves in the Segunda División B. In both of his seasons, the side narrowly avoided relegation with him as first choice.

Doménech was promoted to the main squad for the 2015–16 campaign by manager Nuno Espírito Santo. On 12 September, profiting from injuries to both Diego Alves and Mathew Ryan, he played his first match in La Liga, a 1–0 away win against Sporting de Gijón where he put in a player of the match performance. The following day, the club announced he had renewed his contract until 2018.

Doménech was backup to another Brazilian, Neto, in 2017–18. He started in the team's semi-final run in the Copa del Rey, notably saving two penalties in the shootout against Deportivo Alavés in the quarter-finals. In the following edition of the tournament he appeared in every game for the winners, including the 2–1 victory over FC Barcelona in the final. On 18 May 2019, he made a rare league appearance on the last day of the season away to Real Valladolid, keeping a clean sheet in a 2–0 win to qualify for the UEFA Champions League.

Doménech signed new contracts in September 2016 and November 2019, tying him to Valencia until 2023 and enacting a buyout clause of €50 million. In the summer of 2020, the club wanted to offload his competitor Jasper Cillessen due to financial problems but this never transpired; nonetheless, in the ensuing season he played the majority of league games for the first time due to the Dutchman's injuries.

Third-choice to new signing Giorgi Mamardashvili and Cillessen during the 2021–22 campaign, Doménech became a backup after the latter left, but suffered a serious knee injury on 8 September 2022. The following day, he further extended his contract until 2025.

Doménech left the Mestalla Stadium in June 2025. On 8 September, the 34-year-old announced his retirement.

== Career statistics ==
Appearances and goals by club, season and competition
Club	Season	League			Cup		Europe		Other		Total	
Club	Season	Division	Apps	Goals	Apps	Goals	Apps	Goals	Apps	Goals	Apps	Goals
Villarreal C	2010–11	Tercera División	0	0	—		—		—		0	0
Villarreal C	2011–12	Tercera División	15	0	—		—		—		15	0
Villarreal C	Total		15	0	—		—		—		15	0
Onda (loan)	2009–10	Tercera División	33	0	—		—		—		33	0
El Palo	2012–13	Tercera División	12	0	—		—		—		12	0
Huracán	2012–13	Segunda División B	2	0	—		—		0	0	2	0
Valencia B	2013–14	Segunda División B	27	0	—		—		2 (Note: Appearances in Segunda División B relegation play-offs)	0	29	0
Valencia B	2014–15	Segunda División B	26	0	—		—		—		26	0
Valencia B	Total		53	0	—		—		2	0	55	0
Valencia	2013–14	La Liga	0	0	0	0	0	0	—		0	0
Valencia	2014–15	La Liga	0	0	0	0	—		—		0	0
Valencia	2015–16	La Liga	17	0	1	0	6 (Note: Appearances in UEFA Champions League)	0	—		24	0
Valencia	2016–17	La Liga	3	0	4	0	—		—		7	0
Valencia	2017–18	La Liga	5	0	8	0	—		—		13	0
Valencia	2018–19	La Liga	4	0	9	0	1	0	—		14	0
Valencia	2019–20	La Liga	15	0	3	0	2	0	1 (Note: Appearance in Supercopa de España)	0	21	0
Valencia	2020–21	La Liga	28	0	0	0	—		—		28	0
Valencia	2021–22	La Liga	4	0	5	0	—		—		9	0
Valencia	2022–23	La Liga	0	0	0	0	—		—		0	0
Valencia	2023–24	La Liga	2	0	4	0	—		—		6	0
Valencia	2024–25	La Liga	0	0	0	0	—		—		0	0
Valencia	Total		78	0	34	0	9	0	1	0	122	0
Career total			193	0	34	0	9	0	3	0	239	0

== Honours ==
Valencia

- Copa del Rey: 2018–19
