= 2017–18 Valencia CF season =

98th season in existence of Valencia CF

Valencia
2017–18 season
- Owner: Peter Lim
- President: Anil Murthy
- Head coach: Marcelino
- Stadium: Mestalla
- La Liga: 4th
- Copa del Rey: Semi-final
- Top goalscorer: League: Rodrigo (16); All: Rodrigo (19)
- Highest home attendance: 47,775 vs Barcelona (26 November 2017)
- Lowest home attendance: 35,971 vs Las Palmas (18 August 2017)
Home colours	Away colours	Third colours

The 2017–18 season was Valencia Club de Fútbol's 98th in the club's history and their 83rd in La Liga. This article shows player statistics and all matches (official and friendly) that the club played during the 2017–18 season.

== Squad ==
As of 26 August 2017

Note: Flags indicate national team as defined under FIFA eligibility rules; some limited exceptions apply. Players may hold more than one non-FIFA nationality.

No.	Pos.	Nation	Player
1	GK	ESP	Jaume Domènech
3	DF	POR	Rúben Vezo
4	DF	COL	Jeison Murillo (on loan from Internazionale)
5	DF	BRA	Gabriel
6	MF	SRB	Nemanja Maksimović
7	MF	POR	Gonçalo Guedes (on loan from PSG)
8	FW	ARG	Luciano Vietto (on loan from Atlético de Madrid)
9	FW	ITA	Simone Zaza
10	MF	ESP	Dani Parejo (Captain)
11	MF	BRA	Andreas Pereira (on loan from Manchester United)
13	GK	BRA	Neto
14	DF	ESP	José Luis Gayà

No.	Pos.	Nation	Player
16	MF	FRA	Geoffrey Kondogbia (on loan from Internazionale)
17	MF	FRA	Francis Coquelin
18	MF	ESP	Carlos Soler
19	FW	ESP	Rodrigo
21	DF	ESP	Martín Montoya
22	FW	ESP	Santi Mina
24	DF	ARG	Ezequiel Garay
26	DF	ESP	Toni Lato
29	DF	ESP	Javi Jiménez
30	DF	ESP	Nacho Vidal
33	MF	ESP	Ferran Torres

=== Out on loan ===
Note: Flags indicate national team as defined under FIFA eligibility rules; some limited exceptions apply. Players may hold more than one non-FIFA nationality.

No.	Pos.	Nation	Player
—	DF	BRA	Aderlan Santos (at São Paulo until 31 December 2018)
—	DF	POR	João Cancelo (at Internazionale until 30 June 2018)
—	MF	BEL	Zakaria Bakkali (at Deportivo La Coruña until 30 June 2018)
—	MF	ESP	Eugeni (at Lorca until 30 June 2018)
—	MF	ESP	Sito (at Lorca until 30 June 2018)

No.	Pos.	Nation	Player
—	MF	ESP	Tropi (at Lorca until 30 June 2018)
—	DF	TUN	Aymen Abdennour (at Marseille until 30 June 2018)
--	FW	POR	Nani (at Lazio until 30 June 2018)
--	MF	ESP	Álvaro Medrán (at Alavés until 30 June 2018)
--	MF	CHI	Fabián Orellana (at Eibar until 30 June 2018)
--	MF	ESP	Nacho Gil (at Las Palmas until 30 June 2018)

== Transfers ==
=== In ===
No.	Pos.	Nat.	Name	Age	EU	Moving from	Type	Transfer window	Ends	Transfer fee	Source
13	GK	(Brazil)	Neto	27	Non-EU	(Italy) Juventus	Transfer	Summer	2021	€7,000,000	
6	MF	(Serbia)	Nemanja Maksimović	22	Non-EU	(Kazakhstan) Astana	Transfer	Summer	2022	Free	
	FW	(Spain)	Álvaro Negredo	31	EU	(England) Middlesbrough	Loan return	Summer	2018	Free	
3	DF	(Portugal)	Rúben Vezo	32	EU	(Spain) Granada	Loan return	Summer		Free	
9	FW	(Italy)	Simone Zaza	26	EU	(Italy) Juventus	Transfer	Summer		€16,000,000	
15	MF	(Chile)	Fabián Orellana	31	Non-EU	(Spain) Celta Vigo	Transfer	Summer		€3,000,000	ESPN
5	DF	(Brazil)	Gabriel	26	Non-EU	(England) Arsenal	Transfer	Summer	2022	€11,000,000	
4	DF	(Colombia)	Jeison Murillo	25	Non-EU	(Italy) Internazionale	Loan	Summer	2019	Free	
16	MF	(France)	Geoffrey Kondogbia	24	EU	(Italy) Internazionale	Loan	Summer	2018	Free	
11	MF	(Brazil)	Andreas Pereira	21	EU	(England) Manchester United	Loan	Summer	2018	Free	
7	MF	(Portugal)	Gonçalo Guedes	20	EU	(France) Paris Saint-Germain	Loan	Summer	2018	Free	
8	FW	(Argentina)	Luciano Vietto	24	EU	(Spain) Atlético Madrid	Loan	Winter	2018	Undisclosed	
17	MF	(France)	Francis Coquelin	26	EU	(England) Arsenal	Transfer	Winter	2018	Undisclosed	

Total spend: €37,000,000

=== Out ===
No.	Pos.	Nat.	Name	Age	EU	Moving to	Type	Transfer window	Transfer fee	Source
7	MF	(Spain)	Mario Suárez	39	EU	(China) Guizhou Hengfeng Zhicheng	Loan return to Watford	Summer	N/A	
9	FW	(Spain)	Munir	31	EU	(Spain) Barcelona	Loan return	Summer	N/A	
6	DF	(Brazil)	Guilherme Siqueira	40	EU	(Spain) Atlético Madrid	Loan return	Summer	N/A	
5	DF	(France)	Eliaquim Mangala	35	EU	(England) Manchester City	Loan return	Summer	N/A	
25	GK	(Australia)	Mathew Ryan	25	Non-EU	(England) Brighton & Hove Albion	Transfer	Summer	€6,000,000	
8	MF	(Argentina)	Enzo Pérez	31	Non-EU	(Argentina) River Plate	Transfer	Summer	€2,500,000	
11	MF	(Belgium)	Zakaria Bakkali	21	EU	(Spain) Deportivo La Coruña	Loan	Summer	N/A	
4	DF	(Brazil)	Aderlan Santos	28	Non-EU	(Brazil) São Paulo	Loan	Summer	€800,000	
	GK	(Spain)	Yoel	28	EU	(Spain) Eibar	Transfer	Summer	€750,000	
11	MF	(Argentina)	Pablo Piatti	27	Non-EU	(Spain) Espanyol	Transfer	Summer	€1,250,000	
1	GK	(Brazil)	Diego Alves	32	EU	(Brazil) Flamengo	Transfer	Summer	€500,000	
	CF	(Spain)	Álvaro Negredo	31	EU	(Turkey) Beşiktaş	Transfer	Summer	€2,000,000	
7	MF	(Portugal)	João Cancelo	23	EU	(Italy) Internazionale	Loan	Summer	N/A	
23	DF	(Tunisia)	Aymen Abdennour	28	Non-EU	(France) Marseille	Loan	Summer	N/A	
17	MF	(Portugal)	Nani	30	EU	(Italy) Lazio	Loan	Summer	N/A	
	CF	(Brazil)	Vinícius Araújo	24	EU	(Spain) Real Zaragoza	Contract terminated	Summer	N/A	
8	MF	(Spain)	Álvaro Medrán	23	EU	(Spain) Alavés	Loan	Summer	N/A	
	FW	(Spain)	Rafa Mir	20	EU	(England) Wolverhampton Wanderers	Transfer	Summer	€3,000,000	
15	MF	(Chile)	Fabián Orellana	31	Non-EU	(Spain) Eibar	Loan	Summer	€400,000	
20	MF	(Spain)	Robert	24	EU	(Spain) Getafe	Transfer	Summer	N/A	

Net income: €17,200,000

== Statistics ==
=== Appearances and goals ===
Last updated on 20 May 2018

No.	Pos	Nat	Player	Total		La Liga		Copa del Rey	
No.	Pos	Nat	Player	Apps	Goals	Apps	Goals	Apps	Goals
Goalkeepers
1	GK	(Spain) ESP	Jaume Domènech	13	0	5	0	8	0
13	GK	(Brazil) BRA	Neto	33	0	33	0	0	0
Defenders
3	DF	(Portugal) POR	Rúben Vezo	26	1	17+2	0	6+1	1
4	DF	(Colombia) COL	Jeison Murillo	17	0	15+2	0	0	0
5	DF	(Brazil) BRA	Gabriel	37	0	29+1	0	7	0
14	DF	(Spain) ESP	José Luis Gayà	38	0	33+1	0	4	0
21	DF	(Spain) ESP	Martín Montoya	31	0	24+1	0	6	0
24	DF	(Argentina) ARG	Ezequiel Garay	28	0	23+1	0	3+1	0
26	DF	(Spain) ESP	Toni Lato	20	0	9+7	0	4	0
29	DF	(Spain) ESP	Javi Jiménez	0	0	0	0	0	0
30	DF	(Spain) ESP	Nacho Vidal	9	1	5+2	1	2	0
Midfielders
6	MF	(Serbia) SRB	Nemanja Maksimović	21	1	6+9	0	5+1	1
7	MF	(Portugal) POR	Gonçalo Guedes	38	6	27+6	5	2+3	1
10	MF	(Spain) ESP	Dani Parejo	42	8	34	7	6+2	1
11	MF	(Brazil) BRA	Andreas Pereira	29	1	12+11	1	6	0
16	MF	(France) FRA	Geoffrey Kondogbia	36	4	30+1	4	5	0
17	MF	(France) FRA	Francis Coquelin	11	1	7+2	1	2	0
18	MF	(Spain) ESP	Carlos Soler	37	1	27+6	1	1+3	0
Forwards
8	FW	(Argentina) ARG	Luciano Vietto	19	5	5+9	2	5	3
9	FW	(Italy) ITA	Simone Zaza	39	13	23+10	13	6	0
19	FW	(Spain) ESP	Rodrigo	44	19	31+6	16	2+5	3
22	FW	(Spain) ESP	Santi Mina	38	15	17+15	12	3+3	3
33	FW	(Spain) ESP	Ferran Torres	16	0	2+11	0	0+3	0
Players who have made an appearance or had a squad number this season but have been loaned out or transferred
7	MF	(Portugal) POR	João Cancelo	1	0	1	0	0	0
8	MF	(Spain) ESP	Álvaro Medrán	1	0	1	0	0	0
12	FW	(Brazil) BRA	Vinícius Araújo	0	0	0	0	0	0
15	MF	(Chile) CHI	Fabián Orellana	1	0	0	0	1	0
17	FW	(Portugal) POR	Nani	0	0	0	0	0	0
20	MF	(Spain) ESP	Robert	1	1	0	0	0+1	1
31	MF	(Spain) ESP	Nacho Gil	8	0	2+4	0	2	0

=== Cards ===
Accounts for all competitions. Last updated on 19 December 2017.

No.	Pos.	Name	Yellow card	Red card
1	GK	(Spain) Jaume	1	0
4	DF	(Colombia) Jeison Murillo	2	0
5	DF	(Brazil) Gabriel	2	0
7	MF	(Portugal) Gonçalo Guedes	1	0
9	FW	(Italy) Simone Zaza	5	0
10	MF	(Spain) Dani Parejo	8	0
11	MF	(Brazil) Andreas Pereira	5	0
14	DF	(Spain) Gayà	4	0
16	MF	(France) Kondogbia	3	1
18	MF	(Spain) Carlos Soler	1	0
19	FW	(Spain) Rodrigo	3	0
21	DF	(Spain) Martín Montoya	4	0
22	FW	(Spain) Santi Mina	2	0
24	DF	(Argentina) Ezequiel Garay	1	0
26	DF	(Spain) Toni Lato	2	0
30	DF	(Spain) Nacho Vidal	1	0

=== Clean sheets ===
Last updated on 19 December 2017

Number	Nation	Name	Matches Played	La Liga	Copa del Rey	Total
1	(Spain)	Jaume	3	0	1	1
13	(Brazil)	Neto	15	6	0	6
TOTALS				6	1	7

== Competitions ==
Win Draw Loss

=== Overview ===
Competition	First match	Last match	Starting round	Final position	Record							
Competition	First match	Last match	Starting round	Final position	Pld	W	D	L	GF	GA	GD	Win %
La Liga	20 August 2017	20 May 2018	Matchday 1	4th	38	22	7	9	65	38	+27	57.89
Copa del Rey	24 October 2017	8 February 2018	Round of 32	Semi-finals	8	4	1	3	14	8	+6	50.00
Total					46	26	8	12	79	46	+33	56.52

Last updated: 20 May 2018
Source: Competitions

=== Standings ===
Pos	Team	Pld	W	D	L	GF	GA	GD	Pts	Qualification or relegation
2	Atlético Madrid	38	23	10	5	58	22	+36	79	Qualification for the Champions League group stage
3	Real Madrid	38	22	10	6	94	44	+50	76	Qualification for the Champions League group stage
4	Valencia	38	22	7	9	65	38	+27	73	Qualification for the Champions League group stage
5	Villarreal	38	18	7	13	57	50	+7	61	Qualification for the Europa League group stage (Note: Since the winners of the 2017–18 Copa del Rey, Barcelona, qualified for European competition based on league position, the spot awarded to the cup winners (Europa League group stage) was passed to the sixth-placed team and the spot awarded to the sixth-placed team (Europa League second qualifying round) was passed to the seventh-placed team.)
6	Real Betis	38	18	6	14	60	61	−1	60	Qualification for the Europa League group stage

Source: La Liga, Soccerway
Rules for classification: 1) Points; 2) Head-to-head points; 3) Head-to-head goal difference; 4) Goal difference; 5) Goals scored; 6) Fair-play points (Note: Head-to-head record is used only after all the matches between the teams in question have been played)

==== Results summary ====
Overall								Home						Away					
Pld	W	D	L	GF	GA	GD	Pts	W	D	L	GF	GA	GD	W	D	L	GF	GA	GD
38	22	7	9	65	38	+27	73	13	3	3	36	16	+20	9	4	6	29	22	+7

Last updated: 20 May 2018.
Source: LaLiga

==== Result round by round ====
Round	1	2	3	4	5	6	7	8	9	10	11	12	13	14	15	16	17	18	19	20	21	22	23	24	25	26	27	28	29	30	31	32	33	34	35	36	37	38
Ground	H	A	H	A	H	A	H	A	H	A	H	A	H	A	H	A	H	H	A	A	H	A	H	A	H	A	H	A	H	A	H	A	H	A	H	A	A	H
Result	W	D	D	D	W	W	W	W	W	W	W	W	D	L	W	L	L	W	W	L	L	L	W	W	W	D	W	W	W	W	W	L	L	D	D	L	W	W
Position	5	8	9	11	4	4	3	2	2	2	2	2	2	2	2	4	3	3	3	3	3	4	4	4	4	3	4	4	4	4	3	3	4	4	4	4	4	4

Updated to match(es) played on 15 September 2018. Source:
A = Away; H = Home; W = Win; D = Draw; L = Loss

==== Matchday ====
Win Draw Loss Fixtures

18 August 2017 1	Valencia	1–0	Las Palmas	Valencia
22:15 CEST (UTC+02:00)	Zaza (yellow card) 9', (goal) 22'; Parejo (yellow card) 40'; Gayà (yellow card) 71'	Report	Halilović (red card) 33'; Navarro (yellow card) 47'; Bigas (yellow card) 67'; David Simón (yellow card) 80'	Stadium: Mestalla; Attendance: 36,019; Referee: Jesús Gil Manzano

27 August 2017 2	Real Madrid	2–2	Valencia	Madrid
22:15 CEST (UTC+02:00)	Asensio 10', 83'; Nacho (yellow card) 53'; Casemiro (yellow card) 72'	Report	Soler 18', (yellow card) 84'; Montoya (yellow card) 49'; Parejo (yellow card) 66'; Kondogbia 77'; Rodrigo (yellow card) 81'; Zaza (yellow card) 90+2'	Stadium: Santiago Bernabéu; Attendance: 61,739; Referee: David Fernández Borbalán

9 September 2017 3	Valencia	0–0	Atlético Madrid	Valencia
16:15 CEST (UTC+02:00)	Montoya (yellow card) 35'	Report		Stadium: Mestalla; Attendance: 43,859; Referee: José González González

16 September 2017 4	Levante	1–1	Valencia	Valencia
13:00 CEST (UTC+02:00)	Postigo (yellow card) 3'; Bardhi (yellow card) 37', (goal) 41'	Report	Parejo (yellow card) 15'; Rodrigo 31'	Stadium: Ciutat de València; Attendance: 21,770; Referee: Carlos del Cerro Grande

19 September 2017 5	Valencia	5–0	Málaga	Valencia
20:00 CEST (UTC+02:00)	Mina 17'; Zaza 55', 60', 63'; Rodrigo 86'	Report	Ricca (yellow card) 83'	Stadium: Mestalla; Attendance: 36,215; Referee: Alfonso Álvarez Izquierdo

24 September 2017 6	Real Sociedad	2–3	Valencia	San Sebastián
20:45 CEST (UTC+02:00)	Elustondo 33'; Oyarzabal 59', (yellow card) 77'; Zubeldia (yellow card) 59' (yellow-red card) 68'	Report	Rodrigo 26', (yellow card) 27'; Vidal 55'; Zaza 85'; Guedes (yellow card) 9'; Kondogbia (yellow card) 45' (yellow-red card) 79'; Gayà (yellow card) 56'; Mina (yellow card) 90+2'; Domènech (yellow card) 90+4'	Stadium: Anoeta; Attendance: 20,266; Referee: Santiago Jaime Latre

1 October 2017 7	Valencia	3–2	Athletic Bilbao	Valencia
18:30 CEST (UTC+02:00)	Gayà (yellow card) 18'; Zaza 27', (yellow card) 84'; Parejo 34' (pen.), (yellow card) 84'; Rodrigo 66'	Report	Kepa (yellow card) 33'; Núñez (yellow card) 50'; Aduriz 59'; García (yellow card) 63', (goal) 76'; Vesga (yellow card) 80'	Stadium: Mestalla; Attendance: 42,070; Referee: Alejandro Hernández Hernández

15 October 2017 8	Real Betis	3–6	Valencia	Seville
20:45 CEST (UTC+02:00)	Feddal (yellow card) 45'; Campbell 79'; Sanabria 80'; Tello 84'	Report	Kondogbia 35'; Guedes 45'; Garay (yellow card) 46'; Vidal (yellow card) 52'; Murillo (yellow card) 59'; Rodrigo 64'; Mina 74'; Pereira (yellow card) 87', (goal) 90+3'; Zaza 88'	Stadium: Benito Villamarín; Attendance: 48,792; Referee: José María Sánchez Martínez

22 October 2017 9	Valencia	4–0	Sevilla	Valencia
18:30 CEST (UTC+02:00)	Guedes 43', 90+2'; Zaza 51', (yellow card) 60'; Mina 85'; Parejo (yellow card) 88'	Report	Nolito (yellow card) 9'; Lenglet (yellow card) 14'; Pizarro (yellow card) 27'; Corchia (yellow card) 37'	Stadium: Mestalla; Attendance: 44,375; Referee: Xavier Estrada Fernández

28 October 2017 10	Alavés	1–2	Valencia	Vitoria-Gasteiz
13:00 CEST (UTC+02:00)	Vigaray (yellow card) 23'; Santos (yellow card) 35'; Alexis 49'; Ely (yellow card) 65'; Diéguez (yellow card) 76'; M. García (yellow card) 86'	Report	Gabriel (yellow card) 17'; Zaza 36'; Rodrigo 66' (pen.)	Stadium: Mendizorrotza; Attendance: 18,638; Referee: José González González

5 November 2017 11	Valencia	3–0	Leganés	Valencia
13:00 CET (UTC+01:00)	Parejo 14', (yellow card) 90+1'; Rodrigo 71'; Mina 82' (pen.)	Report	Beauvue (yellow card) 84'	Stadium: Mestalla; Attendance: 39,694; Referee: Ricardo de Burgos Bengoetxea

19 November 2017 12	Espanyol	0–2	Valencia	Cornellà de Llobregat
16:15 CET (UTC+01:00)		Report	Murillo (yellow card) 29'; Lato (yellow card) 49'; Montoya (yellow card) 49'; Kondogbia 67'; Pereira (yellow card) 78'; Mina 83'	Stadium: RCDE Stadium; Attendance: 25,529; Referee: Alejandro Hernández Hernández

26 November 2017 13	Valencia	1–1	Barcelona	Valencia
20:45 CET (UTC+01:00)	Kondogbia (yellow card) 32'; Gabriel (yellow card) 44'; Rodrigo 60', (yellow card) 74'; Pereira (yellow card) 89'	Report	Alba 82'	Stadium: Mestalla; Attendance: 47,775; Referee: Ignacio Iglesias Villanueva

3 December 2017 14	Getafe	1–0	Valencia	Getafe
16:15 CET (UTC+01:00)	Molinero (yellow card) 13'; Arambarri (yellow card) 21' (yellow-red card) 25'; Djené (yellow card) 52'; Bergara 66'; Amath (yellow card) 71'; Ángel (yellow card) 73'; Molina (yellow card) 88'; Suárez (yellow card) 90'	Report	Kondogbia (yellow card) 23'; Parejo (yellow card) 69'; Montoya (yellow card) 83'; Mina (yellow card) 90'	Stadium: Coliseum Alfonso Pérez; Attendance: 12,480; Referee: David Medié Jiménez

9 December 2017 15	Valencia	2–1	Celta Vigo	Valencia
20:45 CET (UTC+01:00)	Zaza 28', (yellow card) 58'; Gayà (yellow card) 60'; Parejo 81' (pen.)	Report	Aspas 46', (yellow card) 85'; M. Gómez (yellow card) 70'; Mallo (yellow card) 81'; Fontàs (yellow card) 86'; Hernández (yellow card) 90+4'	Stadium: Mestalla; Attendance: 35,633; Referee: José Luis Munuera Montero

16 December 2017 16	Eibar	2–1	Valencia	Eibar
18:30 CET (UTC+01:00)	Inui 49'; García (yellow card) 65'; Jordán 87'	Report	Mina 57'; Kondogbia (yellow card) 71'; Parejo (yellow card) 76'; Pereira (yellow card) 80'; Lato (yellow card) 82'	Stadium: Ipurua; Attendance: 5,219; Referee: Pablo González Fuertes

23 December 2017 17	Valencia	0–1	Villarreal	Valencia
16:15 CET (UTC+01:00)	Kondogbia (yellow card) 15'; Parejo (yellow card) 45'; Zaza (yellow card) 58' (yellow-red card) 60'; Gabriel (yellow card) 81'; Neto (yellow card) 82'; Montoya (yellow card) 90+2'	Report	Bacca 24'; Fornals (yellow card) 27'; Álvaro (yellow card) 39'; Trigueros (yellow card) 54' (yellow-red card) 83'; Rukavina (yellow card) 62'	Stadium: Mestalla; Attendance: 39,181; Referee: Daniel Trujillo Suárez

6 January 2018 18	Valencia	2–1	Girona	Valencia
16:15 CET (UTC+01:00)	Pereira (yellow card) 24'; Ramalho 27' (o.g.); Garay (yellow card) 35'; Parejo 48' (pen.); Kondogbia (yellow card) 76'; Maksimović (yellow card) 85'; Gabriel (yellow card) 86'	Report	Portu 8', (yellow card) 27'; Mojica (yellow card) 16'; Bernardo (yellow card) 55'; Stuani (yellow card) 76'; Timor (yellow card) 84'	Stadium: Mestalla; Attendance: 27,749; Referee: David Fernández Borbalán

14 January 2018 19	Deportivo La Coruña	1–2	Valencia	A Coruña
20:45 CET (UTC+01:00)	Mosquera (yellow card) 47'; Andone 88'	Report	Guedes 37'; Parejo (yellow card) 63'; Rodrigo 64'; Gayà (yellow card) 90+3'	Stadium: Riazor; Attendance: 19,031; Referee: Javier Alberola Rojas

21 January 2018 20	Las Palmas	2–1	Valencia	Las Palmas
20:45 CET (UTC+01:00)	Viera 20'; Calleri 53' (pen.); Samperio (yellow card) 73'; Halilović (yellow card) 76'	Report	Mina 5'; Lato (yellow card) 21'; Vezo (yellow card) 26' (yellow-red card); Paulista (yellow card) 52' (yellow-red card); Montoya (yellow card) 62'; Zaza (yellow card) 70'; Neto (yellow card) 72'	Stadium: Gran Canaria; Attendance: 20,242; Referee: José Luis Munuera Montero

27 January 2018 21	Valencia	1–4	Real Madrid	Valencia
16:15 CET (UTC+01:00)	Mina 58'; Gayà (yellow card) 60'; Parejo (yellow card) 87'	Report	Ronaldo 16' (pen.), 38' (pen.); Bale (yellow card) 52'; Varane (yellow card) 63'; Carvajal (yellow card) 71'; Marcelo 84'; Kroos 89'	Stadium: Mestalla; Attendance: 47,034; Referee: Xavier Estrada Fernández

4 February 2018 22	Atlético Madrid	1–0	Valencia	Madrid
20:45 CET (UTC+01:00)	Correa 59'; Gabi (yellow card) 74'	Report	Gayà (yellow card) 90+3'	Stadium: Wanda Metropolitano; Attendance: 49,596; Referee: Ignacio Iglesias Villanueva

11 February 2018 23	Valencia	3–1	Levante	Valencia
20:45 CET (UTC+01:00)	Mina 17', (yellow card) 57'; Vietto (yellow card) 48', (goal) 65'; Gayà (yellow card) 72'; Parejo 89' (pen.)	Report	Róber (yellow card) 13'; Postigo 18', (yellow card) 84'; Bardhi (yellow card) 84'; Luna (yellow card) 88'	Stadium: Mestalla; Attendance: 38,199; Referee: David Medié Jiménez

17 February 2018 24	Málaga	1–2	Valencia	Málaga
20:45 CET (UTC+01:00)	Ideye 27'; Iturra (yellow card) 62'; Castro (yellow card) 75'; Miquel (red card) 84'	Report	Murillo (yellow card) 33'; Coquelin (yellow card) 70', (goal) 80'; Parejo (yellow card) 75', (goal) 85' (pen.); Soler (yellow card) 77'	Stadium: La Rosaleda; Attendance: 21,134; Referee: Daniel Trujillo Suárez

25 February 2018 25	Valencia	2–1	Real Sociedad	Valencia
18:30 CET (UTC+01:00)	Mina 34', 68', (yellow card) 90+3'; Rodrigo (yellow card) 78'	Report	Juanmi (yellow card) 22'; De la Bella (yellow card) 29'; Canales (yellow card) 31'; Oyarzabal 54'	Stadium: Mestalla; Attendance: 37,195; Referee: Pablo González Fuertes

28 February 2018 26	Athletic Bilbao	1–1	Valencia	Bilbao
19:30 CET (UTC+01:00)	Córdoba (yellow card) 29'; De Marcos 49'	Report	Zaza (yellow card) 20'; Kondogbia 23'; Murillo (yellow card) 69'	Stadium: San Mamés; Attendance: 34,382; Referee: Jesús Gil Manzano

4 March 2018 27	Valencia	2–0	Real Betis	Valencia
20:45 CET (UTC+01:00)	Rodrigo 23'; Montoya (yellow card) 45'; Zaza 47'	Report	Barragán (yellow card) 44'; Joaquín (yellow card) 79'; Fabián (yellow card) 79'; Bartra (yellow card) 82'	Stadium: Mestalla; Attendance: 35,565; Referee: Alejandro Hernández Hernández

11 March 2018 28	Sevilla	0–2	Valencia	Seville
16:15 CET (UTC+01:00)	Escudero (yellow card) 35'; Muriel (yellow card) 40'; Mercado (yellow card) 40'; Correa (yellow card) 82'	Report	Rodrigo 25', 68'; Kondogbia (yellow card) 60'; Garay (yellow card) 87'	Stadium: Ramón Sánchez Pizjuán; Attendance: 33,287; Referee: Ricardo de Burgos Bengoetxea

18 March 2018 29	Valencia	3–1	Alavés	Valencia
16:15 CET (UTC+01:00)	Rodrigo 19'; Zaza 33'; Kondogbia (yellow card) 45'; Laguardia 54' (o.g.)	Report	Sobrino 49'; Pina (yellow card) 56'	Stadium: Mestalla; Attendance: 35,264; Referee: José Luis Munuera Montero

1 April 2018 30	Leganés	0–1	Valencia	Leganés
16:15 CEST (UTC+02:00)	Pérez (yellow card) 31'; Rico (yellow card) 57'; Beauvue (yellow card) 88'	Report	Kondogbia (yellow card) 33'; Rodrigo 62'; Domènech (yellow card) 86'; Gayà (yellow card) 89'; Parejo (yellow card) 90+4'	Stadium: Butarque; Attendance: 10,697; Referee: Mario Melero López

8 April 2018 31	Valencia	1–0	Espanyol	Valencia
20:45 CEST (UTC+02:00)	Rodrigo 7'; Soler (yellow card) 53'; Garay (yellow card) 54'; Kondogbia (yellow card) 90+2'	Report	Sánchez (yellow card) 15'; Baptistão (yellow card) 68'	Stadium: Mestalla; Attendance: 36,296; Referee: Jesús Gil Manzano

15 April 2018 32	Barcelona	2–1	Valencia	Barcelona
16:15 CEST (UTC+02:00)	Piqué (yellow card) 7'; L. Suárez 15'; Umtiti 51'; Dembélé (yellow card) 86'	Report	Kondogbia (yellow card) 12'; Gabriel (yellow card) 75'; Parejo 87' (pen.)	Stadium: Camp Nou; Attendance: 69,544; Referee: Carlos del Cerro Grande

18 April 2018 33	Valencia	1–2	Getafe	Valencia
19:30 CEST (UTC+02:00)	Rodrigo 69'; Gayà (yellow card) 78'; Parejo (red card) 86'	Report	Rémy 16', 49', (yellow card) 62'; Jiménez (yellow card) 70'; Djené (yellow card) 70'; Cabrera (yellow card) 74'; Molina (yellow card) 87'; Suárez (yellow card) 89'; Antunes (yellow card) 90+3'	Stadium: Mestalla; Attendance: 35,829; Referee: Ricardo de Burgos Bengoetxea

21 April 2018 34	Celta Vigo	1–1	Valencia	Vigo
16:15 CEST (UTC+02:00)	S. Gómez (yellow card) 43'; M. Gómez 63'	Report	Mina 59'; Vezo (yellow card) 62'; Garay (yellow card) 90'	Stadium: Balaídos; Attendance: 17,316; Referee: Alberto Undiano Mallenco

29 April 2018 35	Valencia	0–0	Eibar	Valencia
18:30 CEST (UTC+02:00)	Kondogbia (yellow card) 44'; Parejo (yellow card) 78'	Report	José Ángel (yellow card) 15'; Jordán (yellow card) 82'; Kike (yellow card) 90+1'	Stadium: Mestalla; Attendance: 40,328; Referee: Santiago Jaime Latre

5 May 2018 36	Villarreal	1–0	Valencia	Villarreal
20:45 CEST (UTC+02:00)	Rukavina (yellow card) 11'; Cheryshev (yellow card) 29'; Rodri (yellow card) 34'; Ruiz (yellow card) 84'; Mario 86'; Asenjo (yellow card) 90+2'	Report	Guedes (yellow card) 21'; Gayà (yellow card) 43'; Parejo (yellow card) 60'	Stadium: La Cerámica; Attendance: 19,079; Referee: Jesús Gil Manzano

12 May 2018 37	Girona	0–1	Valencia	Girona
18:30 CEST (UTC+02:00)	Timor (yellow card) 90'	Report	Soler (yellow card) 29'; Zaza (yellow card) 60'; Vietto 61'; Lato (yellow card) 76'	Stadium: Montilivi; Attendance: 10,850; Referee: Ignacio Iglesias Villanueva

20 May 2018 38	Valencia	2–1	Deportivo La Coruña	Valencia
12:00 CEST (UTC+02:00)	Zaza 28'; Guedes 77'	Report	Pérez 80'	Stadium: Mestalla; Attendance: 35,376; Referee: David Medié Jiménez

=== Copa del Rey ===
==== Round of 32 ====
Win Draw Loss Fixtures

24 October 2017 First leg	Zaragoza	0–2	Valencia	Zaragoza
20:30 CEST	Delmás (yellow card) 90+1'	Report	Vezo (yellow card) 40'; Vidal (yellow card) 65'; Rodrigo 81'; Parejo 90+1'	Stadium: La Romareda; Attendance: 16,174; Referee: David Medié Jiménez

30 November 2017 Second leg	Valencia	4–1 (6–1 agg.)	Zaragoza	Valencia
21:30 CET	Mina 28', 59'; Pereira (yellow card) 62'; Ibáñez 68'; Vezo 86'	Report	Pombo 87'	Stadium: Mestalla; Attendance: 26,311; Referee: Mario Melero López

==== Round of 16 ====
3 January 2018 First leg	Las Palmas	1–1	Valencia	Las Palmas
21:00 CET	Calleri 36', (yellow card) 90+3'; Gálvez (yellow card) 62'; Navarro (yellow card) 78'	Report	Zaza (yellow card) 76'; Rodrigo 85'	Stadium: Gran Canaria; Attendance: 16,685; Referee: Alberto Undiano Mallenco

9 January 2018 Second leg	Valencia	4–0 (5–1 agg.)	Las Palmas	Valencia
21:30 CET	Vietto 30', 48', 66'; Maksimović 54'; Lato (yellow card) 81'	Report	García (yellow card) 90'	Stadium: Mestalla; Attendance: 27,869; Referee: Carlos del Cerro Grande

==== Quarter-finals ====
17 January 2018 First leg	Valencia	2–1	Alavés	Valencia
19:00 CET	Guedes (yellow card) 53', (goal) 73'; Rodrigo 82'; Mina (yellow card) 86'; Kondogbia (yellow card) 90+2'	Report	Pina (yellow card) 41'; Sobrino 66'; Diéguez (yellow card) 67' (yellow-red card) 77'	Stadium: Mestalla; Attendance: 31,338; Referee: José González González

24 January 2018 Second leg	Alavés	2–1 (a.e.t.) (3–3 agg.) (2–3 p)	Valencia	Vitoria-Gasteiz
19:00 CET	Torres (yellow card) 48'; Pedraza (yellow card) 66'; Munir 73', (yellow card) 80'; Sobrino 86'; Pina (yellow card) 96'; Duarte (yellow card) 97'	Report	Maksimović (yellow card) 50'; Vezo (yellow card) 61'; Mina 77', (yellow card) 103'; Kondogbia (yellow card) 79'; Parejo (yellow card) 85'; Guedes (yellow card) 93'	Stadium: Mendizorrotza; Attendance: 19,127; Referee: Alfonso Álvarez Izquierdo
	Penalties
	Pina (penalty scored); Pedraza (penalty missed); Pérez (penalty missed); Munir (penalty scored); Sobrino (penalty missed)		(penalty scored) Rodrigo; (penalty scored) Mina; (penalty missed) Kondogbia; (penalty scored) Gayà

==== Semi-finals ====
1 February 2018 First leg	Barcelona	1–0	Valencia	Barcelona
21:30 CET	Roberto (yellow card) 35'; L. Suárez 67'	Report	Pereira (yellow card) 40'; Vietto (yellow card) 51'; Soler (yellow card) 53'	Stadium: Camp Nou; Attendance: 50,959; Referee: José María Sánchez Martínez

8 February 2018 Second leg	Valencia	0–2 (0–3 agg.)	Barcelona	Valencia
21:30 CET	Rodrigo (yellow card) 34'; Zaza (yellow card) 75'; Parejo (yellow card) 90+1'	Report	Coutinho 49'; Rakitić 82'	Stadium: Mestalla; Attendance: 43,355; Referee: Alberto Undiano Mallenco
