= Alessandro Burlamaqui =

Peruvian footballer (born 2002)

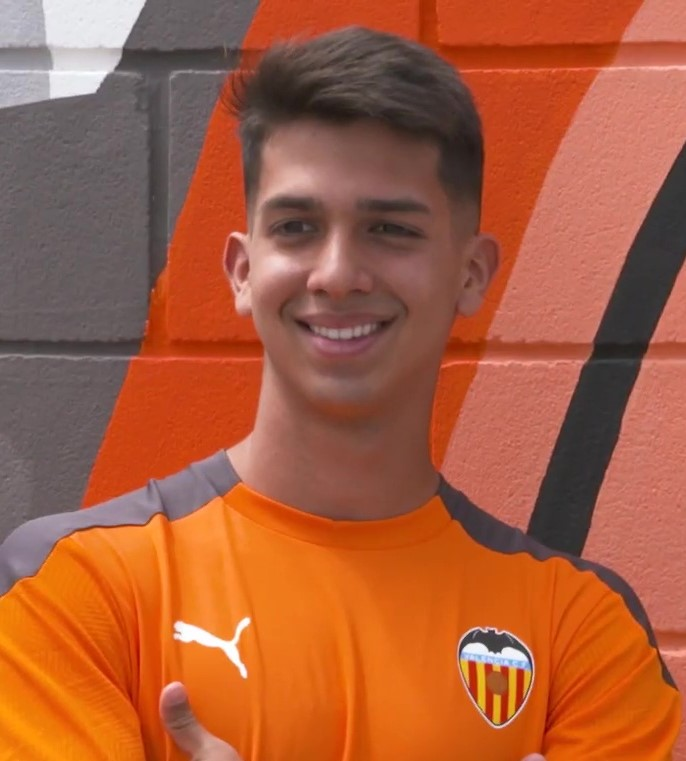

Personal information
- Full name: Alessandro Burlamaqui Apaolaza
- Date of birth: 18 February 2002 (age 24)
- Place of birth: Lima, Peru
- Height: 1.80 m (5 ft 11 in)
- Position: Midfielder

Team information
- Current team: Alianza Lima
- Number: 28

Youth career
- 2006–2011: Gimnàstic
- 2011–2014: Santes Creus
- 2014–2015: Reus Deportiu
- 2015–2021: Espanyol

Senior career*
| Years | Team | Apps | (Gls) |
| 2021–2023 | Valencia B | 22 | (0) |
| 2022–2023 | → Badajoz (loan) | 13 | (0) |
| 2023 | → Intercity (loan) | 14 | (0) |
| 2023–2025 | Intercity | 48 | (1) |
| 2025– | Alianza Lima | 8 | (0) |

International career^{‡}
| 2019 | Peru U17 | 9 | (0) |
| 2020 | Peru U20 | 3 | (0) |
| 2024 | Peru U23 | 4 | (0) |
- * Club domestic league appearances and goals as of 29 December 2025 ‡ National team caps and goals as of 22:30, 29 January 2024 (UTC)

Alessandro Burlamaqui Apaolaza (born 18 February 2002) is a Peruvian footballer who plays as a midfielder for Alianza Lima.

== Club career ==
=== Early career ===
Burlamaqui was born in Lima, Peru, to a Brazilian father and Peruvian mother, but moved to Spain as a one-year-old. After settling in Spain, Burlamaqui joined his first professional football team at the age of seven, when he signed for Gimnàstic de Tarragona. He also played for the youth sides of CE Santes Creus and CF Reus Deportiu, before joining RCD Espanyol in 2015.

Burlamaqui rose quickly through the youth ranks of Espanyol to become captain of both Juvenil A & B Teams side. In October 2019, he was named among the 60 best young talents in the world by English newspaper The Guardian.

=== Valencia ===
In July 2021, Burlamaqui signed for fellow Spanish side Valencia CF on a three-year deal. He played for the reserve team, helping in their promotion to Segunda División RFEF.

On 19 July 2022, Burlamaqui was loaned to Primera Federación side CD Badajoz for the season.

=== Intercity ===
On 30 January 2023, Burlamaqui moved to fellow third division team CF Intercity also on loan. On 24 August, he signed a permanent two-year deal with the club.

== International career ==
Burlamaqui is eligible to represent Peru, his birthplace, Brazil through his father, and Spain for his Spanish-Basque ancestry from his mother's family side. He has represented Peru at both under-17 and under-20 levels. He has committed his international future to Peru.

== Career statistics ==
=== Club ===
As of match played 25 August 2025

Appearances and goals by club, season and competition
| Club | Season | League | | | Cup | | Continental | | Other | | Total | |
| Club | Season | Division | Apps | Goals | Apps | Goals | Apps | Goals | Apps | Goals | Apps | Goals |
|---|---|---|---|---|---|---|---|---|---|---|---|---|
| Valencia B | 2021–22 | Tercera Federación | 22 | 0 | — | | — | | — | | 22 | 0 |
| Badajoz (loan) | 2022–23 | Primera Federación | 13 | 0 | — | | — | | — | | 13 | 0 |
| Intercity (loan) | 2022–23 | Primera Federación | 14 | 0 | — | | — | | — | | 14 | 0 |
| Intercity | 2023–24 | Primera Federación | 19 | 0 | — | | — | | — | | 19 | 0 |
| Intercity | 2024–25 | Primera Federación | 29 | 1 | — | | — | | — | | 29 | 1 |
| Intercity | Total | | 48 | 1 | — | | — | | — | | 48 | 1 |
| Alianza Lima | 2025 | Peruvian Primera División | 6 | 0 | — | | 2 (Note: Appearances in Copa Sudamericana) | 0 | — | | 8 | 0 |
| Career total | | | 103 | 1 | 0 | 0 | 2 | 0 | 0 | 0 | 105 | 1 |
