= Joseda Menargues =

Spanish footballer

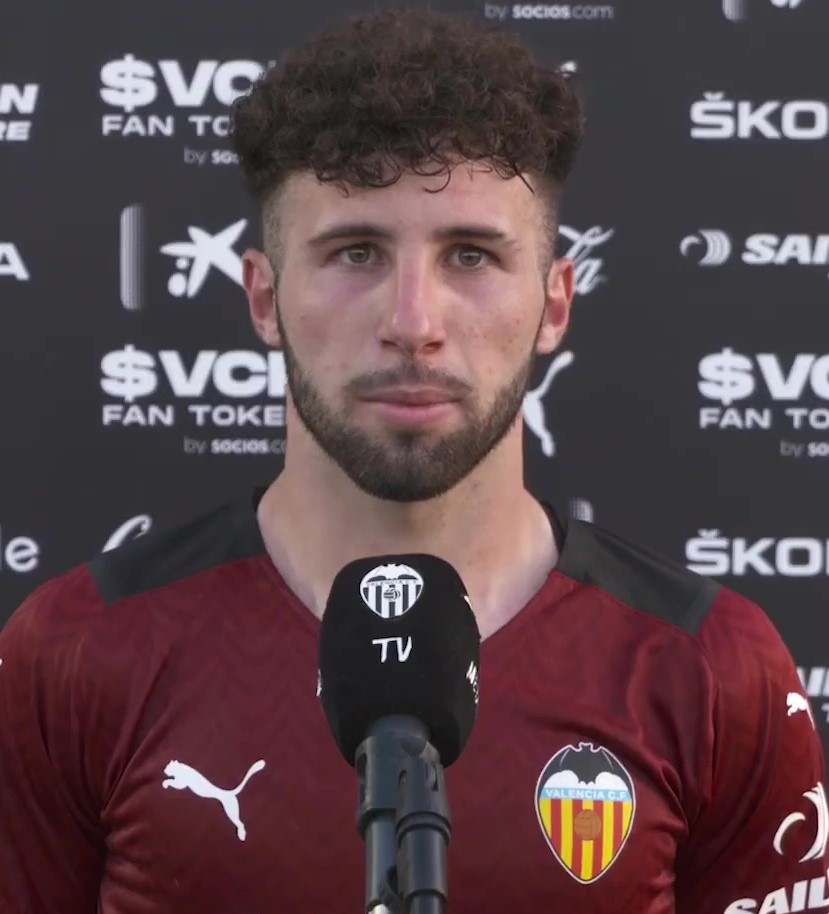

Personal information
- Full name: José David Menargues Manzanares
- Date of birth: 1 May 2002 (age 24)
- Place of birth: Murcia, Spain
- Height: 1.81 m (5 ft 11 in)
- Position: Right-back

Team information
- Current team: Gimnàstic

Youth career
- Valencia

Senior career*
Years	Team	Apps	(Gls)
2019–2023	Valencia B	73	(4)
2023–2024	Ibiza	19	(0)
2024–2025	Villarreal B	32	(1)
2025–2026	Teruel	33	(0)
2026–	Gimnàstic	0	(0)

International career
2018–2019	Spain U17	20	(0)
2020	Spain U18	2	(1)
- * Club domestic league appearances and goals as of 10 June 2026

José David "Joseda" Menargues Manzanares (born 1 May 2002) is a Spanish footballer who plays as a right-back for Gimnàstic de Tarragona.

== Club career ==
=== Valencia ===
Born in Murcia, Menargues was a Valencia CF youth graduate. He made his senior debut with the reserves at the age of 17 on 25 August 2019, starting in a 2–1 Segunda División B home loss against Lleida Esportiu.

In July 2020, Menargues renewed his contract with Valencia until 2023, and was definitely promoted to the B-team. He scored his first senior goal on 29 November of that year, netting the opener for the B's in a 1–1 draw at Villarreal CF B.

Menargues subsequently became a regular starter for the Che, suffering relegation to the new Tercera División RFEF in 2021 but achieving promotion to Segunda Federación at first attempt.

=== Ibiza ===
On 2 January 2023, Menargues joined Segunda División side UD Ibiza on a 18-month contract. He made his professional debut six days later, starting in a 1–0 loss at SD Eibar.

=== Villarreal ===
On 19 June 2024, Menargues agreed to a one-year deal with Villarreal CF, being assigned to the B-team in Primera Federación. Regularly used, he scored once in 32 matches during the campaign.

=== Teruel ===
On 7 September 2025, free agent Menargues joined CD Teruel also in the third tier. He immediately became a first-choice, featuring in 34 matches overall.

=== Gimnàstic ===
On 21 June 2026, Gimnàstic de Tarragona announced the signing of Menargues on a two-year contract.
