= Javi Jiménez (footballer, born 1997) =

Spanish footballer

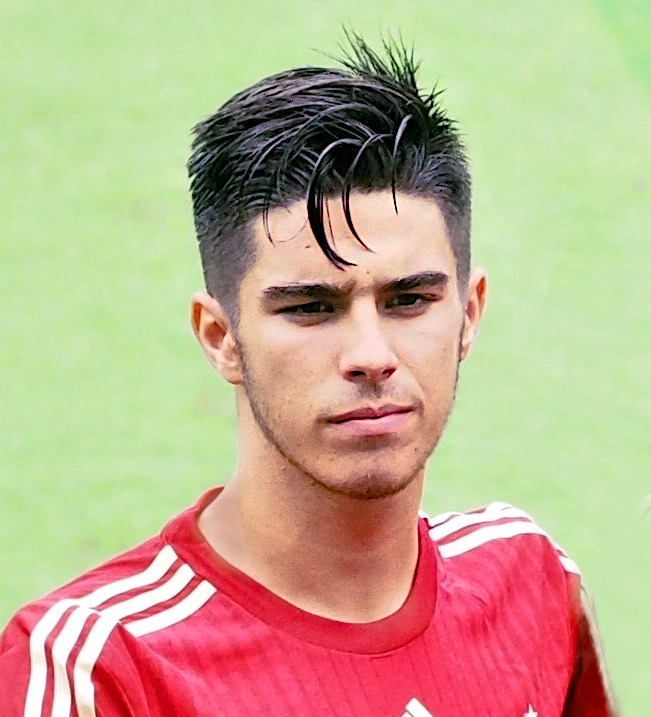
- Jiménez with Spain U18 in 2015

Personal information
- Full name: Javier Jiménez García
- Date of birth: 11 March 1997 (age 29)
- Place of birth: Aldaia, Spain
- Height: 1.82 m (5 ft 11 1/2 in)
- Position: Centre back

Team information
- Current team: Alzira
- Number: 4

Youth career
- 2003–2016: Valencia

Senior career*
Years	Team	Apps	(Gls)
2015–2020	Valencia B	67	(1)
2017–2021	Valencia	0	(0)
2020–2021	→ Albacete (loan)	6	(0)
2021–2023	Albacete	22	(0)
2023	Alcorcón	0	(0)
2023	Cornellà	2	(0)
2024	Alcoyano	7	(0)
2024–	Alzira	7	(0)

International career
2015	Spain U18	1	(0)
- * Club domestic league appearances and goals as of 13 October 2024

Javier Jiménez García (born 11 March 1997) is a Spanish professional footballer who plays as a central defender for Alzira.

== Club career ==
Born in Aldaia, Valencia, Jiménez was a Valencia CF youth graduate. He made his debut as a senior with the reserves on 15 February 2015, starting in a 1–3 away loss against Gimnàstic de Tarragona in the Segunda División B.

On 15 August 2015 Jiménez signed a new contract with the Che, agreeing to a five-year deal. He made his first-team debut on 3 January 2017, starting in a 1–4 Copa del Rey home loss against Celta de Vigo; he also committed a penalty and scored an own goal during the match.

On 13 August 2020, Jiménez moved to Segunda División side Albacete Balompié on loan for the season. In June 2021, after the club's relegation, he signed a permanent contract with them, and helped in their return to the second level at first attempt with 22 appearances.

On 31 January 2023, after failing to play a single minute in the first half of the 2022–23 season, he terminated his contract with Alba.

== Personal life ==
Jiménez's younger brother Pablo is also a footballer. A forward, he was also at Valencia's youth setup.
