= Giorgi Mamardashvili =

Georgian footballer (born 2000)

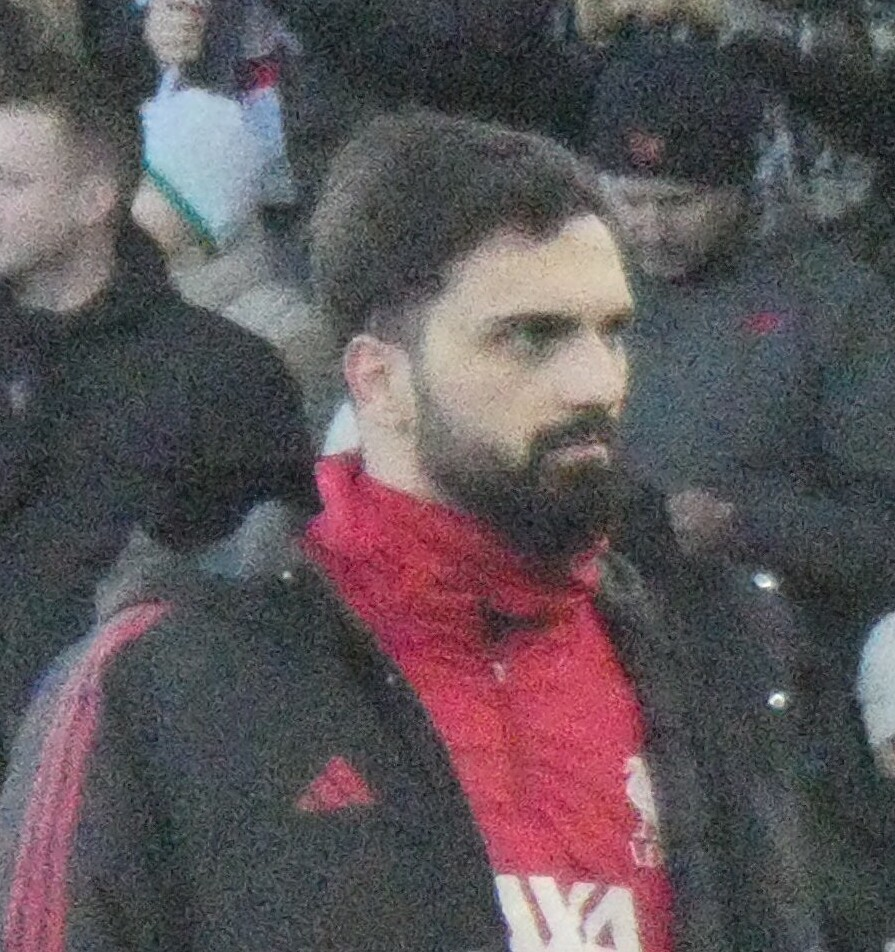
- Mamardashvili with Liverpool in 2026

Personal information
- Full name: Giorgi Mamardashvili
- Date of birth: 29 September 2000 (age 26)
- Place of birth: Tbilisi, Georgia
- Height: 1.97 m (6 ft 6 in)
- Position: Goalkeeper

Team information
- Current team: Liverpool
- Number: 25

Youth career
- 2010–2012: Gagra
- 2012–2018: Dinamo Tbilisi

Senior career*
Years	Team	Apps	(Gls)
2018–2021	Dinamo Tbilisi	0	(0)
2019–2020	→ Rustavi (loan)	28	(0)
2020–2021	→ Locomotive Tbilisi (loan)	29	(0)
2021–2025	Valencia	127	(0)
2025–	Liverpool	10	(0)

International career^{‡}
2016	Georgia U17	1	(0)
2019–2023	Georgia U21	7	(0)
2021–	Georgia	44	(0)
- * Club domestic league appearances and goals as of 15 May 2026 ‡ National team caps and goals as of 17 November 2026

Giorgi Mamardashvili (Georgian: გიორგი მამარდაშვილი; born 29 September 2000) is a Georgian professional footballer who plays as a goalkeeper for Premier League club Liverpool and the Georgia national team.

Mamardashvili spent much of his youth years at Dinamo Tbilisi. After signing a professional contract with this club, he was loaned to other Erovnuli Liga teams for three seasons before his transfer to Valencia. He has quickly established himself as a first-choice shot-stopper, becoming the first ever Georgian goalkeeper in the Spanish top tier.

In 2020 and 2024 respectively, Mamardashvili was named as Goalkeeper of the Year and Footballer of the Year in Georgia.

== Club career ==
=== Dinamo Tbilisi ===
Born in Tbilisi, Mamardashvili joined Dinamo Tbilisi's youth setup in 2012, from Gagra. After featuring as an unused substitute in the first team for most of the 2018 season, he was loaned to Rustavi for the 2019 campaign.

==== Loan to Rustavi ====
Mamardashvili made his senior debut on 2 March 2019, starting in a 4–1 away loss against Locomotive Tbilisi. After contributing with 28 appearances and helping his side to avoid relegation, he made another loan move to Locomotive Tbilisi.

==== Loan to Locomotive Tbilisi ====
Mamardashvili was hailed during Locomotive's UEFA Europa League campaign in 2020. According to newspaper Marca, his performance against Granada drew attention from Spanish scouts.

In late December, he received the Goalkeeper of the Year award from the Georgian Football Federation.

In January 2021, he was named by UEFA as one of 50 young talents expected to shine in the future.

=== Valencia ===
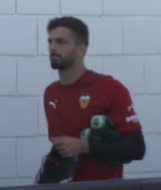
Mamardashvili in 2021 with Valencia

On 7 June 2021, Mamardashvili joined La Liga club Valencia on a one-year loan deal, with a buyout clause, and was initially assigned to the reserves in Tercera División RFEF. He made the pre-season with the main squad, impressing manager José Bordalás and earning himself the starting spot in the league opener against Getafe on 13 August, which ended 1–0 for Los Che.

On 31 December 2021, Valencia confirmed the permanent signing of Mamardashvili on a contract until 2024, with an option for a further year.

During that season, Mamardashvili participated in 18 league matches and kept eight clean sheets. He recorded 560 minutes in a row without conceding a goal. He was twice included in La Liga's symbolic team of the week (Matchweeks 1 and 35). Additionally, he received the player of the match award on three occasions. In May 2022, Marca named Mamardashvili in the La Liga's Discovery of the Season team.

The next season Mamardashvili took part in all 38 league games without being substituted. He was selected in La Liga's team of the week three times. Based on votes from Valencia fans, Mamardashvili was named the best player in 2023, while he had come 2nd behind Gonçalo Guedes the previous year.

On 28 January 2024, Mamardashvili became part of club history. He broke the team record with his 60th consecutive appearance in La Liga as a starter. Eventually, he played in 69 league matches in a row. Overall, during his third season at the club Mamardashvili continued to achieve impressive results, namely, improving his clean sheet record (13), saving the most penalties (3) along with Unai Simon and preventing the most goals in La Liga.

Based on his performances this season, Mamardashvili was nominated for the Yashin trophy annually awarded by France Football to the best goalkeeper in world football.

=== Liverpool ===
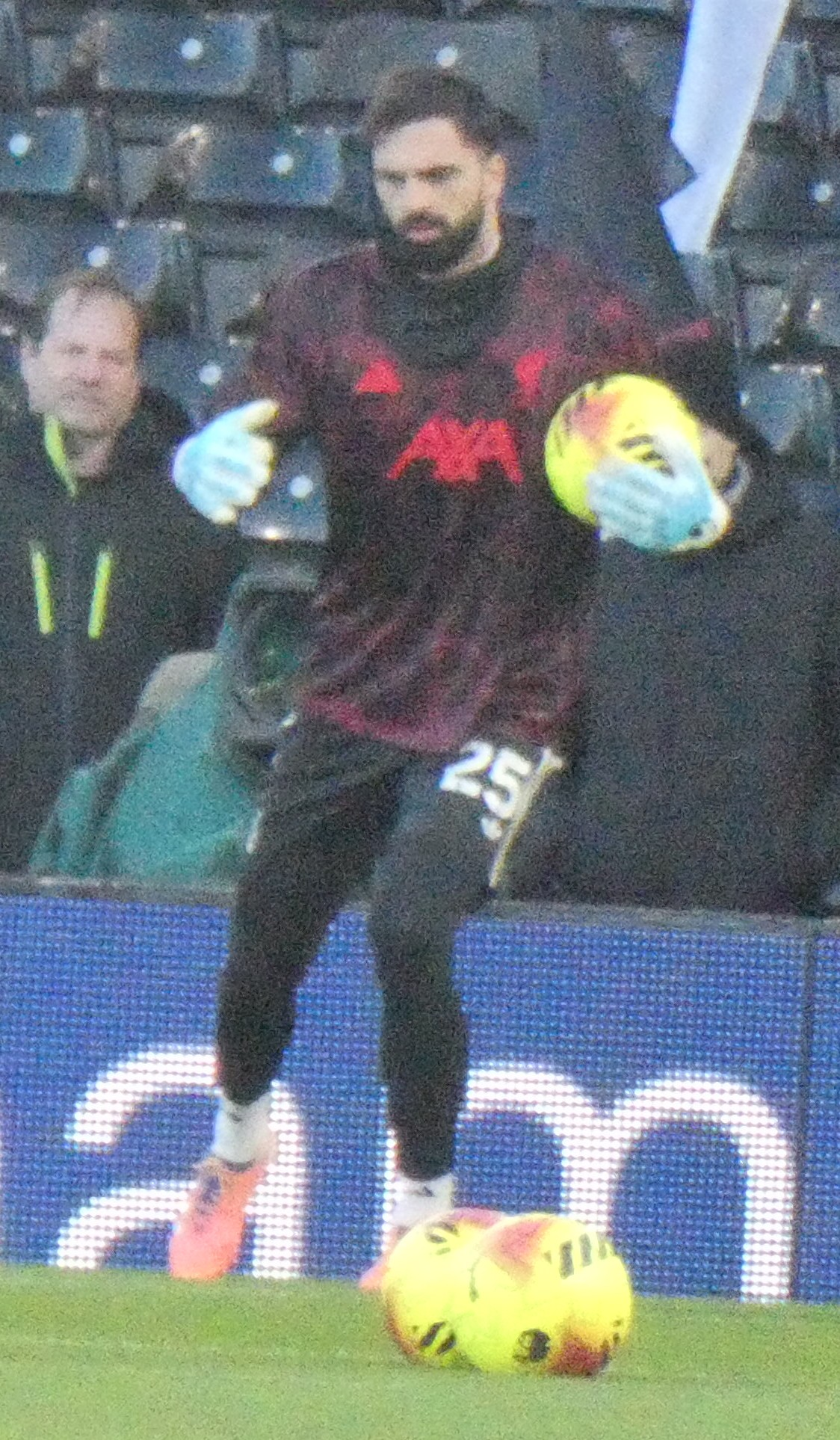
Mamardashvili warming up for Liverpool in 2026

On 27 August 2024, Valencia and Premier League club Liverpool confirmed that Mamardashvili would be joining the latter at the start of the 2025–26 season, becoming the first Georgian to play for the club. On 23 September 2025, he made his debut for Liverpool in a 2–1 win against Southampton in the EFL Cup third round.

== International career ==
After making three appearances for the under-21 team, Mamardashvili made his debut for the senior Georgia national team in a 4–1 friendly defeat against Bulgaria on 8 September 2021.

On 9 June 2022, he played his first official match in a 3–0 win over North Macedonia in the 2022–23 UEFA Nations League. For his performance in the return leg (2–0) in September, Mamardashvili was named in Team of the Week after round 5, and whoscored.com included him in monthly and seasonal Best XI of League C.

In the summer of 2023, Mamardashvili took part in three games in UEFA European Under-21 Championship for Georgia U21s, who had a highly successful group stage campaign and reached quarter-finals for the first time in their history.

On 26 March 2024, Georgia defeated Greece 4–2 in a penalty shoot-out in the play-off final to qualify for UEFA Euro 2024, the nation's first ever major international tournament. Mamardashvili was a critical factor in this game, saving the first spot kick from Greek forward Anastasios Bakasetas.

Mamardashvili was selected by Georgia for the Euro 2024 finals in Germany. He started in his side's first match in a major competition, a 3–1 loss against Turkey on 19 June. After making eleven saves in the next game against the Czech Republic, Mamardashvili received the player of the match award. Analytical sites such as Sofascore, Marca and 90min.com named him in the team of match day 2, with the former awarding him the second highest aggregate rating point after Spanish midfielder Fabián Ruiz. In the team's third Group F match, Mamardashvili kept a clean sheet against Portugal, as Georgia won 2–0 to qualify for the knockout stage. He ended the group stage having made 20 saves, seven more than any other goalkeeper at the tournament.

Mamardashvili continued to impress in the 2026–27 UEFA Nations League as well. Sofascore and Besoccer named him in Team of the Week after his brilliant saves in Georgia's goalless draw against Northern Ireland in round 4.

== Personal life ==
Mamardashvili is the son of former WIT Georgia and Torpedo Kutaisi goalkeeper Davit Mamardashvili, who after retirement became a goalkeeping coach at Merani Martvili and later Torpedo Kutaisi.

Mamardashvili started a relationship with model Elene Epitashvili in 2021. The couple married on 18 July 2024. On 22 November 2024, their daughter Eni was born.

== Career statistics ==
=== Club ===
As of match played 28 October 2026

Appearances and goals by club, season and competition
Club	Season	League			National cup (Note: Includes Georgian Cup, Copa del Rey, FA Cup)		League cup (Note: Includes EFL Cup)		Europe		Other		Total	
Club	Season	Division	Apps	Goals	Apps	Goals	Apps	Goals	Apps	Goals	Apps	Goals	Apps	Goals
Dinamo Tbilisi	2018	Erovnuli Liga	0	0	0	0	—		—		—		0	0
Rustavi (loan)	2019	Erovnuli Liga	28	0	2	0	—		—		2 (Note: Appearances in Erovnuli Liga relegation play-offs)	0	32	0
Locomotive Tbilisi (loan)	2020	Erovnuli Liga	11	0	1	0	—		—		—		12	0
Locomotive Tbilisi (loan)	2021	Erovnuli Liga	18	0	2	0	—		3 (Note: Appearances in UEFA Europa League)	0	—		23	0
Locomotive Tbilisi (loan)	Total		29	0	3	0	—		3	0	—		35	0
Valencia	2021–22	La Liga	18	0	3	0	—		—		—		21	0
Valencia	2022–23	La Liga	38	0	3	0	—		—		1 (Note: Appearance in Supercopa de España)	0	42	0
Valencia	2023–24	La Liga	37	0	0	0	—		—		—		37	0
Valencia	2024–25	La Liga	34	0	0	0	—		—		—		34	0
Valencia	Total		127	0	6	0	—		—		1	0	134	0
Liverpool	2025–26	Premier League	10	0	2	0	1	0	7 (Note: Appearances in UEFA Champions League)	0	0	0	20	0
Liverpool	2026–27	Premier League	0	0	0	0	2	0	0	0	0	0	2	0
Total			10	0	2	0	3	0	7	0	0	0	22	0
Career total			194	0	13	0	3	0	10	0	3	0	223	0

=== International ===
As of match played 17 November 2026

Appearances and goals by national team and year
National team	Year	Apps	Goals
Georgia	2021	1	0
Georgia	2022	5	0
Georgia	2023	8	0
Georgia	2024	13	0
Georgia	2025	8	0
Georgia	2026	9	0
Total		44	0

== Honours ==
Dinamo Tbilisi

- Erovnuli Liga runner-up: 2018

Valencia

- Copa del Rey runner-up: 2021–22

Individual

- Erovnuli Liga Team of the Year: 2020
- Goalkeeper of the Year in Georgia: 2020
- Georgian Footballer of the Year: 2024
