= 2019 Segunda División play-offs =

Segunda División play-offs
- Season: 2018–19
- Promoted: Mallorca
- Matches: 6
- Goals: 15 (2.5 per match)

The 2018–19 Segunda División play-offs were played from 12 June to 23 June 2019 and determined the third team promoted to La Liga for the following season. Teams placed between 3rd and 6th position took part in the promotion play-offs.

== Regulations ==
The regulations were the same as the previous season: in the semi-finals, the fifth-placed team faced the fourth-placed team, while the sixth-placed team faced the third. Each tie was played over two legs, with the team lower in the table hosting the first leg.

The team that scored more goals on aggregate over the two legs advanced to the next round. If the aggregate score was level, the away goals rule was applied (i.e., the team that scored more goals away from home over the two legs advanced). If away goals were also equal, then thirty minutes of extra time would be played. The away goals rule would again be applied after extra time (i.e., if there were goals scored during extra time and the aggregate score was still level, the visiting team advanced by virtue of more away goals scored). If no goals were scored during extra time, the winner would be the best positioned team in the regular season.

== Road to the play-offs ==
Pos	Team	Pld	W	D	L	GF	GA	GD	Pts	Promotion, qualification or relegation
3	Málaga	42	21	11	10	51	31	+20	74	Qualification to promotion play-offs
4	Albacete	42	19	14	9	54	38	+16	71	Qualification to promotion play-offs
5	Mallorca (O, P)	42	19	12	11	53	37	+16	69	Qualification to promotion play-offs
6	Deportivo La Coruña	42	17	17	8	50	32	+18	68	Qualification to promotion play-offs

Source: La Liga
Rules for classification: 1) points; 2) head-to-head points; 3) head-to-head goal difference; 4) goal difference; 5) number of goals scored
(O) Play-off winners; (P) Promoted

Albacete were the first team to guarantee a finish of 6th or better, accomplished with a victory over Sporting Gijón on 25 May. Their chance at earning direct promotion ended with defeat to 4th place Málaga on 4 June. The simultaneous result of Granada picking up a point against 5th place Mallorca would have been good enough by itself for the club to earn direct promotion alongside Osasuna. Málaga's victory guaranteed their participation in the play-offs, and Mallorca's draw, combined with Cádiz's defeat to Extremadura, was enough to guarantee their participation as well. After the penultimate match day on 4 June, Albacete had guaranteed a 3rd or 4th place finish and that they would host the second leg of the semifinal round. The final club to confirm their participation was Deportivo La Coruña, who defeated relegated Córdoba on 8 June. Cádiz and Oviedo were both in contention for the final play-off place, but they both lost on the final match day. Mallorca's draw with Extremadura on the last match day was enough for them to finish 5th, while Albacete's defeat to Almería meant they would finish 4th, three points behind Málaga, who beat Elche.

Coming off their relegation from the top flight, Málaga were leading the league in the months of September and October, having won 8 of their first 11 games. Despite losing their advantage on the direct promotion places, the Andalusian club remained strongly in the play-off chase, only falling out of the play-off places on one occasion.

Albacete entered the season seeking a return to the top flight after 14 seasons out. One defeat in eighteen between the middle of October and the end of February vaulted them up the table, leading the league for the first time on 10 February. They remained in the top three for the rest of the season, until their defeat to Málaga on 4 June. Albacete finished with the league's second best offense, and were led by goalscorers Jérémie Bela and Roman Zozulya, each with 11.

Mallorca returned to the second tier at the first attempt after spending a season out of the top two divisions for the first time in almost 40 years. Around the play-off places throughout the season, a late season push of six wins in eight, plus three points picked up from the expelled Reus, helped cement the Balearic club's place in the play-offs.

Deportivo La Coruña (abbreviated Dépor) were also seeking an immediate return to La Liga, and the Galician club established themselves as early contenders with just one defeat in their first eighteen games. However, a winless run from the middle of February to the middle of April jeopardized their chances, and they fell out of the play-off places. They were helped out by the form of promotion rivals Cádiz, who finished without a win in their final seven games, whereas Dépor had four wins in the same period, enough to finish in 6th position with a four point cushion. Both Dépor and Málaga sacked their managers in April, despite both clubs being in the play-off places at the time of their managers' departures. The two clubs also had the league's joint-second best defense.

== Bracket ==
Semi-finals
Deportivo La Coruña	4	1	5
Málaga	2	0	2
Mallorca	2	0	2
Albacete	0	1	1

Final
Deportivo La Coruña	2	0	2
Mallorca	0	3	3

=== Semi-finals ===
Team 1	Agg.	Team 2	1st leg	2nd leg
Deportivo La Coruña	5–2	Málaga	4–2	1–0
Mallorca	2–1	Albacete	2–0	0–1

==== First legs ====
12 June 2019
21:00 (CEST)

Deportivo La Coruña	4–2	Málaga
C. Fernández 21' (pen.), 63'; Pedro 56'; Valle 78'	Report	L. Hernández 18'; Ontiveros 37'

Abanca Riazor, A Coruña
Attendance: 24,267
Referee: César Soto Grado

Deportivo La Coruña	Málaga

GK	1	(Spain) Dani Giménez
LB	3	(Spain) Saúl García
CB	12	(Italy) Michele Somma
CB	6	(Portugal) Domingos Duarte
RB	2	(Spain) David Simón
LW	15	(Spain) Pedro Sánchez	(yellow card) 13'	(substituted off) 69'
CM	21	(Spain) Edu Expósito
CM	4	(Spain) Álex Bergantiños (c)
RW	11	(Argentina) Fede Cartabia		(substituted off) 81'
CF	19	(Spain) Borja Valle		(substituted off) 85'
CF	18	(Spain) Carlos Fernández
Substitutions:
GK	13	(Spain) Adrián Ortolá
DF	17	(Spain) Diego Caballo		(substituted on) 81'
DF	24	(Spain) Eneko Bóveda
MF	8	(Spain) Vicente Gómez		(substituted on) 85'
MF	10	(Spain) Matías Nahuel		(substituted on) 69'
FW	7	(Spain) Quique
FW	9	(Venezuela) Christian Santos
Manager:
(Spain) José Luis Martí

GK	1	(Morocco) Munir
LB	15	(Uruguay) Federico Ricca (c)
CB	5	(Spain) Pau Torres		(substituted off) 80'
CB	4	(Spain) Luis Hernández
RB	29	(Spain) Iván Rodríguez	(yellow card) 25'
DM	35	(Albania) Keidi Bare	(yellow card) 30'
LW	17	(Spain) Javi Ontiveros	(yellow card) 90+1'
CM	8	(Spain) Adrián		(substituted off) 66'
CM	14	(Morocco) Badr Boulahroud		(substituted off) 66'
RW	11	(Portugal) Renato Santos
CF	9	(Argentina) Gustavo Leschuk
Substitutions:
GK	25	(Poland) Paweł Kieszek
DF	3	(Spain) Diego González		(substituted on) 80'
DF	23	(Spain) Miguel Torres
MF	20	(Spain) Erik Morán		(substituted on) 66'
MF	22	(Spain) Dani Pacheco		(substituted on) 66'
MF	31	(Morocco) Hicham
FW	24	(Ivory Coast) Mamadou Koné
Manager:
(Spain) Víctor Sánchez

13 June 2019
21:00 (CEST)

Mallorca	2–0	Albacete
Suárez 23'; Rodríguez 89'	Report

Son Moix, Palma de Mallorca
Attendance: 12,232
Referee: Juan Luis Pulido Santana

Mallorca	Albacete

GK	1	(Spain) Manolo Reina (c)
LB	30	(Ecuador) Pervis Estupiñán
CB	21	(Spain) Antonio Raíllo
CB	24	(Slovakia) Martin Valjent
RB	2	(Spain) Joan Sastre
DM	6	(Spain) Marc Pedraza
LW	11	(Ivory Coast) Lago Junior
CM	14	(Spain) Dani Rodríguez	(yellow card) 59'
CM	8	(Spain) Salva Sevilla	(yellow card) 77'	(substituted off) 90'
RW	41	(Argentina) Leonardo Suárez		(substituted off) 72'
CF	9	(Spain) Abdón Prats		(substituted off) 74'
Substitutions:
GK	25	(Spain) Miquel Parera
DF	5	(Spain) Xisco Campos
DF	15	(Spain) Fran Gámez
MF	28	(Ghana) Iddrisu Baba		(substituted on) 90'
FW	7	(Spain) Aridai Cabrera		(substituted on) 72'
FW	10	(Spain) Álex López		(substituted on) 74'
FW	19	(Spain) Stoichkov
Manager:
(Spain) Vicente Moreno

GK	13	(Spain) Tomeu Nadal (c)
LB	3	(Spain) Fran García
CB	19	(Argentina) Santiago Gentiletti
CB	4	(Argentina) Nico Gorosito	(yellow card) 19'
RB	23	(Spain) Álvaro Tejero
LM	24	(France) Jérémie Bela
CM	8	(Spain) Aleix Febas
CM	12	(Colombia) Daniel Torres	(yellow card) 90+1'
RM	7	(Spain) Néstor Susaeta		(substituted off) 82'
CF	10	(Ukraine) Roman Zozulya
CF	22	(Albania) Rey Manaj	(yellow card) 61'	(substituted off) 67'
Substitutions:
GK	1	(Spain) Churripi
DF	16	(Spain) José Antonio Caro
DF	21	(Spain) Borja Herrera
MF	11	(Martinique) Mickaël Malsa	(yellow card) 88'	(substituted on) 82'
MF	14	(Spain) Diego Barri
MF	17	(Spain) Eugeni		(substituted on) 86'
FW	15	(Paraguay) Javier Acuña		(substituted on) 67' (substituted off) 86'
Manager:
(Spain) Luis Miguel Ramis

==== Second legs ====
15 June 2019
21:00 (CEST)

Málaga	0–1	Deportivo La Coruña
	Report	Bergantiños 82'

La Rosaleda, Málaga
Attendance: 27,450
Referee: Isidro Díaz de Mera Escuderos

Málaga	Deportivo La Coruña

GK	1	(Morocco) Munir
LB	7	(Spain) Juankar
CB	5	(Spain) Pau Torres
CB	4	(Spain) Luis Hernández	(yellow card) 10'
RB	12	(Spain) Cifu		(substituted off) 82'
LW	17	(Spain) Javi Ontiveros	(yellow card) 89'
CM	8	(Spain) Adrián (c)	(yellow card) 75'
CM	35	(Albania) Keidi Bare	(yellow card) 41'
RW	31	(Morocco) Hicham		(substituted off) 46'
CF	9	(Argentina) Gustavo Leschuk
CF	30	(Scotland) Jack Harper		(substituted off) 55'
Substitutions:
GK	25	(Poland) Paweł Kieszek
DF	3	(Spain) Diego González
DF	15	(Uruguay) Federico Ricca
MF	11	(Portugal) Renato Santos		(substituted on) 46'
MF	20	(Spain) Erik Morán
MF	22	(Spain) Dani Pacheco		(substituted on) 82'
FW	24	(Ivory Coast) Mamadou Koné		(substituted on) 55'
Manager:
(Spain) Víctor Sánchez

GK	1	(Spain) Dani Giménez	(yellow card) 68'
LB	3	(Spain) Saúl García
CB	12	(Italy) Michele Somma
CB	6	(Portugal) Domingos Duarte
RB	24	(Spain) Eneko Bóveda	(yellow card) 35'
DM	21	(Spain) Edu Expósito
DM	4	(Spain) Álex Bergantiños (c)
LW	10	(Spain) Matías Nahuel		(substituted off) 57'
AM	8	(Spain) Vicente Gómez		(substituted off) 52'
RW	15	(Spain) Pedro Sánchez
CF	18	(Spain) Carlos Fernández	(yellow card) 38'	(substituted off) 71'
Substitutions:
GK	13	(Spain) Adrián Ortolá
DF	2	(Spain) David Simón
DF	17	(Spain) Diego Caballo
MF	5	(Spain) Pedro Mosquera
MF	11	(Argentina) Fede Cartabia		(substituted on) 52'
FW	7	(Spain) Quique		(substituted on) 71'
FW	19	(Spain) Borja Valle		(substituted on) 57'
Manager:
(Spain) José Luis Martí

16 June 2019
21:00 (CEST)

Albacete	1–0	Mallorca
Bela 16'	Report

Carlos Belmonte, Albacete
Attendance: 13,014
Referee: Figueroa Vázquez

Albacete	Mallorca

GK	13	(Spain) Tomeu Nadal (c)
LB	3	(Spain) Fran García	(yellow card) 74'
CB	19	(Argentina) Santiago Gentiletti
CB	4	(Argentina) Nico Gorosito		(substituted off) 46'
RB	23	(Spain) Álvaro Tejero	(yellow card) 86'
LM	17	(Spain) Eugeni
CM	8	(Spain) Aleix Febas		(substituted off) 69'
CM	12	(Colombia) Daniel Torres	(yellow card) 64'
RM	24	(France) Jérémie Bela		(substituted off) 84'
CF	10	(Ukraine) Roman Zozulya
CF	22	(Albania) Rey Manaj
Substitutions:
GK	1	(Spain) Churripi
DF	16	(Spain) José Antonio Caro		(substituted on) 46'
DF	21	(Spain) Borja Herrera
MF	7	(Spain) Néstor Susaeta		(substituted on) 84'
MF	11	(Martinique) Mickaël Malsa
MF	14	(Spain) Diego Barri		(substituted on) 69'
FW	38	(Spain) Miguel Ángel
Manager:
(Spain) Luis Miguel Ramis

GK	1	(Spain) Manolo Reina (c)
LB	30	(Ecuador) Pervis Estupiñán
CB	21	(Spain) Antonio Raíllo	(yellow card) 32'
CB	24	(Slovakia) Martin Valjent
RB	2	(Spain) Joan Sastre
DM	6	(Spain) Marc Pedraza	(yellow card) 26'
LW	11	(Ivory Coast) Lago Junior	(yellow card) 90+2'	(substituted off) 90+2'
CM	14	(Spain) Dani Rodríguez
CM	8	(Spain) Salva Sevilla
RW	41	(Argentina) Leonardo Suárez		(substituted off) 74'
CF	9	(Spain) Abdón Prats		(substituted off) 65'
Substitutions:
GK	25	(Spain) Miquel Parera
DF	5	(Spain) Xisco Campos
DF	15	(Spain) Fran Gámez
MF	28	(Ghana) Iddrisu Baba
FW	7	(Spain) Aridai Cabrera		(substituted on) 90+2'
FW	10	(Spain) Álex López		(substituted on) 65'
FW	19	(Spain) Stoichkov		(substituted on) 74'
Manager:
(Spain) Vicente Moreno

=== Final ===
Team 1	Agg.	Team 2	1st leg	2nd leg
Deportivo La Coruña	2–3	Mallorca	2–0	0–3

==== First leg ====
20 June 2019
21:00 (CEST)

Deportivo La Coruña	2–0	Mallorca
Cartabia 37'; Quique 79'	Report

Abanca Riazor, A Coruña
Attendance: 29,365
Referee: Trujillo Suárez

Deportivo	Mallorca

GK	1	(Spain) Dani Giménez
LB	3	(Spain) Saúl García
CB	12	(Italy) Michele Somma		(substituted off) 45'
CB	6	(Portugal) Domingos Duarte
RB	24	(Spain) Eneko Bóveda
LW	15	(Spain) Pedro Sánchez	(yellow card) 66'
CM	21	(Spain) Edu Expósito	(yellow card) 45'
CM	4	(Spain) Álex Bergantiños (c)		(substituted off) 43'
RW	11	(Argentina) Fede Cartabia		(substituted off) 83'
CF	18	(Spain) Carlos Fernández
CF	7	(Spain) Quique
Substitutions:
GK	13	(Spain) Adrián Ortolá
DF	2	(Spain) David Simón		(substituted on) 45'
DF	17	(Spain) Diego Caballo
MF	5	(Spain) Pedro Mosquera
MF	8	(Spain) Vicente Gómez		(substituted on) 43'
MF	10	(Spain) Matías Nahuel
FW	19	(Spain) Borja Valle		(substituted on) 83'
Manager:
(Spain) José Luis Martí

GK	1	(Spain) Manolo Reina (c)	(yellow card) 80'
LB	30	(Ecuador) Pervis Estupiñán
CB	21	(Spain) Antonio Raíllo	(yellow card) 90+2'
CB	24	(Slovakia) Martin Valjent
RB	2	(Spain) Joan Sastre	(yellow card) 45'
DM	6	(Spain) Marc Pedraza	(red card) 41'
LW	11	(Ivory Coast) Lago Junior	(yellow card) 54'
CM	14	(Spain) Dani Rodríguez
CM	8	(Spain) Salva Sevilla		(substituted off) 79'
RW	41	(Argentina) Leonardo Suárez	(yellow card) 45'	(substituted off) 52'
CF	9	(Spain) Abdón Prats		(substituted off) 64'
Substitutions:
GK	25	(Spain) Miquel Parera
DF	5	(Spain) Xisco Campos	(yellow card) 45'
DF	15	(Spain) Fran Gámez		(substituted on) 79'
MF	28	(Ghana) Iddrisu Baba		(substituted on) 52'
FW	7	(Spain) Aridai Cabrera
FW	10	(Spain) Álex López
FW	22	(Croatia) Ante Budimir		(substituted on) 64'
Manager:
(Spain) Vicente Moreno

==== Second leg ====
23 June 2019
21:00 (CEST)

Mallorca	3–0	Deportivo La Coruña
Budimir 21'; Salva Sevilla 62'; Abdón 82'	Report

Son Moix, Palma de Mallorca
Attendance: 21,344
Referee: Pizarro Gómez

Mallorca	Deportivo

GK	1	(Spain) Manolo Reina (c)	(yellow card) 85'
LB	30	(Ecuador) Pervis Estupiñán
CB	21	(Spain) Antonio Raíllo
CB	24	(Slovakia) Martin Valjent
RB	2	(Spain) Joan Sastre	(yellow card) 50'	(substituted off) 87'
DM	28	(Ghana) Iddrisu Baba
CM	14	(Spain) Dani Rodríguez
CM	8	(Spain) Salva Sevilla	(yellow card) 89'
LW	11	(Ivory Coast) Lago Junior
CF	22	(Croatia) Ante Budimir		(substituted off) 84'
RW	7	(Spain) Aridai Cabrera		(substituted off) 52'
Substitutions:
GK	25	(Spain) Miquel Parera
DF	5	(Spain) Xisco Campos		(substituted on) 87'
DF	17	(Spain) Salvador Ruiz
FW	9	(Spain) Abdón Prats		(substituted on) 52'
FW	10	(Spain) Álex López		(substituted on) 84'
FW	19	(Spain) Stoichkov
FW	41	(Argentina) Leonardo Suárez
Manager:
(Spain) Vicente Moreno

GK	1	(Spain) Dani Giménez
LB	3	(Spain) Saúl García
CB	22	(Spain) Pablo Marí
CB	6	(Portugal) Domingos Duarte	(yellow card) 54'
RB	24	(Spain) Eneko Bóveda		(substituted off) 88'
LW	15	(Spain) Pedro Sánchez	(yellow card) 78'
CM	21	(Spain) Edu Expósito
CM	8	(Spain) Vicente Gómez
RW	10	(Spain) Matías Nahuel		(substituted off) 30'
CF	19	(Spain) Borja Valle	(yellow card) 56'	(substituted off) 79'
CF	7	(Spain) Quique
Substitutions:
GK	13	(Spain) Adrián Ortolá
DF	2	(Spain) David Simón	(yellow card) 86'
DF	17	(Spain) Diego Caballo		(substituted on) 88'
MF	5	(Spain) Pedro Mosquera
MF	20	(Colombia) Didier Moreno
FW	11	(Argentina) Fede Cartabia		(substituted on) 79'
FW	18	(Spain) Carlos Fernández		(substituted on) 30'
Manager:
(Spain) José Luis Martí

Promoted to La Liga
Mallorca
(6 years later)
