= 2018–19 RCD Mallorca season =

RCD Mallorca
2018–19 season
- Owner: Robert Sarver
- President: Andy Kohlberg
- Head coach: Vicente Moreno
- Stadium: Son Moix
- Segunda División: 5th (Promoted)
- Copa del Rey: Second round
- Top goalscorer: League: Lago Junior (11 goals); All: Lago Junior (11 goals)
Home colours	Away colours

The 2018–19 season was Real Club Deportivo Mallorca's 84th season in existence and the club's 1st season back in the second division of Spanish football. In addition to the domestic league, RCD Mallorca participated in this season's edition of the Copa del Rey. The season covers the period from 1 July 2018 to 30 June 2019.

== Players ==
=== First-team squad ===
As of 31 January 2019

Note: Flags indicate national team as defined under FIFA eligibility rules; some limited exceptions apply. Players may hold more than one non-FIFA nationality.

No.	Pos.	Nation	Player
1	GK	ESP	Manolo Reina
2	DF	ESP	Joan Sastre
4	DF	ARG	Franco Russo
5	DF	ESP	Xisco Campos
6	MF	ESP	Marc Pedraza
7	FW	ESP	Aridai Cabrera
8	MF	ESP	Salva Sevilla
9	FW	ESP	Abdón Prats
10	FW	ESP	Álex López
11	FW	CIV	Lago Junior
13	GK	ESP	Leandro Montagud
14	MF	ESP	Dani Rodríguez
15	DF	ESP	Fran Gámez

No.	Pos.	Nation	Player
17	DF	ESP	Salva Ruiz
18	FW	SRB	Nikola Stojiljković (on loan from S.C. Braga)
19	FW	ESP	Stoichkov
20	FW	ESP	Pablo Valcarce
21	DF	ESP	Antonio Raíllo
22	FW	CRO	Ante Budimir (on loan from Crotone)
24	DF	SVK	Martin Valjent (on loan from Chievo)
25	GK	ESP	Miquel Parera
27	FW	ESP	Sergio Buenacasa
28	MF	GHA	Iddrisu Baba
30	DF	ECU	Pervis Estupiñán (on loan from Watford)
41	MF	ARG	Leonardo Suárez (on loan from Villarreal)

=== Out on loan ===
Note: Flags indicate national team as defined under FIFA eligibility rules; some limited exceptions apply. Players may hold more than one non-FIFA nationality.

No.	Pos.	Nation	Player
—	DF	FRA	Pierre Cornud (on loan at Linense until 30 June 2019)
—	DF	ESP	Jaume Pol (on loan at Olot until 30 June 2019)
—	MF	ESP	Fernando Cano (on loan at Lleida Esportiu until 30 June 2019)
—	MF	ARG	Alejandro Faurlín (on loan at Marbella until 30 June 2019)
—	MF	PER	Bryan Reyna (on loan at Alcoyano until 30 June 2019)

No.	Pos.	Nation	Player
—	MF	ESP	Antonio Sánchez (on loan at Barakaldo until 30 June 2019)
—	FW	ESP	Moyita (on loan at Cartagena until 30 June 2019)
—	FW	ESP	Pol Roigé (on loan at Hércules until 30 June 2019)
—	FW	ESP	Néstor Salinas (on loan at Tudelano until 30 June 2019)
-	FW	ESP	Carlos Castro (on loan at Elche until 30 June 2019)

== Pre-season and friendlies ==
Win Draw Loss

22 July 2018 Friendly	Mallorca	5–0	Felanitx	Sa Pobla, Spain
19:30 CEST (UTC+2)				Stadium: Estadio Municipal de Sa Pobla

25 July 2018 Friendly	Constància	0–9	Mallorca	Inca, Spain
18:30 CEST (UTC+2)				Stadium: Nou Camp d'Inca

2 August 2018 Friendly	Linense	0–2	Mallorca	La Línea de la Concepción, Spain
20:30 CEST (UTC+2)				Stadium: Estadio Municipal de La Línea de la Concepción

5 August 2018 Friendly	Cádiz	2–1	Mallorca	Cádiz, Spain
20:30 CEST (UTC+2)				Stadium: Ramón de Carranza

8 August 2018 Friendly	Málaga	0–0	Mallorca	Marbella, Spain
20:25 CEST (UTC+2)				Stadium: Estadio Municipal Antonio Lorenzo Cuevas

11 August 2018 Friendly	Mallorca	3–2	Alcorcón	Palma, Spain
20:30 CEST (UTC+2)				Stadium: Son Moix

16 January 2019 Friendly	Mallorca	1–0	1. FC Köln	Palma, Spain
11:00 CET (UTC+1)	Gámez 72'			Stadium: Son Moix

== Competitions ==
=== Overview ===
Competition	First match	Last match	Starting round	Final position	Record							
Competition	First match	Last match	Starting round	Final position	Pld	W	D	L	GF	GA	GD	Win %
Segunda División	18 August 2018	23 June 2019	Matchday 1	5th	42	19	12	11	53	37	+16	45.24
Copa del Rey	11 September 2018	5 December 2018	Second round	Round of 32	3	1	0	2	3	4	−1	33.33
Total					45	20	12	13	56	41	+15	44.44

Last updated: 23 June 2019
Source: Competitions

=== Segunda División ===
==== League table ====
Pos	Team	Pld	W	D	L	GF	GA	GD	Pts	Promotion, qualification or relegation
3	Málaga	42	21	11	10	51	31	+20	74	Qualification to promotion play-offs
4	Albacete	42	19	14	9	54	38	+16	71	Qualification to promotion play-offs
5	Mallorca (O, P)	42	19	12	11	53	37	+16	69	Qualification to promotion play-offs
6	Deportivo La Coruña	42	17	17	8	50	32	+18	68	Qualification to promotion play-offs
7	Cádiz	42	16	16	10	53	36	+17	64	

Source: La Liga
Rules for classification: 1) points; 2) head-to-head points; 3) head-to-head goal difference; 4) goal difference; 5) number of goals scored
(O) Play-off winners; (P) Promoted

==== Results summary ====
Overall								Home						Away					
Pld	W	D	L	GF	GA	GD	Pts	W	D	L	GF	GA	GD	W	D	L	GF	GA	GD
42	19	12	11	53	37	+16	69	15	4	2	35	12	+23	4	8	9	18	25	−7

Last updated: 8 June 2019.
Source: La Liga SmartBank

==== Results by round ====
Round	1	2	3	4	5	6	7	8	9	10	11	12	13	14	15	16	17	18	19	20	21	22	23	24	25	26	27	28	29	30	31	32	33	34	35	36	37	38	39	40	41	42
Ground	A	H	A	H	A	H	A	H	A	H	H	A	H	A	H	A	H	A	H	A	H	A	H	A	H	A	A	H	A	H	H	A	H	A	H	A	H	A	H	A	H	A
Result	W	W	L	W	D	L	D	W	L	D	D	D	W	D	W	W	L	L	W	L	W	L	D	W	L	W	D	D	W	W	W	L	W	D	W	W	W	L	W	L	D	D
Position	5	2	3	2	4	7	8	6	6	6	7	8	7	8	6	6	7	8	8	8	8	8	8	7	9	8	8	9	7	6	6	7	6	5	5	4	4	4	4	5	5	5

Updated to match(es) played on 8 June 2019. Source: La Liga SmartBank
A = Away; H = Home; W = Win; D = Draw; L = Loss

==== Matches ====
The fixtures were revealed on 24 July 2018.

19 August 2018 1	Mallorca	1–0	Osasuna	Palma
19:00 CEST (UTC+2)		Report		Stadium: Son Moix; Referee: Dámaso Arcediano Monescillo

27 August 2018 2	Rayo Majadahonda	0–1	Mallorca	Madrid
20:00 CEST (UTC+2)		Report		Stadium: Wanda Metropolitano; Attendance: 3,423; Referee: Abraham Domínguez Cervantes

31 August 2018 3	Alcorcón	1–0	Mallorca	Alcorcón
20:00 CEST (UTC+2)		Report		Stadium: Santo Domingo; Referee: Víctor Areces Franco

7 September 2018 4	Mallorca	1–0	Cádiz	Palma
21:00 CEST (UTC+2)		Report		Stadium: Son Moix; Referee: Isidro Díaz de Mera Escuderos

16 September 2018 5	Elche	1–1	Mallorca	Elche
12:00 CEST (UTC+2)		Report		Stadium: Martínez Valero; Referee: Luis Mario Milla Alvendiz

23 September 2018 6	Mallorca	1–3	Albacete	Palma
12:00 CEST (UTC+2)		Report		Stadium: Son Moix; Referee: Gorka Sagués Oscoz

29 September 2018 7	Lugo	1–1	Mallorca	Lugo
16:00 CEST (UTC+2)		Report		Stadium: Anxo Carro; Referee: Rubén Ávalos Barrera

6 October 2018 8	Mallorca	4–1	Tenerife	Palma
16:00 CEST (UTC+2)		Report		Stadium: Son Moix; Referee: Daniel Ocón Arráiz

14 October 2018 9	Granada	1–0	Mallorca	Granada
20:45 CEST (UTC+2)		Report		Stadium: Nuevo Los Cármenes; Referee: Juan Luis Pulido Santana

21 October 2018 10	Mallorca	1–1	Extremadura	Palma
12:00 CEST (UTC+2)		Report		Stadium: Son Moix; Referee: Álvaro Moreno Aragón

27 October 2018 11	Mallorca	2–2	Las Palmas	Palma
18:00 CEST (UTC+2)		Report		Stadium: Son Moix; Referee: David Pérez Pallas

4 November 2018 12	Real Oviedo	1–1	Mallorca	Oviedo
16:00 CET (UTC+1)		Report		Stadium: Carlos Tartiere; Referee: José Antonio López Toca

11 November 2018 13	Mallorca	3–0	Córdoba	Palma
18:00 CET (UTC+1)		Report		Stadium: Son Moix; Referee: Daniel Jesús Trujillo Suárez

17 November 2018 14	Real Zaragoza	2–2	Mallorca	Zaragoza
20:30 CET (UTC+1)		Report		Stadium: La Romareda; Referee: Saúl Ais Reig

25 November 2018 15	Mallorca	1–0	Numancia	Palma
12:00 CET (UTC+1)		Report		Stadium: Son Moix; Referee: Abraham Domínguez Cervantes

1 December 2018 16	Reus	0–2	Mallorca	Reus
18:00 CET (UTC+1)		Report		Stadium: Municipal; Referee: Iñaki Vicandi Garrido

8 December 2018 17	Mallorca	1–2	Málaga	Palma
18:00 CET (UTC+1)		Report		Stadium: Son Moix; Referee: Aitor Gorostegui Fernández-Ortega

15 December 2019 18	Sporting Gijón	1–0	Mallorca	Gijón
20:00 CET (UTC+1)		Report		Stadium: El Molinón; Referee: Álvaro Moreno Aragón

21 December 2018 19	Mallorca	2–0	Gimnàstic	Palma
21:00 CET (UTC+1)		Report		Stadium: Son Moix; Referee: Jorge Figueroa Vázquez

6 January 2019 20	Almería	2–0	Mallorca	Almería
12:00 CET (UTC+1)		Report		Stadium: Juegos Mediterráneos; Referee: Daniel Jesús Trujillo Suárez

12 January 2019 21	Mallorca	1–0	Deportivo La Coruña	Palma
20:30 CET (UTC+1)		Report		Stadium: Son Moix; Referee: Saúl Ais Reig

20 January 2019 22	Osasuna	2–0	Mallorca	Pamplona
12:00 CET (UTC+1)		Report		Stadium: El Sadar; Referee: Gorka Sagués Oscoz

26 January 2019 23	Cádiz	1–1	Mallorca	Cádiz
20:30 CET (UTC+1)		Report		Stadium: Ramón de Carranza; Referee: Dámaso Arcediano Monescillo

3 February 2019 24	Mallorca	2–0	Alcorcón	Palma
12:00 CET (UTC+1)		Report		Stadium: Son Moix; Referee: César Soto Grado

10 February 2019 25	Albacete	2–0	Mallorca	Albacete
16:00 CEST (UTC+2)		Report		Stadium: Carlos Belmonte; Referee: Aitor Gorostegui Fernández-Ortega

17 February 2019 26	Mallorca	3–0	Lugo	Palma
12:00 CET (UTC+1)		Report		Stadium: Son Moix; Referee: Víctor Areces Franco

22 February 2019 27	Tenerife	2–2	Mallorca	Santa Cruz de Tenerife
21:00 CEST (UTC+2)		Report		Stadium: Heliodoro Rodríguez López; Referee: Daniel Ocón Arráiz

3 March 2019 28	Mallorca	1–1	Elche	Palma
12:00 CET (UTC+1)		Report		Stadium: Son Moix; Referee: Valentín Pizarro Gómez

9 March 2019 29	Mallorca	1–0	Real Oviedo	Palma
16:00 CET (UTC+1)		Report		Stadium: Son Moix; Referee: Álvaro Moreno Aragón

17 March 2019 30	Las Palmas	1–2	Mallorca	Las Palmas
20:00 CEST (UTC+2)		Report		Stadium: Gran Canaria; Referee: Jorge Figueroa Vázquez

25 March 2019 31	Mallorca	3–0	Real Zaragoza	Palma
21:00 CET (UTC+1)		Report		Stadium: Son Moix; Referee: Óliver de la Fuente Ramos

31 March 2019 32	Córdoba	3–2	Mallorca	Córdoba
12:00 CEST (UTC+2)		Report		Stadium: El Arcángel; Referee: José Antonio López Toca

7 April 2019 33	Mallorca	1–0	Reus	Palma
16:00 CEST (UTC+2)		Report		Stadium: Son Moix

14 April 2019 34	Numancia	1–1	Mallorca	Soria
16:00 CEST (UTC+2)		Report		Stadium: Los Pajaritos; Referee: Valentín Pizarro Gómez

20 April 2019 35	Mallorca	2–0	Rayo Majadahonda	Palma
20:00 CEST (UTC+2)		Report		Stadium: Son Moix; Referee: Javier Iglesias Villanueva

27 April 2019 36	Málaga	0–1	Mallorca	Málaga
16:15 CEST (UTC+2)		Report		Stadium: La Rosaleda; Referee: David Pérez Pallas

5 May 2019 37	Mallorca	2–1	Sporting Gijón	Palma
16:00 CEST (UTC+2)		Report		Stadium: Son Moix; Referee: Isidro Díaz de Mera Escuderos

11 May 2019 38	Gimnàstic	2–1	Mallorca	Tarragona
16:00 CEST (UTC+2)		Report		Stadium: Nou Estadi; Referee: Abraham Domínguez Cervantes

19 May 2019 39	Mallorca	1–0	Almería	Palma
12:00 CEST (UTC+2)		Report		Stadium: Son Moix; Referee: José Antonio López Toca

27 May 2019 40	Deportivo La Coruña	1–0	Mallorca	A Coruña
21:00 CEST (UTC+2)		Report		Stadium: Abanca-Riazor; Referee: Aitor Gorostegui Fernández-Ortega

4 June 2019 41	Mallorca	1–1	Granada	Palma
21:00 CEST (UTC+2)		Report		Stadium: Son Moix; Referee: Dámaso Arcediano Monescillo

8 June 2019 42	Extremadura	0–0	Mallorca	Almendralejo
20:30 CEST (UTC+2)		Report		Stadium: Francisco de la Hera; Referee: Saúl Ais Reig

=== Copa del Rey ===
11 September 2018 Second round	Mallorca	1–0	Oviedo	Palma de Mallorca
18:45	Giner 58'	Report		Stadium: Son Moix; Attendance: 5,582; Referee: Iñaki Vicandi Garrido

31 October 2018 Round of 32, first leg	Mallorca	1–2	Valladolid	Palma
20:30 CET	Buenacasa 67'	Report	Verde 8', 35'	Stadium: Son Moix; Attendance: 3,121; Referee: David Medié Jiménez

5 December 2018 Round of 32, second leg	Valladolid	2–1 (4–2 agg.)	Mallorca	Valladolid
21:30 CET	Plano 49'; Verde 88'	Report	Abdón 48'	Stadium: José Zorrilla; Attendance: 9,813; Referee: Adrián Cordero Vega
