= 2020–21 RCD Mallorca season =

RCD Mallorca
2020–21 season
- Owner: Robert Sarver
- President: Andy Kohlberg
- Head coach: Luis García Plaza
- Stadium: Visit Mallorca Stadium
- Segunda División: 2nd (promoted)
- Copa del Rey: Second round
- Top goalscorer: League: Amath Ndiaye (8); All: Amath Ndiaye (8)
- Biggest win: Mallorca 2–0 Tenerife (3 October 2020)
- Biggest defeat: Mallorca 0–1 Rayo Vallecano (13 September 2020)
Home colours	Away colours

The 2020–21 RCD Mallorca season was the club's 87th season in existence and the club's first season back in the second division of Spanish football. In addition to the domestic league, Mallorca participated in this season's edition of the Copa del Rey. The season covered the period from 20 July 2020 to 30 June 2021.

== Season overview ==
=== August ===
On 4 August, Mallorca and Espanyol reached an agreement over the finalisation of Vicente Moreno's contract for a sum over €500,000.

On 6 August, the club announced that Luis García Plaza would be the new head coach until June 2022

=== September ===
On 9 September, Brian Oliván joined Mallorca on a free transfer after reaching an agreement with Cádiz CF days before.

On 13 September, Mallorca started their season in a 0–1 home defeat to Rayo Vallecano from a second half winner from Isi

On 17 September, Mallorca and Sporting de Braga reached an agreement for the loan of Murilo de Souza to the Spanish side for the rest of the season with an undisclosed option to buy. Mallorca also reached an agreement with forward Yannis Salibur over his contract termination, and later on, announced the transfer of Jordi Mboula from Ligue 1 side AS Monaco.

On 20 September, Mallorca drew 0–0 away against Vicente Moreno's Espanyol.

On 27 September, Mallorca achieved their first win of the season in a 1–0 home victory against CE Sabadell, a late goal from Dani Rodríguez was enough for the Balearic side to claim victory.

On 28 September, Mallorca signed Braian Cufré from Vélez Sarsfield for €1,200,000. Mallorca will own 60% of the player's rights, in the event of achieving promotion, Mallorca must add an extra 20%. Additionally the Balearic club has the option to buy another 10%. The deal was agreed on 24 September, but his arrival was delayed by the lack of flights between Argentina and Spain due to the COVID-19 pandemic. It was also announced that Mallorca had terminated Pablo Chavarría's contract.

=== October ===
On 1 October, Mallorca terminated Sergio Moyita's contract.

On 3 October, Mallorca defeated Tenerife 2–0 at home. A goal from Martin Valjent and a penalty kick transformed by Dani Rodríguez helped them to claim victory.

== Players ==
=== First-team squad ===
As of 1 February 2021

Note: Flags indicate national team as defined under FIFA eligibility rules; some limited exceptions apply. Players may hold more than one non-FIFA nationality.

No.	Pos.	Nation	Player
1	GK	ESP	Manolo Reina (captain)
2	DF	ESP	Joan Sastre
3	DF	ESP	Brian Oliván
4	MF	ESP	Iñigo Ruiz de Galarreta
5	DF	ARG	Franco Russo
6	MF	ESP	Aleix Febas
7	FW	ESP	Álvaro Giménez (on loan from Cádiz)
8	MF	ESP	Salva Sevilla
9	FW	ESP	Abdón
10	FW	BRA	Murilo (on loan from Braga)
11	FW	CIV	Lago Junior
12	MF	GHA	Iddrisu Baba
13	GK	ESP	Miquel Parera
14	MF	ESP	Dani Rodríguez
15	DF	ESP	Fran Gámez

No.	Pos.	Nation	Player
16	FW	ESP	Jordi Mboula
17	FW	MKD	Aleksandar Trajkovski
18	MF	ESP	Antonio Sánchez
19	DF	ARG	Braian Cufré
20	DF	SRB	Aleksandar Sedlar
21	DF	ESP	Antonio Raíllo (vice-captain)
22	FW	ESP	Marc Cardona (on loan from Osasuna)
23	FW	SEN	Amath Ndiaye (on loan from Getafe)
24	DF	SVK	Martin Valjent
25	GK	ESP	Koke Vegas (on loan from Levante)
26	DF	ESP	Carlos Quintana
28	DF	ESP	Iván Bravo
29	FW	ARG	Luka Romero
35	FW	ESP	Víctor Mollejo (on loan from Atlético Madrid)

== Transfers and loans ==
=== Players in ===
Entry date	Position	No.	Player	From club	Fee	Ref.
30 June 2020	DF	–	(Peru) Bryan Reyna	(Spain) Las Rozas CF	Loan Return	
30 June 2020	FW	–	(Spain) Sergio Moyita	(Spain) R. Majadahonda	Loan Return	
21 July 2020	DF	–	(Argentina) Franco Russo	(Spain) Ponferradina	Loan Return	
21 July 2020	MF	–	(Spain) Iñigo Ruiz de Galarreta	(Spain) UD Las Palmas	Loan Return	
21 July 2020	MF	–	(Spain) Antonio Sánchez	(Spain) Mirandés	Loan Return	
21 July 2020	MF	–	(Spain) Soichkov	(Spain) Alcorcón	Loan Return	
21 July 2020	FW	–	(Spain) Álex Alegría	(Spain) Extremadura	Loan Return	
21 July 2020	FW	–	(Spain) Álex López	(Spain) Extremadura	Loan Return	
21 July 2020	FW	–	(Spain) Sergio Buenacasa	(Spain) Málaga	Loan Return	
21 July 2020	FW	–	(Serbia) Igor Zlatanović	(Spain) Numancia	Loan Return	
21 July 2020	FW	–	(France) Enzo Lombardo	(Spain) Racing	Loan Return	
21 July 2020	FW	–	(Spain) Pablo Valcarce	(Spain) Ponferradina	Loan Return	
21 July 2020	FW	–	(Spain) Carlos Castro	(Spain) Lugo	Loan Return	
27 July 2020	DF	–	(France) Pierre Cornud	(Spain) UD Ibiza-Eivissa	Loan Return	
9 September 2020	DF	–	(Spain) Brian Oliván	(Spain) Cádiz	Free transfer (Note: Cádiz will keep 15% of any future sale.)	
17 September 2020	MF	–	(Brazil) Murilo Costa	(Portugal) Sporting de Braga	Loan	
17 September 2020	FW	–	(Spain) Jordi Mboula	(France) Monaco	Undisclosed	
27 September 2020 (Note: Deal agreed 24 September 2020.)	DF	–	(Argentina) Braian Cufré	(Argentina) Vélez Sarsfield	€1,200,000 (Note: Fee may eventually rise to €1,600,000.) (Note: Vélez Sarsfield will keep 10%-40% of any future sale.)	
Total					€1,200,000	

=== Players Out ===
Exit date	Position	No.	Player	To club	Fee	Ref.
30 June 2020	DF	–	(Ghana) Abdul Rahman Baba	(England) Chelsea	Loan return	
30 June 2020	DF	18	(Greece) Leonardo Koutris	(Greece) Olympiacos	Loan return	
20 July 2020	GK	13	(Spain) Fabri	(England) Fulham	Loan return	
20 July 2020	DF	3	(Ghana) Lumor Agbenyenu	(Portugal) Sporting	Loan return	
20 July 2020	DF	7	(Spain) Alejandro Pozo	(Spain) Sevilla	Loan return	
20 July 2020	MF	10	(South Korea) Ki Sung-yueng	(South Korea) FC Seoul	Released	
20 July 2020	MF	26	(Japan) Takefusa Kubo	(Spain) Real Madrid	Loan return	
20 July 2020	MF	29	(Colombia) Cucho Hernández	(England) Watford	Loan return	
21 July 2020	DF	5	(Spain) Xisco Campos	(Spain) Pontevedra	Released	
21 July 2020	FW	–	(Spain) Carlos Castro		Released	
12 August 2020	MF	6	(Spain) Marc Pedraza	(Spain) FC Andorra	Free	
15 August 2020	DF	–	(France) Pierre Cornud	(Spain) Sabadell	Free	
11 September 2020	FW	–	(Spain) Sergio Buenacasa	(Spain) Hércules	Undisclosed	
17 September 2020	FW	16	(France) Yannis Salibur	(Turkey) Karagümrük	Contract termination	
28 September 2020	FW	19	(Argentina) Pablo Chavarría	(Spain) Málaga	Contract termination	
1 October 2020	FW	–	(Argentina) Sergio Moyita	(Spain) Hércules CF	Contract termination	
Total					€0	

=== Loans Out ===
Start date	End date	Position	No.	Player	To club	Fee	Ref.
14 August 2020	End of season	MF	—	(Spain) Josep Señé	(Spain) Castellón	None	
14 September 2020	End of season	FW	—	(Spain) Pablo Valcarce	(Spain) Ponferradina	None	
18 September 2020	End of season	FW	—	(Serbia) Igor Zlatanović	(Spain) Castellón	None	

=== Transfer summary ===
Undisclosed fees are not included in the transfer totals.

Expenditure

Summer: ▼€1,200,000

Winter: ▼€0

Total: ▼€1,200,000

Income

Summer: ▲€0

Winter: ▲€0

Total: ▲€0

Net totals

Summer: ▼€1,200,000

Winter: €0

Total: ▼€1,200,000

== Pre-season and friendlies ==
Win Draw Loss

27 August 2020 Friendly	Levante	2–1	Mallorca	San Pedro del Pinatar, Spain
21:00 CEST (UTC+2)	De Frutos 2'; Melero 22'; Radoja (yellow card) 71'	Report	Sastre (yellow card) 25'; Salva Sevilla 34'	Stadium: Pinatar Arena; Attendance: 0 Referee: Rafael Sánchez López

29 August 2020 Friendly	Mallorca	2–0	Tenerife	San Pedro del Pinatar, Spain
22:00 CEST (UTC+2)	Abdón (yellow card) 25'; Sedlar (yellow card) 36'; Trajkovski 82'; Stoichkov 85'	Report	Sashoua (yellow card) 72'	Stadium: Pinatar Arena; Attendance: 0 Referee: David Gálvez Rascón

1 September 2020 Friendly	Mallorca	2–0	Castellón	San Pedro del Pinatar, Spain
20:00 CEST (UTC+2)	Alegría 24'; Dani Rodríguez (yellow card) 42'; Sastre 45+2'; Sedlar (yellow card) 78'; A. Sánchez (yellow card) 80'; Quintana (yellow card) 90+1'	Report		Stadium: Pinatar Arena; Attendance: 0 Referee: Jorge Díaz Escudero

5 September 2020 Friendly	Lugo	0–1	Mallorca	Lugo, Spain
17:00 CEST (UTC+2)	Quindimil (yellow card) 87'	Report	Bravo 45'	Stadium: O Ceao; Attendance: 0 Referee: Miguel Ferrol Muñiz

== Competitions ==
=== Overview ===
Competition	First match	Last match	Starting round	Final position	Record							
Competition	First match	Last match	Starting round	Final position	Pld	W	D	L	GF	GA	GD	Win %
Segunda División	13 September 2020	30 May 2021	Matchday 1	2nd	42	24	10	8	54	28	+26	57.14
Copa del Rey	16 December 2020	6 January 2021	First round	Second round	2	1	1	0	3	2	+1	50.00
Total					44	25	11	8	57	30	+27	56.82

Last updated: 30 May 2021
Source: Soccerway

=== Segunda División ===
==== League table ====
Pos	Team	Pld	W	D	L	GF	GA	GD	Pts	Promotion, qualification or relegation
1	Espanyol (C, P)	42	24	10	8	71	28	+43	82 (Note: Head-to-head points: Espanyol: 4, Mallorca: 1)	Promotion to La Liga
2	Mallorca (P)	42	24	10	8	54	28	+26	82	Promotion to La Liga
3	Leganés	42	21	10	11	51	32	+19	73 (Note: Head-to-head points: Leganés: 4, Almería: 1)	Qualification for promotion play-offs
4	Almería	42	21	10	11	61	40	+21	73	Qualification for promotion play-offs
5	Girona	42	20	11	11	47	36	+11	71	Qualification for promotion play-offs

Source: LaLiga
Rules for classification: 1) points; 2) head-to-head points; 3) head-to-head goal difference; 4) goal difference; 5) number of goals scored
(C) Champions; (P) Promoted

==== Results summary ====
Overall								Home						Away					
Pld	W	D	L	GF	GA	GD	Pts	W	D	L	GF	GA	GD	W	D	L	GF	GA	GD
42	24	10	8	54	28	+26	82	14	3	4	33	12	+21	10	7	4	21	16	+5

Last updated: 30 May 2021.
Source: La Liga

==== Results by round ====
Round	1	2	3	4	5	6	7	8	9	10	11	12	13	14	15	16	17	18	19	20	21	22	23	24	25	26	27	28	29	30	31	32	33	34	35	36	37	38	39	40	41	42
Ground	H	A	H	H	A	A	H	A	H	A	H	A	H	A	H	A	H	A	H	A	H	A	H	A	H	H	A	H	A	H	A	H	A	H	A	A	H	A	H	A	H	A
Result	L	D	W	W	W	D	D	W	W	D	W	W	D	W	W	W	W	W	L	D	L	W	W	W	L	W	W	W	L	D	L	W	D	W	L	L	W	D	W	W	W	D
Position	18	16	11	7	4	5	8	3	3	3	2	2	2	1	2	2	1	2	2	2	2	1	1	1	1	1	1	1	1	1	2	2	2	2	2	2	2	2	2	2	2	2

Updated to match(es) played on 30 May 2021. Source: La Liga
A = Away; H = Home; W = Win; D = Draw; L = Loss

==== Matches ====
The league fixtures were announced on 31 August 2020.

13 September 2020 1	Mallorca	0–1	Rayo Vallecano	Palma
16:00 CEST (UTC+2)	Valjent (yellow card) 11'	Report	Catena (yellow card) 9'; Santi (yellow card) 44'; Saveljich (yellow card) 45+3'; Isi 50'; Á. García (yellow card) 90+4'	Stadium: Visit Mallorca Stadium; Attendance: 0 (Note: The match was played behind closed doors due to the COVID-19 pandemic in Spain.); Referee: Luis Mario Milla Alvendiz

20 September 2020 2	Espanyol	0–0	Mallorca	Cornellà de Llobregat
16:00 CEST (UTC+2)	Valjent (yellow card) 41'; Baba (yellow card) 63'	Report	Mérida (yellow card) 26'; Roca (yellow card) 79' (yellow-red card) 84'	Stadium: RCDE Stadium; Attendance: 0 (Note: The match was played behind closed doors due to the COVID-19 pandemic in Spain.); Referee: Dámaso Arcediano Monescillo

27 September 2020 3	Mallorca	1–0	Sabadell	Palma
16:00 CEST (UTC+2)	Abdón (yellow card) 68'; Rodríguez 85'	Report	Cornud (yellow card) 74' (yellow-red card) 76'; Mackay (yellow card) 78'; V. García (yellow card) 90+3'	Stadium: Visit Mallorca Stadium; Attendance: 0 Referee: Álvaro Moreno Aragón

3 October 2020 4	Mallorca	2–0	Tenerife	Palma
18:15 CEST (UTC+2)	Valjent 20'; Baba (yellow card) 51'; Rodríguez 55' (pen.)	Report	Zarfino (yellow card) 14'; Wilson (yellow card) 90'	Stadium: Visit Mallorca Stadium; Attendance: 0 Referee: José Antonio López Toca

11 October 2020 5	Lugo	0–1	Mallorca	Lugo
16:00 CEST (UTC+2)	Carlos Pita (yellow card) 66' (yellow-red card) 90+5'; Torres (yellow card) 73' (yellow-red card) 77'; Luis Ruiz (yellow card) 76'; Valentín (yellow card) 81'	Report	Sevilla 56' (pen.); Cufré (yellow card) 61'; Febas (yellow card) 79'; Rodríguez (yellow card) 83'; Sedlar (yellow card) 88'	Stadium: Estadio Anxo Carro; Attendance: 0 Referee: David Gálvez Rascón

18 October 2020 6	Mirandés	0–0	Mallorca	Miranda de Ebro
18:15 CEST (UTC+2)	Jiménez (yellow card) 56'; Muñoz (yellow card) 86'	Report	Sastre (yellow card) 8' (yellow-red card) 75'; Oliván (yellow card) 18'; Amath (yellow card) 26'; Raíllo (yellow card) 49'	Stadium: Estadio Municipal de Anduva; Attendance: 0 Referee: Rafael Sánchez López

22 October 2020 7	Mallorca	0–0	Albacete	Palma
19:00 CEST (UTC+2)	Sedlar (yellow card) 32'; Cufré (yellow card) 45+1'; Amath (yellow card) 51'	Report	Álvaro Jiménez (yellow card) 32'; Arroyo (yellow card) 87'	Stadium: Visit Mallorca Stadium; Attendance: 0 Referee: Juan Pulido Santana

26 October 2020 8	Alcorcón	0–2	Mallorca	Alcorcón
18:00 CEST (UTC+2)	Sosa (yellow card) 30'	Report	Sánchez 18'; Cardona 22' (yellow card) 67'; Sastre (yellow card) 50'	Stadium: Estadio Municipal de Santo Domingo; Attendance: 0 Referee: Daniel Ocón Arráiz

29 October 2020 9	Mallorca	3–1	Málaga	Palma
19:00 CEST (UTC+2)	Amath 10'; Sevilla (yellow card) 25'; De Galarreta (yellow card) 40'; Raíllo 50'; Rodríguez 73'	Report	Luis Muñoz (yellow card) 58'; Chavarría 67'; José Matos (yellow card) 78'	Stadium: Visit Mallorca Stadium; Attendance: 0 Referee: Oliver De La Fuente

1 November 2020 10	Zaragoza	0–0	Mallorca	Zaragoza
16:00 CEST (UTC+2)	Javi Ros (yellow card) 54'; Bermejo (yellow card) 57'	Report	Baba (yellow card) 29'	Stadium: La Romareda; Attendance: 0 Referee: José López Toca

8 November 2020 11	Mallorca	3–0	Ponferradina	Palma
18:15 CEST (UTC+2)	Raíllo (yellow card) 5'; Rodríguez 21', 43', (yellow card) 53'; Mboula (yellow card) 34'; Sánchez 54'; Joan Sastre (yellow card) 88'	Report	Castellano (yellow card) 81'	Stadium: Visit Mallorca Stadium; Attendance: 0 Referee: Francisco Hernández Maeso

14 November 2020 12	Girona	0–1	Mallorca	Girona
18:30 CEST (UTC+2)	Aday (yellow card) 34'; Sáiz (yellow card) 54'; Gumbau (yellow card) 76'; Ramalho (red card) 86'; Sylla (yellow card) 90+5' (yellow-red card) 90+5'	Report	Sevilla 5'; Raíllo (yellow card) 61'; De Galarreta (yellow card) 71'; Russo (yellow card) 79'	Stadium: Estadi Montilivi; Attendance: 0 Referee: Jon González Esteban

22 November 2020 13	Mallorca	0–0	Sporting Gijón	Palma
16:00 CEST (UTC+2)	Sevilla (yellow card) 53'	Report		Stadium: Visit Mallorca Stadium; Attendance: 0 Referee: David Gálvez Rascón

25 November 2020 14	FC Cartagena	1–2	Mallorca	Cartagena
21:30 CEST (UTC+2)	José Jurado (yellow card) 13'; David (yellow card) 71' (red card) 78'; Harper (yellow card) 75'; Rhyner (yellow card) 83'; Zorrilla 90'; Gallar (yellow card) 90+3'	Report	Baba (yellow card) 12'; Rodríguez 69' (pen.); Junior 81' (pen.); Reina (yellow card) 90+2'	Stadium: Estadio Cartagonova; Attendance: 0 Referee: Rubén Ávalos Barrera

29 November 2020 15	Mallorca	4–0	UD Logroñés	Palma
18:15 CEST (UTC+2)	Sevilla 8'; Amath (yellow card) 34', (goal) 41'; Prats 69'; Romero 85'	Report	López (red card) 4'	Stadium: Visit Mallorca Stadium; Attendance: 0 Referee: Álvaro Moreno Aragón

3 December 2020 16	Almería	0–1	Mallorca	Almería
19:00 CEST (UTC+2)	Chumi (yellow card) 5'; Sadiq (yellow card) 21'; De la Hoz (yellow card) 25'; Centelles (yellow card) 51'; Corpas (yellow card) 90+6'	Report	Sánchez (yellow card) 36'; Baba (yellow card) 39'; De Galarreta (yellow card) 87'; Prats 90+1'	Stadium: Estadio de los Juegos Mediterráneos; Attendance: 0 Referee: Alejandro Muñiz Ruiz

7 December 2020 17	Mallorca	3–1	Castellón	Palma
21:00 CEST (UTC+2)	Prats 8' 55'; Sevilla 12'; Sedlar (yellow card) 72'	Report	Satrústegui 73' (yellow card) 86'	Stadium: Visit Mallorca Stadium; Attendance: 0 Referee: Rafael Sánchez López

12 December 2020 18	Leganés	0–1	Mallorca	Leganés
16:00 CEST (UTC+2)	Ibáñez (yellow card) 28' (yellow-red card) 39'	Report	Sánchez (yellow card) 19'; Amath 61'	Stadium: Estadio Municipal de Butarque; Attendance: 0 Referee: Gorka Sagués Oscoz

19 December 2020 19	Mallorca	2–3	Fuenlabrada	Palma
18:15 CEST (UTC+2)	Cufré 20' (yellow card) 25' (yellow-red card) 31'; Mboula (yellow card) 39'; Raíllo (yellow card) 45+5' (yellow-red card) 45+5'; Russo (yellow card) 48'; Prats 52'; De Galarreta (yellow card) 66'	Report	Sotillos (yellow card) 4'; Pulido 11'; Salvador 33'; Jano (yellow card) 56'; Damián 63'; Nteka (yellow card) 72'; Fuentes (yellow card) 89'; Valentín (yellow card) 90+5'	Stadium: Visit Mallorca Stadium; Attendance: 0 Referee: Javier Iglesias Villanueva

3 January 2021 20	Oviedo	2–2	Mallorca	Oviedo
21:00 CET (UTC+2)	Mier 44'; Arribas 68'	Report	Junior 15'; Joan Sastre 20'; Prats (yellow card) 73'; De Galarreta (yellow card) 82'	Stadium: Estadio Carlos Tartiere; Attendance: 0 Referee: Daniel Jesús Trujillo Suárez

10 January 2021 21	Mallorca	0–1	Las Palmas	Palma
16:00 CET (UTC+2)	Joan Sastre (yellow card) 57'; Valjent (yellow card) 61'; Diabate (yellow card) 88'	Report	Araujo 21'; Castellano (yellow card) 75'	Stadium: Visit Mallorca Stadium; Attendance: 0 Referee: Aitor Gorostegui Fernández Ortega

23 January 2021 22	Rayo Vallecano	1–3	Mallorca	Madrid
16:00 CET (UTC+2)	Advíncula (yellow card) 18' (goal) 41'; Isi (yellow card) 28'; Suárez (yellow card) 38'	Report	Amath 3'; Prats 13'; Sevilla 19'; Russo (yellow card) 42'; De Galarreta (yellow card) 71'; Rodríguez (yellow card) 78'	Stadium: Estadio de Vallecas; Attendance: 0 Referee: Eduardo Prieto Iglesias

30 January 2021 23	Mallorca	1–0	Girona	Palma
20:30 CET (UTC+2)	Sánchez (yellow card) 25'; Oliván (yellow card) 52'; Valjent (yellow card) 75'; Amath 90+2'	Report	Monchu (yellow card) 82'	Stadium: Visit Mallorca Stadium; Attendance: 0 Referee: Alejandro Muñíz Ruiz

5 February 2021 24	Albacete	0–1	Mallorca	Albacete
21:00 CET (UTC+2)	Gorosito (yellow card) 12' (yellow-red card) 37'; Sepp Mvondo (yellow card) 71'	Report	Prats (yellow card) 44'; De Galarreta (yellow card) 45'; Amath 59'; Russo (yellow card) 90+3'	Stadium: Estadio Carlos Belmonte; Attendance: 0 Referee: Álvaro Moreno Aragón

14 February 2021 25	Mallorca	1–2	Espanyol	Palma
14:00 CET (UTC+1)	De Galarreta (yellow card) 32'; Amath 52'; Oliván (yellow card) 80'	Report	Puado 33'; Dimata 73'	Stadium: Visit Mallorca Stadium; Attendance: 0 Referee: Dámaso Arcediano Monescillo

21 February 2021 26	Mallorca	2–0	Almería	Palma
16:00 CET (UTC+1)	De Galarreta (yellow card) 31'; Prats 44' (pen.); Sevilla 69', (yellow card) 80'; Oliván (yellow card) 90+2'; Baba (yellow card) 90+4'	Report	Maraš (yellow card) 43'; Makaridze (yellow card) 44'; Balliu (yellow card) 45+1'; Costa (yellow card) 50'; Villar (yellow card) 63'	Stadium: Visit Mallorca Stadium; Attendance: 0 Referee: Miguel Ángel Ortiz Arias

27 February 2021 27	UD Logroñés	0–1	Mallorca	Logroño
21:00 CET (UTC+1)	Martínez (yellow card) 56'	Report	Sánchez 19'	Stadium: Estadio Las Gaunas; Attendance: 0 Referee: David Gálvez Rascón

7 March 2021 28	Mallorca	2–1	FC Cartagena	Palma
18:15 CET (UTC+1)	Baba (yellow card) 24'; Rodríguez (yellow card) 43'; Amath 45+1'; Raíllo (yellow card) 71'; Giménez 81' (pen.)	Report	Aburjania (yellow card) 33'; Forniés 64'; Azeez (yellow card) 73'; Andújar (yellow card) 80'; Carrasquilla (yellow card) 90+1'	Stadium: Visit Mallorca Stadium; Attendance: 0 Referee: Rubén Ávalos Barrera

14 March 2021 29	Sporting Gijón	2–0	Mallorca	Gijón
16:00 CET (UTC+1)	Đurđević 28' (pen.), 86'; Pérez (yellow card) 90+2'; Babin (yellow card) 90+4'	Report	Sánchez (yellow card) 27'; Cufré (yellow card) 90+2'	Stadium: El Molinón; Attendance: 0 Referee: Alejandro Muñiz Ruiz

20 March 2021 30	Mallorca	0–0	Oviedo	Palma
18:15 CET (UTC+1)	Mollejo (yellow card) 31'; Valjent (yellow card) 90+1'	Report	Tejera (yellow card) 29'	Stadium: Visit Mallorca Stadium; Attendance: 0 Referee: Gorka Sagués Oscoz

29 March 2021 31	Fuenlabrada	4–1	Mallorca	Fuenlabrada
21:00 CEST (UTC+2)	Pinchi 13', 38'; Garcés (yellow card) 17'; Nteka 41' (pen.); Ciss 73', (yellow card) 90+2'; Cristóbal (yellow card) 75'	Report	Mboula 56'; Cufré (yellow card) 71'	Stadium: Fernando Torres; Attendance: 0 Referee: Dámaso Arcediano Monescillo

1 April 2021 32	Mallorca	1–0	Leganés	Palma
19:00 CEST (UTC+2)	Raíllo 26', (yellow card) 62'; Baba (yellow card) 39'; Oliván (yellow card) 90+4'	Report	Palencia (yellow card) 24'; Pardo (yellow card) 45+1'; Omeruo (yellow card) 81'	Stadium: Visit Mallorca Stadium; Attendance: 0 Referee: Eduardo Prieto Iglesias

4 April 2021 33	Las Palmas	1–1	Mallorca	Las Palmas
20:30 CEST (UTC+2)	Araujo 47'	Report	Amath 14'; Murilo (yellow card) 31'; Sedlar (yellow card) 45'; Cufré (yellow card) 76'	Stadium: Gran Canaria; Attendance: 0 Referee: Jon Ander González Esteban

11 April 2021 34	Mallorca	2–0	Lugo	Palma
18:15 CEST (UTC+2)	Rodríguez 1'; Mboula (yellow card) 39'; Sedlar (yellow card) 45+1'; Mollejo 63'; Amath (yellow card) 65'	Report	Juanpe (yellow card) 51'; Appiah (yellow card) 90+1'	Stadium: Visit Mallorca Stadium; Attendance: 0 Referee: Daniel Ocón Arráiz

17 April 2021 35	Castellón	1–0	Mallorca	Castellón de la Plana
16:00 CEST (UTC+2)	Juanto 24'; Molina (yellow card) 26'; Lapeña (yellow card) 33'; Ledes (yellow card) 86'; García (yellow card) 90+4'	Report	Valjent (yellow card) 42'; Sevilla (yellow card) 71'; Cufré (yellow card) 78'; Raíllo (yellow card) 90+3'	Stadium: Nou Estadi Castàlia; Attendance: 0 Referee: Luis Mario Milla Alvendiz

26 April 2021 36	Sabadell	1–0	Mallorca	Sabadell
21:00 CEST (UTC+2)	Sánchez 13'	Report	Valjent (yellow card) 35'; Sastre (yellow card) 39'; Rodríguez (yellow card) 88'	Stadium: Estadi de la Nova Creu Alta; Attendance: 0 Referee: Iosu Galech Apezteguía

1 May 2021 37	Mallorca	2–1	Mirandés	Palma
18:15 CEST (UTC+2)	Abdón 44'; Vivian 51' (o.g.); Reina (yellow card) 83'; Rodríguez (yellow card) 84'; Junior (yellow card) 90+2'	Report	Berrocal (yellow card) 22'; Vivian (yellow card) 42'; Gómez (yellow card) 45'; Djouahra 64'	Stadium: Visit Mallorca Stadium; Attendance: 0 Referee: José Antonio López Toca

8 May 2021 38	Málaga	1–1	Mallorca	Málaga
21:00 CEST (UTC+2)	Lombán 10' (pen.); Cristo (yellow card) 51'; Juande (yellow card) 61'; Rodríguez (yellow card) 64'	Report	Junior 29'; Sastre (yellow card) 65'; Mboula (yellow card) 79'; Raíllo (yellow card) 90+2'; Oliván (yellow card) 90+4'	Stadium: La Rosaleda; Attendance: 0 Referee: Francisco José Hernández Maeso

16 May 2021 39	Mallorca	2–0	Alcorcón	Palma
21:30 CEST (UTC+2)	Rodríguez (yellow card) 36'; Abdón 43' (pen.), (yellow card) 46'; Sedlar (yellow card) 50'; Sevilla 54'	Report	Nwakali (yellow card) 17'; León (yellow card) 27'; Aguilera (yellow card) 43'	Stadium: Visit Mallorca Stadium; Attendance: 0 Referee: Dámaso Arcediano Monescillo

19 May 2021 40	Tenerife	0–1	Mallorca	Santa Cruz de Tenerife
21:30 CEST (UTC+2)	Kakabadze (yellow card) 12'; Alberto (yellow card) 19'; Vada (yellow card) 67'; Muñoz (yellow card) 79'; Shashoua (yellow card) 90+1'	Report	Mboula (yellow card) 39'; Mollejo 43'; Baba (yellow card) 66'	Stadium: Heliodoro Rodríguez López; Attendance: 0 Referee: Rubén Ávalos Barrera

23 May 2021 41	Mallorca	2–1	Zaragoza	Palma
18:15 CEST (UTC+2)	Rodríguez (yellow card) 22', (goal) 68'; Sevilla (yellow card) 58'; Junior 89'	Report	Zanimacchia 23' (pen.); Sanabria (yellow card) 32'; Serrano (yellow card) 34'	Stadium: Visit Mallorca Stadium; Attendance: 0 Referee: David Gálvez Rascón

30 May 2021 42	Ponferradina	2–2	Mallorca	Ponferrada
21:00 CEST (UTC+2)	Sielva 43' (pen.); Caro (red card) 85'; Curro 87'	Report	Mollejo (yellow card) 8'; Raíllo (yellow card) 40'; Cardona 45+2'; Febas (yellow card) 65'; Abdón 75'	Stadium: El Toralín; Attendance: 0 Referee: Álvaro Moreno Aragón

=== Copa del Rey ===
16 December 2020 First round	Guijuelo	0–1	Mallorca	Guijuelo
19:30 CET (UTC+1)	Rubén (yellow card) 72'	Report	Gámez (yellow card) 52'; Baba (yellow card) 54'; Prats 73'	Stadium: Estadio Municipal de Guijuelo; Referee: Francisco Hernández Maeso

6 January 2021 Second round	Fuenlabrada	2–2 (a.e.t.) (7–6 p)	Mallorca	Fuenlabrada
21:00 CET (UTC+1)	Diéguez 55'; Gonzalez 100' (o.g.)	Report	Trajkovski 11'; Abdón 115'	Stadium: Fernando Torres; Referee: Luis Mario Milla Alvendiz
	Penalties
	Mula (penalty scored); Kanté (penalty scored); Nteka (penalty scored); Franchu (penalty missed); Diéguez (penalty scored); Ciss (penalty scored); Sotillos (penalty scored); Glauder (penalty scored)		(penalty scored) Sevilla; (penalty scored) Junior; (penalty scored) Murilo; (penalty scored) Abdón; (penalty missed) Cufré; (penalty scored) Gámez; (penalty scored) Russo; (penalty missed) Sánchez

== Squad statistics ==
=== Appearances ===
Last updated on 3 October 2020.

No.	Pos.	Nat.	Name	Segunda División		Copa del Rey		Total	
No.	Pos.	Nat.	Name	Apps	Starts	Apps	Starts	Apps	Starts
Goalkeepers
1	GK	(Spain)	Manolo Reina	4	4	0	0	4	4
13	GK	(Spain)	Miquel Parera	0	0	0	0	0	0
Defenders
2	DF	(Spain)	Joan Sastre	4	4	0	0	4	4
3	DF	(Spain)	Brian Oliván	4	3	0	0	4	3
5	DF	(Argentina)	Franco Russo	0	0	0	0	0	0
15	DF	(Spain)	Fran Gámez	0	0	0	0	0	0
19	DF	(Argentina)	Braian Cufré	1	0	0	0	1	0
20	DF	(Serbia)	Aleksandar Sedlar	0	0	0	0	0	0
21	DF	(Spain)	Antonio Raíllo	4	4	0	0	4	4
24	DF	(Slovakia)	Martin Valjent	4	4	0	0	4	4
26	DF	(Spain)	Carlos Quintana	0	0	0	0	0	0
27	DF	(Spain)	Rafel Obrador	0	0	0	0	0	0
28	DF	(Spain)	Iván Bravo	1	1	0	0	1	1
Midfielders
4	MF	(Spain)	R. de Galarreta	1	0	0	0	1	0
6	MF	(Spain)	Aleix Febas	3	2	0	0	3	2
8	MF	(Spain)	Salva Sevilla	4	3	0	0	4	3
12	MF	(Ghana)	Iddrisu Baba	4	4	0	0	4	4
14	MF	(Spain)	Dani Rodríguez	4	4	0	0	4	4
18	MF	(Spain)	Antonio Sánchez	2	0	0	0	2	0
23	MF	(Spain)	Stoichkov	3	1	0	0	3	1
29	MF	(Argentina)	Luka Romero	2	0	0	0	2	0
Forwards
7	FW	(Spain)	Álex Alegría	4	1	0	0	4	1
9	FW	(Spain)	Abdón Prats	3	3	0	0	3	3
10	FW	(Brazil)	Murilo de Souza	2	1	0	0	2	1
11	FW	(Ivory Coast)	Lago Junior	4	4	0	0	4	4
16	FW	(Spain)	Jordi Mboula	2	1	0	0	2	1
17	FW	(North Macedonia)	Aleksandar Trajkovski	1	0	0	0	1	0
22	FW	(Croatia)	Ante Budimir	1	0	0	0	1	0
Players who have made an appearance this season but have left the club

=== Goalscorers ===
As of match played 3 October 2020

Rank	Pos.	No.	Player	Segunda División	Copa del Rey	Total
1	MF	14	(Spain) Dani Rodríguez	2	0	2
2	MF	24	(Slovakia) Martin Valjent	1	0	1
Own Goals				0	0	0
Total				3	0	3

=== Assists ===
As of match played 3 October 2020

Rank	Pos.	No.	Player	Segunda División	Copa del Rey	Total
1	MF	23	(Spain) Stoichkov	1	0	1
1	MF	3	(Spain) Brian Oliván	1	0	1
Total				2	0	2

=== Clean sheets ===
As of match played 3 October 2020

Rank	No.	Player	Segunda División	Copa del Rey	Total
1	1	(Spain) Manolo Reina	3	0	3
2	13	(Spain) Miquel Parera	0	0	0
Total			3	0	3

=== Disciplinary record ===
As of match played 3 October 2020.

No.	Pos.	Nat.	Name	Segunda División		Copa del Rey		Total	
No.	Pos.	Nat.	Name	Yellow card	Red card	Yellow card	Red card	Yellow card	Red card
Goalkeepers
1	GK	(Spain)	Manolo Reina	0	0	0	0	0	0
13	GK	(Spain)	Miquel Parera	0	0	0	0	0	0
Defenders
2	DF	(Spain)	Joan Sastre	0	0	0	0	0	0
3	DF	(Spain)	Brian Oliván	0	0	0	0	0	0
5	DF	(Argentina)	Franco Russo	0	0	0	0	0	0
15	DF	(Spain)	Fran Gámez	0	0	0	0	0	0
19	DF	(Argentina)	Braian Cufré	0	0	0	0	0	0
20	DF	(Serbia)	Aleksandar Sedlar	0	0	0	0	0	0
21	DF	(Spain)	Antonio Raíllo	0	0	0	0	0	0
24	DF	(Slovakia)	Martin Valjent	2	0	0	0	2	0
26	DF	(Spain)	Carlos Quintana	0	0	0	0	0	0
27	DF	(Spain)	Rafel Obrador	0	0	0	0	0	0
28	DF	(Spain)	Iván Bravo	0	0	0	0	0	0
Midfielders
4	MF	(Spain)	R. de Galarreta	0	0	0	0	0	0
6	MF	(Spain)	Aleix Febas	0	0	0	0	0	0
8	MF	(Spain)	Salva Sevilla	0	0	0	0	0	0
12	MF	(Ghana)	Iddrisu Baba	2	0	0	0	2	0
14	MF	(Spain)	Dani Rodríguez	0	0	0	0	0	0
18	MF	(Spain)	Antonio Sánchez	0	0	0	0	0	0
23	MF	(Spain)	Stoichkov	0	0	0	0	0	0
29	MF	(Argentina)	Luka Romero	0	0	0	0	0	0
Forwards
7	FW	(Spain)	Álex Alegría	0	0	0	0	0	0
9	FW	(Spain)	Abdón Prats	1	0	0	0	1	0
11	FW	(Ivory Coast)	Lago Junior	0	0	0	0	0	0
16	FW	(Spain)	Jordi Mboula	0	0	0	0	0	0
17	FW	(North Macedonia)	Aleksandar Trajkovski	0	0	0	0	0	0
22	FW	(Croatia)	Ante Budimir	0	0	0	0	0	0
