= Leo Román =

Spanish footballer

Personal information
- Full name: Leonardo Román Riquelme
- Date of birth: 6 July 2000 (age 26)
- Place of birth: Ibiza, Spain
- Height: 1.89 m (6 ft 2 in)
- Position: Goalkeeper

Team information
- Current team: Deportivo A Coruña
- Number: 13

Youth career
- Atlético Isleño
- Sant Rafel
- Penya Blanc-i-Blava
- 2017–2018: Peña Deportiva

Senior career*
Years	Team	Apps	(Gls)
2018–2020	Peña Deportiva	6	(0)
2018–2019	→ Sant Rafel (loan)	14	(0)
2020–2022	Mallorca B	35	(0)
2021–2026	Mallorca	43	(0)
2023–2024	→ Oviedo (loan)	42	(0)
2026–	Deportivo A Coruña	0	(0)

International career^{‡}
2022–2023	Spain U21	2	(0)
2026–	Spain	1	(0)
Medal record
Representing Spain
UEFA European Under-21 Championship
Runner-up	2023 Georgia–Romania	Team
- * Club domestic league appearances and goals as of 23 May 2026 ‡ National team caps and goals as of 4 June 2026

Leonardo Román Riquelme (born 6 July 2000) is a Spanish professional footballer who plays as a goalkeeper for Deportivo de A Coruña and the Spain national team.

== Club career ==
=== Early career ===
Román was born in Ibiza, Balearic Islands, and represented UD Atlético Isleño, CF Sant Rafel and Atlètic Penya Blanc-i-Blava before joining SCR Peña Deportiva's youth setup in 2017. On 31 August 2018, after finishing his formation, he returned to Sant Rafel on loan for the season, being assigned to the main squad in the Tercera División.

Román made his senior debut on 3 November 2018, starting in a 1–2 away loss against UD Poblense. He returned to Peña in the following June, after playing 14 matches, and was assigned to the main squad in the Segunda División B.

=== Mallorca ===
On 6 August 2020, Román signed a four-year contract with RCD Mallorca and was initially assigned to the reserves also in the fourth division. He made his first-team debut on 16 December of the following year, starting in a 6–0 away routing of UD Llanera in the season's Copa del Rey.

Román played his first match for Mallorca against a professional side on 5 January 2022, as he played the full 90 minutes in a 2–1 win at SD Eibar, also in the national cup. He made his La Liga debut three days later, starting in a 0–2 away loss against Levante UD.

On 12 July 2022, Román renewed his contract with the Bermellones until 2026. On 28 June 2023, he was loaned to second division side Real Oviedo for the season.

After being an undisputed starter, Román returned to Mallorca in July 2024, but was mainly a backup to Dominik Greif. On 16 July 2025, he renewed his contract until 2030, and subsequently became a first-choice during the campaign, which ended in relegation.

=== Deportivo A Coruña ===
On 3 July 2026, Román signed a five-year contract with Deportivo de A Coruña, newly-promoted to the top tier, after the club triggered his release clause.

== International career ==
In May 2026, Román was included in Spain's pre-list for the 2026 FIFA World Cup, but did not make the final cut. He did make his full international debut on 4 June of that year, coming off the bench for Joan Garcia in the 73rd minute of a 1–1 friendly draw against Iraq at the Riazor stadium; by doing so, he became the first player born in Ibiza to play for the national team.

== Personal life ==
Román's father Vicente was also a footballer and a goalkeeper who later became a manager, while his older brother Alejandro also plays in the same position. His father also represented Peña Deportiva and managed both his sons at Sant Rafel.

== Career statistics ==
=== Club ===
As of match played 16 October 2026

Appearances and goals by club, season and competition
Club	Season	League			National cup		Other		Total	
Club	Season	Division	Apps	Goals	Apps	Goals	Apps	Goals	Apps	Goals
Peña Deportiva	2017–18	Segunda División B	0	0	0	0	—		0	0
Peña Deportiva	2019–20	Segunda División B	6	0	1	0	—		7	0
Peña Deportiva	Total		6	0	1	0	—		7	0
Sant Rafel (loan)	2018–19	Tercera División	14	0	0	0	—		14	0
Mallorca B	2020–21	Tercera División	22	0	—		3	0	25	0
Mallorca B	2021–22	Tercera División	10	0	—		—		10	0
Mallorca B	Total		32	0	—		3	0	35	0
Mallorca	2020–21	Segunda División	0	0	0	0	—		0	0
Mallorca	2021–22	La Liga	2	0	3	0	—		5	0
Mallorca	2022–23	La Liga	1	0	1	0	—		2	0
Mallorca	2024–25	La Liga	7	0	1	0	—		8	0
Mallorca	2025–26	La Liga	33	0	0	0	—		33	0
Mallorca	Total		43	0	5	0	—		48	0
Oviedo (loan)	2023–24	Segunda División	42	0	0	0	4	0	46	0
Deportivo A Coruña	2026–27	La Liga	9	0	0	0	—		9	0
Career total			146	0	6	0	7	0	159	0

=== International ===
As of match played 4 June 2026

Appearances and goals by national team and year
National team	Year	Apps	Goals
Spain	2026	1	0
Total		1	0
