= 2024–25 RCD Mallorca season =

RCD Mallorca
2024–25 season
- President: Andy Kohlberg
- Head coach: Jagoba Arrasate
- Stadium: Estadi Mallorca Son Moix
- La Liga: 10th
- Copa del Rey: Round of 32
- Supercopa de España: Semi-finals
- Top goalscorer: League: Cyle Larin; Vedat Muriqi (7 each); All: Cyle Larin; Vedat Muriqi (7 each)
- Highest home attendance: 23,010 vs Real Madrid
- Average home league attendance: 18,502
- Biggest defeat: Mallorca 1–5 Barcelona
Home colours	Away colours	Third colours

The 2024–25 season was the 109th season in the history of Real Club Deportivo Mallorca, and the club's fourth consecutive season in La Liga. In addition to the domestic league, the club participated in the Copa del Rey and the Supercopa de España.

On 10 June 2024, Jagoba Arrasate was announced as the team's manager for three seasons.

== Players ==
=== First-team squad ===
As of 17 August 2024

Note: Flags indicate national team as defined under FIFA eligibility rules; some limited exceptions apply. Players may hold more than one non-FIFA nationality.

No.	Pos.	Nation	Player
1	GK	SVK	Dominik Greif
2	DF	ESP	Mateu Morey
3	DF	ESP	Toni Lato
4	DF	BEL	Siebe Van der Heyden
5	MF	GEQ	Omar Mascarell
6	DF	ESP	José Manuel Copete
7	FW	KOS	Vedat Muriqi
8	MF	ESP	Manu Morlanes
9	FW	ESP	Abdón Prats
10	MF	ESP	Sergi Darder
11	FW	JPN	Takuma Asano
12	MF	POR	Samú Costa

No.	Pos.	Nation	Player
13	GK	ESP	Leo Román
14	MF	ESP	Dani Rodríguez (vice-captain)
17	FW	CAN	Cyle Larin
18	MF	ESP	Antonio Sánchez
19	FW	ESP	Javi Llabrés
21	DF	ESP	Antonio Raíllo (captain)
22	DF	COL	Johan Mojica
23	DF	ESP	Pablo Maffeo
24	DF	SVK	Martin Valjent (3rd captain)
25	GK	ESP	Iván Cuéllar
33	MF	COL	Daniel Luna

== Transfers ==
=== In ===
Pos.	Player	Transferred from	Fee	Date	Source
MF	(Ghana) Iddrisu Baba	(Spain) Almería	Loan return	30 June 2024	
DF	(Spain) Josep Gayà	(Spain) Amorebieta	Loan return	30 June 2024	
GK	(Spain) Leo Román	(Spain) Oviedo	Loan return	30 June 2024	
DF	(Spain) Mateu Morey	(Germany) Borussia Dortmund	Free	5 July 2024	
DF	(Colombia) Johan Mojica	(Spain) Villarreal	€1,000,000	23 July 2024	

=== Out ===
Pos.	Player	Transferred to	Fee	Date	Source
DF	(Spain) Nacho Vidal	(Spain) Osasuna	Loan return	30 June 2024	
MF	(Serbia) Nemanja Radonjić	(Italy) Torino	Loan return	30 June 2024	
DF	(Spain) Josep Gayà		Contract terminated	1 July 2024	
FW	(Senegal) Amath Ndiaye	(Spain) Valladolid	€2,000,000	1 July 2024	
MF	(Ghana) Iddrisu Baba	(Spain) Almería	Undisclosed	4 July 2024	
GK	(Serbia) Predrag Rajković	(Saudi Arabia) Al-Ittihad	€11,000,0000	5 August 2024	

== Friendlies ==
=== Pre-season ===
21 July 2024 Friendly	Crewe Alexandra	1–3	Mallorca	England
	Sant 78'	Report	Lato 55'; Domènech 58'; Muriqi 90'

26 July 2024 Friendly	Barnsley	0–1	Mallorca	Loughborough, England
12:00 BST (UTC+1)				Stadium: Loughborough University Football Stadium

27 July 2024 Friendly	West Bromwich Albion	0–1	Mallorca	Walsall, England
13:00 BST (UTC+1)				Stadium: West Bromwich Albion Training Ground

31 July 2024 Friendly	Poblense	0–5	Mallorca	Son Bibiloni
20:00				Stadium: Campo Tomeu Serra

3 August 2024 Friendly	Burgos	0–2	Mallorca
11:00

3 August 2024 Friendly	Mirandés	Cancelled	Mallorca
19:00 CEST (UTC+2)

10 August 2024 Trofeu Ciutat de Palma	Mallorca	1–1 (5–6 p)	Bologna	Palma
20:30 CEST (UTC+2)	Asano 9'	Report	Castro 25'	Stadium: Estadi Mallorca Son Moix; Referee: López García (Spain)
	Penalties
	Muriqi (penalty missed); Sánchez (penalty scored); Luna (penalty scored); Rodríguez (penalty scored); Mascarell (penalty scored); Maffeo (penalty scored); Lato (penalty missed)		(penalty scored) Orsolini; (penalty scored) Dallinga; (penalty scored) Posch; (penalty missed) Freuler; (penalty scored) Fabbian; (penalty scored) Beukema; (penalty scored) Corazza

== Competitions ==
=== Overall record ===
Competition	First match	Last match	Starting round	Final position	Record							
Competition	First match	Last match	Starting round	Final position	Pld	W	D	L	GF	GA	GD	Win %
La Liga	18 August 2024	23–25 May 2025	Matchday 1		33	12	8	13	31	38	−7	36.36
Copa del Rey	3 January 2025		Round of 32	Round of 32	1	0	0	1	0	3	−3	0.00
Supercopa de España	9 January 2025		Semi-finals	Semi-finals	1	0	0	1	0	3	−3	0.00
Total					35	12	8	15	31	44	−13	34.29

Last updated: 23 April 2025
Source: Soccerway

=== La Liga ===
==== League table ====
Pos	Team	Pld	W	D	L	GF	GA	GD	Pts	Qualification or relegation
8	Rayo Vallecano	38	13	13	12	41	45	−4	52 (Note: Rayo Vallecano finished ahead of Osasuna on head-to-head points: Rayo Vallecano 3–1 Osasuna, Osasuna 1–1 Rayo Vallecano.)	Qualification for the Conference League play-off round
9	Osasuna	38	12	16	10	48	52	−4	52	
10	Mallorca	38	13	9	16	35	44	−9	48	
11	Real Sociedad	38	13	7	18	35	46	−11	46 (Note: Real Sociedad finished ahead of Valencia on head-to-head goal difference: Real Sociedad 3–0 Valencia, Valencia 1–0 Real Sociedad.)	
12	Valencia	38	11	13	14	44	54	−10	46	

Source: LaLiga EA Sports
Rules for classification: 1) Points; 2) Head-to-head points; 3) Head-to-head goal difference; 4) Goal difference; 5) Goals scored; 6) Fair-play points
(Note: Head-to-head record is used only after all the matches between the teams in question have been played)

==== Results summary ====
Overall								Home						Away					
Pld	W	D	L	GF	GA	GD	Pts	W	D	L	GF	GA	GD	W	D	L	GF	GA	GD
33	12	8	13	31	38	−7	44	6	6	4	16	16	0	6	2	9	15	22	−7

Last updated: 23 April 2025.
Source: La Liga

==== Results by round ====
Round	1	2	3	4	5	6	7	8	9	10	11	12	13	14	15	16	17	18	19	20	21	22	23	24	25	26	27	28	29	30	31	32	33	34
Ground	H	A	H	A	H	A	H	A	A	H	H	A	H	A	H	A	H	A	H	A	H	A	H	H	A	H	A	H	A	H	A	H	A	
Result	D	L	D	W	L	W	W	W	L	W	D	L	L	W	W	L	W	W	L	L	L	L	D	W	D	D	D	W	L	L	W	D	L	
Position	12	16	18	10	13	11	6	6	7	6	7	8	9	8	6	7	6	6	6	6	6	9	10	7	8	8	7	7	9	10	8	7	9	

Updated to match(es) played on 23 April 2025. Source: La Liga
A = Away; H = Home; W = Win; D = Draw; L = Loss

==== Matches ====
The league schedule was released on 18 June 2024.

18 August 2024 1	Mallorca	1–1	Real Madrid	Palma
21:30	Maffeo (yellow card) 45+3'; Muriqi 53'	Report	Rodrygo 13'; Mendy (red card) 90+7'	Stadium: Estadi Mallorca Son Moix; Attendance: 23,010; Referee: César Soto Grado

24 August 2024 2	Osasuna	1–0	Mallorca	Pamplona
17:00	García 55'; Areso (yellow card) 75'; Herrera (yellow card) 77'	Report	Larin (yellow card) 88'	Stadium: El Sadar; Attendance: 19,900; Referee: Adrián Cordero Vega

27 August 2024 3	Mallorca	0–0	Sevilla	Palma
19:00		Report	Sow (yellow card) 88'; Saúl (red card) 89'	Stadium: Estadi Mallorca Son Moix; Attendance: 20,470; Referee: Alejandro Muñiz Ruiz

31 August 2024 4	Leganés	0–1	Mallorca	Leganés
21:30	Neyou (yellow card) 89'	Report	Rodríguez 43'; Morlanes (yellow card) 77'; Mascarell (yellow card) 85'; Navarro (yellow card) 90+2'	Stadium: Estadio Municipal de Butarque; Attendance: 10,482; Referee: Mario Melero López

14 September 2024 5	Mallorca	1–2	Villarreal	Palma
14:00	Costa (yellow card) 25'; Valjent (yellow card) 37'; Albiol 57' (o.g.); Lato (red card) 69'; Valery (yellow card) 90+4'	Report	Costa 27'; Cardona (yellow card) 33'; Barry (yellow card) 47'; Comesaña (yellow card) 83'; Pérez 90+4'	Stadium: Estadi Mallorca Son Moix; Attendance: 18,303; Referee: Ricardo de Burgos Bengoetxea

17 September 2024 7	Mallorca	1–0	Real Sociedad	Palma
19:00	Abdón 36' (pen.), (yellow card) 60'	Report	Turrientes (yellow card) 54'	Stadium: Estadi Mallorca Son Moix; Attendance: 17,132; Referee: Adrián Cordero Vega
Note: The date of the match was moved forward due to its conflict with Real Sociedad's participation in the Europa League.

23 September 2024 6	Real Betis	1–2	Mallorca	Seville
21:00	Lo Celso 7', (yellow card) 35'; Bellerín (yellow card) 21'; Ávila (yellow card) 34'	Report	Rodríguez 8', (yellow card) 65'; Copete (yellow card) 81'; Valery 90+3'; Morey (yellow card) 90+5'	Stadium: Benito Villamarín; Attendance: 47,017; Referee: Víctor García Verdura

29 September 2024 8	Valladolid	1–2	Mallorca	Valladolid
21:00	Pérez (yellow card) 21'; Juma Bah (yellow card) 76'; Cömert (yellow card) 85'; Sánchez 90+4'	Report	Morlanes (yellow card) 26'; Larin 59'; Costa (yellow card) 68'; Fernández 83'	Stadium: Estadio José Zorrilla; Attendance: 20,338; Referee: José Luis Munuera Montero

5 October 2024 9	Espanyol	2–1	Mallorca	Cornellà de Llobregat
14:00	Kumbulla 18'; Carreras 47'; Milla (yellow card) 66'	Report	Mojica (yellow card) 58'; Costa (yellow card) 62'; Chiquinho (yellow card) 65'; Raíllo 68'; Mascarell (yellow card) 78'; Abdón (yellow card) 90'	Stadium: Stage Front Stadium; Attendance: 24,434; Referee: Francisco Hernández

20 October 2024 10	Mallorca	1–0	Rayo Vallecano	Palma
14:00	Morlanes (yellow card) 38'; Muriqi 75'	Report	Mumin (yellow card) 37'	Stadium: Estadi Mallorca Son Moix; Attendance: 18,316; Referee: Javier Alberola

28 October 2024 11	Mallorca	0–0	Athletic Bilbao	Palma
21:00	Costa (yellow card) 10' (yellow-red card) 23'; Mojica (yellow card) 23'; Larin (yellow card) 25'; Muriqi (yellow card) 37'	Report	Paredes (yellow card) 17'	Stadium: Estadi Mallorca Son Moix; Attendance: 19,797; Referee: Juan Martínez Munuera

1 November 2024 12	Alavés	1–0	Mallorca	Vitoria-Gasteiz
21:00	García (yellow card) 10'; Pica (yellow card) 35'; Abqar (yellow card) 44'; Guridi 76'	Report	Chiquinho (yellow card) 53'; Copete (yellow card) 90+3'	Stadium: Mendizorrotza Stadium; Attendance: 17,212; Referee: Pablo González Fuertes

10 November 2024 13	Mallorca	0–1	Atlético Madrid	Palma
16:45 CET (UTC+1)	Costa (yellow card) 57'	Report	Lenglet (yellow card) 10'; Alvarez 61'; Mandava (yellow card) 83'; Correa (yellow card) 90+4'	Stadium: Estadi Mallorca Son Moix; Attendance: 19,500; Referee: José María Sánchez Martínez

24 November 2024 14	Las Palmas	2–3	Mallorca	Las Palmas
06:30WET (UTC±0)	Essugo (yellow card) 64', (goal) 77'; Fábio Silva 83'; Mata (yellow card) 88'; Moleiro (yellow card) 90+2'; Álex Suárez (yellow card) 90+2'	Report	Morlanes (yellow card) 43'; Dani Rodríguez 46'; Navarro 56'; Raíllo (yellow card) 68'; Muriqi (red card) 88'; Mojica 90+1'	Stadium: Estadio Gran Canaria; Attendance: 22,940; Referee: Alejandro Muñiz Ruiz

1 December 2024 15	Mallorca	2–1	Valencia	Palma
16:00	Larin 45+3'; Valjent (yellow card) 71'; Abdón 81'	Report	Rioja 32' (pen.), (yellow card) 62'	Stadium: Estadi Mallorca Son Moix; Attendance: 17,717; Referee: Alejandro Quintero González

4 December 2024 19	Mallorca	1–5	Barcelona	Palma
19:00 CET (UTC+1)	Maffeo (yellow card) 34'; Muriqi 43'; Raíllo (yellow card) 51'; Mojica (yellow card) 55'; Abdón (yellow card) 58'	Report	Cubarsí (yellow card) 3'; Torres 12'; Casadó (yellow card) 23'; Pedri (yellow card) 60'; Raphinha 56' (pen.), 74'; De Jong 79'; Víctor 84'	Stadium: Estadi Mallorca Son Moix; Attendance: 22,352; Referee: Jesús Gil Manzano

8 December 2024 16	Celta Vigo	2–0	Mallorca	Vigo
21:00	Álvarez 32'; Javi Rodríguez (yellow card) 44'; Aspas 82'	Report	Antonio Raíllo (red card) 78'	Stadium: Balaídos; Attendance: 22,861; Referee: Ricardo De Burgos Bengoetxea

14 December 2024 17	Mallorca	2–1	Girona	Palma
16:15 CET (UTC+1)	Larin 20', 51'; Muriqi (red card) 32'; Morlanes (yellow card) 32'; Mascarell (yellow card) 42'; Copete (yellow card) 42'; Valjent (yellow card) 66'; Abdón (yellow card) 78'	Report	Van de Beek 7'; D. López (yellow card) 47'; Romeu (yellow card) 57'	Stadium: Estadi Mallorca Son Moix; Attendance: 15,866; Referee: Francisco José Hernández Maeso

22 December 2024 18	Getafe	0–1	Mallorca	Getafe
14:00	Djené (yellow card) 21'; Yıldırım (yellow card) 33'; Rico (yellow card) 79'; Berrocal (yellow card) 80'	Report	Sánchez (yellow card) 16'; Larin 53' (pen.); Greif (yellow card) 59'; Navarro (yellow card) 87'	Stadium: Estadio Coliseum; Attendance: 9,747; Referee: José Luis Munuera Montero

19 January 2025 20	Villarreal	4–0	Mallorca	Villarreal
21:00	Costa 20'; Baena 24', (yellow card) 90+2'; Parejo 26'; Pino 28'	Report	Darder (yellow card) 40'; Rodríguez (yellow card) 45+4'; Mojica (yellow card) 89'	Stadium: Estadio de la Cerámica; Attendance: 14,852; Referee: José Luis Munuera Montero

26 January 2025 21	Mallorca	0–1	Real Betis	Palma
14:00	Larin (yellow card) 46'; Mascarell (yellow card) 48', (red card) 73'	Report	Ezzalzouli (yellow card) 16'; Bakambu (yellow card) 80', (goal) 90+6'	Stadium: Estadi Mallorca Son Moix; Attendance: 19,452; Referee: Javier Alberola Rojas

2 February 2025 22	Atlético Madrid	2–0	Mallorca	Madrid
18:30	Lino 26'; Le Normand (yellow card) 70'; Gallagher (yellow card) 82'; Griezmann 90+3'	Report	Valjent (yellow card) 65'; Navarro (yellow card) 72'; Copete (yellow card) 85'	Stadium: Cívitas Metropolitano; Attendance: 60,710; Referee: Víctor García Verdura

9 February 2025 23	Mallorca	1–1	Osasuna	Palma
21:00	Muriqi 81' (pen.); Maffeo (yellow card) 90'	Report	Torró (yellow card) 35'; Catena (yellow card) 79'; Boyomo (yellow card) 86', (goal) 90+4'; Oroz (yellow card) 86'	Stadium: Estadi Mallorca Son Moix; Attendance: 15,378; Referee: Adrián Cordero Vega

16 February 2025 24	Mallorca	3–1	Las Palmas	Palma
18:30 CET (UTC+1)	Muriqi 7', 28'; Rodríguez 35'; Larin (yellow card) 83'	Report	Loiodice (yellow card) 25'; Mármol (yellow card) 44'; Viti (yellow card) 45+1'; Bajčetić 62'; McKenna (yellow card) 90+6'	Stadium: Estadi Mallorca Son Moix; Attendance: 18,475; Referee: Miguel Ángel Ortiz Arias

23 February 2025 25	Sevilla	1–1	Mallorca	Seville
21:00	Salas 45+2'; Carmona (yellow card) 90'	Report	Darder (yellow card) 44'; Mojica (yellow card) 60'; Raíllo (yellow card) 71'; Valjent 90+1'	Stadium: Ramón Sánchez Pizjuán; Attendance: 35,424; Referee: Alejandro Muñiz Ruiz

2 March 2025 26	Mallorca	1–1	Alavés	Palma
18:30	Asano 9'	Report	Aleñá (yellow card) 64'; García 68'; Mouriño (yellow card) 78'	Stadium: Estadi Mallorca Son Moix; Attendance: 17.702; Referee: César Soto Grado

9 March 2025 27	Athletic Bilbao	1–1	Mallorca	Bilbao
18:30	Gorosabel (yellow card) 16'; Williams 58'; E.Valverde (yellow card) 62'	Report	Raíllo 56', (yellow card) 90+6'; Copete (yellow card) 72'; Sánchez (yellow card) 86'	Stadium: San Mamés; Attendance: 48.203; Referee: Alejandro José Hernández Hernández

16 March 2025 28	Mallorca	2–1	Espanyol	Palma
15:15 CET (UTC+1)	Muriqi (penalty missed) 62, 90+7' (pen.); Asano 65'; Abdón (penalty missed) 90+1,	Report	Muriqi 53' (o.g.); El Hilali (yellow card) 61'; Aguado (yellow card) 90+10'	Stadium: Estadi Mallorca Son Moix; Attendance: 18.240; Referee: Alejandro Quintero González

30 March 2025 29	Valencia	1–0	Mallorca	Valencia
18:30 CEDT (UTC+2)	López 50'; Rioja (yellow card) 84'; Barrenechea (yellow card) 85'; Foulquier (yellow card) 90+4'; Gayà (yellow card) 90+7'	Report	Raíllo (yellow card) 12'; Darder (yellow card) 45+1'; Costa (yellow card) 76'; Dani (yellow card) 90+10'	Stadium: Mestalla; Attendance: 44.082; Referee: Francisco José Hernández Maeso

6 April 2025 30	Mallorca	1–2	Celta Vigo	Palma
18:30 CEDT (UTC+2)	Valjent 17'; Rodríguez (yellow card) 41'; Morlanes (yellow card) 45+4'; Copete (yellow card) 53'	Report	Alfon 53'; López 72'	Stadium: Estadi Mallorca Son Moix; Attendance: 18.291; Referee: Francisco José Hernández Maeso

12 April 2025 31	Real Sociedad	0–2	Mallorca	San Sebastián
13:00 WEST (UTC+1)	Oyarzabal (yellow card) 71'; Zubimendi (yellow card) 90'; Elustondo (yellow card) 90+2'	Report	Larin 20'; Darder 47'; Maffeo (yellow card) 90+5'	Stadium: Reale Arena; Attendance: 29,181; Referee: José Luis Montero

19 April 2025 32	Mallorca	0–0	Leganés	Palma de Mallorca
18:30	Rodríguez (yellow card) 44'; Maffeo (yellow card) 59'	Report	Neyou (yellow card) 76'	Stadium: Son Moix; Attendance: 17.404; Referee: Alejandro Muñiz Ruiz

22 April 2025 33	Barcelona	1–0	Mallorca	Barcelona
21:30	Olmo 46'	Report	Samú (yellow card) 25'	Stadium: Camp Nou; Attendance: 45.602; Referee: Miguel Ortiz Arias

5 May 2025 34	Girona	1–0	Mallorca	Girona

10 May 2025 35	Mallorca	2–1	Valladolid	Palma

14 May 2025 36	Real Madrid	2–1	Mallorca	Madrid

18 May 2025 37	Mallorca	1–2	Getafe	Palma

24 May 2025 38	Rayo Vallecano	0–0	Mallorca	Madrid

=== Copa del Rey ===
3 January 2025 Round of 32	Pontevedra	3–0	Mallorca	Pontevedra
19:00	Almeida 21'; Yago Iglesias (yellow card) 25'; Yelko Pino 49', (yellow card) 54'; Fontán (yellow card) 54'; Rufo 72'; Sousa (yellow card) 75'; Pelayo (yellow card) 89'; Novo (yellow card) 90+5'	Report	Rodríguez (yellow card) 78'; Copete (yellow card) 89'	Stadium: Estadio Municipal de Pasarón; Attendance: 10.292; Referee: Alejandro Hernández Hernández

=== Supercopa de España ===
9 January 2025 Semi-finals	Real Madrid	3–0	Mallorca	Jeddah, Saudi Arabia
22:00 SAST (UTC+3)	Bellingham 63', (yellow card) 66'; Camavinga (yellow card) 74'; Valjent 90+2' (o.g.); Rodrygo 90+5'	Report		Stadium: King Abdullah Sports City; Referee: De Burgos Bengoetxea
