= Braian Cufré =

Argentine footballer

Personal information
- Full name: Braian Ezequiel Cufré
- Date of birth: 15 December 1996 (age 29)
- Place of birth: Mar del Plata, Argentina
- Height: 1.79 m (5 ft 10 in)
- Position: Left-back

Team information
- Current team: Aldosivi
- Number: 13

Youth career
- –2015: Vélez Sarsfield

Senior career*
Years	Team	Apps	(Gls)
2015–2020	Vélez Sarsfield	83	(3)
2020–2024	Mallorca	34	(1)
2021–2022	→ Málaga (loan)	25	(0)
2023	→ New York City FC (loan)	25	(2)
2024–2025	Vélez Sarsfield	0	(0)
2025	Central Córdoba SdE	27	(0)
2026	Remo	5	(0)
2026–	Aldosivi	9	(0)
- * Club domestic league appearances and goals as of 17:44, 6 November 2026 (UTC)

Braian Ezequiel Cufré (born 15 December 1996) is an Argentine professional footballer who plays as a left-back for Aldosivi.

== Club career ==
=== Vélez Sarsfield ===
Cufré is a youth exponent from Vélez Sarsfield. On 18 October 2015, he made his first team debut in a league game against CA Lanús in a 1–0 away win. He played the full game. He scored is first goal on 28 October 2018 in a 1–0 win against Belgrano.

=== Mallorca ===
On 28 September 2020, Cufré was officially announced as Mallorca's newest arrival, he signed for four seasons. He contributed with one goal in 29 league appearances during the campaign, as his club achieved promotion to La Liga.

On 11 August 2021, Cufré was loaned to Málaga CF for one year.

On 3 February 2023, Cufré signed on loan with New York City FC until the end of the Major League Soccer season with an option to make the transfer permanent. Upon returning, he terminated his contract with Mallorca on 31 January 2024.

== Career statistics ==
=== Club ===
As of match played 27 August 2021

Appearances and goals by club, season and competition
Club	Season	League			National Cup		League Cup		Continental		Total	
Club	Season	Division	Apps	Goals	Apps	Goals	Apps	Goals	Apps	Goals	Apps	Goals
Vélez Sarsfield	2015	Primera División	3	0	0	0	—		—		3	0
Vélez Sarsfield	2016	Primera División	7	0	0	0	—		—		7	0
Vélez Sarsfield	2016–17	Primera División	19	0	2	0	—		—		21	0
Vélez Sarsfield	2017–18	Primera División	14	0	0	0	—		—		14	0
Vélez Sarsfield	2018–19	Primera División	20	3	0	0	4	0	—		24	3
Vélez Sarsfield	2019–20	Primera División	20	0	0	0	1	0	2 (Note: Appearance(s) in Copa Sudamericana)	0	23	0
Vélez Sarsfield	Total		83	3	2	0	5	0	2	0	90	3
Mallorca	2020–21	Segunda División	29	1	2	0	—		—		31	1
Málaga (loan)	2021–22	Segunda División	3	0	0	0	—		—		3	0
Career total			115	4	4	0	5	0	2	0	126	4
