= Salva Sevilla =

Spanish footballer (born 1984)

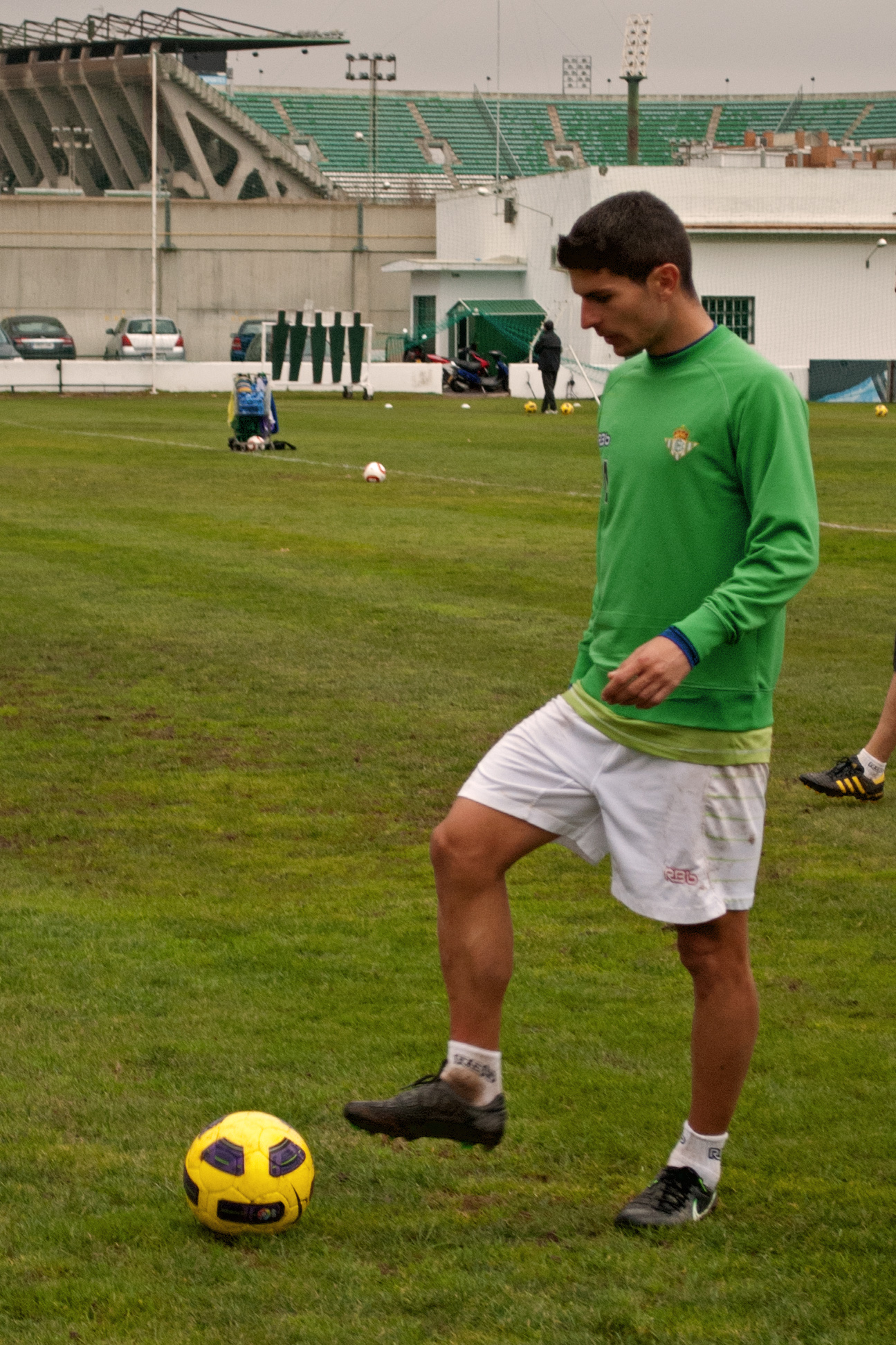
- Sevilla training with Betis in 2010

Personal information
- Full name: Salvador Sevilla López
- Date of birth: 18 March 1984 (age 42)
- Place of birth: Berja, Spain
- Height: 1.78 m (5 ft 10 in)
- Position: Central midfielder

Youth career
- Poli Ejido

Senior career*
Years	Team	Apps	(Gls)
2003–2005	Poli Ejido	10	(0)
2004–2005	→ Atlético Madrid C (loan)		
2005	→ Atlético Madrid B (loan)	1	(0)
2005–2008	Sevilla B	84	(11)
2008–2010	Salamanca	73	(17)
2010–2014	Betis	97	(11)
2014–2017	Espanyol	47	(1)
2017–2022	Mallorca	170	(24)
2022–2023	Alavés	36	(3)
2023–2024	Deportivo La Coruña	18	(1)
Total		536	(68)
- * Club domestic league appearances and goals

Salvador "Salva" Sevilla López (born 18 March 1984) is a Spanish former professional footballer who played as a central midfielder.

== Club career ==
Born in Berja, Province of Almería, Andalusia, Sevilla finished his development with local club Polideportivo Ejido. He made his professional debut on 12 October 2003, starting in a 2–2 away draw against Ciudad de Murcia in the Segunda División.

Sevilla was loaned to Atlético Madrid in summer 2004, but only appeared for its B and C sides. The following year he joined another reserve team, Sevilla Atlético also of the second division.

On 10 July 2008, Sevilla moved to UD Salamanca in the same league. He scored a career-best 11 goals in his second season, and joined Real Betis shortly after.

In his first year with the Verdiblancos, Sevilla contributed three goals in 33 matches to help his team to return to La Liga after a two-year absence. He made his top-flight debut on 27 August 2011, featuring 86 minutes of the 1–0 win at Granada CF.

Sevilla scored his first goal in the Spanish top tier on 18 September 2011, through a penalty kick in a 3–2 away victory over Athletic Bilbao. His second came in the same fashion against Real Zaragoza (4–3 win, home), and he finished the campaign with 19 starts and 1,446 minutes of action as Betis retained their league status.

On 13 March 2014, in only his seventh career game in the UEFA Europa League, Sevilla came on as a second-half substitute for Rubén Castro in the round-of-16 tie against former club Sevilla FC, and netted the last goal in the 2–0 away win. He signed a three-year contract with RCD Espanyol as a free agent in the summer, scoring the first goal of 2015–16 which was the game's only one at home against Getafe CF.

On 28 August 2017, 33-year-old Sevilla joined RCD Mallorca of Segunda División B on a free transfer. He was an undisputed starter for a side that achieved two consecutive promotions under Vicente Moreno, culminating with the 3–0 defeat of Deportivo de La Coruña on 23 June 2019 in the play-offs to overcome a 2–0 deficit from the first leg, with him scoring in the 62nd minute.

On 28 May 2022, Sevilla agreed to a one-year deal at Deportivo Alavés, recently relegated to division two. He totalled 42 games, four goals and three assists, winning promotion.

Sevilla signed a contract of the same duration at Deportivo on 30 August 2023. Having attained his seventh career promotion, the first from the Primera Federación, the 40-year-old left after not being retained.

== Personal life ==
Sevilla's older brother José Antonio was also a footballer. A central defender, his most notable club was Poli Ejido.

== Career statistics ==
As of match played 27 May 2023

Appearances and goals by club, season and competition
Club	Season	League			National Cup		Continental		Other		Total	
Club	Season	Division	Apps	Goals	Apps	Goals	Apps	Goals	Apps	Goals	Apps	Goals
Poli Ejido	2003–04	Segunda División	10	0	1	2	—		—		11	2
Atlético Madrid B (loan)	2004–05	Segunda División B	1	0	—		—		—		1	0
Sevilla B	2005–06	Segunda División B	30	4	—		—		2 (Note: Appearances in promotion playoffs)	0	32	4
Sevilla B	2006–07	Segunda División B	29	3	—		—		2	0	31	3
Sevilla B	2007–08	Segunda División	25	4	—		—		—		25	4
Sevilla B	Total		84	11	0	0	0	0	4	0	88	11
Salamanca	2008–09	Segunda División	35	6	2	0	—		—		37	6
Salamanca	2009–10	Segunda División	38	11	2	2	—		—		40	13
Salamanca	Total		73	17	4	2	0	0	0	0	77	19
Betis	2010–11	Segunda División	33	3	6	0	—		—		39	3
Betis	2011–12	La Liga	26	2	0	0	—		—		26	2
Betis	2012–13	La Liga	17	2	2	0	—		—		19	2
Betis	2013–14	La Liga	21	4	4	0	9 (Note: Appearances in UEFA Europa League)	1	—		34	5
Betis	Total		97	11	12	0	9	1	0	0	118	12
Espanyol	2014–15	La Liga	26	0	4	0	—		—		30	0
Espanyol	2015–16	La Liga	15	1	4	0	—		—		19	1
Espanyol	2016–17	La Liga	6	0	1	0	—		—		7	0
Espanyol	Total		47	1	9	0	0	0	0	0	56	1
Mallorca	2017–18	Segunda División B	32	4	1	0	—		4	0	37	4
Mallorca	2018–19	Segunda División	37	3	1	0	—		4	1	42	4
Mallorca	2019–20	La Liga	35	5	1	0	—		—		36	5
Mallorca	2020–21	Segunda División	38	7	1	0	—		—		39	7
Mallorca	2021–22	La Liga	28	5	4	0	—		—		32	5
Mallorca	Total		170	24	8	0	0	0	8	1	186	25
Alavés	2022–23	Segunda División	36	3	4	1	—				40	4
Career total			518	67	38	5	9	1	12	1	577	74

== Honours ==
Betis

- Segunda División: 2010–11

Mallorca

- Segunda División B: 2017–18

Deportivo La Coruña

- Primera Federación: 2023–24

Individual

- Segunda División Player of the Month: April 2019
