= Abdón Prats =

Spanish footballer

Abdón
Personal information
- Full name: Abdón Prats Bastidas
- Date of birth: 7 December 1992 (age 33)
- Place of birth: Artà, Spain
- Height: 1.81 m (5 ft 11 in)
- Position: Forward

Team information
- Current team: Mallorca
- Number: 9

Youth career
- Mallorca

Senior career*
Years	Team	Apps	(Gls)
2010–2013	Mallorca B	90	(25)
2012–2015	Mallorca	15	(2)
2013–2014	→ Burgos (loan)	34	(10)
2015	Tenerife	9	(0)
2015–2017	Mirandés	36	(5)
2017	Racing Santander	14	(10)
2017–	Mallorca	240	(39)
- * Club domestic league appearances and goals as of 23:01, 23 May 2026 (UTC)

Abdón Prats Bastidas (born 7 December 1992), known simply as Abdón, is a Spanish professional footballer who plays as a forward for Segunda División club Mallorca.

== Club career ==
Born in Artà, Balearic Islands, and a product of local RCD Mallorca's youth system, Abdón made his debut as a senior at the age of only 17, going on to spend several seasons in the Segunda División B with the reserves. On 13 December 2011 he made his first appearance with the main squad, playing two minutes in a 0–1 home loss against Sporting de Gijón in the round of 32 of the Copa del Rey.

On 28 April 2012, Abdón appeared in his first La Liga game, coming off the bench for Víctor Casadesús in the 3–1 win at Getafe CF. On 23 August of the following year he was loaned to third-division club Burgos CF, returning at the end of the campaign to Mallorca's first team, now competing in the Segunda División.

Abdón scored his first professional goal on 21 September 2014, but in a 4–6 home defeat to CA Osasuna. He terminated his contract the next transfer window, and signed with CD Tenerife of the same league shortly after.

On 3 July 2015, Abdón signed a two-year deal with CD Mirandés also in the second tier. He left the Estadio Municipal de Anduva by mutual consent in January 2017, and agreed terms with Racing de Santander later that day. He scored a career-best 14 goals – in only 19 matches – for the latter, but they failed to promote to division two.

Abdón returned to Mallorca in summer 2017, with the side now in the third division. Under Vicente Moreno, he was part of the squads that achieved two promotions in two years, totalling 18 goals in the process.

Abdón started 2023–24 strongly, scoring four times in as many matches in spite of limited playing time. He was also joint-top scorer of the year's Spanish Cup at six, helping the club to reach the final for the first time since 2003.

== Personal life ==
Abdón's uncle Toni was also a footballer. A goalkeeper, he too was brought up at Mallorca.

== Career statistics ==
As of match played 23 May 2026

Appearances and goals by club, season and competition
Club	Season	League			Copa del Rey		Other		Total	
Club	Season	Division	Apps	Goals	Apps	Goals	Apps	Goals	Apps	Goals
Mallorca B	2010–11	Segunda División B	25	5	—		—		25	5
Mallorca B	2011–12	Segunda División B	33	13	—		—		33	13
Mallorca B	2012–13	Segunda División B	32	7	—		—		32	7
Mallorca B	Total		90	25	0	0	0	0	90	25
Mallorca	2011–12	La Liga	1	0	2	0	—		3	0
Mallorca	2014–15	Segunda División	14	2	1	0	—		15	2
Mallorca	Total		15	2	3	0	0	0	18	2
Burgos (loan)	2013–14	Segunda División B	34	10	3	3	—		37	13
Tenerife	2014–15	Segunda División	9	0	0	0	—		9	0
Mirandés	2015–16	Segunda División	30	5	8	4	—		38	9
Mirandés	2016–17	Segunda División	6	0	1	0	—		7	0
Mirandés	Total		36	5	9	4	0	0	45	9
Racing Santander	2016–17	Segunda División B	14	10	0	0	5 (Note: Appearances in Segunda División B play-offs)	4	19	14
Mallorca	2017–18	Segunda División B	35	12	0	0	2	0	37	12
Mallorca	2018–19	Segunda División	31	5	1	1	4 (Note: Appearances in La Liga play-offs)	1	36	7
Mallorca	2019–20	La Liga	20	0	2	0	—		22	0
Mallorca	2020–21	Segunda División	31	10	2	2	—		33	12
Mallorca	2021–22	La Liga	23	3	4	1	—		27	4
Mallorca	2022–23	La Liga	26	1	3	3	—		29	4
Mallorca	2023–24	La Liga	34	6	8	6	—		42	12
Mallorca	2024–25	La Liga	24	2	1	0	1 (Note: Appearance in Supercopa de España)	0	26	2
Mallorca	2025–26	La Liga	15	0	3	4	—		18	4
Mallorca	Total		239	39	24	17	7	1	270	57
Career total			437	91	39	24	12	5	488	120

== Honours ==
Mallorca

- Segunda División B: 2017–18

Individual

- Segunda División Player of the Month: May 2021
