= Martin Valjent =

Slovak footballer

Personal information
- Full name: Martin Valjent
- Date of birth: 11 December 1995 (age 30)
- Place of birth: Dubnica nad Váhom, Slovakia
- Height: 1.87 m (6 ft 2 in)
- Position: Centre-back

Team information
- Current team: Mallorca
- Number: 24

Youth career
- Dubnica

Senior career*
Years	Team	Apps	(Gls)
2012–2013	Dubnica	14	(0)
2013–2017	Ternana	76	(2)
2017–2019	Chievo	0	(0)
2017–2018	→ Ternana (loan)	38	(3)
2018–2019	→ Mallorca (loan)	29	(0)
2019–	Mallorca	239	(4)

International career^{‡}
2013	Slovakia U18		
2014	Slovakia U19	14	(2)
2015–2017	Slovakia U21	19	(2)
2018–	Slovakia	21	(1)
- * Club domestic league appearances and goals as of 24 October 2026 ‡ National team caps and goals as of 15 November 2026

Martin Valjent (born 11 December 1995) is a Slovak professional footballer who plays as a centre-back for La Liga club Mallorca and the Slovakia national team.

== Club career ==
At the age of 17 in summer 2013, Valjent joined Italian Serie B club Ternana Calcio.

In August 2018, Valjent moved to RCD Mallorca on loan, a prominent team in Segunda División. In February 2021, he extended his contract with Mallorca until 2025, emphasizing his dedication to the club. On 24 February 2024, Valjent played his 200th match for RCD Mallorca in a 2023–24 Copa del Rey match against Deportivo Alavés which ended in a 1–1 draw. In 2025, he extended his contract until 2029.

== International career ==
Valjent was first called up to the Slovakia national team by Ján Kozák sr. for fixtures against Netherlands and Morocco on 31 May and 4 June 2018 respectively. This was done due to Gyömbér and Štetina's injuries. Valjent debuted during a match against Morocco in Geneva, replacing Tomáš Hubočan in the 79th minute.

Valjent's first competitive start came in a Euro 2020 qualifying fixture against Croatia on 6 September 2019 in Trnava, with Valjent playing as a right-back. Slovakia lost the game 4–0. It was that Valjent had a difficult task in defending Dejan Lovren at the side-line, as his preferred post is the one of a centre-back. In October, Valjent returned to the national team in a friendly match against Paraguay on his preferred post. His performance was reported on very positively, receiving praise from RTVS' commentary expert Marián Zeman during the farewell game for Martin Škrtel, with whom he starred in the starting XI, as well as Hubočan and Adam Nemec. This game also coincided with a return to Tehelné pole after some ten years and ended in a 1–1 draw.

On 26 August 2020, Valjent was called up by the Slovak senior squad to take part in the two opening matches of the UEFA Nations League against the Czech Republic and Israel.

Slovak media intensively speculated about the possible reasons for Valjent's continued exclusion from the national team after 2022, in spite of his consistent performances in La Liga. The manager of the national team Francesco Calzona refused to elaborate on the absence of call-ups, although he praised Valjnet's professionalism and positive attitude in the national team.

== Career statistics ==
=== Club ===
As of match played 24 October 2026

Appearances and goals by club, season and competition
Club	Season	League			National cup		Other		Total	
Club	Season	Division	Apps	Goals	Apps	Goals	Apps	Goals	Apps	Goals
Dubnica	2012–13	2. liga	14	0	—		—		14	0
Ternana	2013–14	Serie B	6	0	0	0	—		6	0
Ternana	2014–15	Serie B	35	0	2	0	—		37	0
Ternana	2015–16	Serie B	25	2	2	0	—		27	2
Ternana	2016–17	Serie B	33	0	2	0	—		35	0
Ternana	Total		76	2	6	0	0	0	82	2
Chievo	2018–19	Serie A	0	0	0	0	—		0	0
Ternana (loan)	2017–18	Serie B	38	3	1	0	—		39	3
Mallorca (loan)	2018–19	Segunda División	29	0	2	0	4 (Note: Appearance(s) in Promotion Playoffs)	0	35	0
Mallorca	2019–20	La Liga	36	0	1	0	—		37	0
Mallorca	2020–21	Segunda División	33	1	1	0	—		34	1
Mallorca	2021–22	La Liga	36	0	3	0	—		39	0
Mallorca	2022–23	La Liga	30	0	2	0	—		32	0
Mallorca	2023–24	La Liga	28	0	4	0	—		32	0
Mallorca	2024–25	La Liga	31	3	1	0	1 (Note: Appearance in Supercopa de España)	0	33	3
Mallorca	2025–26	La Liga	36	0	2	0	—		38	0
Mallorca	2026–27	Segunda División	9	0	0	0	—		9	0
Mallorca	Total		268	4	16	0	5	0	289	4
Career total			395	9	22	0	5	0	422	9

=== International ===
As of match played 13 November 2026

Appearances and goals by national team and year
National team	Year	Apps	Goals
Slovakia	2018	1	0
Slovakia	2019	2	0
Slovakia	2020	5	0
Slovakia	2021	1	0
Slovakia	2022	4	0
Slovakia	2026	8	1
Total		21	1

Slovakia score listed first, score column indicates score after each Valjent goal.

List of international goals scored by Valjent
No.	Date	Venue	Opponent	Score	Result	Competition
1	26 March 2026	Tehelné pole, Bratislava, Slovakia	Kosovo	1–0	3–4	2026 FIFA World Cup qualification
