= Antonio Raíllo =

Spanish footballer

Personal information
- Full name: Antonio José Raíllo Arenas
- Date of birth: 8 October 1991 (age 35)
- Place of birth: Córdoba, Spain
- Height: 1.87 m (6 ft 2 in)
- Position: Centre-back

Team information
- Current team: Mallorca
- Number: 21

Youth career
- Séneca

Senior career*
Years	Team	Apps	(Gls)
2010–2011	Pozoblanco	33	(1)
2011–2012	Betis B	12	(0)
2012–2013	Córdoba B	30	(1)
2013–2015	Espanyol B	65	(6)
2015–2016	Espanyol	4	(0)
2016	→ Ponferradina (loan)	16	(1)
2016–	Mallorca	310	(17)
- * Club domestic league appearances and goals as of 18:16, 24 October 2026 (UTC)

Antonio José Raíllo Arenas (born 8 October 1991) is a Spanish professional footballer who plays as a centre-back for Segunda División club Mallorca, where he is captain.

== Club career ==
Born in Córdoba, Andalusia, Raíllo graduated from local Séneca CF's youth system, and made his debut as a senior with CD Pozoblanco in the 2010–11 season, in the Tercera División. On 8 March 2011, he signed for Real Betis with the deal being made effective in June, and was subsequently assigned to their reserves in the Segunda División B.

In August 2012, Raíllo joined another reserve team, Córdoba CF B of the fourth division. On 9 July of the following year he transferred to RCD Espanyol on a one-year contract, moving to its B side in the third tier after achieving promotion with the former.

Raíllo agreed to a new deal with the Catalans on 22 May 2015, until 2018, being promoted to the main squad in La Liga. He first appeared in the competition on 22 August, playing the full 90 minutes in a 1–0 home win against Getafe CF.

On 27 January 2016, having totalled just six appearances, Raíllo was loaned to Segunda División club SD Ponferradina until June. He scored his first professional goal on 29 May, equalising the 1–1 away draw with CD Tenerife.

Raíllo signed a three-year contract with RCD Mallorca on 29 June 2016. Under Vicente Moreno, he was part of the squad that won two consecutive promotions to the reach the top flight in 2019.

In the 2023–24 campaign, Raíllo helped Mallorca to reach the final of the Copa del Rey for the first time in 21 years. A longtime captain, on 18 February 2024 he became the club's ninth player with the most appearances (242), but also the one with the most ejections (eight, tied with Sergio Ballesteros).

== Personal life ==
Raíllo's older brother, Manuel (born 1990), was also a footballer. The forward spent his entire career in the lower and amateur leagues.

== Career statistics ==
As of match played 24 October 2026

Appearances and goals by club, season and competition
Club	Season	League			National Cup		Other		Total	
Club	Season	Division	Apps	Goals	Apps	Goals	Apps	Goals	Apps	Goals
Pozoblanco	2010–11	Tercera División	33	1	—		4 (Note: Appearances in promotion playoffs)	0	37	1
Betis B	2011–12	Segunda División B	12	0	—		—		12	0
Córdoba B	2012–13	Tercera División	30	1	—		3	0	33	1
Espanyol B	2013–14	Segunda División B	31	4	—		—		31	4
Espanyol B	2014–15	Segunda División B	34	2	—		—		34	2
Espanyol B	Total		65	6	0	0	0	0	65	6
Espanyol	2015–16	La Liga	4	0	2	0	—		6	0
Ponferradina (loan)	2015–16	Segunda División	16	1	0	0	—		16	1
Mallorca	2016–17	Segunda División	29	2	0	0	—		29	2
Mallorca	2017–18	Segunda División B	33	0	1	0	2	1	36	1
Mallorca	2018–19	Segunda División	35	2	0	0	4	0	39	2
Mallorca	2019–20	La Liga	32	1	2	0	—		34	1
Mallorca	2020–21	Segunda División	36	2	0	0	—		36	2
Mallorca	2021–22	La Liga	17	2	0	0	—		17	2
Mallorca	2022–23	La Liga	31	2	2	0	—		33	2
Mallorca	2023–24	La Liga	26	3	5	0	—		31	3
Mallorca	2024–25	La Liga	36	2	0	0	1 (Note: Appearance in Supercopa de España)	0	37	2
Mallorca	2025–26	La Liga	24	0	0	0	—		24	0
Mallorca	2026–27	Segunda División	11	1	0	0	—		11	1
Mallorca	Total		310	17	10	0	7	2	327	19
Career total			468	25	12	0	14	1	494	24
