= Manolo Reina =

Spanish footballer

Personal information
- Full name: Manuel Reina Rodríguez
- Date of birth: 1 April 1985 (age 41)
- Place of birth: Villanueva del Trabuco, Spain
- Height: 1.86 m (6 ft 1 in)
- Position: Goalkeeper

Youth career
- 1997–2004: Málaga

Senior career*
Years	Team	Apps	(Gls)
2004–2007	Málaga B	38	(0)
2006	Málaga	1	(0)
2007	Levante B	11	(0)
2008–2011	Levante	74	(0)
2011–2012	Cartagena	27	(0)
2012–2013	AEP	15	(0)
2013	Atromitos	0	(0)
2013–2017	Gimnàstic	124	(0)
2017–2022	Mallorca	165	(0)
2022–2023	Málaga	13	(0)
Total		468	(0)
- * Club domestic league appearances and goals

Manuel "Manolo" Reina Rodríguez (Spanish pronunciation: [maˈnolo ˈrejna]; born 1 April 1985) is a Spanish former professional footballer who played as a goalkeeper.

== Club career ==
Born in Villanueva del Trabuco, Málaga, Andalusia, Reina was a product of hometown Málaga CF's youth system. He appeared in one game with the first team in the 2005–06 season, against Valencia CF in a 0–0 home draw, as they went on to rank last in La Liga.

In 2007, Reina joined Levante UD, but played mainly for the reserves during his early spell. However, the club's severe financial crisis led to him becoming first choice after the departure of Marco Storari; in eight matches, he conceded 18 goals.

Reina totalled 48 appearances the next two seasons, the last of them ending in top-flight promotion. For 2010–11 he was initially deemed second choice, to newly signed Gustavo Munúa. However, after the Uruguayan conceded ten goals in the first three matches, he was selected for the next two rounds, keeping clean sheets against UD Almería (1–0 away win) and Real Madrid (0–0, at home); he eventually lost his starting position again, finishing the campaign with 18 games as the Valencians eventually retained their status.

On 20 June 2011, Reina signed for FC Cartagena of the second division. After their relegation he moved abroad for the first time in his career, joining Cypriot First Division's AEP Paphos FC.

Reina switched teams and countries again on 30 January 2013, signing with Super League Greece club Atromitos F.C. as a replacement for PAOK FC-bound Charles Itandje. He was mostly a backup to Velimir Radman, and left in June after making no competitive appearances.

On 2 July 2013, Reina returned to his country and penned a contract with Segunda División B side Gimnàstic de Tarragona. He was an undisputed starter during his four-year spell, achieving promotion to the second division in his second season.

Reina cut ties with the club on 6 July 2017, and signed for RCD Mallorca 13 days later. He won two consecutive promotions to return to the top tier – always as first choice – adding another one at the end of the 2020–21 campaign.

Reina returned to the La Rosaleda Stadium in June 2022 after 15 years away, on a two-year deal.

== Career statistics ==
Appearances and goals by club, season and competition
Club	Season	League			National cup		Other		Total	
Club	Season	Division	Apps	Goals	Apps	Goals	Apps	Goals	Apps	Goals
Málaga B	2003–04	Segunda División	0	0	—		—		0	0
Málaga B	2004–05	Segunda División	2	0	—		—		2	0
Málaga B	2005–06	Segunda División	10	0	—		—		10	0
Málaga B	2006–07	Segunda División B	26	0	—		—		26	0
Málaga B	Total		38	0	—		—		38	0
Málaga	2005–06	La Liga	1	0	0	0	—		1	0
Málaga	2006–07	Segunda División	0	0	0	0	—		0	0
Málaga	Total		1	0	0	0	—		1	0
Levante B	2007–08	Segunda División B	11	0	—		—		11	0
Levante	2007–08	La Liga	8	0	0	0	—		8	0
Levante	2008–09	Segunda División	26	0	1	0	—		27	0
Levante	2009–10	Segunda División	22	0	0	0	—		22	0
Levante	2010–11	La Liga	18	0	0	0	—		18	0
Levante	Total		74	0	1	0	—		75	0
Cartagena	2011–12	Segunda División	27	0	0	0	—		27	0
AEP	2012–13	Cypriot First Division	15	0	2	0	—		17	0
Atromitos	2012–13	Super League Greece	0	0	0	0	—		0	0
Gimnàstic	2013–14	Segunda División B	25	0	2	0	6 (Note: Appearances in promotion playoffs)	0	33	0
Gimnàstic	2014–15	Segunda División B	35	0	0	0	2	0	37	0
Gimnàstic	2015–16	Segunda División	41	0	0	0	2	0	43	0
Gimnàstic	2016–17	Segunda División	23	0	1	0	—		24	0
Gimnàstic	Total		124	0	3	0	10	0	137	0
Mallorca	2017–18	Segunda División B	35	0	0	0	2	0	37	0
Mallorca	2018–19	Segunda División	34	0	0	0	4	0	38	0
Mallorca	2019–20	La Liga	36	0	0	0	—		36	0
Mallorca	2020–21	Segunda División	39	0	0	0	—		39	0
Mallorca	2021–22	La Liga	21	0	0	0	—		21	0
Mallorca	Total		165	0	0	0	6	0	171	0
Málaga	2022–23	Segunda División	13	0	2	0	—		15	0
Career total			468	0	8	0	16	0	492	0

== Honours ==
Gimnàstic

- Segunda División B: 2014–15

Mallorca

- Segunda División B: 2017–18
