= Iván Bravo =

Spanish footballer

Personal information
- Full name: Iván Bravo Castro
- Date of birth: 20 January 2001 (age 25)
- Place of birth: Salt, Spain
- Height: 1.81 m (5 ft 11 in)
- Position: Left back

Team information
- Current team: Peña Sport

Youth career
- 2005–2008: La Salle Girona
- 2008–2010: Girona
- 2010–2019: Barcelona
- 2019–2020: Mallorca

Senior career*
Years	Team	Apps	(Gls)
2020–2021	Mallorca B	14	(0)
2020–2021	Mallorca	1	(0)
2021–2022	Osasuna B	1	(0)
2022–2023	Badalona	22	(0)
2023–2024	Europa	9	(0)
2024–2025	Manresa	23	(0)
2025–	Peña Sport	8	(0)
- * Club domestic league appearances and goals as of 8 November 2025

Iván Bravo Castro (born 20 January 2001) is a Spanish footballer who plays for Tercera Federación club Peña Sport as a left back.

== Club career ==
Bravo was born in Salt, Girona, Catalonia, and joined FC Barcelona's La Masia in 2010, after representing Girona FC and UE La Salle Girona. In 2019, he moved to RCD Mallorca and was assigned to their Juvenil A squad.

Bravo started to train with the main squad in May 2020, after the COVID-19 pandemic, and took part of the club's 2020 pre-season. On 13 September, before even appearing with the reserves, he made his professional debut by starting in a 0–1 home loss against Rayo Vallecano.

On 16 July 2021, Bravo signed a two-year contract with another reserve team, CA Osasuna in Segunda División B.
