= Dani Rodríguez (footballer, born 1988) =

Spanish footballer

Personal information
- Full name: Daniel José Rodríguez Vázquez
- Date of birth: 6 June 1988 (age 38)
- Place of birth: Betanzos, Spain
- Height: 1.78 m (5 ft 10 in)
- Position: Central midfielder

Team information
- Current team: Leganés
- Number: 9

Youth career
- 1999–2007: Deportivo La Coruña

Senior career*
Years	Team	Apps	(Gls)
2007–2011	Deportivo B	99	(11)
2007–2008	→ Betanzos (loan)	38	(8)
2010	Deportivo La Coruña	0	(0)
2011–2012	Conquense	32	(2)
2012–2015	Racing Ferrol	104	(14)
2015–2016	Racing Santander	36	(5)
2016–2018	Albacete	72	(11)
2018–2025	Mallorca	259	(28)
2026–	Leganés	25	(0)
- * Club domestic league appearances and goals as of 21:22, 29 September 2026 (UTC)

Daniel 'Dani' José Rodríguez Vázquez (born 6 June 1988) is a Spanish professional footballer who plays as a central midfielder for Segunda División club Leganés.

== Career ==
=== Deportivo ===
Born in Betanzos, Province of A Coruña, Galicia, Rodríguez finished his youth career with Deportivo de La Coruña, and made his senior debut while on loan at Betanzos CF in the 2007–08 season, in the Tercera División. After returning to his parent club, he was assigned to the reserves in the Segunda División B.

On 27 January 2010, Rodríguez made his only competitive appearance with the first team, as a 65th-minute substitute in a 1–0 away win against Sevilla FC in the quarter-finals of the Copa del Rey. In August of the following year, he joined UB Conquense of the third division.

=== Journeyman ===
Rodríguez then spent three seasons with Racing de Ferrol, where he excelled under manager José Manuel Aira; shortly before his arrival, the 24-year-old had contemplated retirement to study sport psychology. After achieving promotion from Tercera División at the end of his first, he renewed his contract until 2015.

Subsequently, Rodríguez represented third-tier sides Racing de Santander and Albacete Balompié. With the latter, he won promotion to Segunda División in the 2016–17 campaign.

Rodríguez scored his first professional goal on 8 October 2017, through a late penalty kick in the 2–1 home victory over Lorca FC. He finished the season with a further five and four assists, while only missing four games.

=== Mallorca ===
In June 2018, Rodríguez moved to RCD Mallorca on a three-year deal as a free agent. For the vast majority of his spell in the Balearic Islands, he was an undisputed first-choice.

Rodríguez achieved La Liga promotions with the club in 2019 and 2021. Additionally, in 2024 he helped his team to reach the final of the domestic cup for the first time in 21 years, scoring in the decisive match against Athletic Bilbao, a penalty shootout loss in Seville following a 1–1 draw. He also found the net in their first league win of 2024–25, a 1–0 away defeat of CD Leganés.

On 3 September 2025, Mallorca suspended Rodríguez without pay and stripped him of the captaincy after he publicly complained about being benched during their weekend defeat at Real Madrid when his family was watching. On 18 December, he had his contract terminated by mutual agreement.

=== Leganés ===
On 21 January 2026, the 37-year-old Rodríguez joined second-division CD Leganés on a six-month deal.

== Career statistics ==
As of match played 22 August 2025

Appearances and goals by club, season and competition
Club	Season	League			National cup		Other		Total	
Club	Season	Division	Apps	Goals	Apps	Goals	Apps	Goals	Apps	Goals
Deportivo B	2008–09	Segunda División B	34	0	—		—		34	0
Deportivo B	2009–10	Tercera División	33	9	—		2 (Note: Appearances in Tercera División play-offs)	0	35	9
Deportivo B	2010–11	Segunda División B	32	2	—		—		32	2
Deportivo B	Total		99	11	0	0	2	0	101	11
Deportivo La Coruña	2009–10	La Liga	0	0	1	0	—		1	0
Betanzos (loan)	2007–08	Tercera División	38	8	—		—		38	8
Conquense	2011–12	Segunda División B	32	2	—		2 (Note: Appearances in Segunda División B play-offs)	0	34	2
Racing Ferrol	2012–13	Tercera División	36	7	—		2	0	38	7
Racing Ferrol	2013–14	Segunda División B	31	2	1	0	2	0	34	2
Racing Ferrol	2014–15	Segunda División B	37	5	0	0	4	0	41	5
Racing Ferrol	Total		104	14	1	0	8	0	113	14
Racing Santander	2015–16	Segunda División B	36	5	1	0	4	0	41	5
Albacete	2016–17	Segunda División B	34	5	3	0	5	1	42	6
Albacete	2017–18	Segunda División	38	6	1	0	—		39	6
Albacete	Total		72	11	4	0	5	1	81	12
Mallorca	2018–19	Segunda División	38	3	1	0	4 (Note: Appearances in La Liga play-offs)	1	43	4
Mallorca	2019–20	La Liga	37	5	1	0	—		38	5
Mallorca	2020–21	Segunda División	38	8	0	0	—		38	8
Mallorca	2021–22	La Liga	36	3	4	0	—		40	3
Mallorca	2022–23	La Liga	35	3	4	1	—		39	4
Mallorca	2023–24	La Liga	36	2	7	2	—		43	4
Mallorca	2024–25	La Liga	37	4	1	0	1 (Note: Appearance in Supercopa de España)	0	39	4
Mallorca	2025–26	La Liga	2	0	0	0	—		2	0
Mallorca	Total		259	28	18	3	5	1	282	32
Career total			640	79	25	3	26	2	691	84
