= Iddrisu Baba =

Ghanaian footballer

Personal information
- Full name: Iddrisu Baba Mohammed
- Date of birth: 22 January 1996 (age 30)
- Place of birth: Accra, Ghana
- Height: 1.85 m (6 ft 1 in)
- Position: Defensive midfielder

Team information
- Current team: Partizan
- Number: 14

Youth career
- Leganés
- → Mallorca (loan)

Senior career*
Years	Team	Apps	(Gls)
2015–2016	Leganés	0	(0)
2015–2016	→ Mallorca B (loan)	32	(1)
2016–2024	Mallorca	140	(1)
2016–2019	Mallorca B	32	(1)
2017–2018	→ Barakaldo (loan)	30	(1)
2023–2024	→ Almería (loan)	25	(0)
2024–2026	Almería	33	(0)
2026–	Partizan	12	(0)

International career^{‡}
2019–	Ghana	29	(0)
- * Club domestic league appearances and goals as of 22 November 2026 ‡ National team caps and goals as of 7 August 2026

Iddrisu Baba Mohammed (born 22 January 1996) is a Ghanaian professional footballer who plays as a defensive midfielder for Serbian SuperLiga club Partizan and the Ghana national team.

== Club career ==
Born in Accra, Baba moved to Spain at an early age and joined CD Leganés' youth setup, before being loaned to RCD Mallorca. He made his senior debut for the latter's reserves on 29 August 2015, coming on as a second-half substitute in a 7–1 Tercera División home routing of Penya Ciutadella.

Baba scored his first senior goal on 8 May 2016, netting the opener in a 2–1 home win against CF Platges de Calvià. On 23 June, after achieving promotion, he was bought outright by the Bermellones.

On 25 August 2017, Baba was loaned to Barakaldo CF in Segunda División B, for one year. Upon returning, he was promoted to the main squad in Segunda División, and made his professional debut on 19 August 2018, replacing Carlos Castro in a 1–0 home win against CA Osasuna.

On 3 July 2019, after contributing with 28 matches (play-offs included) as his side achieved promotion to La Liga, Baba renewed his contract until 2022. He made his debut in the category on 17 August, starting in a 2–1 home win over SD Eibar.

Baba scored his first professional goal on 31 October 2021, netting the opener in a 1–1 away draw against Cádiz CF. On 10 August 2023, he moved to fellow top-tier side UD Almería in a season-long loan deal, with a buyout clause.

On 4 July 2024, Almería announced the permanent signing of Baba on a three-year contract following their relegation from the top flight. On 7 August 2026, he was presented at Serbian side FK Partizan.

== International career ==
On 13 November 2019, Baba was called up for the Ghana national team to 2021 Africa Cup of Nations qualification matches against South Africa and São Tomé and Príncipe. He made his full international debut in the following day, starting in a 2–0 win over the former. He was part of the Ghanaian team in the 2021 African Cup of Nations and sustained an injury in the match against Gabon.

== Career statistics ==
=== Club ===
As of match played 7 August 2026

Appearances and goals by club, season and competition
Club	Season	League			Copa del Rey		Other		Total	
Club	Season	Division	Apps	Goals	Apps	Goals	Apps	Goals	Apps	Goals
Mallorca B (loan)	2015–16	Tercera División	32	1	—		2 (Note: Appearance(s) in Promotion Playoffs)	0	34	1
Mallorca B	2016–17	Segunda División B	29	1	—		—		29	1
Mallorca B	2017–18	Tercera División	2	0	—		—		2	0
Mallorca B	2018–19	Tercera División	1	0	—		—		1	0
Mallorca B	Total		32	1	0	0	0	0	32	1
Barakaldo (loan)	2017–18	Segunda División B	30	1	—		—		30	1
Mallorca	2018–19	Segunda División	25	0	2	0	3	0	30	0
Mallorca	2019–20	La Liga	36	0	1	0	—		37	0
Mallorca	2020–21	Segunda División	24	0	2	0	—		26	0
Mallorca	2021–22	La Liga	26	1	0	0	—		26	1
Mallorca	2022–23	La Liga	29	0	1	0	—		30	0
Mallorca	Total		140	1	6	0	3	0	149	1
Almería (loan)	2023–24	La Liga	25	0	1	0	—		26	0
Almería	2024–25	Segunda División	10	0	—		—		10	0
Almería	2025–26	Segunda División	23	0	1	0	—		24	0
Almería	Total		33	0	1	0	0	0	34	0
Career total			292	4	8	0	5	0	305	4

=== International ===
As of match played 11 June 2021

Appearances and goals by national team and year
National team	Year	Apps	Goals
Ghana	2019	2	0
Ghana	2020	1	0
Ghana	2021	8	0
Ghana	2022	9	0
Ghana	2023	4	0
Ghana	2024	5	0
Total		29	0
