= Sergio Buenacasa =

Spanish footballer (born 1996)

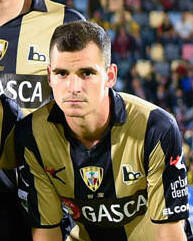

Personal information
- Full name: Sergio Buenacasa Alba
- Date of birth: 19 April 1996 (age 30)
- Place of birth: Zaragoza, Spain
- Height: 1.82 m (5 ft 11 1/2 in)
- Position: Forward

Youth career
- San Gregorio
- Zaragoza
- 2010–2013: Barcelona
- 2013–2015: Juventus

Senior career*
Years	Team	Apps	(Gls)
2015–2017	Zaragoza B	60	(26)
2015–2016	Zaragoza	3	(0)
2017–2018	Barakaldo	38	(14)
2018–2020	Mallorca	8	(0)
2019–2020	→ Ponferradina (loan)	2	(0)
2020	→ Málaga (loan)	14	(0)
2020–2021	Hércules	24	(3)
2021–2022	Cultural Leonesa	19	(4)
2022–2023	La Nucía	11	(1)
2023	→ Talavera (loan)	17	(4)
2023–2024	Teruel	14	(1)
2024	Terrassa	25	(8)
2025	Lleida Esportiu	2	(0)
- * Club domestic league appearances and goals as of 18 January 2025

Sergio Buenacasa Alba (born 19 April 1996) is a Spanish footballer who plays as a forward.

== Club career ==
Born in Zaragoza, Aragon, Buenacasa joined FC Barcelona's youth setup in 2010, aged 14, after spells at Real Zaragoza and San Gregorio CD. On 30 August 2013 he moved to Juventus FC on a free transfer, being initially assigned to its Primavera squad.

On 31 August 2015, after spending the whole pre-season with Juventus' first team, Buenacasa returned to Zaragoza. Initially assigned to the reserves, he made his senior debut on 25 October, starting and scoring the opener in a 2–1 away win against CD Binéfar in the Tercera División.

On 7 December 2015 Buenacasa made his professional debut, coming on as a late substitute for Alfredo Ortuño in a 1–0 Segunda División away win against Bilbao Athletic. On 14 July 2017, he signed for Segunda División B side Barakaldo CF.

On 18 June 2018, after scoring 14 goals for Barakaldo, Buenacasa signed a three-year contract with RCD Mallorca in the second division. He contributed with only eight league appearances during the campaign, as his side achieved promotion to La Liga, and was loaned to second division side SD Ponferradina on 12 July 2019.

On 11 January 2020, after being rarely used, Buenacasa moved to fellow second tier side Málaga CF on loan for the remainder of the campaign. On 11 September, he signed a one-year deal with Hércules CF in the third tier.
