= Sergio Moyita =

Spanish footballer (born 1992)

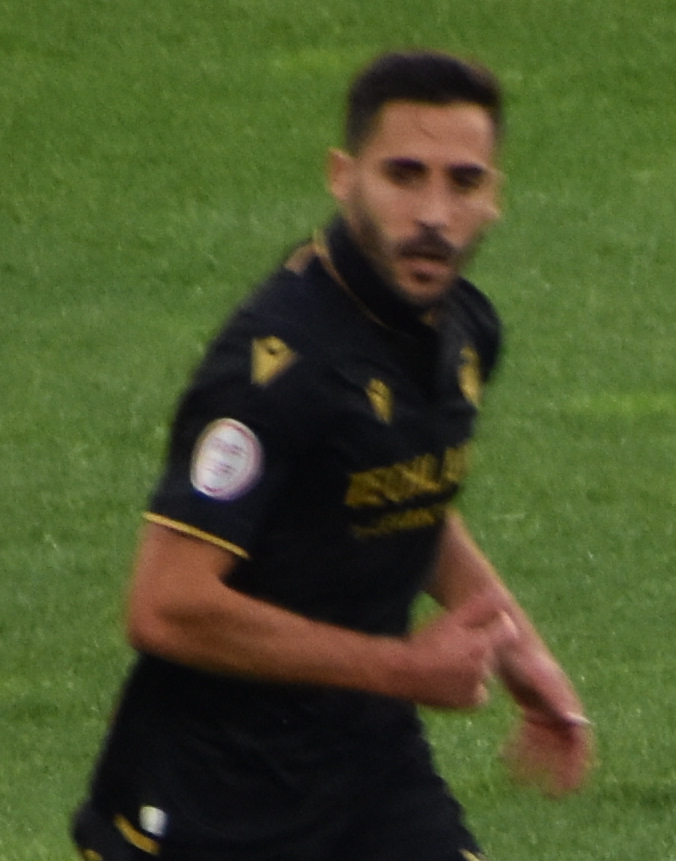
- Moyita playing for Castellón in 2024

Personal information
- Full name: Sergio Dueñas Ruiz
- Date of birth: 11 September 1992 (age 34)
- Place of birth: Osuna, Spain
- Height: 1.74 m (5 ft 9 in)
- Position: Midfielder

Team information
- Current team: Murcia
- Number: 7

Youth career
- Marinaleda

Senior career*
Years	Team	Apps	(Gls)
2010–2011	Marinaleda	24	(4)
2011–2013	Osuna Bote		
2013	Alcalá	16	(1)
2013–2015	Betis B	27	(3)
2015	Villanovense	9	(1)
2015–2018	Écija	94	(11)
2018–2020	Mallorca	0	(0)
2018–2019	→ Cartagena (loan)	31	(5)
2019–2020	→ Rayo Majadahonda (loan)	21	(2)
2020–2021	Hércules	20	(2)
2021–2022	UCAM Murcia	24	(4)
2022–2023	Deinze	28	(5)
2022–2023	→ Alcoyano (loan)	28	(5)
2023–2025	Castellón	57	(7)
2025–	Murcia	17	(0)
- * Club domestic league appearances and goals as of 10 June 2026

Sergio Dueñas Ruiz (born 11 September 1992), known as Sergio Moyita or just Moyita, is a Spanish professional footballer who plays as a midfielder for Murcia.

== Club career ==
Born in Osuna, Seville, Andalusia, Moyita first appeared as a senior with UD Marinaleda in Tercera División. In January 2013, after a 18-month spell with hometown Osuna Bote Club, he signed for CD Alcalá still in the fourth division.

Moyita joined Real Betis on 15 July 2013, being assigned to the reserves also in the fourth level. After helping in the club's promotion to Segunda División B, he only featured in one match during the 2014–15 season, and subsequently joined fellow third division side CF Villanovense on 23 January 2015 after terminating his contract with the Verdiblancos.

On 17 July 2015, Moyita moved to Écija Balompié in the fourth tier, and achieved promotion to the third division in 2017. His best individual input for the club came in the 2017–18 campaign, where he scored seven goals in 36 appearances.

On 21 June 2018, Moyita agreed to a two-year contract with Segunda División side RCD Mallorca, but was loaned to FC Cartagena in the third division on 29 August. On 3 September of the following year, he moved to fellow league team CF Rayo Majadahonda also in a temporary deal.

On 1 October 2020, Moyita signed a one-year deal with Hércules CF, still in division three. The following 19 July, he agreed to a deal with UCAM Murcia CF in Primera División RFEF.

On 26 June 2022, Moyita moved abroad for the first time in his career and signed a two-year contract with KMSK Deinze of the Belgian Challenger Pro League, but returned to Spain on 27 July due to "personal reasons", being loaned to CD Alcoyano also in the third division. On 21 July 2023, he joined CD Castellón in the same category, and helped in their promotion to the second division at the end of the season.

Moyita made his professional debut at the age of 31 on 17 August 2024, starting in a 1–0 away loss to SD Eibar. He scored his first goal in the category on 18 April of the following year, netting the equalizer in a 4–1 home routing of UD Almería.

On 9 July 2025, Moyita signed with Murcia in Primera Federación.

== Personal life ==
Moyita's older brother Manuel is also a footballer who plays as a winger. Both played together at Marinaleda, Osuna Bote and Alcalá.
