= Kosovo national football team records and statistics =

The Kosovo national football team (Albanian: Kombëtarja e futbollit të Kosovës; Serbian: Фудбалска репрезентација Косова, romanized: Fudbalska reprezentacija Kosova) represents Kosovo in men's international football. The team is controlled by the Football Federation of Kosovo, the governing body for football in Kosovo, and is under the jurisdiction of FIFA globally. Kosovo was admitted as a member of UEFA and FIFA in May 2016, allowing the team to participate in official international competitions. Prior to official recognition, Kosovan players were eligible to play for other national teams, most notably Albania national team.

Kosovo played its first official match on 5 March 2014, a friendly against Haiti national team, before gaining FIFA membership. Since joining UEFA and FIFA, Kosovo has participated in qualification campaigns for the FIFA World Cup and the UEFA European Championship. The team has yet to qualify for a major tournament, but it has achieved notable results in friendly matches and UEFA Nations League competitions.

The team's home matches are primarily held at the Fadil Vokrri Stadium in Pristina. Kosovo's kit is traditionally blue and white, and the squad has included players competing in top European leagues. The national team has become a symbol of national identity and pride, reflecting the development of football infrastructure and talent in Kosovo.

Caps and goals are correct as of 24 September 2026, after the match against Republic of Ireland.

Kosovo also played its first recorded match in history on 29 November 1942, a friendly as part of the celebrations for the 30th Anniversary of the Independence of Albania against Tirana, (Note: The alternative name of the Albania national team that was used during this match.) which ended in a 2–0 away defeat.

== Player records ==
- Players in **bold** are called up to the squad in last 12 months and are still active at international level.
- Players with flags in front of their name are players who represented Kosovo, but now represent another national team.
- Player is not available at international level due to FIFA eligibility rules.

=== Most appearances ===
As of 4 October 2026

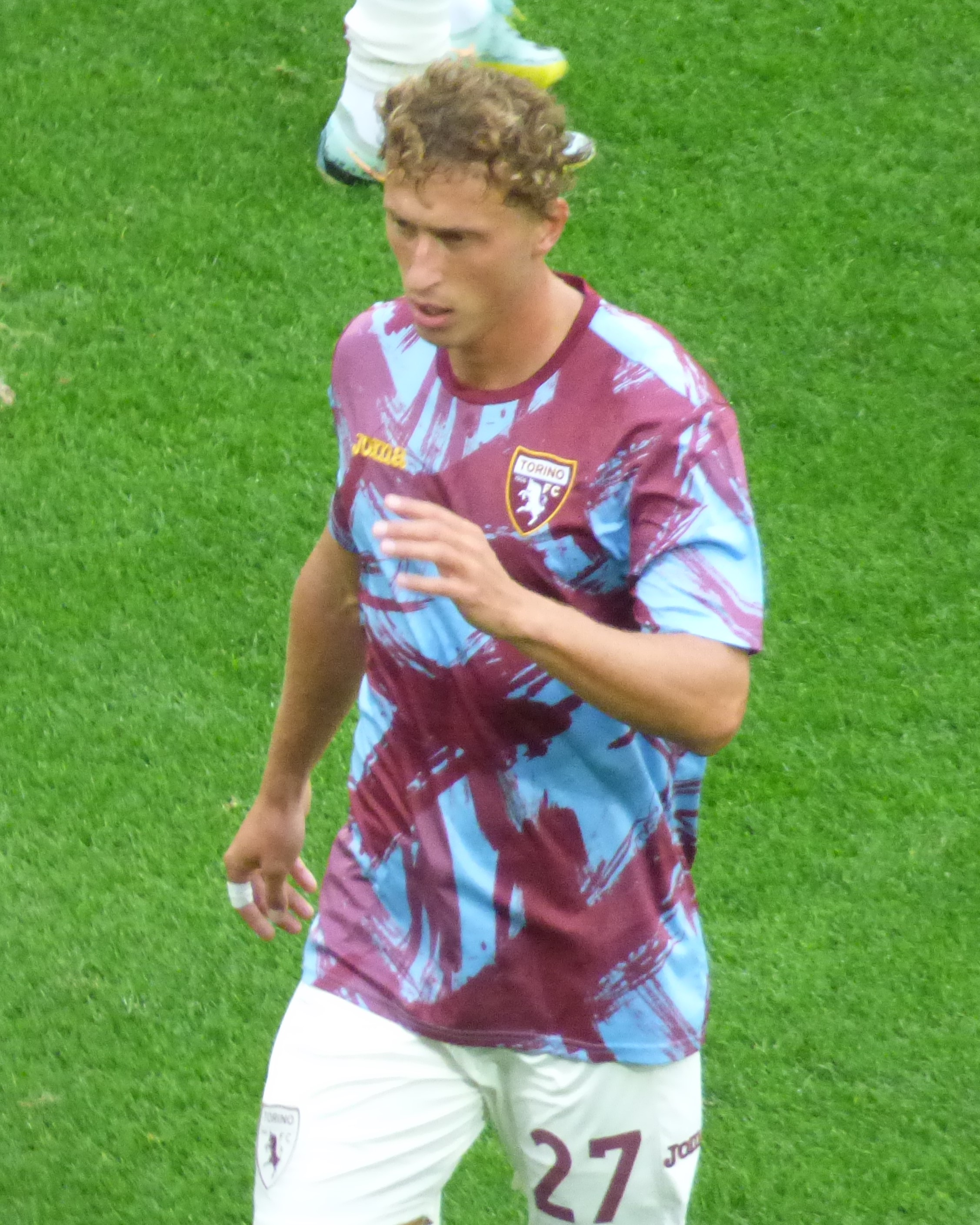
Mërgim Vojvoda is the most capped player in the history of Kosovo with 79 appearances.

Rank	Player	Caps	Goals	Pos.	Career
1	**Mërgim Vojvoda**	79	3	DF	2017–present
2	**Vedat Muriqi**	71	33	FW	2016–present
3	**Milot Rashica**	67	12	FW	2016–present
3	Amir Rrahmani	67	7	DF	2014–2026
5	Fidan Aliti	64	1	DF	2017–2026
6	**Arijanet Muric**	53	0	GK	2018–present
7	Valon Berisha	52	4	MF	2016–2026
8	**Edon Zhegrova**	50	6	MF	2018–present
9	Florent Hadergjonaj	39	1	DF	2019–2026
10	**Bersant Celina**	38	2	MF	2014–present

=== Longest career length ===
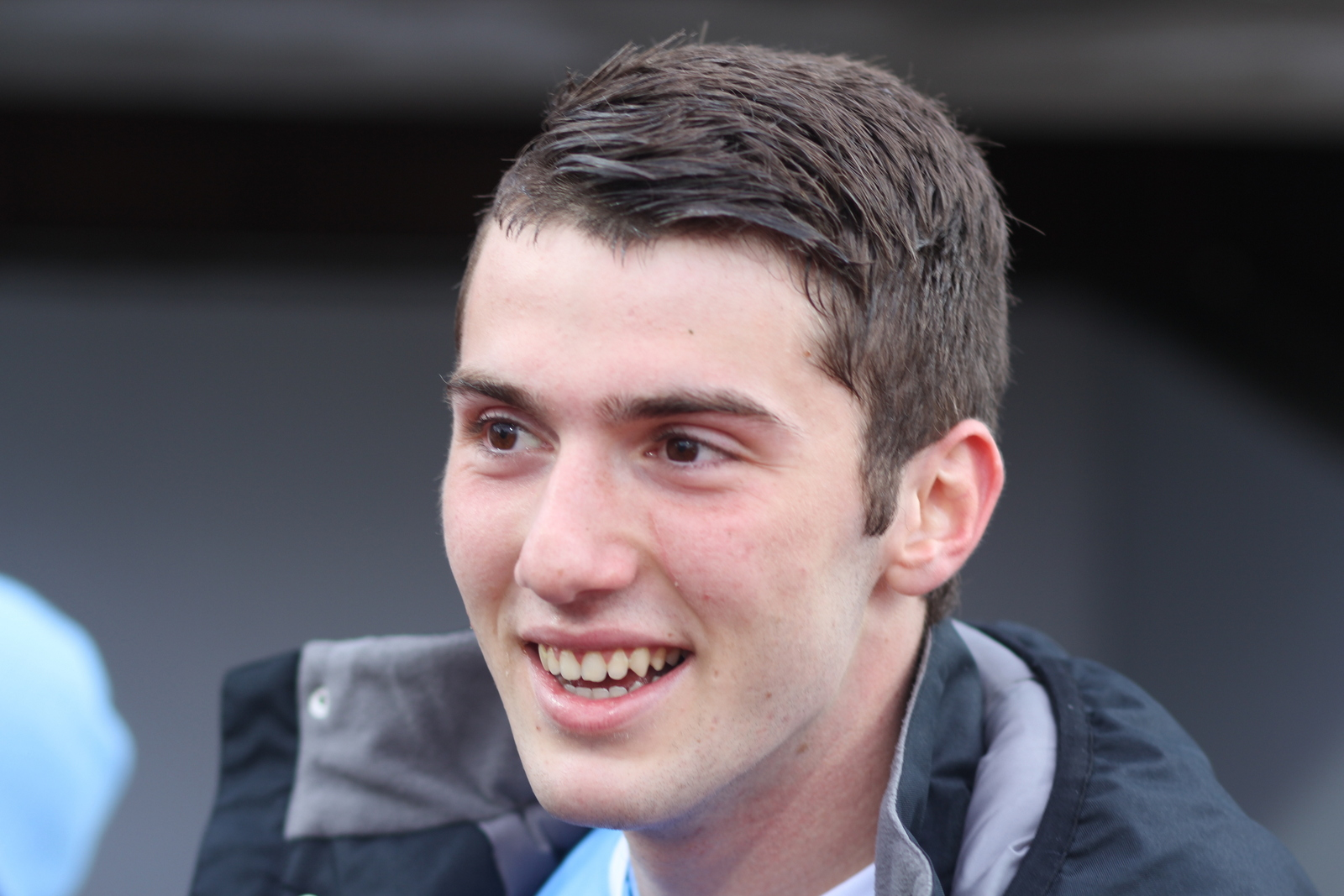
Zymer Bytyqi is the second-youngest player to represent Kosovo and is also noted for having the third-longest career with the national team.

As of 15 November 2025

Name	Career length	First cap		Last cap	
Name	Career length	Opponent	Date	Opponent	Date
**Amir Rrahmani**	11 years, 5 months and 3 weeks	Senegal	25 May 2014	Slovenia	15 November 2025
**Leart Paqarada**	10 years, 11 months, 4 weeks and 1 day	Oman	7 September 2014	Switzerland	5 September 2025
**Zymer Bytyqi**	10 years, 8 months, 1 week and 6 days	Haiti	5 March 2014	Lithuania	18 November 2024

=== Youngest players on debut ===
Nine players made their debut for Kosovo before turning 19, four of them under 18. Several players were not yet of age on their debut. Among these youngest debutants, some have gone on to become regular internationals, scoring goals and achieving notable careers. This table lists the youngest players to appear for the Kosovo national football team, including their age at debut, positions, caps, goals, opponents, and debut dates.

Player	Pos.	Date of birth	Age at debut	Opponent	Date
(Germany) Enis Bunjaki	FW	17 October 1997	16 years, 7 months, 1 week and 1 day	Senegal	25 May 2014
**Erblin Osmani**	MF	19 May 2009	17 years, 4 months and 5 days	Republic of Ireland	24 September 2026
Zymer Bytyqi	MF	11 September 1996	17 years, 5 months, 3 weeks and 1 day	Haiti	5 March 2014
**Bersant Celina**	MF	9 September 1996	17 years, 11 months, 4 weeks and 1 day	Oman	7 September 2014
Julian Bibleka	GK	4 May 1996	18 years and 3 weeks	Senegal	25 May 2014
Eliot Bujupi	FW	3 July 2006	18 years, 2 months and 6 days	Cyprus	9 September 2024
**Visar Bekaj**	GK	24 May 1997	18 years, 5 months, 2 weeks and 6 days	Albania	13 November 2015
Lirim R. Kastrati	DF	2 February 1999	18 years, 8 months and 1 week	Iceland	9 October 2017
**Edon Zhegrova**	MF	31 March 1999	18 years, 11 months, 3 weeks and 3 days	Madagascar	24 March 2018
**Ismet Lushaku**	MF	22 September 2000	19 years, 3 months and 3 weeks	Sweden	12 January 2020

=== Oldest players ===
==== Oldest players on debut ====
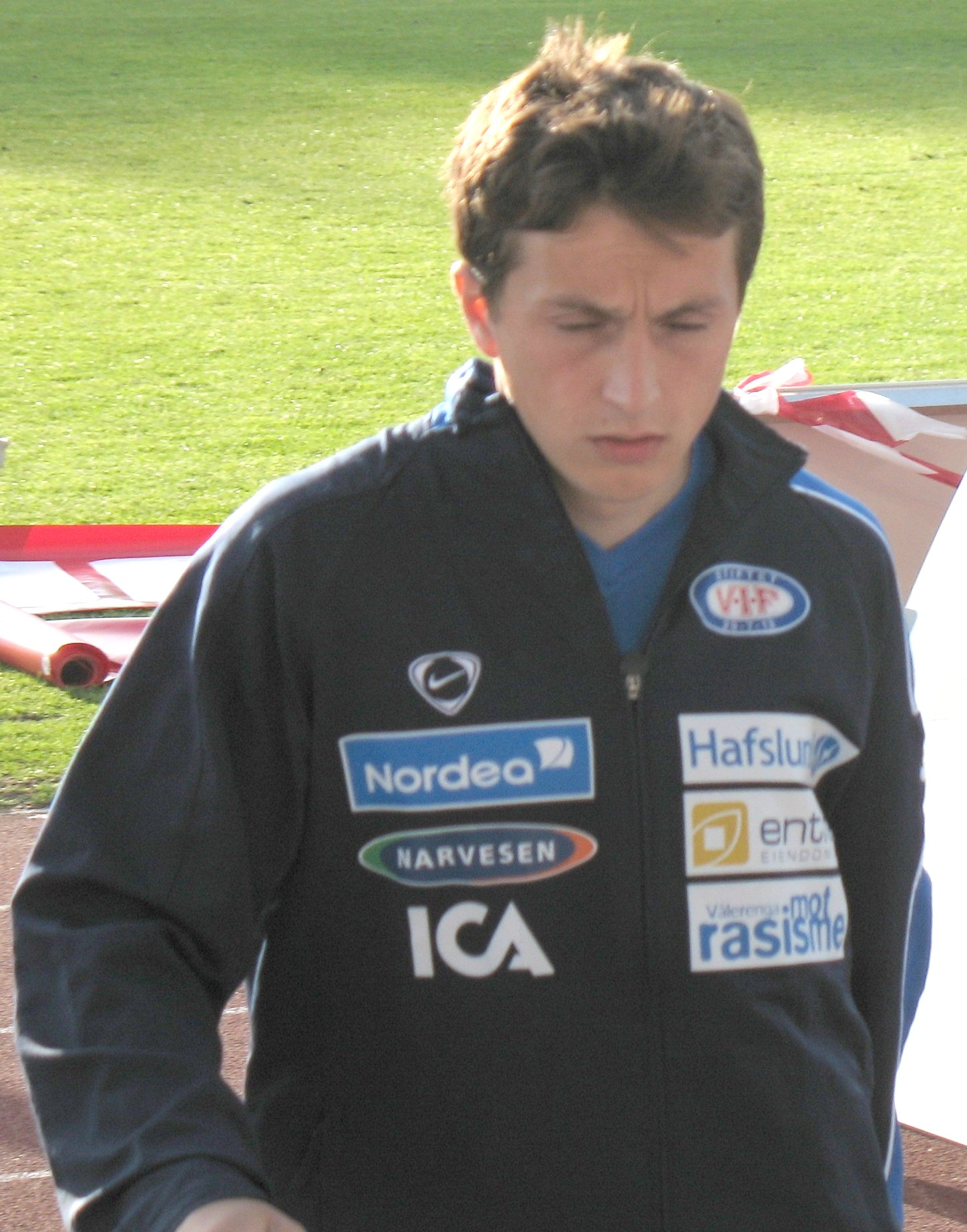
Ardian Gashi is the oldest player to have debuted for the Kosovo national team.

This list includes the oldest players to make their debut for the Kosovo national football team.

Player	Pos.	Date of birth	Age at debut	Opponent	Date
Ardian Gashi	MF	20 June 1981	32 years, 8 months, 1 week and 6 days	Haiti	5 March 2014
(Albania) Debatik Curri	DF	28 December 1983	30 years, 4 months, 3 weeks and 2 days	Turkey	21 May 2014
Albert Bunjaku	FW	29 November 1983	30 years, 3 months and 5 days	Haiti	5 March 2014
Besart Berisha	FW	29 July 1985	31 years, 7 months, 3 weeks and 3 days	Finland	24 March 2017
Adis Nurković	GK	28 April 1986	31 years, 1 month and 2 weeks	Turkey	11 June 2017
Alban Meha	MF	26 April 1986	30 years, 4 months, 1 week and 3 days	Finland	5 September 2016
Lapidar Lladrovci	DF	15 December 1990	29 years and 4 weeks	Sweden	12 January 2020
Besar Musolli	MF	28 February 1989	28 years, 7 months, 1 week and 1 day	Ukraine	6 October 2017

==== Oldest players at last match ====
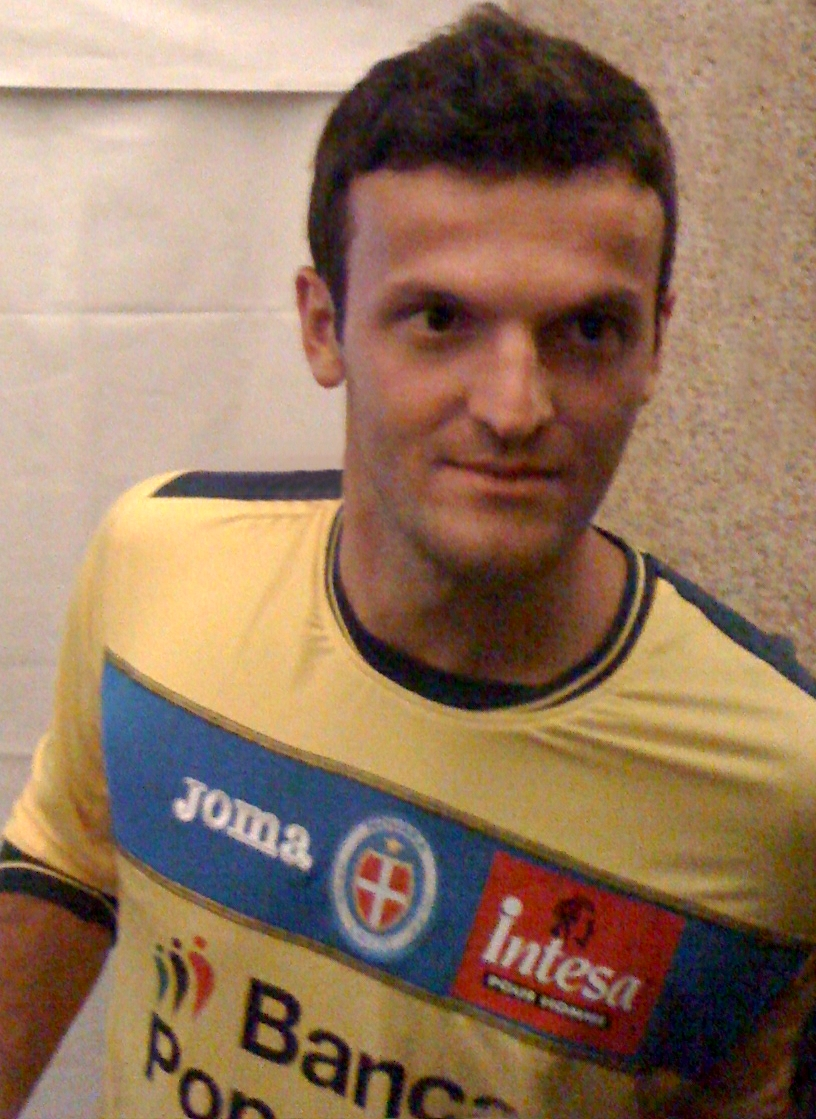
Samir Ujkani is the oldest player to have appeared for the Kosovo national team.

This list includes the oldest players to appear for the Kosovo national football team.

Player	Pos.	Date of birth	Age at last match	Opponent	Date
Samir Ujkani	GK	5 July 1988	34 years, 2 months, 3 weeks and 1 day	Cyprus	27 September 2022
Shpëtim Hasani	FW	10 August 1982	33 years, 3 months and 3 days	Albania	13 November 2015
Ardian Gashi	MF	20 June 1981	33 years, 2 months, 2 weeks and 4 days	Oman	7 September 2014
Albert Bunjaku	FW	29 November 1983	32 years, 10 months and 1 week	Croatia	6 October 2016
**Valon Berisha**	MF	7 February 1993	32 years, 8 months and 3 days	Slovenia	10 October 2025
Bernard Berisha	MF	24 October 1991	32 years, 7 months, 1 week and 5 days	Norway	5 June 2024
Kristian Nushi	MF	21 July 1982	32 years, 1 month, 2 weeks and 3 days	Oman	7 September 2014
**Fidan Aliti**	DF	3 October 1993	32 years and 1 week	Slovenia	10 October 2025
Enis Alushi	MF	22 December 1985	31 years, 8 months and 2 weeks	Finland	5 September 2017
Besart Berisha	FW	29 July 1985	31 years, 7 months, 3 weeks and 3 days	Iceland	24 March 2017

=== Captains ===
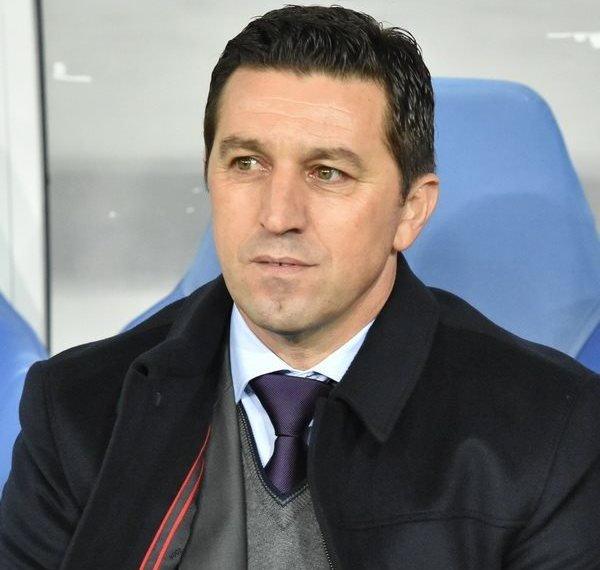
Besnik Hasi is the oldest player to have capitened the Kosovo national team.

This list includes players who have captained the Kosovo national football team, ranked from the oldest to the youngest.

Player	Pos.	Date of birth	Age at first captaincy	Opponent	Date
Besnik Hasi	DF	29 December 1971	35 years, 5 months, 2 weeks and 3 days	Saudi Arabia	15 June 2007
Genc Hoxha	—N/a	15 September 1957	35 years, 4 months, 4 weeks and 2 days	Albania	14 February 1993
**Mërgim Vojvoda**	DF	1 February 1995	30 years, 4 months and 5 days	Armenia	6 June 2025
Enis Alushi	MF	22 December 1985	28 years, 5 months and 3 days	Senegal	25 May 2014
**Vedat Muriqi**	FW	24 April 1994	28 years and 5 months	Northern Ireland	24 September 2022
Herolind Shala	MF	1 February 1992	27 years, 1 month, 2 weeks and 6 days	Denmark	21 March 2019
Samir Ujkani	GK	5 July 1988	27 years, 3 months and 5 days	Equatorial Guinea	10 October 2015
**Fidan Aliti**	DF	3 October 1993	26 years, 3 months, 1 week and 2 days	Sweden	12 January 2020
Hekuran Kryeziu	MF	12 February 1993	26 years, 1 month, 1 week and 6 days	Bulgaria	25 March 2019
**Amir Rrahmani**	DF	24 February 1994	25 years, 3 months and 2 weeks	Montenegro	7 June 2019
**Valon Berisha**	MF	7 February 1993	25 years, 9 months, 1 week and 6 days	Azerbaijan	20 November 2018
Anel Rashkaj	MF	19 August 1989	24 years, 6 months and 2 weeks	Haiti	5 March 2014
Florian Loshaj	MF	13 August 1996	24 years, 9 months, 4 weeks and 1 day	Gambia	11 June 2021
**Visar Bekaj**	GK	24 May 1997	24 years, 2 weeks and 1 day	Guinea	8 June 2021
Lirim R. Kastrati	FW	2 February 1999	23 years, 9 months, 2 weeks and 3 days	Faroe Islands	19 November 2022

=== Competitive players records ===
Most appearances in competitive matches (World Cup, European Championships, Nations League and qualifiers)
Amir Rrahmani (2014–present), 52
Mërgim Vojvoda (2017–present), 52
Vedat Muriqi (2016–present), 51
Milot Rashica (2016–present), 50

Most appearances at the FIFA World Cup qualifiers
Vedat Muriqi & Milot Rashica, 18

Most appearances at the UEFA European Championship qualifying
Arijanet Muriqi, Mërgim Vojvoda & Fidan Aliti, 17

Most appearances in the UEFA Nations League
Amir Rrahmani 22

== Goals ==
=== Top goalscorers ===
As of 4 October 2026

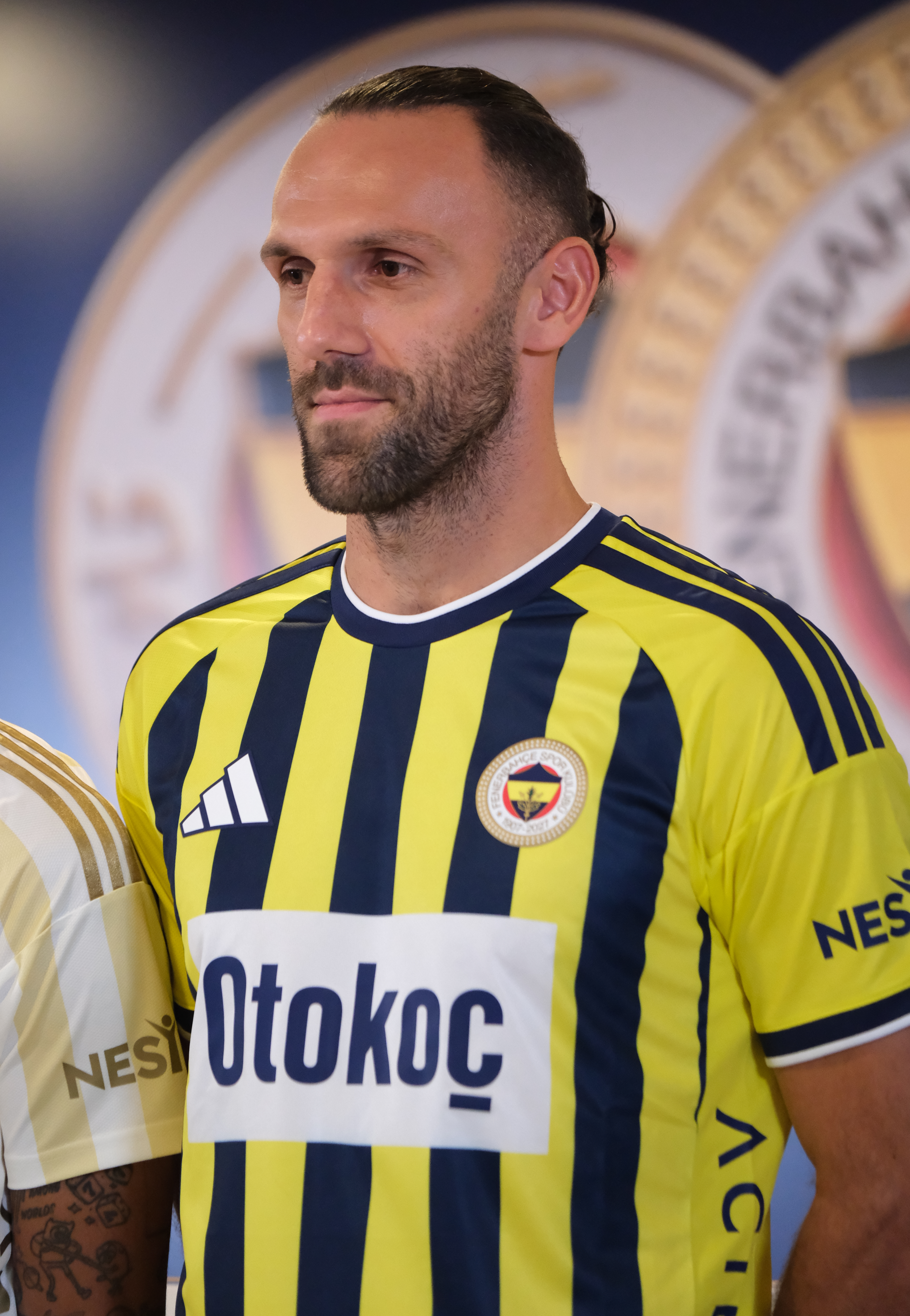
Vedat Muriqi is the top scorer in the history of Kosovo with 33 goals.

Rank	Player	Goals	Caps	Ratio	Career
1	Vedat Muriqi	33	71	0.46	2016–present
2	Milot Rashica	12	67	0.18	2016–present
3	Arbër Zeneli	9	33	0.27	2016–present
4	Albion Rrahmani	7	26	0.27	2023–present
4	Amir Rrahmani	7	67	0.1	2014–2026
6	Edon Zhegrova	6	50	0.12	2018–present
7	Fisnik Asllani	5	20	0.25	2024–present
7	Elbasan Rashani	5	29	0.17	2016–2024
9	Benjamin Kololli	4	24	0.17	2016–2022
9	Valon Berisha	4	52	0.08	2016–2026

=== Youngest goalscorers ===
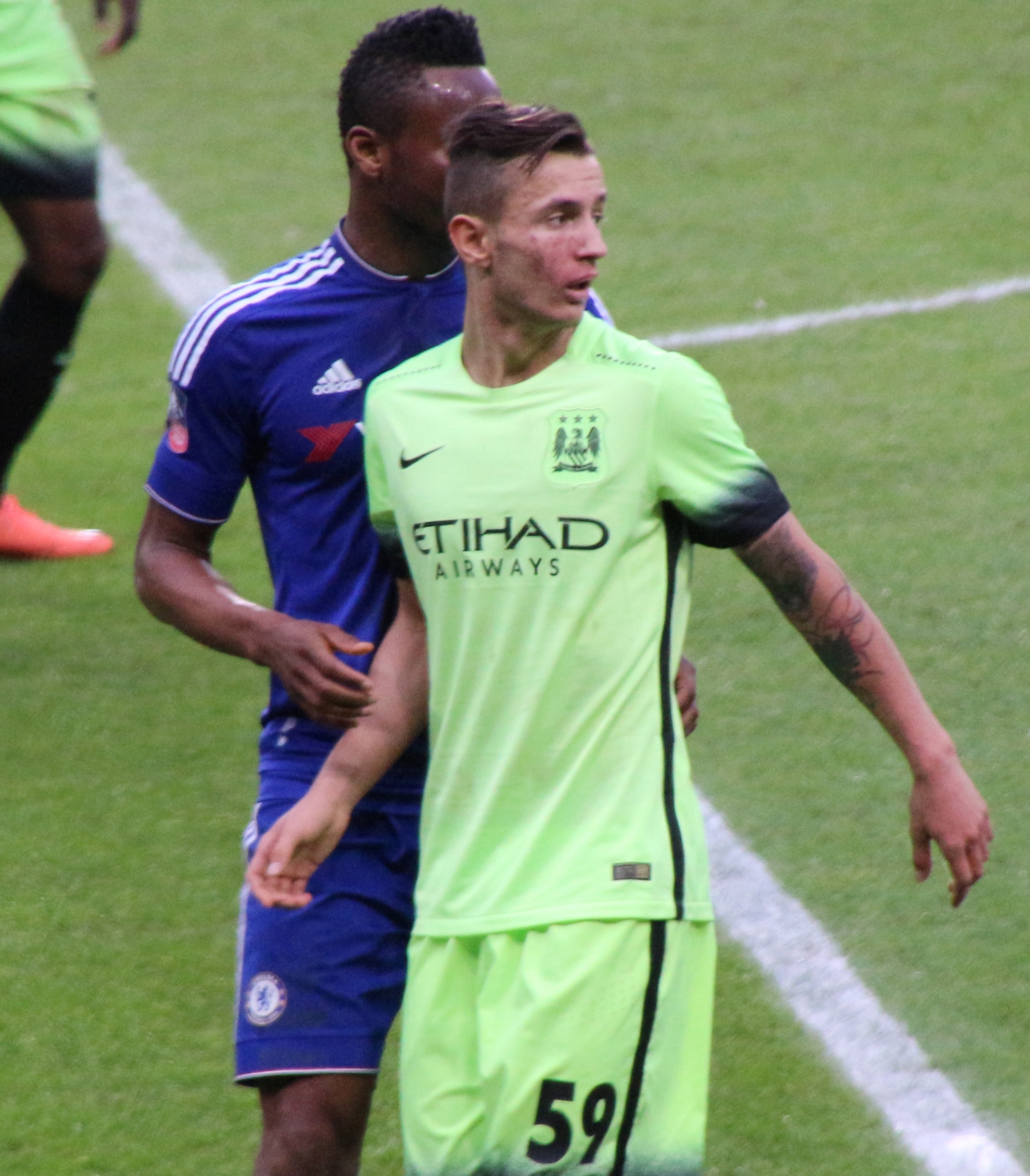
Bersant Celina is the youngest player to have scored for the Kosovo national team.

This list includes the five youngest players to have scored their first goal for the Kosovo national football team.

Player	Pos.	Date of birth	Age at first goal	Opponent	Date
Bersant Celina	MF	9 September 1996	19 years, 2 months and 4 days	Albania	13 November 2015
Lirim M. Kastrati	FW	16 January 1999	21 years, 10 months and 2 days	Moldova	18 November 2020
Imran Bunjaku	MF	18 October 1992	21 years, 10 months, 2 weeks and 6 days	Oman	7 September 2014
Donis Avdijaj	FW	25 August 1996	22 years, 2 months, 3 weeks and 2 days	Malta	17 November 2018
Elbasan Rashani	FW	9 May 1993	22 years, 6 months and 4 days	Albania	13 November 2015

=== Oldest goalscorers ===
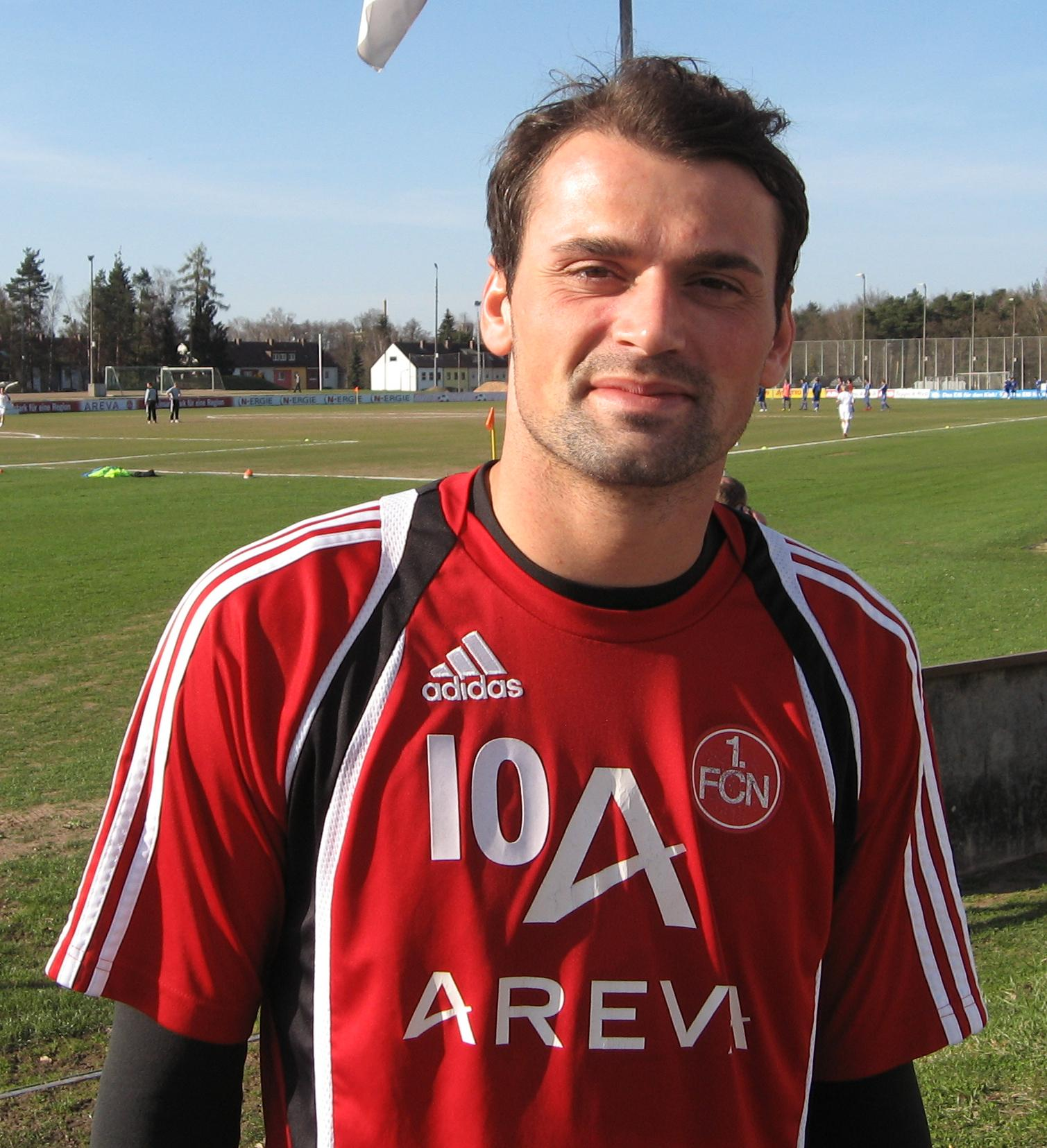
Bersant Celina is the oldest player to have scored for the Kosovo national team.

This list includes the five oldest players to have scored their first goal for the Kosovo national football team.

Player	Pos.	Date of birth	Age at first goal	Opponent	Date
Albert Bunjaku	FW	29 November 1983	30 years, 5 months, 3 weeks and 1 day	Turkey	21 May 2014
Bernard Berisha	MF	24 October 1991	28 years, 10 months, 1 week and 6 days	Greece	6 September 2020
Fidan Aliti	DF	3 October 1993	28 years, 5 months and 3 weeks	Burkina Faso	24 March 2022
Atdhe Nuhiu	FW	29 July 1989	27 years, 7 months, 3 weeks and 3 days	Iceland	24 March 2017
Benjamin Kololli	MF	15 May 1992	26 years, 4 months, 3 weeks and 5 days	Malta	11 October 2018

=== Hat-tricks ===
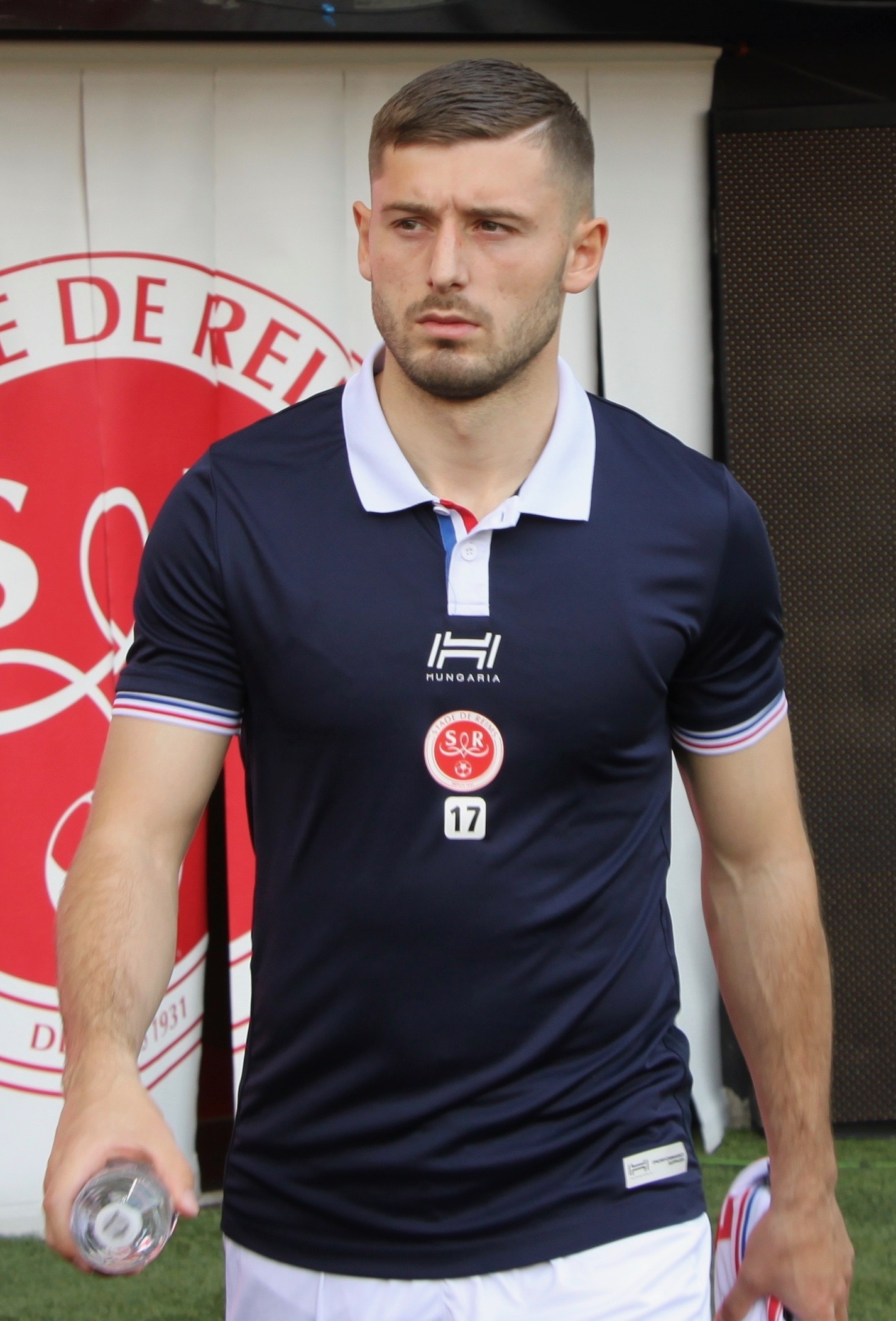
Arbër Zeneli is the first player to score a hat-trick for the Kosovo national team.

Player	Date	Venue	Opponent	Score	Result	Competition
Arbër Zeneli	20 November 2018	Fadil Vokrri Stadium, Pristina, Kosovo	Azerbaijan	1–0 2–0 4–0	4–0	UEFA Euro 2020 qualification
Vedat Muriqi	1 June 2021	Fadil Vokrri Stadium, Pristina, Kosovo	San Marino	1–0 2–0 3–0 4–0	4–1	Friendly
Vedat Muriqi	23 March 2025	Nueva Condomina, Murcia, Spain	Iceland	1–1 2–1 3–1	3–1	2024–25 UEFA Nations League play-offs
Albion Rrahmani	9 June 2025	Fadil Vokrri Stadium, Pristina, Kosovo	Comoros	1–1 2–1 3–1	4–2	Friendly

=== Best goal ratio ===
This table lists Kosovo national team players ranked by their goals-to-caps ratio.

Player	Goals	Caps	Ratio
Mërgim Brahimi	2	2	1
Vedat Muriqi	32	64	0.5
Albert Bunjaku	3	6	0.5
(Switzerland) Uran Bislimi	1	2	0.5
Muhamet Hyseni	1	2	0.5
Donis Avdijaj	2	6	0.33
Imran Bunjaku	1	3	0.33
(Albania) Arbër Hoxha	1	3	0.33
Arb Manaj	1	3	0.33
Altin Zeqiri	1	3	0.33

== Team results ==
=== Biggest wins ===
22 April 2006 Friendly	Monaco	1–7	Kosovo	Cap d'Ail, France
	unknown (??)	Report (1st); Report (2nd)	Zeka 15'; Emra 17', 65'; Gashi 29'; Keqi 75'; Llumnica 82'; Idrizi 83'	Stadium: Cap d'Ail Stadium

24 March 2022 Friendly	Kosovo	5–0	Burkina Faso	Pristina, Kosovo
18:00	Aliti 3'; Selmani 23'; Vojvoda 53'; Rashica 68'; Domgjoni 75'	Report		Stadium: Fadil Vokrri Stadium; Referee: Eldorjan Hamiti (Albania)

17 November 2018 2018–19 UEFA Nations League	Malta	0–5	Kosovo	Ta' Qali, Malta
18:00 (UTC+1)		Report	Muriqi 15'; Kololli 70'; Avdijaj 78', 80'; Rashica 86'	Stadium: National Stadium; Referee: Bartosz Frankowski (Poland)

=== Highest-scoring draws ===
13 November 2015 Friendly	Kosovo	2–2	Albania	Pristina, Kosovo
14:00 UTC+1	Celina 58' (pen.); Rashani 69'	Report	Manaj 54'; Rrahmani 73'	Stadium: Pristina City Stadium; Attendance: 38,000 (record); Referee: Lorenc Jemini (Albania)

21 March 2019 Friendly	Kosovo	2–2	Denmark	Pristina, Kosovo
19:00 (UTC+1)	Rrahmani 42'; Celina 66'	Report	Eriksen 63' (pen.); Højbjerg 90+1'	Stadium: Fadil Vokrri Stadium; Attendance: 13,000; Referee: Ali Palabıyık (Turkey)

16 November 2022 Friendly	Kosovo	2–2	Armenia	Pristina, Kosovo
18:00	L. M. Kastrati 67' (pen.); Rrudhani 90+3'	Report	Shaghoyan 24'; K. Hovhannisyan 82'	Stadium: Fadil Vokrri Stadium; Attendance: 2,000; Referee: Eldorjan Hamiti (Albania)

9 September 2023 UEFA Euro 2024 qualifying	Kosovo	2–2	Switzerland	Pristina, Kosovo
20:45	Muriqi 65', 90+4'	Report	Freuler 14', 79'	Stadium: Fadil Vokrri Stadium; Attendance: 12,700; Referee: Jakob Kehlet (Denmark)

=== Biggest defeats ===
21 May 2014 Friendly	Kosovo	1–6	Turkey	Mitrovica, Kosovo
16:00 GMT	A. Bunjaku 35'	Report	Özek 2'; Kısa 34'; Şahan 49'; Pektemek 54', 71'; Potuk 86' (pen.)	Stadium: Adem Jashari Olympic Stadium; Attendance: 17,000; Referee: Bardhyl Pashaj (Albania)

6 October 2016 2018 FIFA World Cup qualification	Kosovo	0–6	Croatia	Shkodër, Albania (Note: After stadiums in Mitrovica and Pristina were under renovation and do not meet UEFA standards. Kosovo played the qualifying matches of the 2018 FIFA World Cup in Loro Boriçi Stadium (Albanian: Stadiumi Loro Boriçi), a multi-use stadium in Shkodër, Albania.)
20:45 UTC+1		Report (FIFA); Report (UEFA)	Mandžukić 6', 24', 35'; Mitrović 68'; Perišić 83'; N. Kalinić 90+2'	Stadium: Loro Boriçi Stadium; Attendance: 14,612; Referee: David Fernández Borbalán (Spain)

== Match statistics ==
As of 4 October 2026

=== Opponents to continental federations ===
This table shows Kosovo's head-to-head record aggregated by continental football association and non-FIFA teams.

Continental Association		Pld	W	D	L	GF	GA	GD	Win %
UEFA	Europe	77	31	16	30	104	108	−4	40.26
AFC	Asia	3	2	0	1	2	2	+0	66.67
CAF	Africa	6	5	0	1	16	5	+11	83.33
CONCACAF	North and Central America	1	0	1	0	0	0	+0	0.00
ConIFA	Non-FIFA	2	1	1	0	4	2	+2	50.00
CONMEBOL	South America	0	0	0	0	0	0	+0	—
Total		110	45	23	42	162	146	+16	40.91

=== Match type ===
Tournament	Pld	W	D	L	GF	GA	GD	Win %
Friendly matches	36	19	6	11	71	42	+29	52.78
FIFA World Cup qualifiers	25	5	5	15	18	47	−29	20.00
UEFA Nations League	30	15	6	9	48	29	+19	50.00
UEFA European Championship qualifying	19	5	7	7	24	28	−4	26.32
KTFF 50th Anniversary Cup	2	1	0	1	4	2	+2	50.00
Total	112	45	25	42	164	148	+16	40.18

=== All international matches ===
As of 4 October 2026 after the match against Austria.

Opponent	Pld	W	D	L	GF	GA	GD	Win %	Reference
1993–present
Albania	6	1	1	4	9	11	−2	16.67	H2H results
Andorra	3	2	1	0	7	1	+6	66.67	H2H results
Armenia	3	2	1	0	8	4	+4	66.67	H2H results
Austria	2	0	1	1	2	4	−2	0.00	
Azerbaijan	2	1	1	0	4	0	+4	50.00	H2H results
Belarus	2	0	0	2	1	3	−2	0.00	H2H results
Bulgaria	2	1	1	0	4	3	+1	50.00	H2H results
Burkina Faso	2	2	0	0	7	0	+7	100.00	H2H results
Comoros	1	1	0	0	4	2	+2	100.00	H2H results
Croatia	2	0	0	2	0	7	−7	0.00	H2H results
Cyprus	4	4	0	0	14	1	+13	100.00	H2H results
Czech Republic	3	1	0	2	4	5	−1	33.33	H2H results
Denmark	1	0	1	0	2	2	+0	0.00	H2H results
England	2	0	0	2	3	9	−6	0.00	H2H results
Equatorial Guinea	1	1	0	0	2	0	+2	100.00	H2H results
Faroe Islands	4	2	2	0	5	1	+4	50.00	H2H results
Finland	2	0	1	1	1	2	−1	0.00	H2H results
Gambia	1	1	0	0	1	0	+1	100.00	H2H results
Georgia	2	1	0	1	2	2	+0	50.00	H2H results
Gibraltar	1	1	0	0	1	0	+1	100.00	H2H results
Greece	6	0	3	3	3	7	−4	0.00	H2H results
Guinea	1	0	0	1	1	2	−1	0.00	H2H results
Haiti	1	0	1	0	0	0	+0	0.00	H2H results
Hungary	1	0	0	1	0	2	−2	0.00	H2H results
Iceland	4	2	0	2	6	6	+0	50.00	H2H results
Israel	3	1	2	0	2	1	+1	33.33	H2H results
Jordan	1	0	0	1	0	2	−2	0.00	H2H results
Latvia	1	1	0	0	4	3	+1	100.00	H2H results
Lithuania	3	3	0	0	7	1	+6	100.00	H2H results
Madagascar	1	1	0	0	1	0	+1	100.00	H2H results
Malta	3	3	0	0	10	2	+8	100.00	H2H results
Moldova	2	1	1	0	2	1	+1	50.00	H2H results
Monaco	1	1	0	0	7	1	+6	100.00	H2H results
Montenegro	2	1	1	0	3	1	+2	50.00	H2H results
North Macedonia	1	0	0	1	1	2	−1	0.00	H2H results
Northern Cyprus	1	0	0	1	0	1	−1	0.00	H2H results
Northern Ireland	2	1	0	1	4	4	+0	50.00	H2H results
Norway	1	0	0	1	0	3	−3	0.00	H2H results
Oman	1	1	0	0	1	0	+1	100.00	H2H results
Republic of Ireland	1	1	0	0	1	0	+1	100.00	H2H results
Romania	4	0	1	3	0	8	−8	0.00	H2H results
San Marino	1	1	0	0	4	1	+3	100.00	H2H results
Sápmi	1	1	0	0	4	1	+3	100.00	
Saudi Arabia	1	1	0	0	1	0	+1	100.00	H2H results
Senegal	1	0	0	1	1	3	−2	0.00	H2H results
Slovakia	1	1	0	0	4	3	+1	100.00	H2H results
Slovenia	4	1	1	2	3	3	+0	25.00	H2H results
Spain	2	0	0	2	1	5	−4	0.00	H2H results
Sweden	5	2	0	3	3	7	−4	40.00	H2H results
Switzerland	5	0	4	1	5	9	−4	0.00	H2H results
Turkey	4	0	0	4	2	13	−11	0.00	H2H results H2H results*
Ukraine	2	0	0	2	0	5	−5	0.00	H2H results
50 countries	111	45	24	42	163	147	+16	40.54	All H2H results

== Venues ==
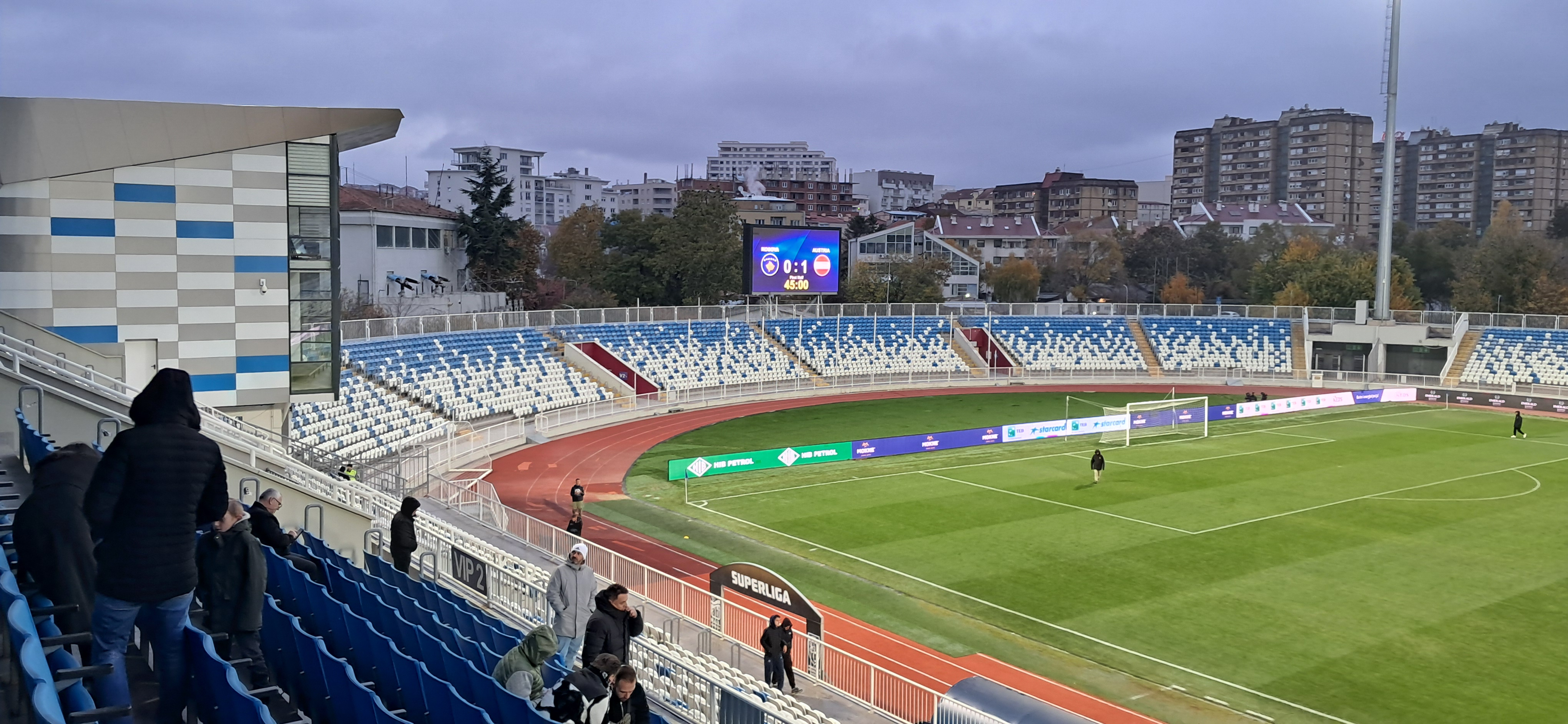
Fadil Vokrri Stadium

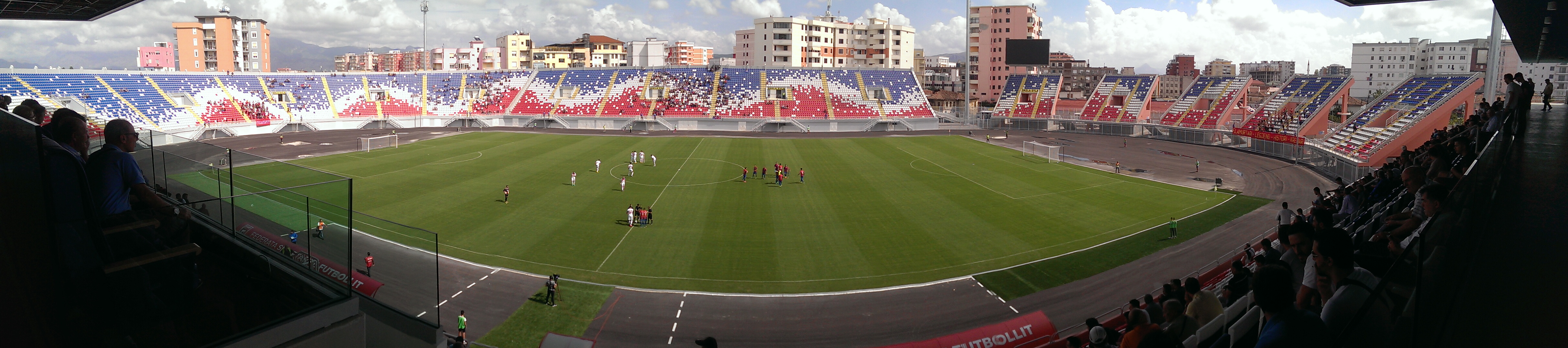
Loro Boriçi Stadium

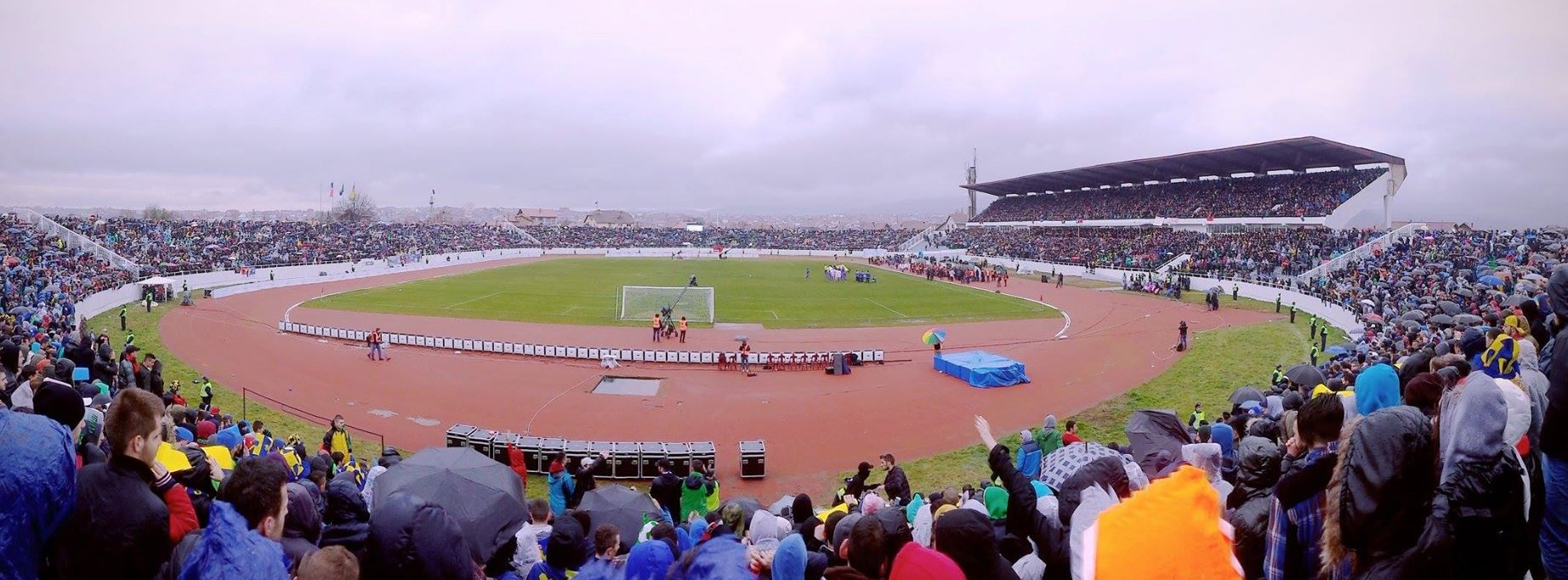
Adem Jashari Olympic Stadium

Kosovo's home stadium is the Fadil Vokrri Stadium. The stadium capacity is 13,500, which makes it the second largest national stadium in Kosovo. Kosovo's previous national stadium was the Adem Jashari Olympic Stadium which is currently under renovation. Kosovo also used Loro Boriçi Stadium during the 2018 FIFA World Cup qualifying campaign, and this happened after the two stadiums in Pristina and Mitrovica at that time were under renovation and do not meet UEFA standards. On 12 July 2019, the construction of Kosovo National Stadium began, and two days later the project of this stadium was presented which would have a capacity of 30,000 seats, but after the presentation, the construction was suspended for political reasons related to the location.

As of 24 September 2026

Kosovo national football team home stadiums
Stadium	Capacity	Location	Pld	W	D	L	Win %	First match		Last match		UEFA category	Ref
Stadium	Capacity	Location	Pld	W	D	L	Win %	Opponent	Date	Opponent	Date	UEFA category	Ref
Fadil Vokrri Stadium	13,500	Pristina, Kosovo	48	23	12	13	47.92	Yugoslavia	8 November 1967	Republic of Ireland	24 September 2026	4/4 stars	
Loro Boriçi Stadium	16,000	Shkodër, Albania	5	0	0	5	0.00	Croatia	6 October 2016	Ukraine	6 October 2017	4/4 stars	
Adem Jashari Olympic Stadium	18,500	Mitrovica, Kosovo	3	1	1	1	33.33	Haiti	5 March 2014	Latvia	13 November 2017	2/4 stars	

== Competitive record ==
=== FIFA World Cup ===
On 9 June 2016, the UEFA Emergency Panel decided that Kosovo would join Croatia, Finland, Iceland, Turkey and Ukraine in Group I, and also decided that Bosnia and Herzegovina and Serbia should not play against Kosovo for security reasons. On 5 September 2016, Kosovo made its debut in FIFA World Cup qualification with a 1–1 away draw against Finland, with Kosovo's equalizing goal being scored by newcomer Valon Berisha from a penalty kick in the 60th minute. On 2 September 2021, Kosovo achieved their first win in the FIFA World Cup qualifications a 1–0 away win against Georgia.

FIFA World Cup record										Qualification record						
Year	Round	Pos	Pld	W	D	L	GF	GA	Squad	Pos.	Pld	W	D	L	GF	GA
(Uruguay) 1930 to (France) 1938	Part of Kingdom of Yugoslavia									Part of Kingdom of Yugoslavia						
(Brazil) 1950 to (Italy) 1990	Part of SFR Yugoslavia									Part of SFR Yugoslavia						
(United States) 1994 to (France) 1998	Part of FR Yugoslavia									Part of FR Yugoslavia						
(South Korea) (Japan) 2002 to (Germany) 2006	Not a FIFA member, under UNMIK									Not a FIFA member, under UNMIK						
(South Africa) 2010	Not a FIFA member									Not a FIFA member						
(Brazil) 2014	Not a FIFA member									Not a FIFA member						
(Russia) 2018	Did not qualify									6th	10	0	1	9	3	24
(Qatar) 2022	Did not qualify									5th	8	1	2	5	5	15
(Canada) (Mexico) (United States) 2026	Did not qualify									2nd (PO)	8	4	2	2	10	9
(Morocco) (Portugal) (Spain) 2030 (Note: Additional matches are scheduled to be played in Argentina, Paraguay, and Uruguay in commemoration of the 100th anniversary of the first world cup, however they are not considered to be official hosts of the tournament.)	To be determined															
(Saudi Arabia) 2034	To be determined															
Total	—	0/2	0	0	0	0	0	0	—	3/3	26	5	5	16	18	48

=== UEFA European Championship ===
On 2 December 2018, in Dublin, it was decided that Kosovo should be part in Group A of the UEFA Euro 2020 qualifying, together with Bulgaria, Czech Republic, Montenegro and 2018 World Cup fourth place finisher England. On 25 March 2019, Kosovo made their debut on UEFA European Championship qualifying with a 1–1 home draw against Bulgaria and the draw goal was scored by Arbër Zeneli on the 61st minute. On 11 June 2019, Kosovo won their first qualifying match for a major tournament by defeating Bulgaria 3–2.

UEFA European Championship record										Qualification record						
Year	Round	Pos	Pld	W	D	L	GF	GA	Squad	Pos	Pld	W	D	L	GF	GA
(France) 1960 to (Sweden) 1992	Part of SFR Yugoslavia									Part of SFR Yugoslavia						
(England) 1996	Part of FR Yugoslavia									Part of FR Yugoslavia						
(Belgium) (Netherlands) 2000 to (Portugal) 2004	Not a UEFA member, under UNMIK									Not a UEFA member, under UNMIK						
(Austria) (Switzerland) 2008	Not a UEFA member									Not a UEFA member						
(Poland) (Ukraine) 2012	Not a UEFA member									Not a UEFA member						
(France) 2016	Not a UEFA member									Not a UEFA member						
(Europe) 2020	Did not qualify									3rd (PO)	9	3	2	4	14	18
(Germany) 2024	Did not qualify									5th	10	2	5	3	10	10
(England) (Scotland) (Republic of Ireland) (Wales) 2028	To be determined									To be determined						
(Italy) (Turkey) 2032	To be determined									To be determined						
Total	—	0/2	0	0	0	0	0	0	—	2/2	19	5	7	7	24	28

=== UEFA Nations League ===
Kosovo's Nations League record
First match	Azerbaijan 0–0 Kosovo (Baku, Azerbaijan; 7 September 2018)
Biggest win	Malta 0–5 Kosovo (Ta' Qali, Malta; 17 November 2018)
Biggest defeat	Kosovo 0–3 Romania (Pristina, Kosovo; 6 September 2024)
Best result	38th place in 2024–25
Worst result	44th place in 2020–21

On 24 January 2018, in Lausanne, it was decided that Kosovo should be part of League D in Group 3 of the 2018–19 UEFA Nations League, together with Azerbaijan, Faroe Islands and Malta. On 7 September 2018, Kosovo made their debut in the UEFA Nations League with a 0–0 away draw against Azerbaijan. On 10 September 2018, Kosovo achieved their first win in the UEFA Nations League, which was also the team's first-ever competitive win, a 2–0 home win against the Faroe Islands. Kosovo finished the league unbeaten (with four wins and two draws) and will be promoted to the next tier (C league) for the next edition.

UEFA Nations League record
League phase												Finals								
Season	LG	Grp	Pos.	Pld	W	D	L	GF	GA	P/R	RK	Year	Pos.	Pld	W	D	L	GF	GA	Squad
2018–19	D	3	1st	6	4	2	0	15	2	▲	42nd	(Portugal) 2019	Did not qualify							
2020–21	C	3	3rd	6	1	2	3	4	6	Same position	44th	(Italy) 2021	Did not qualify							
2022–23	C	2	2nd	6	3	0	3	11	8	Same position	39th	(Netherlands) 2023	Did not qualify							
2024–25	C	2	2nd	8	6	0	2	15	9	▲	38th	(Germany) 2025	Did not qualify							
2026–27	B	3	2nd	4	1	2	1	3	4	TBD	TBD	2027	Did not qualify							
Total				30	15	6	9	48	29	38th		Total		0	0	0	0	0	0	—

=== Non-FIFA Tournament ===
Kosovo for first time after the Kosovo War participated in a tournament held to celebrate the 50th anniversary of the Cyprus Turkish Football Association. Kosovo lost against the host with result 1–0 and won against Sàpmi with result 4–1.

Year	Round	Pos.	Pld	W	D	L	GF	GA	Squad
(Northern Cyprus) KTFF 50th Anniversary Cup	Runners-up	2nd	2	1	0	1	4	2	Squad
Total	Runners-up	1/1	2	1	0	1	4	2	—
