= List of international goals scored by Vedat Muriqi =

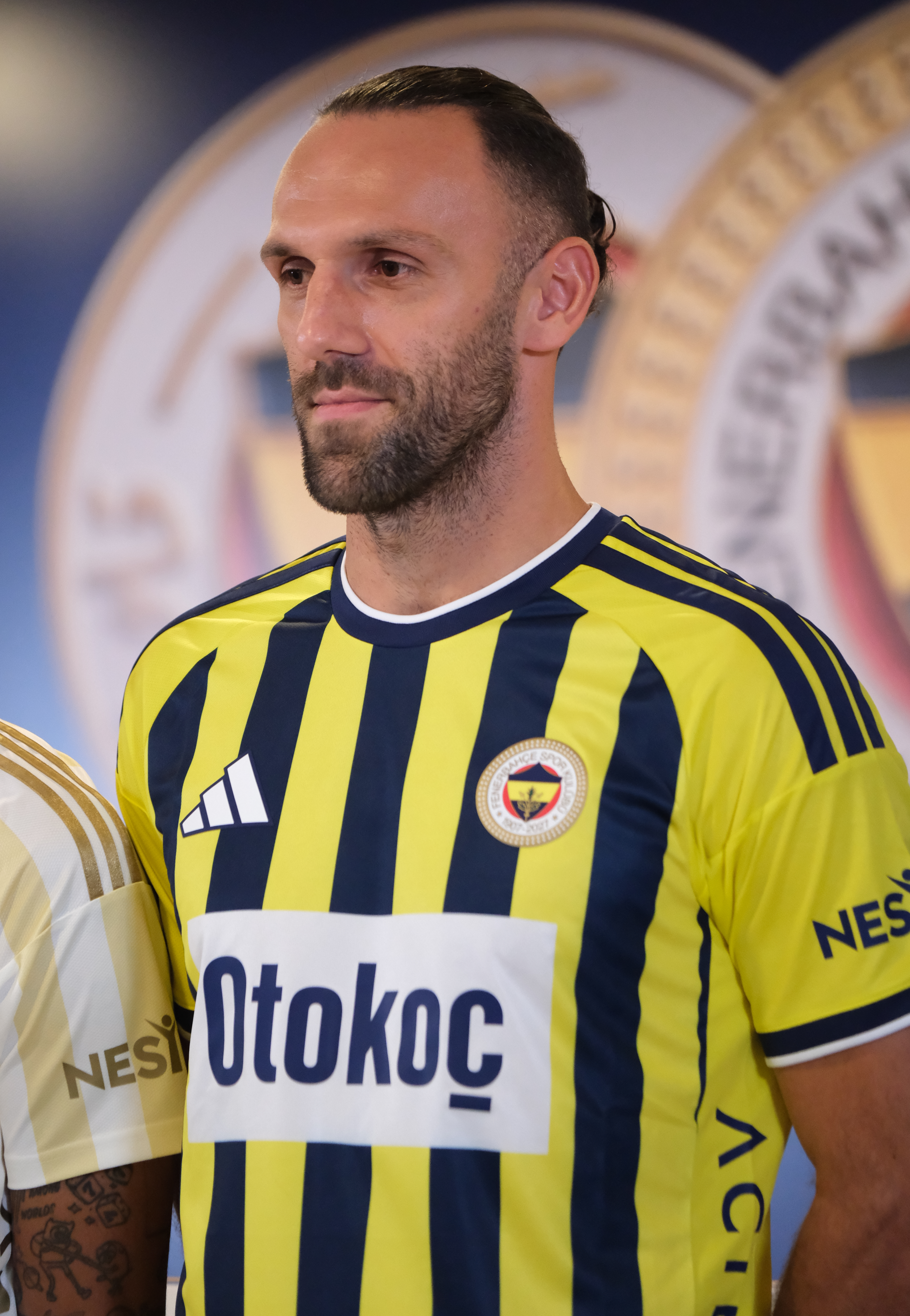
Muriqi in 2026

Vedat Muriqi is a Kosovan professional footballer who has represented the Kosovo national team since his debut on 9 October 2016 in a 3–0 defeat against Ukraine during a 2018 FIFA World Cup qualifier held in Kraków, Poland.

He scored his first international goal on 13 November 2017, in a 4–3 friendly win against Latvia at the Adem Jashari Olympic Stadium in Mitrovica. Since then, Muriqi has established himself as the all-time leading goalscorer for Kosovo, with 33 goals in 73 appearances as of 17 November 2026.

Muriqi has represented Kosovo across multiple competitions, including the UEFA Euro 2020 and UEFA Euro 2024 qualifying campaigns, the 2022 and 2026 FIFA World Cup qualifiers, and five editions of the UEFA Nations League.

He scored his first competitive goal on 11 October 2018 in a 3–1 win against Malta during the 2018–19 UEFA Nations League D. He has since scored in every major competition Kosovo has participated in. Among his standout performances are his two-goal display against Cyprus in a 5–1 victory in September 2022, and a hat-trick against Iceland on 23 March 2025 in the 2024–25 UEFA Nations League play-offs.

Muriqi has scored against notable opponents including Switzerland, Greece, Sweden, and England. More than half of his international goals have come at Kosovo's home ground, the Fadil Vokrri Stadium in Pristina.

His international record reflects consistent performances across friendly and competitive fixtures, marking him as one of Kosovo's most influential players since the nation's admission to UEFA, and FIFA in 2016.

== Goals ==
Table key
‡	Indicates goal was scored from a penalty kick
	Indicates Kosovo or Albania won the match
	Indicates the match ended in a draw (a penalty shoot-out is statistically a draw regardless of shoot-out results)
	Indicates Kosovo or Albania lost the match

Scores and results list Kosovo's and Albania's goal tally first, score column indicates score after each Muriqi goal.

No.	National team	Date	Venue	Opponent	Score	Result	Competition	Ref.
Under-21 goals
1	Kosovo	12 June 2013	Complexe Sportif du Bout du Lac, Le Bouveret, Switzerland	Ghana	1–1	2–2 (4–5 p)	2013 Valais Youth Cup	
1	Albania	10 August 2014	Jean Pădureanu Stadium, Bistrița, Romania	Romania	1–3	1–3	Friendly	
Senior goals
1	Kosovo	13 November 2017	Adem Jashari Olympic Stadium, Mitrovica, Kosovo	Latvia	2–2	4–3	Friendly	
2	Kosovo	27 March 2018	Stade Municipal Jean Rolland, Franconville, France	Burkina Faso	1–0	2–0	Friendly	
3	Kosovo	11 October 2018	Fadil Vokrri Stadium, Pristina, Kosovo	Malta	2–1	3–1	2018–19 UEFA Nations League D	
4	Kosovo	17 November 2018	National Stadium, Ta' Qali, Malta	Malta	1–0	5–0	2018–19 UEFA Nations League D	
5	Kosovo	10 June 2019	Vasil Levski National Stadium, Sofia, Bulgaria	Bulgaria	2–2	3–2	UEFA Euro 2020 qualifying	
6	Kosovo	7 September 2019	Fadil Vokrri Stadium, Pristina, Kosovo	Czech Republic	1–1	2–1	UEFA Euro 2020 qualifying	
7	Kosovo	10 September 2019	St Mary's Stadium, Southampton, England	England	3–5‡	3–5	UEFA Euro 2020 qualifying	
8	Kosovo	14 October 2019	Fadil Vokrri Stadium, Pristina, Kosovo	Montenegro	2–0	2–0	UEFA Euro 2020 qualifying	
9	Kosovo	11 November 2020	Elbasan Arena, Elbasan, Albania	Albania	1–2‡	1–2	Friendly	
10	Kosovo	15 November 2020	Stožice Stadium, Ljubljana, Slovenia	Slovenia	1–0	1–2	2020–21 UEFA Nations League C	
11	Kosovo	24 March 2021	Fadil Vokrri Stadium, Pristina, Kosovo	Lithuania	2–0	4–0	Friendly	
12	Kosovo	1 June 2021	Fadil Vokrri Stadium, Pristina, Kosovo	San Marino	1–0	4–1	Friendly	
13	Kosovo	1 June 2021	Fadil Vokrri Stadium, Pristina, Kosovo	San Marino	2–0	4–1	Friendly	
14	Kosovo	1 June 2021	Fadil Vokrri Stadium, Pristina, Kosovo	San Marino	3–0	4–1	Friendly	
15	Kosovo	1 June 2021	Fadil Vokrri Stadium, Pristina, Kosovo	San Marino	4–0‡	4–1	Friendly	
16	Kosovo	2 September 2021	Batumi Stadium, Batumi, Georgia	Georgia	1–0	1–0	2022 FIFA World Cup qualification	
17	Kosovo	5 September 2021	Fadil Vokrri Stadium, Pristina, Kosovo	Greece	1–1	1–1	2022 FIFA World Cup qualification	
18	Kosovo	12 October 2021	Fadil Vokrri Stadium, Pristina, Kosovo	Georgia	1–1‡	1–2	2022 FIFA World Cup qualification	
19	Kosovo	9 June 2022	Fadil Vokrri Stadium, Pristina, Kosovo	Northern Ireland	1–0‡	3–2	2022–23 UEFA Nations League C	
20	Kosovo	9 June 2022	Fadil Vokrri Stadium, Pristina, Kosovo	Northern Ireland	3–1	3–2	2022–23 UEFA Nations League C	
21	Kosovo	24 September 2022	Windsor Park, Belfast, Northern Ireland	Northern Ireland	1–0	1–2	2022–23 UEFA Nations League C	
22	Kosovo	27 September 2022	Fadil Vokrri Stadium, Pristina, Kosovo	Cyprus	4–0	5–1	2022–23 UEFA Nations League C	
23	Kosovo	27 September 2022	Fadil Vokrri Stadium, Pristina, Kosovo	Cyprus	5–1	5–1	2022–23 UEFA Nations League C	
24	Kosovo	19 June 2023	Szusza Ferenc Stadion, Budapest, Hungary	Belarus	1–2‡	1–2	UEFA Euro 2024 qualifying	
25	Kosovo	9 September 2023	Fadil Vokrri Stadium, Pristina, Kosovo	Switzerland	1–1	2–2	UEFA Euro 2024 qualifying	
26	Kosovo	9 September 2023	Fadil Vokrri Stadium, Pristina, Kosovo	Switzerland	2–2	2–2	UEFA Euro 2024 qualifying	
27	Kosovo	9 September 2024	AEK Arena – Georgios Karapatakis, Larnaca, Cyprus	Cyprus	1–0‡	4–0	2024–25 UEFA Nations League C	
28	Kosovo	9 September 2024	AEK Arena – Georgios Karapatakis, Larnaca, Cyprus	Cyprus	2–0	4–0	2024–25 UEFA Nations League C	
29	Kosovo	23 March 2025	Nueva Condomina, Murcia, Spain	Iceland	1–1	3–1	2024–25 UEFA Nations League promotion/relegation play-offs	
30	Kosovo	23 March 2025	Nueva Condomina, Murcia, Spain	Iceland	2–1	3–1	2024–25 UEFA Nations League promotion/relegation play-offs	
31	Kosovo	23 March 2025	Nueva Condomina, Murcia, Spain	Iceland	3–1	3–1	2024–25 UEFA Nations League promotion/relegation play-offs	
32	Kosovo	8 September 2025	Fadil Vokrri Stadium, Pristina, Kosovo	Sweden	2–0	2–0	2026 FIFA World Cup qualification	
33	Kosovo	24 September 2026	Fadil Vokrri Stadium, Pristina, Kosovo	Republic of Ireland	1–0	1–0	2026–27 UEFA Nations League B	

== Hat-tricks ==
Date	Venue	Opponent	Score	Result	Competition	Ref.
1 June 2021	Fadil Vokrri Stadium, Pristina, Kosovo	San Marino	1–0 2–0 3–0 4–0	4–1	Friendly	
23 March 2025	Nueva Condomina, Murcia, Spain	Iceland	1–1 2–1 3–1	3–1	2024–25 UEFA Nations League promotion/relegation play-offs	

== Statistics ==
As of match played 17 November 2026

Appearances and goals by year and competition
Year	Competitive		Friendly		Total	
Year	Apps	Goals	Apps	Goals	Apps	Goals
Under-21
2013	0	0	1	1	1	1
2014	0	0	1	1	1	1
Total	0	0	2	2	2	2
Senior
2016	2	0	0	0	2	0
2017	4	0	1	1	5	1
2018	6	3	3	0	9	3
2019	5	3	2	1	7	4
2020	2	0	1	2	3	2
2021	6	5	5	3	11	8
2022	4	3	3	2	7	5
2023	4	2	3	1	7	3
2024	5	1	2	1	7	2
2025	6	3	2	1	8	4
2026	7	1	0	0	7	1
Total	51	21	24	12	73	33
Career total	51	21	26	14	75	35

Caps and goals by competition
Competition	Caps	Goals
Under-21
2013 Valais Youth Cup	1	1
Friendly matches	1	1
Total	2	2
Senior
UEFA Nations League	25	14
FIFA World Cup qualifiers	22	5
Friendly matches	13	8
UEFA European Championship qualifying	13	7
Total	73	33
Career total	75	35

Goals by confederation
Confederation		Goals
Under-21
CAF	Africa	1
UEFA	Europe	1
Total		2
Senior
UEFA	Europe	33
AFC	Asia	0
CAF	Africa	0
CONCACAF	North and Central America	0
CONMEBOL	South America	0
OFC	Oceania	0
Total		33
Career total		35

Goals by opponent
Opponent	Goals
Under-21 goals
Ghana	1
Romania	1
Total	2
Senior goals
Cyprus	4
San Marino	4
Iceland	3
Northern Ireland	3
Georgia	2
Malta	2
Switzerland	2
Albania	1
Belarus	1
Bulgaria	1
Burkina Faso	1
Czech Republic	1
England	1
Greece	1
Latvia	1
Lithuania	1
Montenegro	1
Republic of Ireland	1
Slovenia	1
Sweden	1
Total	33
Career total	35

== See also ==
- List of top international men's football goalscorers by country
