= 2022–23 RCD Mallorca season =

RCD Mallorca
2022–23 season
- Owner: Robert Sarver
- President: Andy Kohlberg
- Head coach: Javier Aguirre
- Stadium: Visit Mallorca Stadium
- La Liga: 9th
- Copa del Rey: Round of 16
- Top goalscorer: League: Vedat Muriqi (15); All: Vedat Muriqi (16)
- Highest home attendance: 18,258 v Real Madrid; 1 October 2022
- Lowest home attendance: 12,253 v Celta Vigo; 20 January 2023
- Average home league attendance: 14,766
- Biggest win: 6–0 v Autol; 12 November 2022
- Biggest defeat: 1–4 v Real Madrid; 11 September 2022; 0–3 v Almería; 20 May 2023; 0–3 v Barcelona; 28 May 2023
Home colours	Away colours	Third colours

The 2022–23 season was the 89th season in the history of RCD Mallorca and their second consecutive season in the top flight. The club participated in La Liga and the Copa del Rey.

== Players ==
=== First-team squad ===
As of 3 February 2023

Note: Flags indicate national team as defined under FIFA eligibility rules; some limited exceptions apply. Players may hold more than one non-FIFA nationality.

No.	Pos.	Nation	Player
1	GK	SRB	Predrag Rajković
2	DF	SRB	Matija Nastasić
4	MF	ESP	Iñigo Ruiz de Galarreta
5	DF	BIH	Dennis Hadžikadunić (on loan from Rostov)
6	DF	ESP	José Manuel Copete
7	FW	KOS	Vedat Muriqi
8	MF	FRA	Clément Grenier
9	FW	ESP	Abdón
10	MF	ESP	Antonio Sánchez
11	MF	ESP	Manu Morlanes (on loan from Villarreal)
12	MF	GHA	Iddrisu Baba
13	GK	SVK	Dominik Greif
14	MF	ESP	Dani Rodríguez
15	DF	ESP	Pablo Maffeo

No.	Pos.	Nation	Player
16	MF	ARG	Rodrigo Battaglia
17	FW	ZIM	Tino Kadewere (on loan from Lyon)
18	DF	ESP	Jaume Costa
19	MF	KOR	Lee Kang-in
20	DF	URU	Giovanni González
21	DF	ESP	Antonio Raíllo (captain)
22	FW	ESP	Ángel
23	MF	SEN	Amath Ndiaye
24	DF	SVK	Martin Valjent
29	DF	ESP	Josep Gayá
31	GK	ESP	Leo Román
—	DF	SWE	Ludwig Augustinsson (on loan from Sevilla)
—	MF	COL	Daniel Luna (on loan from Deportivo Cali)

=== Out on loan ===
Note: Flags indicate national team as defined under FIFA eligibility rules; some limited exceptions apply. Players may hold more than one non-FIFA nationality.

No.	Pos.	Nation	Player
—	DF	ARG	Braian Cufré (at New York City until 31 December 2023)
—	FW	ESP	Javi Llabrés (at Mirandés until 30 June 2023)
—	FW	ESP	Jordi Mboula (at Racing Santander until 30 June 2023)

== Transfers ==
=== In ===
Date	Player	From	Type	Fee	Ref.
1 July 2022	(Spain) Pablo Maffeo	(Germany) VfB Stuttgart	Buyout clause	Undisclosed	
1 July 2022	(Spain) José Manuel Copete	Ponferradina	Transfer	Free	
22 July 2022	(Kosovo) Vedat Muriqi	(Italy) Lazio	Transfer	Undisclosed	
22 July 2022	(Serbia) Predrag Rajković	(France) Reims	Transfer	€4.5m	
29 July 2022	(Argentina) Rodrigo Battaglia	(Portugal) Sporting CP	Transfer	Undisclosed	
29 August 2022	(Zimbabwe) Tino Kadewere	(France) Lyon	Loan		
1 September 2022	(Serbia) Matija Nastasić	(Italy) Fiorentina	Transfer	Free	
18 January 2023	(Bosnia and Herzegovina) Dennis Hadžikadunić	(Russia) Rostov	Loan		
30 January 2023	(Sweden) Ludwig Augustinsson	Sevilla	Loan		
31 January 2023	(Colombia) Daniel Luna	(Colombia) Deportivo Cali	Loan		
31 January 2023	(Spain) Manu Morlanes	Villarreal	Loan		

=== Out ===
Date	Player	To	Type	Fee	Ref.
1 July 2022	(Spain) Salva Sevilla	Alavés	Transfer	Free	
1 July 2022	(Spain) Brian Oliván	Espanyol	Transfer	Free	
3 July 2022	(Serbia) Aleksandar Sedlar	Alavés	Transfer	Free	
4 July 2022	(Spain) Aleix Febas	Released			
10 August 2022	(United States) Matthew Hoppe	(England) Middlesbrough	Transfer	Undisclosed	
1 September 2022	(Spain) Álex Alegría	Fuenlabrada	Loan		
11 January 2023	(Ivory Coast) Lago Junior	Released			
16 January 2023	(Argentina) Franco Russo	(Bulgaria) Ludogorets Razgrad	Transfer	Undisclosed	
18 January 2023	(Spain) Javier Llabrés	Mirandés	Loan		
31 January 2023	(Spain) Álex Alegría	Released			
3 February 2023	(Argentina) Braian Cufré	(United States) New York City FC	Loan		

== Pre-season and friendlies ==
Win Draw Loss Fixtures

16 July 2022 Friendly	Mallorca	3–0	Wieczysta Kraków	Kematen, Austria
15:15 CEST (UTC+2)	Ángel 13'; Junior 46'; Russo (yellow card) 63'; Rodríguez 73', (yellow card) 87'			Referee: Emanuel Barsan (France)

19 July 2022 Friendly	Mallorca	0–0	Qatar	Schwaz, Austria
18:00 CEST (UTC+2)	Copete (yellow card) 74'		Ali (yellow card) 48'; Al-Ahrak (yellow card) 50'	Stadium: Silberstadt Arena Schwaz; Referee: Stefan Gamper (Austria)

22 July 2022 Friendly	Genoa	0–1	Mallorca	Schwaz, Austria
17:00 CEST (UTC+2)			Junior 72'	Stadium: Silberstadt Arena Schwaz

27 July 2022 Friendly	Mallorca	1–0	Sporting Gijón	Palma
20:00 CEST (UTC+2)	Rodríguez 11'			Stadium: Estadi Son Bibiloni

31 July 2022 Friendly	Napoli	1–1	Mallorca	Castel di Sangro, Italy
20:30 CEST (UTC+2)	Osimhen 9' (pen.); Zambo Anguissa (yellow card) 79'		Baba (yellow card) 39'; Raíllo 55'	Stadium: Stadio Teofilo Patini

16 November 2022 Trofeu de s’Agricultura	Poblense	1–4	Mallorca	Sa Pobla
18:00 CET (UTC+1)	Plomer 38'	Report	Kadewere 25', 78', 81'; Ndiaye 68'	Stadium: Estadio Municipal de Sa Pobla

10 December 2022 Friendly	Mallorca	2–2	Mainz 05	Palma
12:30 CET (UTC+1)	Ndiaye 1'; Muriqi 38'		Barkok 20' (pen.); Da Costa 52'	Stadium: Estadi Son Bibiloni; Referee: Miguel Domato

14 December 2022 Friendly	Mallorca	1–2	Bologna	Palma
18:00 CET (UTC+1)	Kadewere 54'		Arnautović 21'; Orsolini 59'	Stadium: Estadi Son Bibiloni

== Competitions ==
=== Overall record ===
Competition	First match	Last match	Starting round	Final position	Record							
Competition	First match	Last match	Starting round	Final position	Pld	W	D	L	GF	GA	GD	Win %
La Liga	15 August 2022	4 June 2023	Matchday 1	9th	38	14	8	16	37	43	−6	36.84
Copa del Rey	12 November 2022	17 January 2023	First round	Round of 16	4	3	0	1	9	1	+8	75.00
Total					42	17	8	17	46	44	+2	40.48

Source: Soccerway

=== La Liga ===
==== League table ====
Pos	Team	Pld	W	D	L	GF	GA	GD	Pts	Qualification or relegation
7	Osasuna	38	15	8	15	37	42	−5	53	Qualification for the Europa Conference League play-off round (Note: Osasuna were initially disqualified from the 2023–24 UEFA Europa Conference League due to historic match-fixing. However, the club became later eligible to participate after an evidence of innocence had been provided.)
8	Athletic Bilbao	38	14	9	15	47	43	+4	51	
9	Mallorca	38	14	8	16	37	43	−6	50	
10	Girona	38	13	10	15	58	55	+3	49 (Note: Head-to-head points: Girona 8, Rayo Vallecano 6, Sevilla 1.)	
11	Rayo Vallecano	38	13	10	15	45	53	−8	49	

Source: LaLiga Santander
Rules for classification: 1) Points; 2) Head-to-head points; 3) Head-to-head goal difference; 4) Goal difference; 5) Goals scored; 6) Fair-play points (Note: Head-to-head record is used only after all the matches between the teams in question have been played)

==== Results summary ====
Overall								Home						Away					
Pld	W	D	L	GF	GA	GD	Pts	W	D	L	GF	GA	GD	W	D	L	GF	GA	GD
38	14	8	16	37	43	−6	50	10	5	4	22	12	+10	4	3	12	15	31	−16

Source: La Liga

==== Results by round ====
Round	1	2	3	4	5	6	7	8	9	10	11	12	13	14	15	16	17	18	19	20	21	22	23	24	25	26	27	28	29	30	31	32	33	34	35	36	37	38
Ground	A	H	A	H	A	H	H	A	H	A	A	H	A	H	A	H	A	H	A	H	A	H	A	H	H	A	H	A	A	H	A	H	A	H	A	H	A	H
Result	D	L	W	D	L	W	L	D	L	L	W	D	W	W	L	W	L	W	L	W	L	W	L	L	D	L	D	D	W	W	L	D	L	W	L	W	L	W
Position	12	14	9	11	13	10	12	12	12	15	12	12	12	11	11	10	10	10	10	10	10	8	10	10	10	11	12	12	11	10	12	11	12	12	12	11	12	9

Source: La Liga
A = Away; H = Home; W = Win; D = Draw; L = Loss

==== Matches ====
The league fixtures were announced on 23 June 2022.

15 August 2022 1	Athletic Bilbao	0–0	Mallorca	Bilbao
17:30 CEST (UTC+2)		Report	Copete (yellow card) 22'; Battaglia (yellow card) 31'; Rodríguez (yellow card) 35'; Sánchez (yellow card) 66'; Lee (yellow card) 71'; Grenier (yellow card) 76'	Stadium: San Mamés; Attendance: 39,747; Referee: Javier Iglesias Villanueva

20 August 2022 2	Mallorca	1–2	Real Betis	Palma
19:30 CEST (UTC+2)	Grenier (yellow card) 45+3'; Muriqi 56'; Rodríguez (yellow card) 66'; Valjent (yellow card) 70'; Raíllo (yellow card) 70'; Battaglia (yellow card) 73'; Maffeo (yellow card) 84'; Costa (yellow card) 90+10'	Report	Carvalho (yellow card) 1'; Iglesias 9' (pen.), 73' (pen.); Juanmi (yellow card) 36'; Fekir (yellow card) 65'; Pezzella (yellow card) 70'; Rober (yellow card) 82'; Rodríguez (yellow card) 84'; Silva (yellow card) 86'; Loren (yellow card) 90+1'	Stadium: Visit Mallorca Stadium; Attendance: 15,579; Referee: Pablo González Fuertes

27 August 2022 3	Rayo Vallecano	0–2	Mallorca	Madrid
19:30 CEST (UTC+2)	Valentín (yellow card) 66'	Report	Muriqi 13'; Grenier (yellow card) 63'; Lee 64'; Sánchez (yellow card) 73'; Copete (yellow card) 79'	Stadium: Campo de Fútbol de Vallecas; Attendance: 10,944; Referee: José María Sánchez Martínez

3 September 2022 4	Mallorca	1–1	Girona	Palma
14:00 CEST (UTC+2)	Battaglia (yellow card) 14'; Muriqi (yellow card) 29'; Sánchez (yellow card) 58'; Raíllo 87'; Copete (yellow card) 90'	Report	Castellanos (yellow card) 23'; Romeu (yellow card) 49'; Sáiz 90+2' (pen.)	Stadium: Visit Mallorca Stadium; Attendance: 13,390; Referee: Isidro Díaz de Mera Escuderos

11 September 2022 5	Real Madrid	4–1	Mallorca	Madrid
14:00 CEST (UTC+2)	Mendy (yellow card) 25'; Valverde (yellow card) 34', (goal) 45+3'; Vinícius 72'; Alaba (yellow card) 81'; Rodrygo 89'; Rüdiger 90+3'	Report	Nastasić (yellow card) 16'; Maffeo (yellow card) 25'; Muriqi 35'; Raíllo (yellow card) 39'; Valjent (yellow card) 85'; Sánchez (yellow card) 86'	Stadium: Santiago Bernabéu; Attendance: 54,816; Referee: Jorge Figueroa Vázquez

17 September 2022 6	Mallorca	1–0	Almería	Palma
14:00 CEST (UTC+2)	Ruiz de Galarreta (yellow card) 5'; Maffeo 25'; Costa (yellow card) 52'; Lee (yellow card) 90+5'	Report	Robertone (yellow card) 36'; Chumi (yellow card) 65'; Ramazani (yellow card) 78'; Ely (yellow card) 90'; Puigmal (yellow card) 90+5'; Sousa (yellow card) 90+6'	Stadium: Visit Mallorca Stadium; Attendance: 12,687; Referee: Juan Martínez Munuera

1 October 2022 7	Mallorca	0–1	Barcelona	Palma
21:00 CEST (UTC+2)	Costa (yellow card) 42'; Valjent (yellow card) 83'	Report	Lewandowski 20'; Christensen (yellow card) 39'; Piqué (yellow card) 40'; Kessié (yellow card) 45'; Busquets (yellow card) 75'	Stadium: Visit Mallorca Stadium; Attendance: 18,103; Referee: Jesús Gil Manzano

10 October 2022 8	Elche	1–1	Mallorca	Elche
21:00 CEST (UTC+2)	Ponce 15', (yellow card) 15'; Boyé (red card) 61'; Verdú (yellow card) 70'; Mascarell (yellow card) 73'; Bigas (yellow card) 80'	Report	Muriqi (penalty missed) 12', 71' (pen.), (red card) 85'; Grenier (yellow card) 73'; Raíllo (yellow card) 78'; Rajković (yellow card) 87'; Battaglia (yellow card) 90+9'	Stadium: Martínez Valero; Attendance: 12,000; Referee: Valentín Pizarro Gómez

15 October 2022 9	Mallorca	0–1	Sevilla	Palma
18:30 CEST (UTC+2)	Ruiz de Galarreta (yellow card) 36'; Rodríguez (yellow card) 90+5'	Report	Montiel (yellow card) 28'; Marcão (yellow card) 35'; Lamela (yellow card) 45+1'; Gudelj 53'	Stadium: Visit Mallorca Stadium; Attendance: 15,300; Referee: Javier Iglesias Villanueva

19 October 2022 10	Real Sociedad	1–0	Mallorca	San Sebastián
20:00 CEST (UTC+2)	Merino 4'; Guevara (yellow card) 51'	Report	Maffeo (yellow card) 63'; Grenier (yellow card) 81'	Stadium: Anoeta; Attendance: 27,085; Referee: Miguel Ángel Ortiz Arias

22 October 2022 11	Valencia	1–2	Mallorca	Valencia
18:30 CEST (UTC+2)	Cavani 52' (pen.); Gabriel (yellow card) 65'; Musah (yellow card) 70'; Guillamón (yellow card) 90+1'	Report	Battaglia (yellow card) 15'; Muriqi (yellow card) 60', (goal) 66' (pen.); Lee 83'; Ruiz de Galarreta (yellow card) 86'; Rodríguez (yellow card) 90+2'; Raíllo (yellow card) 90+2'	Stadium: Mestalla; Attendance: 41,199; Referee: José María Sánchez Martínez

28 October 2022 12	Mallorca	1–1	Espanyol	Palma
21:00 CEST (UTC+2)	Ruiz de Galarreta (yellow card) 45+1'; Muriqi 48'; González (yellow card) 76'; Raíllo (yellow card) 89'; Valjent (yellow card) 90+4'	Report	Lazo 70'; Darder (yellow card) 78'	Stadium: Visit Mallorca Stadium; Attendance: 13,982; Referee: Isidro Díaz de Mera Escuderos

6 November 2022 13	Villarreal	0–2	Mallorca	Valencia
18:30 CET (UTC+1)	Chukwueze (yellow card) 49'; Moreno (yellow card) 58'; Baena (yellow card) 64'; Torres (yellow card) 75'	Report	Muriqi 32'; Baba (yellow card) 41'; González (yellow card) 47'; Lee (yellow card) 55'; Rodríguez (yellow card) 60'; Muriqi (yellow card) 71'; Ndiaye 75'; Costa (yellow card) 83'	Stadium: Estadi Ciutat de València; Attendance: 16,603; Referee: Alejandro Muñiz Ruiz

9 November 2022 14	Mallorca	1–0	Atlético Madrid	Palma
21:30 CET (UTC+1)	Muriqi 16'; Baba (yellow card) 26'; Lee (yellow card) 36'; Ruiz de Galarreta (yellow card) 71'; Grenier (yellow card) 90+3'; Valjent (yellow card) 90+3'	Report	Molina (yellow card) 15'; De Paul (yellow card) 34'; Correa (yellow card) 90+6'	Stadium: Visit Mallorca Stadium; Attendance: 14,475; Referee: Mario Melero López

30 December 2022 15	Getafe	2–0	Mallorca	Getafe
17:00 CET (UTC+1)	Mayoral 51', 78'	Report	Muriqi (yellow card) 27'	Stadium: Coliseum Alfonso Pérez; Attendance: 9,755; Referee: Javier Alberola Rojas

7 January 2023 16	Mallorca	1–0	Valladolid	Palma
21:00 CET (UTC+1)	Valjent (yellow card) 31'; Copete (yellow card) 61'; Prats 90+4'	Report	Fresneda (yellow card) 61'; Kike (yellow card) 69'; Kenedy (yellow card) 90+3'	Stadium: Visit Mallorca Stadium; Attendance: 17,129; Referee: Valentín Pizarro Gómez

14 January 2023 17	Osasuna	1–0	Mallorca	Pamplona
18:30 CET (UTC+1)	Oroz 47'; Ávila (yellow card) 58'; Torró (yellow card) 78'	Report	Lee (yellow card) 39'; Grenier (yellow card) 90+4'; Valjent (yellow card) 90+4'	Stadium: El Sadar; Attendance: 19,887; Referee: César Soto Grado

20 January 2023 18	Mallorca	1–0	Celta Vigo	Palma
21:00 CET (UTC+1)	Baba (yellow card) 32'; Rodríguez 59'; Rajković (yellow card) 76'; Prats (yellow card) 90+5'	Report	Aidoo (yellow card) 86'; Rodríguez (yellow card) 89'	Stadium: Visit Mallorca Stadium; Attendance: 12,253; Referee: Juan Luis Pulido Santana

28 January 2023 19	Cádiz	2–0	Mallorca	Cádiz
14:00 CET (UTC+1)	Bongonda 10'; Fernández 38' (pen.); Alcaraz (yellow card) 50'; Carcelén (yellow card) 77'	Report	Copete (yellow card) 44'; Ndiaye (yellow card) 90+3'	Stadium: Nuevo Mirandilla; Attendance: 16,338; Referee: Ricardo de Burgos Bengoetxea

5 February 2023 20	Mallorca	1–0	Real Madrid	Palma
14:00 CET (UTC+1)	Nacho 13' (o.g.); Costa (yellow card) 61'; Ndiaye (yellow card) 72'; Ruiz de Galarreta (yellow card) 80'; Maffeo (yellow card) 87'; Raíllo (yellow card) 90+2'	Report	Vinícius (yellow card) 44'; Ceballos (yellow card) 45+2'; Asensio (penalty missed) 60'; Valverde (yellow card) 64'; Modrić (yellow card) 81'; Mariano (yellow card) 90'	Stadium: Visit Mallorca Stadium; Attendance: 18,258; Referee: Alejandro Hernández Hernández

11 February 2023 21	Sevilla	2–0	Mallorca	Seville
18:30 CET (UTC+1)	En-Nesyri 28'; Gil 40', (yellow card) 71'; Montiel (yellow card) 83'; Jordán (yellow card) 85'; Gudelj (yellow card) 90'	Report	Lee (yellow card) 36'; Baba (yellow card) 59'	Stadium: Ramón Sánchez Pizjuán; Attendance: 35,203; Referee: Javier Iglesias Villanueva

18 February 2023 22	Mallorca	4–2	Villarreal	Palma
18:30 CET (UTC+1)	Kadewere 20'; Rodríguez (yellow card) 23', (goal) 45', 56'; Raíllo (yellow card) 37'; Muriqi 63'; Costa (yellow card) 69'; Copete (yellow card) 72'; Nastasić (yellow card) 89'	Report	Trigueros (red card) 22'; Morales 43'; Chukwueze 50'	Stadium: Visit Mallorca Stadium; Attendance: 13,957; Referee: José María Sánchez Martínez

25 February 2023 23	Espanyol	2–1	Mallorca	Cornellà de Llobregat
14:00 CET (UTC+1)	Braithwaite 22', 51'; Gragera (yellow card) 74'; Melamed (yellow card) 83'	Report	Muriqi 41'; Ruiz de Galarreta (yellow card) 62'; Rajković (yellow card) 83'	Stadium: RCDE Stadium; Attendance: 21,403; Referee: Javier Alberola Rojas

4 March 2023 24	Mallorca	0–1	Elche	Palma
18:30 CET (UTC+1)	Raíllo (yellow card) 49'; Copete (yellow card) 65'; Muriqi (yellow card) 77'; Costa (yellow card) 90+11'	Report	Nteka (yellow card) 11'; Carmona (yellow card) 39'; Boyé (yellow card) 65', (goal) 88'	Stadium: Visit Mallorca Stadium; Attendance: 14,065; Referee: José Luis Munuera Montero

12 March 2023 25	Mallorca	1–1	Real Sociedad	Palma
14:00 CET (UTC+1)	Rodríguez (yellow card) 11'; Lee 50'; González (yellow card) 79'	Report	Fernández 3', (yellow card) 41'; Merino (red card) 90'; Sørloth (yellow card) 90+5'	Stadium: Visit Mallorca Stadium; Attendance: 13,840; Referee: Juan Martínez Munuera

19 March 2023 26	Real Betis	1–0	Mallorca	Seville
14:00 CET (UTC+1)	Iglesias 48'; Guardado (yellow card) 81'	Report	Costa (yellow card) 31'; Nastasić (yellow card) 54'	Stadium: Benito Villamarín; Attendance: 50,402; Referee: Valentín Pizarro Gomez

31 March 2023 27	Mallorca	0–0	Osasuna	Palma
21:00 CEST (UTC+2)	Baba (yellow card) 30'; Ruiz de Galarreta (yellow card) 37'; González (yellow card) 45+1'; Copete (red card) 69'; Lee (yellow card) 70'; Raíllo (yellow card) 74'; Ángel (yellow card) 74'; Costa (yellow card) 90+4'	Report	Vidal (yellow card) 34'; Budimir (yellow card) 90+2'; Moreno (yellow card) 90+4'	Stadium: Visit Mallorca Stadium; Attendance: 14,312; Referee: Isidro Díaz de Mera Escuderos

9 April 2023 28	Valladolid	3–3	Mallorca	Valladolid
14:00 CEST (UTC+2)	Mesa (yellow card) 10'; Kike 33'; Rosa (yellow card) 56'; Amallah 68'; Monchu 86'; Larin (yellow card) 90+3'	Report	Ruiz de Galarreta (yellow card) 38'; Valjent (yellow card) 45+1'; Muriqi 53', 90+4' (pen.); Morlanes 58', (yellow card) 74'; Costa (yellow card) 64'; Abdón (yellow card) 90+3'	Stadium: José Zorilla; Attendance: 18,010; Referee: Alejandro Muñiz Ruiz

17 April 2023 29	Celta Vigo	0–1	Mallorca	Vigo
21:00 CEST (UTC+2)	Mallo (yellow card) 45' (yellow-red card) 90+3'	Report	Ndiaye 21'; Morlanes (yellow card) 61'	Stadium: Balaídos; Attendance: 13,557; Referee: Miguel Ángel Ortiz Arias

23 April 2023 30	Mallorca	3–1	Getafe	Palma
18:30 CEST (UTC+2)	Lee 56', 90+5'; Raíllo 64', (yellow card) 64'; Ruiz de Galarreta (yellow card) 88'	Report	Mayoral 23'; Alderete (yellow card) 32'; Villar (yellow card) 87'; Mata (yellow card) 90+6'	Stadium: Visit Mallorca Stadium; Attendance: 15,687; Referee: Pablo González Fuertes

26 April 2023 31	Atlético Madrid	3–1	Mallorca	Madrid
19:30 CEST (UTC+2)	De Paul 45+2'; Morata 47'; Carrasco 77'	Report	Nastasić 20'	Stadium: Cívitas Metropolitano; Attendance: 58,523; Referee: Juan Luis Pulido Santana

1 May 2023 32	Mallorca	1–1	Athletic Bilbao	Palma
19:00 CEST (UTC+2)	Raíllo (yellow card) 13'; Muriqi (yellow card) 17'; Maffeo (yellow card) 29'; Lee 58'; Ruiz de Galarreta (yellow card) 90+4'	Report	Berchiche (yellow card) 40'; N. Williams (yellow card) 63'; I. Williams 90+6' (pen.)	Stadium: Visit Mallorca Stadium; Attendance: 16,807; Referee: Jorge Figueroa Vázquez

4 May 2023 33	Girona	2–1	Mallorca	Girona
19:30 CEST (UTC+2)	Espinosa (yellow card) 14', (goal) 45+2'; Hernández (yellow card) 76'; Castellanos (yellow card) 77', (goal) 84'; Couto (yellow card) 90+2'	Report	Muriqi 80' (pen.)	Stadium: Montilivi; Attendance: 11,767; Referee: Juan Martínez Munuera

12 May 2023 34	Mallorca	1–0	Cádiz	Palma
21:00 CEST (UTC+2)	Maffeo 16', (yellow card) 90+5'; Morlanes (yellow card) 32'; Lee (yellow card) 55'; Costa (yellow card) 56'; Ruiz de Galarreta (yellow card) 58'	Report	Ramos (yellow card) 7'; Alejo (yellow card) 64'; José Mari (yellow card) 69'; Escalante (yellow card) 75'	Stadium: Visit Mallorca Stadium; Attendance: 15,377; Referee: José María Sánchez Martínez

20 May 2023 35	Almería	3–0	Mallorca	Almería
18:30 CEST (UTC+2)	Ely (yellow card) 7'; Lázaro 12', 42', 58'	Report	Lee (yellow card) 67'; Hadžikadunić (yellow card) 83'	Stadium: Power Horse Stadium; Attendance: 12,791; Referee: Carlos del Cerro Grande

25 May 2023 36	Mallorca	1–0	Valencia	Palma
19:30 CEST (UTC+2)	Kadewere (yellow card) 8'; Lee (yellow card) 12'; Rodríguez (yellow card) 39'; Muriqi 64'; Sánchez (yellow card) 90+5'	Report	Cavani (yellow card) 83'; Marí (yellow card) 90+3'	Stadium: Visit Mallorca Stadium; Attendance: 14,631; Referee: Alejandro Hernández Hernández

28 May 2023 37	Barcelona	3–0	Mallorca	Barcelona
19:00 CEST (UTC+2)	Fati 1', 24'; Gavi 70'	Report	Ndiaye (red card) 14'	Stadium: Camp Nou; Attendance: 88,775; Referee: Jorge Figueroa Vázquez

4 June 2023 38	Mallorca	3–0	Rayo Vallecano	Palma
18:30 CEST (UTC+2)	Muriqi 51'; Copete 71'; Ángel 90+3'	Report		Stadium: Visit Mallorca Stadium; Attendance: 14,521; Referee: Antonio Mateu Lahoz

=== Copa del Rey ===
12 November 2022 First round	Autol	0–6	Mallorca	Calahorra (Note: Autol did not play the game in their main stadium La Manzanera, Autol, as it did not meet the broadcasting requirements.)
18:30 CET (UTC+1)		Report	Prats 16', 35'; Grenier 18'; Ángel 29', 72'; Kadewere 88'	Stadium: La Planilla; Referee: Javier Iglesias Villanueva

20 December 2022 Second round	Real Unión	0–1	Mallorca	Irun
21:00 CET (UTC+1)	Jon Ander (yellow card) 25'; Montoro (yellow card) 76'	Report	Rodríguez 20'; Raíllo (yellow card) 25'; Muriqi (yellow card) 82'; Ángel (yellow card) 90+1'	Stadium: Stadium Gal; Attendance: 3,000; Referee: Juan Luis Pulido Santana

4 January 2023 Round of 32	Pontevedra	0–2 (a.e.t.)	Mallorca	Pontevedra
19:00 CET (UTC+1)	Charles (yellow card) 86'; Sánchez (yellow card) 102'; González (yellow card) 102'; Seoane (yellow card) 120+1'	Report	Kadewere (yellow card) 41'; Ruiz de Galarreta (yellow card) 81'; Abdón 97'; Costa (yellow card) 102'; Muriqi 104'; Lee (yellow card) 112'; Copete (yellow card) 117'	Stadium: Pasarón; Attendance: 10,500; Referee: Carlos del Cerro Grande

17 January 2023 Round of 16	Real Sociedad	1–0	Mallorca	San Sebastián
19:00 CET (UTC+1)	Navarro 5'; Méndez (yellow card) 26'; Pacheco (yellow card) 53'; Le Normand (yellow card) 78'	Report	Cufré (yellow card) 41'; González (yellow card) 52'; Copete (yellow card) 90+1'	Stadium: Anoeta; Attendance: 23,408; Referee: Alejandro Hernández Hernández
