= Avni Pepa =

Norwegian footballer (born 1988)

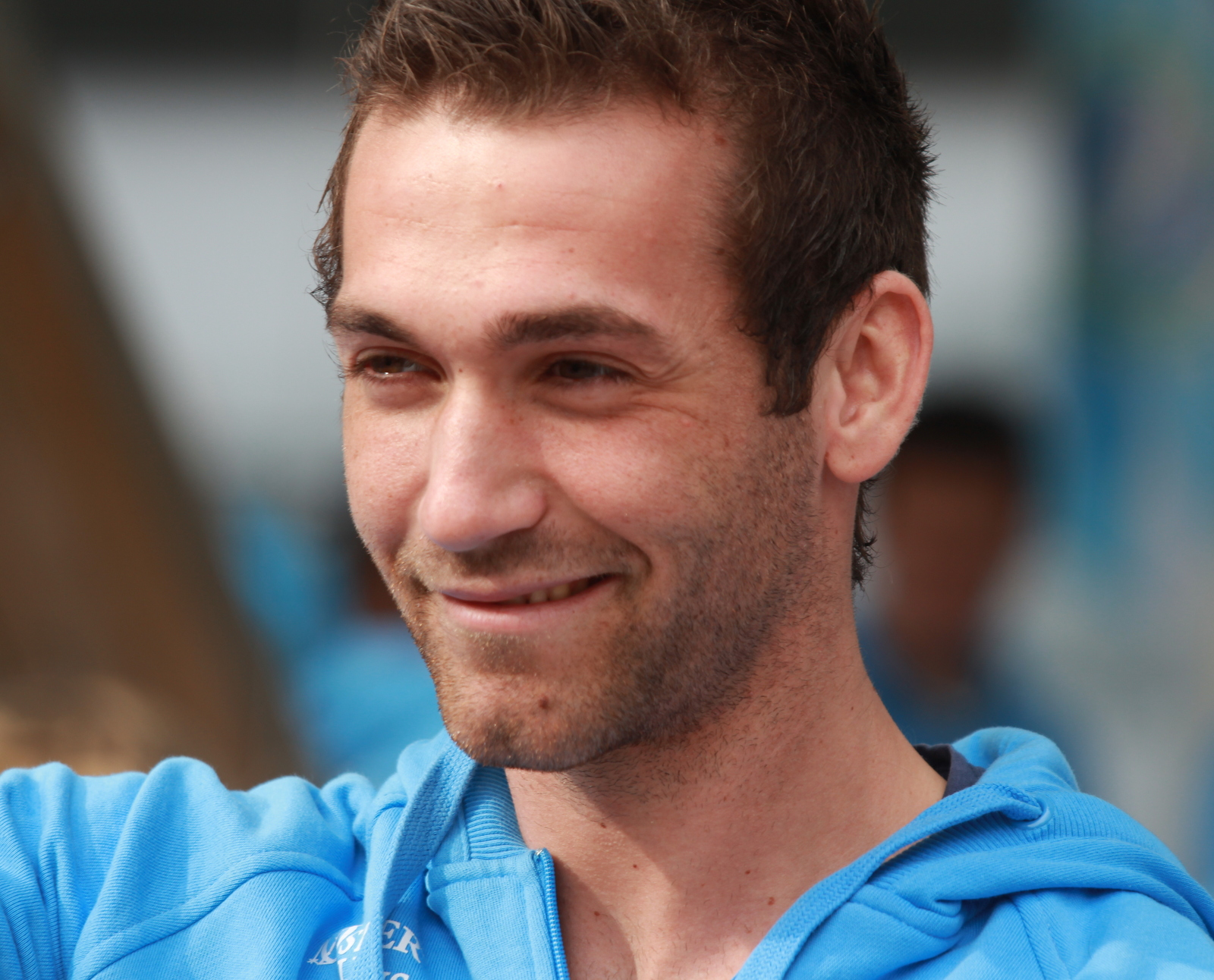
- Pepa with Sandnes Ulf in 2014

Personal information
- Date of birth: 14 November 1988 (age 37)
- Place of birth: Kristiansand, Norway
- Height: 1.83 m (6 ft 0 in)
- Position: Defender

Team information
- Current team: Arendal
- Number: 6

Senior career*
Years	Team	Apps	(Gls)
2007–2011	IK Start	44	(1)
2007	→ Mandalskameratene (loan)	10	(1)
2012–2015	Sandnes Ulf	55	(1)
2015	Flamurtari Vlorë	0	(0)
2015–2017	ÍBV	63	(0)
2017–	Arendal	42	(0)

International career^{‡}
2014–2016	Kosovo	5	(0)
- * Club domestic league appearances and goals as of 11 September 2019 ‡ National team caps and goals as of 6 October 2016

Avni Pepa (born 14 November 1988) is a professional footballer who plays as a defender for Norwegian club Arendal. Born in Norway, he represented the Kosovo national football team at the international level.

== Club career ==
=== IK Start ===
On 14 March 2010, Pepa made his debut in the Tippeligaen when he entered the field to replace Hunter Freeman in a match against Sandefjord. On 7 July, he scored his first goal for IK Start, which allowed the team to overcome Fredrikstad in the Norwegian Cup. On 24 October, he scored his first league goal against Stabæk from an assist by Petter Bruer Hanssen.

==== Loan at Mandalskameratene ====
In 2007, Pepa was loaned to OBOS-ligaen side Mandalskameratene. On 17 June 2007, he made his debut in a 2–1 home defeat against Sparta Sarpsborg after being named in the starting lineup. On 24 June 2007, he scored his first and only goal for Mandalskameratene in a 3-1 defeat against Notodden.

=== Sandnes Ulf ===
After IK Start was relegated from the Tippeligaen, Pepa signed with the newly promoted team Sandnes Ulf as a free agent.

=== Flamurtari Vlorë ===
On 9 January 2015, Pepa signed with the Albanian Superliga side Flamurtari Vlorë. However, on 3 February 2015, he left Flamurtari Vlorë due to issues with the team staff.

=== ÍBV ===
On 19 February 2015, Pepa signed with the Úrvalsdeild karla side ÍBV. On 3 May 2015, he made his debut in a 1–0 away defeat against Fjölnir, after being named in the starting line-up.

=== Arendal ===
On 12 July 2017, Pepa signed with the newly promoted OBOS-ligaen side Arendal. He joined the team alongside his brother, Wilhelm Pepa. On 23 July 2017, he made his debut in a 1–1 away draw against Tromsdalen UIL, after being named in the starting line-up.

== International career ==
On 2 March 2014, Pepa received a call-up from the Kosovo national team for their first FIFA-permitted match against Haiti. He made his debut in the match, starting in the lineup.

== Career statistics ==
As of 31 August 2014

Appearances and goals by club, season and competition
Season	Club	Division	League		Cup		Total	
Season	Club	Division	Apps	Goals	Apps	Goals	Apps	Goals
Mandalskameratene	2007	Adeccoligaen	10	1	0	0	10	1
Start	2008	Adeccoligaen	0	0	0	0	0	0
Start	2009	Tippeligaen	0	0	0	0	0	0
Start	2010	Tippeligaen	19	1	4	1	23	2
Start	2011	Tippeligaen	24	0	3	0	27	0
Sandnes Ulf	2012	Tippeligaen	17	1	0	0	17	1
Sandnes Ulf	2013	Tippeligaen	24	0	0	0	24	0
Sandnes Ulf	2014	Tippeligaen	11	0	1	0	12	0
Flamurtari Vlorë	2014–15	Albanian Superliga	0	0	0	0	0	0
Career total			105	3	8	1	113	4
