= Vedat Muriqi =

Kosovar footballer (born 1994)

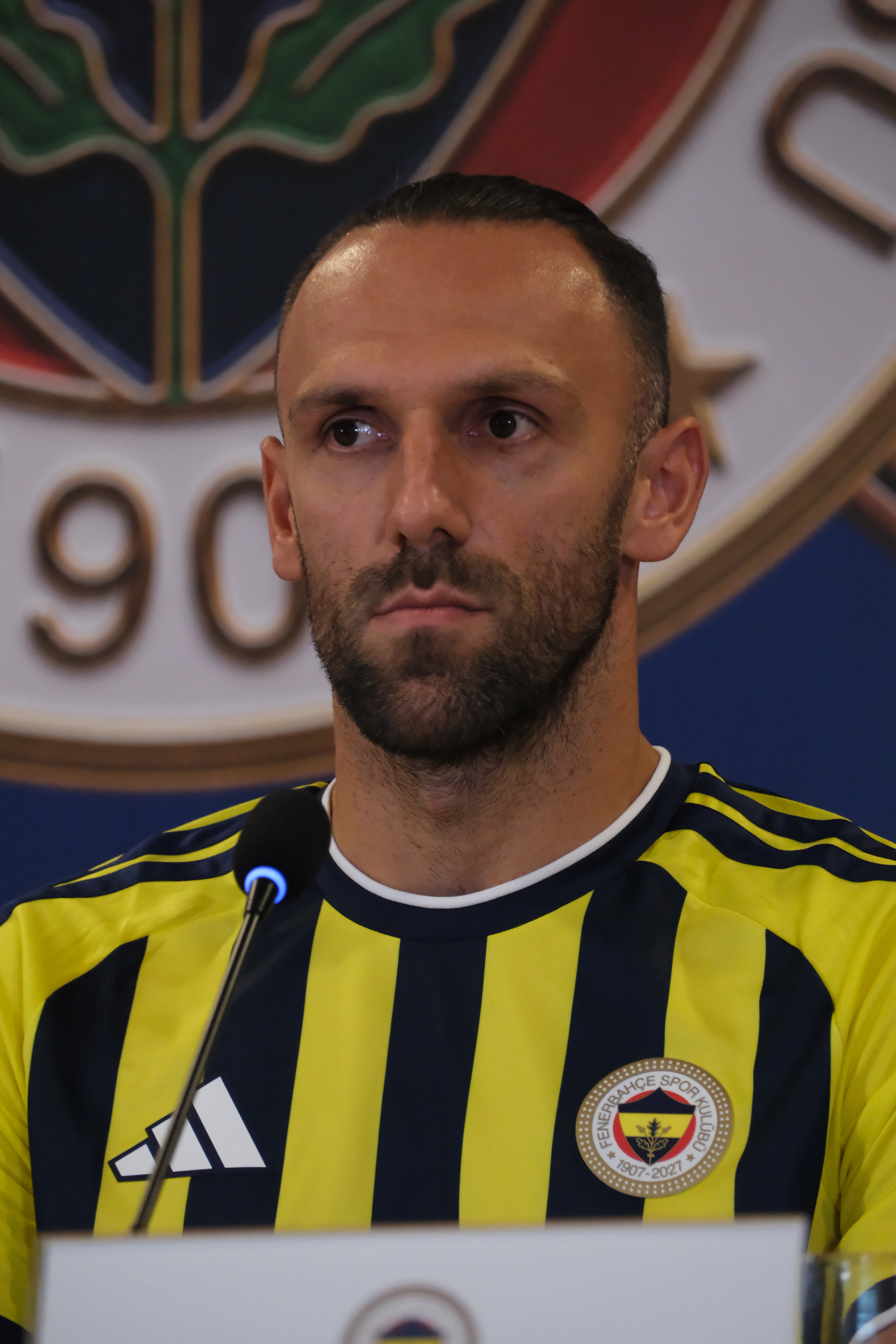
- Muriqi with Fenerbahçe in 2026

Personal information
- Full name: Vedat Muriqi
- Date of birth: 24 April 1994 (age 32)
- Place of birth: Prizren, Kosovo
- Height: 1.94 m (6 ft 4 in)
- Position: Striker

Team information
- Current team: Fenerbahçe
- Number: 19

Youth career
- 2005–2010: Liria Prizren

Senior career*
Years	Team	Apps	(Gls)
2010–2013	Liria Prizren	10	(3)
2013–2014	Teuta	18	(1)
2014	→ Besa Kavajë (loan)	13	(3)
2014–2016	Giresunspor	57	(21)
2016–2018	Gençlerbirliği	46	(5)
2018–2019	Çaykur Rizespor	50	(25)
2019–2020	Fenerbahçe	32	(15)
2020–2022	Lazio	38	(1)
2022	→ Mallorca (loan)	16	(5)
2022–2026	Mallorca	130	(52)
2026–	Fenerbahçe	12	(7)

International career^{‡}
2013	Kosovo U21	1	(1)
2013–2014	Albania U21	8	(1)
2016–	Kosovo	73	(33)
- * Club domestic league appearances and goals as of 17:56, 21 November 2026 (UTC) ‡ National team caps and goals as of 21:05, 17 November 2026 (UTC)

Vedat Muriqi (born 24 April 1994) is a Kosovar professional footballer who plays as a striker for Süper Lig club Fenerbahçe and the Kosovo national team.

Muriqi began his career with Liria Prizren before moving to Albania, where he played for Teuta Durrës and Besa Kavajë. He later continued his career in Turkey with Giresunspor, Gençlerbirliği and Çaykur Rizespor, gaining prominence for his goalscoring performances. In 2019, he joined Fenerbahçe and later moved to Italian side Lazio in 2020. After a successful loan spell, he signed permanently with Mallorca in 2022.

Originally part of Kosovo's under-21 setup, Muriqi represented Albania's under-21 team in a pair of friendlies before returning to play for the Kosovo national team, where he became the country's all-time top goalscorer.

== Club career ==
=== Teuta Durrës ===
On 14 January 2013, Muriqi had a trial at Kategoria Superiore club Teuta Durrës and after impressing in a friendly match signed a one-and-a-half-year contract with the club. On 4 February 2013, he made his debut with Teuta Durrës in the 2012–13 Albanian Cup quarter-finals against Bylis after being named in the starting line-up. On 23 February 2013, he made his league debut in a 1–1 away draw against Tirana after coming on as a substitute in the 46th minute in place of Daniel Xhafaj.

==== Loan at Besa Kavajë ====
On 5 January 2014, Muriqi was loaned out to Kategoria Superiore club Besa Kavajë until the end of the 2013–14 season. On 1 February 2014, he made his debut against Laçi after coming on as a substitute at 46th minute in place of Shaqir Stafa and scored his side's second goal during a 2–2 home draw.

=== Giresunspor ===
On 18 August 2014, Muriqi signed a two-year contract with TFF First League club Giresunspor. On 14 September 2014, he made his debut in a 0–1 home defeat against Adana Demirspor after coming on as a substitute at 78th minute in place of David Solomon Abwo.

=== Gençlerbirliği ===
On 31 May 2016, Muriqi signed a three-year contract with Süper Lig club Gençlerbirliği. On 21 August 2016, he made his debut against Gaziantepspor after coming on as a substitute at 64th minute in place of Cosmin Matei and scored his side's second goal during a 2–0 home win.

=== Çaykur Rizespor ===
On 11 January 2018, Muriqi signed to TFF First League side Çaykur Rizespor. Ten days later, he made his debut in a match against Manisaspor after being named in the starting line-up and scoring two goals during a 0–3 away win.

=== Fenerbahçe (1st spell) ===
On 7 July 2019, Muriqi completed a transfer to Süper Lig side Fenerbahçe by signing for the next four seasons. One day later, the club confirmed that Muriqi had joined on a permanent transfer. On 19 August 2019, he made his debut against Gaziantep after being named in the starting line-up and scored his side's second goal during a 5–0 home win.

=== Lazio ===
On 15 September 2020, Muriqi signed a five-year deal with Serie A club Lazio. On 17 October 2020, he made his debut in a 3–0 away defeat against Sampdoria after coming on as a substitute at 59th minute in place of Felipe Caicedo. Three days after debut, Muriqi played against Borussia Dortmund in the 2020–21 UEFA Champions League to become the first player of the Kosovo national team to feature in the competition.

=== Mallorca ===
On 31 January 2022, Muriqi was loaned out to La Liga club Mallorca until the end of the 2021–22 season. Mallorca reportedly paid a €1 million loan fee. His debut with Mallorca came two days later in the 2021–22 Copa del Rey quarter-finals against Rayo Vallecano after being named in the starting line-up. Three days after debut, he made his league debut against Cádiz after being named in the starting line-up and scored his side's second goal during a 2–1 home win. On 22 July 2022, the clubs agreed on a permanent transfer and Muriqi signed a five-year contract with Mallorca. He finished the 2022–23 season as his club's top scorer with 15 goals, ranking fifth overall in the league scoring charts.

On 15 February 2026, Muriqi scored his 50th La Liga goal for Mallorca in a 2–1 defeat against Real Betis, becoming the club's second-highest scorer in the competition behind Samuel Eto'o with 54. Two months later, on 12 April, he scored twice in a 3–0 victory over Rayo Vallecano, bringing his La Liga tally to 55 goals and surpassing Eto'o's record. He concluded the season with 23 goals, two goals short of the Pichichi Trophy, yet his club suffered relegation after finishing 18th in the league.

=== Return to Fenerbahçe ===
On 19 June 2026, Muriqi returned to Fenerbahçe on a three-year contract.

On 11 August 2026, he made his second era debut for the team, in a 1–0 away win against Sturm Graz in the 2026–27 UEFA Champions League third qualifying round second match.

On 22 August 2026, he scored his first goal for Fenerbahçe since his return, in a 4-2 victory in Süper Lig against Konyaspor.

On 26 August 2026, in the 2026–27 UEFA Champions League qualifying Play-off round against french side Olympique Lyonnais, he scored his first ever goal in an UEFA club competition, helping his team to win 2-1 and to qualify for the 2026–27 UEFA Champions League league phase.

On 20 September 2026, he played for 69 minutes against Eyüpspor and scored 4 goals; this match marked the highest number of goals he had ever scored in a single Süper Lig game.

On 4 November 2026, he scored third goal of his team that helped his team secure a 3–2 victory over Liverpool, in the 2026–27 UEFA Champions League match played at Chobani Stadium.

== International career ==
=== Under-21 ===
==== Kosovo ====
In June 2013, Muriqi was named as part of the Kosovo U21 squad for 2013 Valais Youth Cup. On 12 June 2013, he made his debut with Kosovo U21 in 2013 Valais Youth Cup semi-final against Ghana U20 after being named in the starting line-up and scored the draw goal in the 41st minute.

==== Albania ====
On 15 October 2013, Muriqi made his debut with Albania U21 in a 2015 UEFA European Under-21 Championship qualification match against Bosnia and Herzegovina U21 after coming on as a substitute at 46th minute in place of Herolind Shala.

=== Senior ===
On 30 August 2016, Muriqi received a call-up from Kosovo for a 2018 FIFA World Cup qualification match against Finland. On 9 October 2016, he made his debut with Kosovo in a 2018 FIFA World Cup qualification match against Ukraine after being named in the starting line-up.

== Style of play ==
Muriqi is a classic target man, known for his aerial ability, hold up play, and strength inside of the penalty area. Former Turkish international and World Cup semi-finalist Rüştü Reçber described Muriqi as an "ideal centre forward", praising his speed in confined spaces in field, aerial dominance, and his team play capabilities, in 2019.

Former Turkish international and World Cup semi-finalist Hakan Ünsal underlined his strength, ball containing and shooting abilities, in 2019. Okan Buruk, former Turkish international, World Cup semi-finalist and former Çaykur Rizespor manager who coached Muriqi stated that Muriqi dramatically improved during his latter season at club, due to his extra trainings, describing him reliable and labelling him "best forward in Turkey in that period".

Former Turkish international and pundit Rıdvan Dilmen praised Muriqi, stating: "There are some forwards. They might be short and quick. Some are powerful. Some are tall, like Peter Crouch, who can get the ball on ground. Muriqi possesses all [of these]. If he could play alongside Alex, he could have scored 25 goals [in a season]", on 21 September 2019.

== Personal life ==
Muriqi was born in Prizren, FR Yugoslavia (now Kosovo) to ethnic Albanian parents. In addition to his Kosovar and Albanian citizenship, he acquired Turkish citizenship in July 2015 under the naturalized name Vedat Muriç. During his time at RCD Mallorca he was nicknamed El Pirata ('The Pirate') for his habitual goal celebration covering one eye. He is a multilingual person who can speak Albanian, Turkish, English, Spanish and Italian fluently.

== Career statistics ==
=== Club ===
As of match played 21 November 2026

Appearances and goals by club, season and competition
Club	Season	League			National cup (Note: Includes Albanian Cup, Turkish Cup, Coppa Italia, Copa del Rey)		Europe		Other		Total	
Club	Season	Division	Apps	Goals	Apps	Goals	Apps	Goals	Apps	Goals	Apps	Goals
Liria Prizren	2011–12	Kosovo Superleague	2	0	0	0	—		—		2	0
Teuta Durrës	2012–13	Kategoria Superiore	6	0	0	0	—		—		6	0
Teuta Durrës	2013–14	Kategoria Superiore	12	1	3	2	—		—		15	3
Teuta Durrës	Total		18	1	3	2	—		—		21	3
Besa Kavajë (loan)	2013–14	Kategoria Superiore	13	3	—		—		—		13	3
Giresunspor	2014–15	TFF First League	24	4	8	2	—		—		32	6
Giresunspor	2015–16	TFF First League	33	17	4	0	—		—		37	17
Giresunspor	Total		57	21	12	2	—		—		69	23
Gençlerbirliği	2016–17	Süper Lig	33	3	7	3	—		—		40	6
Gençlerbirliği	2017–18	Süper Lig	13	2	2	2	—		—		15	4
Gençlerbirliği	Total		46	5	9	5	—		—		55	10
Çaykur Rizespor	2017–18	TFF First League	16	8	—		—		—		16	8
Çaykur Rizespor	2018–19	Süper Lig	34	17	2	0	—		—		36	17
Çaykur Rizespor	Total		50	25	2	0	—		—		52	25
Fenerbahçe	2019–20	Süper Lig	32	15	4	2	—		—		36	17
Lazio	2020–21	Serie A	27	1	2	1	5 (Note: Appearances in UEFA Champions League)	0	—		34	2
Lazio	2021–22	Serie A	11	0	1	0	3 (Note: Appearances in UEFA Europa League)	0	—		15	0
Lazio	Total		38	1	3	1	8	0	—		49	2
Mallorca (loan)	2021–22	La Liga	16	5	1	0	—		—		17	5
Mallorca	2022–23	La Liga	35	15	2	1	—		—		37	16
Mallorca	2023–24	La Liga	29	7	4	0	—		—		33	7
Mallorca	2024–25	La Liga	29	7	1	0	—		1 (Note: Appearance in Supercopa de España)	0	31	7
Mallorca	2025–26	La Liga	36	23	0	0	—		—		36	23
Mallorca	Mallorca total		146	57	8	1	—		1	0	155	58
Fenerbahçe	2026–27	Süper Lig	12	7	0	0	7	2	0	0	19	9
Career total			412	133	40	13	15	2	1	0	468	148

=== International ===
As of match played 17 November 2026

Appearances and goals by national team and year
National team	Year	Apps	Goals
Kosovo	2016	2	0
Kosovo	2017	5	1
Kosovo	2018	9	3
Kosovo	2019	7	4
Kosovo	2020	3	2
Kosovo	2021	11	8
Kosovo	2022	7	5
Kosovo	2023	7	3
Kosovo	2024	7	2
Kosovo	2025	8	4
Kosovo	2026	7	1
Total		73	33

== Honours ==
Çaykur Rizespor

- TFF 1. Lig: 2017–18

Individual

- La Liga Team of the Season: 2025–26
- La Liga Player of the Month: May 2022
