= 2014 Kosovo v Haiti football match =

Kosovo v Haiti
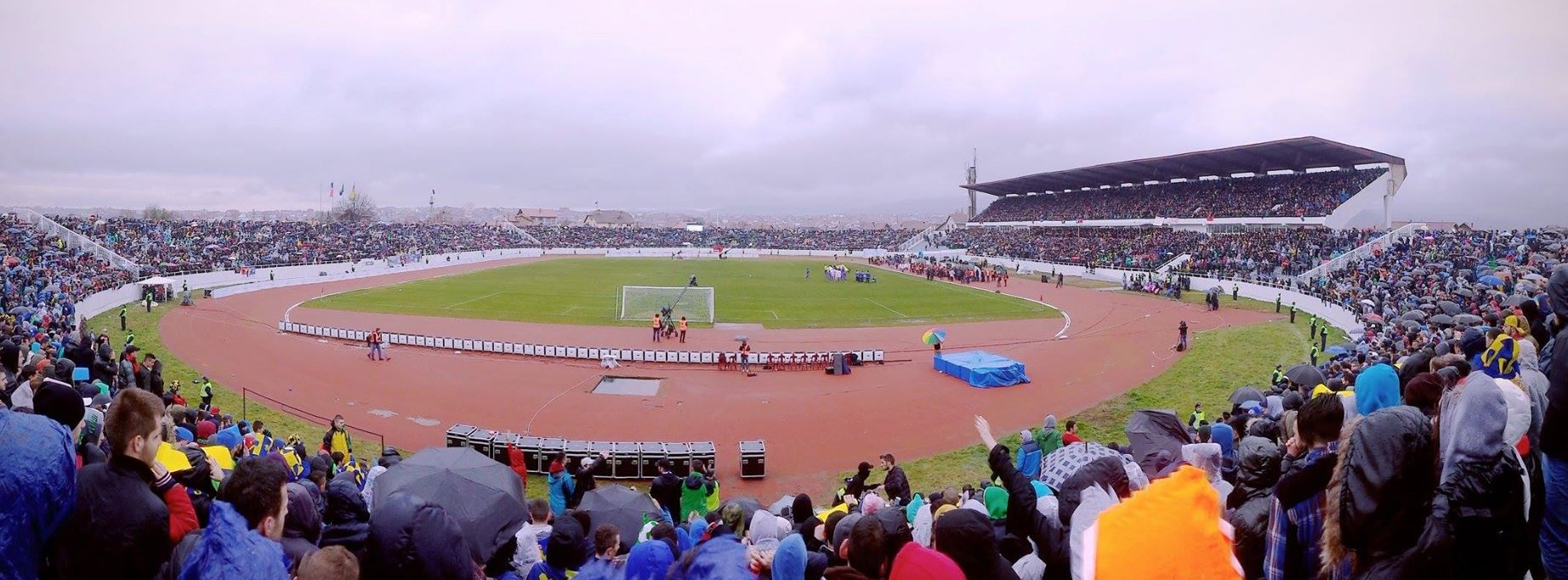
- View of stadium during the friendly match
- Event: Friendly match
Kosovo	Haiti
(Kosovo)	(Haiti)
0	0
- Date: 5 March 2014
- Venue: Adem Jashari Olympic Stadium, Mitrovica, Kosovo
- Referee: Stephan Klossner (Switzerland)
- Attendance: 17,000

Kosovo v Haiti was the first international match involving the Kosovar national football team to be recognised by FIFA, and the first to take place within Kosovo. The match was an international friendly between representative teams from Kosovo and Haiti.

== Background ==
FIFA were lobbied by several prominent Kosovar football personalities including Albania captain Lorik Cana to allow the national team to play against FIFA member associations. Initially, FIFA only allowed Kosovo to play games against FIFA member associations at youth and amateur level, as well as ladies football. In January 2014, later allowed Kosovo to play games against FIFA member associations at full international. Kosovo organised a friendly against Haiti for March 2014.

At the time of the game, Haiti were ranked 79th by FIFA in the FIFA Ranking System. Kosovo were not ranked as they were not a member association of FIFA.

Kosovo's President Atifete Jahjaga and Prime Minister Hashim Thaci were both in attendance.

The game was also Frenchman Marc Collat's first in charge of the Haiti national team.

Several players who had played for other countries had chosen to represent the Kosovo national team. Albanian international goalkeeper Samir Ujkani chose to accept a call-up, as did Finnish international Lum Rexhepi, Norwegian international Ardian Gashi and Swiss international Albert Bunjaku.

== Match details ==
5 March 2014
15:00 (UTC+1)

Kosovo	0–0	Haiti
	Report

Adem Jashari Olympic Stadium
Attendance: 17,000
Referee: Stephan Klossner (Switzerland)

Kosovo	Haiti

Starting line-up	Starting line-up
Samir Ujkani; Loret Sadiku; Avni Pepa; Fanol Perdedaj; Kristian Nushi; Shpëtim Hasani; Enis Alushi; Ardian Gashi; Anel Rashkaj; Ilir Azemi; Albert Bunjaku	Dominique Jean-Zéphirin; Mechack Jérôme; Wilde-Donald Guerrier; Soni Mustivar; Frantz Bertin; Rénald Metelus; Kervens Belfort; Jean-Eudes Maurice; Kevin Lafrance; Gary Ambroise; Duckens Nazon
Substitute appearances	Substitute appearances
Lum Rexhepi; Liridon Krasniqi; Zymer Bytyqi; Faton Toski; Flamur Kastrati	Jean-François James; Jean Sony Alcénat; Stéphane Lambese; Fabien Vorbe
Head coach	Head coach
Albert Bunjaki	Marc Collat

Match Officials

- Referee: (Switzerland) Stephan Klossner
- Assistant Referee 1: (Switzerland) Vital Jobin
- Assistant Referee 2: (Switzerland) Stephane Almeida
- Fourth Official: (Switzerland) Fedayi San

== Aftermath ==
Following the game, the Football Association of Kosovo announced that "Kosovo football has finally broken perennial isolation" and re-iterated their desire to join FIFA in the future. Following the game, the Football Association of Serbia (FSS) wrote to FIFA asking them to reverse their decision on allowing Kosovo to play international games. The FSS complained that Kosovo's players were wearing national symbols on the shirts, that the crowd were chanting anti-Serb songs and that Serbian flags had been burned outside of the ground, and that football was being used political purposes to promote Kosovo as an independent state.
