= José Manuel Copete =

Spanish footballer

Personal information
- Full name: José Manuel Arias Copete
- Date of birth: 10 October 1999 (age 27)
- Place of birth: Écija, Spain
- Height: 1.92 m (6 ft 4 in)
- Position: Centre-back

Team information
- Current team: Valencia
- Number: 3

Youth career
- Écija

Senior career*
Years	Team	Apps	(Gls)
2016–2018	Écija	13	(0)
2018	Córdoba B	11	(0)
2018–2020	Villarreal C	30	(0)
2019–2020	→ Peña Deportiva (loan)	19	(0)
2020–2021	Villarreal B	17	(0)
2021–2022	Ponferradina	28	(1)
2022–2025	Mallorca	72	(2)
2025–	Valencia	21	(1)
- * Club domestic league appearances and goals as of 27 May 2026

José Manuel Arias Copete (born 10 October 1999) is a Spanish professional footballer who plays as a centre-back for La Liga club Valencia.

== Career ==
Born in Écija, Seville, Andalusia, Copete is a Écija Balompié youth graduate. He made his first team debut at the age of just 16 on 19 March 2016, coming on as a late substitute in a 2–0 Tercera División away win against CD Cabecense.

Copete featured sparingly for the Azulinos afterwards, contributing with seven appearances during the 2016–17 campaign as his side achieved promotion to Segunda División B. On 4 January 2018, he moved to Córdoba CF until the end of the season, and featured for the reserves in the fourth division.

On 7 June 2018, Copete signed a three-year contract with fellow Spanish side Villarreal, being initially assigned to the C-team also in the fourth tier. On 22 July of the following year, he was loaned to third division side SCR Peña Deportiva for one year, and upon returning in July 2020, he played for the B-side in the same category.

On 17 June 2021, Copete agreed to a one-year deal with Segunda División side SD Ponferradina. He made his professional debut on 14 August, starting in a 1–0 home win over AD Alcorcón.

On 29 June 2022, Copete returned to La Liga and signed a four-year contract with fellow club Mallorca. He made his debut in the category on 15 August, starting in a 0–0 away draw against Athletic Bilbao, and scored his first goal on 4 June 2023, in a 3–0 home win over Rayo Vallecano.

On 28 July 2025, Copete left Mallorca, singing for fellow top-tier side Valencia on a four-year deal, effective until June 2029.
