= 2013 Valais Youth Cup =

- 2013 Valais Youth Cup official logo

Tournament details
- Host country: Switzerland
- Dates: 12–15 June 2013
- Teams: 4 (from 3 confederations)
- Venue: 1 (in 1 host city)

Final positions
- Champions: Brazil (1st title)
- Runners-up: Ghana
- Third place: Egypt
- Fourth place: Kosovo

Tournament statistics
- Matches played: 4
- Goals scored: 15 (3.75 per match)

The Valais Youth Cup was a two-day international football tournament that featured four teams. It was played at the Complexe Sportif du Bout du Lac in Le Bouveret, Switzerland.

== Teams ==
In February 2013, FIFA gave Kosovo permission to play games against FIFA members' youth teams. This competition saw Kosovo compete in their first officially recognised fixture when they played Ghana, on 14 June 2013. The tournament was used to prepare Egypt and Ghana for the 2013 FIFA U-20 World Cup competition.

Teams	Confederation	Ref.
Brazil	CONMEBOL	
Egypt	CAF	
Ghana	CAF	
Kosovo	UEFA	

=== Squads ===
==== Kosovo ====
Kosovo

Coach: (Kosovo) Rafet Prekazi

No.	Pos.	Player	Date of birth (age)	Club
	GK	Altik Muhaxheri	9 January 1992 (aged 21)	(Football Federation of Kosovo) Vëllaznimi
	GK	Florent Zymeri	27 October 1992 (aged 20)	(Football Federation of Kosovo) Vushtrria
	DF	Lorik Maxhuni	2 July 1992 (aged 20)	(Football Federation of Kosovo) Drenica
	DF	Arjan Jasiqi	2 September 1992 (aged 20)	(Football Federation of Kosovo) Deçani
	DF	Armend Thaqi	10 October 1992 (aged 20)	(Football Federation of Kosovo) Hajvalia
	DF	Përparim Islami	1 May 1993 (aged 20)	(Football Federation of Kosovo) Hysi
	DF	Alban Lekaj	4 January 1994 (aged 19)	(German Football Association) Eintracht Frankfurt
	MF	Argjend Mustafa (Captain)	30 August 1992 (aged 20)	(Albanian Football Federation) Besa Kavajë
	MF	Flamur Shala	28 November 1992 (aged 20)	(Football Federation of Kosovo) Feronikeli
	MF	Florent Avdyli	10 July 1993 (aged 19)	(Football Federation of Kosovo) Hajvalia
	MF	Pleurat Hajdini	21 January 1994 (aged 19)	(Football Federation of Kosovo) Hysi
	MF	Armand Drevina	3 February 1994 (aged 19)	(German Football Association) Alemannia Aachen
	MF	Drilon Musaj	11 September 1994 (aged 18)	(Football Federation of Kosovo) Trepça'89
	MF	Argjend Malaj	16 October 1994 (aged 18)	(Football Federation of Kosovo) Prishtina
	MF	Milot Rashica	28 June 1996 (aged 16)	(Football Federation of Kosovo) Vushtrria
	MF	Bersant Celina	9 September 1996 (aged 16)	(The Football Association) Manchester City
	FW	Gentrit Begolli	7 August 1990 (aged 22)	(Football Federation of Kosovo) Prishtina
	FW	Vedat Muriqi	24 April 1994 (aged 19)	(Albanian Football Federation) Teuta Durrës

== Bracket ==
Semi-finals; 12 June
17:00 CEST - Le Bouveret
Brazil	1
Egypt	0
19:30 CEST - Le Bouveret
Ghana (p)	2 (5)
Kosovo	2 (4)

Final; 15 June
18:00 CEST - Le Bouveret
Brazil (p)	1 (4)
Ghana	1 (3)
Third place
15:30 CEST - Le Bouveret
Egypt	8
Kosovo	0

== Matches ==
=== Semi-finals ===
12 June 2013
17:00 CEST

Brazil	1–0	Egypt
Ademilson 60'	Report

Complexe Sportif du Bout du Lac, Le Bouveret
Referee: Pascal Erlachner (Switzerland)

12 June 2013
19:30 CEST

Ghana	2–2	Kosovo
Narh 7'; Addico 61'	Report	Muriqi 41'; Musaj 73'
Penalties
	5–4

Complexe Sportif du Bout du Lac, Le Bouveret
Referee: Fedayi San (Switzerland)

=== Third place play-off ===
15 June 2013
15:30 CEST

Egypt	8–0	Kosovo
Refaat 5', 55'; Koka 25'; Metwalli 47'; Kahraba 56', 61'; Bassam 75', 85'	Report

Complexe Sportif du Bout du Lac, Le Bouveret
Referee: Urs Schnyder (Switzerland)

=== Final ===
15 June 2013
18:00 CEST

Brazil	1–1	Ghana
Vinícius Araújo 25'	Report	Assifuah 90+4'
Penalties
	4–3

Complexe Sportif du Bout du Lac, Le Bouveret
Referee: Sandro Schärer (Switzerland)
