= Shpëtim Hasani =

Kosovar footballer

Personal information
- Full name: Shpëtim Hasani
- Date of birth: 10 August 1982 (age 44)
- Place of birth: Gjilan, SFR Yugoslavia
- Height: 1.83 m (6 ft 0 in)
- Position: Striker

Team information
- Current team: Mariebergs IK

Youth career
- 1997–2000: Bursaspor

Senior career*
Years	Team	Apps	(Gls)
2000–2004	Bursaspor	0	(0)
2002–2004	→ KF Drita (loan)		
2004–2005	Sakaryaspor	1	(0)
2005	KF Drita		
2005–2006	Kalmar FF	12	(1)
2005	→ Degerfors IF (loan)	10	(5)
2006–2008	Degerfors IF	60	(13)
2009	IK Sirius	28	(10)
2010–2012	IFK Norrköping	75	(25)
2012–2014	Örebro SK	50	(21)
2014–2015	Górnik Łęczna	29	(5)
2015–2016	GIF Sundsvall	24	(2)
2016–2017	Degerfors IF	35	(10)
2018	Nora BK	23	(3)
2019–2020	Karlslunds IF	24	(7)
2020–	Mariebergs IK	53	(39)

International career
2005–2015	Kosovo	6	(1)
- * Club domestic league appearances and goals as of 5 October 2024

Shpëtim Hasani (born 10 August 1982) is a Kosovar footballer who plays for Mariebergs IK as a striker.

== Club career ==
He began his professional career in 2000 with Süper Lig side Bursaspor, where he made no single appearance and had loan at KF Drita of the Superleague. In 2004, he signed Sakaryaspor, where he spent the next season and made his Süper Lig debut. After a short spell with KF Drita in 2005 he moved to Sweden, where he played for Kalmar FF, Degerfors IF, IK Sirius, IFK Norrköping, Örebro SK, GIF Sundsvall, Nora BK and Karlslunds IF HFK. During 2014-15 season Hasani played for Górnik Łęczna, making 29 league appearances and scoring 5 goals in the Ekstraklasa.

== International career ==
Hasani earned his first cap for Kosovo on 5 March 2014, in the 0–0 draw against Haiti, which was the first international match involving the Kosovar national football team to be recognised by FIFA. Between 2014 and 2015 he was capped 4 times.

== Career statistics ==
=== International ===
Appearances and goals by national team and year
National team	Year	Apps	Goals
Kosovo	2005	1	0
Kosovo	2006	–	
Kosovo	2007	–	
Kosovo	2008	–	
Kosovo	2009	–	
Kosovo	2010	1	1
Kosovo	2011	–	
Kosovo	2012	–	
Kosovo	2013	–	
Kosovo	2014	2	0
Kosovo	2015	2	0
Total		6	1

Scores and results list Kosovo's goal tally first, score column indicates score after each Hasani goal.

List of international goals scored by Shpëtim Hasani
No.	Date	Venue	Opponent	Score	Result	Competition
1	23 March 2011	Pristina City Stadium, Pristina, Kosovo	Albania	1–1	2–3	Friendly

== Honours ==
KF Drita

- Superleague: 2002–03
