= List of Spanish football transfers summer 2019 =

This is a list of Spanish football transfers for the summer sale prior to the 2019–20 season of La Liga. Only moves from La Liga are listed.

The summer transfer window began on 1 July 2019, although a few transfers were announced prior to that date, the transferred players will not officially become part of their new club until the window's opening. The window closed at midnight on 2 September 2019. Players without a club can join one at any time, either during or in between transfer windows. Clubs below La Liga level can also sign players on loan at any time. If needed, clubs can sign a goalkeeper on an emergency loan, if all others are unavailable.

== Transfers ==
=== Alavés ===
Manager: (Spain) Asier Garitano (1st season)

==== In ====
Date	Player	From	Type	Fee	Ref
30 June 2019	(Angola) Anderson	(France) Sochaux	Loan return		
30 June 2019	(Bosnia and Herzegovina) Ermedin Demirović	Almería	Loan return		
30 June 2019	(Spain) Adrián Diéguez	Huesca	Loan return		
30 June 2019	(Spain) Javi Muñoz	Oviedo	Loan return		
30 June 2019	(Spain) Nando	Extremadura	Loan return		
30 June 2019	(Spain) Rafa Navarro	(France) Sochaux	Loan return		
30 June 2019	(Colombia) Daniel Torres	Albacete	Loan return		
1 July 2019	(Cameroon) Jeando Fuchs	(France) Sochaux	Transfer	Undisclosed	
1 July 2019	(Spain) Saúl García	Deportivo La Coruña	Transfer	Free	
1 July 2019	(Argentina) Ramón Mierez	(Argentina) Tigre	Transfer	€2.2M	
1 July 2019	(Spain) Lucas Pérez	(England) West Ham United	Transfer	€2.3M	
1 July 2019	(Spain) Luis Rioja	Almería	Transfer	€2M	
1 July 2019	(Benin) Olivier Verdon	(France) Sochaux	Transfer	Undisclosed	
4 July 2019	(Spain) Pere Pons	Girona	Transfer	€2M	
15 July 2019	(Spain) Joselu	(England) Newcastle United	Transfer	€2.2M	
19 July 2019	(Spain) Tachi	Atlético Madrid B	Transfer	Free	
28 July 2019	(Spain) Aleix Vidal	Sevilla	Loan		
30 August 2019	(Scotland) Oliver Burke	(England) West Bromwich Albion	Loan		
2 September 2019	(Argentina) Lisandro Magallán	(Netherlands) Ajax	Loan		

==== Out ====
Date	Player	To	Type	Fee	Ref
30 June 2019	(Spain) Borja Bastón	(Wales) Swansea City	Loan return		
30 June 2019	(Spain) Álex Blanco	Valencia	Loan return		
30 June 2019	(Serbia) Darko Brašanac	Real Betis	Loan return		
30 June 2019	(Argentina) Jonathan Calleri	(Uruguay) Deportivo Maldonado	Loan return		
30 June 2019	(Japan) Takashi Inui	Real Betis	Loan return		
30 June 2019	(Spain) Jony	Málaga	Loan return		
30 June 2019	(Uruguay) Diego Rolán	Deportivo La Coruña	Loan return		
9 July 2019	(Spain) Antonio Cristian	Fuenlabrada	Contract termination		
11 July 2019	(Spain) Carlos Vigaray	Zaragoza	Transfer	Free	
27 July 2019	(Angola) Anderson	Fuenlabrada	Loan		
28 July 2019	(Spain) Adrián Diéguez	Alcorcón	Loan		
5 August 2019	(Argentina) Ramón Mierez	Tenerife	Loan		
16 August 2019	(Ghana) Patrick Twumasi	(Turkey) Gazişehir Gaziantep	Loan		
24 August 2019	(Chile) Guillermo Maripán	(France) Monaco	Transfer	€18M	
2 September 2019	(Bosnia and Herzegovina) Ermedin Demirović	(Switzerland) St. Gallen	Loan		
2 September 2019	(Spain) Saúl García	Rayo Vallecano	Loan		
2 September 2019	(Spain) Nando	(Poland) Arka Gdynia	Transfer	Free	
2 September 2019	(Benin) Olivier Verdon	(Belgium) Eupen	Loan		

=== Athletic Bilbao ===
Manager: (Spain) Gaizka Garitano (2nd season)

==== In ====
Date	Player	From	Type	Fee	Ref
30 June 2019	(Spain) Xabier Etxeita	Huesca	Loan return		
30 June 2019	(Romania) Cristian Ganea	Numancia	Loan return		
30 June 2019	(Spain) Sabin Merino	Leganés	Loan return		
30 June 2019	(Spain) Mikel Vesga	Leganés	Loan return		
1 July 2019	(Spain) Jokin Ezkieta	Barcelona B	Transfer	Free	

==== Out ====
Date	Player	To	Type	Fee	Ref
1 July 2019	(Spain) Sabin Merino	Leganés	Transfer	Free	
1 July 2019	(Spain) Álex Remiro	Real Sociedad	Transfer	Free	
7 July 2019	(Spain) Mikel Rico	Huesca	Transfer	Free	
8 July 2019	(Spain) Ander Iturraspe	Espanyol	Transfer	Free	
9 August 2019	(Spain) Peru Nolaskoain	Deportivo La Coruña	Loan		
13 August 2019	(Spain) Xabier Etxeita	Getafe	Transfer	Free	
9 September 2019	(Spain) Markel Susaeta	(Japan) Gamba Osaka	Transfer	Free	

=== Atlético Madrid ===
Manager: (Argentina) Diego Simeone (9th season)

==== In ====
Date	Player	From	Type	Fee	Ref
30 June 2019	(Spain) Héctor Hernández	Rayo Majadahonda	Loan return		
30 June 2019	(Portugal) André Moreira	(Portugal) Feirense	Loan return		
30 June 2019	(Argentina) Luciano Vietto	(England) Fulham	Loan return		
30 June 2019	(Croatia) Šime Vrsaljko	(Italy) Inter Milan	Loan return		
30 June 2019	(Argentina) Axel Werner	Málaga	Loan return		
1 July 2019	(Argentina) Nicolás Ibáñez	(Mexico) Atlético San Luis	Transfer	Undisclosed	
1 July 2019	(Spain) Marcos Llorente	Real Madrid	Transfer	€40M	
3 July 2019	(Brazil) Felipe	(Portugal) Porto	Transfer	€20M	
3 July 2019	(Portugal) João Félix	(Portugal) Benfica	Transfer	€126M	
3 July 2019	(Mexico) Héctor Herrera	(Portugal) Porto	Transfer	Free	
7 July 2019	(Brazil) Renan Lodi	(Brazil) Athletico Paranaense	Transfer	Undisclosed	
11 July 2019	(Serbia) Ivan Šaponjić	(Portugal) Benfica	Transfer	Undisclosed	
17 July 2019	(England) Kieran Trippier	(England) Tottenham Hotspur	Transfer	€22M	
18 July 2019	(Spain) Mario Hermoso	Espanyol	Transfer	€25M	

==== Out ====
Date	Player	To	Type	Fee	Ref
1 July 2019	(Uruguay) Diego Godín	(Italy) Inter Milan	Transfer	Free	
1 July 2019	(France) Lucas Hernandez	(Germany) Bayern Munich	Transfer	€80M	
1 July 2019	(Argentina) Nicolás Ibáñez	(Mexico) Atlético San Luis	Loan		
1 July 2019	(Portugal) Gelson Martins	(France) Monaco	Buyout clause	€30M	
1 July 2019	(Ghana) Bernard Mensah	(Turkey) Kayserispor	Buyout clause	€3M	
1 July 2019	(Argentina) Luciano Vietto	(Portugal) Sporting CP	Transfer	€7.5M	
1 July 2019	(Argentina) Axel Werner	(Mexico) Atlético San Luis	Loan		
3 July 2019	(Spain) Rodri	(England) Manchester City	Transfer	€70M	
10 July 2019	(Argentina) Nehuén Pérez	(Portugal) Famalicão	Loan		
12 July 2019	(France) Antoine Griezmann	Barcelona	Transfer	€120M	
18 July 2019	(Portugal) André Moreira	(Portugal) Belenenses	Transfer	Free	
23 July 2019	(Brazil) Filipe Luís	(Brazil) Flamengo	Transfer	Free	
28 July 2019	(Spain) Héctor Hernández	Fuenlabrada	Loan		
3 August 2019	(Spain) Juanfran	(Brazil) São Paulo	Transfer	Free	
2 September 2019	(Croatia) Nikola Kalinić	(Italy) Roma	Loan		

=== Barcelona ===
Manager: (Spain) Ernesto Valverde (3rd season)

==== In ====
Date	Player	From	Type	Fee	Ref
30 June 2019	(Brazil) Douglas	(Turkey) Sivasspor	Loan return		
30 June 2019	(Spain) Adrián Ortolá	Deportivo La Coruña	Loan return		
30 June 2019	(Spain) Denis Suárez	(England) Arsenal	Loan return		
1 July 2019	(Netherlands) Frenkie de Jong	(Netherlands) Ajax	Transfer	€75M	
1 July 2019	(Brazil) Emerson Royal	(Brazil) Atlético Mineiro	Transfer	€12M	
1 July 2019	(Brazil) Neto	Valencia	Transfer	€26M	
12 July 2019	(France) Antoine Griezmann	Atlético Madrid	Transfer	€120M	
16 July 2019	(Spain) Marc Cucurella	Eibar	Transfer	€4M	
4 August 2019	(Spain) Junior Firpo	Real Betis	Transfer	€18M	

==== Out ====
Date	Player	To	Type	Fee	Ref
30 June 2019	(Ghana) Kevin-Prince Boateng	(Italy) Sassuolo	Loan return		
30 June 2019	(Colombia) Jeison Murillo	Valencia	Loan return		
1 July 2019	(Netherlands) Jasper Cillessen	Valencia	Transfer	€35M	
1 July 2019	(Brazil) Emerson Royal	Real Betis	Transfer	€6M	
1 July 2019	(Portugal) André Gomes	(England) Everton	Buyout clause	€25M	
1 July 2019	(Spain) Denis Suárez	Celta Vigo	Transfer	€12.9M	
12 July 2019	(Spain) Adrián Ortolá	Tenerife	Transfer	Free	
18 July 2019	(Spain) Marc Cucurella	Getafe	Loan		
27 July 2019	(Brazil) Douglas	(Turkey) Beşiktaş	Transfer	Free	
27 July 2019	(Belgium) Thomas Vermaelen	(Japan) Vissel Kobe	Transfer	Free	
2 August 2019	(Brazil) Malcom	(Russia) Zenit St. Petersburg	Transfer	€40M	
19 August 2019	(Brazil) Philippe Coutinho	(Germany) Bayern Munich	Loan	€8.5M	
2 September 2019	(Brazil) Rafinha	Celta Vigo	Loan	€1.5M	

=== Celta Vigo ===
Manager: (Spain) Fran Escribá (2nd season)

==== In ====
Date	Player	From	Type	Fee	Ref
30 June 2019	(Guadeloupe) Claudio Beauvue	(France) Caen	Loan return		
30 June 2019	(Germany) Dennis Eckert	(Netherlands) Excelsior	Loan return		
30 June 2019	(Slovakia) Róbert Mazáň	(Italy) Venezia	Loan return		
30 June 2019	(Argentina) Facundo Roncaglia	Valencia	Loan return		
1 July 2019	(Uruguay) Gabriel Fernández	(Uruguay) Peñarol	Transfer	€3.5M	
1 July 2019	(Spain) Denis Suárez	Barcelona	Transfer	€12.9M	
11 July 2019	(Ghana) Joseph Aidoo	(Belgium) Genk	Transfer	€8M	
14 July 2019	(Spain) Santi Mina (Note: Permanent transfer)	Valencia	Trade	Maxi Gómez	
14 July 2019	(Spain) Jorge Sáenz (Note: On loan until 30 June 2020)	Valencia	Trade	Maxi Gómez	
14 August 2019	(Senegal) Pape Cheikh Diop	(France) Lyon	Loan	€500K	
2 September 2019	(Brazil) Rafinha	Barcelona	Loan	€1.5M	

==== Out ====
Date	Player	To	Type	Fee	Ref
30 June 2019	(Algeria) Ryad Boudebouz	Real Betis	Loan return		
30 June 2019	(Morocco) Sofiane Boufal	(England) Southampton	Loan return		
30 June 2019	(Netherlands) Wesley Hoedt	(England) Southampton	Loan return		
1 July 2019	(Argentina) Gustavo Cabral	(Mexico) Pachuca	Transfer	Free	
10 July 2019	(Denmark) Mathias Jensen	(England) Brentford	Transfer	€3.8M	
12 July 2019	(Denmark) Andrew Hjulsager	(Belgium) Oostende	Transfer	€500K	
14 July 2019	(Uruguay) Maxi Gómez	Valencia	Trade	€14.5M + Santi Mina + Jorge Sáenz	
24 July 2019	(Slovakia) Róbert Mazáň	Tenerife	Loan		
31 July 2019	(Turkey) Emre Mor	(Turkey) Galatasaray	Loan	€300K	
8 August 2019	(Argentina) Facundo Roncaglia	Osasuna	Transfer	€250K	
21 August 2019	(Serbia) Nemanja Radoja	Levante	Transfer	Free	
27 August 2019	(Spain) Jozabed	Girona	Loan		
2 September 2019	(Germany) Dennis Eckert	(Germany) FC Ingolstadt	Transfer	Free	

=== Eibar ===
Manager: (Spain) José Luis Mendilibar (5th season)

==== In ====
Date	Player	From	Type	Fee	Ref
30 June 2019	(Spain) José Antonio Martínez	Granada	Loan return		
30 June 2019	(Spain) Nano	Tenerife	Loan return		
30 June 2019	(Spain) Yoel	Valladolid	Loan return		
1 July 2019	(Spain) Pedro Bigas	Las Palmas	Buyout clause	€3M	
1 July 2019	(Spain) Marc Cucurella	Barcelona B	Buyout clause	€2M	
1 July 2019	(Spain) Álvaro Tejero	Real Madrid Castilla	Transfer	Free	
1 July 2019	(Argentina) Esteban Burgos	Alcorcón	Transfer	Free	
2 July 2019	(Spain) Asier Benito	Bilbao Athletic	Transfer	Free	
3 July 2019	(Spain) Rubén Lobato	Oviedo B	Transfer	Free	
5 July 2019	(Spain) Rober Correa	Cádiz	Transfer	Free	
7 July 2019	(Spain) Roberto Olabe	Atlético Madrid B	Transfer	Undisclosed	
13 July 2019	(Spain) Edu Expósito	Deportivo La Coruña	Transfer	€4M	
14 July 2019	(Spain) Quique	Deportivo La Coruña	Transfer	€3.3M	
24 July 2019	(Japan) Takashi Inui	Real Betis	Transfer	€2M	

==== Out ====
Date	Player	To	Type	Fee	Ref
30 June 2019	(Spain) Marc Cardona	Barcelona B	Loan return		
1 July 2019	(Spain) Pablo Hervías	Valladolid	Buyout clause	€1M	
1 July 2019	(Spain) Joan Jordán	Sevilla	Transfer	€14M	
1 July 2019	(Spain) Pere Milla	Elche	Transfer	Free	
4 July 2019	(Spain) Rubén Peña	Villarreal	Transfer	€8M	
11 July 2019	(Spain) Unai Elgezabal	Alcorcón	Contract termination		
16 July 2019	(Spain) Marc Cucurella	Barcelona	Transfer	€4M	
4 August 2019	(Spain) Roberto Olabe	Albacete	Loan		
7 August 2019	(Spain) Asier Benito	Ponferradina	Loan		
10 August 2019	(Spain) José Antonio Martínez	Granada	Loan		
13 August 2019	(Spain) Nano	Cádiz	Loan		
18 August 2019	(Spain) Rubén Lobato	Unattached	Released		
20 August 2019	(Spain) Jordi Calavera	Girona	Loan		
2 September 2019	(Spain) Asier Riesgo	Girona	Transfer	Free	

=== Espanyol ===
Manager: (Spain) David Gallego (1st season)

==== In ====
Date	Player	From	Type	Fee	Ref
30 June 2019	(Spain) Pipa	Gimnàstic	Loan return		
30 June 2019	(Spain) Álvaro Vázquez	Zaragoza	Loan return		
6 July 2019	(Colombia) Bernardo Espinosa	Girona	Loan		
8 July 2019	(Spain) Ander Iturraspe	Athletic Bilbao	Transfer	Free	
14 July 2019	(Argentina) Matías Vargas	(Argentina) Vélez Sarsfield	Transfer	€10.5M	
19 July 2019	(Spain) Andrés Prieto	Leganés	Transfer	Free	
9 August 2019	(Spain) Fernando Calero	Valladolid	Transfer	€8M	
21 August 2019	(France) Sébastien Corchia	Sevilla	Loan		
26 August 2019	(Argentina) Jonathan Calleri	(Uruguay) Deportivo Maldonado	Loan		

==== Out ====
Date	Player	To	Type	Fee	Ref
30 June 2019	(Venezuela) Roberto Rosales	Málaga	Loan return		
30 June 2019	(Guinea-Bissau) Alfa Semedo	(Portugal) Benfica	Loan return		
1 July 2019	(Spain) Aarón Martín	(Germany) Mainz 05	Buyout clause	€6M	
1 July 2019	(Spain) Roberto	(England) West Ham United	Transfer	Free	
10 July 2019	(Spain) Álvaro Vázquez	Sporting Gijón	Transfer	Free	
18 July 2019	(Spain) Mario Hermoso	Atlético Madrid	Transfer	€25M	
23 July 2019	(Paraguay) Hernán Pérez	(Qatar) Al Ahli	Transfer	Undisclosed	
1 August 2019	(Costa Rica) Óscar Duarte	Levante	Transfer	Free	
14 August 2019	(Spain) Borja Iglesias	Real Betis	Transfer	€28M	
17 August 2019	(Spain) Álex López	Lugo	Loan		

=== Getafe ===
Manager: (Spain) José Bordalás (4th season)

==== In ====
Date	Player	From	Type	Fee	Ref
30 June 2019	(Spain) Iván Alejo	Málaga	Loan return		
30 June 2019	(Spain) Chuli	Extremadura	Loan return		
30 June 2019	(Spain) Robert Ibáñez	Osasuna	Loan return		
30 June 2019	(Spain) Álvaro Jiménez	Sporting Gijón	Loan return		
30 June 2019	(Spain) José Lazo	Lugo	Loan return		
30 June 2019	(Serbia) Filip Manojlović	(Greece) Panionios	Loan return		
30 June 2019	(Republic of the Congo) Merveil Ndockyt	Barcelona B	Loan return		
1 July 2019	(Spain) Raúl García	Girona	Transfer	Free	
1 July 2019	(Scotland) Jack Harper	Málaga	Transfer	€1.5M	
8 July 2019	(Spain) Enric Gallego	Huesca	Transfer	€6M	
18 July 2019	(Spain) Marc Cucurella	Barcelona	Loan		
24 July 2019	(Cameroon) Allan Nyom	(England) West Bromwich Albion	Transfer	Undisclosed	
3 August 2019	(Morocco) Fayçal Fajr	(France) Caen	Transfer	€1.5M	
13 August 2019	(Spain) Xabier Etxeita	Athletic Bilbao	Transfer	Free	
29 August 2019	(Spain) David Timor	Las Palmas	Transfer	Free	
2 September 2019	(Spain) Jason	Valencia	Loan		
2 September 2019	(Brazil) Kenedy	(England) Chelsea	Loan		

==== Out ====
Date	Player	To	Type	Fee	Ref
30 June 2019	(Uruguay) Sebastián Cristóforo	(Italy) Fiorentina	Loan return		
30 June 2019	(Guadeloupe) Dimitri Foulquier	(England) Watford	Loan return		
30 June 2019	(Spain) Samuel Sáiz	(England) Leeds United	Loan return		
12 July 2019	(Spain) Álvaro Jiménez	Albacete	Loan		
14 July 2019	(Japan) Gaku Shibasaki	Deportivo La Coruña	Transfer	Free	
25 July 2019	(Spain) Miguel Ángel	Fuenlabrada	Loan		
10 August 2019	(Scotland) Jack Harper	Alcorcón	Loan		
12 August 2019	(Spain) Robert Ibáñez	Osasuna	Transfer	€2M	
10 August 2019	(Spain) Ignasi Miquel	Girona	Loan		
20 August 2019	(Spain) José Lazo	Almería	Loan	€250K	
22 August 2019	(Spain) Rubén Yáñez	Huesca	Loan		
28 August 2019	(Spain) Chuli	Recreativo	Transfer	Free	
28 August 2019	(Republic of the Congo) Merveil Ndockyt	(Croatia) Osijek	Loan		
30 August 2019	(Spain) Iván Alejo	Cádiz	Loan		

=== Granada ===
Manager: (Spain) Diego Martínez (2nd season)

==== In ====
Date	Player	From	Type	Fee	Ref
30 June 2019	(Spain) Raúl Baena	(Australia) Melbourne Victory	Loan return		
30 June 2019	(Peru) Sergio Peña	(Portugal) Tondela	Loan return		
30 June 2019	(Spain) Pablo Vázquez	Cultural Leonesa	Loan return		
1 July 2019	(Colombia) Neyder Lozano	Elche	Transfer	Free	
1 July 2019	(Spain) Fede Vico	Leganés	Buyout clause	€250K	
14 July 2019	(Portugal) Domingos Duarte	(Portugal) Sporting CP	Transfer	Undisclosed	
15 July 2019	(Spain) Roberto Soldado	(Turkey) Fenerbahçe	Transfer	Free	
18 July 2019	(Cameroon) Yan Brice Eteki	Sevilla	Transfer	€1M	
26 July 2019	(Venezuela) Yangel Herrera	(England) Manchester City	Loan		
28 July 2019	(Venezuela) Darwin Machís	(Italy) Udinese	Transfer	€3M	
10 August 2019	(Spain) José Antonio Martínez	Eibar	Loan		
14 August 2019	(Spain) Carlos Fernández	Sevilla	Loan		
30 August 2019	(Turkey) İsmail Köybaşı	(Turkey) Fenerbahçe	Transfer	Free	
2 September 2019	(France) Maxime Gonalons	(Italy) Roma	Loan		

==== Out ====
Date	Player	To	Type	Fee	Ref
30 June 2019	(Spain) José Antonio Martínez	Eibar	Loan return		
30 June 2019	(Spain) Dani Ojeda	Leganés	Loan return		
30 June 2019	(Spain) Alejandro Pozo	Sevilla Atlético	Loan return		
30 June 2019	(Spain) Fede San Emeterio	Valladolid	Loan return		
5 July 2019	(Spain) Adri Castellano	Numancia	Transfer	Undisclosed	
5 July 2019	(Spain) José Antonio González	Córdoba	Loan		
23 July 2019	(Spain) Pablo Vázquez	Badajoz	Transfer	Free	
3 August 2019	(Peru) Sergio Peña	(Netherlands) Emmen	Transfer	Free	
30 August 2019	(Spain) Rodri	Unattached	Released		
2 September 2019	(Spain) Bernardo Cruz	Alcorcón	Loan		
5 September 2019	(Spain) Raúl Baena	(Greece) Atromitos	Transfer	Free	

=== Leganés ===
Manager: (Argentina) Mauricio Pellegrino (2nd season)

==== In ====
Date	Player	From	Type	Fee	Ref
30 June 2019	(Argentina) Facundo García	(Cyprus) AEK Larnaca	Loan return		
30 June 2019	(Ivory Coast) Mamadou Koné	Málaga	Loan return		
30 June 2019	(Ghana) Owusu Kwabena	Salamanca	Loan return		
30 June 2019	(Venezuela) Josua Mejías	Gimnàstic	Loan return		
30 June 2019	(Spain) Dani Ojeda	Granada	Loan return		
1 July 2019	(Spain) Juan Muñoz	Alcorcón	Transfer	€1M	
1 July 2019	(Argentina) Jonathan Silva	(Portugal) Sporting CP	Buyout clause	€3M	
1 July 2019	(Brazil) André Grandi	Internacional Madrid	Transfer	Free	
4 July 2019	(Spain) Aitor Ruibal	Real Betis	Loan		
4 July 2019	(Argentina) Federico Varela	(Portugal) Porto B	Transfer	Undisclosed	
5 July 2019	(Spain) Juan Soriano	Sevilla	Loan		
8 July 2019	(Spain) Álex Martín	Real Madrid Castilla	Transfer	Undisclosed	
24 July 2019	(Denmark) Martin Braithwaite	(England) Middlesbrough	Buyout clause	Undisclosed	
24 July 2019	(Spain) Marc Navarro	(England) Watford	Loan		
24 July 2019	(Venezuela) Roberto Rosales	Málaga	Transfer	€1.2M	
13 August 2019	(Spain) Roque Mesa	Sevilla	Loan		
13 August 2019	(Nigeria) Kenneth Omeruo	(England) Chelsea	Transfer	€5M	
15 August 2019	(Nigeria) Chidozie Awaziem	(Portugal) Porto	Loan		
1 September 2019	(Argentina) Guido Carrillo	(England) Southampton	Loan		
2 September 2019	(Spain) Christian Rivera	Las Palmas	Loan		
2 September 2019	(Portugal) Kévin Rodrigues	Real Sociedad	Loan		

==== Out ====
Date	Player	To	Type	Fee	Ref
30 June 2019	(Argentina) Guido Carrillo	(England) Southampton	Loan return		
30 June 2019	(Spain) Juanfran	Deportivo La Coruña	Loan return		
30 June 2019	(Ukraine) Andriy Lunin	Real Madrid	Loan return		
30 June 2019	(Spain) Sabin Merino	Athletic Bilbao	Loan return		
30 June 2019	(Cameroon) Allan Nyom	(England) West Bromwich Albion	Loan return		
30 June 2019	(Nigeria) Kenneth Omeruo	(England) Chelsea	Loan return		
30 June 2019	(Spain) Óscar	Real Madrid Castilla	Loan return		
30 June 2019	(Mexico) Diego Reyes	(Turkey) Fenerbahçe	Loan return		
30 June 2019	(Uruguay) Michael Santos	Málaga	Loan return		
30 June 2019	(Spain) Mikel Vesga	Athletic Bilbao	Loan return		
1 July 2019	(Morocco) Nabil El Zhar	(Qatar) Al Ahli	Transfer	Free	
1 July 2019	(Argentina) Ezequiel Muñoz	(Argentina) Lanús	Transfer	Undisclosed	
1 July 2019	(Spain) Fede Vico	Granada	Buyout clause	€250K	
16 July 2019	(Spain) Dani Ojeda	Albacete	Loan		
19 July 2019	(Ivory Coast) Mamadou Koné	Deportivo La Coruña	Loan		
19 July 2019	(Spain) Andrés Prieto	Espanyol	Transfer	Free	
13 August 2019	(Spain) Gerard Gumbau	Girona	Transfer	€500K	
16 August 2019	(Venezuela) Josua Mejías	Atlético Madrid B	Loan		
22 August 2019	(Ghana) Owusu Kwabena	Córdoba	Loan		
29 August 2019	(Argentina) Facundo García	(Cyprus) AEK Larnaca	Loan		
31 August 2019	(Spain) Álex Martín	Cartagena	Loan		
2 September 2019	(Spain) Juan Muñoz	Almería	Loan	€270K	

=== Levante ===
Manager: (Spain) Paco López (3rd season)

==== In ====
Date	Player	From	Type	Fee	Ref
30 June 2019	(Spain) Ivi	Sporting Gijón	Loan return		
30 June 2019	(Spain) Iván López	Gimnàstic	Loan return		
30 June 2019	(Bosnia and Herzegovina) Sanjin Prcić	(France) Strasbourg	Loan return		
30 June 2019	(Albania) Armando Sadiku	(Switzerland) Lugano	Loan return		
30 June 2019	(Montenegro) Esteban Saveljich	Almería	Loan return		
1 July 2019	(Spain) Carlos Clerc	Osasuna	Transfer	Free	
1 July 2019	(Spain) Sergio León	Real Betis	Transfer	€4M	
1 July 2019	(Spain) Jorge Miramón	Huesca	Transfer	Free	
1 July 2019	(Portugal) Rúben Vezo	Valencia	Buyout clause	€5M	
2 July 2019	(Portugal) Hernâni	(Portugal) Porto	Transfer	Free	
3 July 2019	(Spain) Gonzalo Melero	Huesca	Transfer	€3.6M	
1 August 2019	(Costa Rica) Óscar Duarte	Espanyol	Transfer	Free	
21 August 2019	(Serbia) Nemanja Radoja	Celta Vigo	Transfer	Free	
2 September 2019	(Spain) Róber Pier	Deportivo La Coruña	Transfer	Undisclosed	

==== Out ====
Date	Player	To	Type	Fee	Ref
30 June 2019	(Spain) Róber Pier	Deportivo La Coruña	Loan return		
1 July 2019	(Spain) Jason	Valencia	Transfer	Free	
16 July 2019	(Spain) Pedro López	Huesca	Transfer	Free	
17 July 2019	(Ghana) Raphael Dwamena	Zaragoza	Loan		
17 July 2019	(Spain) Koke Vegas	Deportivo La Coruña	Loan		
27 July 2019	(Montenegro) Esteban Saveljich	Rayo Vallecano	Transfer	€300K	
8 August 2019	(Spain) Chema	(England) Nottingham Forest	Transfer	Undisclosed	
13 August 2019	(Spain) Ivi	Huesca	Loan		
15 August 2019	(Nigeria) Moses Simon	(France) Nantes	Loan		
29 August 2019	(Spain) Antonio Luna	Rayo Vallecano	Loan		
1 September 2019	(Spain) Fran Manzanara	Ponferradina	Loan		
2 September 2019	(Ivory Coast) Cheick Doukouré	Huesca	Loan		
2 September 2019	(Bosnia and Herzegovina) Sanjin Prcić	(France) Strasbourg	Transfer	Free	
2 September 2019	(Albania) Armando Sadiku	Málaga	Loan		

=== Mallorca ===
Manager: (Spain) Vicente Moreno (3rd season)

==== In ====
Date	Player	From	Type	Fee	Ref
30 June 2019	(Spain) Carlos Castro	Elche	Loan return		
30 June 2019	(France) Pierre Cornud	Linense	Loan return		
30 June 2019	(Spain) Moyita	Cartagena	Loan return		
30 June 2019	(Peru) Bryan Reyna	Alcoyano	Loan return		
30 June 2019	(Spain) Pol Roigé	Hércules	Loan return		
1 July 2019	(Croatia) Ante Budimir	(Italy) Crotone	Buyout clause	€2.2M	
1 July 2019	(Slovakia) Martin Valjent	(Italy) Chievo	Buyout clause	€1.5M	
2 July 2019	(Spain) Álex Alegría	Real Betis	Transfer	Free	
5 July 2019	(Argentina) Pablo Chavarría	(France) Reims	Transfer	Free	
10 July 2019	(Spain) Josep Señé	Cultural Leonesa	Transfer	Free	
12 July 2019	(Spain) Aleix Febas	Real Madrid Castilla	Transfer	Free	
12 July 2019	(Serbia) Aleksandar Sedlar	(Poland) Piast Gliwice	Transfer	Free	
31 July 2019	(Ghana) Lumor Agbenyenu	(Portugal) Sporting CP	Loan		
31 July 2019	(Serbia) Igor Zlatanović	(Serbia) Radnik Surdulica	Transfer	€1.3M	
7 August 2019	(North Macedonia) Aleksandar Trajkovski	(Italy) Palermo	Transfer	Free	
22 August 2019	(Japan) Takefusa Kubo	Real Madrid Castilla	Loan		
22 August 2019	(France) Yannis Salibur	(France) Guingamp	Transfer	€2M	
26 August 2019	(Colombia) Cucho Hernández	(England) Watford	Loan		
2 September 2019	(Spain) Fabri	(England) Fulham	Loan		
2 September 2019	(Ghana) Baba Rahman	(England) Chelsea	Loan		
2 September 2019	(Spain) Iñigo Ruiz de Galarreta	Las Palmas	Transfer	Undisclosed	

==== Out ====
Date	Player	To	Type	Fee	Ref
30 June 2019	(Ecuador) Pervis Estupiñán	(England) Watford	Loan return		
30 June 2019	(Spain) Salva Ruiz	Valencia	Loan return		
30 June 2019	(Serbia) Nikola Stojiljković	(Portugal) Braga	Loan return		
30 June 2019	(Argentina) Leonardo Suárez	Villarreal	Loan return		
6 July 2019	(Spain) Leandro Montagud	Cultural Leonesa	Transfer	Free	
12 July 2019	(Spain) Sergio Buenacasa	Ponferradina	Loan		
12 July 2019	(Argentina) Franco Russo	Ponferradina	Loan		
14 July 2019	(Spain) Álvaro Bustos	Pontevedra	Buyout clause	Undisclosed	
16 July 2019	(Spain) Pol Roigé	(Sweden) GIF Sundsvall	Transfer	Free	
17 July 2019	(Spain) Carlos Castro	Lugo	Loan		
19 July 2019	(Spain) Pablo Valcarce	Ponferradina	Loan		
20 July 2019	(Spain) Stoichkov	Alcorcón	Loan		
22 July 2019	(Argentina) Alejandro Faurlín	Marbella	Contract termination		
26 July 2019	(Spain) Fernando Cano	Lleida Esportiu	Contract termination		
30 July 2019	(Peru) Bryan Reyna	Barakaldo	Loan		
30 July 2019	(Spain) Álex López	Extremadura	Loan		
16 August 2019	(Serbia) Igor Zlatanović	Numancia	Loan		
30 August 2019	(Spain) Antonio Sánchez	Mirandés	Loan		
31 August 2019	(France) Pierre Cornud	Oviedo B	Loan		
2 September 2019	(Spain) Moyita	Rayo Majadahonda	Loan		
2 September 2019	(Spain) Iñigo Ruiz de Galarreta	Las Palmas	Loan		

=== Osasuna ===
Manager: (Spain) Jagoba Arrasate (2nd season)

==== In ====
Date	Player	From	Type	Fee	Ref
30 June 2019	(Spain) Miguel Díaz	Murcia	Loan return		
30 June 2019	(Spain) Imanol García	Gimnàstic	Loan return		
30 June 2019	(Spain) Antonio Otegui	Melilla	Loan return		
30 June 2019	(Spain) David Rodríguez	Numancia	Loan return		
1 July 2019	(Spain) Marc Cardona	Barcelona B	Transfer	€2.5M	
1 July 2019	(Spain) Brandon	(France) Rennes	Buyout clause	€2M	
1 July 2019	(Argentina) Chimy Ávila	(Argentina) San Lorenzo	Transfer	€2.7M	
3 July 2019	(Ecuador) Pervis Estupiñán	(England) Watford	Loan		
9 July 2019	(Spain) Jaume Grau	Real Madrid Castilla	Transfer	Free	
22 July 2019	(Serbia) Darko Brašanac	Real Betis	Transfer	Undisclosed	
30 July 2019	(Spain) Adrián López	(Portugal) Porto	Transfer	Free	
8 August 2019	(Argentina) Facundo Roncaglia	Celta Vigo	Transfer	€250K	
12 August 2019	(Spain) Robert Ibáñez	Getafe	Transfer	€2M	
14 August 2019	(Spain) Raúl Navas	Real Sociedad	Loan		

==== Out ====
Date	Player	To	Type	Fee	Ref
30 June 2019	(Spain) Robert Ibáñez	Getafe	Loan return		
1 July 2019	(Spain) Carlos Clerc	Levante	Transfer	Free	
7 July 2019	(Spain) Miguel Díaz	Tudelano	Transfer	Free	
9 July 2019	(Spain) Jaume Grau	Lugo	Loan		
19 July 2019	(Spain) Imanol García	Córdoba	Transfer	Free	
20 August 2019	(Spain) David Rodríguez	Racing Santander	Transfer	Free	
27 August 2019	(Spain) Antonio Otegui	Numancia	Loan		

=== Real Betis ===
Manager: (Spain) Rubi (1st season)

==== In ====
Date	Player	From	Type	Fee	Ref
30 June 2019	(Spain) Álex Alegría	Sporting Gijón	Loan return		
30 June 2019	(Algeria) Ryad Boudebouz	Celta Vigo	Loan return		
30 June 2019	(Serbia) Darko Brašanac	Alavés	Loan return		
30 June 2019	(Spain) Víctor Camarasa	(Wales) Cardiff City	Loan return		
30 June 2019	(Japan) Takashi Inui	Alavés	Loan return		
30 June 2019	(Colombia) Juanjo Narváez	Almería	Loan return		
30 June 2019	(Romania) Alin Toșca	(Greece) PAOK	Loan return		
1 July 2019	(Brazil) Emerson Royal	Barcelona	Transfer	€6M	
1 July 2019	(Spain) Juanmi	Real Sociedad	Transfer	€8M	
1 July 2019	(Argentina) Giovani Lo Celso	(France) Paris Saint-Germain	Buyout clause	€25M	
16 July 2019	(Spain) Alfonso Pedraza	Villarreal	Loan		
18 July 2019	(Spain) Dani Martín	Sporting Gijón	Transfer	€5M	
22 July 2019	(France) Nabil Fekir	(France) Lyon	Transfer	€20M	
22 July 2019	(France) Yassin Fekir	(France) Lyon II	Transfer	Undisclosed	
14 August 2019	(Spain) Borja Iglesias	Espanyol	Transfer	€28M	
14 August 2019	(Spain) Álex Moreno	Rayo Vallecano	Transfer	€7M	

==== Out ====
Date	Player	To	Type	Fee	Ref
30 June 2019	(Brazil) Emerson Royal	(Brazil) Atlético Mineiro	Loan return		
30 June 2019	(Spain) Jesé	(France) Paris Saint-Germain	Loan return		
1 July 2019	(Spain) Sergio León	Levante	Transfer	€4M	
2 July 2019	(Spain) Álex Alegría	Mallorca	Transfer	Free	
4 July 2019	(Spain) Aitor Ruibal	Leganés	Loan		
10 July 2019	(Spain) Pau López	(Italy) Roma	Transfer	€23.5M	
20 July 2019	(Romania) Alin Toșca	(Turkey) Gazişehir Gaziantep	Transfer	Free	
22 July 2019	(Serbia) Darko Brašanac	Osasuna	Transfer	Undisclosed	
24 July 2019	(Japan) Takashi Inui	Eibar	Transfer	€2M	
27 July 2019	(Algeria) Ryad Boudebouz	(France) Saint-Étienne	Transfer	€3.5M	
4 August 2019	(Spain) Junior Firpo	Barcelona	Transfer	€18M	
7 August 2019	(Spain) Víctor Camarasa	(England) Crystal Palace	Loan		
8 August 2019	(Argentina) Giovani Lo Celso	(England) Tottenham Hotspur	Loan	€18M	
31 August 2019	(Colombia) Juanjo Narváez	Las Palmas	Loan		

=== Real Madrid ===
Manager: (France) Zinedine Zidane (2nd season)

==== In ====
Date	Player	From	Type	Fee	Ref
30 June 2019	(Spain) Raúl de Tomás	Rayo Vallecano	Loan return		
30 June 2019	(France) Théo Hernandez	Real Sociedad	Loan return		
30 June 2019	(Ukraine) Andriy Lunin	Leganés	Loan return		
30 June 2019	(Norway) Martin Ødegaard	(Netherlands) Vitesse	Loan return		
30 June 2019	(Colombia) James Rodríguez	(Germany) Bayern Munich	Loan return		
30 June 2019	(Brazil) Lucas Silva	(Brazil) Cruzeiro	Loan return		
1 July 2019	(Belgium) Eden Hazard	(England) Chelsea	Transfer	€100M	
1 July 2019	(Serbia) Luka Jović	(Germany) Eintracht Frankfurt	Transfer	€60M	
1 July 2019	(France) Ferland Mendy	(France) Lyon	Transfer	€48M	
1 July 2019	(Brazil) Éder Militão	(Portugal) Porto	Transfer	€50M	
1 July 2019	(Brazil) Rodrygo	(Brazil) Santos	Transfer	€45M	
2 September 2019	(France) Alphonse Areola	(France) Paris Saint-Germain	Loan		

==== Out ====
Date	Player	To	Type	Fee	Ref
1 July 2019	(Croatia) Mateo Kovačić	(England) Chelsea	Buyout clause	€45M	
1 July 2019	(Spain) Marcos Llorente	Atlético Madrid	Transfer	€40M	
3 July 2019	(Spain) Raúl de Tomás	(Portugal) Benfica	Transfer	€20M	
5 July 2019	(Norway) Martin Ødegaard	Real Sociedad	Loan		
5 July 2019	(Spain) Sergio Reguilón	Sevilla	Loan		
7 July 2019	(France) Théo Hernandez	(Italy) Milan	Transfer	€20M	
8 July 2019	(France) Luca Zidane	Racing Santander	Loan		
25 July 2019	(Spain) Dani Ceballos	(England) Arsenal	Loan		
25 July 2019	(Spain) Jesús Vallejo	(England) Wolverhampton Wanderers	Loan		
13 August 2019	(Ukraine) Andriy Lunin	Valladolid	Loan		
2 September 2019	(Costa Rica) Keylor Navas	(France) Paris Saint-Germain	Transfer	€15M	
2 September 2019	(Brazil) Lucas Silva	Unattached	Released		

=== Real Sociedad ===
Manager: (Spain) Imanol Alguacil (2nd season)

==== In ====
Date	Player	From	Type	Fee	Ref
30 June 2019	(France) Modibo Sagnan	(France) Lens	Loan return		
1 July 2019	(Sweden) Alexander Isak	(Germany) Borussia Dortmund	Transfer	€8M	
1 July 2019	(Spain) Álex Remiro	Athletic Bilbao	Transfer	Free	
1 July 2019	(Spain) Portu	Girona	Transfer	€10M	
5 July 2019	(Norway) Martin Ødegaard	Real Madrid	Loan		
31 August 2019	(Spain) Nacho Monreal	(England) Arsenal	Transfer	€250K	

==== Out ====
Date	Player	To	Type	Fee	Ref
30 June 2019	(France) Théo Hernandez	Real Madrid	Loan return		
30 June 2019	(Spain) Sandro Ramírez	(England) Everton	Loan return		
1 July 2019	(Spain) Juanmi	Real Betis	Transfer	€8M	
11 July 2019	(Spain) Jon Bautista	(Belgium) Eupen	Loan		
12 July 2019	(Spain) Eneko Capilla	(Cyprus) Asteras Tripolis	Transfer	Undisclosed	
19 July 2019	(Spain) Martín Merquelanz	Albacete	Loan		
29 July 2019	(Mexico) Héctor Moreno	(Qatar) Al-Gharafa	Transfer	Undisclosed	
14 August 2019	(Spain) Raúl Navas	Osasuna	Loan		
14 August 2019	(Argentina) Gerónimo Rulli	(France) Montpellier	Loan	€1.5M	
2 September 2019	(Portugal) Kévin Rodrigues	Leganés	Loan		

=== Sevilla ===
Manager: (Spain) Julen Lopetegui (1st season)

==== In ====
Date	Player	From	Type	Fee	Ref
30 June 2019	(France) Sébastien Corchia	(Portugal) Benfica	Loan return		
30 June 2019	(Colombia) Luis Muriel	(Italy) Fiorentina	Loan return		
30 June 2019	(Spain) Sergio Rico	(England) Fulham	Loan return		
1 July 2019	(Brazil) Diego Carlos	(France) Nantes	Transfer	€15M	
1 July 2019	(Israel) Mu'nas Dabbur	(Austria) Red Bull Salzburg	Transfer	€15M	
1 July 2019	(Netherlands) Luuk de Jong	(Netherlands) PSV	Transfer	€12.5M	
1 July 2019	(Spain) Joan Jordán	Eibar	Transfer	€14M	
1 July 2019	(Austria) Maximilian Wöber	(Netherlands) Ajax	Buyout clause	€10.5M	
3 July 2019	(France) Jules Koundé	(France) Bordeaux	Transfer	€25M	
3 July 2019	(Argentina) Lucas Ocampos	(France) Marseille	Transfer	€15M	
5 July 2019	(Spain) Sergio Reguilón	Real Madrid	Loan		
12 July 2019	(Brazil) Fernando	(Turkey) Galatasaray	Transfer	€4.5M	
15 July 2019	(Spain) Óliver Torres	(Portugal) Porto	Transfer	€12M	
17 July 2019	(Cameroon) Yan Brice Eteki	Almería	Transfer	€500K	
23 July 2019	(Serbia) Nemanja Gudelj	(China) Guangzhou Evergrande	Transfer	Free	
14 August 2019	(Portugal) Rony Lopes	(France) Monaco	Transfer	€25M	
2 September 2019	(Morocco) Bono	Girona	Loan		
2 September 2019	(Mexico) Javier Hernández	(England) West Ham United	Transfer	€7.8M	

==== Out ====
Date	Player	To	Type	Fee	Ref
30 June 2019	(France) Maxime Gonalons	(Italy) Roma	Loan return		
30 June 2019	(Croatia) Marko Rog	(Italy) Napoli	Loan return		
30 June 2019	(Portugal) André Silva	(Italy) Milan	Loan return		
1 July 2019	(Argentina) Gabriel Mercado	(Qatar) Al-Rayyan	Transfer	Free	
1 July 2019	(Colombia) Luis Muriel	(Italy) Atalanta	Transfer	€15M	
1 July 2019	(Netherlands) Quincy Promes	(Netherlands) Ajax	Transfer	€15.7M	
2 July 2019	(Spain) Pablo Sarabia	(France) Paris Saint-Germain	Transfer	€18M	
5 July 2019	(Spain) Juan Soriano	Leganés	Loan		
18 July 2019	(Cameroon) Yan Brice Eteki	Granada	Transfer	€1M	
28 July 2019	(Spain) Aleix Vidal	Alavés	Loan		
7 August 2019	(France) Ibrahim Amadou	(England) Norwich City	Loan		
13 August 2019	(Spain) Roque Mesa	Leganés	Loan		
13 August 2019	(Austria) Maximilian Wöber	(Austria) Red Bull Salzburg	Transfer	€12M	
14 August 2019	(France) Wissam Ben Yedder	(France) Monaco	Transfer	€40M	
14 August 2019	(Spain) Carlos Fernández	Granada	Loan		
21 August 2019	(France) Sébastien Corchia	Espanyol	Loan		
26 August 2019	(France) Joris Gnagnon	(France) Rennes	Loan		
28 August 2019	(Brazil) Guilherme Arana	(Italy) Atalanta	Loan	€1M	
1 September 2019	(Spain) Sergio Rico	(France) Paris Saint-Germain	Loan		
2 September 2019	(Denmark) Simon Kjær	(Italy) Atalanta	Loan		

=== Valencia ===
Manager: (Spain) Marcelino (3rd season)

==== In ====
Date	Player	From	Type	Fee	Ref
30 June 2019	(Tunisia) Aymen Abdennour	(France) Marseille	Loan return		
30 June 2019	(Spain) Nacho Gil	Elche	Loan return		
30 June 2019	(Spain) Álvaro Medrán	Rayo Vallecano	Loan return		
30 June 2019	(Colombia) Jeison Murillo	Barcelona	Loan return		
30 June 2019	(Spain) Salva Ruiz	Mallorca	Loan return		
30 June 2019	(Spain) Manu Vallejo	Cádiz	Loan return		
1 July 2019	(Russia) Denis Cheryshev	Villarreal	Buyout clause	€6M	
1 July 2019	(Netherlands) Jasper Cillessen	Barcelona	Transfer	€35M	
1 July 2019	(Spain) Jason	Levante	Transfer	Free	
1 July 2019	(Spain) Jorge Sáenz	Tenerife	Transfer	€2M	
14 July 2019	(Uruguay) Maxi Gómez	Celta Vigo	Trade	€14.5M + Santi Mina + Jorge Sáenz	
12 August 2019	(France) Eliaquim Mangala	(England) Manchester City	Transfer	Free	
13 August 2019	(Spain) Jaume Costa	Villarreal	Loan		
2 September 2019	(Portugal) Thierry Correia	(Portugal) Sporting CP	Transfer	€12M	

==== Out ====
Date	Player	To	Type	Fee	Ref
30 June 2019	(Argentina) Facundo Roncaglia	Celta Vigo	Loan return		
30 June 2019	(Italy) Simone Zaza	(Italy) Torino	Buyout clause	€12M	
1 July 2019	(Brazil) Neto	Barcelona	Transfer	€26M	
1 July 2019	(Portugal) Rúben Vezo	Levante	Buyout clause	€5M	
5 July 2019	(Spain) Toni Lato	(Netherlands) PSV	Loan		
9 July 2019	(Spain) Álex Blanco	Zaragoza	Loan		
11 July 2019	(Tunisia) Aymen Abdennour	(Turkey) Kayserispor	Transfer	Free	
13 July 2019	(Colombia) Jeison Murillo	(Italy) Sampdoria	Loan	€2M	
14 July 2019	(Spain) Santi Mina	Celta Vigo	Trade	Maxi Gómez	
14 July 2019	(Spain) Jorge Sáenz	Celta Vigo	Trade	Maxi Gómez	
19 July 2019	(Spain) Nacho Gil	Ponferradina	Transfer	Free	
2 September 2019	(Spain) Jason	Getafe	Loan		
2 September 2019	(Spain) Salva Ruiz	Deportivo La Coruña	Transfer	Free	
3 September 2019	(Spain) Álvaro Medrán	Unattached	Released		

=== Valladolid ===
Manager: (Spain) Sergio González (3rd season)

==== In ====
Date	Player	From	Type	Fee	Ref
30 June 2019	(Spain) Álvaro Aguado	Córdoba	Loan return		
30 June 2019	(Spain) Churripi	Albacete	Loan return		
30 June 2019	(Spain) Antonio Domínguez	Sabadell	Loan return		
30 June 2019	(Spain) David Mayoral	Alcorcón	Loan return		
30 June 2019	(Spain) Chris Ramos	Sevilla Atlético	Loan return		
30 June 2019	(Spain) Fede San Emeterio	Granada	Loan return		
1 July 2019	(Spain) Jorge de Frutos	Real Madrid Castilla	Loan		
1 July 2019	(Spain) Pablo Hervías	Eibar	Buyout clause	€1M	
2 July 2019	(Spain) Sandro Ramírez	(England) Everton	Loan		
6 July 2019	(Italy) Federico Barba	(Italy) Chievo	Loan		
12 August 2019	(Spain) Pedro Porro	(England) Manchester City	Loan		
13 August 2019	(Ukraine) Andriy Lunin	Real Madrid	Loan		

==== Out ====
Date	Player	To	Type	Fee	Ref
30 June 2019	(Croatia) Duje Čop	(Belgium) Standard Liège	Loan return		
30 June 2019	(Spain) Borja Fernández	Retired			
30 June 2019	(Spain) Keko	Málaga	Loan return		
30 June 2019	(Italy) Daniele Verde	(Italy) Roma	Loan return		
30 June 2019	(Spain) Yoel	Eibar	Loan return		
11 July 2019	(Spain) Moi	Racing Santander	Loan		
25 July 2019	(Spain) Antonio Domínguez	Algeciras	Transfer	Free	
9 August 2019	(Spain) Fernando Calero	Espanyol	Transfer	€8M	
16 August 2019	(Spain) Churripi	Ponferradina	Loan		
17 August 2019	(Spain) David Mayoral	UCAM Murcia	Transfer	Free	
2 September 2019	(Spain) Chris Ramos	Badajoz	Loan return		

=== Villarreal ===
Manager: (Spain) Javier Calleja (2nd season)

==== In ====
Date	Player	From	Type	Fee	Ref
30 June 2019	(Qatar) Akram Afif	(Qatar) Al Sadd	Loan return		
30 June 2019	(Uruguay) Ramiro Guerra	Gimnàstic	Loan return		
30 June 2019	(Senegal) Alfred N'Diaye	Málaga	Loan return		
30 June 2019	(Portugal) Rúben Semedo	(Portugal) Rio Ave	Loan return		
30 June 2019	(Argentina) Leonardo Suárez	Mallorca	Loan return		
4 July 2019	(Spain) Raúl Albiol	(Italy) Napoli	Transfer	€5M	
4 July 2019	(Spain) Rubén Peña	Eibar	Transfer	€8M	
9 July 2019	(Spain) Alberto Moreno	(England) Liverpool	Transfer	Free	
18 July 2019	(Spain) Moi Gómez	Sporting Gijón	Transfer	Undisclosed	
26 July 2019	(Cameroon) André-Frank Zambo Anguissa	(England) Fulham	Loan		
20 August 2019	(Spain) Javier Ontiveros	Málaga	Transfer	€7.5M	

==== Out ====
Date	Player	To	Type	Fee	Ref
1 July 2019	(Qatar) Akram Afif	(Qatar) Al Sadd	Loan		
1 July 2019	(Russia) Denis Cheryshev	Valencia	Buyout clause	€6M	
1 July 2019	(Spain) Pablo Fornals	(England) West Ham United	Transfer	€28M	
1 July 2019	(Spain) Javi Fuego	Sporting Gijón	Transfer	Free	
1 July 2019	(Italy) Nicola Sansone	(Italy) Bologna	Buyout clause	€7.5M	
1 July 2019	(Portugal) Rúben Semedo	(Greece) Olympiacos	Transfer	€4.5M	
1 July 2019	(Italy) Roberto Soriano	(Italy) Bologna	Buyout clause	€7.5M	
11 July 2019	(Spain) Miguelón	Huesca	Loan		
16 July 2019	(Spain) Alfonso Pedraza	Real Betis	Loan		
19 July 2019	(Spain) Álvaro	(France) Marseille	Loan		
5 August 2019	(Spain) Dani Raba	Huesca	Loan		
7 August 2019	(Spain) Víctor Ruiz	(Turkey) Beşiktaş	Transfer	€2.5M	
13 August 2019	(Spain) Jaume Costa	Valencia	Loan		
30 August 2019	(Senegal) Alfred N'Diaye	(Saudi Arabia) Al-Shabab	Transfer	€6M	
