= List of Spanish football transfers winter 2015–16 =

This is a list of Spanish football transfers for the winter sale in the 2015–16 season of La Liga and Segunda División. Only moves from La Liga and Segunda División are listed.

The winter transfer window will open on 4 January 2016, although a few transfers took place prior to that date. The window closed at midnight on 31 January 2016. Players without a club can join one at any time, either during or in between transfer windows. Clubs below La Liga level can also sign players on loan at any time. If need be, clubs can sign a goalkeeper on an emergency loan, if all others are unavailable.

== Winter 2015-16 transfer window ==
| Date | Name | Moving from | Moving to | Fee |
|---|---|---|---|---|
| 10 November 2015 | (Colombia) Mauricio Cuero | (Colombia) La Equidad | (Spain) Levante | €3.2M |
| 18 November 2015 | (Spain) Eder Vilarchao | (Spain) Betis | Retired | Free |
| 19 November 2015 | (Spain) Yoel | (Spain) Valencia | (Spain) Rayo Vallecano | Loan |
| 26 November 2015 | (Spain) Cristian Lobato | Unattached | (Spain) Gimnàstic Tarragona | Free |
| 6 December 2015 | (Spain) Iñaki Sáenz | (Spain) Racing de Santander | (Spain) Deportivo Alavés | Free |
| 9 December 2015 | (Spain) José Carlos Fernández | Unattached | (Spain) Llagostera | Free |
| 15 December 2015 | (Spain) David Generelo | (Spain) Real Oviedo | Retired | Free |
| 20 December 2015 | (Croatia) Stipe Pletikosa | Unattached | (Spain) Deportivo La Coruña | Free |
| 21 December 2015 | (Spain) Marcos Tébar | (England) Brentford | (Spain) Llagostera | Free |
| 24 December 2015 | (Spain) Javi Noblejas | (Spain) Getafe | (Spain) Elche | Free |
| 24 December 2015 | (Spain) Saúl García | (Spain) Deportivo La Coruña | (Spain) Tenerife | Loan |
| 28 December 2015 | (Spain) Sergi Guardiola | (Spain) Alcorcón | (Spain) Barcelona B | Free |
| 29 December 2015 | (Spain) Josan | (Spain) Alcorcón | (Spain) UCAM Murcia | Loan |
| 30 December 2015 | (Spain) Jon García | (Spain) Lugo | (Spain) Racing Santander | Free |
| 30 December 2015 | (Argentina) Matías Kranevitter | (Argentina) River Plate | (Spain) Atlético Madrid | Loan return |
| 30 December 2015 | (Serbia) Dejan Lekić | (India) Atlético Kolkata | (Spain) Girona | Free |
| 31 December 2015 | (Argentina) Augusto Fernández | (Spain) Celta Vigo | (Spain) Atlético Madrid | €6.5M |
| 31 December 2015 | (Spain) Jon Agirrezabala | (Spain) Bilbao Athletic | (Spain) Sestao River | Loan |
| 1 January 2016 | (Spain) Bicho | (Spain) Leganés | (Spain) Deportivo La Coruña | Loan return |
| 1 January 2016 | (Spain) Bicho | (Spain) Deportivo La Coruña | (Spain) Compostela | Loan |
| 3 January 2016 | (Mali) Ousseynou Cissé | (Spain) Rayo Vallecano | (Belgium) Waasland-Beveren | Loan |
| 4 January 2016 | (Spain) Enric Pi | (Spain) Llagostera | Unattached | Free |
| 4 January 2016 | (Brazil) Mosquito | (Spain) Llagostera | (Brazil) Vasco da Gama | Loan return |
| 5 January 2016 | (Spain) Ángel Lafita | (Spain) Getafe | (United Arab Emirates) Al-Jazira | Undisclosed |
| 6 January 2016 | (Uruguay) Chory Castro | (Spain) Real Sociedad | (Spain) Málaga | Free |
| 7 January 2016 | (Nigeria) Kalu Uche | (India) Pune City | (Spain) Almería | Free |
| 7 January 2016 | (Spain) Fali | (Spain) Gimnàstic Tarragona | (Spain) Barcelona B | Loan |
| 7 January 2016 | (Cameroon) Fabrice Ondoa | (Spain) Barcelona B | (Spain) Gimnàstic Tarragona | Free |
| 8 January 2016 | (Montenegro) Bogdan Milić | (Spain) Osasuna | Unattached | Free |
| 8 January 2016 | (Slovenia) Bojan Jokić | (Spain) Villarreal | (England) Nottingham Forest | Loan |
| 8 January 2016 | (Spain) Albert Vivancos | (Spain) Girona | (Spain) Hércules | Loan |
| 8 January 2016 | (Uruguay) Ernesto Goñi | (Argentina) Tigre | (Spain) Almería | Free |
| 8 January 2016 | (Spain) Juan Muñiz | (Spain) Sporting Gijón | (Spain) Gimnàstic Tarragona | Free |
| 8 January 2016 | (Georgia (country)) Giorgi Aburjania | (Cyprus) Anorthosis Famagusta | (Spain) Gimnàstic Tarragona | Free |
| 9 January 2016 | (Spain) Dani Benítez | Unattached | (Spain) Alcorcón | Free |
| 10 January 2016 | (Argentina) Luis Fariña | (Spain) Rayo Vallecano | (Portugal) Benfica | Loan return |
| 11 January 2016 | (Spain) Urko Vera | (South Korea) Jeonbuk Hyundai Motors | (Spain) Osasuna | Free |
| 11 January 2016 | (Spain) Manolín | (Spain) Huesca | (Spain) Osasuna | Free |
| 11 January 2016 | (Spain) Adrián Colunga | Unattached | (Spain) Mallorca | Free |
| 11 January 2016 | (Spain) Pol Roigé | (Spain) Sabadell | (Spain) Mallorca | Free |
| 12 January 2016 | (Argentina) Gonzalo Escalante | (Spain) Eibar | (Italy) Catania | Loan return |
| 12 January 2016 | (Argentina) Gonzalo Escalante | (Italy) Catania | (Spain) Eibar | Undisclosed |
| 12 January 2016 | (Argentina) Franco Cristaldo | (Argentina) Boca Juniors | (Spain) Elche | Loan |
| 12 January 2015 | (Spain) Juan Pablo Colinas | (Israel) Maccabi Tel Aviv | (Spain) Numancia | Free |
| 13 January 2016 | (Spain) Xisco Hernández | (Spain) Gimnàstic | (Spain) Atlético Baleares | Loan |
| 13 January 2016 | (Italy) Ciro Immobile | (Spain) Sevilla | (Germany) Borussia Dortmund | Loan return |
| 13 January 2016 | (Spain) Pablo Maffeo | (England) Manchester City | (Spain) Girona | Loan |
| 14 January 2016 | (Uruguay) Nico López | (Spain) Granada | (Italy) Udinese | Loan return |
| 14 January 2016 | (Spain) Edu Oriol | Unattached | (Spain) Llagostera | Free |
| 14 January 2016 | (Portugal) Fábio Espinho | (Spain) Málaga | (Portugal) Moreirense | Loan |
| 15 January 2016 | (Spain) Kike Sola | (Spain) Athletic Bilbao | (England) Middlesbrough | Loan |
| 15 January 2016 | (France) Vincenzo Rennella | (Spain) Betis | (Spain) Valladolid | Loan+Buy |
| 15 January 2016 | (Spain) Juanto | (Spain) Llagostera | (Portugal) Os Belenenses | Free |
| 15 January 2016 | (Spain) Javier Matilla | (Spain) Betis | Unattached | Free |
| 15 January 2016 | (Chile) Marcelo Díaz | (Germany) Hamburger SV | (Spain) Celta Vigo | €1.5M |
| 15 January 2016 | (Italy) Edoardo Oneto | (Italy) Sampdoria | (Spain) Real Oviedo | Loan |
| 15 January 2016 | (Mexico) Aníbal Zurdo | (Mexico) Cruz Azul | (Spain) Gimnàstic | Free |
| 16 January 2016 | (Spain) Jota | (England) Brentford | (Spain) Eibar | Loan |
| 17 January 2016 | (Guadeloupe) Claudio Beauvue | (France) Lyon | (Spain) Celta Vigo | Undisclosed |
| 18 January 2016 | (Morocco) Nordin Amrabat | (Spain) Málaga | (England) Watford | Undisclosed |
| 18 January 2016 | (Spain) Moussa Bandeh | (Spain) Gimnàstic | (Spain) Olot | Loan |
| 19 January 2016 | (Gabon) Lévy Madinda | (Spain) Celta Vigo | (Spain) Gimnàstic | Loan |
| 19 January 2016 | (Brazil) Samir Santos | (Spain) Granada | (Italy) Verona | Loan |
| 20 January 2016 | (Italy) Rolando Bianchi | (Spain) Mallorca | (Italy) Perugia | Undisclosed |
| 20 January 2016 | (Spain) José Ángel Crespo | (England) Aston Villa | (Spain) Rayo Vallecano | Loan |
| 22 January 2016 | (Italy) Alessio Cerci | (Spain) Atlético Madrid | (Italy) Genoa | Loan |
| 22 January 2016 | (Chile) Igor Lichnovsky | (Portugal) Porto | (Spain) Sporting Gijón | Loan |
| 22 January 2016 | (Italy) Giuseppe Rossi | (Italy) Fiorentina | (Spain) Levante | Loan |
| 22 January 2016 | (Spain) Cristian Tello | (Spain) Barcelona | (Italy) Fiorentina | Loan |
| 25 January 2016 | (Spain) Mikel Arruabarrena | (Spain) Eibar | (Spain) Huesca | Loan |
| 26 January 2016 | (Ghana) Christian Atsu | (England) Chelsea | (Spain) Málaga | Loan |
| 26 January 2016 | (Costa Rica) Óscar Duarte | (Belgium) Club Brugge | (Spain) Espanyol | Undisclosed |
| 26 January 2016 | (Argentina) Juan Ramírez | (United States) Colorado Rapids | (Spain) Almería | Loan |
| 27 January 2016 | (Spain) Agus | (Spain) Albacete | (United States) Houston Dynamo | Free |
| 27 January 2016 | (Spain) Tomeu Nadal | (Spain) Gimnàstic | Unattached | Free |
| 27 January 2016 | (Spain) David Rocha | (Spain) Gimnàstic | (United States) Houston Dynamo | Free |
| 28 January 2016 | (Lithuania) Giedrius Arlauskis | (England) Watford | (Spain) Espanyol | Loan |
| 28 January 2016 | (Uruguay) Mauricio Lemos | (Russia) Rubin Kazan | (Spain) Las Palmas | Loan |
| 29 January 2016 | (Belgium) Charly Musonda | (England) Chelsea | (Spain) Real Betis | Loan + Buy |
| 30 January 2016 | (Portugal) Diogo Figueiras | (Italy) Genoa | (Spain) Sevilla | Loan return |
| 31 January 2016 | (Argentina) Federico Fazio | (England) Tottenham Hotspur | (Spain) Sevilla | Loan |
| 31 January 2016 | (Chile) Manuel Iturra | (Italy) Udinese | (Spain) Rayo Vallecano | Loan |
| 31 January 2016 | (Brazil) Guilherme Siqueira | (Spain) Atlético Madrid | (Spain) Valencia | Loan |
| 1 February 2016 | (Spain) Ansotegi | (Spain) Real Sociedad | (Spain) Eibar | |
| 1 February 2016 | (Israel) Gal Arel | (Spain) Gimnàstic | Unattached | Free |
| 1 February 2016 | (Spain) Miguel de las Cuevas | (Italy) Sepzia | (Spain) Osasuna | Free |
| 1 February 2016 | (France) Abdoulaye Doucouré | (England) Watford | (Spain) Granada | Loan |
| 1 February 2016 | (Iceland) Alfreð Finnbogason | (Spain) Real Sociedad | (Germany) FC Augsburg | Loan |
| 1 February 2016 | (Spain) Martín Montoya | (Italy) Inter Milan | (Spain) Barcelona | Loan return |
| 1 February 2016 | (Spain) Martín Montoya | (Spain) Barcelona | (Spain) Real Betis | Loan |
| 1 February 2016 | (Venezuela) Adalberto Peñaranda | (England) Watford | (Spain) Granada | Loan |
| 1 February 2016 | (Spain) Joan Verdú | (Italy) Fiorentina | (Spain) Levante | Free |
| 3 February 2016 | (Spain) Kike | (England) Middlesbrough | (Spain) Eibar | Undisclosed |
| 3 February 2016 | (Colombia) Jackson Martínez | (Spain) Atlético Madrid | (China) Guangzhou Evergrande Taobao | €42m |
| 3 February 2016 | (Egypt) Amro Tarek | (Spain) Real Betis | (United States) Columbus Crew | Loan |
| 4 February 2016 | (Brazil) Leandro Damião | Unattached | (Spain) Real Betis | Free |
| 5 February 2016 | (France) Gaël Kakuta | (Spain) Sevilla | Hebei China Fortune | Undisclosed |
