= 2016–17 RCD Mallorca season =

RCD Mallorca
2016–17 season
- Owner: Robert Sarver
- President: Monti Galmés
- Head coach: Fernando Vázquez (until 6 December 2016); Javier Olaizola (until 4 April 2017); Sergi Barjuán
- Stadium: Son Moix
- Segunda División: 20th (Relegated)
- Copa del Rey: Third round
- Top goalscorer: League: Brandon Thomas (12 goals); All: Brandon Thomas (13 goals)
Home colours	Away colours	Third colours

The 2016–17 season was Real Club Deportivo Mallorca's 82nd season in existence and the club's 4th season back in the second division of Spanish football. In addition to the domestic league, RCD Mallorca participated in this season's edition of the Copa del Rey. The season covers the period from 1 July 2016 to 30 June 2017.

== Competitions ==
=== Overview ===
Competition	First match	Last match	Starting round	Final position	Record							
Competition	First match	Last match	Starting round	Final position	Pld	W	D	L	GF	GA	GD	Win %
Segunda División	20 August 2016	10 June 2017	Matchday 1	20th	42	9	18	15	42	50	−8	21.43
Copa del Rey	7 September 2016	12 October 2016	Second round	Third round	2	1	0	1	2	2	+0	50.00
Total					44	10	18	16	44	52	−8	22.73

Last updated: 10 June 2017
Source: Competitions

=== Segunda División ===
==== League table ====
Pos	Team	Pld	W	D	L	GF	GA	GD	Pts	Promotion, qualification or relegation
18	Alcorcón	42	13	11	18	32	43	−11	50 (Note: Zaragoza and Numancia finished ahead of Alcorcón on head-to-head points: Zaragoza 7 pts, Numancia 7 pts, Alcorcón 2 pts. Zaragoza finished ahead of Numancia on head-to-head goal difference: Numancia 2–1 Zaragoza, Zaragoza 3–0 Numancia)	
19	UCAM Murcia (R)	42	11	15	16	42	51	−9	48	Relegation to Segunda División B
20	Mallorca (R)	42	9	18	15	42	50	−8	45	Relegation to Segunda División B
21	Elche (R)	42	11	10	21	49	63	−14	43	Relegation to Segunda División B
22	Mirandés (R)	42	9	14	19	40	66	−26	41	Relegation to Segunda División B

Source: La Liga
Rules for classification: 1) points; 2) head-to-head points; 3) head-to-head goal difference; 4) goal difference; 5) number of goals scored
(R) Relegated

==== Results summary ====
Overall								Home						Away					
Pld	W	D	L	GF	GA	GD	Pts	W	D	L	GF	GA	GD	W	D	L	GF	GA	GD
42	9	18	15	42	50	−8	45	7	11	3	22	19	+3	2	7	12	20	31	−11

Last updated: 10 June 2017.

==== Results by round ====
Matchday	1	2	3	4	5	6	7	8	9	10	11	12	13	14	15	16	17	18	19	20	21	22	23	24	25	26	27	28	29	30	31	32	33	34	35	36	37	38	39	40	41	42
Ground	H	A	H	A	H	A	H	A	H	A	H	A	H	A	H	A	H	A	A	H	A	A	H	A	H	A	H	A	H	A	H	A	H	A	H	A	H	A	H	H	A	H
Result	L	D	D	L	W	D	D	L	W	L	W	D	D	W	D	L	L	L	L	W	D	D	D	L	W	L	L	D	D	L	D	L	D	L	D	W	W	L	W	D	D	D
Position	16	16	16	16	14	14	14	16	16	16	14	14	14	14	14	16	18	18	18	18	18	18	18	19	17	20	20	20	20	20	21	21	21	21	21	21	21	21	20	20	20	20

A = Away; H = Home; W = Win; D = Draw; L = Loss

==== Matches ====
20 August 2016 1	Mallorca	0–1	Reus	Palma
19:00	Antonio Raillo (yellow card) 26'; Thierry Moutinho (yellow card) 45+1' (yellow-red card); Culio (yellow card) 52'	Report	Migue García (yellow card) 17' (yellow-red card); Aritz López Garai (yellow card) 41'; Melli (yellow card) 68'; Ramón Folch (yellow card) 86'; Alberto Benito 90'	Stadium: Iberostar Stadium; Attendance: 8,437; Referee: (Spain) Saúl Ais

28 August 2016 2	Cádiz	1- 1	Mallorca	Cádiz
22:30	Ortuño 29' (pen.); Aridane Hernández (yellow card) 45+1'	Report	Óscar Díaz 66'; Biel Company (yellow card) 71' (yellow-red card); Brandon (yellow card) 83'; Eduard Campabadal (yellow card) 90+2'	Stadium: Estadio Ramón de Carranza; Attendance: 16,471; Referee: (Spain) Valentín Pizarro

4 September 2016 3	Mallorca	0–0	Real Oviedo	Palma
20:00	Antonio Raillo (yellow card) 56'; Damià Sabater (yellow card) 86'	Report	Jon Erice (yellow card) 39'; Lucas Torró (yellow card) 65'; Óscar Gil (yellow card) 90+2'	Stadium: Iberostar Stadium; Attendance: 9,471; Referee: (Spain) Eduardo Prieto

11 September 2016 4	Rayo Vallecano	1–0	Mallorca	Madrid
12:00	Antonio Amaya (yellow card) 38'; Álex Moreno 70'	Report	Eduard Campabadal (yellow card) 85'	Stadium: Campo de Fútbol de Vallecas; Attendance: 8,067; Referee: (Spain) Jorge Figueroa

18 September 2016 5	Mallorca	1–0	Girona	Palma
20:00	Longo 21' (o.g.); Culio (yellow card) 32'; Antonio Raillo (yellow card) 51'; Eduard Campabadal (yellow card) 77'; Lago (yellow card) 85'	Report	Eloi Amagat (yellow card) 43'; Longo (yellow card) 55'; Pere Pons (yellow card) 90+3'	Stadium: Iberostar Stadium; Attendance: 8,696; Referee: (Spain) Pedro Pérez

22 September 2016 6	Tenerife	0–0	Mallorca	Santa Cruz de Tenerife
22:00	Marc Crosas (yellow card) 61'; Aitor Sanz (yellow card) 63'; Aarón Ñíguez (yellow card) 79'	Report	Eduard Campabadal (yellow card) 68'	Stadium: Estadio Heliodoro Rodríguez López; Attendance: 8,019; Referee: (Spain) Aitor Gorostegui

25 September 2016 7	Mallorca	0–0	UCAM Murcia	Palma
18:00		Report	Juande (yellow card) 33'; Tito (yellow card) 43'	Stadium: Iberostar Stadium; Attendance: 9,081; Referee: (Spain) Javier Alberola

1 October 2016 8	Lugo	3–1	Mallorca	Lugo
18:00	Carlos Pita 14'; Joselu 28' 75' (yellow card) 81'; Ignasi Miquel (yellow card) 53'	Report	Brandon 6'	Stadium: Estadio Anxo Carro; Referee: (Spain) Víctor Areces

9 October 2016 9	Mallorca	3–0	Huesca	Palma
18:00	Brandon 4' 6' 71'; Culio (yellow card) 41'; Ansotegi (yellow card) 45'; Óscar Díaz (yellow card) 56'; Joan Oriol (yellow card) 58' (yellow-red card)	Report	Carlos Akapo (yellow card) 10'	Stadium: Iberostar Stadium; Attendance: 8,586; Referee: (Spain) Francisco Arias

15 October 2016 10	Levante	2–1	Mallorca	Valencia
20:00	Chema 18'; Abraham (yellow card) 19'; Lerma (yellow card) 54' (goal) 61'; Natxo Insa (yellow card) 89'	Report	Ansotegi 13'; Brandon (yellow card) 30'; Juan Domínguez (yellow card) 39'; Culio (yellow card) 84'; Héctor Yuste (yellow card) 85'	Stadium: Estadi Ciutat de València; Attendance: 11,804; Referee: (Spain) Dámaso Arcediano

23 October 2016 11	Mallorca	1–0	Alcorcón	Palma
12:00	Culio (yellow card) 33'; Juan Domínguez (yellow card) 70'; Héctor Yuste (yellow card) 71'; Joan Oriol (yellow card) 73'; Lago 76' (pen.) (yellow card) 79'	Report	Iván González (yellow card) 7'; Manuel Sanchez (yellow card) 42' (yellow-red card); Iván Alejo (yellow card) 71'; David Navarro (yellow card) 75'	Stadium: Iberostar Stadium; Attendance: 7,884; Referee: (Spain) Pablo González

30 October 2016 12	Gimnàstic de Tarragona	2- 2	Mallorca	Tarragona
18:00	Juan Muñiz 22' (yellow card) 37'; Tejera (yellow card) 39'; Assoubre 68'; Cordero (yellow card) 85'; Emaná (yellow card) 90+3'; Lopo (red card) 90+6'	Report	Héctor Yuste (yellow card) 21'; Joan Oriol (yellow card) 37'; Brandon 46' 87' (yellow card) 90+5'; Antonio Raillo (yellow card) 66'; Lago (yellow card) 90+2'	Stadium: Nou Estadi de Tarragona; Attendance: 5,731; Referee: (Spain) Oliver De La Fuente

5 November 2016 13	Mallorca	2–2	Real Zaragoza	Palma
20:00	Culio 62'; Joan Oriol (yellow card) 72'; Lekić 76'	Report	Silva (yellow card) 4'; Juan Muñoz 39'; José Enrique 70'; Fran Rodriguez (yellow card) 75'	Stadium: Iberostar Stadium; Attendance: 8,178; Referee: (Spain) Valentín Pizarro

11 November 2016 14	Córdoba	0–2	Mallorca	Córdoba
20:00	Guillermo Donoso (yellow card) 38'; Antoñito (yellow card) 52'; Borja Domínguez (yellow card) 88'	Report	Thierry Moutinho 63'; Joan Oriol (yellow card) 72'; Brandon 78'	Stadium: Estadio Nuevo Arcángel; Attendance: 11,946; Referee: (Spain) Adrián Cordero

19 November 2016 15	Mallorca	2–2	Sevilla Atlético	Palma
18:00	Joan Oriol (yellow card) 48'; Brandon 59'; Lago 74'; Héctor Yuste (yellow card) 89'	Report	Ivi 25' (red card) 90+6'; Eteki (yellow card) 40'; Marc Gual 43'; Fede (yellow card) 53'; Churripi (yellow card) 54'; Bernardo (yellow card) 90+4'; Matos (yellow card) 90+5' (yellow-red card); Schetino (yellow card) 90+5'	Stadium: Iberostar Stadium; Attendance: 10,140; Referee: (Spain) Rubén Eiriz

27 November 2016 16	Elche	1–0	Mallorca	Elche
12:00	Rober Correa (yellow card) 10'; Álex (yellow card) 37'; Juan Carlos (yellow card) 39'; Pablo Hervías (yellow card) 40'; Armando (yellow card) 54'; Guillermo 68' (yellow card) 89'	Report	Antonio Raillo (yellow card) 28' (yellow-red card); Julio Pleguezuelo (yellow card) 86' (yellow-red card)	Stadium: Estadio Manuel Martínez Valero; Attendance: 7,253; Referee: (Spain) Juan López

4 December 2016 17	Mallorca	0- 3	Valladolid	Palma
18:00	Damià Sabater (yellow card) 39'	Report	José 47'; Álex López (yellow card) 67' (goal) 76'; Michel 90'	Stadium: Iberostar Stadium; Attendance: 9,768; Referee: (Spain) Víctor Areces

11 December 2016 18	Almería	2–1	Mallorca	Almería
12:00	Ángel Trujillo (yellow card) 10'; José Ángel Pozo (yellow card) 17'; Antonio Puertas 20' (yellow card) 87'; Fidel 54' (pen.); Jorge Morcillo (yellow card) 70'	Report	Brandon (yellow card) 33'; Lekić (yellow card) 67' (goal) 85'; Culio (yellow card) 70'; Joan Oriol (yellow card) 73'	Stadium: Estadio de los Juegos Mediterráneos; Attendance: 6,784; Referee: (Spain) David Pérez

18 December 2016 19	Numancia	3–1	Mallorca	Soria
18:00	Pablo Valcarce 16'; Manu del Moral (yellow card) 40' (goal) 45' 57'; Adrián Ripa (yellow card) 51'	Report	Julio Pleguezuelo (yellow card) 3'; Juan Rodríguez 19'; Lago (yellow card) 21'; Cabrero (yellow card) 45'; Brandon (yellow card) 45+1' (yellow-red card); Lekić (yellow card) 59'; Culio (yellow card) 79'; Pol Roigé (yellow card) 89'	Stadium: Nuevo Estadio Los Pajaritos; Attendance: 2,512; Referee: (Spain) David Medié

6 January 2017 20	Mallorca	2–0	Mirandés	Palma
18:00	Lekić 81'; Lago 90+2' (yellow card) 90+2'	Report	Usero (yellow card) 12'; Maikel Mesa (yellow card) 73'	Stadium: Iberostar Stadium; Attendance: 7,707; Referee: (Spain) Gorka Sagues

15 January 2017 21	Getafe	1–1	Mallorca	Getafe
12:00	Jorge Molina 82' (pen.)	Report	Alberto García 12' (o.g.); Eduard Campabadal (yellow card) 35'; Antonio Raillo (yellow card) 55'; Brandon (yellow card) 78'; Juan Rodríguez (yellow card) 80'; Lekić (yellow card) 86'	Stadium: Coliseum Alfonso Pérez; Attendance: 7,919; Referee: (Spain) Saúl Ais

22 January 2017 22	Reus	1–1	Mallorca	Reus
16:00	Jorge Díaz (red card) 65'; Máyor 76'	Report	Lekić 17' (yellow card) 61'; Saúl (yellow card) 39' (yellow-red card); Héctor Yuste (yellow card) 43'	Stadium: Estadi Municipal de Reus; Attendance: 3,863; Referee: (Spain) Pedro Pérez

29 January 2017 23	Mallorca	0–0	Cádiz	Palma
18:00	Antonio Raillo (yellow card) 59'	Report	Israfilov (yellow card) 20'; Aridane Hernández (yellow card) 45+2'; Jon Ander Garrido (yellow card) 79'; Álvaro García (yellow card) 90'	Stadium: Iberostar Stadium; Attendance: 9,941; Referee: (Spain) Adrián Cordero

5 February 2017 24	Real Oviedo	2–1	Mallorca	Oviedo
12:00	Toché 8'; David Costas (yellow card) 30' (goal) 71'; Néstor Susaeta (yellow card) 77'	Report	Antonio Raillo (yellow card) 36' (goal) 40'; Lekić (yellow card) 52'; Juan Domínguez (yellow card) 54'; Zdjelar (yellow card) 76'	Stadium: Estadio Carlos Tartiere; Attendance: 11,933; Referee: (Spain) Juan Pulido

12 February 2017 25	Mallorca	2–1	Rayo Vallecano	Palma
20:00	Lago 15'; Culio 21' (pen.)	Report	Raúl Baena (yellow card) 20'; Álex Moreno 47'; José Dorado (yellow card) 49'; Antonio Amaya (yellow card) 57'; Fran Beltrán (yellow card) 74'	Stadium: Iberostar Stadium; Attendance: 7,719; Referee: (Spain) Oliver De La Fuente

18 February 2017 26	Girona	1–0	Mallorca	Girona
20:00	Sandaza (yellow card) 31'; Juanpe 88'; Eloi Amagat (yellow card) 90'	Report	Culio (yellow card) 36' (yellow-red card); Zdjelar (yellow card) 51'; Eduard Campabadal (yellow card) 78'; Lago (yellow card) 90+1'	Stadium: Estadi Montilivi; Attendance: 5,640; Referee: (Spain) Isidro Díaz de Mera

25 February 2017 27	Mallorca	1–4	Tenerife	Palma
18:00	Juan Domínguez 6' (yellow card) 66'	Report	Aarón Ñíguez (yellow card) 33' (goal) 53' 75' (pen.); Antonio Raillo 48' (o.g.); Diedhiou 61'	Stadium: Iberostar Stadium; Attendance: 8,237; Referee: (Spain) David Pérez

5 March 2017 28	UCAM Murcia	1–1	Mallorca	Murcia
12:00	Tito (yellow card) 35'; Tekio (yellow card) 72'; Mejía 82' (pen.)	Report	Antonio Raillo 16' (yellow card) 90'; Culio (yellow card) 70'; Miquel Parera (yellow card) 88'	Stadium: Estadio de La Condomina; Attendance: 4,060; Referee: (Spain) Eduardo Prieto

11 March 2017 29	Mallorca	1–1	Lugo	Palma
16:00	Angeliño (yellow card) 19'; Lekić 87'	Report	Caballero 17'; Carlos Pita (yellow card) 38'; Miquel (yellow card) 61'; Fede Vico (yellow card) 72'; Jordi Calavera (yellow card) 72'; Carlos Hernández (yellow card) 79'	Stadium: Iberostar Stadium; Attendance: 7,660; Referee: (Spain) Juan Pulido

18 March 2017 30	Huesca	2–1	Mallorca	Huesca
18:00	David Ferreiro (yellow card) 8'; Gonzalo Melero 57' (yellow card) 73'; Íñigo López (yellow card) 76'; Kilian Grant (yellow card) 89' (yellow-red card); González 90+4'	Report	Héctor Yuste (yellow card) 45'; Angeliño (yellow card) 49'; Lago Junior (yellow card) 52'; Lekić (yellow card) 61'; Thierry Moutinho 88'	Stadium: Estadio El Alcoraz; Attendance: 3,268; Referee: (Spain) Francisco Arias

25 March 2017 31	Mallorca	1–1	Levante	Palma
20:30	Antonio Raillo (yellow card) 54'; Ansotegi 71'; Culio (yellow card) 76'; Angeliño (yellow card) 87'	Report	Jason 16'; Róber (yellow card) 31' (yellow-red card); Sergio Postigo (yellow card) 64'	Stadium: Iberostar Stadium; Attendance: 7,153; Referee: (Spain) Juan López

31 March 2017 32	Alcorcón	1–0	Mallorca	Alcorcón
20:00	Owona 47'	Report	Angeliño (yellow card) 60'; Biel Company (yellow card) 61'; Culio (yellow card) 65'	Stadium: Santo Domingo; Attendance: 3,549; Referee: (Spain) Jorge Valdés

8 April 2017 33	Mallorca	0–0	Gimnàstic de Tarragona	Palma
16:00	Zdjelar (yellow card) 32'; Héctor Yuste (yellow card) 55'; Angeliño (yellow card) 75'	Report	Mossa (yellow card) 45+2'; Xavi Molina (yellow card) 69'; Juan Muñiz (yellow card) 90+4'	Stadium: Iberostar Stadium; Attendance: 9,842; Referee: (Spain) Pedro Pérez

16 April 2017 34	Real Zaragoza	1–0	Mallorca	Zaragoza
20:30	Ángel 35'	Report	Brandon (yellow card) 44'	Stadium: La Romareda; Attendance: 15,180; Referee: (Spain) Adrián Cordero

23 April 2017 35	Mallorca	1–1	Córdoba	Palma
16:00	Junior 3'; Eduard Campabadal (yellow card) 78'	Report	Pedro Ríos 21'; Antoñito (yellow card) 60'; Sergio Aguza (yellow card) 90+1'; Rodri (yellow card) 90+2'; Kieszek (yellow card) 90+3'	Stadium: Iberostar Stadium; Attendance: 10,828; Referee: (Spain) Víctor Areces

30 April 2017 36	Sevilla Atlético	2–3	Mallorca	Seville
20:00	Fede (yellow card) 27'; Bernardo (yellow card) 30'; Ivi López 55' 85' (pen.)	Report	Junior (yellow card) 8'; Brandon 31' (pen.); Culio (yellow card) 51'; Thierry Moutinho 54' 63' (yellow card) 77'; Joan Oriol (yellow card) 76'; Pol Roigé (yellow card) 90+3'	Stadium: Ramón Sánchez Pizjuán Stadium; Attendance: 2,264; Referee: (Spain) Oliver De La Fuente

6 May 2017 37	Mallorca	1–0	Elche	Palma
16:00	Julio Pleguezuelo (yellow card) 14'; Álex Vallejo (yellow card) 29'; Junior 90+3'	Report	Túñez (yellow card) 39'	Stadium: Iberostar Stadium; Attendance: 12,479; Referee: (Spain) Jorge Figueroa

13 May 2017 38	Valladolid	2–1	Mallorca	Valladolid
13:00	Raúl de Tomás 32' (pen.) 81'; José (yellow card) 50'; Álex Pérez (yellow card) 50'	Report	Héctor Yuste (yellow card) 50'; Álex Vallejo (yellow card) 77'; Lekić 89'	Stadium: Estadio José Zorrilla; Attendance: 8,807; Referee: (Spain) Juan López

20 May 2017 39	Mallorca	1–0	Almería	Palma
19:00	Brandon 34'; Thierry Moutinho (yellow card) 58'	Report	Jorge Morcillo (yellow card) 34'; Ximo Navarro (yellow card) 90+1'	Stadium: Iberostar Stadium; Attendance: 12,830; Referee: (Spain) Rubén Eiriz

28 May 2017 40	Mallorca	0–0	Numancia	Palma
18:00	Angeliño (yellow card) 37'; Julio Pleguezuelo (yellow card) 45+1'; Santamaría (yellow card) 90+2'	Report	Dani Nieto (yellow card) 20'; Alberto Escassi (yellow card) 25'; Dani Calvo (yellow card) 83'; Marc Mateu (red card) 90+1'	Stadium: Iberostar Stadium; Attendance: 14,016; Referee: (Spain) Gorka Sagues

4 June 2017 41	Mirandés	2–2	Mallorca	Miranda de Ebro
20:00	Maikel Mesa 3'; Guarrotxena 34' (yellow card) 35'; Kijera (yellow card) 71'; Sergio Pérez (yellow card) 90+1'	Report	Culio 40'; Joan Oriol (yellow card) 83'; Lekić 87'	Stadium: Estadio Municipal de Anduva; Attendance: 1,534; Referee: (Spain) Juan Pulido

10 June 2017 42	Mallorca	3–3	Getafe	Palma
20:30	Brandon 24' 58'; Šćepović 69' (o.g.)	Report	Šćepović 7' 62'; David Fuster (yellow card) 36'; Buendía 85'	Stadium: Iberostar Stadium; Attendance: 3,618; Referee: (Spain) Pablo González

=== Copa del Rey ===
7 September 2016 Second Round	Mallorca	1–0 (a.e.t.)	Reus	Palma
22:00	Pol Roigé (yellow card) 31'; Joan Oriol (yellow card) 78'; Brandon 93'	Report	Rafa García (yellow card) 61'; Ricardo Vaz (yellow card) 86'	Stadium: Iberostar Stadium; Attendance: 4,790; Referee: (Spain) Juan Pulido

12 October 2016 Third Round	Mallorca	1–2	UCAM Murcia	Palma
12:00	Lekić (yellow card) 37'; Diogo Salomão 56'; Joan Oriol (yellow card) 85'	Report	Juanma 5'; Jesús Imaz 70'; Fran Pérez (yellow card) 72'; Fernando (yellow card) 76'	Stadium: Iberostar Stadium; Attendance: 5,651; Referee: (Spain) David Medié
