= Rubén Lobato =

Rubén Lobato may refer to:

- Rubén Lobato (cyclist) (born 1978), Spanish road cyclist
- Rubén Lobato (footballer) (born 1994), Spanish footballer
