= 2011–12 Villarreal CF season =

Villarreal
2011–12 season
- President: Fernando Roig
- Head coach: Juan Carlos Garrido; (until 21 December); José Francisco Molina; (from 22 December to 18 March); Miguel Ángel Lotina; (from 19 March)
- Stadium: El Madrigal
- La Liga: 18th (relegated)
- Copa del Rey: Round of 32
- UEFA Champions League: Group stage
- Top goalscorer: League: Marco Ruben (9); All: Marco Ruben (9)
Home colours	Away colours

The 2011–12 season was Villarreal Club de Fútbol's 89th season in existence and the club's 12th consecutive season in the top flight of Spanish football. It covered a period from 1 July 2011 to 30 June 2012.

Villarreal competed in La Liga and participated in the UEFA Champions League, entering in the play-off round due to their fourth-place finish in the 2010–11 La Liga. They entered the Copa del Rey in the Round of 32. This season would end Villarreal's streak in La Liga; on the final day of the season they lost 1–0 to Atlético Madrid, sending them down to 18th and relegating the side to the second division for the first time since the 1999–2000 season.

== Players ==
=== Squad information ===
As of 1 September 2011

The numbers are established according to the official website:www.villarrealcf.es and www.lfp.es

Note: Flags indicate national team as defined under FIFA eligibility rules; some limited exceptions apply. Players may hold more than one non-FIFA nationality.

No.	Pos.	Nation	Player
1	GK	ESP	César
2	DF	ARG	Gonzalo Rodríguez (vice-captain)
3	DF	ESP	Joan Oriol
4	DF	ARG	Mateo Musacchio
5	DF	ESP	Carlos Marchena
6	DF	ESP	Ángel
7	FW	BRA	Nilmar
8	MF	NED	Jonathan de Guzmán
9	FW	ARG	Marco Ruben
10	MF	ESP	Cani
11	MF	PAR	Hernán Pérez
12	DF	COL	Cristián Zapata
13	GK	ESP	Diego López

No.	Pos.	Nation	Player
14	DF	ESP	Mario
15	DF	ESP	José Catalá
17	MF	ESP	Javier Camuñas
18	MF	GHA	Wakaso Mubarak
19	MF	ESP	Marcos Senna (captain)
20	MF	ESP	Borja Valero
21	MF	ESP	Bruno
22	FW	ITA	Giuseppe Rossi
23	FW	ARG	Alejandro Martinuccio
24	GK	ESP	Diego Mariño
27	FW	ESP	Gerard Bordas
38	DF	FRA	Florian Lejeune
41	FW	ESP	Joselu

=== Transfers ===
==== In ====
No.	Pos.	Nat.	Name	Age	EU	Moving from	Type	Transfer window	Ends	Transfer fee	Source
18	MF	(Spain)	Cristóbal	27	EU	Elche	Loan return	Summer		N/A	
12	ST	(United States)	Jozy Altidore	21	Non-EU	Bursaspor (Turkey)	Loan return	Summer	2014	N/A	
23	LW	(Ecuador)	Jefferson Montero	21	Non-EU	Levante	Loan return	Summer		N/A	Marca.com
	CB	(Spain)	Iván Marcano	24	EU	Getafe	Loan return	Summer		N/A	
1	GK	(Spain)	César	39	EU	Valencia	Transfer	Summer	2012	Free	AS.com
17	LW	(Spain)	Javier Camuñas	31	EU	Osasuna	Transfer	Summer	2014	€2.3M	AS.com
12	CB	(Colombia)	Cristián Zapata	24	EU	Udinese (Italy)	Transfer	Summer	2016	€7M	marca.com
8	MF	(Netherlands)	Jonathan de Guzmán	23	EU	Mallorca	Transfer	Summer	2016	€8M	marca.com
23	ST	(Spain)	Gerard Bordas	29	EU	Youth system	Promoted	Summer		Youth system	

Total expenditure: ▼€9.3 million

==== Out ====
No.	Pos.	Nat.	Name	Age	EU	Moving to	Type	Transfer window	Transfer fee	Source
	CB	(Spain)	Iván Marcano	24	EU	Olympiacos (Greece)	Loan	Summer	N/A	AS.com
17	MF	(Spain)	Javier Matilla	22	EU	Betis	Transfer	Summer	€1.2M	AS.com
23	LW	(Ecuador)	Jefferson Montero	21	Non-EU	Betis	Loan	Summer	N/A	marca.com
24	RB	(Brazil)	Cicinho	31	EU	Roma (Italy)	Loan return	Summer	N/A	marca.com
8	MF	(Spain)	Santi Cazorla	26	EU	Málaga	Transfer	Summer	€19M	malagacf.com
11	LB	(Spain)	Joan Capdevila	33	EU	Benfica (Portugal)	Transfer	Summer	Free	villarrealcf.es
12	ST	(United States)	Jozy Altidore	21	Non-EU	AZ (Netherlands)	Transfer	Summer	Free	sun-sentinel.com
18	CM	(Spain)	Cristóbal	27	EU	Karpaty Lviv (Ukraine)	Transfer	Summer	Free	AS.com
25	GK	(Spain)	Juan Carlos	23	EU	Elche	Loan	Summer	N/A	elchecf.org
1	GK	(Spain)	Xavi Oliva	35	EU		End of contract	Summer	Free	

Total income: ▲€20.2 million

== Club ==
=== Coaching staff ===
Position	Staff
Head coach	Juan Carlos Garrido
Assistant coach	Raúl Garrido
Physical trainers	Carlos Corberán, Javi Ramos
Team delegate	Enrique Basauri
Representative	Iñaki Morán
Medical services	Manuel Tello
Physiotherapists	Víctor Salinas, Fernando Granell, Alfonso Calvo
Pitch delegate	Juan Ansuátegui Roca
Kit managers	Pasqualet, Jorge Garrido, Adrián Ortells

Source: Villarrealcf.es

== Pre-season and friendlies ==
Win Draw Loss Postponed

16 July 2011 Friendly	UCD Dublin (Republic of Ireland)	4–3	(Spain) Villarreal	Dublin, Ireland
21:00 CEST (UTC+2)	O'Connor 21'; Leahy 21'; Boyle 62'; Oriol 80' (o.g.)	Report	Valero 13'; Ruben 48'; Cazorla 69'	Stadium: UCD Bowl; Attendance: 1,000; Referee: Damien Hancock

19 July 2011 Friendly	Aberdeen (Scotland)	0–1	(Spain) Villarreal	Aberdeen, Scotland
21:00 CEST (UTC+2)		Report	Rossi 52'	Stadium: Pittodrie Stadium; Attendance: 11,000; Referee: Allan Crawford

24 July 2011 Friendly	Wolfsburg (Germany)	2–2	(Spain) Villarreal	Wolfsburg, Germany
17:00 CEST (UTC+2)	Mandžukić 52'; Lakić 79'	Report	Camuñas 30'; Rossi 47'	Stadium: Volkswagen Arena; Attendance: 17,000

31 July 2011 Trofeo de la Cerámica	Villarreal (Spain)	3–1	(Italy) Lazio	Villarreal, Spain
22:00 CEST (UTC+2)	Rossi 14'; Cani 20'; Wakaso 74'	Report	Cissé 45'	Stadium: El Madrigal; Referee: Juan Martínez Munuera

5 July 2011 Friendly	Everton (England)	0–1	(Spain) Villarreal	Liverpool, England
20:45 CEST (UTC+2)		Report	Rossi 63'	Stadium: Goodison Park

7 August 2011 Friendly	Wigan Athletic (England)	1–0	(Spain) Villarreal	Wigan, England
18:00 CEST (UTC+2)	Moses 44'	Report		Stadium: DW Stadium; Attendance: 5,000; Referee: John Moss

10 August 2011 Friendly	Elche (Spain)	0–2	(Spain) Villarreal	Elche, Spain
19:00 CEST (UTC+2)		Report	Zapata 45'; Gullón 88'	Stadium: Manuel Martínez Valero

== Competitions ==
=== Overall record ===
Competition	First match	Last match	Starting round	Final position	Record							
Competition	First match	Last match	Starting round	Final position	Pld	W	D	L	GF	GA	GD	Win %
La Liga	29 August 2011	21 May 2012	Matchday 1	18th	38	9	14	15	39	53	−14	23.68
Copa del Rey	13 December 2011	21 December 2011	Round of 32	Round of 32	2	0	1	1	1	3	−2	0.00
UEFA Champions League	17 August 2011	7 December 2011	Play-off round	Group stage	8	1	0	7	5	15	−10	12.50
Total					48	10	15	23	45	71	−26	20.83

Source: Competitions

=== La Liga ===
==== League table ====
Pos	Team	Pld	W	D	L	GF	GA	GD	Pts	Qualification or relegation
16	Zaragoza	38	12	7	19	36	61	−25	43 (Note: RVA 0–0 ZAR; ZAR 1–2 RVA)	
17	Granada	38	12	6	20	35	56	−21	42	
18	Villarreal (R)	38	9	14	15	39	53	−14	41	Relegation to the Segunda División
19	Sporting Gijón (R)	38	10	7	21	42	69	−27	37	Relegation to the Segunda División
20	Racing Santander (R)	38	4	15	19	28	63	−35	27	Relegation to the Segunda División

Source: ESPN
Rules for classification: 1st points; 2nd head-to-head points; 3rd head-to-head goal difference; 4th head-to-head goals scored; 5th goal difference; 6th number of goals scored; 7th Fair-play points
(R) Relegated

==== Results summary ====
Overall								Home						Away					
Pld	W	D	L	GF	GA	GD	Pts	W	D	L	GF	GA	GD	W	D	L	GF	GA	GD
37	7	15	15	36	51	−15	36	6	11	3	26	20	+6	1	4	12	10	31	−21

Last updated: 13 May 2012.
Source: Competitive matches

==== Results by round ====
Round	1	2	3	4	5	6	7	8	9	10	11	12	13	14	15	16	17	18	19	20	21	22	23	24	25	26	27	28	29	30	31	32	33	34	35	36	37	38
Ground	A	H	A	H	A	H	A	H	A	H	A	H	A	A	H	A	H	A	H	H	A	H	A	H	A	H	A	H	A	H	A	H	H	A	H	A	A	H
Result	L	D	L	W	D	D	D	L	L	W	D	W	L	L	D	L	D	L	W	D	W	W	L	D	L	L	L	D	W	D	L	W	D	D	D	D	L	L
Position	19	17	19	13	13	12	14	16	18	13	13	12	13	15	17	17	18	19	17	18	17	15	17	17	17	17	17	17	16	17	17	17	16	17	17	16	16	18

Source: La Liga
A = Away; H = Home; W = Win; D = Draw; L = Loss

==== Matches ====
20 August 2011 1	Villarreal	v	Sporting de Gijón	Villarreal
18:00 CEST (UTC+2)				Stadium: El Madrigal
Note: Postponed to 22 January due to AFE strike after failing to reach a collective bargaining agreement with the LFP.

29 August 2011 2	Barcelona	5–0	Villarreal	Barcelona
21:00 CEST (UTC+2)	Thiago 25'; Mascherano (yellow card) 33'; Fàbregas (yellow card) 35', (goal) 45'; Sánchez 47', (yellow card) 48'; Messi 52', 74'	Report	Zapata (yellow card) 21'; Wakaso (yellow card) 84'; Marchena (yellow card) 88'	Stadium: Camp Nou; Attendance: 95,000; Referee: Javier Turienzo Álvarez

10 September 2011 3	Villarreal	2–2	Sevilla	Villarreal
18:00 CEST (UTC+2)	D. López (red card) 22'; Rossi 35' (pen.); Ruben 72'; De Guzmán (yellow card) 75'; César (yellow card) 79'	Report	Negredo (penalty missed) 24' 24', (yellow card) 28'; Manu (yellow card) 42'; Kanouté (yellow card) 61'; Alexis (yellow card) 76', (goal) 86'	Stadium: El Madrigal; Attendance: 20,000; Referee: Fernando Teixeira Vitienes

17 September 2011 4	Granada	1–0	Villarreal	Granada
18:00 CEST (UTC+2)	Martins (yellow card) 6'; Yebda (yellow card) 17'; Moisés (yellow card) 27'; Mainz (yellow card) 51'; Uche 56'; M. Rico (yellow card) 76'; Diakhaté (yellow card) 78'; Nyom (yellow card) 90'	Report	Catalá (yellow card) 36'; Rossi (penalty missed) 79'; Musacchio (yellow card) 90'	Stadium: Los Cármenes; Attendance: 14,000; Referee: Javier Estrada Fernández

20 September 2011 5	Villarreal	2–0	Mallorca	Villarreal
22:00 CEST (UTC+2)	Rossi 8'; Nilmar 52'	Report	Pina (yellow card) 42'; Tissone (yellow card) 44'; Flores (yellow card) 90'	Stadium: El Madrigal; Attendance: 20,000; Referee: José Luis González

24 September 2011 6	Athletic Bilbao	1–1	Villarreal	Bilbao
18:00 CEST (UTC+2)	Gabilondo 43'; Ekiza (yellow card) 45' (yellow-red card) 81'; Amorebieta (yellow card) 56'; Martínez (yellow card) 60'; Muniain (yellow card) 87'	Report	Nilmar 53'; Musacchio (yellow card) 58'	Stadium: San Mamés; Attendance: 35,000; Referee: Ignacio Iglesias Villanueva

1 October 2011 7	Villarreal	2–2	Real Zaragoza	Villarreal
18:00 CEST (UTC+2)	Rossi (yellow card) 40', (goal) 41' (pen.); Pérez 84'	Report	Juárez (yellow card) 24'; Lanzaro (yellow card) 27' (yellow-red card) 80'; García 35'; Barrera 45'; Paredes (yellow card) 66'; Roberto (yellow card) 87'	Stadium: El Madrigal; Attendance: 19,500; Referee: Carlos del Cerro Grande

15 October 2011 8	Getafe	0–0	Villarreal	Getafe
18:00 CEST (UTC+2)	Sarabia (yellow card) 35'; Valera (yellow card) 48'; Pérez (yellow card) 62'; Míchel (yellow card) 77'	Report	Gonzalo (yellow card) 14'; Valero (yellow card) 57'; Catalá (yellow card) 59'; Rossi (yellow card) 71'; Marchena (yellow card) 75'	Stadium: Coliseum Alfonso Pérez; Attendance: 12,500; Referee: José Teixeira Vitienes

23 October 2011 9	Villarreal	0–3	Levante	Villarreal
22:00 CEST (UTC+2)	Ruben (yellow card) 72'; Rossi (yellow card) 76'	Report	Juanlu 16', 43'; Torres (yellow card) 22'; Koné 58'	Stadium: El Madrigal; Attendance: 11,000; Referee: Carlos Delgado Ferreiro

26 October 2011 10	Real Madrid	3–0	Villarreal	Madrid
22:00 CEST (UTC+2)	Benzema 5'; Kaká 11', (yellow card) 53'; Alonso (yellow card) 21'; Di María 30'	Report	Musacchio (yellow card) 16'; Catalá (yellow card) 46'; Ruben (yellow card) 54'	Stadium: Santiago Bernabéu; Attendance: 70,000; Referee: Miguel Ángel Pérez Lasa

29 October 2011 11	Villarreal	2–0	Rayo Vallecano	Villarreal
18:00 CEST (UTC+2)	Bruno 20', (yellow card) 71'; Senna (penalty missed) 39'; Valero 67'; Catalá (yellow card) 73'; D. López (yellow card) 85'	Report	Jordi (yellow card) 20'; Arribas (yellow card) 34'; Piti (yellow card) 34'; Fuego (yellow card) 38'; Michu (yellow card) 72'	Stadium: El Madrigal; Attendance: 17,000; Referee: Javier Turienzo Álvarez

6 November 2011 12	Espanyol	0–0	Villarreal	Cornellà de Llobregat
18:00 CET (UTC+1)	Vilà (yellow card) 41'; Forlín (yellow card) 64' (yellow-red card) 75'	Report	De Guzmán (yellow card) 62'; Gonzalo (yellow card) 72'; Bruno (yellow card) 88'	Stadium: Cornellà-El Prat; Attendance: 29,500; Referee: David Fernández Borbalán

19 November 2011 13	Villarreal	1–0	Real Betis	Villarreal
18:00 CET (UTC+1)	Valero 21', (yellow card) 77'; Bruno (yellow card) 38'; Ruben (yellow card) 43'; Musacchio (yellow card) 69'; D. López (yellow card) 90'	Report	Isidoro (yellow card) 6'; Castro (yellow card) 40'	Stadium: El Madrigal; Attendance: 17,500; Referee: César Muñiz Fernández

28 November 2011 14	Málaga	2–1	Villarreal	Málaga
21:00 CET (UTC+1)	Toulalan 5', (yellow card) 65' (yellow-red card) 75'; Isco 40'; Caballero (yellow card) 79'; Buonanotte (yellow card) 88'	Report	Ruben 16', (yellow card) 45'; Ángel (yellow card) 33'; Bruno (yellow card) 36'; Gonzalo (yellow card) 72'; Pérez (yellow card) 87'	Stadium: La Rosaleda; Attendance: 27,500; Referee: Carlos Velasco Carballo

3 December 2011 15	Racing de Santander	1–0	Villarreal	Santander
18:00 CET (UTC+1)	Stuani 27'; Adrián (yellow card) 38'; Toño (yellow card) 66'	Report	Musacchio (yellow card) 69'; Mario (yellow card) 80'; De Guzmán (yellow card) 90'	Stadium: El Sardinero; Attendance: 13,000; Referee: Pedro Pérez Montero

11 December 2011 16	Villarreal	1–1	Real Sociedad	Villarreal
16:00 CET (UTC+1)	Zapata (yellow card) 58'; Oriol (yellow card) 61'; Ruben 71'	Report	González (yellow card) 2'; Zurutuza (yellow card) 11'; Elustondo (yellow card) 34' (yellow-red card) 62'; Aranburu 52'	Stadium: El Madrigal; Attendance: 16,000; Referee: Alberto Undiano Mallenco

18 December 2011 17	Osasuna	2–1	Villarreal	Pamplona
18:00 CET (UTC+1)	Sergio (yellow card) 5', (goal) 81'; Ibrahima 74'; Timor (yellow card) 80'	Report	Camuñas (yellow card) 63'; Ruben 63', (yellow card) 90'	Stadium: Reyno de Navarra; Attendance: 17,000; Referee: Carlos Delgado Ferreiro

8 January 2012 18	Villarreal	2–2	Valencia	Villarreal
18:00 CET (UTC+1)	Ruben 14', (yellow card) 74'; Gonzalo 18'; Soriano (yellow card) 22'; Cani (yellow card) 22'; Zapata (yellow card) 33'; Oriol (yellow card) 36'	Summary	Jonas (yellow card) 25'; Soldado (yellow card) 35'; Feghouli 41'; Banega (yellow card) 70'; Miguel (yellow card) 74'; Aduriz 87'	Stadium: El Madrigal; Attendance: 18,000; Referee: David Fernández Borbalán

15 January 2012 19	Atlético Madrid	3–0	Villarreal	Madrid
12:00 CET (UTC+1)	Falcao 40', 52' (pen.); Turan (yellow card) 59'; Tiago (yellow card) 62'; Diego (yellow card) 71', (goal) 80'	Summary	D. López (yellow card) 50'; Gonzalo (yellow card) 51'	Stadium: Vicente Calderón; Attendance: 40,000; Referee: Javier Turienzo Álvarez

23 January 2012 1	Villarreal	3–0	Sporting de Gijón	Villarreal
21:00 CET (UTC+1)	Musacchio (yellow card) 15'; Ruben 57'; Valero 59'; Bruno 90+1'	Summary	Borral (yellow card) 26'; Botía (yellow card) 80'; Canella (yellow card) 90+2'	Stadium: El Madrigal; Attendance: 16,000; Referee: Alfonso Álvarez Izquierdo

28 January 2012 21	Villarreal	0–0	Barcelona	Villarreal
21:00 CET (UTC+1)	Musacchio (yellow card) 30'; Ruben (yellow card) 41'; Senna (yellow card) 69'; Joselu (yellow card) 77'; Gonzalo (yellow card) 84'	Summary	Thiago (yellow card) 89'; Alves (yellow card) 90+2'	Stadium: El Madrigal; Attendance: 20,000; Referee: José Teixeira Vitienes

5 February 2012 22	Sevilla	1–2	Villarreal	Seville
18:00 CET (UTC+1)	Coke (yellow card) 28'; Bruno 34' (o.g.); Escudé (yellow card) 52'	Summary	Valero 22'; Bruno (yellow card) 54'; Gonzalo (yellow card) 56'; Camuñas (yellow card) 66'; Cani (yellow card) 75'; Camuñas 81'; Oriol (yellow card) 90' (yellow-red card) 90+2'	Stadium: Ramón Sánchez Pizjuán; Attendance: 45,000; Referee: Carlos del Cerro Grande

12 February 2012 23	Villarreal	3–1	Granada	Villarreal
19:45 CET (UTC+1)	Ruben 16'; Cani (yellow card) 53'; Valero 64'; Júlio César 73' (o.g.); Marchena (yellow card) 90+1'	Summary	Ighalo (yellow card) 30'; Jara (yellow card) 32'; López 50'; Diakhaté (yellow card) 71' (yellow-red card) 88'	Stadium: El Madrigal; Attendance: 21,000; Referee: Miguel Pérez Lasa

19 February 2012 24	Mallorca	4–0	Villarreal	Palma
18:00 CET (UTC+1)	Tissone (yellow card) 31'; Nunes (yellow card) 33', (goal) 68'; Crespí (yellow card) 36'; Víctor 41', 65'; Martí 52'; Pina (yellow card) 87'	Summary	Senna (yellow card) 15'; D. López (yellow card) 39'	Stadium: Iberostar; Attendance: 14,500; Referee: Alfonso Álvarez Izquierdo

26 February 2012 25	Villarreal	2–2	Athletic Bilbao	Villarreal
12:00 CET (UTC+1)	Senna 11', (yellow card) 18'; Nilmar 68'	Summary	Aurtenetxe (yellow card) 50'; Llorente 62'; Pérez (yellow card) 64'; Susaeta 66'; Toquero (yellow card) 66'; Iturraspe (yellow card) 75'	Stadium: El Madrigal; Attendance: 16,000; Referee: Ignacio Iglesias

4 March 2012 26	Real Zaragoza	2–1	Villarreal	Zaragoza
12:00 CET (UTC+1)	García 85'; Paredes (yellow card) 89'; Apoño (yellow card) 90+3'; Abraham 90+3'	Summary	Martinuccio 16', (yellow card) 42'; Nilmar (yellow card) 29'; Marchena (yellow card) 90+2'	Stadium: La Romareda; Attendance: 24,000; Referee: José González González

12 March 2012 27	Villarreal	1–2	Getafe	Villarreal
21:00 CET (UTC+1)	Gonzalo (yellow card) 26'; Nilmar 45' (pen.); Bruno (yellow card) 54'	Report	Castro 6'; Míchel (yellow card) 17'; Alexis (yellow card) 28'; Díaz (yellow card) 45'; Barrada 72'	Stadium: El Madrigal; Attendance: 18,000; Referee: Pedro Pérez Montero

18 March 2012 28	Levante	1–0	Villarreal	Valencia
12:00 CET (UTC+1)	Valdo (yellow card) 14'; Venta (yellow card) 45'; Juanfran (yellow card) 85'; Torres 90+2'	Report	Zapata (yellow card) 6'; Castellani (yellow card) 45+1'; Martinuccio (yellow card) 75'; Pérez (yellow card) 84'; Nilmar (yellow card) 86'; Marchena (yellow card) 89' (yellow-red card) 90'	Stadium: Ciutat de València; Attendance: 14,000; Referee: Carlos Clos Gómez

22 March 2012 29	Villarreal	1–1	Real Madrid	Villarreal
22:00 CET (UTC+1)	Senna (yellow card) 20', (goal) 83'; Mario (yellow card) 32'; Ángel (yellow card) 34'; Ruben (yellow card) 55'; De Guzmán (yellow card) 76'	Report	Diarra (yellow card) 5'; Alonso (yellow card) 38'; Pepe (yellow card) 45+1'; Ramos (yellow card) 53' (yellow-red card) 85'; Ronaldo 62'; Özil (red card) 85'; Khedira (yellow card) 88'; Higuaín (yellow card) 90+5'	Stadium: El Madrigal; Attendance: 20,000; Referee: José Luis Paradas Romero

25 March 2012 30	Rayo Vallecano	0–2	Villarreal	Madrid
19:45 CET (UTC+1)	Casado (yellow card) 4'; Arribas (yellow card) 54'; Tito (yellow card) 60'	Report	Ruben 29'; Bruno (yellow card) 63'; Ángel 85'	Stadium: Vallecas; Attendance: 10,000; Referee: Miguel Pérez Lasa

2 April 2012 31	Villarreal	0–0	Espanyol	Villarreal
21:30 CEST (UTC+2)	Zapata (yellow card) 42'	Summary	Weiss (yellow card) 15'; Uche (yellow card) 28'; Gómez (yellow card) 54'; Casilla (yellow card) 88'	Stadium: El Madrigal; Attendance: 17,000; Referee: José González González

8 April 2012 32	Real Betis	3–1	Villarreal	Seville
21:00 CEST (UTC+2)	Paulão (yellow card) 21'; Santa Cruz 35'; Castro 38'; Pereira (yellow card) 42'; Montero (yellow card) 58'; Beñat 59'; Fabricio (yellow card) 90+3'	Summary	Ángel (yellow card) 16' (yellow-red card) 66'; Oriol (yellow card) 38'; Ruben 90+3' (pen.)	Stadium: Benito Villamarín; Attendance: 37,000; Referee: Carlos Velasco Carballo

12 April 2012 33	Villarreal	2–1	Málaga	Villarreal
20:00 CEST (UTC+2)	Senna 83' (pen.); Pérez 90+4'	Report	Duda (yellow card) 33'; Eliseu (yellow card) 58'; Cazorla 65'; Kameni (red card) 81'; Camacho (yellow card) 90+3'; Van Nistelrooy (yellow card) 90+5'	Stadium: El Madrigal; Attendance: 14,000; Referee: Alfonso Álvarez Izquierdo

15 April 2012 34	Villarreal	1–1	Racing de Santander	Villarreal
--:-- CEST (UTC+2)				Stadium: El Madrigal

22 April 2012 35	Real Sociedad	1–1	Villarreal	San Sebastián
--:-- CEST (UTC+2)				Stadium: Anoeta

29 April 2012 36	Villarreal	1–1	Osasuna	Villarreal
--:-- CEST (UTC+2)	Bruno 44'		García 73'	Stadium: El Madrigal

1 May 2012 20	Sporting de Gijón	2–3	Villarreal	Gijón
--:-- CEST (UTC+2)	Lora 40'; Álex Gálvez 85'		Mario 19'; Senna 43' (pen.); Pérez 56'	Stadium: El Molinón

6 May 2012 37	Valencia	1–0	Villarreal	Valencia
--:-- CEST (UTC+2)	Jonas 90+1'			Stadium: Mestalla

13 May 2012 38	Villarreal	0–1	Atlético Madrid	Villarreal
--:-- CEST (UTC+2)			Falcao 88'	Stadium: El Madrigal

=== Copa del Rey ===
==== Round of 32 ====
13 December 2011 First Leg	Mirandés	1–1	Villarreal	Miranda de Ebro
21:00 CET (UTC+1)	Arroyo 26', (yellow card) 45'; Iribas (yellow card) 38'	Report	Pérez (yellow card) 22'; Musacchio (yellow card) 40'; Bruno (yellow card) 60'; Valero 85'	Stadium: Estadio Anduva; Attendance: 4,100; Referee: Carlos Clos Gómez

21 December 2011 Second Leg	Villarreal	0–2 (1–3 agg.)	Mirandés	Villarreal
21:00 CET (UTC+1)	Musacchio (yellow card) 58' (red card) 89'	Report	Asier (yellow card) 35'; Blanco (yellow card) 38'; Infante 60', 87'	Stadium: El Madrigal; Attendance: 12,000; Referee: Miguel Pérez Lasa

=== UEFA Champions League ===
==== Play-off round ====
17 August 2011 First leg	Odense (Denmark)	1–0	(Spain) Villarreal	Odense, Denmark
20:45 CET (UTC+1)	Gíslason (yellow card) 13'; Høegh (yellow card) 49'; Andreasen 84'; Johansson (yellow card) 89'	Report	Musacchio (yellow card) 13'; Valero (yellow card) 31'; Oriol (yellow card) 54'; Bruno (yellow card) 71'	Stadium: TRE-FOR Park; Attendance: 13,002; Referee: Damir Skomina (Slovenia)

23 August 2011 Second leg	Villarreal (Spain)	3–0 (3–1 agg.)	(Denmark) Odense	Villarreal, Spain
20:45 CET (UTC+1)	Musacchio (yellow card) 36'; Senna (yellow card) 41'; Rossi 50', 66'; Cani (yellow card) 59'; Camuñas (yellow card) 73'; Valero (red card) 76'; Marchena 82'; Gonzalo (yellow card) 86'	Report	Traoré (yellow card) 16'; Kadrii (yellow card) 18' (yellow-red card) 70'; Mendy (yellow card) 59'; Johansson (yellow card) 77'; Djemba-Djemba (yellow card) 78'	Stadium: El Madrigal; Attendance: 18,000; Referee: Craig Thomson (Scotland)

==== Group stage ====
Times up to 29 October 2011 (matchdays 1–3) are CEST (UTC+02:00), thereafter (matchdays 4–6) times are CET (UTC+01:00).

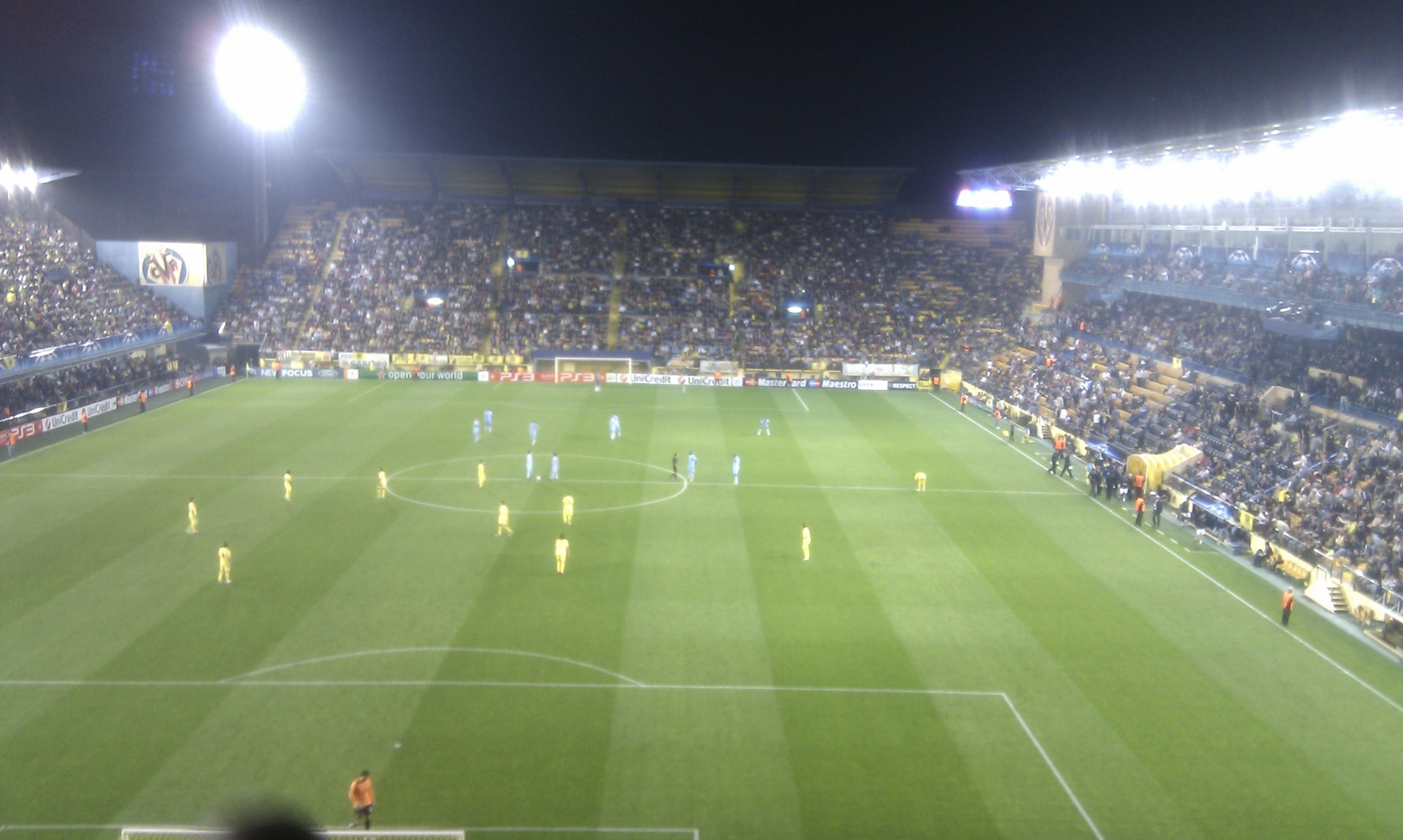
Group A match between Villarreal and Manchester City.

Pos	Team	Pld	W	D	L	GF	GA	GD	Pts	Qualification	BAY	NAP	MCI	VIL
1	(Germany) Bayern Munich	6	4	1	1	11	6	+5	13	Advance to knockout phase	—	3–2	2–0	3–1
2	(Italy) Napoli	6	3	2	1	10	6	+4	11	Advance to knockout phase	1–1	—	2–1	2–0
3	(England) Manchester City	6	3	1	2	9	6	+3	10	Transfer to Europa League	2–0	1–1	—	2–1
4	(Spain) Villarreal	6	0	0	6	2	14	−12	0		0–2	0–2	0–3	—

Source: Soccerway

14 September 2011 1	Villarreal (Spain)	0–2	(Germany) Bayern Munich	Villarreal, Spain
20:45 CEST (UTC+2)	Marchena (yellow card) 56'	Report	Kroos 7'; Tymoshchuk (yellow card) 53'; Rafinha 76'; Schweinsteiger (yellow card) 78'	Stadium: El Madrigal; Referee: Cüneyt Çakır (Turkey)

27 September 2011 2	Napoli (Italy)	2–0	(Spain) Villarreal	Naples, Italy
20:45 CEST (UTC+2)	Aronica (yellow card) 5'; Hamšík 15'; Cavani 17' (pen.); Cannavaro (yellow card) 57'	Report	Gonzalo (yellow card) 16'; Cani (yellow card) 85'; Rossi (yellow card) 85'	Stadium: San Paolo; Referee: Frank De Bleeckere (Belgium)

18 October 2011 3	Manchester City (England)	2–1	(Spain) Villarreal	Manchester, England
20:45 CEST (UTC+2)	Marchena 43' (o.g.); Agüero 90+3'	Report	Cani 4'; Catalá (yellow card) 32'; Rossi (yellow card) 68'; Mario (yellow card) 90+2'; D. López (yellow card) 90+4'	Stadium: Etihad Stadium; Referee: Pavel Královec (Czech Republic)

2 November 2011 4	Villarreal (Spain)	0–3	(England) Manchester City	Villarreal, Spain
20:45 CET (UTC+1)	Wakaso (yellow card) 27'; Catalá (yellow card) 39'; Musacchio (yellow card) 45+2'; Marchena (yellow card) 45+3'; Pérez (yellow card) 68'	Report	Y. Touré 30', 71'; Balotelli (yellow card) 27', (goal) 45+3' (pen.)	Stadium: El Madrigal; Referee: Pedro Proença (Portugal)

22 November 2011 5	Bayern Munich (Germany)	3–1	(Spain) Villarreal	Munich, Germany
20:45 CET (UTC+1)	Ribéry 3', 69'; Gómez 24'	Report	Valero (yellow card) 20'; Ruben (yellow card) 42'; De Guzmán 50'; Ángel (yellow card) 61'	Stadium: Allianz Arena; Referee: Markus Strömbergsson (Sweden)

7 December 2011 6	Villarreal (Spain)	0–2	(Italy) Napoli	Villarreal, Spain
20:45 CET (UTC+1)	De Guzmán (yellow card) 4'; Zapata (yellow card) 22'; Pérez (yellow card) 38'; Ángel (yellow card) 90'	Report	Inler 65'; Hamšík 76'; Campagnaro (yellow card) 90'	Stadium: El Madrigal; Referee: Svein Oddvar Moen (Norway)

Last updated: 10 August 2011.
Source: Villarreal CF

== See also ==
- 2011–12 Copa del Rey
- 2011–12 La Liga
- 2011–12 UEFA Champions League
