= Joan Oriol =

Spanish footballer (born 1986)

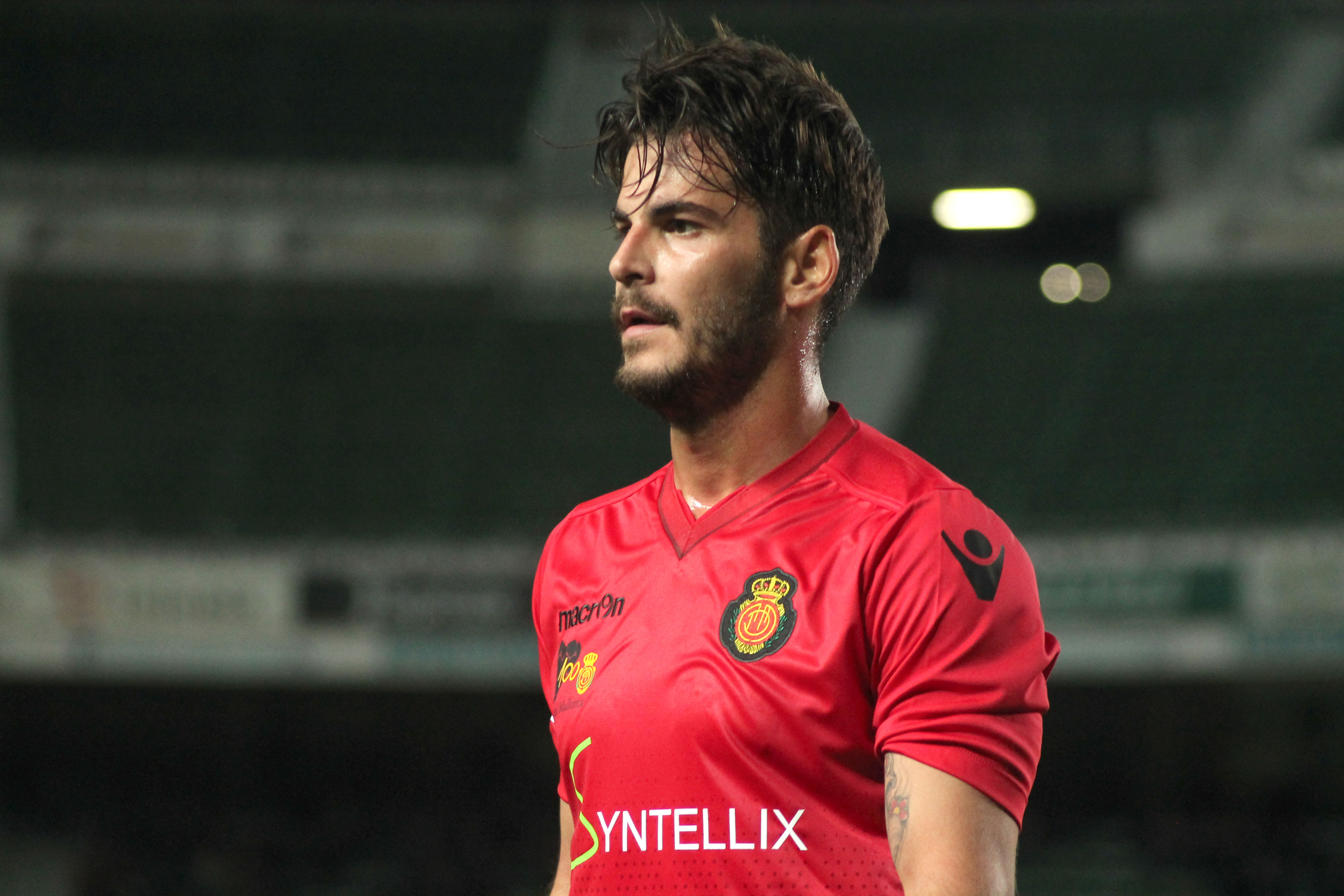
- Oriol in 2016

Personal information
- Full name: Joan Oriol Gràcia
- Date of birth: 5 November 1986 (age 40)
- Place of birth: Cambrils, Spain
- Height: 1.75 m (5 ft 9 in)
- Position: Left-back

Team information
- Current team: Gimnàstic (youth)

Youth career
- 2004–2005: Cambrils

Senior career*
Years	Team	Apps	(Gls)
2005–2007	Pobla Mafumet		
2006–2007	→ Reus (loan)	33	(0)
2007–2008	Gavà	34	(2)
2008–2010	Villarreal B	66	(3)
2010–2013	Villarreal	50	(0)
2013–2014	Osasuna	11	(0)
2014–2015	Blackpool	11	(0)
2015	Rapid București	13	(0)
2015–2017	Mallorca	62	(1)
2017–2018	Atromitos	0	(0)
2018	Cornellà	9	(0)
2018–2020	Lleida Esportiu	61	(2)
2020–2025	Gimnàstic	168	(14)
Total		485	(22)

Managerial career
- 2025–: Gimnàstic (youth)
- * Club domestic league appearances and goals

Joan Oriol Gràcia (Catalan pronunciation: [ʒuˈan uɾiˈɔl]; born 5 November 1986) is a Spanish former professional footballer who played as a left-back. He is the manager of the Juvenil A squad of Gimnàstic de Tarragona.

== Club career ==
Born in Cambrils, Tarragona, Catalonia, Oriol played lower league or amateur football in his first four years as a senior. In the 2008–09 season he helped Villarreal CF's B team promote to Segunda División for the first time ever, scoring two goals in 32 games.

Oriol made his debut for the main squad on 6 January 2010, playing the full 90 minutes and being booked in a 1–1 away draw against RC Celta de Vigo in the round of 16 of the Copa del Rey. On 27 November of that year he made his first appearance in La Liga, starting in a 3–0 victory at Real Zaragoza.

From 2011 to 2013, Oriol was both relegated and promoted with the Yellow Submarine, featuring in an average of 22 matches in the process. On 2 July 2013, the free agent signed a three-year contract with CA Osasuna, with a €5 million clause.

In early August 2014, following Osasuna's relegation, Oriol agreed to a one-year deal with the option of a further year with Football League Championship side Blackpool, linking up with his twin brother Eduard. On 12 January 2015, his contract was terminated by mutual consent.

On 4 July 2015, after a short spell at FC Rapid București in Romania, Oriol signed a two-year contract with RCD Mallorca. On 28 August 2017, after being relegated to Segunda División B, he agreed to a 1+1 deal at Atromitos F.C. from Greece.

Oriol returned to Spain in January 2018, signing for UE Cornellà of the third division. He remained in that tier the following years, representing Lleida Esportiu and Gimnàstic de Tarragona.

On 8 July 2025, Oriol accepted Nàstic's offer to become the new manager of the club's Juvenil A squad, and retired from professional football at the age of 38.

== Personal life ==
Oriol's twin brother, Eduard, was also a footballer. A winger, he shared teams with his sibling on several occasions.

== Career statistics ==
Appearances and goals by club, season and competition
Club	Season	League			National Cup		Continental		Other		Total	
Club	Season	Division	Apps	Goals	Apps	Goals	Apps	Goals	Apps	Goals	Apps	Goals
Gavà	2007–08	Segunda División B	34	2	—		—		2 (Note: Appearances in Segunda División B play-offs)	0	36	2
Villarreal B	2008–09	Segunda División B	32	2	—		—		5	0	37	2
Villarreal B	2009–10	Segunda División	34	1	—		—		—		34	1
Villarreal B	Total		66	3	—		—		5	0	71	3
Villarreal	2008–09	La Liga	0	0	0	0	—		—		0	0
Villarreal	2009–10	La Liga	0	0	1	0	—		—		1	0
Villarreal	2010–11	La Liga	6	0	4	0	3 (Note: Appearances in UEFA Europa League)	0	—		13	0
Villarreal	2011–12	La Liga	21	0	1	0	5 (Note: Appearances in UEFA Champions League)	0	—		27	0
Villarreal	2012–13	Segunda División	23	0	1	0	—		—		24	0
Villarreal	Total		50	0	7	0	8	0	—		65	0
Osasuna	2013–14	La Liga	11	0	3	0	—		—		14	0
Blackpool	2014–15	Championship	11	0	1	0	—		—		12	0
Rapid București	2014–15	Liga I	13	0	0	0	—		—		13	0
Mallorca	2015–16	Segunda División	39	1	0	0	—		—		39	1
Mallorca	2016–17	Segunda División	23	0	2	0	—		—		25	0
Mallorca	Total		62	1	2	0	—		—		64	1
Atromitos	2017–18	Super League Greece	0	0	2	0	—		—		2	0
Cornellà	2017–18	Segunda División B	9	0	0	0	—		2	0	11	0
Lleida Esportiu	2018–19	Segunda División B	36	1	3	0	—		—		39	1
Lleida Esportiu	2019–20	Segunda División B	25	1	1	0	—		—		26	1
Lleida Esportiu	Total		61	2	4	0	—		—		65	2
Gimnàstic	2020–21	Segunda División B	26	2	0	0	—		—		26	2
Gimnàstic	2021–22	Primera División RFEF	37	2	1	0	—		2 (Note: Appearances in Primera División RFEF promotion play-offs)	0	40	2
Gimnàstic	2022–23	Primera Federación	34	4	3	0	—		—		37	4
Gimnàstic	2023–24	Primera Federación	37	1	1	0	—		4 (Note: Appearances in Primera Federación promotion play-offs)	0	42	1
Gimnàstic	2024–25	Primera Federación	34	5	1	0	—		4	1	39	6
Gimnàstic	Total		168	14	6	0	—		10	1	184	15
Career total			485	22	25	0	8	0	19	1	537	23
