= Lago Junior =

Ivorian footballer (born 1990)

Personal information
- Full name: Lago Junior Wakalible
- Date of birth: 31 December 1990 (age 35)
- Place of birth: Abidjan, Ivory Coast
- Height: 1.80 m (5 ft 11 in)
- Position: Winger

Team information
- Current team: San Roque

Youth career
- Joël Tiéhi

Senior career*
Years	Team	Apps	(Gls)
2007–2008	Issia Wazy	29	(17)
2009–2013	Numancia	68	(6)
2010–2011	→ Eibar (loan)	32	(9)
2013–2015	Gimnàstic	72	(13)
2015–2016	Mirandés	22	(7)
2016–2023	Mallorca	196	(36)
2022	→ Huesca (loan)	13	(0)
2023	Málaga	17	(4)
2023–2025	Racing Santander	46	(4)
2025–2026	Lugo	35	(1)
2026–	San Roque	0	(0)

International career
2020–2021	Ivory Coast	5	(0)
- * Club domestic league appearances and goals as of 23 May 2026

Lago Junior Wakalible (born 31 December 1990), known as Junior, is an Ivorian professional footballer who plays as a winger for Tercera Federación club San Roque.

== Club career ==
=== Numancia ===
Born in Abidjan, Junior began his football career at the Centre de Formation Joël Tiéhi, a school founded by former player Joël Tiéhi. He made his senior debut with Issia Wazy in 2007, scoring at an excellent rate.

On 31 January 2009, Junior moved to Spain and signed a five-and-a-half-year contract with CD Numancia. He made his La Liga debut on 18 April, playing ten minutes in a 3–0 away loss against Atlético Madrid. He only appeared in four more matches until the end of the season, all as a substitute, and the Soria team were relegated as 19th.

Junior joined SD Eibar on 27 August 2010, in a season-long loan. Two days later, he scored twice on his official debut for the Segunda División B club, a 2–1 home win over CF Palencia.

=== Gimnàstic and Mirandés ===
On 13 July 2013, after a further two Segunda División campaigns with Numancia, Junior remained in the country and signed for Gimnàstic de Tarragona from division three. On 22 July 2015, after achieving promotion, he moved to CD Mirandés of the second tier.

=== Mallorca ===
On 28 January 2016, Junior agreed to a €300,000 deal at second-division RCD Mallorca. After suffering relegation at the end of the 2016–17 campaign he went on to help the side to earn two consecutive promotions, netting a career-best 11 goals in 2018–19.

Junior subsequently lost his importance in the squad. In December 2021, he was loaned to SD Huesca.

On 11 January 2023, Junior terminated his contract by mutual consent.

=== Later career ===
Immediately after leaving Mallorca, Junior joined Málaga CF on a free transfer, signing until June 2024 with an option for another year. On 15 June 2023, having been relegated, he moved to fellow second-tier club Racing de Santander on a two-year contract.

Junior agreed to a deal at Primera Federación's CD Lugo in summer 2025. On 14 August 2026, the 35-year-old joined amateurs CD San Roque de Lepe.

== International career ==
Junior won his first cap for the Ivory Coast national team on 13 October 2020 at the age of nearly 30, replacing Gervinho late into the 1–0 friendly defeat to Japan in Utrecht, Netherlands.

== Career statistics ==
=== Club ===
As of 11 January 2023

Appearances and goals by club, season and competition
Club	Season	League			Cup		Other		Total	
Club	Season	Division	Apps	Goals	Apps	Goals	Apps	Goals	Apps	Goals
Numancia	2008–09	La Liga	5	0	0	0	—		5	0
Numancia	2009–10	Segunda División	22	3	1	0	—		23	3
Numancia	2011–12	Segunda División	26	2	0	0	—		26	2
Numancia	2012–13	Segunda División	15	1	1	0	—		16	1
Numancia	Total		68	6	2	0	0	0	70	6
Eibar (loan)	2010–11	Segunda División B	32	9	0	0	4 (Note: Appearances in promotion playoffs)	0	36	9
Gimnàstic	2013–14	Segunda División B	37	10	4	0	5	2	46	12
Gimnàstic	2014–15	Segunda División B	35	3	1	0	4	2	40	5
Gimnàstic	Total		72	13	5	0	9	4	86	17
Mirandés	2015–16	Segunda División	22	7	5	2	—		27	9
Mallorca	2015–16	Segunda División	20	3	0	0	—		20	3
Mallorca	2016–17	Segunda División	40	6	0	0	—		40	6
Mallorca	2017–18	Segunda División B	26	8	0	0	4	1	30	9
Mallorca	2018–19	Segunda División	40	11	0	0	4	0	44	11
Mallorca	2019–20	La Liga	35	4	0	0	—		35	4
Mallorca	2020–21	Segunda División	24	4	2	0	—		26	4
Mallorca	2021–22	La Liga	6	0	0	0	—		6	0
Mallorca	2022–23	La Liga	5	0	1	0	—		6	0
Mallorca	Total		196	36	3	0	8	1	207	41
Career total			374	72	15	2	21	5	426	78

=== International ===
Appearances and goals by national team and year
National team	Year	Apps	Goals
Ivory Coast	2020	3	0
Ivory Coast	2021	2	0
Total		5	0
