= Eder Vilarchao =

Spanish footballer

Personal information
- Full name: Eder Vilarchao Ruiz
- Date of birth: 9 February 1990 (age 36)
- Place of birth: Barakaldo, Spain
- Height: 1.83 m (6 ft 0 in)
- Position: Midfielder

Youth career
- 1999–2000: Santutxu
- 2000–2007: Athletic Bilbao
- 2007–2009: Santutxu

Senior career*
Years	Team	Apps	(Gls)
2009–2011	Basconia	62	(4)
2011–2012	Sestao	27	(5)
2012–2013	Betis B	18	(3)
2013–2015	Betis	1	(0)
Total		108	(12)
- * Club domestic league appearances and goals

Eder Vilarchao Ruiz (born 9 February 1990) is a Spanish former footballer who played as a midfielder.

== Club career ==
Born in Barakaldo, Biscay, Vilarchao played youth football for local Santutxu FC and Athletic Bilbao, joining the Lezama youth system at the age of ten and remaining there for seven years. He made his senior debuts in 2009–10, going on to appear two full seasons for CD Basconia – the farm team – in Tercera División; in the 2011 summer he joined neighbouring Sestao River Club, in Segunda División B.

In January 2012, Vilarchao was linked to various clubs, including Real Sociedad, CA Osasuna, Villarreal CF and Real Valladolid. In June, he eventually signed with Real Betis, being initially assigned to the reserves.

Vilarchao made his official debut with the Andalusians' first team on 13 January 2013, coming on as a substitute for Álvaro Vadillo in the 57th minute of a 2–0 La Liga home win against Levante UD. On the 17th he was handed his first start, playing 64 minutes in a 0–2 away loss to Atlético Madrid for the campaign's Copa del Rey.

On 24 January 2013, Vilarchao suffered an ankle injury, but still renewed his contract with the club until 2016 late in the month. In January 2014, now fully recovered, he was left out of both the first and second sides, in the latter case due to his age; in April he suffered another injury, being ruled out for the remainder of the season.

Vilarchao was not included in any Betis roster for 2014–15, despite being fully fit. On 18 November 2015, aged 25, he decided to retire from football after nearly three years struggling with several injuries.
