= Javier Camuñas =

Spanish footballer (born 1980)

Personal information
- Full name: Javier Camuñas Gallego
- Date of birth: 17 July 1980 (age 46)
- Place of birth: Madrid, Spain
- Height: 1.75 m (5 ft 9 in)
- Positions: Midfielder; striker

Youth career
- Parla Escuela
- Real Madrid
- Leganés

Senior career*
Years	Team	Apps	(Gls)
1999–2000	Atlético Pinto	33	(4)
2000–2002	Rayo Vallecano B		
2001–2002	→ Getafe (loan)	43	(8)
2002–2004	Rayo Vallecano	18	(0)
2003–2004	→ Ciudad Murcia (loan)	40	(8)
2004–2007	Xerez	115	(19)
2007–2009	Recreativo	71	(15)
2009–2011	Osasuna	67	(7)
2011–2013	Villarreal	27	(1)
2012–2013	→ Deportivo La Coruña (loan)	23	(1)
Total		437	(63)
- * Club domestic league appearances and goals

Javier Camuñas Gallego (born 17 July 1980) is a Spanish former professional footballer. A versatile midfielder (able to play as an attacking midfielder or in the wings), he could also operate as a second striker.

He amassed La Liga totals of 205 games and 24 goals over the course of eight seasons, representing in the competition Rayo Vallecano, Recreativo, Osasuna, Villarreal and Deportivo. He added 155 matches and 27 goals in the Segunda División, mainly with Xerez.

== Club career ==
After starting out at modest and local club CA Pinto, Madrid-born Camuñas switched to neighbours Rayo Vallecano, first representing its reserves. He was then loaned to another team from the capital, Getafe CF (by that time in the Segunda División B).

Camuñas returned to Rayo for the 2002–03 season, making his La Liga debut on 1 September 2002 in a 2–2 home draw against Deportivo Alavés. Rayo finished the campaign last and he went on to have four steady years in the Segunda División, with Ciudad de Murcia and Xerez CD, totalling 18 league goals in his final two.

Having been acquired by top-flight Recreativo de Huelva for 2007–08, Camuñas was one of the Andalusians' most important players as they barely avoided relegation. He played all the matches save one – 28 of those complete – and scored on five occasions.

In the following season, Camuñas scored even more (ten), but Recre finished last. In late August 2009, he signed a three-year contract with top-tier club CA Osasuna. Ever-present in his first year, he netted his first goal on 24 January 2010, against former side Xerez (2–1 away victory).

Camuñas was again first choice for Osasuna in 2010–11. On 30 January 2011, he scored the game's only goal in a home defeat of Real Madrid, which he had represented as a youth.

On 19 July 2011, Camuñas signed with Villarreal CF for three years. He struggled earn playing time in his first season, also suffering physical problems. He scored his first official goal for the Yellow Submarine on 5 February 2012, the last in a 2–1 win at Sevilla FC for the team's first away of the campaign, which eventually ended in relegation after 12 years.

Camuñas agreed to a one-year loan at Deportivo de La Coruña of the same league in August 2012. He met the same fate at the end of his only season, scoring in the 2–1 away loss against Osasuna on 20 January 2013.
