= Rubén Lobato (footballer) =

Spanish footballer (born 1994)

Personal information
- Full name: Rubén Lobato Cabal
- Date of birth: 9 March 1994 (age 32)
- Place of birth: Madrid, Spain
- Height: 1.80 m (5 ft 11 in)
- Position: Left-back

Team information
- Current team: Villanovense
- Number: 3

Youth career
- Rayo Vallecano

Senior career*
Years	Team	Apps	(Gls)
2013–2014	Alcalá	31	(1)
2014–2015	Atlético Madrid C	16	(1)
2015	→ Pontevedra (loan)	12	(0)
2015–2016	Lealtad	27	(0)
2016–2017	Fuenlabrada	10	(0)
2017	Mérida	2	(0)
2017–2019	Oviedo B	68	(2)
2019	Eibar	0	(0)
2019–2020	Getafe B	11	(1)
2020–2021	Burgos	33	(0)
2022	Górnik Łęczna	9	(0)
2023	Alcoyano	14	(0)
2023	Sestao River	10	(0)
2024–	Villanovense	5	(0)
- * Club domestic league appearances and goals as of 29 September 2024

Rubén Lobato Cabal (born 9 March 1994) is a Spanish professional footballer who plays for Villanovense. Mainly a left-back, he can also play as a left winger.

== Club career ==
Lobato was born in Madrid, and was a Rayo Vallecano youth graduate. On 5 August 2013 he signed for Tercera División side RSD Alcalá, and made his senior debut on 25 August in a 1–0 away win against CD San Fernando.

In 2014 Lobato joined Atlético Madrid and was assigned to the C-team also in the fourth division. The following 22 January he was loaned to fellow league team Pontevedra CF, and on 31 July 2015 he moved to Segunda División B side CD Lealtad in a permanent deal.

On 1 July 2016, Lobato agreed to a contract with CF Fuenlabrada in the third division. On 16 January of the following year, he moved to fellow league team Mérida AD.

In 2017, Lobato moved to Real Oviedo and was assigned to the reserves. On 3 July 2019, after two seasons as a starter, he moved straight to La Liga side SD Eibar on a three-year contract, but left the club just one-and-a-half-month later and subsequently signed for third division side Getafe CF B.

On 3 January 2020, Lobato signed for Burgos CF also in the third division. He helped the side to achieve promotion to Segunda División in the 2020–21 season, before terminating his contract on 15 July 2021.

On 1 February 2022, after six months of inactivity, Lobato moved abroad and agreed to a contract with Polish Ekstraklasa side GKS Górnik Łęczna. He made his professional debut on 9 May, replacing Daniel Dziwniel in a 1–1 home draw against Bruk-Bet Termalica Nieciecza. On 1 December 2022, he terminated his contract with the club by mutual consent.
