= Pol Roigé =

Spanish footballer

Personal information
- Full name: Pol Roigé Rodríguez
- Date of birth: 28 January 1994 (age 32)
- Place of birth: Barcelona, Spain
- Height: 1.78 m (5 ft 10 in)
- Positions: Winger; forward

Team information
- Current team: Intercity
- Number: 11

Youth career
- 2003–2005: Espanyol
- 2005–2011: Barcelona
- 2011–2012: Real Madrid
- 2012–2013: Cornellà

Senior career*
Years	Team	Apps	(Gls)
2013–2014	Cornellà	0	(0)
2013–2014	→ Castelldefels (loan)	33	(2)
2014–2015	Sabadell B	35	(6)
2015	Sabadell	23	(5)
2016–2019	Mallorca	46	(1)
2018	→ Celta B (loan)	10	(0)
2018–2019	→ Hércules (loan)	35	(0)
2019	Sundsvall	12	(1)
2020–2021	Petrolul Ploiești	28	(4)
2021–2025	Intercity	118	(14)
2025	Antequera	17	(3)
2025–	Intercity	26	(1)
- * Club domestic league appearances and goals as of 16 May 2026

Pol Roigé Rodríguez (Catalan: [ˈpɔl ruˈʒe ruˈðɾiɣəs], Spanish: [ˈpol roˈʝe roˈðɾiɣeθ]; born 28 January 1994) is a Spanish professional footballer who plays for Segunda Federación club Intercity. He mainly plays a right winger, he can also play as a forward.

== Club career ==
Born in Barcelona, Catalonia, Roigé played for RCD Espanyol and FC Barcelona's youth setup before joining Real Madrid on 26 July 2011. In the 2012 summer, however, he was released by the club and moved to Cornellà, finishing his graduation with the latter.

On 7 August 2013, Roigé was loaned to Tercera División club Castelldefels. He made his senior debut for the club, scoring two goals in 33 appearances. He moved to Sabadell on 27 June of the following year, being assigned to the reserves also in the fourth level. Roigé made his professional debut on 4 January 2015, coming on as a late substitute in a 1–0 home win against Recreativo de Huelva in the Segunda División. On 30 May he renewed his link with Sabadell, signing a two-year deal and being definitely promoted to the main squad.

On 11 January 2016 Roigé was transferred to Mallorca in the second tier, after scoring five goals during the first half of the campaign. He scored his first professional goal on 24 May, netting the winner in a 2–1 home success over Elche CF. Roigé subsequently had loan spells at Celta Vigo B and Hércules before moving abroad for the first time on 16 July 2019 with GIF Sundsvall. On 19 January 2020, Roigé joined Petrolul Ploiești in the Romanian second division.
