= 2023–24 RCD Mallorca season =

RCD Mallorca
2023–24 season
- President: Andy Kohlberg
- Head coach: Javier Aguirre
- Stadium: Estadi Mallorca Son Moix
- La Liga: 15th
- Copa del Rey: Runners-up
- Top goalscorer: League: Vedat Muriqi (7); All: Abdón (12)
Home colours	Away colours	Third colours

The 2023–24 season was Real Club Deportivo Mallorca's 108th season in existence and third consecutive season in La Liga. They also competed in the Copa del Rey, reaching the final.

== Players ==
=== First-team squad ===
As of 1 February 2024

Note: Flags indicate national team as defined under FIFA eligibility rules; some limited exceptions apply. Players may hold more than one non-FIFA nationality.

No.	Pos.	Nation	Player
1	GK	SRB	Predrag Rajković
2	DF	SRB	Matija Nastasić
3	DF	ESP	Toni Lato
4	DF	BEL	Siebe Van der Heyden
5	MF	GEQ	Omar Mascarell
6	DF	ESP	José Manuel Copete
7	FW	KOS	Vedat Muriqi
8	MF	ESP	Manu Morlanes
9	FW	ESP	Abdón Prats
10	MF	ESP	Sergi Darder
11	DF	ESP	Jaume Costa
12	MF	POR	Samú Costa

No.	Pos.	Nation	Player
13	GK	SVK	Dominik Greif
14	MF	ESP	Dani Rodríguez (vice-captain)
15	DF	ARG	Pablo Maffeo
17	FW	CAN	Cyle Larin
18	MF	ESP	Antonio Sánchez
19	FW	ESP	Javi Llabrés
20	DF	URU	Giovanni González
21	DF	ESP	Antonio Raíllo (captain)
22	DF	ESP	Nacho Vidal (on loan from Osasuna)
23	FW	SRB	Nemanja Radonjić (on loan from Torino)
24	DF	SVK	Martin Valjent (3rd captain)
25	GK	ESP	Iván Cuéllar

=== Reserve team ===
Note: Flags indicate national team as defined under FIFA eligibility rules; some limited exceptions apply. Players may hold more than one non-FIFA nationality.

No.	Pos.	Nation	Player
26	MF	ESP	Rubén Quintanilla
29	DF	ESP	Miguelito
31	DF	ESP	Yuzún Ley
32	DF	ESP	Marcos Fernández

No.	Pos.	Nation	Player
34	FW	ESP	Pau Mascaró
36	GK	ESP	Alex Quevedo
37	DF	ESP	Carles Sogorb

=== Out on loan ===
Note: Flags indicate national team as defined under FIFA eligibility rules; some limited exceptions apply. Players may hold more than one non-FIFA nationality.

No.	Pos.	Nation	Player
—	GK	ESP	Leo Román (at Oviedo until 30 June 2024)
—	GK	ESP	Pere García (at Sestao River until 30 June 2024)
—	DF	ESP	David López (at Elche until 30 June 2024)
—	DF	ESP	Josep Gayá (at Amorebieta until 30 June 2024)

No.	Pos.	Nation	Player
—	MF	GHA	Iddrisu Baba (at Almería until 30 June 2024)
—	MF	COL	Daniel Luna (at Mirandés until 30 June 2024)
—	FW	SEN	Amath Ndiaye (at Valladolid until 30 June 2024)

== Transfers ==
=== In ===
Pos.	Player	Transferred from	Fee	Date	Source
MF	(Spain) Manu Morlanes	(Spain) Villlarreal	€4,000,000	1 July 2023	
MF	(Equatorial Guinea) Omar Mascarell	(Spain) Elche	€800,000	1 July 2023	
DF	(Belgium) Siebe Van der Heyden	(Belgium) Union Saint-Gilloise	€2,500,000	18 July 2023	
FW	(Canada) Cyle Larin	(Spain) Valladolid	€7,500,000	3 August 2023	
MF	(Portugal) Samú Costa	(Spain) Almería	€3,000,000	10 August 2023	
MF	(Spain) Sergi Darder	(Spain) Espanyol	€8,000,000	11 August 2023	
DF	(Spain) Nacho Vidal	(Spain) Osasuna	Loan	26 January 2024	

=== Out ===
Pos.	Player	Transferred to	Fee	Date	Source
MF	(Spain) Iñigo Ruiz de Galarreta	(Spain) Athletic Bilbao	Free	1 July 2023	
FW	(Spain) Ángel Rodríguez	(Spain) Tenerife		2 July 2023	
MF	(South Korea) Lee Kang-in	(France) Paris Saint-Germain	€22,000,000	8 July 2023	
MF	(Ghana) Iddrisu Baba	(Spain) Almería	Loan	10 August 2023	
MF	(Senegal) Amath Ndiaye	(Spain) Real Valladolid	Loan	1 February 2024	
DF	(Argentina) Braian Cufré	(Argentina) Vélez Sarsfield	Free	12 February 2024	

Notes
1.Exercised buy option.

== Pre-season and friendlies ==
Win Draw Loss

14 July 2023 Friendly	Union Gurten	1–3	Mallorca	Gurten, Austria
18:00 UTC+2	Wimmleitner 58'		Maffeo 83'; Llabrés 85'; Abdón 89'	Stadium: Park21-Arena Gurten

17 July 2023 Friendly	Ried II	0–9	Mallorca	Austria
18:00 UTC+2			Maffeo 4'; Abdón 12', 40'; Ndiaye 33'; Muriqi 47', 53', (penalty missed) 78'; Luna 59' (pen.); Gayá 68'; Llabrés 73'

21 July 2023 Friendly	1. FC Köln	1–1	Mallorca	Austria
15:00 UTC+2

29 July 2023 Friendly	Sunderland	1–1	Mallorca	Sunderland, England
15:00 UTC+1				Stadium: Stadium of Light

6 August 2023 Friendly	Mallorca	1–1	Spezia	Palma
18:30 UTC+2				Stadium: Estadi Son Bibiloni

== Competitions ==
=== Overall record ===
Competition	First match	Last match	Starting round	Final position	Record							
Competition	First match	Last match	Starting round	Final position	Pld	W	D	L	GF	GA	GD	Win %
La Liga	12 August 2023	26 May 2024	Matchday 1	15th	38	8	16	14	33	44	−11	21.05
Copa del Rey	1 November 2023	6 April 2024	First round	Runners-up	8	5	3	0	16	4	+12	62.50
Total					46	13	19	14	49	48	+1	28.26

Source: Soccerway

=== La Liga ===
==== League table ====
Pos	Team	Pld	W	D	L	GF	GA	GD	Pts
13	Celta Vigo	38	10	11	17	46	57	−11	41 (Note: Celta Vigo finished ahead of Sevilla on head-to-head points: Celta Vigo 1–1 Sevilla, Sevilla 1–2 Celta Vigo.)
14	Sevilla	38	10	11	17	48	54	−6	41
15	Mallorca	38	8	16	14	33	44	−11	40 (Note: Mallorca finished ahead of Las Palmas on head-to-head points: Las Palmas 1–1 Mallorca, Mallorca 1–0 Las Palmas.)
16	Las Palmas	38	10	10	18	33	47	−14	40
17	Rayo Vallecano	38	8	14	16	29	48	−19	38

Source: LaLiga EA Sports
Rules for classification: 1) Points; 2) Head-to-head points; 3) Head-to-head goal difference; 4) Goal difference; 5) Goals scored; 6) Fair-play points
(Note: Head-to-head record is used only after all the matches between the teams in question have been played)

==== Results summary ====
Overall								Home						Away					
Pld	W	D	L	GF	GA	GD	Pts	W	D	L	GF	GA	GD	W	D	L	GF	GA	GD
38	8	16	14	33	44	−11	40	6	8	5	17	16	+1	2	8	9	16	28	−12

Source: La Liga

==== Results by round ====
Round	1	2	3	4	5	6	7	8	9	10	11	12	13	14	15	16	17	18	19	20	21	22	23	24	25	26	27	28	29	30	31	32	33	34	35	36	37	38
Ground	A	H	A	H	A	A	H	A	H	A	H	A	H	A	H	H	A	H	A	H	A	H	A	H	H	A	H	A	H	A	H	A	A	H	H	A	H	A
Result	D	L	L	D	W	L	D	D	D	L	D	L	D	L	D	W	D	W	L	D	D	L	L	W	L	D	W	L	W	D	L	L	D	L	W	D	D	W
Position	8	14	17	17	15	16	16	16	15	17	16	17	17	17	17	15	15	14	14	14	15	15	17	16	16	16	15	15	14	15	15	16	16	17	15	17	17	15

Source: La Liga
A = Away; H = Home; W = Win; D = Draw; L = Loss

==== Matches ====
The league fixtures were unveiled on 22 June 2023.

12 August 2023 1	Las Palmas	1–1	Mallorca	Las Palmas
19:30 CEST (UTC+2)	Viera 29' (pen.); Rodríguez (yellow card) 39'; Lemos (yellow card) 84'; Loiodice (yellow card) 84'	Report	Copete (yellow card) 28'; Muriqi (penalty missed) 41'; Mascarell (yellow card) 53'; Raíllo 70'	Stadium: Estadio Gran Canaria; Attendance: 24,100; Referee: Víctor García Verdura

18 August 2023 2	Mallorca	0–1	Villarreal	Palma
19:30 CEST (UTC+2)	Mascarell (yellow card) 2'; Valjent (yellow card) 73'	Report	Brereton (yellow card) 45'; Terrats (yellow card) 45+5'; Baena (yellow card) 51'; Gerard 62'; Comesaña (yellow card) 83'	Stadium: Estadi Mallorca Son Moix; Attendance: 17,775; Referee: Javier Alberola Rojas

26 August 2023 3	Granada	3–2	Mallorca	Granada
19:30 CEST (UTC+2)	Miguel Ángel 12'; Melendo (yellow card) 16'; Ruiz (yellow card) 41'; Zaragoza 46'; Uzuni 70' (pen.)	Report	Muriqi (penalty missed) 18'; Copete (yellow card) 33'; Abdón 38'; Rajković (yellow card) 41'; Rodríguez (yellow card) 45+2'; González (yellow card) 51'; Larin (yellow card) 68'; S. Costa 87'; Maffeo (yellow card) 90+4'; Llabrés (yellow card) 90+4'	Stadium: Nuevo Los Cármenes; Attendance: 16,368; Referee: Francisco José Hernández Maeso

3 September 2023 4	Mallorca	0–0	Athletic Bilbao	Palma
16:15 CEST (UTC+2)		Report	Lekue (yellow card) 44'	Stadium: Estadi Mallorca Son Moix; Attendance: 17,043; Referee: Jorge Figueroa Vázquez

16 September 2023 5	Celta Vigo	0–1	Mallorca	Vigo
18:30 CEST (UTC+2)	De la Torre (yellow card) 9'	Report	Nastasić (yellow card) 14'; Muriqi 85'; Rodríguez (yellow card) 87'; J. Costa (yellow card) 90+2'	Stadium: Balaídos; Attendance: 18,693; Referee: José Luis Munuera Montero

23 September 2023 6	Girona	5–3	Mallorca	Girona
14:00 CEST (UTC+2)	López 26'; Dovbyk 33' (pen.); Martín 37', (yellow card) 79'; Herrera 45'; Sávio 57'	Report	Muriqi 4' (pen.); S. Costa (yellow card) 31'; J. Costa (yellow card) 31'; Morlanes (yellow card) 33'; Rodríguez (yellow card) 38'; Abdón 88', 90+5'; Nastasić (yellow card) 90+1'	Stadium: Montilivi; Attendance: 11,511; Referee: Pablo González Fuertes

26 September 2023 7	Mallorca	2–2	Barcelona	Palma
21:30 CEST (UTC+2)	Muriqi 8'; Abdón 45+3'; Rodríguez (yellow card) 48'; Nastasić (yellow card) 61'	Report	Romeu (yellow card) 36'; Raphinha 41'; López 75'	Stadium: Estadi Mallorca Son Moix; Attendance: 19,938; Referee: Alejandro Muñiz Ruiz

30 September 2023 8	Rayo Vallecano	2–2	Mallorca	Madrid
16:15 CEST (UTC+2)	García 4'; López (yellow card) 43'; De Tomás (yellow card) 90+4'; Falcao 90+12' (pen.)	Report	Muriqi 44'; Sánchez 59'; Darder (yellow card) 83'; J. Costa (yellow card) 90+2'; González (yellow card) 90+4'; Amath (yellow card) 90+6'; Mascarell (yellow card) 90+10'	Stadium: Campo de Fútbol de Vallecas; Attendance: 11,991; Referee: Mario Melero López

7 October 2023 9	Mallorca	1–1	Valencia	Palma
18:30 CEST (UTC+2)	Rodríguez 5'; González (yellow card) 16'; S. Costa (yellow card) 36'	Report	López 45+3'; Pérez (yellow card) 69'; Gabriel (yellow card) 43'	Stadium: Estadi Mallorca Son Moix; Attendance: 17,659; Referee: José Hernández Maeso

21 October 2023 10	Real Sociedad	1–0	Mallorca	San Sebastián
14:00 CEST (UTC+2)	Zubeldia (yellow card) 47'; Méndez 64', (yellow card) 90+3'; Pacheco (yellow card) 71'	Report	Copete (yellow card) 15'; Lato (yellow card) 41'; Sánchez (yellow card) 43'	Stadium: Reale Arena; Attendance: 31,279; Referee: Jorge Figueroa Vázquez

28 October 2023 11	Mallorca	0–0	Getafe	Palma
18:30 CEST (UTC+2)		Report	Mata (yellow card) 75'	Stadium: Estadi Mallorca Son Moix; Attendance: 15,310; Referee: Pablo González Fuertes

4 November 2023 12	Real Betis	2–0	Mallorca	Seville
16:15 CET (UTC+1)	Pezzella (yellow card) 1'; Willian José 7'; Pérez 65'	Report	Valjent (yellow card) 16'; Mascarell (yellow card) 26' (yellow-red card) 45'; Larin (yellow card) 35'	Stadium: Benito Villamarín; Attendance: 50,909; Referee: Miguel Ángel Ortiz Arias

25 November 2023 14	Atlético Madrid	1–0	Mallorca	Madrid
21:00 CET (UTC+1)	Griezmann 64'	Report		Stadium: Cívitas Metropolitano; Attendance: 58,119; Referee: Juan Martínez Munuera

29 November 2023 13	Mallorca	1–1	Cádiz	Palma
21:00 CET (UTC+1)	Abdón 45+1'; Rodríguez (yellow card) 66'; Valjent (yellow card) 83'	Report	Alcaraz 12'; Roger (yellow card) 64'; Ocampo (yellow card) 80'; Mbaye (yellow card) 81'	Stadium: Estadi Mallorca Son Moix; Attendance: 13,821; Referee: Javier Iglesias Villanueva
Note: The match was originally scheduled for 12 November 2023, but was postponed due to the absence of Mallorca forward Vedat Muriqi, who was called up to the Kosovo national team earlier than anticipated for their UEFA Euro 2024 qualifier against Israel; the qualifier date had been pushed back as a result of the Gaza war.

3 December 2023 15	Mallorca	0–0	Alavés	Palma
14:00 CET (UTC+1)	Sánchez (yellow card) 24'; Amath (yellow card) 36'; S. Costa (yellow card) 46'; Morlanes (yellow card) 90+7'	Report	Guevara (yellow card) 27'; Abqar (yellow card) 72'	Stadium: Estadi Mallorca Son Moix; Attendance: 15,090; Referee: Jorge Figueroa Vázquez

9 December 2023 16	Mallorca	1–0	Sevilla	Palma
21:00 CET (UTC+1)	Larin 11'; J. Costa (yellow card) 68'; Abdón (yellow card) 90+3'	Report	En-Nesyri (yellow card) 45+2'; Soumaré (yellow card) 74'	Stadium: Estadi Mallorca Son Moix; Attendance: 16,041; Referee: Javier Alberola Rojas

17 December 2023 17	Almería	0–0	Mallorca	Almería
14:00 CET (UTC+1)	Baba (yellow card) 73'; Baptistão (yellow card) 83'; Robertone (yellow card) 87'	Report	Nastasić (yellow card) 89'	Stadium: Power Horse Stadium; Attendance: 11,936; Referee: Pablo González Fuertes

21 December 2023 18	Mallorca	3–2	Osasuna	Palma
21:30 CET (UTC+1)	Nastasić 12'; Raíllo (yellow card) 28', (goal) 62'; Maffeo (yellow card) 47'; Rodríguez 53'; J. Costa (yellow card) 79'	Report	Ibáñez 7'; Ra. García 90+1'; Ávila (yellow card) 90+5'	Stadium: Estadi Mallorca Son Moix; Attendance: 14,192; Referee: Mario Melero López

3 January 2024 19	Real Madrid	1–0	Mallorca	Madrid
19:15 CET (UTC+1)	Rodrygo (yellow card) 35'; Lunin (yellow card) 45+2'; Rüdiger 78'	Report	Van der Heyden (yellow card) 1'; Nastasić (yellow card) 61'; Maffeo (yellow card) 70'	Stadium: Santiago Bernabéu; Attendance: 72,394; Referee: Alejandro Muñiz Ruiz

13 January 2024 20	Mallorca	1–1	Celta Vigo	Palma
16:15 CET (UTC+1)	Larin (yellow card) 37', (goal) 43'; González (yellow card) 45+3'; Abdón (yellow card) 88'; Copete (yellow card) 89'	Report	Aspas 10'; Larsen (yellow card) 82'	Stadium: Estadi Mallorca Son Moix; Attendance: 21,130; Referee: Víctor García Verdura

20 January 2024 21	Villarreal	1–1	Mallorca	Villarreal
16:15 CET (UTC+1)	Sørloth (yellow card) 44', (goal) 45+1'; Reina (red card) 62'; Femenía (yellow card) 82'	Report	Larin (yellow card) 27'; Darder (yellow card) 83'; Llabrés 90+1'	Stadium: Estadio de la Cerámica; Attendance: 16,479; Referee: Miguel Ángel Ortiz Arias
Note: Reina was sent off for dissent as an unused substitute.

27 January 2024 22	Mallorca	0–1	Real Betis	Palma
21:00 CET (UTC+1)	Lato (yellow card) 75'; J. Costa (yellow card) 90+5'	Report	Altimira 45+1'; Silva (yellow card) 79'	Stadium: Estadi Mallorca Son Moix; Attendance: 20,051; Referee: Javier Iglesias Villanueva

2 February 2024 23	Athletic Bilbao	4–0	Mallorca	Bilbao
21:00 CET (UTC+1)	Berchiche 3', 16'; Guruzeta 62'; Muniain 89'	Report	Larin (yellow card) 75'	Stadium: San Mamés; Attendance: 47,061; Referee: Jorge Figueroa Vázquez

11 February 2024 24	Mallorca	2–1	Rayo Vallecano	Palma
16:15 CET (UTC+1)	Nastasić (yellow card) 1'; Muriqi (yellow card) 39', (goal) 90+1'; Rodríguez (yellow card) 41'; Sánchez 48'; Abdón (yellow card) 90+5'	Report	García 76'	Stadium: Estadi Mallorca Son Moix; Attendance: 16,735; Referee: José Luis Munuera Montero

18 February 2024 25	Mallorca	1–2	Real Sociedad	Palma
18:30 CET (UTC+1)	Sánchez 4', (yellow card) 31'; Rajković (yellow card) 45+1'; Raíllo (yellow card) 45+3' (yellow-red card) 45+4'; Nastasić (yellow card) 82'; S. Costa (yellow card) 90'; Darder (yellow card) 90+6'; Van der Heyden (red card) 90+7'; Rodríguez (yellow card) 90+7'; Muriqi (yellow card) 90+7'	Report	Kubo 38'; Le Normand (yellow card) 41'; Zubeldia (yellow card) 61'; Pacheco (yellow card) 77'; Merino 90+3', (yellow card) 90+6'; Turrientes (yellow card) 90+6'	Stadium: Estadi Mallorca Son Moix; Attendance: 18,153; Referee: Pablo González Fuertes

24 February 2024 26	Alavés	1–1	Mallorca	Vitoria-Gasteiz
18:30 CET (UTC+1)	Benavídez 76'	Report	Vidal (yellow card) 54'; Nastasić 88'; Larin (yellow card) 90+6'	Stadium: Mendizorrotza; Attendance: 16,102; Referee: Víctor García Verdura

3 March 2024 27	Mallorca	1–0	Girona	Palma
18:30 CET (UTC+1)	Copete 33'; Valjent (yellow card) 37'; Lato (yellow card) 59'; Mascarell (yellow card) 74'; Abdón (yellow card) 76'; Darder (yellow card) 90+3'	Report		Stadium: Estadi Mallorca Son Moix; Attendance: 17,769; Referee: Francisco José Hernández Maeso

8 March 2024 28	Barcelona	1–0	Mallorca	Barcelona
21:00 CET (UTC+1)	Gündoğan (penalty missed) 24'; Martínez (yellow card) 53'; Yamal 73'	Report	S. Costa (yellow card) 86'	Stadium: Estadi Olímpic Lluís Companys; Attendance: 38,225; Referee: Javier Iglesias Villanueva

16 March 2024 29	Mallorca	1–0	Granada	Palma
14:00 CET (UTC+1)	Larin (yellow card) 23'; Nastasić (yellow card) 41'; Raíllo 85'	Report		Stadium: Estadi Mallorca Son Moix; Attendance: 16,477; Referee: Ricardo de Burgos Bengoetxea

30 March 2024 30	Valencia	0–0	Mallorca	Valencia
18:30 CET (UTC+1)		Report	Larin (yellow card) 31'; S. Costa (yellow card) 90'	Stadium: Mestalla; Attendance: 42,567; Referee: Miguel Ángel Ortiz Arias

13 April 2024 31	Mallorca	0–1	Real Madrid	Palma
18:30 CEST (UTC+2)	Raíllo (yellow card) 16'; Muriqi (yellow card) 83'	Report	Tchouaméni 48'; Lunin (yellow card) 85'	Stadium: Estadi Mallorca Son Moix; Attendance: 23,224; Referee: José María Sánchez Martínez

22 April 2024 32	Sevilla	2–1	Mallorca	Seville
21:00 CEST (UTC+2)	En-Nesyri 61'; Romero 75'	Report	S. Costa (yellow card) 21'; Copete (yellow card) 73'; Abdón 90+5'	Stadium: Ramón Sánchez Pizjuán; Attendance: 35,203; Referee: Alejandro Hernández Hernández

28 April 2024 33	Cádiz	1–1	Mallorca	Cádiz
14:00 CEST (UTC+2)	Lucas Pires (yellow card) 32'; Ramos (yellow card) 41'; Mascarell 59' (o.g.); Fali (yellow card) 73'	Report	Muriqi 12'; Rodríguez (yellow card) 45+2'; Mascarell (yellow card) 53'	Stadium: Nuevo Mirandilla; Attendance: 18,174; Referee: Isidro Díaz de Mera Escuderos

4 May 2024 34	Mallorca	0–1	Atlético Madrid	Palma
21:00 CEST (UTC+2)	Raíllo (yellow card) 71'; Muriqi (yellow card) 75'	Report	Riquelme 5'	Stadium: Estadi Mallorca Son Moix; Attendance: 20,519; Referee: Javier Alberola Rojas

11 May 2024 35	Mallorca	1–0	Las Palmas	Palma
14:00 CEST (UTC+2)	González (yellow card) 14', (goal) 29'; J. Costa (yellow card) 45+1'; S. Costa (yellow card) 70'; Valjent (yellow card) 78'; Muriqi (yellow card) 80'; Copete (yellow card) 85'	Report	Araujo (yellow card) 59'; Sandro (yellow card) 90+3'	Stadium: Estadi Mallorca Son Moix; Attendance: 16,050; Referee: Juan Martínez Munuera

14 May 2024 36	Osasuna	1–1	Mallorca	Pamplona
19:30 CEST (UTC+2)	Moncayola 14'	Report	Mascarell (yellow card) 35'; Darder 65'	Stadium: El Sadar; Attendance: 17,852; Referee: Francisco José Hernández Maeso

19 May 2024 37	Mallorca	2–2	Almería	Palma
19:00 CEST (UTC+2)	Raíllo (yellow card) 18'; Larin 29'; Copete (yellow card) 37'; Darder 83'	Report	Arribas 41', (yellow card) 64'; Romero (yellow card) 45+2'; Robertone (yellow card) 62'; Langa 66'	Stadium: Estadi Mallorca Son Moix; Attendance: 20,573; Referee: Ricardo de Burgos Bengoetxea

26 May 2024 38	Getafe	1–2	Mallorca	Getafe
14:00 CEST (UTC+2)	Álvarez 48'	Report	Vidal (yellow card) 30'; Rodríguez (yellow card) 73'; Muriqi 90'; Maffeo 90+3'	Stadium: Coliseum; Attendance: 9,545; Referee: Víctor García Verdura

=== Copa del Rey ===
1 November 2023 First round	Boiro	0–4	Mallorca	Boiro
18:30 CET (UTC+1)	Carril (yellow card) 42'	Report	Abdón 25', 33' (pen.), 76' (pen.); Larin 46'	Stadium: Barraña; Attendance: 2,000; Referee: Javier Alberola Rojas

6 December 2023 Second round	Valle de Egüés	0–3	Mallorca	Aranguren
19:00 CET (UTC+1)	Iriarte (yellow card) 17'; P. López (yellow card) 79'	Report	Rodríguez (yellow card) 16', (goal) 39'; Llabrés 56', 62'	Stadium: Estadio Valle Araguren; Attendance: 1,400; Referee: Ricardo de Burgos Bengoetxea
Note: The match was played at the Estadio Valle Araguren in Aranguren, instead of Valle de Egüés' regular stadium, the Sarriguren in Valle de Egüés, which did not meet the broadcasting requirements.

7 January 2024 Round of 32	Burgos	0–3	Mallorca	Burgos
12:00 CET (UTC+1)	Sancris (yellow card) 68'	Report	Sánchez (yellow card) 58'; González 63'; Van der Heyden (yellow card) 68'; Larin 74'; Abdón 81'	Stadium: El Plantío; Attendance: 10,653; Referee: Isidro Díaz de Mera Escuderos

16 January 2024 Round of 16	Tenerife	0–1 (a.e.t.)	Mallorca	Santa Cruz de Tenerife
21:00 WET (UTC+0)	Jiménez (yellow card) 96'	Report	Amath (yellow card) 36'; Raíllo (yellow card) 72'; Mascarell (yellow card) 79'; Llabrés (yellow card) 97'; Rodríguez (yellow card) 99'; González (yellow card) 105+2'; Larin 120'	Stadium: Heliodoro Rodríguez López; Attendance: 20,176; Referee: Mario Melero López

24 January 2024 Quarter-finals	Mallorca	3–2	Girona	Palma
19:30 CET (UTC+1)	Larin 21'; Abdón 28', 35' (pen.); Rodríguez (yellow card) 37'; J. Costa (yellow card) 39'; Raíllo (red card) 67'; Greif (yellow card) 72'; S. Costa (yellow card) 90+4'; Nastasić (yellow card) 90+8'	Report	Stuani 68' (pen.); Blind (yellow card) 90+4'; Couto (yellow card) 90+4'; Sávio 90+6'	Stadium: Estadi Mallorca Son Moix; Attendance: 19,950; Referee: José Luis Munuera Montero

6 February 2024 Semi-finals; First leg	Mallorca	0–0	Real Sociedad	Palma
21:00 CET (UTC+1)	Copete (yellow card) 47'; Rodríguez (yellow card) 68'; J. Costa (yellow card) 90+7'	Report	Zubeldia (yellow card) 55'; Merino (yellow card) 81'; Silva (yellow card) 90+5'	Stadium: Estadi Mallorca Son Moix; Attendance: 22,051; Referee: Alejandro Muñiz Ruiz

27 February 2024 Semi-finals; Second leg	Real Sociedad	1–1 (a.e.t.) (1–1 agg.) (4–5 p)	Mallorca	San Sebastián
21:30 CET (UTC+1)	Méndez (penalty missed) 45+1'; Oyarzabal 71'; Le Normand (yellow card) 113'	Report	Copete (yellow card) 21'; González 50'; J. Costa (yellow card) 88'; Muriqi (yellow card) 105+4'	Stadium: Reale Arena; Attendance: 35,781; Referee: Jesús Gil Manzano
	Penalties
	Oyarzabal (penalty missed); Turrientes (penalty scored); Olasagasti (penalty scored); Zubimendi (penalty scored); Becker (penalty scored)		(penalty scored) Muriqi; (penalty scored) Morlanes; (penalty scored) Mascarell; (penalty scored) Radonjić; (penalty scored) Darder

6 April 2024 Final	Athletic Bilbao	1–1 (a.e.t.) (4–2 p)	Mallorca	Seville
22:00 CEST (UTC+2)	Paredes (yellow card) 27'; Sancet 50'	Report	Rodríguez 21'; Muriqi (yellow card) 90+1'; Radonjić (yellow card) 119'	Stadium: La Cartuja; Attendance: 57,619; Referee: José Luis Munuera Montero
	Penalties
	R. García (penalty scored); Muniain (penalty scored); Vesga (penalty scored); Berenguer (penalty scored)		(penalty scored) Muriqi; (penalty missed) Morlanes; (penalty missed) Radonjić; (penalty scored) Sánchez
