= 2017–18 Getafe CF season =

Getafe CF
2017–18 season
- President: Ángel Torres
- Head coach: José Bordalás
- Stadium: Coliseum Alfonso Pérez
- La Liga: 8th
- Copa del Rey: Round of 32
- Top goalscorer: League: Ángel (13); All: Ángel (13)
Home colours	Away colours	Third colours

During the 2017–18 season, Getafe CF participated in La Liga and the Copa del Rey.

== Squad ==
As of 13 January 2018

Note: Flags indicate national team as defined under FIFA eligibility rules; some limited exceptions apply. Players may hold more than one non-FIFA nationality.

No.	Pos.	Nation	Player
1	GK	ARG	Emiliano Martínez (on loan from Arsenal)
2	DF	TOG	Djené
3	DF	POR	Vitorino Antunes (on loan from Dynamo Kyiv)
4	DF	ESP	Bruno
5	MF	ESP	Markel Bergara (on loan from Real Sociedad)
6	DF	ARG	Cata Díaz (2nd captain)
7	MF	ESP	Álvaro Jiménez
8	MF	ALG	Mehdi Lacen (captain)
9	FW	ESP	Ángel
10	MF	JPN	Gaku Shibasaki
11	FW	ESP	Chuli
12	MF	ESP	Francisco Portillo
13	GK	ESP	Vicente Guaita

No.	Pos.	Nation	Player
14	MF	ESP	Sergio Mora
15	DF	ESP	Francisco Molinero
16	DF	ESP	Cala
17	DF	URU	Mathías Olivera
18	MF	URU	Mauro Arambarri (on loan from Boston River)
19	FW	ESP	Jorge Molina
20	MF	ESP	Dani Pacheco
21	MF	MAR	Fayçal Fajr
22	DF	URU	Damián Suárez
23	FW	SEN	Amath
24	MF	ECU	Jefferson Montero (on loan from Swansea City)
25	GK	SRB	Filip Manojlović

=== Out of the first team ===
Note: Flags indicate national team as defined under FIFA eligibility rules; some limited exceptions apply. Players may hold more than one non-FIFA nationality.

No.	Pos.	Nation	Player
—	DF	ARG	Nicolás Gorosito
—	DF	VEN	Rolf Feltscher

No.	Pos.	Nation	Player
—	MF	GER	Johannes van den Bergh
—	MF	FRA	Karim Yoda

=== Transfers ===
- List of Spanish football transfers summer 2017 § Getafe

==== In ====
Date	Player	From	Type	Fee	Ref
30 June 2017	(Venezuela) Rolf Feltscher	(Spain) Real Zaragoza	Loan return	Free	
30 June 2017	(Germany) Johannes van den Bergh	(Germany) Greuther Fürth	Loan return	Free	
30 June 2017	(France) Karim Yoda	(Spain) Almería	Loan return	Free	
1 July 2017	(Spain) Francisco Portillo	(Spain) Real Betis	Transfer	€1,500,000	
1 July 2017	(Spain) Dani Pacheco	(Spain) Real Betis	Transfer	€1,000,000	
1 July 2017	(Spain) Álvaro Jiménez	(Spain) Real Madrid B	Transfer	€1,000,000	
1 July 2017	(Spain) Chuli	(Spain) Almería	Transfer	€700,000	
5 July 2017	(Spain) Bruno	(Spain) Real Betis	Transfer	€600,000	
6 July 2017	(Spain) Ángel	(Spain) Real Zaragoza	Transfer	Free	
17 July 2017	(Japan) Gaku Shibasaki	(Spain) Tenerife	Transfer	Free	
18 July 2017	(Spain) Markel Bergara	(Spain) Real Sociedad	Loan	Free	
20 July 2017	(Morocco) Fayçal Fajr	(Spain) Deportivo La Coruña	Transfer	Free	
21 July 2017	(Serbia) Filip Manojlović	(Serbia) Red Star Belgrade	Transfer	€1,250,000	
21 July 2017	(Portugal) Vitorino Antunes	(Ukraine) Dynamo Kyiv	Loan	Free	
24 July 2017	(Togo) Djené	(Belgium) Sint-Truidense	Transfer	€2,500,000	
26 July 2017	(Uruguay) Emiliano Velázquez	(Spain) Atlético Madrid	Loan	Free	
2 August 2017	(Argentina) Emiliano Martínez	(England) Arsenal	Loan	Free	
9 August 2017	(Uruguay) Mauro Arambarri	(Uruguay) Boston River	Loan	Free	
10 August 2017	(Senegal) Amath	(Spain) Atlético Madrid	Transfer	€3,000,000	
14 August 2017	(Uruguay) Mathías Olivera	(Uruguay) Nacional	Transfer	Undisclosed	
17 August 2017	(Spain) Rubén Yáñez	(Spain) Real Madrid	Transfer	Undisclosed	

==== Out ====
Date	Player	To	Type	Fee	Ref
30 June 2017	(Argentina) Facundo Castillón	(Argentina) Racing Club	Loan return	Free	
30 June 2017	(Romania) Paul Anton	(Romania) Dinamo București	Loan return	Free	
1 July 2017	(Spain) David Fuster	Retired			
12 July 2017	(Serbia) Stefan Šćepović	(Spain) Sporting Gijón	Loan	Free	
13 July 2017	(Spain) Alberto García	(Spain) Rayo Vallecano	Loan	Free	
19 July 2017	(Spain) Carlos Peña	(Spain) Lorca	Transfer	Free	
21 July 2017	(Argentina) Alejandro Faurlín	(Mexico) Cruz Azul	Transfer	Undisclosed	
27 July 2017	(Argentina) Emi Buendía	(Spain) Cultural Leonesa	Loan	Free	
17 August 2017	(Spain) Rubén Yáñez	(Spain) Cádiz	Loan	Free	

== Pre-season and friendlies ==
Team 1	Score	Team 2
Getafe	1–1	Alcoyano
Getafe	1–3	At. Baleares
Getafe	1–0	Girona
Alcorcón	2–1	Getafe
Getafe	0–0	Atlético Madrid
Albacete	2–1	Getafe

== Competitions ==
=== Overall ===
Competition	Final position
La Liga	-
Copa del Rey	-

=== Liga ===
==== League table ====
Pos	Team	Pld	W	D	L	GF	GA	GD	Pts	Qualification or relegation
6	Real Betis	38	18	6	14	60	61	−1	60	Qualification for the Europa League group stage (Note: Since the winners of the 2017–18 Copa del Rey, Barcelona, qualified for European competition based on league position, the spot awarded to the cup winners (Europa League group stage) was passed to the sixth-placed team and the spot awarded to the sixth-placed team (Europa League second qualifying round) was passed to the seventh-placed team.)
7	Sevilla	38	17	7	14	49	58	−9	58	Qualification for the Europa League second qualifying round
8	Getafe	38	15	10	13	42	33	+9	55	
9	Eibar	38	14	9	15	44	50	−6	51 (Note: Eibar finished ahead of Girona on head-to-head points: Eibar 4–1 Girona, Girona 1–4 Eibar.)	
10	Girona	38	14	9	15	50	59	−9	51	

Source: La Liga, Soccerway
Rules for classification: 1) Points; 2) Head-to-head points; 3) Head-to-head goal difference; 4) Goal difference; 5) Goals scored; 6) Fair-play points (Note: Head-to-head record is used only after all the matches between the teams in question have been played)

==== Matches ====
Win Draw Loss Fixtures

20 August 2017 1	Athletic Bilbao	0–0	Getafe	Bilbao
18:15 CEST (UTC+02:00)	Núñez (yellow card) 68'	Report	Bergara (yellow card) 18'; Álvaro (yellow card) 41' (yellow-red card) 66'; Suárez (yellow card) 59'; Molinero (yellow card) 63'	Stadium: San Mamés; Attendance: 38,110; Referee: Mario Melero López

27 August 2017 2	Getafe	0–1	Sevilla	Getafe
20:15 CEST (UTC+02:00)		Report	Sarabia (yellow card) 75'; Ganso 83'	Stadium: Coliseum Alfonso Pérez; Attendance: 10,039; Referee: Alberto Undiano Mallenco

8 September 2017 3	Leganés	1–2	Getafe	Leganés
21:00 CEST (UTC+02:00)	Guerrero 65'; Morán (yellow card) 74'	Report	Arambarri 39'; Jiménez 83'; Amath (yellow card) 48'; Cala (yellow card) 70'	Stadium: Butarque; Attendance: 11,454; Referee: Alfonso Álvarez Izquierdo

16 September 2017 4	Getafe	1–2	Barcelona	Getafe
16:15 CEST (UTC+02:00)	Cala (yellow card) 32'; Shibasaki 39'; Da. Suárez (yellow card) 88'	Report	Piqué (yellow card) 10'; Deulofeu (yellow card) 53'; De. Suárez 62'; Alba (yellow card) 66'; L. Suárez (yellow card) 73'; Paulinho 84'	Stadium: Coliseum Alfonso Pérez; Attendance: 15,164; Referee: David Fernández Borbalán

21 September 2017 5	Celta Vigo	1–1	Getafe	Vigo
21:00 CEST (UTC+02:00)	M. Gómez 25', (yellow card) 69'; Jozabed (yellow card) 57'	Report	Djené (yellow card) 17'; Antunes (yellow card) 66'; Suárez (yellow card) 74'; Ángel 86'; Jiménez (yellow card) 90+2'	Stadium: Balaídos; Attendance: 14,700; Referee: Daniel Trujillo Suárez

24 September 2017 6	Getafe	4–0	Villarreal	Getafe
16:15 CEST (UTC+02:00)	Arambarri (yellow card) 19'; Ángel 54', 90+2'; Molina 64'; Bergara 67'	Report	Bakambu (yellow card) 42'; Trigueros (yellow card) 65'; Rodri (yellow card) 74'; Soriano (yellow card) 90+1'	Stadium: Coliseum Alfonso Pérez; Attendance: 10,874; Referee: Ignacio Iglesias Villanueva

30 September 2017 7	Deportivo La Coruña	2–1	Getafe	A Coruña
13:00 CEST (UTC+02:00)	Luisinho (yellow card) 26'; Schär (yellow card) 64'; Pérez 66'; Juanfran (yellow card) 83'; Andone 87', (yellow card) 87'; Bakkali (yellow card) 89'; Guilherme (yellow card) 90+3'	Report	Suárez (yellow card) 33'; Amath 54'; Molina (yellow card) 62'; Bergara (yellow card) 69'	Stadium: Riazor; Attendance: 19,329; Referee: Xavier Estrada Fernández

14 October 2017 8	Getafe	1–2	Real Madrid	Getafe
16:15 CEST (UTC+02:00)	Arambarri (yellow card) 34'; Molina 56'; Lacen (yellow card) 85'	Report	Benzema 39'; Kroos (yellow card) 48'; Nacho (yellow card) 58'; Ronaldo 85'; Hernandez (yellow card) 90+4'	Stadium: Coliseum Alfonso Pérez; Attendance: 15,350; Referee: Juan Martínez Munuera

22 October 2017 9	Levante	1–1	Getafe	Valencia
13:00 CEST (UTC+02:00)	Lerma (yellow card) 42'; Morales 62'	Report	Arambarri (yellow card) 5'; Cala (yellow card) 14'; Fajr 58'; Portillo (yellow card) 90'	Stadium: Ciutat de València; Attendance: 17,287; Referee: Ricardo de Burgos Bengoetxea

29 October 2017 10	Getafe	2–1	Real Sociedad	Getafe
12:00 CEST (UTC+02:00)	Djené (yellow card) 70'; Suárez (yellow card) 76'; Ángel 78'; Antunes (yellow card) 82'; Molina 85' (pen.)	Report	Oyarzabal 5'; De la Bella (yellow card) 56'; Rulli (yellow card) 84'	Stadium: Coliseum Alfonso Pérez; Attendance: 10,798; Referee: José María Sánchez Martínez

3 November 2017 11	Real Betis	2–2	Getafe	Seville
21:00 CET (UTC+01:00)	García (yellow card) 18'; Amat (yellow card) 53'; Sanbria 68'; Boudebouz 87'	Report	Cala (yellow card) 12'; Bergara 18', (yellow card) 85'; Arambarri (yellow card) 32'; Antunes (yellow card) 33'; Portillo 34'; Djené (yellow card) 43'; Fajr (yellow card) 75'	Stadium: Benito Villamarín; Attendance: 39,631; Referee: Antonio Mateu Lahoz

18 November 2017 12	Getafe	4–1	Alavés	Getafe
13:00 CET (UTC+01:00)	Bergara 6'; Molina 9' (pen.); Djené (yellow card) 18'; Antunes (yellow card) 32'; Ángel 53', 64'; Jiménez (yellow card) 90+1'	Report	Diéguez (yellow card) 9'; Alexis (yellow card) 41'; Wakaso (yellow card) 63'; Santos 81'	Stadium: Coliseum Alfonso Pérez; Attendance: 9,893; Referee: Santiago Jaime Latre

27 November 2017 13	Espanyol	1–0	Getafe	Cornellà de Llobregat
21:00 CET (UTC+01:00)	Fuego (yellow card) 45'; Gerard 55'; García (yellow card) 65'; Darder (yellow card) 90+2'	Report	Djené (yellow card) 21'; Cala (yellow card) 42'; Bergara (yellow card) 59'; Suárez (yellow card) 82'; Molina (yellow card) 89'; Antunes (yellow card) 89'	Stadium: RCDE Stadium; Attendance: 11,659; Referee: Juan Martínez Munuera

3 December 2017 14	Getafe	1–0	Valencia	Getafe
16:15 CET (UTC+01:00)	Molinero (yellow card) 13'; Arambarri (yellow card) 21' (yellow-red card) 25'; Djené (yellow card) 52'; Bergara 66'; Amath (yellow card) 71'; Ángel (yellow card) 73'; Molina (yellow card) 88'; Suárez (yellow card) 90'	Report	Kondogbia (yellow card) 23'; Parejo (yellow card) 69'; Montoya (yellow card) 83'; Mina (yellow card) 90'	Stadium: Coliseum Alfonso Pérez; Attendance: 12,213; Referee: David Medié Jiménez

9 December 2017 15	Getafe	0–0	Eibar	Getafe
13:00 CET (UTC+01:00)	Shibasaki (yellow card) 88'	Report	Inui (yellow card) 49'; García (yellow card) 81'; Alejo (yellow card) 84'; Enrich (yellow card) 90+2'	Stadium: Coliseum Alfonso Pérez; Attendance: 9,317; Referee: Javier Alberola Rojas

17 December 2017 16	Girona	1–0	Getafe	Girona
12:00 CET (UTC+01:00)	Stuani 5'; Granell (yellow card) 86'; Timor (yellow card) 90'	Report	Arambarri (yellow card) 22'; Mora (yellow card) 35'; Cala (yellow card) 51'; Antunes (yellow card) 65'; Molina (yellow card) 79'; Ángel (yellow card) 90'	Stadium: Montilivi; Attendance: 9,917; Referee: Alberto Undiano Mallenco

20 December 2017 17	Getafe	2–0	Las Palmas	Getafe
19:30 CET (UTC+01:00)	Cala 6', (yellow card) 60'; Amath 15'; Suárez (yellow card) 21'; Antunes (yellow card) 56'	Report	David Simón (yellow card) 68'	Stadium: Coliseum Alfonso Pérez; Attendance: 9,231; Referee: Ricardo de Burgos Bengoetxea

6 January 2018 18	Atlético Madrid	2–0	Getafe	Madrid
13:00 CET (UTC+01:00)	Vrsaljko (yellow card) 14'; Correa 18'; Hernandez (yellow card) 24'; Gabi (yellow card) 30'; Griezmann (yellow card) 44'; Savić (yellow card) 45'; Costa (yellow card) 62' (yellow-red card) 68', (goal) 68'	Report	Portillo (yellow card) 29'; Cala (yellow card) 45'; Dakonam (yellow card) 74'	Stadium: Wanda Metropolitano; Attendance: 47,106; Referee: José Luis Munuera Montero

12 January 2018 19	Getafe	1–0	Málaga	Getafe
21:00 CET (UTC+01:00)	Amath (yellow card) 10'; Antunes (yellow card) 14'; Cala 73'; Bruno (yellow card) 81'	Report	Recio (yellow card) 90'	Stadium: Coliseum Alfonso Pérez; Attendance: 9,288; Referee: Juan Martínez Munuera

19 January 2018 20	Getafe	2–2	Athletic Bilbao	Getafe
21:00 CET (UTC+01:00)	Molina 21' (pen.), (yellow card) 67'; Amath (yellow card) 29'; Molinero (yellow card) 47'; Ángel 74'; Dakonam (yellow card) 79'; Arambarri (yellow card) 90+2'	Report	Williams 13'; Núñez (yellow card) 44'; García 48' (pen.)	Stadium: Coliseum Alfonso Pérez; Attendance: 11,457; Referee: Jesús Gil Manzano

28 January 2018 21	Sevilla	1–1	Getafe	Seville
18:30 CET (UTC+01:00)	Muriel 72'; Mercado (yellow card) 76'; Rico (yellow card) 90+3'; Nolito (yellow card) 90+3'	Report	Cala (yellow card) 64'; Bruno (yellow card) 69'; Mora (yellow card) 74'; Ángel 90+3'	Stadium: Ramón Sánchez Pizjuán; Attendance: 34,115; Referee: Javier Alberola Rojas

4 February 2018 22	Getafe	0–0	Leganés	Getafe
12:00 CET (UTC+01:00)	Suárez (yellow card) 55'; Antunes (yellow card) 86'	Report	Zaldúa (yellow card) 13'; Omar (yellow card) 25'; Naranjo (yellow card) 46'; Mantovani (yellow card) 61'; Cuéllar (yellow card) 72'; Pérez (yellow card) 75'	Stadium: Coliseum Alfonso Pérez; Attendance: 10,657; Referee: Alfonso Álvarez Izquierdo

11 February 2018 23	Barcelona	0–0	Getafe	Barcelona
16:15 CET (UTC+01:00)	Busquets (yellow card) 54'; Mina (yellow card) 90+3'	Report	Arambarri (yellow card) 44'; Antunes (yellow card) 65'; Guaita (yellow card) 90+3'	Stadium: Camp Nou; Attendance: 74,079; Referee: David Fernández Borbalán

19 February 2018 24	Getafe	3–0	Celta Vigo	Getafe
21:00 CET (UTC+01:00)	Suárez (yellow card) 10'; Cabrera (yellow card) 23'; Ángel 37' 85'; Molina 51'; Portillo (yellow card) 60'; Fajr (yellow card) 87'	Report	Roncaglia (yellow card) 64'; Boyé (yellow card) 79'; Mor (yellow card) 81'	Stadium: Coliseum Alfonso Pérez; Attendance: 7,929; Referee: Pablo González Fuertes

25 February 2018 25	Villarreal	1–0	Getafe	Villarreal
12:00 CET (UTC+01:00)	Ünal 3' (yellow card) 50'; Ruiz (yellow card) 13'; Soriano (yellow card) 52'; Castillejo (yellow card) 53'; Costa (yellow card) 82'	Report	Molinero (yellow card) 43'; Antunes (yellow card) 75'; Fajr (yellow card) 78'	Stadium: La Cerámica; Attendance: 15,632; Referee: José María Sánchez Martínez

28 February 2018 26	Getafe	3–0	Deportivo La Coruña	Getafe
19:30 CET (UTC+01:00)	Sergio Mora (yellow card) 25'; Ángel 40'; Bóveda 44' (o.g.); Ndiaye (yellow card) 50'; Jorge Molina 82'	Report	Luisinho (yellow card) 20'; Krohn-Dehli (yellow card) 34'; Pedro Mosquera (yellow card) 57'; Bóveda (yellow card) 88'	Stadium: Coliseum Alfonso Pérez; Attendance: 5,097; Referee: (Spain) José Luis Munuera Montero

4 March 2018 27	Real Madrid	3–1	Getafe	Madrid
20:45 CET (UTC+01:00)	Bale 24'; Ronaldo 45+1', 78'	[Report]	Portillo 68'	Stadium: Santiago Bernabéu

10 March 2018 28	Getafe	0–1	Levante	Getafe
18:30 CET (UTC+01:00)	Bruno (yellow card) 33'; Amath (yellow card) 61'; Suárez (yellow card) 82'; Molina (yellow card) 88'	Summary	Campaña (yellow card) 3'; Cabaco (yellow card) 33'; López (yellow card) 34'; Ivi (yellow card) 37'; Coke (yellow card) 40', (goal) 79'; Koke Vegas (red card) 83'; Oier (yellow card) 90+2'; Bardhi (yellow card) 90+3'	Stadium: Coliseum Alfonso Pérez; Attendance: 8,006; Referee: (Spain) Daniel Trujillo

18 March 2018 29	Real Sociedad	1–2	Getafe	San Sebastián
--:-- CEST (UTC+02:00)		[Report]		Stadium: Anoeta

1 April 2018 30	Getafe	0–1	Real Betis	Getafe
--:-- CEST (UTC+02:00)		[Report]		Stadium: Coliseum Alfonso Pérez

8 April 2018 31	Alavés	2–0	Getafe	Vitoria-Gasteiz
--:-- CEST (UTC+02:00)		[Report]		Stadium: Mendizorrotza

15 April 2018 32	Getafe	1–0	Espanyol	Getafe
--:-- CEST (UTC+02:00)		[Report]		Stadium: Coliseum Alfonso Pérez

18 April 2018 33	Valencia	1–2	Getafe	Valencia
--:-- CEST (UTC+02:00)		[Report]		Stadium: Mestalla

22 April 2018 34	Eibar	0–1	Getafe	Eibar
--:-- CEST (UTC+02:00)		[Report]		Stadium: Ipurua

29 April 2018 35	Getafe	1–1	Girona	Getafe
--:-- CEST (UTC+02:00)		[Report]		Stadium: Coliseum Alfonso Pérez

6 May 2018 36	Las Palmas	0–1	Getafe	Las Palmas
--:-- CEST (UTC+02:00)		[Report]		Stadium: Gran Canaria

13 May 2018 37	Getafe	0–1	Atlético Madrid	Getafe
--:-- CEST (UTC+02:00)		[Report]		Stadium: Coliseum Alfonso Pérez

20 May 2018 38	Málaga	0–1	Getafe	Málaga
--:-- CEST (UTC+02:00)		[Report]		Stadium: La Rosaleda

=== Copa del Rey ===
==== Round of 32 ====
24 October 2017	Getafe	0–1	Alavés	Getafe
20:30	Mora (yellow card) 62'; Arambarri (yellow card) 85'; Fajr (yellow card) 90+2'	Report	Pina (yellow card) 22'; Diéguez (yellow card) 24'; Sobrino (yellow card) 37'; Duarte (yellow card) 61'; Santos 87'; Katai (yellow card) 90+1'; Sivera (yellow card) 90+2'	Stadium: Coliseum; Attendance: 7,731; Referee: David Fernández Borbalán

30 November 2017	Alavés	3–0 (4–0 agg.)	Getafe	Vitoria-Gasteiz
19:00	Munir 3', 69'; Bojan 31'	Report		Stadium: Mendizorrotza; Attendance: 9,128; Referee: José González González

== Statistics ==
=== Appearances and goals ===
Last updated on 20 May 2018.

No.	Pos	Nat	Player	Total		La Liga		Copa del Rey	
No.	Pos	Nat	Player	Apps	Goals	Apps	Goals	Apps	Goals
Goalkeepers
1	GK	(Argentina) ARG	Emiliano Martínez	7	0	5	0	2	0
13	GK	(Spain) ESP	Vicente Guaita	33	0	33	0	0	0
25	GK	(Serbia) SRB	Filip Manojlović	0	0	0	0	0	0
Defenders
2	DF	(Togo) TOG	Djené	36	1	36	1	0	0
3	DF	(Portugal) POR	Vitorino Antunes	35	0	31+3	0	1	0
4	DF	(Spain) ESP	Bruno	22	0	17+3	0	1+1	0
6	DF	(Uruguay) URU	Leandro Cabrera	9	0	8+1	0	0	0
15	DF	(Spain) ESP	Francisco Molinero	12	0	5+5	0	2	0
16	DF	(Spain) ESP	Cala	22	2	20	2	2	0
17	DF	(Uruguay) URU	Mathías Olivera	4	1	1+2	1	1	0
22	DF	(Uruguay) URU	Damián Suárez	33	1	33	1	0	0
36	DF	(Spain) ESP	Alberto Redondo	1	0	1	0	0	0
37	DF	(Spain) ESP	Miguel Ángel Rubio	1	0	0+1	0	0	0
38	DF	(Spain) ESP	David Alba	1	0	1	0	0	0
Midfielders
5	MF	(Spain) ESP	Markel Bergara	18	4	18	4	0	0
7	MF	(Spain) ESP	Álvaro Jiménez	15	1	5+8	1	2	0
8	MF	(France) FRA	Mathieu Flamini	8	0	6+2	0	0	0
10	MF	(Japan) JPN	Gaku Shibasaki	22	1	12+10	1	0	0
12	MF	(Spain) ESP	Francisco Portillo	35	2	28+5	2	2	0
14	MF	(Spain) ESP	Sergio Mora	28	0	6+20	0	2	0
18	MF	(Uruguay) URU	Mauro Arambarri	29	1	26+1	1	2	0
20	MF	(Spain) ESP	Dani Pacheco	12	0	0+11	0	0+1	0
21	MF	(Morocco) MAR	Fayçal Fajr	33	1	26+5	1	2	0
28	MF	(Spain) ESP	Barri	2	0	1+1	0	0	0
31	MF	(Republic of the Congo) CGO	Merveil Ndockyt	6	0	0+6	0	0	0
Forwards
9	FW	(Spain) ESP	Ángel	34	13	26+7	13	0+1	0
11	FW	(France) FRA	Loïc Rémy	11	3	6+5	3	0	0
19	FW	(Spain) ESP	Jorge Molina	36	7	31+5	7	0	0
23	FW	(Senegal) SEN	Amath	39	3	36+1	3	1+1	0
30	FW	(Spain) ESP	Hugo Duro	3	0	0+2	0	0+1	0
Players who have made an appearance or had a squad number this season but have left the club
6	DF	(Argentina) ARG	Nicolás Gorosito	1	0	0	0	1	0
8	MF	(Algeria) ALG	Mehdi Lacen	4	0	0+4	0	0	0
24	MF	(Ecuador) ECU	Jefferson Montero	4	0	0+4	0	0	0
26	MF	(Spain) ESP	Carlos Calderón	2	0	0+1	0	0+1	0
11	FW	(Spain) ESP	Chuli	1	0	0	0	1	0

=== Cards ===
Accounts for all competitions. Last updated on 22 December 2017.

No.	Pos.	Name	Yellow card	Red card
2	DF	(Togo) Djené	6	0
3	DF	(Portugal) Vitorino Antunes	7	0
5	MF	(Spain) Markel Bergara	4	0
6	DF	(Argentina) Nicolás Gorosito	1	0
7	MF	(Spain) Álvaro Jiménez	3	1
8	MF	(Algeria) Mehdi Lacen	1	0
9	FW	(Spain) Ángel	2	0
10	MF	(Japan) Gaku Shibasaki	1	0
12	DF	(Spain) Francisco Portillo	2	0
14	MF	(Spain) Sergio Mora	2	0
15	DF	(Spain) Francisco Molinero	2	0
16	DF	(Spain) Cala	7	0
18	MF	(Uruguay) Mauro Arambarri	7	1
19	FW	(Spain) Jorge Molina	4	0
21	MF	(Morocco) Fayçal Fajr	2	0
22	DF	(Uruguay) Damián Suárez	8	0
23	FW	(Senegal) Amath	2	0

=== Clean sheets ===
Last updated on 22 December 2017.

Number	Nation	Name	Matches Played	La Liga	Copa del Rey	Total
1	(Argentina)	Emiliano Martínez	2	0	0	0
13	(Spain)	Vicente Guaita	17	5	0	5
25	(Serbia)	Filip Manojlović	0	0	0	0
TOTALS				4	0	4
