= 2021–22 RCD Mallorca season =

RCD Mallorca
2021–22 season
- Owner: Robert Sarver
- President: Andy Kohlberg
- Head coach: Luis García (until 22 March); Javier Aguirre (from 24 March)
- Stadium: Visit Mallorca Stadium
- La Liga: 16th
- Copa del Rey: Quarter-finals
- Top goalscorer: League: Vedat Muriqi; Salva Sevilla (5 each); All: Ángel (8)
- Highest home attendance: 12,933 vs Elche (7 November 2021)
- Lowest home attendance: 7,529 vs Espanyol (27 August 2021)
- Biggest win: UD Llanera 0–6 Mallorca
- Biggest defeat: Real Madrid 6–1 Mallorca
Home colours	Away colours	Third colours

The 2021–22 season was the 88th season in the existence of RCD Mallorca and the club's first season back in the top flight of Spanish football. In addition to the domestic league, Mallorca participated in this season's editions of the Copa del Rey.

== Players ==
=== First-team squad ===
As of 3 March 2022

Note: Flags indicate national team as defined under FIFA eligibility rules; some limited exceptions apply. Players may hold more than one non-FIFA nationality.

No.	Pos.	Nation	Player
1	GK	ESP	Manolo Reina (captain)
2	DF	URU	Giovanni González
3	DF	ESP	Brian Oliván
4	MF	ESP	Iñigo Ruiz de Galarreta (vice-captain)
5	DF	ARG	Franco Russo
6	MF	FRA	Clément Grenier
7	FW	KOS	Vedat Muriqi (on loan from Lazio)
8	MF	ESP	Salva Sevilla (3rd captain)
9	FW	ESP	Abdón
10	MF	ESP	Antonio Sánchez
11	FW	USA	Matthew Hoppe
12	MF	GHA	Iddrisu Baba
13	GK	SVK	Dominik Greif
14	MF	ESP	Dani Rodríguez

No.	Pos.	Nation	Player
15	DF	ESP	Pablo Maffeo (on loan from VfB Stuttgart)
16	MF	ARG	Rodrigo Battaglia (on loan from Sporting CP)
17	MF	JPN	Takefusa Kubo (on loan from Real Madrid)
18	DF	ESP	Jaume Costa
19	MF	KOR	Lee Kang-in
20	DF	SRB	Aleksandar Sedlar
21	DF	ESP	Antonio Raíllo (4th captain)
22	FW	ESP	Ángel
23	MF	SEN	Amath Ndiaye
24	DF	SVK	Martin Valjent
25	GK	ESP	Sergio Rico (on loan from Paris Saint-Germain)
26	FW	ESP	Fer Niño (on loan from Villarreal)
31	GK	ESP	Leo Román

=== Reserve team ===
Note: Flags indicate national team as defined under FIFA eligibility rules; some limited exceptions apply. Players may hold more than one non-FIFA nationality.

No.	Pos.	Nation	Player
27	FW	ESP	Pablo Gálvez
28	DF	ESP	Marc Carmona
29	DF	ESP	Josep Gayá
30	GK	ESP	Ferran Quetglas

No.	Pos.	Nation	Player
32	MF	ARG	Thomas Giaquinto
33	GK	ESP	Pere García
34	FW	ESP	Javi Llabrés

=== Out on loan ===
Note: Flags indicate national team as defined under FIFA eligibility rules; some limited exceptions apply. Players may hold more than one non-FIFA nationality.

No.	Pos.	Nation	Player
—	DF	ARG	Braian Cufré (at Málaga until 30 June 2022)
—	DF	ESP	Joan Sastre (at PAOK until 30 June 2022)
—	MF	ESP	Aleix Febas (at Málaga until 30 June 2022)

No.	Pos.	Nation	Player
—	FW	ESP	Álex Alegría (at Burgos until 30 June 2022)
—	FW	ESP	Jordi Mboula (at Estoril until 30 June 2022)
—	FW	CIV	Lago Junior (at Huesca until 30 June 2022)

== Transfers ==
=== In ===
Date	Player	From	Type	Fee	Ref
30 June 2021	(Spain) Álex Alegría	Zaragoza	Loan return		
30 June 2021	(Spain) Josep Señé	Castellón	Loan return		
30 June 2021	(Spain) Stoichkov	Sabadell	Loan return		
30 June 2021	(Spain) Pablo Valcarce	Ponferradina	Loan return		
30 June 2021	(Serbia) Igor Zlatanović	Castellón	Loan return		
30 June 2021	(Senegal) Amath Ndiaye	Getafe	Transfer	Undisclosed	
6 July 2021	(Slovenia) Dominik Greif	(Slovenia) Slovan Bratislava	Transfer	Undisclosed	
7 July 2021	(Spain) Jaume Costa	Villarreal	Transfer	Free	
7 July 2021	(Spain) Pablo Maffeo	(Germany) Suttgart	Loan		
12 August 2021	(Japan) Takefusa Kubo	Real Madrid	Loan		
12 August 2021	(Argentina) Rodrigo Battaglia	(Portugal) Sporting CP	Loan		
18 August 2021	(Spain) Fer Niño	Villarreal	Loan		
30 August 2021	(South Korea) Lee Kang-in	Valencia	Transfer	Free	
31 August 2021	(United States) Matthew Hoppe	(Germany) Schalke 04	Transfer	Undisclosed	

=== Out ===
Date	Player	To	Type	Fee	Ref
30 June 2021	(Spain) Marc Cardona	Osasuna	Loan return		
30 June 2021	(Spain) Álvaro Giménez	Cádiz	Loan return		
30 June 2021	(Spain) Víctor Mollejo	Atlético Madrid	Loan return		
30 June 2021	(Brazil) Murilo	(Portugal) Braga	Loan return		
30 June 2021	(Senegal) Amath Ndiaye	Getafe	Loan return		
30 June 2021	(Spain) Koke Vegas	Levante	Loan return		
1 July 2021	(Croatia) Ante Budimir	Osasuna	Buyout clause	€8M	
1 July 2021	(Spain) Miquel Parera	Racing Santander	Transfer	Free	
21 July 2021	(Spain) Stoichkov	Eibar	Transfer	Undisclosed	
29 July 2021	(Serbia) Igor Zlatanović	(Israel) Maccabi Netanya	Transfer	Undisclosed	
1 August 2021	(Spain) Pablo Valcarce	Burgos	Transfer	Free	
3 August 2021	(Spain) Josep Señé	Lugo	Transfer	Free	

== Pre-season and friendlies ==
Win Draw Loss

21 July 2021 Friendly	Mallorca	1–0	Cartagena	La Nucia, Spain
20:00 CEST (UTC+2)	Sevilla 17'	Report		Stadium: Estadi Olímpic Camilo Cano

24 July 2021 Friendly	Ibiza	1–2	Mallorca	La Nucia, Spain
20:00 CEST (UTC+2)	Rodado 27'	Report	Mboula 53'; Junior 61'	Stadium: Estadi Olímpic Camilo Cano

27 July 2021 Friendly	Mallorca	Cancelled	Beşiktaş	La Nucia, Spain
19:00 CEST (UTC+2)				Stadium: Estadi Olímpic Camilo Cano

27 July 2021 Friendly	Mallorca	1–0	Eibar	La Nucia, Spain
21:00 CEST (UTC+2)	Ángel 52'	Report		Stadium: Estadi Olímpic Camilo Cano

1 August 2021 Friendly	Brest	1–2	Mallorca	Brest, France
19:30 CEST (UTC+2)	Faivre 63'	Report	Sevilla 11' (pen.); Mollejo 71'	Stadium: Stade Francis-Le Blé

4 August 2021 Friendly	Huesca	1–0	Mallorca	Spain
20:00 CEST (UTC+2)	Seoane 21' (pen.)

7 August 2021 Trofeu Ciutat de Palma	Mallorca	1–0	Cagliari	Palma, Spain
20:30 CEST (UTC+2)	Rodríguez 40'			Stadium: Iberostar Estadi; Attendance: 5,000; Referee: Adrián Cordero Vega

== Competitions ==
=== Overall record ===
Competition	First match	Last match	Starting round	Final position	Record							
Competition	First match	Last match	Starting round	Final position	Pld	W	D	L	GF	GA	GD	Win %
La Liga	14 August 2021	22 May 2022	Matchday 1	16th	38	10	9	19	36	63	−27	26.32
Copa del Rey	1 December 2021	2 February 2022	First round	Quarter-finals	5	4	0	1	12	3	+9	80.00
Total					43	14	9	20	48	66	−18	32.56

Source: Soccerway

=== La Liga ===
==== League table ====
Pos	Team	Pld	W	D	L	GF	GA	GD	Pts	Qualification or relegation
14	Espanyol	38	10	12	16	40	53	−13	42 (Note: Head-to-head points: Rayo Vallecano 9, Elche 7, Espanyol 1.)	
15	Getafe	38	8	15	15	33	41	−8	39 (Note: Head-to-head points: Getafe 8, Mallorca 5, Cádiz 2.)	
16	Mallorca	38	10	9	19	36	63	−27	39	
17	Cádiz	38	8	15	15	35	51	−16	39	
18	Granada (R)	38	8	14	16	44	61	−17	38	Relegation to Segunda División

Source: LaLiga Santander
Rules for classification: 1) Points; 2) Head-to-head points; 3) Head-to-head goal difference; 4) Goal difference; 5) Goals scored; 6) Fair-play points (Note: Head-to-head record is used only after all the matches between the teams in question have been played)
(R) Relegated

==== Results summary ====
Overall								Home						Away					
Pld	W	D	L	GF	GA	GD	Pts	W	D	L	GF	GA	GD	W	D	L	GF	GA	GD
38	10	9	19	36	63	−27	39	7	6	6	20	25	−5	3	3	13	16	38	−22

Source: La Liga

==== Results by round ====
Round	1	2	3	4	5	6	7	8	9	10	11	12	13	14	15	16	17	18	19	20	21	22	23	24	25	26	27	28	29	30	31	32	33	34	35	36	37	38
Ground	H	A	H	A	H	A	H	H	A	A	H	A	H	A	H	A	H	A	H	A	H	A	H	H	A	H	A	H	A	A	H	A	H	A	H	A	H	A
Result	D	W	W	L	D	L	L	W	L	D	D	D	D	L	D	W	D	L	L	L	L	L	W	W	L	L	L	L	L	L	W	L	W	L	L	D	W	W
Position	9	5	6	9	9	11	12	12	13	12	12	12	13	13	14	12	14	15	15	15	17	17	17	15	16	16	16	16	18	18	17	18	16	16	18	18	17	16

Source: La Liga
A = Away; H = Home; W = Win; D = Draw; L = Loss

==== Matches ====
The league fixtures were announced on 30 June 2021.

14 August 2021 1	Mallorca	1–1	Real Betis	Palma
19:30 CEST (UTC+2)	Oliván 25'; Febas (yellow card) 79'	Report	González (yellow card) 45+3'; Juanmi 59', (yellow card) 79'; Akouokou (yellow card) 74'	Stadium: Visit Mallorca Stadium; Attendance: 6,279; Referee: Antonio Mateu Lahoz

21 August 2021 2	Alavés	0–1	Mallorca	Vitoria-Gasteiz
17:00 CEST (UTC+2)	Lejeune (yellow card) 38'; Duarte (yellow card) 45+2' (yellow-red card) 66'	Report	Maffeo (yellow card) 60'; Amath (yellow card) 72'; Niño 80'; Rodríguez (yellow card) 90+5'	Stadium: Mendizorrotza; Attendance: 2,896; Referee: Alejandro Muñiz Ruiz

27 August 2021 3	Mallorca	1–0	Espanyol	Palma
20:00 CEST (UTC+2)	Niño (yellow card) 19'; Rodríguez 27'; Kubo (yellow card) 37'; Oliván (yellow card) 70'; Sedlar (yellow card) 80'	Report	Cabrera (yellow card) 31'; Morlanes (yellow card) 56'; Gómez (red card) 90+4'; Vadillo (yellow card) 90+8'	Stadium: Visit Mallorca Stadium; Attendance: 7,529; Referee: Isidro Díaz de Mera Escuderos

11 September 2021 4	Athletic Bilbao	2–0	Mallorca	Bilbao
21:00 CEST (UTC+2)	D. García (yellow card) 60'; Vivian 68'; I. Williams 74'	Report	Baba (yellow card) 65'; Sedlar (yellow card) 87'	Stadium: San Mamés; Attendance: 14,566; Referee: Jorge Figueroa Vázquez

19 September 2021 5	Mallorca	0–0	Villarreal	Palma
14:00 CEST (UTC+2)	Sastre (yellow card) 41'; Amath (yellow card) 53'	Report	Dia (yellow card) 54'; Pino (yellow card) 59'; Albiol (yellow card) 84'	Stadium: Visit Mallorca Stadium; Attendance: 9,168; Referee: Carlos del Cerro Grande

22 September 2021 6	Real Madrid	6–1	Mallorca	Madrid
22:00 CEST (UTC+2)	Benzema 3', 78'; Asensio 24', 29', 55'; Rodrygo (yellow card) 47'; Nacho (yellow card) 67'; Isco 84'	Report	Lee 25'; Baba (yellow card) 57'	Stadium: Santiago Bernabéu; Attendance: 20,113; Referee: Javier Alberola Rojas

26 September 2021 7	Mallorca	2–3	Osasuna	Palma
14:00 CEST (UTC+2)	Rodríguez 11'; Niño (yellow card) 20', (goal) 45+4'; Ruiz de Galarreta (yellow card) 90+6'	Report	José Ángel 9'; Aridane (yellow card) 15'; Pérez 58'; Oier (yellow card) 75'; Martínez 88'; U. García (yellow card) 90+2'	Stadium: Visit Mallorca Stadium; Attendance: 9,359; Referee: Miguel Ángel Ortiz Arias

2 October 2021 8	Mallorca	1–0	Levante	Palma
16:15 CEST (UTC+2)	Baba (yellow card) 41', (goal) 74'; Costa (yellow card) 65'; Mboula (yellow card) 84'; Amath (yellow card) 90+5'	Report	Roger (yellow card) 40'; Melero (yellow card) 45+1'; Morales (penalty missed) 85'; Pier (yellow card) 86'; Pepelu (yellow card) 88'	Stadium: Visit Mallorca Stadium; Attendance: 11,803; Referee: Alejandro Muñiz Ruiz

16 October 2021 9	Real Sociedad	1–0	Mallorca	San Sebastián
21:00 CEST (UTC+2)	Muñoz (yellow card) 14' (yellow-red card) 45+1'; Portu (yellow card) 45+3'; Lobete 90'	Report	Battaglia (yellow card) 42'; Ángel (yellow card) 45+3'; Rodríguez (yellow card) 85'	Stadium: Anoeta; Attendance: 30,831; Referee: Pablo González Fuertes

23 October 2021 10	Valencia	2–2	Mallorca	Valencia
14:00 CEST (UTC+2)	Diakhaby (yellow card) 14'; Gómez (yellow card) 34'; Wass (yellow card) 52'; Guedes 90+3'; Vallejo (yellow card) 90+4'; Gayà 90+8'	Report	Lee (yellow card) 31' (yellow-red card) 55'; Ángel 32'; Diakhaby 38' (o.g.); Abdón (yellow card) 55'; Oliván (yellow card) 77'; Battaglia (yellow card) 90'	Stadium: Mestalla; Attendance: 29,139; Referee: Carlos del Cerro Grande

27 October 2021 11	Mallorca	1–1	Sevilla	Palma
19:00 CEST (UTC+2)	Sánchez 22', (yellow card) 49'; Oliván (yellow card) 83'; Costa (red card) 90+2'; Reina (yellow card) 90+6'; Russo (yellow card) 90+6'	Report	Acuña (yellow card) 41'; Torres (yellow card) 51'; Lamela 73', (yellow card) 74'; Delaney (yellow card) 90+3'	Stadium: Visit Mallorca Stadium; Attendance: 15,125; Referee: Santiago Jaime Latre

31 October 2021 12	Cádiz	1–1	Mallorca	Cádiz
14:00 CET (UTC+1)	Fali (yellow card) 20'; Cala (yellow card) 77'; Alarcón (yellow card) 90+1'; Negredo 90+3' (pen.)	Report	Amath (yellow card) 18'; Baba 29', (yellow card) 74'; Rodríguez (yellow card) 31'; Sedlar (yellow card) 51' (yellow-red card) 87'; Lee (yellow card) 90+1'; Reina (yellow card) 90+2'	Stadium: Nuevo Mirandilla; Attendance: 11,790; Referee: Valentín Pizarro Gómez

7 November 2021 13	Mallorca	2–2	Elche	Palma
18:30 CET (UTC+1)	Russo (yellow card) 17'; Baba (yellow card) 59'; Sevilla 72' (pen.); Maffeo 90+5'	Report	Boyé (yellow card) 33', (goal) 68', 75'; Barragán (yellow card) 38'; Bigas (yellow card) 88'	Stadium: Visit Mallorca Stadium; Attendance: 12,933; Referee: Mario Melero López

22 November 2021 14	Rayo Vallecano	3–1	Mallorca	Madrid
21:00 CET (UTC+1)	Guardiola 16', (yellow card) 57'; Á. García 20'; Valentín (yellow card) 48'; Trejo 63' (pen.), (yellow card) 65'	Report	Lee (yellow card) 28'; Oliván (yellow card) 57'; Abdón 89'	Stadium: Campo de Fútbol de Vallecas; Attendance: 6,708; Referee: Jorge Figueroa Vázquez

27 November 2021 15	Mallorca	0–0	Getafe	Palma
18:30 CET (UTC+1)	Mboula (yellow card) 60'; Russo (yellow card) 67'; Abdón (yellow card) 90+3'	Report		Stadium: Visit Mallorca Stadium; Attendance: 8,635; Referee: Santiago Jaime Latre

4 December 2021 16	Atlético Madrid	1–2	Mallorca	Madrid
18:30 CET (UTC+1)	Cunha 68'; Felipe (yellow card) 79'; Lodi (yellow card) 84'	Report	Ruiz de Galarreta (yellow card) 14'; Maffeo (yellow card) 43'; Baba (yellow card) 66'; Russo 80'; Valjent (yellow card) 84'; Reina (yellow card) 89'; Kubo 90+1'	Stadium: Wanda Metropolitano; Attendance: 51,009; Referee: Juan Martínez Munuera

10 December 2021 17	Mallorca	0–0	Celta Vigo	Palma
21:00 CET (UTC+1)	Costa (yellow card) 42'; Rodríguez (yellow card) 80'; Ruiz de Galarreta (yellow card) 82'	Report	Kevin (yellow card) 45+6'; Suárez (yellow card) 90'	Stadium: Visit Mallorca Stadium; Attendance: 10,655; Referee: Isidro Díaz de Mera Escuderos

19 December 2021 18	Granada	4–1	Mallorca	Granada
14:00 CET (UTC+1)	Milla (yellow card) 19'; Molina 20', 61', 90+1'; Gonalons (yellow card) 22'; Quini (yellow card) 50'; Puertas 90+6'	Report	Rodríguez 24'; Sedlar (yellow card) 47'; Baba (yellow card) 77'	Stadium: Nuevo Los Cármenes; Attendance: 13,014; Referee: Alejandro Muñiz Ruiz

2 January 2022 19	Mallorca	0–1	Barcelona	Palma
21:00 CET (UTC+1)	Costa (yellow card) 83'; Abdón (yellow card) 89'; Rodríguez (yellow card) 90+4'; Maffeo (yellow card) 90+5'; Valjent (yellow card) 90+6'	Report	L. de Jong 44'; Jutglà (yellow card) 79'; Lenglet (yellow card) 90+4'	Stadium: Visit Mallorca Stadium; Attendance: 14,654; Referee: Antonio Mateu Lahoz

8 January 2022 20	Levante	2–0	Mallorca	Valencia
14:00 CET (UTC+1)	Soldado 47'; Pepelu (yellow card) 67'; Miramón (yellow card) 68'; Morales 90+7'	Report	Maffeo (yellow card) 2'; Oliván (penalty missed) 68'	Stadium: Ciutat de València; Attendance: 13,330; Referee: Jorge Figueroa Vázquez

22 January 2022 22	Villarreal	3–0	Mallorca	Villarreal
16:15 CET (UTC+1)	Russo 12' (o.g.); Trigueros 34'; Mario Gaspar (yellow card) 36'; Parejo 87' (pen.)	Report	Russo (yellow card) 80' (yellow-red card) 86'	Stadium: Estadio de la Cerámica; Attendance: 13,207; Referee: Miguel Ángel Ortiz Arias

5 February 2022 23	Mallorca	2–1	Cádiz	Palma
16:15 CET (UTC+1)	Sevilla 20' (pen.); Muriqi 66' (pen.); Ruiz de Galarreta (yellow card) 69'; Amath (yellow card) 77'	Report	Alcaraz 8'; Carcelén (yellow card) 59'; Ledesma (yellow card) 64'; Pérez (yellow card) 65'; Chust (yellow card) 84'	Stadium: Visit Mallorca Stadium; Attendance: 13,226; Referee: Carlos del Cerro Grande

14 February 2022 24	Mallorca	3–2	Athletic Bilbao	Palma
21:00 CET (UTC+1)	Oliván (yellow card) 12'; Sevilla 22' (pen.); Ángel 30', (yellow card) 73'; Reina (yellow card) 75'; Raíllo (yellow card) 80'; Simón 88' (o.g.); Kubo (yellow card) 88'; Muriqi (yellow card) 89'	Report	Zarraga (yellow card) 52'; Muniain (yellow card) 57'; R. García 59'; Berenguer 61', (yellow card) 90+2'; Berchiche (yellow card) 79'	Stadium: Visit Mallorca Stadium; Attendance: 12,904; Referee: Isidro Díaz de Mera Escuderos

20 February 2022 25	Real Betis	2–1	Mallorca	Seville
18:30 CET (UTC+1)	Moreno 25'; Ruiz (yellow card) 45'; Juanmi (yellow card) 46'; Willian José 83' (pen.); Bellerín (yellow card) 87'	Report	Muriqi (yellow card) 52', (goal) 75'; Battaglia (yellow card) 82'	Stadium: Benito Villamarín; Attendance: 48,652; Referee: César Soto Grado

26 February 2022 26	Mallorca	0–1	Valencia	Palma
14:00 CET (UTC+1)	Kubo (yellow card) 16'; Valjent (yellow card) 71'; Costa (yellow card) 84'; Raíllo (yellow card) 90+2'	Report	Gabriel 4'; Gil (yellow card) 19'; Alderete (yellow card) 23'; Diakhaby (yellow card) 26'; Mamardashvili (yellow card) 42'; Moriba (yellow card) 88' (yellow-red card) 90+2'	Stadium: Visit Mallorca Stadium; Attendance: 14,417; Referee: Jorge Figueroa Vázquez

2 March 2022 21	Mallorca	0–2	Real Sociedad	Palma
21:00 CET (UTC+1)		Report	Silva 35'; Merino (yellow card) 52', (goal) 62'; Remiro (yellow card) 76'	Stadium: Visit Mallorca Stadium; Attendance: 11,150; Referee: Mario Melero López

6 March 2022 27	Celta Vigo	4–3	Mallorca	Vigo
18:30 CET (UTC+1)	Beltrán (yellow card) 6'; Galhardo 13'; Suárez 25'; Aspas 61', 90+7' (pen.); Tapia (yellow card) 71'; Mallo (yellow card) 78' (yellow-red card) 86'; Méndez (yellow card) 82'	Report	González 17'; Aidoo 49' (o.g.); Muriqi (yellow card) 66'; Raíllo (yellow card) 80'; Sevilla 87' (pen.); Battaglia (yellow card) 90+3'; Ángel (yellow card) 90+4'; Reina (red card) 90+6'	Stadium: Balaídos; Attendance: 11,320; Referee: Miguel Ángel Ortiz Arias

14 March 2022 28	Mallorca	0–3	Real Madrid	Palma
21:00 CET (UTC+1)	Ángel (yellow card) 30'; Raíllo (yellow card) 69'; Maffeo (yellow card) 76'	Report	Valverde (yellow card) 17'; Vinícius (yellow card) 30', (goal) 55'; Vázquez (yellow card) 52'; Benzema 77' (pen.), 82'	Stadium: Visit Mallorca Stadium; Attendance: 17,191; Referee: José María Sánchez Martínez

20 March 2022 29	Espanyol	1–0	Mallorca	Cornellà de Llobregat
14:00 CET (UTC+1)	Bare (yellow card) 23'; De Tomás 42'; Morlanes (yellow card) 81'; Vidal (yellow card) 81'	Report	Costa (yellow card) 9'; Muriqi (yellow card) 37'; Raíllo (yellow card) 62'	Stadium: RCDE Stadium; Attendance: 17,578; Referee: Alejandro Muñiz Ruiz

2 April 2022 30	Getafe	1–0	Mallorca	Getafe
14:00 CEST (UTC+2)	Suárez (yellow card) 19'; Ünal (yellow card) 40', (penalty missed) 65'; Sandro (yellow card) 40'; Arambarri (yellow card) 45'; Mayoral 82', (yellow card) 82'	Report	Rodríguez (yellow card) 29'; González (yellow card) 41'; Russo (yellow card) 41' (yellow-red card) 63'; Sevilla (yellow card) 41'; Maffeo (yellow card) 89'	Stadium: Coliseum Alfonso Pérez; Attendance: 8,946; Referee: Antonio Mateu Lahoz

9 April 2022 31	Mallorca	1–0	Atlético Madrid	Palma
16:15 CEST (UTC+2)	Rodríguez (yellow card) 44'; Muriqi 68' (pen.)	Report	Vrsaljko (yellow card) 63'; Mandava (yellow card) 66'; Savić (yellow card) 80'; Kondogbia (yellow card) 84'	Stadium: Visit Mallorca Stadium; Attendance: 15,437; Referee: Juan Martínez Munuera

16 April 2022 32	Elche	3–0	Mallorca	Elche
14:00 CEST (UTC+2)	Mojica 42'; Bigas 58', (yellow card) 60'; Lee 81' (o.g.); Mascarell (yellow card) 86'	Report	Oliván (yellow card) 45+2'; Baba (yellow card) 53'; Sánchez (yellow card) 64'	Stadium: Estadio Manuel Martínez Valero; Attendance: 20,257; Referee: José María Sánchez Martínez

19 April 2022 33	Mallorca	2–1	Alavés	Palma
19:00 CEST (UTC+2)	Abdón 11'; Baba (yellow card) 24'; Muriqi 45+4', (yellow card) 83'	Report	García (yellow card) 35'; Escalante (yellow card) 45+2'; Méndez (yellow card) 57'; Raíllo 73' (o.g.); Loum (yellow card) 73'; Guidetti (yellow card) 90+6'; Laguardia (yellow card) 90+7'	Stadium: Visit Mallorca Stadium; Attendance: 15,264; Referee: César Soto Grado

1 May 2022 34	Barcelona	2–1	Mallorca	Barcelona
21:00 CEST (UTC+2)	Depay 25'; Gavi (yellow card) 35'; Busquets 54'; Alba (yellow card) 90+1'	Report	Raíllo (yellow card) 63', (goal) 79'; Grenier (yellow card) 64'; Maffeo (yellow card) 90+1'	Stadium: Camp Nou; Attendance: 62,789; Referee: Pablo González Fuertes

7 May 2022 35	Mallorca	2–6	Granada	Palma
14:00 CEST (UTC+2)	Sevilla 28'; Raíllo (yellow card) 45+1', (goal) 58'; Maffeo (yellow card) 45+4'; Valjent (yellow card) 67'	Report	Suárez 6'; Escudero 46'; Puertas 55'; Duarte (yellow card) 60'; Molina 69', 90'; Uzuni 78'; Petrović (yellow card) 83'	Stadium: Visit Mallorca Stadium; Attendance: 18,466; Referee: Ricardo de Burgos Bengoetxea

11 May 2022 36	Sevilla	0–0	Mallorca	Seville
20:30 CEST (UTC+2)	Acuña (yellow card) 41'; Jordán (yellow card) 49'; Lamela (yellow card) 60'; Gudelj (yellow card) 75'	Report	Oliván (yellow card) 53'; Raíllo (yellow card) 71'; Sevilla (yellow card) 72'; Sánchez (yellow card) 72'; Kubo (yellow card) 78'; Maffeo (yellow card) 89'	Stadium: Ramón Sánchez Pizjuán; Attendance: 33,242; Referee: Alejandro Hernández Hernández

15 May 2022 37	Mallorca	2–1	Rayo Vallecano	Palma
19:30 CEST (UTC+2)	Muriqi 13', (yellow card) 45'; Abdón 90+2'	Report	Ciss 60'	Stadium: Visit Mallorca Stadium; Attendance: 17,930; Referee: José Luis Munuera Montero

22 May 2022 38	Osasuna	0–2	Mallorca	Pamplona
20:00 CEST (UTC+2)	Brašanac (yellow card) 62'; U. García (yellow card) 85'	Report	Ángel 47'; Grenier 83'; Reina (yellow card) 89'; Maffeo (yellow card) 90'	Stadium: El Sadar; Attendance: 18,717; Referee: César Soto Grado

=== Copa del Rey ===
1 December 2021 First round	Gimnástica Segoviana	0–2 (a.e.t.)	Mallorca	Segovia
19:00 CET (UTC+1)		Report	Ángel 94', 105+3'	Stadium: La Albuera; Attendance: 1,914; Referee: Javier Alberola Rojas

16 December 2021 Second round	Llanera	0–6	Mallorca	Langreo (Note: Llanera played its game at Ganzábal, in Langreo instead of their regular stadium Pepe Quimarán in Posada de Llanera as it does not meet the requirements established by the Royal Spanish Football Federation.)
19:00 CET (UTC+1)		Report	Sedlar 50', 62'; Mboula 55'; Gayá 74'; Llabrés 78'; Ángel 87'	Stadium: Ganzábal; Referee: Ricardo de Burgos Bengoetxea

5 January 2022 Round of 32	Eibar	1–2	Mallorca	Eibar
16:00 CET (UTC+1)	Glauder (yellow card) 36'; Blanco (yellow card) 40', (goal) 45'; Muñoz (yellow card) 76'	Report	Sastre (yellow card) 62'; Gayà 69'; Ángel 82'	Stadium: Ipurua; Referee: Miguel Ángel Ortiz Arias

15 January 2022 Round of 16	Mallorca	2–1	Espanyol	Palma
16:00 CET (UTC+1)	Costa (yellow card) 9'; Kubo 32'; Abdón 60'; Ruiz de Galarreta (yellow card) 75'; Battaglia (yellow card) 81'	Report	Pedrosa (yellow card) 17' (yellow-red card) 90+6'; Gómez (yellow card) 31'; Puado 62', (yellow card) 70'; Vidal (yellow card) 80'	Stadium: Visit Mallorca Stadium; Referee: Santiago Jaime Latre

2 February 2022 Quarter-finals	Rayo Vallecano	1–0	Mallorca	Madrid
20:00 CET (UTC+1)	Comesaña (yellow card) 28'; Trejo 44' (pen.), (yellow card) 78'; Valentín (yellow card) 72'; Ciss (yellow card) 90+7'; Dimitrievski (yellow card) 90+8'; Balliu (yellow card) 90+9'	Report	Ruiz de Galarreta (yellow card) 33'; Sánchez (yellow card) 51'; Russo (yellow card) 84'; Maffeo (yellow card) 90+1'; Valjent (yellow card) 90+1'	Stadium: Campo de Fútbol de Vallecas; Referee: César Soto Grado

== Statistics ==
=== Goalscorers ===
Position	Players	LaLiga	Copa del Rey	Total
FW	(Spain) Ángel	4	4	8
FW	(Kosovo) Vedat Muriqi	5	0	5
MF	(Spain) Salva Sevilla	5	0	5
FW	(Spain) Abdón	3	1	4
MF	(Spain) Dani Rodríguez	3	0	3
DF	(Spain) Josep Gayá	0	2	2
MF	(Japan) Takefusa Kubo	1	1	2
FW	(Spain) Fer Niño	2	0	2
DF	(Spain) Antonio Raíllo	2	0	2
DF	(Serbia) Aleksandar Sedlar	0	2	2
MF	(Ghana) Iddrisu Baba	1	0	1
DF	(Spain) Giovanni González	1	0	1
MF	(France) Clément Grenier	1	0	1
FW	(Spain) Javier Llabrés	0	1	1
MF	(South Korea) Lee Kang-in	1	0	1
DF	(Spain) Brian Oliván	1	0	1
DF	(Spain) Pablo Maffeo	1	0	1
FW	(Spain) Jordi Mboula	0	1	1
DF	(Argentina) Franco Russo	1	0	1
MF	(Spain) Antonio Sánchez	1	0	1
