= Marcos Fernández =

Marcos Fernández may refer to:

- Marcos Fernández (footballer, born 1993), Argentine football midfielder
- Marcos Fernández (footballer, born May 2003), Spanish football forward
- Marcos Fernández (footballer, born July 2003), Spanish football left-back
