= 2016–17 CD Tenerife season =

CD Tenerife
2016–17 season
- Chairman: Miguel Concepción
- Manager: José Luis Martí
- Stadium: Heliodoro Rodríguez López
- Segunda División: 4th
- Play-offs: Runners-up
- Copa del Rey: Third round
- Top goalscorer: League: Amath (12 goals); All: Amath (13 goals)
Home colours

The 2016–17 season was the 105th season in CD Tenerife's history.

== Squad ==
Note: Flags indicate national team as defined under FIFA eligibility rules; some limited exceptions apply. Players may hold more than one non-FIFA nationality.

No.	Pos.	Nation	Player
1	GK	(Spain) ESP	Ismael Falcón
2	DF	(Spain) ESP	Edu Oriol
3	DF	(Spain) ESP	Germán Sánchez
4	DF	(France) FRA	Samuel Camille
5	DF	(Spain) ESP	Alberto Jiménez
6	MF	(Spain) ESP	Vitolo (2nd captain)
7	MF	(Spain) ESP	Omar Perdomo
8	MF	(Algeria) ALG	Rachid Aït-Atmane (on loan from Sporting Gijón)
9	FW	(Honduras) HON	Anthony Lozano (on loan from Olimpia)
10	MF	(Spain) ESP	Suso (Captain)
11	DF	(Spain) ESP	Iñaki Sáenz
14	DF	(Spain) ESP	Carlos Ruiz
16	MF	(Spain) ESP	Aitor Sanz (3rd captain)

No.	Pos.	Nation	Player
17	MF	(Spain) ESP	Aarón
18	FW	(Tunisia) TUN	Haythem Jouini (on loan from Espérance)
20	MF	(Japan) JPN	Gaku Shibasaki
21	DF	(Spain) ESP	Jorge Sáenz
22	FW	(Spain) ESP	Tyronne (on loan from Las Palmas)
23	DF	(Spain) ESP	Raúl Cámara (4th captain)
25	GK	(Venezuela) VEN	Dani Hernández
26	FW	(Spain) ESP	Cristo González
31	MF	(Senegal) SEN	Amath Ndiaye (on loan from Atlético Madrid)
32	FW	(Spain) ESP	Giovanni
34	MF	(Spain) ESP	Roberto Bolaños
35	DF	(Spain) ESP	Nahuel

== Competitions ==
=== Overall ===
Competition	Final position
Segunda División	4th
Copa del Rey	Third round

=== Liga ===
==== League table ====
Pos	Team	Pld	W	D	L	GF	GA	GD	Pts	Promotion, qualification or relegation
2	Girona (P)	42	20	10	12	65	45	+20	70	Promotion to La Liga
3	Getafe (O, P)	42	18	14	10	55	43	+12	68	Qualification to promotion play-offs
4	Tenerife	42	16	18	8	50	37	+13	66	Qualification to promotion play-offs
5	Cádiz	42	16	16	10	55	40	+15	64	Qualification to promotion play-offs
6	Huesca	42	16	15	11	53	43	+10	63 (Note: Huesca finished ahead of Valladolid on head-to-head points: Valladolid 1–2 Huesca, Huesca 1–0 Valladolid)	Qualification to promotion play-offs

Source: La Liga
Rules for classification: 1) points; 2) head-to-head points; 3) head-to-head goal difference; 4) goal difference; 5) number of goals scored
(O) Play-off winners; (P) Promoted

=== Copa del Rey ===
6 September 2016 Second round	Lugo	1–2	Tenerife	Lugo
20:00	Iriome 22'	Report	Germán 39'; Cristo González 60'	Stadium: Anxo Carro; Attendance: 2,500; Referee: Areces Franco

12 October 2016 Third round	Valladolid	3–1 (a.e.t.)	Tenerife	Valladolid
21:00	Dražić 79', 120'; de Tomás 98'	Report	Amath 84'	Stadium: José Zorrilla; Attendance: 4,210; Referee: Pérez Montero
