= 2024–25 Burgos CF season =

Burgos CF
2024–25 season
- Head coach: Bolo (until 28 October); Luis Miguel Ramis (from 31 October)
- Stadium: Estadio El Plantío
- Segunda División: 12th
- Copa del Rey: Second round
- Top goalscorer: League: Curro Sánchez (6); All: Curro Sánchez (6)
Away colours	Third colours

The 2024–25 season was the 40th season in the history of the Burgos CF, and the club's fourth consecutive season in Segunda División. In addition to the domestic league, the team participated in the Copa del Rey.

== Transfers ==
=== In ===
Pos.	Player	Transferred from	Fee	Date	Source
MF	(Portugal) Florian Miguel	(Belgium) OH Leuven	Free	17 July 2024	
MF	(Spain) Iñigo Córdoba	(Netherlands) Fortuna Sittard	Free	27 July 2024	

=== Out ===
Pos.	Player	Transferred to	Fee	Date	Source
MF	(Spain) Javi López-Pinto	(Spain) Ibiza	Contract terminated	3 January 2024	
GK	(France) Loïc Badiashile		Contract terminated	8 January 2024	

== Friendlies ==
=== Pre-season ===
20 July 2024 Friendly	Burgos	2–1	Athletic Bilbao	Burgos
19:00	Berchiche 1' (o.g.); Miguel 51'	Report	Martón 53'	Stadium: Municipal El Plantío; Attendance: 8,000; Referee: Adrián Cordero Vega

27 July 2024 Copa Amistad	Valladolid	1–1 (5–3 p)	Burgos	Palencia
20:00	Pérez 44'		Sancris 51'	Stadium: Estadio La Nueva Balastera; Attendance: 1,500

31 July 2024 Friendly	Tarazona	1–2	Burgos
19:30

3 August 2024 Friendly	Burgos	0–2	Mallorca
11:00

== Competitions ==
=== Overall record ===
Competition	First match	Last match	Starting round	Final position	Record							
Competition	First match	Last match	Starting round	Final position	Pld	W	D	L	GF	GA	GD	Win %
Segunda División	18 August 2024	31 May 2025	Matchday 1	12th	42	15	10	17	41	48	−7	35.71
Copa del Rey	30 October 2024	5 December 2024	First Round	Second Round	2	1	0	1	5	3	+2	50.00
Total					44	16	10	18	46	51	−5	36.36

Last updated: 24 August 2025
Source: Soccerway

=== Segunda División ===
==== League table ====
Pos	Team	Pld	W	D	L	GF	GA	GD	Pts
10	Albacete	42	15	13	14	57	57	0	58 (Note: Eibar finished ahead of Albacete on head-to-head points: Albacete 0–1 Eibar, Eibar 1–1 Albacete.)
11	Sporting Gijón	42	14	14	14	57	54	+3	56
12	Burgos	42	15	10	17	41	48	−7	55 (Note: Burgos finished ahead of Cádiz and Córdoba on head-to-head points: Burgos 6 pts, Cádiz 5 pts, Córdoba 4 pts.)
13	Cádiz	42	14	13	15	55	53	+2	55
14	Córdoba	42	14	13	15	59	63	−4	55

Source: LaLiga Hypermotion
Rules for classification: 1) Points; 2) Head-to-head points; 3) Head-to-head goal difference; 4) Goal difference; 5) Goals scored; 6) Fair-play points
(Note: Head-to-head record is used only after all the matches between the teams in question have been played)

==== Results summary ====
Overall								Home						Away					
Pld	W	D	L	GF	GA	GD	Pts	W	D	L	GF	GA	GD	W	D	L	GF	GA	GD
42	15	10	17	41	48	−7	55	10	4	7	26	23	+3	5	6	10	15	25	−10

Last updated: 24 August 2025.

==== Results by round ====
Round	1	2	3	4	5	6	7	8	9	10	11	12	13	14	15	16	17	18	19	20	21	22	23	24	25	26	27	28	29	30	31	32	33	34	35	36	37	38	39	40	41	42
Ground	H	A	H	A	H	A	H	A	H	A	H	A	A	H	A	H	A	H	H	A	H	A	H	A	H	A	H	A	A	H	A	H	A	H	A	H	A	H	H	A	H	A
Result	W	D	L	W	W	W	D	L	L	L	D	L	L	L	L	W	L	W	D	D	W	D	L	L	W	W	L	L	W	W	W	W	D	W	D	D	L	L	W	L	L	D
Position																																										

Updated to match(es) played on 7 September 2024. Source:
A = Away; H = Home; W = Win; D = Draw; L = Loss

==== Matches ====
The match schedule was released on 26 June 2024.

26 August 2024 2	Córdoba	2–2	Burgos	Córdoba
21:30				Stadium: Estadio Nuevo Arcángel

1 September 2024 3	Burgos	0–2	Castellón	Burgos
17:00				Stadium: Estadio El Plantío

7 September 2024 4	Huesca	0–1	Burgos	Huesca
18:30				Stadium: Estadio El Alcoraz

15 September 2024 5	Burgos	1–0	Zaragoza	Burgos
18:30				Stadium: Estadio El Plantío

21 September 2024 6	Deportivo La Coruña	0–2	Burgos	A Coruña
18:30				Stadium: Estadio Riazor

29 September 2024 7	Burgos	2–2	Granada	Burgos
16:15	López 72'; Sánchez 77'		Tsitaishvili 51'; Trigueros 73'	Stadium: Estadio El Plantío

5 October 2024 8	Almería	2–0	Burgos	Almería
18:30 CET	Suárez 29' (yellow card) 53'; Arribas (red card) 38'; Nico Melamed (yellow card) 51'; Alejandro Pozo 89'	Report	González (yellow card) 56'; Córdoba (yellow card) 57'	Stadium: UD Almería Stadium; Attendance: 10,391; Referee: (Spain) Andrés Fuentes Molina

13 October 2024 9	Burgos	0–1	Mirandés	Burgos
18:30 CET	Fer Niño (yellow card) 36'; Miguel Atienza (yellow card) 50'; Dani Ojeda (yellow card) 66'; Iñigo Córdoba (yellow card) 86'; Edu Espiau (yellow card) 90+4'	Report	Hugo Rincón (yellow card) 31' (goal) 81'; Raúl Fernández (yellow card) 90+8'; Víctor Parada (yellow card) 90+10'	Stadium: Estadio El Plantío; Attendance: 11,300; Referee: (Spain) Daniel Palencia Caballero

21 October 2024 10	Albacete	2–0	Burgos	Albacete
20:30 CET	Higinio Marín 26' (pen.); Fidel 32'	Report	David López (yellow card) 25'	Stadium: Estadio Carlos Belmonte; Attendance: 9,041; Referee: (Spain) Carlos Muñiz Muñoz

24 October 2024 11	Burgos	1–1	Racing de Ferrol	Burgos
21:00 CET	Borja Sánchez 30'	Report	Rober Correa (yellow card) 28'; Naldo (yellow card) 39'; Aitor Gelardo 45+1'	Stadium: Estadio El Plantío; Attendance: 8,053; Referee: (Spain) José Luis Guzmán Mansilla

27 October 2024 12	Elche	1–0	Burgos	Elche
16:15 CET	Rodri Mendoza 25' (yellow card) 78'; Barzic (yellow card) 87'	Report	Miguel Atienza (yellow card) 50'; Iván Morante (yellow card) 80'	Stadium: Estadio Martínez Valero; Attendance: 9,708; Referee: (Spain) Miguel Sesma Espinosa

=== Copa del Rey ===
30 October 2024 First Round	Móstoles	2-5	Burgos	Móstoles
19:30	Navarro (yellow card) 24'; García 25'; López 70'	Report	Rodríguez (yellow card) 21'; González 32'; Arroyo 34'; Sancris 50'; Niño 51'; Morante (yellow card) 59'; Miguel 66'	Stadium: Estadio El Soto; Attendance: 2,000; Referee: (Spain) Sergiu Claudiu Muresan

5 December 2024 Second Round	Marbella	1-0	Burgos	Marbella
20:00	Callejón (yellow card) 32'; Alayeto (yellow card) 41'; Carrasco (yellow card) 44'; Puñal (yellow card) 54'; Álvarez 90+3'		Espiau (yellow card) 32'; Córdoba (yellow card) 47'	Stadium: Dama de Noche; Attendance: 900; Referee: (Spain) Manuel Ángel Pérez Hernández
