= Iván Morante =

Spanish footballer (born 2001)

Personal information
- Full name: Iván Morante Ruiz
- Date of birth: 15 January 2001 (age 25)
- Place of birth: León, Spain
- Height: 1.83 m (6 ft 0 in)
- Position: Midfielder

Team information
- Current team: Girona
- Number: 14

Youth career
- 2006–2013: Ejido
- 2013–2020: Villarreal
- 2020: Real Madrid

Senior career*
Years	Team	Apps	(Gls)
2019–2020	Villarreal B	4	(0)
2020–2022	Real Madrid B	36	(1)
2022–2024	Ibiza	32	(1)
2023–2024	→ Racing Santander (loan)	34	(2)
2024–2026	Burgos	75	(2)
2026–	Girona	8	(0)

International career
2017–2018	Spain U17	8	(0)
2018–2019	Spain U18	11	(1)
2019–2020	Spain U19	7	(0)
2019	Spain U20	5	(0)
- * Club domestic league appearances and goals as of 24 October 2026

Iván Morante Ruiz (born 15 January 2001) is a Spanish professional footballer who plays as a midfielder for Girona FC.

== Club career ==
Born in León, Castile and León, Morante joined Villarreal CF's youth setup in 2013, from hometown side CD Ejido. He made his senior debut with the reserves on 14 September 2019, coming on as a late substitute for Sergio Lozano in a 3–0 Segunda División B away win over UE Llagostera.

On 30 January 2020, Morante moved to Real Madrid, being initially assigned to the Juvenil A squad. He was promoted to Castilla ahead of the 2020–21 season, and scored his first senior goal on 11 December 2021, netting the opener in a 1–1 Primera División RFEF away draw against Sevilla Atlético.

On 19 July 2022, Morante signed a two-year deal with Segunda División side UD Ibiza. He made his professional debut on 14 August, starting in a 2–0 home loss against Granada CF.

Morante scored his first professional goal on 25 March 2023, netting the opener in a 2–0 home win over Burgos CF. On 19 July, after Ibiza's relegation, he moved to fellow second division side Racing de Santander on a one-year loan deal.

On 31 July 2024, free agent Morante signed a two-year contract with Burgos still in division two. On 9 July 2026, he agreed to a three-year deal with fellow league team Girona FC.

== career statistics ==
As of match played 27 October 2026

Appearances and goals by club, season and competition
Club	Season	League			Cup		Europe		Other		Total	
Club	Season	Division	Apps	Goals	Apps	Goals	Apps	Goals	Apps	Goals	Apps	Goals
Villarreal B	2019–20	Segunda División B	4	0	—		—		2 (Note: Appearances in Premier League Cup)	0	6	0
Real Madrid B	2020–21	Segunda División B	13	0	—		—		2 (Note: Appearances in Segunda División B play-offs)	0	15	0
Real Madrid B	2021–22	Primera Federación	23	1	—		—		0	0	23	1
Real Madrid B	Total		36	1	—		—		2	0	38	1
Ibiza	2022–23	Segunda División	32	1	2	0	—		—		34	1
Racing Santander (loan)	2023–24	Segunda División	34	2	1	0	—		—		35	2
Burgos	2024–25	Segunda División	34	0	2	0	—		—		36	0
Burgos	2025–26	Segunda División	41	2	2	0	—		—		43	2
Burgos	Total		75	2	4	0	—		—		79	2
Girona	2026–27	Segunda División	8	0	1	0	—		—		9	0
Career total			189	6	8	0	0	0	4	0	201	6

== Honours ==
Individual

- UEFA European Under-17 Championship Team of the Tournament: 2018
