= Carlos Calderón (Spanish footballer) =

Spanish footballer

Personal information
- Full name: Carlos Calderón López
- Date of birth: 14 April 1995 (age 31)
- Place of birth: Almansa, Spain
- Height: 1.82 m (6 ft 0 in)
- Position: Winger

Team information
- Current team: Ponferradina
- Number: 7

Youth career
- Levante

Senior career*
Years	Team	Apps	(Gls)
2014–2015	Levante B	14	(0)
2015–2016	Mallorca B	31	(3)
2016–2018	Getafe B	69	(26)
2017	Getafe	1	(0)
2018–2019	Lugo	0	(0)
2018–2019	→ Internacional Madrid (loan)	26	(1)
2020	Tudelano	5	(1)
2020–2022	Logroñés	58	(7)
2022–2023	Badajoz	35	(2)
2023–2025	Cultural Leonesa	59	(1)
2025–2026	Cartagena	17	(0)
2026–	Ponferradina	17	(0)
- * Club domestic league appearances and goals as of 25 May 2026

Carlos Calderón López (born 14 April 1995) is a Spanish footballer who plays as a winger for Primera Federación club Ponferradina.

== Club career ==
Born in Almansa, Albacete, Castile-La Mancha, Calderón was a Levante UD youth graduate. He made his senior debut with the reserves on 27 April 2014, coming on as a second-half substitute for Álvaro Traver in a 0–1 away loss against CF Reus Deportiu in the Segunda División B championship.

On 20 July 2015 Calderón moved to another reserve team, signing a one-year deal with RCD Mallorca B in Tercera División. He scored his first senior goal the following 21 February, netting the last in a 2–0 away win against CF Sant Rafael.

On 29 July 2016 Calderón joined Getafe CF, being initially assigned to the B-team also in the fourth level. After scoring 13 goals for the side, he signed a new two-year contract.

On 21 October 2017 Calderón made his first team – and La Liga – debut, coming on as a late substitute for Amath Ndiaye in a 1–1 away draw against Levante UD. The following 10 July, he signed a three-year deal with Segunda División side CD Lugo, but was loaned to Internacional de Madrid on 31 August.

On 2 September 2019, Calderón terminated his contract with the Galicians, and signed for third division side CD Tudelano the following 31 January. He continued to feature in the third division in the following years, representing SD Logroñés, CD Badajoz, Cultural y Deportiva Leonesa, Cartagena and Ponferradina.
