= Javier Llabrés =

Spanish footballer

Javi Llabrés
Personal information
- Full name: Javier Llabrés Expósito
- Date of birth: 11 September 2002 (age 24)
- Place of birth: Inca, Spain
- Height: 1.74 m (5 ft 9 in)
- Position: Winger

Team information
- Current team: Burgos

Youth career
- Mallorca

Senior career*
Years	Team	Apps	(Gls)
2020–2022	Mallorca B	34	(8)
2021–2026	Mallorca	39	(1)
2023	→ Mirandés (loan)	14	(1)
2025	→ Eldense (loan)	15	(3)
2026–	Burgos	0	(0)
- * Club domestic league appearances and goals as of 1 May 2026

Javier "Javi" Llabrés Expósito (born 11 September 2002) is a Spanish professional footballer who plays mainly as a left winger for Burgos CF.

== Career ==
Born in Inca, Mallorca, Balearic Islands, Llabrés was a RCD Mallorca youth graduate. In March 2019, while still a youth, he signed a five-year contract with the club.

Llabrés made his senior debut with the reserves on 29 November 2020, coming on as a second-half substitute in a 0–0 Tercera División home draw against CF Sant Rafel. He scored his first goal on 19 December, netting the B's second in a 6–0 home routing of Club Santa Catalina Atlético, and became a regular starter for the B-team afterwards.

Llabrés made his first-team debut for the Bermellones on 1 December 2021, starting in a 2–0 away win over Gimnástica Segoviana CF in the season's Copa del Rey. He scored his first goal for the side on 16 December, netting his team's fifth in a 6–0 thrashing of UD Llanera also in the national cup.

Llabrés made his professional – and La Liga – debut on 2 January 2022, replacing Lee Kang-in in a 1–0 home loss to FC Barcelona. Three days later, he provided two assists in a 2–1 win at SD Eibar which qualified Mallorca for the round of 16 of the Copa del Rey.

On 18 January 2023, after just 16 minutes of action during the first half of the season, Llabrés was loaned to Segunda División side CD Mirandés until June. He scored his first professional goal on 17 April, netting the winner in a 2–1 away success over Levante UD.

Llabrés returned to the Bermellones in July 2023, and became a permanent first team member after being assigned the number 19 jersey. On 17 January 2025, he moved to CD Eldense in the second division on loan until the end of the season.

Upon returning, Llabrés was again a backup option as Mallorca suffered relegation, and moved to division two side Burgos CF on a three-year deal on 4 July 2026.

== Career statistics ==
As of match played 1 May 2026

Appearances and goals by club, season and competition
Club	Season	League			Cup		Other		Total	
Club	Season	Division	Apps	Goals	Apps	Goals	Apps	Goals	Apps	Goals
Mallorca B	2019–20	Segunda División B	—		—		1 (Note: Appearance in Segunda División B play-offs)	0	1	0
Mallorca B	2020–21	Tercera División	19	4	—		3 (Note: Appearances in 2021 Tercera División play-offs)	1	22	5
Mallorca B	2021–22	Tercera Federación	15	4	—		—		15	4
Mallorca B	Total		34	8	—		4	1	38	9
Mallorca	2021–22	La Liga	5	0	3	1	—		8	1
Mallorca	2022–23	La Liga	1	0	0	0	—		1	0
Mallorca	2023–24	La Liga	16	1	4	2	—		20	3
Mallorca	2024–25	La Liga	1	0	0	0	—		1	0
Mallorca	2025–26	La Liga	16	0	2	0	—		18	0
Mallorca	Total		39	1	9	3	—		48	4
Mirandés (loan)	2022–23	Segunda División	14	1	—		—		14	1
Eldense (loan)	2024–25	Segunda División	15	3	—		—		15	3
Career total			102	13	9	3	4	1	115	17
