= Nahuel Omiliani =

Spanish footballer

Personal information
- Full name: Nahuel Alberto Omiliani González
- Date of birth: 1 April 1996 (age 30)
- Place of birth: Santa Cruz de Tenerife, Spain
- Height: 1.72 m (5 ft 7 1/2 in)
- Position: Left-back

Youth career
- Tenerife

Senior career*
Years	Team	Apps	(Gls)
2015–2018	Tenerife B	84	(0)
2017–2020	Tenerife	1	(0)
2018–2019	→ Murcia (loan)	16	(0)
2020–2021	Güímar	6	(0)
2021	Ejea	17	(1)
2021–2022	Ebro	33	(2)
2022–2023	Zamora	16	(0)
- * Club domestic league appearances and goals as of 20:40, 25 October 2023 (UTC)

Nahuel Alberto Omiliani González (born 1 April 1996) is a Spanish footballer who plays as a left-back.

== Club career ==
Nahuel was born in Santa Cruz de Tenerife, Canary Islands to an Argentine father, and was a CD Tenerife youth graduate. He made his debut as a senior with the reserves on 3 January 2015, starting in a 1–0 Tercera División away win against UD Villa de Santa Brígida.

On 10 June 2017 Nahuel made his first team debut, coming on as a second-half substitute for Raúl Cámara in a 2–1 away win against Real Zaragoza in the Segunda División. On 30 August of the following year, he was loaned to Segunda División B side Real Murcia for one year.
