= Marcos Fernández (footballer, born July 2003) =

Spanish footballer (born 2003)

Personal information
- Full name: Marcos Fernández Cózar
- Date of birth: 17 July 2003 (age 23)
- Place of birth: Andratx, Spain
- Height: 1.76 m (5 ft 9 in)
- Position: Left-back

Team information
- Current team: Numancia
- Number: 3

Youth career
- Mallorca

Senior career*
Years	Team	Apps	(Gls)
2021–2024	Mallorca B	54	(1)
2024	Mallorca	0	(0)
2024	Gil Vicente	0	(0)
2025–2026	Espanyol B	24	(0)
2026	Arenas Club	12	(1)
2026–	Numancia	4	(0)
- * Club domestic league appearances and goals as of 27 September 2026

Marcos Fernández Cózar (born 17 July 2003) is a Spanish professional footballer who plays as a left-back for Segunda Federación club Numancia.

== Career ==
Fernández was born in Andratx, Mallorca, Balearic Islands, and was a RCD Mallorca youth graduate. He made his senior debut with the reserves on 23 December 2021, coming on as a second-half substitute for David López in a 3–0 Tercera División RFEF home win over Inter Ibiza CD.

Fernández scored his first senior goal on 17 September 2023, netting the B's opener in a 3–0 home win over CF Sóller. He made his first team debut on 7 January of the following year, replacing Siebe Van der Heyden late into a 3–0 away win over Burgos CF, for the season's Copa del Rey.

On 27 June 2024, Fernández moved abroad for the first time in his career, signing a two-year contract with Portuguese Primeira Liga side Gil Vicente FC.
