= Alberto Redondo =

Spanish footballer

Personal information
- Full name: Alberto Redondo Guijarro
- Date of birth: 22 May 1997 (age 29)
- Place of birth: Cuenca, Spain
- Position: Left back

Youth career
- Getafe

Senior career*
Years	Team	Apps	(Gls)
2015–2019	Getafe B	73	(1)
2018–2019	Getafe	1	(0)
2020	Mallorca B	6	(0)
2020–2021	Elche B	21	(0)
2022–2024	Tarancón	74	(2)
- * Club domestic league appearances and goals as of 10 May 2024

Alberto Redondo Guijarro (born 22 May 1997) is a Spanish footballer who plays as a right back.

== Club career ==
Born in Cuenca, Castile-La Mancha, Redondo finished his formation with Getafe CF. On 1 November 2015 he his senior debut with the reserves, starting in a 2–0 Segunda División B home win against Real Madrid Castilla.

Redondo appeared in two further matches during the campaign, as his side suffered relegation. He scored his first senior goal on 5 February 2017, netting the opener in a 4–0 home routing of SR Villaverde-Boetticher CF.

Redondo made his first team – and La Liga – debut on 6 May 2018, starting in a 1–0 away win against UD Las Palmas. However, he resumed his spell with the B-team before leaving in 2019.

In January 2020, Redondo moved to another reserve team, RCD Mallorca B also in the fourth division.
