= Sergio Mora (footballer, born 1979) =

Spanish footballer

Personal information
- Full name: Sergio Mora Sánchez
- Date of birth: 30 August 1979 (age 47)
- Place of birth: Torrejón de Ardoz, Spain
- Height: 1.82 m (6 ft 0 in)
- Position: Midfielder

Youth career
- Rayo Vallecano

Senior career*
Years	Team	Apps	(Gls)
1999–2002	Rayo Vallecano B		
2000–2001	→ Gandía (loan)	20	(3)
2001–2002	→ Getafe (loan)	26	(5)
2002–2003	Rayo Vallecano	21	(0)
2003–2006	Hércules	70	(1)
2006–2007	Benidorm	30	(1)
2007–2009	Alcoyano	68	(7)
2009–2015	Alcorcón	166	(12)
2015–2016	Alavés	39	(3)
2016	UCAM Murcia	8	(0)
2017–2018	Getafe	47	(0)
Total		495	(32)

Managerial career
- 2019–2021: Getafe (assistant)
- 2021–2022: Hércules
- * Club domestic league appearances and goals

Sergio Mora Sánchez (born 30 August 1979) is a Spanish former professional footballer who played as a midfielder, currently a manager.

He amassed Segunda División totals of 223 matches and 11 goals over eight seasons, representing Hércules, Alcorcón, Alavés, UCAM Murcia and Getafe. In La Liga, he totalled 47 appearances for the latter club and Rayo Vallecano.

== Playing career ==
Mora was born in Torrejón de Ardoz, Madrid. A product of hometown club Rayo Vallecano's youth ranks, he appeared in 21 games for its first team during 2002–03's La Liga, in an eventual relegation. His debut in the competition came on 6 October 2002, in a 2–2 home draw against Villarreal CF.

Subsequently, competing mainly in the Segunda División B, Mora went on to represent CF Gandía, Getafe CF (both on loan), Hércules CF, Benidorm CF, CD Alcoyano and AD Alcorcón, helping the latter promote to Segunda División for the first time ever in 2010. He scored his first professional goal on 11 September of that year, the last in a 4–1 away loss to UD Las Palmas. He was a regular at the Estadio Municipal de Santo Domingo the following five seasons, only appearing in less than 20 matches in 2014–15.

On 4 July 2015, at the age of 35, Mora signed with fellow second-division team Deportivo Alavés. He was an undisputed starter during his tenure, as they returned to the top flight after ten years.

Mora joined UCAM Murcia CF also in the second tier on 13 July 2016, after agreeing to a one-year contract. On 22 December, he moved to Getafe of the same league.

On 20 August 2017, after having taken the field in a 0–0 away draw against Athletic Bilbao, Mora became the first player of Geta to appear in all three divisions for the club. One year later, he announced his retirement.

== Coaching career ==
Mora was appointed assistant manager to José Bordalás at Getafe in the summer of 2019. On 8 July 2021, he returned to Hércules as head coach.

== Managerial statistics ==
As of match played 21 May 2022

Managerial record by team and tenure
Team	Nat	From	To	Record								Ref
Team	Nat	From	To	G	W	D	L	GF	GA	GD	Win %	Ref
Hércules	(Spain)	8 July 2021	22 May 2022	36	15	12	9	42	33	+9	41.67	
Total				36	15	12	9	42	33	+9	41.67	—

== Honours ==
Alavés

- Segunda División: 2015–16
