= Ferrán Quetglas =

Spanish footballer (born 2005)

Personal information
- Full name: Ferran Quetglás Lorente
- Date of birth: June 6, 2005 (age 21)
- Place of birth: Palma de Mallorca, Spain
- Height: 1.88 m (6 ft 2 in)
- Position: Goalkeeper

Team information
- Current team: Real Madrid B
- Number: 25

Youth career
- 2013–2022: Mallorca
- 2022–2024: Real Madrid

Senior career*
Years	Team	Apps	(Gls)
2024–2026	Real Madrid C	25	(0)
2026–	Real Madrid B	0	(0)

International career^{‡}
2020	Spain U15	1	(0)
2021–2022	Spain U17	6	(0)
2022	Spain U18	1	(0)
2022	Spain U19	1	(0)
- * Club domestic league appearances and goals as of 7 May 2026 ‡ National team caps and goals as of 25 October 2022

Ferrán Quetglas Llorente (born 6 June 2005) is a Spanish footballer who plays as a goalkeeper for Real Madrid Castilla.

== Early life ==
Quetglas was born on 6 June 2005 in Palma de Mallorca, Spain. The younger brother of Spanish footballer Toni Quetglas, he started playing football at the age of six.

== Club career ==
As a youth player, Quetglas joined the youth academy of Mallorca. In 2020, he joined the youth academy of CD San Francisco, before returning to Mallorca one year later. Subsequently, he joined the youth academy of La Liga side Real Madrid in 2022. Two years later, he was promoted to the club's C team.

== International career ==
Quetglas has represented Spain internationally at youth level. While playing for the Spain national under-17 football team, he played for them for 2022 UEFA European Under-17 Championship qualification and the 2022 UEFA European Under-17 Championship.

== Style of play ==
Quetglas plays as a goalkeeper and is right-footed. News website Goal wrote in 2022 that he is a "modern goalkeeper who is very agile and powerful between the posts and, in addition, with great play with his feet. His output both short and long are a very useful added value in today's football". The same year, Spanish newspaper Marca compared him to Spain international Iker Casillas.
