= David López (footballer, born 2003) =

Spanish footballer

Personal information
- Full name: David López Guijarro
- Date of birth: 3 February 2003 (age 23)
- Place of birth: Palma, Spain
- Height: 1.95 m (6 ft 5 in)
- Position: Centre-back

Team information
- Current team: Mallorca
- Number: 27

Youth career
- Mallorca

Senior career*
Years	Team	Apps	(Gls)
2021–2024	Mallorca B	70	(2)
2023–	Mallorca	15	(0)
2024	→ Elche (loan)	2	(0)
2024–2025	→ Burgos (loan)	17	(1)
- * Club domestic league appearances and goals as of 17 May 2026

David López Guijarro (born 3 February 2003) is a Spanish professional footballer who plays as a centre-back for RCD Mallorca.

== Career ==
Born in Palma de Mallorca, Balearic Islands, López was a RCD Mallorca youth graduate. He made his senior debut with the reserves on 11 September 2021, coming on as a late substitute in a 2–1 Tercera División RFEF away win over UD Collerense.

López scored his first senior goal on 30 March 2022, netting the B's third in a 4–0 home routing of CF Sóller. He made his first team debut on 1 November 2023, replacing Toni Lato in a 4–0 away routing of CD Boiro, for the season's Copa del Rey.

López made his professional debut on 7 January 2024, starting in a 3–0 away win over Burgos CF, also for the national cup. On 1 February, he was loaned to Segunda División side Elche CF for the remainder of the season.

On 6 August 2024, López moved to fellow second division side Burgos on a one-year loan deal. He scored his first professional goal on 8 December, netting the winner in a 1–0 home success over CD Eldense.

On 30 January 2025, López was recalled by Mallorca.

== Career statistics ==
As of match played 17 May 2026

Appearances and goals by club, season and competition
Club	Season	League			National cup		Other		Total	
Club	Season	Division	Apps	Goals	Apps	Goals	Apps	Goals	Apps	Goals
Mallorca B	2022–23	Segunda Federación	32	0	—		—		32	0
Mallorca	2023–24	La Liga	0	0	4	0	—		4	0
Mallorca	2024–25	La Liga	2	0	—		—		2	0
Mallorca	2025–26	La Liga	13	0	3	0	—		16	0
Mallorca	Total		15	0	3	0	—		18	0
Elche (loan)	2023–24	Segunda División	2	0	—		—		2	0
Burgos (loan)	2024–25	Segunda División	17	1	2	0	—		19	1
Career total			66	1	9	0	0	0	75	1
