= Josep Gayá =

Spanish footballer(born 7 July 2000)

Personal information
- Full name: Josep Antoni Gayá Martínez
- Date of birth: 7 July 2000 (age 26)
- Place of birth: Palma, Spain
- Height: 1.85 m (6 ft 1 in)
- Position: Centre-back

Team information
- Current team: Lugo
- Number: 24

Youth career
- –2016: Manacor
- 2016–2019: Mallorca

Senior career*
Years	Team	Apps	(Gls)
2019–2023	Mallorca B	84	(4)
2021–2024	Mallorca	3	(0)
2023–2024	→ Amorebieta (loan)	21	(1)
2024–2025	Tenerife	12	(0)
2025	Zimbru Chișinău	14	(1)
2025–	Lugo	22	(1)
- * Club domestic league appearances and goals as of 9 June 2026

Josep Antoni Gayá Martínez (born 7 July 2000) is a Spanish professional footballer who plays as a central defender for Primera Federación club Lugo.

== Career ==
Born in Palma de Mallorca, Balearic Islands, Gayá joined RCD Mallorca's youth setup in June 2016, from CD Manacor. He made his senior debut with the reserves on 1 May 2019, coming on as a second-half substitute in a 6–0 Tercera División away routing of CF Sóller.

Gayá scored his first senior goal on 13 December 2020, netting the equalizer for the B's in a 1–1 draw at SD Formentera. He made his first team – and La Liga – debut the following 22 September, starting in a 1–6 away loss against Real Madrid.

On 1 September 2023, Gayá was loaned to Segunda División side SD Amorebieta for the season. He scored his first professional goal on 11 November, netting the equalizer in a 1–1 away draw against Sporting de Gijón.

On 29 June 2024, after suffered relegation with Amore, Gayá terminated his contract with the Bermellones. On 22 July, he signed a one-year deal with CD Tenerife also in the second division.

On 3 February 2025, Gayá terminated his link with Tete by mutual consent.
