= Amath Ndiaye =

Senegalese footballer (born 1996)

Personal information
- Full name: Amath Ndiaye Diedhiou
- Date of birth: 16 July 1996 (age 30)
- Place of birth: Pikine, Senegal
- Height: 1.73 m (5 ft 8 in)
- Positions: Left winger; forward

Team information
- Current team: Lusail
- Number: 21

Youth career
- 2010–2014: Valladolid
- 2012–2014: → Parquesol (loan)
- 2014–2015: Atlético Madrid

Senior career*
Years	Team	Apps	(Gls)
2015–2016	Atlético Madrid B	32	(10)
2016–2017	Atlético Madrid	0	(0)
2016–2017	→ Tenerife (loan)	35	(12)
2017–2021	Getafe	59	(4)
2020–2021	→ Mallorca (loan)	31	(9)
2021–2024	Mallorca	62	(2)
2024	→ Valladolid (loan)	9	(5)
2024–2026	Valladolid	32	(4)
2026–	Lusail	1	(0)

International career^{‡}
2018	Senegal	4	(0)
- * Club domestic league appearances and goals as of 24 October 2026 ‡ National team caps and goals as of 23 November 2019

Amath Ndiaye Diedhiou (born 16 July 1996), known as Amath Ndiaye or simply Amath, is a Senegalese professional footballer who plays as a left winger or forward for Qatari club Lusail SC.

== Club career ==
Born in Pikine, Amath joined Atlético Madrid's youth setup in 2014, from Real Valladolid. He made his senior debut with the former's reserves on 5 September 2015, coming on as a substitute in a 0–0 Tercera División home draw against CDE Lugo Fuenlabrada.

On 15 November 2015, Amath scored his first senior goals, netting a double in a 3–0 home win against CD Móstoles URJC. The following 6 January, he scored a hat-trick in a 4–1 away routing at AD Parla.

On 28 August 2016, Amath was loaned to Segunda División club CD Tenerife, for one year. He made his professional debut on 3 September, replacing Álex García in a 3–1 away loss against Elche CF.

Amath scored his first professional goal on 12 October 2016, netting his team's only in a 3–1 Copa del Rey away loss against Real Valladolid. Late in the month, he scored a brace in a 3–2 home win against Rayo Vallecano.

Amath finished the season with 12 goals, being a key unit as the Canarians missed out promotion in the play-offs. On 10 August 2017, he was signed a five-year contract with La Liga side Getafe CF, who bought 50% of his federative rights.

Amath made his debut in the top division of Spanish football on 20 August 2017, starting in a 0–0 away draw against Athletic Bilbao. He scored his first goal in the category on 30 September, netting the first in a 2–1 loss at Deportivo de La Coruña.

In December 2018, Amath was ruled out for the remainder of the season after suffering a knee injury in a match against CD Leganés. On 5 October 2020, after featuring rarely, he was loaned to second division side RCD Mallorca for the 2020–21 campaign.

Amath helped the Bermellones to return to the top tier at first attempt by netting nine goals in 31 appearances, and signed a permanent four-year deal with the club on 30 June 2021. On 1 February 2024, he returned to his first club Valladolid on loan for the remainder of the 2023–24 season.

On 31 May 2024, Valladolid exercised Amath's buyout clause, and he signed a permanent deal until 2027 with the club. On 20 August 2026, he moved to Lusail SC of the Qatar Stars League.

== Career statistics ==
=== Club ===
As of match played 27 August 2021

Appearances and goals by club, season and competition
Club	Season	League			National cup		Other		Total	
Club	Season	Division	Apps	Goals	Apps	Goals	Apps	Goals	Apps	Goals
Atlético Madrid B	2015–16	Tercera División	32	10	—		2	0	34	10
Tenerife (loan)	2016–17	Segunda División	35	12	1	0	4 (Note: Appearance(s) in Promotion Playoffs)	0	40	12
Getafe	2017–18	La Liga	37	3	0	0	—		37	3
Getafe	2018–19	La Liga	15	1	0	0	—		15	1
Getafe	2019–20	La Liga	7	0	0	0	—		7	0
Getafe	Total		59	4	0	0	0	0	59	4
Mallorca (loan)	2020–21	Segunda División	31	9	0	0	—		31	9
Mallorca	2021–22	La Liga	2	0	0	0	—		2	0
Real Valladolid	2025–26	Segunda División	1	2	0	0	—		1	2
Career total			160	37	1	0	6	0	167	37

=== International ===
As of match played 17 November 2018

Appearances and goals by national team and year
National team	Year	Apps	Goals
Senegal	2018	4	0
Total		4	0
