= 2022–23 CA Osasuna season =

CA Osasuna
2022–23 season
- President: Luis Sabalza
- Head coach: Jagoba Arrasate
- Stadium: El Sadar
- La Liga: 7th
- Copa del Rey: Runners-up
- Top goalscorer: League: Chimy Ávila; Ante Budimir (8 each); All: Chimy Ávila (9)
Home colours	Away colours	Third colours

The 2022–23 season was the 103rd season in the history of CA Osasuna and their fourth consecutive season in the top flight. The club participated in La Liga and the Copa del Rey, finishing as runners-up in the latter competition.

== Players ==
=== First-team squad ===
As of 27 January 2023

Note: Flags indicate national team as defined under FIFA eligibility rules; some limited exceptions apply. Players may hold more than one non-FIFA nationality.

No.	Pos.	Nation	Player
1	GK	ESP	Sergio Herrera
2	DF	ESP	Nacho Vidal
3	DF	ESP	Juan Cruz
4	DF	ESP	Unai García (vice-captain)
5	DF	ESP	David García (captain)
6	MF	ESP	Lucas Torró
7	MF	ESP	Jon Moncayola
8	MF	SRB	Darko Brašanac
9	FW	ARG	Chimy Ávila
11	MF	ESP	Kike Barja
12	FW	MAR	Abde Ezzalzouli (on loan from Barcelona)
14	MF	ESP	Rubén García

No.	Pos.	Nation	Player
15	DF	ESP	Rubén Peña
16	MF	ESP	Moi Gómez
17	FW	CRO	Ante Budimir
18	FW	ESP	Kike García
19	MF	ESP	Pablo Ibáñez
20	DF	ESP	Manu Sánchez (on loan from Atlético Madrid)
22	MF	ESP	Aimar Oroz
23	DF	ESP	Aridane Hernández
25	GK	ESP	Aitor Fernández
31	DF	ESP	Jorge Herrando
33	FW	ESP	Iker Benito
35	DF	ESP	Diego Moreno

== Transfers ==
=== In ===
Date	Player	From	Type	Fee	Ref.
1 July 2022	(Spain) Rubén Peña	Villarreal	Transfer	Free	
2 July 2022	(Spain) Aitor Fernández	Levante	Transfer	Free	
27 July 2022	(Spain) Manu Sánchez	Atlético Madrid	Loan		
28 July 2022	(Spain) Moi Gómez	Villarreal	Transfer	€1.8m	
1 September 2022	(Morocco) Abde Ezzalzouli	Barcelona	Loan		

=== Out ===
Date	Player	To	Type	Fee	Ref.
1 June 2022	(Spain) Oier	(Cyprus) AEK Larnaca	Transfer	Free	
1 June 2022	(Spain) Iñigo Pérez	Released			
1 June 2022	(Angola) Jonás Ramalho	Málaga	Transfer	Free	
7 July 2022	(Spain) Marc Cardona	Las Palmas	Transfer	Free	
31 July 2022	(Spain) Cote	Sporting Gijón	Transfer	Free	
10 August 2022	(Spain) Robert Ibáñez	Levante	Transfer	Free	
23 August 2022	(Spain) Jesús Areso	Burgos	Loan		
1 September 2022	(Spain) Javi Martínez	Albacete	Loan		

== Pre-season and friendlies ==
Win Draw Loss

16 July 2022 Friendly	Osasuna	3–0	Osasuna B	Aranguren
--:-- CEST (UTC+2)	García 26', 38'; Benito 35'	Report		Stadium: Tajonar Facilities; Referee: Gonzalo López Romero

19 July 2022 Friendly	Osasuna	3–3	Toulouse	Aranguren
18:30 CEST (UTC+2)	Ávila 21'; Kike 85' (pen.); Barbero 90+2'	Report	Chaïbi 11'; Ngoumou 36'; Skyttä 77'	Stadium: Tajonar Facilities; Attendance: 1,300; Referee: David Recio

23 July 2022 Trofeo Villa de Mendigorria	Osasuna	4–3	Huesca	Mendigorría
19:30 CEST (UTC+2)	Yoldi 33'; Moncayola 41'; Barbero 52'; Ávila 87'	Report	Soko 29'; Muñoz 49'; García 77'	Stadium: Estadio El Pontarrón; Attendance: 1,200; Referee: Imanol Irurtzun

27 July 2022 Friendly	Real Sociedad	1–0	Osasuna	San Sebastián
19:00 CEST (UTC+1)	Aguirre 88'	Report		Stadium: Estadio Zubieta XXI; Referee: Ibai Rezola Etxeberría

30 July 2022 Friendly	Groningen	2–1	Osasuna	Groningen, Netherlands
16:00 CEST (UTC+2)	Ngonge 5'; Kasanwirjo 22'	Report	Ibáñez 56'	Stadium: Euroborg

31 July 2022 Friendly	Feyenoord	1–2	Osasuna	Rotterdam, Netherlands
17:00 CEST (UTC+2)	Bassett 88'		Torres 30'; Barja 90'	Stadium: De Kuip; Attendance: 0 Referee: Erwin Blank

5 August 2022 Friendly	Osasuna	1–0	Burgos	Aranguren
11:30 CEST (UTC+2)	Ibáñez 58'; Herrando (yellow card) 65'		Del Cerro (yellow card) 82'	Stadium: Tajonar Facilities; Attendance: 600; Referee: Irurtzun Artola

5 August 2022 Friendly	Mirandés	1–2	Osasuna	Miranda de Ebro
19:00 CEST (UTC+2)	Aridane 26' (o.g.)		Brašanac 61'; Rober 75'	Stadium: Estadio Municipal de Anduva

22 September 2022 Friendly	Valladolid	0–2	Osasuna	Burgos
12:00 CEST (UTC+2)			Moncayola 39'; Kike 52'	Stadium: Estadio El Plantío

10 December 2022 Friendly	Osasuna	1–1	Lorient	Pamplona
13:00 CET (UTC+1)	Torró (yellow card) 5'; Aridane (yellow card) 45'; R. García 85'		Diarra 39'

13 December 2022 Friendly	Osasuna	3–0	Brest	Palamós
12:00 CET (UTC+1)	Ávila 3'; U. García 68'; Torres 86'		Camara (red card) 73'	Stadium: Estadi Palamós Costa Brava

14 December 2022 Friendly	Girona	1–1	Osasuna	Girona
11:00 CET (UTC+1)	Roca (yellow card) 29'; García 72'		Torró 66'	Stadium: Estadi Montilivi

== Competitions ==
=== Overall record ===
Competition	First match	Last match	Starting round	Final position	Record							
Competition	First match	Last match	Starting round	Final position	Pld	W	D	L	GF	GA	GD	Win %
La Liga	12 August 2022	4 June 2023	Matchday 1	7th	38	15	8	15	37	42	−5	39.47
Copa del Rey	12 November 2022	6 May 2023	First round	Runners-up	8	5	2	1	16	9	+7	62.50
Total					46	20	10	16	53	51	+2	43.48

Source: Soccerway

=== La Liga ===
==== League table ====
Pos	Team	Pld	W	D	L	GF	GA	GD	Pts	Qualification or relegation
5	Villarreal	38	19	7	12	59	40	+19	64	Qualification for the Europa League group stage
6	Real Betis	38	17	9	12	46	41	+5	60	Qualification for the Europa League group stage
7	Osasuna	38	15	8	15	37	42	−5	53	Qualification for the Europa Conference League play-off round (Note: Osasuna were initially disqualified from the 2023–24 UEFA Europa Conference League due to historic match-fixing. However, the club became later eligible to participate after an evidence of innocence had been provided.)
8	Athletic Bilbao	38	14	9	15	47	43	+4	51	
9	Mallorca	38	14	8	16	37	43	−6	50	

Source: LaLiga Santander
Rules for classification: 1) Points; 2) Head-to-head points; 3) Head-to-head goal difference; 4) Goal difference; 5) Goals scored; 6) Fair-play points (Note: Head-to-head record is used only after all the matches between the teams in question have been played)

==== Results summary ====
Overall								Home						Away					
Pld	W	D	L	GF	GA	GD	Pts	W	D	L	GF	GA	GD	W	D	L	GF	GA	GD
38	15	8	15	37	42	−5	53	11	1	7	24	21	+3	4	7	8	13	21	−8

Source: La Liga

==== Results by round ====
Round	1	2	3	4	5	6	7	8	9	10	11	12	13	14	15	16	17	18	19	20	21	22	23	24	25	26	27	28	29	30	31	32	33	34	35	36	37	38
Ground	H	H	A	H	A	H	A	H	A	H	A	H	A	H	A	A	H	A	H	A	A	H	A	H	A	H	A	H	A	H	A	H	A	H	A	H	A	H
Result	W	W	L	W	W	L	D	L	L	W	D	W	W	L	L	D	W	D	L	D	D	L	W	D	L	L	D	W	L	W	W	L	L	W	L	W	L	W
Position	5	4	7	5	4	5	6	8	9	7	8	7	5	7	9	8	7	7	8	9	9	10	8	8	8	10	9	8	10	8	8	9	10	9	10	7	7	7

Source: La Liga
A = Away; H = Home; W = Win; D = Draw; L = Loss

==== Matches ====
The league fixtures were announced on 23 June 2022.

12 August 2022 1	Osasuna	2–1	Sevilla	Pamplona
21:00 CEST (UTC+2)	Ávila 9', (yellow card) 68'; D. García (yellow card) 34'; U. García (yellow card) 50'; Oroz 74' (pen.); Herrera (yellow card) 90+2'; Gómez (yellow card) 90+3'	Report	Mir 11'; Gómez (yellow card) 72'; Fernando (yellow card) 83'; Romero (yellow card) 90+5'	Stadium: El Sadar; Attendance: 18,536; Referee: Carlos del Cerro Grande

20 August 2022 2	Osasuna	2–0	Cádiz	Pamplona
17:30 CEST (UTC+2)	Ávila 37' (pen.), (yellow card) 58'; Torró (yellow card) 45+2'; Kike 79' (pen.)	Report	Alejo (yellow card) 45+4'; Alarcón (yellow card) 47' (yellow-red card) 76'; Chust (yellow card) 78'; Lozano (yellow card) 90+4'	Stadium: El Sadar; Attendance: 18,587; Referee: Antonio Mateu Lahoz

26 August 2022 3	Real Betis	1–0	Osasuna	Seville
22:00 CEST (UTC+2)	Iglesias 34'; Pezzella (red card) 73'	Report	Oroz (yellow card) 14'; U. García (yellow card) 68'; D. García (yellow card) 83'	Stadium: Benito Villamarín; Attendance: 52,580; Referee: Juan Martínez Munuera

4 September 2022 4	Osasuna	2–1	Rayo Vallecano	Pamplona
14:00 CEST (UTC+2)	Cruz (yellow card) 41'; Oroz 54'; U. García (yellow card) 83'; R. García 90'	Report	Ciss (yellow card) 48'; A. García (yellow card) 60'; Lejeune 75'	Stadium: El Sadar; Attendance: 18,745; Referee: Alejandro Muñiz Ruiz

12 September 2022 5	Almería	0–1	Osasuna	Almería
21:00 CEST (UTC+2)		Report	D. García (yellow card) 5'; Ávila 28'; Gómez (yellow card) 81'	Stadium: Power Horse Stadium; Attendance: 12,397; Referee: Javier Iglesias Villanueva

18 September 2022 6	Osasuna	0–2	Getafe	Pamplona
14:00 CEST (UTC+2)	R. García (yellow card) 35'; Ávila (red card) 43'; Vidal (yellow card) 48'; Peña (yellow card) 59'; Brašanac (yellow card) 64'; Budimir (yellow card) 69'; Moncayola (yellow card) 73'; D. García (yellow card) 75'	Report	Iglesias 30'; Duarte (yellow card) 35'; Milla (yellow card) 68' (yellow-red card) 90+1'; Álvarez 76'	Stadium: El Sadar; Attendance: 18,255; Referee: Isidro Díaz de Mera Escuderos

2 October 2022 7	Real Madrid	1–1	Osasuna	Madrid
21:00 CEST (UTC+2)	Vinícius 42'; Ceballos (yellow card) 45+1'; Benzema (penalty missed) 79'	Report	Ezzalzouli (yellow card) 47'; Kike 50', (yellow card) 78'; D. García (red card) 78'	Stadium: Santiago Bernabéu; Attendance: 55,410; Referee: Guillermo Cuadra Fernández

7 October 2022 8	Osasuna	1–2	Valencia	Pamplona
21:00 CEST (UTC+2)	Ávila (penalty missed) 57'; Torró (yellow card) 64'; U. García (red card) 69'; Brašanac (yellow card) 83', (goal) 90+3'; Peña (red card) 90+6'; Herrera (yellow card) 90+7'	Report	Kluivert 28'; Guillamón (yellow card) 38'; Diakhaby 54', (yellow card) 84' (yellow-red card) 90+1'; Moriba (yellow card) 57'; Cavani (penalty missed) 70'; Musah (yellow card) 73'; Cömert (yellow card) 79'	Stadium: El Sadar; Attendance: 20,260; Referee: Miguel Ángel Ortiz Arias

17 October 2022 9	Villarreal	2–0	Osasuna	Valencia
21:00 CEST (UTC+2)	Danjuma 42', 52' (pen.); Albiol (yellow card) 66'; Trigueros (yellow card) 90+2'	Report	Brašanac (yellow card) 27'; Herrera (yellow card) 49'; Cruz (yellow card) 61'; Kike (yellow card) 66'; R. García (yellow card) 72'; Oroz (yellow card) 78'	Stadium: Ciutat de València; Attendance: 9,699; Referee: Pablo González Fuertes

20 October 2022 10	Osasuna	1–0	Espanyol	Pamplona
20:00 CET (UTC+1)	Braithwaite (yellow card) 53'; Budimir 55'	Report	D. García (yellow card) 27'; Calero (yellow card) 73'	Stadium: El Sadar; Attendance: 17,832; Referee: Mario Melero López

23 October 2022 11	Girona	1–1	Osasuna	Girona
18:30 CEST (UTC+2)	López 45+1'; Miguel (yellow card) 88'; Reinier (yellow card) 88'	Report	Barja 37'; Torró (yellow card) 45'; Vidal (yellow card) 70'; Cruz (yellow card) 72'	Stadium: Estadi Montilivi; Attendance: 10,032; Referee: Juan Luis Pulido Santana

30 October 2022 12	Osasuna	2–0	Valladolid	Pamplona
14:00 CET (UTC+1)	Ávila 13'; Gómez 19'; Torró (yellow card) 47'	Report	Rosa (yellow card) 29'; Mesa (yellow card) 33'; Olaza (yellow card) 45+1'	Stadium: El Sadar; Attendance: 19,429; Referee: Guillermo Cuadra Fernández

5 November 2022 13	Celta Vigo	1–2	Osasuna	Vigo
18:30 CET (UTC+1)	Aspas 19'; Swedberg (yellow card) 66'	Report	U. García (yellow card) 5'; Ávila 8', 28', (yellow card) 16'; Oroz (yellow card) 42'; Fernández (yellow card) 44'; Kike (yellow card) 88'	Stadium: Balaídos; Attendance: 14,209; Referee: Jorge Figueroa Vázquez

8 November 2022 14	Osasuna	1–2	Barcelona	Pamplona
21:30 CET (UTC+1)	D. García 6', (yellow card) 46'; Cruz (yellow card) 45+3'; Torró (yellow card) 54'; Moncayola (yellow card) 61'	Report	Lewandowski (yellow card) 11' (yellow-red card) 31'; Alba (yellow card) 37'; Pedri 48'; Balde (yellow card) 66'; Raphinha 85'	Stadium: El Sadar; Attendance: 21,603; Referee: Jesús Gil Manzano

31 December 2022 15	Real Sociedad	2–0	Osasuna	San Sebastián
16:15 CET (UTC+1)	Méndez 22', (yellow card) 68'; Sørloth 64'	Report	U. García (yellow card) 57'	Stadium: Anoeta; Attendance: 34,847; Referee: Valentín Pizarro Gómez

9 January 2023 16	Athletic Bilbao	0–0	Osasuna	Bilbao
21:00 CET (UTC+1)		Report	Budimir (yellow card) 65'	Stadium: San Mamés; Attendance: 39,216; Referee: Mario Melero López

14 January 2023 17	Osasuna	1–0	Mallorca	Pamplona
18:30 CET (UTC+1)	Oroz 47'; Ávila (yellow card) 58'; Torró (yellow card) 78'	Report	Lee (yellow card) 39'; Grenier (yellow card) 90+4'; Valjent (yellow card) 90+4'	Stadium: El Sadar; Attendance: 19,887; Referee: César Soto Grado

22 January 2023 18	Elche	1–1	Osasuna	Elche
16:15 CET (UTC+1)	Carmona (yellow card) 13', (goal) 67'; Blanco (yellow card) 45'	Report	Ávila 20', (yellow card) 55'	Stadium: Martínez Valero; Attendance: 17,589; Referee: Alejandro Muñiz Ruiz

29 January 2023 19	Osasuna	0–1	Atlético Madrid	Pamplona
16:15 CET (UTC+1)	Brašanac (yellow card) 70'	Report	Saúl 74'	Stadium: El Sadar; Attendance: 20,934; Referee: Javier Alberola Rojas

4 February 2023 20	Espanyol	1–1	Osasuna	Cornellà de Llobregat
14:00 CET (UTC+1)	Pierre-Gabriel (yellow card) 45+4' (yellow-red card) 45+4'; Vidal (yellow card) 45+4'; Braithwaite 59'	Report	Ezzalzouli (yellow card) 16' (yellow-red card) 45+4'; Gómez (yellow card) 29'; Budimir 45'; U. García (yellow card) 61'; Moncayola (yellow card) 78'	Stadium: RCDE Stadium; Attendance: 22,313; Referee: Jesús Gil Manzano

12 February 2023 21	Valladolid	0–0	Osasuna	Valladolid
18:30 CET (UTC+1)	Machís (yellow card) 36'	Report	Cruz (yellow card) 34'; Sánchez (yellow card) 85'; Ávila (yellow card) 88'	Stadium: José Zorilla; Attendance: 21,102; Referee: Guillermo Cuadra Fernández

19 February 2023 22	Osasuna	0–2	Real Madrid	Pamplona
21:00 CET (UTC+1)	Torró (yellow card) 5'; Moncayola (yellow card) 45+2'; Gómez (yellow card) 45+3'	Report	Vinícius (yellow card) 45+3'; Valverde 78'; Nacho (yellow card) 84'; Asensio 90+2'	Stadium: El Sadar; Attendance: 21,668; Referee: José Luis Munuera Montero

26 February 2023 23	Sevilla	2–3	Osasuna	Seville
21:00 CET (UTC+1)	Gueye (yellow card) 43'; Gudelj 63'; En-Nesyri 78', (yellow card) 90+4'; Acuña (yellow card) 79'; Ocampos (yellow card) 88'; Fernando (red card) 90+4'	Report	Oroz (yellow card) 12'; D. García 18'; Barja (yellow card) 65'; Fernando 67' (o.g.); Ezzalzouli 85'	Stadium: Ramón Sánchez Pizjuán; Attendance: 34,538; Referee: Juan Luis Pulido Santana

6 March 2023 24	Osasuna	0–0	Celta Vigo	Pamplona
21:00 CET (UTC+1)		Report	De la Torre (yellow card) 13'; Mallo (yellow card) 90+3'	Stadium: El Sadar; Attendance: 17,684; Referee: José María Sánchez Martínez

11 March 2023 25	Valencia	1–0	Osasuna	Valencia
21:00 CET (UTC+1)	Duro (yellow card) 71', (penalty missed) 90+1'; Kluivert 74'; Gayà (yellow card) 90+6'	Report	D. García (yellow card) 3'; Cruz (yellow card) 16'; Ávila (yellow card) 36'; Torró (yellow card) 68'; Oroz (yellow card) 87'	Stadium: Mestalla; Attendance: 37,762; Referee: Javier Iglesias Villanueva

19 March 2023 26	Osasuna	0–3	Villarreal	Pamplona
16:15 CET (UTC+1)	Vidal (yellow card) 39'; Torró (yellow card) 47'; Brašanac (yellow card) 72'	Report	Chukwueze 14'; Pino (yellow card) 57'; Morales 85', 90+3', (yellow card) 87'	Stadium: El Sadar; Attendance: 20,169; Referee: Alejandro Muñiz Ruiz

31 March 2023 27	Mallorca	0–0	Osasuna	Palma
21:00 CEST (UTC+2)	Baba (yellow card) 30'; Ruiz de Galarreta (yellow card) 37'; González (yellow card) 45+1'; Copete (red card) 69'; Lee (yellow card) 70'; Raíllo (yellow card) 74'; Ángel (yellow card) 74'; Costa (yellow card) 90+4'	Report	Vidal (yellow card) 34'; Budimir (yellow card) 90+2'; Moreno (yellow card) 90+4'	Stadium: Visit Mallorca Stadium; Attendance: 14,312; Referee: Isidro Díaz de Mera Escuderos

8 April 2023 28	Osasuna	2–1	Elche	Pamplona
14:00 CEST (UTC+2)	Ezzalzouli 71', 84'; Oroz (yellow card) 90+4'	Report	Morente 44'; Boyé (yellow card) 45+3'; Fidel (yellow card) 50'; Palacios (yellow card) 54'	Stadium: El Sadar; Attendance: 16,925; Referee: Pablo González Fuertes

14 April 2023 29	Rayo Vallecano	2–1	Osasuna	Madrid
21:00 CEST (UTC+2)	Aridane 40' (o.g.); Palazón 43'; A. García (yellow card) 48'; Catena (yellow card) 90+1'	Report	Kike (yellow card) 47'; Gómez 66', (yellow card) 88'; D. García (yellow card) 90+6'	Stadium: Vallecas; Attendance: 12,726; Referee: José Luis Munuera Montero

22 April 2023 30	Osasuna	3–2	Real Betis	Pamplona
14:00 CEST (UTC+2)	Budimir 6', 11'; Moncayola 41'; Aridane (yellow card) 43'; Kike (yellow card) 90+3'	Report	Miranda 16'; Rodríguez 70'	Stadium: El Sadar; Attendance: 19,723; Referee: Javier Alberola Rojas

25 April 2023 31	Cádiz	0–1	Osasuna	Cádiz
19:30 CEST (UTC+2)		Report	R. García 62'; Ezzalzouli (red card) 85'; Sánchez (yellow card) 86'	Stadium: Nuevo Mirandilla; Attendance: 18,008; Referee: Carlos del Cerro Grande

28 April 2023 32	Osasuna	0–2	Real Sociedad	Pamplona
21:00 CEST (UTC+2)	Cruz (yellow card) 67'; Sánchez (yellow card) 83'; Moncayola (yellow card) 89'	Report	Herrera 6' (o.g.); Zubeldia (yellow card) 88'; Kubo 90'	Stadium: El Sadar; Attendance: 21,570; Referee: Valentín Pizarro Gómez

2 May 2023 33	Barcelona	1–0	Osasuna	Barcelona
19:30 CEST (UTC+2)	Alba 85'	Report	Herrando (red card) 27'	Stadium: Camp Nou; Attendance: 76,061; Referee: Javier Iglesias Villanueva

13 May 2023 34	Osasuna	3–1	Almería	Pamplona
16:15 CEST (UTC+2)	Budimir 46'; Ezzalzouli 51'; Gómez 81'	Report	Lázaro 90+2'	Stadium: El Sadar; Attendance: 19,747; Referee: Antonio Mateu Lahoz

21 May 2023 35	Atlético Madrid	3–0	Osasuna	Madrid
16:15 CEST (UTC+2)	Carrasco 44'; Saúl 62'; Correa 82'	Report	Budimir (yellow card) 28'; Peña (yellow card) 65'	Stadium: Cívitas Metropolitano; Attendance: 57,012; Referee: Pablo González Fuertes

25 May 2023 36	Osasuna	2–0	Athletic Bilbao	Pamplona
19:30 CEST (UTC+2)	Torró (yellow card) 31', (goal) 77'; Budimir 50', (yellow card) 66'; Ibáñez (yellow card) 84'	Report	De Marcos (yellow card) 15'; Berenguer (yellow card) 74'; Vivian (yellow card) 76'	Stadium: El Sadar; Attendance: 19,830; Referee: Alejandro Muñiz Ruiz

28 May 2023 37	Getafe	2–1	Osasuna	Getafe
19:00 CEST (UTC+2)	Portu (yellow card) 24'; Latasa 39'; Maksimović (yellow card) 54'; Djené (yellow card) 81'; Mata 90'	Report	Ávila 2'; Ezzalzouli (yellow card) 31'	Stadium: Coliseum Alfonso Pérez; Attendance: 13,510; Referee: Antonio Mateu Lahoz

4 June 2023 38	Osasuna	2–1	Girona	Pamplona
18:30 CEST (UTC+2)	Budimir 52', 55'; Moncayola (yellow card) 73'	Report	Herrera (yellow card) 36'; Espinosa (yellow card) 56'; Reinier 75'; Couto (yellow card) 90+3'; Stuani (yellow card) 90+3'; Gazzaniga (yellow card) 90+6'	Stadium: El Sadar; Attendance: 22,128; Referee: Miguel Ángel Ortiz Arias

=== Copa del Rey ===
12 November 2022 First round	Fuentes	1–4	Osasuna	Fuentes de Ebro
16:00 CET (UTC+1)	Requeno 44'	Report	Brašanac 42'; Vidal 49'; Kike 54', 64'	Stadium: San Miguel; Referee: José Luis Munuera Montero

21 December 2022 Second round	Arnedo	1–3	Osasuna	Arnedo
21:00 CET (UTC+1)	Amelivia 65'	Report	Kike 13', 31'; R. García 14'	Stadium: Sendero; Attendance: 4,000; Referee: Mario Melero López

5 January 2023 Round of 32	Gimnàstic	1–2 (a.e.t.)	Osasuna	Tarragona
16:00 CET (UTC+1)	Quintanilla (yellow card) 65'; Gorostidi (yellow card) 70'; P. Fernández 78', (red card) 84'; Oriol (yellow card) 84'; Lupu (yellow card) 90+6'; Jiménez (yellow card) 108'	Report	Kike 16'; D. García (yellow card) 41'; Peña (yellow card) 63'; Brašanac (yellow card) 74'; Montes 112' (o.g.); Ibáñez (red card) 119'	Stadium: Nou Estadi; Attendance: 8,282; Referee: Isidro Díaz de Mera Escuderos

18 January 2023 Round of 16	Real Betis	2–2 (a.e.t.) (2–4 p)	Osasuna	Seville
21:00 CET (UTC+1)	Carvalho 62'; Sabaly 103'	Report	Oroz (yellow card) 59'; D. García (yellow card) 78', (goal) 90+1'; R. García 106'	Stadium: Benito Villamarín; Attendance: 35,817; Referee: Javier Alberola Rojas
	Penalties
	Iglesias (penalty scored); Loren (penalty scored); Canales (penalty missed); Rodríguez (penalty missed)		(penalty scored) Ávila; (penalty scored) Budimir; (penalty scored) Moncayola; (penalty scored) Barja

25 January 2023 Quarter-finals	Osasuna	2–1 (a.e.t.)	Sevilla	Pamplona
22:00 CET (UTC+1)	Moncayola (yellow card) 30'; Ávila 71'; Gómez (yellow card) 90+2'; Ezzalzouli 99'	Report	Nianzou (yellow card) 31'; En-Nesyri 90+4'; Lamela (yellow card) 114'	Stadium: El Sadar; Attendance: 19,724; Referee: Ricardo de Burgos Bengoetxea

1 March 2023 Semi-finals; First leg	Osasuna	1–0	Athletic Bilbao	Pamplona
21:00 CET (UTC+1)	Ezzalzouli 47'; Budimir (yellow card) 52'; Gómez (yellow card) 54'; Brašanac (yellow card) 90+1'	Report	Berenguer (yellow card) 40'; Vesga (yellow card) 43'; Martínez (yellow card) 64'	Stadium: El Sadar; Attendance: 23,026; Referee: Jesús Gil Manzano

4 April 2023 Semi-finals; Second leg	Athletic Bilbao	1–1 (a.e.t.) (1–2 agg.)	Osasuna	Bilbao
21:00 CEST (UTC+2)	Vesga (yellow card) 21'; I. Williams 33'; Sancet (yellow card) 94'	Report	Torró (yellow card) 43'; Barja (yellow card) 75'; Ibáñez 116'	Stadium: San Mamés; Attendance: 51,544; Referee: Carlos del Cerro Grande

6 May 2023 Final	Real Madrid	2–1	Osasuna	Seville
22:00 CEST (UTC+2)	Rodrygo 2', 70'; Militão (yellow card) 41'; Vinícius (yellow card) 45'; Camavinga (yellow card) 75'; Valverde (yellow card) 90'; Courtois (yellow card) 90+4'	Report	Moncayola (yellow card) 21'; D. García (yellow card) 37'; Torró 58'; Barja (yellow card) 83'; Ibáñez (yellow card) 90+4'	Stadium: La Cartuja; Attendance: 55,579; Referee: José María Sánchez Martínez

== Statistics ==
=== Appearances and goals ===
Last updated 4 June 2023

No.	Pos	Nat	Player	Total		La Liga		Copa del Rey	
No.	Pos	Nat	Player	Apps	Goals	Apps	Goals	Apps	Goals
Goalkeepers
1	GK	(Spain) ESP	Sergio Herrera	24	0	17	0	7	0
25	GK	(Spain) ESP	Aitor Fernández	22	0	21	0	1	0
Defenders
2	DF	(Spain) ESP	Nacho Vidal	22	1	15+5	0	1+1	1
3	DF	(Spain) ESP	Juan Cruz	29	0	21+2	0	5+1	0
4	DF	(Spain) ESP	Unai García	23	0	20+1	0	2	0
5	DF	(Spain) ESP	David García	39	3	31+1	2	7	1
15	DF	(Spain) ESP	Rubén Peña	24	0	14+6	0	3+1	0
20	DF	(Spain) ESP	Manu Sánchez	36	0	22+9	0	3+2	0
23	DF	(Spain) ESP	Aridane	31	0	20+3	0	6+2	0
31	DF	(Spain) ESP	Jorge Herrando	2	0	1	0	1	0
35	DF	(Spain) ESP	Diego Moreno	14	0	7+4	0	0+3	0
Midfielders
6	MF	(Spain) ESP	Lucas Torró	38	2	31+2	1	5	1
7	MF	(Spain) ESP	Jon Moncayola	44	1	25+12	1	5+2	0
8	MF	(Serbia) SRB	Darko Brašanac	32	2	9+16	1	4+3	1
11	MF	(Spain) ESP	Kike Barja	35	1	15+12	1	4+4	0
14	MF	(Spain) ESP	Rubén García	37	4	11+18	2	4+4	2
16	MF	(Spain) ESP	Moi Gómez	38	3	28+5	3	4+1	0
19	MF	(Spain) ESP	Pablo Ibáñez	31	1	12+13	0	3+3	1
22	MF	(Spain) ESP	Aimar Oroz	38	3	23+8	3	5+2	0
34	MF	(Spain) ESP	Iker Muñoz	8	0	2+6	0	0	0
Forwards
9	FW	(Argentina) ARG	Chimy Ávila	36	9	23+6	8	3+4	1
12	FW	(Morocco) MAR	Abde Ezzalzouli	34	6	19+9	4	4+2	2
17	FW	(Croatia) CRO	Ante Budimir	37	8	22+9	8	3+3	0
18	FW	(Spain) ESP	Kike García	43	7	7+28	2	6+2	5
33	FW	(Spain) ESP	Iker Benito	4	0	2+2	0	0	0
Players who have made an appearance or had a squad number this season but have been loaned out or transferred
10	MF	(Spain) ESP	Roberto Torres	4	0	0+2	0	2	0
