= Javi Martínez (footballer, born 1999) =

Spanish footballer

Personal information
- Full name: Javier Martínez Calvo
- Date of birth: 22 December 1999 (age 26)
- Place of birth: Ólvega, Spain
- Height: 1.80 m (5 ft 11 in)
- Position: Winger

Team information
- Current team: Eldense

Youth career
- Osasuna

Senior career*
Years	Team	Apps	(Gls)
2016–2021	Osasuna B	78	(5)
2019–2025	Osasuna	42	(2)
2022–2023	→ Albacete (loan)	7	(0)
2023–2024	→ Huesca (loan)	50	(5)
2025–2026	Eibar	48	(1)
2026–	Eldense	0	(0)

International career
2017–2018	Spain U19	4	(0)
- * Club domestic league appearances and goals as of 6 June 2026

Javier "Javi" Martínez Calvo (born 22 December 1999) is a Spanish professional footballer who plays as a winger for CD Eldense.

== Club career ==
Born in Ólvega, Soria, Castile and León, Martínez represented CA Osasuna as a youth. On 2 November 2016, aged only 16, he made his senior debut with the reserves by coming on as a second-half substitute in a 1–2 Segunda División B home loss against Racing de Ferrol.

On 8 September 2017, Martínez extended his contract until 2022. He scored his first senior goal nine days later, netting his team's first in a 2–2 draw at CD Lealtad.

Martínez made his professional debut on 31 May 2019, replacing goalscorer Xisco in a 3–2 away success over Córdoba CF in the Segunda División, as his side was already promoted. His La Liga debut occurred on 19 July of the following year, as he replaced fellow youth graduate Kike Barja late into a 2–2 home draw against RCD Mallorca.

Martínez scored his first professional goal on 17 January 2021, netting the opener in a 2–0 away win over RCD Espanyol, for the season's Copa del Rey. His first goal in the main category occurred on 21 April, as he again netted the opener in a 3–1 success over Valencia CF also at the El Sadar Stadium.

On 1 September 2022, Martínez was loaned to Albacete Balompié in the second division, for one year. The following 31 January, he moved to fellow league team SD Huesca also in a temporary deal.

On 23 August 2023, Martínez returned to Huesca on loan for the 2023–24 season. Back to Osasuna in July 2024, he only featured in one league match before terminating his link on 8 January 2025; hours later, he was announced at SD Eibar on a two-and-a-half-year deal.

On 29 July 2026, Martínez left the Armeros and signed a two-year contract with fellow second division side CD Eldense.

== Career statistics ==
=== Club ===
As of match played 23 August 2021

Appearances and goals by club, season and competition
Club	Season	League			National cup		Other		Total	
Club	Season	Division	Apps	Goals	Apps	Goals	Apps	Goals	Apps	Goals
Osasuna B	2016–17	Segunda División B	1	0	—		—		1	0
Osasuna B	2017–18	Segunda División B	32	1	—		—		32	1
Osasuna B	2018–19	Tercera División	16	2	—		—		16	2
Osasuna B	2019–20	Segunda División B	22	1	—		—		22	1
Osasuna B	2020–21	Segunda División B	7	1	—		—		7	1
Osasuna B	Total		78	5	0	0	0	0	78	5
Osasuna	2018–19	Segunda División	1	0	0	0	—		1	0
Osasuna	2019–20	La Liga	1	0	1	0	—		2	0
Osasuna	2020–21	La Liga	13	1	4	1	—		17	2
Osasuna	2021–22	La Liga	26	1	3	0	—		29	0
Osasuna	2022–23	La Liga	0	0	0	0	—		0	0
Osasuna	Total		41	2	8	1	0	0	49	2
Career total			119	7	8	1	0	0	127	8

== Honours ==
Osasuna

- Segunda División: 2018–19
