= 2021–22 CA Osasuna season =

CA Osasuna
2021–22 season
- President: Luis Sabalza
- Head coach: Jagoba Arrasate
- Stadium: El Sadar
- La Liga: 10th
- Copa del Rey: Round of 32
- Top goalscorer: League: Ante Budimir (8); All: Ante Budimir (9)
- Highest home attendance: 21,741 vs Real Sociedad (7 November 2021)
- Lowest home attendance: 13,758 vs Real Betis (23 September 2021)
- Biggest win: Rayo Vallecano 0–3 Osasuna
- Biggest defeat: Barcelona 4–0 Osasuna
Home colours	Away colours	Third colours

The 2021–22 season was the 91st season in the existence of CA Osasuna and the club's third consecutive season in the top flight of Spanish football. In addition to the domestic league, Osasuna participated in this season's edition of the Copa del Rey.

== Players ==
=== First-team squad ===
As of 30 January 2022

Note: Flags indicate national team as defined under FIFA eligibility rules; some limited exceptions apply. Players may hold more than one non-FIFA nationality.

No.	Pos.	Nation	Player
1	GK	ESP	Sergio Herrera
2	DF	ESP	Nacho Vidal
3	DF	ESP	Juan Cruz
4	DF	ESP	Unai García
5	DF	ESP	David García (3rd captain)
6	MF	ESP	Oier (captain)
7	MF	ESP	Jon Moncayola
8	MF	SRB	Darko Brašanac
9	FW	ARG	Chimy Ávila
10	MF	ESP	Roberto Torres (vice-captain)
11	MF	ESP	Kike Barja
13	GK	ESP	Juan Pérez

No.	Pos.	Nation	Player
14	MF	ESP	Rubén García
15	DF	ANG	Jonás Ramalho
16	DF	ESP	Cote
17	FW	CRO	Ante Budimir
18	FW	ESP	Kike García
20	FW	ESP	Iván Barbero
21	MF	ESP	Iñigo Pérez
23	DF	ESP	Aridane
24	MF	ESP	Lucas Torró
28	MF	ESP	Javi Martínez
32	DF	ESP	Jesús Areso
39	DF	ESP	Manu Sánchez (on loan from Atlético Madrid)

=== Reserve team ===
Note: Flags indicate national team as defined under FIFA eligibility rules; some limited exceptions apply. Players may hold more than one non-FIFA nationality.

No.	Pos.	Nation	Player
31	DF	ESP	Unai Dufur
33	MF	ESP	Iker Benito
34	GK	ESP	Yoel Ramírez

No.	Pos.	Nation	Player
36	GK	ESP	Darío Ramos
37	MF	ESP	Pau Martínez

=== Out on loan ===
Note: Flags indicate national team as defined under FIFA eligibility rules; some limited exceptions apply. Players may hold more than one non-FIFA nationality.

No.	Pos.	Nation	Player
—	GK	ESP	Iván Martínez (at Castellón until 30 June 2022)
—	DF	ESP	Jorge Herrando (at Logroñés until 30 June 2022)
—	MF	ESP	Antonio Otegui (at Badajoz until 30 June 2022)

No.	Pos.	Nation	Player
—	MF	ECU	Kike Saverio (at Ponferradina until 30 June 2022)
—	MF	ESP	Rober (at Leganés until 30 June 2022)
—	FW	ESP	Marc Cardona (at Go Ahead Eagles until 30 June 2022)

== Transfers ==
=== In ===
Date	Player	From	Type	Fee	Ref
30 June 2021	(Spain) Iván Barbero	Alcorcón	Loan return		
30 June 2021	(Spain) Brandon	Leganés	Loan return		
30 June 2021	(Spain) Marc Cardona	Mallorca	Loan return		
30 June 2021	(Spain) Jaume Grau	(Portugal) Tondela	Loan return		
30 June 2021	(Spain) Robert Ibáñez	Leganés	Loan return		
1 July 2021	(Croatia) Ante Budimir	Mallorca	Buyout clause	€8M	
1 July 2021	(Spain) Kike	Eibar	Transfer	Free	

=== Out ===
Date	Player	To	Type	Fee	Ref
30 June 2021	(Argentina) Jonathan Calleri	(Uruguay) Deportivo Maldonado	Loan return		
30 June 2021	(Spain) Jony	(Italy) Lazio	Loan return		
30 June 2021	(Angola) Jonás Ramalho	Girona	Loan return		
30 June 2021	(Spain) Manu Sánchez	Atlético Madrid	Loan return		
1 July 2021	(Spain) Rubén Martínez	(Cyprus) AEK Larnaca	Transfer	Free	

== Pre-season and friendlies ==
Win Draw Loss Fixtures

21 July 2021 Friendly	Osasuna	2–1	Huesca	Ribaforada, Spain
19:30 CEST (UTC+2)	Vidal 47'; Ávila 60'	Report	Escriche 6'	Stadium: Estadio San Bartolomé; Attendance: 800; Referee: David Recio Moreno

24 July 2021 Friendly	Osasuna	2–0	Burgos	Pamplona, Spain
12:00 CEST (UTC+2)	Ávila 60'; Vidal 88'	Report		Stadium: Tajonar Facilities; Attendance: 330; Referee: Iosu Galech Apezteguia

28 July 2021 Friendly	Amorebieta	0–1	Osasuna	Amorebieta-Etxano, Spain
18:00 CEST (UTC+2)		Report	Oroz 53'	Stadium: Urritxe; Attendance: 400; Referee: Gorka Etayo Herrera

30 July 2021 Friendly	Valladolid	Cancelled	Osasuna	Soria, Spain
19:00 CEST (UTC+2)				Stadium: Nuevo Estadio Los Pajaritos

31 July 2021 Friendly	Osasuna	1–0	Mirandés	Navarre, Spain
11:00 CEST (UTC+2)	Barja 66'	Report		Stadium: Campo A2 de Tajonar; Attendance: 330; Referee: Eduardo Prieto Iglesias

4 August 2021 Friendly	Osasuna	2–0	UD Logroñés	Pamplona, Spain
11:00 BST (UTC+1)	Ibáñez 36'; U. García 73'	Report		Stadium: Tajonar Facilities; Attendance: 330; Referee: Gaizka Legarra Gorgoñon

6 August 2021 Euskal Herriko Txapela	Real Sociedad	1–3	Osasuna	Lasarte-Oria, Spain
20:30 CEST (UTC+2)	Willian José 55'	Report	Budimir 32', 65'; Grau 78'	Stadium: Zubieta Facilities; Attendance: 1,000; Referee: Aimar Velasco Arbaiza

9 August 2021 Friendly	Liverpool	3–1	Osasuna	Liverpool, England
19:00 BST (UTC+1)	Areso 14' (o.g.); Firmino 21', 41'	Report	Barja 70'	Stadium: Anfield; Attendance: 39,000; Referee: Craig Pawson

31 August 2021 Friendly	Numancia	1–1	Osasuna	Soria, Spain
19:00 CEST (UTC+2)	Suárez 17'		Barbero 89'	Stadium: Nuevo Estadio Los Pajaritos

8 October 2021 Friendly	Osasuna	2–1	Alavés	Pamplona, Spain
11:00 CEST (UTC+2)	Ávila 6'; Grau (yellow card) 30'; Barbero 73'	Report	Abqar (yellow card) 56'; Miguel 59'	Stadium: Tajonar Facilities; Attendance: 300; Referee: Gaizka Legarra Gorgoñón

27 January 2022 Friendly	Osasuna	0–1	Alavés	Pamplona, Spain
12:00 CET (UTC+1)		Report	Méndez 90'	Stadium: El Sadar; Attendance: 5,500; Referee: Eduardo Prieto Iglesias

== Competitions ==
=== Overall record ===
Competition	First match	Last match	Starting round	Final position	Record							
Competition	First match	Last match	Starting round	Final position	Pld	W	D	L	GF	GA	GD	Win %
La Liga	14 August 2021	22 May 2022	Matchday 1	10th	38	12	11	15	37	51	−14	31.58
Copa del Rey	2 December 2021	6 January 2022	First round	Round of 32	3	2	0	1	6	2	+4	66.67
Total					41	14	11	16	43	53	−10	34.15

Source: Soccerway

=== La Liga ===
==== League table ====
Pos	Team	Pld	W	D	L	GF	GA	GD	Pts
8	Athletic Bilbao	38	14	13	11	43	36	+7	55
9	Valencia	38	11	15	12	48	53	−5	48
10	Osasuna	38	12	11	15	37	51	−14	47
11	Celta Vigo	38	12	10	16	43	43	0	46
12	Rayo Vallecano	38	11	9	18	39	50	−11	42 (Note: Head-to-head points: Rayo Vallecano 9, Elche 7, Espanyol 1.)

Source: LaLiga Santander
Rules for classification: 1) Points; 2) Head-to-head points; 3) Head-to-head goal difference; 4) Goal difference; 5) Goals scored; 6) Fair-play points (Note: Head-to-head record is used only after all the matches between the teams in question have been played)

==== Results summary ====
Overall								Home						Away					
Pld	W	D	L	GF	GA	GD	Pts	W	D	L	GF	GA	GD	W	D	L	GF	GA	GD
38	12	11	15	37	51	−14	47	5	7	7	17	26	−9	7	4	8	20	25	−5

Source: La Liga

==== Results by round ====
Round	1	2	3	4	5	6	7	8	9	10	11	12	13	14	15	16	17	18	19	20	21	22	23	24	25	26	27	28	29	30	31	32	33	34	35	36	37	38
Ground	H	H	A	H	A	H	A	H	A	H	A	A	H	A	H	A	H	A	H	H	A	A	H	A	H	A	H	A	H	A	H	A	H	A	A	H	A	H
Result	D	D	W	L	W	L	W	W	W	D	D	L	L	L	D	D	D	L	L	W	L	W	D	W	L	L	W	L	W	L	W	W	L	D	D	D	L	L
Position	12	14	8	8	8	10	9	5	5	6	7	7	7	9	10	10	10	13	14	12	13	11	12	9	10	11	11	11	10	10	10	9	9	9	9	9	9	10

Source: La Liga
A = Away; H = Home; W = Win; D = Draw; L = Loss

==== Matches ====
The league fixtures were announced on 30 June 2021.

14 August 2021 1	Osasuna	0–0	Espanyol	Pamplona
22:00 CEST (UTC+2)	Moncayola (yellow card) 41'; U. García (yellow card) 49'; Barja (yellow card) 51'	Report	Melamed (yellow card) 13'; Gómez (yellow card) 51'; Gori (yellow card) 90'	Stadium: El Sadar; Attendance: 0 Referee: Miguel Ángel Ortiz Arias

23 August 2021 2	Osasuna	0–0	Celta Vigo	Pamplona
22:00 CEST (UTC+2)	Brašanac (yellow card) 33'; R. García (penalty missed) 48'; Oier (yellow card) 51'; Sánchez (yellow card) 77'; Torres (yellow card) 80'	Report	Domínguez (yellow card) 46'; Nolito (yellow card) 51'; Tapia (yellow card) 56'	Stadium: El Sadar; Attendance: 7,189; Referee: Javier Alberola Rojas

29 August 2021 3	Cádiz	2–3	Osasuna	Cádiz
19:30 CEST (UTC+2)	Fernández 16', 66' (pen.); Lozano (yellow card) 29'; Haroyan (yellow card) 36'; Alarcón (yellow card) 63'; Fali (yellow card) 84'	Report	Barja 60' (pen.); Torres 90+1' (pen.); D. García 90+5'	Stadium: Nuevo Mirandilla; Attendance: 7,452; Referee: Adrián Cordero Vega

12 September 2021 4	Osasuna	1–4	Valencia	Pamplona
16:15 CEST (UTC+2)	Moncayola 8', (yellow card) 89'; Torró (yellow card) 33'; D. García (yellow card) 57'; Herrera (yellow card) 75'	Report	Gómez 26'; Soler (yellow card) 28'; Aridane 51' (o.g.); Guedes 55'; Alderete 73', (yellow card) 81'	Stadium: El Sadar; Attendance: 13,940; Referee: Ricardo de Burgos Bengoetxea

18 September 2021 5	Alavés	0–2	Osasuna	Vitoria-Gasteiz
21:00 CEST (UTC+2)	Laguardia (yellow card) 13'; Moya (yellow card) 28'; Duarte (yellow card) 29'; Navarro (yellow card) 70'	Report	D. García 22'; Torres 29' (pen.), (yellow card) 31'; Torró (yellow card) 73'; Sánchez (yellow card) 82'	Stadium: Mendizorrotza; Attendance: 8,176; Referee: Alejandro Hernández Hernández

23 September 2021 6	Osasuna	1–3	Real Betis	Pamplona
19:30 CEST (UTC+2)	D. García (yellow card) 26'; Kike 39'; Brašanac (yellow card) 80'	Report	Hermoso 21'; Juanmi 80'; Willian José 90+3'	Stadium: El Sadar; Attendance: 13,758; Referee: Juan Martínez Munuera

26 September 2021 7	Mallorca	2–3	Osasuna	Palma
14:00 CEST (UTC+2)	Rodríguez 11'; Niño (yellow card) 20', (goal) 45+4'; Ruiz de Galarreta (yellow card) 90+6'	Report	José Ángel 9'; Aridane (yellow card) 15'; Pérez 58'; Oier (yellow card) 75'; Martínez 88'; U. García (yellow card) 90+2'	Stadium: Visit Mallorca Stadium; Attendance: 9,359; Referee: Miguel Ángel Ortiz Arias

2 October 2021 8	Osasuna	1–0	Rayo Vallecano	Pamplona
14:00 CEST (UTC+2)	Torró (yellow card) 45'; Martínez (yellow card) 76'; Sánchez 90+1'; Ávila (yellow card) 90+5'	Report	Balliu (yellow card) 5'; Trejo (yellow card) 32'; Falcao (yellow card) 41'	Stadium: El Sadar; Attendance: 19,238; Referee: Mario Melero López

17 October 2021 9	Villarreal	1–2	Osasuna	Villarreal
18:30 CEST (UTC+2)	Capoue (yellow card) 33'; Gerard 55'	Report	Torró 26', (yellow card) 86'; Herrera (yellow card) 30'; D. García (yellow card) 54'; U. García (yellow card) 60'; Ávila 87', (yellow card) 88'	Stadium: Estadio de la Cerámica; Attendance: 14,831; Referee: Adrián Cordero Vega

22 October 2021 10	Osasuna	1–1	Granada	Pamplona
21:00 CEST (UTC+2)	Vidal (yellow card) 29'; Ávila 45'; José Ángel (red card) 74'	Report	Abram (yellow card) 37'; Bacca (yellow card) 48'; Rochina (yellow card) 50'; Montoro 90'	Stadium: El Sadar; Attendance: 21,128; Referee: Alejandro Muñiz Ruiz

27 October 2021 11	Real Madrid	0–0	Osasuna	Madrid
21:30 CEST (UTC+2)	Camavinga (yellow card) 28'	Report	U. García (yellow card) 15'	Stadium: Santiago Bernabéu; Attendance: 35,691; Referee: César Soto Grado

30 October 2021 12	Sevilla	2–0	Osasuna	Seville
16:15 CEST (UTC+2)	Diego Carlos 40'; Ocampos 60'; Jordán (yellow card) 61'; Bounou (yellow card) 89'	Report	Areso (yellow card) 54'; Budimir (yellow card) 70'	Stadium: Ramón Sánchez Pizjuán; Attendance: 20,335; Referee: Carlos del Cerro Grande

7 November 2021 13	Osasuna	0–2	Real Sociedad	Pamplona
18:30 CET (UTC+1)		Report	Rico (yellow card) 28'; Merino 72'; Januzaj 82' (pen.); Zubimendi (yellow card) 90+1'	Stadium: El Sadar; Attendance: 21,741; Referee: Miguel Ángel Ortiz Arias

20 November 2021 14	Atlético Madrid	1–0	Osasuna	Madrid
18:30 CET (UTC+1)	Griezmann (yellow card) 45'; Felipe 87'; Martín (yellow card) 89'	Report	Torró (yellow card) 56'; D. García (yellow card) 82'	Stadium: Wanda Metropolitano; Attendance: 53,261; Referee: José María Sánchez Martínez

29 November 2021 15	Osasuna	1–1	Elche	Pamplona
21:00 CET (UTC+1)	Budimir 7' (pen.); Sánchez (yellow card) 90+1'	Report	Fidel (yellow card) 6', (goal) 19'; Marcone (yellow card) 50'; Mascarell (yellow card) 56'	Stadium: El Sadar; Attendance: 16,485; Referee: Isidro Díaz de Mera Escuderos

5 December 2021 16	Levante	0–0	Osasuna	Valencia
18:30 CET (UTC+1)	Radoja (yellow card) 34'; De Frutos (yellow card) 45'	Report	Vidal (yellow card) 54'; Brašanac (yellow card) 69'; Torró (yellow card) 90+4'	Stadium: Ciutat de València; Attendance: 15,361; Referee: Valentín Pizarro Gómez

12 December 2021 17	Osasuna	2–2	Barcelona	Pamplona
16:15 CET (UTC+1)	D. García 14', (yellow card) 67'; Vidal (yellow card) 28'; R. García (yellow card) 37'; Cruz (yellow card) 49'; Sánchez (yellow card) 56'; Ávila 86'	Report	González 12'; Ezzalzouli 49'; Gavi (yellow card) 74'; Ter Stegen (yellow card) 83'; Piqué (yellow card) 89'; Umtiti (yellow card) 90+6'	Stadium: El Sadar; Attendance: 21,427; Referee: Juan Martínez Munuera

19 December 2021 18	Getafe	1–0	Osasuna	Getafe
18:30 CET (UTC+1)	Sandro (yellow card) 26'; Suárez (yellow card) 45'; Djené (yellow card) 50'; Poveda 90+3'	Report	Ávila (yellow card) 72'	Stadium: Coliseum Alfonso Pérez; Attendance: 8,126; Referee: José Luis Munuera Montero

3 January 2022 19	Osasuna	1–3	Athletic Bilbao	Pamplona
21:00 CET (UTC+1)	Kike 10'; José Ángel (yellow card) 66'; Torró (yellow card) 76'; Herrera (yellow card) 78'; Ávila (yellow card) 90+2' (yellow-red card) 90+4'	Report	Sancet 16', 25', 68'; Yeray (yellow card) 66'; Martínez (yellow card) 90+4'	Stadium: El Sadar; Attendance: 16,206; Referee: Miguel Ángel Ortiz Arias

9 January 2022 20	Osasuna	2–0	Cádiz	Pamplona
18:30 CET (UTC+1)	Budimir 38'; Barja 48'; Cruz (yellow card) 55'; Torró (yellow card) 59'	Report	Arzamendia (yellow card) 55'; Andone (yellow card) 71'	Stadium: El Sadar; Attendance: 16,292; Referee: Ricardo De Burgos Bengoetxea

19 January 2022 21	Celta Vigo	2–0	Osasuna	Vigo
19:00 CET (UTC+1)	Mallo 29'; Galán (yellow card) 31'; Mina 38'	Report	Benito (yellow card) 84'; Vidal (yellow card) 90+2'	Stadium: Balaídos; Attendance: 8,837; Referee: Adrián Cordero Vega

23 January 2022 22	Granada	0–2	Osasuna	Granada
14:00 CET (UTC+1)		Report	Vidal (yellow card) 26'; D. García 64'; Brašanac (yellow card) 67'; Kike 90'	Stadium: Nuevo Los Cármenes; Attendance: 12,471; Referee: Santiago Jaime Latre

5 February 2022 23	Osasuna	0–0	Sevilla	Pamplona
21:00 CET (UTC+1)	Sánchez (yellow card) 56'	Report	Gudelj (yellow card) 33'; Rakitić (penalty missed) 90+2'	Stadium: El Sadar; Attendance: 17,635; Referee: Valentín Pizarro Gómez

12 February 2022 24	Rayo Vallecano	0–3	Osasuna	Madrid
18:30 CET (UTC+1)	Á. García (yellow card) 24'; Saveljich (yellow card) 34'	Report	Moncayola 8'; R. García 40'; Vidal (yellow card) 70'; Kike 90+3'	Stadium: Campo de Fútbol de Vallecas; Attendance: 8,596; Referee: Jorge Figueroa Vázquez

19 February 2022 25	Osasuna	0–3	Atlético Madrid	Pamplona
16:15 CET (UTC+1)	Ávila (yellow card) 34'	Report	Félix 3'; Vrsaljko (yellow card) 55'; Suárez 59'; Correa 89'; Serrano (yellow card) 90+1'	Stadium: El Sadar; Attendance: 20,040; Referee: Mario Melero López

27 February 2022 26	Real Sociedad	1–0	Osasuna	San Sebastián
18:30 CET (UTC+1)	Elustondo 52'	Report	Cruz (yellow card) 8'; Vidal (yellow card) 90+1'; José Ángel (yellow card) 90+6'; Torres (yellow card) 90+7'	Stadium: Anoeta; Attendance: 7,457; Referee: Antonio Mateu Lahoz

5 March 2022 27	Osasuna	1–0	Villarreal	Pamplona
14:00 CET (UTC+1)	Ávila 63', (yellow card) 74'	Report		Stadium: El Sadar; Attendance: 18,659; Referee: José Luis Munuera Montero

13 March 2022 28	Barcelona	4–0	Osasuna	Barcelona
21:00 CET (UTC+1)	Torres 14' (pen.), 21'; Aubameyang 27'; Puig 75'	Report	Vidal (yellow card) 13'; D. García (yellow card) 15'; U. García (yellow card) 89'; Brašanac (yellow card) 90+3'	Stadium: Camp Nou; Attendance: 54,507; Referee: Ricardo de Burgos Bengoetxea

19 March 2022 29	Osasuna	3–1	Levante	Pamplona
18:30 CET (UTC+1)	Ávila 44'; Budimir 57'; Brašanac 64'	Report	Pubill (yellow card) 47'; Roger 76'	Stadium: El Sadar; Attendance: 19,429; Referee: Javier Alberola Rojas

3 April 2022 30	Real Betis	4–1	Osasuna	Seville
16:15 CEST (UTC+2)	Juanmi 34', 45+1'; Carvalho (yellow card) 38', (goal) 82'; Moreno 88'	Report	Budimir 65'; José Ángel (yellow card) 82'; D. García (yellow card) 87'; Ávila (yellow card) 90+1'	Stadium: Benito Villamarín; Attendance: 49,103; Referee: Valentín Pizarro Gómez

10 April 2022 31	Osasuna	1–0	Alavés	Pamplona
14:00 CEST (UTC+2)	Vidal (yellow card) 9'; Budimir (yellow card) 29', (goal) 90+2'; R. García (penalty missed) 37'; Torró (yellow card) 45+3'	Report	Loum (yellow card) 15'	Stadium: El Sadar; Attendance: 19,220; Referee: Alejandro Muñiz Ruiz

16 April 2022 32	Valencia	1–2	Osasuna	Valencia
18:30 CEST (UTC+2)	Foulquier (yellow card) 28'; Soler 83' (pen.); Gayà (yellow card) 90+8'	Report	Oier (yellow card) 17'; Torró (yellow card) 23'; Ávila 50' (pen.); Budimir 74'	Stadium: Mestalla; Attendance: 30,148; Referee: Mario Melero López

20 April 2022 33	Osasuna	1–3	Real Madrid	Pamplona
21:30 CEST (UTC+2)	Budimir 13'; Brašanac (yellow card) 44'	Report	Camavinga (yellow card) 5'; Alaba 12'; Asensio 45'; Benzema (penalty missed) 52', 59; Militão (yellow card) 60'; Nacho (yellow card) 62'; Vázquez 90+6'	Stadium: El Sadar; Attendance: 21,360; Referee: Ricardo de Burgos Bengoetxea

1 May 2022 34	Elche	1–1	Osasuna	Elche
14:00 CEST (UTC+2)	Fidel (yellow card) 36'; Roco (yellow card) 41'; Mascarell (yellow card) 43'; Milla 84'; Carrillo (yellow card) 90'	Report	Budimir (yellow card) 44', (goal) 67' (pen.); Cruz (yellow card) 64'	Stadium: Estadio Manuel Martínez Valero; Attendance: 16,305; Referee: Carlos del Cerro Grande

8 May 2022 35	Espanyol	1–1	Osasuna	Cornellà de Llobregat
18:30 CEST (UTC+2)	Vilhena (yellow card) 28'; Melamed 67'	Report	Barja 42', (yellow card) 53'; Brašanac (yellow card) 62'; Sánchez (yellow card) 76'	Stadium: RCDE Stadium; Attendance: 18,903; Referee: Santiago Jaime Latre

11 May 2022 36	Osasuna	1–1	Getafe	Pamplona
19:00 CEST (UTC+2)	Oier 9'; Ávila (yellow card) 14'; Kike (yellow card) 38'	Report	Torró 20' (o.g.); Cuenca (yellow card) 45+2'; Mitrović (yellow card) 72' (yellow-red card) 89'; Arambarri (yellow card) 79'; Soria (yellow card) 81'	Stadium: El Sadar; Attendance: 17,850; Referee: Alejandro Muñiz Ruiz

15 May 2022 37	Athletic Bilbao	2–0	Osasuna	Bilbao
19:30 CEST (UTC+2)	Berenguer 33'; Villalibre 79'	Report		Stadium: San Mamés; Attendance: 37,869; Referee: Jorge Figueroa Vázquez

22 May 2022 38	Osasuna	0–2	Mallorca	Pamplona
20:00 CEST (UTC+2)	Brašanac (yellow card) 62'; U. García (yellow card) 85'	Report	Ángel 47'; Grenier 83'; Reina (yellow card) 89'; Maffeo (yellow card) 90'	Stadium: El Sadar; Attendance: 18,717; Referee: César Soto Grado

=== Copa del Rey ===
2 December 2021 First round	San Agustín del Guadalix	0–4	Osasuna	San Agustín del Guadalix
19:00 CET (UTC+1)	Álvarez (yellow card) 28'	Report	Barbero 50'; Torres 61'; Ontiveros 72'; Ávila 90+1'	Stadium: Campo de Fútbol San Agustín del Guadalix; Referee: Santiago Jaime Latre

16 December 2021 Second round	Deportivo La Coruña	1–2	Osasuna	A Coruña
21:00 CET (UTC+1)	Doncel 23'; Granero (yellow card) 88'	Report	D. García (yellow card) 29'; Kike 45+3'; Budimir 64'	Stadium: Riazor; Referee: Adrián Cordero Vega

6 January 2022 Round of 32	Girona	1–0	Osasuna	Girona
16:00 CET (UTC+1)	Juncà 6'	Report	U. García (yellow card) 79'; Moncayola (yellow card) 83'	Stadium: Montilivi; Referee: Javier Alberola Rojas

== Statistics ==
=== Appearances and goals ===
Last updated 22 May 2022

No.	Pos	Nat	Player	Total		La Liga		Copa del Rey	
No.	Pos	Nat	Player	Apps	Goals	Apps	Goals	Apps	Goals
Goalkeepers
1	GK	(Spain) ESP	Sergio Herrera	37	0	36	0	1	0
13	GK	(Spain) ESP	Juan Pérez	3	0	2	0	1	0
36	GK	(Spain) ESP	Darío	1	0	0	0	1	0
Defenders
2	DF	(Spain) ESP	Nacho Vidal	37	0	33+2	0	0+2	0
3	DF	(Spain) ESP	Juan Cruz	25	0	22+1	0	2	0
4	DF	(Spain) ESP	Unai García	19	0	15+3	0	1	0
5	DF	(Spain) ESP	David García	36	4	35	4	1	0
15	DF	(Angola) ANG	Jonás Ramalho	6	0	3	0	3	0
16	DF	(Spain) ESP	Cote	25	1	12+11	1	1+1	0
23	DF	(Spain) ESP	Aridane	16	0	12+3	0	1	0
31	DF	(Spain) ESP	Unai Dufur	1	0	1	0	0	0
32	DF	(Spain) ESP	Jesús Areso	4	0	2+1	0	1	0
39	DF	(Spain) ESP	Manu Sánchez	34	1	25+8	1	1	0
Midfielders
6	MF	(Spain) ESP	Oier	28	1	8+17	1	2+1	0
7	MF	(Spain) ESP	Jon Moncayola	38	2	33+3	2	0+2	0
8	MF	(Serbia) SRB	Darko Brašanac	36	1	27+8	1	0+1	0
10	MF	(Spain) ESP	Roberto Torres	31	3	6+22	2	3	1
11	MF	(Spain) ESP	Kike Barja	24	2	9+12	2	1+2	0
14	MF	(Spain) ESP	Rubén García	38	1	30+7	1	0+1	0
21	MF	(Spain) ESP	Iñigo Pérez	12	1	4+6	1	2	0
24	MF	(Spain) ESP	Lucas Torró	33	1	32+1	1	0	0
28	MF	(Spain) ESP	Javi Martínez	29	1	9+17	1	3	0
Forwards
9	FW	(Argentina) ARG	Chimy Ávila	38	7	22+14	6	1+1	1
17	FW	(Croatia) CRO	Ante Budimir	30	9	20+8	8	1+1	1
18	FW	(Spain) ESP	Kike García	36	6	18+15	5	1+2	1
20	FW	(Spain) ESP	Iván Barbero	7	1	0+6	0	1	1
33	FW	(Spain) ESP	Iker Benito	4	0	1+3	0	0	0
Players who have made an appearance or had a squad number this season but have been loaned out or transferred
12	MF	(Spain) ESP	Jaume Grau	3	0	0+1	0	2	0
19	MF	(Spain) ESP	Javier Ontiveros	5	1	0+3	0	2	1
22	MF	(Spain) ESP	Robert Ibáñez	5	0	1+3	0	0+1	0

=== Goalscorers ===
As of 20 April 2022

Rank	Player	La Liga	Copa del Rey	Total
1	(Croatia) Ante Budimir	7	1	8
2	(Argentina) Ezequiel Ávila	6	1	7
3	(Spain) Kike García	5	1	6
4	(Spain) David García	4	0	4
5	(Spain) Roberto Torres	2	1	3
6	(Spain) Jon Moncayola	2	0	2
7	(Spain) José Ángel	1	0	1
7	(Spain) Iván Barbero	0	1	1
7	(Spain) Kike Barja	1	0	1
7	(Spain) Rubén García	1	0	1
7	(Spain) Javi Martínez	1	0	1
7	(Spain) Javier Ontiveros	0	1	1
7	(Spain) Iñigo Pérez	1	0	1
7	(Spain) Manu Sánchez	1	0	1
7	(Spain) Lucas Torró	1	0	1
Own goals		1	0	1
Total		34	6	40
