= Iker Benito =

Spanish footballer

Personal information
- Full name: Iker Benito Sánchez
- Date of birth: 10 August 2002 (age 24)
- Place of birth: Miranda de Ebro, Spain
- Height: 1.76 m (5 ft 9 in)
- Position: Right winger

Team information
- Current team: Querétaro
- Number: 7

Youth career
- Pamplona
- 2018–2020: Osasuna

Senior career*
Years	Team	Apps	(Gls)
2020–2023	Osasuna B	80	(8)
2022–2026	Osasuna	16	(1)
2023–2024	→ Andorra (loan)	38	(2)
2025	→ Mirandés (loan)	25	(1)
2026–	Querétaro	4	(1)
- * Club domestic league appearances and goals as of 21 September 2026

Iker Benito Sánchez (born 10 August 2002) is a Spanish professional footballer who plays as a right winger for Liga MX club Querétaro.

== Club career ==
Benito was in Miranda de Ebro, Burgos, Castile and León.

=== Osasuna ===
Benito joined CA Osasuna's youth setup in 2018, after a period on trial at Athletic Bilbao, from CD Pamplona. On 13 May of the following year, he signed a two-year professional contract with the former club, with an option for a further two campaigns.

Benito was promoted to the reserves in May 2020, and made his senior debut on 25 October, coming on as a second-half substitute in a 2–0 Segunda División B away loss against CD Tudelano. He scored his first senior goal on 25 September 2021, netting the B's second in a 2–0 away win over AD San Juan in the Segunda División RFEF championship.

Benito made his first team – and La Liga – debut on 19 January 2022, replacing fellow youth graduate Kike Barja late into a 2–0 loss at RC Celta de Vigo. On 24 June, he renewed his contract until 2025.

==== Loans to Andorra and Mirandés ====
On 1 July 2023, Benito was loaned to Segunda División side FC Andorra for the season. He returned to the Rojillos roughly one year later, but moved to CD Mirandés also in a temporary deal on 2 January 2025, after being rarely used.

=== Querétaro ===
On 14 August 2026, Benito joined Liga MX side Querétaro.

== Career statistics ==
=== Club ===
As of 12 March 2026

Appearances and goals by club, season and competition
Club	Season	League			National cup (Note: Includes Copa del Rey)		Continental		Other		Total	
Club	Season	Division	Apps	Goals	Apps	Goals	Apps	Goals	Apps	Goals	Apps	Goals
Osasuna B	2020–21	Primera Federación	14	0	—		—		6 (Note: Appearances in Primera División RFEF Promotion Playoffs)	0	20	0
Osasuna B	2021–22	Segunda Federación	28	5	—		—		—		28	5
Osasuna B	2022–23	Primera Federación	32	3	—		—		—		32	3
Osasuna B	Total		74	8	—		—		6	0	80	8
Osasuna	2021–22	La Liga	4	0	—		—		—		4	0
Osasuna	2022–23	La Liga	4	0	—		—		—		4	0
Osasuna	2024–25	La Liga	2	0	2	1	—		—		4	1
Osasuna	2025–26	La Liga	5	1	1	0	—		—		6	1
Osasuna	Career total		15	1	3	1	—		—		18	1
Andorra (loan)	2023–24	Segunda División	38	2	1	0	—		—		39	2
Mirandés (loan)	2024–25	Segunda División	21	1	—		—		4 (Note: Appearances in La Liga Promotion Playoffs)	0	25	1
Career total			148	12	4	1	0	0	10	0	162	13
