= Juan Cruz (footballer, born 1992) =

Spanish footballer

Personal information
- Full name: Álvaro Juan Cruz Armada
- Date of birth: 28 July 1992 (age 34)
- Place of birth: Madrid, Spain
- Height: 1.80 m (5 ft 11 in)
- Positions: Left-back; centre-back

Team information
- Current team: Oviedo

Youth career
- Las Rozas
- Atlético Madrid
- 2010–2012: Bologna

Senior career*
Years	Team	Apps	(Gls)
2012–2013	Bologna	0	(0)
2012–2013	→ Carrarese (loan)	15	(0)
2013–2015	San Marino	55	(6)
2015–2016	Pistoiese	10	(0)
2016–2017	SS Reyes	26	(0)
2017–2018	Rayo Majadahonda	34	(1)
2018–2020	Elche	69	(1)
2020–2026	Osasuna	142	(0)
2026–	Oviedo	0	(0)
- * Club domestic league appearances and goals as of 30 May 2026

Álvaro Juan Cruz Armada (born 28 July 1992) is a Spanish professional footballer who plays as a left-back or centre-back for Real Oviedo.

== Career ==
Born in Madrid, Cruz was an Atlético Madrid youth graduate before joining Italian Serie A side Bologna F.C. 1909 on 30 August 2010. After spending two full seasons with the Primavera side, he was loaned to Carrarese Calcio on 26 July 2012.

On 10 July 2013, Cruz joined San Marino Calcio. In 2015, after two years as a starter, he moved to fellow Lega Pro side U.S. Pistoiese 1921.

On 19 August 2016, Cruz returned to Spain after agreeing to a contract with Segunda División B side UD San Sebastián de los Reyes. The following 22 July he moved to fellow league team CF Rayo Majadahonda, being a regular starter as his side achieved promotion to Segunda División for the first time ever.

On 10 July 2018, free agent Cruz signed for Elche CF in the second division. He immediately became a starter for the side, contributing with one goal and 39 appearances (play-offs included) during the 2019–20 season, as his side achieved promotion to La Liga.

On 30 August 2020, Cruz joined top tier side CA Osasuna on a three-year contract, for a fee of €2.75 million. He made his debut in the category at the age of 28 on 12 September, starting in a 2–0 away win over Cádiz CF.

Initially a first-choice, Cruz subsequently saw his playing time diminish over the seasons, and left the club on 26 May 2026, after 164 official matches. On 24 July, he was announced at second division side Real Oviedo on a two-year deal.

== Career statistics ==
As of match played 12 March 2026

Appearances and goals by club, season and competition
Club	Season	League			National Cup (Note: Includes Coppa Italia, Copa del Rey)		Continental		Other		Total	
Club	Season	Division	Apps	Goals	Apps	Goals	Apps	Goals	Apps	Goals	Apps	Goals
Bologna	2010–11	Serie A	0	0	1	0	—		—		1	0
Carrarese (loan)	2012–13	Lega Pro Prima Divisione	15	0	2	0	—		—		17	0
San Marino	2013–14	Lega Pro Prima Divisione	22	1	—		—		2 (Note: Appearance(s) in Coppa Italia Serie C)	0	24	1
San Marino	2014–15	Lega Pro	33	5	—		—		—		33	5
San Marino	Total		55	6	0	0	0	0	2	0	57	6
Pistoiese	2015–16	Lega Pro	10	0	0	0	—		2	0	12	0
SS Reyes	2016–17	Segunda División B	26	0	0	0	—		2 (Note: Appearance(s) in Relegation Playoffs)	0	28	0
Rayo Majadahonda	2017–18	Segunda División B	34	1	1	0	—		2 (Note: Appearance(s) in Promotion Playoffs)	0	37	1
Elche	2018–19	Segunda División	34	0	2	0	—		—		36	0
Elche	2019–20	Segunda División	35	1	0	0	—		4	0	39	1
Elche	Total		69	1	2	0	0	0	4	0	75	1
Osasuna	2020–21	La Liga	26	0	2	0	—		—		28	0
Osasuna	2021–22	La Liga	23	0	2	0	—		—		25	0
Osasuna	2022–23	La Liga	27	0	6	0	—		—		33	0
Osasuna	2023–24	La Liga	26	0	2	0	1 (Note: Appearance(s) in UEFA Conference League Qualifiers)	0	1 (Note: Appearance(s) in Supercopa de España)	0	30	0
Osasuna	2024–25	La Liga	25	0	4	0	—		—		29	0
Osasuna	2025–26	La Liga	14	0	4	0	—		—		18	0
Osasuna	Total		141	0	20	0	1	0	1	0	163	0
Career total			350	7	26	0	1	0	24	0	401	7

== Honours ==
Osasuna

- Copa del Rey: runner-up 2022–23
