= Manu Sánchez (footballer, born 2000) =

Spanish footballer

Personal information
- Full name: Manuel Sánchez de la Peña
- Date of birth: 24 August 2000 (age 26)
- Place of birth: Madrid, Spain
- Height: 1.79 m (5 ft 10 in)
- Position: Left-back

Team information
- Current team: Levante (on loan from Celta)
- Number: 23

Youth career
- Cornellà
- 2014–2019: Atlético Madrid

Senior career*
Years	Team	Apps	(Gls)
2019–2020	Atlético Madrid B	29	(0)
2019–2023	Atlético Madrid	6	(0)
2021–2023	→ Osasuna (loan)	80	(1)
2023–	Celta	26	(0)
2024–2025	→ Alavés (loan)	33	(1)
2025–	→ Levante (loan)	33	(1)

International career^{‡}
2020–2023	Spain U21	10	(3)
Medal record
Men's football
Representing Spain
UEFA European Under-21 Championship
Runner-up	2023 Georgia–Romania
- * Club domestic league appearances and goals as of 27 May 2026 ‡ National team caps and goals as of 27 June 2023

Manuel "Manu" Sánchez de la Peña (born 24 August 2000) is a Spanish professional footballer who plays as a left-back for Levante UD, on loan from RC Celta de Vigo.

== Club career ==
Sánchez was born in Madrid, and joined Atlético Madrid's youth setup in 2014, from UE Cornellà. He made his senior debut with the reserves on 30 March 2019, starting in a 2–0 Segunda División B away win against Salamanca CF UDS.

On 30 August 2019, Sánchez renewed his contract with Atleti until 2023. He made his first team – and La Liga – debut on 14 December, starting in a 2–0 home defeat of CA Osasuna.

On 7 September 2020, Sánchez further extended his contract until 2025. The following 11 January, he moved to fellow top tier side Osasuna on loan for the remainder of the season.

On 17 August 2021, Sánchez returned to Osasuna on loan for the 2021–22 campaign. On 27 July 2022, the loan was extended for an additional year.

On 3 July 2023, Sánchez signed a five-year contract with RC Celta de Vigo also in the top tier. On 23 July of the following year, he was loaned to fellow league team Deportivo Alavés for the season.

On 25 July 2025, Sánchez moved to Levante UD, newly-promoted to the top tier, on a one-year loan deal. On 21 July of the following year, his loan was extended for a further season.

== Career statistics ==
As of match played on 28 May 2023

Appearances and goals by club, season and competition
Club	Season	League			National cup		Continental		Other		Total	
Club	Season	Division	Apps	Goals	Apps	Goals	Apps	Goals	Apps	Goals	Apps	Goals
Atlético Madrid B	2018–19	Segunda División B	6	0	—		—		—		6	0
Atlético Madrid B	2019–20	Segunda División B	23	0	—		—		1 (Note: Appearance(s) in Promotion Playoffs)	0	24	0
Atlético Madrid B	Total		29	0	—		—		1	0	30	0
Atlético Madrid	2019–20	La Liga	5	0	1	0	0	0	0	0	6	0
Atlético Madrid	2020–21	La Liga	1	0	0	0	0	0	—		1	0
Atlético Madrid	Total		6	0	1	0	0	0	0	0	7	0
Osasuna (loan)	2020–21	La Liga	16	0	2	0	—		—		18	0
Osasuna (loan)	2021–22	La Liga	33	1	1	0	—		—		34	1
Osasuna (loan)	2022–23	La Liga	30	0	5	0	—		—		35	0
Osasuna (loan)	Total		79	1	8	0	0	0	0	0	77	1
Career total			114	1	9	0	0	0	1	0	124	1

== Honours ==
Osasuna

- Copa del Rey: runner-up 2022–23

Spain U21

- UEFA European Under-21 Championship runner-up: 2023
