= Sergio Herrera (footballer, born 1993) =

Spanish footballer

Personal information
- Full name: Sergio Herrera Pirón
- Date of birth: 5 June 1993 (age 33)
- Place of birth: Miranda de Ebro, Spain
- Height: 1.92 m (6 ft 4 in)
- Position: Goalkeeper

Team information
- Current team: Osasuna
- Number: 1

Youth career
- 2007–2011: Alavés

Senior career*
Years	Team	Apps	(Gls)
2011–2015	Alavés B	45	(0)
2012–2014	Alavés	1	(0)
2013–2014	→ Laudio (loan)	14	(0)
2015–2016	Amorebieta	31	(0)
2016–2017	Huesca	41	(0)
2017–	Osasuna	258	(0)
- * Club domestic league appearances and goals as of 31 August 2026

Sergio Herrera Pirón (born 5 June 1993) is a Spanish professional footballer who plays for La Liga club Osasuna as a goalkeeper.

== Career ==
Born in Miranda de Ebro, Burgos, Castile and León, Herrera finished his graduation with Deportivo Alavés' youth setup, and made his senior debuts with the reserves in the 2011–12 campaign, in Tercera División. On 28 November 2012, he made his first team debut, starting in a 3–1 Copa del Rey away defeat against FC Barcelona.

Herrera appeared in only one further match with the main squad (who achieved promotion to Segunda División) before being loaned out to CD Laudio on 23 July 2013. Upon his return, he was again assigned to the B-team in the fourth level.

On 2 July 2015, Herrera signed for SD Amorebieta in Segunda División B. On 22 June of the following year, after being a regular starter, he signed a three-year contract with SD Huesca in the second tier.

On 20 August 2016, Herrera made his professional debut, starting and keeping a clean sheet in a 0–0 away draw against AD Alcorcón. He became an undisputed starter for the club, overtaking new signings Javi Jiménez (who was also injured) and Queco Piña.

On 12 July 2017, Herrera signed a four-year deal with CA Osasuna, freshly relegated from La Liga, for a fee of € 300,000. He spent the first half of the 2018–19 campaign nursing a knee injury, and contributed rarely to his team's return to the top tier.

On December 8, 2021, his renewal was announced until 2026. His release clause amounts to €14,000,000.

On 19 January 2025, Herrera made a crucial save to keep out Isi Palazón's long-range shot in a league match against Rayo Vallecano that earned him the La Liga Save of the Month award for January.

== Career statistics ==
As of match played 31 August 2026

Appearances and goals by club, season and competition
Club	Season	League			National cup		Europe		Other		Total	
Club	Season	Division	Apps	Goals	Apps	Goals	Apps	Goals	Apps	Goals	Apps	Goals
Alavés	2012–13	Segunda División B	1	0	1	0	—		—		2	0
Laudio (loan)	2013–14	Segunda División B	14	0	1	0	—		—		15	0
Amorebieta	2015–16	Segunda División B	31	0	0	0	—		—		31	0
Huesca	2016–17	Segunda División	41	0	0	0	—		2 (Note: Appearance(s) in Promotion Playoffs)	0	43	0
Osasuna	2017–18	Segunda División	40	0	0	0	—		—		40	0
Osasuna	2018–19	Segunda División	4	0	0	0	—		—		4	0
Osasuna	2019–20	La Liga	19	0	0	0	—		—		19	0
Osasuna	2020–21	La Liga	33	0	0	0	—		—		33	0
Osasuna	2021–22	La Liga	36	0	1	0	—		—		37	0
Osasuna	2022–23	La Liga	17	0	7	0	—		—		24	0
Osasuna	2023–24	La Liga	32	0	0	0	1 (Note: Appearance(s) in UEFA Europa Conference League)	0	1 (Note: Appearance(s) in Supercopa de España)	0	34	0
Osasuna	2024–25	La Liga	37	0	2	0	—		—		39	0
Osasuna	2025–26	La Liga	37	0	0	0	—		—		37	0
Osasuna	2026–27	La Liga	3	0	0	0	—		—		3	0
Osasuna	Total		258	0	10	0	1	0	1	0	270	0
Career total			345	0	12	0	1	0	3	0	361	0

== Honours ==
Alaves

- Segunda División B: 2012–13

Osasuna

- Segunda División: 2018–19
- Copa del Rey: runner-up 2022–23

Individual

- La Liga Save of the Month: January 2025, September 2025
