= Chimy Ávila =

Argentine footballer

Personal information
- Full name: Luis Ezequiel Ávila
- Date of birth: 6 February 1994 (age 32)
- Place of birth: Rosario, Argentina
- Height: 1.72 m (5 ft 8 in)
- Position: Forward

Team information
- Current team: Independiente
- Number: 6

Youth career
- –2010: Tiro Federal
- 2010: → Espanyol (loan)

Senior career*
Years	Team	Apps	(Gls)
2010–2013	Tiro Federal	58	(7)
2015–2019	San Lorenzo	20	(1)
2017–2019	→ Huesca (loan)	69	(17)
2019–2024	Osasuna	110	(24)
2024–2026	Betis	41	(4)
2026–	Independiente	4	(0)
- * Club domestic league appearances and goals as of 08:12, 08 October 2026 (UTC)

Luis Ezequiel "Chimy" Ávila (born 6 February 1994) is an Argentine professional footballer who plays as a forward for Independiente.

== Club career ==
=== Tiro Federal ===
Born in Rosario, Santa Fe, Ávila played for Tiro Federal as a youth, also having a short spell at RCD Espanyol in 2010. He made his first team debut for the former on 18 October 2010 at the age of just 16, coming on as a second-half substitute for Gastón Meinicocci in a 0–2 Primera B Nacional away loss against Almirante Brown.

Ávila scored his first goal on 11 June 2011, netting his team's second in a 3–1 away win over Ferro Carril Oeste, as his side was already relegated. He did not establish himself as a regular starter for the side in the following seasons, as the club competed in the Torneo Argentino A.

In February 2013, Ávila was dismissed by the club after being accused of theft. He stayed nearly two years without playing football, working as a bricklayer. He was declared innocent only in 2018.

=== San Lorenzo ===
On 3 February 2015, Ávila signed a three-year contract with San Lorenzo. He made his club – and Primera División – debut on 19 April, replacing Matías Catalán in a 0–1 away loss against Aldosivi.

Ávila scored his first goal for Ciclón on 25 March 2017, netting his team's second in a 3–0 home win against Quilmes.

==== Huesca (loan) ====
On 1 August 2017, Ávila was loaned to Spanish Segunda División side SD Huesca for the season. He scored seven goals in 35 appearances as his side achieved promotion to La Liga, and had his loan extended for a further year on 16 June 2018.

Ávila made his debut in the Spanish top tier on 19 August 2018, replacing goalscorer Álex Gallar in a 2–1 away win against SD Eibar. Eight days later, he scored the equalizer in a 2–2 draw at Athletic Bilbao.

On 9 February 2019, Ávila scored a brace in a 2–0 away success over Girona FC. He scored ten times during the campaign, but could not prevent his side's relegation.

=== Osasuna ===
On 27 June 2019, CA Osasuna reached an agreement with San Lorenzo for the transfer of Ávila. He signed a four-year contract, for a fee of € 2.7 million. On his debut for the club on 17 August, he scored the game's only in an away success over CD Leganés.

In January 2020, Ávila suffered an injury on his left knee, being sidelined for the remainder of the season. In September, after being close to a return, he suffered the same injury on his right knee.

Ávila returned from injury in March 2021, and played his first match after 435 days sidelined on 3 April, a 0–0 home draw against Getafe CF.

=== Betis ===
On 1 February 2024, Ávila signed a three-and-a-half-year contract with fellow top-tier side Real Betis, for a fee of €4 million plus variables.

== Personal life ==
Ávila is the brother of the footballer Gastón Ávila. He grew up supporting his local club Rosario Central and he tattooed its crest onto his body. His nickname "Chimy" came from the word chimichurri, an Argentine sauce. He gained a Spanish passport in 2022.

== Career statistics ==
As of match played 23 May 2026

Appearances and goals by club, season and competition
Club	Season	League			National cup (Note: Includes Copa Argentina, Copa del Rey)		Continental		Total	
Club	Season	Division	Apps	Goals	Apps	Goals	Apps	Goals	Apps	Goals
Tiro Federal	2010–11	Primera Nacional	17	1	0	0	—		17	1
Tiro Federal	2011–12	Torneo Argentino A	19	2	0	0	—		19	2
Tiro Federal	2012–13	Torneo Argentino A	16	4	1	0	—		17	4
Tiro Federal	2013–14	Torneo Argentino A	6	0	0	0	—		6	0
Tiro Federal	Total		58	7	1	0	—		59	7
San Lorenzo	2015	Primera División	4	0	1	0	1 (Note: Appearance(s) in Copa Libertadores)	0	6	0
San Lorenzo	2016	Primera División	1	0	1	0	3 (Note: One appearance in Copa Libertadores, two appearances in Copa Sudamericana)	1	5	1
San Lorenzo	2016-17	Primera División	15	1	0	0	4	0	19	1
San Lorenzo	Total		20	1	2	0	8	1	30	2
Huesca (loan)	2017–18	Segunda División	35	7	0	0	—		35	7
Huesca (loan)	2018–19	La Liga	34	10	2	0	—		36	10
Huesca (loan)	Total		69	17	2	0	—		71	17
Osasuna	2019–20	La Liga	20	9	2	2	—		22	11
Osasuna	2020–21	La Liga	8	0	0	0	—		8	0
Osasuna	2021–22	La Liga	36	6	2	1	—		38	7
Osasuna	2022–23	La Liga	29	8	7	1	—		36	9
Osasuna	2023–24	La Liga	17	1	0	0	2 (Note: Appearances in UEFA Europa Conference League)	1	19	2
Osasuna	Total		110	24	11	4	2	1	123	29
Real Betis	2023–24	La Liga	6	1	0	0	0	0	6	1
Real Betis	2024–25	La Liga	19	2	2	1	11	1	32	4
Real Betis	2025–26	La Liga	16	1	5	2	9 (Note: Appearances in UEFA Europa League)	0	30	3
Real Betis	Total		41	4	7	3	20	1	68	8
Career total			298	53	23	7	30	3	351	63

== Honours ==
Osasuna

- Copa del Rey: runner-up 2022–23

Betis

- UEFA Conference League runner-up: 2024–25
