= Nacho Vidal (footballer) =

Spanish footballer (born 1995)

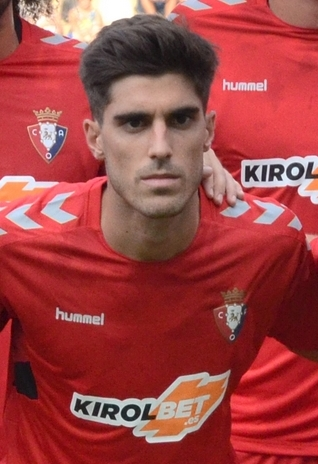
- Vidal with Osasuna in 2018

Personal information
- Full name: Ignacio Vidal Miralles
- Date of birth: 24 January 1995 (age 31)
- Place of birth: El Campello, Spain
- Height: 1.80 m (5 ft 11 in)
- Position: Right-back

Team information
- Current team: Oviedo
- Number: 22

Youth career
- 2002–2005: El Campello
- 2005–2009: Hércules
- 2009–2014: Valencia

Senior career*
Years	Team	Apps	(Gls)
2014–2017	Valencia B	70	(3)
2017–2018	Valencia	7	(1)
2018–2025	Osasuna	169	(1)
2024	→ Mallorca (loan)	8	(0)
2025–	Oviedo	47	(4)

International career
2012	Spain U17	2	(0)
2013	Spain U18	1	(0)
- * Club domestic league appearances and goals as of 20:00, 6 August 2026 (UTC)

Ignacio "Nacho" Vidal Miralles (born 24 January 1995) is a Spanish professional footballer who plays as a right-back for Segunda División club Real Oviedo.

== Club career ==
=== Valencia ===
Born in El Campello, Alicante, Valencian Community, Vidal joined Valencia CF's youth academy in 2009 from Hércules CF. He made his debut as a senior with the reserves on 23 March 2014, coming on as a second-half substitute for José Gayà in a 2–0 away loss to Atlético Levante UD in the Segunda División B.

Vidal scored his first senior goal on 14 January 2017, his team's second in the 2–1 home win against RCD Espanyol B. He featured in 42 matches during the season, as his team missed out on promotion in the play-offs. On 4 May, he renewed his contract until 2020.

On 18 August 2017, Vidal made his first-team – and La Liga – debut, starting in a 1–0 home victory over UD Las Palmas. He scored his first goal in the competition on 24 September, helping to beat hosts Real Sociedad 3–2.

=== Osasuna ===
On 13 July 2018, Vidal signed a four-year deal with Segunda División club CA Osasuna, with Valencia retaining 50% of his federative rights. He played 38 games in his debut campaign, adding five assists in a return to the top tier as champions.

On 26 January 2024, after losing his starting spot to Jesús Areso, Vidal moved to fellow top-flight RCD Mallorca on loan for the remainder of the season. Upon returning, he was again a backup before terminating his contract on 22 January 2025.

=== Oviedo ===
Hours after leaving Osasuna, Vidal signed a two-and-a-half-year deal with Real Oviedo in the second division. He scored a career-best six goals in his first season, with his side returning to the main tier after a 24-year absence via the playoffs.

== Career statistics ==
As of match played 26 May 2024

Appearances and goals by club, season and competition
Club	Season	League			National cup		Continental		Other		Total	
Club	Season	Division	Apps	Goals	Apps	Goals	Apps	Goals	Apps	Goals	Apps	Goals
Valencia B	2013–14	Segunda División B	1	0	—		—		—		1	0
Valencia B	2014–15	Segunda División B	19	0	—		—		—		19	0
Valencia B	2015–16	Segunda División B	14	0	—		—		—		14	0
Valencia B	2016–17	Segunda División B	36	3	—		—		6 (Note: Appearances in Segunda División B play-offs)	1	42	4
Valencia B	Total		70	3	0	0	0	0	6	1	76	4
Valencia	2016–17	La Liga	0	0	0	0	—		—		0	0
Valencia	2017–18	La Liga	7	1	2	0	—		—		9	1
Valencia	Total		7	1	2	0	0	0	0	0	9	1
Osasuna	2018–19	Segunda División	38	0	0	0	—		—		38	0
Osasuna	2019–20	La Liga	30	0	3	1	—		—		33	1
Osasuna	2020–21	La Liga	34	0	3	0	—		—		37	0
Osasuna	2021–22	La Liga	35	0	2	0	—		—		37	0
Osasuna	2022–23	La Liga	20	0	2	1	—		—		22	1
Osasuna	2023–24	La Liga	7	1	1	0	0	0	0	0	8	1
Osasuna	Total		164	1	9	2	0	0	0	0	173	3
Mallorca (loan)	2023–24	La Liga	8	0	0	0	—		—		8	0
Career total			249	5	11	2	0	0	6	1	266	8

== Honours ==
Osasuna

- Segunda División: 2018–19
