= Jon Moncayola =

Spanish footballer (born 1998)

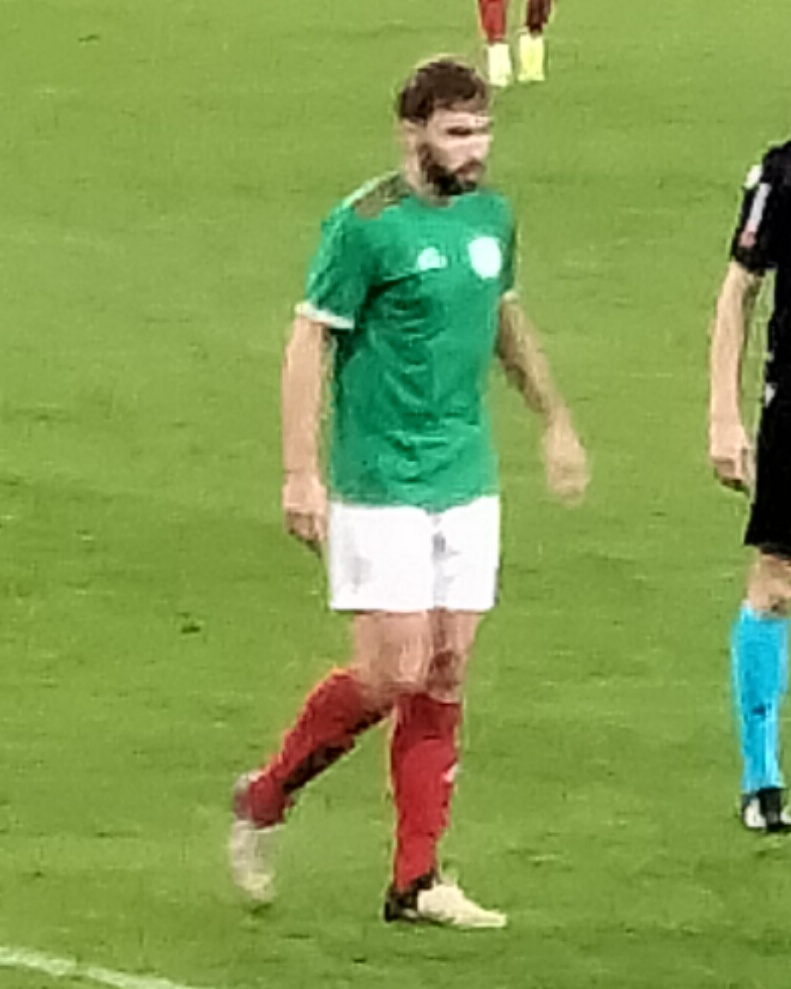

Personal information
- Full name: Jon Moncayola Tollar
- Date of birth: 13 May 1998 (age 28)
- Place of birth: Garínoain, Spain
- Height: 1.89 m (6 ft 2 in)
- Positions: Midfielder; right-back

Team information
- Current team: Osasuna
- Number: 7

Youth career
- 2008–2017: Osasuna

Senior career*
Years	Team	Apps	(Gls)
2017–2018	Iruña	16	(0)
2017–2019	Osasuna B	55	(5)
2019–	Osasuna	237	(7)

International career^{‡}
2020–2021	Spain U21	7	(1)
2021	Spain U23	6	(0)
2024–	Basque Country	1	(0)
Medal record
Men's football
Representing Spain
Olympic Games
Silver medal – second place	2020	Team
- * Club domestic league appearances and goals as of 27 May 2026 ‡ National team caps and goals as of 24 March 2024

Jon Moncayola Tollar (born 13 May 1998) is a Spanish professional footballer who plays as a midfielder or right-back for La Liga club Osasuna.

== Club career ==
Moncayola was born in Garínoain, Navarre, and was a CA Osasuna youth graduate having joined the club aged 10. Not initially marked out as a top prospect, he made his senior debut with the farm team in the 2017–18 season, in Tercera División; during that campaign he also appeared with the reserves in Segunda División B, and spent the next season with them but at the lower Tercera level following relegation – they regained their Segunda B status at the first attempt.

On 3 June 2019, Moncayola renewed his contract with the Pamplona club until 2021. He made his professional – and La Liga – debut on 17 August 2019, starting in a 1–0 away defeat of CD Leganés.

On 28 November 2019, Moncayola further extended his contract until 2024, and scored his first professional goal three days later, netting his team's third in a 4–2 away defeat of RCD Espanyol.

On 8 June 2021, Moncayola signed a new ten-year contract with Osasuna, running until June 2031. Osasuna also confirmed that his release clause would be €22m (£18.9m) for the next two seasons, before being reduced to €20m for the eight following campaigns, and €8m if the club was relegated. In the 2021-22 season, he gained more experience with the red team, becoming the second player with the most minutes played on the squad.

== International career ==
On September 3, 2020, he made his debut with the Spanish under-21 team in a friendly match for the President of Spain against the North Macedonia national team. Moncayola featured in all three of Spain's U-21 group stage fixtures at the European Championship in March 2021. He missed the knock-out stage of the tournament in May 2021 due to testing positive for COVID-19.

In July 2021, he was called up to play in the Tokyo Olympics. In that tournament, he played four matches, coming on as a substitute.

== Career statistics ==
As of match played 31 May 2026

Appearances and goals by club, season and competition
Club	Season	League			National cup		Europe		Other		Total	
Club	Season	Division	Apps	Goals	Apps	Goals	Apps	Goals	Apps	Goals	Apps	Goals
Osasuna B	2017–18	Segunda División B	21	1	—		—		—		21	1
Osasuna B	2018–19	Tercera División	32	4	—		—		2 (Note: Appearance(s) in promotion playoffs)	0	32	4
Osasuna B	Total		53	5	—		—		2	0	55	5
Osasuna	2018–19	Segunda División	0	0	0	0	—		—		0	0
Osasuna	2019–20	La Liga	27	1	4	0	—		—		31	1
Osasuna	2020–21	La Liga	36	2	1	0	—		—		37	2
Osasuna	2021–22	La Liga	36	2	2	0	—		—		38	2
Osasuna	2022–23	La Liga	37	1	7	0	—		—		44	1
Osasuna	2023–24	La Liga	33	1	2	0	2 (Note: Appearance(s) in UEFA Conference League)	0	1 (Note: Appearance(s) in Supercopa de España)	0	38	1
Osasuna	2024–25	La Liga	32	0	3	0	—		—		35	0
Osasuna	2025–26	La Liga	36	0	2	1	—		—		38	1
Osasuna	Total		237	7	21	1	2	0	1	0	261	8
Career total			290	12	21	1	2	0	1	0	314	13

== Honours ==
Osasuna

- Copa del Rey: runner-up 2022–23

Spain U23

- Summer Olympic silver medal: 2020
