= Jaume Grau =

Spanish footballer

Personal information
- Full name: Jaume Grau Ciscar
- Date of birth: 5 May 1997 (age 29)
- Place of birth: Tavernes de la Valldigna, Spain
- Height: 1.84 m (6 ft 0 in)
- Position: Midfielder

Team information
- Current team: Shanghai Port (on loan from Tianjin Jinmen Tiger)
- Number: 16

Youth career
- 2005–2007: Tavernes
- 2007–2013: Valencia
- 2013–2016: Real Madrid

Senior career*
Years	Team	Apps	(Gls)
2016–2019	Real Madrid B	66	(1)
2016–2017	→ Navalcarnero (loan)	25	(0)
2019–2022	Osasuna	1	(0)
2019–2020	→ Lugo (loan)	27	(0)
2020–2021	→ Tondela (loan)	30	(0)
2022–2024	Zaragoza	83	(5)
2024–2026	AVS	49	(2)
2026–	Tianjin Jinmen Tiger	15	(0)
2026–	→ Shanghai Port (loan)	0	(0)
- * Club domestic league appearances and goals as of 31 May 2026

Jaume Grau Ciscar (born 5 May 1997) is a Spanish professional footballer who plays as a midfielder for Chinese Super League club Shanghai Port, on loan from Tianjin Jinmen Tiger.

== Club career ==
Born in Tavernes de la Valldigna, Valencian Community, Grau joined Real Madrid's youth setup in 2013, from Valencia CF. On 22 July 2016, after finishing his formation, he was loaned to Segunda División B side CDA Navalcarnero, for one year.

Grau made his senior debut on 21 August 2016, playing the last 14 minutes in a 2–0 home win against SD Amorebieta. The following July, after contributing with 25 appearances during the campaign, he returned to Los Blancos and was assigned to the reserves also in the third division; on 20 October 2017, he extended his contract until 2019.

On 9 July 2019, Grau signed a three-year contract with La Liga side CA Osasuna, and was immediately loaned to CD Lugo in Segunda División for the season. He made his professional debut on 17 August, starting in a 0–0 home draw against Extremadura UD.

On 24 August 2020, Grau moved abroad with Primeira Liga side C.D. Tondela, after agreeing to a one-year loan deal. Upon returning, he made his debut in the Spanish top tier on 18 September 2021, replacing Darko Brašanac in a 2–0 away win over Deportivo Alavés.

On 19 January 2022, Grau signed a three-and-a-half-year contract with Real Zaragoza in the second division. On 22 August, he terminated his link with the club.

On 22 August 2024, Grau joined Liga Portugal 2 club AVS. On 14 February 2026, the club announced Gray's departure and he is joining Chinese Super League club Tianjin Jinmen Tiger.

On 23 July 2026, Grau was loaned out to Chinese Super League club Shanghai Port as AFC Champions League foreign player.

== Career statistics ==
=== Club ===
As of match played 15 September 2026

Appearances and goals by club, season and competition
Club	Season	League			National Cup		Continental		Other		Total	
Club	Season	Division	Apps	Goals	Apps	Goals	Apps	Goals	Apps	Goals	Apps	Goals
Real Madrid B	2015–16	Segunda División B	0	0	—		—		—		0	0
Real Madrid B	2017–18	Segunda División B	35	1	—		—		—		35	1
Real Madrid B	2018–19	Segunda División B	31	0	—		—		2 (Note: Appearance(s) in Promotion Playoffs)	0	33	0
Real Madrid B	Total		66	1	0	0	—		2	0	68	1
Navalcarnero (loan)	2016–17	Segunda División B	25	0	0	0	—		—		25	0
Osasuna	2021–22	La Liga	1	0	2	0	—		—		3	0
Lugo (loan)	2019–20	Segunda División	27	0	1	0	—		—		28	0
Tondela (loan)	2020–21	Primeira Liga	30	0	2	0	—		—		32	0
Zaragoza	2021–22	Segunda División	12	2	—		—		—		12	2
Zaragoza	2022–23	Segunda División	35	1	1	0	—		—		36	1
Zaragoza	2023–24	Segunda División	36	2	1	0	—		—		37	2
Zaragoza	2024–25	Segunda División	0	0	—		—		—		0	0
Zaragoza	Total		83	5	2	0	—		—		85	5
AVS	2024–25	Primeira Liga	29	2	1	0	—		2	0	32	2
AVS	2025–26	Primeira Liga	18	0	4	0	—		—		22	0
AVS	Total		47	2	5	0	—		2	0	54	2
Tianjin Jinmen Tiger	2026	Chinese Super League	15	0	0	0	—		—		15	0
Shanghai Port (loan)	2026	Chinese Super League	—		—		1 (Note: Appearance(s) in AFC Champions League Elite)	1	—		1	1
Career total			294	8	12	0	1	1	4	0	311	9
