= Ante Budimir =

Croatian footballer (born 1991)

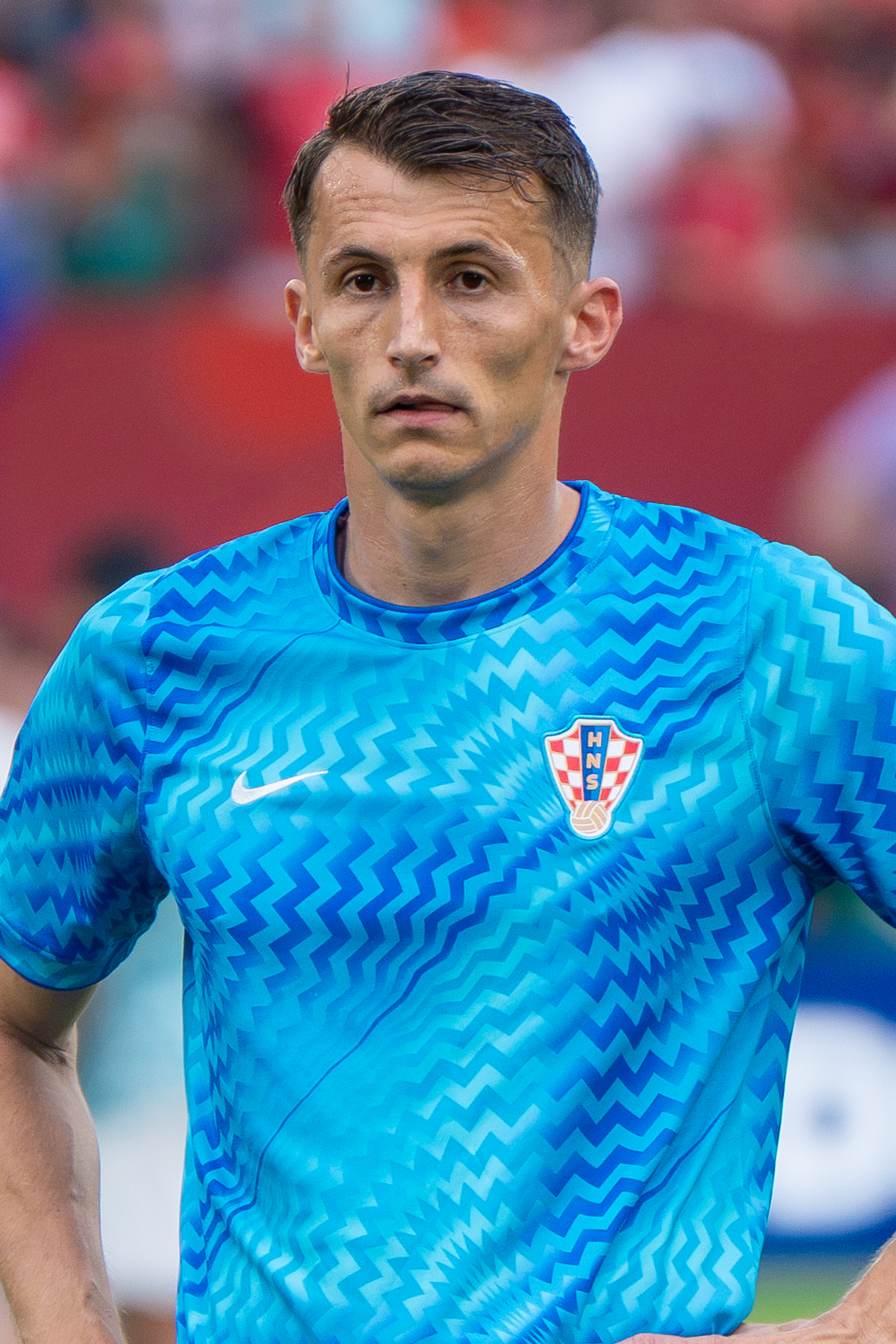
- Budimir with Croatia in 2026

Personal information
- Full name: Ante Budimir
- Date of birth: 22 July 1991 (age 35)
- Place of birth: Zenica, SR Bosnia and Herzegovina, Yugoslavia
- Height: 1.90 m (6 ft 3 in)
- Position: Striker

Team information
- Current team: Osasuna
- Number: 17

Youth career
- 1998–2008: Radnik Velika Gorica
- 2008: LASK
- 2008–2009: Radnik Velika Gorica

Senior career*
Years	Team	Apps	(Gls)
2009–2010	HNK Gorica	22	(6)
2011–2013	Inter Zaprešić	66	(18)
2013–2014	Lokomotiva Zagreb	30	(17)
2014–2016	FC St. Pauli	19	(0)
2015–2016	→ Crotone (loan)	40	(16)
2016–2018	Sampdoria	11	(0)
2017–2018	→ Crotone (loan)	22	(6)
2018–2019	Crotone	17	(3)
2019	→ Mallorca (loan)	18	(5)
2019–2021	Mallorca	36	(13)
2020–2021	→ Osasuna (loan)	30	(11)
2021–	Osasuna	179	(79)

International career^{‡}
2005	Croatia U15	1	(0)
2012	Croatia U21	2	(0)
2020–	Croatia	44	(7)
Medal record
Men's football
Representing Croatia
FIFA World Cup
Third place	2022 Qatar
- * Club domestic league appearances and goals as of 7 November 2026 ‡ National team caps and goals as of 12 November 2026

Ante Budimir (Croatian pronunciation: [ǎːnte bûdimiːr]; born 22 July 1991) is a professional footballer who plays as a striker for La Liga club Osasuna. Born in Bosnia and Herzegovina, he plays for the Croatia national team.

== Club career ==
=== FC St. Pauli ===
Budimir with St. Pauli in 2015

In August 2014, Budimir joined German club FC St. Pauli of the 2. Bundesliga on a four-year deal until 2018. St. Pauli had to pay a transfer fee believed to be around €900,000. In an interview on Budimir's signing, former Croatian international Jurica Vranješ described him as "tall, strong in the air, and reliable in combinations" and compared his style to Dimitar Berbatov. Budimir had a tough time at St. Pauli, scoring only one goal in 20 appearances for the club.

=== Crotone and Sampdoria ===
On 1 September 2015, Budimir was loaned out to Italian club Crotone for the remainder of the season. He made his Crotone debut on 7 September 2015, in a 4–0 loss to Cagliari Calcio, coming on as a 71st-minute substitute for Pietro De Giorgio. In March 2016, Crotone exercised their €1 million buyout option on the player. Budimir ended the season as Crotone's top goalscorer with 16 goals in 40 Serie B appearances, as they were promoted as runners-up to Cagliari; this tally was fourth for goalscorers in the whole league season.

In June 2016, ahead of Crotone's debut Serie A season, Sampdoria of the same league activated Budimir's release clause believed to be in the region of €1.8 million, and the player signed a deal ending in mid-2020. A year later, he was sent back to Crotone on a one-year loan with obligation to buy. The obligation was fulfilled by now relegated Crotone at the end of the season, and he remained in the club on a permanent contract.

=== Mallorca ===
On 15 January 2019, Budimir moved on loan to Spanish club Mallorca. He scored his first goal for the Balearic club on 3 February as a Panenka penalty kick in a 2–0 home win over AD Alcorcón, later being sent off. On 27 June, after achieving promotion to La Liga – he scored the opening goal as they overturned a 2–0 first-leg deficit to defeat Deportivo de La Coruña 3–2 on aggregate in the play-off final – he signed a permanent deal for a €2.2 million fee.

During the 2019–20 season Budimir scored 13 goals, which also placed him as the 8th best 2019–20 La Liga top scorer.

=== Osasuna ===
On 5 October 2020, following Mallorca's relegation from La Liga, Budimir was loaned to top-tier side CA Osasuna for the 2020–21 season. On 7 June 2021, Osasuna announced the signing of Budimir on a permanent deal until June 2025. In the 2023–24 season, he became the top scorer for his club, as he also set a new personal best in La Liga by scoring 17 goals.

On 16 January 2025, Budimir scored a brace in a 3–2 away win over Athletic Bilbao in the Copa del Rey, becoming the club's all-time leading foreign goalscorer with 60 goals, surpassing previous record of Jan Urban. On 2 March, he scored a penalty in a 3–3 draw against Valencia, surpassing Sabino Andonegui's long-standing record of 57 La Liga goals for Osasuna. He finished the 2024–25 season with 21 goals, setting a new personal best and eclipsing his previous season's tally. He concluded the 2025–26 season with 17 league goals, finishing third in the La Liga scoring charts behind only Kylian Mbappé and Vedat Muriqi.

== International career ==
On 27 August 2020, during pre-season training, Budimir was called up by the Croatia national team coach Zlatko Dalić for September Nations League clashes against Portugal and France. He made his national team debut on 7 October in a friendly 2–1 victory over Switzerland, providing Mario Pašalić with an assist for the winning goal. He scored his debut goal on 11 November in a friendly 3–3 draw with Turkey.

Budimir was a member of Croatia's squad that finished third at the 2022 FIFA World Cup. He appeared twice as a substitute – in the round of 16 against Japan and the quarter-final against Brazil.

On 21 November 2023, Budimir scored the only goal of Croatia's 1–0 win over Armenia to qualify the nation for the UEFA Euro 2024.

On 18 May 2026, Budimir was selected in the 26-man squad for the 2026 FIFA World Cup. He scored the only goal in a 1–0 victory against Panama in the second group-stage match, becoming the oldest Croatian player to score at a World Cup at 34 years and 336 days old.

== Personal life ==
Budimir's family comes from the village of Ozimica in Bosnia and Herzegovina, and he was born in Zenica as it was the nearest town with an adequate hospital. Fleeing the war, the family moved to Croatia when Budimir was 6 months old. He was raised in Velika Gorica in Turopolje, where he eventually met his wife Monika.

== Career statistics ==
=== Club ===
As of match played 7 November 2026

Appearances and goals by club, season and competition
Club	Season	League			National cup (Note: Includes Croatian Cup, DFB-Pokal, Coppa Italia, Copa del Rey)		Europe		Other		Total	
Club	Season	Division	Apps	Goals	Apps	Goals	Apps	Goals	Apps	Goals	Apps	Goals
Inter Zaprešić	2010–11	Prva HNL	11	3	0	0	—		—		11	3
Inter Zaprešić	2011–12	Prva HNL	24	6	1	0	—		—		25	6
Inter Zaprešić	2012–13	Prva HNL	31	9	1	0	—		—		32	9
Inter Zaprešić	Total		66	18	2	0	0	0	0	0	68	18
Lokomotiva Zagreb	2013–14	Prva HNL	27	12	0	0	—		—		27	12
Lokomotiva Zagreb	2014–15	Prva HNL	3	5	0	0	—		—		3	5
Lokomotiva Zagreb	Total		30	17	0	0	0	0	0	0	30	17
FC St. Pauli	2014–15	2. Bundesliga	19	0	1	1	—		—		20	1
FC St. Pauli II	2014–15	Regionalliga Nord	2	1	—		—		—		2	1
Crotone (loan)	2015–16	Serie B	40	16	1	1	—		—		41	17
Sampdoria	2016–17	Serie A	11	0	3	1	—		—		14	1
Crotone (loan)	2017–18	Serie A	22	6	2	1	—		—		24	7
Crotone	2018–19	Serie B	17	3	1	0	—		—		18	3
Mallorca (loan)	2018–19	Segunda División	18	5	0	0	—		2 (Note: Appearances in La Liga play-offs)	1	20	6
Mallorca	2019–20	La Liga	35	13	1	0	—		—		36	13
Mallorca	2020–21	Segunda División	1	0	—		—		—		1	0
Mallorca	Total		36	13	1	0	0	0	0	0	37	13
Osasuna (loan)	2020–21	La Liga	30	11	2	1	—		—		32	12
Osasuna	2021–22	La Liga	28	8	2	1	—		—		30	9
Osasuna	2022–23	La Liga	31	8	6	0	—		—		37	8
Osasuna	2023–24	La Liga	33	17	2	0	2 (Note: Appearances in UEFA Europa Conference League)	1	1 (Note: Appearance in Supercopa de España)	0	38	18
Osasuna	2024–25	La Liga	38	21	4	3	—		—		42	24
Osasuna	2025–26	La Liga	37	17	3	2	—		—		40	19
Osasuna	2026–27	La Liga	12	8	0	0	—		—		12	8
Osasuna	Total		179	79	17	6	2	1	1	0	199	86
Career total			470	169	30	11	2	1	3	1	505	182

=== International ===
As of match played 12 November 2026

Appearances and goals by national team and year
National team	Year	Apps	Goals
Croatia	2020	4	1
Croatia	2021	4	0
Croatia	2022	9	0
Croatia	2023	2	1
Croatia	2024	9	1
Croatia	2025	7	3
Croatia	2026	9	1
Total		44	7

Scores and results list Croatia's goal tally first, score column indicates score after each Budimir goal.

List of international goals scored by Ante Budimir
No.	Date	Venue	Cap	Opponent	Score	Result	Competition
1	11 November 2020	Vodafone Park, Istanbul, Turkey	3	Turkey	1–1	3–3	Friendly
2	21 November 2023	Stadion Maksimir, Zagreb, Croatia	19	Armenia	1–0	1–0	UEFA Euro 2024 qualifying
3	8 June 2024	Estádio Nacional, Oeiras, Portugal	21	Portugal	2–1	2–1	Friendly
4	20 March 2025	Stadion Poljud, Split, Croatia	29	France	1–0	2–0	2024–25 UEFA Nations League A
5	6 June 2025	Estádio Algarve, Faro/Loulé, Portugal	31	Gibraltar	2–0	7–0	2026 FIFA World Cup qualification
6	9 June 2025	Opus Arena, Osijek, Croatia	32	Czech Republic	4–1	5–1	2026 FIFA World Cup qualification
7	23 June 2026	BMO Field, Toronto, Canada	39	Panama	1–0	1–0	2026 FIFA World Cup

== Honours ==
Osasuna

- Copa del Rey runner-up: 2022–23

Croatia

- FIFA World Cup third place: 2022
