= Aridane Hernández =

Spanish footballer (born 1989)

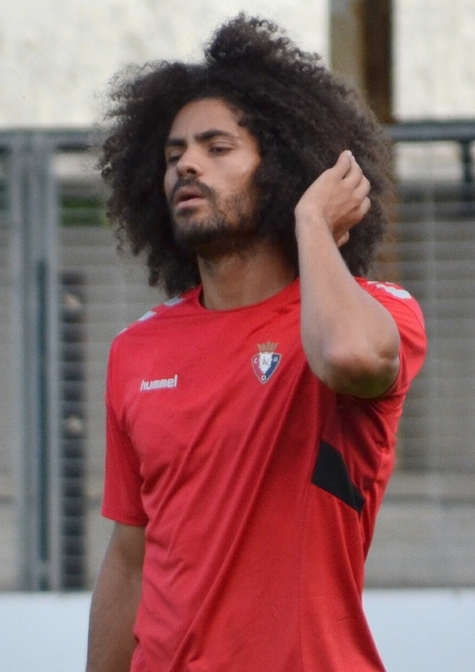
- Aridane with Osasuna in 2018

Personal information
- Full name: Aridane Hernández Umpiérrez
- Date of birth: 23 March 1989 (age 37)
- Place of birth: Tuineje, Spain
- Height: 1.86 m (6 ft 1 in)
- Position: Centre-back

Team information
- Current team: Cartagena
- Number: 23

Youth career
- Gran Tarajal
- 2003–2006: Valladolid
- 2006–2007: Real Madrid
- 2007–2008: Fuerteventura

Senior career*
Years	Team	Apps	(Gls)
2008–2010	Valladolid B	48	(1)
2010–2011	Ceuta	16	(0)
2011–2012	Alavés	14	(2)
2012	Corralejo	9	(0)
2013–2015	Eldense	84	(5)
2015–2016	Granada	0	(0)
2015–2016	→ Cádiz (loan)	27	(0)
2016–2017	Cádiz	37	(2)
2017–2023	Osasuna	141	(4)
2023–2025	Rayo Vallecano	33	(0)
2025–2026	Almería	5	(0)
2026–	Cartagena	8	(1)
- * Club domestic league appearances and goals as of 10 June 2026

Aridane Hernández Umpiérrez (born 23 March 1989), commonly known as just Aridane, is a Spanish professional footballer who plays as a centre-back for Primera Federación club Cartagena.

== Career ==
Born in Tuineje, Las Palmas, Canary Islands, Aridane joined Real Madrid's youth setup in 2006, aged 17, after stints at UD Gran Tarajal and Real Valladolid. On 31 August 2007, he joined Liverpool, but appearing with UD Fuerteventura.

In July 2008 Aridane returned to Valladolid, being assigned to the reserves in Tercera División. He was first summoned to a La Liga match on 23 May 2009, but remained on the bench in a 2–1 home loss against Sporting de Gijón.

On 5 August 2010, Aridane moved to AD Ceuta in Segunda División B; after appearing sparingly he moved to fellow league team Deportivo Alavés roughly a year later. In the 2012 summer he signed for CD Corralejo in the fourth tier, but moved to CD Eldense in the same division on 27 December.

On 9 July 2015, after nearly signing for UE Olot, Aridane signed a two-year deal with La Liga side Granada CF, and was loaned to Cádiz CF also in the third tier on 19 July. After contributing with 33 appearances in the latter's promotion campaign, he signed a permanent three-year deal with the club on 18 July 2016.

Aridane made his professional debut on 19 August 2016, starting in a 1–1 away draw against UD Almería. He scored his first professional goal on 23 October, netting the first in a 2–2 home draw against UCAM Murcia CF.

On 17 July 2017, Aridane signed a four-year contract with fellow second tier club CA Osasuna, for a transfer fee of €1.5 million. In his first season with the new club he played 29 matches in Segunda División, among them 26 as a starter. He also scored one goal in the match against Rayo Vallecano in the Campo de Fútbol de Vallecas when Osasuna won 3–0. It took place on 10 September 2017.

On 5 July 2023, Aridane signed a two-year contract with Rayo also in the top tier. On 10 September 2025, he moved to second division side UD Almería.

In December 2025, Aridane was sanctioned by the Rojiblancos after being caught drunk driving in a car accident. He still managed to feature in two matches after the incident, but terminated his link on 2 February of the following year.

== Career statistics ==
As of match played 27 January 2024

Appearances and goals by club, season and competition
Club	Season	League			National cup		Other		Total	
Club	Season	Division	Apps	Goals	Apps	Goals	Apps	Goals	Apps	Goals
Ceuta	2010–11	Segunda División B	16	0	2	0	—		18	0
Alavés	2011–12	Segunda División B	14	2	1	0	—		15	2
Eldense	2012–13	Tercera División	19	2		0	—		19	2
Eldense	2013–14	Tercera División	29	2	0	0	2 (Note: Appearance(s) in Promotion Playoffs)	0	31	2
Eldense	2014–15	Segunda División B	36	1	2	0	2 (Note: Appearance(s) in Relegation Playoffs)	0	40	1
Eldense	Total		84	5	2	0	4	0	90	5
Cádiz (loan)	2015–16	Segunda División B	27	0	5	0	6	0	38	0
Cádiz	2016–17	Segunda División	37	2	0	0	2	0	39	2
Cádiz	Total		64	2	5	0	8	0	77	2
Osasuna	2017–18	Segunda División	29	1	0	0	—		29	1
Osasuna	2018–19	Segunda División	21	0	0	0	—		21	0
Osasuna	2019–20	La Liga	29	3	2	0	—		31	3
Osasuna	2020–21	La Liga	24	0	0	0	—		24	0
Osasuna	2021–22	La Liga	15	0	1	0	—		16	0
Osasuna	2022–23	La Liga	23	0	8	0	—		31	0
Osasuna	Total		141	4	11	0	0	0	152	4
Rayo Vallecano	2023–24	La Liga	12	0	2	0	—		14	0
Career total			331	11	23	0	12	0	366	11

== Honours ==
Osasuna

- Segunda División: 2018–19
- Copa del Rey: runner-up 2022–23
