= Cote (footballer) =

Spanish footballer

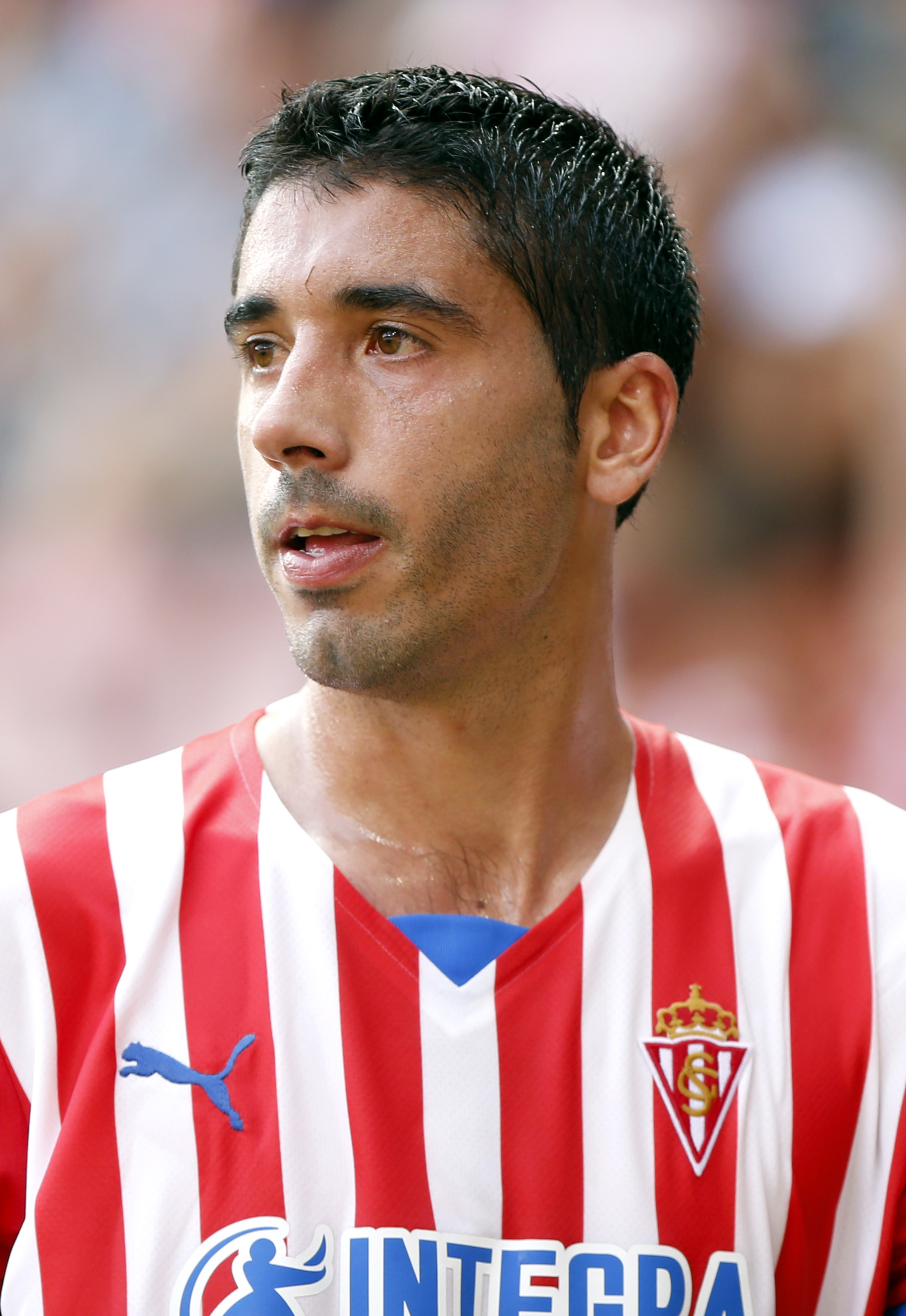
- Cote with Sporting Gijón in 2022

Personal information
- Full name: José Ángel Valdés Díaz
- Date of birth: 5 September 1989 (age 37)
- Place of birth: Gijón, Spain
- Height: 1.82 m (5 ft 11 1/2 in)
- Position: Left-back

Youth career
- 1994–1996: Roces
- 1996–1997: La Braña
- 1997–2008: Sporting Gijón

Senior career*
Years	Team	Apps	(Gls)
2008–2009	Sporting Gijón B	22	(0)
2009–2011	Sporting Gijón	52	(1)
2011–2014	Roma	27	(0)
2012–2014	→ Real Sociedad (loan)	33	(1)
2014–2017	Porto	14	(0)
2016–2017	→ Villarreal (loan)	7	(0)
2017–2021	Eibar	107	(2)
2021–2022	Osasuna	23	(1)
2022–2025	Sporting Gijón	97	(5)
Total		382	(10)

International career
2009	Spain U20	10	(0)
2009–2011	Spain U21	4	(0)
- * Club domestic league appearances and goals

José Ángel Valdés Díaz (born 5 September 1989), known as José Ángel or Cote, is a Spanish former professional footballer who played as a left-back.

He started and finished his 17-year career with Sporting de Gijón. He achieved La Liga totals of 222 games and five goals over 11 seasons with that club, Real Sociedad, Villarreal, Eibar and Osasuna, and also spent two years in the Portuguese Primeira Liga with Porto and one in the Italian Serie A with Roma.

Cote won the 2011 European Under-21 Championship with Spain.

== Club career ==
=== Sporting Gijón ===
Born in Gijón, Asturias, Cote was a product of hometown Sporting de Gijón's prolific youth system, Mareo. He made his first-team and La Liga debut on 8 February 2009, in a 3–1 away loss against FC Barcelona. He went on to feature regularly for the duration of the season as the side narrowly avoided a drop, adding a goal in a 3–2 home win over Deportivo de La Coruña.

In 2009–10, Cote again played 13 games for the first team as they retained once again their top-division status (15th position). In the following campaigns, he continued battling for position with another club youth graduate, Roberto Canella, with both players appearing in roughly the same number of matches.

=== Roma ===
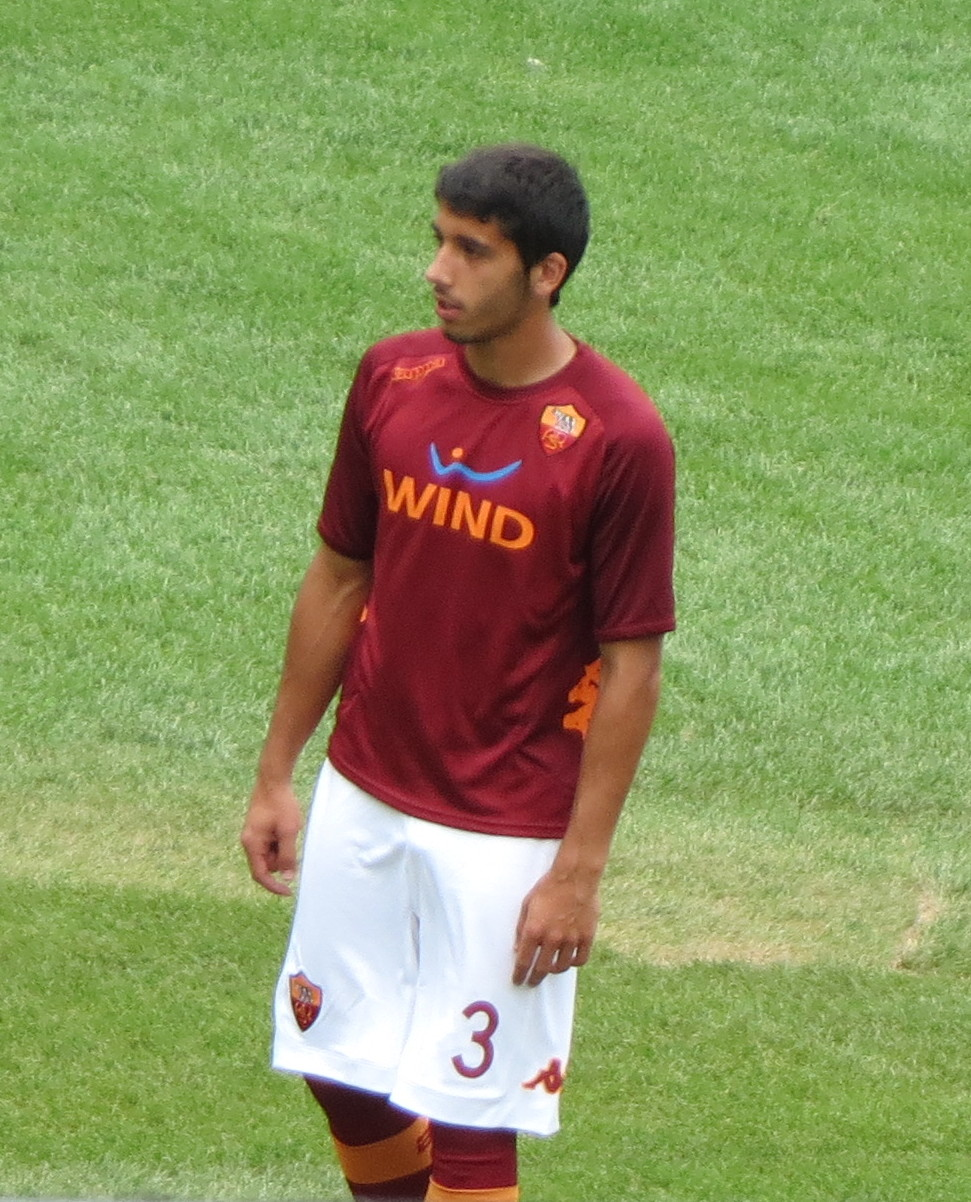
José Ángel training with Roma in 2012

On 19 July 2011, Serie A club AS Roma reached an agreement with Sporting Gijón for the transfer of Cote, joining compatriot Luis Enrique who had just been appointed team coach; the former paid €4.5 million for his services, plus bonuses. He made his competitive debut on 11 September, being sent off in a 1–2 home loss against Cagliari.

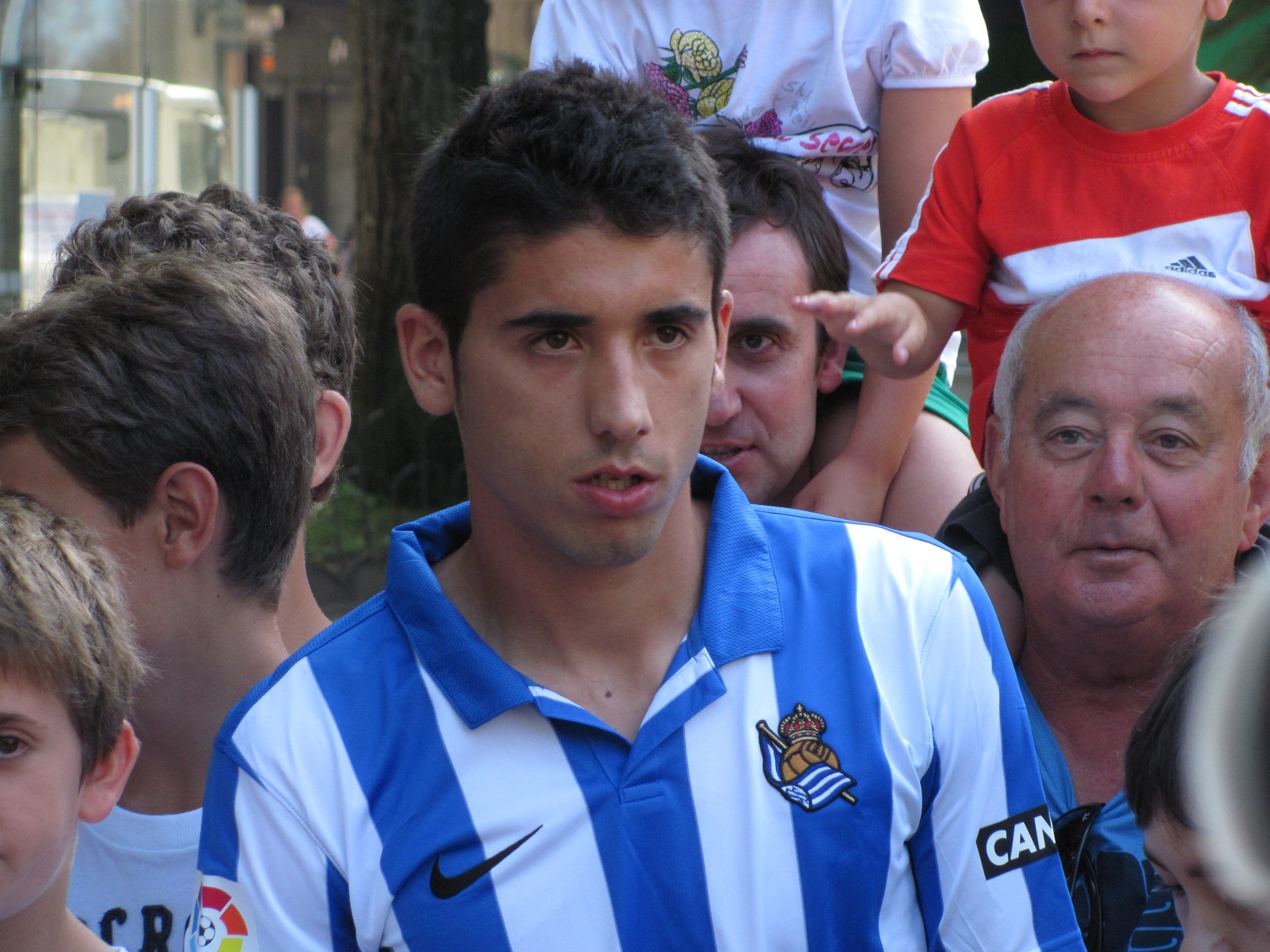
Cote with Real Sociedad in 2012

José Ángel spent the 2012–13 and 2013–14 seasons on loan to Real Sociedad, mainly acting as backup to Alberto de la Bella during his spell.

=== Porto ===
In July 2014, Cote joined FC Porto for free, with Roma being eligible to receive 50% of any future transfer fee. He appeared in 29 competitive games during his two-year spell in Portugal, his Primeira Liga debut arriving on 31 August 2014 in a 3–0 home defeat of Moreirense FC (90 minutes played).

Cote was loaned to Villarreal on 25 July 2016 until end of the season.

=== Later career ===
On 14 July 2017, Cote signed a three-year contract with SD Eibar as a free agent. On 5 July 2021, after suffering relegation, he joined Osasuna on a two-year deal.

Cote returned to his first club Sporting in July 2022, on a two-year contract. On 5 March 2025, the 35-year-old announced his retirement at the end of the season.

== International career ==
Cote earned four caps for the Spain under-21 team, his debut coming on 27 March 2009. He was selected by coach Luis Milla to the squad that appeared – and won – the 2011 UEFA European Championship in Denmark, being an unused member as Espanyol's Dídac Vilà played all the matches and minutes.

== Career statistics ==
As of match played 22 May 2022

Appearances and goals by club, season and competition
Club	Season	League			National Cup		League Cup		Continental		Other		Total	
Club	Season	Division	Apps	Goals	Apps	Goals	Apps	Goals	Apps	Goals	Apps	Goals	Apps	Goals
Sporting Gijón B	2008–09	Segunda División B	22	0	—		—		—		1 (Note: Appearance in Segunda División B relegation playoffs)	0	23	0
Sporting Gijón	2008–09	La Liga	13	1	4	0	—		—		—		17	1
Sporting Gijón	2009–10	La Liga	13	0	2	0	—		—		—		15	0
Sporting Gijón	2010–11	La Liga	26	0	1	0	—		—		—		27	0
Sporting Gijón	Total		52	1	7	0	0	0	0	0	0	0	59	1
Roma	2011–12	Serie A	27	0	2	0	—		2 (Note: Appearances in UEFA Europa League)	0	—		31	0
Real Sociedad (loan)	2012–13	La Liga	11	0	2	0	—		—		—		13	0
Real Sociedad (loan)	2013–14	La Liga	22	1	7	0	—		1 (Note: Appearance in UEFA Champions League)	0	—		30	1
Real Sociedad (loan)	Total		33	1	9	0	0	0	1	0	0	0	43	1
Porto	2014–15	Primeira Liga	7	0	1	0	5	0	0	0	—		13	0
Porto	2015–16	Primeira Liga	7	0	4	0	3	0	2	0	—		16	0
Porto	Total		14	0	5	0	8	0	2	0	0	0	29	0
Villarreal (loan)	2016–17	La Liga	7	0	3	0	—		8 (Note: Two appearances in UEFA Champions League, six appearances in UEFA Europa League)	0	—		18	0
Eibar	2017–18	La Liga	30	0	1	0	—		—		—		31	0
Eibar	2018–19	La Liga	35	1	1	0	—		—		—		36	1
Eibar	2019–20	La Liga	28	1	0	0	—		—		—		28	1
Eibar	2020–21	La Liga	14	0	0	0	—		—		—		14	0
Eibar	Total		107	2	2	0	0	0	0	0	0	0	109	2
Osasuna	2021–22	La Liga	23	1	2	0	—		—		—		25	1
Career total			285	5	30	0	8	0	13	0	1	0	337	5

== Honours ==
Spain U20

- Mediterranean Games: 2009

Spain U21

- UEFA European Under-21 Championship: 2011
