= Tajonar Facilities =

Football training ground in Spain

Coordinates: 42°46′28″N 01°37′32″W

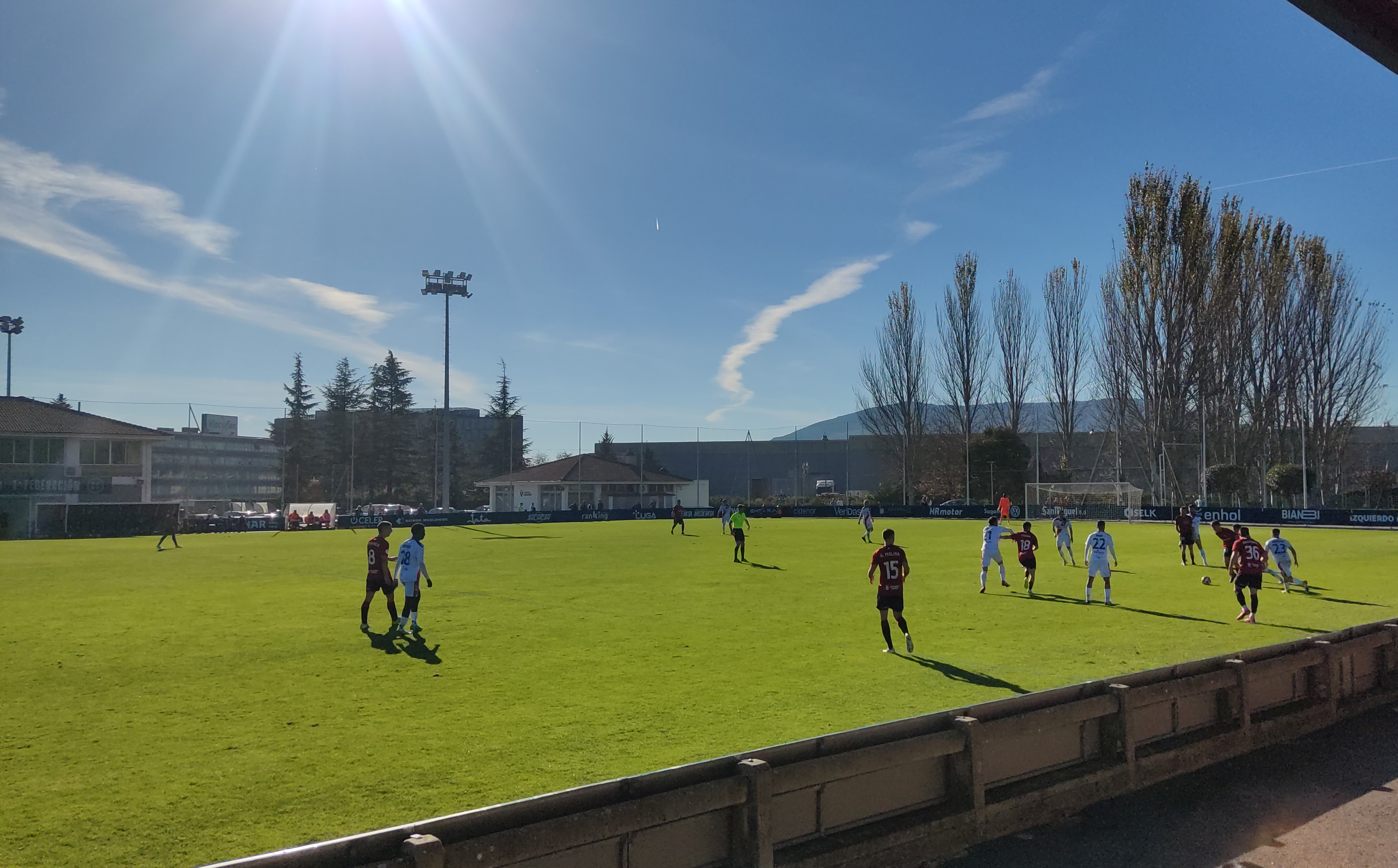
- Interactive map of Tajonar Facilities
- Location: Aranguren; Navarre, Spain
- Owner: CA Osasuna
- Type: Football training ground

Construction
- Built: 1982

Tenants
- CA Osasuna (training) (1982-); CA Osasuna B CA Osasuna Femenino

The Tajonar Facilities (Spanish: Instalaciones de Tajonar), is the training ground of the Spanish football club CA Osasuna. Located at the southern outskirts of Pamplona, the centre was opened in July 1982 by then-club president Fermín Ezcurra. The club's women's teams and youth sides also play at the facility, with the Tajonar name used as a metonym to refer to the academy system. Since its opening in 1982, the Tajonar Soccer School has been preparing young football players here.

In 1987–88, the centre was enlarged to cover an area of 80,000 m^{2} (860,000 sq ft).

In 2001, the centre was renovated and further expanded with the construction of three additional training pitches. In the following years, another 160,000 m^{2} (1,700,000 sq ft) of land were acquired and, after several sales operations, the club kept the current 239,092 m^{2} (2,573,560 sq ft) of the Tajonar Facilities.

== Facilities ==
- Tajonar Facilities Stadium with a capacity of 4,500 seats, is the home stadium of CA Osasuna B, the reserve team of CA Osasuna.
- 1 grass pitch.
- 5 artificial pitches.
- Swimming pool and a water park.
- Service centre with gymnasium.
