= Kike Barja =

Spanish footballer

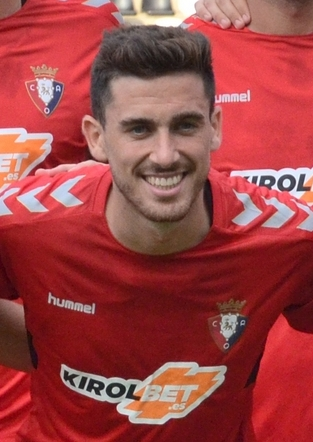
- Barja with Osasuna in 2018

Personal information
- Full name: Enrique Barja Afonso
- Date of birth: April 1, 1997 (age 29)
- Place of birth: Noáin, Spain
- Height: 1.78 m (5 ft 10 in)
- Positions: Wide midfielder; winger

Team information
- Current team: Osasuna
- Number: 11

Youth career
- 2005–2014: Osasuna

Senior career*
Years	Team	Apps	(Gls)
2013–2018	Osasuna B	144	(37)
2014–	Osasuna	210	(12)

International career^{‡}
2014	Spain U17	1	(1)
2015	Spain U18	2	(0)
2015	Spain U19	1	(0)
2025–	Basque Country	1	(0)
- * Club domestic league appearances and goals as of 7 November 2026 ‡ National team caps and goals as of 15 November 2025

Enrique "Kike" Barja Afonso (born 1 April 1997) is a Spanish professional footballer who plays as a wide midfielder or winger for and captains La Liga club Osasuna.

== Club career ==
Born in Noáin, Navarre, Barja joined CA Osasuna's youth setup in 2005 at the age of eight. He made his senior debut for the reserves on 25 August 2013 at the age of 16, coming on as a second-half substitute for Miguel Olavide and scoring the last in a 2–0 Tercera División home win against CD Huarte.

On 28 November 2015, Barja scored a brace in a 4–0 away routing over UD Mutilvera; he added another double seven days later, in a 5–0 thrashing of CD Erriberri. The following 25 September, he again scored two goals in a 3–1 home win against CD Guijuelo in the Segunda División B.

On 15 May 2017, Barja was definitely promoted to the main squad ahead of the 2017–18 season. He made his first team – and La Liga – debut five days later, replacing Carlos Clerc in a 0–5 away loss to Sevilla FC, as his side was already relegated.

== International career ==
Barja was called up to the Basque Country national team for a friendly match against Palestine on 15 November 2025.

== Career statistics ==
=== Club ===
As of match played 7 November 2026

Appearances and goals by club, season and competition
Club	Season	League			Copa del Rey		Other		Total	
Club	Season	Division	Apps	Goals	Apps	Goals	Apps	Goals	Apps	Goals
Osasuna B	2013–14	Tercera División	28	6	—		1 (Note: Appearance(s) in Promotion Playoffs)	0	29	6
Osasuna B	2014–15	Tercera División	32	4	—		2	1	34	5
Osasuna B	2015–16	Tercera División	31	12	—		4	0	35	12
Osasuna B	2016–17	Segunda División B	37	8	—		—		37	8
Osasuna B	2017–18	Segunda División B	16	7	—		—		16	7
Osasuna B	Total		144	37	—		7	1	151	38
Osasuna	2016–17	La Liga	1	0	0	0	—		1	0
Osasuna	2017–18	Segunda División	19	1	1	0	—		20	1
Osasuna	2018–19	Segunda División	34	3	1	0	—		35	3
Osasuna	2019–20	La Liga	8	0	2	0	—		10	0
Osasuna	2020–21	La Liga	33	2	4	4	—		37	6
Osasuna	2021–22	La Liga	21	2	3	0	—		24	2
Osasuna	2022–23	La Liga	27	1	8	1	—		35	2
Osasuna	2023–24	La Liga	16	0	2	0	3 (Note: Two appearances in UEFA Conference League, one appearance in Supercopa de España)	0	21	0
Osasuna	2024–25	La Liga	15	0	3	0	—		18	0
Osasuna	2025–26	La Liga	27	2	4	1	—		31	3
Osasuna	2026–27	La Liga	9	1	1	1	—		10	2
Osasuna	Total		210	12	29	7	3	0	242	19
Career total			354	49	29	7	10	1	393	57

== Honours ==
Osasuna

- Segunda División: 2018–19
- Copa del Rey: runner-up 2022–23

Osasuna B

- Tercera División: 2015–16
