= 2023 Copa del Rey final =

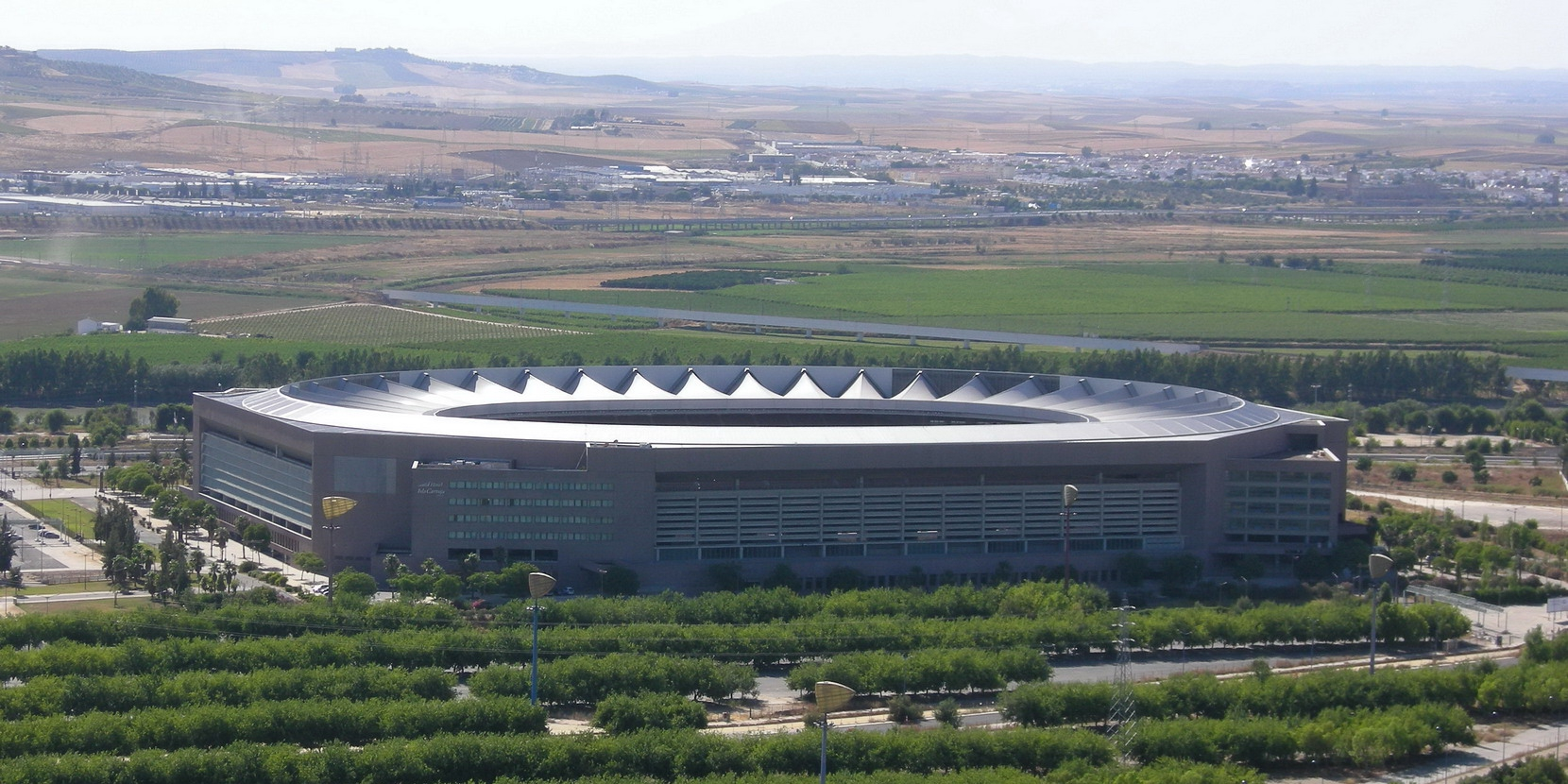
- La Cartuja in Seville hosted the final.
- Event: 2022–23 Copa del Rey
| Real Madrid | Osasuna |
| 2 | 1 |
- Date: 6 May 2023
- Venue: La Cartuja, Seville
- Man of the Match: Rodrygo (Real Madrid)
- Referee: José María Sánchez Martínez (Murcia)
- Attendance: 55,579

The 2023 Copa del Rey final was a football match that decided the winner of the 2022–23 Copa del Rey, the 121st edition of Spain's primary football cup (including two seasons where two rival editions were played). The match was played on 6 May 2023 at the Estadio de La Cartuja in Seville between Real Madrid and Osasuna.

Real Madrid was featured in their first final since 2014, having previously won the trophy on 19 occasions. Osasuna made its second Copa del Rey final appearance in history, having lost in 2005.

Real Madrid won the match 2–1 for their 20th Copa del Rey victory.

== Route to the final ==
| Real Madrid | | Round | Osasuna |
|---|---|---|---|---|
| Opponent | Result | | Opponent | Result |
| Bye | | First round | Fuentes | 4–1 (A) |
| Bye | | Second round | Arnedo | 3–1 (A) |
| Cacereño | 1–0 (A) | Round of 32 | Gimnàstic | 2–1 (a.e.t.) (A) |
| Villarreal | 3–2 (A) | Round of 16 | Real Betis | 2–2 (4–2 p) (A) |
| Atlético Madrid | 3–1 (a.e.t.) (H) | Quarter-finals | Sevilla | 2–1 (a.e.t.) (H) |
| Barcelona | 0–1 (H), 4–0 (A) | Semi-finals | Athletic Bilbao | 1–0 (H), 1–1 (a.e.t.) (A) |

Key: (H) = Home; (A) = Away

== Match ==
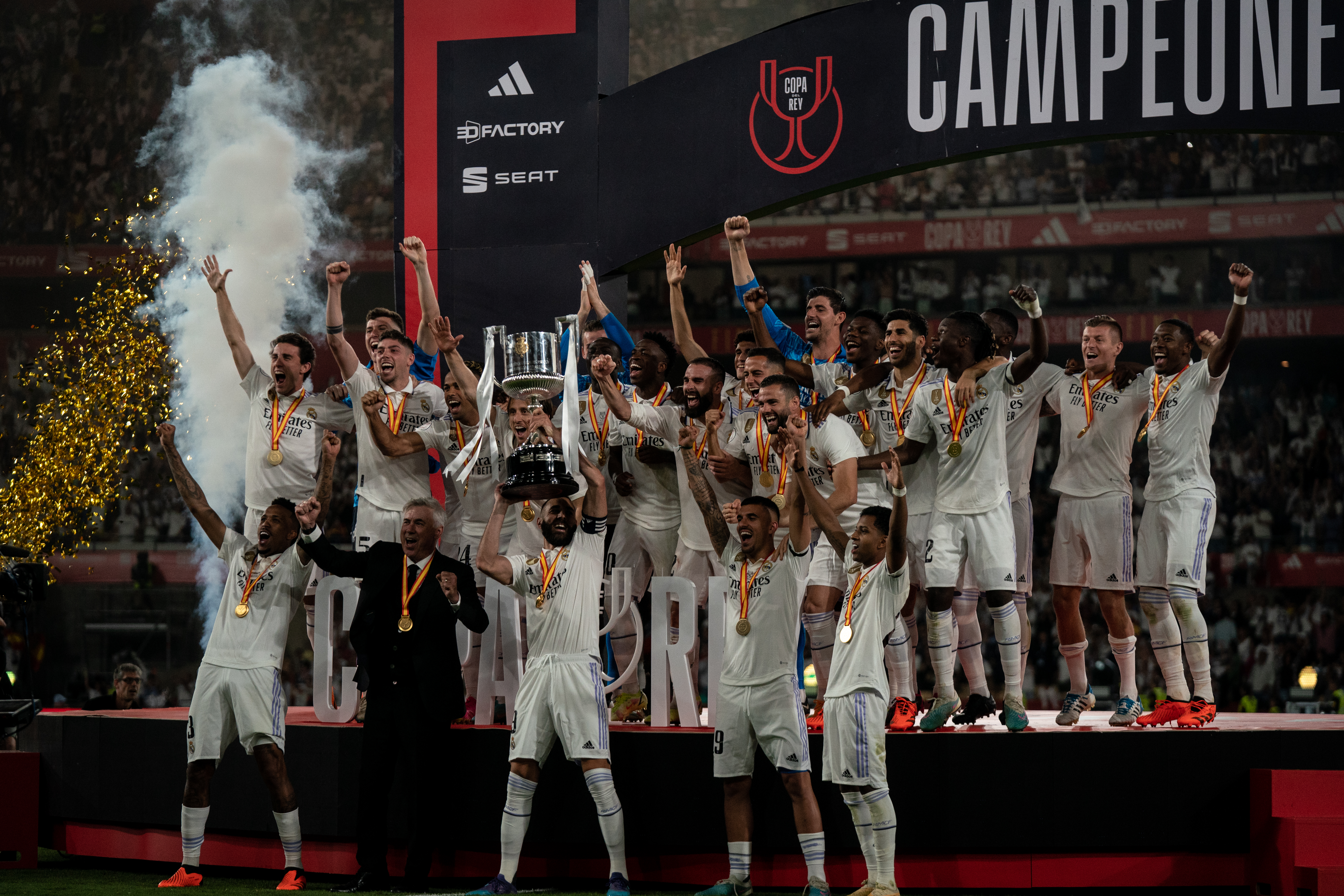
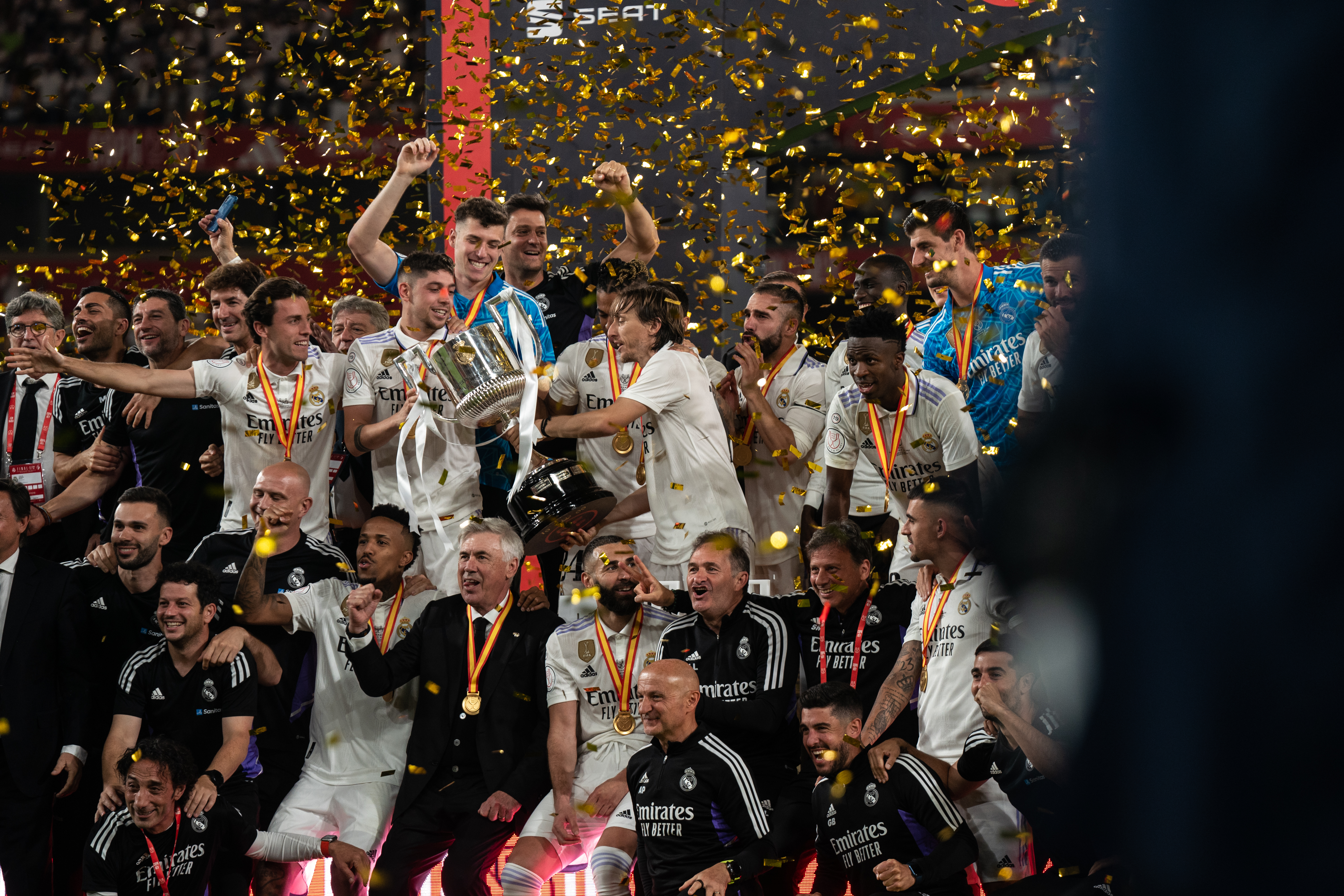
Real Madrid celebrating with the Copa del Rey trophy

=== Details ===
6 May 2023
22:00 CEST

| Real Madrid | 2–1 | Osasuna |
|---|---|---|
| Rodrygo 2', 70' | Report | Torró 58' |

La Cartuja, Seville
Attendance: 55,579
Referee: José María Sánchez Martínez (Murcia)

| Real Madrid | Osasuna |

| GK | 1 | (Belgium) Thibaut Courtois | (yellow card) 90+4' |
| RB | 2 | (Spain) Dani Carvajal |
| CB | 3 | (Brazil) Éder Militão | (yellow card) 41' |
| CB | 4 | (Austria) David Alaba |
| LB | 12 | (France) Eduardo Camavinga | (yellow card) 75' |
| DM | 18 | (France) Aurélien Tchouaméni | | (substituted off) 69' |
| CM | 15 | (Uruguay) Federico Valverde | (yellow card) 90' |
| CM | 8 | (Germany) Toni Kroos | | (substituted off) 82' |
| RW | 21 | (Brazil) Rodrygo | | (substituted off) 89' |
| CF | 9 | (France) Karim Benzema (c) |
| LW | 20 | (Brazil) Vinícius Júnior | (yellow card) 45' |
Substitutes:
| GK | 13 | (Ukraine) Andriy Lunin |
| DF | 5 | (Spain) Jesús Vallejo |
| DF | 6 | (Spain) Nacho |
| DF | 16 | (Spain) Álvaro Odriozola |
| DF | 17 | (Spain) Lucas Vázquez |
| DF | 22 | (Germany) Antonio Rüdiger | | (substituted on) 69' |
| MF | 10 | (Croatia) Luka Modrić | | (substituted on) 82' |
| MF | 19 | (Spain) Dani Ceballos |
| FW | 7 | (Belgium) Eden Hazard |
| FW | 11 | (Spain) Marco Asensio | | (substituted on) 89' |
| FW | 24 | (Dominican Republic) Mariano |
Manager:
(Italy) Carlo Ancelotti

| GK | 1 | (Spain) Sergio Herrera |
| RB | 15 | (Spain) Rubén Peña | | (substituted off) 75' |
| CB | 23 | (Spain) Aridane Hernández |
| CB | 5 | (Spain) David García (c) | (yellow card) 37' |
| LB | 3 | (Spain) Juan Cruz |
| DM | 6 | (Spain) Lucas Torró | | (substituted off) 86' |
| CM | 7 | (Spain) Jon Moncayola | (yellow card) 21' |
| CM | 22 | (Spain) Aimar Oroz |
| RW | 16 | (Spain) Moi Gómez | | (substituted off) 86' |
| CF | 17 | (Croatia) Ante Budimir | | (substituted off) 70' |
| LW | 12 | (Morocco) Abde Ezzalzouli | | (substituted off) 75' |
Substitutes:
| GK | 25 | (Spain) Aitor Fernández |
| DF | 4 | (Spain) Unai García |
| DF | 20 | (Spain) Manu Sánchez |
| DF | 31 | (Spain) Jorge Herrando |
| DF | 35 | (Spain) Diego Moreno |
| MF | 11 | (Spain) Kike Barja | (yellow card) 83' | (substituted on) 75' |
| MF | 14 | (Spain) Rubén García | | (substituted on) 75' |
| MF | 19 | (Spain) Pablo Ibáñez | (yellow card) 90+4' | (substituted on) 86' |
| MF | 34 | (Spain) Iker Muñoz |
| FW | 9 | (Argentina) Chimy Ávila | | (substituted on) 70' |
| FW | 18 | (Spain) Kike García | | (substituted on) 86' |
Manager:
(Spain) Jagoba Arrasate

Man of the Match:
Rodrygo (Real Madrid)

Assistant referees:
Raúl Cabañero Martínez (Region of Murcia)
José Enrique Pérez Naranjo (Las Palmas)
Fourth official:
Juan Martínez Munuera (Valencia)
Reserve assistant referee:
Juan José López Mir (Region of Murcia)
Video assistant referee:
Santiago Jaime Latre (Aragon)
Assistant video assistant referee:
Diego Barbero Sevilla (Andalusia)

Match rules

- 90 minutes.
- 30 minutes of extra time if necessary.
- Penalty shoot-out if scores still level.
- Eleven named substitutes.
- Maximum of five substitutions, with a sixth allowed in extra time. (Note: Each team was given only three opportunities to make substitutions, with a fourth opportunity in extra time, excluding substitutions made at half-time, before the start of extra time and at half-time in extra time.)
