= 2023–24 CA Osasuna season =

CA Osasuna
2023–24 season
- President: Luis Sabalza
- Head coach: Jagoba Arrasate
- Stadium: El Sadar
- La Liga: 11th
- Copa del Rey: Round of 16
- Supercopa de España: Semi-finals
- UEFA Europa Conference League: Play-off round
- Top goalscorer: League: Ante Budimir (17); All: Ante Budimir (18)
Home colours	Away colours	Third colours

The 2023–24 season was CA Osasuna's 104th season in existence and fifth consecutive season in La Liga. They also competed in the Copa del Rey, the Supercopa de España and the UEFA Europa Conference League.

== Players ==
=== First-team squad ===
As of 1 February 2024

Note: Flags indicate national team as defined under FIFA eligibility rules; some limited exceptions apply. Players may hold more than one non-FIFA nationality.

No.	Pos.	Nation	Player
1	GK	ESP	Sergio Herrera
3	DF	ESP	Juan Cruz
4	DF	ESP	Unai García (vice-captain)
5	DF	ESP	David García (captain)
6	MF	ESP	Lucas Torró
7	MF	ESP	Jon Moncayola
10	MF	ESP	Aimar Oroz
11	MF	ESP	Kike Barja
12	DF	ESP	Jesús Areso
13	GK	ESP	Aitor Fernández
14	MF	ESP	Rubén García

No.	Pos.	Nation	Player
15	DF	ESP	Rubén Peña
16	MF	ESP	Moi Gómez
17	FW	CRO	Ante Budimir
19	MF	ESP	Pablo Ibáñez
20	FW	ESP	José Manuel Arnáiz
22	DF	COL	Johan Mojica (on loan from Villarreal)
23	FW	ESP	Raúl García
24	DF	ESP	Alejandro Catena
28	DF	ESP	Jorge Herrando
34	MF	ESP	Iker Muñoz

=== Reserve team ===
Note: Flags indicate national team as defined under FIFA eligibility rules; some limited exceptions apply. Players may hold more than one non-FIFA nationality.

No.	Pos.	Nation	Player
31	GK	ESP	Pablo Valencia
32	GK	GRE	Dimitrios Stamatakis

=== Out on loan ===
Note: Flags indicate national team as defined under FIFA eligibility rules; some limited exceptions apply. Players may hold more than one non-FIFA nationality.

No.	Pos.	Nation	Player
—	DF	ESP	Diego Moreno (at Cartagena until 30 June 2024)
—	DF	ESP	Nacho Vidal (at Mallorca until 30 June 2024)

No.	Pos.	Nation	Player
—	MF	ESP	Javi Martínez (at Huesca until 30 June 2024)
—	FW	ESP	Iker Benito (at Andorra until 30 June 2024)

== Transfers ==
=== In ===
Pos.	Player	Transferred from	Fee	Date	Source
DF	(Spain) Alejandro Catena	(Spain) Rayo Vallecano	Free	1 July 2023	
MF	(Spain) José Arnaiz	(Spain) Leganés	Free	1 July 2023	
DF	(Colombia) Johan Mojica	(Spain) Villarreal	Loan	26 July 2023	
FW	(Spain) Raúl García	(Spain) Real Betis	€6,500,000	10 August 2023	

=== Out ===
Pos.	Player	Transferred to	Fee	Date	Source
MF	(Spain) Iker Benito	(Spain) Andorra	Loan	1 July 2023	
DF	(Spain) Diego Moreno	(Spain) Mirandés	Loan	2 July 2023	
DF	(Spain) Aridane	(Spain) Rayo Vallecano	Free	5 July 2023	
MF	(Spain) Javi Martínez	(Spain) Huesca	Loan	23 August 2023	
DF	(Spain) Nacho Vidal	(Spain) Mallorca	Loan	26 January 2024	
FW	(Argentina) Ezequiel Ávila	(Spain) Real Betis	€4,000,000	1 February 2024	

== Pre-season and friendlies ==
Win Draw Loss

15 July 2023 Friendly	Osasuna	6–0	Osasuna B	Aranguren
10:00 CEST (UTC+2)	Kike 7', 28'; Arnaiz 43'; Ru. García 63'; Areso 71'; Budimir 75'	Report		Stadium: Tajonar Facilities; Referee: Imanol Irurtzun Artola

18 July 2023 Friendly	Osasuna	1–0	Huesca	Lerín
19:30 CEST (UTC+2)	Arnaiz 64'			Stadium: Estadio La Romaleta

21 July 2023 Euskal Herriko Futbol Txapelketa	Real Sociedad	1–3	Osasuna	Irun
20:45 CEST (UTC+2)	Cho 24'; Zubeldia (yellow card) 27'	Report	Catena 9', 38', 43'	Stadium: Stadium Gal; Referee: Ricardo de Burgos Bengoetxea

28 July 2023 Friendly	Bordeaux	0–1	Osasuna	Andernos-les-Bains
16:00 CEST (UTC+2)				Stadium: Stade Jacques Rosazza

29 July 2023 Friendly	Toulouse	2–1	Osasuna	Tarbes
12:00 CEST (UTC+2)	Dallinga 34' (pen.); Chaïbi 88'		Ibáñez 3'	Stadium: Stade Maurice Trélut

4 August 2023 Friendly	Osasuna	2–3	Alavés	Aranguren
11:00 CEST (UTC+2)	Budimir 29'; Martínez 36'		Sedlar 13'; Miguel 21', 46'	Stadium: Tajonar Facilities; Attendance: 600

4 August 2023 Friendly	Burgos	1–2	Osasuna	Burgos
19:00 CEST (UTC+2)	González 86'		Oroz 17'; Torró 80'	Stadium: El Plantío; Attendance: 5,469; Referee: Ricardo de Burgos Bengoetxea

11 October 2023 Friendly	Osasuna	2–1	Osasuna B	Aranguren
10:30 CEST (UTC+2)	Ra. García 7'; Aguilar 64'	Report	Osambela 69'	Stadium: Tajonar Facilities

== Competitions ==
=== Overall record ===
Competition	First match	Last match	Starting round	Final position	Record							
Competition	First match	Last match	Starting round	Final position	Pld	W	D	L	GF	GA	GD	Win %
La Liga	13 August 2023	25 May 2024	Matchday 1	11th	38	12	9	17	45	56	−11	31.58
Copa del Rey	7 January 2024	17 January 2024	Round of 32	Round of 16	2	1	0	1	1	2	−1	50.00
Supercopa de España	11 January 2024		Semi-finals	Semi-finals	1	0	0	1	0	2	−2	0.00
UEFA Europa Conference League	24 August 2023	31 August 2023	Play-off round	Play-off round	2	0	1	1	3	4	−1	0.00
Total					43	13	10	20	49	64	−15	30.23

Source: Soccerway

=== La Liga ===
==== League table ====
Pos	Team	Pld	W	D	L	GF	GA	GD	Pts
9	Valencia	38	13	10	15	40	45	−5	49
10	Alavés	38	12	10	16	36	46	−10	46
11	Osasuna	38	12	9	17	45	56	−11	45
12	Getafe	38	10	13	15	42	54	−12	43
13	Celta Vigo	38	10	11	17	46	57	−11	41 (Note: Celta Vigo finished ahead of Sevilla on head-to-head points: Celta Vigo 1–1 Sevilla, Sevilla 1–2 Celta Vigo.)

Source: LaLiga EA Sports
Rules for classification: 1) Points; 2) Head-to-head points; 3) Head-to-head goal difference; 4) Goal difference; 5) Goals scored; 6) Fair-play points
(Note: Head-to-head record is used only after all the matches between the teams in question have been played)

==== Results summary ====
Overall								Home						Away					
Pld	W	D	L	GF	GA	GD	Pts	W	D	L	GF	GA	GD	W	D	L	GF	GA	GD
38	12	9	17	45	56	−11	45	6	5	8	19	26	−7	6	4	9	26	30	−4

Source: La Liga

==== Results by round ====
Round	1	2	3	4	5	6	7	8	9	10	11	12	13	14	15	16	17	18	19	20	21	22	23	24	25	26	27	28	29	30	31	32	33	34	35	36	37	38
Ground	A	H	A	H	A	H	H	A	A	H	A	H	H	A	H	A	H	A	H	A	H	A	H	A	H	A	H	A	H	A	H	A	A	H	A	H	A	H
Result	W	L	W	L	L	D	L	W	L	W	L	L	D	L	D	D	W	L	W	L	W	D	L	W	W	D	W	L	L	W	L	L	L	L	D	D	W	D
Position	2	9	6	10	12	11	14	9	12	10	11	12	12	14	14	14	12	12	12	12	11	12	12	11	11	11	10	10	12	9	11	11	11	13	13	13	11	11

Source: La Liga
A = Away; H = Home; W = Win; D = Draw; L = Loss

==== Matches ====
The league fixtures were unveiled on 22 June 2023.

13 August 2023 1	Celta Vigo	0–2	Osasuna	Vigo
17:00 CEST (UTC+2)	Núñez (yellow card) 30'	Report	Ru. García 24'; Torró (yellow card) 50'; Gómez 74'	Stadium: Balaídos; Attendance: 20,269; Referee: Pablo González Fuertes

19 August 2023 2	Osasuna	0–2	Athletic Bilbao	Pamplona
21:30 CEST (UTC+2)	D. García (yellow card) 59'; Ávila (red card) 90+4'	Report	I. Williams 11'; Guruzeta 20'; Lekue (yellow card) 38'; Sancet (red card) 47'; Ruiz de Galarreta (yellow card) 71'; Simón (yellow card) 90+4'	Stadium: El Sadar; Attendance: 20,704; Referee: José Luis Munuera Montero

27 August 2023 3	Valencia	1–2	Osasuna	Valencia
19:30 CEST (UTC+2)	Correia (yellow card) 23'; Diakhaby (yellow card) 27'; Duro (yellow card) 59', (goal) 80'	Report	Oroz 24'; Barja (yellow card) 35'; Muñoz (yellow card) 62'; Budimir (yellow card) 90+1'; Moncayola (yellow card) 90+4'; Vidal 90+5'	Stadium: Mestalla; Attendance: 42,474; Referee: Juan Luis Pulido Santana

3 September 2023 4	Osasuna	1–2	Barcelona	Pamplona
21:00 CEST (UTC+2)	Areso (yellow card) 41'; Ávila 76'; Catena (red card) 84'	Report	Lewandowski (yellow card) 33', (goal) 85' (pen.); Koundé 45+1'; Gavi (yellow card) 67'; De Jong (yellow card) 83'; Balde (yellow card) 90+1'	Stadium: El Sadar; Attendance: 21,966; Referee: Miguel Ángel Ortiz Arias

17 September 2023 5	Getafe	3–2	Osasuna	Getafe
14:00 CEST (UTC+2)	Duarte (yellow card) 26'; Mitrović 36', (yellow card) 90+3'; Latasa (yellow card) 41'; Carmona 51', (yellow card) 60'; Soria (yellow card) 55'; Maksimović 86'; Djené (yellow card) 90'; Angileri (red card) 90+2'	Report	Ávila (yellow card) 38'; Muñoz 45', (yellow card) 88'; Budimir 57'	Stadium: Coliseum Alfonso Pérez; Attendance: 9,908; Referee: Alejandro Hernández Hernández

23 September 2023 6	Osasuna	0–0	Sevilla	Pamplona
16:15 CEST (UTC+2)	Budimir (yellow card) 68'; Torró (yellow card) 69'	Report	Salas (yellow card) 57'; Rakitić (yellow card) 64'; Pedrosa (yellow card) 81'	Stadium: El Sadar; Attendance: 19,670; Referee: Javier Iglesias Villanueva

28 September 2023 7	Osasuna	0–2	Atlético Madrid	Pamplona
21:30 CEST (UTC+2)	Catena (yellow card) 54'; Oroz (yellow card) 76'; Ávila (red card) 85'; Fernández (yellow card) 90'	Report	Griezmann 20'; Riquelme 81'; Morata (yellow card) 84' (yellow-red card) 85'	Stadium: El Sadar; Attendance: 20,192; Referee: Juan Martínez Munuera

1 October 2023 8	Alavés	0–2	Osasuna	Vitoria-Gasteiz
16:15 CEST (UTC+2)	Blanco (red card) 49'; Guevara (yellow card) 64'; Omorodion (yellow card) 65'	Report	Arnaiz 36'; Peña (yellow card) 43'; Cruz (yellow card) 55'; Herrera (yellow card) 71'; Budimir 90'	Stadium: Mendizorrotza; Attendance: 19,035; Referee: Jorge Figueroa Vázquez

7 October 2023 9	Real Madrid	4–0	Osasuna	Madrid
16:15 CEST (UTC+2)	Bellingham 9', 54'; Rüdiger (yellow card) 40'; Tchouaméni (yellow card) 59'; Vinícius 65'; Joselu 70', (penalty missed) 84'	Report	Barja (yellow card) 83'; Ibáñez (yellow card) 83'	Stadium: Santiago Bernabéu; Attendance: 70,864; Referee: Guillermo Cuadra Fernández

20 October 2023 10	Osasuna	2–0	Granada	Pamplona
21:00 CEST (UTC+2)	Budimir 11', 59' (pen.); Peña (yellow card) 65'; Oroz (yellow card) 79'; Ibáñez (yellow card) 84'	Report	Zaragoza (yellow card) 42'; Miquel (yellow card) 48'; Gumbau (yellow card) 54'; Ferreira (yellow card) 58'; Boyé (red card) 76'	Stadium: El Sadar; Attendance: 19,739; Referee: Mateo Busquets Ferrer

29 October 2023 11	Real Betis	2–1	Osasuna	Seville
14:00 CET (UTC+1)	Willian José 45+1'; Luiz Henrique (yellow card) 71'; Isco (yellow card) 76', (goal) 90+4'; Diao (yellow card) 90+2'	Report	D. García (yellow card) 54'; Gómez (yellow card) 80'; Catena (yellow card) 81'; Ru. García 85'; Herrera (yellow card) 90+2'	Stadium: Benito Villamarín; Attendance: 49,123; Referee: José María Sánchez Martínez

4 November 2023 12	Osasuna	2–4	Girona	Pamplona
14:00 CET (UTC+1)	Budimir 25', 55', (yellow card) 51'; Ávila (yellow card) 40'; Catena (yellow card) 41'; Torró (yellow card) 87'; Fernández (yellow card) 87'	Report	Martín 16'; Dovbyk 71'; Martínez (yellow card) 72'; Tsyhankov 80'; Herrera (yellow card) 85'; A. García 90'; Stuani (yellow card) 90+5'	Stadium: El Sadar; Attendance: 20,100; Referee: José Luis Munuera Montero

11 November 2023 13	Osasuna	1–1	Las Palmas	Pamplona
18:30 CET (UTC+1)	Budimir 73'; Catena (yellow card) 84'	Report	Moleiro 70'; Araujo (yellow card) 87'	Stadium: El Sadar; Attendance: 20,125; Referee: Jorge Figueroa Vázquez

26 November 2023 14	Villarreal	3–1	Osasuna	Villarreal
14:00 CET (UTC+1)	Morales 57', 71', 80'	Report	Catena 78'	Stadium: Estadio de la Cerámica; Attendance: 16,389; Referee: Ricardo de Burgos Bengoetxea

2 December 2023 15	Osasuna	1–1	Real Sociedad	Pamplona
21:00 CET (UTC+1)	Gómez 2'; Catena (yellow card) 58'; Budimir (yellow card) 61'; Ra. García (yellow card) 86'	Report	Sadiq 41'; Tierney (yellow card) 49'; Kubo (yellow card) 65'; Le Normand (yellow card) 84'	Stadium: El Sadar; Attendance: 20,859; Referee: Juan Luis Pulido Santana

10 December 2023 16	Cádiz	1–1	Osasuna	Cádiz
18:30 CET (UTC+1)	Roger 19'; Alejo (yellow card) 68'	Report	U. García (yellow card) 9'; Budimir 70' (pen.); Cruz (yellow card) 87'	Stadium: Nuevo Mirandilla; Attendance: 18,356; Referee: Juan Martínez Munuera

15 December 2023 17	Osasuna	1–0	Rayo Vallecano	Pamplona
21:00 CET (UTC+1)	Arnáiz (yellow card) 74'; Ra. García 90+5', (yellow card) 90+6'	Report	Espino (yellow card) 40'; Ciss (yellow card) 55'; Pérez (yellow card) 55'	Stadium: El Sadar; Attendance: 18,586; Referee: Javier Iglesias Villanueva

21 December 2023 18	Mallorca	3–2	Osasuna	Palma
21:30 CET (UTC+1)	Nastasić 12'; Raíllo (yellow card) 28', (goal) 62'; Maffeo (yellow card) 47'; Rodríguez 53'; J. Costa (yellow card) 79'	Report	Ibáñez 7'; Ra. García 90+1'; Ávila (yellow card) 90+5'	Stadium: Estadi Mallorca Son Moix; Attendance: 14,192; Referee: Mario Melero López

4 January 2024 19	Osasuna	1–0	Almería	Pamplona
17:00 CET (UTC+1)	Budimir 27'; Catena (yellow card) 89'	Report	Robertone (yellow card) 29'; Chumi (yellow card) 75'	Stadium: El Sadar; Attendance: 20,391; Referee: César Soto Grado

21 January 2024 21	Osasuna	3–2	Getafe	Pamplona
14:00 CET (UTC+1)	Ra. García 9', (yellow card) 26'; Gómez (yellow card) 29'; Muñoz 31'; D. García (yellow card) 76'; Areso 80'; Ibáñez (yellow card) 80'; Cruz (yellow card) 89'	Report	Milla (yellow card) 39'; Mayoral 64'; Maksimović 68', (yellow card) 86'; Iglesias (yellow card) 77'; Carmona (yellow card) 90+5'	Stadium: El Sadar; Attendance: 18,811; Referee: José María Sánchez Martínez

28 January 2024 22	Sevilla	1–1	Osasuna	Seville
18:30 CET (UTC+1)	Agoumé (yellow card) 6'; Romero 24'; Soumaré (yellow card) 56'; Ramos (yellow card) 84'; Suso (red card) 86'	Report	Budimir 55'	Stadium: Ramón Sánchez Pizjuán; Attendance: 36,640; Referee: Guillermo Cuadra Fernández

31 January 2024 20	Barcelona	1–0	Osasuna	Barcelona
19:00 CET (UTC+1)	Pedri (yellow card) 53'; Vitor Roque 63'	Report	U. García (yellow card) 16' (yellow-red card) 67'	Stadium: Estadi Olímpic Lluís Companys; Attendance: 37,888; Referee: Jorge Figueroa Vázquez
Note: The match was originally scheduled for 13 January 2024, but was pushed back due to both teams' involvement in the Supercopa de España.

4 February 2024 23	Osasuna	0–3	Celta Vigo	Pamplona
16:15 CET (UTC+1)	D. García (yellow card) 12'; Barja (yellow card) 84'	Report	Larsen 24'; De la Torre 25'; Douvikas 90'	Stadium: El Sadar; Attendance: 20,030; Referee: Javier Alberola Rojas

10 February 2024 24	Real Sociedad	0–1	Osasuna	San Sebastián
16:15 CET (UTC+1)		Report	Budimir 49'	Stadium: Reale Arena; Attendance: 32,905; Referee: Isidro Díaz de Mera Escuderos

17 February 2024 25	Osasuna	2–0	Cádiz	Pamplona
16:15 CET (UTC+1)	Mojica (yellow card) 26'; Oroz (yellow card) 42'; Budimir 63', 90+1'; Ibáñez (yellow card) 88'; D. García (yellow card) 90+5'	Report	Zaldúa (yellow card) 24'; Lucas Pires (yellow card) 31'	Stadium: El Sadar; Attendance: 19,525; Referee: Francisco José Hernández Maeso

25 February 2024 26	Las Palmas	1–1	Osasuna	Las Palmas
18:30 CET (UTC+1)	Suárez (yellow card) 49'; Rodríguez 52'; Coco (yellow card) 90+3'	Report	Moncayola (yellow card) 45'; U. García 49'	Stadium: Estadio Gran Canaria; Attendance: 25,075; Referee: José Luis Munuera Montero

4 March 2024 27	Osasuna	1–0	Alavés	Pamplona
21:00 CET (UTC+1)	Torró (yellow card) 16'; Herrando (yellow card) 45+1'; Budimir 76'	Report	Vicente (yellow card) 51'	Stadium: El Sadar; Attendance: 17,215; Referee: Jorge Figueroa Vázquez

9 March 2024 28	Girona	2–0	Osasuna	Girona
21:00 CET (UTC+1)	Portu 13', (yellow card) 68'; Martín (yellow card) 35'; E. García (yellow card) 58'; Sávio 86'	Report	Herrando (yellow card) 45'; Areso (yellow card) 72'; Gómez (yellow card) 90+4'	Stadium: Montilivi; Attendance: 11,598; Referee: Mateo Busquets Ferrer

16 March 2024 29	Osasuna	2–4	Real Madrid	Pamplona
16:15 CET (UTC+1)	Budimir 7'; Herrando (yellow card) 31'; Torró (yellow card) 55'; U. García (yellow card) 63'; Muñoz 90+1'	Report	Vinícius 4', 64', (yellow card) 44'; Carvajal 18'; Camavinga (yellow card) 53'; Brahim 61'	Stadium: El Sadar; Attendance: 22,430; Referee: Juan Martínez Munuera

30 March 2024 30	Almería	0–3	Osasuna	Almería
16:15 CET (UTC+1)	Baptistão (yellow card) 51'; Robertone (yellow card) 51'; Peña (yellow card) 79'	Report	Arnaiz 2', (yellow card) 37'; Budimir 9'; Areso (yellow card) 44'; Muñoz 61'	Stadium: Power Horse Stadium; Attendance: 10,565; Referee: Pablo González Fuertes

15 April 2024 31	Osasuna	0–1	Valencia	Pamplona
21:00 CEST (UTC+2)	Budimir (penalty missed) 90+7'	Report	Almeida 18'; Duro (yellow card) 56'; Mamardashvili (yellow card) 85'	Stadium: El Sadar; Attendance: 19,480; Referee: José Luis Munuera Montero

20 April 2024 32	Rayo Vallecano	2–1	Osasuna	Madrid
16:15 CEST (UTC+2)	Valentín (yellow card) 45'; Ciss (yellow card) 51'; Chavarría 80'; Palazón 84', (yellow card) 86'; López (yellow card) 90+4'	Report	Gómez 29'; Muñoz (yellow card) 48'	Stadium: Campo de Fútbol de Vallecas; Attendance: 12,617; Referee: Mario Melero López

28 April 2024 33	Granada	3–0	Osasuna	Granada
16:15 CEST (UTC+2)	Boyé (yellow card) 21', (goal) 90+4'; Jóźwiak (yellow card) 23'; Pellistri 29'; Ruiz (yellow card) 32'; Ángel (yellow card) 37'; Uzuni 48'	Report		Stadium: Nuevo Los Cármenes; Attendance: 13,825; Referee: Alejandro Muñiz Ruiz

5 May 2024 34	Osasuna	0–2	Real Betis	Pamplona
14:00 CEST (UTC+2)	U. García (yellow card) 25'; Moncayola (red card) 26'; Ra. García (yellow card) 42'	Report	Miranda (yellow card) 38'; Pérez 41'; Fornals 45+3'; Silva (yellow card) 86'	Stadium: El Sadar; Attendance: 18,300; Referee: Víctor García Verdura

11 May 2024 35	Athletic Bilbao	2–2	Osasuna	Bilbao
21:00 CEST (UTC+2)	Berchiche (yellow card) 22'; Herrera (yellow card) 45+2'; I. Williams 58'; Villalibre 90+6'	Report	Herrando (yellow card) 34'; Ra. García 40'; Ru. García 47', (yellow card) 90+2'; Ibáñez (yellow card) 55'; Catena (yellow card) 73'	Stadium: San Mamés; Attendance: 45,273; Referee: José María Sánchez Martínez

14 May 2024 36	Osasuna	1–1	Mallorca	Pamplona
19:30 CEST (UTC+2)	Moncayola 14'	Report	Mascarell (yellow card) 35'; Darder 65'	Stadium: El Sadar; Attendance: 17,852; Referee: Francisco José Hernández Maeso

19 May 2024 37	Atlético Madrid	1–4	Osasuna	Madrid
19:00 CEST (UTC+2)	Gabriel (yellow card) 35'; Morata 55'; De Paul (yellow card) 56'	Report	Ra. García 26', 64'; Oroz 52'; Catena (yellow card) 59'; Torró 88'; Muñoz (yellow card) 90+3'	Stadium: Cívitas Metropolitano; Attendance: 58,401; Referee: Pablo González Fuertes

25 May 2024 38	Osasuna	1–1	Villarreal	Pamplona
14:00 CEST (UTC+2)	Budimir 30'; Muñoz (yellow card) 34'; Peña (yellow card) 82'; Arnaiz (yellow card) 88'; U. García (yellow card) 89'	Report	Baena (yellow card) 10'; Traoré (yellow card) 40'; Morales 57'; Mosquera (yellow card) 88'	Stadium: El Sadar; Attendance: 18,385; Referee: Mario Melero López

=== Copa del Rey ===
7 January 2024 Round of 32	Castellón	0–1 (a.e.t.)	Osasuna	Castellón de la Plana
16:00 CET (UTC+1)	Alberto (yellow card) 16'; Indias (yellow card) 37'; De León (yellow card) 102'; Chirino (yellow card) 114'; Medunjanin (yellow card) 119'	Report	Torró (yellow card) 46'; Arnaiz 108'; Budimir (yellow card) 119'	Stadium: Nou Estadi Castàlia; Attendance: 14,182; Referee: José María Sánchez Martínez

17 January 2024 Round of 16	Osasuna	0–2	Real Sociedad	Pamplona
21:00 CET (UTC+1)	Catena (red card) 56'; Areso (yellow card) 57'; Fernández (yellow card) 90+6'	Report	Oyarzabal 57' (pen.); Magunazelaia (yellow card) 75'; Le Normand (yellow card) 88'; Méndez (penalty missed) 90+7'; Merino 90+7'	Stadium: El Sadar; Attendance: 21,116; Referee: Alejandro Hernández Hernández

=== Supercopa de España ===
11 January 2024 Semi-finals	Barcelona	2–0	Osasuna	Riyadh, Saudi Arabia
22:00 SAST (UTC+3)	Lewandowski 59'; Yamal 90+3'	Report	Catena (yellow card) 32'; Muñoz (yellow card) 39'; Arnaiz (yellow card) 56'	Stadium: Al-Awwal Park; Attendance: 23,932; Referee: Alejandro Muñiz Ruiz

=== UEFA Europa Conference League ===
==== Play-off round ====
The draw for the play-off round was held on 7 August 2023.

24 August 2023 First leg	Osasuna (Spain)	1–2	(Belgium) Club Brugge	Pamplona
20:30 CEST (UTC+2)	Mojica (yellow card) 30'; D. García (yellow card) 37'; Ávila 78'	Report	Buchanan (yellow card) 45+4'; Skov Olsen 50', (yellow card) 67'; Onyedika (yellow card) 51'; Thiago (yellow card) 52'; De Cuyper 80'; Mignolet (yellow card) 88'	Stadium: El Sadar; Attendance: 21,985; Referee: Benoît Millot (France)

31 August 2023 Second leg	Club Brugge (Belgium)	2–2 (4–3 agg.)	(Spain) Osasuna	Bruges, Belgium
20:00 CEST (UTC+2)	Mechele (yellow card) 10'; De Cuyper (yellow card) 30'; Skov Olsen (yellow card) 45', (goal) 76'; Vetlesen (yellow card) 71'; Thiago 73', (yellow card) 74'; Mignolet (yellow card) 90+12'	Report	Mojica 27', (yellow card) 77'; Ávila (yellow card) 30'; Gómez (yellow card) 45+1'; Moncayola (yellow card) 45+4'; Budimir 53'; Herrera (yellow card) 67'; Fernández (yellow card) 67'; D. García (yellow card) 87'; Catena (yellow card) 90+9'	Stadium: Jan Breydel Stadium; Attendance: 24,206; Referee: Daniel Stefański (Poland)
