= 2024–25 CA Osasuna season =

CA Osasuna
2024–25 season
- Head coach: Vicente Moreno
- Stadium: El Sadar Stadium
- La Liga: 9th
- Copa del Rey: Quarter-finals
- Top goalscorer: League: Ante Budimir (21); All: Ante Budimir (24)
- Average home league attendance: 20,476
Home colours	Away colours	Third colours

The 2024–25 season was the 105th season in the history of the CA Osasuna and the club's sixth consecutive season in La Liga. In addition to the domestic league, the team participated in the Copa del Rey.

On 27 May 2024, Osasuna announced Vicente Moreno as the new coach.

== Current squad ==
=== First team squad ===
As of 29 August 2024

Note: Flags indicate national team as defined under FIFA eligibility rules; some limited exceptions apply. Players may hold more than one non-FIFA nationality.

No.	Pos.	Nation	Player
1	GK	ESP	Sergio Herrera (vice-captain)
2	DF	ESP	Nacho Vidal
3	DF	ESP	Juan Cruz
4	DF	ESP	Unai García (captain)
5	DF	ESP	Jorge Herrando
6	MF	ESP	Lucas Torró
7	MF	ESP	Jon Moncayola
8	MF	ESP	Pablo Ibáñez
9	FW	ESP	Raúl García
10	MF	ESP	Aimar Oroz
11	MF	ESP	Kike Barja
12	DF	ESP	Jesús Areso
13	GK	ESP	Aitor Fernández

No.	Pos.	Nation	Player
14	MF	ESP	Rubén García
15	DF	ESP	Rubén Peña
16	MF	ESP	Moi Gómez
17	FW	CRO	Ante Budimir
18	MF	ESP	Iker Muñoz
19	FW	ESP	Bryan Zaragoza (on loan from Bayern Munich)
20	FW	ESP	José Manuel Arnáiz
21	MF	ESP	Javi Martínez
22	DF	CMR	Enzo Boyomo
23	DF	ESP	Abel Bretones
24	DF	ESP	Alejandro Catena
27	FW	ESP	Iker Benito

=== Reserve team ===
Note: Flags indicate national team as defined under FIFA eligibility rules; some limited exceptions apply. Players may hold more than one non-FIFA nationality.

No.	Pos.	Nation	Player
32	GK	GRE	Dimitrios Stamatakis

=== Out on loan ===
Note: Flags indicate national team as defined under FIFA eligibility rules; some limited exceptions apply. Players may hold more than one non-FIFA nationality.

No.	Pos.	Nation	Player
—	DF	ESP	Jorge Moreno (at Cartagena until 30 June 2025)
—	FW	ESP	Ander Yoldi (at Córdoba until 30 June 2025)

== Transfers ==
=== In ===
Pos.	Player	Transferred from	Fee	Date	Source
DF	(Spain) Abel Bretones	(Spain) Oviedo	€2,800,000	5 July 2024	
DF	(Cameroon) Flavien Enzo Boyomo	(Spain) Real Valladolid	€5,000,000	29 August 2024	

=== Out ===
Pos.	Player	Transferred to	Fee	Date	Source
DF	(Colombia) Johan Mojica	(Spain) Villarreal CF	Loan return	30 June 2024	
FW	(Spain) Iker Benito	(Spain) CD Mirandés	Loan	2 January 2025	
MF	(Spain) Javi Martínez		Contract terminated	8 January 2025	

== Friendlies ==
=== Pre-season ===
24 July 2024 Friendly	Osasuna	0–0	Huesca
19:30

25 July 2024 Friendly	Osasuna	1–1	Mirandés	Tafalla
	Iker Benito 57'		Yidne 86'	Stadium: Estadio San Francisco; Referee: Morilla Turrión

31 July 2024 Friendly	Real Sociedad	1–2	Osasuna	San Sebastián
19:00				Stadium: Instalaciones de Zubieta

3 August 2024 Euskal Txapela	Athletic Bilbao	2–1	Osasuna	Barakaldo
20:30				Stadium: Estadio de Lasesarre

10 August 2024 Friendly	Osasuna	1–2	Alavés

== Competitions ==
=== Overall record ===
Competition	First match	Last match	Starting round	Final position	Record							
Competition	First match	Last match	Starting round	Final position	Pld	W	D	L	GF	GA	GD	Win %
La Liga	17 August 2024	25 May 2025	Matchday 1	9th	38	12	16	10	48	52	−4	31.58
Copa del Rey	5 November 2024	8 April 2025	First round	Quarter-finals	5	4	0	1	13	7	+6	80.00
Total					43	16	16	11	61	59	+2	37.21

Source: Soccerway

=== La Liga ===
==== League table ====
Pos	Team	Pld	W	D	L	GF	GA	GD	Pts	Qualification or relegation
7	Celta Vigo	38	16	7	15	59	57	+2	55	Qualification for the Europa League league stage (Note: The 2024–25 Copa del Rey winner qualified for the Europa League league stage. Since the cup winners (Barcelona) qualified based on league position, the Europa League spot was passed to the seventh-placed team, and the Conference League spot was passed to the eighth-placed team.)
8	Rayo Vallecano	38	13	13	12	41	45	−4	52 (Note: Rayo Vallecano finished ahead of Osasuna on head-to-head points: Rayo Vallecano 3–1 Osasuna, Osasuna 1–1 Rayo Vallecano.)	Qualification for the Conference League play-off round
9	Osasuna	38	12	16	10	48	52	−4	52	
10	Mallorca	38	13	9	16	35	44	−9	48	
11	Real Sociedad	38	13	7	18	35	46	−11	46 (Note: Real Sociedad finished ahead of Valencia on head-to-head goal difference: Real Sociedad 3–0 Valencia, Valencia 1–0 Real Sociedad.)	

Source: LaLiga EA Sports
Rules for classification: 1) Points; 2) Head-to-head points; 3) Head-to-head goal difference; 4) Goal difference; 5) Goals scored; 6) Fair-play points
(Note: Head-to-head record is used only after all the matches between the teams in question have been played)

==== Results summary ====
Overall								Home						Away					
Pld	W	D	L	GF	GA	GD	Pts	W	D	L	GF	GA	GD	W	D	L	GF	GA	GD
33	10	14	9	40	45	−5	44	8	6	2	28	20	+8	2	8	7	12	25	−13

Last updated: 26 April 2025.

==== Results by round ====
Round	1	2	3	4	5	6	7	8	9	10	11	12	13	14	15	16	17	18	19	20	21	22	23	24	25	26	27	28	29	30	31	32	33	34
Ground	H	H	A	H	A	H	A	H	A	H	A	H	A	H	A	H	A	H	A	H	A	H	A	H	A	H	A	H	A	A	H	A	H	
Result	D	W	L	W	L	W	D	W	D	L	W	W	L	D	D	D	D	L	L	D	D	W	D	D	L	D	L	L	D	D	W	W	W	
Position	14	7	13	7	12	7	7	7	5	8	8	4	5	6	7	8	8	10	11	10	11	8	9	9	12	11	14	14	14	14	12	11	8	

Updated to match(es) played on 26 April 2025. Source: LaLiga
A = Away; H = Home; W = Win; D = Draw; L = Loss

==== Matches ====
The league schedule was released on 18 June 2024.

17 August 2024 1	Osasuna	1–1	Leganés	Pamplona
19:00	Juan Cruz (yellow card) 74'; Soriano 79' (o.g.); Herrando (yellow card) 82'; Moncayola (yellow card) 89'	Report	Cruz 22'; Rosier (yellow card) 30'; Soriano (yellow card) 61'	Stadium: El Sadar; Attendance: 19,561; Referee: Juan Luis Pulido Santana

24 August 2024 2	Osasuna	1–0	Mallorca	Pamplona
17:00	Rubén García 55'; Areso (yellow card) 75'; Herrera (yellow card) 77'	Report	Larin (yellow card) 88'	Stadium: El Sadar; Attendance: 19,900; Referee: Adrián Cordero Vega

29 August 2024 3	Girona	4–0	Osasuna	Girona
19:00	Gil 34'; Tsyhankov 53'; Ruiz 56'; Stuani 90'	Report		Stadium: Montilivi; Attendance: 13,275; Referee: Francisco José Hernández Maeso

1 September 2024 4	Osasuna	3–2	Celta Vigo	Pamplona
17:00	Boyomo 21'; Domínguez 45' (o.g.); Bretones 62'; Torró (yellow card) 66'; Rubén García (yellow card) 74'	Report	Iglesias 29'; Alfon (red card) 86'; Gómez 90+1' (o.g.)	Stadium: El Sadar; Attendance: 19.908; Referee: Juan Martínez Munuera

16 September 2024 5	Rayo Vallecano	3–1	Osasuna	Madrid
21:00	Abdul Mumin 50', (yellow card) 78'; Camello (yellow card) 59'; Rațiu 66'; López (yellow card) 88', (goal) 90+5'	Report	Zaragoza (yellow card) 19'; Vicente Moreno (yellow card) 19'; Raúl García 27'; Moncayola (yellow card) 42'	Stadium: Vallecas Stadium; Attendance: 13.073; Referee: Alejandro Quintero González

21 September 2024 6	Osasuna	2–1	Las Palmas	Pamplona
16:15	Budimir 39' (pen.); Bretones (yellow card) 54'; Oroz 60'; Peña (yellow card) 85'	Report	Sandro (yellow card) 15'; Mármol (yellow card) 35'; Moleiro 41'; Park (yellow card) 45+3'; Fábio Silva (yellow card) 78'; Januzaj (yellow card) 90+3'	Stadium: El Sadar; Attendance: 19,043; Referee: Isidro Díaz de Mera Escuderos

24 September 2024 7	Valencia	0–0	Osasuna	Valencia
19:00	Mosquera (yellow card) 45+2'; Vázquez (yellow card) 68'	Report	Torró (yellow card) 54'; Herrando (yellow card) 70'; Budimir (yellow card) 90'; V.Moreno (yellow card)	Stadium: Mestalla; Attendance: 40,425; Referee: Miguel Ángel Ortiz Arias

28 September 2024 8	Osasuna	4–2	Barcelona	Pamplona
21:00	Budimir 18', 72' (pen.); Zaragoza 28', (yellow card) 69'; Ibáñez (yellow card) 61'; Bretones 85'	Report	Víctor 53'; Domínguez (yellow card) 71'; Yamal 89'; Pedri (yellow card) 90+6'	Stadium: El Sadar; Referee: Guillermo Cuadra Fernández

5 October 2024 9	Getafe	1–1	Osasuna	Getafe
16:15	Yıldırım 21', (yellow card) 43'; Djené (yellow card) 42'	Report	Torró (yellow card) 34'; Boyomo (yellow card) 53'; Budimir 60'; Moncayola (yellow card) 75'; Catena (yellow card) 87'	Stadium: Estadio Coliseum; Attendance: 10.670; Referee: José María Sánchez Martínez

19 October 2024 10	Osasuna	1–2	Real Betis	Pamplona
16:15	Torró 59'; Boyomo (yellow card) 72'; Gómez (yellow card) 90+8'	Report	Vitor Roque 7'; Ávila 73'; Fornals (yellow card) 80'; Natan (red card) 90+5'	Stadium: El Sadar; Attendance: 21,045; Referee: Alejandro Muñiz Ruiz

27 October 2024 11	Real Sociedad	0–2	Osasuna	San Sebastián
21:00	Zubimendi (yellow card) 73'; Odriozola (yellow card) 84'; Méndez (yellow card) 90+3'	Report	Oroz (yellow card) 16'; Torró 23'; Budimir 34'; Herrera (yellow card) 45+3'; Zaragoza (yellow card) 76'; Bretones (yellow card) 90+5'	Stadium: Reale Arena; Attendance: 31,279; Referee: Juan Luis Pulido Santana

2 November 2024 12	Osasuna	1–0	Valladolid	Pamplona
14:00	Budimir 19'; Moncayola (yellow card) 77'	Report	Anuar (yellow card) 16'; L. Pérez (yellow card) 18'; K. Pérez (yellow card) 69'; Martín (yellow card) 71'; Sánchez (yellow card) 84'	Stadium: El Sadar; Attendance: 20,430; Referee: Víctor García Verdura

10 November 2024 13	Real Madrid	4–0	Osasuna	Madrid
14:00	Vinícius 34', 61', 69'; Bellingham 42'	Report	Catena (yellow card) 55'; Torró (yellow card) 88'	Stadium: Santiago Bernabéu; Attendance: 72,462; Referee: Mario Melero López

24 November 2024 14	Osasuna	2–2	Villarreal	Pamplona
14:00 CET (UTC+1)	Budimir 8', 20' (pen.); Boyomo (yellow card) 31'; Catena (yellow card) 52'; Oroz (yellow card) 75'; Areso (yellow card) 84'; Torró (yellow card) 90+1'; Herrera (yellow card) 90+2'	Report	Albiol (yellow card) 19'; Comesaña (yellow card) 39'; Baena (yellow card) 45', (goal) 67'; Cardona (yellow card) 45+1'; Parejo (yellow card) 84'; Gerard 90+3' (pen.)	Stadium: El Sadar; Attendance: 19,795; Referee: José Luis Munuera Montero

1 December 2024 15	Sevilla	1–1	Osasuna	Seville
21:00 CET (UTC+1)	Sow (yellow card) 50'; Lukebakio 72'	Report	Budimir 69'; Catena (yellow card) 80'	Stadium: Ramón Sánchez Pizjuán; Attendance: 31,536; Referee: Juan Martínez Munuera

8 December 2024 16	Osasuna	2–2	Alavés	Pamplona
21:00 CET (UTC+1)	Budimir (yellow card) 3', (goal) 54'; Torró (yellow card) 37'; Barja (yellow card) 45+4'; Rubén García 61'; Oroz (yellow card) 90+6'; Moncayola (yellow card) 90+7'	Report	K. García 1', 68'; Abqar (yellow card) 23'; Tenaglia (yellow card) 37'; Blanco (yellow card) 60'	Stadium: El Sadar; Attendance: 18,220; Referee: César Soto Grado

15 December 2024 17	Espanyol	0–0	Osasuna	Cornellà de Llobregat
14:00	Lozano (yellow card) 31'; Tejero (yellow card) 58'; Kumbulla (yellow card) 65'	Report	Catena (yellow card) 36'	Stadium: Stage Front Stadium; Attendance: 20,513; Referee: Adrián Cordero Vega

22 December 2024 18	Osasuna	1–2	Athletic Bilbao	Pamplona
18:30	Torró 25'	Report	Guruzeta 31', (yellow card) 87'; Berenguer 74'	Stadium: El Sadar; Attendance: 22.030; Referee: Alejandro Quintero González

12 January 2025 19	Atlético Madrid	1–0	Osasuna	Madrid
16:15	G.Simeone (yellow card) 34'; Lino (yellow card) 53'; Alvarez 55'; D.Simeone (yellow card) 90+2'	Report	Vicente Moreno (yellow card) 88'	Stadium: Cívitas Metropolitano; Attendance: 64.801; Referee: Isidro Díaz de Mera Escuderos

19 January 2025 20	Osasuna	1–1	Rayo Vallecano	Pamplona
18:30	Ibáñez (yellow card) 40'; Raúl García 59'; Moncayola (yellow card) 72'; Areso (yellow card) 81'	Report	Camello 19'; Valentín (yellow card) 38'; Batalla (yellow card) 84'	Stadium: El Sadar; Attendance: 20.770; Referee: Alejandro Muñiz Ruiz

24 January 2025 21	Las Palmas	1–1	Osasuna	Las Palmas
21:00	Fuster (yellow card) 11'; Essugo (yellow card) 30' (yellow-red card) 72'; Fábio Silva (yellow card) 69'; Alex Suárez (yellow card) 72'; Pelmard (yellow card) 88'; Januzaj 90+8', (yellow card) 90+10'	Report	Barja (yellow card) 19'; Areso (yellow card) 23'; Catena (yellow card) 24'; Oroz 53'; Moncayola (yellow card) 58'; Rubén García (yellow card) 82'; Herrando (yellow card) 90+1'; Muñoz (yellow card) 90+12'	Stadium: Estadio Gran Canaria; Attendance: 19.762; Referee: Jesús Gil Manzano

2 February 2025 22	Osasuna	2–1	Real Sociedad	Pamplona
18:30	Torró (yellow card) 16'; Budimir 34', 74', (yellow card) 64'; V.Moreno (yellow card) 45+1'; Herrera (yellow card) 70'	Report	Zubeldia (yellow card) 39'; Olasagasti (yellow card) 59'; Óskarsson 90+4'; Sucic (yellow card) 90+6'	Stadium: El Sadar; Attendance: 21.678; Referee: Miguel Ángel Ortiz Arias

10 February 2025 23	Mallorca	1–1	Osasuna	Palma
21 February 2025	Muriqi 81' (pen.); Maffeo (yellow card) 90'	Report	Torró (yellow card) 35'; Catena (yellow card) 79'; Boyomo (yellow card) 86', (goal) 90+4'; Oroz (yellow card) 86'	Stadium: Estadi Mallorca Son Moix; Attendance: 15.378; Referee: Adrián Cordero Vega

15 February 2025 24	Osasuna	1–1	Real Madrid	Pamplona
16:15	Areso (yellow card) 48'; Juan Cruz (yellow card) 52'; Budimir 58' (pen.); Oroz (yellow card) 73'	Report	Mbappé 15'; C.Ancelotti (yellow card) 21'; Bellingham (red card) 39'; Camavinga (yellow card) 57'	Stadium: El Sadar; Attendance: 22.390; Referee: José Luis Munuera Montero

21 February 2025 25	Celta Vigo	1–0	Osasuna	Vigo
21:00	Fer López (yellow card) 38'; Aspas 69' (pen.)	Report		Stadium: Balaídos; Attendance: 22.005; Referee: José María Sánchez Martínez

2 March 2025 26	Osasuna	3–3	Valencia	Pamplona
21:00	Oroz 26', 39'; Budimir 45' (pen.); Torró (yellow card) 77'; Muñoz (yellow card) 80'	Report	López 14'; Sadiq 32', 87'; Rioja (yellow card) 68'	Stadium: El Sadar; Attendance: 19.230; Referee: Mario Melero López

16 March 2025 28	Osasuna	1–2	Getafe	Pamplona
18:30	Areso (yellow card) 15'; Torró (yellow card) 34'; Budimir 45' (pen.)	Report	Djené (yellow card) 29'; Duarte (yellow card) 43'; Terrats 55', 71'; Chrisantus (yellow card) 76' (yellow-red card) 77'	Stadium: El Sadar; Attendance: 19.611; Referee: Alejandro Hernández Hernández

27 March 2025 27	Barcelona	3–0	Osasuna	Barcelona
21:00 CET (UTC+1)		Report		Stadium: Estadi Olímpic Lluís Companys; Referee: Mateo Busquets Ferrer
Note: This match was originally scheduled for 8 March 2025; however, it was rescheduled due to the death of Barcelona's doctor Carles Miñarro Garcia.

30 March 2024 29	Athletic Bilbao	0–0	Osasuna	Bilbao
18:30	Núñez (yellow card) 38'	Report	Catena (yellow card) 45'	Stadium: San Mamés; Attendance: 49.671; Referee: Guillermo Cuadra Fernández

7 April 2025 30	Leganés	1–1	Osasuna	Leganés
21:00 UTC+1	Neyou (yellow card) 55'; Rosier (yellow card) 61'; Raba (yellow card) 62', (goal) 87' (pen.)	Report	Oroz (yellow card) 45+1'; Herrando 49'; Moncayola (yellow card) 72'; Bretones (yellow card) 86'	Stadium: Estadio Municipal de Butarque; Attendance: 10.755; Referee: Víctor García Verdura

13 April 2025 31	Osasuna	2–1	Girona	Pamplona
14:00	Budimir 38'; Ibáñez 79'; Barja (yellow card) 86'; Cruz (yellow card) 89'	Report	Stuani (yellow card) 73'; Asprilla 90+6'	Stadium: El Sadar; Attendance: 20.260; Referee: Pablo González Fuertes

20 April 2025 32	Valladolid	2–3	Osasuna	Valladolid
14:00	Moro 49'; Sylla 66' (pen.); Javi (yellow card) 79'; Aznou (yellow card) 90+1'	Report	Budimir 9', 60' (pen.); Rubén García 34'	Stadium: José Zorrilla; Attendance: 12.230; Referee: Jesús Gil Manzano

23 April 2025 33	Osasuna	1–0	Sevilla	Pamplona
--:--				Stadium: El Sadar

4 May 2025 34	Villarreal	4–2	Osasuna	Villarreal
--:--				Stadium: Estadio de la Cerámica

11 May 2025 35	Real Betis	1–1	Osasuna	Seville

15 May 2025 37	Osasuna	2–0	Atlético Madrid	Pamplona

18 May 2025 37	Osasuna	2–0	Espanyol	Pamplona
	Budimir 17' Areso (yellow card) 81'		Garcia 90+1' Kumbulla (yellow card) 30'	Stadium: El Sadar; Attendance: 21,131; Referee: Francisco Jose Hernandez

25 May 2025 38	Alavés	1–1	Osasuna	Vitoria-Gasteiz
20:00	Vicente 56' (pen.)	Report	Raúl García 88'	Stadium: Mendizorrotza; Attendance: 19,274; Referee: Guillermo Cuadra Fernández

=== Copa del Rey ===
5 November 2024 First round	Chiclana CF	0–5	Osasuna	Chiclana
19:00 UTC+1	Juanito (yellow card) 44'	Report	García 51', 79'; Benito 53' (pen.); Arnáiz 71'; Moi Gómez 76'	Stadium: Municipal de Deportes de Chiclana; Attendance: 5.000; Referee: Francisco José Hernández Maeso
Note: The match was originally scheduled to take place on 30 October 2024, but was postponed due to the poor condition of the pitch.

5 December 2024 Second round	AD Ceuta FC	2–3	Osasuna	Ceuta
19:00	J.Romero (yellow card) 38'; Redru 41'; C.Hernández (yellow card) 54'; Díez 69'	Report	Budimir 84'; García 87'; Redru 90+3' (o.g.); Barja (yellow card) 90+8'	Stadium: Estadio Municipal Alfonso Murube; Referee: Alejandro Hernández Hernández

4 January 2025 Round of 32	CD Tenerife	1–2	Osasuna	Santa Cruz de Tenerife
16:00	José León 45'; Moreno (yellow card) 55'; A.Rodríguez (yellow card) 80'; Bodiger (yellow card) 85'; Manjam (yellow card) 90+1'	Report	Herrando 7'; José León 25' (o.g.); Moncayola (yellow card) 43'; Boyomo (yellow card) 48'; Budimir (yellow card) 90+2'	Stadium: Heliodoro Rodríguez López; Attendance: 16.602; Referee: Juan Martínez Munuera

16 January 2025 Round of 16	Athletic Bilbao	2–3	Osasuna	Bilbao
19:30	Williams 45+3'; Óscar 55'; Jauregizar (yellow card) 84'	Report	Oroz 40'; Budimir 44' (pen.), 70'; Moncayola (yellow card) 45+3'; Catena (yellow card) 49'; Areso (yellow card) 90+4'	Stadium: San Mamés; Attendance: 48.230; Referee: Mateo Busquets Ferrer

6 February 2025 Quarter-finals	Real Sociedad	2–0	Osasuna	San Sebastián
19:30	Barrenetxea 21'; Méndez 31'; Oyarzabal (yellow card) 45+1'; Muñoz (yellow card) 87'; Aguerd (yellow card) 90+3'	Report	Catena (red card) 35'; Oroz (yellow card) 45+1'; Moncayola (yellow card) 45+5'; Herrera (yellow card) 45+6'; Ibáñez (yellow card) 77'; Areso (yellow card) 80'	Stadium: Reale Arena; Attendance: 34.658; Referee: Mario Melero López
