= 2023–24 Real Madrid CF season =

Real Madrid
2023–24 season
- President: Florentino Pérez
- Head coach: Carlo Ancelotti
- Stadium: Santiago Bernabéu
- La Liga: 1st
- Copa del Rey: Round of 16
- Supercopa de España: Winners
- UEFA Champions League: Winners
- Top goalscorer: League: Jude Bellingham (19); All: Vinícius Júnior (24)
- Highest home attendance: 77,981 vs Barcelona
- Lowest home attendance: 65,017 vs Las Palmas
- Average home league attendance: 72,061
- Biggest win: 5–0 vs Alavés
- Biggest defeat: 2–4 vs Atlético Madrid; 1–3 vs Atlético Madrid
Home colours	Away colours	Third colours

The 2023–24 season was Real Madrid Club de Fútbol's 120th season in existence and the club's 93rd consecutive season in the top flight of Spanish football. In addition to the domestic league, Real Madrid participated in this season's editions of the Copa del Rey, the Supercopa de España and the UEFA Champions League.

On the domestic front, Madrid delivered the Supercopa de España trophy, beating Barcelona 4–1 in the final to win their 13th title in the competition, and conquered a record-extending 36th La Liga championship with four games to spare. These two trophies also marked Carlo Ancelotti's 11th and 12th in charge of Real Madrid, overtaking Zinedine Zidane's tally to make the Italian the second most successful manager in the club's history. In the Champions League, Madrid beat Borussia Dortmund 2–0 in the final to a record-extending 15th European Cup, with Dani Carvajal, Toni Kroos, Luka Modrić and Nacho equalling Paco Gento’s record of six European Cup titles, as Ancelotti won his fifth trophy in the tournament, the most among the managers. Real also claimed their fifth ever European double (after 1956–57, 1957–58, 2016–17, and 2021–22). The team only suffered two defeats throughout the whole season, both of them against city rivals Atlético Madrid at the Cívitas Metropolitano.

This season was the first since 2008–09 to not feature Karim Benzema, who departed to Saudi Arabian club Al-Ittihad and the first since 2015–16 without Marco Asensio, who left Los Merengues to join French side Paris Saint-Germain.

== Summary ==
=== Pre-season ===
On 3 June, at the end of the 2022–23 season, Madrid announced the departure of Marco Asensio with the player having spent seven seasons playing for Los Blancos. On the same day, the club said goodbye to Mariano and Eden Hazard. The following day, Madrid announced an agreement with Karim Benzema for the club captain to depart in the summer after 14 years of service, with the Frenchman leaving the club as the joint-most decorated player in Real's history, having won 25 trophies. On 9 June, Madrid confirmed the return of the former club's academy player, Fran García, triggering the release clause to sign him from Rayo Vallecano on a four-year contract. The next day, Madrid announced that Brahim Díaz will be part of the first team for the 2023–24 season, additionally extending his contract until 2027. On 14 June, Madrid announced the signing of young midfielder Jude Bellingham from Borussia Dortmund, penning a six-year deal with the Englishman. Five days later, Madrid brought back another club's youth academy product, signing Joselu on a one-year loan from Espanyol. On 21 June, Toni Kroos renewed his contract with the club until 2024. The next day, Madrid announced that the club's new captain, Nacho, had extended his contract for one more season, keeping him at Real until 2024. On 23 June, Dani Ceballos extended until 2027. Three days later, Madrid and Luka Modrić agreed on a one-season extension, with the Croatian signing a contract until 2024. On 6 July, Madrid announced the signing of Arda Güler from Fenerbahçe, agreeing a six-year deal with the Turkish talent. On 15 July, Jesús Vallejo joined Granada on a season-long loan.

=== August ===
On 12 August, Madrid started their 2023–24 campaign with a 2–0 El Viejo Clásico win at the San Mamés, beating Athletic Bilbao in the first matchday of La Liga with a strike from Rodrygo and Bellingham's debut goal. Two days later, following Thibaut Courtois' ACL injury, Madrid signed Kepa Arrizabalaga from Chelsea as his replacement on a season-long loan deal. On 19 August, Madrid took on Almería on the road and managed to get a 3–1 win, thanks to a brace from Bellingham and a goal from Vinícius Júnior. Six days later, a late Bellingham header helped Madrid to obtain a narrow 1–0 away win against Celta Vigo and continue their perfect league start.

=== September ===
On 1 September, the deadline day of the summer transfer window, Álvaro Odriozola returned to Real Sociedad on a permanent basis. The following day, a close-range goal from Joselu and Bellingham's injury time winner gave Ancelotti's side a 2–1 comeback win over Getafe in their first league game of the season at the Santiago Bernabéu. After the international break, on 17 September, second-half goals from Federico Valverde and Joselu earned Madrid a 2–1 home win over Real Sociedad, extending the team's winning run to five games. Three days later, another late winner from Bellingham clinched Madrid a 1–0 win against Union Berlin in the first matchday of the Champions League. On 24 September, Ancelotti's side suffered their first defeat in the season, as the away Madrid derby match against Atlético Madrid ended in a 1–3 loss, with the team's only goal coming from Kroos. Three days later, Madrid defeated Las Palmas 2–0 at home, as Brahim and Joselu got on the scoresheet. The last match of September ended in another win for Real after they beat Girona 3–0 away on 30 September to reclaim the league's first place, courtesy of goals from Joselu, Aurélien Tchouaméni, a debut one for the Frenchman, and Bellingham.

=== October ===
On 3 October, finishes from Vinícius and Bellingham, as well as an own goal, got Madrid a 3–2 turnaround win over Napoli at the Stadio Diego Armando Maradona in their second Champions League match of the season. Four days later, Osasuna was beaten 4–0 at home, thanks to a brace from Bellingham and goals from Vinícius and Joselu. After another international break, Madrid returned to play on 21 October with a 1–1 away draw against Sevilla, as Dani Carvajal got on the scoresheet. Three days later, Madrid faced Braga away from home in the Champions League, beating the Portuguese side 2–1 with goals from Rodrygo and Bellingham. On 28 October, Bellingham scored two goals to give Madrid a late 2–1 comeback victory over Barcelona at the Olímpic Lluís Companys in the first El Clásico of the season. Three days later, Vinícius prolongated his agreement with the club through 2027.

=== November ===
On 2 November, Madrid announced that Rodrygo had renewed his contract until 2028. Three days later, Madrid's home game versus Rayo Vallecano ended in a 0–0 stalemate. On 7 November, Eduardo Camavinga extended until 2029. The next day, Champions League goals from Brahim, Vinícius and Rodrygo qualified Madrid to the knockout phase, as Ancelotti's side defeated Braga 3–0 at the Santiago Bernabéu. On 9 November, Valverde signed a contract extension until 2029. On 11 November, an early Carvajal goal and braces from Vinícius and Rodrygo gave Madrid a smashing 5–1 victory over Valencia at home. On 26 November, Madrid's away league game versus Cádiz ended in a 3–0 win with a Rodrygo brace and a goal from Bellingham. Three days later, Madrid secured the first spot in their Champions League group with a 4–2 win against Napoli, as first-half strikes from Rodrygo and Bellingham were followed up by the debut goal from Castilla's Nico Paz and Joselu's close-range shot.

=== December ===
Ancelotti's side started the month with a win, beating Granada 2–0 on 2 December, with goals from Brahim and Rodrygo. A week later, Madrid took on Real Betis, but was unable to take three points, as Bellingham's goal gave his team a 1–1 draw. On 12 December, a brace from Joselu and Ceballos' goal helped Madrid to get a 3–2 win over Union Berlin and a perfect result in the Champions League group stage for the third time in the club's history. Five days later, Madrid's last 2023 game at the Bernabéu ended in a 4–1 victory over Villarreal, as Bellingham, Rodrygo, Brahim and Modrić got on the scoresheet. On 21 December, a Lucas Vázquez header in injury time gave Madrid a 1–0 win over Alavés to end the year as the league leaders. Eight days later, Ancelotti renewed his contract until 2026.

=== January ===
On 3 January, Madrid started off 2024 by beating Mallorca 1–0 at the Bernabéu, thanks to a late headed goal by Antonio Rüdiger. Three days later, goals from Joselu, Brahim and Rodrygo helped Madrid to get a 3–1 Copa del Rey win over Arandina and progress to the round of 16. On 10 January, the first 2024 Supercopa de España semi-final ended in favor of Real, as goals from Rüdiger, Ferland Mendy and Carvajal helped Madrid reach extra time, where a deflected header from Joselu and Brahim's long-range shot on an empty net gave their team a 5–3 win over Atlético Madrid. Four days later, the Brazilian duo of Vinícius and Rodrygo scored all goals in Madrid's 4–1 victory over El Clásico rivals Barcelona, with the former getting his second career hat-trick to help Real conquer their 13th Spanish Super Cup title. On 19 January, two late goals in extra time from Atlético Madrid saw Ancelotti's side being eliminated from the Copa Del Rey 2–4 away, as one own goal and one from Joselu were not enough in a second loss at the Metropolitano Stadium. Three days later, Madrid won 3–2 after being down by two goals against Almería at half-time, with the goals coming from Bellingham and Vinícius, as well as a stoppage time winner by Carvajal. On 24 January, Éder Militão signed a contract extension until 2028. Three days later, Madrid beat Las Palmas 2–1 away, with a goal from Vinícius and a late winner by Tchouaméni.

=== February ===
On 1 February, a brace from Joselu gave Madrid a 2–0 away victory over Getafe in the first game of the month. Three days later, another match against Atlético Madrid ended in a 1–1 draw at the Bernabéu, as Brahim's first-half goal was cancelled out by a late equaliser. On 10 February, Madrid won 4–0 over Girona at home to strengthen their lead in the league, through goals from Vinícius and Rodrygo, as well as a brace from Bellingham. Three days later, a wondergoal from Brahim was enough to beat Champions League round of 16 opponents RB Leipzig 1–0 in the first leg. On 18 February, Madrid was halted by Rayo Vallecano to a 1–1 draw away, with Joselu getting on the scoresheet. Seven days later, Sevilla was defeated 1–0 at Bernabéu, courtesy of a late strike from Modrić.

=== March ===
The month started for Madrid with a 2–2 away draw against Valencia on 2 March, as Vinícius got a brace. Five days later, Vinícius scored his team's goal in the 1–1 home draw of the Champions League second leg against RB Leipzig, prevailing Madrid to the quarter-finals. On 10 March, Madrid beat Celta Vigo 4–0 at home, with strikes from Vinícius and Güler, a debut one for the Turk, as well as two own goals. Six days later, Madrid beat Osasuna 4–2 away, as Vinícius got on the scoresheet twice alongside Carvajal and Brahim. On 31 March, Madrid concluded the month at home with Rodrygo's brace sealing a 2–0 victory against Athletic Bilbao. The match also saw the return of Militão from his ACL injury.

=== April ===
On 9 April, Madrid opened the month with the first leg of the Champions League quarter-finals tie against Manchester City at home, as an own goal and strikes from Rodrygo and Valverde helped Real to end the match in a thrilling 3–3 draw. Four days later, a lone goal from outside the box by Tchouaméni gave Madrid a 1–0 win at Mallorca. On 17 April, Rodrygo's goal was enough to see Madrid hold Manchester City to a 1–1 draw at the City of Manchester Stadium in the second leg of the Champions League quarter-finals, sending the tie to extra time and ultimately penalty shootout, where Ancelotti's side prevailed 4–3 to book their place in the semi-finals. Four days later, Madrid managed to get a 3–2 victory over Barcelona at the Santiago Bernabéu with the help of goals from Vinícius and Vázquez and a stoppage time winner from Bellingham, sealing their third El Clásico win in a row this season, for the first time since 1935–36. On 26 April, Madrid's away game against Real Sociedad ended in a 1–0 win, as Güler scored on his first La Liga start. Four days later, a double from Vinícius earned Madrid a 2–2 away draw against Bayern Munich in the first game of the Champions League semi-finals, which was the first European Clásico for Real since the 2017–18 encounter.

=== May ===
Madrid started the month with a home match against Cádiz on 4 May, as second-half goals from Brahim, Bellingham and Joselu gave Real a 3–0 win. This game also marked Courtois' first appearance of the season after recovering from his knee injuries. On the same day, with Girona beating Barcelona 4–2, Madrid were crowned La Liga champions for the record-extending 36th time. On 8 May, Madrid faced Bayern Munich in the reverse leg of the Champions League semi-finals at the Santiago Bernabéu. Trailing 0–1 in the 87th minute, a late brace from Joselu gave his team a 2–1 win in the match and 4–3 on aggregate to send Real to the final for the sixth time in eleven years, knocking the German side out for the fourth time in a row. Three days later, Madrid took on already-relegated Granada, winning 4–0, as García's debut goal for the club was followed up by a finish from Güler and a brace from Brahim. On 14 May, an early opener from Bellingham with Vinícius' brace and goals from Valverde and Güler gave Ancelotti's side a crushing 5–0 win over Alavés, as Madrid kept a club record 20th clean sheet in this La Liga campaign. Five days later, Madrid gave up a three-goal lead away to Villarreal at the Estadio de la Cerámica, the match ending in a 4–4 draw, with goals from Vázquez, Joselu, and a double from Güler. On 25 May, in the season's last league game, Madrid drew Real Betis 0–0, as Kroos bid a farewell to the Bernabéu.

=== June ===
Madrid's only game of the month and their last match of the season was the Champions League final at the Wembley Stadium against Borussia Dortmund. A header from Carvajal and a strike from Vinícius late in the second half prevailed Los Blancos to a 2–0 win, as they clinched a record-extending 15th European Cup, their sixth in eleven years, Ancelotti's third in charge and fifth overall, the most among the managers, with Carvajal, Kroos, Modrić and Nacho equalling Paco Gento’s record of six European Cup titles and surpassing the former trio consisting of Karim Benzema, Gareth Bale, and Cristiano Ronaldo. Additionally, Modrić and Nacho won their 26th title in Real Madrid to become the players with the most trophies in the history of the club, surpassing Benzema and Marcelo.

== Kits ==
Home	Away	Third	2022–23 away (Note: Only worn in the away match against Valencia.)	Goalkeeper 1	Goalkeeper 2	Goalkeeper 3

== Players ==
Note: Flags indicate national team as defined under FIFA eligibility rules; some limited exceptions apply. Players may hold more than one non-FIFA nationality.

No.	Pos.	Nation	Player
1	GK	BEL	Thibaut Courtois
2	DF	ESP	Dani Carvajal
3	DF	BRA	Éder Militão
4	DF	AUT	David Alaba
5	MF	ENG	Jude Bellingham
6	DF	ESP	Nacho Fernández (captain)
7	FW	BRA	Vinícius Júnior
8	MF	GER	Toni Kroos
10	MF	CRO	Luka Modrić (vice-captain)
11	FW	BRA	Rodrygo
12	MF	FRA	Eduardo Camavinga
13	GK	UKR	Andriy Lunin

No.	Pos.	Nation	Player
14	FW	ESP	Joselu (on loan from Espanyol)
15	MF	URU	Federico Valverde
16	DF	ESP	Álvaro Odriozola (until 1 September 2023)
17	DF	ESP	Lucas Vázquez
18	MF	FRA	Aurélien Tchouaméni
19	MF	ESP	Dani Ceballos
20	DF	ESP	Fran García
21	FW	MAR	Brahim Díaz
22	DF	GER	Antonio Rüdiger
23	DF	FRA	Ferland Mendy
24	MF	TUR	Arda Güler
25	GK	ESP	Kepa Arrizabalaga (on loan from Chelsea)

== Transfers ==
=== In ===
Date	Pos.	Player	From	Type	Ref.
1 July 2023	DF	(Spain) Fran García	Rayo Vallecano	Transfer	
1 July 2023	MF	(England) Jude Bellingham	(Germany) Borussia Dortmund	Transfer	
1 July 2023	FW	(Morocco) Brahim Díaz	(Italy) Milan	End of loan	
1 July 2023	FW	(Spain) Joselu	Espanyol	Loan	
6 July 2023	MF	(Turkey) Arda Güler	(Turkey) Fenerbahçe	Transfer	
14 August 2023	GK	(Spain) Kepa Arrizabalaga	(England) Chelsea	Loan	

=== Out ===
Date	Pos.	Player	To	Type	Ref.
1 July 2023	FW	(Spain) Marco Asensio	(France) Paris Saint-Germain	End of contract	
1 July 2023	FW	(France) Karim Benzema	(Saudi Arabia) Al-Ittihad	End of contract	
1 July 2023	FW	(Belgium) Eden Hazard	Retired		
1 July 2023	FW	(Dominican Republic) Mariano	Sevilla	End of contract	
15 July 2023	DF	(Spain) Jesús Vallejo	Granada	Loan	
1 September 2023	DF	(Spain) Álvaro Odriozola	Real Sociedad	Transfer	

=== Contract renewals ===
Date	Pos.	Player	Contract length	Contract ends	Ref.
10 June 2023	FW	(Morocco) Brahim Díaz	Two years	2027	
21 June 2023	MF	(Germany) Toni Kroos	One year	2024	
22 June 2023	DF	(Spain) Nacho	One year	2024	
23 June 2023	MF	(Spain) Dani Ceballos	Four years	2027	
26 June 2023	MF	(Croatia) Luka Modrić	One year	2024	
31 October 2023	FW	(Brazil) Vinícius Júnior	Three years	2027	
2 November 2023	FW	(Brazil) Rodrygo	Three years	2028	
7 November 2023	MF	(France) Eduardo Camavinga	Two years	2029	
9 November 2023	MF	(Uruguay) Federico Valverde	Two years	2029	
23 January 2024	DF	(Brazil) Éder Militão	Three years	2028	

== Pre-season and friendlies ==
On 13 May 2023, Real Madrid announced they would travel to the United States to participate in the pre-season Soccer Champions Tour for the second time since last year's summer activity.

23 July 2023 1	Real Madrid	3–2	Milan	Pasadena, United States
19:10 UTC−7	Valverde 57', 59'; Vinícius 84'	Report	Tomori 25'; Romero 42'	Stadium: Rose Bowl; Attendance: 70,814; Referee: Timothy Ford (United States)

26 July 2023 2	Real Madrid	2–0	Manchester United	Houston, United States
19:36 UTC−5	Bellingham 6'; Joselu 89'	Report		Stadium: NRG Stadium; Attendance: 67,801; Referee: Lukasz Szpala (United States)

29 July 2023 3	Barcelona	3–0	Real Madrid	Arlington, United States
16:06 UTC−5	Dembélé 15'; Fermín 85'; Torres 90+1'	Report		Stadium: AT&T Stadium; Attendance: 82,026; Referee: Allen Chapman (United States)

2 August 2023 4	Juventus	3–1	Real Madrid	Orlando, United States
19:38 UTC−4	Kean 1'; Weah 20'; Vlahović 90+5'	Report	Vinícius 38'	Stadium: Camping World Stadium; Attendance: 63,503; Referee: Ismail Elfath (United States)

== Competitions ==
=== Overview ===
Competition	First match	Last match	Starting round	Final position	Record							
Competition	First match	Last match	Starting round	Final position	Pld	W	D	L	GF	GA	GD	Win %
La Liga	12 August 2023	25 May 2024	Matchday 1	Winners	38	29	8	1	87	26	+61	76.32
Copa del Rey	6 January 2024	18 January 2024	Round of 32	Round of 16	2	1	0	1	5	5	+0	50.00
Supercopa de España	10 January 2024	14 January 2024	Semi-finals	Winners	2	2	0	0	9	4	+5	100.00
UEFA Champions League	20 September 2023	1 June 2024	Group stage	Winners	13	9	4	0	28	15	+13	69.23
Total					55	41	12	2	129	50	+79	74.55

Source: Soccerway

=== La Liga ===
==== League table ====
Pos	Team	Pld	W	D	L	GF	GA	GD	Pts	Qualification or relegation
1	Real Madrid (C)	38	29	8	1	87	26	+61	95	Qualification for the Champions League league phase
2	Barcelona	38	26	7	5	79	44	+35	85	Qualification for the Champions League league phase
3	Girona	38	25	6	7	85	46	+39	81	Qualification for the Champions League league phase
4	Atlético Madrid	38	24	4	10	70	43	+27	76	Qualification for the Champions League league phase
5	Athletic Bilbao	38	19	11	8	61	37	+24	68	Qualification for the Europa League league phase (Note: Since the winners of the 2023–24 Copa del Rey, Athletic Bilbao, qualified for European competition based on league position, the Europa League berth awarded to the Copa del Rey winners was passed to the sixth-placed team, and the Conference League berth awarded to the sixth-placed team was passed to the seventh-placed team.)

Source: LaLiga EA Sports
Rules for classification: 1) Points; 2) Head-to-head points; 3) Head-to-head goal difference; 4) Goal difference; 5) Goals scored; 6) Fair-play points
(Note: Head-to-head record is used only after all the matches between the teams in question have been played)
(C) Champions

==== Results summary ====
Overall								Home						Away					
Pld	W	D	L	GF	GA	GD	Pts	W	D	L	GF	GA	GD	W	D	L	GF	GA	GD
38	29	8	1	87	26	+61	95	16	3	0	48	9	+39	13	5	1	39	17	+22

Source: La Liga

==== Results by round ====
Round	1	2	3	4	5	6	7	8	9	10	11	12	13	14	15	16	17	18	19	20	21	22	23	24	25	26	27	28	29	30	31	32	33	34	35	36	37	38
Ground	A	A	A	H	H	A	H	A	H	A	A	H	H	A	H	A	H	A	H	H	A	A	H	H	A	H	A	H	A	H	A	H	A	H	A	H	A	H
Result	W	W	W	W	W	L	W	W	W	D	W	D	W	W	W	D	W	W	W	W	W	W	D	W	D	W	D	W	W	W	W	W	W	W	W	W	D	D
Position	3	1	1	1	1	3	2	1	1	1	1	2	2	1	1	2	2	1	1	1	1	1	1	1	1	1	1	1	1	1	1	1	1	1	1	1	1	1

Source: La Liga
A = Away; H = Home; W = Win; D = Draw; L = Loss

==== Matches ====
The league fixtures were announced on 22 June 2023.

12 August 2023 1	Athletic Bilbao	0–2	Real Madrid	Bilbao
21:30 UTC+2		Report	Rodrygo 28'; Bellingham 36'	Stadium: San Mamés; Attendance: 48,927; Referee: Jesús Gil Manzano

19 August 2023 2	Almería	1–3	Real Madrid	Almería
19:30 UTC+2	Arribas 3'	Report	Bellingham 19', 60'; Vinícius 73'	Stadium: Power Horse Stadium; Attendance: 17,561; Referee: José María Sánchez Martínez

25 August 2023 3	Celta Vigo	0–1	Real Madrid	Vigo
21:30 UTC+2		Report	Bellingham 81'	Stadium: ABANCA Balaídos; Attendance: 23,057; Referee: Isidro Díaz de Mera Escuderos

2 September 2023 4	Real Madrid	2–1	Getafe	Madrid
16:15 UTC+2	Joselu 47'; Bellingham 90+5'	Report	Mayoral 11'	Stadium: Santiago Bernabéu; Attendance: 66,747; Referee: Mario Melero López

17 September 2023 5	Real Madrid	2–1	Real Sociedad	Madrid
21:00 UTC+2	Valverde 46'; Joselu 60'	Report	Barrenetxea 5'	Stadium: Santiago Bernabéu; Attendance: 70,092; Referee: César Soto Grado

24 September 2023 6	Atlético Madrid	3–1	Real Madrid	Madrid
21:00 UTC+2	Morata 4', 46'; Griezmann 18'	Report	Kroos 35'	Stadium: Cívitas Metropolitano; Attendance: 69,082; Referee: Javier Alberola Rojas

27 September 2023 7	Real Madrid	2–0	Las Palmas	Madrid
19:00 UTC+2	Brahim 45+3'; Joselu 54'	Report		Stadium: Santiago Bernabéu; Attendance: 65,017; Referee: José Luis Munuera Montero

30 September 2023 8	Girona	0–3	Real Madrid	Girona
18:30 UTC+2		Report	Joselu 17'; Tchouaméni 21'; Bellingham 71'; Nacho (red card) 90+4'	Stadium: Montilivi; Attendance: 14,184; Referee: Juan Luis Pulido Santana

7 October 2023 9	Real Madrid	4–0	Osasuna	Madrid
16:15 UTC+2	Bellingham 9', 54'; Vinícius 65'; Joselu 70'	Report		Stadium: Santiago Bernabéu; Attendance: 70,864; Referee: Guillermo Cuadra Fernández

21 October 2023 10	Sevilla	1–1	Real Madrid	Seville
18:30 UTC+2	Alaba 74' (o.g.)	Report	Carvajal 78'	Stadium: Ramón Sánchez Pizjuán; Attendance: 41,212; Referee: Ricardo de Burgos Bengoetxea

28 October 2023 11	Barcelona	1–2	Real Madrid	Barcelona
16:15 UTC+2	Gündoğan 6'	Report	Bellingham 68', 90+2'	Stadium: Olímpic Lluís Companys; Attendance: 50,112; Referee: Jesús Gil Manzano

5 November 2023 12	Real Madrid	0–0	Rayo Vallecano	Madrid
21:00 UTC+1		Report		Stadium: Santiago Bernabéu; Attendance: 70,220; Referee: Juan Martínez Munuera

11 November 2023 13	Real Madrid	5–1	Valencia	Madrid
21:00 UTC+1	Carvajal 3'; Vinícius 42', 49'; Rodrygo 50', 84'	Report	Duro 88'	Stadium: Santiago Bernabéu; Attendance: 72,475; Referee: José María Sánchez Martínez

26 November 2023 14	Cádiz	0–3	Real Madrid	Cádiz
18:30 UTC+1		Report	Rodrygo 14', 64'; Bellingham 74'	Stadium: Nuevo Mirandilla; Attendance: 20,325; Referee: Guillermo Cuadra Fernández

2 December 2023 15	Real Madrid	2–0	Granada	Madrid
18:30 UTC+1	Brahim 26'; Rodrygo 57'	Report		Stadium: Santiago Bernabéu; Attendance: 70,685; Referee: Pablo González Fuertes

9 December 2023 16	Real Betis	1–1	Real Madrid	Seville
16:15 UTC+1	Ruibal 66'	Report	Bellingham 53'	Stadium: Benito Villamarín; Attendance: 52,756; Referee: César Soto Grado

17 December 2023 17	Real Madrid	4–1	Villarreal	Madrid
21:00 UTC+1	Bellingham 25'; Rodrygo 37'; Brahim 64'; Modrić 68'	Report	Morales 54'	Stadium: Santiago Bernabéu; Attendance: 70,500; Referee: Jorge Figueroa Vázquez

21 December 2023 18	Alavés	0–1	Real Madrid	Vitoria-Gasteiz
21:30 UTC+1		Report	Nacho (red card) 54'; Vázquez 90+2'	Stadium: Mendizorrotza; Attendance: 19,275; Referee: Isidro Díaz de Mera Escuderos

3 January 2024 19	Real Madrid	1–0	Mallorca	Madrid
19:15 UTC+1	Rüdiger 78'	Report		Stadium: Santiago Bernabéu; Attendance: 72,394; Referee: Alejandro Muñiz Ruiz

21 January 2024 20	Real Madrid	3–2	Almería	Madrid
16:15 UTC+1	Bellingham 57' (pen.); Vinícius 67'; Carvajal 90+9'	Report	Ramazani 1'; González 43'	Stadium: Santiago Bernabéu; Attendance: 72,044; Referee: Francisco Hernández Maeso

27 January 2024 21	Las Palmas	1–2	Real Madrid	Las Palmas
16:15 UTC+1	Muñoz 53'	Report	Vinícius 65'; Tchouaméni 84'	Stadium: Gran Canaria; Attendance: 32,037; Referee: César Soto Grado

1 February 2024 22	Getafe	0–2	Real Madrid	Getafe
21:00 UTC+1		Report	Joselu 14', 56'	Stadium: Coliseum; Attendance: 15,264; Referee: Ricardo de Burgos Bengoetxea
Note: The match date was pushed back due to Madrid's involvement in the Supercopa de España.

4 February 2024 23	Real Madrid	1–1	Atlético Madrid	Madrid
21:00 UTC+1	Brahim 20'	Report	Llorente 90+3'	Stadium: Santiago Bernabéu; Attendance: 76,732; Referee: José María Sánchez Martínez

10 February 2024 24	Real Madrid	4–0	Girona	Madrid
18:30 UTC+1	Vinícius 6'; Bellingham 35', 54'; Rodrygo 61'	Report		Stadium: Santiago Bernabéu; Attendance: 76,585; Referee: Juan Martínez Munuera

18 February 2024 25	Rayo Vallecano	1–1	Real Madrid	Madrid
14:00 UTC+1	De Tomás 27' (pen.)	Report	Joselu 3'; Carvajal (yellow card) 90+3' (yellow-red card) 90+5'	Stadium: Vallecas; Attendance: 14,354; Referee: Alejandro Muñiz Ruiz

25 February 2024 26	Real Madrid	1–0	Sevilla	Madrid
21:00 UTC+1	Modrić 81'	Report		Stadium: Santiago Bernabéu; Attendance: 74,969; Referee: Isidro Díaz de Mera Escuderos

2 March 2024 27	Valencia	2–2	Real Madrid	Valencia
21:00 UTC+1	Duro 27'; Yaremchuk 30'	Report	Vinícius 45+5', 76'; Bellingham (red card) 90+9'	Stadium: Mestalla; Attendance: 47,427; Referee: Jesús Gil Manzano

10 March 2024 28	Real Madrid	4–0	Celta Vigo	Madrid
18:30 UTC+1	Vinícius 21'; Guaita 79' (o.g.); Domínguez 88' (o.g.); Güler 90+4'	Report		Stadium: Santiago Bernabéu; Attendance: 73,644; Referee: Mario Melero López

16 March 2024 29	Osasuna	2–4	Real Madrid	Pamplona
16:15 UTC+1	Budimir 7'; Muñoz 90+1'	Report	Vinícius 4', 64'; Carvajal 18'; Brahim 61'	Stadium: El Sadar; Attendance: 22,430; Referee: Juan Martínez Munuera

31 March 2024 30	Real Madrid	2–0	Athletic Bilbao	Madrid
21:00 UTC+2	Rodrygo 8', 73'	Report		Stadium: Santiago Bernabéu; Attendance: 72,991; Referee: Javier Alberola Rojas

13 April 2024 31	Mallorca	0–1	Real Madrid	Palma
18:30 UTC+2		Report	Tchouaméni 48'	Stadium: Mallorca Son Moix; Attendance: 23,244; Referee: José María Sánchez Martínez

21 April 2024 32	Real Madrid	3–2	Barcelona	Madrid
21:00 UTC+2	Vinícius 18' (pen.); Vázquez 73'; Bellingham 90+1'	Report	Christensen 6'; Fermín 69'	Stadium: Santiago Bernabéu; Attendance: 77,981; Referee: César Soto Grado

26 April 2024 33	Real Sociedad	0–1	Real Madrid	San Sebastián
21:00 UTC+2		Report	Güler 29'	Stadium: Reale Arena; Attendance: 37,109; Referee: José Luis Munuera Montero

4 May 2024 34	Real Madrid	3–0	Cádiz	Madrid
16:15 UTC+2	Brahim 51'; Bellingham 68'; Joselu 90+3'	Report		Stadium: Santiago Bernabéu; Attendance: 72,654; Referee: Javier Iglesias Villanueva

11 May 2024 35	Granada	0–4	Real Madrid	Granada
18:30 UTC+2		Report	García 38'; Güler 45+2'; Brahim 49', 58'	Stadium: Nuevo Los Cármenes; Attendance: 20,058; Referee: Pablo González Fuertes

14 May 2024 36	Real Madrid	5–0	Alavés	Madrid
21:30 UTC+2	Bellingham 10'; Vinícius 27', 70'; Valverde 45+1'; Güler 81'	Report		Stadium: Santiago Bernabéu; Attendance: 68,954; Referee: Mateo Busquets Ferrer

19 May 2024 37	Villarreal	4–4	Real Madrid	Villarreal
19:00 UTC+2	Sørloth 39', 48', 52', 56'	Report	Güler 14', 45+2'; Joselu 30'; Vázquez 40'	Stadium: Estadio de la Cerámica; Attendance: 21,671; Referee: Alejandro Hernández Hernández

25 May 2024 38	Real Madrid	0–0	Real Betis	Madrid
21:00 UTC+2		Report		Stadium: Santiago Bernabéu; Attendance: 73,614; Referee: Isidro Díaz de Mera Escuderos

=== Copa del Rey ===
Madrid entered the tournament in the round of 32, as they had qualified for the 2024 Supercopa de España.

6 January 2024 Round of 32	Arandina	1–3	Real Madrid	Aranda de Duero
21:30 UTC+1	Nacho 90+3' (o.g.)	Report	Joselu 54' (pen.); Brahim 55'; Rodrygo 90+1'	Stadium: El Montecillo; Attendance: 9,500; Referee: Víctor García Verdura

18 January 2024 Round of 16	Atlético Madrid	4–2 (a.e.t.)	Real Madrid	Madrid
21:30 UTC+1	Lino 39'; Morata 57'; Griezmann 100'; Riquelme 119'	Report	Oblak 45+1' (o.g.); Joselu 82'	Stadium: Cívitas Metropolitano; Attendance: 67,623; Referee: Guillermo Cuadra Fernández

=== Supercopa de España ===
Madrid qualified for the tournament by winning the 2022–23 Copa del Rey.

10 January 2024 Semi-finals	Real Madrid	5–3 (a.e.t.)	Atlético Madrid	Riyadh, Saudi Arabia
22:00 UTC+3	Rüdiger 20'; Mendy 29'; Carvajal 85'; Joselu 116'; Brahim 120+2'	Report	Hermoso 6'; Griezmann 37'; Rüdiger 78' (o.g.)	Stadium: KSU Stadium; Attendance: 23,982; Referee: Javier Alberola Rojas

14 January 2024 Final	Real Madrid	4–1	Barcelona	Riyadh, Saudi Arabia
22:00 UTC+3	Vinícius 7', 10', 39' (pen.); Rodrygo 64'	Report	Lewandowski 33'; Araújo (yellow card) 37' (yellow-red card) 71'	Stadium: KSU Stadium; Attendance: 23,977; Referee: Juan Martínez Munuera

=== UEFA Champions League ===
==== Group stage ====
The group stage draw was held on 31 August 2023.

Pos	Team	Pld	W	D	L	GF	GA	GD	Pts	Qualification	RMA	NAP	BRA	UNB
1	(Spain) Real Madrid	6	6	0	0	16	7	+9	18	Advance to knockout phase	—	4–2	3–0	1–0
2	(Italy) Napoli	6	3	1	2	10	9	+1	10	Advance to knockout phase	2–3	—	2–0	1–1
3	(Portugal) Braga	6	1	1	4	6	12	−6	4	Transfer to Europa League	1–2	1–2	—	1–1
4	(Germany) Union Berlin	6	0	2	4	6	10	−4	2		2–3	0–1	2–3	—

Source: UEFA
Rules for classification: Group stage tiebreakers

20 September 2023 1	Real Madrid (Spain)	1–0	(Germany) Union Berlin	Madrid, Spain
18:45 UTC+2	Bellingham 90+4'	Report		Stadium: Santiago Bernabéu; Attendance: 65,207; Referee: Espen Eskås (Norway)

3 October 2023 2	Napoli (Italy)	2–3	(Spain) Real Madrid	Naples, Italy
21:00 UTC+2	Østigård 19'; Zieliński 54' (pen.)	Report	Vinícius 27'; Bellingham 34'; Meret 78' (o.g.)	Stadium: Stadio Diego Armando Maradona; Attendance: 51,649; Referee: Clément Turpin (France)

24 October 2023 3	Braga (Portugal)	1–2	(Spain) Real Madrid	Braga, Portugal
21:00 UTC+2	Djaló 63'	Report	Rodrygo 16'; Bellingham 61'	Stadium: Estádio Municipal; Attendance: 29,820; Referee: Michael Oliver (England)

8 November 2023 4	Real Madrid (Spain)	3–0	(Portugal) Braga	Madrid, Spain
21:00 UTC+1	Brahim 27'; Vinícius 58'; Rodrygo 61'	Report		Stadium: Santiago Bernabéu; Attendance: 68,509; Referee: Halil Umut Meler (Turkey)

29 November 2023 5	Real Madrid (Spain)	4–2	(Italy) Napoli	Madrid, Spain
21:00 UTC+1	Rodrygo 11'; Bellingham 22'; Paz 84'; Joselu 90+4'	Report	Simeone 9'; Zambo Anguissa 47'	Stadium: Santiago Bernabéu; Attendance: 73,562; Referee: François Letexier (France)

12 December 2023 6	Union Berlin (Germany)	2–3	(Spain) Real Madrid	Berlin, Germany
21:00 UTC+1	Volland 45+1'; Král 85'	Report	Joselu 61', 72'; Ceballos 89'	Stadium: Olympiastadion (Note: Union Berlin played their home matches at the Olympiastadion, in Berlin, instead of their regular stadium, Stadion An der Alten Försterei, in Berlin.); Attendance: 73,420; Referee: Rade Obrenovič (Slovenia)

==== Knockout phase ====
===== Round of 16 =====
The draw for the round of 16 was held on 18 December 2023.

13 February 2024 First leg	RB Leipzig (Germany)	0–1	(Spain) Real Madrid	Leipzig, Germany
21:00 UTC+1		Report	Brahim 48'	Stadium: Red Bull Arena; Attendance: 45,028; Referee: Irfan Peljto (Bosnia and Herzegovina)

6 March 2024 Second leg	Real Madrid (Spain)	1–1 (2–1 agg.)	(Germany) RB Leipzig	Madrid, Spain
21:00 UTC+1	Vinícius 65'	Report	Orbán 68'	Stadium: Santiago Bernabéu; Attendance: 76,126; Referee: Davide Massa (Italy)

===== Quarter-finals =====
The draw for the quarter-finals and semi-finals was held on 15 March 2024.

9 April 2024 First leg	Real Madrid (Spain)	3–3	(England) Manchester City	Madrid, Spain
21:00 UTC+2	Dias 12' (o.g.); Rodrygo 14'; Valverde 79'	Report	Silva 2'; Foden 66'; Gvardiol 71'	Stadium: Santiago Bernabéu; Attendance: 76,680; Referee: François Letexier (France)

17 April 2024 Second leg	Manchester City (England)	1–1 (a.e.t.) (4–4 agg.) (3–4 p)	(Spain) Real Madrid	Manchester, England
20:00 UTC+1	De Bruyne 76'	Report	Rodrygo 12'	Stadium: City of Manchester Stadium; Attendance: 52,306; Referee: Daniele Orsato (Italy)
	Penalties
	Álvarez (penalty scored); Silva (penalty missed); Kovačić (penalty missed); Foden (penalty scored); Ederson (penalty scored)		(penalty missed) Modrić; (penalty scored) Bellingham; (penalty scored) Vázquez; (penalty scored) Nacho; (penalty scored) Rüdiger

===== Semi-finals =====
30 April 2024 First leg	Bayern Munich (Germany)	2–2	(Spain) Real Madrid	Munich, Germany
21:00 UTC+2	Sané 53'; Kane 57' (pen.)	Report	Vinícius 24', 83' (pen.)	Stadium: Allianz Arena; Attendance: 75,000; Referee: Clément Turpin (France)

8 May 2024 Second leg	Real Madrid (Spain)	2–1 (4–3 agg.)	(Germany) Bayern Munich	Madrid, Spain
21:00 UTC+2	Joselu 88', 90+1'	Report	Davies 68'	Stadium: Santiago Bernabéu; Attendance: 76,579; Referee: Szymon Marciniak (Poland)

===== Final =====
1 June 2024 Final	Borussia Dortmund (Germany)	0–2	(Spain) Real Madrid	London, England
20:00 UTC+1		Report	Carvajal 74'; Vinícius 83'	Stadium: Wembley Stadium; Attendance: 86,212; Referee: Slavko Vinčić (Slovenia)

== Statistics ==
=== Squad statistics ===
No.	Pos	Nat	Player	Total		La Liga		Copa del Rey		Champions League		Supercopa de España	
No.	Pos	Nat	Player	Apps	Goals	Apps	Goals	Apps	Goals	Apps	Goals	Apps	Goals
1	GK	(Belgium)	Thibaut Courtois	5	0	4	0	0	0	1	0	0	0
2	DF	(Spain)	Dani Carvajal	41	6	28	4	1	0	10	1	2	1
3	DF	(Brazil)	Éder Militão	13	0	10	0	0	0	3	0	0	0
4	DF	(Austria)	David Alaba	17	0	14	0	0	0	3	0	0	0
5	MF	(England)	Jude Bellingham	42	23	28	19	1	0	11	4	2	0
6	DF	(Spain)	Nacho	45	0	29	0	2	0	12	0	2	0
7	FW	(Brazil)	Vinícius Júnior	39	24	26	15	1	0	10	6	2	3
8	MF	(Germany)	Toni Kroos	48	1	33	1	1	0	12	0	2	0
10	MF	(Croatia)	Luka Modrić	46	2	32	2	1	0	11	0	2	0
11	FW	(Brazil)	Rodrygo	51	17	34	10	2	1	13	5	2	1
12	MF	(France)	Eduardo Camavinga	46	0	31	0	2	0	11	0	2	0
13	GK	(Ukraine)	Andriy Lunin	31	0	21	0	1	0	8	0	1	0
14	FW	(Spain)	Joselu	49	18	34	10	2	2	11	5	2	1
15	MF	(Uruguay)	Federico Valverde	54	3	37	2	2	0	13	1	2	0
16	DF	(Spain)	Álvaro Odriozola †	0	0	0	0	0	0	0	0	0	0
17	FW	(Spain)	Lucas Vázquez	38	3	29	3	0	0	9	0	0	0
18	MF	(France)	Aurélien Tchouaméni	38	3	27	3	1	0	8	0	2	0
19	MF	(Spain)	Dani Ceballos	27	1	20	0	2	0	3	1	2	0
20	DF	(Spain)	Fran García	31	1	25	1	2	0	4	0	0	0
21	FW	(Morocco)	Brahim Díaz	44	12	31	8	2	1	9	2	2	1
22	DF	(Germany)	Antonio Rüdiger	48	2	33	1	1	0	12	0	2	1
23	DF	(France)	Ferland Mendy	37	1	23	0	1	0	11	0	2	1
24	MF	(Turkey)	Arda Güler	12	6	10	6	1	0	0	0	1	0
25	GK	(Spain)	Kepa Arrizabalaga	20	0	14	0	1	0	4	0	1	0
28	MF	(Spain)	Mario Martín	3	0	2	0	1	0	0	0	0	0
29	FW	(Uruguay)	Álvaro Rodríguez	2	0	1	0	1	0	0	0	0	0
32	MF	(Argentina)	Nico Paz	8	1	4	0	1	0	3	1	0	0
33	FW	(Spain)	Gonzalo García	2	0	2	0	0	0	0	0	0	0
34	DF	(Spain)	Álvaro Carrillo	1	0	0	0	1	0	0	0	0	0
36	DF	(Brazil)	Vinicius Tobias	1	0	0	0	1	0	0	0	0	0

Source: FBREF

^{†} Player left Madrid during the season.

=== Goals ===
Rank	Player	La Liga	CdR	UCL	Supercopa	Total
1	(Brazil) Vinícius Júnior	15	0	6	3	24
2	(England) Jude Bellingham	19	0	4	0	23
3	(Spain) Joselu	10	2	5	1	18
4	(Brazil) Rodrygo	10	1	5	1	17
5	(Morocco) Brahim Díaz	8	1	2	1	12
6	(Spain) Dani Carvajal	4	0	1	1	6
6	(Turkey) Arda Güler	6	0	0	0	6
8	(France) Aurélien Tchouaméni	3	0	0	0	3
8	(Uruguay) Federico Valverde	2	0	1	0	3
8	(Spain) Lucas Vázquez	3	0	0	0	3
11	(Croatia) Luka Modrić	2	0	0	0	2
11	(Germany) Antonio Rüdiger	1	0	0	1	2
13	(Spain) Dani Ceballos	0	0	1	0	1
13	(Spain) Fran García	1	0	0	0	1
13	(Germany) Toni Kroos	1	0	0	0	1
13	(France) Ferland Mendy	0	0	0	1	1
13	(Argentina) Nico Paz	0	0	1	0	1
Own goals		2	1	2	0	5
Total		87	5	28	9	129

Source: FBREF

=== Clean sheets ===
Rank	Player	La Liga	CdR	UCL	Supercopa	Total
1	(Ukraine) Andriy Lunin	10	0	2	0	12
2	(Spain) Kepa Arrizabalaga	7	0	1	0	8
3	(Belgium) Thibaut Courtois	4	0	1	0	5
Total		21	0	4	0	25

Source: FBREF

=== Disciplinary record ===
N	P	Nat.	Name	La Liga			CdR			UCL			Supercopa			Total			Notes
N	P	Nat.	Name	Yellow card	Second yellow card	Red card	Yellow card	Second yellow card	Red card	Yellow card	Second yellow card	Red card	Yellow card	Second yellow card	Red card	Yellow card	Second yellow card	Red card	Notes
6	DF	(Spain)	Nacho	4		2				1						5		2	
5	MF	(England)	Jude Bellingham	5		1	1			2			1			9		1	
2	DF	(Spain)	Dani Carvajal	3	1		1			3						7	1		
12	MF	(France)	Eduardo Camavinga	9			1			3						13			
7	FW	(Brazil)	Vinícius Júnior	7			1			3						11			
18	MF	(France)	Aurélien Tchouaméni	7			1			3						11			
22	DF	(Germany)	Antonio Rüdiger	7									1			8			
23	DF	(France)	Ferland Mendy	5						1						6			
8	MF	(Germany)	Toni Kroos	3						2						5			
4	DF	(Austria)	David Alaba	2						1						3			
17	MF	(Spain)	Lucas Vázquez							2						2			
10	MF	(Croatia)	Luka Modrić	2												2			
11	FW	(Brazil)	Rodrygo	2												2			
13	GK	(Ukraine)	Andriy Lunin	2												2			
15	MF	(Uruguay)	Federico Valverde	2												2			
19	MF	(Spain)	Dani Ceballos	1						1						2			
20	DF	(Spain)	Fran García	2												2			
21	FW	(Morocco)	Brahim Díaz				1						1			2			
25	GK	(Spain)	Kepa Arrizabalaga	1						1						2			
14	FW	(Spain)	Joselu	1												1			
24	MF	(Turkey)	Arda Güler	1												1			

Source: FBREF
Ordered by (red card) , (second yellow card) and (yellow card)
(yellow card) = Number of bookings; (second yellow card) = Number of sending offs after a second yellow card; (red card) = Number of sending offs by a direct red card.

== Awards ==
=== Monthly awards ===
==== La Liga awards ====
Award	Month	Player(s) / Coach	Ref.
Player of the Month	August	(England) Jude Bellingham	
Coach of the Month	August	(Italy) Carlo Ancelotti	
Play of the Month	September	(Spain) Fran García (Uruguay) Federico Valverde	
Player of the Month	October	(England) Jude Bellingham	
U23 Player of the Month	November	(Brazil) Rodrygo	
Goal of the Month	February	(Brazil) Vinícius Júnior	
Coach of the Month	April	(Italy) Carlo Ancelotti	
Player of the Month	March	(Brazil) Vinícius Júnior	

==== Mahou awards ====
Award	Month	Player	Ref.
Player of the Month	August	(England) Jude Bellingham	
Player of the Month	September	(England) Jude Bellingham	
Player of the Month	October	(England) Jude Bellingham	
Player of the Month	November	(Brazil) Rodrygo	
Player of the Month	December	(Morocco) Brahim Díaz	
Player of the Month	January	(Brazil) Vinícius Júnior	
Player of the Month	February	(Morocco) Brahim Díaz	
Player of the Month	March	(Brazil) Vinícius Júnior	
Player of the Month	April	(Germany) Antonio Rüdiger	

=== Annual Awards ===
Award	Player(s)	Ref.
La Liga Player of the Year	(England) Jude Bellingham	
La Liga Team of the Season	(England) Jude Bellingham (Spain) Dani Carvajal (Germany) Antonio Rüdiger (Uruguay) Federico Valverde (Brazil) Vinícius Júnior	
UEFA Champions League Player of the Season	(Brazil) Vinícius Júnior	
UEFA Champions League Young Player of the Season	(England) Jude Bellingham	
UEFA Champions League Team of the Season	(England) Jude Bellingham (Spain) Dani Carvajal (Germany) Antonio Rüdiger (Brazil) Vinícius Júnior	
UEFA Champions League Goal of the Season	(Uruguay) Federico Valverde	
FIFPRO Men's World 11	(England) Jude Bellingham (Belgium) Thibaut Courtois (Brazil) Vinícius Júnior	
Mahou Player of the Season	(England) Jude Bellingham	
