= Raúl García (footballer, born 2000) =

Spanish footballer (born 2000)

Personal information
- Full name: Raúl García de Haro
- Date of birth: 3 November 2000 (age 26)
- Place of birth: Olesa de Montserrat, Spain
- Height: 1.92 m (6 ft 4 in)
- Position: Striker

Team information
- Current team: Osasuna
- Number: 9

Youth career
- 2009–2013: Guadix
- 2013–2018: Almería
- 2018: Betis

Senior career*
Years	Team	Apps	(Gls)
2017	Almería B	1	(0)
2018–2022	Betis B	102	(50)
2019–2023	Betis	4	(0)
2022–2023	→ Mirandés (loan)	39	(19)
2023–	Osasuna	103	(17)
- * Club domestic league appearances and goals as of 27 May 2026

Raúl García de Haro (born 3 November 2000) is a Spanish professional footballer who plays as a striker for La Liga club Osasuna.

== Career ==
=== Early career ===
Born in Olesa de Montserrat, Barcelona, Catalonia, García was raised in Guadix, Granada, Andalusia, and joined Guadix CF's youth setup in 2009. In 2013 he moved to UD Almería, and made his senior debut with the reserves on 29 October 2017 by coming on as a late substitute in a 1–0 Tercera División away loss against Atarfe Industrial CF.

=== Betis ===
On 12 July 2018, García joined Real Betis; initially assigned to the Juvenil A squad, he appeared regularly with the B-team also in the fourth division during the campaign, scoring 15 goals. He made his first team – and La Liga – debut on 24 September of the following year, replacing Borja Iglesias late into a 3–1 home success over Levante UD.

On 7 March 2022, García renewed his contract with Betis until 2025.

==== Loan to Mirandés ====
On 28 June 2022, García was loaned to Segunda División side CD Mirandés for the season. He scored his first professional goal on 13 August, in a 2–2 home draw against Sporting de Gijón; it was also his debut for Mirandés.

In December 2022, García scored three times in three matches (including a brace in a 2–1 home win over SD Ponferradina), as the club remained undefeated during the entire month. He ended the campaign with 19 goals, being the division's top national scorer, and second behind Granada CF's Myrto Uzuni.

=== Osasuna ===
On 10 August 2023, García signed a five-year contract with Osasuna in the top tier, for a €6 million fee.

== Career statistics ==
As of match played 12 April 2026

Appearances and goals by club, season and competition
Club	Season	League			Copa del Rey		Europe		Other		Total	
Club	Season	Division	Apps	Goals	Apps	Goals	Apps	Goals	Apps	Goals	Apps	Goals
Mirandés (loan)	2022–23	Segunda División	39	19	–		–		–		39	19
Osasuna	2023–24	La Liga	35	6	2	0	1 (Note: Appearance in UEFA Europa Conference League)	0	–		38	6
Osasuna	2024–25	La Liga	32	4	4	3	–		1 (Note: Appearance in Supercopa de España)	0	37	7
Osasuna	2025–26	La Liga	29	5	4	7	–		–		33	12
Osasuna	Total		96	15	10	10	1	0	1	0	108	25
Career total			135	34	10	10	1	0	1	0	147	44

== Honours ==
Betis

- Copa del Rey: 2021–22

Individual

- Copa del Rey top scorer: 2025–26
