= Jesús Areso =

Spanish footballer

Personal information
- Full name: Jesús Areso Blanco
- Date of birth: 2 July 1999 (age 27)
- Place of birth: Cascante, Spain
- Height: 1.82 m (6 ft 0 in)
- Position: Right-back

Team information
- Current team: Athletic Bilbao
- Number: 12

Youth career
- Aluvión
- 2014–2017: Osasuna

Senior career*
Years	Team	Apps	(Gls)
2017–2021	Bilbao Athletic	77	(0)
2021–2025	Osasuna	76	(1)
2022–2023	→ Burgos (loan)	38	(0)
2025–	Athletic Bilbao	31	(0)

International career
2017	Spain U18	2	(0)
2018	Spain U19	2	(0)
2019–	Basque Country	1	(0)
- * Club domestic league appearances and goals as of 17 October 2026

Jesús Areso Blanco (born 2 July 1999) is a Spanish professional footballer who plays as a right-back for La Liga club Athletic Bilbao.

== Club career ==
=== Athletic Bilbao ===
Born in Cascante, Navarre, Areso joined CA Osasuna's youth setup in 2014, from CD Aluvión. On 7 July 2017, after finishing his formation, he moved to Athletic Bilbao after the club paid his € 450,000 release clause; alleging "abusive behavior", Osasuna chose to break off relations with Athletic after this.

Areso was assigned to Athletic's reserves in Segunda División B, making his senior debut on 2 September 2017 by coming on as a late substitute for Peru Nolaskoain in a 4–0 home routing of Real Unión. Initially a backup to Jon Sillero, he subsequently became a starter from the 2018–19 campaign onwards.

In August 2020, after making the pre-season with the main squad, Areso was demoted to the B team after refusing to agree to a new deal, and spent the entire season without playing a single minute. He allegedly refused a contract renewal after seeing few chances of playing in the first team, and officially left the club on 26 May 2021.

=== Osasuna ===
Immediately after leaving Athletic, Areso returned to Osasuna after signing a five-year contract on 26 May 2021. He made his professional – and La Liga – debut on 26 September, starting in a 3–2 away win over RCD Mallorca.

On 23 August 2022, after featuring rarely, Areso was loaned to Segunda División side Burgos CF for the season. On 21 January 2024, having returned to Osasuna, he scored the winning goal in a 3–2 victory against Getafe CF after a cross from the touchline at a distance of over 30 meters (98 ft) curled the other way, finding its way into the net.

=== Athletic Bilbao return ===
On 22 July 2025, Areso returned to Athletic on a six-year contract, after the club activated his € 12 million release clause.

== International career ==
Areso made his debut for the unofficial Basque Country national team in May 2019, in a 0–0 draw away to Panama for which a small, youthful and inexperienced squad was selected.

== Personal life ==
Areso's older brother Javier is also a footballer. A winger, he began his career with Osasuna neighbors AD San Juan.

== Career statistics ==
As of match played 17 October 2026

Appearances and goals by club, season and competition
Club	Season	League			Cup		Europe		Other		Total	
Club	Season	Division	Apps	Goals	Apps	Goals	Apps	Goals	Apps	Goals	Apps	Goals
Bilbao Athletic	2017–18	Segunda División B	26	0	—		—		1 (Note: Segunda División B play-offs)	0	27	0
Bilbao Athletic	2018–19	Segunda División B	25	0	—		—		—		25	0
Bilbao Athletic	2019–20	Segunda División B	26	0	—		—		1	0	27	0
Bilbao Athletic	Total		77	0	—		—		2	0	79	0
Osasuna	2021–22	La Liga	3	0	1	0	—		—		4	0
Osasuna	2023–24	La Liga	37	1	2	0	2 (Note: Appearances in UEFA Conference League)	0	1 (Note: Appearance in Supercopa de España)	0	42	1
Osasuna	2024–25	La Liga	36	0	4	0	—		—		40	0
Osasuna	Total		76	1	7	0	2	0	1	0	86	1
Burgos (loan)	2022–23	Segunda División	38	0	2	0	—		—		40	0
Athletic Bilbao	2025–26	La Liga	25	0	3	0	4 (Note: Appearances in UEFA Champions League)	0	1	0	33	0
Athletic Bilbao	2026–27	La Liga	6	0	0	0	—		—		6	0
Athletic Bilbao	Total		31	0	3	0	4	0	1	0	39	0
Career total			222	1	12	0	6	0	4	0	244	1

== Honours ==
Individual

- La Liga Goal of the Season: 2023–24
- La Liga Goal of the Month: January 2024
