= 2024 Supercopa de España =

Spanish football competition played in Saudi Arabia

Tournament details
- Host country: Saudi Arabia
- Dates: 10–14 January 2024
- Teams: 4
- Venue: 1 (in 1 host city)

Final positions
- Champions: Real Madrid (13th title)
- Runners-up: Barcelona

Tournament statistics
- Matches played: 3
- Goals scored: 15 (5 per match)
- Attendance: 71,891 (23,964 per match)
- Top scorer(s): Vinícius Júnior (3 goals)

The 2024 Supercopa de España was the 40th edition of the Supercopa de España, an annual football competition for clubs in the Spanish football league system that were successful in its major competitions in the preceding season.

Real Madrid won the tournament for their thirteenth Supercopa de España title.

== Qualification ==
The tournament was to feature the winners and runners-up of the 2022–23 Copa del Rey and 2022–23 La Liga. As one of top two league finishers also reached the cup final, the remaining spot was filled by the league's third place club.

=== Qualified teams ===
The following four teams qualified for the tournament.

| Team | Method of qualification | Appearance | Last appearance as | Previous performance | | |
| Team | Method of qualification | Appearance | Last appearance as | Winner(s) | Runners-up | Semi-finalists |
|---|---|---|---|---|---|---|
| Real Madrid | 2022–23 Copa del Rey winners and 2022–23 La Liga runners-up | 20th | 2023 runners-up | 12 | 6 | 1 |
| Barcelona | 2022–23 La Liga winners | 28th | 2023 winners | 14 | 11 | 2 |
| Osasuna | 2022–23 Copa del Rey runners-up | 1st | – | – | – | – |
| Atlético Madrid | 2022–23 La Liga third place | 9th | 2022 semi-finalists | 2 | 5 | 1 |

== Venue ==
All three matches were held at the King Saud University Stadium in Riyadh, Saudi Arabia.

| Location of the host city of the 2024 Supercopa de España. | City | Stadium |
|---|---|---|
| Location of the host city of the 2024 Supercopa de España. | Riyadh | King Saud University Stadium |
| Location of the host city of the 2024 Supercopa de España. | Capacity: 25,000 | |

== Matches ==
- Times listed are SAST (UTC+3).

=== Bracket ===
Semi-finals
10 January 2024 – Riyadh
Real Madrid (a.e.t.) | 5
Atlético Madrid | 3
11 January 2024 – Riyadh
Barcelona | 2
Osasuna | 0

Final
14 January 2024 – Riyadh
Real Madrid | 4
Barcelona | 1

=== Semi-finals ===
10 January 2024
22:00

| Real Madrid | 5–3 (a.e.t.) | Atlético Madrid |
|---|---|---|
| Rüdiger 20'; Mendy 29'; Carvajal 85'; Joselu 115'; Brahim 120+2' | Report | Hermoso 6'; Griezmann 37'; Rüdiger 78' (o.g.) |

King Saud University Stadium, Riyadh
Attendance: 23,982
Referee: Javier Alberola Rojas (Castilla–La Mancha)

11 January 2024
22:00

| Barcelona | 2–0 | Osasuna |
|---|---|---|
| Lewandowski 59'; Yamal 90+3' | Report |

King Saud University Stadium, Riyadh
Attendance: 23,932
Referee: Alejandro Muñiz Ruiz (Galicia)

=== Final ===
14 January 2024
22:00

| Real Madrid | 4–1 | Barcelona |
|---|---|---|
| Vinícius 7', 10', 39' (pen.); Rodrygo 64' | Report | Lewandowski 33' |

King Saud University Stadium, Riyadh
Attendance: 23,977
Referee: Juan Martínez Munuera (Valencian Community)

== See also ==
- 2023–24 La Liga
- 2023–24 Copa del Rey
