= Pablo Ibáñez (footballer, born 1998) =

Spanish footballer

Personal information
- Full name: Pablo Ibáñez Lumbreras
- Date of birth: 20 September 1998 (age 28)
- Place of birth: Pamplona, Spain
- Height: 1.79 m (5 ft 10 in)
- Position: Defensive midfielder

Team information
- Current team: Alavés
- Number: 19

Youth career
- 2005–2014: Osasuna
- 2014–2016: Mutilvera
- 2016–2017: San Juan

Senior career*
Years	Team	Apps	(Gls)
2017–2019	San Juan	64	(5)
2019–2021	Mutilvera	25	(1)
2021–2022	Osasuna B	49	(10)
2022–2025	Osasuna	86	(2)
2025–	Alavés	37	(1)

International career
2025–	Basque Country	1	(0)
- * Club domestic league appearances and goals as of 27 May 2026

Pablo Ibáñez Lumbreras (born 20 September 1998) is a Spanish professional footballer who plays as a defensive midfielder for Deportivo Alavés.

== Career ==
=== Early career ===
Born in Pamplona, Ibáñez joined CA Osasuna's youth setup in 2005, aged seven. After leaving the club in 2014, he represented UD Mutilvera and AD San Juan, and finished his formation with the latter in 2017.

Ibáñez made his senior debut with San Juan on 19 August 2017, starting in a 3–0 Tercera División away win over CD Valle de Egüés. He scored his first senior goal on 16 December, in a 2–2 home draw against CD Baztán.

A regular starter, Ibáñez moved to fellow fourth tier side Mutilvera in August 2019, and helped in the club's promotion to Segunda División B during his first season.

=== Osasuna ===
On 1 February 2021, Ibáñez returned to his first club Osasuna on an 18-month contract, being initially assigned to the reserves also in the third division. On 9 March 2022, he renewed his contract with the Rojillos until 2024, being definitely promoted to the main squad ahead of the 2022–23 campaign.

Ibáñez made his professional – and La Liga – debut on 12 August 2022, in a 2–1 home win over Sevilla FC. On 4 April of the following year, he scored his first goal for Osasuna in the closing minutes of extra time to secure a victory for his team over rivals Athletic Bilbao in the semi-final of the 2022–23 Copa del Rey (1–1 draw on the night, 2–1 on aggregate), sending Osasuna to the final for only the second time in club history, as well as qualifying for the following season's Supercopa de España (a first ever appearance in that competition).

=== Alavés ===
On 23 June 2025, Ibáñez signed a five-year deal with fellow top tier side Deportivo Alavés, as his contract with Osasuna was due to expire.

== International career ==
Ibáñez was called up to the Basque Country national team for a friendly match against Palestine on 15 November 2025.

== Personal life ==
His cousin Hugo Rincón is also a footballer.

== Career statistics ==
As of match played on 7 January 2024

Appearances and goals by club, season and competition
Club	Season	League			National cup		Continental		Other		Total	
Club	Season	Division	Apps	Goals	Apps	Goals	Apps	Goals	Apps	Goals	Apps	Goals
Mutilvera	2020–21	Segunda División B	11	0	2	0	—		—		13	0
Osasuna B	2020–21	Segunda División B	15	1	—		—		—		15	1
Osasuna B	2021–22	Segunda División RFEF	34	9	—		—		—		34	9
Osasuna B	Total		49	10	0	0	0	0	0	0	49	10
Osasuna	2022–23	La Liga	25	0	6	1	—		—		31	1
Osasuna	2023–24	La Liga	15	1	1	0	1 (Note: Appearance in the UEFA Europa Conference League)	0	—		17	1
Osasuna	Total		40	1	7	1	1	0	0	0	48	2
Career totals			100	11	9	1	1	0	0	0	110	12

== Honours ==
Osasuna

- Copa del Rey: runner-up 2022–23
