= Diego Moreno (footballer, born 2001) =

Spanish footballer

Personal information
- Full name: Diego Moreno Garbayo
- Date of birth: 21 June 2001 (age 25)
- Place of birth: Cintruénigo, Spain
- Height: 1.77 m (5 ft 10 in)
- Position: Right back

Team information
- Current team: Zamora
- Number: 14

Youth career
- Cirbonero
- 2011–2020: Osasuna

Senior career*
Years	Team	Apps	(Gls)
2020–2025	Osasuna B	104	(3)
2023–2025	Osasuna	11	(0)
2023–2024	→ Mirandés (loan)	10	(0)
2024	→ Cartagena (loan)	15	(0)
2025–2026	Ponferradina	15	(0)
2026–	Zamora	8	(0)
- * Club domestic league appearances and goals as of 25 May 2026

Diego Moreno Garbayo (born 21 June 2001) is a Spanish footballer who plays as a right back for Primera Federación club Zamora.

== Club career ==
Born in Cintruénigo, Navarre, Moreno joined CA Osasuna's youth setup in 2011, from hometown side CA Cirbonero. He made his senior debut with the reserves on 19 January 2020, starting in a 2–0 Segunda División B away loss against Real Valladolid Promesas.

On 24 March 2021, after already establishing himself as a starter for the B-team, Moreno renewed his contract until 2023. On 30 December of the following year, he further extended his link until 2024.

Moreno made his first team debut on 5 January 2023, coming on as a second-half substitute for injured Rubén Peña in a 2–1 away win over Gimnàstic de Tarragona, for the season's Copa del Rey. His La Liga – and professional – debut occurred four days later, as he played the full 90 minutes in a 0–0 draw at Athletic Bilbao.

On 1 July 2023, Moreno renewed his contract with the Rojillos until 2026, being immediately loaned to Segunda División side CD Mirandés for the season. The following 26 January, he moved to fellow league team FC Cartagena also in a temporary deal.

Moreno spent the 2024–25 campaign with Osasuna's reserves in Primera Federación, before terminating his contract with the club on 18 July 2025.

== Honours ==
Osasuna

- Copa del Rey: runner-up 2022–23
