= Iker Muñoz =

Spanish footballer

Personal information
- Full name: Iker Muñoz Cameros
- Date of birth: 5 November 2002 (age 24)
- Place of birth: Villafranca, Spain
- Height: 1.79 m (5 ft 10 in)
- Position: Defensive midfielder

Team information
- Current team: Osasuna
- Number: 8

Youth career
- Falcesino
- Oberena
- 2018–2021: Osasuna

Senior career*
| Years | Team | Apps | (Gls) |
| 2019–2023 | Osasuna B | 62 | (3) |
| 2023– | Osasuna | 78 | (4) |

International career^{‡}
| 2023– | Spain U21 | 2 | (0) |
- * Club domestic league appearances and goals as of 27 May 2026 ‡ National team caps and goals as of 17 October 2023

Iker Muñoz Cameros (born 5 November 2002) is a Spanish professional footballer who plays as a defensive midfielder for La Liga club Osasuna.

== Club career ==
Born in Villafranca, Navarre, Muñoz joined CA Osasuna's youth setup in 2018, from CD Oberena. On 9 April of the following year, he renewed his contract until 2021.

Muñoz made his senior debut with the reserves on 30 November 2019, coming on as a late substitute for goalscorer Aimar Oroz in a 3–1 Segunda División B home win over Deportivo Alavés B. Definitely promoted to the B-side ahead of the 2021–22 season, he scored his first goal on 16 October 2021, netting the B's second in a 2–2 home draw against Racing Rioja CF.

On 30 December 2022, Muñoz further extended his link until 2025. He made his first team – and La Liga – debut the following 12 February, replacing Lucas Torró in a 0–0 away draw against Real Valladolid.

Muñoz scored his first professional goal on 17 September 2023, netting the equalizer in a 3–2 away loss to Getafe CF.

== Honours ==
Osasuna

- Copa del Rey: runner-up 2022–23
