= Aimar Oroz =

Spanish footballer (born 2001)

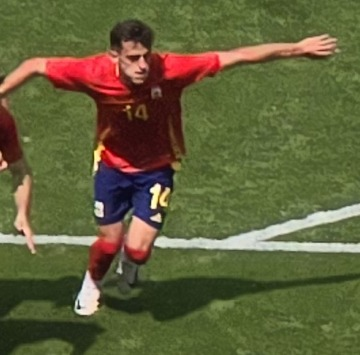
- Oroz playing for Spain U23 in the 2024 Summer Olympics

Personal information
- Full name: Aimar Oroz Huarte
- Date of birth: 27 November 2001 (age 24)
- Place of birth: Arazuri, Spain
- Height: 1.77 m (5 ft 10 in)
- Position: Attacking midfielder

Team information
- Current team: Osasuna
- Number: 10

Youth career
- San Juan
- Ikastola Sanduzelai
- 2014–2018: Osasuna

Senior career*
| Years | Team | Apps | (Gls) |
| 2018–2022 | Osasuna B | 96 | (14) |
| 2019– | Osasuna | 134 | (10) |

International career^{‡}
| 2022–2023 | Spain U21 | 10 | (2) |
| 2024 | Spain U23 | 9 | (10) |
Medal record
Men's football
Representing Spain
Olympic Games
| Gold medal – first place | 2024 Paris |
UEFA European Under-21 Championship
| Runner-up | 2023 Georgia–Romania |
- * Club domestic league appearances and goals as of 27 May 2026 ‡ National team caps and goals as of 9 August 2024

Aimar Oroz Huarte (born 27 November 2001) is a Spanish professional footballer who plays as an attacking midfielder for La Liga club Osasuna.

== Club career ==
Born in Arazuri, Navarre, Oroz joined CA Osasuna's youth setup in 2014, from Ikastola Sanduzelai. On 30 May 2018, after finishing his formation, he signed a two-year contract with the club, with an option for a further two.

Aged 16, Oroz made his senior debut with the reserves on 1 September 2018, starting in a 2–0 Tercera División home win against CD Subiza. He made his professional debut the following 31 May, coming on as a late substitute for Rubén García in a 3–2 away success over Córdoba CF in the Segunda División championship.

On 14 May 2020, after already becoming a regular starter for the B's, Oroz renewed his contract with the Rojillos until 2023. He made his La Liga debut on 19 July, replacing Adrián López in a 2–2 home draw against RCD Mallorca.

On 20 June 2022, after scoring 11 goals for the B's and helping in their promotion to Primera División RFEF, Oroz renewed his contract until 2026. On 31 August, after being a starter in the club's first three matches of the campaign, he was definitely promoted to the main squad.

== International career ==
On September 16, 2022, Oroz was called up for the first time to the U-21 team for two friendly matches. On July 10, 2024, he was included in the final squad to compete in the Paris 2024 Olympic Games, where he won the gold medal on August 9, 2024, against the host nation with a 3-5 scoreline.

== Career statistics ==
=== Club ===
As of match played 31 May 2026

Appearances and goals by club, season and competition
| Club | Season | League | | | National cup | | Europe | | Other | | Total | |
| Club | Season | Division | Apps | Goals | Apps | Goals | Apps | Goals | Apps | Goals | Apps | Goals |
|---|---|---|---|---|---|---|---|---|---|---|---|---|
| Osasuna B | 2018–19 | Tercera División | 19 | 0 | — | | — | | — | | 19 | 0 |
| Osasuna B | 2019–20 | Segunda División B | 21 | 1 | — | | — | | — | | 21 | 1 |
| Osasuna B | 2020–21 | Segunda División B | 24 | 2 | — | | — | | — | | 24 | 2 |
| Osasuna B | 2021–22 | Segunda División RFEF | 32 | 11 | — | | — | | — | | 32 | 11 |
| Osasuna B | Total | | 96 | 14 | — | | — | | — | | 96 | 14 |
| Osasuna | 2018–19 | Segunda División | 1 | 0 | 0 | 0 | — | | — | | 1 | 0 |
| Osasuna | 2019–20 | La Liga | 1 | 0 | 0 | 0 | — | | — | | 1 | 0 |
| Osasuna | 2020–21 | La Liga | 0 | 0 | 2 | 0 | — | | — | | 2 | 0 |
| Osasuna | 2022–23 | La Liga | 31 | 3 | 7 | 0 | — | | — | | 38 | 3 |
| Osasuna | 2023–24 | La Liga | 33 | 2 | 2 | 0 | 2 (Note: Appearances in UEFA Europa Conference League) | 0 | 1 (Note: Appearance in Supercopa de España) | 0 | 38 | 2 |
| Osasuna | 2024–25 | La Liga | 37 | 5 | 4 | 1 | — | | — | | 41 | 6 |
| Osasuna | 2025–26 | La Liga | 31 | 0 | 0 | 0 | — | | — | | 31 | 0 |
| Osasuna | Total | | 134 | 10 | 15 | 1 | 2 | 0 | 1 | 0 | 152 | 11 |
| Career total | | | 230 | 24 | 15 | 1 | 2 | 0 | 1 | 0 | 248 | 25 |

== Honours ==
Osasuna

- Segunda División: 2018–19
- Copa del Rey: runner-up 2022–23

Spain U21

- UEFA European Under-21 Championship runner-up: 2023

Spain U23

- Summer Olympics gold medal: 2024
