= Lucas Torró =

Spanish footballer

Personal information
- Full name: Lucas Torró Marset
- Date of birth: 19 July 1994 (age 32)
- Place of birth: Cocentaina, Spain
- Height: 1.88 m (6 ft 2 in)
- Position: Central midfielder

Team information
- Current team: Osasuna
- Number: 6

Youth career
- 2002–2003: CD Contestano
- 2003–2005: Ontinyent
- 2005–2007: Hércules
- 2007–2008: Alcoyano
- 2008–2009: Hércules
- 2010–2012: Alcoyano
- 2012–2013: Real Madrid

Senior career*
Years	Team	Apps	(Gls)
2011–2012	Alcoyano	2	(0)
2012–2017	Real Madrid B	51	(1)
2016–2017	→ Real Oviedo (loan)	39	(1)
2017–2018	Osasuna	37	(1)
2018–2020	Eintracht Frankfurt	15	(0)
2020–	Osasuna	188	(6)

International career^{‡}
2013–2014	Spain U19	3	(0)
- * Club domestic league appearances and goals as of 27 May 2026 ‡ National team caps and goals as of 22 December 2013

Lucas Torró Marset (born 19 July 1994) is a Spanish professional footballer who plays for La Liga club Osasuna as a central midfielder.

== Club career ==
=== Early career ===
Born in Cocentaina, Alicante, Valencian Community, Torró represented mainly Hércules CF and CD Alcoyano as a youth, aside from two other clubs in his native region. On 20 January 2012, while still a youth, he made his professional debut by coming on as a late substitute for Paco Esteban in a 2–2 home draw against UD Almería in the Segunda División. On 23 May he appeared in his second match, again from the bench in a 5–0 home loss against former club Hércules; he was also sent off during the match.

=== Real Madrid ===
In August 2012 Torró moved to Real Madrid for a fee of €100,000 with additional clauses based on his progression; it was also Alcoyano's most profitable transfer of its history. Initially assigned to the Juvenil squad, he was promoted to the reserves midway through the season.

==== Real Oviedo (loan) ====
On 18 July 2016, Torró was loaned to Real Oviedo in the second tier, for one year.

=== Osasuna ===
The following 6 July, he signed a three-year deal with CA Osasuna after his contract with Real Madrid expired.

=== Eintracht Frankfurt ===
On 2 July 2018, Osasuna announced that Eintracht Frankfurt would pay Torró's release clause of €1.75 million.

=== Return to Osasuna ===
On 5 August 2020, Torró returned to Osasuna in a transfer deal worth around €2 million. He signed a four-year contract with the club. On 9 June 2022, he signed an extension through 2027.

== International career ==
In 2013, he played the U19 European Championship in which Spain had a good tournament, being eliminated in the semifinals by France.

== Career statistics ==
=== Club ===
As of match played 27 February 2026

Appearances and goals by club, season and competition
Club	Season	League			National cup		Continental		Other		Total	
Club	Season	Division	Apps	Goals	Apps	Goals	Apps	Goals	Apps	Goals	Apps	Goals
Alcoyano	2011–12	Segunda División	2	0	0	0	—		—		2	0
Real Madrid B	2013–14	Segunda División	18	0	—		—		—		18	0
Real Madrid B	2014–15	Segunda División B	24	1	—		—		—		24	1
Real Madrid B	2015–16	Segunda División B	9	0	—		—		1 (Note: Appearance(s) in Promotion Playoffs)	0	10	0
Real Madrid B	Total		51	1	0	0	0	0	1	0	52	1
Real Oviedo (loan)	2016–17	Segunda División	39	1	1	0	—		—		40	1
Osasuna	2017–18	Segunda División	37	1	2	0	—		—		39	1
Eintracht Frankfurt	2018–19	Bundesliga	8	0	1	0	3 (Note: Appearance(s) in UEFA Europa League)	1	1 (Note: Appearance(s) in DFL-Supercup)	0	13	1
Eintracht Frankfurt	2019–20	Bundesliga	7	0	1	0	4	1	—		12	1
Eintracht Frankfurt	Total		15	0	2	0	7	2	1	0	25	2
Osasuna	2020–21	La Liga	25	0	2	0	—		—		27	0
Osasuna	2021–22	La Liga	33	1	0	0	—		—		33	1
Osasuna	2022–23	La Liga	33	1	5	1	—		—		38	2
Osasuna	2023–24	La Liga	28	1	2	0	2 (Note: Appearance(s) in UEFA Europa Conference League)	0	—		32	1
Osasuna	2024–25	La Liga	35	3	4	0	—		—		39	3
Osasuna	2025–26	La Liga	23	0	3	0	—		—		26	0
Osasuna	Total		177	6	16	1	2	0	0	0	195	7
Career total			321	9	21	1	9	2	2	0	353	12

== Honors ==
Eintracht Frankfurt

- DFL-Supercup runner-up: 2018

Osasuna

- Copa del Rey: runner-up 2022–23
