= Jorge Herrando =

Spanish footballer

Personal information
- Full name: Jorge Herrando Oroz
- Date of birth: 28 February 2001 (age 25)
- Place of birth: Pamplona, Spain
- Height: 1.90 m (6 ft 3 in)
- Position: Centre-back

Team information
- Current team: Osasuna
- Number: 5

Youth career
- Osasuna

Senior career*
Years	Team	Apps	(Gls)
2018–2023	Osasuna B	94	(8)
2020–	Osasuna	66	(1)
2021–2022	→ Logroñés (loan)	18	(0)

International career^{‡}
2018–2019	Spain U18	4	(0)
2025–	Basque Country	1	(0)
- * Club domestic league appearances and goals as of 27 May 2026 ‡ National team caps and goals as of 02:22, 17 November 2025 (UTC)

Jorge Herrando Oroz (born 28 February 2001) is a Spanish professional footballer who plays for CA Osasuna as a central defender.

== Club career ==
Born in Pamplona, Navarre, Herrando represented CA Osasuna as a youth. On 6 December 2017, while still a youth, he signed his first professional contract until 2019.

Herrando made his senior debut with the reserves on 13 May 2018, aged just 16, playing the last 16 minutes in a 4–0 Segunda División B away loss against CD Vitoria, as his side was already relegated. He scored his first senior goal on 11 October, netting the equalizer in a 1–1 home draw against UDC Txantrea, and further extended his deal until 2022 on 1 November.

Herrando made his first team debut on 15 December 2020, coming on as a second-half substitute for goalscorer Kike Saverio in a 6–0 away routing of UD Tomares, for the season's Copa del Rey. The following 15 July, he renewed his contract until 2024 and was immediately loaned to Primera División RFEF side UD Logroñés, for one year.

Upon returning, Herrando was assigned to the B-side now also in the third division. He made his La Liga debut on 2 May 2023, starting and being sent off in a 1–0 away loss against FC Barcelona.

== International career ==
Herrando was called up to the Basque Country national team for a friendly match against Palestine on 15 November 2025.

== Honours ==
Osasuna

- Copa del Rey: runner-up 2022–23
