= 2020–21 SD Eibar season =

Eibar
2020–21 season
- President: Amaia Gorostiza
- Head coach: José Luis Mendilibar
- Stadium: Ipurua Municipal Stadium
- La Liga: 20th (relegated)
- Copa del Rey: Round of 32
- Top goalscorer: League: Kike (12); All: Kike (12)
- Biggest win: Eibar 3–0 Alavés
- Biggest defeat: Atlético Madrid 5–0 Eibar
Home colours	Away colours	Third colours

The 2020–21 season was the 81st season in the existence of SD Eibar and the club's seventh consecutive season in the top flight of Spanish football. In addition to the domestic league, Eibar participated in this season's edition of the Copa del Rey. The season covered the period from 20 July 2020 to 30 June 2021, with the late start to the season due to the COVID-19 pandemic in Spain.

== Players ==
=== First-team squad ===
As of 19 January 2021

Note: Flags indicate national team as defined under FIFA eligibility rules; some limited exceptions apply. Players may hold more than one non-FIFA nationality.

No.	Pos.	Nation	Player
1	GK	SRB	Marko Dmitrović
2	DF	ARG	Esteban Burgos
3	DF	ESP	Pedro Bigas
4	DF	POR	Paulo Oliveira
6	MF	ESP	Sergio Álvarez
7	FW	ESP	Quique González
8	MF	SEN	Pape Diop
9	FW	ESP	Sergi Enrich (captain)
10	MF	ESP	Edu Expósito
11	DF	POR	Rafa Soares (on loan from Vitória de Guimarães)
12	FW	JPN	Yoshinori Muto (on loan from Newcastle United)
13	GK	ESP	Yoel

No.	Pos.	Nation	Player
14	MF	JPN	Takashi Inui
15	DF	ESP	José Ángel
17	FW	ESP	Kike (vice-captain)
18	MF	ESP	Recio (on loan from Leganés)
19	MF	ESP	Aleix García
20	DF	ESP	Rober Correa
21	MF	ESP	Pedro León
22	DF	ESP	Alejandro Pozo (on loan from Sevilla)
23	DF	ESP	Anaitz Arbilla
24	DF	POR	Kévin Rodrigues (on loan from Real Sociedad)
25	FW	ESP	Bryan Gil (on loan from Sevilla)

=== Out on loan ===
Note: Flags indicate national team as defined under FIFA eligibility rules; some limited exceptions apply. Players may hold more than one non-FIFA nationality.

No.	Pos.	Nation	Player
–	DF	ESP	Álvaro Tejero (at Zaragoza until 30 June 2021)
–	MF	ESP	Ekhi Bravo (at Real Unión until 30 June 2021)
–	MF	ESP	Roberto Olabe (at Tondela until 30 June 2021)

No.	Pos.	Nation	Player
–	MF	ESP	Miguel Marí (at Orihuela until 30 June 2021)
–	MF	POL	Damian Kądzior (at Alanyaspor until 30 June 2021)
–	FW	ESP	Asier Benito (at Numancia until 30 June 2021)

=== Youth squad ===
Note: Flags indicate national team as defined under FIFA eligibility rules; some limited exceptions apply. Players may hold more than one non-FIFA nationality.

No.	Pos.	Nation	Player
29	DF	ESP	Unai Dufur
28	FW	ESP	Eñaut Mendia
30	GK	ESP	Jonmi Magunagoitia
31	DF	ESP	Sergio Cubero

No.	Pos.	Nation	Player
32	FW	ESP	Unai Arieta
33	MF	ESP	Miguel Atienza
–	FW	ESP	Jaime Dios

== Transfers ==
=== In ===
No.	Pos	Player	Moving from	Type	Fee	Transfer window	Source
–	FW	(Spain) Roberto Olabe	Extremadura	Loan return		Summer	
–	FW	(Spain) Asier Benito	Ponferradina	Loan return		Summer	
–	FW	(Spain) Nano Mesa	Cádiz	Loan return		Summer	
–	DF	(Spain) José Martínez	Granada	Loan return		Summer	
–	DF	(Spain) Jordi Calavera	Girona	Loan return		Summer	
–	FW	(Poland) Damian Kądzior	(Croatia) Dinamo Zagreb	Transfer	2,000,000 €	Summer	
–	MF	(Spain) Recio	Leganés	Loan in		Summer	
–	DF	(Portugal) Kévin Rodrigues	Real Sociedad	Loan in		Summer	
–	FW	(Japan) Yoshinori Muto	(England) Newcastle United	Loan in		Summer	
–	DF	(Spain) Alejandro Pozo	Sevilla	Loan in		Summer	
–	MF	(Spain) Bryan Gil	Sevilla	Loan in		Summer	
–	MF	(Spain) Aleix García	(Romania) Dinamo București	Transfer in	Free	Winter	

▼2,000,000 €

=== Out ===
No.	Pos	Player	Moving to	Type	Fee	Transfer window	Source
5	MF	(Argentina) Gonzalo Escalante	(Italy) Lazio	End of contract		Summer	
14	FW	(Chile) Fabián Orellana	Real Valladolid	End of contract		Summer	
4	DF	(Spain) Iván Ramis	Retired			Summer	
18	MF	(Uruguay) Sebastián Cristóforo	(Italy) Fiorentina	Loan return		Summer	
19	FW	(Brazil) Charles	Pontevedra	End of contract		Summer	
16	MF	(Argentina) Pablo de Blasis	Free agent	End of contract		Summer	
–	FW	(Spain) Nano Mesa	Cádiz	Buyout clause	1,400,000 €	Summer	
–	DF	(Spain) Jordi Calavera	Girona	Contract rescinded		Summer	
–	MF	(Spain) Miguel Marí	Orihuela	Loan out		Summer	
–	FW	(Spain) Asier Benito	Numancia	Loan out		Summer	
22	DF	(Spain) Álvaro Tejero	Real Zaragoza	Loan out		Summer	
5	DF	(Spain) José Martínez	(United States) FC Dallas	Transfer	Undisclosed	Winter	
16	MF	(Spain) Roberto Olabe	(Portugal) Tondela	Loan out		Winter	
19	MF	(Poland) Damian Kądzior	(Turkey) Alanyaspor	Loan out		Winter	

▲1,400,000 €

== Pre-season and friendlies ==
Win Draw Loss

21 August 2020 Friendly	Eibar	3–0	Mirandés	Arrasate-Mondragón, Spain
18:30 CEST (UTC+2)	Benito 8'; Quique 41'; Kike 49'	Report		Stadium: Atxabalpe; Attendance: 0
Note: Due to the COVID-19 pandemic in Spain, the match was played behind closed doors.

28 August 2020 Friendly	Rayo Vallecano	0–1	Eibar	Madrid, Spain
10:00 CEST (UTC+2)		Report	Mendia 70'	Stadium: Ciudad Deportiva; Attendance: 0 Referee: Bueno Prieto (Community of Madrid)
Note: Due to the COVID-19 pandemic in Spain, the match was played behind closed doors.

29 August 2020 Friendly	Leganés	3–1	Eibar	Leganés, Spain
10:00 CEST (UTC+2)	Omeruo 3'; Rosales 12'; Arnaiz 40'	Report	Quique 90+1' (pen.)	Stadium: Instalación Deportiva Butarque; Attendance: 0 Referee: Pérez Muley (Community of Madrid)
Note: Due to the COVID-19 pandemic in Spain, the match was played behind closed doors.

4 September 2020 Friendly	Osasuna	1–1	Eibar	Pamplona, Spain
19:30 CEST (UTC+2)	Córdoba 42'	Report	Arieta 20'	Stadium: Tajonar; Attendance: 0 Referee: Imanol Irurzun (Navarre)
Note: Due to the COVID-19 pandemic in Spain, the match was played behind closed doors.

5 September 2020 Friendly	Athletic Bilbao	2–2	Eibar	Lezama, Spain
11:30 CEST (UTC+2)	R. García 10'; Morcillo 28'	Report	Quique 71'; Ewan 87' (o.g.)	Stadium: Lezama Facilities; Attendance: 0 Referee: Etayo Herrera (Basque Country)
Note: Due to the COVID-19 pandemic in Spain, the match was played behind closed doors.

9 October 2020 Friendly	Eibar	1–1	Real Unión	Arrasate-Mondragón, Spain
12:00 CEST (UTC+2)	Enrich 16'	Report	Beobide (yellow card) 55'; Viguera 57'	Stadium: Atxabalpe; Attendance: 0
Note: Due to the COVID-19 pandemic in Spain, the match was played behind closed doors.

25 March 2021 Friendly	Eibar	0–0	Osasuna	Arrasate-Mondragón, Spain
11:00 CET (UTC+1)		Report	Torres (yellow card)	Stadium: Atxabalpe; Attendance: 0 Referee: Ibai Rezola Etxeberria (Basque Country)
Note: Due to the COVID-19 pandemic in Spain, the match was played behind closed doors.

== Competitions ==
=== Overall record ===
Competition	First match	Last match	Starting round	Final position	Record							
Competition	First match	Last match	Starting round	Final position	Pld	W	D	L	GF	GA	GD	Win %
La Liga	12 September 2020	22 May 2021	Matchday 1	20th	38	6	12	20	29	52	−23	15.79
Copa del Rey	17 December 2020	17 January 2021	First round	Round of 32	3	2	0	1	7	6	+1	66.67
Total					41	8	12	21	36	58	−22	19.51

Source: Soccerway

=== La Liga ===
==== League table ====
Pos	Team	Pld	W	D	L	GF	GA	GD	Pts	Qualification or relegation
16	Alavés	38	9	11	18	36	57	−21	38	
17	Elche	38	8	12	18	34	55	−21	36	
18	Huesca (R)	38	7	13	18	34	53	−19	34	Relegation to Segunda División
19	Valladolid (R)	38	5	16	17	34	57	−23	31	Relegation to Segunda División
20	Eibar (R)	38	6	12	20	29	52	−23	30	Relegation to Segunda División

Source: La Liga
Rules for classification: 1) Points; 2) Head-to-head points; 3) Head-to-head goal difference; 4) Goal difference; 5) Goals scored; 6) Fair-play points (Note: Head-to-head record is used only after all the matches between the teams in question have been played)
(R) Relegated

==== Results summary ====
Overall								Home						Away					
Pld	W	D	L	GF	GA	GD	Pts	W	D	L	GF	GA	GD	W	D	L	GF	GA	GD
38	6	12	20	29	52	−23	30	2	7	10	12	21	−9	4	5	10	17	31	−14

Source: La Liga

==== Results by round ====
Round	1	2	3	4	5	6	7	8	9	10	11	12	13	14	15	16	17	18	19	20	21	22	23	24	25	26	27	28	29	30	31	32	33	34	35	36	37	38
Ground	H	A	H	H	A	H	A	H	A	H	A	H	A	H	A	A	H	A	H	A	H	A	H	A	H	A	H	A	A	H	A	H	A	H	A	H	A	H
Result	D	L	L	L	W	D	W	L	D	D	W	D	D	L	L	D	W	L	L	D	L	L	D	L	D	L	L	D	L	L	L	L	L	W	W	D	L	L
Position	10	11	18	19	14	15	11	15	16	16	12	11	11	14	17	16	12	15	15	15	15	17	17	17	16	18	19	18	19	20	20	20	20	20	20	20	20	20

Source: La Liga
A = Away; H = Home; W = Win; D = Draw; L = Loss

==== Matches ====
The league fixtures were announced on 31 August 2020.

12 September 2020 1	Eibar	0–0	Celta Vigo	Eibar
16:00 CEST (UTC+2)	Bigas (yellow card) 13'; Álvarez (yellow card) 41'; Diop (yellow card) 81' (yellow-red card) 87'	Report	Nolito (yellow card) 37'; Olaza (yellow card) 73'; Juncà (yellow card) 75'; Yokuşlu (yellow card) 78'	Stadium: Ipurua; Attendance: 0 (Note: The match was played behind closed doors due to the COVID-19 pandemic in Spain.); Referee: Pizarro Gómez (Community of Madrid)

19 September 2020 2	Villarreal	2–1	Eibar	Villarreal
16:00 CEST (UTC+2)	Coquelin (yellow card) 39'; Gerard 63'; Alcácer 71'	Report	Recio (yellow card) 24'; Kike 50'	Stadium: Estadio de la Cerámica; Attendance: 0 Referee: Figueroa Vázquez (Andalusia)

27 September 2020 3	Eibar	1–2	Athletic Bilbao	Eibar
14:00 CEST (UTC+2)	Kike 48'; Diop (yellow card) 90+10'	Report	López 40', 87'	Stadium: Ipurua; Attendance: 0 Referee: Cordero Vega (Cantabria)

30 September 2020 4	Eibar	0–1	Elche	Eibar
21:30 CEST (UTC+2)	Tejero (yellow card) 10'; Burgos (yellow card) 47'; Expósito (penalty missed) 52'	Report	Morente (yellow card) 28'; Boyé 37'; Josan (yellow card) 39'	Stadium: Ipurua; Attendance: 0 Referee: Jaime Latre (Aragon)

3 October 2020 5	Valladolid	1–2	Eibar	Valladolid
13:00 CEST (UTC+2)	Fede (yellow card) 23'; El Yamiq (yellow card) 31'; Toni 37'; Guardiola (penalty missed) 48'	Report	Burgos 29' (pen.), (yellow card) 59'; Zubikarai (yellow card) 55'; Diop (red card) 73'; Rodrigues 90'; Correa (yellow card) 90+6'	Stadium: José Zorrilla; Attendance: 0 Referee: Díaz de Mera Escuderos (Castilla-La Mancha)

18 October 2020 6	Eibar	0–0	Osasuna	Eibar
12:00 CEST (UTC+2)	Atienza (yellow card) 1'; Arbilla (yellow card) 62'	Report	Barja (yellow card) 26'; Moncayola (yellow card) 40' (yellow-red card) 88'	Stadium: Ipurua; Attendance: 0 Referee: Medié Jiménez (Catalunya)

24 October 2020 7	Sevilla	0–1	Eibar	Seville
18:30 CEST (UTC+2)		Report	Kike 41'; Rodrigues (yellow card) 44'; Expósito (yellow card) 74'; León (yellow card) 87'	Stadium: Ramón Sánchez Pizjuán; Attendance: 0 Referee: Hernández Hernández (Las Palmas)

30 October 2020 8	Eibar	0–2	Cádiz	Eibar
21:00 CET (UTC+1)	Burgos (yellow card) 70'	Report	Negredo 36'; Salvi 39'; Lozano (yellow card) 64'	Stadium: Ipurua; Attendance: 0 Referee: Mateu Lahoz (Valencian Community)

7 November 2020 9	Huesca	1–1	Eibar	Huesca
14:00 CET (UTC+1)	Mir 67'; Insua (yellow card) 89'; Doumbia (yellow card) 90+3'	Report	Burgos 38'	Stadium: El Alcoraz; Attendance: 0 Referee: Melero López (Andalusia)

22 November 2020 10	Eibar	0–0	Getafe	Eibar
14:00 CET (UTC+1)	Diop (yellow card) 45'; Kike (yellow card) 58' (yellow-red card) 88'	Report	Nyom (yellow card) 28'; Mata (yellow card) 80'; Olivera (yellow card) 86'; Chema (yellow card) 90+1'	Stadium: Ipurua; Attendance: 0 Referee: González Fuertes (Asturias)

30 November 2020 11	Real Betis	0–2	Eibar	Seville
21:00 CET (UTC+1)	Emerson (yellow card) 15'; Rodríguez (yellow card) 79'	Report	Muto 49'; Burgos 54' (pen.); Gil (yellow card) 64'; Enrich (penalty missed) 89'	Stadium: Benito Villamarín; Attendance: 0 Referee: Martínez Munuera (Valencian Community)

7 December 2020 12	Eibar	0–0	Valencia	Eibar
21:00 CET (UTC+1)	Burgos (yellow card) 42'; Arbilla (yellow card) 44'; Álvarez (yellow card) 69'	Report	Račić (yellow card) 57'; Gómez (yellow card) 90+3'	Stadium: Ipurua; Attendance: 0 Referee: Estrada Fernández (Catalunya)

13 December 2020 13	Real Sociedad	1–1	Eibar	San Sebastián
14:00 CET (UTC+1)	Sagnan (yellow card) 14'; Barrenetxea 20'; Muñoz (yellow card) 40'; Zaldúa (yellow card) 84'; Zubeldia (yellow card) 88'	Report	Expósito (yellow card) 7'; Burgos (yellow card) 53'; Enrich 65'; Arbilla (yellow card) 80'	Stadium: Reale Arena; Attendance: 0 Referee: Díaz de Mera Escuderos (Castile-La Mancha)

20 December 2020 14	Eibar	1–3	Real Madrid	Eibar
21:00 CET (UTC+1)	Kike 28'; Arbilla (yellow card) 43'	Report	Benzema 6'; Modrić 13'; Vázquez 90+2'	Stadium: Ipurua; Attendance: 0 Referee: Munuera Montero (Andalusia)

23 December 2020 15	Alavés	2–1	Eibar	Vitoria-Gasteiz
22:00 CET (UTC+1)	Méndez (yellow card) 38', (goal) 41'; Deyverson 45+2'; Battaglia (yellow card) 56'; Pina (yellow card) 62'; Laguardia (yellow card) 89'	Report	León 4'; Gil (yellow card) 81'; Arietaleanizbeaskoa (yellow card) 88'	Stadium: Mendizorrotza; Attendance: 0 Referee: Del Cerro Grande (Community of Madrid)

29 December 2020 16	Barcelona	1–1	Eibar	Barcelona
19:15 CET (UTC+1)	Braithwaite (penalty missed) 8'; Dembélé 67'	Report	Kike 57'; Álvarez (yellow card) 75'; Recio (yellow card) 83'	Stadium: Camp Nou; Attendance: 0 Referee: Alberola Rojas (Castille-La Mancha)

3 January 2021 17	Eibar	2–0	Granada	Eibar
18:30 CET (UTC+1)	Diop (yellow card) 4'; Expósito (yellow card) 27', (penalty missed) 55'; Gil 55', 76'	Report	Germán (yellow card) 40'	Stadium: Ipurua; Attendance: 0 Referee: Mateu Lahoz (Valencian Community)

10 January 2021 18	Levante	2–1	Eibar	Valencia
14:00 CET (UTC+1)	Malsa (yellow card) 48'; Melero 65'; Morales (yellow card) 66', (goal) 76'	Report	Inui 51'	Stadium: Ciutat de València; Attendance: 0 Referee: Estrada Fernández (Catalunya)

21 January 2021 19	Eibar	1–2	Atlético Madrid	Eibar
21:30 CET (UTC+1)	Dmitrović 12' (pen.); Arbilla (yellow card) 83'; Kike (yellow card) 90+1'; Pozo (yellow card) 90+4'	Report	Suárez 40', 89' (pen.); Felipe (yellow card) 62'; Savić (yellow card) 90'	Stadium: Ipurua; Attendance: 0 Referee: Melero López (Andalusia)

24 January 2021 20	Celta Vigo	1–1	Eibar	Vigo
18:30 CET (UTC+1)	Méndez 9', (yellow card) 66'; Tapia (yellow card) 35'; Yokuşlu (yellow card) 54'; Mina (yellow card) 80'	Report	Rafa (yellow card) 2'; Expósito (yellow card) 43'; Gil 53'; Recio (yellow card) 64'	Stadium: Balaídos; Attendance: 0 Referee: González Fuertes (Asturias)

30 January 2021 21	Eibar	0–2	Sevilla	Eibar
14:00 CET (UTC+1)	Oliveira (yellow card) 9'; Diop (yellow card) 17'; Arbilla (yellow card) 62'; Correa (yellow card) 78'	Report	Gómez (yellow card) 20'; Ocampos 28' (pen.); Jordán 55'; Munir (yellow card) 90+4'; Rakitić (yellow card) 90+4'	Stadium: Ipurua; Attendance: 0 Referee: Sánchez Martínez

7 February 2021 22	Osasuna	2–1	Eibar	Pamplona
18:30 CET (UTC+1)	Calleri 18'; Budimir 86'	Report	Kike 44'	Stadium: El Sadar; Attendance: 0 Referee: Figueroa Vázquez (Andalusia)

13 February 2021 23	Eibar	1–1	Valladolid	Eibar
18:30 CET (UTC+1)	Kike 23'; Rafa (yellow card) 39'; Pozo (yellow card) 63'	Report	Mesa 7' (pen.); Pérez (yellow card) 79'; Olaza (yellow card) 85'; Orellana (yellow card) 90+3'	Stadium: Ipurua; Attendance: 0 Referee: Díaz De Mera Escuderos (Castilla-La Mancha)

20 February 2021 24	Elche	1–0	Eibar	Elche
14:00 CET (UTC+1)	Calvo 33'; Gonzalo (yellow card) 42'; Marcone (yellow card) 53'	Report	Gil (yellow card) 90+2'	Stadium: Martínez Valero; Attendance: 0 Referee: Cordero Vega (Cantabria)

27 February 2021 25	Eibar	1–1	Huesca	Eibar
14:00 CET (UTC+1)	José Ángel (yellow card) 60'; León (yellow card) 73'; Diop 83'	Report	Galán (yellow card) 36'; Maffeo (yellow card) 40'; Sandro 81'	Stadium: Ipurua; Attendance: 0 Referee: González Fuertes (Asturias)

6 March 2021 26	Cádiz	1–0	Eibar	Cádiz
18:30 CET (UTC+1)	Negredo 40'; José Mari (yellow card) 51'; Jairo (yellow card) 90+7'	Report	Enrich (yellow card) 17'; José Ángel (yellow card) 34'; Dmitrović (penalty missed) 57'	Stadium: Ramón de Carranza; Attendance: 0 Referee: Del Cerro Grande (Community of Madrid)

14 March 2021 27	Eibar	1–3	Villarreal	Eibar
18:30 CET (UTC+1)	Burgos (penalty missed) 42'; Arbilla (yellow card) 51'; Enrich 55'; Gil (yellow card) 56'	Report	Gómez 1'; Bacca 34'; Pedraza (yellow card) 70', (goal) 87'; Capoue (red card) 80'; Asenjo (yellow card) 86'	Stadium: Ipurua; Attendance: 0 Referee: Medié Jiménez (Catalunya)

20 March 2021 28	Athletic Bilbao	1–1	Eibar	Bilbao
14:00 CET (UTC+1)	Berchiche 9'; Martínez (yellow card) 56'	Report	Kike 17'; Pozo (yellow card) 74'	Stadium: San Mamés; Attendance: 0 Referee: Pizarro Gómez (Community of Madrid)

3 April 2021 29	Real Madrid	2–0	Eibar	Madrid
16:15 CEST (UTC+2)	Asensio 41'; Benzema 73'	Report	Gil (yellow card) 20'; Pozo (yellow card) 90+4'	Stadium: Alfredo Di Stéfano; Attendance: 0 Referee: Díaz de Mera Escuderos (Castilla-La Mancha)

10 April 2021 30	Eibar	0–1	Levante	Eibar
18:30 CEST (UTC+2)	Diop (yellow card) 15'; García (yellow card) 60'; Arbilla (yellow card) 65'	Report	Clerc (yellow card) 17'; Postigo (yellow card) 38'; De Frutos 45+2'	Stadium: Ipurua; Attendance: 0 Referee: Estrada Fernández (Catalunya)

18 April 2021 33	Atlético Madrid	5–0	Eibar	Madrid
16:15 CEST (UTC+2)	Correa 42', 44'; Carrasco 49'; Llorente 53', 68'	Report	Oliveira (yellow card) 88'	Stadium: Wanda Metropolitano; Attendance: 0 Referee: Soto Grado
Note: The match was originally scheduled for 28 April 2021, but was brought forward by La Liga.

22 April 2021 31	Granada	4–1	Eibar	Granada
21:00 CEST (UTC+2)	Soldado 21', 77'; Puertas 37'; Molina (yellow card) 41'; Kenedy 81'	Report	Recio (yellow card) 42'; Kike 64'	Stadium: Nuevo Los Cármenes; Attendance: 0 Referee: Jaime Latre (Aragon)

26 April 2021 32	Eibar	0–1	Real Sociedad	Eibar
21:00 CEST (UTC+2)	Recio (yellow card) 4'; Oliveira (yellow card) 31'; José Ángel (yellow card) 43'; Gil (yellow card) 43'; Muto (yellow card) 80'	Report	Isak 26'; Zubimendi (yellow card) 81'	Stadium: Ipurua; Attendance: 0 Referee: Figueroa Vázquez (Andalusia)

1 May 2021 34	Eibar	3–0	Alavés	Eibar
14:00 CEST (UTC+2)	Kike 3', 50', 59'	Report	Pina (yellow card) 44'; Battaglia (yellow card) 57'	Stadium: Ipurua; Attendance: 0 Referee: Munuera Montero (Andalusia)

9 May 2021 35	Getafe	0–1	Eibar	Getafe
14:00 CEST (UTC+2)	Timor (yellow card) 82'	Report	Kike (yellow card) 40'; Diop (yellow card) 67'; Recio 89' (pen.)	Stadium: Coliseum Alfonso Pérez; Attendance: 0 Referee: Alberola Rojas (Castille-La Mancha)

13 May 2021 36	Eibar	1–1	Real Betis	Eibar
20:00 CEST (UTC+2)	Diop (yellow card) 34'; Oliveira (yellow card) 38'; Correa (yellow card) 52'; Enrich 83'	Report	Guardado 4'; Emerson (yellow card) 65'	Stadium: Ipurua; Attendance: 0 Referee: Díaz de Mera Escuderos (Castilla-La Mancha)

16 May 2021 37	Valencia	4–1	Eibar	Valencia
18:30 CEST (UTC+2)	Guedes 3', 49'; Soler 19', 30'	Report	Gil 39'	Stadium: Mestalla; Attendance: 0 Referee: Pizarro Gómez (Community of Madrid)

22 May 2021 38	Eibar	0–1	Barcelona	Eibar
18:00 CEST (UTC+2)		Report	Firpo (yellow card) 23'; Busquets (yellow card) 74'; Araújo (yellow card) 78'; Griezmann 81'	Stadium: Ipurua; Attendance: 0 Referee: Jaime Latre (Aragon)

=== Copa del Rey ===
17 December 2020 First round	Racing Rioja	0–2	Eibar	Haro (Note: Racing Rioja did not play its game in its main stadium El Salvador, in Logroño, as it does not meet the requirements to broadcast the match.)
21:00 CET (UTC+1)	Diego Martinez (yellow card) 61'	Report	León 36', 82'; Dufur (yellow card) 52'	Stadium: El Mazo; Referee: Jaime Latre (Aragon)

7 January 2021 Second round	Las Rozas	3–4 (a.e.t.)	Eibar	Las Rozas de Madrid
21:00 CET (UTC+1)	Losada 73'; Mingo 76'; Galvan 79'; Díez (yellow card) 93'	Report	Muto 14', (yellow card) 69'; Quique 18'; Burgos (yellow card) 35'; León 69'; Rafa (yellow card) 75'; Recio (yellow card) 102'; Enrich 108'	Stadium: Navalcarbón; Referee: Melero López (Andalusia)

17 January 2021 Round of 32	Navalcarnero	3–1	Eibar	Navalcarnero
16:00 CET (UTC+1)	Jaimez 30' (pen.); Esnáider 61', 79', (yellow card) 67'	Report	Muto 16'; Burgos (yellow card) 29'; Álvarez (yellow card) 50'	Stadium: Mariano González; Referee: Cordero Vega (Cantabria)

== Squad statistics ==
Last updated on 1 February 2021

No.	Nat	Name	La Liga					Copa del Rey					Total				
No.	Nat	Name	Apps	Goals	Yellow card	Second yellow card	Red card	Apps	Goals	Yellow card	Second yellow card	Red card	Apps	Goals	Yellow card	Second yellow card	Red card
Goalkeepers
1	(Serbia)	Marko Dmitrović	21	1	0	0	0	0	0	0	0	0	21	1	0	0	0
13	(Spain)	Yoel	0+1	0	0	0	0	3	0	0	0	0	4	0	0	0	0
Defenders
2	(Argentina)	Esteban Burgos	10+1	3	5	0	0	3	0	2	0	0	14	3	7	0	0
3	(Spain)	Pedro Bigas	16+1	0	1	0	0	0+1	0	0	0	0	18	0	1	0	0
4	(Portugal)	Paulo Oliveira	14+1	0	1	0	0	0	0	0	0	0	15	0	1	0	0
11	(Portugal)	Rafa Soares	6+2	0	1	0	0	1+1	0	0	0	0	10	0	1	0	0
15	(Spain)	Cote	0	0	0	0	0	0	0	0	0	0	0	0	0	0	0
20	(Spain)	Rober Correa	8+1	0	2	0	0	0+1	0	1	0	0	10	0	3	0	0
22	(Spain)	Alejandro Pozo	14+1	0	1	0	0	1+1	0	0	0	0	16	0	1	0	0
23	(Spain)	Anaitz Arbilla	14+3	0	6	0	0	3	0	0	0	0	20	0	6	0	0
24	(Portugal)	Kévin Rodrigues	9+3	1	1	0	0	2	0	0	0	0	14	1	1	0	0
29	(Spain)	Unai Dufur	0	0	0	0	0	1	0	1	0	0	1	0	1	0	0
31	(Spain)	Sergio Cubero	0+1	0	0	0	0	1+1	0	0	0	0	3	0	0	0	0
Midfielders
6	(Spain)	Sergio Álvarez	13+4	0	3	0	0	3	0	1	0	0	20	0	4	0	0
8	(Senegal)	Pape Diop	15+2	0	4	1	1	1	0	0	0	0	18	0	4	1	1
10	(Spain)	Edu Expósito	17+3	0	4	0	0	1+2	0	0	0	0	23	0	4	0	0
14	(Japan)	Takashi Inui	18+1	1	0	0	0	1+1	0	0	0	0	21	1	0	0	0
18	(Spain)	Recio	4+5	0	3	0	0	2+1	0	1	0	0	12	0	4	0	0
19	(Spain)	Aleix García	0+2	0	0	0	0	0	0	0	0	0	2	0	0	0	0
21	(Spain)	Pedro León	10+7	1	1	0	0	3	3	0	0	0	20	4	1	0	0
25	(Spain)	Bryan Gil	12+1	3	2	0	0	0+1	0	0	0	0	14	3	1	0	0
33	(Spain)	Miguel Atienza	1+1	0	1	0	0	0	0	0	0	0	2	0	1	0	0
Forwards
7	(Spain)	Quique González	0+6	0	0	0	0	2	1	0	0	0	8	1	0	0	0
9	(Spain)	Sergi Enrich	3+9	1	0	0	0	0+1	1	0	0	0	13	2	0	0	0
12	(Japan)	Yoshinori Muto	11+6	1	0	0	0	2	2	1	0	0	19	3	1	0	0
17	(Spain)	Kike	19+1	5	2	1	0	0+1	0	0	0	0	21	5	2	1	0
28	(Spain)	Eñaut Mendia	1	0	1	0	0	0	0	0	0	0	1	0	1	0	0
32	(Spain)	Unai Arieta	0+3	0	1	0	0	1	0	0	0	0	4	0	1	0	0
Players who have left the club during the season
5	(Spain)	José Martínez	0	0	0	0	0	0	0	0	0	0	0	0	0	0	0
16	(Spain)	Roberto Olabe	0	0	0	0	0	1+1	0	0	0	0	2	0	0	0	0
19	(Poland)	Damian Kądzior	2+4	0	0	0	0	2	0	0	0	0	8	0	0	0	0
22	(Spain)	Álvaro Tejero	1+1	0	1	0	0	0	0	0	0	0	2	0	1	0	0
Team Total													24	24	46	2	1
