= 2020–21 CA Osasuna season =

Osasuna
2020–21 season
- President: Luis Sabalza
- Head coach: Jagoba Arrasate
- Stadium: El Sadar
- La Liga: 11th
- Copa del Rey: Round of 16
- Top goalscorer: League: Ante Budimir (11); All: Ante Budimir (12)
- Biggest win: Tomares 0–6 Osasuna
- Biggest defeat: Barcelona 4–0 Osasuna
Home colours	Away colours	Third colours

The 2020–21 season was the 90th season in the existence of CA Osasuna and the club's second consecutive season in the top flight of Spanish football. In addition to the domestic league, Osasuna participated in this season's edition of the Copa del Rey. The season covered the period from 20 July 2020 to 30 June 2021, with the late start to the season due to the COVID-19 pandemic in Spain.

== Players ==
=== First-team squad ===
As of 1 February 2021

Note: Flags indicate national team as defined under FIFA eligibility rules; some limited exceptions apply. Players may hold more than one non-FIFA nationality.

No.	Pos.	Nation	Player
1	GK	ESP	Sergio Herrera
2	DF	ESP	Nacho Vidal
3	DF	ESP	Juan Cruz
4	DF	ESP	Unai García
5	DF	ESP	David García
6	MF	ESP	Oier (Captain)
7	MF	ESP	Jony (on loan from Lazio)
8	MF	SRB	Darko Brašanac
9	FW	ARG	Chimy Ávila
10	MF	ESP	Roberto Torres (2nd captain)
11	MF	ESP	Kike Barja
12	DF	ARG	Facundo Roncaglia
13	GK	ESP	Rubén Martínez
14	MF	ESP	Rubén García
15	DF	ANG	Jonás Ramalho (on loan from Girona)

No.	Pos.	Nation	Player
16	FW	ARG	Jonathan Calleri (on loan from Maldonado)
17	FW	CRO	Ante Budimir (on loan from Mallorca)
19	FW	ESP	Enric Gallego
20	FW	ESP	Adrián López
21	MF	ESP	Iñigo Pérez
23	DF	ESP	Aridane
24	MF	ESP	Lucas Torró
25	GK	ESP	Juan Pérez
27	MF	ESP	Jon Moncayola
30	DF	ESP	Gorka Zabarte
31	DF	ESP	Jorge Herrando
28	MF	ESP	Javi Martínez
29	MF	ESP	Aimar Oroz
32	MF	ESP	Asier Córdoba
39	DF	ESP	Manu Sánchez (on loan from Atlético Madrid)

=== Reserve team ===
Note: Flags indicate national team as defined under FIFA eligibility rules; some limited exceptions apply. Players may hold more than one non-FIFA nationality.

No.	Pos.	Nation	Player
26	GK	ESP	Iñaki Álvarez
36	GK	ESP	Iván Martínez

=== Out on loan ===
Note: Flags indicate national team as defined under FIFA eligibility rules; some limited exceptions apply. Players may hold more than one non-FIFA nationality.

No.	Pos.	Nation	Player
—	MF	ESP	Jaume Grau (at Tondela until 30 June 2021)
—	MF	ESP	Antonio Otegui (at Badajoz until 30 June 2022)
—	MF	ESP	Rober (at Leganés until 30 June 2021)
—	MF	ESP	Kike Saverio (at Andorra until 30 June 2021)

No.	Pos.	Nation	Player
—	FW	ESP	Iván Barbero (at Alcorcón until 30 June 2021)
—	FW	ESP	Brandon (at Leganés until 30 June 2021)
—	FW	ESP	Marc Cardona (at Mallorca until 30 June 2021)

== Transfers ==
=== In ===
Date	Player	From	Type	Fee	Ref
21 July 2020	(Spain) Jaume Grau	Lugo	Loan return		
21 July 2020	(Spain) Antonio Otegui	Numancia	Loan return		
21 July 2020	(Spain) Luis Perea	Alcorcón	Loan return		
21 July 2020	(Spain) Juan Villar	Rayo Vallecano	Loan return		
4 August 2020	(Spain) Raúl Navas	Real Sociedad	Buyout clause	€250K	
6 August 2020	(Spain) Enric Gallego	Getafe	Buyout clause	€2M	
7 August 2020	(Spain) Lucas Torró	(Germany) Eintracht Frankfurt	Transfer	€2M	
24 August 2020	(Spain) Brandon Thomas	Girona	Loan return		
30 August 2020	(Spain) Juan Cruz	Elche	Transfer	€2.75M	
13 September 2020	(Argentina) Jonathan Calleri	(Uruguay) Deportivo Maldonado	Loan		
20 September 2020	(Spain) Jony	(Italy) Lazio	Loan		
5 October 2020	(Croatia) Ante Budimir	Mallorca	Loan		

=== Out ===
Date	Player	To	Type	Fee	Ref
20 July 2020	(Spain) José Arnaiz	Leganés	Loan return		
20 July 2020	(Ecuador) Pervis Estupiñán	(England) Watford	Loan return		
20 July 2020	(Spain) Toni Lato	Valencia	Loan return		
19 August 2020	(Spain) Fran Mérida	Espanyol	Transfer	Free	
23 August 2020	(Spain) Antonio Otegui	Badajoz	Loan		
24 August 2020	(Spain) Jaume Grau	(Portugal) Tondela	Loan		
24 August 2020	(Spain) Robert Ibáñez	Leganés	Loan		
27 August 2020	(Spain) Luis Perea	Leganés	Transfer	€3M	
28 August 2020	(Spain) Iván Barbero	Alcorcón	Loan		
5 October 2020	(Spain) Marc Cardona	Mallorca	Loan		

== Pre-season and friendlies ==
Win Draw Loss

26 August 2020 Friendly	Mirandés	0–2	Osasuna	Miranda de Ebro, Spain
19:30 CEST (UTC+2)		Report	Roncaglia 50'; Gallego 85'	Stadium: Estadio Municipal de Anduva; Attendance: 0 Referee: Gorka Mazo Naruto

29 August 2020 Friendly	Osasuna	2–1	Alavés	Pamplona, Spain
11:00 CEST (UTC+2)	Adrián 8'; Martínez 51'	Report	Méndez 16'	Stadium: Tajonar Facilities; Attendance: 0 Referee: David Recio Moreno

4 September 2020 Friendly	Osasuna	1–1	Eibar	Pamplona, Spain
19:00 CEST (UTC+2)	Córdoba 42'	Report	Arieta 20'	Stadium: Tajonar Facilities; Attendance: 0 Referee: Imanol Irurtzun Artola

5 September 2020 EH Txapela	Real Sociedad	1–0	Osasuna	San Sebastián, Spain
19:00 CEST (UTC+2)	Willian José 32' (pen.)	Report	Herrera (yellow card) 30'; Roncaglia (yellow card) 73'	Stadium: Anoeta; Attendance: 0 Referee: Ibai Rezola Etxeberria

8 October 2020 Friendly	Alavés	0–0	Osasuna	Vitoria-Gasteiz, Spain
11:00 CEST (UTC+2)		Report		Stadium: Ciudad Deportiva José Luis Compañón; Attendance: 0 Referee: Aitor Barrio Salas

25 March 2021 Friendly	Eibar	0–0	Osasuna	Arrasate-Mondragón, Spain
11:00 CET (UTC+1)		Report	Torres (yellow card)	Stadium: Atxabalpe; Attendance: 0 Referee: Ibai Rezola Etxeberria

== Competitions ==
=== Overview ===
Competition	First match	Last match	Starting round	Final position	Record							
Competition	First match	Last match	Starting round	Final position	Pld	W	D	L	GF	GA	GD	Win %
La Liga	12 September 2020	22 May 2021	Matchday 1	11th	38	11	11	16	37	48	−11	28.95
Copa del Rey	15 December 2020	27 January 2021	First round	Round of 16	4	3	1	0	11	0	+11	75.00
Total					42	14	12	16	48	48	+0	33.33

Source: Soccerway

=== La Liga ===
==== League table ====
Pos	Team	Pld	W	D	L	GF	GA	GD	Pts
9	Granada	38	13	7	18	47	65	−18	46 (Note: Granada finished ahead of Athletic Bilbao on head-to-head goal difference: Granada 2–0 Athletic Bilbao, Athletic Bilbao 2–1 Granada.)
10	Athletic Bilbao	38	11	13	14	46	42	+4	46
11	Osasuna	38	11	11	16	37	48	−11	44 (Note: Osasuna finished ahead of Cádiz on head-to-head points: Cádiz 0–2 Osasuna, Osasuna 3–2 Cádiz.)
12	Cádiz	38	11	11	16	36	58	−22	44
13	Valencia	38	10	13	15	50	53	−3	43

Source: La Liga
Rules for classification: 1) Points; 2) Head-to-head points; 3) Head-to-head goal difference; 4) Goal difference; 5) Goals scored; 6) Fair-play points (Note: Head-to-head record is used only after all the matches between the teams in question have been played)

==== Results summary ====
Overall								Home						Away					
Pld	W	D	L	GF	GA	GD	Pts	W	D	L	GF	GA	GD	W	D	L	GF	GA	GD
38	11	11	16	37	48	−11	44	7	5	7	21	23	−2	4	6	9	16	25	−9

Source: La Liga

==== Results by round ====
Round	1	2	3	4	5	6	7	8	9	10	11	12	13	14	15	16	17	18	19	20	21	22	23	24	25	26	27	28	29	30	31	32	33	34	35	36	37	38
Ground	A	A	H	A	H	A	H	H	A	H	A	H	A	H	A	H	A	H	A	H	A	H	A	H	A	H	H	A	H	A	H	A	H	A	A	H	A	H
Result	W	L	L	L	W	D	W	L	L	D	L	L	L	L	D	D	D	D	D	W	L	W	W	L	W	L	D	D	D	W	W	L	W	L	D	W	L	L
Position	3	6	13	14	11	11	7	9	13	14	16	18	20	20	20	19	19	19	19	17	17	15	12	13	12	13	13	13	14	14	12	11	11	11	12	11	10	11

Source: La Liga
A = Away; H = Home; W = Win; D = Draw; L = Loss

==== Matches ====
The league fixtures were announced on 31 August 2020.

12 September 2020 1	Cádiz	0–2	Osasuna	Cádiz
21:00 CEST (UTC+2)	Malbašić (yellow card) 58'; Alejo (yellow card) 90'	Report	Adrián 10'; D. García (yellow card) 35'; Cruz (yellow card) 65'; R. García 79'	Stadium: Estadio Ramón de Carranza; Attendance: 0 (Note: The match was played behind closed doors due to the COVID-19 pandemic in Spain.); Referee: Isidro Díaz de Mera Escuderos

19 September 2020 2	Getafe	1–0	Osasuna	Getafe
18:30 CEST (UTC+2)	Maksimović (yellow card) 16'; Mata 54'; Cucurella (yellow card) 57'; Arambarri (yellow card) 89'; Suárez (yellow card) 90+3'	Report	Aridane (yellow card) 64'	Stadium: Coliseum Alfonso Pérez; Attendance: 0 Referee: Alejandro Hernández Hernández

27 September 2020 3	Osasuna	1–3	Levante	Pamplona
12:00 CEST (UTC+2)	Torres 38'; Vidal (yellow card) 74'; Torró (yellow card) 90+2'	Report	Melero 41'; Roger (penalty missed) 71', 77'; Morales 81'	Stadium: El Sadar; Attendance: 0 Referee: Mario Melero López

4 October 2020 5	Osasuna	2–0	Celta Vigo	Pamplona
12:00 CEST (UTC+2)	Roncaglia 23'; D. García (yellow card) 55'; Oier (yellow card) 60'; Calleri 76'; R. García (yellow card) 82'	Report	Tapia (yellow card) 26'; Rodríguez (yellow card) 82'; Murillo (yellow card) 90+1'	Stadium: El Sadar; Attendance: 0 Referee: Ricardo De Burgos Bengoetxea

18 October 2020 6	Eibar	0–0	Osasuna	Eibar
12:00 CEST (UTC+2)	Atienza (yellow card) 1'; Arbilla (yellow card) 62'	Report	Barja (yellow card) 26'; Moncayola (yellow card) 40' (yellow-red card) 88'	Stadium: Ipurua; Attendance: 0 Referee: David Medié Jiménez

24 October 2020 7	Osasuna	1–0	Athletic Bilbao	Pamplona
18:30 CEST (UTC+2)	D. García (yellow card) 16'; Oier (yellow card) 54'; Vidal (yellow card) 63'; Ru. García 81' (pen.)	Report	Álvarez (yellow card) 24'; Ra. García (yellow card) 26'	Stadium: El Sadar; Attendance: 0 Referee: Guillermo Cuadra Fernández

31 October 2020 8	Osasuna	1–3	Atlético Madrid	Pamplona
18:30 CET (UTC+1)	Herrera (yellow card) 42'; Budimir 80'	Report	Félix 43' (pen.), 69', (penalty missed) 48'; Koke (yellow card) 72'; Torreira 88'; Llorente (yellow card) 90+1'	Stadium: El Sadar; Attendance: 0 Referee: Xavier Estrada Fernández

7 November 2020 9	Sevilla	1–0	Osasuna	Seville
18:30 CET (UTC+1)	Ocampos 59' (pen.); Rakitić (yellow card) 77'; Fernando (yellow card) 87'	Report	U. García (yellow card) 38'; Oier (yellow card) 80'; D. García (yellow card) 90+1'	Stadium: Ramón Sánchez Pizjuán; Attendance: 0 Referee: Juan Martínez Munuera

20 November 2020 10	Osasuna	1–1	Huesca	Pamplona
21:00 CET (UTC+1)	Budimir (yellow card) 41'; D. García 68'; Pérez (yellow card) 75'	Report	Sandro 5'; Insua (yellow card) 21'; López (yellow card) 74'; Nwakali (yellow card) 90+2'	Stadium: El Sadar; Attendance: 0 Referee: Valentín Pizarro Gómez

29 November 2020 11	Barcelona	4–0	Osasuna	Barcelona
14:00 CET (UTC+1)	Braithwaite 29'; Griezmann 42'; Coutinho 57'; Messi 73', (yellow card) 76'	Report		Stadium: Camp Nou; Attendance: 0 Referee: Antonio Mateu Lahoz

6 December 2020 12	Osasuna	0–2	Real Betis	Pamplona
16:15 CET (UTC+1)	Aridane (yellow card) 29'; Brašanac (yellow card) 32'; Pérez (yellow card) 43'	Report	Ruiz (yellow card) 51'; Loren (yellow card) 63'; Iglesias 76'; Miranda 90+1'	Stadium: El Sadar; Attendance: 0 Referee: Alejandro Hernández Hernández

11 December 2020 13	Valladolid	3–2	Osasuna	Valladolid
21:00 CET (UTC+1)	Weissman 7', 76', (yellow card) 84'; Mesa (yellow card) 24'; Alcaraz (yellow card) 45'; Orellana 56' (pen.); Pérez (yellow card) 90+5'	Report	Aridane (yellow card) 12'; Budimir 27', (yellow card) 80'; Torres 43'; Moncayola (yellow card) 66'; Vidal (yellow card) 71'; Calleri (yellow card) 82'	Stadium: Estadio José Zorrilla; Attendance: 0 Referee: Adrián Cordero Vega

19 December 2020 14	Osasuna	1–3	Villarreal	Pamplona
18:30 CET (UTC+1)	Aridane (red card) 19'; Oier (yellow card) 40'; Torres 70' (pen.); U. García (yellow card) 79'	Report	Gerard 7', 86', (yellow card) 83'; Niño 29'; Pino (yellow card) 69'	Stadium: El Sadar; Attendance: 0 Referee: Jorge Figueroa Vázquez

22 December 2020 15	Elche	2–2	Osasuna	Elche
17:30 CET (UTC+1)	Fidel 46'; Carrillo 78', (yellow card) 84'	Report	R. García 10'; Brašanac 64'; Pérez (yellow card) 73' (yellow-red card) 90+2'	Stadium: Estadio Manuel Martínez Valero; Attendance: 0 Referee: Ricardo de Burgos Bengoetxea

31 December 2020 16	Osasuna	1–1	Alavés	Pamplona
16:15 CET (UTC+1)	Rubén (red card) 8'; Calleri (yellow card) 41'; Herrera (yellow card) 64'; Torres 67'; Oier (yellow card) 73'	Report	Pina (yellow card) 37'; Deyverson (yellow card) 40'; Lejeune (yellow card) 55'; Pérez 75' (pen.); Jota (yellow card) 82'	Stadium: El Sadar; Attendance: 0 Referee: Santiago Jaime Latre

3 January 2021 17	Real Sociedad	1–1	Osasuna	San Sebastián
18:30 CET (UTC+1)	Barrenetxea 46'; Zubeldia (yellow card) 76'	Report	Calleri 20'; Roncaglia (yellow card) 88'	Stadium: Anoeta; Attendance: 0 Referee: Valentín Pizarro Gómez

9 January 2021 18	Osasuna	0–0	Real Madrid	Pamplona
21:00 CET (UTC+1)		Report		Stadium: El Sadar; Attendance: 0 Referee: César Soto Grado

12 January 2021 4	Granada	2–0	Osasuna	Granada
19:00 CET (UTC+1)	Suárez 22'; Machís 45+1'; Duarte (yellow card) 90'	Report	Oier (yellow card) 36'; R. García (yellow card) 40'; D. García (yellow card) 67'; Gallego (yellow card) 76'	Stadium: Nuevo Los Cármenes; Attendance: 0 Referee: Pablo González Fuertes
Note: The match originally scheduled for 30 September 2020, but postponed due to Granada's involvement in the UEFA Europa League.

21 January 2021 19	Valencia	1–1	Osasuna	Valencia
19:00 CET (UTC+1)	Wass (yellow card) 60'; U. García 69' (o.g.)	Report	Calleri 42'; Vidal (yellow card) 45+1'; Cruz (yellow card) 71'; Sánchez (yellow card) 77'	Stadium: Mestalla; Attendance: 0 Referee: Alejandro Hernández Hernández

24 January 2021 20	Osasuna	3–1	Granada	Pamplona
14:00 CET (UTC+1)	Budimir 27', 39'; Sánchez (yellow card) 37'; Roncaglia (yellow card) 63' (yellow-red card) 88'; Calleri (yellow card) 74'; Moncayola 86'; Torró (yellow card) 90+6'	Report	Vallejo (yellow card) 11'; Foulquier (yellow card) 38'; Suárez 50'; Duarte (yellow card) 77'; Germán (yellow card) 90+6'	Stadium: El Sadar; Attendance: 0 Referee: Xavier Estrada Fernández

1 February 2021 21	Real Betis	1–0	Osasuna	Seville
21:00 CET (UTC+1)	Iglesias 79'; Robles (yellow card) 87'	Report	Moncayola (yellow card) 59'	Stadium: Benito Villamarín; Attendance: 0 Referee: Javier Alberola Rojas

7 February 2021 22	Osasuna	2–1	Eibar	Pamplona
18:30 CET (UTC+1)	Calleri 18'; Budimir 86'	Report	Kike 44'	Stadium: El Sadar; Attendance: 0 Referee: Jorge Figueroa Vázquez

14 February 2021 23	Levante	0–1	Osasuna	Valencia
18:30 CET (UTC+1)	Toño (yellow card) 41'; Morales (penalty missed) 79'	Report	Calleri (yellow card) 9'; Moncayola (yellow card) 25'; Budimir 74'	Stadium: Ciutat de València; Attendance: 0 Referee: Santiago Jaime Latre

22 February 2021 24	Osasuna	0–2	Sevilla	Pamplona
21:00 CET (UTC+1)	Vidal (yellow card) 76'; Torró (yellow card) 88'	Report	Diego Carlos 19'; De Jong 49'; Munir (yellow card) 67'; Jordán (yellow card) 83'	Stadium: El Sadar; Attendance: 0 Referee: Javier Alberola Rojas

27 February 2021 25	Alavés	0–1	Osasuna	Vitoria-Gasteiz
18:30 CET (UTC+1)	Pina (yellow card) 44'; Laguardia (yellow card) 68'; Pérez (yellow card) 82'	Report	U. García (yellow card) 30'; Vidal (yellow card) 40'; D. García (yellow card) 65'; Cruz (yellow card) 73'; Barja 77'	Stadium: Mendizorrotza; Attendance: 0 Referee: José María Sánchez Martínez

6 March 2021 26	Osasuna	0–2	Barcelona	Pamplona
21:00 CET (UTC+1)		Report	Umtiti (yellow card) 26'; Alba 30'; Moriba 83'; Firpo (yellow card) 88'	Stadium: El Sadar; Attendance: 0 Referee: Guillermo Cuadra Fernández

13 March 2021 27	Osasuna	0–0	Valladolid	Pamplona
18:30 CET (UTC+1)	Barja (yellow card) 24'; Moncayola (yellow card) 84'	Report	Guardiola (yellow card) 21'; Joaquín (yellow card) 34'; Weissman (yellow card) 56'	Stadium: El Sadar; Attendance: 0 Referee: Ricardo de Burgos Bengoetxea

20 March 2021 28	Huesca	0–0	Osasuna	Huesca
18:30 CET (UTC+1)	Siovas (yellow card) 39'	Report	Moncayola (yellow card) 61'; Vidal (yellow card) 66'	Stadium: El Alcoraz; Attendance: 0 Referee: Carlos del Cerro Grande

3 April 2021 29	Osasuna	0–0	Getafe	Pamplona
18:30 CEST (UTC+2)	Oier (yellow card) 46'; D. García (yellow card) 68'	Report	Chakla (yellow card) 2'; Cucurella (yellow card) 49'; Mata (yellow card) 90+3'	Stadium: El Sadar; Attendance: 0 Referee: Pablo González Fuertes

11 April 2021 30	Villarreal	1–2	Osasuna	Villarreal
14:00 CEST (UTC+2)	D. García 70' (o.g.)	Report	Moncayola 64'; Budimir 74'	Stadium: Estadio de la Cerámica; Attendance: 0 Referee: José Luis Munuera Montero

18 April 2021 33	Osasuna	2–0	Elche	Pamplona
14:00 CEST (UTC+2)	Barja 38'; Vidal (yellow card) 45'; Sánchez (yellow card) 48'; González 68' (o.g.)	Report	Boyé (yellow card) 8'	Stadium: El Sadar; Attendance: 0 Referee: Jorge Figueroa Vázquez
Note: The match was originally scheduled for 28 April 2021, but was brought forward by La Liga.

21 April 2021 31	Osasuna	3–1	Valencia	Pamplona
19:00 CEST (UTC+2)	Martínez 13'; Calleri 32'; Oier (yellow card) 47'; Torres (penalty missed) 65', 67' (pen.)	Report	Guedes (yellow card) 28'; Gameiro 30'; Diakhaby (yellow card) 66'	Stadium: El Sadar; Attendance: 0 Referee: Mario Melero López

25 April 2021 32	Celta Vigo	2–1	Osasuna	Vigo
18:30 CEST (UTC+2)	Aspas 42', (yellow card) 75'; Murillo 64'	Report	Cruz (yellow card) 25'; Brašanac (yellow card) 32'; Moncayola (yellow card) 36'; Torres 77' (pen.); Sánchez (yellow card) 88'	Stadium: Balaídos; Attendance: 0 Referee: César Soto Grado

1 May 2021 34	Real Madrid	2–0	Osasuna	Madrid
21:00 CEST (UTC+2)	Militão 76'; Casemiro 80'	Report	Martínez (yellow card) 55'; Oier (yellow card) 55'	Stadium: Alfredo Di Stéfano; Attendance: 0 Referee: Guillermo Cuadra Fernández

8 May 2021 35	Athletic Bilbao	2–2	Osasuna	Bilbao
21:00 CEST (UTC+2)	Morcillo 1'; Vencedor (yellow card) 50'; Sancet 62'	Report	Brašanac 12', (yellow card) 90+2'; Torró (yellow card) 26'; Budimir 89'	Stadium: San Mamés; Attendance: 0 Referee: Valentín Pizarro Gómez

11 May 2021 36	Osasuna	3–2	Cádiz	Pamplona
19:00 CEST (UTC+2)	Budimir 38', 75'; D. García (yellow card) 47'; Vidal (yellow card) 66'; Torres 86' (pen.)	Report	Espino (yellow card) 27'; Šaponjić 49' (pen.); Iza (yellow card) 86'; Perea 90+1'	Stadium: El Sadar; Attendance: 0 Referee: Santiago Jaime Latre

16 May 2021 37	Atlético Madrid	2–1	Osasuna	Madrid
18:30 CEST (UTC+2)	Lodi 82'; Suárez 88', (yellow card) 89'	Report	Budimir 76', (yellow card) 76'; Brašanac (yellow card) 84'	Stadium: Wanda Metropolitano; Attendance: 0 Referee: Juan Martínez Munuera

22 May 2021 38	Osasuna	0–1	Real Sociedad	Pamplona
18:00 CEST (UTC+2)	Gallego (yellow card) 19'	Report	Isak 86'	Stadium: El Sadar; Attendance: 0 Referee: Jorge Figueroa Vázquez

=== Copa del Rey ===
15 December 2020 First round	Tomares	0–6	Osasuna	Sevilla
19:00 CET (UTC+1)		Report	Barja 23', 83'; Roncaglia 30'; Gallego 49' (pen.); Saverio 69'; Calleri 89'	Stadium: La Cartuja; Referee: Valentín Pizarro Gómez

6 January 2021 Second round	Olot	0–3	Osasuna	Olot
19:00 CET (UTC+1)	Vivancos (yellow card) 16'	Report	Oier 2'; Martínez (yellow card) 15'; U. García (yellow card) 34'; Budimir 65'; Pérez (yellow card) 69'; Barja 90+1' (pen.); Navas (yellow card) 90+4'	Stadium: Municipal; Referee: José María Sánchez Martínez

17 January 2021 Round of 32	Espanyol	0–2	Osasuna	Cornellà de Llobregat
12:00 CET (UTC+1)	Gil (yellow card) 50'; De Tomás (yellow card) 84'	Report	Martínez 9', (yellow card) 51'; Barja 29'; Gallego (yellow card) 34'; Budimir (yellow card) 45+1'	Stadium: RCDE Stadium; Referee: Mario Melero López

27 January 2021 Round of 16	Almería	0–0 (a.e.t.) (5–4 p)	Osasuna	Almería
21:00 CET (UTC+1)	Fernandes (yellow card) 116'	Report	D. García (yellow card) 68'; Vidal (yellow card) 72'; Oier (yellow card) 119'	Stadium: Juegos Mediterráneos; Referee: Santiago Jaime Latre
	Penalties
	Akieme (penalty scored); Corpas (penalty missed); Sadiq (penalty scored); Ramazani (penalty scored); De la Hoz (penalty scored); Carvalho (penalty scored)		(penalty scored) Torres; (penalty scored) Moncayola; (penalty scored) Calleri; (penalty missed) Sánchez; (penalty scored) Barja; (penalty missed) D. García

== Statistics ==
=== Appearances and goals ===
Last updated on the end of the season.

No.	Pos	Nat	Player	Total		La Liga		Copa del Rey	
No.	Pos	Nat	Player	Apps	Goals	Apps	Goals	Apps	Goals
Goalkeepers
1	GK	(Spain) ESP	Sergio Herrera	33	0	32+1	0	0	0
13	GK	(Spain) ESP	Rubén	4	0	3	0	1	0
25	GK	(Spain) ESP	Juan Pérez	5	0	3	0	2	0
26	GK	(Spain) ESP	Iñaki Álvarez	1	0	0	0	1	0
Defenders
2	DF	(Spain) ESP	Nacho Vidal	37	0	25+9	0	1+2	0
3	DF	(Spain) ESP	Juan Cruz	28	0	23+3	0	1+1	0
4	DF	(Spain) ESP	Unai García	21	0	13+4	0	3+1	0
5	DF	(Spain) ESP	David García	36	1	35	1	1	0
6	DF	(Spain) ESP	Oier	35	1	24+8	0	1+2	1
12	DF	(Argentina) ARG	Facundo Roncaglia	21	2	14+3	1	4	1
15	DF	(Angola) ANG	Jonás Ramalho	5	0	3+2	0	0	0
23	DF	(Spain) ESP	Aridane	24	0	24	0	0	0
30	DF	(Spain) ESP	Gorka Zabarte	0	0	0	0	0	0
31	DF	(Spain) ESP	Jorge Herrando	1	0	0	0	0+1	0
39	DF	(Spain) ESP	Manu Sánchez	18	0	10+6	0	2	0
Midfielders
8	MF	(Serbia) SRB	Darko Brašanac	17	2	9+7	2	1	0
10	MF	(Spain) ESP	Roberto Torres	39	7	19+16	7	2+2	0
11	MF	(Spain) ESP	Kike Barja	37	6	17+16	2	3+1	4
14	MF	(Spain) ESP	Rubén García	39	3	33+4	3	1+1	0
21	MF	(Spain) ESP	Iñigo Pérez	25	0	16+6	0	1+2	0
24	MF	(Spain) ESP	Lucas Torró	27	0	17+8	0	1+1	0
27	MF	(Spain) ESP	Jon Moncayola	37	2	28+8	2	1	0
28	MF	(Spain) ESP	Javier Martínez	17	2	6+7	1	4	1
29	MF	(Spain) ESP	Aimar Oroz	2	0	0	0	0+2	0
Forwards
7	FW	(Spain) ESP	Jony Rodríguez	24	0	9+13	0	2	0
9	FW	(Argentina) ARG	Chimy Ávila	8	0	2+6	0	0	0
16	FW	(Argentina) ARG	Jonathan Calleri	27	6	20+5	5	0+2	1
17	FW	(Croatia) CRO	Ante Budimir	32	12	18+12	11	2	1
19	FW	(Spain) ESP	Enric Gallego	26	1	8+14	0	4	1
20	FW	(Spain) ESP	Adrián López	17	1	5+12	1	0	0
32	FW	(Spain) ESP	Asier Córdoba	1	0	0	0	0+1	0
Players who have made an appearance or had a squad number this season but have left the club
17	FW	(Spain) ESP	Marc Cardona	3	0	0+3	0	0	0
18	FW	(Spain) ESP	Brandon	2	0	0	0	1+1	0
22	DF	(Spain) ESP	Raúl Navas	5	0	2	0	3	0
37	FW	(Spain) ESP	Kike Saverio	2	1	0	0	1+1	1

=== Goalscorers ===
As of 31 December 2020

Rank	No.	Pos	Nat	Name	La Liga	Copa del Rey	Total
1	10	MF	(Spain)	Roberto Torres	4	0	4
2	14	MF	(Spain)	Rubén García	3	0	3
3	12	DF	(Argentina)	Facundo Roncaglia	1	1	2
3	11	MF	(Spain)	Kike Barja	0	2	2
3	16	FW	(Argentina)	Jonathan Calleri	1	1	2
3	17	FW	(Croatia)	Ante Budimir	2	0	2
7	5	DF	(Spain)	David García	1	0	1
7	8	MF	(Serbia)	Darko Brašanac	1	0	1
7	19	FW	(Spain)	Enric Gallego	0	1	1
7	20	FW	(Spain)	Adrián López	1	0	1
7	37	MF	(Spain)	Kike Saverio	0	1	1
Totals					14	6	20
