= Sjors-Lowis Hermsen =

Dutch footballer (born 2007)

Personal information
- Full name: Sjors-Lowis Hermsen
- Date of birth: 12 June 2007 (age 19)
- Place of birth: Sittard, Netherlands
- Height: 1.75 m (5 ft 9 in)
- Position: Centre-forward

Team information
- Current team: Fortuna Sittard
- Number: 27

Youth career
- 2017–2024: Fortuna Sittard

Senior career*
Years	Team	Apps	(Gls)
2024–	Fortuna Sittard	1	(0)
- * Club domestic league appearances and goals as of 9 September 2024

Sjors-Lowis Hermsen (born 12 June 2007) is a Dutch professional footballer who plays as a centre-forward for Eredivisie club Fortuna Sittard.

== Club career ==
Hermsen was recruited into the youth of Fortuna Sittard in 2017, play for the U18 and U21 teams prior to joining the first team. On 19 May, he made his senior debut for Fortuna Sittard against Heracles Almelo in the 2023–24 Eredivisie, aged 16, when he came on as a 91st-minute substitute for Iñigo Córdoba.

== Personal life ==
Born in the Netherlands, Hermsen is of Indonesian descent through his paternal grandmother
