= 2017–18 Athletic Bilbao season =

Athletic Bilbao
2017–18 season
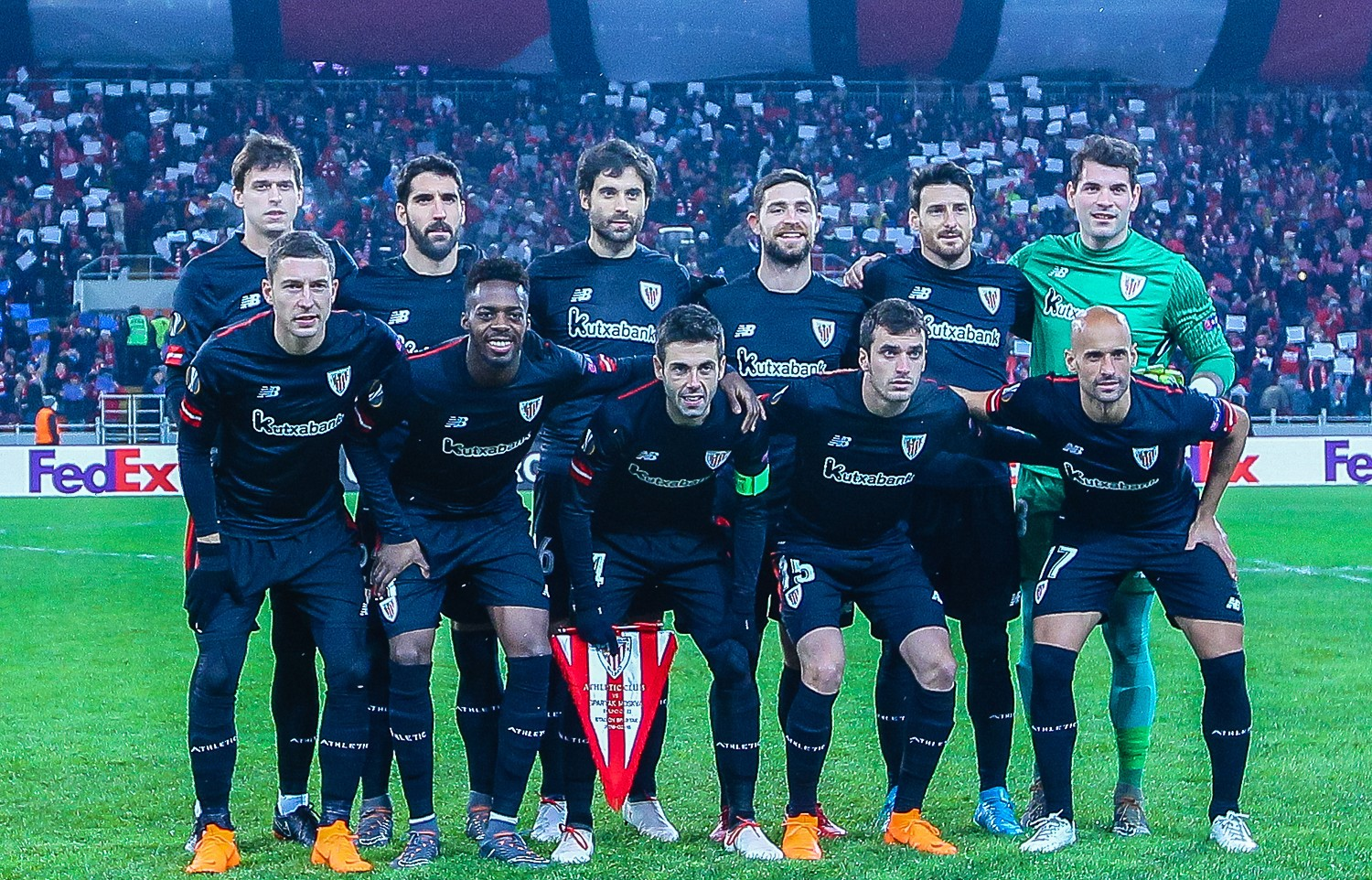
- Away game in Moskva
- President: Josu Urrutia
- Head coach: José Ángel Ziganda
- Stadium: San Mamés
- La Liga: 16th
- Copa del Rey: Round of 32
- UEFA Europa League: Round of 16
- Top goalscorer: League: Raúl García (10); All: Aritz Aduriz (20)
- Highest home attendance: 45,761 (vs Real Sociedad, 16 December 2017)
- Lowest home attendance: 14,294 (vs Formentera, 29 November 2017)
Home colours	Away colours	Third colours

The 2017–18 season was the 119th in Athletic Club’s history and the 87th in the top tier.

== Squad ==
According to the official website. Unai Núñez wore number 12 in domestic matches from the beginning of 2018.

=== Player statistics ===
S	P	N	Name	League				Cup				Europe				Total			
S	P	N	Name	A	S	G	M	A	S	G	M	A	S	G	M	A	S	G	M
1	GK	(Spain)	Kepa Arrizabalaga	30	0	0	2700	1	0	0	90	0	0	0	0	31	0	0	2790
3	DF	(Spain)	Enric Saborit	16	3	0	1429	2	0	0	180	2	0	0	155	20	3	0	1764
4	DF	(Spain)	Iñigo Martínez	16	0	0	1440	0	0	0	0	0	0	0	0	16	0	0	1440
5	DF	(Spain)	Yeray Álvarez	7	1	0	675	0	0	0	0	4	0	0	314	11	1	0	989
6	MF	(Spain)	Mikel San José	24	2	1	2156	1	0	0	90	7	4	0	649	32	6	1	2895
7	MF	(Spain)	Beñat Etxebarria	12	12	0	1115	1	0	0	90	7	1	0	571	20	13	0	1776
8	MF	(Spain)	Ander Iturraspe (vc)	20	10	0	1903	0	1	0	16	5	2	0	529	25	13	0	2448
9	FW	(Spain)	Kike Sola	0	0	0	0	1	0	0	62	0	0	0	0	1	0	0	62
10	MF	(Spain)	Iker Muniain (3rd c)	7	7	4	775	0	0	0	0	6	0	1	523	13	7	5	1298
11	FW	(Spain)	Iñaki Williams	31	7	7	2851	1	0	0	90	9	4	3	863	41	11	10	3804
13	GK	(Spain)	Iago Herrerín	8	0	0	720	1	0	0	90	14	0	0	1260	23	0	0	2070
14	FW	(Spain)	Markel Susaeta (c)	26	8	3	2268	1	0	0	90	8	5	0	772	35	13	3	3130
15	DF	(Spain)	Iñigo Lekue	22	10	0	2104	2	0	0	180	10	2	0	911	34	12	0	3195
16	DF	(Spain)	Xabier Etxeita	5	0	1	377	2	0	0	180	12	0	1	1046	19	0	2	1603
17	MF	(Spain)	Mikel Rico	13	4	0	1170	0	0	0	0	5	3	0 (Note: He is credited with a goal against Spartak Moskva by some sources.)	389	18	7	0	1559
18	DF	(Spain)	Óscar de Marcos	20	1	1	1663	0	0	0	0	7	0	1	630	27	1	2	2293
19	FW	(Spain)	Sabin Merino	5	8	0	371	2	0	0	155	0	3	0	9	7	11	0	535
20	FW	(Spain)	Aritz Aduriz	21	12	9	2149	0	1	0	25	13	1	11	1159	34	14	20	3333
21	MF	(Spain)	Mikel Vesga	11	1	1	807	2	0	0	164	5	2	0	460	18	3	1	1431
22	MF	(Spain)	Raúl García	30	4	10	2637	0	2	1	37	10	2	3	889	40	8	14	3563
24	DF	(Spain)	Mikel Balenziaga	18	0	0	1554	0	0	0	0	10	0	0	835	28	0	0	2389
28	FW	(Spain)	Iñigo Córdoba	18	12	1	1457	1	0	0	90	6	4	0	552	25	16	1	2099
29	DF	(Spain)	Óscar Gil	0	0	0	0	1	0	0	90	0	0	0	0	1	0	0	90
30	DF	(Spain)	Unai Núñez	33	0	1	2942	0	0	0	0	2	1	0	225	34	1	1	3167
34	DF	(Spain)	Andoni López	1	0	0	90	0	0	0	0	0	0	0	0	1	0	0	90
40	MF	(Spain)	Iñigo Muñoz	0	0	0	0	0	1	0	16	0	0	0	0	0	1	0	16
Players left the club or on loan in winter transfer window
2	DF	(Spain)	Eneko Bóveda	6	0	0	523	0	0	0	0	1	1	0	134	7	1	0	657
4	DF	(France)	Aymeric Laporte	19	0	0	1710	1	0	0	90	10	0	1	900	30	0	1	2700
23	MF	(Spain)	Ager Aketxe	0	3	0	34	2	0	0	155	1	6	0	74	3	9	0	263

=== Disciplinary record ===
Iñigo Martínez' and Iñaki Williams' yellow cards against Celta Vigo on matchday 30 were removed in April 2018.

S	P	N	Name	League			Cup			Europe			Total		
S	P	N	Name	Yellow card	Yellow-red card	Red card	Yellow card	Yellow-red card	Red card	Yellow card	Yellow-red card	Red card	Yellow card	Yellow-red card	Red card
1	GK	(Spain)	Kepa Arrizabalaga	3	0	0	0	0	0	0	0	0	3	0	0
3	DF	(Spain)	Enric Saborit	5	0	0	0	0	0	0	0	0	5	0	0
4	DF	(Spain)	Iñigo Martínez	5	0	0	0	0	0	0	0	0	5	0	0
5	DF	(Spain)	Yeray Álvarez	2	0	0	0	0	0	0	0	0	2	0	0
6	MF	(Spain)	Mikel San José	5	0	0	0	0	0	4	0	0	9	0	0
7	MF	(Spain)	Beñat Etxebarria	3	0	0	0	0	0	1	0	0	4	0	0
8	MF	(Spain)	Ander Iturraspe	7	0	0	0	0	0	0	0	0	7	0	0
9	FW	(Spain)	Kike Sola	0	0	0	0	0	0	0	0	0	0	0	0
10	MF	(Spain)	Iker Muniain	1	0	0	0	0	0	1	0	0	2	0	0
11	FW	(Spain)	Iñaki Williams	2	0	0	0	0	0	1	0	0	3	0	0
13	GK	(Spain)	Iago Herrerín	0	0	0	0	0	0	0	0	0	0	0	0
14	FW	(Spain)	Markel Susaeta	2	0	0	0	0	0	2	0	0	4	0	0
15	DF	(Spain)	Iñigo Lekue	3	0	0	0	0	0	2	0	0	5	0	0
16	DF	(Spain)	Xabier Etxeita	2	0	0	1	0	0	2	0	0	5	0	0
17	MF	(Spain)	Mikel Rico	2	0	0	0	0	0	0	0	0	2	0	0
18	DF	(Spain)	Óscar de Marcos	5	0	0	0	0	0	0	0	0	5	0	0
19	FW	(Spain)	Sabin Merino	1	0	0	0	0	0	0	0	0	1	0	0
20	FW	(Spain)	Aritz Aduriz	5	0	0	0	0	0	1	1	0	6	1	0
21	MF	(Spain)	Mikel Vesga	6	0	0	0	0	0	1	0	0	7	0	0
22	MF	(Spain)	Raúl García	10	0	0	0	0	0	3	0	0	13	0	0
24	DF	(Spain)	Mikel Balenziaga	1	0	0	0	0	0	1	0	0	2	0	0
28	FW	(Spain)	Iñigo Córdoba	3	0	0	0	0	0	1	0	0	4	0	0
29	DF	(Spain)	Óscar Gil	0	0	0	0	0	0	0	0	0	0	0	0
30	DF	(Spain)	Unai Núñez	11	0	0	0	0	0	1	1	0	12	1	0
34	DF	(Spain)	Andoni López	0	0	0	0	0	0	0	0	0	0	0	0
40	MF	(Spain)	Iñigo Muñoz	0	0	0	0	0	0	0	0	0	0	0	0
Players left the club or on loan in winter transfer window
2	DF	(Spain)	Eneko Bóveda	1	0	0	0	0	0	0	0	0	1	0	0
4	DF	(France)	Aymeric Laporte	5	0	0	0	0	0	1	0	0	6	0	0
23	MF	(Spain)	Ager Aketxe	1	0	0	0	0	0	0	0	0	1	0	0

=== From the youth system ===
Note: Flags indicate national team as defined under FIFA eligibility rules; some limited exceptions apply. Players may hold more than one non-FIFA nationality.

No.	Pos.	Nation	Player
28	MF	ESP	Iñigo Córdoba
30	DF	ESP	Unai Núñez
34	DF	ESP	Andoni López
40	MF	ESP	Iñigo Muñoz

=== Transfer ===
In

Date	Name	Moving from	Fee
30 June 2017	(Spain) Ager Aketxe	(Spain) Cádiz	Loan return
30 June 2017	(Spain) Óscar Gil	(Spain) Oviedo	Loan return
30 June 2017	(Spain) Iago Herrerín	(Spain) Leganés	Loan return
30 June 2017	(Spain) Kike Sola	(Spain) Numancia	Loan return
30 June 2017	(Spain) Mikel Vesga	(Spain) Sporting Gijón	Loan return
30 January 2018	(Spain) Iñigo Martínez	(Spain) Real Sociedad	€32M

Out

Date	Name	Moving to	Fee
14 June 2017	(Spain) Gorka Iraizoz	(Spain) Girona	Free
30 June 2017	(Spain) Gorka Elustondo	(Colombia) Atlético Nacional	Free
24 July 2017	(Spain) Javier Eraso	(Spain) Leganés	Free
20 January 2018	(Spain) Eneko Bóveda	(Spain) Deportivo La Coruña	Free
30 January 2018	(France) Aymeric Laporte	(England) Manchester City	€65M
16 February 2018	(Spain) Ager Aketxe	(Canada) Toronto	Free

== Staff ==
According to the official website.

Position	Name
Head coach	José Ángel Ziganda
Assistant coach	Bingen Arostegi
Technical coach	Alberto Iglesias
Physical coach	Iban Urkiza
Recuperative coach	Xabier Clemente
Goalkeeper coach	Imanol Etxeberria
Representative	Andoni Imaz
Doctors	Josean Lekue, Paco Angulo
Masseur	Juan Manuel Ipiña
Physiotherapists	Beñat Azula, Isusko Ortuzar, Álvaro Campa
Regenerative therapist	Imanol Martín
Podiatrist	Sergio Bilbao
Material managers	Txetxu Gallego, Jon Eskalza, Iker López

== Pre-season and friendlies ==
12 July 2017 Friendly	Basel	3–2	Athletic Bilbao	Lens, Switzerland
19:00 CEST (UTC+02:00)	Delgado 30' (pen.); Van Wolfswinkel 60'; Pululu 89'	Report	Sabin 40'; Sola 49'	Stadium: Christ-Roi; Referee: Sascha Amhof

15 July 2017 Friendly	Sion	0–2	Athletic Bilbao	Lens, Switzerland
19:00 CEST (UTC+02:00)		Report	Zverotić 38' (o.g.); García 52'	Stadium: Christ-Roi; Referee: Lionel Tschudi

17 July 2017 Friendly	Athletic Bilbao	0–0	Fenerbahçe	Yverdon-les-Bains, Switzerland
20:00 CEST (UTC+02:00)		Report		Stadium: Municipal; Referee: Adrien Jaccottet

21 July 2017 Friendly	Club Brugge	0–2	Athletic Bilbao	Bruges, Belgium
19:00 CEST (UTC+02:00)		Report	García 41', 59' (pen.)	Stadium: Jan Breydel; Referee: Nicolas Laforge

22 July 2017 Friendly	Athletic Bilbao	1–2	Valladolid	Sestao, Spain
19:00 CEST (UTC+02:00)	Córdoba 4'	Report	Arnaiz 35'; Nacho 56'	Stadium: Las Llanas; Referee: Xabier Gómez

29 July 2017 Friendly	Athletic Bilbao	3–0	Reus	Leioa, Spain
19:00 CEST (UTC+02:00)	San José 35'; Aketxe 52' (pen.); Williams 68'	Report		Stadium: Sarriena; Referee: Jon González

5 August 2017 Friendly	Liverpool	3–1	Athletic Bilbao	Dublin, Republic of Ireland
17:15 WEST (UTC+01:00)	Firmino 20' (pen.); Woodburn 58'; Solanke 79'	Report	Williams 29'	Stadium: Aviva; Referee: Paul McLaughlin

12 August 2017 Euskal Herriko Futbol Txapelketa	Athletic Bilbao	2–2	Alavés	Barakaldo, Spain
19:30 CEST (UTC+02:00)	Vesga 42'; Aduriz 56'	Report	Ibai 52'; Santos 86' (pen.)	Stadium: Lasesarre; Referee: Daniel Palencia

11 October 2017 Friendly	Barakaldo	2–2	Athletic Bilbao	Barakaldo, Spain
20:15 CEST (UTC+02:00)	Arroyo 51' (pen.); Bilbao 90' (o.g.)	Report	Sabin 15'; Beñat 29'	Stadium: Lasesarre; Referee: Jon González

22 January 2018 Friendly	Athletic Bilbao	0–0	Rudeš	Lezama, Spain
11:30 CET (UTC+01:00)		Report		Stadium: Lezama; Referee: Ricardo de Burgos

23 May 2018 Friendly	Santutxu	0–4	Athletic Bilbao	Basauri, Spain
19:00 CEST (UTC+02:00)		Report	Sabin 11', 54', 77'; Aduriz 45'	Stadium: Artunduaga; Referee: Igor Guijarro

== Competitions ==
=== Overview ===
Competition	First match	Last match	Starting round	Final position	Record							
Competition	First match	Last match	Starting round	Final position	Pld	W	D	L	GF	GA	GD	Win %
La Liga	20 August 2017	20 May 2018	Matchday 1	16th	38	10	13	15	41	49	−8	26.32
Europa League	27 July 2017	15 March 2018	Third qualifying round	Round of 16	14	7	3	4	22	16	+6	50.00
Copa del Rey	25 October 2017	29 November 2017	Round of 32	Round of 32	2	0	1	1	1	2	−1	0.00
Total					54	17	17	20	64	67	−3	31.48

Source: Competitions

=== La Liga ===
League table

Pos	Team	Pld	W	D	L	GF	GA	GD	Pts	Qualification or relegation
14	Alavés	38	15	2	21	40	50	−10	47	
15	Levante	38	11	13	14	44	58	−14	46	
16	Athletic Bilbao	38	10	13	15	41	49	−8	43 (Note: Athletic Bilbao finished ahead of Leganés on head-to-head goal difference: Athletic Bilbao 2–0 Leganés, Leganés 1–0 Athletic Bilbao.)	
17	Leganés	38	12	7	19	34	51	−17	43	
18	Deportivo La Coruña (R)	38	6	11	21	38	76	−38	29	Relegation to Segunda División

Source: La Liga, Soccerway
Rules for classification: 1) Points; 2) Head-to-head points; 3) Head-to-head goal difference; 4) Goal difference; 5) Goals scored; 6) Fair-play points (Note: Head-to-head record is used only after all the matches between the teams in question have been played)
(R) Relegated

==== Results summary ====
Overall								Home						Away					
Pld	W	D	L	GF	GA	GD	Pts	W	D	L	GF	GA	GD	W	D	L	GF	GA	GD
38	10	13	15	41	49	−8	43	6	8	5	19	16	+3	4	5	10	22	33	−11

Round by round

Round	1	2	3	4	5	6	7	8	9	10	11	12	13	14	15	16	17	18	19	20	21	22	23	24	25	26	27	28	29	30	31	32	33	34	35	36	37	38
Ground	H	A	H	A	H	A	A	H	A	H	A	H	A	H	A	H	A	H	A	A	H	A	H	A	H	H	A	H	A	H	A	H	A	H	A	H	A	H
Result	D	W	W	L	L	D	L	W	L	L	L	D	D	D	W	D	W	W	D	D	D	L	D	L	W	D	L	W	L	D	W	L	D	L	L	W	L	L
Position	12	10	4	6	10	11	13	11	11	15	15	15	16	16	14	14	12	8	12	12	12	13	13	14	12	12	14	12	13	12	12	13	13	14	14	14	16	16

==== Matches ====
20 August 2017 1	Athletic Bilbao	0–0	Getafe	Bilbao
18:15 CEST (UTC+02:00)	Núñez (yellow card) 68'	Report	Bergara (yellow card) 18'; Álvaro (yellow card) 41' (yellow-red card) 66'; Suárez (yellow card) 59'; Molinero (yellow card) 63'	Stadium: San Mamés; Attendance: 38,110; Referee: Mario Melero (Andalusia)

27 August 2017 2	Eibar	0–1	Athletic Bilbao	Eibar
18:15 CEST (UTC+02:00)	Kike (yellow card) 25'; Jordán (yellow card) 49' (yellow-red card) 90+1'	Report	Aduriz 38'; Bóveda (yellow card) 81'	Stadium: Ipurua; Attendance: 5,948; Referee: José Sánchez (Murcia)

10 September 2017 3	Athletic Bilbao	2–0	Girona	Bilbao
16:15 CEST (UTC+02:00)	Beñat (yellow card) 21'; Muniain 25'; Aduriz 53'; García (yellow card) 64'; San José (yellow card) 68'; Laporte (yellow card) 90'	Report	Alcalá (yellow card) 24'; Granell (yellow card) 27'; Bernardo (yellow card) 40'; Aday (yellow card) 56'; Douglas Luiz (yellow card) 80'; Stuani (yellow card) 87'	Stadium: San Mamés; Attendance: 39,952; Referee: Daniel Trujillo (Canary Islands)

17 September 2017 4	Las Palmas	1–0	Athletic Bilbao	Las Palmas
17:30 WEST (UTC+01:00)	Calleri (yellow card) 58'; Tannane (yellow card) 63'; Rémy 87'	Report	Laporte (yellow card) 60'; Aduriz (yellow card) 64'; Vesga (yellow card) 77'	Stadium: Gran Canaria; Attendance: 19,149; Referee: Pablo González (Asturia)

20 September 2017 5	Athletic Bilbao	1–2	Atlético Madrid	Bilbao
20:00 CEST (UTC+02:00)	García 90+2'	Report	Thomas (yellow card) 25'; Filipe Luís (yellow card) 39'; Correa 55'; Carrasco 73'	Stadium: San Mamés; Attendance: 43,499; Referee: Xavier Estrada (Catalonia)

23 September 2017 6	Málaga	3–3	Athletic Bilbao	Málaga
18:30 CEST (UTC+02:00)	Hernández (yellow card) 3'; Rolán 35', 84'; Borja (yellow card) 49'; Ricca (yellow card) 51'; Kuzmanović (yellow card) 52' (yellow-red card) 52'; Recio (yellow card) 53'; Rosales (yellow card) 60'; Baysse 81'	Report	Aduriz 4' (pen.); Williams 51', 70'; Laporte (yellow card) 53'; Aketxe (yellow card) 89'	Stadium: La Rosaleda; Attendance: 23,425; Referee: Carlos del Cerro (Madrid)

1 October 2017 7	Valencia	3–2	Athletic Bilbao	Valencia
18:30 CEST (UTC+02:00)	Gayà (yellow card) 18'; Zaza 27' (yellow card) 84'; Parejo 34' (pen.) (yellow card) 84'; Rodrigo 66'	Report	Arrizabalaga (yellow card) 33'; Núñez (yellow card) 50'; Aduriz 59'; García (yellow card) 63' (goal) 76'; Vesga (yellow card) 80'	Stadium: Mestalla; Attendance: 42,070; Referee: Alejandro Hernández (Canary Islands)

14 October 2017 8	Athletic Bilbao	1–0	Sevilla	Bilbao
13:00 CEST (UTC+02:00)	Aduriz (yellow card) 13'; Córdoba (yellow card) 33'; Núñez (yellow card) 37'; Vesga 43' (yellow card) 85'; Laporte (yellow card) 90+8'	Report	Lenglet (yellow card) 53'; Correa (yellow card) 68'; Vázquez (yellow card) 79'; Pizarro (yellow card) 90+5'; Muriel (yellow card) 90+8'	Stadium: San Mamés; Attendance: 40,197; Referee: Ignacio Iglesias (Galicia)

22 October 2017 9	Leganés	1–0	Athletic Bilbao	Leganés
18:30 CEST (UTC+02:00)	Pérez (yellow card) 11'; Eraso (yellow card) 45'; Beauvue 54'; Siovas (yellow card) 82'	Report	Vesga (yellow card) 31'; San José (yellow card) 43'; Iturraspe (yellow card) 64'; Núñez (yellow card) 79'	Stadium: Butarque; Attendance: 10,509; Referee: Antonio Mateu (Valencia)

28 October 2017 10	Athletic Bilbao	0–2	Barcelona	Bilbao
20:45 CEST (UTC+02:00)	Iturraspe (yellow card) 41'	Report	Messi 36'; Busquets (yellow card) 47'; Piqué (yellow card) 63'; Paulinho (yellow card) 75' (goal) 90+2'; Umtiti (yellow card) 81'	Stadium: San Mamés; Attendance: 43,579; Referee: Juan Martínez Munuera (Valencia)

5 November 2017 11	Celta Vigo	3–1	Athletic Bilbao	Vigo
16:15 CET (UTC+01:00)	S. Gómez 16' (yellow card) 41'; Aspas 22', 26'; M. Gómez (yellow card) 64'	Report	Vesga (yellow card) 12'; García 38'; Balenziaga (yellow card) 58'; Aduriz (yellow card) 90+1'	Stadium: Balaídos; Attendance: 19,876; Referee: Jesús Gil (Extremadura)

19 November 2017 12	Athletic Bilbao	1–1	Villarreal	Bilbao
20:45 CET (UTC+01:00)	Iturraspe (yellow card) 19'; Aduriz 77'	Report	Bonera (yellow card) 5'; Trigueros 28'; Costa (yellow card) 34'; Ruiz (yellow card) 63'	Stadium: San Mamés; Attendance: 36,728; Referee: David Medié (Catalonia)

26 November 2017 13	Deportivo La Coruña	2–2	Athletic Bilbao	A Coruña
12:00 CET (UTC+01:00)	Adrián 35'; Mosquera (yellow card) 39'; Cartabia (yellow card) 44'; Expósito (yellow card) 68'; Schär 76'; Albentosa (yellow card) 87'	Report	Susaeta 16'; Williams 60'; Laporte (yellow card) 71'	Stadium: Abanca-Riazor; Attendance: 20,879; Referee: José González (Castile and Léon)

2 December 2017 14	Athletic Bilbao	0–0	Real Madrid	Bilbao
20:45 CET (UTC+01:00)	De Marcos (yellow card) 45'; Etxeita (yellow card) 57'	Report	Ramos (yellow card) 11' (yellow-red card) 86'; Casemiro (yellow card) 73'; Carvajal (yellow card) 90+1'; Ronaldo (yellow card) 90+3'	Stadium: San Mamés; Attendance: 44,992; Referee: Antonio Mateu (Valencia)

10 December 2017 15	Levante	1–2	Athletic Bilbao	Valencia
18:30 CET (UTC+01:00)	Toño (yellow card) 4'; Laporte 73' (o.g.); Campaña (yellow card) 79'; Chema (yellow card) 79'	Report	Aduriz 5' (pen.); García (yellow card) 40'; Rico (yellow card) 69'; Vesga (yellow card) 76'; Postigo 79' (o.g.)	Stadium: Ciutat de València; Attendance: 18,005; Referee: Xavier Estrada (Catalonia)

16 December 2017 16	Athletic Bilbao	0–0	Real Sociedad	Bilbao
16:15 CET (UTC+01:00)	Aduriz (yellow card) 56'; Lekue (yellow card) 74'; Rico (yellow card) 88'	Report		Stadium: San Mamés; Attendance: 45,761; Referee: David Fernández (Andalusia)

22 December 2017 17	Real Betis	0–2	Athletic Bilbao	Seville
19:30 CET (UTC+01:00)	Amat (red card) 34'; Joaquín (yellow card) 78'	Report	Núñez (yellow card) 15'; Saborit (yellow card) 17'; García 36' (pen.); Feddal 85' (o.g.)	Stadium: Benito Villamarín; Attendance: 42,819; Referee: Juan Martínez Munuera (Valencia)

7 January 2018 18	Athletic Bilbao	2–0	Alavés	Bilbao
18:30 CET (UTC+01:00)	Etxeita 8' (yellow card) 79'; Susaeta (yellow card) 53'; Aduriz 64' (pen.)	Report	Pedraza (yellow card) 12'; Aguirregabiria (yellow card) 24'; Alexis (yellow card) 62'; Munir (yellow card) 64'	Stadium: San Mamés; Attendance: 41,070; Referee: Pablo González (Asturia)

14 January 2018 19	Espanyol	1–1	Athletic Bilbao	Cornellà de Llobregat
18:30 CET (UTC+01:00)	Gerard 29'; Hermoso (yellow card) 60'; Martín (yellow card) 78'	Report	Williams 35'; Iturraspe (yellow card) 68'; Saborit (yellow card) 76'; García (yellow card) 80'; Sabin (yellow card) 88'	Stadium: RCDE; Attendance: 19,827; Referee: Daniel Trujillo (Canary Islands)

19 January 2018 20	Getafe	2–2	Athletic Bilbao	Getafe
21:00 CET (UTC+01:00)	Molina 21' (yellow card) 67'; Amath (yellow card) 29'; Molinero (yellow card) 47'; Ángel 74'; Djené (yellow card) 79'; Arambarri (yellow card) 90+2'	Report	Williams 13'; Núñez (yellow card) 44'; García 48' (pen.)	Stadium: Coliseum Alfonso Pérez; Attendance: 11,103; Referee: Jesús Gil (Extremadura)

26 January 2018 21	Athletic Bilbao	1–1	Eibar	Bilbao
21:00 CET (UTC+01:00)	Aduriz 50'	Report	Kike 73'	Stadium: San Mamés; Attendance: 39,440; Referee: Mario Melero (Andalusia)

4 February 2018 22	Girona	2–0	Athletic Bilbao	Girona
18:30 CET (UTC+01:00)	Stuani 7' (pen.), 65'; Maffeo (yellow card) 46'	Report	Núñez (yellow card) 58'	Stadium: Montilivi; Attendance: 9,362; Referee: José Luis Munuera Montero (Andalusia)

9 February 2018 23	Athletic Bilbao	0–0	Las Palmas	Bilbao
21:00 CET (UTC+01:00)	Aduriz (yellow card) 12'; Saborit (yellow card) 51'; Arrizabalaga (yellow card) 52'; García (yellow card) 77'	Report	Navarro (yellow card) 12'; Calleri (yellow card) 41'; Michel (yellow card) 59'; Chichizola (yellow card) 79'	Stadium: San Mamés; Attendance: 33,839; Referee: Xavier Estrada (Catalonia)

18 February 2018 24	Atlético Madrid	2–0	Athletic Bilbao	Madrid
16:15 CET (UTC+01:00)	Correa (yellow card) 17'; Costa (yellow card) 36' (goal) 80'; Filipe Luís (yellow card) 62'; Gameiro 67'	Report	Beñat (yellow card) 40'; Núñez (yellow card) 71'	Stadium: Wanda Metropolitano; Attendance: 59,699; Referee: José González (Castile and Léon)

25 February 2018 25	Athletic Bilbao	2–1	Málaga	Bilbao
16:15 CET (UTC+01:00)	Martínez (yellow card) 15'; Susaeta 17'; San José 44'; Lekue (yellow card) 60'; De Marcos (yellow card) 63'	Report	En-Nesyri 13' (yellow card) 65' (yellow-red card) 84'; González (yellow card) 24'	Stadium: San Mamés; Attendance: 37,734; Referee: Alejandro Hernández (Canary Islands)

28 February 2018 26	Athletic Bilbao	1–1	Valencia	Bilbao
19:30 CET (UTC+01:00)	Córdoba (yellow card) 29'; De Marcos 49'	Report	Zaza (yellow card) 20'; Kondogbia 23'; Murillo (yellow card) 69'	Stadium: San Mamés; Attendance: 34,382; Referee: Jesús Gil (Extremadura)

3 March 2018 27	Sevilla	2–0	Athletic Bilbao	Seville
16:15 CET (UTC+01:00)	Muriel 27'; Vázquez 32'; Nolito (yellow card) 75'; Correa (yellow card) 83'	Report	Saborit (yellow card) 64'; San José (yellow card) 79'; Martínez (yellow card) 83'	Stadium: Ramón Sánchez Pizjuán; Attendance: 25,185; Referee: Alberto Undiano (Navarre)

11 March 2018 28	Athletic Bilbao	2–0	Leganés	Bilbao
20:45 CET (UTC+01:00)	García 10', 17' (yellow card) 68'; Córdoba (yellow card) 28'	Report	El Zhar (yellow card) 12'; Zaldúa (yellow card) 36'; Brašanac (yellow card) 66'; Siovas (yellow card) 72'; Bustinza (yellow card) 89'	Stadium: San Mamés; Attendance: 30,896; Referee: José Sánchez (Murcia)

18 March 2018 29	Barcelona	2–0	Athletic Bilbao	Barcelona
16:15 CET (UTC+01:00)	Alcácer 8'; Umtiti (yellow card) 17'; Messi 30'; Dembélé (yellow card) 39'	Report	García (yellow card) 31'; Lekue (yellow card) 40'	Stadium: Camp Nou; Attendance: 82,312; Referee: Santiago Jaime (Aragon)

31 March 2018 30	Athletic Bilbao	1–1	Celta Vigo	Bilbao
16:15 CEST (UTC+02:00)	Williams (yellow card) 31'; Martínez (yellow card) 44'; Núñez 55' (yellow card) 90+2'	Report	M. Gómez (yellow card) 15'; Méndez 90+1'	Stadium: San Mamés; Attendance: 33,881; Referee: Carlos del Cerro (Madrid)

9 April 2018 31	Villarreal	1–3	Athletic Bilbao	Villarreal
21:00 CEST (UTC+02:00)	Bonera (yellow card) 38'; Bacca (yellow card) 45' (goal) 67'; Álvaro (yellow card) 64' (yellow-red card) 89'; Asenjo (yellow card) 87'	Report	Córdoba 4'; Martínez (yellow card) 41'; Núñez (yellow card) 45'; Williams 51'; Iturraspe (yellow card) 67'; Arrizabalaga (yellow card) 74'; De Marcos (yellow card) 81'; Muniain 87'	Stadium: La Cerámica; Attendance: 14,869; Referee: Ignacio Iglesias (Galicia)

14 April 2018 32	Athletic Bilbao	2–3	Deportivo La Coruña	Bilbao
20:45 CEST (UTC+02:00)	García 47' (yellow card) 61'; Susaeta 72'; Yeray (yellow card) 90+2'	Report	Adrián 6', 14'; Valle 53'; Rubén (yellow card) 79'	Stadium: San Mamés; Attendance: 37,976; Referee: José González (Castile and Léon)

18 April 2018 33	Real Madrid	1–1	Athletic Bilbao	Madrid
21:30 CEST (UTC+02:00)	Vázquez (yellow card) 45'; Ronaldo 87'; Carvajal (yellow card) 90+2'	Report	Williams 14' (yellow card) 39'; Iturraspe (yellow card) 61'; De Marcos (yellow card) 84'; San José (yellow card) 89'	Stadium: Santiago Bernabéu; Attendance: 59,293; Referee: Juan Martínez Munuera (Valencia)

23 April 2018 34	Athletic Bilbao	1–3	Levante	Bilbao
21:00 CEST (UTC+02:00)	García 8' (yellow card) 53'; Iturraspe (yellow card) 41'; Núñez (yellow card) 88'	Report	Bardhi 42', 44' (yellow card) 45'; Lerma (yellow card) 55'; Jason (yellow card) 89'; Morales 90'	Stadium: San Mamés; Attendance: 24,749; Referee: José Luis Munuera Montero (Andalusia)

28 April 2018 35	Real Sociedad	3–1	Athletic Bilbao	San Sebastián
16:15 CEST (UTC+02:00)	San José 15', 54' (o.g.); Illarramendi (yellow card) 26'; Oyarzabal 36'; Llorente (yellow card) 59'; Pardo (red card) 85'; Willian José (yellow card) 86'	Report	García (yellow card) 13' (goal) 59' (pen.); De Marcos (yellow card) 24'; Williams (yellow card) 81'; Susaeta (yellow card) 84'; Muniain (yellow card) 86'; Martínez (yellow card) 90+4'	Stadium: Anoeta; Attendance: 23,878; Referee: José Sánchez (Murcia)

5 May 2018 36	Athletic Bilbao	2–0	Real Betis	Bilbao
16:15 CEST (UTC+02:00)	Muniain 76'; Aduriz 90+2'	Report	Bartra (yellow card) 28'; García (yellow card) 90+2'	Stadium: San Mamés; Attendance: 34,491; Referee: Javier Alberola (Castile-La Mancha)

12 May 2018 37	Alavés	3–1	Athletic Bilbao	Vitoria-Gasteiz
18:30 CEST (UTC+02:00)	Maripán (yellow card) 32'; Munir (yellow card) 35' (goal) 60'; Guidetti 43'; Ibai 77'	Report	Beñat (yellow card) 27'; Saborit (yellow card) 34'; Yeray (yellow card) 58'; San José (yellow card) 73'; Muniain 79'; Martínez (yellow card) 90+3'	Stadium: Mendizorrotza; Attendance: 16,199; Referee: Xavier Estrada (Catalonia)

20 May 2018 38	Athletic Bilbao	0–1	Espanyol	Bilbao
16:15 CEST (UTC+02:00)		Report	Da. López 9'; J. López (yellow card) 81'	Stadium: San Mamés; Attendance: 28,492; Referee: David Fernández (Andalusia)

=== Copa del Rey ===
Round of 32

25 October 2017 First leg	Formentera	1–1	Athletic Bilbao	Sant Francesc Xavier
19:00 CEST (UTC+02:00)	Samuel (yellow card) 51'; Liñán 60'; Tejera (yellow card) 76'; Gabri (yellow card) 81'; Romero (yellow card) 90+1'	Report	Etxeita (yellow card) 56'; García 63'	Stadium: Municipal; Attendance: 2,376; Referee: Pablo González (Asturia)

29 November 2017 Second leg	Athletic Bilbao	0–1 (1–2 agg.)	Formentera	Bilbao
21:30 CET (UTC+01:00)		Report	Gonzalez (yellow card) 90+2'; Muñiz 90+6'	Stadium: San Mamés; Attendance: 14,294; Referee: Carlos del Cerro (Madrid)

=== UEFA Europa League ===
==== Qualifying phase ====
Third qualifying round

27 July 2017 First leg	Dinamo București (Romania)	1–1	(Spain) Athletic Bilbao	Bucharest, Romania
20:30 EEST (UTC+03:00)	Nascimento (yellow card) 34'; Romera (yellow card) 49'; Rivaldinho 54' (yellow card) 55'; Hanca (yellow card) 61'; Nedelcearu (yellow card) 90+3'	Report	Laporte 21'; Muniain (yellow card) 30'	Stadium: Arena Națională; Attendance: 26,783; Referee: Tore Hansen (Norway)

3 August 2017 Second leg	Athletic Bilbao (Spain)	3–0 (4–1 agg.)	(Romania) Dinamo București	Bilbao, Spain
20:45 CEST (UTC+02:00)	García 24', 29'; Aduriz 86'	Report	Katsikas (yellow card) 36'; Costache (yellow card) 63'; Albín (yellow card) 88'	Stadium: San Mamés; Attendance: 41,845; Referee: Pavle Radovanović (Montenegro)

Play-off round

17 August 2017 First leg	Panathinaikos (Greece)	2–3	(Spain) Athletic Bilbao	Athens, Greece
20:30 CEST (UTC+02:00)	Lod 29'; Kourbelis (yellow card) 45'; Cabezas 55'	Report	García (yellow card) 22'; Etxeita (yellow card) 32'; Aduriz 68', 74' (pen.); De Marcos 71'; San José (yellow card) 88'	Stadium: Leoforos Alexandras Stadium; Attendance: 15,000; Referee: Jorge Sousa (Portugal)

24 August 2017 Second leg	Athletic Bilbao (Spain)	1–0 (4–2 agg.)	(Greece) Panathinaikos	Bilbao, Spain
20:45 CEST (UTC+02:00)	Muniain 22'; Lekue (yellow card) 76'	Report	Johansson (yellow card) 28'; Luciano (yellow card) 34'	Stadium: San Mamés; Attendance: 42,747; Referee: Benoît Bastien (France)

==== Group stage ====
Pos	Team	Pld	W	D	L	GF	GA	GD	Pts	Qualification
1	(Spain) Athletic Bilbao	6	3	2	1	8	5	+3	11 (Note: Head-to-head results: Östersund 2–2 Athletic Bilbao, Athletic Bilbao 1–0 Östersund.)	Advance to knockout phase
2	(Sweden) Östersunds FK	6	3	2	1	8	4	+4	11	Advance to knockout phase
3	(Ukraine) Zorya Luhansk	6	2	0	4	3	9	−6	6	
4	(Germany) Hertha BSC	6	1	2	3	6	7	−1	5	

Source: UEFA
Rules for classification: Group stage tiebreakers
Notes:

14 September 2017 1	Hertha BSC (Germany)	0–0	(Spain) Athletic Bilbao	Berlin, Germany
21:05 CEST (UTC+02:00)	Weiser (yellow card) 26'; Ibišević (yellow card) 60'	Report	Vesga (yellow card) 43'; San José (yellow card) 62'	Stadium: Olympiastadion; Attendance: 28,832; Referee: Ivan Kružliak (Slovakia)

28 September 2017 2	Athletic Bilbao (Spain)	0–1	(Ukraine) Zorya Luhansk	Bilbao, Spain
19:00 CEST (UTC+02:00)		Report	Kharatin 26'; Opanasenko (yellow card) 58'; Hordiyenko (yellow card) 68'; Andriyevskyi (yellow card) 81'	Stadium: San Mamés; Attendance: 32,462; Referee: Halis Özkahya (Turkey)

19 October 2017 3	Östersund (Sweden)	2–2	(Spain) Athletic Bilbao	Östersund, Sweden
19:00 CEST (UTC+02:00)	Mukiibi (yellow card) 6'; Gero 52' (yellow card) 72'; Sema (yellow card) 55'; Edwards 64'	Report	Aduriz 14'; Córdoba (yellow card) 24'; Williams 89'	Stadium: Jämtkraft Arena; Attendance: 7,870; Referee: István Kovács (Romania)

2 November 2017 4	Athletic Bilbao (Spain)	1–0	(Sweden) Östersund	Bilbao, Spain
21:05 CET (UTC+01:00)	Lekue (yellow card) 16'; Balenziaga (yellow card) 64'; Núñez (yellow card) 67' (yellow-red card) 89'; Aduriz 70'; Susaeta (yellow card) 84'	Report	Mukiibi (yellow card) 81'	Stadium: San Mamés; Attendance: 32,354; Referee: Paweł Gil (Poland)

23 November 2017 5	Athletic Bilbao (Spain)	3–2	(Germany) Hertha BSC	Bilbao, Spain
19:00 CET (UTC+01:00)	Aduriz 35' (pen.), 66' (pen.); Laporte (yellow card) 81'; Williams 82'; García (yellow card) 86'	Report	Leckie 26'; Langkamp (yellow card) 34'; Selke 36' (yellow card) 67'	Stadium: San Mamés; Attendance: 38,928; Referee: Paolo Tagliavento (Italy)

7 December 2017 6	Zorya Luhansk (Ukraine)	0–2	(Spain) Athletic Bilbao	Lviv, Ukraine
22:05 EET (UTC+02:00)	Lunyov (yellow card) 43'; Andriyevskyi (yellow card) 50'; Kabayev (yellow card) 82'	Report	Núñez (yellow card) 16'; Aduriz 70'; García 86'	Stadium: Arena Lviv; Attendance: 8,428; Referee: Ruddy Buquet (France)

==== Knockout phase ====
Round of 32

15 February 2018 First leg	Spartak Moscow (Russia)	1–3	(Spain) Athletic Bilbao	Moscow, Russia
21:00 MSK (UTC+03:00)	Kutepov (yellow card) 37'; Zobnin (yellow card) 55'; Luiz Adriano 60' (yellow card) 67'	Report	García (yellow card) 15'; Aduriz 22', 39'; Kutepov 45+1' (o.g.); Etxeita (yellow card) 56'	Stadium: Otkritie Arena; Attendance: 43,145; Referee: Benoît Bastien (France)

22 February 2018 Second leg	Athletic Bilbao (Spain)	1–2 (4–3 agg.)	(Russia) Spartak Moscow	Bilbao, Spain
21:05 CET (UTC+01:00)	Etxeita 57'; San José (yellow card) 86'; Aduriz (yellow card) 90+3'	Report	Bocchetti (yellow card) 31'; Luiz Adriano 44'; Yeshchenko (yellow card) 67'; Glushakov (yellow card) 80'; Melgarejo 85'; Kombarov (yellow card) 90+4'	Stadium: San Mamés; Attendance: 36,873; Referee: Tobias Stieler (Germany)

Round of 16

8 March 2018 First leg	Marseille (France)	3–1	(Spain) Athletic Bilbao	Marseille, France
21:05 CET (UTC+01:00)	Ocampos 1', 58'; Payet 14' (yellow card) 45+4'; Germain (yellow card) 38'; Rami (yellow card) 45+1'	Report	Aduriz 45+3' (pen.); San José (yellow card) 56'; Susaeta (yellow card) 60'; Beñat (yellow card) 82'	Stadium: Vélodrome; Attendance: 37,657; Referee: Jorge Sousa (Portugal)

15 March 2018 Second leg	Athletic Bilbao (Spain)	1–2 (2–5 agg.)	(France) Marseille	Bilbao, Spain
19:00 CET (UTC+01:00)	Aduriz (yellow card) 15' (yellow-red card) 76'; Williams (yellow card) 61' (goal) 74'	Report	Payet 38' (pen.); Rami (yellow card) 48'; Ocampos 52'	Stadium: San Mamés; Attendance: 40,580; Referee: Anthony Taylor (England)

== See also ==
- Athletic Bilbao in European football
