= Aitor Córdoba =

Spanish footballer (born 1995)

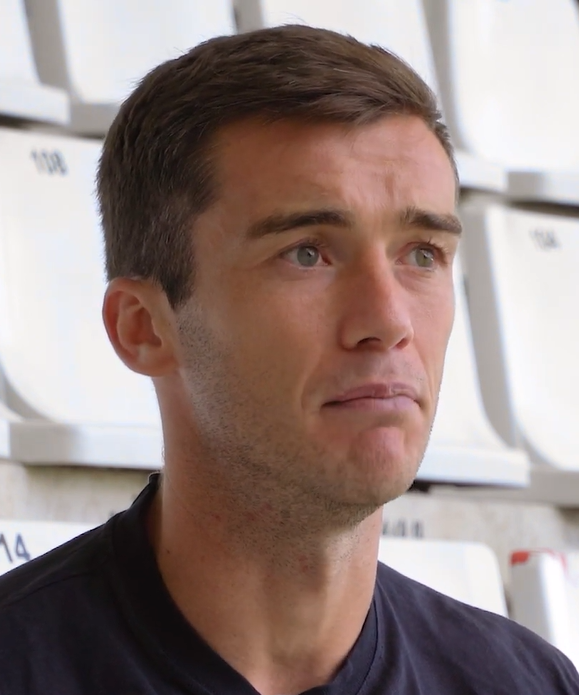
- Córdoba in 2023

Personal information
- Full name: Aitor Córdoba Querejeta
- Date of birth: 21 May 1995 (age 31)
- Place of birth: Bilbao, Spain
- Height: 1.91 m (6 ft 3 in)
- Position: Centre-back

Team information
- Current team: Tianjin Jinmen Tiger
- Number: 18

Youth career
- Leioa

Senior career*
Years	Team	Apps	(Gls)
2013–2018	Leioa	190	(3)
2018–2026	Burgos	218	(3)
2026–	Tianjin Jinmen Tiger	25	(2)
- * Club domestic league appearances and goals as of 8 November 2026

Aitor Córdoba Querejeta (born 21 May 1995) is a Spanish footballer who plays as a centre-back for Tianjin Jinmen Tiger.

== Club career ==
Born in Bilbao, Biscay, Basque Country, Córdoba was a SD Leioa youth graduate. He made his first team debut in the 2012–13 season, in Tercera División, and featured sparingly in the following campaign, as the club achieved promotion to Segunda División B.

From 2014 onwards, Córdoba established himself as a regular starter for Leioa, being the team captain as the club remained in the third level. On 30 June 2019, he agreed to a deal with fellow third division side Burgos CF.

A regular starter in his first season, Córdoba was mainly a backup option in his second, as his club returned to Segunda División after 19 years. He made his professional debut on 15 August 2021, starting in a 0–1 away draw against Sporting de Gijón.

Córdoba scored his first professional goal on 4 February 2022, netting Burgos' third in a 3–1 home win over AD Alcorcón. A regular starter in the following seasons, he renewed his contract until 2026 on 10 June 2024.

On 25 January 2026, after losing his starting spot during the campaign, Córdoba terminated his link with the Blanquinegros. On 26 February 2026, Córdoba joined Chinese Super League club Tianjin Jinmen Tiger.

== Personal life ==
Córdoba has two younger brothers who are also footballers. Iñigo and Asier, both wingers, were Athletic Bilbao youth graduates. Their sister Ainhoa (born 30 November 2001) plays for Leioa's women's team in the Basque regional league.

== Career statistics ==
As of match played 8 November 2026

Appearances and goals by club, season and competition
Club	Season	League			Cup		Other		Total	
Club	Season	Division	Apps	Goals	Apps	Goals	Apps	Goals	Apps	Goals
Leioa	2013–14	Tercera División	21	0	—		—		21	0
Leioa	2014–15	Segunda División B	32	0	3	0	—		35	0
Leioa	2015–16	Segunda División B	34	1	—		2	0	36	1
Leioa	2016–17	Segunda División B	33	0	—		—		33	0
Leioa	2017–18	Segunda División B	34	0	2	0	—		36	0
Leioa	2018–19	Segunda División B	36	2	—		—		36	2
Leioa	Total		190	3	5	0	2	0	197	3
Burgos	2019–20	Segunda División B	26	0	0	0	—		38	0
Burgos	2020–21	Segunda División B	11	0	2	0	2	0	15	0
Burgos	2021–22	Segunda División	38	2	0	0	—		38	2
Burgos	2022–23	Segunda División	41	0	2	0	—		43	0
Burgos	2023–24	Segunda División	41	0	3	0	—		44	0
Burgos	2024–25	Segunda División	41	1	2	0	—		43	1
Burgos	2025–26	Segunda División	20	0	2	0	—		22	0
Burgos	Total		218	3	11	0	2	0	231	3
Tianjin Jinmen Tiger	2026	Chinese Super League	25	2	0	0	—		25	2
Career total			433	8	16	0	4	0	453	8
