= Unai Arieta =

Spanish footballer

Personal information
- Full name: Unai Arietaleanizbeaskoa Miota
- Date of birth: 16 June 1999 (age 27)
- Place of birth: Bergara, Spain
- Height: 1.85 m (6 ft 1 in)
- Position: Forward

Team information
- Current team: Cultural Durango

Youth career
- Bergara
- Eibar

Senior career*
| Years | Team | Apps | (Gls) |
| 2019–2022 | Vitoria | 75 | (20) |
| 2020–2022 | Eibar | 4 | (0) |
| 2022–2023 | Barakaldo | 26 | (7) |
| 2023– | Cultural Durango | 39 | (13) |
- * Club domestic league appearances and goals as of 12 October 2024

Unai Arietaleanizbeaskoa Miota (born 16 June 1999), sometimes known as Unai Arieta, is a Spanish professional footballer who plays as a forward for Cultural Durango.

== Club career ==
Born in Bergara, Gipuzkoa, Basque Country, Arieta joined SD Eibar's youth setup from Bergara KE. In July 2019, he was promoted to the reserves in Tercera División.

Arieta made his senior debut on 24 August 2019, starting in a 0–0 away draw against Gernika Club. He scored his first senior goal on 18 September, netting the equalizer in a 2–1 away defeat of CD Basconia, and finished the campaign with eight goals in 27 appearances overall, as his side narrowly missed out promotion in the play-offs.

Arieta made his first team – and La Liga – debut on 30 September 2020, coming on as a second-half substitute for Kike in a 0–1 home loss against Elche CF.
