= Miguel Marí =

Spanish footballer

Personal information
- Full name: Miguel Marí Sánchez
- Date of birth: 30 June 1997 (age 29)
- Place of birth: Alicante, Spain
- Height: 1.85 m (6 ft 1 in)
- Position: Midfielder

Team information
- Current team: UD Logroñés
- Number: 8

Youth career
- Hércules
- Valencia
- 2015–2016: Inter Milan
- 2016: Valladolid

Senior career*
Years	Team	Apps	(Gls)
2016–2018	Valladolid B	68	(3)
2018–2020	Vitoria	47	(10)
2019–2021	Eibar	3	(0)
2020–2021	→ Orihuela (loan)	24	(4)
2021–2023	Intercity	55	(3)
2023–2024	Eldense	3	(0)
2024	→ Hércules (loan)	12	(0)
2024–2025	Teruel	32	(1)
2025–	UD Logroñés	31	(3)
- * Club domestic league appearances and goals as of 7 May 2026

Miguel Marí Sánchez (born 30 June 1997) is a Spanish footballer who plays as a midfielder for Segunda Federación club UD Logroñés.

== Club career ==
Born in Alicante, Valencian Community, Marí represented Hércules CF and Valencia CF before joining Inter Milan's Primavera squad in 2015, playing as a forward. In January of the following year, however, he returned to Spain and joined Real Valladolid's youth setup.

Marí was promoted to Valladolid's B-team in June 2016, and made his senior debut on 28 August by playing the last 14 minutes of a 1–2 Segunda División B home loss against CD Boiro. He scored his first senior goal on 27 November, netting his team's third in a 3–1 away win against CD Tudelano.

On 2 July 2018, free agent Marí signed for SD Eibar, being initially assigned to farm team CD Vitoria, also in the third division. He made his first team – and La Liga – –debut the following 23 April, coming on as a first-half substitute for injured Pape Diop in a 0–2 loss at SD Huesca.

On 6 September 2020, Marí moved to Orihuela CF in the third division on loan for the 2020–21 season. On 5 July 2021, he signed a contract with Segunda División RFEF side CF Intercity, and achieved promotion to Primera Federación at the end of the campaign.

On 13 July 2023, Marí signed a two-year deal with CD Eldense, newly-promoted to Segunda División. On 23 August of the following year, after a loan spell at Hércules CF in Segunda Federación, he joined CD Teruel also in division four.

== Personal life ==
Marí's father, José Miguel, was also a footballer. A goalkeeper, he represented Hércules in the 1990s. His younger brother Alberto is also a professional footballer.
