= Unai Dufur =

Spanish footballer

Personal information
- Full name: Unai Dufur Espelosín
- Date of birth: 21 February 1999 (age 27)
- Place of birth: Pamplona, Spain
- Height: 1.87 m (6 ft 2 in)
- Position: Centre back

Team information
- Current team: Barakaldo
- Number: 4

Youth career
- CP San Francisco
- San Juan
- 2017–2018: Eibar

Senior career*
Years	Team	Apps	(Gls)
2017–2019	Eibar Urko	22	(1)
2019–2021	Vitoria	36	(0)
2020–2021	Eibar	1	(0)
2021–2023	Osasuna B	58	(3)
2021	Osasuna	1	(0)
2023–2025	Gimnàstic	44	(1)
2025–	Barakaldo	32	(1)
- * Club domestic league appearances and goals as of 9 June 2026

Unai Dufur Espelosín (born 21 February 1999) is a Spanish footballer who plays as a central defender for Barakaldo.

== Club career ==
Born in Pamplona, Dufur played for CP San Francisco, AD San Juan and SD Eibar as a youth. After making his senior debut with the second reserve team SD Eibar Urko in the 2017–18 season, he was promoted to the farm team in Tercera División in July 2019.

Dufur made his first team debut with the Armeros on 17 December 2020, starting in a 2–0 away win over Racing Rioja CF, for the season's Copa del Rey. His La Liga debut occurred the following 18 April, as he started in a 0–5 away loss against Atlético Madrid.

On 4 June 2021, Dufur signed a two-year contract with CA Osasuna, being initially assigned to the reserves in Segunda División RFEF. He helped the B-side in their promotion to Primera Federación in his first season, scoring twice in 27 appearances.

On 14 June 2023, Dufur signed a two-year contract with fellow third division side Gimnàstic de Tarragona. On 8 July 2025, he moved to Barakaldo CF in the same category.

== Personal life ==
Dufur's younger brother Ander is also a footballer. A right back, both played together at San Juan.
