= Iñigo Córdoba =

Spanish footballer (born 1997)

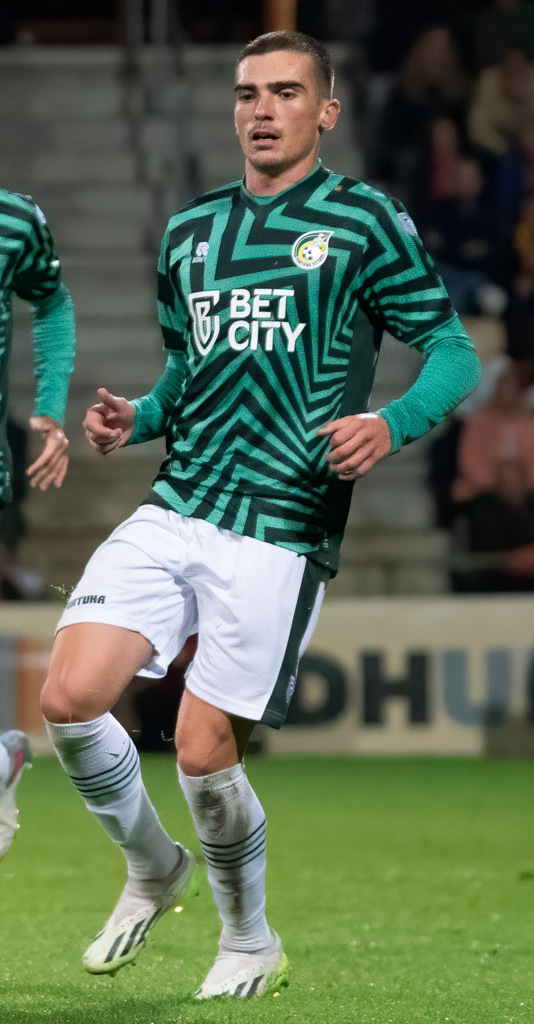
- Córdoba in 2023

Personal information
- Full name: Iñigo Córdoba Querejeta
- Date of birth: 13 March 1997 (age 29)
- Place of birth: Bilbao, Spain
- Height: 1.78 m (5 ft 10 in)
- Position: Winger

Team information
- Current team: Castellón
- Number: 14

Youth career
- Askartza Claret
- 2009–2014: Athletic Bilbao

Senior career*
Years	Team	Apps	(Gls)
2014–2015	Basconia	34	(4)
2015–2017	Bilbao Athletic	53	(4)
2017–2022	Athletic Bilbao	80	(2)
2021	→ Alavés (loan)	7	(0)
2021–2022	→ Go Ahead Eagles (loan)	30	(9)
2022–2024	Fortuna Sittard	64	(9)
2024–2026	Burgos	72	(5)
2026–	Castellón	9	(0)

International career
2013	Spain U17	2	(0)
2015–2016	Spain U19	2	(0)
2017–2018	Spain U21	2	(1)
- * Club domestic league appearances and goals as of 17 October 2026

Iñigo Córdoba Querejeta (Basque: [iɲiɣo koɾðoβa]; Spanish: [ˈiɲiɣo ˈkoɾðoβa]; born 13 March 1997) is a Spanish professional footballer who plays as a left winger for CD Castellón.

== Club career ==
=== Athletic Bilbao ===
Born in Bilbao, Biscay, Basque Country, Córdoba joined Athletic Bilbao's youth setup in 2009, aged 12. He made his debuts as a senior with the farm team in the 2014–15 campaign, in Tercera División.

In summer 2015, Córdoba spent the whole pre-season with the reserves, newly promoted to Segunda División. On 12 September of that year he made his professional debut aged 18, coming on as a late substitute for Aitor Seguín in a 0–1 away loss against Real Valladolid; he started seven of his 21 appearances in the second tier, and remained with the B-team after their relegation at the end of the season.

After a year as a regular starter in the third level, Córdoba signed a new contract until 2021, and was invited to train with the senior side in the 2017 pre-season. He made his first team – and La Liga – debut on 20 August, replacing Mikel Balenziaga in a 0–0 home draw against Getafe CF. He scored his first goal in a domestic league fixture away to Villarreal CF on 9 April 2018, the opener in a 3–1 victory for his team. Before the end of the season he signed an extension to his contract, including a buyout clause of upwards of €30 million, running until June 2022.

==== Loans ====
On 1 February 2021, Córdoba joined Deportivo Alavés on loan for the remainder of the 2020–21 season. On 31 August, he moved abroad for the first time in his career, after agreeing to a one-year loan deal with Dutch Eredivisie side Go Ahead Eagles.

=== Fortuna Sittard ===
Upon returning to Athletic, Córdoba terminated his contract with the club on 7 July 2022. On 22 July, he returned to the Netherlands and signed a two-year deal with Fortuna Sittard. He made his competitive debut for the club on the first matchday of the season, on 6 August 2022, replacing Doğan Erdoğan in the 66th minute of a 3–2 home loss to Ajax. On 22 October 2022, he scored his first goal for Fortuna, opening the score in a 1–1 league draw against Feyenoord. He scored a brace on 2 April 2023, helping his side to a 3–1 victory against Groningen. His contract was not extended at the end of the 2023–24 season, making him a free agent.

=== Burgos ===
On 27 July 2024, Córdoba signed a two-year contract with Burgos CF in the second division. On 25 June 2026, the club announced his departure.

=== Castellón ===
On 4 July 2026, free agent Córdoba agreed to a two-year deal with CD Castellón still in division two.

== International career ==
Having initially been called up to the Spain under-21 squad by coach Albert Celades in October 2017, the following month Córdoba made his debut at that level, coming on as a half-time substitute for Mikel Oyarzabal and scoring within eight minutes of his introduction in an eventual 5–1 victory over Slovakia on 14 November 2017, in a qualifier for the 2019 UEFA European Under-21 Championship.

== Personal life ==
Córdoba has two brothers who are also footballers. His older sibling Aitor (born 1995) is a central defender who graduated from the youth setup at SD Leioa and played in the second division with Burgos CF. Asier, the youngest of the three (born 2000) is also a winger, and was also groomed at Athletic Bilbao. Their sister Ainhoa (born 2001) plays for Leioa's women's team in the Basque regional league.

== Career statistics ==
=== Club ===
As of match played 23 April 2023

Appearances and goals by club, season and competition
Club	Season	League			National Cup		Continental		Total	
Club	Season	League	Apps	Goals	Apps	Goals	Apps	Goals	Apps	Goals
Basconia	2014–15	Tercera División	34	4	—		—		34	4
Bilbao Athletic	2015–16	Segunda División	21	0	—		—		21	0
Bilbao Athletic	2016–17	Segunda División B	32	4	—		—		32	4
Bilbao Athletic	Total		53	4	—		—		53	4
Athletic Bilbao	2017–18	La Liga	30	1	1	0	10 (Note: Appearance(s) in UEFA Europa League)	0	41	1
Athletic Bilbao	2018–19	La Liga	23	0	3	0	—		26	0
Athletic Bilbao	2019–20	La Liga	24	1	2	0	—		26	1
Athletic Bilbao	2020–21	La Liga	3	0	0	0	—		3	0
Athletic Bilbao	Total		80	2	6	0	10	0	96	2
Alavés (loan)	2020–21	La Liga	7	0	—		—		7	0
Go Ahead Eagles (loan)	2021–22	Eredivisie	30	9	5	3	—		35	12
Fortuna Sittard	2022–23	Eredivisie	27	5	1	0	—		28	5
Career total			231	24	12	3	10	0	253	27
