= Eñaut Mendia =

Spanish footballer

Mendi
Personal information
- Full name: Eñaut Mendia Berasategui
- Date of birth: 25 June 1999 (age 27)
- Place of birth: Lazkao, Spain
- Height: 1.85 m (6 ft 1 in)
- Position: Forward

Team information
- Current team: Beasain

Youth career
- Beasain

Senior career*
Years	Team	Apps	(Gls)
2017–2019	Beasain	40	(7)
2019–2022	Vitoria	83	(9)
2020–2021	Eibar	1	(0)
2022–2023	Portugalete	25	(1)
2023–2024	Lagun Onak	27	(1)
2024–	Beasain	6	(0)
- * Club domestic league appearances and goals as of 12 October 2024

Eñaut Mendia Berasategui (born 25 June 1999), sometimes known as Eñaut Mendi or just Mendi, is a Spanish professional footballer who plays as a forward for Beasain.

== Club career ==
Born in Lazkao, Gipuzkoa, Basque Country, Mendi was a SD Beasain youth graduate. He made his first team debut during the 2017–18 season, in Tercera División.

In July 2019, Mendi moved to SD Eibar on a three-year contract, and was assigned to the reserves in Tercera División. He made his first team – and La Liga – debut on 3 October 2020, starting in a 2–1 away win against Real Valladolid.
