= Atxabalpe Facilities =

Football ground in Spain

- Interactive map of Atxabalpe Facilities
- Location: Arrasate-Mondragón; Basque Country
- Coordinates: 43°04′00″N 02°31′37″W
- Owner: Arrasate-Mondragón Municipal Council
- Type: Football training facility

Tenant
- SD Eibar (training) (2014-)

Atxabalpe is a football ground in Arrasate-Mondragón, Basque Country, Spain. Since the 2014–15 season, it has been the training ground of the Primera División club SD Eibar.

== Overview ==
The ground was the home venue of the local football team Mondragón CF. However, it became abandoned in 2007 when the team moved to its new artificial-turf ground known as Polideportivo Musakola Complejo.

Following SD Eibar's promotion to Primera División, the club signed an agreement with the Arrasate-Mondragón Municipal Council, owners of Atxabalpe, for the exclusive use of the facilities as the club's new training ground.

The facilities were refurbished by SD Eibar. It is the first natural turf training ground used by the club throughout their history.

== Facilities ==
- The main ground known as Campo Futbol Atxabalpe with a seating capacity of 1,000 spectators.
- Full-size second natural grass training pitch (inaugurated 2015).
- Service centre with gymnasium.
