= Asier Córdoba =

Spanish footballer

Personal information
- Full name: Asier Córdoba Querejeta
- Date of birth: 31 March 2000 (age 26)
- Place of birth: Bilbao, Spain
- Height: 1.84 m (6 ft 0 in)
- Position: Winger

Team information
- Current team: Miedź Legnica
- Number: 18

Youth career
- 2009–2010: Askartza Claret
- 2010–2018: Athletic Bilbao

Senior career*
Years	Team	Apps	(Gls)
2018–2019	Basconia	1	(0)
2018–2020	Bilbao Athletic	29	(2)
2020–2021	Osasuna B	21	(7)
2020	Osasuna	0	(0)
2021–2022	Alcorcón	10	(0)
2022	SD Logroñés	12	(1)
2022–2023	Den Bosch	13	(1)
2023	SD Logroñés	20	(2)
2023–2024	Real Unión	32	(2)
2024–2025	Sestao River	35	(4)
2025–	Miedź Legnica	32	(9)

International career
2016	Spain U17	2	(1)
- * Club domestic league appearances and goals as of 14:58, 29 May 2026 (UTC)

Asier Córdoba Querejeta (born 31 March 2000) is a Spanish professional footballer who plays as a winger for Polish club Miedź Legnica.

== Club career ==
=== Athletic Bilbao ===
Córdoba was born in Bilbao, Biscay, Basque Country, and joined Athletic Bilbao's youth setup in 2010, from Askartza Claret CF. Initially promoted to the farm team ahead of the 2018–19 season, he started to play for the reserves in Segunda División B, and made his senior debut with the latter club on 29 September 2018 by starting in a 1–2 away loss against Real Oviedo Vetusta.

Córdoba scored his first senior goal 5 May 2019, netting the opener in a 3–0 away win against CD Calahorra. On 29 June 2020, he was released by the club as his contract was due to expire in the following day.

=== Osasuna ===
On 3 July 2020, Córdoba agreed to a three-year deal with CA Osasuna, initially assigned to the B-team in the third division. He made his debut for the B-side on 15 November, starting in a 0–1 away loss against SD Tarazona.

Córdoba made his first team debut on 15 December 2020, coming on as a half-time substitute for Juan Cruz in a 6–0 away routing of UD Tomares, for the season's Copa del Rey. The following 9 July, he terminated his contract with the club.

=== Alcorcón ===
On 9 July 2021, Córdoba signed for AD Alcorcón in Segunda División. He made his professional debut on 21 August, replacing Juan Hernández in a 0–2 home loss against CF Fuenlabrada.

On 31 January 2022, Córdoba left Alkor after terminating his contract.

=== Logroñés ===
On 31 January 2022, just hours after leaving Alcorcón, Córdoba joined Primera División RFEF side SD Logroñés.

=== Den Bosch ===
On 24 June 2022, Córdoba moved to a foreign club for the first time in his career, signing a two-year contract with Dutch second-tier Eerste Divisie club Den Bosch.

=== Return to Logroñés ===
On 8 January 2023, Córdoba returned to SD Logroñés.

=== Sestao River ===
On 18 July 2024, Córdoba signed with Sestao River in the third tier.

=== Miedź Legnica ===
On 19 June 2025, Córdoba moved to Polish second tier club Miedź Legnica on a two-year deal, with a one-year extension option.

== Personal life ==
Córdoba has two brothers who are also footballers. His elder sibling Aitor (born 1995) is a central defender who graduated from the youth setup at SD Leioa and played in the second division with Burgos CF. His middle brother Iñigo is also a winger, and was also groomed at Athletic Bilbao. Their sister Ainhoa (born 2001) plays for Leoia's women's team in the Basque regional league.
