= Kike García (Spanish footballer) =

Spanish footballer (born 1989)

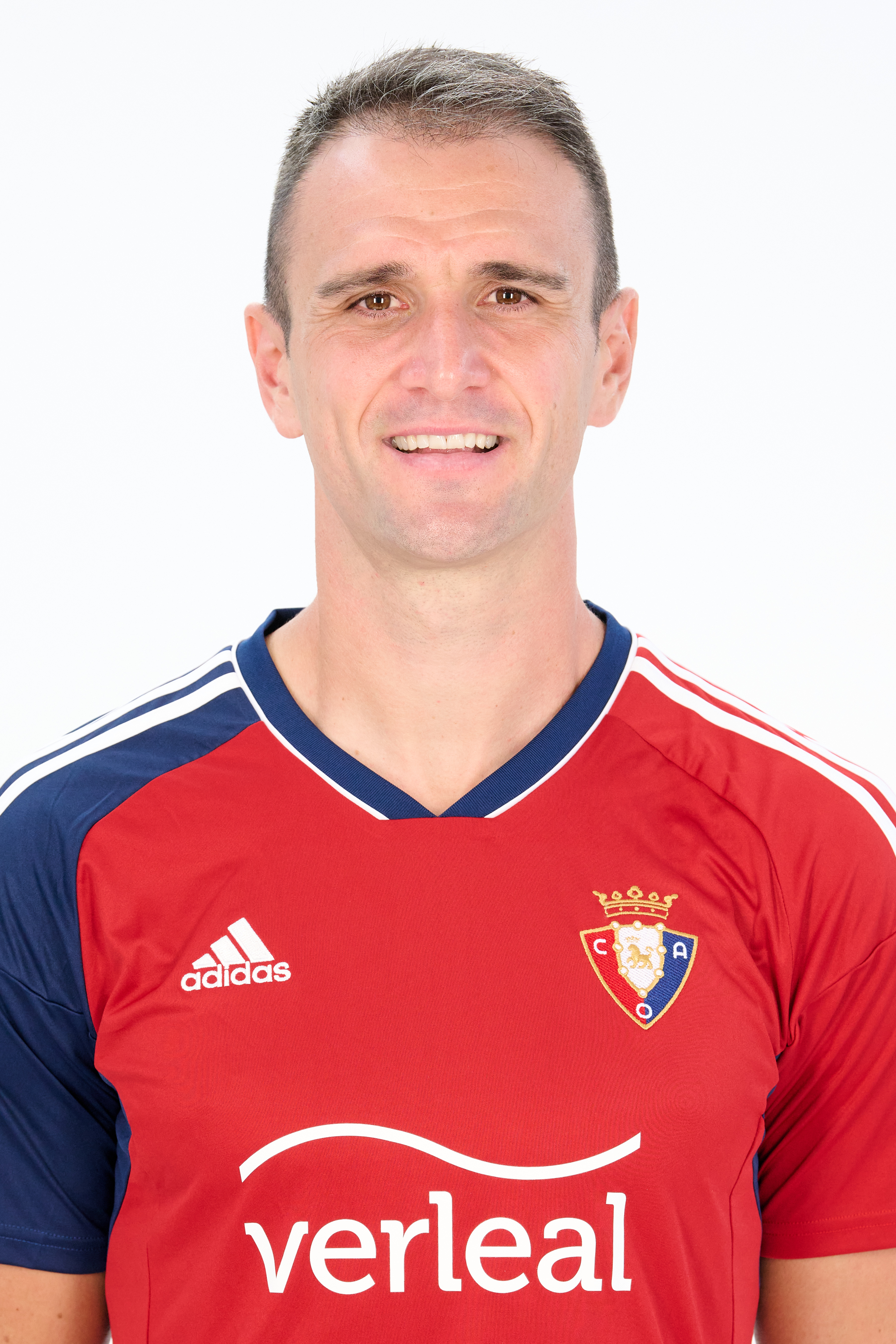
- García with Osasuna in 2022

Personal information
- Full name: Enrique García Martínez
- Date of birth: 25 November 1989 (age 36)
- Place of birth: Motilla del Palancar, Spain
- Height: 1.86 m (6 ft 1 in)
- Position: Striker

Team information
- Current team: Espanyol
- Number: 19

Youth career
- 2004–2007: Quintanar Rey
- 2007–2008: Murcia

Senior career*
Years	Team	Apps	(Gls)
2008–2009	Murcia B	34	(8)
2009–2014	Murcia	144	(47)
2014–2016	Middlesbrough	61	(13)
2016–2021	Eibar	153	(35)
2021–2023	Osasuna	68	(7)
2023–2025	Alavés	68	(16)
2025–	Espanyol	37	(8)

International career
2009	Spain U20	7	(3)
- * Club domestic league appearances and goals as of 14:15, 27 May 2026 (UTC)

Enrique "Kike" García Martínez (Spanish pronunciation: [enˈrike ɣaɾˈθi.a maɾˈtineθ]; (Note: In isolation, García is pronounced [ɡaɾˈθi.a].) born 25 November 1989), sometimes known as just Kike ([ˈkike]), is a Spanish professional footballer who plays as a striker for La Liga club Espanyol.

He began his career at Real Murcia, competing in five Segunda División seasons before a €3.5 million transfer to Middlesbrough in 2014. After one and a half seasons in the English Championship, he returned to Spain with Eibar.

García played for Spain at under-20 level.

== Club career ==
=== Murcia ===
Born in Motilla del Palancar, Cuenca, García joined Real Murcia CF's academy aged 18, after a brief spell with local CD Quintanar del Rey. He made his senior debut with the former's reserves in the 2007–08 season, in the Tercera División.

On 23 May 2009, García played his first match as a professional, coming on as a substitute for Quique de Lucas in a 2–2 away draw against RC Celta de Vigo in the Segunda División. He scored his first goal roughly a month later, the first in a 2–1 home victory over UD Salamanca. In November he signed a new three-year contract, being definitely promoted to the main squad.

García suffered an injury to his fibula in September 2011 and, despite being initially sidelined for a month, he was out of action for the entire campaign. In October of the following year, he signed a new deal with Murcia running until 2016.

In his final year with the Pimentoneros, 2013–14, García was the joint second top scorer in the league with 23 goals and helped his team to the La Liga promotion play-offs, only to be relegated administratively. He was also May's Player of the Month.

=== Middlesbrough ===
On 11 July 2014, García joined English Championship side Middlesbrough, in a €3.5 million (£2.7 million) deal; he was signed by compatriot Aitor Karanka, who had worked with him at international youth level. He made his competitive debut on 9 August by starting at home to Birmingham City on the opening day of the season, scoring his team's second goal in the 66th minute for a 2–0 home win. He found the net again in his second appearance three days later, replacing Adam Reach early into the second half of a Football League Cup tie at Oldham Athletic and closing the 3–0 victory.

García came on for Jelle Vossen in the 86th minute of the FA Cup fourth round match at reigning Premier League champions Manchester City on 24 January 2015, and scored the second goal of a 2–0 win. On 10 February, he netted an 88th-minute winner in a 2–1 away defeat of Blackpool, a result which moved his team above AFC Bournemouth into first place.

García scored in a 3–0 win over Brentford on 15 May 2015, which advanced the hosts to the play-off final 5–1 on aggregate. He was a substitute in the decisive match, a 2–0 loss to Norwich City at Wembley Stadium.

On 15 August 2015, García scored his first two-goal haul for Middlesbrough, a first-half double in a 3–0 home win against Bolton Wanderers. He scored and assisted Christian Stuani on 19 December in a 3–0 victory at Brighton & Hove Albion, which ended the hosts' unbeaten season and put the opposition on top of the league table.

=== Eibar ===
The signings of strikers David Nugent and Jordan Rhodes at Middlesbrough led to speculation about García's future at the club, creating extra pressure for him to be included in the starting line-up. After interest from Leeds United and Wolverhampton Wanderers, he left and on 2 February 2016 signed for SD Eibar in the top flight, but a late registration meant that he would be ineligible to play until the following season.

García finally made his debut for the Basques on 19 August 2016, starting in a 2–1 away loss against Deportivo de La Coruña. He scored seven goals in his debut campaign – nine in all competitions – helping to a tenth-place finish.

On 1 May 2021, García scored all of his side's goals in the 3–0 home victory over Deportivo Alavés. He totalled 12 for the season, in an eventual relegation as last.

=== Osasuna ===
García continued in the Spanish top tier in the 2021 off-season, with the free agent joining CA Osasuna on a three-year contract with a €15 million buyout clause. He scored his first goal for his new team on 29 August, from the penalty spot in a 3–2 win at Cádiz CF.

García was top scorer in the 2022–23 edition of the Copa del Rey, finding the net five times in the early rounds during their run to the final.

=== Alavés ===
On 13 August 2023, García signed a two-year deal with Alavés, newly-promoted to the top tier. He scored just three goals in his debut campaign.

García managed his third hat-trick as a professional (second in the main division) on 18 January 2025, helping to a 3–1 away defeat of Real Betis. He totalled 13 goals for the season, best in the squad, but departed the club on 20 June 2025.

=== Espanyol ===
Hours after leaving Alavés, García moved to RCD Espanyol on a two-year contract.

== International career ==
García was called up to the Spain under-20 team in June 2009, for that year's Mediterranean Games. He was also in Luis Milla's list for the 2009 FIFA U-20 World Cup.

== Career statistics ==
As of match played 24 May 2025

Appearances and goals by club, season and competition
Club	Season	League			National cup (Note: Includes Copa del Rey, FA Cup)		League cup (Note: Includes EFL Cup)		Other		Total	
Club	Season	Division	Apps	Goals	Apps	Goals	Apps	Goals	Apps	Goals	Apps	Goals
Murcia B	2008–09	Segunda División B	34	8	—		—		—		34	8
Murcia	2008–09	Segunda División	4	1	0	0	—		—		4	1
Murcia	2009–10	Segunda División	31	3	3	0	—		—		34	3
Murcia	2010–11	Segunda División B	30	12	4	1	—		4 (Note: Appearances in Segunda División B promotion play-offs)	0	38	13
Murcia	2011–12	Segunda División	2	1	0	0	—		—		2	1
Murcia	2012–13	Segunda División	36	7	0	0	—		—		36	7
Murcia	2013–14	Segunda División	41	23	1	0	—		2 (Note: Appearances in La Liga play-offs)	0	44	23
Murcia	Total		144	47	8	1	0	0	6	0	158	48
Middlesbrough	2014–15	Championship	42	9	3	1	3	1	3 (Note: Appearances in the Football League play-offs)	1	51	12
Middlesbrough	2015–16	Championship	19	4	1	0	4	0	—		24	4
Middlesbrough	Total		61	13	4	1	7	1	3	1	75	16
Eibar	2016–17	La Liga	24	7	3	2	—		—		27	9
Eibar	2017–18	La Liga	35	8	2	0	—		—		37	8
Eibar	2018–19	La Liga	30	3	1	0	—		—		31	3
Eibar	2019–20	La Liga	27	5	0	0	—		—		27	5
Eibar	2020–21	La Liga	37	12	1	0	—		—		38	12
Eibar	Total		153	35	7	2	—		—		160	37
Osasuna	2021–22	La Liga	33	5	3	1	—		—		36	6
Osasuna	2022–23	La Liga	35	2	8	5	—		—		43	7
Osasuna	Total		68	7	11	6	—		—		79	13
Alavés	2023–24	La Liga	33	3	2	0	—		—		35	3
Alavés	2024–25	La Liga	35	13	1	2	—		—		36	15
Alavés	Total		68	16	3	2	—		—		71	18
Career total			528	126	33	12	7	1	9	1	577	140

== Honours ==
Murcia

- Segunda División B: 2010–11

Osasuna

- Copa del Rey runner-up: 2022–23

Spain U20

- Mediterranean Games: 2009

Individual

- Segunda División Player of the Month: May 2014
