= 2026–27 CA Osasuna season =

CA Osasuna
2026–27 season
- President: Luis Sabalza
- Head coach: Luis Miguel Ramis (until 12 October); Jagoba Arrasate (from 12 October)
- Stadium: El Sadar

The 2026–27 season of Club Atlético Osasuna is the 107th year of the club’s history and its eighth consecutive season in La Liga. The team also competed in the Copa del Rey.

== Season summary ==
On 12 October 2026, Luis Miguel Ramis was relieved of his duties as manager. The same day, Jagoba Arrasate was appointed manager.

== Players ==
As of 1 September 2026

Note: Flags indicate national team as defined under FIFA eligibility rules; some limited exceptions apply. Players may hold more than one non-FIFA nationality.

No.	Pos.	Nation	Player
1	GK	ESP	Sergio Herrera (3rd captain)
5	DF	ESP	Jorge Herrando
6	MF	ESP	Lucas Torró
7	MF	ESP	Jon Moncayola
8	MF	ESP	Iker Muñoz
9	FW	ESP	Raúl García
10	MF	ESP	Aimar Oroz
11	FW	ESP	Kike Barja (captain)
13	GK	ESP	Aitor Fernández
14	MF	ESP	Rubén García (vice-captain)
15	DF	ESP	Diego Rico
16	MF	ESP	Moi Gómez

No.	Pos.	Nation	Player
17	FW	CRO	Ante Budimir
18	FW	ESP	Raúl Moro
19	DF	FRA	Valentin Rosier
20	FW	FRA	Romain Del Castillo
21	MF	BEL	Jonathan Dubasin
22	DF	CMR	Enzo Boyomo
23	DF	ESP	Abel Bretones
24	DF	ESP	Alejandro Catena
26	MF	ESP	Mauro Echegoyen
27	DF	ESP	Iñigo Arguibide
29	MF	ESP	Asier Osambela
48	DF	GHA	Rockson Yeboah

=== Out on loan ===
Note: Flags indicate national team as defined under FIFA eligibility rules; some limited exceptions apply. Players may hold more than one non-FIFA nationality.

No.	Pos.	Nation	Player
—	GK	GRE	Dimitrios Stamatakis (at Ibiza until 30 June 2027)
—	MF	ESP	Anai Morales (at UD Logroñés until 30 June 2027)

No.	Pos.	Nation	Player
—	MF	ESP	Miguel Auría (at Mirandés until 30 June 2027)

== Transactions ==
=== Transfers in ===
Date	Pos.	Nat.	Name	Club	Fee	Ref.
27 July 2026	MF	(Belgium)	Jonathan Dubasin	(Spain) Sporting de Gijón	Transfer	
12 August 2026	DF	(Ghana)	Rockson Yeboah	(Sweden) IFK Göteborg	Transfer	
12 August 2026	DF	(Spain)	Diego Rico	(Spain) Getafe	Transfer	
1 September 2026	MF	(France)	Romain Del Castillo	(France) Brest	Transfer	

=== Transfers out ===
Date	Pos.	Nat.	Name	Club	Fee	Ref.
18 June 2026	MF	(Spain)	Víctor Muñoz	(England) Liverpool	€40 million	
30 June 2026	DF	(Spain)	Javi Galán	(Spain) RC Celta de Vigo	Transfer	
24 July 2026	MF	(Spain)	Juan Cruz	(Spain) Real Oviedo	Free transfer	
14 August 2026	MF	(Spain)	Iker Benito	(Mexico) Querétaro	Transfer	

== Competitions ==
=== La Liga ===
==== League table ====
Pos	Team	Pld	W	D	L	GF	GA	GD	Pts	Qualification or relegation
14	Rayo Vallecano	11	3	3	5	15	21	−6	12	
15	Getafe	12	3	3	6	8	18	−10	12	
16	Osasuna	12	3	3	6	12	23	−11	12	
17	Levante	12	2	5	5	16	21	−5	11	
18	Elche	12	2	4	6	14	20	−6	10	Relegation to Segunda División

Updated to match(es) played on 8 November 2026. Source: LaLiga EA Sports
Rules for classification: 1) Points; 2) Head-to-head points; 3) Head-to-head goal difference; 4) Goal difference; 5) Goals scored; 6) Fair-play points (if three or more teams tied); 7) Play-off at neutral site.
(Note: Head-to-head record is used only after all the matches between the teams in question have been played)

==== Matches ====
24 August 2026 1	Osasuna	0–0	Levante	Pamplona
19:30 CEST (UTC+2)	Barja (yellow card) 88'; Herrera (yellow card) 90+1'	Report	Romero (yellow card) 38'	Stadium: El Sadar; Attendance: 20,241; Referee: Víctor García Verdura

27 August 2026 2	Celta Vigo	1–2	Osasuna	Vigo
20:30 CEST (UTC+2)	Aspas 14'; Alonso (yellow card) 51' (red card)	Report	Dubasin (yellow card) 27'; Barja 54'; Budimir 64' (pen.)	Stadium: Balaídos Stadium; Attendance: 20,645; Referee: Miguel Sesma Espinosa

31 August 2026 3	Osasuna	1–0	Getafe	Pamplona
19:30 CEST (UTC+2)	Herrando (yellow card) 17'; Budimir 45+2' (pen.); Muñoz (yellow card) 67'; R. García (yellow card) 80'; Herrera (yellow card) 90+3'; Barja (yellow card) 90+4'	Report	Djené (yellow card) 45'; Mojica (yellow card) 58'; Ünal (yellow card) 60'; Mangala (yellow card) 65'	Stadium: El Sadar; Attendance: 19,672; Referee: Jon Ander González Esteban

6 September 2026 4	Alavés	5–2	Osasuna	Vitoria-Gasteiz
18:30 CEST (UTC+2)	Boyé 27', 51', 68'; Mariano 36'; Abde (yellow card) 62'; Ibáñez 90'	Report	Budimir 46', 64' (pen.); Bretones (yellow card) 58'; Rockson (yellow card) 84'	Stadium: Mendizorrotza Stadium; Attendance: 18,920; Referee: José María Sánchez Martínez

12 September 2026 5	Osasuna	0–2	Espanyol	Pamplona
16:15 CEST (UTC+2)	Barja (yellow card) 30'; Moncoyola (yellow card) 39'	Report	R. Fernández 3', 17'; Riedel (yellow card) 40'; El Hilali (yellow card) 45'; Hinojo (yellow card) 87'	Stadium: El Sadar; Attendance: 19,302; Referee: Luis Bestard Servera

16 September 2026 6	Atlético Madrid	4–0	Osasuna	Madrid
19:00 CEST (UTC+2)	David 24'; Lookman (yellow card) 50'; Lee Kang-in 54'; Le Normand 63'; Baena 82'	Report	Ru. García (yellow card) 86'; Bretones (yellow card) 90+3'	Stadium: Metropolitano Stadium; Attendance: 60,869; Referee: Francisco José Hernández Maeso

19 September 2026 7	Osasuna	1–1	Rayo Vallecano	Pamplona
14:00 CEST (UTC+2)	Budimir 16'; Osambela (yellow card) 21'; Moncayola (yellow card) 66'	Report	Ciss (yellow card) 24'; Camello 50'; Alemão (yellow card) 90+6'	Stadium: El Sadar; Attendance: 18,148; Referee: Manuel Jesús Orellana Cid

11 October 2026 8	Real Betis	5–2	Osasuna	Seville
18:30 CEST (UTC+2)	Isco 10' (pen.), 67'; Ezzalzouli 31'; Hernández (yellow card) 45+2'; Budimir 48' (o.g.); Roca (yellow card) 81'; Morante 90+6'	Report	Moncayola (yellow card) 41'; Santos (yellow card) 45'; Budimir 51'; García 56'; Torró (yellow card) 64'; Rosier (yellow card) 88'; Catena (yellow card) 90+6'	Stadium: La Cartuja; Attendance: 65,484; Referee: Carlos Muñiz Muñoz

18 October 2026 9	Osasuna	2–0	Racing de Santander	Pamplona
14:00 CEST (UTC+2)	Budimir 9' (pen.), (yellow card) 60'; Rosier (yellow card) 28'; Osambela 88'	Report	Mantilla (yellow card) 6'; Salinas (yellow card) 51'; Martín (yellow card) 80'	Stadium: El Sadar Stadium; Attendance: 20,818; Referee: Juan Martínez Munuera

26 October 2026 10	Sevilla	2–0	Osasuna	Seville
21:00 CET (UTC+1)	Romero 24', (yellow card) 55'; Correia 82'	Report	Catena (yellow card) 29'; Rosier (yellow card) 68'	Stadium: Ramón Sánchez-Pizjuán; Attendance: 38,523; Referee: Miguel Ángel Ortiz Arias

2 November 2026 11	Deportivo A Coruña	2–1	Osasuna	A Coruña
20:00 CET (UTC+1)	Soriano 64'; Nsongo 87'	Report	Budimir 32'; Gómez (yellow card) 35'; Catena (yellow card) 63'; Bretones (yellow card) 81'	Stadium: Estadio Riazor; Attendance: 26,831; Referee: Jon González Esteban

7 November 2026 12	Osasuna	1–1	Athletic Bilbao	Pamplona
17:30 CET (UTC+1)	Moncayola (yellow card) 45+2'; Budimir (yellow card) 54'; Catena 90'; Muñoz (yellow card) 90+4'	Report	N. Williams 84'; Sancet (yellow card) 90+3'	Stadium: El Sadar Stadium; Attendance: 20,768; Referee: Ion Rodríguez Portela

22 November 2026 13	Osasuna	v	Málaga CF

29 November 2026 14	Valencia CF	v	Osasuna

6 December 2026 15	Osasuna	v	Elche CF

13 December 2026 16	Real Madrid CF	v	Osasuna

20 December 2026 17	Osasuna	v	Villarreal CF

3 January 2027 18	Real Sociedad	v	Osasuna

10 January 2027 19	Osasuna	v	FC Barcelona

17 January 2027 20	Racing de Santander	v	Osasuna

24 January 2027 21	Getafe CF	v	Osasuna

31 January 2027 22	Osasuna	v	Deportivo de A Coruña

7 February 2027 23	Athletic Bilbao	v	Osasuna

14 February 2027 24	Osasuna	v	Athletic Bilbao

21 February 2027 25	RCD Espanyol	v	Osasuna

28 February 2027 26	Osasuna	v	Sevilla FC

7 March 2027 27	Rayo Vallecano	v	Osasuna

14 March 2027 28	Osasuna	v	RC Celta de Vigo

21 March 2027 29	Levante UD	v	Osasuna

4 April 2027 30	Málaga CF	v	Osasuna

11 April 2027 31	Osasuna	v	Real Madrid CF

18 April 2027 32	Elche CF	v	Osasuna

21 April 2027 33	Osasuna	v	Deportivo Alavés

2 May 2027 34	FC Barcelona	v	Osasuna

9 May 2027 35	Osasuna	v	Real Sociedad

16 May 2027 36	Osasuna	v	Real Betis

23 May 2027 37	Villarreal CF	v	Osasuna

30 May 2027 38	Osasuna	v	Valencia CF

=== Copa del Rey ===
29 October 2026	Atlético Calatayud	0–6	Osasuna	Calatayud
19:00		Report	Ra. García 13', 39', 59'; Barja 29'; Dubasin 52'; Bonel 82'	Stadium: San Íñigo
