= 2025–26 CA Osasuna season =

CA Osasuna
2025–26 season
- President: Luis Sabalza
- Head coach: Alessio Lisci
- Stadium: El Sadar
- La Liga: 17th
- Copa del Rey: Round of 16
- Top goalscorer: League: Ante Budimir (16); All: Ante Budimir (18)
colours	Away colours	Third colours

The 2025–26 season was the 106th year in the history of Club Atlético Osasuna and its seventh consecutive season in Spain’s premier football division, La Liga. The team was eliminated in the round of 16 of the Copa del Rey. On 23 June 2025, Osasuna officially named Italian manager Alessio Lisci as head coach, signing him to a two-year contract.

== Transfers ==
=== In ===
Pos.	Player	Transferred from	Fee	Date	Source
DF	(France) Valentin Rosier	(Spain) Leganés		1 July 2025	
FW	(Spain) Víctor Muñoz	(Spain) Real Madrid Castilla		11 July 2025	
FW	(Suriname) Sheraldo Becker	(Spain) Real Sociedad		1 September 2025	
DF	(Spain) Javi Galán	(Spain) Atlético Madrid	500,000	1 January 2026	

== Pre-season and friendlies ==
19 July 2025	Lorient (France)	1–1	(Spain) Osasuna
18:00

26 July 2025	Osasuna	0–2	Huesca
19:00

30 July 2025	Real Sociedad	4–1	Osasuna
19:00

2 August 2025	Osasuna	0–1	Racing Santander
19:00

6 August 2025	Osasuna	3–0	Mirandés
19:00

9 August 2025	SC Freiburg (Germany)	2–2	(Spain) Osasuna
15:30

4 September 2025	Athletic Bilbao	0–1	Osasuna
20:30

9 October 2025	Real Sociedad	2–0	Osasuna
11:00

== Competitions ==
=== La Liga ===
Pos	Team	Pld	W	D	L	GF	GA	GD	Pts	Qualification or relegation
15	Elche	38	10	13	15	49	57	−8	43 (Note: Head-to-head points: Sevilla 6, Alavés 5, Elche 3.)	
16	Levante	38	11	9	18	47	61	−14	42 (Note: Head-to-head points: Levante 7, Osasuna 5, Mallorca 3.)	
17	Osasuna	38	11	9	18	44	50	−6	42	
18	Mallorca (R)	38	11	9	18	47	57	−10	42	Relegation to Segunda División
19	Girona (R)	38	9	14	15	39	55	−16	41	Relegation to Segunda División

Source: LaLiga EA Sports
Rules for classification: 1) Points; 2) Head-to-head points; 3) Head-to-head goal difference; 4) Goal difference; 5) Goals scored; 6) Fair-play points
(Note: Head-to-head record is used only after all the matches between the teams in question have been played)
(R) Relegated

==== Results summary ====
Overall								Home						Away					
Pld	W	D	L	GF	GA	GD	Pts	W	D	L	GF	GA	GD	W	D	L	GF	GA	GD
33	11	9	13	39	39	0	42	9	5	2	28	17	+11	2	4	11	11	22	−11

==== Results by round ====
Round	1	2	3	4	5	6	7	8	9	10	11	12	13	14	15	16	17	18
Ground	A	H	A	H	A	H	A	H	A	H	A	A	H	A	H	A	H	H
Result	L	W	L	W	L	D	L	W	L	L	D	L	L	D	W	L	W	D
Position																		

A = Away; H = Home; W = Win; D = Draw; L = Loss

==== Matches ====
19 August 2025 1	Real Madrid	1–0	Osasuna	Madrid
21:00	Mbappe 51' (pen.)			Attendance: 68,407

24 August 2025 2	CA Osasuna	1–0	Valencia	El Sadar Stadium
	Budimir 9'	Report	Gayà (red card) 22'	Attendance: 21,226; Referee: Jesús Gil Manzano

31 August 2025 3	Espanyol	1–0	Osasuna	Cornellà de Llobregat
19:30

14 September 2025 4	Osasuna	2–0	Rayo Vallecano	Pamplona
18:30				Stadium: El Sadar

20 September 2025 5	Villarreal	2–1	Osasuna	Villarreal
18:30

25 September 2025 6	Osasuna	1–1	Elche	Pamplona
19:30				Stadium: El Sadar

28 September 2025 7	Real Betis	2–0	Osasuna	Seville
21:00

3 October 2025 8	Osasuna	2–1	Getafe	Pamplona
21:00				Stadium: El Sadar

18 October 2025 9	Atletico Madrid	1–0	Osasuna	Madrid
21:00

26 October 2025 10	Osasuna	2–3	Celta Vigo	Pamplona
18:30				Stadium: El Sadar

3 November 2025 11	Oviedo	0–0	Osasuna	Oviedo
21:00				Stadium: Estadio Carlos Tartiere; Attendance: 23,795

8 November 2025 12	Sevilla	1–0	Osasuna	Seville
16:15	Vargas 51' (pen.)

22 November 2025 13/3	Osasuna	1–3	Real Sociedad	Osasuna
18:30 CET (UTC+1)	Catena 42', (yellow card) 90+1'; Arguibide (red card); Fernández (yellow card) 88'; Oroz (yellow card) 90'	Report	Méndez (yellow card) 30', (goal) 53'; Martín (yellow card) 54'; Guedes 59'; Barrenetxea 82'	Stadium: El Sadar; Attendance: 21,377; Referee: Mateo Busquets Ferrer

29 November 2025 14	Mallorca	2–2	Osasuna	Palma
14:00

8 December 2025 15	Osasuna	2–0	Levante	Pamplona
21:00				Stadium: El Sadar

13 December 2025 16	Barcelona	2–0	Osasuna	Barcelona
18:30				Stadium: Camp Nou; Attendance: 42,058

20 December 2025 17/5	Osasuna	3–0	Alavés	Pamplona
18:30	García 90+3'; Budimir 72', 82' (pen.)	Report		Stadium: El Sadar; Attendance: 20,408; Referee: César Soto Grado

3 January 2026 19/6	Osasuna	1–1	Athletic Bilbao	Pamplona
	García 34'; Moncayola (yellow card) 67'; Catena (yellow card) 73'; Herrando (yellow card) 77'	Report	Paredes (yellow card) 9'; Boiro (yellow card) 53'; Guruzeta 71'; Berenguer (yellow card) 73'	Stadium: Estadio El Sadar; Attendance: 22,010; Referee: José Luis Munuera Montero

10 January 2026 19	Girona	1–0	Osasuna	Girona
18:30

17 January 2026 20	Osasuna	3–2	Oviedo	Pamplona
18:30				Stadium: El Sadar

24 January 2026 21	Rayo Vallecano	1–3	Osasuna	Madrid
14:00

31 January 2026 22	Osasuna	2–2	Villarreal	Pamplona
16:15				Stadium: El Sadar

6 February 2026 23	Celta Vigo	1–2	Osasuna	Vigo
21:00

13 February 2026 24	Elche	0–0	Osasuna	Elche
21:00

21 February 2026 25	Osasuna	2–1	Real Madrid	Pamplona
18:30				Stadium: El Sadar; Attendance: 22,485

1 March 2026 26	Valencia	1–0	Osasuna	Valencia
16:15

7 March 2026 27	Osasuna	2–2	Mallorca	Pamplona
14:00				Stadium: El Sadar

15 March 2026 28/8	Real Sociedad	3–1	Osasuna	San Sebastián
21:00 CET (UTC+1)	Oyarzabal 24' (pen.); Guedes 28', 52'; Turrientes (yellow card) 59'; Óskarsson (yellow card) 78'; Zubeldia (yellow card) 82'	Report	Muñoz 77'	Stadium: Anoeta; Attendance: 30,856; Referee: Guillermo Cuadra Fernández

21 March 2026 29	Osasuna	1–0	Girona	Pamplona
18:30				Stadium: El Sadar

5 April 2026 30/9	Alavés	2–2	Osasuna	Vitoria-Gasteiz
21:00	Boyé 90+1' (pen.); Martínez 44'	Report	Osambela (red card) 90'; Budimir 80' (pen.); Rosier 4'	Stadium: Mendizorrotza; Attendance: 17,736; Referee: César Soto Grado

12 April 2026 31	Osasuna	1–1	Real Betis	Pamplona
14:00				Stadium: El Sadar

21 April 2026 33	Athletic Bilbao	1–0	Osasuna	Bilbao
19:00	Jauregizar (yellow card) 10' (yellow-red card) 90+1'; Guruzeta 16'; I. Williams (yellow card) 90+7'		Oroz (yellow card) 48'; Budimir (penalty missed) , 57; Gómez (yellow card) 90+8'	Stadium: San Mamés Stadium

26 April 2026 32	Osasuna	2–1	Sevilla	Pamplona
18:30				Stadium: El Sadar; Referee: Miguel Ángel Ortiz Arias

2 May 2026 34	Osasuna	1–2	Barcelona	Pamplona
21:00				Stadium: El Sadar

=== Copa del Rey ===
29 October 2025 First round	Sant Jordi	0–5	Osasuna	Palma
19:00		Report		Stadium: Son Malferit

2 December 2025 Second round	Ebro	3–5	Osasuna	Ebro
19:00

17 December 2025 Round of 32	Huesca	2–4 (a.e.t.)	Osasuna	Huesca
19:00

13 January 2026 Round of 16	Real Sociedad	2–2 (a.e.t.) (4–3 p)	Osasuna	San Sebastian
21:00				Stadium: Anoeta Municipal Stadium; Attendance: 30,147

== Statistics ==
=== Goalscorers ===
Rank	Pos.	Player	La Liga	Copa	Total
1	FW	(Croatia) Ante Budimir	16	2	18
2	FW	(Spain) Raúl García	6	7	13
3	FW	(Spain) Víctor Muñoz	5	1	6
