= Muguiro (footballer) =

Spanish footballer and manager (1905–1983)

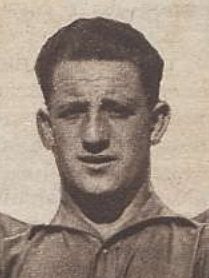
- Muguiro in 1932

Personal information
- Full name: Martín José Nicolas Mariano Muguiro Aguirrebarrena
- Date of birth: 12 September 1905
- Place of birth: Aldatz, Spain
- Date of death: 3 January 1983 (aged 77)
- Place of death: Pamplona, Spain
- Position: Defender

Senior career*
Years	Team	Apps	(Gls)
1922–1936	CA Osasuna	9	(0)

Managerial career
- 1931–1932: CA Osasuna
- * Club domestic league appearances and goals

Martín José Nicolas Mariano Muguiro Aguirrebarrena, better known as Muguiro (12 September 1905 – 3 January 1983), was a Spanish footballer who played as a forward for CA Osasuna between 1922 and 1936.

== Early life ==
Martín José Muguiro was born in the Navarre town of Aldatz on 12 September 1905, (Note: Some sources wrongly claim that he was born in 1906.) as the second of five siblings from the marriage formed by Pedro Muguiro Huici (1872–) and Magdalena Aguirrebarrena Tapia 1872–).

== Career ==
Muguiro began his career at Osasuna during the 1922-1923 season, with whom he played for over a decade, until the outbreak of the Spanish Civil War in 1936. Having started as a left winger, he later played in the center forward position before settling as a defender. This versatility was also clear off the field, as he performed in other modalities, such as Basque pelota and athletics, where he particularly stood out in throwing competitions due to the strength of his arm, winning the discus and javelin throw, plus the shot put, in the 1925 Navarrese Championships. He became such a renowned javelin thrower that the local press even compared him to the national stars, and on one occasion, he participated in an throwing exhibition at San Mamés, which was held during the break of a friendly match against Athletic Bilbao.

In 1928, Muguiro was a member of the Osasuna team that participated in the inaugural edition of the Tercera División, which ended in relegation, but the club bounced back the following season. In the 1931–32 season, he worked as a player-coach, guiding his side to a promotion to the Segunda División without losing a single home match. Together with José Antonio Urreaga, the Bienzobas brothers (Anastasio and Francisco), and the Urdiroz brothers (Emilio and Martín), he helped Osasuna to a runner-up finish at the 1934–35 Segunda División, thus achieving promotion to the top flight for the first time in the club's history. In his last season at the club (1935–36), he played a total of 9 La Liga matches.

Despite sharing a dressing room with professionals, Muguiro remained faithful to his amateur spirit and was never paid, as he played football purely for the pleasure of it, unrelated to official status. During the War, both he and his fellow Osasuna teammate José Antonio Urreaga were wounded by shrapnel, being discharged from the Pamplona Hospital in January 1939. These injuries forced him to retire from football.

== Death ==
Muguiro died on 3 January 1983, at the age of 77. At the end of his life, he filed a contentious administrative appeal, which was only resolved in April 1983, a few months after he died, being described as a "Infantry Sergeant and Permanently Disqualified Knight". He married Maria Jesus Meoqui, with whom he had three children, including María Ángeles, who was a distinguished pentathlete in the 1960s, standing out also on the javelin and the shot put, setting a Navarrese record in the latter event which stood for 14 years.
