= Urdiroz =

Urdiroz is a Spanish surname. Notable people with the surname include:

- Emilio Urdiroz (1906–1974), Spanish footballer
- Filomeno Urdiroz (1904–1937), Spanish footballer
- Martín Urdiroz (1911–1994), Spanish footballer
