= Alzate =

Alzate is a surname. Notable people with the surname include:

- Aníbal Alzate (1933–2016), Colombian footballer
- Carlos Alzate (born 1983), Colombian track and road racing cyclist
- José Luis Serna Alzate (1936–2014), Colombian Roman Catholic bishop
- Pepe Alzate (born 1942), Spanish footballer and manager
- Steven Alzate (born 1998), English footballer
