= Muguiro (surname) =

Muguiro is a Spanish surname. Notable people with the surname include:

- Fernando Muguiro (1897–1969), Spanish footballer who played for Real Madrid
- Jesús Mari Ilundain Muguiro (born 1942), Spanish footballer
- Juan Bautista Muguiro e Iribarren (born 1786), Spanish merchant, banker, and politician
- María del Pilar de Muguiro y Beruete, 1st Duchess of Villafranca de los Caballeros, a Spanish noblewoman
- Martín José Muguiro (1905–1983), Spanish footballer and manager
- Miguel Ángel de Muguiro (1880–1954), Spanish diplomat

== See also ==
- Mugiro, a town in Navarre sometimes written as Muguiro
