= 1928–29 Real Sociedad season =

Real Sociedad
1928–29 season
- Chairman: Luis Pradera
- Manager: Benito Díaz
- Stadium: Atotxa Stadium
- La Liga: 4th
- King Alfonso XIII's Cup: Round of 16
- Top goalscorer: Paco Bienzobas (17)

The 1928–29 season was Real Sociedad's first season in La Liga. As one of the six clubs to have won the cup Real Sociedad were invited to take part and were thus one of the founding members of the 1st division.

League matches were played from February to June 1929. Real Sociedad finished in 4th position. In the King Alfonso XIII's Cup Real Sociedad faced Patria Aragón, who they beat with ease. In the next round Real Sociedad were knocked out by FC Barcelona, the holders.

== Squad ==
Note: Flags indicate national team as defined under FIFA eligibility rules; some limited exceptions apply. Players may hold more than one non-FIFA nationality.

No.	Pos.	Nation	Player
—	GK	ESP	Jesús Izaguirre Goena
—	DF	ESP	Félix Ilundain Tulie
—	MF	ESP	Amadeo Labarta Rey
—	FW	ESP	José María Aranburu Mugika "Belauste"
—	MF	ESP	Luis Cauqual Uribe
—	MF	ESP	Martín Marculeta
—	DF	ESP	Tomás Galdós Uzcanga
—	DF	ESP	Jesús Labarta Rey

No.	Pos.	Nation	Player
—	MF	ESP	Trino Arizcorreta
—	FW	ESP	Paco Bienzobas
—	FW	ESP	Luis Iruretagoyena "Kiriki"
—	FW	ESP	Ignacio María Alcorta Hermoso "Cholín"
—	FW	ESP	Ángel Mariscal Beuba
—	FW	ESP	Mariano Yurrita
—	GK	ESP	José Zubeldia

== Player stats ==
Squad stats
Player	Games played	Full games	Games starting	Used as sub	Minutes	Injuries	Cards	Sending-offs	Goals	Missed penalties
AMADEO L.	18	18	18	0	1620	0	0	0	0	0
BELAUSTE	2	2	2	0	180	0	0	0	2	0
CAUCAL	1	1	1	0	90	0	0	0	0	0
CHOLIN	16	16	16	0	1440	0	0	0	8	0
GALDOS, T.	18	18	18	0	1620	0	0	0	0	0
ILUNDAIN	18	18	18	0	1620	0	0	0	0	0
IZAGUIRRE G.	18	18	18	0	1620	0	0	0	0	0
KIRIKI	18	18	18	0	1620	0	0	0	9	0
LABARTA	1	1	1	0	90	0	0	0	0	0
MARCULETA	18	17	18	0	1598	0	0	1	2	0
MARISCAL B.	17	17	17	0	1530	0	0	0	3	0
P. BIENZOBAS	18	18	18	0	1620	0	0	0	17	0
TRINO	17	17	17	0	1530	0	0	0	1	0
YURRITA	18	18	18	0	1620	0	0	0	3	0

== League results ==
10/02/1929 1	Real Sociedad	1–1	Athletic Bilbao	San Sebastián
	Paco Bienzobas 30'	(Report)	43' Bergaretxe	Stadium: Atotxa Stadium; Referee: Serrano de la Mata

17/02/1929 2	Atlético Madrid	0–3	Real Sociedad	Madrid
		(Report)	20' Paco Bienzobas; 31' "Cholín"; 41' "Kiriki"	Stadium: Estadio Metropolitano de Madrid; Referee: Areces

24/02/1929 3	Real Sociedad	3–0	FC Barcelona	San Sebastián
	"Kiriki" 18'; Paco Bienzobas 42' "Cholín" 52'	(Report)		Stadium: Atotxa Stadium; Referee: Quintana

03/03/1929 4	Real Madrid	2–1	Real Sociedad	Madrid
	Jaime Lazcano 9'; Rafael Morera López 37'	(Report)	58' Paco Bienzobas	Stadium: Estadio Chamartín; Referee: Vilalta Bars

10/03/1929 5	Real Sociedad	1–1	Espanyol	San Sebastián
	"Cholín" 57'	(Report)	75' José Padrón	Stadium: Atotxa Stadium; Referee: Navaz

24/03/1929 6	Arenas Club de Getxo	3–0	Real Sociedad	Getxo
	Gurruchaga 23'; José Maria Yermo 67', 82'	(Report)		Stadium: Ibaiondo; Referee: Ledesma

31/03/1929 7	Real Sociedad	8–1	Racing Santander	San Sebastián
	Trino Arizcorreta 12'; Mariano Yurrita 21'; Paco Bienzobas 29', 67' "Cholín" 34'; Santiuste 40' o.g "Kiriki" 42', 73'	(Report)	40' Larrinaga	Stadium: Atotxa Stadium; Referee: Escartín

07/04/1929 8	Real Unión	2–3	Real Sociedad	Irun
	Garmendia 13', 38'	(Report)	54' (pen.), 88' Paco Bienzobas; 67' "Kiriki"; (red card) 68' Martín Marculeta	Stadium: Stadium Gal; Referee: Cruella

21/04/1929 9	CE Europa	4–3	Real Sociedad	Barcelona
	Alcázar 13'; Mauricio 28'; Cros 39'; Pellicer 57'	(Report)	2', 53' (pen.) Paco Bienzobas; 85' "Kiriki"	Stadium: El Guinardó; Referee: Ramón Melcón

28/04/1929 10	Athletic Bilbao	4–2	Real Sociedad	Bilbao
	Víctor Unamuno 34', 66'; Juan Bilbao Mintegi 50' (pen.); Mandalúniz 73'	(Report)	8' "Cholín"; 33' "Kiriki"	Stadium: San Mamés Stadium; Referee: Barrena

09/05/1929 11	Real Sociedad	3–3	Atlético Madrid	San Sebastián
	Paco Bienzobas 30' (pen.); Mariano Yurrita 35' "Cholín" 69'	(Report)	28' De Miguel; 59', 89' Cosme	Stadium: Atotxa Stadium; Referee: Serrano de la Mata

19/05/1929 12	Real Sociedad	5–4	Real Madrid	San Sebastián
	"Kiriki" 1'; Ángel Mariscal Beuba 35'; Paco Bienzobas 38' (pen.); Martín Marculeta 81' "Cholín" 88'	(Report)	20' Del Campo; 53' Gaspar Rubio; 68', 80' Jaime Lazcano	Stadium: Atotxa Stadium; Referee: Comorera Gatuellas

26/05/1929 13	Espanyol	1–1	Real Sociedad	Barcelona
	Gallart 76'	(Report)	12' Paco Bienzobas	Stadium: Estadi de Sarrià; Referee: Ramón Melcón

30/05/1929 14	FC Barcelona	1–0	Real Sociedad	Barcelona
	Josep Samitier 32'	(Report)		Stadium: Camp de Les Corts; Referee: Escartín

02/06/1929 15	Real Sociedad	3–2	Arenas Club de Getxo	San Sebastián
	"Cholín" 4'; Paco Bienzobas 37'; Martín Marculeta 53'	(Report)	5' Menchaca; 85' Gurruchaga	Stadium: Atotxa Stadium; Referee: Serrano de la Mata

09/06/1929 16	Racing Santander	6–1	Real Sociedad	Santander
	Amós 36' (pen.), 43'; Loredo 73', 77'; Acebo 81', 87'	(Report)	15' Ángel Mariscal Beuba	Stadium: El Sardinero; Referee: Cruella

16/06/1929 17	Real Sociedad	3–2	Real Unión	San Sebastián
	Mariano Yurrita 43'; Paco Bienzobas 71'; Ángel Mariscal Beuba 84'	(Report)	29' Luis Regueiro; 53' Garmendia	Stadium: Atotxa Stadium; Referee: Vilalta Bars

23/06/1929 18	Real Sociedad	5–4	CE Europa	San Sebastián
	Paco Bienzobas 40', 68'; José María Aranburu Mugika "Belauste" 60', 62' "Kiriki" 87'	(Report)	20' Mauricio; 54' Ciordia; 56' (red card) 59' Bestit; 74' Xifreu; (red card) 67' Cros	Stadium: Atotxa Stadium; Referee: Navaz

== Final position in the league ==
Pos	Team	Pld	W	D	L	GF	GA	GD	Pts
3	Athletic Bilbao	18	8	4	6	43	33	+10	20
4	Real Sociedad	18	8	4	6	46	41	+5	20
5	Arenas Club	18	8	3	7	32	39	-7	19
