= Emilio Urdiroz =

Spanish footballer and manager

Personal information
- Birth name: Emilio Urdiroz Apezarena
- Date of birth: 11 February 1906
- Place of birth: Agoitz, Navarre, Spain
- Date of death: 23 February 1974 (aged 68)
- Place of death: Unknown
- Position: Forward

Senior career*
Years	Team	Apps	(Gls)
1926–1927	Zaragoza CD		
1928–1935	CA Osasuna		

Managerial career
- 1932–1936: CA Osasuna
- 1941–1942: CD Tudelano
- 1942–1944: CA Osasuna
- * Club domestic league appearances and goals

Emilio Urdiroz Apezarena (11 February 1906 – 23 February 1974), also known as Urdiroz I, was a Spanish footballer who played as a forward for Real Zaragoza and CA Osasuna, and later a manager of Osasuna. His brothers Filo and Martín (Urdiroz II) also played football for Osasuna.

== Early life ==
Emilio Urdiroz was born on 11 February 1906 in Agoitz, Navarre, into a working-class family committed to football and Navarrese socialism. His father, Leandro Urdíroz Larequi, died in a tragic work accident, hit by a train, at the El Irati company, and his mother, Feliciana Apezarena Labayen, when widowed, moved to Pamplona, bringing eight children with her. From a very young age, they had to work hard as carpenters, mechanics, shoemakers, or El Irati auditors. The desire to fight for the common good led almost the entire family to political and union militancy.

== Playing career ==
Urdiroz was a carpenter and mechanic by profession and alternated his work activities with playing football as a defender, being one of the co-founders of Zaragoza CD in 1925, at the age of 19, which was the result of the merger of Athletic Stadium (founded in 1919) and Zaragoza FC (founded in 1921). Together with Adolfo Álvarez-Buylla and José Luis Costa, Urdiroz helped his side to become the finalist of the Aragón Regional Championship in 1927, a position that allowed the club to participate in the Copa del Rey for the first time, being eliminated in the group stage.

In 1928, Urdiroz was signed by Osasuna of Segunda División, where despite playing in 14 matches, he was unable to avoid relegation to the Tercera División, but together with José Antonio Urreaga, the Bienzobas brothers (Anastasio and Francisco), and his own younger brother Martín, they returned to the Second division just two seasons later. A meniscus injury forced him to retire prematurely.

== Managerial career ==
Following his meniscus injury, Urdiroz began playing less, serving the club as a player-coach from 1932 to 1935, stating in his debut that "As soon as we score a goal, I'll take center back". In his first full season as manager in 1934–35, he led the club to its first promotion to the First Division.

Urdiroz went to prison on Christmas Eve 1936 and was released on 15 January 1937. Four days later, on 21 January, his older brother was shot dead. According to records, a year later, on 25 January 1938, together with his brother Rafael and his brother-in-law, Francisco Arraiza, they passed the Basque Country border to France, who helped them with clothes and food. Later they reached the republican zone in Catalonia, where Emilio fought in the Basque-Alpine Republican Battalion. After the Republican defeat, he had to request asylum, in his case in the Argelès-sur-Mer concentration camp, in the south of France, living in very harsh conditions, while Rafael went into exile in Chile. Urdiroz then went to Lannemezan where he worked in a munitions factory and coached a local team for one season before returning to Spain, where he went through a kind of concentration camp in Madrid.

Urdiroz was forbidden to return to Pamplona, so he settled in Tudela, where after coaching CD Tudelano between 1941 and 1942, he was rescued by Osasuna of the second division, who was in a moment of crisis, but he managed to save the team from relegation and led them to a third-place finish. In the following season, however, he could not avoid relegation to the third division.

== Death ==
In order to protect them, Emilio told his children to not get involved in politics.

Urdiroz died on 23 February 1974, at the age of 68.
