= Oroz =

Oroz or Oróz may refer to:

== People ==
- Aimar Oroz (born 2001), Spanish footballer
- Andrés Oroz (born 1980), Chilean footballer
- Juan José Oroz (born 1980), Spanish road bicycle racer
- Maite Oroz (born 1998), Spanish footballer
- Rodolfo Oroz (1895–1997), Chilean writer, professor, and philologist

== Other uses ==
- Estadio Tomás Oroz Gaytán, a stadium in Ciudad Obregón, Mexico
- Oroz-Betelu, a town and municipality located in Navarre, Spain
- Os Trapalhões e o Mágico de Oróz, the 1984 entry in the Brazilian comedy film series Os Trapalhões
