= Filomeno Urdiroz =

Spanish footballer

Personal information
- Birth name: Filomeno Urdiroz Apezarena
- Date of birth: 6 July 1904
- Place of birth: Burguete, Spain
- Date of death: 21 January 1937 (aged 32)
- Place of death: Izurzu, Spain
- Position: Goalkeeper

Senior career*
Years	Team	Apps	(Gls)
1923–1929	Aurora SC		
1929	CA Osasuna	2	(0)
1929–1931	Aurora SC		
- * Club domestic league appearances and goals

Filomeno Urdiroz Apezarena (6 July 1904 – 21 January 1937), better known by his nickname Filo Urdiroz, was a Spanish footballer who played as a goalkeeper for CA Osasuna. His younger brothers Emilio (Urdiroz I) and Martín (Urdiroz II) also played football for Osasuna. The three brothers were linked to left-wing organizations and a few days after the coup, Filomeno was arrested, imprisoned and finally shot in Izurzu.

== Early life ==
Filomeno Urdiroz was born on 6 July 1904 in Burguete, Navarre, into a working-class family committed to football and Navarrese socialism. His father, Leandro Urdíroz Larequi, died in a work accident, hit by a train, at the El Irati company, and his mother, Feliciana Apezarena Labayen, when widowed, moved to Pamplona, bringing eight children with her (Filo being the third). From a very young age, they had to work hard as carpenters, mechanics, shoemakers, or El Irati auditors. The desire to fight for the common good led almost the entire family to political and union militancy.

== Playing career ==
Urdiroz was a carpenter by profession and alternated his work activities with playing football as a goalkeeper, being one of the co-founders of Aurora SC in 1923, at the age of 19, which competed in the Gipuzkoa Championship, like the rest of the Navarrese teams, until 1928. When the Spanish national league was inaugurated in 1929, Osasuna was facing difficult times, having no clear project and with disappearance looming on the horizon, so they decided to select players from other close by teams, such as Indarra, Peña Sport, Izarra and Aurora, and create a team with those available, recruiting a total of eleven players, including Filo of Aurora. He made his debut with Osasuna in a Segunda División match against Real Murcia on 16 June 1929, conceding six goals in a 0–6 loss. Some of the eleven players who played that day will never appear in the club's official data, such as Filomeno, whose name appeared as "Urreaga" in the press, when in reality Filo was the only goalkeeper on the trip to Murcia. "Urreaga" played two more matches for Osasuna, against Cartagena FC on 23 June (1–5), and in a friendly match, also around this time. He then returned to the ranks of Aurora, where he faced both of his Osasunista brothers, first against Emilio and years later against Martín.

== Professional career ==
Urdiroz also worked in construction, at the Erroz y San Martín company, probably assembling formwork, doors, and windows, being one of the builders of Segundo Ensanche de Pamplona. His brother Rafael worked as a shoemaker and was affiliated with the International Workers' Day Various Trades Society of Oroz-Betelu, and later, three brothers, Filo, Rafael, and Teodoro, were linked to the Health and Culture Society, in turn, affiliated to the UGT, where Filo initially served as the Society's football delegate, and later as vice president. Feliciana, her mother, contributed with a donation of 5 pesetas, and her son Andrés three, for the PSOE advertising campaign for the 1933 Spanish general election. His sister Teresa married Alipio Nebreda, a socialist, PSOE activist, monetary contributor, and who presided over the Navarre Football Federation for 20 years, from 1934 to 1954.

In April 1936, Filo participated in the unification assembly of the Socialist and Communist Youth that took place in the Schools of San Francisco and was elected secretary of the masses, which indicates the trust he generated among his comrades.

== Later life and death ==
On 26 July 1936, seven days after the coup, Urdiroz was arrested, and on 16 December 1936, after six months in the Pamplona Prison, he was released, the so-called "black freedom" because everyone knew that they would be murdered or "shot". During his time in prison, he was one of Galo Vierge's five cellmates, and one morning on the patio, Urdiroz approached Galo with a newspaper in his hand and said: "Congratulations, Galo, you have had a daughter, her name is in the Civil Registry of today's Diario". Four days after his release from prison, his brothers Rafael and Andrés were also imprisoned.

Following his release, he decided to spend the night at his parents' house, with his wife Petra, and on the next day, they went to their house on 17 Paulino Caballero Street, an address which he shared with Urla Aramburu and Florencio Alfaro Zabalegui, who in August had been arrested and murdered in Valcaldera. After their neighbors alerted them that a group of the Falange armed with rifles and pistols had repeatedly knocked on the door of their apartment, the couple decided to go to the Military Captaincy to clarify the situation and request a guarantee to ensure their lives, and perhaps due to the approach of Christmas and the news of a certain de-escalation of the murders, the couple harbored hope and trusted in some kind of mercy. However, the military command, who stated "You were where you are safest. In jail, no one will bother you there!", ordered Urdiroz to be arrested and thrown back into the Pamplona Prison, which was now demolished, so a month later, he was transferred to a farm in Izurzu near a small town called Cizur, where he was shot in the company of a lawyer from Santander on 21 January 1937, at the age of 32. Three years later, on 6 December 1939, Petra managed to exhume his body and transfer it to the Pamplona cemetery.

Coincidentally, in a match for Aurora against his former club Osasuna in the 1930–31 Tercera División, Urdiroz conceded a goal from Andrés Jaso, and both went on to be killed in the Spanish Civil War. The president of Aurora CD, Enrique Astiz Aranguren, was the lawyer who defended Osasuna manager Alberto Lorenzo in the Luis de Sirval case, and both were shot after the coup. Two other members of the Aurora board also appeared shot in the FDMHN, and two other members of the board were imprisoned: Félix Lezáun Ros and Josefa Lorca Aquerreta.

== Legacy ==
On 23 March 2024, the town of Auritz/Burguete raised a memorial for the murders and repression of 1936 in the presence of family members, and Urdiroz's name was among the eight recorded on the plaque that was placed on the monolith, the work of Begoña Munarriz Guezala.
