= Walter Harris (football manager) =

English football manager

Personal information
- Place of birth: Birmingham, England
- Athletic Bilbao
- 1922: Real Unión
- 1922: Basque Country
- 1922–192x: Real Unión
- 1923: Celta de Vigo
- 1924: France (assistant)
- 1925–1928: Osasuna
- 1928: Alavés
- 1928–1929: Real Málaga
- 1932: Hércules
- 1932–1933: Atlético de Madrid

Walter Harris was an English football manager.

== Football career ==
Walter Harris served as a devoted member to the Spanish football society, during his time he also of accumulated a massage and bath business in Droitwich Spa. He may have possibly been a player who went by the name Walter Harris, based on archive records in 1906 at Barcelona of the same name, although this is not confirmed. It is here he may have begun his career in Spanish football, eventually going on to become a club manager within Spain.

Known in Spanish football as Mr. Harris, arrived in Spain in 1922 to coach the historic team Real Unión. In 1922 he was the coach of the Basque Country. In 1924 he moved to Paris, where he carried out work as a masseur and assistant manager of the France national team in the Paris Olympics of 1924, he became assistant trainer to Tom Griffiths. The data on his career is difficult to collect due to limited sources of information available around that time period. He became manager of several Spanish clubs such as Real Unión, Athletic Bilbao, Celta Vigo, Osasuna, Alavés, Real Málaga, Atlético Madrid and Hércules.
