= José Antonio Urreaga =

Spanish footballer (1910–1975)

Personal information
- Full name: José Antonio Urreaga Goldaracena
- Date of birth: 20 April 1910
- Place of birth: Iloilo, Philippines
- Date of death: 5 October 1975 (aged 65)
- Position: Goalkeeper

Senior career*
Years	Team	Apps	(Gls)
1929–1930	Osasuna		
1930–1933	Logroñés		
1933–1936	Osasuna	4	(0)
Total		86	(32)
- * Club domestic league appearances and goals

José Antonio Urreaga Goldaracena (20 April 1910 – 5 October 1975) was a Spanish footballer who played as a goalkeeper for Logroñés and Osasuna in the early 1930s.

== Career ==
Born on 20 April 1910 in Iloilo, Philippines, (Note: The official website of CA Osasuna wrongly claims that he was born in Pamplona.) Urreaga began his career at Osasuna in 1929, aged 19, with whom he played 10 official matches in the 1929–30, all in the Gipuzkoa Championship, although some sources wrongly attribute him a further two matches in the Segunda División in June 1929, which were actually played by Filomeno Urdiroz.

In 1930, Urreaga joined Logroñés, with whom he played for three years, until 1933, when he returned to Osasuna, where he played for a further three years, until 1936, helping his side achieve promotion to the top flight in 1935. On 24 February 1935, in a second division fixture against Sabadell, Urreaga sustained an injury in the 60th minute after falling awkwardly, and even though Osasuna had to play the rest of the match with ten men, they still won 2–0. In total, he played 4 La Liga matches for Osasuna.

The club was hit hard by the rearguard repression following the outbreak of Spanish Civil War, but like so many other Osasuna players, Urreaga did not hesitate to express his political leanings, often boasting about it in the so-called war matches, held to give "signs of normalcy" to the rearguard. During the War, both he and his fellow Osasuna teammate Muguiro were wounded by shrapnel. He ended up as a "deputy director" of Naviera Aznar in Bilbao. He also had at least one daughter, Verónica.

== Death ==
Urreaga died on 5 October 1975, at the age of 65.

== Honours ==
Racing de Santander

- La Liga:
  - Runner-up (1): 1930–31
