= Víctor Muñoz (footballer, born 2003) =

Spanish footballer (born 2003)

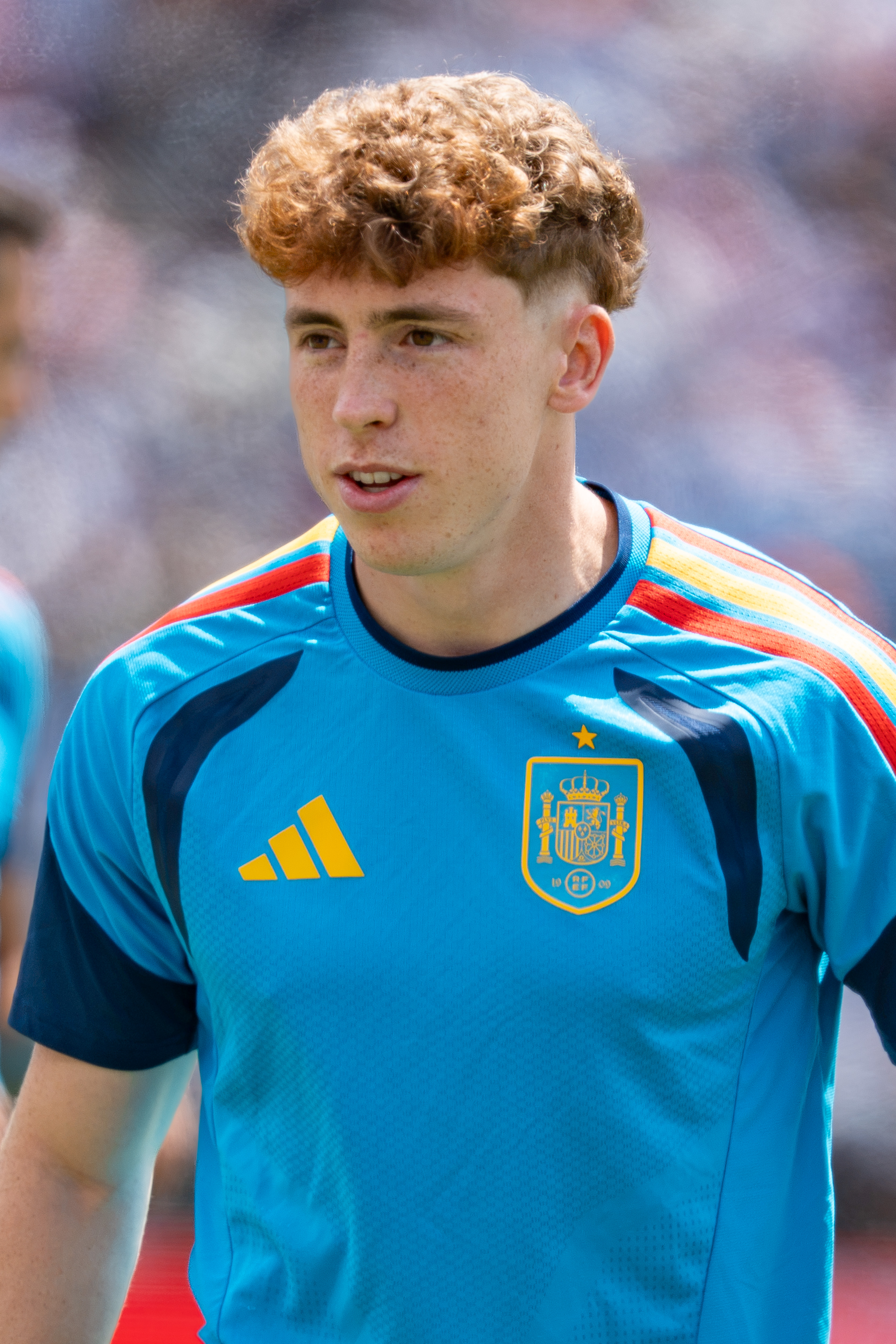
- Muñoz with Spain in 2026

Personal information
- Full name: Víctor Muñoz Villanueva
- Date of birth: 13 July 2003 (age 23)
- Place of birth: Barcelona, Spain
- Height: 1.73 m (5 ft 8 in)
- Position: Winger

Team information
- Current team: Liverpool
- Number: 23

Youth career
- 2012–2014: Sant Gabriel
- 2014–2017: Barcelona
- 2017–2021: Damm
- 2021–2022: Real Madrid

Senior career*
| Years | Team | Apps | (Gls) |
| 2022–2023 | RSC Internacional | 27 | (10) |
| 2023–2025 | Real Madrid B | 63 | (13) |
| 2024–2025 | Real Madrid | 2 | (0) |
| 2025–2026 | Osasuna | 34 | (6) |
| 2026– | Liverpool | 10 | (3) |

International career^{‡}
| 2026– | Spain | 5 | (1) |
Medal record
Men's football
Representing Spain
FIFA World Cup
| Winner | 2026 Canada–Mexico–US |
- * Club domestic league appearances and goals as of 18:28, 22 November 2026 (UTC) ‡ National team caps and goals as of 21:40, 6 October 2026 (UTC)

Víctor Muñoz Villanueva (Note: Spanish pronunciation: [ˈbiktoɾ muˈɲoθ]) (born 13 July 2003) is a Spanish professional footballer who plays as a winger for Premier League club Liverpool and the Spain national team.

== Club career ==
=== Early career ===
Born in Barcelona, Catalonia, Muñoz joined Barcelona's La Masia at the age of eleven, after beginning at Sant Gabriel. In 2017, at the age of fourteen, he left the club and joined the youth academy of Damm.

=== Real Madrid ===
In June 2021, Muñoz joined the youth team of Real Madrid, where he played in the UEFA Youth League. After making his senior debut with farm team RSC Internacional in 2022, he was promoted to the club's reserve team in Primera Federación in the following year.

During the 2024–25 season, Muñoz was regarded to have established himself as a starter for Castilla. On 11 May 2025, he made his La Liga debut, replacing Vinícius Júnior in the 88th minute in a 4–3 defeat against his former side Barcelona.

On 18 June 2025, Muñoz made his FIFA Club World Cup debut in Real Madrid's first match under new head coach Xabi Alonso, coming on in the 80th minute for Vinícius Júnior in a 1–1 draw against Al-Hilal.

=== Osasuna ===
On 11 July 2025, Muñoz signed a five-year contract with fellow La Liga club Osasuna, for a transfer fee of €5 million for 50% of his economic rights, with a further €1 million due in variables. Later that year, on 25 September, he netted his first goal for the club in a 1–1 draw against Elche.

=== Liverpool ===
On 18 June 2026, Muñoz signed for Premier League club Liverpool on a long-term deal worth €40 million, matching his buyout clause. He made his debut for Liverpool in a 2–2 draw with Newcastle United at St James' Park on 23 August, in the club's first game of the 2026–27 Premier League season. On 29 August, he scored his first goal for the club in a 2–2 home draw with Nottingham Forest.

== International career ==
On 27 March 2026, Muñoz made his debut for Spain and scored his side's third goal in a 3–0 friendly victory against Serbia at Estadio de la Ceramica.

On 25 May 2026, Muñoz was selected in Spain's squad for the 2026 FIFA World Cup. He was an unused substitute in all of his country's matches as they went on to win the tournament.

== Style of play ==
Muñoz plays as a winger or forward. American news website The Sporting News wrote in 2024 that "his speed is what makes him stand out the most and made him recently known as the fastest player in the Real Madrid squad".

Muñoz is known to operate as a traditional winger who plays on the left wing. He runs back behind the opposition instead of dropping deep. He is also known to be an attacking threat even without having possession of the ball. His ability to accelerate could also be a deciding factor.

== Career statistics ==
=== Club ===
As of match played 22 November 2026

Appearances and goals by club, season and competition
| Club | Season | League | | | National cup (Note: Includes Copa del Rey, FA Cup) | | League cup (Note: Includes EFL Cup) | | Europe | | Other | | Total | |
| Club | Season | Division | Apps | Goals | Apps | Goals | Apps | Goals | Apps | Goals | Apps | Goals | Apps | Goals |
|---|---|---|---|---|---|---|---|---|---|---|---|---|---|---|
| RSC Internacional | 2022–23 | Tercera Federación | 27 | 10 | — | | — | | — | | 4 (Note: Appearances in Tercera Federación promotion play-offs) | 0 | 31 | 10 |
| Real Madrid Castilla | 2023–24 | Primera Federación | 29 | 2 | — | | — | | — | | — | | 29 | 2 |
| Real Madrid Castilla | 2024–25 | Primera Federación | 34 | 11 | — | | — | | — | | — | | 34 | 11 |
| Real Madrid Castilla | Total | | 63 | 13 | — | | — | | — | | — | | 63 | 13 |
| Real Madrid | 2024–25 | La Liga | 2 | 0 | 0 | 0 | — | | 0 | 0 | 2 (Note: Appearances in FIFA Club World Cup) | 0 | 4 | 0 |
| Osasuna | 2025–26 | La Liga | 34 | 6 | 2 | 1 | — | | — | | — | | 36 | 7 |
| Liverpool | 2026–27 | Premier League | 10 | 3 | 0 | 0 | 0 | 0 | 3 (Note: Appearances in UEFA Champions League) | 0 | — | | 13 | 3 |
| Career total | | | 136 | 32 | 2 | 1 | 0 | 0 | 3 | 0 | 6 | 0 | 147 | 33 |

=== International ===
As of match played 6 October 2026

Appearances and goals by national team and year
| National team | Year | Apps | Goals |
|---|---|---|---|
| Spain | 2026 | 5 | 1 |
| Total | | 5 | 1 |

As of match played 6 October 2026
Spain score listed first, score column indicates score after each Muñoz goal

List of international goals scored by Víctor Muñoz
| No. | Date | Venue | Cap | Opponent | Score | Result | Competition |
|---|---|---|---|---|---|---|---|
| 1 | 27 March 2026 | Estadio de la Cerámica, Villarreal, Spain | 1 | Serbia | 3–0 | 3–0 | Friendly |

== Honours ==
Spain

- FIFA World Cup: 2026

Individual

- La Liga U23 Player of the Month: February 2026, March 2026
