= Rockson Yeboah =

Ghanaian footballer

Personal information
- Full name: Afriyie Yeboah Rockson
- Date of birth: 2 August 2004 (age 22)
- Place of birth: Berekum, Ghana
- Height: 1.90 m (6 ft 3 in)
- Position: Centre-back

Team information
- Current team: Osasuna
- Number: 48

Youth career
- Bec-Tero FC
- Techiman United
- Young African Promises

Senior career*
Years	Team	Apps	(Gls)
2023–2024	Young African Promises		
2023–2024	→ AEK Athens B (loan)	22	(0)
2024–2026	IFK Göteborg	28	(2)
2026–	Osasuna	3	(0)
- * Club domestic league appearances and goals as of 19:32, 19 September 2026 (UTC)

Rockson Yeboah (born 2 August 2004) is a Ghanaian footballer who plays as a centre-back for La Liga club Osasuna.

== Career ==
=== Early career ===
After playing for Ghananian clubs Bec-Tero FC, Techiman United and Young African Promises, Yeboah joined Super League Greece club AEK Athens on a one-year loan in June 2023. He spent his time in AEK Athens in the B team, playing 22 games in the 2023–24 Super League Greece 2.

=== IFK Göteborg ===
On 15 August 2024, Yeboah signed a four-and-a-half-year contract with Allsvenskan club IFK Göteborg. He made his debut in Allsvenskan against Halmstads BK on 23 September 2024, after being substituted in for Paulos Abraham in the 85th minute.

=== Osasuna ===
On 12 August 2026, Yeboah joined La Liga club CA Osasuna, for a reported transfer fee around €3 million, signing a contract until 2031. Göteborg retain a 30% future sell-on clause.
