= Mauro Echegoyen =

Spanish footballer

- Echegoyen playing for Osasuna B in 2025

Personal information
- Full name: Mauro Echegoyen Berrozpe
- Date of birth: 3 March 2005 (age 21)
- Place of birth: Murchante, Spain
- Height: 1.72 m (5 ft 8 in)
- Position: Midfielder

Team information
- Current team: Osasuna
- Number: 26

Youth career
- Murchante
- 2015–2023: Osasuna

Senior career*
Years	Team	Apps	(Gls)
2023–2026	Osasuna B	99	(1)
2025–	Osasuna	1	(0)
- * Club domestic league appearances and goals as of 27 May 2026

Mauro Echegoyen Berrozpe (born 3 March 2005) is a Spanish professional footballer who plays as a midfielder for CA Osasuna.

== Club career ==
Born in Murchante, Navarre, Echegoyen joined CA Osasuna's youth sides in 2015, from hometown side CD Murchante. In 2023, after finishing his formation, he was promoted straight to the reserves in Primera Federación, and made his senior debut on 26 August of that year by starting in a 1–0 home win over UE Cornellà.

After establishing himself as a regular starter for the B-team, Echegoyen made his debut with the main squad on 29 October 2025, starting in a 5–0 away routing of CD Sant Jordi, for the season's Copa del Rey. The following 28 May, he renewed his contract until 2028, and was definitely promoted to the first team in August, after impressing during the pre-season.

Echegoyen made his professional – and La Liga – debut on 11 October 2026, coming on as a second-half substitute for Jon Moncayola in a 5–2 away loss to Real Betis.

== International career ==
On 29 August 2023, Echegoyen was called up to the Spain national under-19 team for a period of trainings.
