= Subiza (town) =

Town in Galar, Navarre, Spain

Coordinates: 42°43′03.8″N 1°40′17.9″W

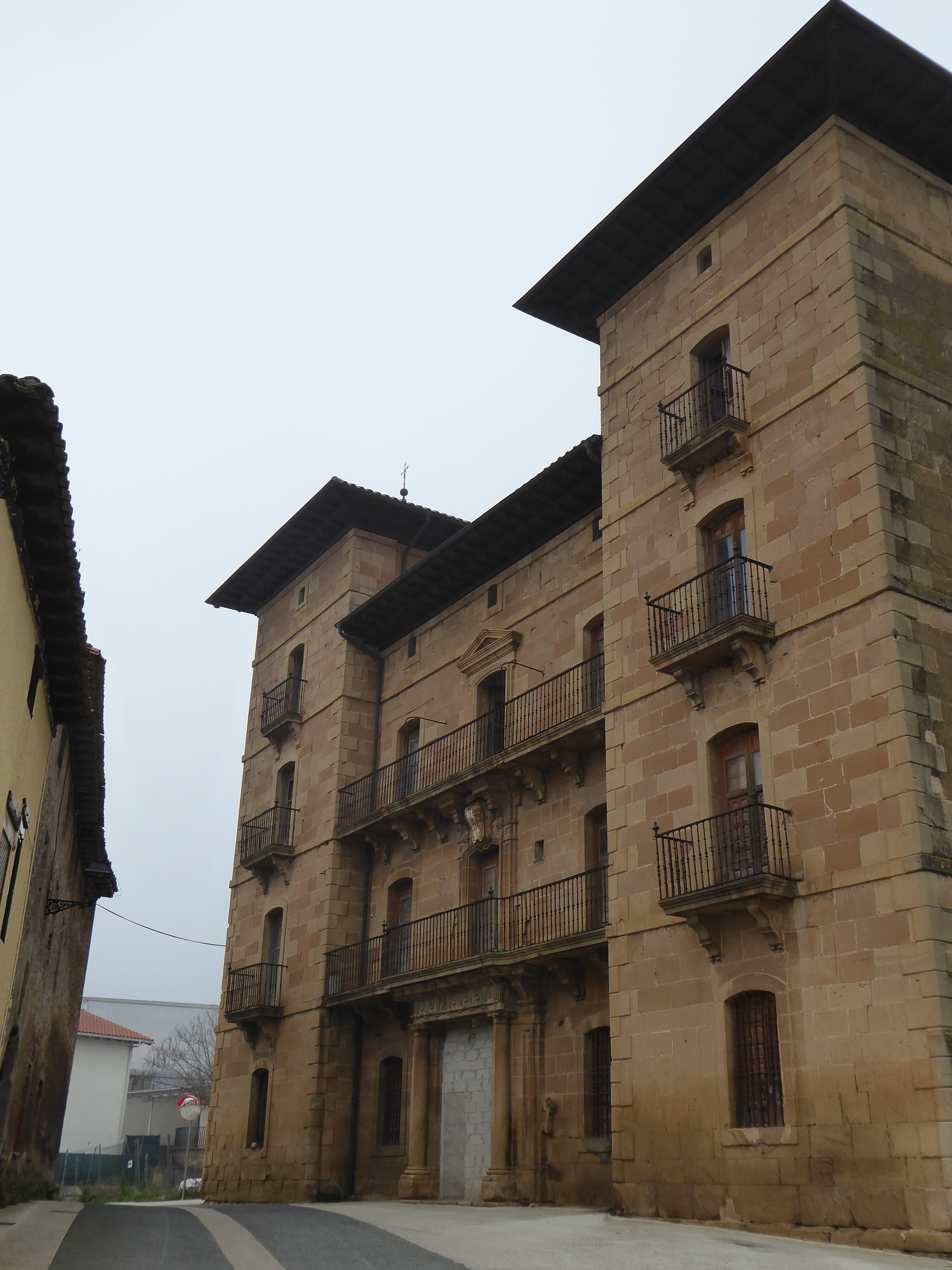
Subiza 20-12-18

Subiza (Basque: Subitza) is a Spanish town located in the province and autonomous community of Navarre, belonging to the municipality of Galar, in northern Spain. Its population in 2014 was of 191 inhabitants (INE).
