= Asier Osambela =

Spanish footballer

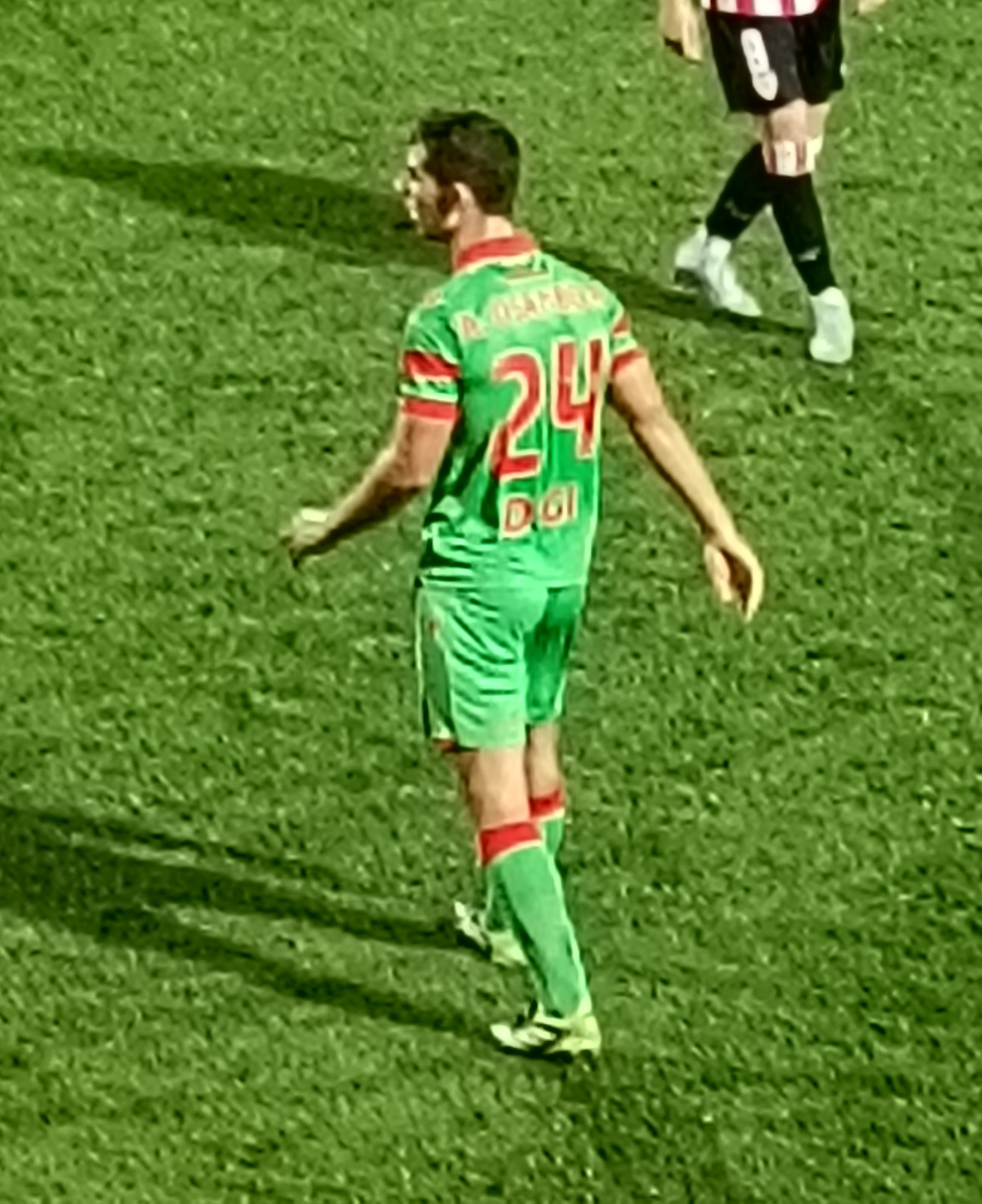
- Osambela playing for Osasuna B in 2025

Personal information
- Full name: Asier Osambela Larraya
- Date of birth: 30 October 2004 (age 22)
- Place of birth: Subiza, Spain
- Height: 1.86 m (6 ft 1 in)
- Position: Midfielder

Team information
- Current team: Osasuna
- Number: 29

Youth career
- Bidezarra
- Ardoi
- 2015–2022: Osasuna

Senior career*
Years	Team	Apps	(Gls)
2022	Subiza	2	(0)
2022–2026	Osasuna B	107	(9)
2024–	Osasuna	18	(1)

International career^{‡}
2026–	Basque Country	1	(0)
- * Club domestic league appearances and goals as of 14 November 2026 ‡ National team caps and goals as of 14 November 2026

Asier Osambela Larraya (born 30 October 2004) is a Spanish professional footballer who plays as a midfielder for CA Osasuna.

== Career ==
Born in Subiza, Galar, Navarre, Osamblea joined CA Osasuna's youth setup in 2015, aged ten, from CF Ardoi FE. He made his senior debut with the reserves on 27 August 2022, coming on as a late substitute in a 0–0 Primera Federación home draw against CD Atlético Baleares.

Osamblea also featured with the farm team CD Subiza during the 2022–23, with the side in Tercera Federación, but was mainly used with the B-side. He scored his first senior goal on 8 January 2023, netting the B's only in a 4–1 away loss to CD Numancia.

On 14 March 2024, Osambela renewed his contract with the Rojillos until 2026. He made his first team – and La Liga – debut on 20 April, replacing Moi Gómez late into a 2–1 away loss to Rayo Vallecano.

Osambela was a key unit for the B's in the following years, and was called up to the first team for the 2025 pre-season, where he featured as a centre-back under new manager Alessio Lisci.
