= Pepe Alzate =

Spanish footballer and manager

Personal information
- Birth name: José Alzate Rivero
- Date of birth: 12 November 1942 (age 83)
- Place of birth: Vejer de la Frontera, Cádiz, Spain

Youth career
- Txantrea
- Osasuna (youth)

Senior career*
Years	Team	Apps	(Gls)
- Sevilla Atlético
- Tudelano
- Calahorra
- Txantrea
–1974	Burladés		

Managerial career
- 1976: Osasuna
- 1976–1977: Calahorra
- 1977–1979: Cantolagua
- 1979–1983: Osasuna
- 1983–1985: Real Betis
- 1985–1986: Las Palmas
- 1987–1988: Tenerife
- * Club domestic league appearances and goals

José Alzate Rivero, better known as Pepe Alzate (born 12 November 1942) was a Spanish footballer, who played for several modest amateur clubs, and later a manager, taking charge over the likes of Osasuna, Real Betis, and Las Palmas in the 1980s.

== Early life ==
Born on 12 November 1942 in Vejer de la Frontera, Cádiz, Alzate was still a child when he settled in Navarre.

== Playing career ==
Alzate began his career in the youth ranks of Txantrea (founded in 1952) and Osasuna, before making his senior debut as an amateur footballer with Sevilla Atlético. He then played in several modest Navarre clubs, such as Tudelano and Calahorra, before returning to Txantrea, and retiring at Burladés in 1974, aged 32.

== Managerial career ==
=== CA Osasuna ===
Shortly after hanging up his boots, Alzate returned to Osasuna, where he was appointed as assistant coach to Luis Ciáurriz, who died at the end of the 1975–76 season, thus forcing Alzate to take over the team with just eight league matches left, winning three and losing five as the team relegated to the Tercera División.

After coaching two Third Division teams in the area, Calahorra and Sangüesa, he returned to Osasuna in 1979, again as assistant coach, but due to bureaucratic problems at the end of the pre-season, the head coach Straten Petkovic was ultimately unable to take charge of Osasuna, who thus placed their trust in Alzate. The first few matches arose some doubts, but following a 6–0 win over Recreativo de Huelva in the second home game of the season, Osasuna gained momentum, conceding only two draws in the 19 matches played in Pamplona, and staying poised to fight for promotion, which was only achieved on the final matchday, on 1 June 1980, in an away match against Real Murcia, an already promoted team, which Osasuna won 1–0, courtesy of a goal from Txuma Rández. This marked the end of a 17-year stint away from the top-flight.

A self-declared fan of English football in the 1980s, Alzate chose the 4-3-3 system, then in vogue, which gave a great playing style to that Osasuna team. His strategy was based on aggressive pressure and constant attacking football, so much so that the rival coach Paquito described them as "Indians" since they "appeared everywhere". This tactic had an underlying psychological rationale, since giving the initiative to the opponent meant devaluing his own players, and likewise, in 1980, Osasuna became the first team to officially have a psychologist: Ignacio Ventura. Thanks to all this, Osasuna stayed comfortably in the top-flight for two seasons between 1980 and 1982, the best period in the club's history since the 1960s. On one occasion, they fell just one goal short of qualifying for the UEFA Cup. In the 1983 season, however, Osasuna only secured survival after beating Barcelona 1–0 on the final matchday, so the club's president Fermín Ezcurra then informed him that he could stay at the club, but only as a technical director, which had a significantly lower contract.

=== Real Betis ===
On 15 June 1983, Alzate was presented as the manager of Real Betis, a position that he held for two years, until 3 March 1985, when he was dismissed following a 2–0 home defeat to Athletic Bilbao, which marked the team's 8th defeat in the last 9 matches, dropping from 4th to 15th in the league table. In his first season at the club, in 1983–84, Betis did not lose a single match at Estadio Benito Villamarín (and only drew twice against Real Sociedad and Barça), finishing fifth in the league and qualifying for the UEFA Cup, but a Copa del Rey defeat to a Second Division side, and a semifinal defeat to Real Valladolid in the 1984 Copa de la Liga hindered the overall season results. On the latter occasion, Alzate was so furious about being heckled by the Valladolid fans while talking to reporters that he punched the glass of the locker room door, which cost him 11 stitches in his arm.

=== Later career ===
After leaving Betis, Alzate coached the likes of Las Palmas (1985–86), also in the top-flight, and Tenerife (1987–88), in the second.

== Manegerial style ==
In an interview in 1983, Alzate stated that he always attempted to instill in his teams that "the whole is above those individualities" describing it as "part of my mentality, of my way of seeing and understanding football". He was also very clear about his commitment to youth development and in his faith in the youth academy, stating that he believed "the future of Spanish football lies in nurturing the youth academy, because finances are increasingly tight, and we need to nurture our homegrown players".

The conceptual foundation of his game was based on three steps: the unity of the team, daily work, and the need to learn to have fun on the field, because "if you enjoyed it, you performed better; if you performed more, you enjoyed it".

== Later life ==
In 2001, Alzate was a professor at the National Coaching School. On 5 January 2011, his son Mikel Alzate died after a long illness at the age of 28.

== Bibliography ==
- Goñi, Joaquín (1984). Navarros (in Spanish). Pamplona: Gráficas Abegi. p. 369. ISBN 84-398-1970-6.
