= Iñigo Arguibide =

Spanish footballer

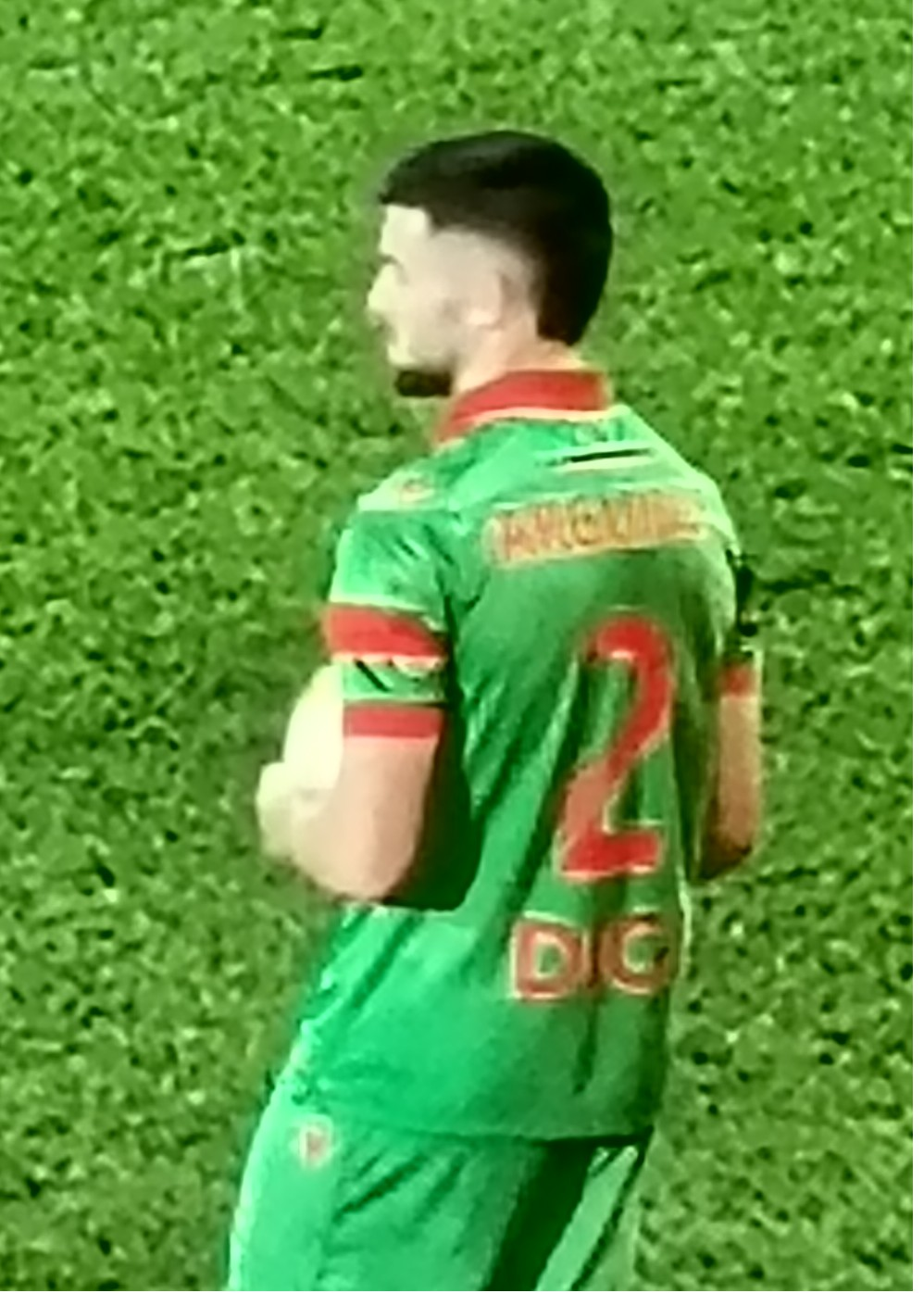
- Arguibide playing for Osasuna B in 2025

Personal information
- Full name: Iñigo Arguibide Goñi
- Date of birth: 19 April 2005 (age 21)
- Place of birth: Huarte, Spain
- Height: 1.78 m (5 ft 10 in)
- Position: Right-back

Team information
- Current team: Osasuna
- Number: 41

Youth career
- Huarte
- Oberena
- Gazte Berriak
- 2021–2023: Osasuna

Senior career*
Years	Team	Apps	(Gls)
2023–	Osasuna B	53	(1)
2024–	Osasuna	7	(0)

International career
2026–	Basque Country	1	(0)
- * Club domestic league appearances and goals as of 27 May 2026

Iñigo Arguibide Goñi (born 19 April 2005) is a Spanish professional footballer who plays for CA Osasuna. Mainly a right-back, he can also play as a right winger.

== Career ==
Born in Huarte, Navarre, Arguibide began his career with hometown side CD Huarte, and subsequently represented the youth sides of CD Oberena and CF Gazte Berriak before joining CA Osasuna's youth setup in 2021; initially a winger, he was converted into a right-back during his progression. He made his senior debut with the reserves on 27 May 2023, starting in a 2–2 Primera Federación away draw against CE Sabadell FC.

Arguibide became a first-choice for the B's in January 2024, after Adama Boiro left for Bilbao Athletic. He made his first team – and La Liga – debut on 25 February 2024, coming on as a second-half substitute for Jesús Areso in a 1–1 draw at UD Las Palmas.
