= Cuqui Bienzobas =

Spanish midfielder

Personal information
- Full name: Anastasio Bienzobas Ocáriz
- Date of birth: May 2, 1913
- Place of birth: San Sebastián, Spain
- Date of death: October 15, 1982 (aged 69)
- Place of death: San Sebastián, Spain
- Position: Central midfielder

Senior career*
Years	Team	Apps	(Gls)
? – 1931	Onena		
1931–1932	Real Sociedad		
1932–1941	CA Osasuna		
1941–1949	Deportivo de La Coruña		
Total		134	(2)

Managerial career
- 1949: Deportivo de La Coruña (coach)
- 1949–1950: UD Orensana
- 1950–1952: CA Osasuna
- 1953–1954: Caudal Deportivo
- 1955–1958: CD Ourense
- 1958–1959: SD Eibar
- 1959–1962: Pontevedra CF
Medal record
1939 Navarre Championship
- * Club domestic league appearances and goals

Anastasio Bienzobas Ocáriz (May 2, 1913 – October 15, 1982), also known as Cuqui Bienzobas, was a Spanish footballer who played as a midfielder. He played for Real Sociedad, CA Osasuna and Deportivo de La Coruña. He was known by his nickname, Cuqui, to distinguish him from his brothers Custodio and Paco, footballers with whom he met at Real Sociedad and Osasuna. After his retirement as a footballer, he was a coach, managing Deportivo de La Coruña, CA Osasuna, SD Eibar and Pontevedra CF.

== Biography ==
Anastasio Bienzobas was born on May 2, 1913 in San Sebastián, Gipuzkoa. was the third brother of the football trio made up of the Bienzobas brothers. After first playing for Onena, he joined Real Sociedad in 1931, a team where his two older brothers Paco and Custodio already played. However, Anastasio Bienzobas did not manage to gain a place in the team and he left the team at the end of the 1931–32 season after having played only 2 official matches with Real Sociedad. He marked his debut in the La Liga (Spanish first division) on March 20, 1932.

Cuqui was about to sign for the Arenas Club de Getxo but the three brothers were transferred together in September 1932 to CA Osasuna that played in the Spanish Second Division. Cuqui was still an amateur player. In Pamplona, Cuqui managed to take a place in the team's midfield. Cuqui Bienzobas was one of the players of the historic Osasuna team that was promoted to the La Liga for the first time in its history in 1935 and was a starter during the Navarrese debut season in the La Liga in the 1935–36 season.

In the 1935–36 season, he became on the most valued center midfielders in Spanish football. Speculation began about the future national career of Cuqui Bienzobas and he was rated at the end of the season as one of the best players in the country at his position. However, national selection did not arrive that season and Osasuna ended the season by being relegated.

The outbreak of the Spanish Civil War in the summer of 1936 surprised Cuqui in a small town in Gipuzkoa, leaving the player in the Republican part of the country. In October 1936, the player was spotted in Bilbao with Amadeo. In 1937, Cuqui appears as part of lineups in several friendly fundraising matches organized by the Basque Government as part of the Gipuzkoa National Team. He was one of the players who volunteered for the formation of the Euskadi National Team, but he was not selected by Travieso so the San Sebastian player did not go on tour abroad with the national team.

Once the war was over, Cuqui rejoined the football club of Osasuna, playing with the Navarrese the first two post-war seasons in the Second Division. At the end of the 1940–41 season, several teams were interested in signing the player from San Sebastián, Deportivo de La Coruña, Valencia CF and Real Sociedad. Finally, Osasuna transferred Cuqui for 100,000 pesetas to Deportivo de La Coruña, a team that was played in the La Liga.

Cuqui was a major player in Deportivo de La Coruña in midfield during the 1940s. He played with the team between 1941 and 1949, participating in the Galician debut in the La Liga in 1941. In those seasons he played 112 games with Deportivo in the La Liga scoring 2 goals. With Deportivo he was fourth in the team's debut season in the First Division (1941–42) and experienced two relegations in 1945 and 1947, as well as two new promotions in 1946 and 1948. In his last season, 1948–49 He did not play in the league. He retired as a footballer at 36 years of age. His career in the La Liga was a total of 134 games and 2 goals.

He died in San Sebastián on October 15, 1982.

== National team selection ==
Cuqui was called up as a substitute player for an international match for the Spain national football team in January 1936, but the San Sebastian player never made his international debut.

== Coaching career ==
In 1949, he obtained the title of national coach in the 1st promotion of the national category coaching course and retired as a footballer. He coached Deportivo de La Coruña in the La Liga during the last three games of the 1948–49 season. He continued this new role with UD Orensana, a debuting team in Spanish Second Division, which he managed to classify in a creditable 7th place. He then went on to coach his former team, CA Osasuna, for 2 consecutive seasons, although he did not manage to promote the Navarrese team to the First Division. He also directed Caudal Deportivo in the 1953–54 season and the beginning of the following season.

He then went on to coach the Deportivo de La Coruña youth team until in 1955, he signed for CD Ourense, a team in the Spanish Third Division that had come to replace the defunct Orensana. Cuqui Bienzobas coached the club for three seasons, qualifying the team on all three occasions to compete in the play-off for promotion to the Second Division, although he was unsuccessful on any of the three occasions. In the 1958–59 season, he coached SD Eibar in the Third Division. In the 1959–60 season, Pontevedra CF hired Cuqui as coach due to his success at Ourense and promoted Pontevedra to La Liga2 (second division). His last club is Pontevedra between 1959 and 1962.

== Other ==
- During the debut of Cuqui Bienzobas in the La Liga on March 20, 1932, the three Bienzobas brothers playing in the ranks of Real Sociedad met on the pitch.
