= Luis Sabalza =

Spanish lawyer and sports executive

Luis Sabalza Iriarte (born 23 October 1947) is a Spanish lawyer and sports executive. He has been the president of CA Osasuna since 2014. During his mandate, the club won promotion to La Liga in 2016 and 2019, the latter as champions of the Segunda División, as well as reaching the 2023 Copa del Rey final and qualifying for the UEFA Conference League in a first European campaign since 2006.

== Biography ==
Born in Sangüesa in Navarre, Sabalza is the eldest of five siblings, is separated, and has three children. He studied at seminary for six years. At 17, he left to work for Fundación Caja Navarra while studying for a law degree via the National University of Distance Education (UNED). He then joined the foundation's legal department, and after taking early retirement he set up his own law firm.

In December 2014, Sabalza was elected as president of newly relegated Segunda División club CA Osasuna, as the only candidate. The club had been under a managerial commission for six months as no candidate stood in the previous two elections after the resignation of Miguel Archanco. Sabalza had since 1998 been part of the legal department of the club. The club was going through a period of high debts.

Osasuna won promotion to La Liga in 2015–16; Sabalza said that the debt situation was no longer "terminal" but still serious. His team were instantly relegated, but returned as champions of the 2018–19 Segunda División, making him the only Osasuna president to win top-flight promotion twice.

Sabalza was re-elected as club president in 2017 and 2021, unopposed. In May 2021, he attended an event led by the Government of Navarre to remember victims of Nationalist reprisals in the Spanish Civil War, including members of Osasuna; this was the first official recognition of the events by Osasuna. In December 2021, he was given the Gold Medal of Navarre by the government, in the name of Osasuna; in his acceptance speech, he again mentioned the victims of reprisals.

In 2022–23, Osasuna finished 7th (a best finish since 2011–12), reached the Copa del Rey final for the first time since 2005, and qualified for the UEFA Conference League for a first European campaign since the 2006–07 UEFA Cup. Sabalza was rewarded with the honour of launching the firework to initiate Pamplona's Festival of San Fermín in July 2023.

In June 2025, Sabalza called another election for the presidency of Osasuna, and confirmed his candidacy.
