= Oroz-Betelu =

Municipality of Spain

Coordinates: 42°54′N 1°18′W

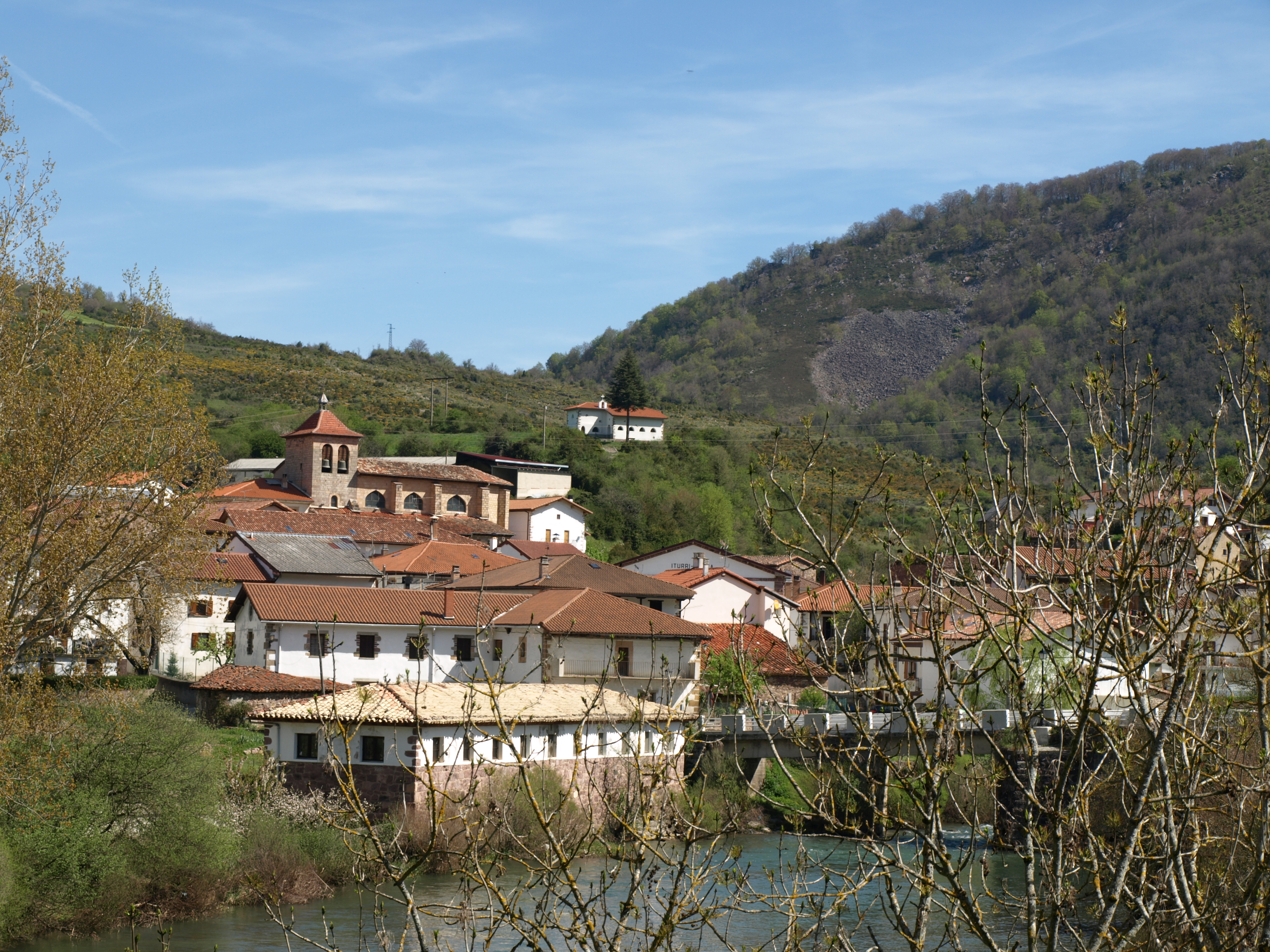
View of Oroz-Betelu

Oroz-Betelu is a town and municipality located in the province and autonomous community of Navarre, northern Spain.
