= Paco Bienzobas =

Spanish footballer (1909–1981)

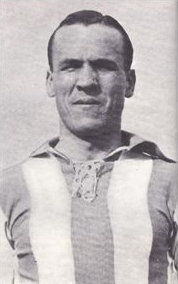

Personal information
- Full name: Francisco Bienzobas Ocáriz
- Date of birth: 26 March 1909
- Place of birth: San Sebastián, Spain
- Date of death: 30 April 1981 (aged 72)
- Place of death: San Sebastián, Spain
- Position: Forward

Youth career
- 1921–1926: Unión San Sebastián

Senior career*
Years	Team	Apps	(Gls)
1926–1934	Real Sociedad	65	(39)
1934–1940	Osasuna	64	(33)
1940–1942	Real Sociedad	26	(14)
Total		155	(86)

International career
1928–1929	Spain	2	(2)

Managerial career
- 1936–1937: Osasuna
- * Club domestic league appearances and goals

Francisco "Paco" Bienzobas Ocáriz (26 March 1909 – 30 April 1981) was a Spanish footballer who played as a forward. Having spent most of his 16-year career with Real Sociedad – 196 official games and 109 goals – he was the first player to be top scorer in La Liga, with 17 goals in 1929.

== Club career ==
Born in San Sebastián, Gipuzkoa, Bienzobas arrived at local Real Sociedad at the age of 17 from amateurs Unión Deportiva de San Sebastián, helping the Basques win the regional championship in his first year. He reached his first Copa del Rey final with the former in 1928, facing FC Barcelona in three games (two 1–1 draws and a 1–3 loss).

In 1929, a national league was created and Real Sociedad participated in La Liga's first edition, finishing fourth out of the ten teams competing. Bienzobas scored 17 goals during the season, being the first top goal scorer in the league; he spent a further four years with the club.

In 1934, Bienzobas joined CA Osasuna, at the time in Segunda División, helping the Navarrese club immediately achieve promotion, only to be being relegated back the next season. The Spanish Civil War put a stop to his career for three years and subsequently he returned to Real Sociedad in 1940, retiring from football at the end of 1941–42 (aged 33) after making only five appearances during the campaign. He amassed Spanish top division totals of 92 games and 50 goals, and overall totals of 196 games and 109 goals for Real Sociedad. He was a penalty specialist, failing to convert only one of 75 spot kicks in his career.

== International career ==
Bienzobas appeared for Spain on two occasions, scoring as many goals. His debut came on 4 June 1928, as the national team lost 1–7 against Italy in the Summer Olympics.

== Coaching and refereeing ==
After his retirement, Bienzobas worked briefly as a manager with Osasuna. In 1942 he began a referee in a spell that would eventually feature him in 48 Spanish top flight games, his debut coming in 1948.

== Personal life ==
Paco Bienzobas had two brothers who were also footballers: the older Custodio, a forward, was a teammate at Real Sociedad for two seasons; the younger Anastasio (Cuqui), a midfielder, also started his career at the Txuriurdin club but became established at Osasuna where he was joined by Paco, and after the Spanish Civil War was a regular in the team at Deportivo La Coruña for most of the 1940s.

He died on 30 April 1981, a day after being informed that Real Sociedad had finally won La Liga for the first time.
