= CA Osasuna =

Spanish football club

Osasuna
- Full name: Club Atlético Osasuna
- Nickname: Gorritxoak / Los Rojillos (The Little Reds)
- Short name: CAO
- Founded: 24 October 1920; 106 years ago
- Stadium: Estadio El Sadar
- Capacity: 23,516
- President: Luis Sabalza
- Head coach: Jagoba Arrasate
- League: La Liga
- 2025–26: La Liga, 17th of 20
- Website: osasuna.es
| Home colours | Away colours | Third colours |

Club Atlético Osasuna (Spanish: [ˈkluβ aðˈletiko osaˈsuna], Osasuna Athletic Club), or simply Osasuna or CAO, is a Spanish professional football club based in Pamplona, Navarre. It was founded on 24 October 1920 and plays in La Liga, the top division of Spanish football. The team's played at El Sadar with the 23,516 capacity.

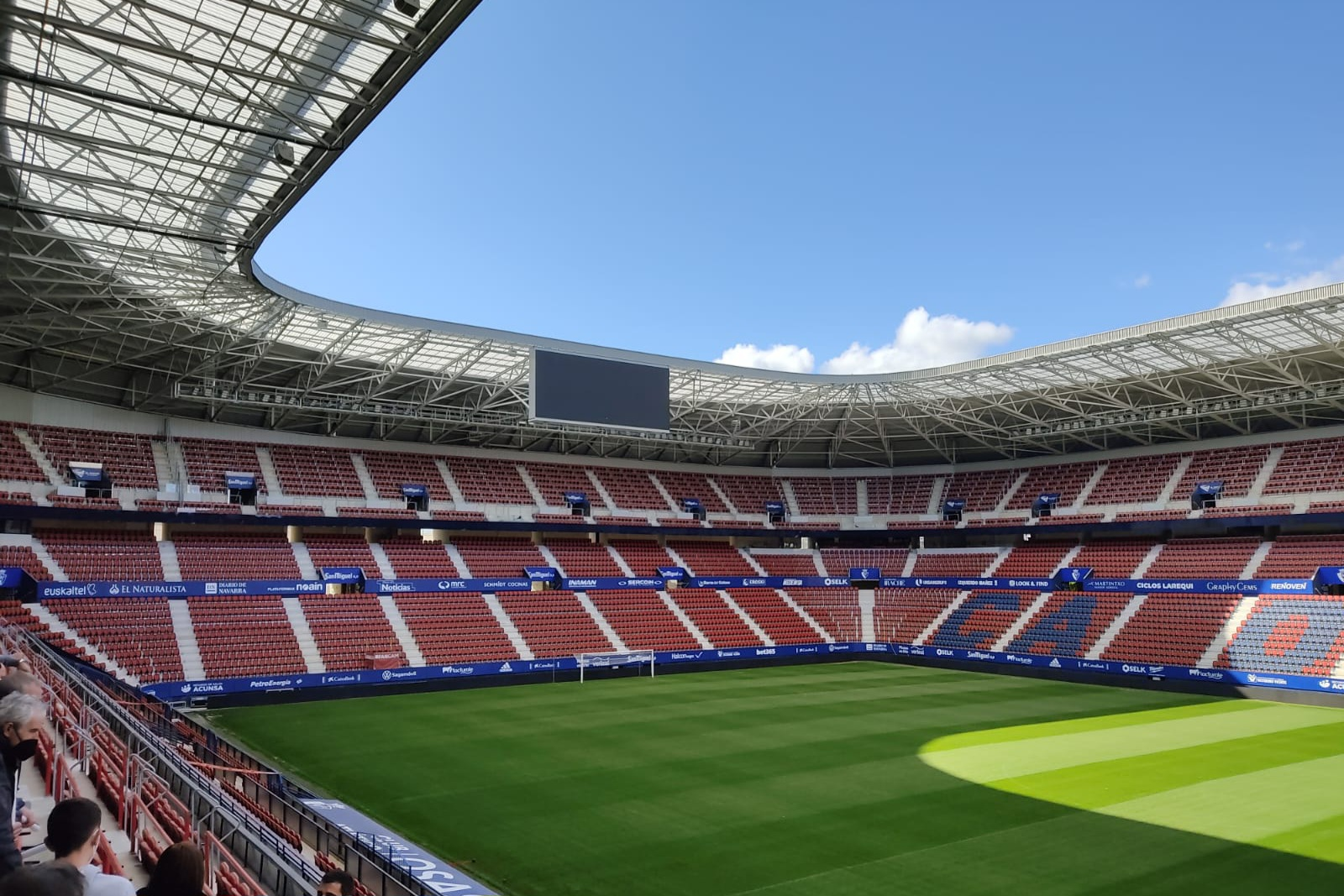
CA Osasuna home stadium's El Sadar.

Osasuna is the sole Navarrese club to have played in La Liga. Although the club has never won a national trophy, it reached the Copa del Rey final in 2005 and 2023. The club's best league finishes were fourth in 1990–91 and 2005–06.

The team's regular home kit is a red shirt with navy blue shorts. "Los Rojillos" or "Gorritxoak" is the club nickname, meaning "The Little Reds". The word "osasuna" means "health" in Basque, used in a sense of "strength" or "vigour", which makes Osasuna the only team in La Liga with a Basque name. Their fiercest rivalry is with Real Zaragoza from the neighboring Aragon province. Secondary rivals include Real Madrid and some of the other Basque clubs, particularly Athletic Bilbao. These two clubs, along with Osasuna and FC Barcelona, are the only four professional clubs in Spain that are not sports corporations; instead they are owned and operated by club members ("bazkide"), who elect the president. The president cannot invest his own money. Like other Basque clubs, Osasuna has produced several successful players through its cantera.

== History ==
The club was founded on 24 October 1920 and its name, Osasuna, meaning health in Basque, was chosen by Benjamín Andoian Martínez. When Spanish football became professional in 1928, Osasuna was placed in the third division, gaining promotion to the Segunda División after the 1931–32 season by winning the playoff against Nacional de Madrid. They made it to La Liga three seasons later. That same season, they reached the semi-finals of the Copa del Rey and lost to Sevilla. The next season, Osasuna reached the semi-finals again, this time losing to Barcelona over two legs, despite grabbing a victory in the first leg.

The club was hit hard by the rearguard repression implemented by the Nationalist rebels in the 1936 coup-de-état against the Spanish Second Republic. At least ten players, employees and directive board members were murdered, imprisoned or otherwise persecuted. The surviving members were forcibly recruited for the front, with some of them showing enthusiasm for the putsch. The strong support of Navarre for the Nationalist rebels led to Osasuna being offered a place in the 1939–40 La Liga when official competitions resumed, although they had finished last in 1935–36 and should have been relegated; ultimately a play-off was arranged with the other demoted team Atlético Aviación – associated with the Spanish Air Force and thus favoured by the military regime. The Madrid team won the tie and, with support from their powerful backers, went on to claim the league title and retain it. It would not be until 1953–54 that Osasuna again participated in the top division, and 1956–57 when they managed to keep their place among the elite, remaining there for three further years.

In September 1967, Osasuna's El Sadar Stadium was opened with a match between Osasuna and Vitoria de Setubal, with the hosts winning 3–0. The club achieved its first ever UEFA Cup qualification in 1985–86 after finishing sixth in the league; their campaign began in the first round, eliminating Scottish club Rangers before being knocked out by Belgian club Waregem 3–2 on aggregate. In the 1990–91 season, Osasuna finished fourth in the league, their best ever league finish until then. This gave them qualification for the following season's UEFA Cup, where the club reached the third round by eliminating Slavia Sofia and Stuttgart. Finishing last in 1993–94, the side spent six years in the second level, before finally being promoted in 1999–2000 after placing 2nd in the league table.

Chart of CA Osasuna league performance 1929–present

In the 2002–03 Copa del Rey, Osasuna reached the semi-finals for the first time since 1988. The team entered the competition in the Round of 64, where they beat Lemona. In the following rounds, they beat Eibar, Real Unión and Sevilla, until the semi-finals where they were knocked out after losing to Recreativo de Huelva 4–2 on aggregate.

In 2005, they reached the Copa del Rey final for the first time, losing to Real Betis after extra time. They had a tough campaign in that season's Copa Del Rey, almost being eliminated in the round of 64 but narrowly beating Segunda División B side Castellón on penalties after a goalless draw. They went on to beat Girona 1–0 in extra time, then Getafe, Sevilla and Atletico Madrid each by just one goal difference on aggregate to get to the final.

On 27 November 2005, Osasuna played their 1,000th game in La Liga. After a stellar 2005–06 domestic campaign, they made history by finishing in fourth place – equalling the best-ever finish – to enter the qualifying phase for the UEFA Champions League in the following season. This achievement was made more dramatic by the suspense that was maintained until the last day of the championship in which Osasuna and Sevilla were both vying for fourth place – both eventually ended the season with the same number of points but Osasuna finished higher due to their head-to-head record. However, they did not make it to the Champions League group phase, after being eliminated by Hamburger SV in the third qualifying round, leaving the Navarrese to compete in the UEFA Cup for the fifth time.

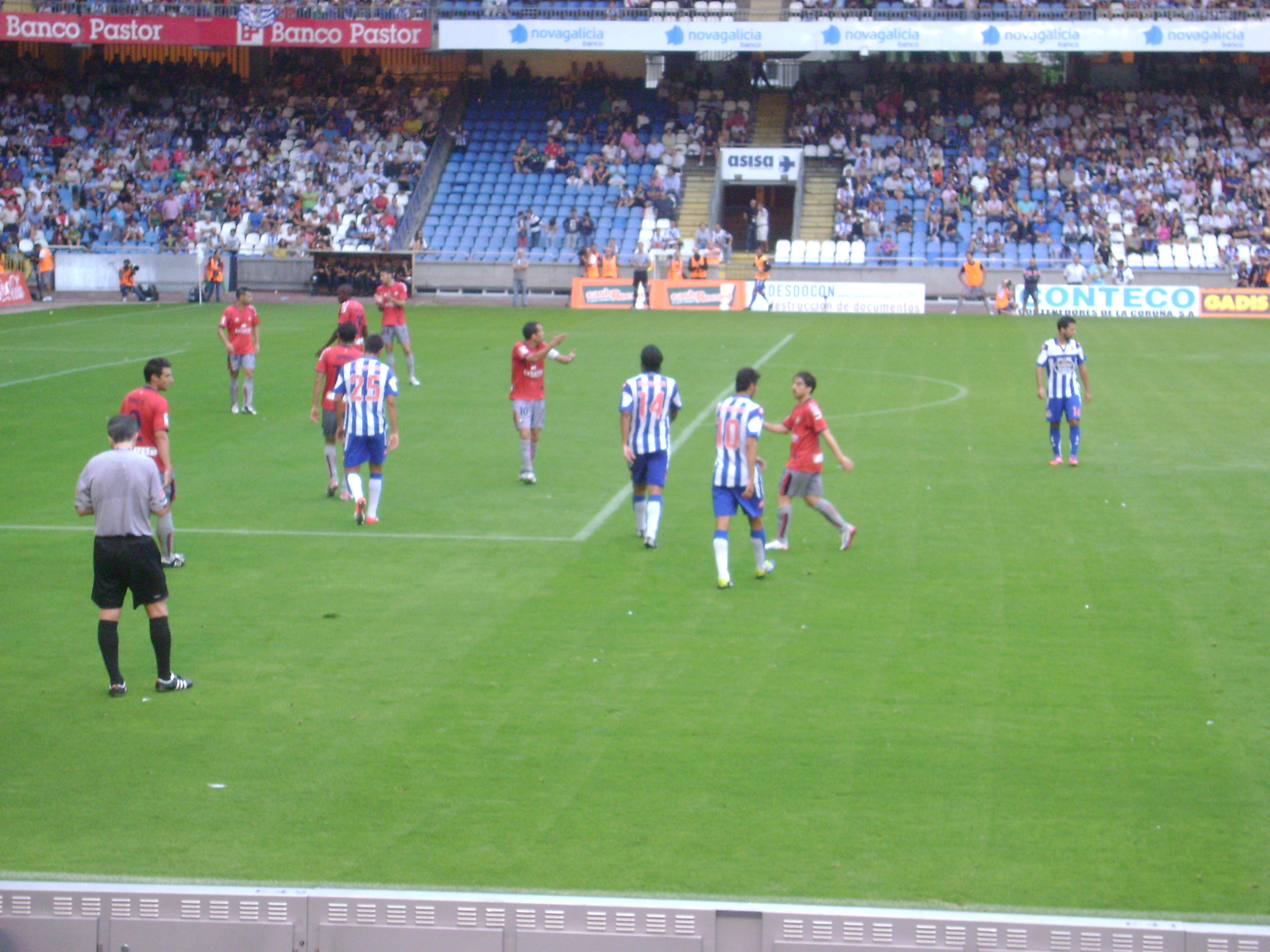
Osasuna playing against Deportivo in 2012

Osasuna were drawn in Group D of the 2006–07 UEFA Cup, and qualified for the knockout stage after finishing second in the group. In the Round of 32, they and were drawn against Bordeaux, progressing 1–0 on aggregate, drawing 0–0 away before winning 1–0 in Pamplona through an extra time winner by Javad Nekounam. Osasuna's next opponent was Rangers, and Osasuna again progressed following a 1–1 draw in Glasgow and a 1–0 win at home. The club was drawn against German side Bayer Leverkusen in the quarter-finals. Regarded as severe underdogs, Osasuna not only progressed to the semi-finals but did so in style (a 3–0 away win had virtually sealed the tie, but the Rojillos also won the second leg, 1–0). In the semi-finals, the club was drawn against holders and fellow Spanish side Sevilla, eventually losing 1–2 on aggregate after a 1–0 home win.

In the following two seasons, Osasuna struggled heavily in the league. In 2007–08, they finished 17th and only one point above relegation. In 2008–09, they only avoided relegation in the final day; being in 18th place and entering the final matchday at home to Real Madrid, the club fell behind but came back with two goals (the decider courtesy of Juanfran, a Merengue youth graduate) to beat 9-men Los Blancos and remain in the top flight by finishing 15th.

Osasuna had great success in 2011–12, finishing seventh and one place away from qualifying for the European places, but struggled again in the next 2 seasons, finishing 16th in 2012–13 and being relegated to the second division after an 18th-place finish in 2013–14. In the 2014–15 season, the club managed to end up one position above the relegation zone. A managerial change resulted in substantial improvement, and Osasuna won the final match of the regular 2015–16 season 0–5 away to Oviedo, finishing sixth in the table and qualifying for promotion playoffs and. They subsequently won all the playoff games – against Gimnàstic de Tarragona in the semi-final and Girona in the final – to achieve promotion to La Liga once again. Osasuna finished 2016–17 in 19th position, resulting in relegation. They could only manage 8th in their first campaign back in the second tier.

On 20 May 2019, Osasuna achieved promotion back to La Liga after Granada's victory over Albacete, mathematically ensuring a promotion place with three matches left in the season. On 31 May, they defeated Córdoba to finish as 2018–19 Segunda División champions.

The club celebrated its centenary in October 2020 with a league victory over Athletic Bilbao, albeit the match was played in an empty stadium owing to restrictions caused by the COVID-19 pandemic in Spain. In May 2021, after decades of silence and alongside other Navarrese institutions, club president Luis Sabalza paid homage for the first time to the members who went through the rearguard Nationalist repression during the Spanish Civil War, on behalf of the board of directors.

In 2023, having qualified on the field for the UEFA Conference League via a 7th-place finish in La Liga (they also reached the 2023 Copa del Rey final, but lost to Real Madrid), Osasuna found itself embroiled in match-fixing allegations dating back to 2013, which led to an initial ban from participating (this being the first occasion they had been eligible for a UEFA competition since the events). The club decided to appeal to the Court of Arbitration for Sport (CAS), who ruled in their favour in deeming that the club was sufficiently distinct from the directors who committed the offences and reinstated their access to the Conference League. UEFA also initiated a disciplinary case against Osasuna for taking the matter to civil courts.

== Kit evolution ==
Red and navy blue are the colours of CA Osasuna, reflected in the home kit and club logo. The away kit tends to differ greatly from the home kit.

2016–2017 away slip

== Rivalries ==
Osasuna has many rivalries: these include Real Zaragoza, Real Madrid, and Athletic Bilbao.

The rivalry with Real Madrid began in December 1990, when Osasuna won 4–0 at the Santiago Bernabéu Stadium. The rivalry with Zaragoza wasn't always a heated rivalry, but hostility between the two clubs began during a match in October 1987, when Zaragoza fans threw an object at Osasuna goalkeeper Roberto Santamaría. Since then, these matches often have altercations between fans and players, and it is known to be one of the most heated rivalries in Spain. In recent years however, there have been large periods of time where this rivalry match wasn't played, due to the clubs being in different divisions.

== Seasons ==
=== Recent seasons ===
| Season | Div | Pos. | Pld | W | D | L | GF | GA | GD | Pts | Cup | Europe | Notes |
|---|---|---|---|---|---|---|---|---|---|---|---|---|---|
| 2013–14 | 1D | 18th | 38 | 10 | 9 | 19 | 32 | 62 | −30 | 39 | Round of 16 | | Relegated |
| 2014–15 | 2D | 18th | 42 | 11 | 12 | 19 | 41 | 60 | −19 | 45 | Second round | | |
| 2015–16 | 2D | 6th | 42 | 17 | 13 | 12 | 47 | 40 | +7 | 64 | Second round | | Promoted as play-off winners |
| 2016–17 | 1D | 19th | 38 | 4 | 10 | 24 | 40 | 94 | −54 | 22 | Round of 16 | | Relegated |
| 2017–18 | 2D | 8th | 42 | 16 | 16 | 10 | 44 | 34 | +10 | 64 | Third round | | |
| 2018–19 | 2D | 1st | 42 | 26 | 9 | 7 | 59 | 35 | +24 | 87 | Second round | | Promoted |
| 2019–20 | 1D | 10th | 38 | 13 | 13 | 12 | 46 | 54 | −8 | 52 | Round of 16 | | |
| 2020–21 | 1D | 11th | 38 | 11 | 11 | 16 | 37 | 48 | −11 | 44 | Round of 16 | | |
| 2021–22 | 1D | 10th | 38 | 12 | 11 | 15 | 37 | 51 | −14 | 47 | Round of 32 | | |
| 2022–23 | 1D | 7th | 38 | 15 | 8 | 15 | 37 | 42 | −5 | 53 | Runners-up | | |
| 2023–24 | 1D | 11th | 38 | 12 | 9 | 17 | 45 | 56 | −11 | 45 | Round of 16 | | |
| 2024–25 | 1D | 9th | 38 | 12 | 16 | 10 | 48 | 52 | −4 | 52 | Quarter-finals | | |
| 2025–26 | 1D | 17th | 38 | 11 | 9 | 18 | 44 | 50 | −6 | 42 | Round of 16 | | |

=== Season to season ===
-

| Season | Tier | Division | Place | Copa del Rey |
|---|---|---|---|---|
| 1929 | 3 | 3ª | 7th | Round of 16 |
| 1929–30 | 4 | 1ª Reg. | 1st | Round of 16 |
| 1930–31 | 3 | 3ª | 3rd | DNP |
| 1931–32 | 3 | 3ª | 1st | Round of 32 |
| 1932–33 | 2 | 2ª | 8th | Round of 16 |
| 1933–34 | 2 | 2ª | 5th | Round of 16 |
| 1934–35 | 2 | 2ª | 1st | Semi-finals |
| 1935–36 | 1 | 1ª | 12th | Semi-finals |
| 1939–40 | 2 | 2ª | 2nd | Round of 16 |
| 1940–41 | 2 | 2ª | 5th | Second round |
| 1941–42 | 2 | 2ª | 6th | First round |
| 1942–43 | 2 | 2ª | 4th | First round |
| 1943–44 | 2 | 2ª | 13th | Round of 32 |
| 1944–45 | 3 | 3ª | 2nd | DNP |
| 1945–46 | 3 | 3ª | 5th | DNP |
| 1946–47 | 3 | 3ª | 2nd | DNP |
| 1947–48 | 3 | 3ª | 1st | Fifth round |
| 1948–49 | 3 | 3ª | 1st | Fourth round |
| 1949–50 | 2 | 2ª | 7th | Second round |
| 1950–51 | 2 | 2ª | 7th | DNP |

| Season | Tier | Division | Place | Copa del Rey |
|---|---|---|---|---|
| 1951–52 | 2 | 2ª | 6th | DNP |
| 1952–53 | 2 | 2ª | 1st | First round |
| 1953–54 | 1 | 1ª | 13th | DNP |
| 1954–55 | 2 | 2ª | 9th | DNP |
| 1955–56 | 2 | 2ª | 1st | Quarter-finals |
| 1956–57 | 1 | 1ª | 6th | Round of 16 |
| 1957–58 | 1 | 1ª | 5th | Round of 16 |
| 1958–59 | 1 | 1ª | 8th | Round of 16 |
| 1959–60 | 1 | 1ª | 15th | Round of 32 |
| 1960–61 | 2 | 2ª | 1st | Round of 32 |
| 1961–62 | 1 | 1ª | 12th | Round of 32 |
| 1962–63 | 1 | 1ª | 15th | Round of 32 |
| 1963–64 | 2 | 2ª | 5th | First round |
| 1964–65 | 2 | 2ª | 10th | Round of 16 |
| 1965–66 | 2 | 2ª | 9th | Round of 32 |
| 1966–67 | 2 | 2ª | 4th | Round of 32 |
| 1967–68 | 2 | 2ª | 15th | First round |
| 1968–69 | 3 | 3ª | 1st | DNP |
| 1969–70 | 2 | 2ª | 15th | Round of 32 |
| 1970–71 | 3 | 3ª | 4th | Round of 32 |

| Season | Tier | Division | Place | Copa del Rey |
|---|---|---|---|---|
| 1971–72 | 3 | 3ª | 1st | First round |
| 1972–73 | 2 | 2ª | 15th | Third round |
| 1973–74 | 2 | 2ª | 17th | Third round |
| 1974–75 | 3 | 3ª | 1st | First round |
| 1975–76 | 2 | 2ª | 19th | Round of 32 |
| 1976–77 | 3 | 3ª | 1st | Second round |
| 1977–78 | 2 | 2ª | 10th | Third round |
| 1978–79 | 2 | 2ª | 13th | Quarter-finals |
| 1979–80 | 2 | 2ª | 3rd | Round of 16 |
| 1980–81 | 1 | 1ª | 11th | First round |
| 1981–82 | 1 | 1ª | 10th | Third round |
| 1982–83 | 1 | 1ª | 14th | Round of 16 |
| 1983–84 | 1 | 1ª | 15th | Quarter-finals |
| 1984–85 | 1 | 1ª | 6th | Third round |
| 1985–86 | 1 | 1ª | 14th | Fourth round |
| 1986–87 | 1 | 1ª | 15th | Quarter-finals |
| 1987–88 | 1 | 1ª | 5th | Semi-finals |
| 1988–89 | 1 | 1ª | 10th | Round of 16 |
| 1989–90 | 1 | 1ª | 8th | First round |
| 1990–91 | 1 | 1ª | 4th | Fourth round |

| Season | Tier | Division | Place | Copa del Rey |
|---|---|---|---|---|
| 1991–92 | 1 | 1ª | 15th | Round of 16 |
| 1992–93 | 1 | 1ª | 10th | Fifth round |
| 1993–94 | 1 | 1ª | 20th | Fifth round |
| 1994–95 | 2 | 2ª | 7th | Third round |
| 1995–96 | 2 | 2ª | 10th | Second round |
| 1996–97 | 2 | 2ª | 16th | Third round |
| 1997–98 | 2 | 2ª | 15th | Round of 16 |
| 1998–99 | 2 | 2ª | 13th | Fourth round |
| 1999–2000 | 2 | 2ª | 2nd | Quarter-finals |
| 2000–01 | 1 | 1ª | 15th | Round of 32 |
| 2001–02 | 1 | 1ª | 17th | Round of 32 |
| 2002–03 | 1 | 1ª | 11th | Semi-finals |
| 2003–04 | 1 | 1ª | 13th | Round of 16 |
| 2004–05 | 1 | 1ª | 15th | Runners-up |
| 2005–06 | 1 | 1ª | 4th | Round of 16 |
| 2006–07 | 1 | 1ª | 14th | Quarter-finals |
| 2007–08 | 1 | 1ª | 17th | Round of 32 |
| 2008–09 | 1 | 1ª | 15th | Round of 16 |
| 2009–10 | 1 | 1ª | 12th | Quarter-finals |
| 2010–11 | 1 | 1ª | 9th | Round of 32 |

| Season | Tier | Division | Place | Copa del Rey |
|---|---|---|---|---|
| 2011–12 | 1 | 1ª | 7th | Round of 16 |
| 2012–13 | 1 | 1ª | 16th | Round of 16 |
| 2013–14 | 1 | 1ª | 18th | Round of 16 |
| 2014–15 | 2 | 2ª | 18th | Second round |
| 2015–16 | 2 | 2ª | 6th | Second round |
| 2016–17 | 1 | 1ª | 19th | Round of 16 |
| 2017–18 | 2 | 2ª | 8th | Third round |
| 2018–19 | 2 | 2ª | 1st | Second round |
| 2019–20 | 1 | 1ª | 10th | Round of 16 |
| 2020–21 | 1 | 1ª | 11th | Round of 16 |
| 2021–22 | 1 | 1ª | 10th | Round of 32 |
| 2022–23 | 1 | 1ª | 7th | Runners-up |
| 2023–24 | 1 | 1ª | 11th | Round of 16 |
| 2024–25 | 1 | 1ª | 9th | Quarter-finals |
| 2025–26 | 1 | 1ª | 17th | Round of 16 |
| 2026–27 | 1 | 1ª | | TBD |

- 45 seasons in La Liga
- 37 seasons in Segunda División
- 13 seasons in Tercera División (as third tier)
- 1 season in Categorías Regionales

== Current squad ==
=== First team squad ===
As of 1 September 2026

Note: Flags indicate national team as defined under FIFA eligibility rules; some limited exceptions apply. Players may hold more than one non-FIFA nationality.

| No. | Pos. | Nation | Player |
|---|---|---|---|
| 1 | GK | ESP | Sergio Herrera (3rd captain) |
| 5 | DF | ESP | Jorge Herrando |
| 6 | MF | ESP | Lucas Torró |
| 7 | MF | ESP | Jon Moncayola |
| 8 | MF | ESP | Iker Muñoz |
| 9 | FW | ESP | Raúl García |
| 10 | MF | ESP | Aimar Oroz |
| 11 | FW | ESP | Kike Barja (captain) |
| 13 | GK | ESP | Aitor Fernández |
| 14 | MF | ESP | Rubén García (vice-captain) |
| 15 | DF | ESP | Diego Rico |
| 16 | MF | ESP | Moi Gómez |

| No. | Pos. | Nation | Player |
|---|---|---|---|
| 17 | FW | CRO | Ante Budimir |
| 18 | FW | ESP | Raúl Moro |
| 19 | DF | FRA | Valentin Rosier |
| 20 | FW | FRA | Romain Del Castillo |
| 21 | MF | BEL | Jonathan Dubasin |
| 22 | DF | CMR | Enzo Boyomo |
| 23 | DF | ESP | Abel Bretones |
| 24 | DF | ESP | Alejandro Catena |
| 26 | MF | ESP | Mauro Echegoyen |
| 27 | DF | ESP | Iñigo Arguibide |
| 29 | MF | ESP | Asier Osambela |
| 48 | DF | GHA | Rockson Yeboah |

=== Reserve team ===
Note: Flags indicate national team as defined under FIFA eligibility rules; some limited exceptions apply. Players may hold more than one non-FIFA nationality.

| No. | Pos. | Nation | Player |
|---|---|---|---|
| 30 | FW | ESP | Asier Bonel |
| 31 | GK | ESP | Rafa Fernández |

| No. | Pos. | Nation | Player |
|---|---|---|---|
| 32 | GK | ESP | Mikel Bermejo |
| 35 | DF | ESP | Unai Santos |

=== Out on loan ===
Note: Flags indicate national team as defined under FIFA eligibility rules; some limited exceptions apply. Players may hold more than one non-FIFA nationality.

| No. | Pos. | Nation | Player |
|---|---|---|---|
| — | GK | GRE | Dimitrios Stamatakis (at Ibiza until 30 June 2027) |
| — | MF | ESP | Anai Morales (at UD Logroñés until 30 June 2027) |

| No. | Pos. | Nation | Player |
|---|---|---|---|
| — | MF | ESP | Miguel Auría (at Mirandés until 30 June 2027) |

== Coaching staff ==
| Position | Staff |
|---|---|
| Head coach | (Spain) Jagoba Arrasate |
| Assistant coach | (Spain) Chema Sanz |
| Technical assistant | (Italy) Gianluca Troilo (Spain) Dario Navarro |
| Delegate | (Spain) Iñaki Ibáñez |
| Analyst | (Spain) Joan García (Spain) Jon Orradre |
| Fitness coach | (Spain) Alberto Ginés |
| Goalkeeping coach | (Spain) Ricardo Sanzol |
| Doctor | (Spain) Andrés Fernández |
| Rehab fitness coach | (Spain) Juantxo Martín |
| Physiotherapist | (Spain) Samu Bueno (Spain) Asier Urkia (Spain) Pablo Suárez (Spain) Iker Carrera (Spain) Unai Miqueleiz |
| Nutritionist | (Spain) Iker Galarza |
| Podiatrist | (Spain) Javier Rada |
| Equipment manager | (Spain) Andrés Ozcoidi (Spain) David Armendáriz |

Last updated: 14 June 2026
Source: CA Osasuna

== Coaching history ==
- (Spain) Joaquín Rasero y Navaz (1920 – 1924)
- (Germany) Walter Gerbart (1924 – 1925)
- (England) Walter Harris (1925 – 1928)
- (Spain) Mariano Sagaseta (1928 – 1930)
- (Spain) Francisco Pagazaurtundúa (1930 – 1931)
- (Spain) Muguiro (1931 – 1932)
- (Spain) Emilio Urdiroz (1932 – 1936)
- (Spain) Paco Bienzobas (1936)
- (Spain) José María Peña (1939 – 1940)
- (Spain) Ramón Urrizalqui (1940 – 1943)
- (Spain) Emilio Urdiroz (2) (1943 – 1944)
- (Spain) Kiko Florenza (1946)
- (Spain) Amadeo Labarta (1946 – 1948)
- (Spain) Martín González Rizo (1 July 1948 – 30 June 1950)
- (Spain) Cuqui Bienzobas (1 July 1950 – 30 June 1952)
- (Spain) Tomás Arnanz (1 July 1952 – 31 December 1954)
- (Spain) Baltasar Albéniz (1 January 1955 – 30 June 1957)
- (Spain) Sabino Barinaga (1 July 1957 – 30 June 1959)
- (Spain) Ignacio Eizaguirre (1 July 1959 – 22 March 1960)
- (Spain) Jesús Salvatierra (22 March – 25 April 1960)
- (Spain) Miguel Gual Agustina (26 April 1960 – 30 June 1962)
- (Spain) Enrique Orizaola (1 July 1962 – 30 June 1963)
- (Spain) Baltasar Albéniz (2) (1 July – 30 November 1963)
- (Spain) Miguel Gual Agustina (2) (1 December 1963 – 28 February 1964)
- (Spain) Luis Aranaz (2 March 1964 – 20 December 1966)
- (Spain) Miguel Blanco (20 December 1965 – June 1966)
- (Spain) García de Andoin (July – October 1966)
- (Spain) Miguel Blanco (2) (October – December 1966)
- (Spain) Julio Martialay (December 1966 – 29 October 1967)
- (Spain) Miguel Blanco (3) (4 November 1967 – 13 January 1968)
- (Spain) Casimiro Benavente (20 January – 30 June 1968)
- (Spain) Juan Ochoantezana (1 July 1968 – 30 June 1970)
- (Spain) Baltasar Albéniz (3) (1 July 1970 – 30 June 1971)
- (Spain) Pedro Eguiluz (1 July 1971 – 30 June 1972)
- (Spain) Moruca (1 July 1972 – 4 November 1973)
- (Spain) Antonio Barrios (25 November 1973 – 10 March 1974)
- (Spain) Luis Ciaurriz (16 March 1974 – 11 April 1976)
- (Spain) Pepe Alzate (18 April – 30 June 1976)
- (Spain) Pachín (1 July 1976 – 30 June 1977)
- (Spain) García Verdugo (1 July 1977 – 30 June 1979)
- (Spain) Pepe Alzate (2) (1 July 1979 – 15 June 1983)
- (Socialist Federal Republic of Yugoslavia) Ivica Brzić (1 July 1983 – 27 October 1986)
- (Spain) Pedro María Zabalza (29 October 1986 – 20 December 1993)
- (Spain) Enrique Martín (20 December 1993 – 30 June 1994)
- (Spain) Txetxu Rojo (1 July 1994 – 12 March 1995)
- (Spain) Manuel Andrés Los Arcos (13 March – 30 June 1995)
- (Spain) Paquito García (1 July 1995 – 30 June 1996)
- (Spain) Rafael Benítez (1 July – 4 November 1996)
- (Spain) Pedro María Zabalza (2) (4 November 1996 – 3 March 1997)
- (Spain) Miguel Sola (3 March – 5 May 1997)
- (Spain) Enrique Martín (2) (5 May 1997 – 1999)
- (Spain) Miguel Ángel Lotina (1999 – 2002)
- (Mexico) Javier Aguirre (1 July 2002 – 24 May 2006)
- (Spain) Cuco Ziganda (29 May 2006 – 13 October 2008)
- (Spain) José Antonio Camacho (13 October 2008 – 14 February 2011)
- (Spain) José Luis Mendilibar (14 February 2011 – 3 September 2013)
- (Spain) Javi Gracia (4 September 2013 – 21 May 2014)
- (Poland) Jan Urban (3 July 2014 – 28 February 2015)
- (Spain) José Manuel Mateo (28 February – 4 May 2015)
- (Spain) Enrique Martín (3) (5 May 2015 – 7 November 2016)
- (Spain) Joaquín Caparrós (8 November 2016 – 5 January 2017)
- (Serbia) Petar Vasiljević (5 January – 7 June 2017)
- (Spain) Diego Martínez (7 June 2017 – 7 June 2018)
- (Spain) Jagoba Arrasate (20 June 2018 – 30 June 2024)
- (Spain) Vicente Moreno (1 July 2024 – 30 June 2025)
- (Italy) Alessio Lisci (1 July 2025 – 25 May 2026)
- (Spain) Luis Miguel Ramis (10 June 2026 – 12 October 2026)
- (Spain) Jagoba Arrasate (2) (12 October 2026 – present)

== Honours ==
- Copa del Rey
  - Runners-up (2): 2004–05, 2022–23
- Copa Presidente FEF
  - Runners-up (1): 1939–40
- Segunda División
  - Winners (4): 1952–53, 1955–56, 1960–61, 2018–19
  - Runners-up (2): 1934-35, 1999-00
- Tercera División
  - Winners (7): 1931–32, 1947–48, 1948–49, 1968–69, 1971–72, 1974–75, 1976–77

== Notable players ==
Note: this list includes players that have appeared in at least 100 league games, have reached international status, or both.

- (Argentina) Daniel Montenegro
- (Argentina) Bernardo Romeo
- (Australia) John Aloisi
- (Cape Verde) Dady
- (Chile) Pablo Contreras
- (Chile) Rafael Olarra
- (Croatia) Ante Budimir
- (Czech Republic) Jaroslav Plašil
- (England) Sammy Lee
- (Hungary) Krisztián Vadócz
- (Iran) Karim Ansarifard
- (Iran) Javad Nekounam
- (Iran) Masoud Shojaei
- (Republic of Ireland) Ashley Grimes
- (Republic of Ireland) Michael Robinson
- (Ivory Coast) Ibrahima Bakayoko
- (Ivory Coast) Christian Manfredini
- (Mexico) Javier Aguirre
- (Mexico) Carlos Ochoa
- (Mexico) Carlos Vela
- (Mexico) Manuel Vidrio
- (Morocco) Moha
- (Morocco) Ez Abde
- (Nigeria) Emeka Ifejiagwa
- (Poland) Roman Kosecki
- (Poland) Ryszard Staniek
- (Poland) Mirosław Trzeciak
- (Poland) Jan Urban
- (Poland) Jacek Ziober
- (Romania) Ionel Gane
- (Russia) Dmitri Kuznetsov
- (Russia) Sergey Shustikov
- (Serbia) Darko Brašanac
- (Serbia) Dejan Lekić
- (Serbia) Dejan Marković
- (Serbia) Savo Milošević
- (Serbia) Predrag Spasić
- (Serbia) Goran Stevanović
- (Serbia) Petar Vasiljević
- (Serbia) Risto Vidaković
- (Spain) César Azpilicueta
- (Spain) Paco Bienzobas
- (Spain) Eugenio Bustingorri
- (Spain) Javier Castañeda
- (Spain) Thomas Christiansen
- (Spain) César Cruchaga
- (Spain) Martín Domínguez
- (Spain) Ignacio Eizaguirre
- (Spain) Miguel Flaño
- (Spain) Josep Maria Fusté
- (Spain) Andoni Goikoetxea
- (Spain) Martín González
- (Spain) José Izquierdo
- (Spain) Josetxo
- (Spain) Javi García
- (Spain) Roberto Soldado
- (Spain) Raúl García
- (Spain) Domingo Larrainzar
- (Spain) Iñigo Larrainzar
- (Spain) Javier López Vallejo
- (Spain) Enrique Martín
- (Spain) Javi Martínez
- (Spain) José Manuel Mateo
- (Spain) Mikel Merino
- (Spain) Nacho Monreal
- (Spain) Víctor Muñoz
- (Spain) Pablo Orbaiz
- (Spain) Pachín
- (Spain) Pepín
- (Spain) Francisco Puñal
- (Spain) Tiko
- (Spain) Ignacio Zoco
- (Uruguay) Pablo García
- (Uruguay) Richard Morales
- (Uruguay) Walter Pandiani
- (Uruguay) Marcelo Sosa

=== World Cup players ===
The following players have been selected by their country in the World Cup Finals, while playing for Osasuna.

- (Serbia and Montenegro) Savo Milošević (2006)
- (Chile) Francisco Silva (2014)
- (Iran) Javad Nekounam (2006, 2014)
- (Croatia) Ante Budimir (2022, 2026)
- (Morocco) Ez Abde (2022)
- (Spain) Víctor Muñoz (2026)

== Notable coaches ==
- (Mexico) Javier Aguirre
- (Poland) Jan Urban
- (Serbia) Ivica Brzić
- (Spain) Rafael Benítez
- (Spain) José Antonio Camacho
- (Spain) Miguel Ángel Lotina
- (Spain) José Luis Mendilibar
- (Spain) José Ángel Ziganda
- (Spain) Jagoba Arrasate

== See also ==
- CA Osasuna B – Osasuna's B team in Segunda División B
- CD Subiza – affiliated team in Tercera División RFEF
- CA Osasuna cantera – youth system up to 19 years, in leagues including División de Honor Juvenil
- Xota FS – affiliated futsal club
- Corruption in Navarre
