= 2019–20 CA Osasuna season =

Osasuna
2019–20 season
- President: Luis Sabalza
- Head coach: Jagoba Arrasate
- Stadium: El Sadar
- La Liga: 10th
- Copa del Rey: Round of 16
- Top goalscorer: League: Chimy Ávila (9); All: Chimy Ávila (11)
- Highest home attendance: 17,000 (vs Real Madrid, 9 February 2020)
- Lowest home attendance: 13,993 (vs Eibar, 24 August 2019)
- Average home league attendance: 15,614
- Biggest win: Lorca Deportiva 0–3 Osasuna
- Biggest defeat: Osasuna 0–5 Atlético Madrid
Home colours	Away colours	Third colours

The 2019–20 season was Club Atlético Osasuna's 89th season in existence and the club's most recent season in the top flight of Spanish football. In addition to the domestic league, Osasuna participated in this season's edition of the Copa del Rey. The season was slated to cover a period from 1 July 2019 to 30 June 2020. It was extended extraordinarily beyond 30 June due to the COVID-19 pandemic in Spain.

== Players ==
=== Current squad ===
As of 30 January 2020

Note: Flags indicate national team as defined under FIFA eligibility rules; some limited exceptions apply. Players may hold more than one non-FIFA nationality.

No.	Pos.	Nation	Player
1	GK	ESP	Sergio Herrera
2	DF	ESP	Nacho Vidal
3	DF	ESP	Raúl Navas (on loan from Real Sociedad)
4	DF	ESP	Unai García
5	DF	ESP	David García
6	DF	ESP	Oier (Captain)
7	FW	ESP	Marc Cardona
8	MF	ESP	Fran Mérida (3rd captain)
9	FW	ARG	Chimy Ávila
10	MF	ESP	Roberto Torres (2nd captain)
11	FW	ESP	Enric Gallego (on loan from Getafe)
12	DF	ARG	Facundo Roncaglia
13	GK	ESP	Rubén Martínez
14	MF	ESP	Rubén García

No.	Pos.	Nation	Player
15	DF	ESP	Toni Lato (on loan from Valencia)
17	MF	ESP	Rober
18	FW	ESP	Juan Villar
19	MF	ESP	Kike Barja
20	MF	SRB	Darko Brašanac
21	MF	ESP	Iñigo Pérez
22	FW	ESP	Adrián
23	DF	ESP	Aridane
26	GK	ESP	Juan Pérez
27	MF	ESP	Jon Moncayola
29	DF	ESP	Endika Irigoien
30	DF	ECU	Pervis Estupiñán (on loan from Watford)
—	MF	ESP	José Arnaiz (on loan from Leganés)

=== Out on loan ===
Note: Flags indicate national team as defined under FIFA eligibility rules; some limited exceptions apply. Players may hold more than one non-FIFA nationality.

No.	Pos.	Nation	Player
—	MF	ESP	Luis Perea (on loan at Alcorcón until 30 June 2020)
—	MF	ESP	Jaume Grau (on loan at Lugo until 30 June 2020)

No.	Pos.	Nation	Player
—	MF	ESP	Antonio Otegui (on loan at Numancia until 30 June 2020)
—	FW	ESP	Brandon (on loan at Girona until 30 June 2020)

== Transfers ==
=== In ===
Date	Player	From	Type	Fee	Ref
30 June 2019	(Spain) Miguel Díaz	Murcia	Loan return		
30 June 2019	(Spain) Imanol García	Gimnàstic	Loan return		
30 June 2019	(Spain) Antonio Otegui	Melilla	Loan return		
30 June 2019	(Spain) David Rodríguez	Numancia	Loan return		
1 July 2019	(Spain) Marc Cardona	Barcelona B	Transfer	€2.5M	
1 July 2019	(Spain) Brandon	(France) Rennes	Buyout clause	€2M	
1 July 2019	(Argentina) Chimy Ávila	(Argentina) San Lorenzo	Transfer	€2.7M	
3 July 2019	(Ecuador) Pervis Estupiñán	(England) Watford	Loan		
9 July 2019	(Spain) Jaume Grau	Real Madrid Castilla	Transfer	Free	
22 July 2019	(Serbia) Darko Brašanac	Real Betis	Transfer	Undisclosed	
30 July 2019	(Spain) Adrián López	(Portugal) Porto	Transfer	Free	
8 August 2019	(Argentina) Facundo Roncaglia	Celta Vigo	Transfer	€250K	
12 August 2019	(Spain) Robert Ibáñez	Getafe	Transfer	€2M	
14 August 2019	(Spain) Raúl Navas	Real Sociedad	Loan		

=== Out ===
Date	Player	To	Type	Fee	Ref
30 June 2019	(Spain) Robert Ibáñez	Getafe	Loan return		
1 July 2019	(Spain) Carlos Clerc	Levante	Transfer	Free	
7 July 2019	(Spain) Miguel Díaz	Tudelano	Transfer	Free	
9 July 2019	(Spain) Jaume Grau	Lugo	Loan		
19 July 2019	(Spain) Imanol García	Córdoba	Transfer	Free	
20 August 2019	(Spain) David Rodríguez	Racing Santander	Transfer	Free	
27 August 2019	(Spain) Antonio Otegui	Numancia	Loan		

== Pre-season and friendlies ==
Win Draw Loss

24 July 2019 Friendly	Amorebieta	2–5	Osasuna	Amorebieta-Etxano, Spain
19:30 CEST (UTC+2)	Aldalur 20'; Zenitagoia 60'	Report	Villar 44'; Torres 47' (pen.); Mérida 65'; Aridane 86'; Cardona 89'	Stadium: Campo Municipal de Urritxe; Attendance: 1,000; Referee: Ekaitz García Arriola

27 July 2019 Friendly	Numancia	3–1	Osasuna	Ólvega, Spain
19:00 CEST (UTC+2)	Escassi 45'; Guillermo 54', 81'	Report	Villar 61'	Stadium: Campo de Fútbol Ólvega; Attendance: 2,000; Referee: Marcos Latorre

3 August 2019 Friendly	NEC	0–1	Osasuna	Nijmegen, Netherlands
18:00 CEST (UTC+2)		Report	Cardona 28'	Stadium: Stadion de Goffert; Attendance: 2,500; Referee: Clay Ruperti (Netherlands)

4 August 2019 Friendly	De Graafschap	1–2	Osasuna	Doetinchem, Netherlands
17:00 CEST (UTC+2)	Seuntjens 82'	Report	Ávila 41'; Calvillo 55'	Stadium: De Vijverberg; Attendance: 3,000

8 August 2019 Friendly	Osasuna	0–0	Eibar	Tafalla, Spain
19:30 CEST (UTC+2)				Stadium: Campo de San Francisco; Referee: Imanol Irurtzun

9 August 2019 Friendly	Real Sociedad	2–0	Osasuna	Irun, Spain
19:30 CEST (UTC+2)	Oyarzabal 48'; Portu 70'			Stadium: Stadium Gal

4 September 2019 Friendly	Recreativo de Huelva	0–1	Osasuna	Huelva, Spain
21:00 CEST (UTC+2)	Jiménez (yellow card) 29'		Adrián 80'	Stadium: Estadio Nuevo Colombino

10 October 2019 Friendly	Osasuna	0–0	Real Sociedad	Pamplona, Spain
11:00 CEST (UTC+2)				Stadium: Tajonar Facilities Stadium; Referee: Recio Moreno

14 November 2019 Friendly	Real Sociedad	0–1	Osasuna	Zubieta, Spain
11:00 CET (UTC+1)		Report	I. Pérez 50'	Stadium: Campo José Luis Orbegozo; Attendance: 700; Referee: Nacho Díaz

== Competitions ==
=== Overview ===
Competition	First match	Last match	Starting round	Final position	Record							
Competition	First match	Last match	Starting round	Final position	Pld	W	D	L	GF	GA	GD	Win %
La Liga	17 August 2019	19 July 2020	Matchday 1	10th	38	13	13	12	46	54	−8	34.21
Copa del Rey	19 December 2019	29 January 2020	First round	Round of 16	4	3	0	1	9	6	+3	75.00
Total					42	16	13	13	55	60	−5	38.10

Last updated: 19 July 2020
Source: Soccerway

=== La Liga ===
==== League table ====
Pos	Team	Pld	W	D	L	GF	GA	GD	Pts
8	Getafe	38	14	12	12	43	37	+6	54
9	Valencia	38	14	11	13	46	53	−7	53
10	Osasuna	38	13	13	12	46	54	−8	52
11	Athletic Bilbao	38	13	12	13	41	38	+3	51
12	Levante	38	14	7	17	47	53	−6	49

Source: La Liga, Soccerway
Rules for classification: 1) Points; 2) Head-to-head points; 3) Head-to-head goal difference; 4) Goal difference; 5) Goals scored; 6) Fair-play points (Note: Head-to-head record is used only after all the matches between the teams in question have been played)

==== Results summary ====
Overall								Home						Away					
Pld	W	D	L	GF	GA	GD	Pts	W	D	L	GF	GA	GD	W	D	L	GF	GA	GD
38	13	13	12	46	54	−8	52	7	7	5	26	29	−3	6	6	7	20	25	−5

Last updated: 19 July 2020.
Source: La Liga

==== Results by round ====
Round	1	2	3	4	5	6	7	8	9	10	11	12	13	14	15	16	17	18	19	20	21	22	23	24	25	26	27	28	29	30	31	32	33	34	35	36	37	38
Ground	A	H	H	A	H	A	A	H	A	H	A	H	A	H	A	H	A	H	A	H	H	A	H	A	H	A	H	A	H	A	A	H	A	H	A	H	A	H
Result	W	D	D	D	D	L	D	W	L	W	D	W	D	L	W	D	L	L	D	D	W	L	L	W	L	L	W	D	L	L	W	W	W	D	L	W	W	D
Position	7	7	6	9	10	12	13	11	13	8	10	9	10	11	9	10	10	12	12	13	10	11	12	11	12	12	11	11	11	12	11	11	11	11	11	11	11	10

Updated to match(es) played on 19 July 2020. Source: La Liga
A = Away; H = Home; W = Win; D = Draw; L = Loss

==== Matches ====
The La Liga schedule was announced on 4 July 2019.

17 August 2019 1	Leganés	0–1	Osasuna	Leganés
21:00 CEST (UTC+2)	Recio (yellow card) 73'; Óscar (red card) 90+3'	Report	Torres (yellow card) 17'; Ávila (yellow card) 35', (goal) 75'; Rober (yellow card) 45+1'; Moncayola (yellow card) 65'	Stadium: Estadio Municipal de Butarque; Attendance: 10,058; Referee: Javier Alberola Rojas

24 August 2019 2	Osasuna	0–0	Eibar	Pamplona
17:00 CEST (UTC+2)	Vidal (yellow card) 11'; Ávila (yellow card) 16'; García (yellow card) 30'; Brašanac (yellow card) 83'	Report	Álvarez (yellow card) 23'; Arbilla (yellow card) 45+2'; Oliveira (yellow card) 65'; Charles (yellow card) 90'	Stadium: El Sadar; Attendance: 13,993; Referee: David Medié Jiménez

31 August 2019 3	Osasuna	2–2	Barcelona	Pamplona
17:00 CEST (UTC+2)	Torres 7', 81' (pen.); Mérida (yellow card) 13'; Brandon (yellow card) 43'; Moncayola (yellow card) 90+1'	Report	Roberto (yellow card) 32'; De Jong (yellow card) 37'; Fati 51'; Arthur 64'; Piqué (yellow card) 82'; Lenglet (yellow card) 90+4'	Stadium: El Sadar; Attendance: 16,764; Referee: Juan Martínez Munuera

15 September 2019 4	Valladolid	1–1	Osasuna	Valladolid
18:30 CEST (UTC+2)	Hervías 65'	Report	Mérida (yellow card) 77'; Rober 81'	Stadium: José Zorrilla; Attendance: 20,705; Referee: José Luis Munuera Montero

20 September 2019 5	Osasuna	0–0	Real Betis	Pamplona
21:00 CEST (UTC+2)	Sanjurjo (yellow card) 9'	Report	Mandi (yellow card) 4'; Guardado (yellow card) 24'	Stadium: El Sadar; Attendance: 15,569; Referee: Carlos del Cerro Grande

25 September 2019 6	Real Madrid	2–0	Osasuna	Madrid
21:00 CEST (UTC+2)	Militão (yellow card) 10'; Vinícius 36'; Nacho (yellow card) 57'; Rodrygo 72'	Report	Lillo (yellow card) 41'; Ávila (yellow card) 80'	Stadium: Santiago Bernabéu; Attendance: 57,589; Referee: Antonio Mateu Lahoz

29 September 2019 7	Levante	1–1	Osasuna	Valencia
18:30 CEST (UTC+2)	Hernâni 4', (yellow card) 18' (yellow-red card) 72'; Roger (yellow card) 61'; Radoja (yellow card) 82'; Fernández (yellow card) 84'; León (yellow card) 90'	Report	R. García 57'	Stadium: Estadi Ciutat de València; Attendance: 19,362; Referee: César Soto Grado

5 October 2019 8	Osasuna	2–1	Villarreal	Pamplona
21:00 CEST (UTC+2)	Vidal (yellow card) 13'; Roncaglia 46'; Oier (yellow card) 70'; Ávila 79'	Report	Torres 5'; Albiol (yellow card) 67'; Bacca (yellow card) 90+2'	Stadium: El Sadar; Attendance: 15,415; Referee: Valentín Pizarro Gómez

18 October 2019 9	Granada	1–0	Osasuna	Granada
21:00 CEST (UTC+2)	Fernández (yellow card) 27'; Duarte 38'; Martínez (yellow card) 66'	Report	Estupiñán (yellow card) 12'; Brandon (yellow card) 25'; Ávila (yellow card) 40'; Oier (yellow card) 54'; Aridane (yellow card) 78'; Moncayola (yellow card) 90'; Mérida (yellow card) 90+2' (yellow-red card) 90+2'	Stadium: Nuevo Estadio de Los Cármenes; Attendance: 16,986; Referee: Xavier Estrada Fernández

27 October 2019 10	Osasuna	3–1	Valencia	Pamplona
21:00 CET (UTC+1)	Oier 34', (yellow card) 55'; R. García 48'; Estupiñán 80'	Report	Rodrigo 14', (red card) 29'; Cheryshev (yellow card) 42'	Stadium: El Sadar; Attendance: 14,976; Referee: Santiago Jaime Latre

31 October 2019 11	Mallorca	2–2	Osasuna	Palma
19:00 CET (UTC+1)	Junior 21' (pen.); Baba (yellow card) 55'; Sevilla 73' (pen.)	Report	Brandon (yellow card) 15'; Estupiñán (yellow card) 34'; D. García (yellow card) 53'; Aridane (yellow card) 63'; Cardona 69'; Roncaglia (yellow card) 75'; R. García 77'	Stadium: Estadi de Son Moix; Attendance: 12,641; Referee: Adrián Cordero Vega

3 November 2019 12	Osasuna	4–2	Alavés	Pamplona
16:00 CET (UTC+1)	R. García 20'; Ávila 26', (yellow card) 41'; Torres 45+6' (pen.); Villar 55' (pen.); Mérida (yellow card) 69'; Cardona (yellow card) 84'; Estupiñán (yellow card) 90+2'	Report	Magallán (yellow card) 10'; Laguardia 27', (yellow card) 84'; Pérez 51' (pen.)	Stadium: El Sadar; Attendance: 15,954; Referee: José Luis Munuera Montero

10 November 2019 13	Getafe	0–0	Osasuna	Getafe
18:30 CET (UTC+1)	Molina (yellow card) 81'; Nyom (yellow card) 90'	Report	Vidal (yellow card) 49'; Brandon (yellow card) 75'; R. García (yellow card) 75'; Oier (yellow card) 83'	Stadium: Coliseum Alfonso Pérez; Attendance: 10,558; Referee: César Soto Grado

24 November 2019 14	Osasuna	1–2	Athletic Bilbao	Pamplona
14:00 CET (UTC+1)	Ávila (yellow card) 2', (goal) 76'; Brašanac (yellow card) 32'; Lillo (yellow card) 49'; R. García (yellow card) 57'	Report	Williams 21', (yellow card) 58'; Córdoba (yellow card) 52'; Berchiche (yellow card) 61'; Kodro 79'	Stadium: El Sadar; Attendance: 16,145; Referee: José María Sánchez Martínez

1 December 2019 15	Espanyol	2–4	Osasuna	Cornellà de Llobregat
16:00 CET (UTC+1)	Roca 20' (pen.); Sánchez (yellow card) 27'; Calleri 90+3'	Report	Roncaglia (yellow card) 19' (yellow-red card) 52'; R. García 46', (yellow card) 80'; Ávila 49'; Moncayola 84', (yellow card) 90'; Torres 90+2' (pen.)	Stadium: RCDE Stadium; Attendance: 21,238; Referee: Mario Melero López

8 December 2019 16	Osasuna	1–1	Sevilla	Pamplona
21:00 CET (UTC+1)	Rodríguez (yellow card) 16'; Ávila 45+2'; Oier (yellow card) 49' (yellow-red card) 61'; Mérida (yellow card) 77'	Report	Koundé (yellow card) 10'; Munir 11'; Reguilón (yellow card) 44'; Banega (yellow card) 46'; Navas (yellow card) 89'	Stadium: El Sadar; Attendance: 15,045; Referee: Xavier Estrada Fernández

14 December 2019 17	Atlético Madrid	2–0	Osasuna	Madrid
21:00 CET (UTC+1)	Sánchez (yellow card) 26'; Morata 67'; Saúl 75'	Report	Herrera (yellow card) 53'	Stadium: Wanda Metropolitano; Attendance: 45,944; Referee: José Luis Munuera Montero

22 December 2019 18	Osasuna	3–4	Real Sociedad	Pamplona
14:00 CET (UTC+1)	Estupiñán (yellow card) 34'; Aridane 45+1', (yellow card) 90+5'; Brašanac (yellow card) 46'; Ávila 48', 84'; Roncaglia (red card) 70'; Herrera (yellow card) 71'; Villar (yellow card) 88'; Mérida (yellow card) 90+1'	Report	Zubeldia (yellow card) 5'; Oyarzabal 15'; Portu 18'; Ødegaard 28'; Willian José (yellow card) 71'; Isak 79'	Stadium: El Sadar; Attendance: 16,226; Referee: David Medié Jiménez

5 January 2020 19	Celta Vigo	1–1	Osasuna	Vigo
21:00 CET (UTC+1)	Kevin (yellow card) 24'; Beltrán (yellow card) 62'; Mina 75'; Rafinha (yellow card) 82'	Report	Estupiñán (yellow card) 47'; Brašanac (yellow card) 52'; Oier (yellow card) 76'; Ávila 83'	Stadium: Abanca-Balaídos; Attendance: 11,983; Referee: Guillermo Cuadra Fernández

18 January 2020 20	Osasuna	0–0	Valladolid	Pamplona
18:30 CET (UTC+1)	Aridane (yellow card) 73'; R. García (yellow card) 78'	Report	Alcaraz (yellow card) 35'; Fede (yellow card) 65'	Stadium: El Sadar; Attendance: 15,382; Referee: Javier Alberola Rojas

24 January 2020 21	Osasuna	2–0	Levante	Pamplona
21:00 CET (UTC+1)	D. García (yellow card) 53'; Rober (yellow card) 63'; Brašanac (yellow card) 75'; R. García 81' (pen.); Pérez 84'	Report	Campaña (yellow card) 80'; Vukčević (yellow card) 88'; Rochina (yellow card) 90+2'	Stadium: El Sadar; Attendance: 14,667; Referee: César Soto Grado

2 February 2020 22	Villarreal	3–1	Osasuna	Villarreal
18:30 CET (UTC+1)	Alcácer 45+1'; Peña 54'; Cazorla 59' (pen.), (yellow card) 67'; Zambo Anguissa (yellow card) 90+1'; Niño (yellow card) 90+2'	Report	Estupiñán (yellow card) 3'; Aridane 48', (yellow card) 57'	Stadium: Estadio de la Cerámica; Attendance: 17,081; Referee: Valentín Pizarro Gómez

9 February 2020 23	Osasuna	1–4	Real Madrid	Pamplona
16:00 CET (UTC+1)	U. García 14'; Vidal (yellow card) 57'; D. García (yellow card) 69'	Report	Isco 33'; Ramos 38', (yellow card) 79'; Carvajal (yellow card) 73'; Vázquez 84'; Jović 90+2'	Stadium: El Sadar; Attendance: 17,000; Referee: Jesús Gil Manzano

16 February 2020 24	Athletic Bilbao	0–1	Osasuna	Bilbao
18:30 CET (UTC+1)	Vencedor (yellow card) 27'; San José (yellow card) 33'; Martínez (yellow card) 77'; Aduriz (yellow card) 80'	Report	Oier 29', (yellow card) 39'; Roncaglia (yellow card) 38'; Gallego (yellow card) 48'; Brašanac (yellow card) 55'	Stadium: San Mamés; Attendance: 44,222; Referee: Pablo González Fuertes

23 February 2020 25	Osasuna	0–3	Granada	Pamplona
12:00 CET (UTC+1)	Vidal (yellow card) 57'; Ibáñez (yellow card) 59'; Mérida (yellow card) 78'	Report	Machís 4', 28'; Foulquier 41'; Herrera (yellow card) 55'	Stadium: El Sadar; Attendance: 14,866; Referee: José María Sánchez Martínez

1 March 2020 26	Sevilla	3–2	Osasuna	Seville
12:00 CET (UTC+1)	En-Nesyri 13', 90+3'; Fernando (yellow card) 15'; Ocampos 45+1'; Óliver (yellow card) 84'	Report	Herrera (red card) 54'; Aridane 64'; Torres 74' (pen.); Gallego (yellow card) 76'; Brašanac (yellow card) 85'	Stadium: Ramón Sánchez Pizjuán; Attendance: 31,382; Referee: Carlos del Cerro Grande

8 March 2020 27	Osasuna	1–0	Espanyol	Pamplona
12:00 CET (UTC+1)	Torres 51' (pen.); R. García (yellow card) 77'; Oier (yellow card) 88'; Pérez (yellow card) 90+4'	Report	Di. López (yellow card) 60' (yellow-red card) 83'; Calleri (yellow card) 73'	Stadium: El Sadar; Attendance: 15,737; Referee: Ricardo de Burgos Bengoetxea

14 June 2020 28	Real Sociedad	1–1	Osasuna	San Sebastián
22:00 CEST (UTC+2)	Oyarzabal 61'; Merino (yellow card) 67'	Report	Oier (yellow card) 25'; Adrián 29' (pen.); Gallego (yellow card) 72'; Pérez (yellow card) 87'	Stadium: Anoeta; Attendance: 0 Referee: Adrián Cordero Vega
Note: The match was originally scheduled for 15 March, but was postponed due to the COVID-19 pandemic. and rescheduled to 14 June. It was played behind closed doors.

17 June 2020 29	Osasuna	0–5	Atlético Madrid	Pamplona
22:00 CEST (UTC+2)	Arnaiz (yellow card) 58'; Gallego (yellow card) 73'; Pérez (yellow card) 85'	Report	Arias (yellow card) 6'; Félix 27', 56', (yellow card) 45+2'; Savić (yellow card) 45+3'; Llorente 79'; Morata 84'; Carrasco 88'	Stadium: El Sadar; Attendance: 0 Referee: Ricardo de Burgos Bengoetxea
Note: The match was originally scheduled for 20 March, but was postponed due to the 2020 coronavirus pandemic, and rescheduled to 17 June. It was played behind closed doors.

21 June 2020 30	Valencia	2–0	Osasuna	Valencia
19:30 CEST (UTC+2)	Guedes 12', (yellow card) 27'; Rodrigo 35'	Report	Estupiñán (yellow card) 65'; R. García (yellow card) 85'	Stadium: Mestalla; Attendance: 0 Referee: David Medié Jiménez
Note: The match was originally scheduled for 5 April, but was postponed due to the 2020 coronavirus pandemic, and rescheduled to 21 June. It was played behind closed doors.

24 June 2020 31	Alavés	0–1	Osasuna	Vitoria-Gasteiz
19:30 CEST (UTC+2)	Ely (yellow card) 61'; Édgar (yellow card) 90+6'	Report	Oier (yellow card) 38'; Lato (yellow card) 53', (goal) 64'; D. García (yellow card) 85'	Stadium: Mendizorrotza; Attendance: 0 Referee: Alejandro Hernández Hernández
Note: The match was originally scheduled for 12 April, but was postponed due to the 2020 coronavirus pandemic, and rescheduled to 24 June. It was played behind closed doors.

27 June 2020 32	Osasuna	2–1	Leganés	Pamplona
19:30 CEST (UTC+2)	Gallego 9', 90+6'; Brašanac (yellow card) 34'	Report	Awaziem (yellow card) 45'; Avilés 50'	Stadium: El Sadar; Attendance: 0 Referee: Javier Alberola Rojas
Note: The match was originally scheduled for 22 April, but was postponed due to the 2020 coronavirus pandemic, and rescheduled to 27 June. It was played behind closed doors.

2 July 2020 33	Eibar	0–2	Osasuna	Eibar
19:30 CEST (UTC+2)	Rober (yellow card) 4'	Report	R. García 6', 74'; Gallego (yellow card) 45+1'	Stadium: Ipurua Municipal Stadium; Attendance: 0 Referee: José Luis Munuera Montero
Note: The match was originally scheduled for 26 April, but was postponed due to the 2020 coronavirus pandemic. and rescheduled to 2 July. It was played behind closed doors.

5 July 2020 34	Osasuna	0–0	Getafe	Pamplona
19:30 CEST (UTC+2)	Oier (yellow card) 16'; Aridane (yellow card) 37'; Navas (yellow card) 39'; Pérez (yellow card) 79'; Arnaiz (yellow card) 90+5'	Report	Mata (yellow card) 71'; Cucurella (yellow card) 85'; Molina (yellow card) 87'; Chema (yellow card) 90+3'	Stadium: El Sadar; Attendance: 0 Referee: Mario Melero López
Note: The match was originally scheduled for 3 May, but was postponed due to the 2020 coronavirus pandemic, and rescheduled to 5 July. It was played behind closed doors.

8 July 2020 35	Real Betis	3–0	Osasuna	Seville
20:30 CEST (UTC+2)	Rodríguez 4'; Pedraza 25'; Carvalho (yellow card) 75'; Aleñá 90+7'	Report	D. García (yellow card) 12'; Aridane (yellow card) 16'; Mérida (yellow card) 60'; Estupiñán (yellow card) 62'; Lato (yellow card) 66'	Stadium: Benito Villamarín; Attendance: 0 Referee: Alejandro Hernández Hernández
Note: The match was originally scheduled for 10 May, but was postponed due to the 2020 coronavirus pandemic. and rescheduled to 8 July. It was played behind closed doors.

11 July 2020 36	Osasuna	2–1	Celta Vigo	Pamplona
17:00 CEST (UTC+2)	Aridane (yellow card) 3'; Gallego 23'; D. García (yellow card) 48'; Arnaiz 90+1'	Report	Mina 10'; Jorge (yellow card) 19'; Rafinha (yellow card) 59'	Stadium: El Sadar; Attendance: 0 Referee: Valentín Pizarro Gómez
Note: The match was originally scheduled for 13 May, but was postponed due to the 2020 coronavirus pandemic, and rescheduled to 11 July. It was played behind closed doors.

16 July 2020 37	Barcelona	1–2	Osasuna	Barcelona
21:00 CEST (UTC+2)	Semedo (yellow card) 54'; Rakitić (yellow card) 57'; Messi 62'; Piqué (yellow card) 69'; Junior (yellow card) 75'	Report	Arnaiz 15'; Estupiñán (yellow card) 63'; Gallego (red card) 77'; Torres 90+4'	Stadium: Camp Nou; Attendance: 0 Referee: José María Sánchez Martínez
Note: The match was originally scheduled for 17 May, but was postponed due to the 2020 coronavirus pandemic, and rescheduled to 16 July. It was played behind closed doors.

19 July 2020 38	Osasuna	2–2	Mallorca	Pamplona
21:00 CEST (UTC+2)	Lato (yellow card) 13'; Oier (yellow card) 21'; Adrián 21'; Pérez 68'	Report	Agbenyenu 45+1'; Budimir 65'	Stadium: El Sadar; Attendance: 0 Referee: Antonio Mateu Lahoz
Note: The match was originally scheduled for 24 May, but was postponed due to the 2020 coronavirus pandemic, and rescheduled to 19 July. It was played behind closed doors.

=== Copa del Rey ===
19 December 2019 First round	Lorca Deportiva	0–3	Osasuna	Lorca
21:00 CET (UTC+1)	Oliva (yellow card) 40'; Cifuentes (yellow card) 52'	Report	Brandon 20'; Mérida 69' (pen.); Villar 75'	Stadium: Francisco Artés Carrasco; Attendance: 3,000; Referee: Valentín Pizarro Gómez

11 January 2020 Second round	Haro	1–2	Osasuna	Haro
12:00 CET (UTC+1)	Corbalán (yellow card) 54'; Bueno 72'; Loza (yellow card) 86'	Report	Villar (yellow card) 72'; Vidal 76'; Ávila 90'	Stadium: Estadio El Mazo; Attendance: 4,300; Referee: Carlos del Cerro Grande

21 January 2020 Round of 32	Recreativo	2–3 (a.e.t.)	Osasuna	Huelva
19:00 CET (UTC+1)	Morcillo 13'; Roncaglia 45' (o.g.); Cera (yellow card) 57'; López (yellow card) 84'; Vergé (yellow card) 99'; Chuli (yellow card) 107'	Report	Cardona (yellow card) 46'; Ávila (yellow card) 72', (goal) 83'; Brašanac 76'; Moncayola (yellow card) 90'; Pérez 111'	Stadium: Nuevo Colombino; Attendance: 5,000; Referee: Jesús Gil Manzano

29 January 2020 Round of 16	Real Sociedad	3–1	Osasuna	San Sebastián
21:00 CET (UTC+1)	Zubeldia (yellow card) 19'; Isak 33', 69'; Ødegaard 61'	Report	Cardona 36'; R. García (yellow card) 38'; Aridane (yellow card) 60'	Stadium: Anoeta; Attendance: 31,236; Referee: José Luis Munuera Montero

== Statistics ==
=== Appearances and goals ===
Last updated on the end of the season.

No.	Pos	Nat	Player	Total		La Liga		Copa del Rey	
No.	Pos	Nat	Player	Apps	Goals	Apps	Goals	Apps	Goals
Goalkeepers
1	GK	(Spain) ESP	Sergio Herrera	19	0	18+1	0	0	0
13	GK	(Spain) ESP	Rubén	19	0	18+1	0	0	0
26	GK	(Spain) ESP	Juan Pérez	5	0	2	0	3	0
37	GK	(Spain) ESP	Iñaki Álvarez	1	0	0	0	1	0
Defenders
2	DF	(Spain) ESP	Nacho Vidal	33	1	26+4	0	2+1	1
3	DF	(Spain) ESP	Raúl Navas	10	0	8+1	0	1	0
4	DF	(Spain) ESP	Unai García	12	1	6+2	1	4	0
5	DF	(Spain) ESP	David García	32	0	31+1	0	0	0
6	DF	(Spain) ESP	Oier	29	2	27+2	2	0	0
12	DF	(Argentina) ARG	Facundo Roncaglia	19	1	15+1	1	3	0
15	DF	(Spain) ESP	Toni Lato	8	1	6+2	1	0	0
23	DF	(Spain) ESP	Aridane	31	3	29	3	2	0
29	DF	(Spain) ESP	Endika Irigoien	1	0	0	0	0+1	0
30	DF	(Ecuador) ECU	Pervis Estupiñán	39	1	32+4	1	3	0
39	DF	(Spain) ESP	Gorka Zabarte	1	0	0	0	1	0
Midfielders
8	MF	(Spain) ESP	Fran Mérida	25	1	12+11	0	2	1
10	MF	(Spain) ESP	Roberto Torres	38	7	31+5	7	1+1	0
14	MF	(Spain) ESP	Rubén García	31	8	25+5	8	1	0
17	MF	(Spain) ESP	Rober	18	1	5+9	1	3+1	0
19	MF	(Spain) ESP	Kike Barja	10	0	4+4	0	0+2	0
20	MF	(Serbia) SRB	Darko Brašanac	33	1	27+4	0	1+1	1
21	MF	(Spain) ESP	Iñigo Pérez	26	3	11+11	2	4	1
27	MF	(Spain) ESP	Jon Moncayola	31	1	15+12	1	4	0
33	MF	(Spain) ESP	Javier Martínez	2	0	0+1	0	0+1	0
34	MF	(Spain) ESP	Aimar Oroz	1	0	0+1	0	0	0
Forwards
7	FW	(Spain) ESP	Marc Cardona	22	2	9+10	1	3	1
9	FW	(Argentina) ARG	Chimy Ávila	22	11	18+2	9	0+2	2
11	FW	(Spain) ESP	Enric Gallego	14	3	9+5	3	0	0
16	FW	(Spain) ESP	José Arnaiz	14	2	8+6	2	0	0
22	FW	(Spain) ESP	Adrián López	29	2	17+9	2	0+3	0
Players who have made an appearance or had a squad number this season but have left the club
11	FW	(Spain) ESP	Brandon	9	1	5+3	0	1	1
16	DF	(Spain) ESP	Lillo	4	0	2+2	0	0	0
18	FW	(Spain) ESP	Juan Villar	13	2	2+8	1	3	1
28	MF	(Spain) ESP	Luis Perea	2	0	0+2	0	0	0
