= List of Spanish football transfers winter 2019–20 =

This is a list of Spanish football transfers for the winter sale in the 2019–20 season of La Liga. Only moves from La Liga are listed.

The Spanish winter transfer window opened on 2 January 2020, although a few transfers were announced prior to that date. The window closed at midnight on 31 January 2020. Players without a club can join one at any time, either during or in between transfer windows. Clubs below La Liga level can also sign players on loan at any time. If need be, clubs can sign a goalkeeper on an emergency loan, if all others are unavailable.

== Winter 2019–20 La Liga transfer window ==
Note: Clubs highlighted in bold form part of the 2019–20 La Liga.

Date	Name	Moving from	Moving to	Type	Fee
16 November 2019	(Spain) Javi Puado	**Espanyol**	Zaragoza	Loan	
31 December 2019	(Spain) Toni Lato	(Netherlands) PSV Eindhoven	**Valencia**	Loan return	
2 January 2020	(Spain) Carles Aleñá	**Barcelona**	**Real Betis**	Loan	
2 January 2020	(Argentina) Cristian Espinoza	**Villarreal**	(United States) San Jose Earthquakes	Buyout clause	€2.3M
2 January 2020	(Guadeloupe) Dimitri Foulquier	(England) Watford	**Granada**	Loan	
2 January 2020	(Spain) Toni Lato	**Valencia**	**Osasuna**	Loan	
2 January 2020	(Colombia) Adrián Ramos	**Granada**	(Colombia) América de Cali	Transfer	Free
2 January 2020	(Argentina) Federico Varela	**Leganés**	Las Palmas	Loan	
3 January 2020	(Peru) Bryan Reyna	Barakaldo	**Mallorca**	Loan return	
3 January 2020	(Peru) Bryan Reyna	**Mallorca**	Las Rozas	Loan	
7 January 2020	(Israel) Mu'nas Dabbur	**Sevilla**	(Germany) 1899 Hoffenheim	Transfer	€12M
7 January 2020	(Turkey) Arda Turan	(Turkey) İstanbul Başakşehir	**Barcelona**	Loan return	
8 January 2020	(Nigeria) Peter Etebo	(England) Stoke City	**Getafe**	Loan	
9 January 2020	(Spain) Raúl de Tomás	(Portugal) Benfica	**Espanyol**	Transfer	€20M
10 January 2020	(Cameroon) Wilfrid Kaptoum	**Real Betis**	Almería	Loan	€500K
10 January 2020	(Spain) Luis Perea	**Osasuna**	Alcorcón	Loan	
11 January 2020	(Spain) Sergio Buenacasa	Ponferradina	**Mallorca**	Loan return	
11 January 2020	(Spain) Sergio Buenacasa	**Mallorca**	Málaga	Loan	
11 January 2020	(Uruguay) Sebastián Cristóforo	(Italy) Fiorentina	**Eibar**	Loan	
11 January 2020	(Argentina) Guido Rodríguez	(Mexico) América	**Real Betis**	Transfer	€4.5M
12 January 2020	(Spain) José Antonio Caro	Ponferradina	**Valladolid**	Loan return	
12 January 2020	(Argentina) Leo Suárez	**Villarreal**	(Mexico) América	Transfer	Undisclosed
13 January 2020	(Spain) Bernardo Cruz	Alcorcón	**Granada**	Loan return	
13 January 2020	(Spain) Bernardo Cruz	**Granada**	Numancia	Loan	
13 January 2020	(Spain) Raúl García	**Getafe**	**Valladolid**	Loan	
13 January 2020	(Denmark) Simon Kjær	(Italy) Atalanta	**Sevilla**	Loan return	
13 January 2020	(Denmark) Simon Kjær	**Sevilla**	(Italy) Milan	Loan	
13 January 2020	(Morocco) Anuar Tuhami	**Valladolid**	(Greece) Panathinaikos	Loan	
14 January 2020	(Spain) Aridai Cabrera	**Mallorca**	Las Palmas	Transfer	Free
14 January 2020	(Spain) Víctor Camarasa	(England) Crystal Palace	**Real Betis**	Loan return	
14 January 2020	(Spain) Víctor Camarasa	**Real Betis**	**Alavés**	Loan	
14 January 2020	(Spain) Antonio Sivera	**Alavés**	Almería	Loan	
15 January 2020	(Slovakia) Stanislav Lobotka	**Celta Vigo**	(Italy) Napoli	Transfer	€20M
15 January 2020	(Ukraine) Andriy Lunin	**Valladolid**	**Real Madrid**	Loan return	
15 January 2020	(Ukraine) Andriy Lunin	**Real Madrid**	Oviedo	Loan	
15 January 2020	(Colombia) Jeison Murillo	**Valencia**	(Italy) Sampdoria	Buyout clause	€12M
15 January 2020	(Colombia) Jeison Murillo	(Italy) Sampdoria	**Celta Vigo**	Loan	
15 January 2020	(Spain) Brandon Thomas	**Osasuna**	Girona	Loan	
15 January 2020	(France) Jean-Clair Todibo	**Barcelona**	(Germany) Schalke 04	Loan	€1.5M
16 January 2020	(Morocco) Youssef En-Nesyri	**Leganés**	**Sevilla**	Transfer	€20M
16 January 2020	(Spain) Ivi	Huesca	**Levante**	Loan return	
16 January 2020	(Spain) Ivi	**Levante**	Ponferradina	Loan	
16 January 2020	(Ukraine) Vasyl Kravets	**Leganés**	Lugo	Loan	
16 January 2020	(Spain) Luismi	**Valladolid**	Oviedo	Loan	
16 January 2020	(Spain) Sabin Merino	**Leganés**	Deportivo La Coruña	Transfer	Free
16 January 2020	(Spain) Alejandro Pozo	**Sevilla**	**Mallorca**	Loan	
17 January 2020	(Spain) Jorge de Frutos	**Valladolid**	**Real Madrid**	Loan return	
17 January 2020	(Spain) Jorge de Frutos	**Real Madrid**	Rayo Vallecano	Loan	
17 January 2020	(Sweden) John Guidetti	**Alavés**	(Germany) Hannover 96	Loan	
18 January 2020	(Guadeloupe) Claudio Beauvue	**Celta Vigo**	Deportivo La Coruña	Transfer	Free
18 January 2020	(Ghana) Mubarak Wakaso	**Alavés**	(China) Jiangsu Suning	Transfer	Undisclosed
20 January 2020	(Uruguay) Leandro Cabrera	**Getafe**	**Espanyol**	Transfer	€9M
20 January 2020	(Brazil) Reinier	(Brazil) Flamengo	**Real Madrid**	Transfer	€30M
20 January 2020	(Spain) Roberto	(England) West Ham United	**Alavés**	Loan	
20 January 2020	(Cameroon) Karl Toko Ekambi	**Villarreal**	(France) Lyon	Loan	
21 January 2020	(Brazil) Deyverson	(Brazil) Palmeiras	**Getafe**	Loan	
21 January 2020	(Mexico) Javier Hernández	**Sevilla**	(United States) LA Galaxy	Transfer	€8.5M
22 January 2020	(Spain) Álvaro Aguado	**Valladolid**	Numancia	Loan	
22 January 2020	(Spain) Lillo	**Osasuna**	(Israel) Maccabi Haifa	Transfer	Free
22 January 2020	(Spain) Álvaro Odriozola	**Real Madrid**	(Germany) Bayern Munich	Loan	
22 January 2020	(Spain) Roberto Olabe	Albacete	**Eibar**	Loan return	
22 January 2020	(Spain) Roberto Olabe	**Eibar**	Extremadura	Loan	
23 January 2020	(Spain) Markel Bergara	**Getafe**	Retired		
23 January 2020	(Spain) Adri Embarba	Rayo Vallecano	**Espanyol**	Transfer	€10M
23 January 2020	(Ghana) Owusu Kwabena	Córdoba	**Leganés**	Loan return	
23 January 2020	(Ghana) Owusu Kwabena	**Leganés**	(Azerbaijan) Qarabağ	Transfer	€300K
24 January 2020	(Spain) Álex Alegría	**Mallorca**	Extremadura	Loan	
24 January 2020	(Italy) Federico Barba	**Valladolid**	(Italy) Chievo	Loan return	
24 January 2020	(Croatia) Filip Bradarić	(Italy) Cagliari	**Celta Vigo**	Loan	
24 January 2020	(Romania) Cristian Ganea	**Athletic Bilbao**	(Romania) Viitorul Constanța	Loan	
24 January 2020	(Spain) Jesús Vallejo	(England) Wolverhampton Wanderers	**Real Madrid**	Loan return	
24 January 2020	(Spain) Jesús Vallejo	**Real Madrid**	**Granada**	Loan	
25 January 2020	(Spain) David Costas	**Celta Vigo**	Almería	Loan	
27 January 2020	(Cameroon) Jeando Fuchs	(Israel) Maccabi Haifa	**Alavés**	Loan return	
27 January 2020	(Senegal) Sekou Gassama	Almería	**Valladolid**	Transfer	€400K
27 January 2020	(Senegal) Sekou Gassama	**Valladolid**	Extremadura	Loan	
28 January 2020	(France) Hatem Ben Arfa	Unattached	**Valladolid**	Transfer	Free
28 January 2020	(France) Pierre Cornud	Oviedo B	**Mallorca**	Loan return	
28 January 2020	(France) Pierre Cornud	**Mallorca**	Ibiza	Loan	
28 January 2020	(Spain) Enric Gallego	**Getafe**	**Osasuna**	Loan	
29 January 2020	(Brazil) Guilherme Arana	(Italy) Atalanta	**Sevilla**	Loan return	
29 January 2020	(Brazil) Guilherme Arana	**Sevilla**	(Brazil) Atlético Mineiro	Loan	
29 January 2020	(Argentina) Santiago Cáseres	**Villarreal**	(Mexico) América	Loan	
29 January 2020	(Serbia) Ljubomir Fejsa	(Portugal) Benfica	**Alavés**	Loan	
29 January 2020	(Greece) Leonardo Koutris	(Greece) Olympiacos	**Mallorca**	Loan	€500K
29 January 2020	(Spain) Suso	(Italy) Milan	**Sevilla**	Loan	
30 January 2020	(Spain) Paco Alcácer	(Germany) Borussia Dortmund	**Villarreal**	Transfer	€23M
30 January 2020	(Spain) José Arnaiz	**Leganés**	**Osasuna**	Loan	
30 January 2020	(Spain) Chema	(England) Nottingham Forest	**Getafe**	Transfer	€1.5M
30 January 2020	(Italy) Alessandro Florenzi	(Italy) Roma	**Valencia**	Loan	
30 January 2020	(Spain) Esteban Granero	**Espanyol**	Marbella	Transfer	Free
30 January 2020	(Spain) Lluís López	**Espanyol**	Tenerife	Loan	
30 January 2020	(Russia) Fyodor Smolov	(Russia) Lokomotiv Moscow	**Celta Vigo**	Loan	€600K
31 January 2020	(France) Ibrahim Amadou	(England) Norwich City	**Sevilla**	Loan return	
31 January 2020	(France) Ibrahim Amadou	**Sevilla**	**Leganés**	Loan	
31 January 2020	(Ivory Coast) Roger Assalé	(Switzerland) Young Boys	**Leganés**	Loan	
31 January 2020	(Spain) Bruno	**Getafe**	**Levante**	Transfer	Free
31 January 2020	(Uruguay) Erick Cabaco	**Levante**	**Getafe**	Transfer	€8M
31 January 2020	(Belgium) Yannick Carrasco	(China) Dalian Professional	**Atlético Madrid**	Loan	
31 January 2020	(Portugal) Gil Dias	(France) Monaco	**Granada**	Loan	
31 January 2020	(Brazil) Matheus Fernandes	(Brazil) Palmeiras	**Valladolid**	Loan	
31 January 2020	(Spain) Francis	**Real Betis**	Almería	Loan	
31 January 2020	(Spain) Bryan Gil	**Sevilla**	**Leganés**	Loan	
31 January 2020	(Spain) Miguel Ángel Guerrero	(Greece) Olympiacos	**Leganés**	Loan	
31 January 2020	(Spain) Édgar Méndez	(Mexico) Cruz Azul	**Alavés**	Transfer	Undisclosed
31 January 2020	(Spain) Javi Muñoz	**Alavés**	Tenerife	Loan	
31 January 2020	(Spain) Oier Olazábal	**Levante**	**Espanyol**	Transfer	€1.5M
31 January 2020	(Spain) Rubén Pardo	**Real Sociedad**	(France) Bordeaux	Transfer	Free
31 January 2020	(France) Modibo Sagnan	**Real Sociedad**	Mirandés	Loan	
31 January 2020	(Portugal) Rafa Soares	(Portugal) Vitória Guimarães	**Eibar**	Loan	
31 January 2020	(Colombia) Dani Torres	**Alavés**	Zaragoza	Transfer	Free
31 January 2020	(Spain) Koke Vegas	Deportivo La Coruña	**Levante**	Loan return	
31 January 2020	(Senegal) Moussa Wagué	**Barcelona**	(France) Nice	Loan	
