= 2018–19 CA Osasuna season =

CA Osasuna
2018–19 season
- President: Luis Sabalza
- Head coach: Jagoba Arrasate
- Stadium: El Sadar
- Segunda División: 1st (promoted)
- Copa del Rey: Second round
- Top goalscorer: Roberto Torress; Juan Villar (12 each)
Home colours	Away colours

During the 2018–19 season, CA Osasuna participated in the Segunda División and the Copa del Rey.

== Squad ==
As of 27 March 2019

Note: Flags indicate national team as defined under FIFA eligibility rules; some limited exceptions apply. Players may hold more than one non-FIFA nationality.

No.	Pos.	Nation	Player
1	GK	ESP	Sergio Herrera
2	DF	ESP	Nacho Vidal
5	DF	ESP	David García
6	DF	ESP	Oier (Captain)
8	MF	ESP	Fran Mérida
9	FW	ESP	Xisco
10	MF	ESP	Roberto Torres (2nd captain)
11	DF	ESP	Carlos Clerc
13	GK	ESP	Rubén Martínez
14	FW	ESP	Rubén García
15	DF	ESP	Unai García
16	DF	ESP	Lillo Castellano
17	FW	ESP	Brandon

No.	Pos.	Nation	Player
18	FW	ESP	Juan Villar
19	FW	ESP	Kike Barja
20	MF	ESP	Robert Ibáñez (on loan from Getafe)
21	MF	ESP	Iñigo Pérez
23	DF	ESP	Aridane
26	GK	ESP	Juan Pérez
27	MF	ESP	Miguel Olavide
28	MF	ESP	Luis Perea
29	DF	ESP	Endika Irigoien
30	MF	ESP	Javi Martínez
31	GK	ESP	Iván Martínez
32	DF	ESP	Jorge Herrando

== Competitions ==
=== Overall ===
Competition	Final position
Segunda División	1st
Copa del Rey	Second round

=== Segunda División ===
==== League table ====
Pos	Team	Pld	W	D	L	GF	GA	GD	Pts	Promotion, qualification or relegation
1	Osasuna (C, P)	42	26	9	7	59	35	+24	87	Promotion to La Liga
2	Granada (P)	42	22	13	7	52	28	+24	79	Promotion to La Liga
3	Málaga	42	21	11	10	51	31	+20	74	Qualification to promotion play-offs
4	Albacete	42	19	14	9	54	38	+16	71	Qualification to promotion play-offs
5	Mallorca (O, P)	42	19	12	11	53	37	+16	69	Qualification to promotion play-offs

Source: La Liga
Rules for classification: 1) points; 2) head-to-head points; 3) head-to-head goal difference; 4) goal difference; 5) number of goals scored
(C) Champions; (O) Play-off winners; (P) Promoted

=== Copa del Rey ===
12 September 2018 Second round	Osasuna	1–2	Reus	Pamplona
20:00	Clerc 87'	Report	Carbià 60'; Juan Domínguez 68'	Stadium: El Sadar; Attendance: 10,987; Referee: César Soto Grado
