= Robert Ibáñez =

Spanish footballer (born 1993)

Personal information
- Full name: Roberto Ibáñez Castro
- Date of birth: 22 March 1993 (age 33)
- Place of birth: Valencia, Spain
- Height: 1.75 m (5 ft 9 in)
- Position: Winger

Youth career
- 2000–2012: Valencia

Senior career*
Years	Team	Apps	(Gls)
2011–2015	Valencia B	73	(10)
2014–2017	Valencia	4	(0)
2015–2016	→ Granada (loan)	35	(4)
2016–2017	→ Leganés (loan)	5	(2)
2018–2019	Getafe	7	(0)
2018	→ Osasuna (loan)	17	(2)
2019	→ Osasuna (loan)	13	(2)
2019–2022	Osasuna	18	(1)
2020–2021	→ Leganés (loan)	24	(3)
2022	→ Leganés (loan)	16	(1)
2022–2024	Levante	40	(4)
2025	Lamia	11	(0)
2025–2026	Eldense	19	(5)
- * Club domestic league appearances and goals as of 10 June 2026

Roberto "Rober" Ibáñez Castro (born 22 March 1993) is a Spanish professional footballer who plays as a right winger.

== Club career ==
Born in Valencia, Valencian Community, Rober joined Valencia CF's youth setup in 2000, aged seven. He made his senior debuts for the reserves in the 2010–11 season in Tercera División, and subsequently appeared regularly with the side in Segunda División B.

In the 2014 summer, Rober was called up to the main squad by new manager Nuno Espírito Santo, also taking part of the club's Emirates Cup winning campaign. He made his first-team – and La Liga – debut on 29 August 2014, coming on as a late substitute in a 3–0 home win against Málaga CF.

On 16 January 2015, Rober was loaned to fellow league team Granada CF, until June. On 25 January 2015, he scored his first professional goal, netting the last in a 2–2 home draw against Deportivo de La Coruña.

On 13 July 2015, Rober returned to the Andalusians, in a season-long loan deal. He would only appear in 18 matches during the campaign (seven starts), as his side avoided relegation. On 31 August of the following year, he moved to fellow top tier CD Leganés, after agreeing to a one-year loan deal.

On 21 November 2016, Rober scored a double in a 2–0 home win against CA Osasuna, but suffered a serious knee injury which sidelined him for the remainder of the season. On 3 January 2018, he signed a three-and-a-half-year contract with Getafe CF still in the top tier, but was immediately loaned to Osasuna in Segunda División until June.

On 29 January 2019, after being sparingly used by Geta in the 2018–19 campaign, Rober returned to Osasuna on loan until June. On 12 August, after achieving promotion to the top tier, he signed a permanent four-year deal with the club, for a fee of € 2 million; his release clause was set at €10 million.

On 24 August 2020, Rober returned to Lega on loan for the 2020–21 season, with an obligatory buyout clause in case of promotion. He rejoined the club for a third spell on 11 January 2022, also on loan.

On 10 August 2022, Rober signed a two-year contract with Levante UD in the second level. On 30 August 2024, he was dismissed from the club.

== Club statistics ==
As of match played 6 June 2021

Appearances and goals by club, season and competition
Club	Season	League			Copa del Rey		Other		Total	
Club	Season	Division	Apps	Goals	Apps	Goals	Apps	Goals	Apps	Goals
Valencia B	2011–12	Segunda División B	23	3	—		—		23	3
Valencia B	2012–13	Segunda División B	15	0	—		—		15	0
Valencia B	2013–14	Segunda División B	33	5	—		2 (Note: Appearance(s) in Relegation Playoffs)	0	35	5
Valencia B	2014–15	Segunda División B	2	1	—		—		2	1
Valencia B	Total		73	9	—		2	0	75	9
Valencia	2014–15	La Liga	4	0	1	0	—		5	0
Valencia	2017–18	La Liga	0	0	1	1	—		1	1
Valencia	Total		4	0	2	1	—		6	1
Granada (loan)	2014–15	La Liga	17	5	0	0	—		17	5
Granada (loan)	2015–16	La Liga	18	0	2	0	—		20	0
Granada (loan)	Total		35	5	2	0	—		37	5
Leganés (loan)	2016–17	La Liga	5	2	0	0	—		5	2
Getafe	2017–18	La Liga	0	0	—		—		0	0
Getafe	2018–19	La Liga	7	0	4	1	—		11	1
Getafe	Total		7	0	4	1	—		11	1
Osasuna (loan)	2017–18	Segunda División	17	2	0	0	—		17	2
Osasuna	2018–19	Segunda División	13	2	0	0	—		13	2
Osasuna	2019–20	La Liga	14	1	4	0	—		18	1
Osasuna	2021–22	La Liga	0	0	0	0	—		0	0
Osasuna	Total		44	5	4	0	—		48	5
Leganés (loan)	2020–21	Segunda División	24	3	2	0	2 (Note: Appearance(s) in Promotion Playoffs)	1	28	4
Career total			192	24	14	2	4	1	210	27

== Honors ==
Valencia

- L'Alcudia International Football Tournament: 2011

Osasuna

- Segunda División: 2018–19

Individual

- L'Alcudia International Football Tournament MVP of the Tournament: 2011
