= Segunda División Player of the Month =

Spanish football award

The Player of the Month is an association football award that recognises the best Segunda División player for each month of the season.

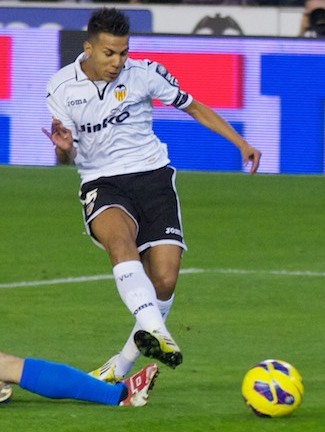
Jonathan Viera has won a record four Player of the Month awards.

== Winners ==
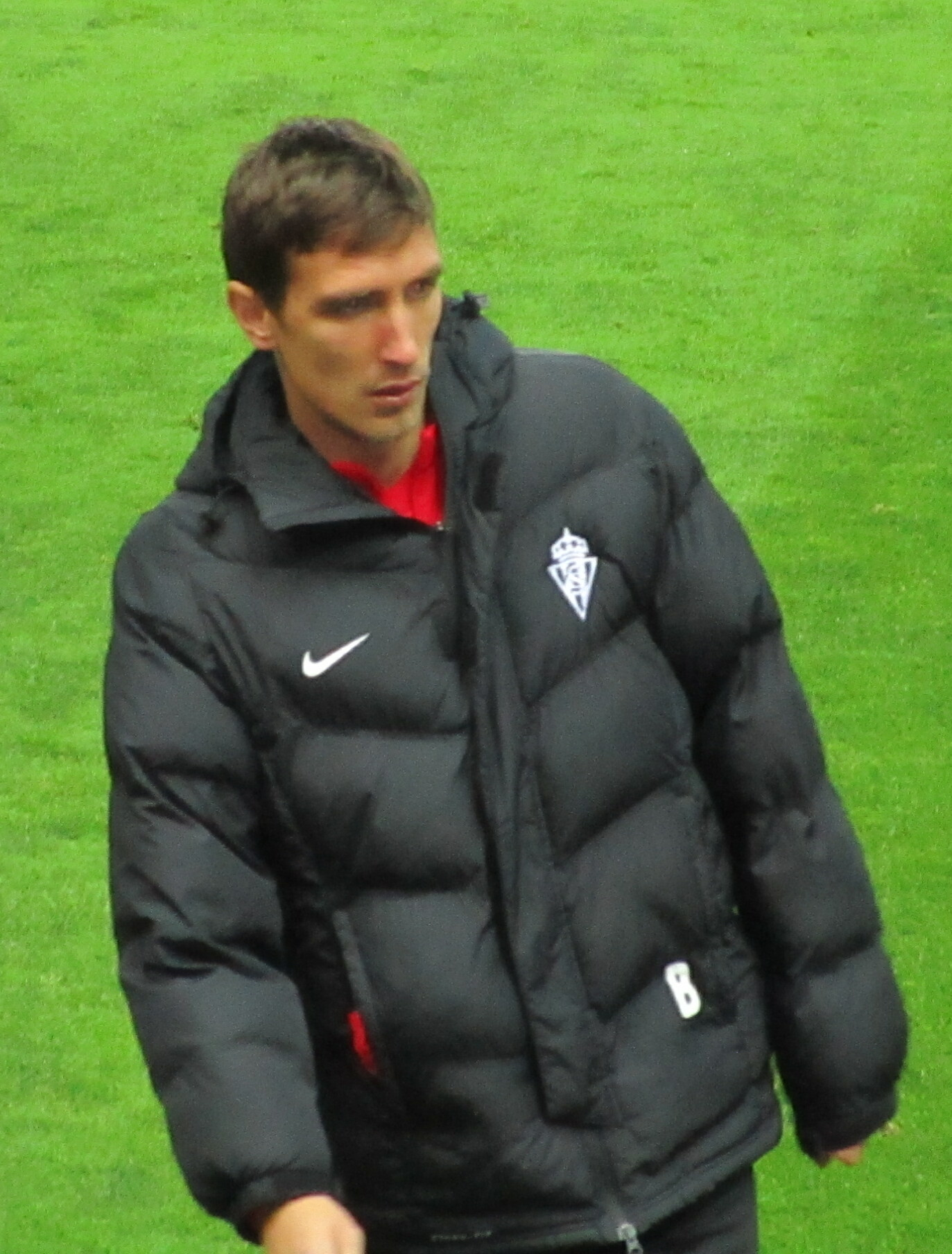
Stefan Šćepović won the first Player of the Month award in September 2013.

Month	Year (Note: Each year is linked to an article on the particular season associated with the month of that year.)	Player	Nationality	Pos.	Club	Ref.
September	2013	Stefan Šćepović	Serbia	FW	Sporting Gijón	
October	2013	Manuel Arana	Spain	MF	Recreativo	
November	2013	Borja Viguera	Spain	FW	Alavés	
December	2013	José Luis Morales	Spain	FW	Eibar	
January	2014	Roger Martí	Spain	FW	Zaragoza	
February	2014	Jota	Spain	MF	Eibar	
March	2014	Ayoze Pérez	Spain	FW	Tenerife	
April	2014	Ayoze Pérez	Spain	FW	Tenerife	
May	2014	Kike García	Spain	FW	Murcia	
September	2014	Sergio Araujo	Argentina	FW	Las Palmas	
October	2014	Marco Asensio	Spain	MF	Mallorca	
November	2014	Sergi Enrich	Spain	FW	Numancia	
December	2014	Óscar	Spain	MF	Valladolid	
January	2015	Roque Mesa	Spain	MF	Las Palmas	
February	2015	Chuli	Spain	FW	Leganés	
March	2015	Manu Barreiro	Spain	FW	Alavés	
April	2015	René Román	Spain	GK	Llagostera	
May	2015	Jonathan Viera	Spain	MF	Las Palmas	
September	2015	Sergio León	Spain	FW	Elche	
October	2015	Florin Andone	Romania	FW	Córdoba	
November	2015	Óscar Plano	Spain	FW	Alcorcón	
December	2015	Juan Villar	Spain	FW	Valladolid	
January	2016	Alexander Szymanowski	Argentina	MF	Leganés	
February	2016	José Naranjo	Spain	FW	Gimnàstic	
March	2016	Achille Emaná	Cameroon	MF	Gimnàstic	
April	2016	Isaac Becerra	Spain	GK	Girona	
May	2016	Manu García	Spain	MF	Alavés	
June	2016	Mikel Merino	Spain	MF	Osasuna	
August	2016	Ángel	Spain	FW	Zaragoza	
September	2016	Joselu	Spain	FW	Lugo	
October	2016	Brandon	Spain	FW	Mallorca	
November	2016	Pablo Valcarce	Spain	FW	Numancia	
December	2016	Alfredo Ortuño	Spain	FW	Cádiz	
January	2017	Toché	Spain	FW	Oviedo	
February	2017	Roger Martí	Spain	FW	Levante	
March	2017	Quique González	Spain	FW	Almería	
April	2017	Jorge Molina	Spain	FW	Getafe	
May	2017	Anthony Lozano	Honduras	FW	Tenerife	
September	2017	Jaime Mata	Spain	FW	Valladolid	
October	2017	Borja Iglesias	Spain	FW	Zaragoza	
November	2017	Cucho Hernández	Colombia	FW	Huesca	
December	2017	Carlos Hernández	Spain	DF	Oviedo	
January	2018	Juan Carlos	Spain	GK	Lugo	
February	2018	Raúl de Tomás	Spain	FW	Rayo Vallecano	
March	2018	Jony Rodríguez	Spain	MF	Sporting Gijón	
April	2018	Raúl de Tomás	Spain	FW	Rayo Vallecano	
September	2018	Munir	Morocco	GK	Málaga	
October	2018	Carlos Fernández	Spain	FW	Deportivo La Coruña	
November	2018	Enric Gallego	Spain	FW	Extremadura	
December	2018	Eugeni	Spain	MF	Albacete	
January	2019	Roberto Torres	Spain	MF	Osasuna	
February	2019	Darwin Machís	Venezuela	FW	Cádiz	
March	2019	Luis Milla	Spain	MF	Tenerife	
April	2019	Salva Sevilla	Spain	MF	Mallorca	
September	2019	Sekou Gassama	Senegal	FW	Almería	
October	2019	Anthony Lozano	Honduras	FW	Cádiz	
November	2019	Fidel	Spain	MF	Elche	
December	2019	Jonathan Viera	Spain	MF	Las Palmas	
January	2020	Sabin Merino	Spain	FW	Deportivo La Coruña	
June	2020	Rubén Castro	Spain	FW	Las Palmas	
September	2020	Uroš Đurđević	Serbia (Note: Represented Montenegro at international level after the award was given.)	FW	Sporting Gijón	
October	2020	Manolo Reina	Spain	GK	Mallorca	
November	2020	Leonardo Acevedo	Colombia	FW	UD Logroñés	
December	2020	Raúl de Tomás	Spain	FW	Espanyol	
January	2021	Umar Sadiq	Nigeria	FW	Almería	
February	2021	Rubén Pardo	Spain	MF	Leganés	
March	2021	Adri Embarba	Spain	MF	Espanyol	
April	2021	Javi Puado	Spain	FW	Espanyol	
May	2021	Abdón	Spain	FW	Mallorca	
October	2021	Stoichkov	Spain	FW	Eibar	
November	2021	Fernando	Spain	GK	Almería	
December	2021	Cristhian Stuani	Uruguay	FW	Girona	
January	2022	Sergio Castel	Spain	FW	Ibiza	
February	2022	Umar Sadiq	Nigeria	FW	Almería	
March	2022	Nahuel Bustos	Argentina	FW	Girona	
April	2022	Borja Bastón	Spain	FW	Oviedo	
May	2022	Jonathan Viera	Spain	MF	Las Palmas	
August	2022	Myrto Uzuni	Albania	FW	Granada	
September	2022	José Antonio Caro	Spain	GK	Burgos	
October	2022	Jonathan Viera	Spain	MF	Las Palmas	
November	2022	Sinan Bakış	Turkey	FW	Andorra	
December	2022	Roberto López	Spain	MF	Mirandés	
January	2023	Stoichkov	Spain	FW	Eibar	
February	2023	Luis Rioja	Spain	MF	Alavés	
March	2023	Jon Bautista	Spain	FW	Eibar	
April	2023	Sergi Enrich	Spain	FW	Oviedo	
August	2023	Cristian Álvarez	Argentina	GK	Zaragoza	
September	2023	Javi Puado	Spain	FW	Espanyol	
October	2023	Jon Bautista	Spain	FW	Eibar	
November	2023	Miguel de la Fuente	Spain	FW	Leganés	
December	2023	Iker Losada	Spain	FW	Racing Ferrol	
January	2024	Sebas Moyano	Spain	FW	Oviedo	
February	2024	Martin Braithwaite	Denmark	FW	Espanyol	
March	2024	Nicolás Fernández	Argentina	DF	Elche	
April	2024	Monchu	Spain	MF	Valladolid	
August	2024	Andrés Martín	Spain	FW	Racing Santander	
September	2024	Álex Sancris	Spain	FW	Burgos	
October	2024	Iñigo Vicente	Spain	MF	Racing Santander	
November	2024	Alfonso Herrero	Spain	GK	Málaga	
December	2024	Patrick Soko	Cameroon	FW	Huesca	
January	2025	Alemão	Brazil	FW	Oviedo	
February	2025	Javier Ontiveros	Spain	FW	Cádiz	
March	2025	Joaquín Panichelli	Argentina	FW	Mirandés	
April	2025	Lucas Boyé	Argentina	FW	Granada	
August	2025	Asier Villalibre	Spain	FW	Racing Santander	
September	2025	Zakaria Eddahchouri	Netherlands	FW	Deportivo La Coruña	
October	2025	Jeremy Arévalo	Ecuador	FW	Racing Santander	
November	2025	Yeremay Hernández	Spain	FW	Deportivo La Coruña	
December	2025	César Gelabert	Spain	FW	Sporting Gijón	
January	2026	Chupete	Spain	FW	Málaga	
February	2026	Brian Cipenga	DR Congo	FW	Castellón	
March	2026	Chupete	Spain	FW	Málaga	
April	2026	Josep Cerdà	Spain	FW	Andorra	
August	2026	Taisei Miyashiro	Japan	FW	Las Palmas	
September	2026	Jon Guruzeta	Spain	FW	Eibar	
Octobet	2026	Israel Suero	Spain	MF	Castellón	

== Multiple winners ==
The following table lists the number of awards won by players who have won at least two Player of the Month awards.

Players in bold are still active in the Segunda División.

Rank	Player	Wins
1st	(Spain) Jonathan Viera	4
2nd	(Spain) Raúl de Tomás	3
3rd	(Spain) **Jon Bautista**	2
3rd	(Spain) Chupete	2
3rd	(Spain) Sergi Enrich	2
3rd	(Honduras) Anthony Lozano	2
3rd	(Spain) Ayoze Pérez	2
3rd	(Spain) Javi Puado	2
3rd	(Spain) Roger Martí	2
3rd	(Nigeria) Umar Sadiq	2
3rd	(Spain) Stoichkov	2

== Awards won by nationality ==
As of October 2026

Nationality	Players	Wins
Spain	75	86
Argentina	7	7
Cameroon	2	2
Colombia	2	2
Serbia	2	2
Honduras	1	2
Nigeria	1	2
Albania	1	1
Brazil	1	1
DR Congo	1	1
Denmark	1	1
Ecuador	1	1
Japan	1	1
Morocco	1	1
Netherlands	1	1
Romania	1	1
Senegal	1	1
Turkey	1	1
Uruguay	1	1
Venezuela	1	1

== Awards won by position ==
As of October 2026

Position	Players	Wins
Forward	69	79
Midfielder	23	26
Goalkeeper	9	9
Defender	2	2

== Awards won by club ==
As of October 2026

Club	Players	Wins
Las Palmas	5	8
Eibar	6	7
Oviedo	6	6
Mallorca	5	5
Almería	4	5
Espanyol	4	5
Alavés	4	4
Cádiz	4	4
Deportivo A Coruña	4	4
Leganés	4	4
Racing Santander	4	4
Sporting Gijón	4	4
Valladolid	4	4
Zaragoza	4	4
Málaga	3	4
Tenerife	2	4
Elche	3	3
Girona	3	3
Andorra	2	2
Burgos	2	2
Castellón	2	2
Gimnàstic	2	2
Granada	2	2
Huesca	2	2
Lugo	2	2
Mirandés	2	2
Numancia	2	2
Osasuna	2	2
Rayo Vallecano	1	2
Albacete	1	1
Alcorcón	1	1
Córdoba	1	1
Extremadura	1	1
Getafe	1	1
Ibiza	1	1
Levante	1	1
Llagostera	1	1
Murcia	1	1
Racing Ferrol	1	1
Recreativo	1	1
UD Logroñés	1	1
