= 2017–18 CA Osasuna season =

CA Osasuna
2017–18 season
- President: Luis Sabalza
- Head coach: Diego Martínez
- Stadium: El Sadar
- Segunda División: 8th
- Copa del Rey: Third round
- Top goalscorer: Xisco (8)
Home colours	Away colours

During the 2017–18 season, CA Osasuna competed in the Segunda División and the Copa del Rey.

== Squad ==
As of 1 September 2017

Note: Flags indicate national team as defined under FIFA eligibility rules; some limited exceptions apply. Players may hold more than one non-FIFA nationality.

No.	Pos.	Nation	Player
1	GK	ESP	Sergio Herrera
2	DF	ESP	Javier Flaño
3	DF	DOM	Tano Bonnín
4	DF	ESP	Miguel Flaño (Captain)
5	DF	ESP	David García (4th captain)
6	MF	ESP	Oier (2nd captain)
7	FW	ESP	David Rodríguez
8	MF	ESP	Fran Mérida
9	FW	ESP	Quique González
10	MF	ESP	Roberto Torres (3rd captain)
11	DF	ESP	Carlos Clerc
13	GK	ESP	Manu Herrera
14	MF	ESP	Fausto Tienza
15	DF	ESP	Unai García

No.	Pos.	Nation	Player
16	MF	ESP	Miguel Díaz
17	FW	ESP	Xisco
19	MF	ARG	Mateo García (on loan from Las Palmas)
20	MF	ESP	Miguel de las Cuevas
21	MF	ARG	Joaquín Arzura (on loan from River Plate)
22	MF	ESP	Sebas Coris (on loan from Girona)
23	DF	GEQ	Aridane
24	MF	ESP	Lucas Torró
26	GK	ESP	Juan Pérez
28	MF	ESP	Luis Perea
30	MF	ESP	Kike Barja
34	DF	ESP	Aitor Buñuel
36	MF	ESP	Antonio Otegui
—	DF	ESP	Lillo

=== Transfers ===
- List of Spanish football transfers summer 2017 § Osasuna

==== In ====
Date	Player	From	Type	Fee	Ref
18 May 2017	(Spain) Kike Barja	(Spain) Osasuna B	Promoted		
13 June 2017	(Spain) Miguel Díaz	(Spain) Osasuna B	Promoted		
29 June 2017	(Spain) David Rodríguez	(Spain) Alcorcón	Transfer	€350K	
1 July 2017	(Spain) Sebas Coris	(Spain) Girona	Loan	Free	
6 July 2017	(Spain) Lucas Torró	(Spain) Real Madrid B	Transfer	Free	
12 July 2017	(Spain) Sergio Herrera	(Spain) Huesca	Transfer	€300K	
13 July 2017	(Argentina) Mateo García	(Spain) Las Palmas	Loan	Free	
14 July 2017	(Spain) Quique	(Spain) Almería	Transfer	€1.5M	
17 July 2017	(Spain) Aridane	(Spain) Cádiz	Transfer	€1.5M	
21 July 2017	(Spain) Xisco	(Thailand) Muangthong United	Transfer	Free	
26 July 2017	(Argentina) Joaquín Arzura	(Argentina) River Plate	Loan	Free	
3 August 2017	(Spain) Manu Herrera	(Spain) Betis	Transfer	Free	

==== Out ====
Date	Player	To	Type	Fee	Ref
30 June 2017	(Spain) Sergio León	(Spain) Betis	Transfer	€3.5M	
30 June 2017	(Spain) Oriol Riera	(Spain) Deportivo La Coruña	Loan return	Free	
30 June 2017	(France) Didier Digard	(Spain) Betis	Loan return	Free	
30 June 2017	(France) Emmanuel Rivière	(England) Newcastle United	Loan return	Free	
30 June 2017	(Italy) Salvatore Sirigu	(France) Paris Saint-Germain	Loan return	Free	
1 July 2017	(Spain) Mario Fernández	TBD		Free	
1 July 2017	(Cameroon) Raoul Loé	TBD		Free	
1 July 2017	(Spain) Fuentes	TBD		Free	
1 July 2017	(Spain) Kenan Kodro	(Germany) Mainz 05	Transfer	€1.75M	
7 July 2017	(Montenegro) Nikola Vujadinović	(Poland) Lech Poznań	Transfer	Free	
8 July 2017	(Spain) Jaime Romero	(Spain) Córdoba	Transfer	€500K	
11 July 2017	(Serbia) Goran Čaušić	(Russia) Arsenal Tula	Transfer	Free	
17 July 2017	(Spain) Álex Berenguer	(Italy) Torino	Transfer	€5.5M	
28 July 2017	(Spain) Nauzet Pérez	TBD		Free	

== Competitions ==
=== Overall ===
Competition	Final position
Segunda División	8th
Copa del Rey	Third round

=== Liga ===
==== League table ====
Pos	Team	Pld	W	D	L	GF	GA	GD	Pts	Promotion, qualification or relegation
6	Numancia	42	18	11	13	52	41	+11	65 (Note: Numancia finished ahead of Oviedo on head-to-head goal difference: Oviedo 3–1 Numancia, Numancia 3–0 Oviedo)	Qualification for promotion play-offs
7	Oviedo	42	18	11	13	54	48	+6	65	
8	Osasuna	42	16	16	10	44	34	+10	64 (Note: Osasuna finished ahead of Cádiz on head-to-head points: Cádiz 0–2 Osasuna, Osasuna 1–0 Cádiz)	
9	Cádiz	42	16	16	10	42	29	+13	64	
10	Granada	42	17	10	15	55	50	+5	61	

Source: La Liga
Rules for classification: 1) points; 2) head-to-head points; 3) head-to-head goal difference; 4) goal difference; 5) number of goals scored

==== Matches ====
Kickoff times are in CET. Win Draw Loss

Match	Opponent	Venue	Result
1	Sevilla At.	H	1–1
2	Cultural	A	2–1
3	Huesca	H	1–1
4	Rayo	A	0–3
5	Almería	H	2–1
6	Reus		–
7	Sporting		–
8	Cádiz		–
9	Albacete		–
10	Zaragoza		–
11	Barcelona B		–
12	Tenerife		–
13	Granada		–
14	Córdoba		–
15	Alcorcón		–
16	Lugo		–
17	Nàstic		–
18	Oviedo		–
19	Numancia		–
20	Lorca		–
21	Valladolid		–

Match	Opponent	Venue	Result
22			–
23			–
24			–
25			–
26			–
27			–
28			–
29			–
30			–
31			–
32			–
33			–
34			–
35			–
36			–
37			–
38			–
39			–
40			–
41			–
42			–
