= Luis Perea =

Luis Perea may refer to:

- Luis Carlos Perea (born 1963), Colombian football centre-back
- Luis Amaranto Perea (born 1979), Colombian football manager and former defender
- Luis Alberto Perea (born 1986), Colombian football striker, and son of Luis Carlos Perea
- Luis Perea (footballer, born 1997), Spanish football midfielder
