= UDC Txantrea =

Association football club in Spain

Txantrea
- Full name: Unión Deportiva Cultural Txantrea Kirol eta Kultur Elkartea
- Founded: 1952
- Ground: Chantrea, Pamplona, Navarre, Spain
- Capacity: 3,500
- President: (Spain) José Luis Nagore
- Head coach: (Spain) Txiki Acaz
- League: Tercera Federación – Group 15
- 2025–26: Tercera Federación – Group 15, 11th of 18
Home colours	Away colours

Unión Deportiva Cultural Txantrea Kirol eta Kultur Elkartea (Unión Deportiva Cultural Chantrea in Spanish) is a Spanish football team based in Pamplona, in the autonomous community of Navarre. Founded in 1952, it plays in Tercera Federación – Group 15, holding home games at Estadio Chantrea, with a capacity of 3,500 seats.

Txantrea is the representative team for the neighbourhood of the same name, a working-class area with a strong sense of community identity, built in the 1950s to provide housing for migrants from rural areas of Navarre. The club has a long-term collaboration agreement with Athletic Club (renewed in 2017 for another four years) which has seen several promising players move to the Bilbao team. Recent graduates include Borja Ekiza, Iñigo Pérez, Mikel San José, Gorka Iraizoz and Iker Muniain, all of whom played a role in their run to the 2012 UEFA Europa League Final.

== Season to season ==
Season	Tier	Division	Place	Copa del Rey
1955–56	5	2ª Reg.	4th	
1956–57	4	1ª Reg.	6th	
1957–58	4	1ª Reg.	9th	
1958–59	4	1ª Reg.	3rd	
1959–60	4	1ª Reg.	4th	
1960–61	4	1ª Reg.	2nd	
1961–62	4	1ª Reg.	1st	
1962–63	3	3ª	6th	
1963–64	3	3ª	4th	
1964–65	3	3ª	8th	
1965–66	3	3ª	8th	
1966–67	3	3ª	5th	
1967–68	3	3ª	7th	
1968–69	3	3ª	18th	
1969–70	3	3ª	4th	
1970–71	3	3ª	17th	
1971–72	4	1ª Reg.	1st	
1972–73	3	3ª	18th	
1973–74	4	1ª Reg.	5th	
1974–75	4	Reg. Pref.	5th	

Season	Tier	Division	Place	Copa del Rey
1975–76	4	Reg. Pref.	8th	
1976–77	4	Reg. Pref.	5th	
1977–78	5	Reg. Pref.	1st	
1978–79	4	3ª	15th	
1979–80	4	3ª	19th	
1980–81	4	3ª	16th	
1981–82	4	3ª	20th	
1982–83	5	Reg. Pref.	2nd	
1983–84	4	3ª	16th	
1984–85	4	3ª	20th	
1985–86	5	Reg. Pref.	7th	
1986–87	4	3ª	5th	
1987–88	4	3ª	2nd	
1988–89	4	3ª	2nd	
1989–90	4	3ª	14th	
1990–91	4	3ª	7th	
1991–92	4	3ª	10th	
1992–93	4	3ª	6th	
1993–94	4	3ª	4th	
1994–95	4	3ª	7th	

Season	Tier	Division	Place	Copa del Rey
1995–96	4	3ª	7th	
1996–97	4	3ª	2nd	
1997–98	4	3ª	11th	
1998–99	4	3ª	7th	
1999–2000	4	3ª	2nd	
2000–01	3	2ª B	20th	
2001–02	4	3ª	7th	
2002–03	4	3ª	11th	
2003–04	4	3ª	12th	
2004–05	4	3ª	12th	
2005–06	4	3ª	10th	
2006–07	4	3ª	9th	
2007–08	4	3ª	9th	
2008–09	4	3ª	12th	
2009–10	4	3ª	8th	
2010–11	4	3ª	5th	
2011–12	4	3ª	6th	
2012–13	4	3ª	6th	
2013–14	4	3ª	5th	
2014–15	4	3ª	11th	

Season	Tier	Division	Place	Copa del Rey
2015–16	4	3ª	11th	
2016–17	4	3ª	10th	
2017–18	4	3ª	7th	
2018–19	4	3ª	8th	
2019–20	4	3ª	8th	
2020–21	4	3ª	9th / 2nd	
2021–22	5	3ª RFEF	3rd	
2022–23	5	3ª Fed.	14th	
2023–24	5	3ª Fed.	9th	
2024–25	5	3ª Fed.	6th	
2025–26	5	3ª Fed.	11th	
2026–27	5	3ª Fed.		

- 1 season in Segunda División B
- 50 seasons in Tercera División
- 6 seasons in Tercera Federación/Tercera División RFEF

== Famous players ==
- (Spain) Miguel Ángel Sola
- (Spain) Javi Gracia
- (Spain) José Manuel Mateo
- (Spain) David Cuéllar
- (Spain) Gorka Iraizoz
- (Spain) Mikel San José
- (Spain) Anaitz Arbilla
- (Spain) Roberto Torres Morales
- (Spain) Iñigo Pérez
- (Spain) Borja Ekiza
- (Spain) Iker Muniain
- (Spain) Íñigo Eguaras
