= David García (footballer, born 1994) =

Spanish footballer

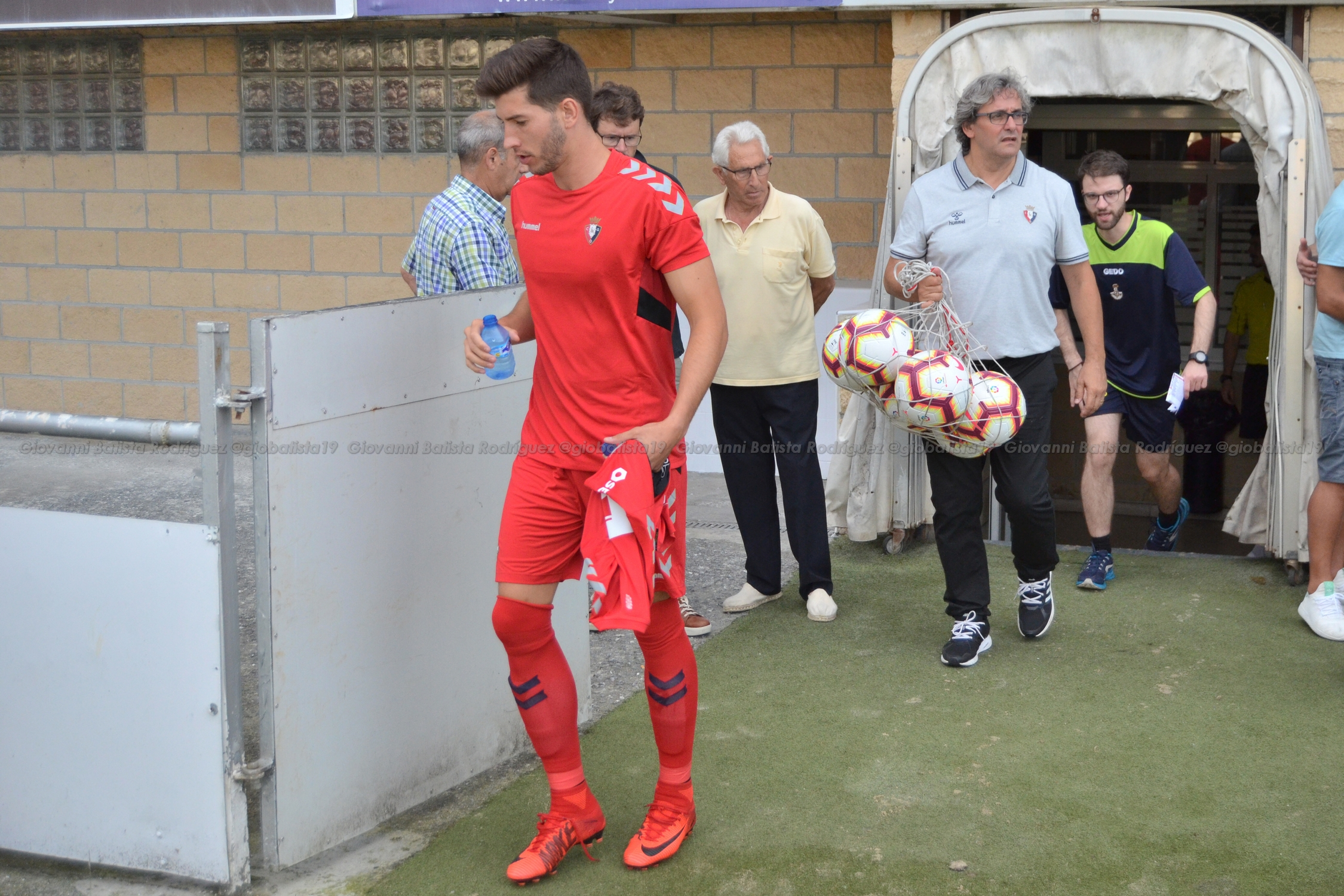

Personal information
- Full name: David García Zubiria
- Date of birth: 14 February 1994 (age 32)
- Place of birth: Pamplona, Spain
- Height: 1.85 m (6 ft 1 in)
- Position: Centre-back

Team information
- Current team: Al-Rayyan
- Number: 5

Youth career
- 2003–2013: Osasuna

Senior career*
Years	Team	Apps	(Gls)
2011–2015	Osasuna B	31	(4)
2014–2024	Osasuna	280	(13)
2018	→ Cultural Leonesa (loan)	18	(2)
2024–	Al-Rayyan	44	(2)

International career
2023	Spain	3	(0)
- * Club domestic league appearances and goals as of 01:26, 8 November 2026 (UTC)

David García Zubiria (born 14 February 1994) is a Spanish professional footballer who plays as a centre-back for Qatar Stars League club Al-Rayyan.

He spent the vast majority of his career contracted to Osasuna, making 305 appearances and winning the Segunda División in 2019.

In 2023, García played three times with Spain.

== Club career ==
=== Osasuna ===
Born in Pamplona, Navarre, García finished joined CA Osasuna's youth setup in 2003, aged nine. He made his senior debut in 2011–12 season with the reserves in the Segunda División B, but appeared more regularly for the Juvenil side.

García was called up to the main squad for the 2014 preseason by manager Jan Urban, and scored the last goal of a 4–0 win against Brentford. He played his first match as a professional on 30 August, starting in the 1–1 Segunda División away draw with Real Zaragoza.

On 26 January 2015, García agreed to an extension with the club running until 2019. He scored his first goal in the second tier on 31 May, closing the 2–0 home victory over Recreativo de Huelva. On 7 June, in the last round of the campaign and with the team needing one point to avoid a second consecutive relegation, he scored in the 78th minute of an eventual 2–2 draw at CE Sabadell FC.

García made his La Liga debut on 19 August 2016, starting in a 1–1 away draw against Málaga CF. He scored his first goal in the competition on 10 September, but in a 5–2 loss at Real Madrid.

On 17 January 2018, García was loaned to Cultural y Deportiva Leonesa of the second division until June. After returning to the El Sadar Stadium, he quickly became an undisputed starter for new coach Jagoba Arrasate, signing a new five-year contract in May 2021 and making the team of the season in 2021–22.

=== Al-Rayyan ===
On 1 August 2024, aged 30, García moved abroad for the first time in his career, agreeing to a deal at Qatar Stars League club Al-Rayyan SC for a fee of €8.75 million, with a further 2.5 million on variables.

== International career ==
García received his first call-up to the Spain national team on 17 March 2023, for UEFA Euro 2024 qualifiers against Norway and Scotland. He won his first cap 11 days later at the age of 29, playing the entire 2–0 loss in Glasgow.

== Career statistics ==
=== Club ===
As of match played 4 August 2024

Appearances and goals by club, season and competition
Club	Season	League			Copa del Rey		Other		Total	
Club	Season	Division	Apps	Goals	Apps	Goals	Apps	Goals	Apps	Goals
Osasuna B	2010–11	Segunda División B	1	0	—		—		1	0
Osasuna B	2013–14	Tercera División	25	2	—		2 (Note: Appearances in Tercera División promotion play-offs)	0	27	2
Osasuna B	2014–15	Tercera División	5	2	—		—		5	2
Osasuna B	Total		31	4	0	0	2	0	33	4
Osasuna	2014–15	Segunda División	28	2	1	0	—		29	2
Osasuna	2015–16	Segunda División	36	1	1	0	4 (Note: Appearances in La Liga play-offs)	1	41	2
Osasuna	2016–17	La Liga	25	1	2	0	—		27	1
Osasuna	2017–18	Segunda División	1	0	2	0	—		3	0
Osasuna	2018–19	Segunda División	29	2	1	0	—		30	2
Osasuna	2019–20	La Liga	32	0	0	0	—		32	0
Osasuna	2020–21	La Liga	35	1	1	0	—		36	1
Osasuna	2021–22	La Liga	35	4	1	0	—		36	4
Osasuna	2022–23	La Liga	32	2	7	1	—		39	3
Osasuna	2023–24	La Liga	27	0	2	0	3 (Note: Two appearances in UEFA Europa Conference League, one appearance in Supercopa de España)	0	32	0
Osasuna	Total		280	13	18	1	7	1	305	15
Cultural Leonesa (loan)	2017–18	Segunda División	18	2	0	0	—		18	2
Career total			329	19	18	1	9	1	356	21

=== International ===
Appearances and goals by national team and year
National team	Year	Apps	Goals
Spain	2023	3	0
Total		3	0

== Honours ==
Osasuna

- Segunda División: 2018–19
- Copa del Rey runner-up: 2022–23

Individual

- La Liga Team of the Season: 2022–23
- Opta Sports La Liga Team of The Season: 2021–22
