= Fran Mérida =

Spanish footballer (born 1990)

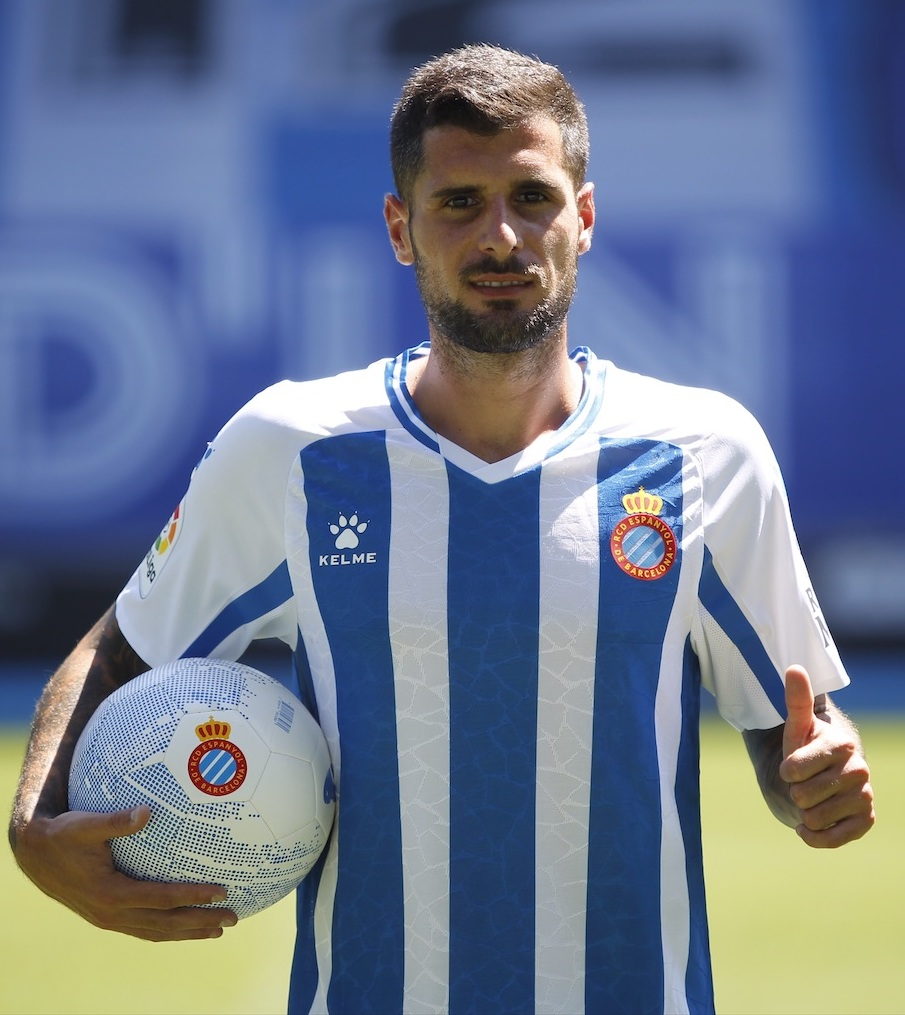
- Mérida being presented by Espanyol

Personal information
- Full name: Francisco Mérida Pérez
- Date of birth: 4 March 1990 (age 36)
- Place of birth: Barcelona, Spain
- Height: 1.75 m (5 ft 9 in)
- Position: Central midfielder

Youth career
- 1998–2005: Barcelona
- 2005–2007: Arsenal

Senior career*
Years	Team	Apps	(Gls)
2007–2010	Arsenal	6	(1)
2008	→ Real Sociedad (loan)	17	(1)
2010–2012	Atlético Madrid	20	(0)
2011	→ Braga (loan)	5	(0)
2012–2013	Hércules	18	(1)
2013–2014	Athletico Paranaense	6	(1)
2015–2016	Huesca	52	(8)
2016–2020	Osasuna	104	(9)
2020–2022	Espanyol	46	(1)
2022–2023	Tianjin Jinmen Tiger	44	(5)
2024	Lugo	13	(0)
Total		331	(27)

International career
2006–2007	Spain U17	17	(5)
2007–2009	Spain U19	17	(7)
2009	Spain U20	6	(3)
2008–2012	Spain U21	16	(6)
Medal record
Men's football
Representing Spain
U-17 World Cup
Runner-up	2007 Korea
European U-17 Championship
Winner	2007 Belgium
- * Club domestic league appearances and goals

Francisco Mérida Pérez (Spanish pronunciation: [ˈfɾam ˈmeɾiða]; born 4 March 1990) is a Spanish former professional footballer who played as a central midfielder.

He signed at the age of 17 with Arsenal from Barcelona, but only appeared in 16 official games over the course of three seasons with the club. Subsequently, he returned to his country with Atlético Madrid, where he also featured sparingly before leaving in 2012 (but winning the 2010 UEFA Super Cup). In La Liga, he also represented Osasuna and Espanyol, having other brief spells abroad in Portugal, Brazil and China.

Mérida played for Spain at youth level.

== Club career ==
=== Barcelona ===
Born in Barcelona, Catalonia, Mérida joined the youth ranks of FC Barcelona at the age of eight, but left the club in September 2005, being reportedly hidden away by his agent, Joseba Díaz, which led to speculation that he would leave with no compensation for the team; his parents had become uneasy about all the young players joining Barcelona and felt that he would have a better chance elsewhere; therefore, they approached Díaz, also Cesc Fàbregas' agent, and he promptly alerted Real Madrid, AC Milan and Arsenal, with the player eventually signing for the latter.

On 9 October 2007, Mérida was ordered by the courts to pay a fee around €3.2 million to Barcelona as compensation for his "failing to meet the terms of a personal pre-contract" with the club. The decision was said to have serious implications for clubs in England, where players were allowed to sign professional contracts at 17, one year earlier than in Spain; in response, a Madrid-based lawyer, Rodrigo García, was quoted as saying: "English teams will now think again before signing a young Spanish player ... It's an important ruling."

=== Arsenal ===
Mérida scored in his first-team debut for Arsenal in a friendly against Boreham Wood in August 2006. He signed professional terms with the Gunners after his 17th birthday.

Mérida's competitive debut came on 25 September 2007 when he came on as an added-time substitute for Eduardo da Silva in a 2–0 win against Newcastle United in the third round of the League Cup, and he went on to make two further appearances in the competition. On 3 April 2008, he extended his deal with the club by signing a long-term contract, being expected to play an important role in the future as manager Arsène Wenger described him as "an absolutely amazing player".

On 18 December 2007, Iñaki Badiola, prospective presidential candidate of Real Sociedad, claimed he agreed a loan deal for Mérida until the end of the season in Segunda División. On 9 January of the following year, five days after he won the elections, the move was confirmed. He started in seven of his 17 appearances for the Basques during his five-month spell and made six assists, but they failed to regain their La Liga status. He scored his first professional goal on 6 April 2008, the winner as his team came from behind to defeat Hércules CF 2–1 at Anoeta.

Mérida returned to Arsenal for the 2008–09 campaign, making his first start in a 6–0 victory over Sheffield United in the League Cup on 23 September 2008. On 2 March 2009, Wenger heaped praise on the player, claiming the reason for him making the bench for the previous few first team games was because "He has been doing very, very well. He looks really good in training and is getting stronger all the time."; he made his Premier League debut the following day – hours before his 19th birthday – coming off the bench for Samir Nasri in the dying minutes of a 3–1 win at West Bromwich Albion.

Mérida participated in the 2009 edition of the Emirates Cup. He replaced Aaron Ramsey midway through the second half of the team's first match, against Atlético Madrid, and started and created a goal for Eduardo against Rangers, a 3–0 win which certified the tournament's conquest. He was then included in the first team for the league season and handed shirt number 46 (later changing to 32), playing 20 minutes in the second match against Portsmouth.

On 28 October 2009, in that season's League Cup, Mérida contributed to a 2–1 home defeat of Liverpool, scoring from the edge of the area with the ball hitting the post on its way past goalkeeper Diego Cavalieri. After the game, Wenger confirmed how he came close to loan the player to Levante UD at the start of the campaign, changing his mind at the last minute because he had "too much quality" to let him leave. With his contract due to expire in June 2010, he said he was having talks with the club over a new deal and hoped they could come to an agreement, while Atlético Madrid president Enrique Cerezo showed his interest in bringing the youngster back to Spain if something wasn't worked out between player and club.

On 5 November 2009, Arsenal confirmed that Mérida had verbally agreed a deal with the club, but it had yet to be signed. Wenger then accused Atlético of tapping up the player after announcing their public interest of talking to him, saying "I can't say I'm annoyed by other clubs going after our players because we do it as well. But we do it legally." "The difference is that we do not do what is not allowed by the law. We try to get the best players everywhere when it is allowed by the rules."

Mérida made only eight official appearances for Arsenal during the season, including one against Bolton Wanderers on 17 January 2010 in which he scored his first Premier League goal in a 2–0 victory.

=== Atlético Madrid ===
On 25 May 2010, Atlético Madrid officially announced that Mérida was on his way to the Vicente Calderón Stadium on a free transfer, after refusing Arsenal's contract offer at the end of the campaign. He scored his first official goal for his new club on 27 October in a 5–0 win against Universidad de Las Palmas CF in the Copa del Rey, repeating the feat in the second leg (1–1 draw at the Vicente Calderón Stadium).

On 16 December 2010, Mérida scored his third goal for the Colchoneros, netting in his first touch in a 1–1 draw at Bayer 04 Leverkusen, with the defending champions of the UEFA Europa League crashing out after the group stage. He started 2011–12 on loan to S.C. Braga in Portugal. In late December 2011, however, after just eight official appearances (five in the Primeira Liga, 132 minutes overall), he was recalled by Atlético.

=== Hércules ===
On 8 August 2012, Mérida returned to the Spanish second division by signing a four-year deal at Hércules. His only goal during the second-tier season came from the penalty spot, against Real Madrid Castilla in a 4–2 home loss on 8 October, and he also received a straight red card in a 2–1 defeat at Real Murcia on 6 January 2013 for protesting the awarding of a spot-kick.

=== Atlético Paranaense ===
In February 2013, after rescinding his contract for a fee of €100,000, Mérida signed for one year with Brazilian side Clube Atlético Paranaense. An unused substitute for the first half of the Série A season, he made his debut on 19 September away to Clube de Regatas do Flamengo, scoring his team's first goal as they came from behind to triumph 4–2; he was the first Spaniard to score in Brazil since José Ufarte for Flamengo in 1964. A week later, in the year's Copa do Brasil, he was sent off for two bookings as a late substitute against Sport Club Internacional in the first game of the quarter-finals, being unused in both legs of the final, a 3–1 aggregate loss to Flamengo.

Mérida competed with the Furacão in the following year's Copa Libertadores, scoring in their penalty shootout victory over Sporting Cristal in the first stage. On 26 March 2014, in the group phase, he was ejected in a 3–1 home loss to Club Atlético Vélez Sarsfield. He left in July, as his contract was not extended.

=== Huesca ===
Mérida was without a club until 30 January 2015, when he signed a deal at SD Huesca until the end of the campaign in the Segunda División B. He played 15 games as they won Group B and promoted, scoring in a 2–0 win over Rayo Vallecano B at the Estadio El Alcoraz on 29 March.

On 3 December 2015, Mérida scored a penalty as his team beat top-flight club Villarreal CF 3–2 at home in the last 16 of the Spanish Cup, but in an eventual 4–3 aggregate defeat. A month later, he scored and was sent off in a 3–3 draw at neighbours Real Zaragoza.

=== Osasuna ===
On 21 July 2016, Mérida returned to the Spanish main division after agreeing to a deal with CA Osasuna. He made his debut for the club on 20 August, replacing fellow debutant Fausto Tienza and scoring the equaliser in a 1–1 away draw against Málaga CF.

Mérida contributed one goal in 31 matches in 2018–19, as his team returned to the top division as champions.

=== Espanyol ===
On 19 August 2020, the free agent Mérida moved to RCD Espanyol on a two-year contract with the option of a third. He played 36 times in his first season for the second-tier champions, but was a fringe player subsequently.

=== Later career ===
Mérida signed for Chinese Super League side Tianjin Jinmen Tiger F.C. on 5 August 2022, on a free transfer. He returned to Spain in January 2024, on a one-and-a-half-year contract at Primera Federación club CD Lugo.

On 26 September 2024, the 34-year-old Mérida announced his retirement.

== International career ==
Mérida was part of the Spain under-17 squad which won the 2007 UEFA European Championship. In July 2007 he also played for the team in the 2007 FIFA World Cup in South Korea, with the national team finishing second to Nigeria in a shootout, with him missing the second penalty of the three taken.

Mérida was called up to the under-20 side for the 2009 World Cup held in Egypt: he starred in an 8–0 drubbing of Tahiti, scoring the fifth goal and providing an assist. In the next group game he continued his fine form and netted twice in a 2–0 win over Nigeria; after resting against Venezuela he played 70 minutes in the last-16 tie against Italy, which finished with a 3–1 loss.

== Personal life ==
Mérida's sister, Sara, is also a footballer and a midfielder. She played mainly for RCD Espanyol.

== Career statistics ==
Appearances and goals by club, season and competition
Club	Season	League			Cup		League cup		Continental		Other		Total	
Club	Season	Division	Apps	Goals	Apps	Goals	Apps	Goals	Apps	Goals	Apps	Goals	Apps	Goals
Arsenal	2007–08	Premier League	0	0	0	0	3	0	0	0	—		3	0
Arsenal	2008–09	Premier League	2	0	0	0	3	0	0	0	—		5	0
Arsenal	2009–10	Premier League	4	1	1	0	2	1	1 (Note: Appearances in UEFA Champions League)	0	—		8	2
Arsenal	Total		6	1	1	0	8	1	1	0	0	0	16	2
Real Sociedad (loan)	2007–08	Segunda División	17	1	—		—		—		—		17	1
Atlético Madrid	2010–11	La Liga	17	0	5	2	—		4 (Note: Appearances in UEFA Europa League)	1	1 (Note: Appearances in UEFA Super Cup)	0	27	3
Atlético Madrid	2011–12	La Liga	3	0	0	0	—		0	0	—		3	0
Atlético Madrid	Total		20	0	5	2	—		4	1	1	0	30	3
Braga (loan)	2011–12	Primeira Liga	5	0	0	0	0	0	2	0	—		7	0
Hércules	2012–13	Segunda División	18	1	1	0	—		—		—		19	1
Athletico Paranaense	2013	Série A	6	1	4	0	—		—		—		10	1
Athletico Paranaense	2014	Série A	0	0	0	0	—		6 (Note: Appearances in Copa Libertadores)	0	—		6	0
Athletico Paranaense	Total		6	1	4	0	—		6	0	—		16	1
Huesca	2014–15	Segunda División B	15	1	0	0	—		—		6 (Note: Appearances in Segunda División B play-offs)	0	21	1
Huesca	2015–16	Segunda División	37	7	1	0	—		—		—		38	7
Huesca	Total		52	8	1	0	—		—		6	0	59	8
Osasuna	2016–17	La Liga	15	1	2	0	—		—		—		17	1
Osasuna	2017–18	Segunda División	35	7	1	0	—		—		—		36	7
Osasuna	2018–19	Segunda División	31	1	0	0	—		—		—		31	1
Osasuna	2019–20	La Liga	23	0	2	1	—		—		—		25	1
Osasuna	Total		104	9	5	1	—		—		—		109	10
Espanyol	2020–21	Segunda División	36	1	3	0	—		—		—		39	1
Espanyol	2021–22	La Liga	10	0	3	0	—		—		—		13	0
Espanyol	Total		46	1	6	0	—		—		—		52	1
Tianjin Jinmen Tiger	2022	Chinese Super League	18	4	0	0	—		—		—		18	4
Tianjin Jinmen Tiger	2023	Chinese Super League	26	1	1	0	—		—		—		27	1
Tianjin Jinmen Tiger	Total		44	5	1	0	—		—		—		45	5
Lugo	2023–24	Primera Federación	13	0	—		—		—		—		13	0
Career total			331	27	24	3	8	1	13	1	7	0	383	32

== Honours ==
Atlético Madrid

- UEFA Super Cup: 2010

Osasuna

- Segunda División: 2018–19

Espanyol

- Segunda División: 2020–21

Spain U17

- UEFA European Under-17 Championship: 2007
- FIFA U-17 World Cup runner-up: 2007
