= David Cuéllar =

Spanish footballer

Personal information
- Full name: David Cuéllar Tainta
- Date of birth: 1 November 1979 (age 47)
- Place of birth: Pamplona, Spain
- Height: 1.70 m (5 ft 7 in)
- Position: Winger

Youth career
- 1994–1995: Chantrea
- 1995–1997: Athletic Bilbao

Senior career*
Years	Team	Apps	(Gls)
1997–1998	Basconia	32	(2)
1998–2001	Bilbao Athletic	82	(7)
2000–2002	Athletic Bilbao	14	(0)
2002–2004	Elche	62	(4)
2004–2007	Gimnàstic	92	(8)
2007–2008	Athletic Bilbao	7	(0)
2008–2010	Murcia	12	(0)
2009–2010	→ Salamanca (loan)	23	(0)
2011–2013	El Morell		
2013–2014	Reus	24	(0)
2014–2015	Vilafranca	13	(1)
2015–2018	Vila-Seca		
Total		361	(22)

International career
1998	Spain U18	1	(0)
1998	Spain U20	3	(0)
- * Club domestic league appearances and goals

David Cuéllar Tainta (born 1 November 1979) is a Spanish retired footballer who played as a right winger.

== Club career ==
Born in Pamplona, Navarre, Cuéllar came through the youth ranks of Athletic Bilbao, but managed to play just 14 games without scoring from 2000 to 2002, eventually leaving the club. His debut with the first team came on 20 December 2000, coming as a late substitute in a 1–1 home draw against Valencia CF.

After two years with Elche CF and two with Gimnàstic de Tarragona in the second division, Cuéllar made a comeback to La Liga with the latter team in the 2006–07 season (scoring his first goal in the top flight on 24 September 2006 in a 2–2 home draw with Racing de Santander) before earning himself a move back to Athletic for the following campaign, where he appeared in only seven matches.

Subsequently, Cuéllar joined Real Murcia who had been just relegated to division two, appearing rarely in his first year. On 31 August 2009 he was loaned for a season to another side in that tier, UD Salamanca, being released by the former in the following off-season.

== Personal life ==
Cuéllar's older brother, Crescencio (born 1970), was also a footballer. A forward who was also brought up in Lezama, he managed four appearances in the first division, with Athletic (one match) and CP Mérida (three), plus almost 300 in the second tier. Another brother, José Luis, played at the regional third level as a defender.

== Honours ==
Basconia

- Tercera División: 1997–98
