= Brandon Thomas (footballer) =

Spanish footballer

Brandon
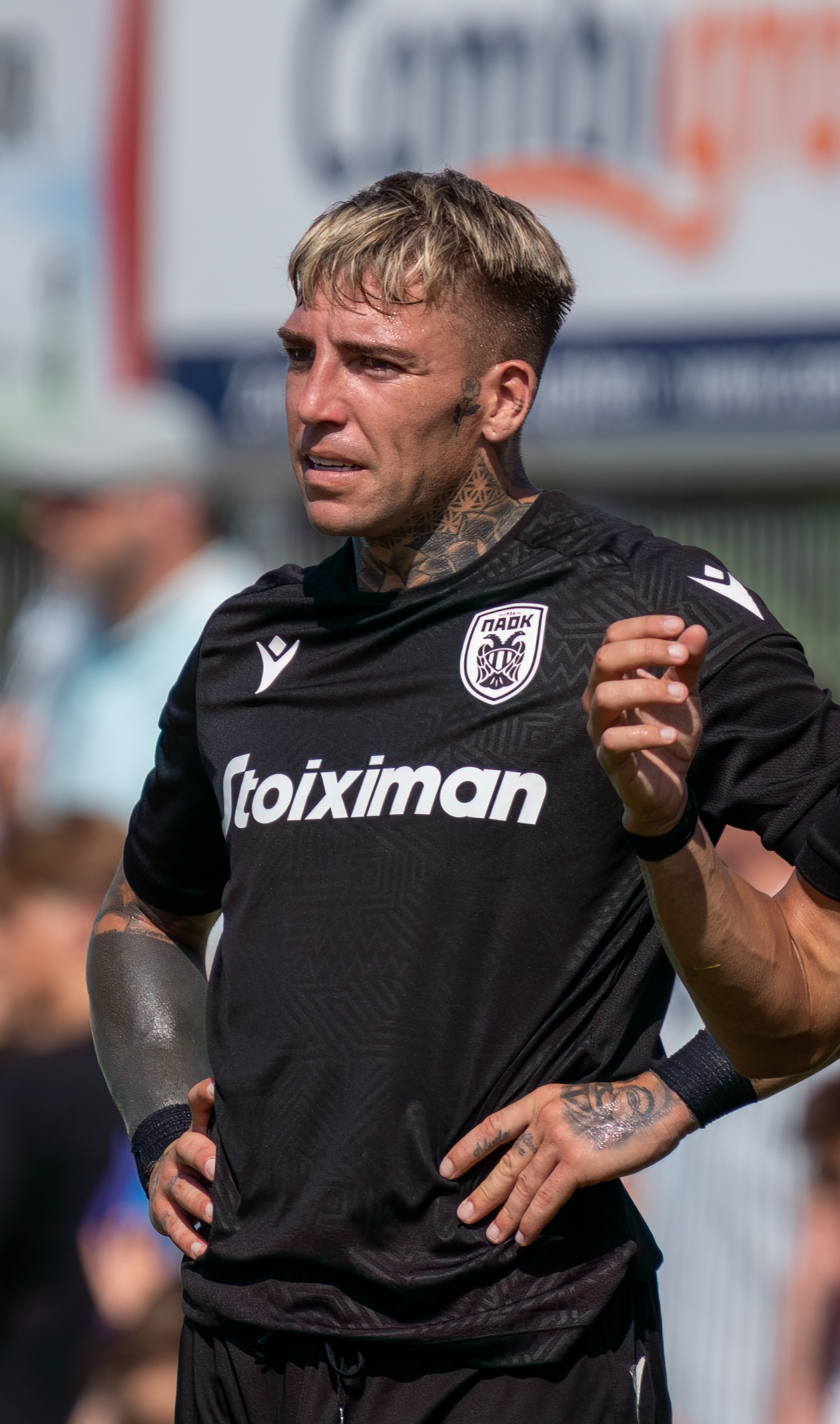
- Brandon with PAOK in 2023

Personal information
- Full name: Brandon Thomas Llamas
- Date of birth: 4 February 1995 (age 31)
- Place of birth: Santanyí, Spain
- Height: 1.73 m (5 ft 8 in)
- Position: Forward

Team information
- Current team: Apollon Limassol
- Number: 23

Youth career
- 2010–2014: Mallorca

Senior career*
| Years | Team | Apps | (Gls) |
| 2012–2015 | Mallorca B | 36 | (8) |
| 2012–2017 | Mallorca | 74 | (19) |
| 2017–2019 | Rennes | 11 | (1) |
| 2017–2018 | Rennes II | 3 | (0) |
| 2018–2019 | → Osasuna (loan) | 36 | (5) |
| 2019–2021 | Osasuna | 8 | (0) |
| 2020 | → Girona (loan) | 9 | (2) |
| 2021 | → Leganés (loan) | 5 | (0) |
| 2021–2022 | Málaga | 40 | (9) |
| 2022–2025 | PAOK | 74 | (14) |
| 2025– | Apollon Limassol | 39 | (14) |
- * Club domestic league appearances and goals as of 1 November 2026

Brandon Thomas Llamas (born 4 February 1995), known simply as Brandon, is a Spanish professional footballer who plays as a forward for Cypriot First Division club Apollon Limassol.

He played nine La Liga games for Mallorca and Osasuna but spent most of his career in the Segunda División, playing 163 games and scoring 35 goals for those two teams as well as Girona, Leganés and Málaga. He also had spells in Ligue 1 with Rennes and in Super League Greece with PAOK.

== Career ==
=== Mallorca ===
Born in Santanyí, Majorca, Balearic Islands to an English-born father of Welsh descent and a Spanish mother, Brandon is a product of RCD Mallorca's youth system. On 12 December 2012, without even appearing for the reserves, he made his professional debut, coming on as a late substitute for Alejandro Alfaro in a 5–0 home loss against Sevilla FC, for the season's Copa del Rey.

On 15 December Brandon made his La Liga debut, again from the bench in a 1–0 away defeat against Athletic Bilbao. On 9 January of the following year he scored his first professional goal, netting his team's first in a 2–1 away victory against Sevilla also for the national cup.

Brandon scored his first league goals on 24 May 2015, netting both goals for his side in a 4–2 away loss against Albacete Balompié in the Segunda División championship. In July 2015, he was definitely promoted to the main squad by manager Albert Ferrer.

On 28 January 2016, Brandon renewed his contract until 2019. On 4 June, he scored a brace in a 3–1 win at Real Valladolid, being the club's top goalscorer during the campaign with six goals as his side narrowly avoided relegation.

On 9 October 2016, Brandon scored a hat-trick in a 3–0 home win against SD Huesca, later being named Segunda División Player of the Month. He was sent off on 18 December at half time in a 3–1 loss at CD Numancia for protesting with the referee; the season ended with relegation.

=== Rennes ===
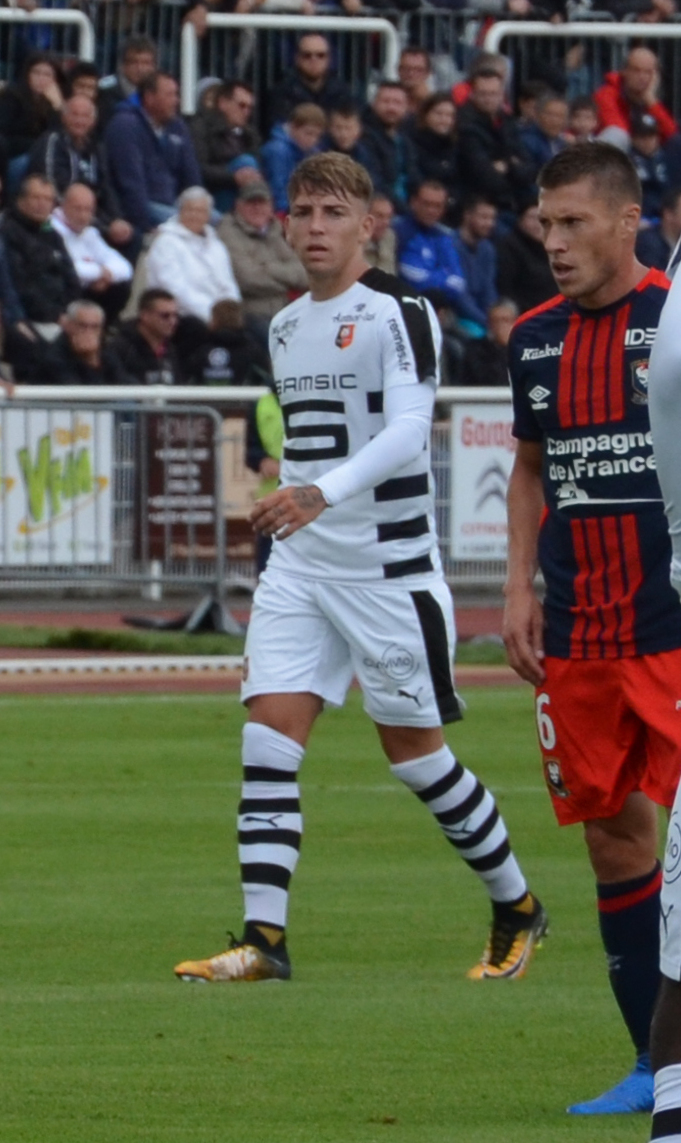
Brandon in action for Rennes in 2017

On 10 July 2017, Brandon signed a three-year deal with French side Stade Rennais FC. He did not take to the field in their first seven matches of the Ligue 1 season, and only played once in that time for the reserves in the fifth division. He made his debut on 25 October in the third round of the Coupe de la Ligue, starting and assisting Adrien Hunou's winning goal in a 2–1 victory at Dijon FCO. Three days later, in his first league game, he scored the only goal at Montpellier HSC.

=== Osasuna ===
After a season of few opportunities in France, Brandon joined CA Osasuna in July 2018 on a season-long loan that would become permanent for €2 million if the team won promotion to La Liga. On 20 May 2019, the deal was made permanent with Brandon agreeing to a three-year contract. Eleven days later, he won and scored a penalty in a 3–2 win at Córdoba CF that won the second division title for the team from Pamplona.

On 13 January 2020, Brandon was loaned to Girona FC for the rest of the second-tier season, having played just eight top-flight games for Osasuna. In March, after establishing himself as a starter at the Estadi Montilivi, he suffered a knee injury and was sidelined for the remainder of the season.

After returning to the fields in December 2020, Brandon was loaned to second division side CD Leganés on 19 January 2021, until the end of the campaign. On 15 July, after returning from loan, he terminated his contract.

=== Málaga ===
On 16 July 2021, Brandon signed a one-year contract with Málaga CF in the second division. He played all but one game in his only season on the Costa del Sol, scoring nine goals.

=== PAOK ===
On 14 July 2022, Brandon signed for one year at Super League Greece club PAOK FC. He made his debut a week later in his first European match, a 2–0 loss away to PFC Levski Sofia in the UEFA Europa Conference League second qualifying round, as a 71st-minute substitute for Georgios Koutsias. In the first league game of the season on 20 August, he scored the only goal after seven minutes at home to Panetolikos FC.

On 5 November 2023, Brandon scored a brace in a 4–2 away win against rivals Olympiacos FC.

== Career statistics ==
As of match played 30 June 2025

Appearances and goals by club, season and competition
| Club | Season | League | | | National cup (Note: Includes Copa del Rey, Greek Football Cup) | | League cup (Note: Includes Coupe de la Ligue) | | Europe | | Total | |
| Club | Season | Division | Apps | Goals | Apps | Goals | Apps | Goals | Apps | Goals | Apps | Goals |
|---|---|---|---|---|---|---|---|---|---|---|---|---|
| Mallorca B | 2012–13 | Segunda División B | 2 | 0 | — | | — | | — | | 2 | 0 |
| Mallorca B | 2013–14 | Segunda División B | 34 | 8 | — | | — | | — | | 34 | 8 |
| Mallorca B | Total | | 36 | 8 | — | | — | | — | | 36 | 8 |
| Mallorca | 2012–13 | La Liga | 1 | 0 | 2 | 1 | — | | — | | 3 | 1 |
| Mallorca | 2013–14 | Segunda División | 2 | 0 | — | | — | | — | | 2 | 0 |
| Mallorca | 2014–15 | Segunda División | 3 | 1 | — | | — | | — | | 3 | 1 |
| Mallorca | 2015–16 | Segunda División | 29 | 6 | — | | — | | — | | 29 | 6 |
| Mallorca | 2016–17 | Segunda División | 39 | 12 | 2 | 1 | — | | — | | 41 | 13 |
| Mallorca | Total | | 74 | 19 | 4 | 2 | — | | — | | 78 | 21 |
| Rennes II | 2017–18 | Championnat National 2 | 3 | 0 | — | | — | | — | | 3 | 0 |
| Rennes | 2017–18 | Ligue 1 | 11 | 1 | — | | 1 | 0 | — | | 12 | 1 |
| Osasuna (loan) | 2018–19 | Segunda División | 36 | 5 | — | | — | | — | | 36 | 5 |
| Osasuna | 2019–20 | La Liga | 8 | 0 | 1 | 1 | — | | — | | 9 | 1 |
| Osasuna | 2020–21 | La Liga | — | | 2 | 0 | — | | — | | 2 | 0 |
| Osasuna | Total | | 44 | 5 | 3 | 1 | — | | — | | 47 | 6 |
| Girona (loan) | 2019–20 | Segunda División | 9 | 2 | 1 | 0 | — | | — | | 10 | 2 |
| Leganés (loan) | 2020–21 | Segunda División | 5 | 0 | — | | — | | — | | 5 | 0 |
| Málaga | 2021–22 | Segunda División | 40 | 9 | 1 | 0 | — | | — | | 41 | 9 |
| PAOK | 2022–23 | Super League Greece | 29 | 7 | 7 | 5 | — | | 1 (Note: Appearance(s) in UEFA Europa Conference League) | 0 | 37 | 12 |
| PAOK | 2023–24 | Super League Greece | 33 | 7 | 6 | 1 | — | | 16 | 4 | 55 | 12 |
| PAOK | 2024–25 | Super League Greece | 12 | 0 | 2 | 1 | — | | 11 | 1 | 25 | 2 |
| PAOK | Total | | 74 | 14 | 15 | 7 | — | | 28 | 5 | 117 | 26 |
| Career total | | | 296 | 58 | 24 | 10 | 1 | 0 | 28 | 5 | 349 | 73 |

== Honours ==
Osasuna

- Segunda División: 2018–19

PAOK

- Super League Greece: 2023–24

Individual

- Segunda División Player of the Month: October 2016
- Greek Cup Top goalscorer: 2022–23
