= Endika Irigoien =

Spanish footballer (born 1997)

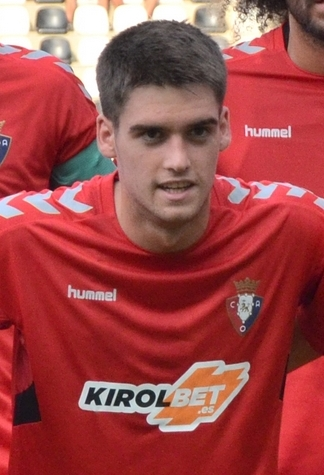
- Irigoien with Osasuna in 2018

Personal information
- Full name: Endika Irigoien Bravo
- Date of birth: 25 January 1997 (age 29)
- Place of birth: Pamplona, Spain
- Height: 1.76 m (5 ft 9 in)
- Position: Left-back

Team information
- Current team: Izarra
- Number: 3

Youth career
- Osasuna

Senior career*
Years	Team	Apps	(Gls)
2016–2021	Osasuna B	133	(2)
2018–2021	Osasuna	2	(0)
2022	Melilla	7	(0)
2022–	Izarra	77	(2)
- * Club domestic league appearances and goals as of 25 June 2025

Endika Irigoien Bravo (born 25 January 1997) is a Spanish professional footballer who plays for Izarra as a left-back.

== Club career ==
Born in Pamplona, Navarre, Irigoien represented CA Osasuna as a youth. He made his senior debut with the reserves on 29 May 2016, starting in a 1–0 home win against AE Prat for the 2016 Tercera División play-offs.

Irigoien subsequently became a regular starter for the B-side, and renewed his contract on 26 June 2018. He made his first-team debut on 12 September, starting in a 1–2 home loss against CF Reus Deportiu, for the season's Copa del Rey.

Irigoien scored his first senior goal on 27 October 2018, netting the game's only in a home success over Beti Kozkor KE. He made his Segunda División debut the following 2 March, coming on as a second-half substitute for Carlos Clerc in a 1–0 home win against Gimnàstic de Tarragona.

== Honours ==
Osasuna

- Segunda División: 2018–19
