= Juan Villar =

Spanish footballer (born 1988)

Personal information
- Full name: Juan Villar Vázquez
- Date of birth: 19 May 1988 (age 38)
- Place of birth: Cortegana, Spain
- Height: 1.82 m (6 ft 0 in)
- Position: Forward

Youth career
- Recreativo

Senior career*
Years	Team	Apps	(Gls)
2007–2009	Recreativo B	24	(11)
2008–2012	Recreativo	66	(8)
2009–2010	→ San Roque (loan)	30	(10)
2012–2015	Cádiz	108	(41)
2015–2017	Valladolid	70	(25)
2017–2018	Tenerife	25	(9)
2018–2020	Osasuna	39	(13)
2020	→ Rayo Vallecano (loan)	14	(7)
2020–2022	Almería	39	(3)
2022–2023	Huesca	7	(0)
2023	→ Córdoba (loan)	8	(1)
2023–2024	Recreativo	11	(1)
2024	San Roque	5	(1)
Total		446	(130)
- * Club domestic league appearances and goals

Juan Villar Vázquez (born 19 May 1988) is a Spanish former professional footballer who played mainly as a forward.

He began at Recreativo, playing two matches in La Liga at the start of his career, and became a regular after a loan at San Roque. Villar then contested three Segunda División B seasons for Cádiz, helping them to reach the play-offs twice before signing for Valladolid.

Over ten seasons, Villar made 246 Segunda División appearances and scored 64 goals.

== Club career ==
=== Recreativo ===
Born in Cortegana, Province of Huelva, Villar began his career with nearby Recreativo de Huelva, initially playing for their reserves. He made his professional debut on 31 August 2008, playing the final two minutes in place of Marco Ruben in a 1–0 La Liga away win against Real Betis; he made another cameo in the final game at Sporting de Gijón, as the season ended with relegation.

The following campaign, Villar was loaned to fellow Andalusian club CD San Roque de Lepe, who competed in the Segunda División B. He ranked second in his team in goals scored, this including a hat-trick in a 6–2 victory at Jerez Industrial CF on 9 May 2010. However, he also received ten yellow cards and three red, including dismissals in consecutive matches in January, the first coming in the third minute of a 0–1 home loss to Marbella FC on the 10th.

After returning to Huelva, Villar scored five goals in 30 games as they contested Segunda División. His first professional goal came on 2 March 2011, opening a 1–1 away draw against UD Las Palmas by heading Rafita's cross. He was sent off twice during the season.

=== Cádiz ===
On 23 July 2012, Cádiz CF signed Villar and fellow Recre striker Pablo Sánchez to bring their total imports for the summer up to 14. In his first season at the Estadio Ramón de Carranza, he totalled ten third-division goals from 36 appearances, including a treble on 13 January 2013 in a 3–1 win away to Loja CD.

In 2013–14, Villar scored a career-best 18 goals. On 25 May 2014, already in the promotion play-offs, he netted in a 2–1 loss at CE L'Hospitalet (also the aggregate score).

Villar struck 12 times from 30 appearances in the 2014–15 season, including twice in a 4–0 home victory over former team San Roque on 2 November 2014 where he scored after 50 seconds and then 18 minutes, before leaving with injury after 32 minutes. Cádiz reached the second stage again, and once again fell short.

=== Valladolid ===
On 2 July 2015, Villar moved out of his native region for the first time, signing a two-year deal and becoming the first purchase of the summer for second-tier club Real Valladolid. He was the Segunda División Player of the Month for December, after scoring four goals in three games: one against Deportivo Alavés, a matchwinner against Albacete Balompié and two strikes against CD Tenerife.

On 12 March 2016, Villar netted his first professional hat-trick in a 3–2 win at Real Oviedo.

=== Tenerife ===
Villar joined fellow second division side Tenerife on 29 June 2017 on a three-year contract. He scored nine league goals for them, but his contributions were hindered by injuries.

=== Osasuna ===
On 27 July 2018, Villar signed a three-year deal with CA Osasuna for a fee of €850,000 plus variables. He was the team's top scorer along with Roberto Torres, scoring 12 goals to achieve promotion to the top tier.

Villar scored his only goal in the competition on 3 November 2019, when he closed the 4–2 home defeat of Alavés through a penalty. In February 2020, he was loaned to Rayo Vallecano of the second level for the remainder of the season, netting seven times in only four months as they nearly reached the promotion playoffs.

=== Almería ===
On 11 September 2020, Villar agreed to a three-year contract with UD Almería in the second division, for €400,000 plus variables. In July 2022, after contributing just 12 appearances to earn promotion as champion, he left the club.

=== Later career ===
On 5 August 2022, Villar signed a two-year deal with SD Huesca. The following 31 January, he was loaned to Primera Federación side Córdoba CF until the end of the campaign.

Villar terminated his contract in June 2023. Two months later, he returned to Recreativo.

On 1 February 2024, the 35-year-old Villar returned to San Roque after 14 years away; the team now competed in the Segunda Federación.

== Honours ==
Osasuna

- Segunda División: 2018–19

Almería

- Segunda División: 2021–22

Individual

- Segunda División Player of the Month: December 2015
