= Lillo (footballer) =

Spanish footballer (born 1989)

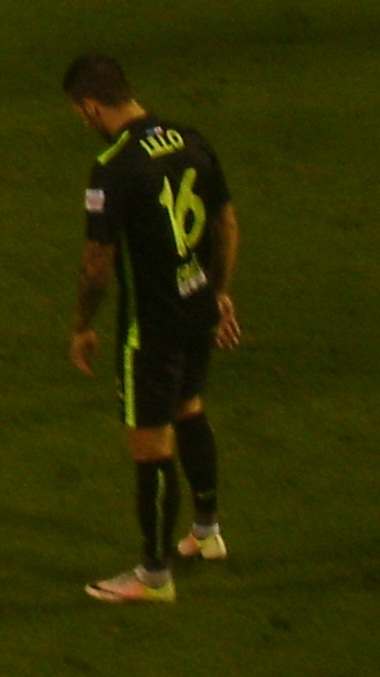

Personal information
- Full name: Manuel Castellano Castro
- Date of birth: 27 March 1989 (age 37)
- Place of birth: Aspe, Spain
- Height: 1.76 m (5 ft 9 in)
- Position: Full-back

Team information
- Current team: Melilla
- Number: 23

Youth career
- Valencia

Senior career*
Years	Team	Apps	(Gls)
2007–2010	Valencia B	45	(0)
2008–2009	→ Murcia (loan)	11	(0)
2010	Valencia	1	(0)
2010–2012	Almería B	44	(0)
2010	Almería	2	(0)
2012–2013	Alcoyano	23	(0)
2013–2016	Eibar	67	(0)
2016–2017	Sporting Gijón	25	(1)
2017–2020	Osasuna	60	(0)
2020	Maccabi Haifa	1	(0)
2020–2021	Numancia	18	(0)
2021–2023	Alcoyano	63	(0)
2023–2024	San Fernando	17	(0)
2024–2025	Águilas	15	(0)
2026–	Melilla	13	(0)

International career
2006	Spain U17	9	(0)
2007–2008	Spain U19	6	(0)
2009	Spain U20	6	(0)
- * Club domestic league appearances and goals as of 16 May 2026

Manuel Castellano Castro (born 27 March 1989), commonly known as Lillo, is a Spanish footballer who plays as a full-back for Segunda Federación club Melilla.

== Club career ==
Born in Aspe, Province of Alicante, Valencian Community, Lillo began his career with local Valencia CF, playing three seasons with the reserves. In 2006–07 and 2009–10, he totalled 23 appearances, with the team being relegated from Segunda División B on both occasions. In between, he spent the 2008–09 campaign on loan at Real Murcia CF, playing only 13 competitive games as the club finished 14th in the Segunda División.

On 21 March 2010, Lillo appeared in his first official match with the main squad, featuring the first 45 minutes of a 2–0 La Liga home win against UD Almería. In late May, as his contract with Valencia was expiring, he signed with Elche CF; however, due to a mistake from his agent, the move was declared void and, two months later, he joined Almería.

Lillo spent the vast majority of his first season with the Andalusians with the B side in the third tier, making three appearances for the first team. In November 2012, the free agent joined another side in that league, CD Alcoyano.

On 18 July 2013, Lillo moved to SD Eibar, recently promoted to the second division. He played 26 matches in his debut campaign, with the club being promoted to the top flight for the first time ever, and on 11 July 2014 renewed his link for a further year.

Lillo agreed to an extension at the Basque team on 31 December 2014, until 2017. On 5 July 2016, he mutually agreed to terminate his contract, and signed a two-year deal with Sporting de Gijón hours later. He scored his only goal in the main division on 15 January 2017, but in a 2–3 home loss to Eibar.

On 1 September 2017, the free agent Lillo joined second-tier CA Osasuna on a two-year contract. He made 19 appearances for the champions in his second season.

Until his retirement, except for a brief spell in the Israeli Premier League with Maccabi Haifa FC, Lillo competed in the Spanish lower divisions.

== Career statistics ==
As of match played 9 May 2021

Appearances and goals by club, season and competition
Club	Season	League			National Cup		Other		Total	
Club	Season	Division	Apps	Goals	Apps	Goals	Apps	Goals	Apps	Goals
Murcia (loan)	2008–09	Segunda División	11	0	2	0	—		13	0
Valencia	2009–10	La Liga	1	0	0	0	—		1	0
Almería	2010–11	La Liga	2	0	1	0	—		3	0
Almería	2011–12	Segunda División	0	0	0	0	—		0	0
Almería	Total		2	0	1	0	0	0	3	0
Alcoyano	2012–13	Segunda División B	23	0	0	0	2 (Note: Appearances in Segunda División B play-offs)	0	25	0
Eibar	2013–14	Segunda División	26	0	2	0	—		28	0
Eibar	2014–15	La Liga	31	0	2	0	—		33	0
Eibar	2015–16	La Liga	10	0	3	0	—		13	0
Eibar	Total		67	0	7	0	0	0	74	0
Sporting Gijón	2016–17	La Liga	25	1	1	0	—		26	1
Sporting Gijón	2017–18	Segunda División	0	0	0	0	—		0	0
Sporting Gijón	Total		25	1	1	0	0	0	26	1
Osasuna	2017–18	Segunda División	37	0	1	0	—		38	0
Osasuna	2018–19	Segunda División	19	0	1	0	—		20	0
Osasuna	2019–20	La Liga	4	0	0	0	—		4	0
Osasuna	Total		60	0	2	0	0	0	62	0
Maccabi Haifa	2019–20	Israeli Premier League	1	0	0	0	—		1	0
Numancia	2020–21	Segunda División B	18	0	2	0	—		20	0
Career total			208	1	15	0	2	0	225	1

== Honours ==
Eibar

- Segunda División: 2013–14

Osasuna

- Segunda División: 2018–19

Spain U20

- Mediterranean Games: 2009
