= Enric Gallego =

Spanish footballer

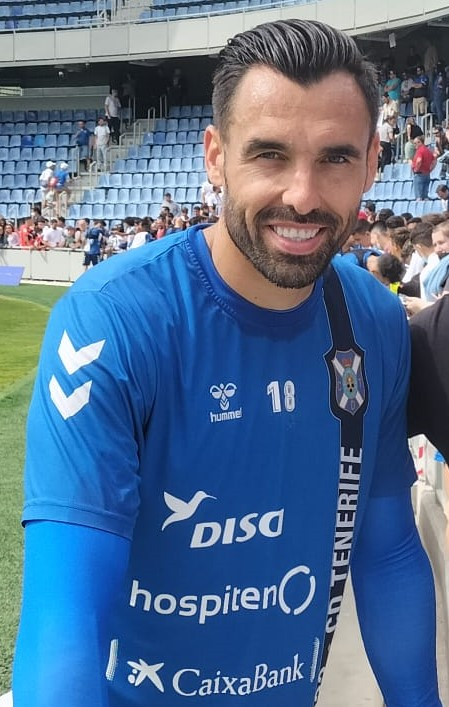
- Gallego with Tenerife in 2022

Personal information
- Full name: Enric Gallego Puigsech
- Date of birth: 12 September 1986 (age 40)
- Place of birth: Barcelona, Spain
- Height: 1.89 m (6 ft 2 in)
- Position: Striker

Team information
- Current team: Tenerife
- Number: 18

Youth career
- Buen Pastor
- Gramenet
- Badalona
- 2003–2006: Buen Pastor

Senior career*
Years	Team	Apps	(Gls)
2006–2007	Buen Pastor	8	(0)
2007–2008	Alzamora	44	(27)
2009	Premià	15	(7)
2009–2010	Espanyol B	17	(2)
2010–2013	Cornellà	100	(55)
2013–2014	Badalona	21	(2)
2014–2015	Olot	11	(0)
2015–2017	Cornellà	98	(46)
2018–2019	Extremadura	33	(25)
2019	Huesca	19	(5)
2019–2020	Getafe	5	(0)
2020	→ Osasuna (loan)	14	(3)
2020–2021	Osasuna	22	(0)
2021–	Tenerife	190	(61)
- * Club domestic league appearances and goals as of 19:44, 9 November 2026 (UTC)

Enric Gallego Puigsech (born 12 September 1986) is a Spanish professional footballer who plays as a striker for Segunda División club Tenerife.

== Club career ==
=== Early career ===
Born in Barcelona, Catalonia, Gallego had several working-class jobs alongside his amateur footballing career, such as lorry driver, builder and air conditioning installer. He made his senior debut with UD Buen Pastor in the 2006–07 season, in the regional leagues. In January 2009, he joined Tercera División club CE Premià after a prolific spell at Alzamora CF.

In June 2009, Gallego signed for RCD Espanyol and was immediately assigned to their reserves in the Segunda División B. After featuring sparingly, he moved to UE Cornellà of the fourth division, scoring five goals in a 6–0 away win against FC Ascó on 31 October 2010. He remained a regular in the following years as well as acting as captain a being a locker room reference, as his team missed out promotion in 2013.

On 8 July 2013, Gallego agreed a contract with division three side CF Badalona, where he had already played as a youth. On 25 June 2014, he moved to UE Olot in the same tier, before moving back to Cornellà the following January.

=== Extremadura ===
On 2 January 2018, Gallego joined Extremadura UD also in the third division, after the club triggered his €200,000 release clause. He scored 28 goals in total during the campaign, and achieved promotion to Segunda División with Extremadura.

Gallego made his debut as a full-time professional at the age of 31 years and 11 months on 24 August 2018, starting the 0–1 home loss against Deportivo de La Coruña. He scored his first goal in the second tier on 9 September, in a 1–3 defeat to Granada CF at the Estadio Francisco de la Hera.

On 22 September 2018, Gallego scored a hat-trick in a 4–1 away rout of CF Rayo Majadahonda, and added four goals in a 4–1 victory at CF Reus Deportiu on 17 November. He was awarded the Player of the Month accolade for December.

=== Huesca ===
On 16 January 2019, Gallego signed a two-and-a-half-year deal with La Liga strugglers SD Huesca, for a rumoured fee of €2 million. Three days later, he made his debut in the league, starting in a 0–3 home loss against Atlético Madrid. He scored his first goal in the competition on 1 February, opening an eventual 4–0 home win over Real Valladolid.

=== Getafe ===
On 8 July 2019, Gallego agreed to a three-year contract with Getafe CF after his €6 million release clause was met. His competitive bow took place on 18 August, playing 11 minutes of the 1–0 defeat at Atlético Madrid.

Gallego's maiden appearance in the UEFA Europa League occurred on 19 September 2019, as he started the 1–0 home win against Trabzonspor in the group stage.

=== Osasuna ===
On 28 January 2020, after being rarely used, Gallego was loaned to fellow top-flight CA Osasuna with an obligatory buyout clause if the team avoid relegation. In July, after this was achieved, he signed a permanent contract until 2022 for a €2 million fee.

Gallego left the El Sadar Stadium on 12 August 2021, having scored four times from 40 matches.

=== Tenerife ===
On 24 August 2021, Gallego agreed to a two-year deal at second-tier CD Tenerife. He totalled 21 goals in his first two seasons.

Team and player were relegated to Primera Federación at the end of 2024–25. Gallego then scored 19 times the following season to help them return to where they had come from at the first attempt.

== International career ==
In March 2019, Gallego was called up to the Catalonia representative team for a friendly against Venezuela. However, Huesca refused to let him and Álex Gallar take part in the match.
