= Roberto Torres (footballer, born 1989) =

Spanish footballer

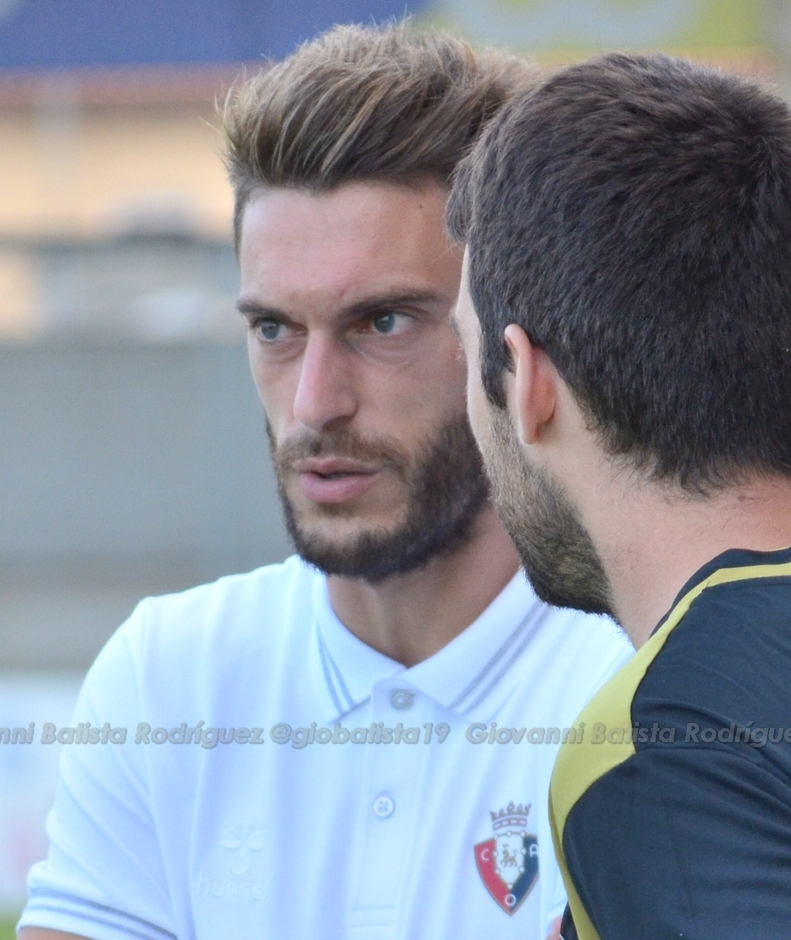
- Torres (left) before a match with Osasuna in 2018

Personal information
- Full name: Roberto Torres Morales
- Date of birth: 7 March 1989 (age 37)
- Place of birth: Pamplona, Spain
- Height: 1.78 m (5 ft 10 in)
- Position: Midfielder

Team information
- Current team: Orihuela
- Number: 10

Youth career
- 1998–2005: Txantrea
- 2005–2007: Osasuna

Senior career*
Years	Team	Apps	(Gls)
2007–2012	Osasuna B	132	(23)
2011–2022	Osasuna	322	(58)
2023	Foolad	12	(2)
2023–2024	Gol Gohar	21	(5)
2024–2025	Inter d'Escaldes	9	(1)
2025	Gimnàstic	16	(0)
2026–	Orihuela	10	(0)

International career^{‡}
2013–	Basque Country	5	(1)
- * Club domestic league appearances and goals as of 16 May 2026 ‡ National team caps and goals as of 24 March 2024

Roberto Torres Morales (born 7 March 1989) is a Spanish professional footballer who plays as a midfielder for Segunda Federación club Orihuela.

He spent the better part of his career with Osasuna, appearing in eight La Liga seasons with the club and also winning the 2018–19 Segunda División.

== Club career ==
=== Osasuna ===
Born in Pamplona, Navarre, Torres began his career with hometown club CA Osasuna. He spent five full seasons with the B side in the Segunda División B, scoring a career-best 16 goals in 35 games in 2011–12 while being deployed mainly as an attacking midfielder.

Torres made his first-team and La Liga debut on 11 December 2011, coming off the bench for Lolo for the last 20 minutes of a 1–1 away draw against Málaga CF. On 9 August of the following year, he was definitely promoted to the main squad.

Despite appearing sparingly during 2012–13, Torres was handed his first start on 1 June 2013, and netted his team's first in a 4–2 loss at Real Madrid. In the following campaign he featured more regularly and scored five times, but suffered relegation.

On 22 July 2015, Torres signed a new three-year deal with the Rojillos until 2018. He scored a team-best 12 goals during the 2018–19 season for the Segunda División champions and, consequently, agreed to an extension until 2021 with his buyout clause being set at €10 million.

Torres put an end to his 17-year spell at the El Sadar Stadium in December 2022, having made 353 official appearances.

=== Iran ===
Torres moved abroad for the first time in January 2023, with the 33-year-old signing for Foolad F.C. in the Persian Gulf Pro League. On 10 September that year, he joined Gol Gohar Sirjan F.C. of the same country and tier.

=== Later career ===
In October 2024, Torres moved to Andorran Primera Divisió club Inter Club d'Escaldes. The following 3 February, he returned to his home country on a six-month deal at Gimnàstic de Tarragona in the Primera Federación.

== Career statistics ==
As of match played 2 February 2025

Appearances and goals by club, season and competition
Club	Season	League			National Cup		Other		Total	
Club	Season	Division	Apps	Goals	Apps	Goals	Apps	Goals	Apps	Goals
Osasuna B	2007–08	Segunda División B	18	1	—		—		18	1
Osasuna B	2008–09	Segunda División B	20	1	—		—		20	1
Osasuna B	2009–10	Segunda División B	28	3	—		—		28	3
Osasuna B	2010–11	Segunda División B	31	2	—		—		31	2
Osasuna B	2011–12	Segunda División B	35	16	—		—		35	16
Osasuna B	Total		132	23	0	0	0	0	132	23
Osasuna	2011–12	La Liga	2	0	4	0	—		6	0
Osasuna	2012–13	La Liga	5	1	3	0	—		8	1
Osasuna	2013–14	La Liga	33	5	4	1	—		37	6
Osasuna	2014–15	Segunda División	37	3	1	0	—		38	3
Osasuna	2015–16	Segunda División	38	12	0	0	4 (Note: Appearances in La Liga play-offs)	0	42	12
Osasuna	2016–17	La Liga	32	7	2	0	—		34	7
Osasuna	2017–18	Segunda División	35	2	1	0	—		36	2
Osasuna	2018–19	Segunda División	39	12	1	0	—		40	12
Osasuna	2019–20	La Liga	36	7	2	0	—		38	7
Osasuna	2020–21	La Liga	35	7	4	0	—		39	7
Osasuna	2021–22	La Liga	28	2	3	1	—		31	3
Osasuna	2022–23	La Liga	2	0	2	0	—		4	0
Osasuna	Total		322	58	27	2	4	0	353	60
Foolad	2022–23	Persian Gulf Pro League	12	2	1	0	2	0	15	2
Gol Gohar	2023–24	Persian Gulf Pro League	21	5	3	2	–	–	24	7
Inter d'Escaldes	2024–25	Primera Divisió	9	1	1	1	0	0	10	2
Career total			496	89	32	5	6	0	534	94

== Honours ==
Osasuna

- Segunda División: 2018–19
