= Carlos Clerc =

Spanish footballer

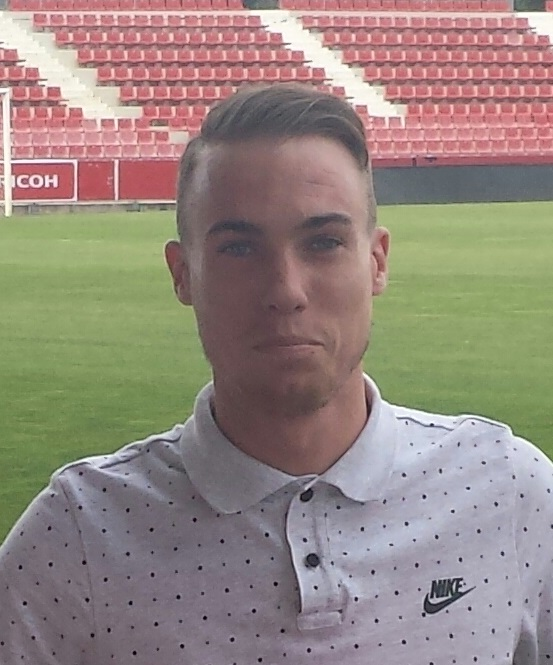
- Clerc in 2015

Personal information
- Full name: Carlos Clerc Martínez
- Date of birth: 21 February 1992 (age 34)
- Place of birth: Badalona, Spain
- Height: 1.82 m (6 ft 0 in)
- Position: Left-back

Team information
- Current team: Valladolid
- Number: 18

Youth career
- 2000–2004: Sant Gabriel
- 2004–2007: Damm
- 2007–2011: Espanyol

Senior career*
Years	Team	Apps	(Gls)
2010–2014	Espanyol B	78	(5)
2013–2016	Espanyol	1	(0)
2014	→ Sabadell (loan)	15	(0)
2015	→ Sabadell (loan)	20	(0)
2015–2016	→ Girona (loan)	44	(1)
2016–2019	Osasuna	96	(1)
2019–2022	Levante	77	(0)
2022–2025	Elche	67	(0)
2026–	Valladolid	15	(0)
- * Club domestic league appearances and goals as of 9 June 2026

Carlos Clerc Martínez (born 21 February 1992) is a Spanish professional footballer who plays as a left-back for Real Valladolid.

== Club career ==
Born in Badalona, Barcelona, Catalonia, Clerc finished his youth career with RCD Espanyol. He made his senior debut with the reserves in the 2010–11 season, in the Tercera División.

Clerc made his first-team – and La Liga – debut on 26 September 2013, starting and playing 68 minutes in a 2–1 away loss against Villarreal CF. On 31 January of the following year, he was loaned to Segunda División club CE Sabadell FC until June.

On 28 January 2015, Clerc returned to Sabadell also in a temporary deal, having failed to feature in any league matches for Espanyol in the first half of the campaign. On 15 July, he moved to Girona FC of the same league in a season-long loan.

On 19 August 2016, Clerc signed a two-year contract with CA Osasuna, newly promoted to the top tier. He scored his only goal in the competition on 9 January 2017, in a 3–3 home draw with Valencia CF.

On 27 June 2019, the free agent Clerc agreed to a three-year contract with Levante UD. In July 2022, after being relegated, he remained in the top division on a two-year deal at Elche CF.

Clerc left the Estadio Martínez Valero in January 2025, not having been able to overcome a pubis injury. On 30 January 2026, he signed a six-month contract with Real Valladolid, and agreed to a one-year extension on 7 July.

== Honours ==
Osasuna

- Segunda División: 2018–19
