= Luis Perea (footballer, born 1997) =

Spanish footballer

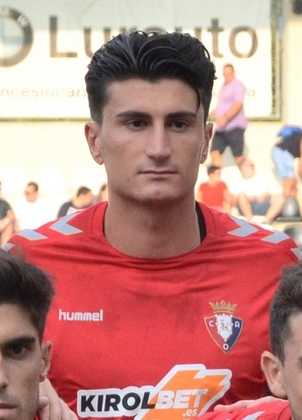
- Perea with Osasuna in 2018

Personal information
- Full name: Luis Perea Hernández
- Date of birth: 25 August 1997 (age 29)
- Place of birth: Alcalá de Henares, Spain
- Height: 1.91 m (6 ft 3 in)
- Position: Midfielder

Team information
- Current team: Olimpija Ljubljana
- Number: 6

Youth career
- Alcalá
- Atlético Madrid
- Rayo Vallecano
- 2013–2016: Atlético Madrid

Senior career*
Years	Team	Apps	(Gls)
2016–2018	Osasuna B	53	(3)
2017–2020	Osasuna	18	(1)
2020	→ Alcorcón (loan)	18	(2)
2020–2024	Leganés	67	(0)
2022–2023	→ OFI (loan)	26	(1)
2024–2025	Racing Ferrol	16	(1)
2025–2026	Arka Gdynia	19	(1)
2026–	Olimpija Ljubljana	0	(0)
- * Club domestic league appearances and goals as of 17:33, 25 May 2026 (UTC)

Luis Perea Hernández (born 25 August 1997) is a Spanish professional footballer who plays as a central midfielder for Slovenian PrvaLiga club Olimpija Ljubljana.

== Club career ==
Perea was born in Alcalá de Henares, Madrid, and represented RSD Alcalá, Atlético Madrid and Rayo Vallecano. On 20 July 2016 he moved to CA Osasuna, being initially assigned to the reserves in Segunda División B.

Perea made his senior debut on 21 August 2016, starting in a 2–0 away win against UD Somozas. He scored his first goal as a senior on 12 November, netting the first in a 4–2 home success over CD Lealtad.

Perea made his first team – and La Liga – debut on 5 April 2017, coming on as a second-half substitute for Fausto Tienza in a 1–0 away win against Deportivo Alavés. On 26 June of the following year, he signed a new three-year contract and was definitely promoted to the main squad in Segunda División.

Perea scored his first professional goal on 31 May 2019, scoring his team's third in a 3–2 away success over Córdoba CF, and helped the club in their top tier promotion with 15 appearances. The following 10 January, after featuring in only two league matches in the season, he was loaned to AD Alcorcón until June.

On 27 August 2020, Perea agreed to a five-year deal with CD Leganés, recently relegated to the second division. A starter in his first year, he subsequently fell down the pecking order before being loaned out to Super League Greece club OFI on 11 September 2022.

Upon returning, Perea was mainly a backup option during the 2023–24 campaign as Lega achieved promotion to the top tier as champions. He terminated his contract with the club on 2 August 2024, and joined Racing de Ferrol in the second level just hours later.

On 15 July 2025, Perea moved to Poland, signing a two-year contract with recently promoted Ekstraklasa club Arka Gdynia. After Arka's relegation back to the I liga was confirmed, it was announced Perea would depart the club in the summer. In total, he made 20 appearances and scored one goal for Arka.

On 28 June 2026, Perea joined Slovenian club Olimpija Ljubljana on a one-year contract, with an option for a further year.

== Honours ==
Osasuna

- Segunda División: 2018–19

Leganés

- Segunda División: 2023–24
