= 2017–18 Levante UD season =

Levante UD
2017–18 season
- President: Quico Catalán
- Head coach: Paco López
- Stadium: Ciutat de València
- La Liga: 15th
- Copa del Rey: Round of 16
- Top goalscorer: League: José Luis Morales (10); All: José Luis Morales (12)
- Highest home attendance: 23,542
- Lowest home attendance: 12,942
- Average home league attendance: 17,681
Home colours	Away colours	Third colours

During the 2017–18 season, Levante UD participated in La Liga and the Copa del Rey. This was the 109th season in Levante UD ’s history and the 12th in the Primera División.

== Squad ==
As of 1 December 2017

Note: Flags indicate national team as defined under FIFA eligibility rules; some limited exceptions apply. Players may hold more than one non-FIFA nationality.

No.	Pos.	Nation	Player
1	GK	ESP	Raúl
2	DF	ESP	Iván López (3rd captain)
3	DF	ESP	Toño
4	DF	ESP	Róber (on loan from Deportivo)
5	MF	CIV	Cheick Doukouré
6	DF	ESP	Chema
7	FW	ESP	Samu
8	MF	COL	Jefferson Lerma
9	FW	ESP	Roger
10	MF	MKD	Enis Bardhi
11	MF	ESP	José Luis Morales (2nd captain)
12	FW	TUR	Enes Ünal (on loan from Villarreal)
13	GK	ESP	Oier
14	FW	ESP	Ivi

No.	Pos.	Nation	Player
15	DF	ESP	Sergio Postigo
16	FW	ESP	Nano (on loan from Eibar)
17	FW	ESP	Álex Alegría (on loan from Betis)
18	DF	URU	Erick Cabaco (on loan from Nacional)
19	DF	ESP	Pedro López (captain)
20	MF	SRB	Saša Lukić (on loan from Torino)
21	FW	GHA	Emmanuel Boateng
22	DF	ESP	Antonio Luna
23	MF	ESP	Jason
24	MF	ESP	José Campaña
25	GK	AUS	Mitchell Langerak
26	DF	USA	Shaq Moore
31	MF	MTN	Hacen

=== Transfers ===
- List of Spanish football transfers summer 2017 § Levante

==== In ====
Date	Player	From	Type	Fee	Ref
8 June 2017	(Spain) Antonio Luna	(Spain) Eibar	Transfer	Free	
30 June 2017	(Spain) Víctor Camarasa	(Spain) Alavés	Loan return	Free	
30 June 2017	(Spain) Juan Delgado	(Spain) Hércules	Loan return	Free	
30 June 2017	(Brazil) Deyverson	(Spain) Alavés	Loan return	Free	
30 June 2017	(Spain) Álvaro Traver	(Spain) Logroñés	Loan return	Free	
1 July 2017	(Spain) Koke Vegas	(Spain) Levante B	Promoted		
1 July 2017	(Spain) Oier	(Spain) Granada	Transfer	€200,000	
1 July 2017	(Spain) Álex Alegría	(Spain) Real Betis	Loan	Free	
17 July 2017	(North Macedonia) Enis Bardhi	(Hungary) Újpest	Transfer	€1,500,000	
3 August 2017	(Spain) Róber	(Spain) Deportivo La Coruña	Loan	Free	
4 August 2017	(Ivory Coast) Cheick Doukouré	(France) Metz	Transfer	€1,600,000	
7 August 2017	(Spain) Ivi	(Spain) Sevilla Atlético	Transfer	€1,200,000	
15 August 2017	(Serbia) Saša Lukić	(Italy) Torino	Loan	Free	
16 August 2017	(Ghana) Emmanuel Boateng	(Portugal) Moreirense	Transfer	€2,000,000	
24 August 2017	(Spain) Samu	(Russia) Rubin Kazan	Transfer	Free	

==== Out ====
Date	Player	To	Type	Fee	Ref
6 June 2017	(Spain) Natxo Insa	(Malaysia) Johor Darul Ta'zim	Transfer	€400,000	
30 June 2017	(Spain) Paco Montañés	(Spain) Espanyol	Loan return	Free	
30 June 2017	(Spain) Abraham Minero	(Spain) Real Zaragoza	Loan return	Free	
30 June 2017	(Spain) Juan Muñoz	(Spain) Sevilla	Loan return	Free	
30 June 2017	(Spain) Róber	(Spain) Deportivo La Coruña	Loan return	Free	
1 July 2017	(Spain) Víctor Camarasa	(Spain) Real Betis	Transfer	€7,000,000	
5 July 2017	(Spain) Víctor	(Spain) Tenerife	Transfer	Free	
12 July 2017	(Brazil) Deyverson	(Brazil) Palmeiras	Transfer	€5,000,000	
28 July 2017	(Spain) Rubén García	(Spain) Sporting Gijón	Loan	Free	
4 August 2017	(Montenegro) Esteban Saveljich	(Spain) Albacete	Loan	Free	
7 August 2017	(Spain) Javier Espinosa	(Spain) Granada	Loan	Free	

== Competitions ==
=== Overall ===
Competition	First match	Last match	Starting round	Final position	Record							
Competition	First match	Last match	Starting round	Final position	Pld	W	D	L	GF	GA	GD	Win %
La Liga	21 August 2017	19 May 2018	Matchday 1	15th	38	11	13	14	44	58	−14	28.95
Copa del Rey	26 October 2017	11 January 2018	Round of 32	Round of 16	4	2	1	1	5	4	+1	50.00
Total					42	13	14	15	49	62	−13	30.95

Last updated: 1 May 2022
Source: Competitions

=== Liga ===
==== League table ====
Pos	Team	Pld	W	D	L	GF	GA	GD	Pts
13	Celta Vigo	38	13	10	15	59	60	−1	49 (Note: Head-to-head points: Espanyol 8, Real Sociedad 4, Celta Vigo 4 (Espanyol 2–1 Real Sociedad, Real Sociedad 1–1 Espanyol, Espanyol 2–1 Celta Vigo, Celta Vigo 2–2 Espanyol, Real Sociedad 1–2 Celta Vigo, Celta Vigo 2–3 Real Sociedad).)
14	Alavés	38	15	2	21	40	50	−10	47
15	Levante	38	11	13	14	44	58	−14	46
16	Athletic Bilbao	38	10	13	15	41	49	−8	43 (Note: Athletic Bilbao finished ahead of Leganés on head-to-head goal difference: Athletic Bilbao 2–0 Leganés, Leganés 1–0 Athletic Bilbao.)
17	Leganés	38	12	7	19	34	51	−17	43

Source: La Liga, Soccerway
Rules for classification: 1) Points; 2) Head-to-head points; 3) Head-to-head goal difference; 4) Goal difference; 5) Goals scored; 6) Fair-play points (Note: Head-to-head record is used only after all the matches between the teams in question have been played)

==== Matches ====
Win Draw Loss Fixtures

21 August 2017 1	Levante	1–0	Villarreal	Valencia
20:15 CEST (UTC+02:00)	Lerma (yellow card) 34'; Morales 88' (pen.)	Report	Trigueros (yellow card) 37'; Ruiz (yellow card) 63'; Rukavina (yellow card) 87'	Stadium: Ciutat de València; Attendance: 12,942; Referee: Alfonso Álvarez Izquierdo

26 August 2017 2	Levante	2–2	Deportivo	Valencia
20:15 CEST (UTC+02:00)	Bardhi 35'; Morales (yellow card) 68' (yellow-red card) 76'; Ivi 83' (pen.)	Report	Cartabia 5', (yellow card) 56'; Luisinho (yellow card) 11'; Sidnei 31'	Stadium: Ciutat de València; Attendance: 17,370; Referee: Javier Alberola Rojas

9 September 2017 3	Real Madrid	1–1	Levante	Madrid
13:00	Vázquez 36'; Ramos (yellow card) 54'; Carvajal (yellow card) 66'; Marcelo (red card) 89'	Report	Ivi 12'; Lerma (yellow card) 45'; Alegría (yellow card) 47'; Boateng (yellow card) 60'	Stadium: Santiago Bernabéu; Attendance: 67,789; Referee: Alejandro Hernández Hernández

16 September 2017 4	Levante	1–1	Valencia	Valencia
13:00 CEST (UTC+02:00)	Bardhi (yellow card) 37', (goal) 41'; Postigo (yellow card) 3'	Report	Parejo (yellow card) 15'; Rodrigo 31'	Stadium: Ciutat de València; Attendance: 23,084; Referee: Carlos del Cerro Grande

21 September 2017 5	Levante	3–0	Real Sociedad	Valencia
22:00 CEST (UTC+02:00)	Chema (yellow card) 6'; Bardhi (yellow card) 14', (goal) 45', 89'; Morales 75' (pen.)	Report	Llorente (yellow card) 44' (yellow-red card) 88'	Stadium: Ciutat de València; Attendance: 17,415; Referee: Jesús Gil Manzano

25 September 2017 6	Real Betis	4–0	Levante	Seville
21:00 CEST (UTC+02:00)	Sanabria 47', 90+3'; Mandi (yellow card) 51'; Fabián 55'; León 65'	Report		Stadium: Benito Villamarín; Attendance: 48,237; Referee: Pablo González Fuertes

30 September 2017 7	Levante	0–2	Alavés	Valencia
18:30 CEST (UTC+02:00)	Bardhi (yellow card) 61'; Boateng (yellow card) 78'	Report	Maripán (yellow card) 2'; Munir 33'; Vigaray (yellow card) 67'; M. García (yellow card) 71'; Medrán 81'	Stadium: Ciutat de València; Attendance: 18,528; Referee: David Fernández Borbalán

13 October 2017 8	Espanyol	0–0	Levante	Cornellà de Llobregat
21:00 CEST (UTC+02:00)	Hermoso (yellow card) 57'; Fuego (yellow card) 68'	Report	Nano (yellow card) 24'; Postigo (yellow card) 39'; Morales (yellow card) 60'	Stadium: RCDE Stadium; Attendance: 19,365; Referee: Alberto Mallenco

22 October 2017 9	Levante	1–1	Getafe	Valencia
13:00 CEST (UTC+02:00)	Lerma (yellow card) 42'; Morales 62'	Report	Arambarri (yellow card) 5'; Cala (yellow card) 14'; Fajr 58'; Portillo (yellow card) 90'	Stadium: Ciutat de València; Attendance: 17,287; Referee: Ricardo de Burgos Bengoetxea

29 October 2017 10	Eibar	2–2	Levante	Eibar
18:30 CEST (UTC+02:00)	Arbilla 51'; Charles 74'	Report	Morales 35'; Bardhi 37'	Stadium: Ipurua; Attendance: 5,098; Referee: Javier Alberola Rojas

5 November 2017 11	Levante	1–2	Girona	Valencia
12:00 CET (UTC+01:00)	Chema (yellow card) 11'; Postigo (yellow card) 70'; Lerma (yellow card) 86'; Ünal 90+2'	Report	Juanpe (yellow card) 18'; Muniesa (yellow card) 44'; B. García 58'; Maffeo (yellow card) 61'; Pons (yellow card) 72'; Stuani 83'	Stadium: Ciutat de València; Attendance: 17,524; Referee: José Luis Munuera Montero

19 November 2017 12	Las Palmas	0–2	Levante	Las Palmas
18:30 CET (UTC+01:00)	Lemos (yellow card) 57'	Report	Campaña (yellow card) 18'; Doukouré 71'; Oier (yellow card) 73'; Jason 79'; Toño (yellow card) 81'; Morales (yellow card) 89'	Stadium: Gran Canaria; Referee: Mario Melero López

25 November 2017 13	Levante	0–5	Atlético Madrid	Valencia
20:45 CET (UTC+01:00)	Chema (yellow card) 52'; Morales (yellow card) 54'	Report	Róber 5' (o.g.); Gameiro 29', 59'; Griezmann 65', 68'; Koke (yellow card) 90+2'	Stadium: Ciutat de València; Attendance: 21,549; Referee: Daniel Trujillo Suárez

1 December 2017 14	Málaga	0–0	Levante	Málaga
21:00 CET (UTC+01:00)	Hernández (yellow card) 30'	Report	Samu (yellow card) 36'; Bardhi (yellow card) 51'; Campaña (yellow card) 90+1'	Stadium: La Rosaleda; Attendance: 18,172; Referee: Ricardo de Burgos Bengoetxea

10 December 2017 15	Levante	1–2	Athletic Bilbao	Valencia
18:30 CET (UTC+01:00)	Toño (yellow card) 4'; Laporte 73' (o.g.); Campaña (yellow card) 79'; Chema (yellow card) 79'	Report	Aduriz 5' (pen.); García (yellow card) 40'; Rico (yellow card) 69'; Vesga (yellow card) 76'; Postigo 79' (o.g.)	Stadium: Ciutat de València; Attendance: 18,005; Referee: Xavier Estrada Fernández

15 December 2017 16	Sevilla	0–0	Levante	Seville
21:00 CET (UTC+01:00)	Lenglet (yellow card) 72'; Vázquez (yellow card) 76'	Report	Campaña (yellow card) 47'; Lukić (yellow card) 50'; Luna (yellow card) 60'	Stadium: Ramón Sánchez Pizjuán; Attendance: 25,803; Referee: Ignacio Iglesias Villanueva

19 December 2017 17	Levante	0–0	Leganés	Valencia
21:30 CET (UTC+01:00)	Lerma (yellow card) 35'; Campaña (yellow card) 50' (yellow-red card) 90+4'; Bardhi (yellow card) 77'; Morales (yellow card) 90+2'; Cabaco (yellow card) 90+5'	Report	Dos Santos (yellow card) 23'; Gumbau (yellow card) 61'; Amrabat (yellow card) 63' (yellow-red card) 68'; Zaldúa (yellow card) 68'; Beauvue (yellow card) 80'	Stadium: Ciutat de València; Attendance: 14,270; Referee: (Spain) Santiago Jaime

7 January 2018 18	Barcelona	3–0	Levante	Barcelona
16:15 CET (UTC+01:00)	Messi 12'; Suárez 38'; Paulinho 90+3'	Report	Lerma (yellow card) 8'; Sergio Postigo (yellow card) 31'; Boateng (yellow card) 70'; Róber (yellow card) 84'	Stadium: Camp Nou; Attendance: 54,617; Referee: (Spain) Carlos del Cerro Grande

14 January 2018 19	Levante	0–1	Celta de Vigo	Valencia
12:00 CET (UTC+01:00)	Morales (yellow card) 21'; Doukouré (yellow card) 80'; Luna (yellow card) 87'; Coke (yellow card) 88'	Report	Sisto 37'; Hernández (yellow card) 78'; M. Gómez (yellow card) 86'; Blanco (yellow card) 90+4'	Stadium: Ciutat de València; Attendance: 16,732; Referee: Alfonso Álvarez Izquierdo

20 January 2018 20	Villarreal	2–1	Levante	Villarreal
18:30 CET (UTC+01:00)	Trigueros 26' (pen.); Costa (yellow card) 39'; Cheryshev 50'; Álvaro (yellow card) 87'	Report	Lukić (yellow card) 31'; Postigo (yellow card) 64'; Roger 90+4' (pen.)	Stadium: La Cerámica; Attendance: 16,773; Referee: José González González

27 January 2018 21	Deportivo La Coruña	2–2	Levante	A Coruña
13:00 CET (UTC+01:00)	Borges (yellow card) 3' (yellow-red card) 34'; Luisinho (yellow card) 17'; Adrián 19'; Andone 45', (yellow card) 85'; Guilherme (yellow card) 72'; Schär (yellow card) 88'; Rubén (yellow card) 88'	Report	Lerma (yellow card) 30'; Doukouré (yellow card) 36'; Chema (yellow card) 48'; Campaña (yellow card) 57'; Roger (yellow card) 61'; Ivi 80', 84'	Stadium: Abanca-Riazor; Attendance: 20,160; Referee: Pablo González Fuertes

3 February 2018 22	Levante	2–2	Real Madrid	Valencia
20:45 CET (UTC+01:00)	Doukouré (yellow card) 13'; Ivi (yellow card) 26'; Boateng 42'; Coke (yellow card) 88'; Pazzini 89'	Summary	Ramos 11', (yellow card) 21'; Isco 81'; Asensio (yellow card) 84'; Varane (yellow card) 90+1'	Stadium: Ciutat de València; Attendance: 23,542; Referee: Mario Melero López

11 February 2018 23	Valencia	3–1	Levante	Valencia
20:45 CET (UTC+01:00)		[Report]		Attendance: 38,199

18 February 2018 24	Real Sociedad	3–0	Levante	San Sebastián
12:00 CET (UTC+01:00)		[Report]		Attendance: 18,189

26 February 2018 25	Levante	0–2	Real Betis	Valencia
21:00 CET (UTC+01:00)		[Report]		Attendance: 16,545

1 March 2018 26	Alavés	1–0	Levante	Vitoria-Gasteiz
21:30 CET (UTC+01:00)		[Report]		Attendance: 16,812

4 March 2018 27	Levante	1–1	Espanyol	Valencia
12:00 CET (UTC+01:00)		[Report]		Attendance: 17,143

10 March 2018 28	Getafe	0–1	Levante	Getafe
18:30 CET (UTC+01:00)	Bruno (yellow card) 33'; Amath (yellow card) 61'; Suárez (yellow card) 82'; Jorge Molina (footballer) (yellow card) 88'	Report	Campaña (yellow card) 3'; Cabaco (yellow card) 33'; López (yellow card) 34'; Ivi (yellow card) 37'; Coke (yellow card) 40', (goal) 79'; Koke (red card) 83'; Bardhi (yellow card) 90+3'	Stadium: Coliseum Alfonso Pérez; Attendance: 8,136; Referee: Daniel Jesús Trujillo Suárez

16 March 2018 29	Levante	2–1	Eibar	Valencia
21:00 CEST (UTC+02:00)	Cabaco (yellow card) 19'; Roger 25', (yellow card) 34'; Lerma (yellow card) 61'; Boateng 64'; Lukić (yellow card) 90+2'	Report	García (yellow card) 33'; Charles 63', (yellow card) 69'; Arbilla (yellow card) 90+4'	Stadium: Ciutat de València; Attendance: 16,028; Referee: Ignacio Iglesias

31 March 2018 30	Girona	1–1	Levante	Girona
13:00 CEST (UTC+02:00)	Granell 54'; Maffeo (yellow card) 90+1'	Report	Roger (yellow card) 28'; Cabaco (yellow card) 29'; Morales 68'; Lerma (yellow card) 78'	Stadium: Montilivi; Attendance: 11,391; Referee: Ricardo de Burgos Bengoetxea

8 April 2018 31	Levante	2–1	Las Palmas	Valencia
12:00 CEST (UTC+02:00)	Morales (yellow card) 25'; Coke 35', (yellow card) 61' (yellow-red card) 86'; Róber Pier (yellow card) 54'; Campaña 90+2', (yellow card) 90+3'; Rochina (red card) 90+3'	Report	Castellano (yellow card) 12'; Aguirregaray (yellow card) 35'; García 50'; Gálvez (yellow card) 68'	Stadium: Ciutat de València; Attendance: 18,402; Referee: David Fernández Borbalán

15 April 2018 32	Atlético Madrid	3–0	Levante	Madrid
16:15 CEST (UTC+02:00)	Hernandez (yellow card) 29'; Correa 33'; Griezmann (yellow card) 41', (goal) 48'; F. Torres 77'	Report	López (yellow card) 34'	Stadium: Wanda Metropolitano; Attendance: 58,043; Referee: Jesús Gil Manzano

19 April 2018 33	Levante	1–0	Málaga	Valencia
21:30 CEST (UTC+02:00)	Lerma (yellow card) 37'; Boateng 90+3'	Report	Adrián (yellow card) 90+2'	Stadium: Ciutat de València; Attendance: 17,372; Referee: Santiago Jaime Latre

23 April 2018 34	Athletic Bilbao	1–3	Levante	Bilbao
21:00 CEST (UTC+02:00)	García 8', (yellow card) 53'; Iturraspe (yellow card) 41'; Núñez (yellow card) 88'	Report	Bardhi 42', 44', (yellow card) 45'; Lerma (yellow card) 55'; Jason (yellow card) 89'; Morales 90'	Stadium: San Mamés; Attendance: 24,587; Referee: José Luis Munuera Montero

27 April 2018 35	Levante	2–1	Sevilla	Valencia
21:00 CEST (UTC+02:00)	Roger 11'; Morales 74'; Luna (yellow card) 77'	Report	Fernández 16'; Sarabia (yellow card) 87'	Stadium: Ciutat de València; Attendance: 17,240; Referee: González González

7 May 2018 36	Leganés	0–3	Levante	Leganés
21:00 CEST (UTC+02:00)	Pérez (yellow card) 19'; Amrabat (yellow card) 41'; Zaldúa (red card) 57'; Bustinza (yellow card) 61'; Rico (yellow card) 74'; Ramos (yellow card) 79'	Report	Jason (yellow card) 35'; Morales 55'; Bardhi 59'; Coke 77'	Stadium: Butarque; Attendance: 7,832; Referee: José María Sánchez Martínez

13 May 2018 37	Levante	5–4	Barcelona	Valencia
20:45 CEST (UTC+02:00)	Boateng 9', 30', 49', (yellow card) 37'; Bardhi (yellow card) 22', (goal) 46', 56'; Coke (yellow card) 62'; Campaña (yellow card) 70'; Lerma (yellow card) 88'; Pazzini (yellow card) 90+3'	Report	Vermaelen (yellow card) 20'; Coutinho 38', 59', 64'; Busquets (yellow card) 65'; L. Suárez 71' (pen.), (yellow card) 88'; D. Suárez (yellow card) 89'; Mina (yellow card) 90+4'; Piqué (yellow card) 90+4'; Alba (yellow card) 90+5'	Stadium: Ciutat de València; Attendance: 22,384; Referee: Mario Melero López

19 May 2018 38	Celta de Vigo	4–2	Levante	Vigo
13:00 CEST (UTC+02:00)	Gómez 29', 63', (yellow card) 89'; Aspas 41', 48'	Report	Rochina 12'; Cabaco (yellow card) 22'; Luna (yellow card) 35'; Chema (yellow card) 35'; Morales 74'	Stadium: Balaídos; Attendance: 10,480; Referee: Ricardo de Burgos Bengoetxea

=== Copa del Rey ===
==== Round of 32 ====
26 October 2017 First leg	Girona	0–2	Levante	Girona
20:30 CEST	Ramalho (yellow card) 7'; Kayode (yellow card) 78'	Report	Lukić (yellow card) 1'; Samu (yellow card) 31'; Boateng 40'; Morales (yellow card) 45'; Doukouré 62'; Ivi (yellow card) 90+1'	Stadium: Montilivi; Attendance: 6,446; Referee: José María Sánchez Martínez

28 November 2017 Second leg	Levante	1–1 (3–1 agg.)	Girona	Valencia
21:30 CET	Douglas Luiz (yellow card) 44'	Report	Hacen (yellow card) 51'; Cabaco (yellow card) 61'; Morales 75'; Jason (yellow card) 82'; Samu (yellow card) 90'	Stadium: Ciutat de València; Attendance: 6,858; Referee: Alberto Undiano Mallenco

==== Round of 16 ====
4 January 2018 First Leg	Espanyol	1–2	Levante	Cornellà de Llobregat
21:00 CET	Gerard 28'; Piatti (yellow card) 53'; Darder (yellow card) 85'	Report	Cabaco (yellow card) 29'; Morales 38' (pen.); Bardhi (yellow card) 53'; Lerma (yellow card) 70'; Ivi 74'	Stadium: RCDE Stadium; Attendance: 12,602; Referee: David Fernández Borbalán

11 January 2018 Second Leg	Levante	0–2 (2–3 agg.)	Espanyol	Valencia
19:30 CET	Lukić (yellow card) 42'; Boateng (yellow card) 61'	Report	Baptistão 14'; Hermoso (yellow card) 21'; Gerard 34'	Stadium: Ciutat de València; Attendance: 9,978; Referee: Jesús Gil Manzano

== Statistics ==
=== Appearances and goals ===
Last updated on 20 May 2018.

No.	Pos	Nat	Player	Total		La Liga		Copa del Rey	
No.	Pos	Nat	Player	Apps	Goals	Apps	Goals	Apps	Goals
Goalkeepers
1	GK	(Spain) ESP	Raúl	13	0	11	0	2	0
13	GK	(Spain) ESP	Oier	27	0	26	0	1	0
25	GK	(Spain) ESP	Koke Vegas	1	0	1	0	0	0
Defenders
2	DF	(Spain) ESP	Iván López	3	0	3	0	0	0
3	DF	(Spain) ESP	Toño	15	0	12	0	3	0
4	DF	(Spain) ESP	Róber	27	0	19+6	0	1+1	0
6	DF	(Spain) ESP	Chema	27	1	23+2	1	1+1	0
12	DF	(Spain) ESP	Coke	18	3	16+1	3	1	0
15	DF	(Spain) ESP	Sergio Postigo	32	1	27+3	1	2	0
18	DF	(Uruguay) URU	Erick Cabaco	18	0	12+2	0	4	0
19	DF	(Spain) ESP	Pedro López	22	0	18+3	0	1	0
22	DF	(Spain) ESP	Antonio Luna	24	0	22+1	0	1	0
26	DF	(United States) USA	Shaq Moore	8	0	5+1	0	2	0
30	DF	(Mauritania) MTN	Aly Abeid	1	0	1	0	0	0
Midfielders
5	MF	(Spain) ESP	Cheick Doukouré	21	2	12+7	1	1+1	1
8	MF	(Colombia) COL	Jefferson Lerma	28	0	25+1	0	1+1	0
10	MF	(North Macedonia) MKD	Enis Bardhi	30	9	16+10	9	3+1	0
11	MF	(Spain) ESP	José Luis Morales	39	12	35	10	2+2	2
16	DF	(Spain) ESP	Rubén Rochina	5	1	1+4	1	0	0
20	MF	(Serbia) SRB	Saša Lukić	18	0	12+4	0	2	0
23	MF	(Spain) ESP	Jason	29	1	22+5	1	2	0
24	MF	(Spain) ESP	José Campaña	38	1	33+2	1	3	0
31	MF	(Mauritania) MTN	Hacen	3	0	1+1	0	1	0
34	MF	(Ivory Coast) CIV	Youssouf Yalike	1	0	0	0	0+1	0
Forwards
7	FW	(Albania) ALB	Armando Sadiku	6	0	4+2	0	0	0
9	FW	(Spain) ESP	Roger	17	3	10+7	3	0	0
14	FW	(Spain) ESP	Ivi	32	5	17+12	4	0+3	1
17	FW	(Italy) ITA	Giampaolo Pazzini	9	1	5+4	1	0	0
21	FW	(Ghana) GHA	Emmanuel Boateng	29	7	10+15	6	3+1	1
25	FW	(Saudi Arabia) KSA	Fahad Al-Muwallad	2	0	0+2	0	0	0
—	FW	(Spain) ESP	Álex Alegría	9	0	8+1	0	0	0
Players who have made an appearance or had a squad number this season but have left the club
7	FW	(Spain) ESP	Samu	15	0	2+9	0	4	0
12	FW	(Turkey) TUR	Enes Ünal	7	1	7	1	0	0
16	FW	(Spain) ESP	Nano	11	0	2+7	0	2	0
25	GK	(Australia) AUS	Mitchell Langerak	1	0	0	0	1	0

=== Cards ===
Accounts for all competitions. Last updated on 22 December 2017.

No.	Pos.	Name	Yellow card	Red card
3	DF	(Spain) Toño	2	0
6	DF	(Spain) Chema	4	0
7	FW	(Spain) Samu	2	0
8	MF	(Colombia) Jefferson Lerma	6	0
10	MF	(North Macedonia) Enis Bardhi	5	0
11	MF	(Spain) José Luis Morales	6	1
13	GK	(Spain) Oier	1	0
14	FW	(Spain) Ivi	2	0
15	DF	(Spain) Sergio Postigo	3	0
16	FW	(Spain) Nano	1	0
17	FW	(Spain) Álex Alegría	1	0
18	DF	(Uruguay) Erick Cabaco	1	0
19	DF	(Spain) Pedro López	1	0
20	MF	(Serbia) Saša Lukić	3	0
21	FW	(Ghana) Emmanuel Boateng	2	0
24	MF	(Spain) José Campaña	5	1

=== Clean sheets ===
Last updated on 22 December 2017.

Number	Nation	Name	Matches Played	La Liga	Copa del Rey	Total
1	(Spain)	Raúl	11	3	0	3
13	(Spain)	Oier	7	4	1	5
25	(Australia)	Mitchell Langerak	0	0	0	0
TOTALS				7	1	8
