= 2014–15 Levante UD season =

Levante UD
2014–15 season
- President: Quico Catalán
- Head coach: José Luis Mendilibar (until 20 October); Lucas Alcaraz (from 21 October)
- Stadium: Ciutat de València
- La Liga: 14th
- Copa del Rey: Round of 16
- Top goalscorer: League: David Barral (11); All: David Barral (13)
- Highest home attendance: 12,600 vs Villarreal (24 August 2014)
- Lowest home attendance: 12,600 vs Villarreal (24 August 2014)
- Average home league attendance: 12,600
Home colours	Away colours	Third colours

The 2014–15 season was the 106th season in Levante’s history and the 10th in the top-tier.

== Squad statistics ==
=== Appearances and goals ===
No.	Pos	Nat	Player	Total		La Liga		Copa del Rey	
No.	Pos	Nat	Player	Apps	Goals	Apps	Goals	Apps	Goals
Goalkeepers
1	GK	(Spain) ESP	Jesús Fernández	10	0	6	0	4	0
13	GK	(Spain) ESP	Diego Mariño	32	0	32	0	0	0
Defenders
2	DF	(Spain) ESP	Iván López	26	0	23+3	0	0	0
3	DF	(Spain) ESP	Toño	26	0	20+2	0	4	0
4	DF	(Spain) ESP	David Navarro	21	0	21	0	0	0
6	DF	(Greece) GRE	Loukas Vyntra	27	0	26+1	0	0	0
12	DF	(Spain) ESP	Juanfran (c)	21	1	16+1	0	4	1
14	DF	(Spain) ESP	Iván Ramis	13	0	13	0	0	0
15	DF	(Greece) GRE	Nikos Karabelas	14	0	12+2	0	0	0
19	DF	(Spain) ESP	Pedro López	14	0	10	0	4	0
25	DF	(Spain) ESP	José Mari	14	0	6+8	0	0	0
Midfielders
8	MF	(Morocco) MAR	Nabil El Zhar	21	1	5+12	1	3+1	0
10	MF	(Spain) ESP	Rubén García	30	1	13+14	1	2+1	0
11	MF	(Spain) ESP	José Luis Morales	36	3	33+3	3	0	0
17	MF	(Spain) ESP	Jordi Xumetra	22	0	11+7	0	2+2	0
21	MF	(Austria) AUT	Andreas Ivanschitz	20	1	16+4	1	0	0
22	MF	(Mali) MLI	Mohamed Sissoko	21	0	12+9	0	0	0
23	MF	(Senegal) SEN	Pape Diop	19	0	18+1	0	0	0
24	MF	(Mozambique) MOZ	Simão Mate	29	1	24+3	1	1+1	0
26	MF	(Spain) ESP	Víctor Camarasa	28	2	20+4	2	3+1	0
30	MF	(Spain) ESP	Jason	2	0	0+2	0	0	0
Forwards
5	FW	(Nigeria) NGR	Kalu Uche	16	5	9+7	5	0	0
7	FW	(Spain) ESP	David Barral	38	13	32+3	11	0+3	2
9	FW	(Brazil) BRA	Rafael Martins	17	1	2+11	1	4	0
18	FW	(Spain) ESP	Víctor Casadesús	35	8	26+9	8	0	0
40	FW	(Spain) ESP	Juan Delgado	1	0	0	0	0+1	0
Players transferred out during the season
5	DF	(Spain) ESP	Héctor Rodas	10	0	6+1	0	3	0
14	MF	(Spain) ESP	Jaime Gavilán	6	0	1+1	0	4	0
16	DF	(Morocco) MAR	Issam El Adoua	8	1	3+1	0	4	1
20	MF	(Spain) ESP	Víctor Pérez	8	0	2+3	0	2+1	0

Last updated: 30 May 2015
Source: BDFutbol

=== Transfer in ===
Number	Position	Name	Age	Moving from	Type	Transfer window	Source
14	MF	(Spain) Jaime Gavilán	29	Getafe	Transfer	Summer	LevanteUD.com
9	FW	(Brazil) Rafael Martins	25	(Brazil) Audax São Paulo	Transfer	Summer	LevanteUD.com
—	MF	(Spain) Víctor Pérez	26	Valladolid	Loan	Summer	LevanteUD.com
—	GK	(Spain) Jesus Fernandez	25	Real Madrid	Transfer	Summer	LevanteUD.com
—	GK	(Spain) Diego Mariño	24	Valladolid	Transfer	Summer	LevanteUD.com
—	DF	(Spain) Toño García	24	Recreativo	Transfer	Summer	LevanteUD.com

=== Transfer out ===
Number	Position	Name	Age	Moving to	Type	Transfer window	Source
1	GK	(Costa Rica) Keylor Navas	27	Real Madrid	Transfer	Summer	LevanteUD.com
20	MF	(Spain) Pedro Rios	32	Recreativo Huelva	Contract termination	Summer	LevanteUD.com
9	FW	(Spain) Ángel	27	Eibar	Transfer	Summer	LevanteUD.com
25	DF	(Spain) Nagore	33	Alcorcón	Transfer	Summer	LevanteUD.com
18	MF	(Portugal) Sergio Pinto	33	(Germany) Fortuna Düsseldorf	Contract termination	Summer	LevanteUD.com
14	DF	(Spain) Miguel Pallardó	27	(Scotland) Heart of Midlothian	Contract termination	Summer	LevanteUD.com
10	FW	(Senegal) Baba Diawara	26	Sevilla	Loan return	Summer	LevanteUD.com
–	FW	(Spain) Roger Martí	22	Valladolid	Loan	Summer	RealValladolid.es
3	FW	(Cameroon) Aloys Nong	30	(Iran) Foolad	Contract termination	Summer	LevanteUD.com
1	GK	(Spain) Javi Jiménez	27	Alcorcón	Loan	Summer	LevanteUD.com

== Competitions ==
=== Overall ===
As of 2 September 2014

Competition	Started round	Current position/round	Final position	First match	Last match
La Liga	—	20th		24 August 2014	25 May 2015
Copa del Rey	Round of 32

=== Friendlies ===
Round	Date	Time	Opponent	Location	Score	Scorer	Referee
Friendly	22 July 2014	20:00	(Spain) Teruel	Pinilla, Teruel	5–0	Pedro López 14', Xumetra 18', Casadesús 35', 39', Ivanschitz 82'	Danier Torner (Spain)
Friendly	26 July 2014	16:00	(Netherlands) Vitesse Arnhem	Sportveld Driel, Driel	1–1	Barral 32'	Jochem Kamphuis (Netherlands)
Friendly	29 July 2014	19:30	(Netherlands) Barendrecht	Sportpark De Bongerd, Barendrecht	2–1	Morales 42', Casadesús 78'	Van Dyck (Netherlands)
Friendly	2 August 2014	19:30	(Netherlands) Heerenveen	Abe Lenstra Stadion, Heerenveen	1–0	Casadesús 58'	Eric Braamhaar (Netherlands)
Friendly	3 August 2014	14:30	(Netherlands) ADO Den Haag	Kyocera Stadion, The Hague	0–2		Richard Liesveld (Netherlands)
Friendly	8 August 2014	20:00	(Spain) Real Murcia	Pinatar Arena, Murcia	PPD
Friendly	9 August 2014	20:30	(Spain) Albacete	Carlos Belmonte, Albacete	0–2		Muñoz Mayordomo (Spain)
Friendly	13 August 2014	22:00	(Spain) Elche	Ciutat de València, Valencia	0–0		Juan Martínez Munuera (Spain)
Friendly	3 September 2014	20:30	(Spain) Almansa	Polideportivo Municipal, Almansa	6–0	Ivanschitz 10', Rubén García 16', Rafael 32', Casadesús 44', Pedro López 66', Barral 87'	Ruiz Alonso (Spain)

=== Primera División ===
==== League table ====
Pos	Team	Pld	W	D	L	GF	GA	GD	Pts	Qualification or relegation
12	Real Sociedad	38	11	13	14	44	51	−7	46	
13	Elche (Note: Elche administratively relegated by the LFP.) (R)	38	11	8	19	35	62	−27	41	Relegation to Segunda División
14	Levante	38	9	10	19	34	67	−33	37 (Note: Levante ahead on head-to-head record; Levante–Getafe 1–1, Getafe–Levante 0–1.)	
15	Getafe	38	10	7	21	33	64	−31	37	
16	Deportivo La Coruña	38	7	14	17	35	60	−25	35 (Note: Head-to-head record: Deportivo 7 pts, Granada 6 pts, Eibar 2 pts)	

Source: La Liga
Rules for classification: 1) points; 2) head-to-head points; 3) head-to-head goal difference; 4) goal difference; 5) number of goals scored; 6) fair-play points; 7) playoff match
(R) Relegated

==== Results summary ====
Overall								Home						Away					
Pld	W	D	L	GF	GA	GD	Pts	W	D	L	GF	GA	GD	W	D	L	GF	GA	GD
5	1	1	3	1	10	−9	4	0	0	2	0	7	−7	1	1	1	1	3	−2

Last updated: 25 September 2014.
Source: Levante UD

==== Matches ====
Kickoff times are in CET and CEST.

Round	Date	Time	Opponent	Location	Score	Scorer	Attendance	Referee
1	24 August 2014	23:00	Villarreal	Ciutat de València, Valencia	0–2		12,600	Fernández Borbalán (Andalusia)
2	30 August 2014	19:00	Atletico Bilbao	San Mamés, Bilbao	0–3		48,300	Pérez Montero (Andalusia)
3	13 September 2014	18:00	Málaga	La Rosaleda, Málaga	0–0		19,710	Gil Manzano (Extremadura)
4	21 September 2014	21:00	Barcelona	Ciutat de València, Valencia	0–5		22,177	González González (Castile and León)
5	24 September 2014	22:00	Granada	Nuevo Los Cármenes, Granada	1–0	Rubén García 46'	29,456	Álvarez Izquierdo (Catalan)
6	27 September 2014	22:00	Rayo Vallecano	Ciutat de València, Valencia
7	4 October 2014	20:00	Eibar	Ipurua, Eibar
8	18 October 2014	16:00	Real Madrid	Ciutat de València, Valencia
9	26 October 2014		Celta Vigo	Balaídos, Vigo
10	2 November 2014		Almería	Ciutat de València, Valencia
11	9 November 2014		Sevilla	Ramón Sánchez-Pizjuán, Sevilla
12	23 November 2014		Valencia	Ciutat de València, Valencia
13	30 November 2014		Espanyol	Power8 Stadium, Barcelona
14	7 December 2014		Getafe	Ciutat de València, Valencia
15	13 December 2014	20:00	Córdoba	Nuevo Arcángel, Córdoba	0–0		14,000	Prieto Iglesias
16	20 December 2014	18:00	Real Sociedad	Ciutat de València, Valencia	1–1	Ivanschitz 90+3'	16,800	Jaime Latre
17	3 January 2015	16:00	Atlético Madrid	Vicente Calderón, Madrid	1–3	El Zhar 62'	52,163	Álvarez Izquierdo (Catalan)
18	9 January 2015	20:45	Deportivo La Coruña	Ciutat de València, Valencia	0–0		17,000	Pérez Montero
19	18 January 2015	21:00	Elche	Martínez Valero, Elche	0–1		14,726	Velasco Carballo
20	25 January 2015	22:00	Villarreal	El Madrigal, Vila-real	0–1		11,000	David Fernández
21	1 February 2015	12:00	Athletic Bilbao	Ciutat de València, Valencia	0–2		16,359	Aleajndro Hernández
22	8 February 2015	22:00	Málaga	Ciutat de València, Valencia	4–1	Barral 26' 37' 62' Uche 75'	14,500	Carlos Del Cerro
23	15 February 2015	17:00	Barcelona	Camp Nou, Barcelona	0–5		74,963	Mario Melero
24	22 February 2015	20:45	Granada	Ciutat de València, Valencia	2–1	Víctor Camarasa 88'Barral 93'	14,000	Alfonso Álvarez
25	1 March 2015	18:00	Rayo Vallecano	Campo de Vallecas, Vallecas	2–4	Casadesús 13' Uche 85'	10,512	Iñaki Bikandi
26	8 March 2015		Eibar	Ciutat de València, Valencia
27	15 March 2015		Real Madrid	Santiago Bernabéu, Madrid
28	22 March 2015		Celta Vigo	Ciutat de València, Valencia
29	5 April 2015		Almería	Juegos Mediterráneos, Almería
30	8 April 2015		Sevilla	Ciutat de València, Valencia
31	12 April 2015		Valencia	Mestalla, Valencia
32	19 April 2015		Espanyol	Ciutat de València, Valencia
33	26 April 2015		Getafe	Coliseum Alfonso Pérez, Getafe
34	29 April 2015		Córdoba	Ciutat de València, Valencia
35	3 May 2015		Real Sociedad	Anoeta, San Sebastián
36	10 May 2015		Atlético Madrid	Ciutat de València, Valencia
37	17 May 2015		Deportivo La Coruña	Riazor, A Coruña
38	24 May 2015		Elche	Ciutat de València, Valencia

=== Copa del Rey ===
5 December 2014 Round of 32 1st leg	Albacete	1–1	Levante	Albacete
20:00	Moutinho 6'	Report	El Adoua 69'	Stadium: Carlos Belmonte; Attendance: 4,813; Referee: Xavier Estrada Fernández

17 December 2014 Round of 32 2nd leg	Levante	0–0 (1–1 agg.)	Albacete	Valencia
20:00		Report		Stadium: Ciutat de València; Attendance: 6,000; Referee: Ignacio Iglesias Villanueva

6 January 2015 Round of 16 1st leg	Málaga	2–0	Levante	Málaga
19:00	Juanpi 16'; Horta 78'	Report		Stadium: La Rosaleda; Attendance: 12,000; Referee: Alejandro Hernández Hernández

13 January 2015 Round of 16 2nd leg	Levante	3–2 (3–4 agg.)	Málaga	Valencia
22:00	Barral 71', 74'; Juanfran 85'	Report	Horta 22'; Recio 38'	Stadium: Ciutat de València; Attendance: 4,000; Referee: José Luis González González
