= 2015–16 Levante UD season =

Levante UD
2015–16 season
- President: Quico Catalán
- Head coach: Lucas Alcaraz
- Stadium: Ciutat de València
- La Liga: 20th (relegated)
- Copa del Rey: Round of 32
- Top goalscorer: League: Deyverson (9); All: Deyverson (9)
- Highest home attendance: 22,424
- Lowest home attendance: 9,225
- Average home league attendance: 13,645
Home colours	Away colours

The 2015–16 season was the 108th season in Levante UD’s history and the 11th in the top-tier.

== Current squad ==
As of 22 January 2016

Note: Flags indicate national team as defined under FIFA eligibility rules; some limited exceptions apply. Players may hold more than one non-FIFA nationality.

No.	Pos.	Nation	Player
1	GK	ESP	Jesús
2	DF	ESP	Iván López
3	DF	ESP	Toño
4	DF	ESP	David Navarro (vice-captain)
5	MF	MOZ	Simão Mate
6	MF	ESP	Víctor Camarasa
7	MF	ESP	Verza
8	MF	COL	Jefferson Lerma (on loan from Atlético Huila)
10	MF	ESP	Rubén García
11	MF	ESP	José Luis Morales
12	DF	ESP	Juanfran (captain)
13	GK	ESP	Rubén

No.	Pos.	Nation	Player
14	FW	ESP	Roger Martí
15	DF	GRE	Nikolaos Karabelas
16	DF	ESP	Ángel Trujillo
17	MF	ESP	Jordi Xumetra
18	FW	ESP	Víctor
19	DF	ESP	Pedro López
20	FW	BRA	Deyverson
21	FW	ITA	Giuseppe Rossi (on loan from Fiorentina)
22	MF	ESP	José Mari
23	FW	ALG	Nabil Ghilas (on loan from Porto)
24	DF	MAR	Zouhair Feddal
25	GK	ESP	Diego Mariño

=== Out on loan ===
Note: Flags indicate national team as defined under FIFA eligibility rules; some limited exceptions apply. Players may hold more than one non-FIFA nationality.

No.	Pos.	Nation	Player
—	MF	ESP	Jason (on loan at Albacete)
—	FW	BRA	Rafael Martins (on loan at Moreirense)

== Competitions ==
=== Overall ===
Competition	Started round	Final position / round	First match	Last match
La Liga	Matchday 1		23 August 2015	15 May 2016
Copa del Rey	Round of 32	Round of 32	3 December 2015	15 December 2015

Updated to match played 8 May 2016
Source: Competitions

=== Overview ===
Competition	Record							
Competition	Pld	W	D	L	GF	GA	GD	Win %
La Liga	38	8	8	22	37	70	−33	21.05
Copa del Rey	2	0	1	1	2	3	−1	0.00
Total	40	8	9	23	39	73	−34	20.00

Last updated: 15 May 2016
Source: Competitions

=== La Liga ===
==== League table ====
Pos	Team	Pld	W	D	L	GF	GA	GD	Pts	Qualification or relegation
16	Granada	38	10	9	19	46	69	−23	39 (Note: Granada finished ahead of Sporting Gijón on head-to-head record; Granada 2–0 Sporting Gijón, Sporting Gijón 3–3 Granada.)	
17	Sporting Gijón	38	10	9	19	40	62	−22	39	
18	Rayo Vallecano (R)	38	9	11	18	52	73	−21	38	Relegation to Segunda División
19	Getafe (R)	38	9	9	20	37	67	−30	36	Relegation to Segunda División
20	Levante (R)	38	8	8	22	37	70	−33	32	Relegation to Segunda División

Source: La Liga, Soccerway
Rules for classification: 1) Points; 2) Head-to-head points; 3) Head-to-head goal difference; 4) Goal difference; 5) Goals scored; 6) Fair-play points; 7) Play-off.
(R) Relegated

==== Results summary ====
Overall								Home						Away					
Pld	W	D	L	GF	GA	GD	Pts	W	D	L	GF	GA	GD	W	D	L	GF	GA	GD
38	8	8	22	37	70	−33	32	7	5	7	23	26	−3	1	3	15	14	44	−30

Last updated: 15 May 2016.

==== Result round by round ====
Round	1	2	3	4	5	6	7	8	9	10	11	12	13	14	15	16	17	18	19	20	21	22	23	24	25	26	27	28	29	30	31	32	33	34	35	36	37	38
Ground	H	A	H	A	H	A	H	A	H	A	H	A	H	A	H	A	H	A	H	A	H	A	H	A	H	A	H	A	H	A	H	A	H	A	H	A	H	A
Result	L	D	D	L	D	L	W	L	L	L	D	W	L	D	L	L	L	L	W	L	W	L	L	L	W	L	L	D	W	L	D	L	W	L	D	L	W	L
Position	16	13	14	19	16	19	18	18	20	20	20	19	20	19	20	20	20	20	20	20	20	20	20	20	20	20	20	20	20	20	20	20	20	20	20	20	20	20

Updated to match(es) played on 8 May 2016. Source:
A = Away; H = Home; W = Win; D = Draw; L = Loss

==== Matches ====
Win Draw Loss

23 August 2015 1	Levante	1–2	Celta Vigo	Valencia
22:00 (UTC+2)	Simão Mate (red card) 5'; Verza 55'; Morales (yellow card) 90+5'	Report	Orellana 41'; Johnny (yellow card) 42'; Aspas 77'; Guidetti (yellow card) 81'	Stadium: Ciutat de València; Attendance: 10,346; Referee: Ricardo de Burgos Bengoetxea

28 August 2015 2	Las Palmas	0–0	Levante	Las Palmas
22:30 (UTC+2)	Culio (yellow card) 65'; Mesa (yellow card) 86'	Report	Deyverson (yellow card) 50'; Rubén (yellow card) 61'; Juanfran (yellow card) 68'; I. López (yellow card) 82'	Stadium: Gran Canaria; Attendance: 18,832; Referee: Pedro Pérez Montero

11 September 2015 3	Levante	1–1	Sevilla	Valencia
20:30 (UTC+2)	Kakuta (yellow card) 5'; Nzonzi 12'; Konoplyanka (yellow card) 38'; Trémoulinas (yellow card) 64'	Report	Camarasa 58'; Juanfran (yellow card) 81'; Ghilas (yellow card) 82'	Stadium: Ciutat de València; Attendance: 16,191; Referee: Ignacio Iglesias Villanueva

20 September 2015 4	Barcelona	4–1	Levante	Barcelona
20:30 CEST (UTC+02:00)	Bartra 50'; Neymar 56'; Messi 61' (pen.), 90'	Report	Verza (yellow card) 45'; Víctor 66'	Stadium: Camp Nou; Attendance: 76,013; Referee: David Fernández Borbalán

23 September 2015 5	Levante	2–2	Eibar	Valencia
20:00 (UTC+2)	Morales 52'; José Mari (yellow card) 83'; Deyverson (yellow card) 90+1', (goal) 90+3'	Report	Borja 10', 48', (yellow card) 37'; Juncà (yellow card) 36'; Escalante (yellow card) 54'; Capa (yellow card) 60'; Ekiza (yellow card) 82'	Stadium: Ciutat de València; Attendance: 10,929; Referee: Carlos Velasco Carballo

27 September 2015 6	Getafe	3–0	Levante	Getafe
18:15 (UTC+2)	Medrán (yellow card) 3'; Noblejas (yellow card) 7'; Vázquez 81', 90+2'; Emi 90+1'	Report	Camarasa (yellow card) 21'; Feddal (yellow card) 46'; Toño (yellow card) 73'	Stadium: Coliseum Alfonso Pérez; Attendance: 5,934; Referee: Santiago Jaime Latre

4 October 2015 7	Levante	1–0	Villarreal	Valencia
18:15 (UTC+2)	Juanfran (yellow card) 19'; Morales (yellow card) 50'; Deyverson 83'; José Mari (yellow card) 84'; Rubén (yellow card) 90+2'	Report	Jokić (yellow card) 4' (yellow-red card) 36'; Costa (yellow card) 60'; Soldado (yellow card) 84'; Ruiz (yellow card) 87'	Stadium: Ciutat de València; Attendance: 16,059; Referee: Alfonso Álvarez Izquierdo

17 October 2015 8	Real Madrid	3–0	Levante	Madrid
16:00 (UTC+2)	Marcelo 27'; Ronaldo 30'; Kovačić (yellow card) 45'; Jesé 81'	Report	Feddal (yellow card) 13'; Morales (yellow card) 38'; Deyverson (yellow card) 48'; José Mari (yellow card) 58'	Stadium: Santiago Bernabéu; Attendance: 63,476; Referee: José María Sánchez Martínez

25 October 2015 9	Levante	0–4	Real Sociedad	Valencia
12:00 (UTC+2)	Deyverson (yellow card) 21' (yellow-red card) 90'; Feddal (yellow card) 48'; Lerma (yellow card) 55'; Roger (yellow card) 90+2'	Report	Vela 8', 84'; González (yellow card) 13'; Bergara (yellow card) 14'; Agirretxe 35'; Illarramendi 82'; Berchiche (yellow card) 90+2'	Stadium: Ciutat de València; Attendance: 14,228; Referee: Alberto Undiano Mallenco

31 October 2015 10	Valencia	3–0	Levante	Valencia
18:15 (UTC+2)	Pérez (yellow card) 28'; Alcácer 64' (pen.); Gomes (yellow card) 66'; Feghouli 72'; Bakkali 80'	Report	García (yellow card) 36'; Rubén (yellow card) 62'	Stadium: Mestalla; Attendance: 39,147; Referee: Ricardo de Burgos Bengoetxea

7 November 2015 11	Levante	1–1	Deportivo La Coruña	Valencia
18:15 (UTC+1)	Camarasa 53'; Toño (yellow card) 62'; Simão Mate (yellow card) 82'; Víctor (yellow card) 84'; García (yellow card) 90+2'	Report	Lucas 22'; Borges (yellow card) 52'; Navarro (yellow card) 76'	Stadium: Ciutat de València; Attendance: 13,695; Referee: Carlos del Cerro Grande

22 November 2015 12	Sporting Gijón	0–3	Levante	Gijón
12:00 (UTC+1)	Halilović (yellow card) 45'; Canella (yellow card) 64'; López (yellow card) 73'; Cases (yellow card) 90+1'	Report	Deyverson 18', 44'; Feddal 27'; García (yellow card) 51'; Rubén (yellow card) 60'; Toño (yellow card) 61'; P. López (yellow card) 83'; Simão Mate (yellow card) 90+2'	Stadium: El Molinón; Attendance: 19,536; Referee: Mario Melero López

27 November 2015 13	Levante	0–1	Real Betis	Valencia
20:30 (UTC+1)	Deyverson (yellow card) 14'; Verza (yellow card) 44'; Feddal (yellow card) 66'; Roger (yellow card) 71'; P. López (yellow card) 78'; Juanfran (red card) 81'	Report	Castro 4'; Cejudo (yellow card) 14'; N'Diaye (yellow card) 37'; Westermann (yellow card) 48' (yellow-red card) 79'; Varela (yellow card) 80'; Adán (yellow card) 90+3'	Stadium: Ciutat de València; Attendance: 13,957; Referee: José María Sánchez Martínez

7 December 2015 14	Espanyol	1–1	Levante	Cornellà de Llobregat
20:30 (UTC+1)	Diop (yellow card) 42'; Roco (yellow card) 49'; Gerard 56', (yellow card) 87'; Caicedo (yellow card) 60'	Report	Lerma 6', (yellow card) 15'; P. López (yellow card) 75'; Víctor (yellow card) 82'; Toño (yellow card) 86'; Xumetra (yellow card) 88'	Stadium: Cornellà-El Prat; Attendance: 14,875; Referee: Carlos Velasco Carballo

12 December 2015 15	Levante	1–2	Granada	Valencia
18:15 (UTC+1)	Simão Mate (yellow card) 59', (goal) 66'; Verza (yellow card) 72'	Report	Peñaranda 50', 88'; Rico (yellow card) 65'; Fernández (yellow card) 78'	Stadium: Ciutat de València; Attendance: 12,284; Referee: Iñaki Vicandi Garrido

20 December 2015 16	Athletic Bilbao	2–0	Levante	Bilbao
18:15 (UTC+1)	San José 55'; Williams 82'	Report	Toño (yellow card) 37'; Simão Mate (yellow card) 39'; Feddal (yellow card) 63'; P. López (yellow card) 74'; Lerma (yellow card) 90+1'	Stadium: San Mamés; Attendance: 39,380; Referee: Alejandro Hernández Hernández

30 December 2015 17	Levante	0–1	Málaga	Valencia
16:00 (UTC+1)	Simão Mate (yellow card) 21'; Roger (yellow card) 35'; Lerma (yellow card) 72'; Navarro (yellow card) 77'; P. López (yellow card) 87'; Deyverson (yellow card) 88'; Karabelas (yellow card) 90+2'	Report	Juan Carlos (yellow card) 1'; Camacho (yellow card) 44'; Duda 78', (yellow card) 84'; Amrabat (yellow card) 88'; Juanpi (yellow card) 89'	Stadium: Ciutat de València; Attendance: 12,094; Referee: Jesús Gil Manzano

2 January 2016 18	Atlético Madrid	1–0	Levante	Madrid
20:30 (UTC+1)	Thomas 81'	Report	García (yellow card) 61'; Xumetra (yellow card) 61'; Feddal (yellow card) 90+3'; Verza (yellow card) 90+4'	Stadium: Vicente Calderón; Attendance: 43,417; Referee: Carlos Clos Gómez

9 January 2016 19	Levante	2–1	Rayo Vallecano	Valencia
22:05 (UTC+1)	Feddal (yellow card) 34'; Simão Mate (yellow card) 37'; Deyverson (yellow card) 72', (goal) 72'; Morales 81'; Verza (yellow card) 85'; Xumetra (yellow card) 90+3'	Report	Hernández 83'; Guerra (yellow card) 89'	Stadium: Ciutat de València; Attendance: 10,589; Referee: Mario Melero López

16 January 2016 20	Celta Vigo	4–3	Levante	Vigo
18:15 CET (UTC+01:00)	Bongonda (yellow card) 32'; Guidetti 35', 40'; Aspas 57'; Orellana 84'	Report	Toño (yellow card) 31'; Simão Mate (yellow card) 40'; Deyverson 63'; P. López 65'; Camarasa (yellow card) 67'; Lerma (yellow card) 68'; Morales 89'	Stadium: Balaídos; Attendance: 17,080; Referee: Carlos del Cerro Grande

25 January 2016 21	Levante	3–2	Las Palmas	Valencia
20:30 (UTC+1)	Morales 25', 63'; Toño (yellow card) 43'; Deyverson 47', (yellow card) 57' (yellow-red card) 90+3'; Xumetra (yellow card) 74'	Report	Mesa (yellow card) 24'; Willian José 49', 66'; Varas (yellow card) 57'; Aythami (yellow card) 62'; Wakaso (yellow card) 89'	Stadium: Ciutat de València; Attendance: 13,155; Referee: Carlos Velasco Carballo

31 January 2016 22	Sevilla	3–1	Levante	Seville
12:00 (UTC+1)	Gameiro 1'; Iborra 47'; Cristóforo (yellow card) 73'; Konoplyanka 76'	Report	Toño (yellow card) 22'; Rossi 55'	Stadium: Ramón Sánchez Pizjuán; Attendance: 33,487; Referee: Alfonso Álvarez Izquierdo

7 February 2016 23	Levante	0–2	Barcelona	Valencia
12:00 (UTC+1)	Feddal (yellow card) 23'; Navarro (yellow card) 57'; Lerma (yellow card) 66'; I. López (yellow card) 83'	Report	Navarro 21' (o.g.); Piqué (yellow card) 28'; Alves (yellow card) 63'; Busquets (yellow card) 89'; Suárez 90+2'	Stadium: Ciutat de València; Attendance: 22,638; Referee: Pedro Pérez Montero

14 February 2016 24	Eibar	2–0	Levante	Eibar
18:15 (UTC+1)	García (yellow card) 35'; Borja 37'; Lillo (yellow card) 42'; Adrián 58'; Jota (yellow card) 90+1'	Report	Orbán (yellow card) 40'; Xumetra (yellow card) 41'	Stadium: Ipurua; Attendance: 4,766; Referee: Xavier Estrada Fernández

21 February 2016 25	Levante	3–0	Getafe	Valencia
20:30 (UTC+1)	Morales 10'; Rossi 43' (pen.); Deyverson (yellow card) 45+1'; Verza (yellow card) 68'; Verdú 81'	Report	Vergini (yellow card) 42'; Guaita (yellow card) 45+1'	Stadium: Ciutat de València; Attendance: 13,665; Referee: José González González

28 February 2016 26	Villarreal	3–0	Levante	Vilarreal
12:00 (UTC+1)	Baptistão 12'; Castillejo 30'; Adrián 48'	Report	Navarro (yellow card) 27' (yellow-red card) 56'; Lerma (yellow card) 39'; Verza (yellow card) 44'	Stadium: El Madrigal; Attendance: 15,783; Referee: Alejandro Hernández Hernández

2 March 2016 27	Levante	1–3	Real Madrid	Valencia
21:00 CET (UTC+01:00)	Deyverson 39'	Report	Ronaldo 34' (pen.); Mariño 38' (o.g.); Isco 90+2'	Stadium: Ciutat de València; Attendance: 19,725; Referee: Ricardo de Burgos Bengoetxea

6 March 2016 28	Real Sociedad	1–1	Levante	San Sebastián
18:15 CET (UTC+01:00)	Reyes 14'; Prieto (yellow card) 45'; Elustondo (yellow card) 52'; Granero (yellow card) 83'	Report	Feddal (yellow card) 19'; Deyverson 24'; I. López (yellow card) 35'; Verza (yellow card) 67'	Stadium: Anoeta; Attendance: 18,603; Referee: Pedro Pérez Montero

13 March 2016 29	Levante	1–0	Valencia	Valencia
12:00 CET (UTC+01:00)	Simão Mate (yellow card) 61'; Rossi 65'; P. López (yellow card) 90+2'	Report	Parejo (yellow card) 14'; Abdennour (yellow card) 49'; Fuego (yellow card) 77'; Mustafi (yellow card) 84'	Stadium: Ciutat de València; Attendance: 18,191; Referee: Carlos del Cerro Grande

19 March 2016 30	Deportivo	2–1	Levante	A Coruña
20:30 CET (UTC+01:00)	Luis Alberto 43', (yellow card) 90'; Mariño 85' (o.g.); Riera (yellow card) 88'	Report	Lerma (yellow card) 33'; Rossi 50'; Simão Mate (yellow card) 69'; Verza (yellow card) 90'	Stadium: Riazor; Attendance: 24,920; Referee: Iñaki Vicandi Garrido

3 April 2016 31	Levante	0–0	Sporting Gijón	Valencia
20:30 CET (UTC+01:00)	Feddal (yellow card) 30' (yellow-red card) 90+4'; Medjani (yellow card) 42'; Verza (yellow card) 61'; Camarasa (yellow card) 73'; Lerma (yellow card) 84'	Report	Hernández (yellow card) 34'; Lora (yellow card) 47'; Cuéllar (yellow card) 78'; Ndi (yellow card) 80'	Stadium: Ciutat de València; Attendance: 9,225; Referee: Mario Melero López

10 April 2016 32	Real Betis	1–0	Levante	Seville
22:05 CET (UTC+01:00)	N'Diaye (yellow card) 35'; Musonda (yellow card) 70'; Bruno (yellow card) 80'; Castro 81'; Cejudo (yellow card) 90+2'	Report	P. López (yellow card) 82'; Juanfran (yellow card) 89'; José Mari (yellow card) 90+4'	Stadium: Benito Villamarín; Attendance: 37,091; Referee: Eduardo Prieto Iglesias

17 April 2016 33	Levante	2–1	Espanyol	Valencia
20:30 CET (UTC+01:00)	Deyverson (yellow card) 13'; Rossi 23'; Lerma (yellow card) 39'; Medjani 66'; Juanfran (yellow card) 72'; Verza (yellow card) 78'; Cuero (yellow card) 83'	Report	Pérez 7'	Stadium: Ciutat de València; Attendance: 16,192; Referee: Alejandro Hernández Hernández

20 April 2016 34	Granada	5–1	Levante	Granada
20:45 CET (UTC+01:00)	Success 25'; El-Arabi 35' (pen.), 85' (pen.), 90', (yellow card) 86'; Rochina 44', (yellow card) 57'; Doucouré (yellow card) 58'; Biraghi (yellow card) 63'; Pérez (yellow card) 64'; Costa (yellow card) 89'	Report	Rossi (yellow card) 15'; Verza (yellow card) 34'; Deyverson (yellow card) 42'; Camarasa (yellow card) 84'; Mariño (yellow card) 85'; Simão Mate (yellow card) 85' (yellow-red card) 90'	Stadium: Los Cármenes; Attendance: 19,843; Referee: Santiago Jaime Latre

24 April 2016 35	Levante	2–2	Athletic Bilbao	Valencia
12:00 CEST (UTC+02:00)	Víctor 13'; Lerma (yellow card) 36'; Etxeita 68' (o.g.); Juanfran (yellow card) 74'	Report	Balenziaga (yellow card) 71'; Susaeta 88'; San José 90+1'	Stadium: Ciutat de València; Attendance: 14,409; Referee: Ignacio Iglesias Villanueva

1 May 2016 36	Málaga	3–1	Levante	Málaga
20:30 CEST (UTC+02:00)	Čop 30', 89'; Albentosa (yellow card) 66'; Camacho (yellow card) 77'; Castro 90+3'	Report	Morales 42'; Víctor (yellow card) 62'; P. López (yellow card) 76'; José Mari (yellow card) 77'; Juanfran (yellow card) 82'	Stadium: La Rosaleda; Attendance: 17,654; Referee: Iñaki Vicandi Garrido

8 May 2016 37	Levante	2–1	Atlético Madrid	Valencia
18:00 CEST	Víctor 30'; Juanfran (yellow card) 42'; Rossi 90'	Report	Torres 2'; Giménez (yellow card) 65'	Stadium: Ciutat de València; Attendance: 12,054; Referee: José González González

15 May 2016 38	Rayo Vallecano	3–1	Levante	Madrid
19:00 CEST (UTC+02:00)	Hernández 12'; Trashorras 20'; Amaya (yellow card) 59'; Miku 73'	Report	Verza 60' (pen.), (yellow card) 90'; Navarro (yellow card) 63'; Deyverson (yellow card) 82'	Stadium: Campo de Vallecas; Attendance: 12,547; Referee: Carlos Clos Gómez
