= 2016–17 Levante UD season =

Levante UD
2016–17 season
- President: Quico Catalán
- Head coach: Juan Muñiz
- Stadium: Ciutat de València
- Segunda División: 1st (promoted)
- Copa del Rey: Second round
- Top goalscorer: League: Roger (22); All: Roger (22)
Home colours	Away colours	Third colours

The 2016–17 season is the 97th season in Levante UD ’s history and the 43rd in the second-tier.

== Squad ==
As of 1 February 2017

Note: Flags indicate national team as defined under FIFA eligibility rules; some limited exceptions apply. Players may hold more than one non-FIFA nationality.

No.	Pos.	Nation	Player
1	GK	ESP	Raúl Fernández
2	DF	ESP	Iván López
3	DF	ESP	Toño García
4	DF	ESP	Róber (on loan from Deportivo La Coruña)
6	MF	ESP	Javier Espinosa
7	MF	ESP	Verza (2nd captain)
8	MF	COL	Jefferson Lerma
9	FW	ESP	Roger Martí
10	MF	ESP	Rubén García (3rd captain)
11	MF	ESP	José Luis Morales (4th captain)
12	DF	MNE	Esteban Saveljich

No.	Pos.	Nation	Player
13	GK	ESP	Oier Olazábal (on loan from Granada)
14	FW	ESP	Juan Muñoz (on loan from Sevilla)
15	DF	ESP	Sergio Postigo
16	DF	ESP	Chema Rodríguez
18	FW	ESP	Víctor Casadesús
19	DF	ESP	Pedro López (Captain)
20	MF	ESP	Paco Montañés (on loan from Espanyol)
21	MF	ESP	Natxo Insa
22	DF	ESP	Abraham (on loan from Zaragoza)
23	MF	ESP	Jason
24	MF	ESP	José Campaña

== Competitions ==
=== Overall ===
Competition	Final position
Segunda División	1st
Copa del Rey	Second round

=== Liga ===
==== League table ====
Pos	Team	Pld	W	D	L	GF	GA	GD	Pts	Promotion, qualification or relegation
1	Levante (C, P)	42	25	9	8	57	32	+25	84	Promotion to La Liga
2	Girona (P)	42	20	10	12	65	45	+20	70	Promotion to La Liga
3	Getafe (O, P)	42	18	14	10	55	43	+12	68	Qualification to promotion play-offs
4	Tenerife	42	16	18	8	50	37	+13	66	Qualification to promotion play-offs
5	Cádiz	42	16	16	10	55	40	+15	64	Qualification to promotion play-offs

Source: La Liga
Rules for classification: 1) points; 2) head-to-head points; 3) head-to-head goal difference; 4) goal difference; 5) number of goals scored
(C) Champions; (O) Play-off winners; (P) Promoted

==== Matches ====
Kickoff times are in CET. Win Draw Loss

Match	Opponent	Venue	Result
1	Numancia	A	0–1
2	Alcorcón	H	2–0
3	G. Tarragona	A	1–1
4	Zaragoza	H	4–2
5	Córdoba	A	1–0
6	Sevilla At.	H	1–0
7	Elche	A	0–1
8	Valladolid	H	3–2
9	Almería	A	2–2
10	Mallorca	H	2–1
11	Mirandés	A	0–3
12	Getafe	H	1–1
13	Reus	A	0–1
14	Cádiz	H	0–0
15	Oviedo	A	2–0
17	Girona	A	2–1
18	Tenerife	H	1–0
16	Rayo	H	1–0
20	Lugo	H	1–0
19	UCAM	A	0–2
21	Huesca	A	0–2

Match	Opponent	Venue	Result
22	Numancia	H	1–0
23	Alcorcón	A	2–0
24	G. Tarragona	H	2–1
25	Zaragoza	A	0–1
26	Córdoba	H	3–1
27	Sevilla At.	A	1–1
28	Elche	H	2–1
29	Valladolid	A	0–4
30	Almería	H	1–0
31	Mallorca	A	1–1
32	Mirandés	H	2–1
33	Getafe	A	2–0
34	Reus	H	0–0
35	Cádiz	A	1–1
36	Oviedo	H	1–0
37	Rayo	A	2–1
38	Girona	H	2–1
39	Tenerife	A	0–0
40	UCAM	H	3–1
41	Lugo	A	1–0
42	Huesca	H	1–2

=== Copa del Rey ===
7 September 2016 Second round	Cádiz	1–1 (a.e.t.) (3–2 p)	Levante	Cádiz
20:00	Güiza 42'	Report	Roger 71'	Stadium: Ramón de Carranza; Attendance: 12,389; Referee: Alberola Rojas
	Penalties
	Cruz (penalty missed); García (penalty scored); Santamaría (penalty scored); Oliván (penalty scored)		(penalty scored) Espinosa; (penalty missed) Verza; (penalty missed) Montañés; (penalty scored) Roger; (penalty missed) Campaña
