= 2013–14 Levante UD season =

Levante UD
2013–14 season
- President: Quico Catalán
- Head coach: Joaquín Caparrós
- Stadium: Ciutat de València
- Primera División: 10th
- Copa del Rey: Quarter-finals
Home colours

The 2013–14 season was the 105th season in Levante’s history and the 9th in the top-tier.

== Squad ==
As June, 2014..

=== Squad and statistics ===
No.	Pos	Nat	Player	Total		Liga		Copa	
No.	Pos	Nat	Player	Apps	Goals	Apps	Goals	Apps	Goals
1	GK	(Costa Rica) CRC	Keylor Navas	39	0	37	0	2	0
2	MF	(France) FRA	Rémi Gomis	1	0	0	0	1	0
3	FW	(Spain) ESP	Víctor Casadesús	14	1	14	1	0	0
3	FW	(Cameroon) CMR	Aloys Nong	12	0	6	0	6	0
69	DF	(Cameroon) CMR	Bruno Casimir	2	2	1	1	1	1
4	DF	(Spain) ESP	David Navarro	30	1	29	1	1	0
5	DF	(Spain) ESP	Héctor Rodas	17	0	16	0	1	0
6	DF	(Greece) GRE	Loukas Vyntra	38	2	33	2	5	0
7	FW	(Spain) ESP	David Barral	36	8	32	7	4	1
8	FW	(Morocco) MAR	Nabil El Zhar	28	5	24	4	4	1
9	FW	(Spain) ESP	Ángel Rodríguez	15	2	10	2	5	0
10	FW	(Senegal) SEN	Baba Diawara	20	3	20	3	0	0
11	MF	(Spain) ESP	Rubén García	34	3	32	2	2	1
12	DF	(Spain) ESP	Juanfran	39	0	35	0	4	0
13	GK	(Spain) ESP	Javi Jiménez	6	0	2	0	4	0
14	MF	(Spain) ESP	Miguel Pallardó	4	0	3	0	1	0
15	DF	(Greece) GRE	Nikolaos Karabelas	21	0	16	0	5	0
16	MF	(Morocco) MAR	Issam El Adoua	23	0	18	0	5	0
17	MF	(Spain) ESP	Jordi Xumetra	29	1	25	1	4	0
18	MF	(Portugal) POR	Sérgio Pinto	23	0	18	0	5	0
19	DF	(Spain) ESP	Pedro López	34	1	32	1	2	0
20	MF	(Spain) ESP	Pedro Ríos	18	1	13	1	5	0
21	MF	(Austria) AUT	Andreas Ivanschitz	31	4	29	3	2	1
22	MF	(Mali) MLI	Mohamed Sissoko	10	0	10	0	0	0
22	MF	(Germany) GER	Christian Lell	5	0	5	0	0	0
23	MF	(Senegal) SEN	Pape Diop	36	4	34	4	2	0
24	MF	(Mozambique) MOZ	Simão Mate Junior	33	2	31	1	2	1
25	DF	(Spain) ESP	Nagore	8	0	4	0	4	0
26	FW	(Spain) ESP	David Remeseiro	1	0	1	0	0	0
33	DF	(Spain) ESP	Jordi López	2	0	0	0	2	0
37	MF	(Spain) ESP	Víctor Camarasa	9	1	3	0	6	1

== Competitions ==
=== Overall ===
Competition	Started round	Final position / round	First match	Last match
La Liga	—	10th	18 August 2013	16 May 2014
Copa del Rey	Round of 32	Quarter-finals	7 December 2013	29 January 2014

Updated to match played June 2014
Source: Competitions

=== Primera División ===
==== League table ====
Pos	Team	Pld	W	D	L	GF	GA	GD	Pts
8	Valencia	38	13	10	15	51	53	−2	49
9	Celta Vigo	38	14	7	17	49	54	−5	49
10	Levante	38	12	12	14	35	43	−8	48
11	Málaga	38	12	9	17	39	46	−7	45
12	Rayo Vallecano	38	13	4	21	46	80	−34	43

Source: La Liga, ESPN
Rules for classification: 1st points; 2nd head-to-head points;
