= Jefferson Lerma =

Colombian footballer (born 1994)

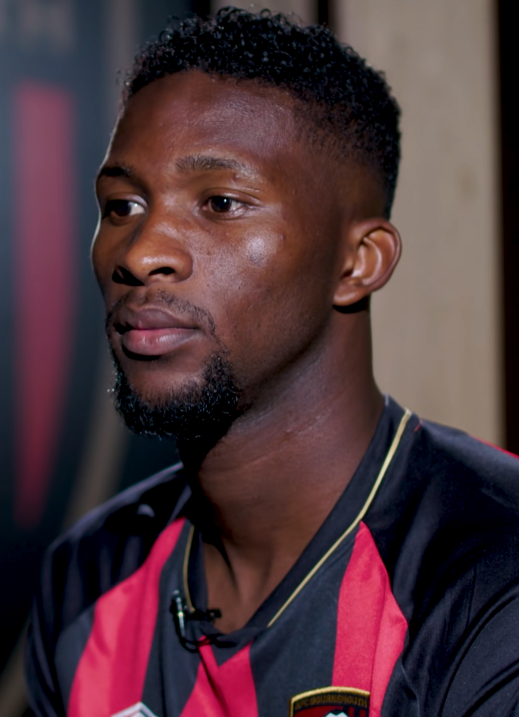
- Lerma with AFC Bournemouth in 2018

Personal information
- Full name: Jefferson Andrés Lerma Solís
- Date of birth: 25 October 1994 (age 32)
- Place of birth: El Cerrito, Valle del Cauca, Colombia
- Height: 1.79 m (5 ft 10 in)
- Positions: Central midfielder; centre-back

Team information
- Current team: Crystal Palace
- Number: 8

Youth career
- Atlético Huila

Senior career*
Years	Team	Apps	(Gls)
2013–2016	Atlético Huila	84	(6)
2015–2016	→ Levante (loan)	33	(1)
2016–2018	Levante	56	(2)
2018–2023	AFC Bournemouth	176	(12)
2023–	Crystal Palace	97	(2)

International career^{‡}
2016	Colombia Olympic	3	(0)
2017–	Colombia	70	(5)
Medal record
Men's football
Representing Colombia
Copa América
Runner-up	2024 United States
- * Club domestic league appearances and goals as of 19:30, 31 October 2026 (UTC) ‡ National team caps and goals as of 7 July 2026 (UTC)

Jefferson Andrés Lerma Solís (born 25 October 1994) is a Colombian professional footballer who plays as a central midfielder or centre-back for Premier League club Crystal Palace and the Colombia national team.

A youth product of Atlético Huila, Lerma played for three years in Colombia before joining Spanish side Levante on loan in 2016, with the club making the move permanent later that year on a four-year contract. In 2018, he signed for Premier League side AFC Bournemouth for a club-record fee of €30 million, spending five seasons there before joining Crystal Palace on a free transfer in 2023, where he went on to win the FA Cup and the FA Community Shield in 2025, as well as the UEFA Conference League in 2026.

Lerma first played with Colombia's Olympic team, representing them at the 2016 Summer Olympics in Rio, and made his senior international debut the following year. He was part of the Colombia squads that participated at the FIFA World Cup in 2018 and 2026, also representing his nation at the 2019 and 2024 editions of the Copa América, helping his country finish as runners-up in the latter.

== Club career ==
=== Atlético Huila ===
==== 2013 Apertura and Clausura ====
Born in El Cerrito, Valle del Cauca, Lerma relocated to Neiva, Huila and graduated with Atlético Huila's youth setup. After being promoted to the main squad in January 2013, he made his professional debut on 30 March, starting in a 0–0 home draw against Millonarios. On 17 April, Lerma provided the assist for Huila's third goal against Independiente Medellín which allowed his team to win 3–2. On the final match day, Lerma made his second direct contribution of the season, distributing an assist in a 1–1 home draw against Santa Fe. Lerma appeared in 20 matches during his first professional season, as his side finished 13th in the Apertura.

For the 2013 Clausura, Lerma's side avoided a relegation play-off, finishing in 14th place with two points more than Cúcuta Deportivo who were relegated after losing their play-off series against second division side Fortaleza.

==== 2014 Apertura and Clausura ====
Lerma scored his first professional goals on 6 February 2014, scoring a brace in a 3–1 home success over newly promoted Fortaleza, the first of which was the club's 1,000th. Lerma netted his third goal of the season on 10 April in a 2–0 home win over Once Caldas. Although Lerma's goal secured an important victory, Huila failed to qualify for the Apertura's final phase after they lost away at Santa Fe and tied at home with Uniautónoma in their remaining matches, thus resulting in a 12th-place finish.

Lerma suffered the first red card of his career on 2 August 2014, after receiving a second booking in the 45th minute during a Clausura match against Fortaleza. On 20 October, Lerma scored a vital goal in a 3–0 win against Deportivo Pasto. Huila ultimately qualified to the 2014 Clausura's final phase, and eventually fell short from disputing the final despite having the same amount of points as group counter-part Santa Fe, who would go on to dispute and win the final against Independiente Medellín.

==== 2015 Apertura ====
Lerma would maintain his consistency during the 2015 Apertura, guiding Huila to a surprising first-place finish in the league table, thus qualifying for the Apertura's quarter-finals against Deportes Tolima. However, Huila was knocked-out by Tolima with Lerma missing out on both games due to injury. Overall, that season Lerma would establish himself as key integrant for Atlético Huila, which attracted the interest of European clubs such as Spanish side Levante. Despite rumours of a potential loan to Spain, Lerma was included in Huila's squad for the initial part of 2015 Clausura. On 8 August, he scored a goal during his last game for Huila from free-kick in a 2–1 away defeat to Deportes Tolima.

=== Levante ===
==== 2015–16 season: Relegation ====
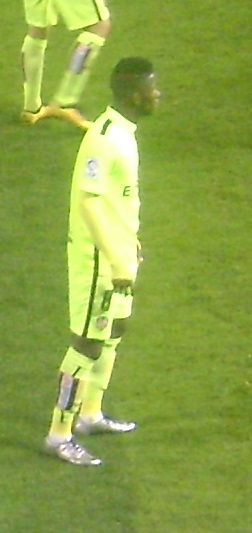
Lerma with Levante in 2016

While disputing the 2016 Summer Olympics with Colombia on 13 August, Lerma agreed to a one-year loan contract with La Liga club Levante. He made his debut later that month, replacing Nabil Ghilas in a 0–0 away draw to Las Palmas. Lerma incorporated himself quickly to Levante's team dynamics, and scored his first goal in the main category of Spanish football on 7 December 2015, scoring the match's first goal in a 1–1 away draw with Espanyol.

He provided an assist to Deyverson on 25 February 2016, which helped Levante win their home duel against Las Palmas 3–2. After appearing in 25 matches for the club, he signed a four-year contract effective 1 July 2016 for a €600,000 transfer fee. He provided a further assist during his debut season for Levante in a match against Athletic Bilbao on 24 April, which ended 2–2. On 2 May, Lerma and his team suffered relegation to the second division after a defeat to Málaga CF which left Levante with no mathematical possibility of avoiding relegation. Overall, Lerma finished the season with 34 appearances, one goal, and two assists across all competitions.

==== 2016–17 season: Promotion to La Liga ====
Lerma made his Segunda División debut on 4 September 2016, coming off the bench in a 1–1 away draw against Gimnàstic. On 2 October, he received a double-booking during Levante's 3–2 victory over Real Valladolid. On 15 October, Lerma guided Levante to an important victory against Mallorca, where he scored Levante's second goal in a 2–1 triumph. He provided the assist for Roger Martí's ninth goal of the season during Levante's 0–3 away victory against CD Mirandés. On 11 January 2017, Lerma scored his first goal of the year, Levante's second in a 0–2 away win against UCAM Murcia CF. In early April, a torn muscle injury would rule Lerma out for six league games. On 13 May, he made his return as a starter during Levante's 2–1 home win over Girona. After a well-fought season, Levante finished first and were crowned as the champions for the 2016–17 Segunda División season, thus achieving direct promotion to La Liga.

==== 2017–18 season ====
On 21 August 2017, Lerma made his return to the top-flight of Spanish football at home against Villarreal CF, where he played the entire match as his team secured a 1–0 victory. Throughout the first half of the season, a muscle injury would ultimately prevent Lerma from disputing nine league matches. On 26 February 2018, Lerma made his return upon recovery against Real Betis. On 31 March, Lerma provided an assist for José Luis Morales' decisive equalizing goal against Girona away from home. On 13 May, Lerma took part in Levante's historic win against FC Barcelona, which ended 5–4 at Levante's Estadi Ciutat de València. Lerma's team eventually finished 15th at the end of the season, thus maintaining a spot in Spain's top flight.

=== AFC Bournemouth ===
==== 2018–19 season ====
On 7 August 2018, Lerma joined Premier League club AFC Bournemouth for a club record transfer fee of €30 million. On 1 September, he made his debut for Bournemouth playing 88 minutes in a 2–0 loss against Chelsea. On 1 October during a league match against Crystal Palace, Lerma was fouled in the penalty area which resulted in a penalty being award to Bournemouth. Junior Stanislas successfully converted the decisive penalty which helped Bournemouth win the match 2–1. Lerma scored his first goal for the club in a 2–1 defeat against Newcastle United on 10 November 2018. He scored on the final day of his first season at the club in a 5–3 defeat away to Crystal Palace. Lerma established himself as a fan favourite player, due to his tough-tackling, no-nonsense style of play, as well as an important part of the Bournemouth team during his first season in the Premier League; making a total of 32 appearances across all competitions and scoring two goals in the league. Conclusively, Bournemouth would end the Premier League season in 13th place.

==== 2019–20 season: Relegation to the Championship ====
On 14 December 2019, Lerma provided a crucial assist for Dan Gosling's sole goal to help Bournemouth beat Chelsea 0–1 at Stamford Bridge. On 29 February 2020, he scored his third goal for the club in a 2–2 home draw against Chelsea, meeting a Ryan Fraser corner with his head to make the score 1–1. Lerma added his second assist of the season against Liverpool at Anfield, aiding Callum Wilson to lead 0–1 in the ninth minute. Despite the team's efforts, Bournemouth would finish losing 2–1, thus pushing the team down to 18th place. Lerma's side would ultimately suffer relegation to the Championship at the end of the season after finishing in 18th place.

==== 2020–21 season ====
On the opening match-day, Lerma scored Bournemouth's second to help his side win 3–2 against Blackburn Rovers. He made another notable contribution on 27 September 2020, providing Arnaut Danjuma with an important assist to help win the match 1–0 against Norwich City. For the following fixture, Lerma scored Bournemouth's first against Coventry City which ended in a 1–3 away win. In December, Lerma was charged with a biting offence relating to an act of violent conduct during a game against Sheffield Wednesday on 3 November 2020. On 12 December, Lerma provided a further assist for Dominic Solanke's 8th league goal, during Bournemouth's 5–0 thrashing over Huddersfield Town.

He received his first red card as a Bournemouth player for violent conduct on 16 January 2021, during Bournemouth's eventual 0–1 loss at home against Luton Town. On 2 April, Lerma completed his third goal of season in Bournemouth's 3–1 win against Middlesbrough. Ultimately, Bournemouth finished the season in fifth, therefore qualifying to the Championship play-offs against Brentford. Despite winning the first leg 1–0, Bournemouth would suffer a 3–1 away defeat in the second leg, thus failing to gain promotion to the Premier League.

==== 2021–22 season: Promotion to the Premier League ====
On 28 August 2021, Lerma started his first game of the season in a goal less draw away at Hull City. Lerma would be a fundamental component for Bournemouth's team dynamic during their 15-game unbeaten run. On 21 November, Lerma made his first assist of the season, providing team-mate Solanke's 14th of the season during Bournemouth's 3–2 away defeat against Derby County. On 27 November, Lerma received a straight red card during Bournemouth's 2–2 draw against Coventry City. He missed out on three league games as a result. He suffered his second red card of the season during his side's 3–1 win against Birmingham City.

Consequently, Lerma was suspended for four league matches. On 12 March, Lerma made his return from suspension against Derby County, with his team winning 2–0. Lerma effectively partnered up with Solanke once more on 15 March, when he provided an assist to help Solanke net his 22nd goal of the season. The following match-day, Lerma netted his first goal of the season in a 3–0 away victory against Huddersfield Town. On 18 April, Lerma once again provided an assist for Solanke, this time against Coventry which ended in a 0–3 away win. Following Bournemouth's impressive season, the team managed to secure a second-place league finish and were therefore promoted back to the Premier League after two seasons.

==== 2022–23 season: Final season and departure ====
On 6 August 2022, Lerma scored Bournemouth's first goal of the season during Premier League opening match-day as his team went on to defeat Aston Villa 2–0. Consequently, Lerma's goal became the fastest scored by a newly promoted side at one minute and 56 seconds. On 15 October, Lerma scored his second goal of the season in a 2–2 draw at Fulham. He scored his third Premier League goal of the season on 25 February 2023, Bournemouth's sole goal in a 1–4 home defeat to Manchester City. On 30 April, he scored two goals in four first half minutes of a 4–1 home win against Leeds United. On 31 May, it was announced that Lerma would leave Bournemouth after five years at the club.

=== Crystal Palace ===
On 8 June 2023, fellow Premier League side Crystal Palace announced they had agreed personal terms with Lerma, and that he would join the club from 1 July. He made his debut for the club on 12 August, a 1–0 away win over Sheffield United. Lerma's consistent performances throughout his first season earned him second place in Crystal Palace's 2023/24 Player of the Season awards. On 17 May 2025, Lerma played in the 2025 FA Cup final, coming on as a substitute for Marc Guehi in the second half and won an FA Cup winners medal, as Palace beat Manchester City 1–0 to secure their first major trophy.

== International career ==
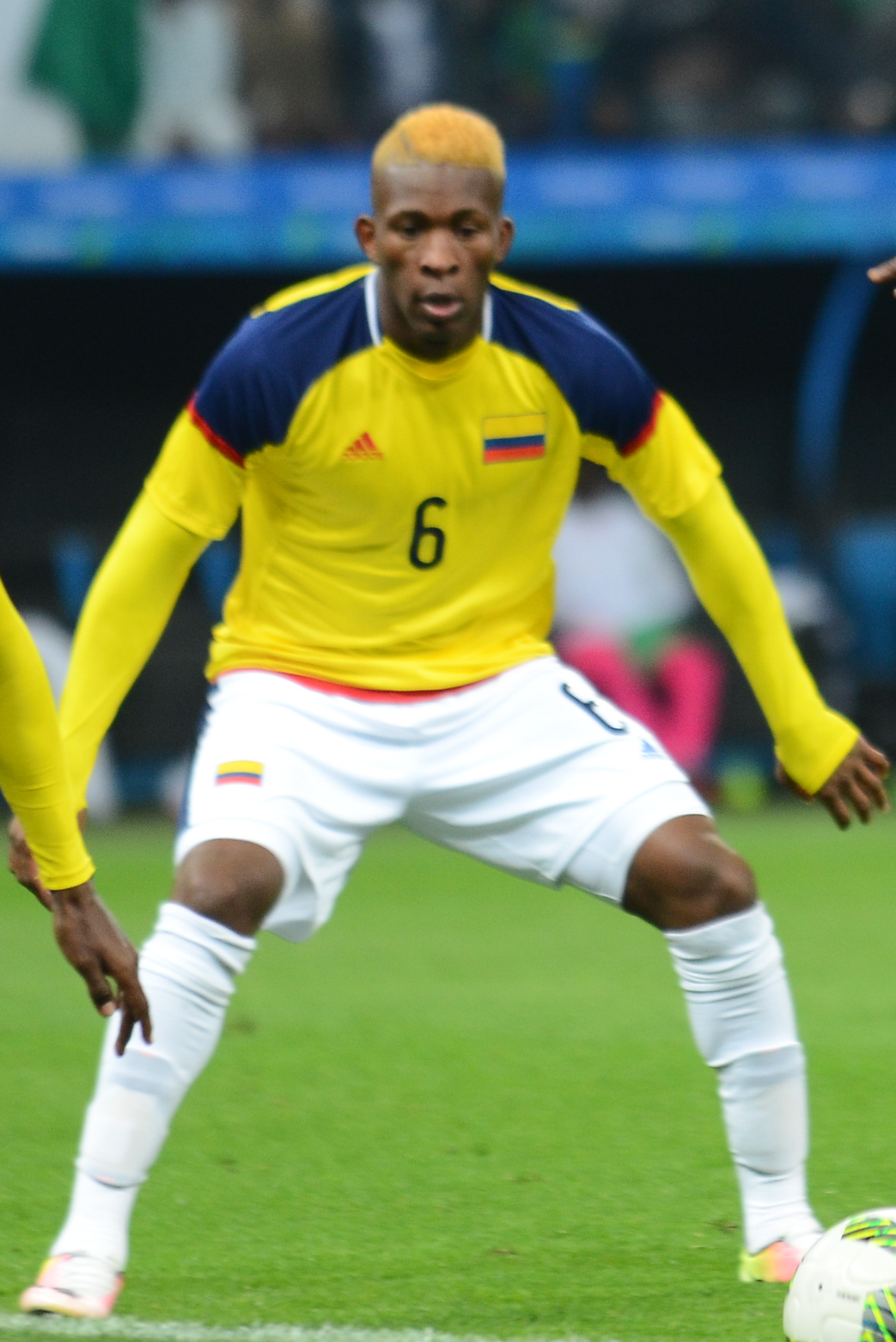
Lerma with Colombia, in action against Nigeria at the 2016 Summer Olympics.

On 14 July 2016, Lerma was called up by Colombia's Olympic manager Carlos Restrepo to compete at the 2016 Summer Olympics. In total, he appeared in three out of four matches as Colombia suffered elimination in the quarter-finals at the hands of the eventual gold-medalists Brazil.

Lerma made his debut for Colombia on 10 November 2017, coming on late for Stefan Medina in a 1–2 defeat to South Korea.

In June 2018, he was named in José Pékerman's final 23-man squad for the 2018 FIFA World Cup in Russia. He made his World Cup debut as a starter in Colombia's opening group-stage match against Japan, where Colombia lost 1–2 with Carlos Sánchez receiving a red card in the third minute of the match for a suspected handball. Lerma would go on to dispute all of Colombia's remaining matches as his country exited in the round of 16 after losing to England on penalties.

On 30 May 2019, Lerma was selected by manager Carlos Queiroz to represent Colombia at the 2019 Copa América. He made his tournament debut in Colombia's group-stage win against Argentina, coming off the bench for Juan Cuadrado and providing a 86th minute assist to Duván Zapata for Colombia's second goal which sealed a 2–0 victory. He started in Colombia's final group-stage match where Colombia beat Paraguay 1–0 to top their group with a perfect win rate and no goals conceded. For Colombia's quarter-final match against Chile, Lerma was an unused substitute; Colombia was eventually knocked out of the tournament after losing 4–5 on penalties.

On 13 October 2020, Lerma scored his first international goal in a 2022 FIFA World Cup qualification fixture over Chile, which ended 2–2.

For the 2021 Copa América, Lerma was excluded from Colombia's final squad by the newly appointed manager Reinaldo Rueda due to unspecified personal circumstances. Additionally, some theories suggested that Rueda was dissatisfied with Lerma's performance in the days leading up to the announcement. This dissatisfaction was reportedly influenced by Lerma's performance during Colombia's World Cup qualifying match against Argentina, where he was substituted in the 30th minute after Colombia conceded two goals in just eight minutes. Despite Colombia recovering to tie the match 2–2, Lerma's previous appearances, including Colombia's 0–3 home defeat to Uruguay and their 6–1 away loss to Ecuador—which led to Carlos Queiroz's dismissal—may have contributed to internal conflicts within the squad. This discord could have impacted Lerma's position on Rueda's final list, which also excluded key players such as James Rodríguez and Radamel Falcao. In response to the speculation, the Colombian Football Federation issued a statement denying any rumors regarding Lerma's exclusion and confirmed that his absence from the final list was due to an unnamed personal situation that has yet to be disclosed.

Lerma made his return to the Colombian national team on 7 October 2021, following a call-up from manager Reinaldo Rueda for the 2022 World Cup qualifiers against Uruguay and Brazil. He came on as a second-half substitute in the 0–0 draw away at Uruguay.

On 14 June 2024, Lerma was called up into 26-man squad for 2024 Copa América. He scored the winner in a 2–1 group stage win against Paraguay, and the sole goal in the semi-final against Uruguay. He started the 2024 Copa América final, Colombia's first since 2001, though they lost to Argentina.

On 25 May 2026, Lerma was named in head coach Néstor Lorenzo's final 26-man squad for the 2026 FIFA World Cup. He made his FIFA World Cup debut as a starter on 17 June in a 3–1 victory over Uzbekistan.

== Career statistics ==
=== Club ===
As of match played 31 October 2026

Appearances and goals by club, season and competition
Club	Season	League			National cup (Note: Includes Copa Colombia, Copa del Rey, FA Cup)		League cup (Note: Includes EFL Cup)		Continental		Other		Total	
Club	Season	Division	Apps	Goals	Apps	Goals	Apps	Goals	Apps	Goals	Apps	Goals	Apps	Goals
Atlético Huila	2013	Categoría Primera A	24	0	2	0	—		—		—		26	0
Atlético Huila	2014	Categoría Primera A	37	4	7	1	—		—		—		44	5
Atlético Huila	2015	Categoría Primera A	23	2	0	0	—		—		—		23	2
Atlético Huila	Total		84	6	9	1	—		—		—		93	7
Levante (loan)	2015–16	La Liga	33	1	1	0	—		—		—		34	1
Levante	2016–17	Segunda División	30	2	1	0	—		—		—		31	2
Levante	2017–18	La Liga	26	0	2	0	—		—		—		28	0
Levante	Total		89	3	4	0	—		—		—		93	3
AFC Bournemouth	2018–19	Premier League	30	2	0	0	2	0	—		—		32	2
AFC Bournemouth	2019–20	Premier League	33	1	0	0	0	0	—		—		33	1
AFC Bournemouth	2020–21	Championship	42	3	3	0	1	0	—		2 (Note: Appearances in Championship play-offs)	0	48	3
AFC Bournemouth	2021–22	Championship	34	1	0	0	0	0	—		—		34	1
AFC Bournemouth	2022–23	Premier League	37	5	0	0	0	0	—		—		37	5
AFC Bournemouth	Total		176	12	3	0	3	0	—		2	0	184	12
Crystal Palace	2023–24	Premier League	28	1	2	0	1	0	—		—		31	1
Crystal Palace	2024–25	Premier League	33	0	6	0	3	0	—		—		42	0
Crystal Palace	2025–26	Premier League	31	0	0	0	3	0	13 (Note: Appearances in UEFA Conference League)	0	1 (Note: Appearance in FA Community Shield)	0	48	0
Crystal Palace	2026–27	Premier League	5	1	0	0	2	0	0	0	—		7	1
Crystal Palace	Total		97	2	8	0	9	0	13	0	1	0	128	2
Career total			446	23	24	1	12	0	13	0	3	0	498	24

=== International ===
As of match played 7 July 2026

Appearances and goals by national team and year
National team	Year	Apps	Goals
Colombia	2017	2	0
Colombia	2018	7	0
Colombia	2019	10	0
Colombia	2020	4	1
Colombia	2021	5	0
Colombia	2022	5	0
Colombia	2023	6	0
Colombia	2024	13	2
Colombia	2025	9	1
Colombia	2026	8	0
Total		70	5

Scores and results list Colombia's goal tally first.

List of international goals scored by Jefferson Lerma
No.	Date	Venue	Cap	Opponent	Score	Result	Competition
1	13 October 2020	Estadio Nacional Julio Martínez Prádanos, Santiago, Chile	21	Chile	1–0	2–2	2022 FIFA World Cup qualification
2	24 June 2024	NRG Stadium, Houston, United States	44	Paraguay	2–0	2–1	2024 Copa América
3	10 July 2024	Bank of America Stadium, Charlotte, United States	47	Uruguay	1–0	1–0	2024 Copa América
4	11 October 2025	AT&T Stadium, Arlington, United States	59	Mexico	3–0	4–0	Friendly
5	18 November 2025	Citi Field, New York City, United States	62	Australia	3–0	3–0	Friendly

== Honours ==
Levante UD

- Segunda División: 2016–17

AFC Bournemouth

- EFL Championship second-place promotion: 2021–22

Crystal Palace

- FA Cup: 2024–25
- FA Community Shield: 2025
- UEFA Conference League: 2025–26

Colombia

- Copa América runner-up: 2024

Individual

- IFFHS Top 11 Copa América: 2024
