= Jason (Spanish footballer) =

Spanish footballer

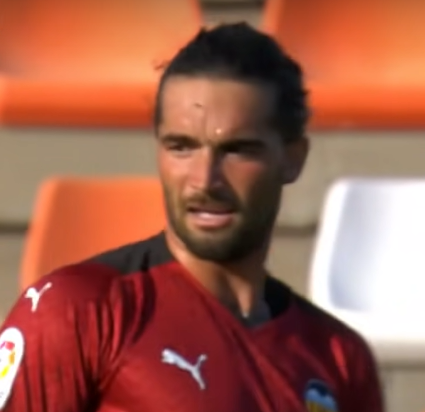
- Jason with Valencia in 2021

Personal information
- Full name: David Remeseiro Salgueiro
- Date of birth: 6 July 1994 (age 32)
- Place of birth: A Coruña, Spain
- Height: 1.78 m (5 ft 10 in)
- Position: Winger

Team information
- Current team: Al-Fayha
- Number: 23

Youth career
- 2007–2009: Deportivo La Coruña
- 2009–2011: Montañeros
- 2011–2012: Racing Ferrol
- 2012–2013: Levante

Senior career*
Years	Team	Apps	(Gls)
2013–2014	Levante B	42	(4)
2013–2019	Levante	99	(13)
2014–2015	→ Villarreal B (loan)	22	(5)
2015–2016	→ Albacete (loan)	20	(2)
2019–2022	Valencia	22	(0)
2019–2020	→ Getafe (loan)	20	(1)
2022–2023	Alavés	46	(2)
2023–2025	Arouca	66	(11)
2025–	Al-Fayha	43	(8)
- * Club domestic league appearances and goals as of 18:59, 31 October 2026 (UTC)

David Remeseiro Salgueiro (born 6 July 1994), known as Jason, is a Spanish professional footballer who plays as a right winger for Saudi Pro League club Al-Fayha.

He made over 100 La Liga appearances for Levante, Valencia, Getafe and Alavés, while also representing in Segunda División the first and last of those clubs in addition to Albacete.

== Club career ==
=== Levante ===
Born in A Coruña, Galicia, Jason played for Deportivo de La Coruña's youth setup, where a coach gave him his moniker to distinguish him from two other boys called David; he was nicknamed after British Formula 1 driver Jenson Button because of his speed. Having been released after two seasons, he finished his development at Levante UD. He began playing as a senior with the latter's reserves in 2012–13 in the Segunda División B, and on 1 July 2013 signed a new two-year deal with the club.

On 25 August 2013, Jason made his La Liga debut, featuring one minute in the 0–0 home draw against Sevilla FC. On 14 August 2014, he moved to Villarreal CF B on loan.

On 26 January 2015, Jason was recalled by Levante, and was registered with the B side but assigned to the first team. On 31 August, he joined Albacete Balompié of Segunda División on loan for one year. He scored his first goal as a professional on the following 3 January, in a 2–2 draw against SD Ponferradina at the Estadio Carlos Belmonte.

Jason returned to the Estadi Ciutat de València for 2016–17, and scored the game's only goal in an away win over CD Numancia on 21 August 2016. He added a further nine during the campaign, helping his team to return to the top flight after one year out.

=== Valencia ===
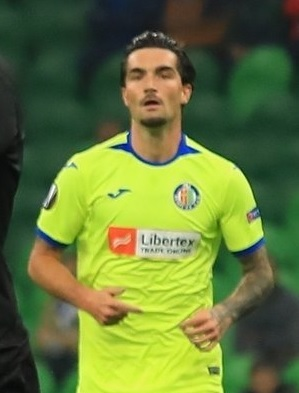
Jason with Getafe in 2019

On 1 July 2019, free agent Jason agreed a three-year contract with Valencia CF. On 2 September, however, he was loaned to fellow top-tier club Getafe CF for one year. He featured in just over half of the matches as the team from the Community of Madrid finished in eighth position, and scored once on 26 September in a 3–3 draw away to his parent club.

Jason made his debut for Los Che on 19 September 2020, as a half-time substitute in a 2–1 opening day defeat at RC Celta de Vigo.

=== Alavés ===
On 3 January 2022, Jason joined Deportivo Alavés on a three-and-a-half-year contract. He made his debut six days later in a goalless draw at home to neighbouring Athletic Bilbao, in which he was substituted for fellow newcomer Gonzalo Escalante after 41 minutes. After relegation from the top flight, he scored his first goal in over three years on 4 November, the only one of a win over Real Zaragoza also at Mendizorrotza Stadium; the direct free kick was described by visiting captain Alberto Zapater as one of the best he had seen in his career.

On 4 July 2023, after helping the club to return to the top tier at the first attempt, Jason left.

=== Arouca ===
Jason signed for F.C. Arouca in July 2023, with the duration of the deal not being disclosed; he was given the number 10 shirt. He scored 13 goals and provided seven assists during his two-year tenure, 11 in the Primeira Liga.

=== Al-Fayha ===
On 1 July 2025, Jason joined Saudi Arabian club Al-Fayha Club on a one-year contract.

== Career statistics ==
As of match played 24 May 2022

Appearances and goals by club, season and competition
Club	Season	League			National cup		Continental		Total	
Club	Season	Division	Apps	Goals	Apps	Goals	Apps	Goals	Apps	Goals
Levante	2013–14	La Liga	1	0	0	0	—		1	0
Levante	2014–15	La Liga	2	0	0	0	—		2	0
Levante	2015–16	La Liga	0	0	0	0	—		0	0
Levante	2016–17	Segunda División	39	10	0	0	—		39	10
Levante	2017–18	La Liga	27	1	2	0	—		29	1
Levante	2018–19	La Liga	30	2	4	0	—		34	2
Levante	Total		99	13	6	0	0	0	105	13
Villarreal B (loan)	2014–15	Segunda División B	22	5	—		—		22	5
Albacete (loan)	2015–16	Segunda División	20	2	1	0	—		21	2
Valencia	2019–20	La Liga	0	0	0	0	—		0	0
Valencia	2020–21	La Liga	17	0	4	0	—		21	0
Valencia	2021–22	La Liga	5	0	2	0	—		7	0
Valencia	Total		22	0	6	0	0	0	28	0
Getafe (loan)	2019–20	La Liga	20	1	2	0	4 (Note: Appearances in UEFA Europa League)	0	26	1
Alavés	2021–22	La Liga	14	0	0	0	–		14	0
Career total			197	21	15	0	4	0	216	21

== Honours ==
Levante

- Segunda División: 2016–17
