= Víctor Camarasa =

Spanish footballer (born 1994)

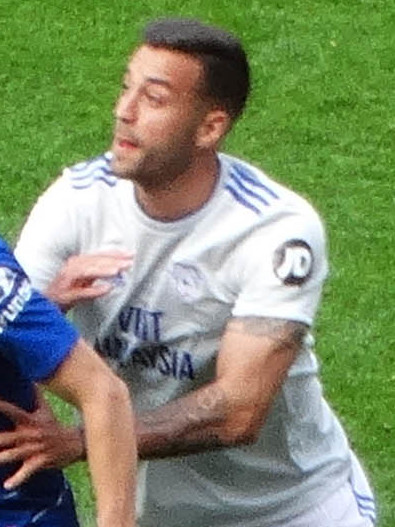
- Camarasa with Cardiff City in 2018

Personal information
- Full name: Víctor Camarasa Ferrando
- Date of birth: 28 May 1994 (age 32)
- Place of birth: Meliana, Spain
- Height: 1.83 m (6 ft 0 in)
- Position: Central midfielder

Team information
- Current team: Kitchee
- Number: 15

Youth career
- 2001–2011: Valencia
- 2011–2012: Alcoyano
- 2012–2013: Levante

Senior career*
Years	Team	Apps	(Gls)
2013–2014	Levante B	27	(0)
2014–2017	Levante	61	(4)
2016–2017	→ Alavés (loan)	31	(3)
2017–2023	Betis	31	(1)
2018–2019	→ Cardiff City (loan)	32	(5)
2019–2020	→ Crystal Palace (loan)	1	(0)
2020	→ Alavés (loan)	17	(0)
2023–2024	Oviedo	21	(2)
2024–2025	Eldense	27	(0)
2025–2026	Debreceni	5	(0)
2026–	Kitchee	6	(1)

International career
2014–2017	Spain U21	4	(0)
- * Club domestic league appearances and goals as of 21 November 2026

Víctor Camarasa Ferrando (born 28 May 1994) is a Spanish professional footballer who plays as a central midfielder for Hong Kong Premier League club Kitchee.

== Club career ==
=== Levante ===
Born in Meliana, Valencian Community, Camarasa joined local Valencia CF's youth academy in 2001, aged seven. Ten years later he was released, and eventually finished his development with neighbouring Levante UD, making his senior debut with the reserves in the 2012–13 season, in the Segunda División B.

On 7 December 2013, Camarasa played his first competitive game with the main squad, starting in a 1–0 away loss against Recreativo de Huelva in the round of 32 of the Copa del Rey. He signed a new six-year deal with the club two days later, and scored his first goal on the 17th to help to turn the Cup deficit in his team's favour by closing the 4–0 home win.

Camarasa made his La Liga debut on 4 January 2014, coming on as a substitute for Simão Mate in a 2–0 defeat at Valencia CF. He was promoted to the first team in July, and was made a starter by new manager José Luis Mendilibar.

On 4 October 2014, Camarasa scored his first goal in the top flight, netting his side's second in a 3–3 draw at SD Eibar. On 11 August 2016, after suffering relegation, he was loaned to Deportivo Alavés also of the top tier for one year.

=== Betis ===
On 29 June 2017, Camarasa signed a five-year contract with Real Betis in the same league. He scored his first competitive goal for them on 18 December, helping close a 2–0 away victory over Málaga CF.

On 9 August 2018, Camarasa joined Cardiff City on loan for the upcoming campaign. He made his Premier League debut nine days later, playing 76 minutes in a 0–0 home draw against Newcastle United. His first goal came on 2 September, but in a 3–2 loss to Arsenal also at the Cardiff City Stadium.

In August 2019, Camarasa signed with Crystal Palace on loan until the following 30 June, with an option to make the move permanent afterwards. He made his debut on 27 August in a 0–0 home draw against Colchester United in the second round of the EFL Cup, with the tie being lost after a penalty shoot-out.

Camarasa returned to both Alavés and the Spanish top division on 13 January 2020, agreeing to a six-month loan deal. He missed the entire 2020–21 due to an anterior cruciate ligament injury.

On 31 January 2023, Camarasa left the Estadio Benito Villamarín.

=== Oviedo ===
On 1 February 2023, Segunda División club Real Oviedo announced an agreement in principle with Camarasa for him to join until the end of the season. In September, he took a leave of absence for an indeterminate period to "take care of his mental health".

Camarasa left in July 2024, after his contract expired.

=== Later career ===
On 10 July 2024, Camarasa agreed to a one-year deal at fellow second-tier CD Eldense. In September 2025, he moved to the Hungarian Nemzeti Bajnokság I on a contract at Debreceni VSC.

On 24 August 2026, Camarasa joined Hong Kong Premier League side Kitchee SC.

== International career ==
Camarasa won the first of his four caps for Spain at under-21 level on 12 November 2014, playing 25 minutes in a 4–1 friendly home loss to Belgium.

== Career statistics ==
As of 21 December 2025

Appearances and goals by club, season and competition
Club	Season	League			National Cup		League Cup		Other		Total	
Club	Season	Division	Apps	Goals	Apps	Goals	Apps	Goals	Apps	Goals	Apps	Goals
Levante B	2012–13	Segunda División B	1	0	—		—		—		1	0
Levante B	2013–14	Segunda División B	26	0	—		—		—		26	0
Levante B	Total		27	0	—		—		—		27	0
Levante	2013–14	La Liga	3	0	6	1	—		0	0	9	1
Levante	2014–15	La Liga	24	2	4	0	—		0	0	28	2
Levante	2015–16	La Liga	34	2	0	0	—		0	0	34	2
Levante	Total		61	4	10	1	—		0	0	71	5
Alavés (loan)	2016–17	La Liga	31	3	6	0	—		0	0	37	3
Betis	2017–18	La Liga	24	1	2	0	—		0	0	26	1
Betis	2020–21	La Liga	0	0	0	0	—		0	0	0	0
Betis	2021–22	La Liga	7	0	0	0	—		0	0	7	0
Betis	2022–23	La Liga	0	0	0	0	—		0	0	0	0
Betis	Total		31	1	2	0	—		0	0	33	1
Cardiff City (loan)	2018–19	Premier League	32	5	0	0	1	0	—		33	5
Crystal Palace (loan)	2019–20	Premier League	1	0	0	0	1	0	—		2	0
Alavés (loan)	2019–20	La Liga	17	0	0	0	—		—		17	0
Oviedo	2022–23	Segunda División	11	0	—		—		—		11	0
Oviedo	2023–24	Segunda División	10	2	2	0	—		0	0	12	2
Oviedo	Total		21	2	2	0	—		0	0	23	2
Eldense	2024–25	Segunda División	27	0	0	0	—		—		27	0
Debreceni	2025–26	Nemzeti Bajnokság I	1	0	1	0	—		0	0	2	0
Career total			249	15	21	1	2	0	0	0	272	16
