= Rubén García (footballer, born 1993) =

Spanish footballer

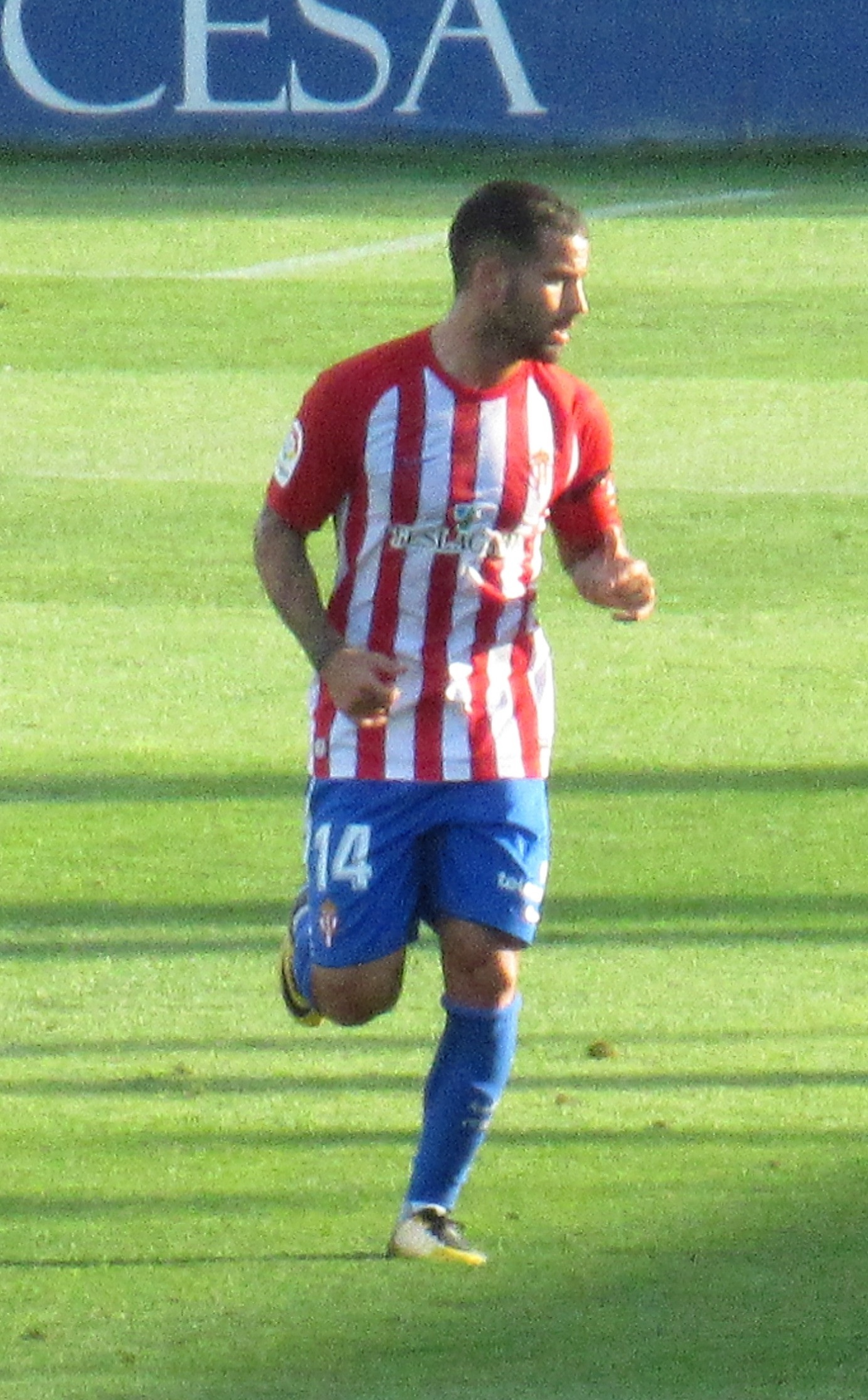
- García with Sporting Gijón in 2017

Personal information
- Full name: Rubén García Santos
- Date of birth: 14 July 1993 (age 33)
- Place of birth: Xàtiva, Spain
- Height: 1.71 m (5 ft 7 in)
- Position: Winger

Team information
- Current team: Osasuna
- Number: 14

Youth career
- 2008–2010: Valencia
- 2010–2011: Levante

Senior career*
Years	Team	Apps	(Gls)
2010–2012	Levante B	20	(3)
2012–2018	Levante	129	(8)
2017–2018	→ Sporting Gijón (loan)	41	(8)
2018–	Osasuna	283	(31)

International career
2013	Spain U20	5	(1)
2013	Spain U21	1	(0)
- * Club domestic league appearances and goals as of 01:19, 8 November 2026 (UTC)

Rubén García Santos (born 14 July 1993) is a Spanish professional footballer who plays as a left winger for La Liga club Osasuna.

He represented mainly Levante and Osasuna during his career, making more than 300 competitive appearances for the latter. He played over 350 games in La Liga, and also won the Segunda División with both clubs.

García earned caps for Spain at youth level.

== Club career ==
=== Levante ===
Born in Xàtiva, Valencian Community, García graduated from local Levante UD's youth system, making his senior debut with the reserves in the Tercera División. In 2011, he was linked with a move back to Valencia CF, but a deal could not be reached; the following 31 January, he signed a professional contract until 2016.

On 2 September 2012, García made his first La Liga appearance, coming on as a substitute for Nabil El Zhar in a 3–2 home win over RCD Espanyol. On 21 October, in the same competition, he provided an assist to Míchel for the game's only goal against Getafe CF.

García scored his first top-division goal on 9 December 2012, the third of a 4–0 home defeat of RCD Mallorca; in the process, he became the club's youngest player ever to achieve this at the age of 19 years, 4 months and 26 days. He was permanently promoted to the first team in January 2013, being assigned the number 11.

On 28 July 2017, after making 17 scoreless appearances in a promotion to the top flight, García was loaned to Segunda División club Sporting de Gijón for one year. He netted eight goals during his sole season, adding as many assists.

=== Osasuna ===
On 20 August 2018, García agreed to a three-year deal at fellow second-tier CA Osasuna on a free transfer – Levante also retained 50% of the player's federative rights. The following 21 June, after helping them to achieve promotion as champions, to which he contributed seven goals and nine assists, he was bought outright and extended his contract at the El Sadar Stadium until 2023.

García equalled a career-best eight goals in the 2019–20 season. He signed another extension in October 2020, running until the end of 2023–24.

== International career ==
In January 2012, García was called to train with the Spain under-19 side. He made his debut for the under-21s on 14 November 2013, replacing Álvaro Morata for the final 20 minutes of a 6–1 away victory over Bosnia and Herzegovina in the 2015 UEFA European Championship qualifiers.

== Career statistics ==
As of match played 23 May 2026

Appearances and goals by club, season and competition
Club	Season	League			National cup		Continental		Other		Total	
Club	Season	Division	Apps	Goals	Apps	Goals	Apps	Goals	Apps	Goals	Apps	Goals
Levante B	2012–13	Segunda División B	2	1	—		—		—		2	1
Levante	2012–13	La Liga	31	4	3	0	10 (Note: Appearances in UEFA Europa League)	0	—		44	4
Levante	2013–14	La Liga	32	2	2	1	—		—		34	3
Levante	2014–15	La Liga	27	1	3	0	—		—		30	1
Levante	2015–16	La Liga	22	1	1	0	—		—		23	1
Levante	2016–17	Segunda División	17	0	1	0	—		—		18	0
Levante	Total		129	8	10	1	10	0	—		149	9
Sporting Gijón (loan)	2017–18	Segunda División	41	8	0	0	—		2 (Note: Appearances in La Liga play-offs)	0	43	8
Osasuna	2018–19	Segunda División	37	7	1	0	—		—		38	7
Osasuna	2019–20	La Liga	30	8	1	0	—		—		31	8
Osasuna	2020–21	La Liga	37	3	2	0	—		—		39	3
Osasuna	2021–22	La Liga	37	1	1	0	—		—		38	1
Osasuna	2022–23	La Liga	29	2	8	2	—		—		37	4
Osasuna	2023–24	La Liga	30	3	2	0	2 (Note: Appearances in UEFA Europa Conference League)	0	—		34	3
Osasuna	2024–25	La Liga	36	5	4	0	—		—		40	5
Osasuna	2025–26	La Liga	35	2	4	0	—		—		39	2
Osasuna	Total		271	31	23	2	2	0	—		296	33
Career total			443	48	33	3	12	0	2	0	490	51

== Honours ==
Levante

- Segunda División: 2016–17

Osasuna

- Segunda División: 2018–19
- Copa del Rey runner-up: 2022–23
