= Simão Mate Junior =

Mozambican footballer

Simão Mate
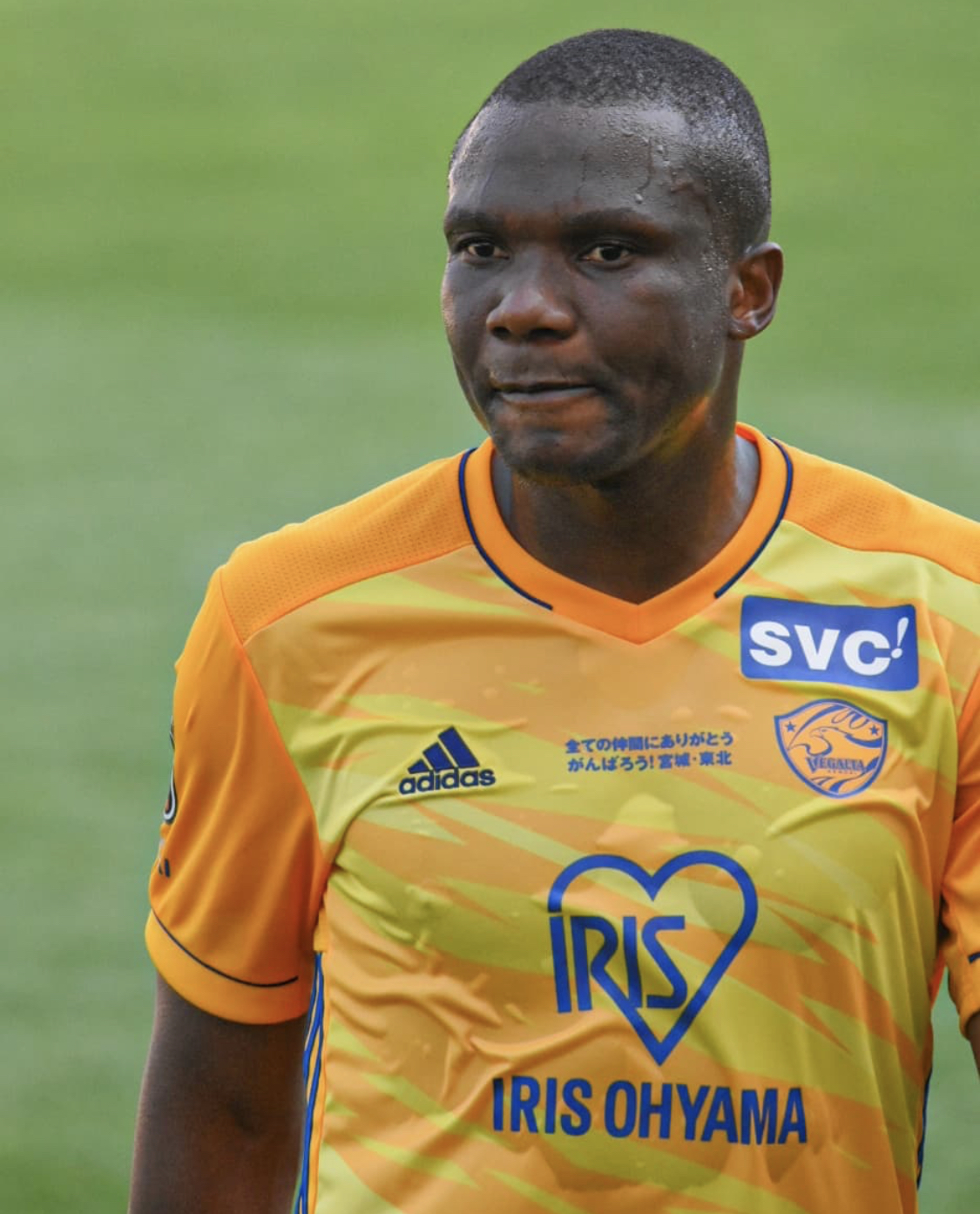
- Simão with Vegalta Sendai in 2021

Personal information
- Full name: Simão Mate Junior
- Date of birth: 23 June 1988 (age 38)
- Place of birth: Maputo, Mozambique
- Height: 1.80 m (5 ft 11 in)
- Position: Defensive midfielder

Youth career
- 2005–2007: Ferroviário Maputo

Senior career*
Years	Team	Apps	(Gls)
2007–2012	Panathinaikos	118	(1)
2012–2013	Shandong Luneng	17	(1)
2013–2016	Levante	92	(3)
2017–2018	Al Ahli SC	19	(0)
2019–2021	Vegalta Sendai	48	(4)

International career
2007–2016	Mozambique	42	(0)
- * Club domestic league appearances and goals as of 11 August 2021

Simão Mate Junior (born 23 June 1988) is a Mozambican professional footballer who plays as a defensive midfielder.

He is also a member of the Mozambique national team, for which he has made 30 appearances since 2007. He represented the nation at the 2010 Africa Cup of Nations.

== Career ==
Simão Mate started his career at Mozambican club Clube Ferroviário de Maputo in 2005. He was brought to Greece in August 2007 by José Peseiro, who was then the head coach of Panathinaikos, in order to be tested and after a three-week trial, he signed a four-year deal with the Greek club.

He managed to surprise his coach and the team's fans with his solidness, strength and tenacity. Despite his young age, he made some first-team appearances and became a precious solution for his coach Henk ten Cate. Although he was signed in order to play as a defender, circumstances and teammates' injuries made the team's coach to use Simão as a defensive midfielder, actually the player is established at fans' minds as a midfielder rather than a defender.

Simão was particularly impressive in the minds of many Panathinaikos supporters which came as a surprise, given his relative anonymity and small transfer cost. His debut season was a great success; Simão made 27 first-team appearances. In his second season, he scored a superb volley in Panathinaikos' UEFA Champions League third round qualifying match, away to Sparta Prague. He continued to impress domestically and in the Champions League proper, notably marking Diego and nullifying his attacks in Panathinaikos' 3–0 victory against Werder Bremen.

Simão was also included in Tuttosport's list of the top-rated 40 young footballers in the world, becoming the first player of Mozambique to achieve this accolade. On 20 February 2009, Simão signed a new contract with Panathinaikos which included a higher release clause. Simão also is among the Top-10 Rising Stars for the UEFA Champions League Competition for the 2008–09 season. On 18 February he scored his first goal which came in an away match against Crete-based Ergotelis for the 2011–12 season.

On 14 June 2012, 16 days before his contract ran out, Simao was released from the club.

On 19 June 2012, Simão signed a contract with Chinese Super League side Shandong Luneng Taishan, rejoining former Panathinaikos manager Henk ten Cate. He made his Super League debut four days later, in a 3–1 home victory against Shanghai Shenxin, ending Shandong's seven-league-match winless run. His position in the club became unstable after ten Cate was sacked in September 2012. Radomir Antić, new manager of the club preferred Roda Antar more in the defensive midfielder position. Simão was released by Shandong in early 2013.

Simão made a free move to La Liga club Levante UD in March 2013. On 20 April, Simão made his debut against FC Barcelona and put in an assured display alongside Pape Diop in the centre of midfield.

On 29 December 2018, Simão signed a contract with Vegalta Sendai.

== Career statistics ==
As of 7 November 2020

Appearances and goals by club, season and competition
Club	Season	League			Cup		Continental		Total	
Club	Season	Division	Apps	Goals	Apps	Goals	Apps	Goals	Apps	Goals
Panathinaikos	2007–08	Super League Greece	21	0	–		–		21	0
Panathinaikos	2008–09	Super League Greece	29	0	–		11	1	40	1
Panathinaikos	2009–10	Super League Greece	18	0	2	0	12	0	32	0
Panathinaikos	2010–11	Super League Greece	22	0	2	0	5	0	28	0
Panathinaikos	2011–12	Super League Greece	29	1	2	0	3	0	33	1
Panathinaikos	Total		118	1	6	0	31	1	155	2
Shandong Luneng	2012	Chinese Super League	17	1	4	1	–		21	2
Levante	2012–13	La Liga	4	0			–		4	0
Levante	2013–14	La Liga	31	1	2	1	–		33	2
Levante	2014–15	La Liga	27	1	2	0	–		29	1
Levante	2015–16	La Liga	30	1	0	0	–		30	1
Levante	Total		92	3	4	1	0	0	96	4
Al Ahli SC	2017–18	Qatar Stars League	22	1	3	1	–		24	2
Vegalta Sendai	2019	J1 League	24	3	6	0	–		30	3
Vegalta Sendai	2020	J1 League	13	1	1	0	–		14	1
Vegalta Sendai	Total		37	4	7	0	0	0	44	4
Career total			270	10	22	3	31	1	332	14

=== International ===
Appearances and goals by national team and year
National team	Year	Apps	Goals
Mozambique	2007	6	0
Mozambique	2008	8	0
Mozambique	2009	6	0
Mozambique	2010	7	0
Mozambique	2011	1	0
Mozambique	2012	5	0
Mozambique	2013	–	
Mozambique	2014	7	0
Mozambique	2015	–	
Mozambique	2016	2	0
Total		42	0

== Honours ==
Panathinaikos

- Super League Greece: 2009–10
- Greek Football Cup: 2009–10

Vegalta Sendai

- J.League Monthly MVP: 2019 (June)
