= Roger Martí =

Spanish footballer

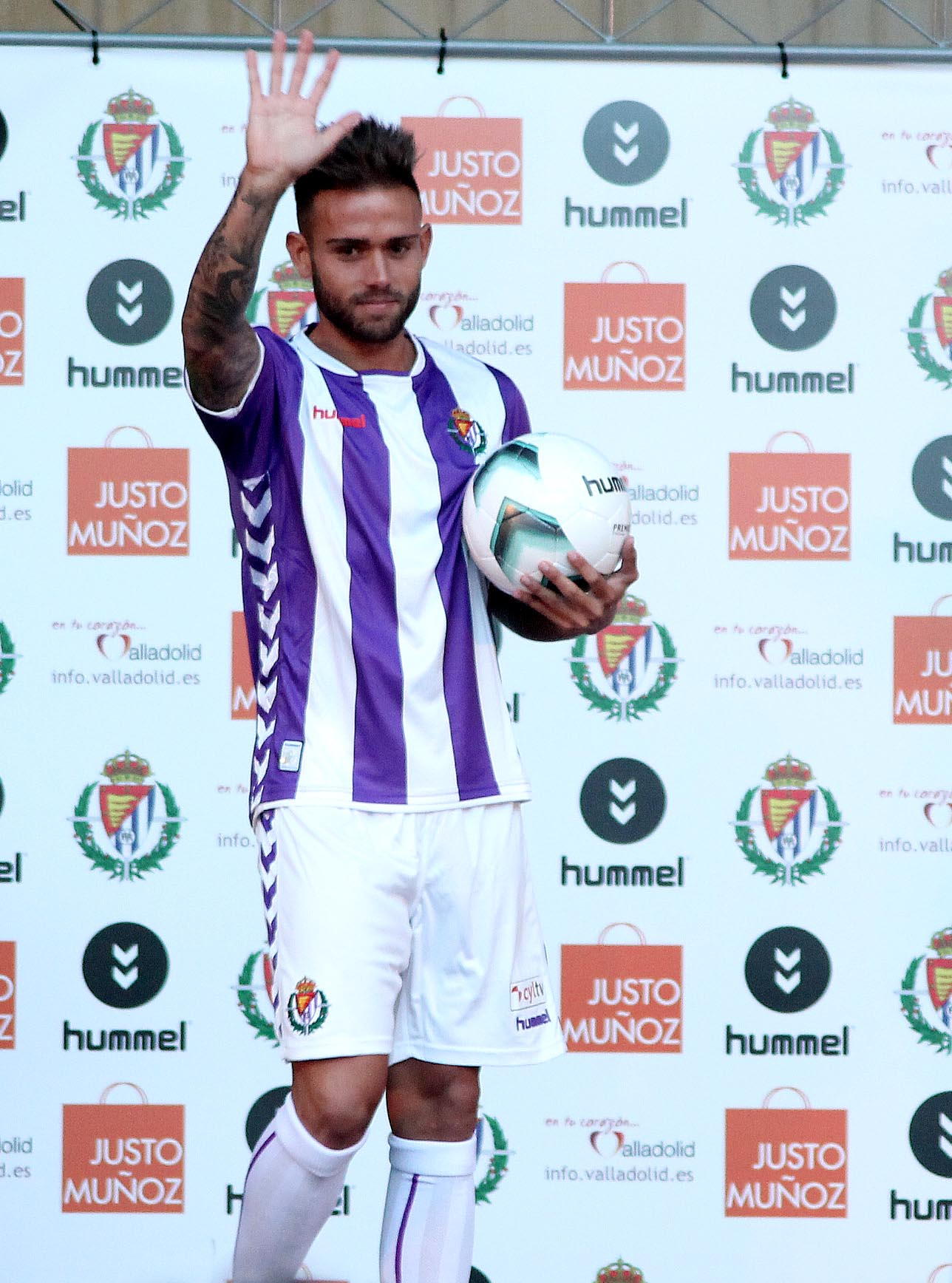
- Roger with Valladolid in 2014

Personal information
- Full name: Roger Martí Salvador
- Date of birth: 3 January 1991 (age 35)
- Place of birth: Torrent, Spain
- Height: 1.79 m (5 ft 10 in)
- Position: Forward

Youth career
- 2007–2009: Valencia

Senior career*
Years	Team	Apps	(Gls)
2009–2011	Valencia B	15	(1)
2010–2011	→ Burjassot (loan)	13	(4)
2011–2013	Levante B	54	(34)
2011–2022	Levante	216	(69)
2013–2014	→ Zaragoza (loan)	36	(12)
2014–2015	→ Valladolid (loan)	18	(6)
2016	→ Valladolid (loan)	19	(8)
2022–2023	Elche	12	(0)
2023	→ Cádiz (loan)	14	(1)
2023–2026	Cádiz	73	(8)
- * Club domestic league appearances and goals as of 31 May 2026

Roger Martí Salvador (born 3 January 1991), known as Roger, is a former Spanish professional footballer who plays as a forward.

== Club career ==
=== Valencia ===
Born in Torrent, Valencian Community, Roger graduated from local Valencia CF's youth system. In January 2011, after a handful of games with the reserves, he was loaned to neighbouring amateurs Burjassot CF.

=== Levante ===
In July 2011, Roger signed with another team in the community, Levante UD, being assigned to the B team in Tercera División. He made his debut with the main squad on 21 December, replacing injured Juanlu in a 4–1 home win against Deportivo de La Coruña in the round of 32 of the Copa del Rey (5–4 aggregate win).

Roger made his La Liga debut on 15 January 2012, taking the place of Xavi Torres for the last ten minutes of the 3–0 away loss to Athletic Bilbao. He had scored his first goal with Levante's first team four days earlier, the second in a 4–0 home defeat of AD Alcorcón in the domestic cup (5–2 on aggregate).

Roger scored his first top-flight goal on 2 December 2012, helping to a 1–1 draw at RC Celta de Vigo. On 6 August 2013, he was loaned to Real Zaragoza of Segunda División for one year.

On 8 July 2014, Roger joined Real Valladolid also in the second division, in a season-long loan deal. He appeared sparingly for the club mainly due to a knee injury suffered in September, only returning to the fields in April.

Roger returned to Valladolid on loan, on 28 January 2016. He scored a brace in a 2–2 home draw against CD Numancia on 21 February, and finished the campaign with eight goals.

Roger returned to Levante for 2016–17, with the club now in the second tier. He netted twice against AD Alcorcón (2–0 home win) and former sides Zaragoza and Valladolid (respectively 4–2 and 3–2 home victories), as well as once in a 2–2 away draw with UD Almería, taking his tally up to seven in only ten matches; he went on to rank second in the goal charts at 22, helping to a return to the top flight as champions.

Roger suffered another knee injury in the 2017 pre-season, being sidelined for six months. On 29 June 2018, he extended his contract until 2023.

On 20 October 2018, Roger scored from the penalty spot to contribute to a 2–1 victory over Real Madrid at the Santiago Bernabéu Stadium. He finished the season with a squad-best 13 goals, repeating the feat in the following with 11.

=== Elche and Cádiz ===
On 4 August 2022, after Levante's relegation, Roger remained in the top flight after signing a four-year contract with Elche CF. In January 2023, he moved to Cádiz CF on loan for the remainder of the season. On 2 July, having avoided a drop, he agreed to a permanent deal with the club until 2026.

On 9 November 2026, at the age of 35, he announced his retirement from football, assigning 151 contributions (134 goals and 17 assists) in total of 435 matches.

== Career statistics ==
As of match played 25 May 2024

Appearances and goals by club, season and competition
Club	Season	League			National Cup		Continental		Other		Total	
Club	Season	Division	Apps	Goals	Apps	Goals	Apps	Goals	Apps	Goals	Apps	Goals
Levante	2011–12	La Liga	2	0	4	1	–		–		6	1
Levante	2012–13	La Liga	15	1	3	1	0	0	–		18	2
Levante	2015–16	La Liga	16	0	2	1	–		–		18	1
Levante	2016–17	Segunda División	37	22	1	1	–		–		38	23
Levante	2017–18	La Liga	17	3	0	0	–		–		17	3
Levante	2018–19	La Liga	31	13	0	0	–		–		31	13
Levante	2019–20	La Liga	36	11	2	0	–		–		38	11
Levante	2020–21	La Liga	33	12	5	2	–		–		38	14
Levante	2021–22	La Liga	29	7	1	0	–		–		30	7
Levante	Total		216	69	18	6	0	0	—		234	75
Zaragoza (loan)	2013–14	Segunda División	36	12	1	0	—		—		37	12
Valladolid (loan)	2014–15	Segunda División	16	6	1	0	—		—		19	6
Valladolid (loan)	2015–16	Segunda División	19	8	—		—		—		19	8
Elche	2022–23	La Liga	12	0	3	2	—		—		15	2
Cádiz (loan)	2022–23	La Liga	14	1	—		—		—		14	1
Cádiz	2023–24	La Liga	23	2	0	0	—		—		23	2
Cádiz	Total		37	3	0	0	—		—		37	3
Career total			336	98	18	3	0	0	0	0	354	101

== Honours ==
Levante

- Segunda División: 2016–17
