= Juan Delgado (Spanish footballer) =

Spanish footballer

Personal information
- Full name: Juan Delgado Sirvent
- Date of birth: 3 January 1994 (age 32)
- Place of birth: Elda, Spain
- Height: 1.84 m (6 ft 0 in)
- Position: Forward

Youth career
- Valencia

Senior career*
Years	Team	Apps	(Gls)
2012–2014	Valencia B	35	(2)
2014	→ Celta B (loan)	6	(0)
2014–2019	Levante B	146	(43)
2015	Levante	0	(0)
2017–2020	→ Hércules (loan)	13	(2)
2019–2020	Barakaldo	22	(5)
2020–2021	Olot	28	(6)
2021–2022	Ibiza IP	33	(17)
2022	Sabadell	13	(2)
2023	La Nucía	19	(3)
2023	Arenteiro	12	(0)
2024	La Nucía	17	(3)
2024	Águilas	8	(0)
2025	Ibiza Islas Pitiusas	14	(3)
2025–2026	Utebo	26	(7)

International career
2009	Spain U16	4	(0)
2011	Spain U17	1	(0)
- * Club domestic league appearances and goals as of 7 May 2026

Juan Delgado Sirvent (born 1 March 1994) is a Spanish footballer who plays as a forward.

== Club career ==
Born in Elda, Alicante, Valencian Community, Delgado finished his formation with Valencia CF. He made his senior debuts with the reserve team in the 2011–12 season, in Segunda División B.

On 14 January 2014 Delgado signed a new two-year deal with the Che, and was loaned to Celta de Vigo B, until June. On 16 July he joined another reserve team, Levante UD B also in the third level.

Delgado made his first appearance with the main squad on 6 January 2015, coming on as a substitute for Rafael Martins in the 80th minute of a 0–2 away loss against Málaga CF, for the campaign's Copa del Rey.
