= Jordi Xumetra =

Spanish footballer (born 1985)

Personal information
- Full name: Jordi Xumetra Feliú
- Date of birth: 24 October 1985 (age 41)
- Place of birth: L'Estartit, Spain
- Height: 1.76 m (5 ft 9 1/2 in)
- Position: Winger

Youth career
- 2001–2004: Barcelona

Senior career*
Years	Team	Apps	(Gls)
2004–2005	Figueres	30	(7)
2005–2006	Espanyol B	12	(1)
2006–2010	Girona	113	(11)
2010–2013	Elche	117	(17)
2013–2016	Levante	56	(1)
2016–2017	Zaragoza	23	(0)
2018–2021	Olot	95	(21)
2021	Costa Brava	16	(3)
2022–2023	Olot	50	(8)
2023–2024	L'Escala	33	(9)
Total		545	(78)

International career
2013	Catalonia	1	(0)
- * Club domestic league appearances and goals

Jordi Xumetra Feliú (born 24 October 1985) is a Spanish former professional footballer who played as a right winger.

== Club career ==
Born in L'Estartit, Girona, Catalonia, Xumetra finished his development at FC Barcelona, but only played for Tercera División clubs in his first years as senior. In 2006, he signed with Girona FC also in that league, being part of the squads that achieved two consecutive promotions in two years.

On 30 August 2008, Xumetra appeared in his first match as a professional, coming on as a late substitute in a 1–0 away win over RC Celta de Vigo in the Segunda División. His first goal came on 14 February of the following year, as he scored his side's last in a 3–3 home draw against Albacete Balompié.

Xumetra moved to Elche CF, also of the second tier, on 3 July 2010. He scored seven goals in his second year, repeating the feat the following season as the Valencian Community side returned to La Liga after 24 years.

On 5 June 2013, Xumetra joined Levante UD on a three-year contract. He made his top-flight debut on 18 August, starting in a 7–0 loss at Barcelona. He scored his only goal in the Spanish top division on 29 September, the game's only in an away victory over CA Osasuna.

On 13 July 2016, Xumetra agreed to a two-year deal with Real Zaragoza as a free agent. He continued to play well into his 30s in the lower leagues or amateur football, with UE Olot (two spells), UE Costa Brava and FC L'Escala.

== International career ==
Xumetra won one cap for Catalonia, playing 45 minutes of a 4–1 friendly victory against Cape Verde on 30 December 2013.

== Honours ==
Girona

- Segunda División B: 2007–08

Elche

- Segunda División: 2012–13
