= Iván López (footballer, born 1993) =

Spanish footballer

Personal information
- Full name: Iván López Mendoza
- Date of birth: 23 August 1993 (age 33)
- Place of birth: Valencia, Spain
- Height: 1.75 m (5 ft 9 in)
- Position: Right-back

Youth career
- 2008–2011: Levante

Senior career*
Years	Team	Apps	(Gls)
2011–2013	Levante B	86	(0)
2012–2020	Levante	52	(0)
2013–2014	→ Girona (loan)	29	(1)
2018–2019	→ Gimnàstic (loan)	7	(0)
Total		174	(1)

International career
2012	Spain U19	3	(0)
2012	Spain U20	4	(0)
- * Club domestic league appearances and goals

Iván López Mendoza (born 23 August 1993) is a Spanish former professional footballer who played as a right-back.

== Club career ==
Born in Valencia, Valencian Community, López began playing football with local club Levante UD. He spent the vast majority of his first years as a senior with the B team, starting in the Tercera División.

On 13 December 2011, López made his first-team debut, in a 3–1 away defeat against Deportivo de La Coruña in that season's Copa del Rey. He returned to action with the main squad on 26 January 2012, and again featured the 90 minutes, now in the 0–3 home loss to Valencia CF in the same competition.

On 17 July 2013, López was loaned to Girona FC of Segunda División. He scored his only professional goal on 16 February of the following year, the third in a 6–0 home rout of CD Lugo.

López made his La Liga debut on 30 August 2014, replacing the injured Nikos Karabelas in the seventh minute of a 3–0 loss at Athletic Bilbao. In July 2015, he signed a new five-year contract until 2020; in October 2017, he suffered a cruciate ligament injury to his left knee during training, going on to be sidelined for several months.

On 28 August 2018, López was loaned to second-tier side Gimnàstic de Tarragona for one season.
