= Toño García (footballer, born 1989) =

Spanish footballer

Toño
Personal information
- Full name: Antonio García Aranda
- Date of birth: 7 November 1989 (age 36)
- Place of birth: Alcalá de Henares, Spain
- Height: 1.79 m (5 ft 10 in)
- Position: Left-back

Senior career*
Years	Team	Apps	(Gls)
2008–2009	Saguntino	18	(0)
2009–2010	Castellón B	37	(3)
2009–2011	Castellón	35	(0)
2011–2014	Villarreal B	41	(0)
2013	→ Sabadell (loan)	2	(0)
2014	Recreativo	13	(0)
2014–2021	Levante	147	(1)
2021–2022	Eibar	34	(0)
- * Club domestic league appearances and goals as of 29 May 2022

Antonio García Aranda (born 7 November 1989), known as Toño (Spanish pronunciation: [ˈtoɲo]), is a Spanish professional footballer who plays as a left-back.

== Club career ==
Born in Alcalá de Henares, Community of Madrid, Toño made his debut as a senior with Atlético Saguntino in the regional leagues. He signed with CD Castellón in summer 2009, being assigned to the reserves also in the fifth division.

Toño played his first match as a professional on 5 September 2009, featuring the last 14 minutes of a 2–0 away loss against Recreativo de Huelva in the Segunda División. He was handed his first start on the 26th, in the 1–3 home defeat to Rayo Vallecano.

Toño was definitely promoted to the first team in August 2010, with the Valencians now in the Segunda División B. He appeared in 25 matches during the season, but the club dropped another level due to financial problems.

On 9 June 2011, Toño joined Villarreal CF's reserves for a €25,000 fee. He acted mainly as a backup to Pere Martínez, playing 18 times as they were relegated from the second tier.

On 15 January 2013, Toño was loaned to CE Sabadell FC until June. In February, however, he suffered a severe knee injury which sidelined him for the remainder of the campaign.

On 5 January 2014, Toño moved to Recreativo de Huelva after agreeing to an 18-month contract, with his former team also having a buy-back option. He featured regularly for the Andalusians during his short spell, totaling 1,055 minutes to help to a final eighth position.

Toño signed a five-year deal with La Liga side Levante UD on 26 August 2014, for an undisclosed fee. He made his debut in the competition 13 September, starting in a 0–0 away draw against Málaga CF.

Toño scored his first goal in the Spanish top flight – and as a professional – on 30 September 2018, helping the hosts defeat Deportivo Alavés 2–1. He left on 30 June 2021 after his contract expired.

On 2 August 2021, Toño signed a one-year deal with SD Eibar, recently relegated to the second division.

== Personal life ==
Toño's father, also named Antonio, was a goalkeeper. He appeared in the Spanish top tier with Valencia CF in the 80s.

In February 2019, Toño was arrested on suspicion of money laundering and extortion. He was released the following month, without bail.

== Honours ==
Levante

- Segunda División: 2016–17
