= Víctor Casadesús =

Spanish footballer

Personal information
- Full name: Víctor Manuel Casadesús Castaño
- Date of birth: 28 February 1985 (age 41)
- Place of birth: Algaida, Spain
- Height: 1.80 m (5 ft 11 in)
- Position: Forward

Youth career
- Mallorca

Senior career*
Years	Team	Apps	(Gls)
2003–2005	Mallorca B	50	(19)
2005–2014	Mallorca	220	(42)
2008	→ Real Sociedad (loan)	19	(6)
2008–2009	→ Gimnàstic (loan)	36	(13)
2014–2017	Levante	95	(14)
2017–2018	Tenerife	29	(9)
2018–2019	Alcorcón	24	(2)
2019–2021	Andorra	46	(10)
2021–2022	Inter d'Escaldes	15	(4)
2022–2023	Atlètic d'Escaldes	26	(5)
Total		560	(124)

International career
2004	Spain U19	9	(5)
2005	Spain U20	3	(1)
- * Club domestic league appearances and goals

Víctor Manuel Casadesús Castaño (born 28 February 1985) is a Spanish former professional footballer who played as a forward.

He spent the better part of his 20-year senior career with Mallorca, making 237 competitive appearances and scoring 46 goals. He finished it in Andorra.

Casadesús won the 2004 European Under-19 Championship with Spain.

== Club career ==
Casadesús was born in Algaida, Mallorca. A product of hometown RCD Mallorca's youth ranks, he first appeared officially with the first team on 17 April 2005 in a 0–0 La Liga home draw against Valencia CF, and established himself as a useful attacking player in the following seasons.

In the second half of 2007–08 campaign, Casadesús served a six-month loan at Segunda División club Real Sociedad, scoring regularly during his stint but not being able to help the Basques ultimately promote to the top flight. He returned subsequently to the Balearic Islands but, in August 2008 was again loaned, to Gimnàstic de Tarragona also in the second tier, being again recalled after netting a career-high 13 goals.

In 2009–10, Casadesús found himself backing up in-form Aritz Aduriz, and appeared more prominently in the Copa del Rey. On 14 January 2010, he helped the team come from behind against Rayo Vallecano with a brace for an eventual 3–1 home win (4–3 aggregate), but had to be stretchered off with a broken clavicle. In the league, the side finished fifth – fourth until the last minute of the last matchday – and qualified for the UEFA Europa League, with the player contributing four goals.

Casadesús alternated between divisions one and two after leaving Mallorca in January 2014, with Levante UD, CD Tenerife and AD Alcorcón. The 34-year-old moved down to the Segunda División B in summer 2019, signing for FC Andorra.

== International career ==
Casadesús appeared for Spain at the 2004 UEFA European Under-19 Championship, scoring for the eventual champions in the 2–2 semi-final draw with Ukraine (penalty shootout victory after 120 minutes).

== Honours ==
Levante

- Segunda División: 2016–17

Spain U19

- UEFA European Under-19 Championship: 2004
