= Pedro López (footballer, born November 1983) =

Spanish footballer

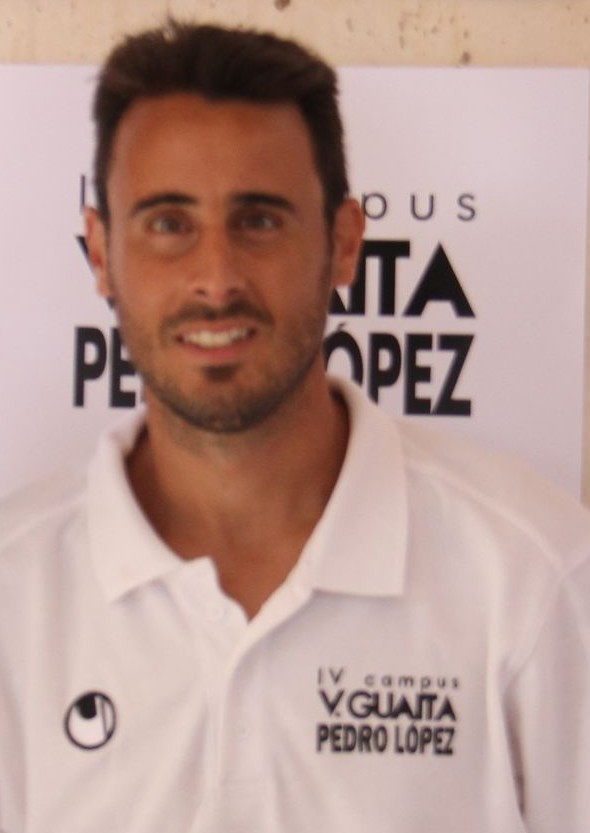
- López in 2014

Personal information
- Full name: Pedro López Muñoz
- Date of birth: 1 November 1983 (age 43)
- Place of birth: Torrent, Spain
- Height: 1.78 m (5 ft 10 in)
- Position: Right-back

Youth career
- 1996–2002: Monte-Sión

Senior career*
Years	Team	Apps	(Gls)
2002–2004	Valencia B	54	(6)
2004–2005	Valencia	0	(0)
2004–2005	→ Racing Santander (loan)	20	(1)
2005–2011	Valladolid	168	(3)
2011–2019	Levante	160	(2)
2019–2021	Huesca	40	(0)
Total		442	(12)
- * Club domestic league appearances and goals

Pedro López Muñoz (born 1 November 1983) is a Spanish former professional footballer who played as a right-back.

Over 12 seasons, he amassed La Liga totals of 257 matches and five goals, in representation of Racing de Santander, Valladolid, Levante and Huesca.

== Club career ==
=== Valencia and Racing ===
Born in Torrent, Valencian Community, López was a product of Valencia CF's youth system. His input with the first team consisted of three appearances in the 2005 UEFA Intertoto Cup, as he was mainly associated to their reserves.

López would go on to make his La Liga debut for Racing de Santander during the 2004–05 season, having signed on loan.

=== Valladolid ===
López joined Real Valladolid in summer 2005, playing 36 matches for a side that achieved top-flight promotion two years later. He scored his first goal for the club the following campaign, a long-range strike during the 1–1 home draw against Real Madrid on 23 September 2007.

On 14 December 2008, firmly established as first-choice right-back, López netted from his half in a 3–0 home win over Deportivo de La Coruña. He continued to start regularly in the next seasons, suffering relegation in 2009–10.

=== Levante ===
Wishing to return to the top tier, López joined Levante UD of his native region on 19 July 2011, on a three-year deal. The team finished a best-ever sixth in his debut season, subsequently qualifying for the UEFA Europa League in which he played eight matches to help them reach the quarter-finals. He scored his first goal for the club on 31 March 2014, to confirm a 2–0 win at Granada CF.

On 16 May 2019, the 35-year-old López announced he would leave the Estadi Ciutat de València at the end of the campaign when his contract expired.

=== Huesca ===
On 16 July 2019, free agent López signed a one-year contract with SD Huesca, recently relegated to Segunda División.

== Honours ==
Valladolid

- Segunda División: 2006–07

Levante

- Segunda División: 2016–17

Huesca

- Segunda División: 2019–20
