= 2019–20 Levante UD season =

Levante
2019–20 season
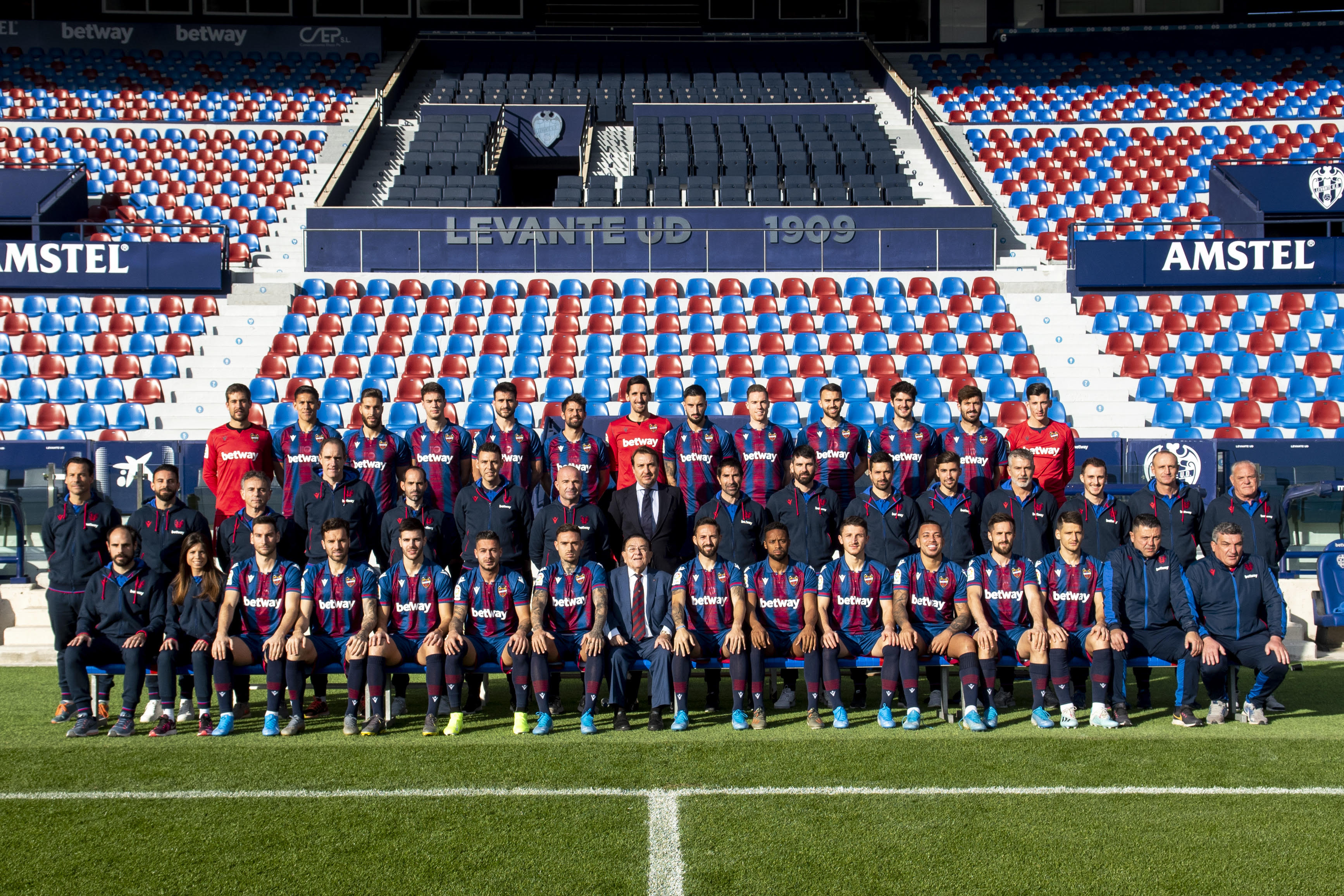
- President: Quico Catalán
- Head coach: Paco López
- Stadium: Estadi Ciutat de València and Camilo Cano (from 15 June 2020)
- La Liga: 12th
- Copa del Rey: Round of 32
- Top goalscorer: League: Roger (11); All: Roger (11)
- Highest home attendance: 23,566 (vs Real Madrid, 22 February 2020)
- Lowest home attendance: 14,886 (vs Mallorca, 22 November 2019)
- Average home league attendance: 19,196
- Biggest win: Melilla CD 0–5 Levante
- Biggest defeat: Getafe 4–0 Levante
Home colours	Away colours	Third colours

The 2019–20 season was Levante Unión Deportiva's 81st season in existence and the club's 3rd consecutive season in the top flight of Spanish football. In addition to the domestic league, Levante participated in this season's edition of the Copa del Rey. The season was slated to cover a period from 1 July 2019 to 30 June 2020. It was extended extraordinarily beyond 30 June due to the COVID-19 pandemic in Spain.

== Players ==
=== Current squad ===
As of 1 February 2020

Note: Flags indicate national team as defined under FIFA eligibility rules; some limited exceptions apply. Players may hold more than one non-FIFA nationality.

No.	Pos.	Nation	Player
1	GK	ESP	Koke Vegas
2	DF	ESP	Iván López
3	DF	ESP	Toño
4	DF	ESP	Róber
5	MF	SRB	Nemanja Radoja
6	DF	CRC	Óscar Duarte
7	FW	ESP	Sergio León
8	FW	POR	Hernâni
9	FW	ESP	Roger
10	MF	MKD	Enis Bardhi
11	FW	ESP	José Luis Morales (captain)
13	GK	ESP	Aitor Fernández

No.	Pos.	Nation	Player
14	DF	POR	Rúben Vezo
15	DF	ESP	Sergio Postigo (Vice-captain)
16	MF	ESP	Rubén Rochina
17	MF	MNE	Nikola Vukčević
18	DF	ESP	Bruno
19	DF	ESP	Carlos Clerc
20	DF	ESP	Jorge Miramón
21	FW	ESP	Borja Mayoral (on loan from Real Madrid)
22	MF	ESP	Gonzalo Melero
23	DF	ESP	Coke
24	MF	ESP	José Campaña

=== Reserve team ===
Note: Flags indicate national team as defined under FIFA eligibility rules; some limited exceptions apply. Players may hold more than one non-FIFA nationality.

No.	Pos.	Nation	Player
26	GK	ESP	Dani Cárdenas
29	DF	ESP	Gonzalo Pereira
36	MF	ESP	Pablo Martínez

No.	Pos.	Nation	Player
40	DF	ESP	Eliseo
43	MF	GEO	Giorgi Kochorashvili

=== Out on loan ===
Note: Flags indicate national team as defined under FIFA eligibility rules; some limited exceptions apply. Players may hold more than one non-FIFA nationality.

No.	Pos.	Nation	Player
—	DF	ESP	Antonio Luna (at Rayo Vallecano until 30 June 2020)
—	MF	CIV	Cheick Doukouré (at Huesca until 30 June 2020)
—	MF	ESP	Fran Manzanara (at Ponferradina until 30 June 2020)
—	MF	ESP	Pepelu (at Tondela until 30 June 2020)

No.	Pos.	Nation	Player
—	FW	GHA	Raphael Dwamena (at Zaragoza until 30 June 2020)
—	FW	ESP	Ivi (at Ponferradina until 30 June 2020)
—	FW	ALB	Armando Sadiku (at Málaga until 30 June 2020)

== Transfers ==
=== In ===
Date	Player	From	Type	Fee	Ref
30 June 2019	(Spain) Ivi	Sporting Gijón	Loan return		
30 June 2019	(Spain) Iván López	Gimnàstic	Loan return		
30 June 2019	(Bosnia and Herzegovina) Sanjin Prcić	(France) Strasbourg	Loan return		
30 June 2019	(Albania) Armando Sadiku	(Switzerland) Lugano	Loan return		
30 June 2019	(Montenegro) Esteban Saveljich	Almería	Loan return		
1 July 2019	(Spain) Carlos Clerc	Osasuna	Transfer	Free	
1 July 2019	(Spain) Sergio León	Real Betis	Transfer	€4M	
1 July 2019	(Spain) Jorge Miramón	Huesca	Transfer	Free	
1 July 2019	(Portugal) Rúben Vezo	Valencia	Buyout clause	€5M	
2 July 2019	(Portugal) Hernâni	(Portugal) Porto	Transfer	Free	
3 July 2019	(Spain) Gonzalo Melero	Huesca	Transfer	€3.6M	
1 August 2019	(Costa Rica) Óscar Duarte	Espanyol	Transfer	Free	
21 August 2019	(Serbia) Nemanja Radoja	Celta Vigo	Transfer	Free	
2 September 2019	(Spain) Róber Pier	Deportivo La Coruña	Transfer	Undisclosed	

▼ Total Spending: €12.6M

=== Out ===
Date	Player	To	Type	Fee	Ref
30 June 2019	(Spain) Róber Pier	Deportivo La Coruña	Loan return		
1 July 2019	(Spain) Jason	Valencia	Transfer	Free	
16 July 2019	(Spain) Pedro López	Huesca	Transfer	Free	
17 July 2019	(Ghana) Raphael Dwamena	Zaragoza	Loan		
17 July 2019	(Spain) Koke Vegas	Deportivo La Coruña	Loan		
27 July 2019	(Montenegro) Esteban Saveljich	Rayo Vallecano	Transfer	€300K	
8 August 2019	(Spain) Chema	(England) Nottingham Forest	Transfer	Undisclosed	
13 August 2019	(Spain) Ivi	Huesca	Loan		
15 August 2019	(Nigeria) Moses Simon	(France) Nantes	Loan		
29 August 2019	(Spain) Antonio Luna	Rayo Vallecano	Loan		
1 September 2019	(Spain) Fran Manzanara	Ponferradina	Loan		
2 September 2019	(Ivory Coast) Cheick Doukouré	Huesca	Loan		
2 September 2019	(Bosnia and Herzegovina) Sanjin Prcić	(France) Strasbourg	Transfer	Free	
2 September 2019	(Albania) Armando Sadiku	Málaga	Loan		

== Pre-season and friendlies ==
Win Draw Loss

1 August 2019 Friendly	Levante	1–1	Huesca	Teruel, Spain
20:00 CEST (UTC+2)				Stadium: Estadio Pinilla

3 August 2019 Friendly	Brest	1–1	Levante	Brest, France
18:30 CEST (UTC+2)	Autret 13'	Report	León 19'	Stadium: Stade Francis-Le Blé; Referee: Mugmer Cyril

7 August 2019 Friendly	Elche	0–2	Levante	Alcoy, Spain
19:00 CEST (UTC+2)		Report	León 37'; Morales 72'	Stadium: Estadio El Collao; Referee: Saúl Ais Reig

10 August 2019 Friendly	Mallorca	1–2	Levante	Palma, Spain
21:00 CEST (UTC+2)	Budimir 5'	Report	León 50'; Mayoral 57'	Stadium: Estadi de Son Moix; Referee: Guillermo Cuadra Fernández

== Competitions ==
=== Overview ===
Competition	First match	Last match	Starting round	Final position	Record							
Competition	First match	Last match	Starting round	Final position	Pld	W	D	L	GF	GA	GD	Win %
La Liga	18 August 2019	19 July 2020	Matchday 1	12th	38	14	7	17	47	53	−6	36.84
Copa del Rey	19 December 2019	21 January 2020	First round	Round of 32	3	1	1	1	7	4	+3	33.33
Total					41	15	8	18	54	57	−3	36.59

Last updated: 19 July 2020
Source: Soccerway

=== La Liga ===
==== League table ====
Pos	Team	Pld	W	D	L	GF	GA	GD	Pts
10	Osasuna	38	13	13	12	46	54	−8	52
11	Athletic Bilbao	38	13	12	13	41	38	+3	51
12	Levante	38	14	7	17	47	53	−6	49
13	Valladolid	38	9	15	14	32	43	−11	42
14	Eibar	38	11	9	18	39	56	−17	42

Source: La Liga, Soccerway
Rules for classification: 1) Points; 2) Head-to-head points; 3) Head-to-head goal difference; 4) Goal difference; 5) Goals scored; 6) Fair-play points (Note: Head-to-head record is used only after all the matches between the teams in question have been played)

==== Results summary ====
Overall								Home						Away					
Pld	W	D	L	GF	GA	GD	Pts	W	D	L	GF	GA	GD	W	D	L	GF	GA	GD
38	14	7	17	47	53	−6	49	9	5	5	27	19	+8	5	2	12	20	34	−14

Last updated: 19 July 2020.
Source: La Liga

==== Results by round ====
Round	1	2	3	4	5	6	7	8	9	10	11	12	13	14	15	16	17	18	19	20	21	22	23	24	25	26	27	28	29	30	31	32	33	34	35	36	37	38
Ground	A	H	H	A	H	A	H	A	A	H	A	H	A	H	A	H	A	H	A	H	A	A	H	A	H	A	H	A	H	A	H	H	A	H	A	H	A	H
Result	L	W	W	L	D	L	D	W	L	L	W	W	L	W	L	L	W	W	L	L	L	L	W	L	W	L	D	D	D	W	L	W	D	D	L	L	W	W
Position	18	10	4	8	9	11	12	10	11	13	11	11	12	9	11	12	11	9	11	12	13	13	11	13	10	11	13	12	13	11	12	12	12	12	12	12	12	12

Updated to match(es) played on 19 July 2020. Source: La Liga
A = Away; H = Home; W = Win; D = Draw; L = Loss

==== Matches ====
The La Liga schedule was announced on 4 July 2019.

18 August 2019 1	Alavés	1–0	Levante	Vitoria-Gasteiz
17:00 CEST (UTC+2)	Joselu (yellow card) 37', (goal) 54'; García (yellow card) 65'	Report	Melero (yellow card) 45'	Stadium: Mendizorrotza Stadium; Attendance: 10,053; Referee: César Soto Grado

23 August 2019 2	Levante	2–1	Villarreal	Valencia
22:00 CEST (UTC+2)	Roger 68' (pen.), 73' (pen.); Vukčević (yellow card) 80'	Report	Gerard 3'; Fernández (yellow card) 67'; Albiol (yellow card) 70'	Stadium: Estadi Ciutat de València; Attendance: 18,914; Referee: José Luis Munuera Montero

31 August 2019 3	Levante	2–0	Valladolid	Valencia
19:00 CEST (UTC+2)	Postigo (yellow card) 69'; Vukčević (yellow card) 75'; León 83'; Morales 90+3'	Report	Míchel (yellow card) 63'; Guardiola (yellow card) 75'	Stadium: Estadi Ciutat de València; Attendance: 18,504; Referee: Adrián Cordero Vega

14 September 2019 4	Real Madrid	3–2	Levante	Madrid
13:00 CEST (UTC+2)	Benzema 25', 31'; Casemiro (yellow card) 28', (goal) 40'; Vázquez (yellow card) 40'	Report	Mayoral 49'; Melero 75'; Vezo (yellow card) 80'; Clerc (yellow card) 90'	Stadium: Santiago Bernabéu; Attendance: 60,726; Referee: Ricardo de Burgos Bengoetxea

21 September 2019 5	Levante	0–0	Eibar	Valencia
16:00 CEST (UTC+2)		Report	León (yellow card) 36'; Dmitrović (yellow card) 81'	Stadium: Estadi Ciutat de València; Attendance: 18,000; Referee: Javier Alberola Rojas

24 September 2019 6	Real Betis	3–1	Levante	Seville
20:00 CEST (UTC+2)	Loren (yellow card) 25', (goal) 45+3', 48'; Carvalho (yellow card) 63'; Iglesias 67'	Report	Hernâni 7'; Vukčević (yellow card) 29'; Coke (yellow card) 57'	Stadium: Estadio Benito Villamarín; Attendance: 42,995; Referee: Eduardo Prieto Iglesias

29 September 2019 7	Levante	1–1	Osasuna	Valencia
18:30 CEST (UTC+2)	Hernâni 4', (yellow card) 18' (yellow-red card) 72'; Roger (yellow card) 61'; Radoja (yellow card) 82'; Fernández (yellow card) 84'; León (yellow card) 90'	Report	R. García 57'	Stadium: Estadi Ciutat de València; Attendance: 19,362; Referee: César Soto Grado

5 October 2019 8	Leganés	1–2	Levante	Leganés
13:00 CEST (UTC+2)	Recio (yellow card) 36'; Óscar (yellow card) 45+1'; Silva (yellow card) 56'; Braithwaite 76'	Report	Vukčević (yellow card) 1'; Miramón (yellow card) 34'; León (yellow card) 45+1'; Roger 45+2' (pen.), (yellow card) 54'; Campaña 49'; Vezo (yellow card) 79'	Stadium: Butarque; Attendance: 10,160; Referee: José Luis Munuera Montero

20 October 2019 9	Sevilla	1–0	Levante	Seville
21:00 CEST (UTC+2)	Fernando (yellow card) 58'; Koundé (yellow card) 77'; De Jong 86'	Report	Cabaco (yellow card) 14'; Vezo (yellow card) 90+3'	Stadium: Ramón Sánchez Pizjuán Stadium; Attendance: 34,612; Referee: Guillermo Cuadra Fernández

27 October 2019 10	Levante	0–1	Espanyol	Valencia
16:00 CET (UTC+1)	Clerc (yellow card) 78'; Miramón (yellow card) 90+1'	Report	Espinosa 38'; Naldo (yellow card) 42'; Víctor (yellow card) 65'; Campuzano (yellow card) 90+4'	Stadium: Estadi Ciutat de València; Attendance: 18,934; Referee: Pablo González Fuertes

30 October 2019 11	Real Sociedad	1–2	Levante	San Sebastián
19:00 CET (UTC+1)	Willian José 48', (yellow card) 56'; Zaldúa (yellow card) 90+6'; Portu (yellow card) 90+6'	Report	Bardhi 24'; Melero (yellow card) 37'; Mayoral 40'; Clerc (yellow card) 42'; Postigo (yellow card) 89'; Fernández (yellow card) 90+3'	Stadium: Anoeta; Attendance: 28,142; Referee: Mario Melero López

2 November 2019 12	Levante	3–1	Barcelona	Valencia
16:00 CET (UTC+1)	Bardhi (yellow card) 52'; Campaña 61'; Mayoral 63'; Radoja 68'	Report	Arthur (yellow card) 12'; Messi 38' (pen.); Griezmann (yellow card) 56'; Piqué (yellow card) 66'; Lenglet (yellow card) 67'; S. Roberto (yellow card) 81'; Ansu Fati (yellow card) 86'	Stadium: Estadi Ciutat de València; Attendance: 23,387; Referee: Alejandro Hernández Hernández

10 November 2019 13	Athletic Bilbao	2–1	Levante	Bilbao
14:00 CET (UTC+1)	Muniain 57'; D. García (yellow card) 62'; R. García (yellow card) 62'; Capa (yellow card) 78', (goal) 88'	Report	Postigo 45+1'; Bardhi (yellow card) 49'; Vezo (yellow card) 75'	Stadium: San Mamés; Attendance: 33,202; Referee: Javier Alberola Rojas

22 November 2019 14	Levante	2–1	Mallorca	Valencia
21:00 CET (UTC+1)	Roger 52'; Campaña (yellow card) 60' (yellow-red card) 86'; Rochina 73'	Report	Budimir (yellow card) 56'; Rodríguez 65'	Stadium: Estadi Ciutat de València; Attendance: 15,110; Referee: Valentín Pizarro Gómez

1 December 2019 15	Getafe	4–0	Levante	Getafe
18:30 CET (UTC+1)	Timor (yellow card) 40', (goal) 78'; Jason (yellow card) 48'; Cabrera 54'; Molina 60' (pen.); Ángel 67'	Report	Rochina (yellow card) 39'; Clerc (yellow card) 52'; Radoja (yellow card) 77'	Stadium: Coliseum Alfonso Pérez; Attendance: 6,535; Referee: Xavier Estrada Fernández

7 December 2019 16	Levante	2–4	Valencia	Valencia
18:30 CET (UTC+1)	Coke (yellow card) 7'; Morales (yellow card) 9'; Roger 11', 20' (pen.); Rochina (yellow card) 24'; Eliseo (yellow card) 44' (yellow-red card) 75'	Report	Coquelin (yellow card) 31'; Roger 45+3' (o.g.); Gameiro 57', 59'; Torres (yellow card) 86', (goal) 88'	Stadium: Estadi Ciutat de València; Attendance: 22,265; Referee: David Medié Jiménez

14 December 2019 17	Granada	1–2	Levante	Granada
13:00 CET (UTC+1)	Gonalons (yellow card) 11'; Neva (yellow card) 52'; Machís 60'; Eteki (yellow card) 90+1'; Fernández (yellow card) 90+1'	Report	Postigo (yellow card) 2'; Rochina 55'; Bardhi (yellow card) 59', (goal) 90'; Cabaco (yellow card) 90+1'	Stadium: Nuevo Estadio de Los Cármenes; Attendance: 14,127; Referee: Carlos del Cerro Grande

22 December 2019 18	Levante	3–1	Celta Vigo	Valencia
18:30 CET (UTC+1)	Roger (yellow card) 21', (goal) 60', 70'; Bardhi (yellow card) 47'; Mayoral 90+1', (yellow card) 90+2'	Report	Aspas 12', (yellow card) 72'; Yokuşlu (yellow card) 18'; Mina (yellow card) 26'; Aidoo (yellow card) 65'; Méndez (yellow card) 71'; Araujo (yellow card) 72'	Stadium: Estadi Ciutat de València; Attendance: 18,653; Referee: Eduardo Prieto Iglesias

4 January 2020 19	Atlético Madrid	2–1	Levante	Madrid
18:30 CET (UTC+1)	Correa 13'; Felipe 18'; Thomas (yellow card) 27'	Report	Roger 16'; Rochina (yellow card) 43'; Cabaco (yellow card) 52'; Vukčević (yellow card) 90+1'	Stadium: Wanda Metropolitano; Attendance: 59,084; Referee: Ricardo de Burgos Bengoetxea

18 January 2020 20	Levante	0–1	Alavés	Valencia
13:00 CET (UTC+1)	Melero (yellow card) 42'; Cabaco (yellow card) 87'	Report	Ely (yellow card) 39'; Vidal 64'; Navarro (yellow card) 67'; Duarte (yellow card) 70'; Camarasa (yellow card) 89'	Stadium: Estadi Ciutat de València; Attendance: 16,766; Referee: Guillermo Cuadra Fernández

24 January 2020 21	Osasuna	2–0	Levante	Pamplona
21:00 CET (UTC+1)	D. García (yellow card) 53'; Rober (yellow card) 63'; Brašanac (yellow card) 75'; R. García 81' (pen.); Pérez 84'	Report	Campaña (yellow card) 80'; Vukčević (yellow card) 88'; Rochina (yellow card) 90+2'	Stadium: El Sadar; Attendance: 14,667; Referee: César Soto Grado

2 February 2020 22	Barcelona	2–1	Levante	Barcelona
21:00 CET (UTC+1)	Fati 30', 31'; Piqué (yellow card) 65'; Alba (yellow card) 65'	Report	Rochina 90+2'	Stadium: Camp Nou; Attendance: 60,295; Referee: Adrián Cordero Vega

8 February 2020 23	Levante	2–0	Leganés	Valencia
13:00 CET (UTC+1)	Rochina 20'; Roger 28'; Vukčević (yellow card) 33'; Mayoral (yellow card) 55'	Report	Omeruo (yellow card) 23'; Bustinza (yellow card) 42'; Rodrigues (yellow card) 49'	Stadium: Estadi Ciutat de València; Attendance: 17,110; Referee: José Luis González González

15 February 2020 24	Villarreal	2–1	Levante	Villarreal
18:30 CET (UTC+1)	Gerard 9'; Iborra (yellow card) 22'; Trigueros (yellow card) 53'; Gómez 61'; Peña (yellow card) 69'	Report	Mayoral 56'; Postigo (yellow card) 90'	Stadium: Estadio de la Cerámica; Attendance: 17,269; Referee: Mario Melero López

22 February 2020 25	Levante	1–0	Real Madrid	Valencia
21:00 CET (UTC+1)	Roger (yellow card) 35'; Morales 79'	Report	Ramos (yellow card) 10'; Casemiro (yellow card) 71'	Stadium: Estadi Ciutat de València; Attendance: 23,566; Referee: Alejandro Hernández Hernández

29 February 2020 26	Eibar	3–0	Levante	Eibar
13:00 CET (UTC+1)	Charles 27', 48'; Enrich (yellow card) 51'; Orellana (yellow card) 60', (goal) 84'; Cote (yellow card) 62'	Report	Miramón (yellow card) 71'; Postigo (yellow card) 72'	Stadium: Ipurua Municipal Stadium; Attendance: 5,920; Referee: Pablo González Fuertes

8 March 2020 27	Levante	1–1	Granada	Valencia
16:00 CET (UTC+1)	Roger 11'; Morales (yellow card) 45+3'; Vukčević (yellow card) 69'; Campaña (yellow card) 90+3'	Report	Puertas (yellow card) 49'; Machís 60'; Duarte (yellow card) 82'; Eteki (yellow card) 90+1'	Stadium: Estadi Ciutat de València; Attendance: 16,168; Referee: Eduardo Prieto Iglesias

12 June 2020 28	Valencia	1–1	Levante	Valencia
22:00 CEST (UTC+2)	Guillamón (yellow card) 43'; Rodrigo 90'	Report	Roger (yellow card) 45+2' (yellow-red card) 74'; Miramón (yellow card) 54'; Vukčević (yellow card) 72'; Melero 90+8' (pen.)	Stadium: Mestalla; Attendance: 0 Referee: Javier Alberola Rojas
Note: The match was originally scheduled for 14 March, but was postponed due to the COVID-19 pandemic. and rescheduled to 12 June. It was played behind closed doors.

15 June 2020 29	Levante	1–1	Sevilla	La Nucia
19:30 CEST (UTC+2)	Rochina (yellow card) 52'; Diego Carlos 87' (o.g.)	Report	De Jong 46'; Jordán (yellow card) 60'	Stadium: Camilo Cano (Note: Due to on-going renovations of the Estadi Ciutat de València, Levante played their remaining home matches of the season at the Estadi Olímpic Camilo Cano.); Attendance: 0 Referee: Alejandro Hernández Hernández
Note: The match was originally scheduled for 22 March, but was postponed due to the 2020 coronavirus pandemic, and rescheduled to 15 June. It was played behind closed doors.

20 June 2020 30	Espanyol	1–3	Levante	Cornellà de Llobregat
14:00 CEST (UTC+2)	Cabrera (yellow card) 16'; Da. López 28'; Vilà (yellow card) 37'	Report	Mayoral 14'; Bardhi 67'; Pedrosa 87' (o.g.)	Stadium: RCDE Stadium; Attendance: 0 Referee: Carlos del Cerro Grande
Note: The match was originally scheduled for 5 April, but was postponed due to the 2020 coronavirus pandemic, and rescheduled to 20 June. It was played behind closed doors.

23 June 2020 31	Levante	0–1	Atlético Madrid	La Nucia
19:30 CEST (UTC+2)	Coke (yellow card) 27'; Vukčević (yellow card) 50'; Morales (yellow card) 81'; Toño (yellow card) 90+2'	Report	Bruno 15' (o.g.); Saúl (yellow card) 69'; Morata (yellow card) 90+2'	Stadium: Camilo Cano; Attendance: 0 Referee: José Luis Munuera Montero
Note: The match was originally scheduled for 12 April, but was postponed due to the 2020 coronavirus pandemic, and rescheduled to 23 June. It was played behind closed doors.

28 June 2020 32	Levante	4–2	Real Betis	La Nucia
14:00 CEST (UTC+2)	Mayoral 21'; Bardhi 35'; Morales 50'; Rochina 59'	Report	Feddal (yellow card) 40'; Barragán (yellow card) 45+2'; Canales 70'; Carvalho (yellow card) 84'; Juanmi 87'; Iglesias (yellow card) 90'	Stadium: Camilo Cano; Attendance: 0 Referee: Santiago Jaime Latre
Note: The match was originally scheduled for 22 April, but was postponed due to the 2020 coronavirus pandemic, and rescheduled to 28 June. It was played behind closed doors.

1 July 2020 33	Valladolid	0–0	Levante	Valladolid
22:00 CEST (UTC+2)	Rubio (yellow card) 29'; Míchel (yellow card) 45+3'	Report	Bardhi (yellow card) 16'	Stadium: Estadio José Zorrilla; Attendance: 0 Referee: David Medié Jiménez
Note: The match was originally scheduled for 26 April, but was postponed due to the 2020 coronavirus pandemic, and rescheduled to 1 July. It was played behind closed doors.

6 July 2020 34	Levante	1–1	Real Sociedad	La Nucia
19:30 CEST (UTC+2)	Morales 16'; Vukčević (yellow card) 67'; Postigo (yellow card) 90'	Report	Isak 12'; Zubimendi (yellow card) 14'; Elustondo (yellow card) 63'	Stadium: Camilo Cano; Attendance: 0 Referee: Valentín Pizarro Gómez
Note: The match was originally scheduled for 3 May, but was postponed due to the 2020 coronavirus pandemic, and rescheduled to 6 July. It was played behind closed doors.

9 July 2020 35	Mallorca	2–0	Levante	Palma
19:30 CEST (UTC+2)	Rodríguez (yellow card) 21'; Hernández 40'; Raíllo (yellow card) 51'; Kubo (yellow card) 61', (goal) 84'	Report	Hernâni (yellow card) 90'	Stadium: Son Moix; Attendance: 0 Referee: César Soto Grado
Note: The match was originally scheduled for 10 May, but was postponed due to the 2020 coronavirus pandemic, and rescheduled to 9 July. It was played behind closed doors.

12 July 2020 36	Levante	1–2	Athletic Bilbao	La Nucia
17:00 CEST (UTC+2)	Bardhi 71'	Report	R. García 4', 45+1'; Martínez (yellow card) 17'	Stadium: Camilo Cano; Attendance: 0 Referee: Javier Alberola Rojas
Note: The match was originally scheduled for 13 May, but was postponed due to the 2020 coronavirus pandemic, and rescheduled to 12 July. It was played behind closed doors.

16 July 2020 37	Celta Vigo	2–3	Levante	Vigo
21:00 CEST (UTC+2)	Mina 36'; Rafinha (yellow card) 42'; Aspas 45+1'; Nolito (yellow card) 84' (yellow-red card) 90+4'	Report	Bardhi 11', 28'; Mayoral 52'; Miramón (red card) 59'	Stadium: Abanca-Balaídos; Attendance: 0 Referee: José Luis Munuera Montero
Note: The match was originally scheduled for 17 May, but was postponed due to the 2020 coronavirus pandemic, and rescheduled to 16 July. It was played behind closed doors.

19 July 2020 38	Levante	1–0	Getafe	La Nucia
21:00 CEST (UTC+2)	Toño (yellow card) 29'; Radoja (yellow card) 51'; Coke 90+9'	Report	Ángel (yellow card) 13'; Timor (yellow card) 87'; Olivera (yellow card) 90+4'; Suárez (yellow card) 90+4'	Stadium: Camilo Cano; Attendance: 0 Referee: Ricardo de Burgos Bengoetxea
Note: The match was originally scheduled for 24 May, but was postponed due to the 2020 coronavirus pandemic, and rescheduled to 19 July. It was played behind closed doors.

=== Copa del Rey ===
19 December 2019 First round	Melilla CD	0–5	Levante	Melilla (Note: Melilla CD played at Álvarez Claro instead of their regular stadium La Espiguera, also in Melilla, after mutual agreement between both clubs and official approval from the Royal Spanish Football Federation.)
19:00 CET (UTC+1)	Mohamed (yellow card) 8'	Report	Coke 9', 12'; Mayoral 20'; Hernâni 55'; León 84'	Stadium: Álvarez Claro; Attendance: 3,000; Referee: Javier Alberola Rojas

12 January 2020 Second round	Jaén	1–1 (a.e.t.) (4–5 p)	Levante	Jaén
16:00 CET (UTC+1)	Lucero (yellow card) 12'; Cortés (yellow card) 51'; Martín 82'; Ruiz (yellow card) 119'	Report	Vukčević (yellow card) 11' (yellow-red card) 44'; León 32'; Cabaco (yellow card) 42' (yellow-red card) 112'; Campaña (yellow card) 43'; Melero (yellow card) 90+1'	Stadium: Nuevo Estadio de La Victoria; Attendance: 4,000; Referee: Alejandro Hernández Hernández
	Penalties
	Ocaña (penalty scored); Castillo (penalty scored); Ruiz (penalty scored); Marcelo (penalty scored); González (penalty missed)		(penalty scored) Campaña; (penalty scored) Martí; (penalty scored) Morales; (penalty scored) Bardhi; (penalty scored) Coke

21 January 2020 Round of 32	Sevilla	3–1	Levante	Seville
21:00 CET (UTC+1)	Fernando 13', (yellow card) 38'; Ocampos 46'; Nolito (yellow card) 61'; Banega (yellow card) 71'; Óliver 78'; Gómez (yellow card) 81'	Report	Duarte 31'; Rochina (yellow card) 32'	Stadium: Ramón Sánchez Pizjuán; Attendance: 28,104; Referee: José María Sánchez Martínez

== Statistics ==
=== Appearances and goals ===
Last updated on the end of the season.

No.	Pos	Nat	Player	Total		La Liga		Copa del Rey	
No.	Pos	Nat	Player	Apps	Goals	Apps	Goals	Apps	Goals
Goalkeepers
1	GK	(Spain) ESP	Koke Vegas	2	0	2	0	0	0
13	GK	(Spain) ESP	Aitor Fernández	38	0	36	0	1+1	0
Defenders
2	DF	(Spain) ESP	Iván López	0	0	0	0	0	0
3	DF	(Spain) ESP	Toño	21	0	18+2	0	1	0
4	DF	(Spain) ESP	Róber	4	0	2+2	0	0	0
6	DF	(Costa Rica) CRC	Óscar Duarte	9	1	5+3	0	1	1
14	DF	(Portugal) POR	Rúben Vezo	30	1	29	1	1	0
15	DF	(Spain) ESP	Sergio Postigo	28	1	27+1	1	0	0
19	DF	(Spain) ESP	Carlos Clerc	26	0	20+3	0	2+1	0
20	DF	(Spain) ESP	Jorge Miramón	32	1	27+5	1	0	0
23	DF	(Spain) ESP	Coke	20	3	11+6	1	3	2
29	DF	(Spain) ESP	Gonzalo	2	0	0+1	0	1	0
40	DF	(Spain) ESP	Eliseo	3	0	1	0	2	0
Midfielders
5	MF	(Serbia) SRB	Nemanja Radoja	27	1	22+4	1	1	0
10	MF	(North Macedonia) MKD	Enis Bardhi	32	7	23+7	7	0+2	0
11	MF	(Spain) ESP	José Luis Morales	41	4	29+9	4	3	0
16	MF	(Spain) ESP	Rubén Rochina	29	4	22+6	4	1	0
17	MF	(Montenegro) MNE	Nikola Vukčević	32	0	20+10	0	2	0
22	MF	(Spain) ESP	Gonzalo Melero	27	2	14+11	2	1+1	0
24	MF	(Spain) ESP	José Campaña	40	2	35+2	2	2+1	0
31	MF	(Spain) ESP	Joan Monterde	1	0	0+1	0	0	0
36	MF	(Spain) ESP	Pablo Martínez	7	0	0+5	0	1+1	0
42	MF	(Spain) ESP	Álex Blesa	1	0	0+1	0	0	0
43	MF	(Georgia (country)) GEO	Giorgi Kochorashvili	1	0	0+1	0	0	0
Forwards
7	FW	(Spain) ESP	Sergio León	25	3	6+16	1	3	2
8	FW	(Portugal) POR	Hernâni Fortes	23	3	5+15	2	3	1
9	FW	(Spain) ESP	Roger	38	11	26+10	11	0+2	0
21	FW	(Spain) ESP	Borja Mayoral	36	9	24+10	8	1+1	1
Players who have made an appearance or had a squad number this season but have left the club
1	GK	(Spain) ESP	Oier Olazábal	2	0	0	0	2	0
18	DF	(Spain) ESP	Bruno González	6	0	5+1	0	0	0
18	DF	(Uruguay) URU	Erick Cabaco	12	0	9+2	0	1	0
