= 2018–19 Levante UD season =

Levante UD
2018–19 season
- President: Quico Catalán
- Head coach: Paco López
- Stadium: Ciutat de València
- La Liga: 15th
- Copa del Rey: Round of 16
- Top goalscorer: League: José Luis Morales; Roger (12 each); All: José Luis Morales; Roger (12 each)
- Highest home attendance: 23,736
- Lowest home attendance: 16,198
- Average home league attendance: 19,667
Home colours	Away colours	Third colours

During the 2018–19 season, Levante UD participated in La Liga and Copa del Rey.

== Players ==
=== Current squad ===
As of 31 August 2018

Note: Flags indicate national team as defined under FIFA eligibility rules; some limited exceptions apply. Players may hold more than one non-FIFA nationality.

No.	Pos.	Nation	Player
1	GK	ESP	Koke Vegas
2	FW	ESP	Borja Mayoral (on loan from Real Madrid)
3	DF	ESP	Toño
4	DF	ESP	Róber (on loan from Deportivo La Coruña)
5	MF	CIV	Cheick Doukouré
6	DF	ESP	Chema
7	FW	NGR	Moses Simon
8	MF	BIH	Sanjin Prcić
9	FW	ESP	Roger
10	MF	MKD	Enis Bardhi
11	MF	ESP	José Luis Morales (vice-captain)
12	DF	ESP	Coke (3rd captain)
13	GK	ESP	Oier

No.	Pos.	Nation	Player
14	MF	ESP	Samu
15	DF	ESP	Sergio Postigo
16	FW	ESP	Rubén Rochina
17	MF	MNE	Nikola Vukčević
18	DF	URU	Erick Cabaco
19	DF	ESP	Pedro López (captain)
20	FW	GHA	Raphael Dwamena
21	FW	GHA	Emmanuel Boateng
22	DF	ESP	Antonio Luna
23	MF	ESP	Jason
24	MF	ESP	José Campaña
25	GK	ESP	Aitor Fernández
—	FW	ALB	Armando Sadiku

=== Out on loan ===
Note: Flags indicate national team as defined under FIFA eligibility rules; some limited exceptions apply. Players may hold more than one non-FIFA nationality.

No.	Pos.	Nation	Player
—	DF	MTN	Aly Abeid (at Alcorcón until 30 June 2019)
—	DF	ESP	Iván López (at Gimnàstic until 30 June 2019)
—	DF	MNE	Esteban Saveljich (at Almería until 30 June 2019)

No.	Pos.	Nation	Player
—	DF	USA	Shaq Moore (at Reus until 30 June 2019)
—	MF	CIV	Youssouf Yalike (at Torre Levante until 30 June 2019)
—	FW	ESP	Ivi (at Valladolid until 30 June 2019)

== Transfers ==
=== In ===
Date	Player	From	Type	Fee	Ref
16 May 2018	(Uruguay) Erick Cabaco	(Uruguay) Nacional	Transfer	€2,000,000	
28 June 2018	(Spain) Coke	(Germany) Schalke 04	Transfer	Undisclosed	
30 June 2018	(Spain) Javier Espinosa	(Spain) Granada	Loan return		
30 June 2018	(Spain) Rubén García	(Spain) Sporting Gijón	Loan return		
30 June 2018	(Spain) Samu	(Spain) Málaga	Loan return		
30 June 2018	(Montenegro) Esteban Saveljich	(Spain) Albacete	Loan return		
30 June 2018	(Spain) Verza	(Spain) Almería	Loan return		
4 July 2018	(Spain) Rubén Rochina	(Russia) Rubin Kazan	Transfer	Undisclosed	
7 July 2018	(Spain) Róber	(Spain) Deportivo La Coruña	Loan		
23 July 2018	(Spain) Aitor Fernández	(Spain) Numancia	Transfer	€1,000,000	
1 August 2018	(Bosnia and Herzegovina) Sanjin Prcić	(France) Rennes	Transfer	Free	
6 August 2018	(Nigeria) Moses Simon	(Belgium) Gent	Transfer	Undisclosed	
7 August 2018	(Ghana) Raphael Dwamena	(Switzerland) Zürich	Transfer	€6,000,000	
9 August 2018	(Montenegro) Nikola Vukčević	(Portugal) Braga	Transfer	€8,900,000	
31 August 2018	(Spain) Borja Mayoral	(Spain) Real Madrid	Loan		

=== Out ===
Date	Player	To	Type	Fee	Ref
16 May 2018	(Uruguay) Erick Cabaco	(Uruguay) Nacional	Loan return		
28 June 2018	(Spain) Coke	(Germany) Schalke 04	Loan return		
30 June 2018	(Saudi Arabia) Fahad Al-Muwallad	(Saudi Arabia) Al-Ittihad	Loan return		
30 June 2018	(Spain) Álex Alegría	(Spain) Betis	Loan return		
30 June 2018	(Serbia) Saša Lukić	(Italy) Torino	Loan return		
30 June 2018	(Italy) Giampaolo Pazzini	(Italy) Hellas Verona	Loan return		
30 June 2018	(Spain) Rubén Rochina	(Russia) Rubin Kazan	Loan return		
30 June 2018	(Spain) Iván Villar	(Spain) Celta Vigo	Loan return		
30 June 2018	(Spain) Róber	(Spain) Deportivo La Coruña	Loan return		
23 July 2018	(Spain) Raúl Fernández	(Spain) Las Palmas	Transfer	Free	
27 July 2018	(Spain) Ivi	(Spain) Valladolid	Loan		
7 August 2018	(Colombia) Jefferson Lerma	(England) AFC Bournemouth	Transfer	£25,200,000	
20 August 2018	(Spain) Rubén García	(Spain) Osasuna	Transfer	Free	
28 August 2018	(Spain) Iván López	(Spain) Gimnàstic	Loan		
31 August 2018	(Spain) Javier Espinosa	(Netherlands) Twente	Transfer	Free	
31 August 2018	(Montenegro) Esteban Saveljich	(Spain) Almería	Loan		
31 August 2018	(Spain) Verza	(Spain) Rayo Majadahonda	Transfer	Free	

== Competitions ==
=== Overall ===
Competition	First match	Last match	Starting round	Final position	Record							
Competition	First match	Last match	Starting round	Final position	Pld	W	D	L	GF	GA	GD	Win %
La Liga	17 August 2018	19 May 2019	Matchday 1	15th	38	11	11	16	59	66	−7	28.95
Copa del Rey	30 October 2018	17 January 2019	Round of 32	Round of 16	4	2	1	1	5	5	+0	50.00
Total					42	13	12	17	64	71	−7	30.95

Last updated: 18 May 2019
Source: Competitions

=== La Liga ===
==== League table ====
Pos	Team	Pld	W	D	L	GF	GA	GD	Pts
13	Leganés	38	11	12	15	37	43	−6	45
14	Villarreal	38	10	14	14	49	52	−3	44 (Note: Villarreal finished ahead of Levante on head-to-head points: Villarreal 1–1 Levante, Levante 0–2 Villarreal.)
15	Levante	38	11	11	16	59	66	−7	44
16	Valladolid	38	10	11	17	32	51	−19	41 (Note: Valladolid finished ahead of Celta Vigo on head-to-head points: Celta Vigo 3–3 Valladolid, Valladolid 2–1 Celta Vigo.)
17	Celta Vigo	38	10	11	17	53	62	−9	41

Source: La Liga, Soccerway
Rules for classification: 1) Points; 2) Head-to-head points; 3) Head-to-head goal difference; 4) Goal difference; 5) Goals scored; 6) Fair-play points (Note: Head-to-head record is used only after all the matches between the teams in question have been played)

==== Results summary ====
Overall								Home						Away					
Pld	W	D	L	GF	GA	GD	Pts	W	D	L	GF	GA	GD	W	D	L	GF	GA	GD
38	11	11	16	59	66	−7	44	6	7	6	34	34	0	5	4	10	25	32	−7

Last updated: 18 May 2019.
Source: Competitive matches

==== Results by round ====
Round	1	2	3	4	5	6	7	8	9	10	11	12	13	14	15	16	17	18	19	20	21	22	23	24	25	26	27	28	29	30	31	32	33	34	35	36	37	38
Ground	A	H	H	A	H	A	H	A	A	H	A	H	A	H	A	H	A	H	A	H	A	H	A	A	H	A	H	A	H	A	H	A	H	H	A	H	A	H
Result	W	L	D	L	L	L	W	W	W	W	D	L	D	W	D	L	L	D	L	W	L	D	L	W	L	L	L	D	D	L	D	L	D	W	L	W	W	D
Position	3	10	4	11	16	17	16	11	8	7	7	7	7	6	6	8	10	10	12	10	12	11	14	12	13	15	15	15	15	15	15	16	17	15	16	16	15	15

Updated to match(es) played on 18 May 2019. Source: Competitive matches
A = Away; H = Home; W = Win; D = Draw; L = Loss

==== Matches ====
Win Draw Loss Fixtures

17 August 2018 1	Real Betis	0–3	Levante	Seville
22:15 CEST (UTC+02:00)		Report	Roger 38'; Morales 54', 90+5', (yellow card) 90+3'; Luna (yellow card) 82'	Stadium: Benito Villamarín; Attendance: 45,337; Referee: Ignacio Iglesias Villanueva

27 August 2018 2	Levante	1–2	Celta Vigo	Valencia
20:15 CEST (UTC+02:00)	Campaña (yellow card) 74'; Morales 78' (pen.); Róber (yellow card) 90+6'	Report	Sisto 10'; Gómez 35'; Mallo (yellow card) 63'; Sergio (yellow card) 77'; Boufal (yellow card) 90+3'	Stadium: Ciutat de València; Attendance: 19,592; Referee: Alejandro Hernández Hernández

2 September 2018 3	Levante	2–2	Valencia	Valencia
12:00 CEST (UTC+02:00)	Roger 13', 33'; Coke (yellow card) 45' (yellow-red card) 76'; Chema (yellow card) 48'; Morales (yellow card) 90+4'	Report	Cheryshev 16'; Parejo 52' (pen.); Torres (yellow card) 90+3'; Mina (yellow card) 90+4'	Stadium: Ciutat de València; Attendance: 22,550; Referee: Xavier Estrada Fernández

16 September 2018 4	Espanyol	1–0	Levante	Barcelona
16:15 CEST (UTC+02:00)	García 52'; Vilà (yellow card) 90+4'	Report	Chema (yellow card) 61'; Luna (yellow card) 90+4'	Stadium: RCDE Stadium; Attendance: 18,172; Referee: Alberto Undiano Mallenco

23 September 2018 5	Levante	2–6	Sevilla	Valencia
12:00 CEST (UTC+02:00)	Roger 12'; Postigo (yellow card) 20'; Simon 90'	Report	Ben Yedder 11', 35', 45'; Carriço 21'; Silva 49'; Sarabia 59'; Vidal (yellow card) 62'	Stadium: Ciutat de València; Attendance: 20,143; Referee: Guillermo Cuadra Fernández

27 September 2018 6	Valladolid	2–1	Levante	Valladolid
20:00 CEST (UTC+02:00)	Ünal 50'; Nacho 56'; Antoñito (yellow card) 74'	Report	Morales (yellow card) 22'; Vukčević (yellow card) 41' (yellow-red card) 54'; Postigo 47'; Campaña (yellow card) 90+6'	Stadium: José Zorrilla; Attendance: 16,420; Referee: David Medié Jiménez

30 September 2018 7	Levante	2–1	Alavés	Valencia
18:30 CEST (UTC+02:00)	Jason 19', (yellow card) 45'; Toño 36', (yellow card) 90+4'; Prcić (yellow card) 73'; Rochina (yellow card) 80'; Morales (yellow card) 85'; Chema (yellow card) 90+2'; Capaña (yellow card) 90+4'	Report	Sobrino 5', (yellow card) 86'	Stadium: Ciutat de València; Attendance: 20,239; Referee: Mario Melero López

6 October 2018 8	Getafe	0–1	Levante	Getafe
16:15 CEST (UTC+02:00)	Dakonam (yellow card) 13'; Antunes (yellow card) 26'; Portillo (red card) 90+1'; Ibanez (yellow card) 90+1'; Suárez (yellow card) 90+2'	Report	Boateng (yellow card) 22'; Prcic (yellow card) 31'; Jason (yellow card) 33'; Róber (yellow card) 42'; Bardhi 60'; Rochina (yellow card) 90'	Stadium: Coliseum Alfonso Pérez; Attendance: 9,375; Referee: José Luis Munuera Montero

20 October 2018 9	Real Madrid	1–2	Levante	Madrid
13:00 CEST (UTC+02:00)	Marcelo 72', (yellow card) 90+3'	Report	Morales 6'; Roger 13' (pen.); Cabaco (yellow card) 53'; Jason (yellow card) 89'	Stadium: Santiago Bernabéu; Attendance: 63,762; Referee: Guillermo Cuadra Fernández

27 October 2018 10	Levante	2–0	Leganés	Valencia
18:30 CEST (UTC+02:00)	Roger 14'; Campana (yellow card) 61'; Róber (yellow card) 83'; Rochina 90'	Report	Siovas (yellow card) 53'; Omeruo (yellow card) 70'	Stadium: Ciutat de València; Attendance: 19,754; Referee: Ricardo de Burgos Bengoetxea

4 November 2018 11	Villarreal	1–1	Levante	Villarreal
16:15 CET (UTC+01:00)	Costa (yellow card) 30'; Cáseres (yellow card) 39'; Pedraza 90+3'; Álvaro (yellow card) 90+4'	Report	Jason (yellow card) 31'; Rochina (yellow card) 37'; Funes Mori 77' (o.g.); Bardhi (yellow card) 78'	Stadium: Estadio de la Cerámica; Attendance: 16,855; Referee: Carlos del Cerro Grande

11 November 2018 12	Levante	1–3	Real Sociedad	Valencia
21:00 CET (UTC+01:00)	Chema 4', (yellow card) 24'; Boateng (yellow card) 13'; Morales (yellow card) 49'; Bardhi (yellow card) 65'; Campana (yellow card) 76'; Olazabal (yellow card) 88'	Report	Illarramendi (yellow card) 53'; Hernandez 73'; Juanmi 77'; Oyarzabal 83'	Stadium: Ciutat de València; Attendance: 19,890; Referee: David Medié Jiménez

24 November 2018 13	Huesca	2–2	Levante	Huesca
18:30 CET (UTC+01:00)	Pulido (yellow card) 12'; Rivera 23'; Etxeita 51', (yellow card) 76'; Jovanović (yellow card) 75'; Ávila (yellow card) 81' (yellow-red card) 90+6'	Report	Vukčević (yellow card) 10'; Roger 45+1'; Prcić (yellow card) 67'; Boateng 74'; Toño (yellow card) 81'	Stadium: El Alcoraz; Attendance: 6,496; Referee: Xavier Estrada Fernández

3 December 2018 14	Levante	3–0	Athletic Bilbao	Valencia
21:00 CET (UTC+01:00)	Campaña (yellow card) 24', (goal) 59'; Chema 45+4'; Rochina (yellow card) 60'; Roger 69'	Report	Núñez (yellow card) 40'; Aduriz (yellow card) 40'; Martínez (yellow card) 65'; Nolaskoain (red card) 73'; Susaeta (yellow card) 84'; Muniain (yellow card) 90+4'	Stadium: Ciutat de València; Attendance: 19,928; Referee: Santiago Jaime Latre

9 December 2018 15	Eibar	4–4	Levante	Eibar
12:00 CET (UTC+01:00)	Enrich 8'; Escalante 57', (yellow card) 77'; Charles 61' (pen.), 65'; José Ángel (yellow card) 90+1'	Report	Toño (yellow card) 1'; Morales 9'; Róber 25'; Oliveira 75' (o.g.); Campaña (yellow card) 82'; Mayoral 90+1'	Stadium: Ipurua; Attendance: 5,238; Referee: Javier Alberola Rojas

16 December 2018 16	Levante	0–5	Barcelona	Valencia
20:45 CET (UTC+01:00)	Róber (yellow card) 25'; Jason (yellow card) 59'; Cabaco (red card) 76'	Report	O. Dembélé (yellow card) 18'; Suárez 34'; I. Rakitić (yellow card) 36'; Messi 43', 47', 60'; Jordi Alba (yellow card) 45'; Piqué 88'	Stadium: Ciutat de València; Attendance: 23,736; Referee: José Luis González González

23 December 2018 17	Rayo Vallecano	2–1	Levante	Madrid
18:30 CET (UTC+01:00)	Toño 23' (o.g.); De Tomás 67'; Imbula (yellow card) 90'; Dimitrievski (yellow card) 90+5'	Report	Postigo (yellow card) 58'; Rochina 60', (yellow card) 80'	Stadium: Vallecas; Attendance: 11,206; Referee: Ignacio Iglesias Villanueva

4 January 2019 18	Levante	2–2	Girona	Valencia
19:00 CET (UTC+01:00)	Postigo (yellow card) 21', (red card) 69'; Toño (yellow card) 28'; Bardhi (yellow card) 56'; Morales 58'; Coke 86'	Report	Portu 31'; Stuani (yellow card) 35'; García 72'	Stadium: Ciutat de València; Attendance: 19,415; Referee: Alberto Undiano Mallenco

13 January 2019 19	Atlético Madrid	1–0	Levante	Madrid
12:00 CET (UTC+01:00)	Griezmann 57' (pen.)	Report	Jason (yellow card) 42'; Cabaco (yellow card) 85'; Campaña (yellow card) 90+4'	Stadium: Wanda Metropolitano; Attendance: 57,093; Referee: Eduardo Prieto Iglesias

20 January 2019 20	Levante	2–0	Valladolid	Valencia
18:30 CET (UTC+01:00)	Bardhi (yellow card) 14'; Coke 42', (yellow card) 90+7'; Rochina (yellow card) 55'; Jason (yellow card) 61'; Cabaco (yellow card) 87'; Roger 90+5', (yellow card) 90+5'	Report	Ünal (yellow card) 15'; Antoñito (yellow card) 40'; Fernández (yellow card) 78'; Calero (yellow card) 90'; Verde (yellow card) 90+7'	Stadium: Ciutat de València; Attendance: 19,107; Referee: Santiago Jaime Latre

26 January 2019 21	Sevilla	5–0	Levante	Seville
13:00 CET (UTC+01:00)	Mercado (yellow card) 40'; Ben Yedder 48'; Banega (yellow card) 56'; Silva 60'; Vázquez 71'; Sarabia 80' (pen.); Promes 90'	Report	Róber (yellow card) 86'	Stadium: Ramón Sánchez Pizjuán; Attendance: 34,220; Referee: Javier Alberola Rojas

2 February 2019 22	Levante	0–0	Getafe	Valencia
13:00 CET (UTC+01:00)	Rochina (yellow card) 20'; Campaña (yellow card) 21'; Cabaco (yellow card) 56'; Jason (yellow card) 90+4'	Report	Flamini (yellow card) 22'; Miquel (yellow card) 31'; Foulquier (yellow card) 34'	Stadium: Ciutat de València; Attendance: 18,437; Referee: Adrián Cordero Vega

11 February 2019 23	Alavés	2–0	Levante	Vitoria-Gasteiz
21:00 CET (UTC+01:00)	Laguardia 23', (yellow card) 70'; Pina (yellow card) 48'; Brašanac (yellow card) 65'; Jony 90+3'	Report	Cabaco (yellow card) 44'; Luna (yellow card) 80'	Stadium: Mendizorrotza; Attendance: 13,691; Referee: Alberto Undiano Mallenco

16 February 2019 24	Celta Vigo	1–4	Levante	Vigo
13:00 CET (UTC+01:00)	Boufal (yellow card) 44'; Boudebouz (red card) 49'; Méndez 88' (pen.)	Report	Morales 20', 62'; Coke 40'; Doukouré (yellow card) 80'; Mayoral 89'	Stadium: Abanca-Balaídos; Attendance: 15,479; Referee: Santiago Jaime Latre

24 February 2019 25	Levante	1–2	Real Madrid	Valencia
20:45 CET (UTC+01:00)	Roger (yellow card) 25', (goal) 60'; Rochina (yellow card) 57' (yellow-red card) 88'; López (yellow card) 82'; Luna (yellow card) 84'	Report	Nacho (yellow card) 28' (yellow-red card) 86'; Benzema 43' (pen.); Vázquez (yellow card) 68'; Bale 78' (pen.)	Stadium: Ciutat de València; Attendance: 23,018; Referee: Ignacio Iglesias Villanueva

4 March 2019 26	Leganés	1–0	Levante	Leganés
21:00 CET (UTC+01:00)	Óscar 13', (yellow card) 90+5'; Recio (yellow card) 44'; Reyes (yellow card) 65'; Cuéllar (yellow card) 70'; Siovas (yellow card) 82'; Tarín (yellow card) 87'	Report	Cabaco (yellow card) 30'; Vezo (yellow card) 82'; Jason (yellow card) 86'; Coke (yellow card) 86'	Stadium: Municipal de Butarque; Attendance: 9,758; Referee: Jesús Gil Manzano

10 March 2019 27	Levante	0–2	Villarreal	Valencia
18:30 CET (UTC+01:00)	Cabaco (yellow card) 36'; Campaña (yellow card) 76'; Rochina (yellow card) 85'	Report	Mario Gaspar (yellow card) 23'; Gerard (yellow card) 39'; Toko Ekambi (yellow card) 60'; Funes Mori (yellow card) 69'; Iborra (yellow card) 82'; Róber 90+3' (o.g.); Chukwueze 90+6'	Stadium: Ciutat de València; Attendance: 20,149; Referee: José María Sánchez Martínez

15 March 2019 28	Real Sociedad	1–1	Levante	San Sebastián
21:00 CET (UTC+01:00)	Januzaj 26'; Sandro (yellow card) 44'; Merino (yellow card) 70'	Report	Vezo (yellow card) 30'; Chema (yellow card) 38'; Mayoral 79'	Stadium: Anoeta; Attendance: 20,605; Referee: Adrián Cordero Vega

31 March 2019 29	Levante	2–2	Eibar	Valencia
12:00 CEST (UTC+02:00)	Morales 5'; Rochina 26'; Bardhi (yellow card) 40'; Vukčević (yellow card) 83'	Report	Escalante 19'; Enrich 78'; Cucurella (yellow card) 87'	Stadium: Ciutat de València; Attendance: 16,198; Referee: Eduardo Prieto Iglesias

3 April 2019 30	Athletic Bilbao	3–2	Levante	Bilbao
19:30 CEST (UTC+02:00)	Berchiche 5', (yellow card) 77'; R. García (yellow card) 6'; Fernández 27' (o.g.); Muniain (yellow card) 78', (goal) 90+3' (pen.)	Report	Morales (yellow card) 4'; Vezo (yellow card) 43'; Postigo (yellow card) 45'; Roger 51' (pen.), (yellow card) 77'; Cabaco (yellow card) 85' (yellow-red card) 90+6', (goal) 89'; Simon (yellow card) 90+1'	Stadium: San Mamés; Attendance: 36,450; Referee: José Luis Munuera Montero

7 April 2019 31	Levante	2–2	Huesca	Valencia
18:30 CEST (UTC+02:00)	Roger 19', (yellow card) 58'; Chema (yellow card) 36'; Morales 65' (pen.)	Report	Hernández (yellow card) 40'; Gallego 63'; Ávila 69', (yellow card) 83'; Diéguez (yellow card) 76'; Juanpi (yellow card) 90+1'	Stadium: Ciutat de València; Attendance: 19,824; Referee: Carlos del Cerro Grande

14 April 2019 32	Valencia	3–1	Levante	Valencia
20:45 CEST (UTC+02:00)	Mina 2', 63'; Soler (yellow card) 33'; Guedes 57'; Lee (yellow card) 83'	Report	Soler 56' (o.g.); Mayoral (yellow card) 81'; Cabaco (yellow card) 89'	Stadium: Mestalla; Attendance: 42,220; Referee: Alberto Undiano Mallenco

21 April 2019 33	Levante	2–2	Espanyol	Valencia
12:00 CEST (UTC+02:00)	Rochina (yellow card) 30' (yellow-red card) 74', (goal) 72'; Chema (yellow card) 43'; Vezo 62'; Morales (yellow card) 82'	Report	Iglesias 16'; Roca 65'; Sánchez (yellow card) 70'	Stadium: Ciutat de València; Attendance: 16,876; Referee: Jesús Gil Manzano

24 April 2019 34	Levante	4–0	Real Betis	Valencia
21:30 CEST (UTC+02:00)	Campaña 9'; Vukčević (yellow card) 28'; Loren 32' (o.g.); Morales 56' (pen.); Coke 81'; Róber (yellow card) 90'	Report	Sidnei (yellow card) 26'; Mandi (yellow card) 61'; Kaptoum (yellow card) 80'	Stadium: Ciutat de València; Attendance: 20,394; Referee: Santiago Jaime Latre

27 April 2019 35	Barcelona	1–0	Levante	Barcelona
20:45 CEST (UTC+02:00)	Rakitić (yellow card) 14'; Messi 62'; Piqué (yellow card) 70'; Semedo (yellow card) 77'; Busquets (yellow card) 90+1'	Report	Rochina (yellow card) 56'; Vezo (yellow card) 58'; Coke (yellow card) 83'	Stadium: Camp Nou; Attendance: 91,917; Referee: Ricardo de Burgos Bengoetxea

4 May 2019 36	Levante	4–1	Rayo Vallecano	Valencia
13:00 CEST (UTC+02:00)	Campaña 14', (yellow card) 85'; Vezo 43'; Jason 85'; Bardhi 90'	Report	Medrán (yellow card) 58'; Suárez (yellow card) 68'; García 71'; Embarba (yellow card) 78' (yellow-red card) 82'	Stadium: Ciutat de València; Attendance: 19,868; Referee: Xavier Estrada Fernández

12 May 2019 37	Girona	1–2	Levante	Girona
18:30 CEST (UTC+02:00)	Douglas (yellow card) 48'; Stuani 60'; Lozano (yellow card) 62'	Report	Jason (yellow card) 27'; Bardhi (yellow card) 49', (goal) 86'; Morales 62'; Cabaco (yellow card) 90+5'	Stadium: Montilivi; Attendance: 13,342; Referee: Carlos del Cerro Grande

18 May 2019 38	Levante	2–2	Atlético Madrid	Valencia
13:00 CEST (UTC+02:00)	Cabaco 6'; Roger 36'	Report	Montero (yellow card) 39'; Correa (red card) 51'; Rodri 68'; Camello 79'	Stadium: Ciutat de València; Attendance: 20,575; Referee: Ignacio Iglesias Villanueva

=== Copa del Rey ===
==== Round of 32 ====
30 October 2018 First leg	Lugo	1–1	Levante	Lugo
19:30 CET (UTC+01:00)	Herrera 11'; Escriche (yellow card) 31'	Report	López (yellow card) 3'; Mayoral 53'; Dwamena (yellow card) 66'	Stadium: Estadio Anxo Carro; Attendance: 2,389; Referee: Pablo González Fuertes

6 December 2018 Second leg	Levante	2–0 (3–1 agg.)	Lugo	Valencia
12:00 CET (UTC+01:00)	Boateng (yellow card) 14'; Cabaco (yellow card) 38'; Coke 80'; Dwamena 90+3'	Report	José Carlos (yellow card) 42'	Stadium: Ciutat de València; Attendance: 10,805; Referee: Guillermo Cuadra Fernández

==== Round of 16 ====
10 January 2019 First leg	Levante	2–1	Barcelona	Valencia
21:30 CET (UTC+01:00)	Cabaco 4', (yellow card) 49'; Mayoral 18', (yellow card) 90+3'; Prcić (yellow card) 41'	Report	Murillo (yellow card) 22'; Aleñá (yellow card) 39'; Chumi (yellow card) 43'; Sergio (yellow card) 74'; Coutinho 85' (pen.)	Stadium: Estadi Ciutat de València; Attendance: 17,614; Referee: Ricardo de Burgos Bengoetxea

17 January 2019 Second leg	Barcelona	3–0 (4–2 agg.)	Levante	Barcelona
21:30 CET (UTC+01:00)	O. Dembélé 30', 31'; Rakitić (yellow card) 43'; Murillo (yellow card) 45'; Messi 54'	Report	Postigo (yellow card) 33'; Cabaco (yellow card) 75'; Prcić (yellow card) 84'; Róber (yellow card) 90+2'	Stadium: Camp Nou; Attendance: 42,838; Referee: José María Sánchez Martínez

== Statistics ==
=== Appearances ===
Last updated on 18 May 2019.

No.	Pos	Nat	Player	Total		La Liga		Copa del Rey	
No.	Pos	Nat	Player	Apps	Goals	Apps	Goals	Apps	Goals
Goalkeepers
1	GK	(Spain) ESP	Koke Vegas	1	0	1	0	0	0
13	GK	(Spain) ESP	Oier Olazábal	21	0	21	0	0	0
25	GK	(Spain) ESP	Aitor Fernández	20	0	16	0	4	0
Defenders
3	DF	(Spain) ESP	Toño	21	1	21	1	0	0
4	DF	(Spain) ESP	Róber	36	1	32+1	1	3	0
6	DF	(Spain) ESP	Chema	22	2	13+7	2	2	0
12	DF	(Spain) ESP	Coke	29	5	19+7	4	3	1
14	DF	(Portugal) POR	Rúben Vezo	15	2	15	2	0	0
15	DF	(Spain) ESP	Sergio Postigo	23	1	17+4	1	2	0
18	DF	(Uruguay) URU	Erick Cabaco	24	3	20+1	2	3	1
19	DF	(Spain) ESP	Pedro López	10	0	4+5	0	1	0
22	DF	(Spain) ESP	Antonio Luna	18	0	14+2	0	2	0
Midfielders
5	MF	(Ivory Coast) CIV	Cheick Doukouré	11	0	3+5	0	1+2	0
10	MF	(North Macedonia) MKD	Enis Bardhi	37	3	30+5	3	1+1	0
11	MF	(Spain) ESP	José Luis Morales	38	12	35+2	12	0+1	0
17	MF	(Montenegro) MNE	Nikola Vukčević	15	0	9+5	0	1	0
23	MF	(Spain) ESP	Jason	34	2	26+4	2	0+4	0
24	MF	(Spain) ESP	José Campaña	39	3	36	3	2+1	0
27	MF	(Spain) ESP	Fran Manzanara	5	0	1+3	0	1	0
Forwards
2	FW	(Spain) ESP	Borja Mayoral	33	5	16+13	3	4	2
7	FW	(Nigeria) NGR	Moses Simon	23	1	8+12	1	3	0
9	FW	(Spain) ESP	Roger	30	12	23+7	12	0	0
16	FW	(Spain) ESP	Rubén Rochina	28	4	22+4	4	1+1	0
20	FW	(Ghana) GHA	Raphael Dwamena	14	1	1+10	0	2+1	1
Players who have made an appearance or had a squad number this season but have left the club
8	MF	(Bosnia and Herzegovina) BIH	Sanjin Prcić	14	0	6+4	0	4	0
14	MF	(Spain) ESP	Samu	1	0	0	0	1	0
21	FW	(Ghana) GHA	Emmanuel Boateng	19	1	7+9	1	3	0
