= 2019–20 Getafe CF season =

Getafe
2019–20 season
- President: Ángel Torres
- Manager: José Bordalás
- Stadium: Coliseum Alfonso Pérez
- La Liga: 8th
- Copa del Rey: Second round
- UEFA Europa League: Round of 16
- Top goalscorer: League: Jaime Mata (11); All: Ángel; Jaime Mata (14 each)
- Highest home attendance: 15,426 (vs Real Madrid, 4 January 2020)
- Lowest home attendance: 6,535 (vs Levante, 1 December 2019)
- Average home league attendance: 11,274
- Biggest win: Getafe 4–0 Levante
- Biggest defeat: Getafe 0–3 Real Madrid; Getafe 0–3 Sevilla
Home colours	Away colours	Third colours

The 2019–20 season was Getafe Club de Fútbol's 36th season in existence and the club's 3rd consecutive season in the top flight of Spanish football. In addition to the domestic league, Getafe participated in this season's edition of the Copa del Rey, and also participated in the UEFA Europa League. The season was slated to cover a period from 1 July 2019 to 30 June 2020. It was extended extraordinarily beyond 30 June due to the COVID-19 pandemic in Spain.

== Players ==
=== Squad ===
As of 31 January 2020

Note: Flags indicate national team as defined under FIFA eligibility rules; some limited exceptions apply. Players may hold more than one non-FIFA nationality.

No.	Pos.	Nation	Player
1	GK	ARG	Leandro Chichizola
2	DF	TOG	Djené Dakonam
4	DF	URU	Erick Cabaco
5	MF	NGR	Peter Etebo (on loan from Stoke City)
6	DF	ESP	Chema
7	FW	ESP	Jaime Mata
8	MF	ESP	Francisco Portillo
9	FW	ESP	Ángel
11	FW	SEN	Amath Ndiaye
12	DF	CMR	Allan Nyom
13	GK	ESP	David Soria
14	FW	BRA	Deyverson (on loan from Palmeiras)

No.	Pos.	Nation	Player
15	DF	ESP	Marc Cucurella
16	DF	ESP	Xabier Etxeita
17	DF	URU	Mathías Olivera
18	MF	URU	Mauro Arambarri
19	FW	ESP	Jorge Molina (captain)
20	MF	SRB	Nemanja Maksimović
21	MF	MAR	Fayçal Fajr
22	DF	URU	Damián Suárez
23	MF	ESP	Jason (on loan from Valencia)
24	MF	ESP	David Timor
25	MF	BRA	Kenedy (on loan from Chelsea)

=== Reserve team ===
Note: Flags indicate national team as defined under FIFA eligibility rules; some limited exceptions apply. Players may hold more than one non-FIFA nationality.

No.	Pos.	Nation	Player
26	FW	ESP	Hugo Duro
28	DF	FRA	Florent Poulolo

=== Out of squad ===
Note: Flags indicate national team as defined under FIFA eligibility rules; some limited exceptions apply. Players may hold more than one non-FIFA nationality.

No.	Pos.	Nation	Player
—	GK	SRB	Filip Manojlović

=== Out on loan ===
Note: Flags indicate national team as defined under FIFA eligibility rules; some limited exceptions apply. Players may hold more than one non-FIFA nationality.

No.	Pos.	Nation	Player
—	GK	ESP	Rubén Yáñez (at Huesca until 30 June 2020)
—	DF	ESP	Ignasi Miquel (at Girona until 30 June 2020)
—	DF	ESP	Raúl García (at Real Valladolid until 30 June 2020)
—	MF	ESP	Iván Alejo (at Cádiz until 30 June 2020)
—	MF	ESP	Álvaro Jiménez (at Albacete until 30 June 2020)

No.	Pos.	Nation	Player
—	MF	ESP	José Lazo (at Almería until 30 June 2020)
—	MF	CGO	Merveil Ndockyt (at NK Osijek until 30 June 2020)
—	FW	ESP	Enric Gallego (at Osasuna until 30 June 2020)
—	FW	SCO	Jack Harper (at Alcorcón until 30 June 2020)

== Transfers ==
=== In ===
Date	Player	From	Type	Fee	Ref
30 June 2019	(Spain) Iván Alejo	Málaga	Loan return		
30 June 2019	(Spain) Chuli	Extremadura	Loan return		
30 June 2019	(Spain) Robert Ibáñez	Osasuna	Loan return		
30 June 2019	(Spain) Álvaro Jiménez	Sporting Gijón	Loan return		
30 June 2019	(Spain) José Lazo	Lugo	Loan return		
30 June 2019	(Serbia) Filip Manojlović	(Greece) Panionios	Loan return		
30 June 2019	(Republic of the Congo) Merveil Ndockyt	Barcelona B	Loan return		
1 July 2019	(Spain) Raúl García	Girona	Transfer	Free	
1 July 2019	(Scotland) Jack Harper	Málaga	Transfer	€1.5M	
8 July 2019	(Spain) Enric Gallego	Huesca	Transfer	€6M	
18 July 2019	(Spain) Marc Cucurella	Barcelona	Loan		
24 July 2019	(Cameroon) Allan Nyom	(England) West Bromwich Albion	Transfer	Undisclosed	
3 August 2019	(Morocco) Fayçal Fajr	(France) Caen	Transfer	€1.5M	
13 August 2019	(Spain) Xabier Etxeita	Athletic Bilbao	Transfer	Free	
29 August 2019	(Spain) David Timor	Las Palmas	Transfer	Free	
2 September 2019	(Spain) Jason	Valencia	Loan		
2 September 2019	(Brazil) Kenedy	(England) Chelsea	Loan		
8 January 2020	(Nigeria) Peter Etebo	(England) Stoke City	Loan		
23 January 2020	(Brazil) Deyverson	(Brazil) Palmeiras	Loan		

=== Out ===
Date	Player	To	Type	Fee	Ref
30 June 2019	(Uruguay) Sebastián Cristóforo	(Italy) Fiorentina	Loan return		
30 June 2019	(Guadeloupe) Dimitri Foulquier	(England) Watford	Loan return		
30 June 2019	(Spain) Samuel Sáiz	(England) Leeds United	Loan return		
12 July 2019	(Spain) Álvaro Jiménez	Albacete	Loan		
14 July 2019	(Japan) Gaku Shibasaki	Deportivo La Coruña	Transfer	Free	
25 July 2019	(Spain) Miguel Ángel	Fuenlabrada	Loan		
10 August 2019	(Scotland) Jack Harper	Alcorcón	Loan		
12 August 2019	(Spain) Robert Ibáñez	Osasuna	Transfer	€2M	
10 August 2019	(Spain) Ignasi Miquel	Girona	Loan		
20 August 2019	(Spain) José Lazo	Almería	Loan	€250K	
22 August 2019	(Spain) Rubén Yáñez	Huesca	Loan		
28 August 2019	(Spain) Chuli	Recreativo	Transfer	Free	
28 August 2019	(Republic of the Congo) Merveil Ndockyt	(Croatia) Osijek	Loan		
30 August 2019	(Spain) Iván Alejo	Cádiz	Loan		
13 January 2020	(Spain) Raúl García	Valladolid	Loan		
20 January 2020	(Uruguay) Leandro Cabrera	Espanyol	Transfer	€9M	
23 January 2020	(Spain) Markel Bergara	Retired			

== Kits ==
Home (Domestic)	Away	Third	Home (Europe)

== Pre-season and friendlies ==
Win Draw Loss

20 July 2019 Iberian Cup	Portimonense (Portugal)	0–0 (2–3 p)	(Spain) Getafe	Portimão, Portugal
20:30 WEST (UTC+1)				Stadium: Estádio Municipal de Portimão

21 July 2019 Iberian Cup	Porto (Portugal)	2–1	(Spain) Getafe	Portimão, Portugal
20:30 WEST (UTC+1)	Pepe 52'; F. Silva 81'		Cabrera 39'	Stadium: Estádio Municipal de Portimão; Referee: Quitério Almeida

24 July 2019 Friendly	Getafe (Spain)	3–0	(Spain) Rayo Majadahonda	Getafe, Spain
20:00 CEST (UTC+2)	Molina 54'; Mata 86', 90'			Stadium: Ciudad Deportiva de Getafe

27 July 2019 Friendly	Sporting Gijón (Spain)	1–1	(Spain) Getafe	Villares de la Reina, Spain
20:00 CEST (UTC+2)	Đurđević 68'		Cucurella 88'	Stadium: Helmántico Stadium; Referee: González González

31 July 2019 Friendly	Getafe (Spain)	1–1	(Spain) Albacete	Orihuela, Spain
19:45 CEST (UTC+2)	Tambien 89' (o.g.)		Alfon 24'	Stadium: Real Club de Golf Campoamor

2 August 2019 Friendly	Getafe (Spain)	1–0	(Italy) Crotone	Getafe, Spain
20:00 CEST (UTC+2)	Molina 22'			Stadium: Coliseum Alfonso Pérez

7 August 2019 Friendly	Getafe (Spain)	0–0	(Spain) RCD Mallorca	San Pedro de Alcántara, Spain
19:30 CEST (UTC+2)				Stadium: Marbella Football Center

10 August 2019 Friendly	Getafe (Spain)	4–1	(Italy) Atalanta	Getafe, Spain
21:00 CEST (UTC+2)	Arambarri 9'; Bergara 62'; Olivera 82'; Ángel 90'	Report	Muriel 64' (pen.)	Stadium: Coliseum Alfonso Pérez; Referee: Carlos del Cerro Grande

== Competitions ==
=== Overview ===
Competition	First match	Last match	Starting round	Final position	Record							
Competition	First match	Last match	Starting round	Final position	Pld	W	D	L	GF	GA	GD	Win %
La Liga	18 August 2019	19 July 2020	Matchday 1	8th	38	14	12	12	43	37	+6	36.84
Copa del Rey	18 December 2019	11 January 2020	First round	Second round	2	1	0	1	2	3	−1	50.00
Europa League	19 September 2019	5 August 2020	Group stage	Round of 16	9	5	0	4	11	8	+3	55.56
Total					49	20	12	17	56	48	+8	40.82

Last updated: 5 August 2020
Source: Soccerway

=== La Liga ===
==== League table ====
Pos	Team	Pld	W	D	L	GF	GA	GD	Pts	Qualification or relegation
6	Real Sociedad	38	16	8	14	56	48	+8	56	Qualification for the Europa League group stage
7	Granada	38	16	8	14	52	45	+7	56	Qualification for the Europa League second qualifying round (Note: The 2020 Copa del Rey Final was postponed due to the COVID-19 pandemic in Spain and could not be completed by the UEFA registration deadline of 3 August 2020, so the fifth- and sixth-placed teams in the 2019–20 La Liga, Villarreal and Real Sociedad, entered the 2020–21 UEFA Europa League at the group stage, and the seventh-placed team, Granada, entered at the second qualifying round.)
8	Getafe	38	14	12	12	43	37	+6	54	
9	Valencia	38	14	11	13	46	53	−7	53	
10	Osasuna	38	13	13	12	46	54	−8	52	

Source: La Liga, Soccerway
Rules for classification: 1) Points; 2) Head-to-head points; 3) Head-to-head goal difference; 4) Goal difference; 5) Goals scored; 6) Fair-play points (Note: Head-to-head record is used only after all the matches between the teams in question have been played)

==== Results summary ====
Overall								Home						Away					
Pld	W	D	L	GF	GA	GD	Pts	W	D	L	GF	GA	GD	W	D	L	GF	GA	GD
38	14	12	12	43	37	+6	54	8	6	5	25	20	+5	6	6	7	18	17	+1

Last updated: 19 July 2020.
Source: La Liga

==== Results by round ====
Round	1	2	3	4	5	6	7	8	9	10	11	12	13	14	15	16	17	18	19	20	21	22	23	24	25	26	27	28	29	30	31	32	33	34	35	36	37	38
Ground	A	H	H	A	H	A	H	A	H	A	H	A	H	A	H	A	H	A	H	A	H	A	H	A	H	A	H	A	H	H	A	H	A	A	H	A	H	A
Result	L	D	D	D	W	D	L	W	W	L	W	W	D	D	W	W	W	L	L	W	W	W	W	L	L	W	D	L	D	D	D	W	L	D	L	D	L	L
Position	17	15	17	18	11	10	16	12	9	11	9	7	7	7	7	5	4	6	7	5	4	3	3	3	5	4	5	5	5	5	5	5	6	6	6	6	7	8

Updated to match(es) played on 19 July 2020. Source: La Liga
A = Away; H = Home; W = Win; D = Draw; L = Loss

==== Matches ====
The La Liga schedule was announced on 4 July 2019.

18 August 2019 1	Atlético Madrid	1–0	Getafe	Madrid
22:00 CEST (UTC+2)	Morata 23'; Lodi (yellow card) 41' (yellow-red card) 42'; Saúl (yellow card) 81'	Report	Cabrera (yellow card) 17'; Molina (red card) 38'; Fajr (yellow card) 49'; Nyom (yellow card) 77'; Ángel (yellow card) 90+3'	Stadium: Wanda Metropolitano; Attendance: 55,099; Referee: Guillermo Cuadra Fernández

24 August 2019 2	Getafe	1–1	Athletic Bilbao	Getafe
21:00 CEST (UTC+2)	Mata 12'; Suárez (yellow card) 65'; Bergara (yellow card) 84'	Report	Capa (yellow card) 4'; R. García 6'	Stadium: Coliseum Alfonso Pérez; Attendance: 10,102; Referee: Antonio Mateu Lahoz

31 August 2019 3	Getafe	1–1	Alavés	Getafe
19:00 CEST (UTC+2)	Molina (yellow card) 12', (goal) 24'; Arambarri (yellow card) 33'; Bergara (yellow card) 89'	Report	Joselu 31'; Wakaso (yellow card) 89'	Stadium: Coliseum Alfonso Pérez; Attendance: 10,806; Referee: Mario Melero López

15 September 2019 4	Real Betis	1–1	Getafe	Seville
21:00 CEST (UTC+2)	Mandi (yellow card) 9'; Barragán (yellow card) 13'; Carvalho (red card) 25'; Fekir (yellow card) 53'; Joaquín 73' (pen.); Loren (red card) 90+4'	Report	Mata 15' (pen.); Jason (yellow card) 36'; Nyom (yellow card) 50'; Arambarri (yellow card) 52'; Suárez (yellow card) 74'; Djené (yellow card) 78'; Cucurella (yellow card) 85'	Stadium: Benito Villamarín; Attendance: 47,884; Referee: José Luis González González

22 September 2019 5	Getafe	4–2	Mallorca	Getafe
12:00 CEST (UTC+2)	Baba 7' (o.g.); Molina 33' (pen.); Mata (yellow card) 45+2'; Cabrera (yellow card) 48'; Suárez (yellow card) 59'; Jason (yellow card) 61'; Nyom 63'; Ángel 84'	Report	Sastre (yellow card) 32'; Fabri (yellow card) 60'; Budimir 70', 77'; Febas (yellow card) 79'; Lumor (yellow card) 86'; Baba (yellow card) 87'	Stadium: Coliseum Alfonso Pérez; Attendance: 11,338; Referee: Santiago Jaime Latre

25 September 2019 6	Valencia	3–3	Getafe	Valencia
20:00 CEST (UTC+2)	Gómez 30', 34', (yellow card) 31'; Lee Kang-in 39'	Report	Mata 1', (yellow card) 41'; Nyom (yellow card) 14'; Jason (yellow card) 45+2', (goal) 66'; Djené (yellow card) 56'; Ángel 69'	Stadium: Mestalla; Attendance: 38,070; Referee: José Luis Munuera Montero

28 September 2019 7	Getafe	0–2	Barcelona	Getafe
16:00 CEST (UTC+2)	Bruno (yellow card) 35'; Kenedy (yellow card) 63'; Maksimović (yellow card) 64'; Cucurella (yellow card) 90+3'	Report	Suárez 41'; Busquets (yellow card) 44'; Lenglet (yellow card) 47' (yellow-red card) 82'; Junior 49'; Roberto (yellow card) 77'	Stadium: Coliseum Alfonso Pérez; Attendance: 15,135; Referee: Jesús Gil Manzano

6 October 2019 8	Real Sociedad	1–2	Getafe	San Sebastián
18:30 CEST (UTC+2)	Merino 5'; Llorente (yellow card) 10' (yellow-red card) 53'	Report	Mata (yellow card) 32', (goal) 69'; Suárez (yellow card) 44'; Fajr (yellow card) 73'; Cabrera (yellow card) 80'; Maksimović 89'	Stadium: Anoeta; Attendance: 29,864; Referee: Pablo González Fuertes

19 October 2019 9	Getafe	2–0	Leganés	Getafe
18:30 CEST (UTC+2)	Ángel 64', 84'; Nyom (yellow card) 90+1'	Report	Rosales (yellow card) 23'; Mesa (yellow card) 56'; Omeruo (yellow card) 77'; Siovas (yellow card) 90+2'	Stadium: Coliseum Alfonso Pérez; Attendance: 13,018; Referee: Juan Martínez Munuera

27 October 2019 10	Sevilla	2–0	Getafe	Seville
18:30 CET (UTC+1)	Banega (yellow card) 15'; Hernández 69'; Ocampos 78', (yellow card) 90'	Report	Jason (yellow card) 18'; Mata (yellow card) 23'; Olivera (yellow card) 71'	Stadium: Ramón Sánchez Pizjuán; Attendance: 38,181; Referee: José María Sánchez Martínez

31 October 2019 11	Getafe	3–1	Granada	Getafe
21:15 CET (UTC+1)	Suárez (yellow card) 17'; Ángel (yellow card) 18', (goal) 35'; Arambarri 41', (yellow card) 64'; Soria (yellow card) 81'; Timor 88'; Etxeita (yellow card) 90+4'	Report	Duarte (yellow card) 40'; Gonalons (yellow card) 55'; Germán (yellow card) 57'; Soldado (yellow card) 67'; Puertas 74'; Azeez (yellow card) 88'	Stadium: Coliseum Alfonso Pérez; Attendance: 10,226; Referee: José Luis González González

3 November 2019 12	Celta Vigo	0–1	Getafe	Vigo
18:30 CET (UTC+1)	Araujo (yellow card) 59'; Aidoo (yellow card) 63'; Diop (yellow card) 76'	Report	Kenedy 37'; Timor (yellow card) 41'; Arambarri (yellow card) 46'; Etxeita (yellow card) 71'	Stadium: Balaídos; Attendance: 14,704; Referee: Antonio Mateu Lahoz

10 November 2019 13	Getafe	0–0	Osasuna	Getafe
18:30 CET (UTC+1)	Molina (yellow card) 81'; Nyom (yellow card) 90'	Report	Vidal (yellow card) 49'; Brandon (yellow card) 75'; R. García (yellow card) 75'; Oier (yellow card) 83'	Stadium: Coliseum Alfonso Pérez; Attendance: 10,558; Referee: César Soto Grado

24 November 2019 14	Espanyol	1–1	Getafe	Cornellà de Llobregat
12:00 CET (UTC+1)	Wu Lei 45', (yellow card) 56'; Roca (yellow card) 71'; Granero (yellow card) 80'	Report	Mata 3', (yellow card) 29'; Arambarri (yellow card) 54'; Cucurella (yellow card) 56'; Molina (yellow card) 90+1'	Stadium: RCDE Stadium; Attendance: 22,031; Referee: Pablo González Fuertes

1 December 2019 15	Getafe	4–0	Levante	Getafe
18:30 CET (UTC+1)	Timor (yellow card) 40', (goal) 78'; Jason (yellow card) 48'; Cabrera 54'; Molina 60' (pen.); Ángel 67'	Report	Rochina (yellow card) 39'; Clerc (yellow card) 52'; Radoja (yellow card) 77'	Stadium: Coliseum Alfonso Pérez; Attendance: 6,535; Referee: Xavier Estrada Fernández

8 December 2019 16	Eibar	0–1	Getafe	Eibar
12:00 CET (UTC+1)	Diop (yellow card) 17'; Oliveira (yellow card) 36'; Orellana (yellow card) 43', (red card) 90+7'; Enrich (yellow card) 75'; Escalante (yellow card) 88'	Report	Duro (yellow card) 57'; Ángel 67'	Stadium: Ipurua Municipal Stadium; Attendance: 5,969; Referee: Eduardo Prieto Iglesias

15 December 2019 17	Getafe	2–0	Valladolid	Getafe
12:00 CET (UTC+1)	Cucurella (yellow card) 17', (goal) 36'; Suárez (yellow card) 32'; Portillo (yellow card) 68'; Ángel 82'	Report	Barba (yellow card) 8'; Fernández (yellow card) 30'; Alcaraz (yellow card) 62'	Stadium: Coliseum Alfonso Pérez; Attendance: 7,094; Referee: Antonio Mateu Lahoz

21 December 2019 18	Villarreal	1–0	Getafe	Villarreal
18:30 CET (UTC+1)	Trigueros (yellow card) 28'; Gómez 52'; Gerard (yellow card) 84'	Report	Mata (yellow card) 40'; Olivera (yellow card) 59' (yellow-red card) 61'; Ángel (yellow card) 85'; Suárez (yellow card) 89'	Stadium: Estadio de la Cerámica; Attendance: 14,526; Referee: Santiago Jaime Latre

4 January 2020 19	Getafe	0–3	Real Madrid	Getafe
16:00 CET (UTC+1)	Nyom (yellow card) 34'; Suárez (yellow card) 39'; Portillo (yellow card) 90+5'	Report	Soria 34' (o.g.); Varane 53'; Jović (yellow card) 82'; Mendy (yellow card) 90+5'; Modrić 90+6'	Stadium: Coliseum Alfonso Pérez; Attendance: 15,426; Referee: José Luis Munuera Montero

17 January 2020 20	Leganés	0–3	Getafe	Leganés
21:00 CET (UTC+1)	Mesa (yellow card) 53'; Braithwaite (yellow card) 56'; Arnaiz (yellow card) 66'; Recio (yellow card) 76'; Pérez (yellow card) 90+1'; Silva (yellow card) 90+1'	Report	Cabrera 12'; Nyom (yellow card) 15', (goal) 21'; Mata 33', (yellow card) 72'; Maksimović (yellow card) 64'; Suárez (yellow card) 90+7'	Stadium: Estadio Municipal de Butarque; Attendance: 11,450; Referee: Xavier Estrada Fernández

26 January 2020 21	Getafe	1–0	Real Betis	Getafe
16:00 CET (UTC+1)	Maksimović (yellow card) 49'; Etxeita (yellow card) 74'; Ángel 89' (pen.)	Report	Canales (yellow card) 56'; Bartra (yellow card) 63'; Robles (yellow card) 73'; Mandi (yellow card) 88'; Feddal (red card) 90+5'	Stadium: Coliseum Alfonso Pérez; Attendance: 10,056; Referee: Eduardo Prieto Iglesias

2 February 2020 22	Athletic Bilbao	0–2	Getafe	Bilbao
16:00 CET (UTC+1)	Berchiche (yellow card) 63'; Martínez (yellow card) 86'	Report	Deyverson (yellow card) 12'; Suárez 36', (yellow card) 67'; Arambarri (yellow card) 40'; Mata 50' (pen.), (yellow card) 63'; Nyom (yellow card) 70'	Stadium: San Mamés Stadium; Attendance: 40,291; Referee: Javier Alberola Rojas

8 February 2020 23	Getafe	3–0	Valencia	Getafe
16:00 CET (UTC+1)	Nyom (yellow card) 24'; Molina 58', 67'; Suárez (yellow card) 64'; Arambarri (yellow card) 75'; Mata 87'; Etxeita (yellow card) 90+6'	Report	Torres (yellow card) 63'; Gabriel (yellow card) 64'; Gómez (yellow card) 65'; Diakhaby (yellow card) 71'; Florenzi (red card) 78'	Stadium: Coliseum Alfonso Pérez; Attendance: 13,070; Referee: Ricardo de Burgos Bengoetxea

15 February 2020 24	Barcelona	2–1	Getafe	Barcelona
16:00 CET (UTC+1)	Griezmann 33'; Roberto 39'; Umtiti (yellow card) 49'; Junior (yellow card) 82'; Fati (yellow card) 85'	Report	Ángel 66'; Mata (yellow card) 73'; Kenedy (yellow card) 89'	Stadium: Camp Nou; Attendance: 78,814; Referee: Guillermo Cuadra Fernández

23 February 2020 25	Getafe	0–3	Sevilla	Getafe
18:30 CET (UTC+1)	Cucurella (yellow card) 31'; Etebo (yellow card) 34'; Nyom (yellow card) 35'; Molina (yellow card) 59'; Djené (yellow card) 62'; Chema (yellow card) 86'; Maksimović (yellow card) 90+2'	Report	Reguilón (yellow card) 35'; Ocampos 43'; Koundé (yellow card) 56', (goal) 75'; Fernando 67'; Navas (yellow card) 90+3'	Stadium: Coliseum Alfonso Pérez; Attendance: 13,196; Referee: Xavier Estrada Fernández

1 March 2020 26	Mallorca	0–1	Getafe	Palma
18:30 CET (UTC+1)	Chavarría (yellow card) 78'; Hernández (yellow card) 90'; Sevilla (yellow card) 90' (yellow-red card) 90+1'	Report	Ángel (yellow card) 30'; Etxeita (yellow card) 59'; Maksimović 67'; Deyverson (yellow card) 81'; Etebo (yellow card) 82'; Olivera (yellow card) 87'	Stadium: Estadi de Son Moix; Attendance: 14,022; Referee: Mario Melero López

7 March 2020 27	Getafe	0–0	Celta Vigo	Getafe
21:00 CET (UTC+1)	Cucurella (yellow card) 45+1'; Maksimović (yellow card) 54'; Arambarri (yellow card) 55' (yellow-red card) 82'; Mata (yellow card) 61'; Suárez (yellow card) 72'	Report	Araujo (yellow card) 32'; Mallo (yellow card) 57'; Blanco (yellow card) 60'; Smolov (yellow card) 75'; Fernández (yellow card) 81'	Stadium: Coliseum Alfonso Pérez; Attendance: 11,042; Referee: José María Sánchez Martínez

12 June 2020 28	Granada	2–1	Getafe	Granada
19:30 CEST (UTC+2)	Díaz (yellow card) 10'; Fernández (yellow card) 16', (goal) 79'; Soldado (yellow card) 45+1'; Gonalons (yellow card) 49'; Herrera (yellow card) 68'; Djené 70' (o.g.); Germán (yellow card) 90'	Report	Timor 20'; Etxeita (yellow card) 23'; Etebo (yellow card) 61'; Duro (yellow card) 90'; Suárez (yellow card) 90'	Stadium: Nuevo Los Cármenes; Attendance: 0 Referee: David Medié Jiménez
Note: The match was originally scheduled for 15 March, but was postponed due to the COVID-19 pandemic, and rescheduled to 12 June. It was played behind closed doors.

16 June 2020 29	Getafe	0–0	Espanyol	Getafe
19:30 CEST (UTC+2)	Olivera (yellow card) 12'; Cucurella (yellow card) 63'; Chema (yellow card) 78'	Report	Calleri (yellow card) 3'; Espinosa (red card) 16'; Di. López (yellow card) 86'	Stadium: Coliseum Alfonso Pérez; Attendance: 0 Referee: José Luis Munuera Montero
Note: The match was originally scheduled for 22 March, but was postponed due to the 2020 coronavirus pandemic, and rescheduled to 16 June. It was played behind closed doors.

20 June 2020 30	Getafe	1–1	Eibar	Getafe
19:30 CEST (UTC+2)	Etebo 30'; Djené (yellow card) 45+4'; Etxeita (yellow card) 85'; Nyom (yellow card) 90'	Report	Charles 45+6'	Stadium: Coliseum Alfonso Pérez; Attendance: 0 Referee: Javier Alberola Rojas
Note: The match was originally scheduled for 5 April, but was postponed due to the 2020 coronavirus pandemic, and rescheduled to 20 June. It was played behind closed doors.

23 June 2020 31	Valladolid	1–1	Getafe	Valladolid
19:30 CEST (UTC+2)	Ünal (yellow card) 22', (goal) 45+5' (pen.); Salisu (yellow card) 49'; Joaquín (yellow card) 57'; Alcaraz (yellow card) 85'; Kiko (yellow card) 90+6'	Report	Nyom (yellow card) 23'; Mata 41'; Djené (yellow card) 45+3'	Stadium: José Zorrilla; Attendance: 0 Referee: César Soto Grado
Note: The match was originally scheduled for 12 April, but was postponed due to the 2020 coronavirus pandemic, and rescheduled to 23 June. It was played behind closed doors.

29 June 2020 32	Getafe	2–1	Real Sociedad	Getafe
22:00 CEST (UTC+2)	Olivera (yellow card) 11'; Duro (yellow card) 13'; Mata 20' (pen.), 83', (yellow card) 88'; Chema (yellow card) 43'; Suárez (yellow card) 68'; Etebo (yellow card) 79'	Report	Januzaj 55'; Isak (yellow card) 66'; Oyarzabal (yellow card) 73'; Merino (yellow card) 88'	Stadium: Coliseum Alfonso Pérez; Attendance: 0 Referee: Adrián Cordero Vega
Note: The match was originally scheduled for 22 April, but was postponed due to the 2020 coronavirus pandemic, and rescheduled to 29 June. It was played behind closed doors.

2 July 2020 33	Real Madrid	1–0	Getafe	Madrid
22:00 CEST (UTC+2)	Carvajal (yellow card) 15'; Ramos (yellow card) 26', (goal) 79' (pen.); Modrić (yellow card) 45+4'; Militão (yellow card) 47'; Mariano (yellow card) 90+4'	Report	Timor (yellow card) 1'; Nyom (yellow card) 47'; Suárez (yellow card) 52'; Mata (yellow card) 72'; Arambarri (yellow card) 83'	Stadium: Alfredo di Stéfano; Attendance: 0 Referee: Juan Martínez Munuera
Note: The match was originally scheduled for 26 April, but was postponed due to the 2020 coronavirus pandemic, and rescheduled to 2 July. It was played behind closed doors.

5 July 2020 34	Osasuna	0–0	Getafe	Pamplona
19:30 CEST (UTC+2)	Oier (yellow card) 16'; Aridane (yellow card) 37'; Navas (yellow card) 39'; Pérez (yellow card) 79'; Arnaiz (yellow card) 90+5'	Report	Mata (yellow card) 71'; Cucurella (yellow card) 85'; Molina (yellow card) 87'; Chema (yellow card) 90+3'	Stadium: El Sadar; Attendance: 0 Referee: Mario Melero López
Note: The match was originally scheduled for 3 May, but was postponed due to the 2020 coronavirus pandemic, and rescheduled to 5 July. It was played behind closed doors.

8 July 2020 35	Getafe	1–3	Villarreal	Getafe
20:30 CEST (UTC+2)	Soria (yellow card) 63'; Ángel (yellow card) 68'; Duro 80'; Arambarri (yellow card) 86'; Portillo (yellow card) 87'; Nyom (red card) 90+7'; Exteita (red card) 90+7'; Suarez (red card) 90+7'	Report	Cazorla 66' (pen.), 86' (pen.); Gerard (yellow card) 89'; Peña 90+3'; Iborra (red card) 90+7'	Stadium: Coliseum Alfonso Pérez; Attendance: 0 Referee: Xavier Estrada Fernández
Note: The match was originally scheduled for 10 May, but was postponed due to the 2020 coronavirus pandemic, and rescheduled to 8 July. It was played behind closed doors.

13 July 2020 36	Alavés	0–0	Getafe	Vitoria-Gasteiz
19:30 CEST (UTC+2)	Aguirregabiria (yellow card) 21'; García (yellow card) 56'; Laguardia (yellow card) 75'; Ely (yellow card) 82'	Report	Cucurella (yellow card) 12'; Mata (yellow card) 35'	Stadium: Mendizorrotza; Attendance: 0 Referee: Pablo González Fuertes
Note: The match was originally scheduled for 13 May, but was postponed due to the 2020 coronavirus pandemic, and rescheduled to 13 July. It was played behind closed doors.

16 July 2020 37	Getafe	0–2	Atlético Madrid	Getafe
21:00 CEST (UTC+2)	Molina (yellow card) 68'; Nyom (red card) 90+2'	Report	Giménez (yellow card) 45+4'; Llorente 54'; Saúl (yellow card) 66'; Partey 80'	Stadium: Coliseum Alfonso Pérez; Attendance: 0 Referee: Antonio Mateu Lahoz
Note: The match was originally scheduled for 17 May, but was postponed due to the 2020 coronavirus pandemic, and rescheduled to 16 July. It was played behind closed doors.

19 July 2020 38	Levante	1–0	Getafe	La Nucia
21:00 CEST (UTC+2)	Toño (yellow card) 29'; Radoja (yellow card) 51'; Coke 90+9'	Report	Ángel (yellow card) 13'; Timor (yellow card) 87'; Olivera (yellow card) 90+4'; Suárez (yellow card) 90+4'	Stadium: Camilo Cano; Attendance: 0 Referee: Ricardo de Burgos Bengoetxea
Note: The match was originally scheduled for 24 May, but was postponed due to the 2020 coronavirus pandemic, and rescheduled to 19 July. It was played behind closed doors.

=== Copa del Rey ===
18 December 2019 First round	El Palmar	1–2	Getafe	El Palmar
18:00 CET (UTC+1)	Abenza (yellow card) 19'; Etxeita 25' (o.g.); García (yellow card) 68'	Report	Bruno (yellow card) 37'; Timor (yellow card) 55'; Ángel 63'; Molina 70' (pen.)	Stadium: Municipal; Attendance: 3,000; Referee: José Luis Munuera Montero

11 January 2020 Second round	Badalona	2–0	Getafe	Badalona
19:00 CET (UTC+1)	Pelón (yellow card) 40'; Díaz (yellow card) 61'; Chema Moreno 85'; Esteban 90+3'	Report	Timor (yellow card) 7' (yellow-red card) 30'; Nyom (yellow card) 30'	Stadium: Municipal; Attendance: 4,384; Referee: Antonio Mateu Lahoz

=== UEFA Europa League ===
==== Group stage ====
Pos	Team	Pld	W	D	L	GF	GA	GD	Pts	Qualification	BSL	GET	KRA	TRA
1	(Switzerland) Basel	6	4	1	1	12	4	+8	13	Advance to knockout phase	—	2–1	5–0	2–0
2	(Spain) Getafe	6	4	0	2	8	4	+4	12	Advance to knockout phase	0–1	—	3–0	1–0
3	(Russia) Krasnodar	6	3	0	3	7	11	−4	9		1–0	1–2	—	3–1
4	(Turkey) Trabzonspor	6	0	1	5	3	11	−8	1		2–2	0–1	0–2	—

Source: UEFA
Rules for classification: Group stage tiebreakers

19 September 2019 1	Getafe (Spain)	1–0	(Turkey) Trabzonspor	Getafe, Spain
18:55 CEST (UTC+2)	Ángel 18'; Kenedy (yellow card) 58'; Fajr (yellow card) 66'; Mata (yellow card) 78'	Report	Campi (yellow card) 33'; Sosa (yellow card) 55'	Stadium: Coliseum Alfonso Pérez; Attendance: 5,786; Referee: Matej Jug (Slovenia)

3 October 2019 2	Krasnodar (Russia)	1–2	(Spain) Getafe	Krasnodar, Russia
22:00 MSK (UTC+3)	Vilhena (yellow card) 40'; Fjóluson (yellow card) 43'; Berg (yellow card) 52'; Ari (yellow card) 63', (goal) 69'	Report	Ángel 36', 61', (yellow card) 83'; Bruno (yellow card) 62'; Timor (yellow card) 63' (yellow-red card) 81'; García (yellow card) 75'	Stadium: Krasnodar Stadium; Attendance: 20,035; Referee: Ivan Bebek (Croatia)

24 October 2019 3	Getafe (Spain)	0–1	(Switzerland) Basel	Getafe, Spain
21:00 CEST (UTC+2)	Kenedy (yellow card) 45+3'; Portillo (yellow card) 55'; Ángel (yellow card) 90'	Report	Frei 18', (yellow card) 65'; Cömert (yellow card) 29'; Stocker (yellow card) 35'; Xhaka (yellow card) 39'; Zuffi (yellow card) 51'; Bua (yellow card) 54' (yellow-red card) 74'; Alderete (yellow card) 56'; Nikolić (yellow card) 60'	Stadium: Coliseum Alfonso Pérez; Attendance: 6,213; Referee: Jérôme Brisard (France)

7 November 2019 4	Basel (Switzerland)	2–1	(Spain) Getafe	Basel, Switzerland
18:55 CET (UTC+1)	Arthur 8'; Xhaka (yellow card) 38'; Riveros (yellow card) 44'; Frei 60'	Report	Gallego (yellow card) 17'; Mata 45' (pen.)	Stadium: St. Jakob-Park; Attendance: 26,298; Referee: Serhiy Boyko (Ukraine)

28 November 2019 5	Trabzonspor (Turkey)	0–1	(Spain) Getafe	Trabzon, Turkey
16:50 TRT (UTC+3)	Hosseini (yellow card) 17'; Asan (yellow card) 41'	Report	Mata 50'; Fajr (yellow card) 64'; Nyom (yellow card) 75'; Cucurella (yellow card) 90+1'	Stadium: Şenol Güneş Stadium; Attendance: 11,465; Referee: Andris Treimanis (Latvia)

12 December 2019 6	Getafe (Spain)	3–0	(Russia) Krasnodar	Getafe, Spain
18:55 CET (UTC+1)	Suárez (yellow card) 26'; Cabrera 76'; Molina 79'; Kenedy 86'	Report	Martynovich (yellow card) 14' (yellow-red card) 88'; Gazinsky (yellow card) 26'; Spajić (yellow card) 43'	Stadium: Coliseum Alfonso Pérez; Attendance: 9,389; Referee: Daniel Siebert (Germany)

==== Knockout phase ====
===== Round of 32 =====
20 February 2020 First leg	Getafe (Spain)	2–0	(Netherlands) Ajax	Getafe, Spain
18:55 CET (UTC+1)	Deyverson 38'; Djene (yellow card) 44'; Nyom (yellow card) 55'; Olivera (yellow card) 57'; Kenedy 90+3'	Report	Álvarez (yellow card) 36'; Tagliafico (yellow card) 54'; Babel (yellow card) 55'	Stadium: Coliseum Alfonso Pérez; Attendance: 14,039; Referee: Ruddy Buquet (France)

27 February 2020 Second leg	Ajax (Netherlands)	2–1 (2–3 agg.)	(Spain) Getafe	Amsterdam, Netherlands
21:00 CET (UTC+1)	Danilo 10', (yellow card) 11'; Olivera 63' (o.g.); Blind (yellow card) 66'; Martínez (yellow card) 76'; Eiting (yellow card) 90+3'; Huntelaar (yellow card) 90+8'	Report	Mata 5', (yellow card) 45+2'; Soria (yellow card) 11'; Arambarri (yellow card) 28'; Nyom (yellow card) 41'	Stadium: Johan Cruyff Arena; Attendance: 51,487; Referee: Anastasios Sidiropoulos (Greece)

===== Round of 16 =====
5 August 2020 Round of 16	Inter Milan (Italy)	2–0	(Spain) Getafe	Gelsenkirchen, Germany
21:00 CEST (UTC+2)	Lukaku 33'; Eriksen 83'	Report	Suárez (yellow card) 90+1'	Stadium: Arena AufSchalke; Attendance: 0 Referee: Anthony Taylor (England)
Note: The match between Inter Milan and Getafe in Milan was meant to be played behind closed doors due to an outbreak of COVID-19 in Italy. However, on 11 March the match was indefinitely postponed from its original date of 12 March due to a pandemic of COVID-19 in Italy and subsequent travel restrictions. On 17 June, the match was rescheduled to 5 August to be played in a single leg at Arena AufSchalke in Germany.

== Statistics ==
=== Squad statistics ===
Last updated on 5 August 2020

No.	Pos	Nat	Player	Total		La Liga		Copa del Rey		UEFA Europa League	
No.	Pos	Nat	Player	Apps	Goals	Apps	Goals	Apps	Goals	Apps	Goals
Goalkeepers
1	GK	(Argentina) ARG	Leandro Chichizola	7	0	0	0	2	0	5	0
13	GK	(Spain) ESP	David Soria	42	0	38	0	0	0	4	0
Defenders
2	DF	(Togo) TOG	Djené	42	0	34	0	1	0	7	0
4	DF	(Uruguay) URU	Erick Cabaco	4	0	3+1	0	0	0	0	0
6	DF	(Spain) ESP	Chema	4	0	3+1	0	0	0	0	0
12	DF	(Cameroon) CMR	Allan Nyom	44	2	31+3	2	1	0	8+1	0
15	DF	(Spain) ESP	Marc Cucurella	46	1	37	1	1	0	4+4	0
16	DF	(Spain) ESP	Xabier Etxeita	22	0	16+1	0	2	0	3	0
17	DF	(Uruguay) URU	Mathías Olivera	29	0	21+3	0	0	0	5	0
22	DF	(Uruguay) URU	Damián Suárez	34	1	30	1	0	0	4	0
28	DF	(France) FRA	Florent Poulolo	2	0	0+1	0	1	0	0	0
Midfielders
5	MF	(Nigeria) NGR	Peter Etebo	11	1	6+4	1	0+1	0	0	0
8	MF	(Spain) ESP	Francisco Portillo	23	0	3+13	0	0+1	0	5+1	0
18	MF	(Uruguay) URU	Mauro Arambarri	42	1	34+1	1	0+1	0	5+1	0
20	MF	(Serbia) SRB	Nemanja Maksimović	43	2	33+2	2	1	0	6+1	0
21	MF	(Morocco) MAR	Fayçal Fajr	16	0	5+5	0	1	0	5	0
23	MF	(Spain) ESP	Jason	26	1	14+6	1	2	0	1+3	0
24	MF	(Spain) ESP	David Timor	31	3	10+12	3	2	0	4+3	0
Forwards
7	FW	(Spain) ESP	Jaime Mata	41	14	33+1	11	0	0	6+1	3
9	FW	(Spain) ESP	Ángel	42	14	9+23	10	1+1	1	4+4	3
11	FW	(Senegal) SEN	Amath Ndiaye	7	0	0+7	0	0	0	0	0
19	FW	(Spain) ESP	Jorge Molina	42	7	23+11	5	2	1	2+4	1
26	FW	(Spain) ESP	Hugo Duro	15	1	4+8	1	1	0	0+2	0
Players who have made an appearance or had a squad number this season but have left the club
3	DF	(Portugal) POR	Vitorino Antunes	3	0	0+1	0	2	0	0	0
4	DF	(Spain) ESP	Bruno	8	0	2	0	1	0	5	0
5	MF	(Spain) ESP	Markel Bergara	2	0	0+2	0	0	0	0	0
6	DF	(Uruguay) URU	Leandro Cabrera	21	3	18	2	0	0	2+1	1
10	FW	(Spain) ESP	Enric Gallego	9	0	2+3	0	0+1	0	3	0
14	DF	(Spain) ESP	Raúl García	9	0	3+1	0	1	0	4	0
14	FW	(Brazil) BRA	Deyverson	7	1	3+2	0	0	0	2	1
25	MF	(Brazil) BRA	Kenedy	27	3	3+16	1	0	0	4+4	2

=== Goalscorers ===
Rank	No.	Pos.	Player	La Liga	Copa del Rey	Europa League	Total
1	7	FW	(Spain) Jaime Mata	11	0	3	14
1	9	FW	(Spain) Ángel	10	1	3	14
3	19	FW	(Spain) Jorge Molina	5	1	1	7
4	6	DF	(Uruguay) Leandro Cabrera	2	0	1	3
4	24	MF	(Spain) David Timor	3	0	0	3
4	25	MF	(Brazil) Kenedy	1	0	2	3
7	12	DF	(Cameroon) Allan Nyom	2	0	0	2
7	20	MF	(Serbia) Nemanja Maksimović	2	0	0	2
9	5	MF	(Nigeria) Peter Etebo	1	0	0	1
9	14	FW	(Brazil) Deyverson	0	0	1	1
9	15	DF	(Spain) Marc Cucurella	1	0	0	1
9	18	MF	(Uruguay) Mauro Arambarri	1	0	0	1
9	22	DF	(Uruguay) Damián Suárez	1	0	0	1
9	23	MF	(Spain) Jason	1	0	0	1
9	26	FW	(Spain) Hugo Duro	1	0	0	1
Own goals				1	0	0	1
Total				43	2	11	56

=== Clean sheets ===
As of 16 June 2020

Rank	Name	La Liga	Copa del Rey	Europa League	Total
1	(Spain) David Soria	13	0	2	15
2	(Argentina) Leandro Chichizola	0	0	2	2
Total		13	0	4	17
