= Erick Cabaco =

Uruguayan footballer (born 1995)

Personal information
- Full name: Erick Cathriel Cabaco Almada
- Date of birth: 19 April 1995 (age 31)
- Place of birth: Montevideo, Uruguay
- Height: 1.85 m (6 ft 1 in)
- Position: Centre-back

Youth career
- –2014: Rentistas

Senior career*
Years	Team	Apps	(Gls)
2014–2016	Rentistas	36	(3)
2016–2018	Nacional	7	(0)
2016–2017	→ Nancy (loan)	20	(0)
2016–2017	→ Nancy II (loan)	1	(0)
2017–2018	→ Levante (loan)	14	(0)
2018–2020	Levante	32	(2)
2020–2023	Getafe	34	(0)
2022–2023	→ Granada (loan)	15	(0)
2023–2024	Estoril	6	(0)
2024–2025	Racing Ferrol	4	(0)

International career^{‡}
2015	Uruguay U20	14	(0)
2015	Uruguay U23	1	(0)
Medal record
Representing Uruguay
Men's Football
Pan American Games
Gold medal – first place	2015 Toronto	Team competition
South American U-20 Championship
Third place	2015 Uruguay
- * Club domestic league appearances and goals as of 31 May 2025 ‡ National team caps and goals as of 21:22, 11 October 2023 (UTC)

Erick Cathriel Cabaco Almada (born 19 April 1995) is a Uruguayan footballer who plays as a centre-back.

== Club career ==
Cabaco is a youth exponent from Rentistas. He made his league debut on 6 April 2014. He joined Nacional in January 2016. For the 2016–17 season, he was loaned to AS Nancy who were given an option to sign him permanently.

On 1 September 2017, Cabaco was loaned to La Liga club Levante UD, for one year. On 16 May 2018, Levante triggered the buyout clause included in his loan contract for a reported €2 million.

On 31 January 2020, Cabaco signed a four-and-a-half-year contract with fellow Spanish top tier side Getafe CF. On 26 July 2022, he was joined Granada CF on a one-year loan deal, with the club in the Segunda División.

On 1 August 2023, after helping in Granada's promotion to the first division, Cabaco terminated his link with Geta. Eight days later, he was announced at Portuguese Primeira Liga side G.D. Estoril Praia on a one-year contract.

Cabaco suffered a knee injury in October 2023 which sidelined him for the remainder of the season, and returned to Spain on 15 July 2024, after signing for second division side Racing de Ferrol.

== Career statistics ==
=== Club ===
As of match played 20 May 2023

Appearances and goals by club, season and competition
Club	Season	League			National cup		League cup		Continental		Total	
Club	Season	Division	Apps	Goals	Apps	Goals	Apps	Goals	Apps	Goals	Apps	Goals
Rentistas	2013–14	Primera División	3	1	—		—		—		3	1
Rentistas	2014–15	Primera División	19	0	—		—		2 (Note: Appearance(s) in Copa Sudamericana)	0	21	0
Rentistas	2015–16	Primera División	14	2	—		—		—		14	2
Rentistas	Total		36	3	0	0	0	0	2	0	38	3
Nacional	2015–16	Primera División	7	0	—		—		1 (Note: Appearance(s) in Copa Libertadores)	0	8	0
Nancy (loan)	2016–17	Ligue 1	20	0	1	0	1	0	—		22	0
Nancy II (loan)	2016–17	Championnat de France Amateur	1	0	—		—		—		1	0
Levante (loan)	2017–18	La Liga	14	0	4	0	—		—		18	0
Levante	2018–19	La Liga	21	2	3	1	—		—		24	3
Levante	2019–20	La Liga	11	0	1	0	—		—		12	0
Levante	Total		32	2	4	1	0	0	0	0	36	3
Getafe	2019–20	La Liga	4	0	0	0	—		0	0	4	0
Getafe	2020–21	La Liga	20	0	1	0	—		—		21	0
Getafe	2021–22	La Liga	10	0	2	0	—		—		12	0
Getafe	Total		34	0	3	0	0	0	0	0	37	0
Granada (loan)	2022–23	Segunda División	15	0	1	0	—		—		16	0
Career total			159	5	13	1	1	0	3	0	176	6

== Honours ==
Granada

- Segunda División: 2022–23
