= Youssouf Yalike =

Ivorian footballer (born 1999)

Personal information
- Full name: Youssouf Yalike
- Date of birth: 17 January 1999 (age 27)
- Place of birth: Abidjan, Ivory Coast
- Position: Midfielder

Team information
- Current team: Deportivo Fabril
- Number: Requena

Youth career
- Arras
- 2017–2018: Levante

Senior career*
Years	Team	Apps	(Gls)
2017–2019	Levante B	1	(0)
2017–2019	Levante	0	(0)
2018–2019	→ Torre Levante (loan)	34	(1)
2019–2020	Deportivo Fabril	5	(0)
2020–2021	Eldense	3	(0)
2021	Motril	15	(1)
2021–2022	Villarrobledo	32	(1)
2022–2023	Socuéllamos	20	(1)
2023–2024	Pulpileño	2	(0)
2024	San Clemente	16	(0)
2024–2025	Valdepeñas	13	(0)
2025	Los Llanos de Aridane	12	(0)
2025	Quart de les Valls	4	(0)
2025–	Requena	21	(2)
- * Club domestic league appearances and goals as of 14:58, 6 November 2019 (UTC)

Youssouf Yalike (born 17 January 1999) is an Ivorian footballer who plays for Spanish club Deportivo Fabril as a central midfielder.

== Club career ==
Born in Abidjan, Yalike joined Levante UD in 2017 from locals Arras Football Association, signing his first contract with the club on 22 May. Initially assigned to the Juvenil squad, he made his debut with the reserves on 18 November by coming on as late substitute for Javi Llor in a 3–0 Tercera División away win against CD Olímpic de Xàtiva.

Yalike made his first team debut on 28 November 2017, replacing Jason in a 1–1 home draw against Girona FC, for the season's Copa del Rey. The following 22 August, he joined fourth division side CF Torre Levante on a one-year loan deal.
