= Gonzalo Pereira =

Spanish footballer

Personal information
- Full name: Gonzalo Pereira Cejudo
- Date of birth: 14 February 1997 (age 29)
- Place of birth: Barcelona, Spain
- Height: 1.80 m (5 ft 11 in)
- Position: Centre back

Team information
- Current team: Cornellà

Youth career
- Damm
- 2012–2016: Espanyol
- 2014–2016: → Damm (loan)

Senior career*
Years	Team	Apps	(Gls)
2016–2017	Sabadell B	31	(1)
2017–2018	Reus B	26	(2)
2018–2019	Reus	10	(0)
2019	Calahorra	10	(0)
2019–2020	Levante B	21	(1)
2019	Levante	1	(0)
2020–2021	Peña Deportiva	17	(1)
2021–2022	Águilas	4	(0)
2022	Peña Deportiva	18	(1)
2022–2023	Olot	29	(0)
2023–2024	Peña Deportiva	29	(1)
2024–2025	Badalona	30	(1)
2025–	Cornellà	10	(0)
- * Club domestic league appearances and goals as of 8 November 2025

Gonzalo Pereira Cejudo (born 14 February 1997), sometimes known simply as Gonzalo, is a Spanish footballer who plays for Tercera Federación club Cornellà as a central defender.

== Club career ==
Born in Barcelona, Catalonia, Pereira finished his formation with CF Damm. On 15 July 2016, he joined CE Sabadell FC and was assigned to the reserves in Tercera División.

In August 2017, Pereira moved to another reserve team, CF Reus Deportiu B also in the fourth level. He made his first-team debut on 19 August, coming on as a first-half substitute for injured Mikel Villanueva in a 0–2 away loss against UD Las Palmas.

Pereira was regularly utilized in the first team during the first half of the 2018–19 season, but the side was expelled by the LFP in January. On 20 February 2019, he was presented at CD Calahorra in Segunda División B.

On 18 March 2019, Pereira agreed to a pre-contract deal with Levante UD, effective as of 1 July; he was initially assigned to the B-team also in the third division. He made his first team – and La Liga – debut on 7 December, playing the last 13 minutes in a 2–4 home loss against Valencia CF.
