= Javi Llor =

Spanish footballer (born 1996)

Personal information
- Full name: Javier Llor Igualada
- Date of birth: 8 April 1996 (age 30)
- Place of birth: Alicante, Spain
- Height: 1.73 m (5 ft 8 in)
- Position: Midfielder

Team information
- Current team: Orihuela

Youth career
- Alicante
- 2014–2015: Elche

Senior career*
| Years | Team | Apps | (Gls) |
| 2014–2017 | Elche B | 79 | (11) |
| 2017 | Elche | 1 | (0) |
| 2017–2018 | Levante B | 18 | (0) |
| 2018–2019 | Ontinyent | 24 | (1) |
| 2019– | Orihuela | 5 | (0) |
- * Club domestic league appearances and goals as of 23:27, 17 June 2019 (UTC)

Javier 'Javi' Llor Igualada (born 3 March 1996) is a Spanish footballer who plays for Orihuela CF as a central midfielder.

== Club career ==
Born in Alicante, Valencian Community, Llor joined Elche CF's youth setup in 2014 after starting out at Alicante CF. He made his senior debut for the reserves on 31 August of that year, starting in a 0–1 away loss against CF Badalona in the Segunda División B.

Llor scored his first professional goal on 30 August 2015, netting the first in a 3–0 home win against CD Acero. On 14 April 2016, he signed a new two-year contract at the Estadio Manuel Martínez Valero.

Llor first appeared in competitive matches with the first team debut on 10 June 2017, coming on as a late substitute for Guillermo in a 0–2 Segunda División away loss to Real Oviedo. On 18 August he moved to another reserve team, Atlético Levante UD of Tercera División.

On 31 August 2018, Llor joined Ontinyent CF also in the third level. On 28 March 2019, after the club's dissolution, he left.

On 12 April 2019, Llor signed with division four side Orihuela CF.
