= Eliseo Falcón =

Spanish footballer

Eliseo
Personal information
- Full name: Eliseo Falcón Falcón
- Date of birth: 11 February 1997 (age 29)
- Place of birth: Seville, Spain
- Height: 1.83 m (6 ft 0 in)
- Position: Centre back

Team information
- Current team: Arenteiro
- Number: 4

Youth career
- Calavera
- 2012–2016: Sevilla

Senior career*
Years	Team	Apps	(Gls)
2016–2017	Sevilla C	30	(2)
2016	Sevilla B	2	(0)
2017–2019	Granada B	35	(0)
2019–2020	Levante B	19	(0)
2019	Levante	1	(0)
2020–2021	Sevilla B	9	(1)
2021	Marbella	16	(1)
2021–2022	Eldense	34	(4)
2022–2023	Cornellà	24	(3)
2023	Ceuta	2	(0)
2024–2025	Mérida	44	(2)
2025–	Arenteiro	31	(1)
- * Club domestic league appearances and goals as of 10 June 2026

Eliseo Falcón Falcón (born 11 February 1997), simply known as Eliseo, is a Spanish professional footballer who plays for Primera Federación club Arenteiro as a central defender.

== Club career ==
Born in Seville, Andalusia, Eliseo joined Sevilla FC's youth setup in 2012, from Calavera CF. On 2 December 2015 he signed his first professional contract, running until 2017.

Eliseo made his senior debut for the reserves on 1 May 2016, coming on as a late substitute in a 4–0 away win against UD Almería B in the Segunda División B championship. He made his professional debut on 12 November, replacing Yan Brice in a 1–0 Segunda División home win against the latter's first team.

On 10 July 2017 Eliseo moved to another reserve team, Granada CF B in the third division. On 16 July 2019, he joined fellow league team Atlético Levante UD after being sparingly used by the Nazarís.

Eliseo made his first team – and La Liga – debut on 7 December 2019, starting and being sent off in a 2–4 home loss against Valencia CF. The following 9 October, he returned to Sevilla and their B-team, still in the third tier.
