= Chema (footballer, born 1992) =

Spanish footballer

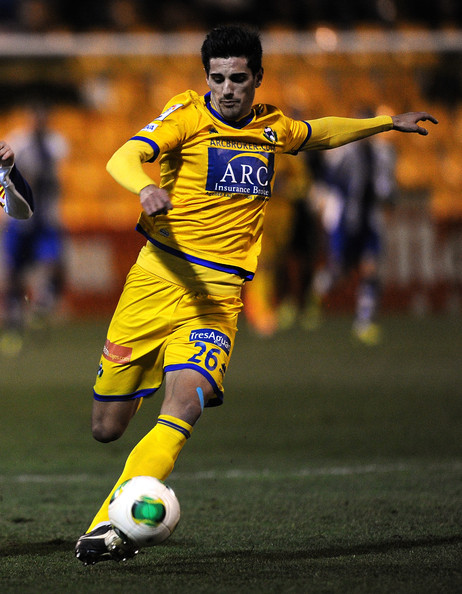
- Chema with Alcorcón in 2016

Personal information
- Full name: José Manuel Rodríguez Benito
- Date of birth: 3 March 1992 (age 34)
- Place of birth: Caudete, Spain
- Height: 1.89 m (6 ft 2 in)
- Position: Defender

Youth career
- EDM Caudete
- 2003–2007: Kelme
- 2007–2010: Elche

Senior career*
Years	Team	Apps	(Gls)
2010–2011	Elche B	32	(5)
2011–2012	Atlético Madrid C	18	(2)
2012–2013	Atlético Madrid B	2	(0)
2013–2014	Alcorcón B	11	(2)
2013–2016	Alcorcón	65	(6)
2016–2019	Levante	77	(6)
2019–2020	Nottingham Forest	8	(0)
2020–2022	Getafe	15	(0)
2022	→ Eibar (loan)	17	(1)
2022–2025	Eibar	18	(1)
2023–2024	→ Alcorcón (loan)	24	(1)
2025–2026	Racing Ferrol	13	(1)
- * Club domestic league appearances and goals as of 9 June 2026

José Manuel Rodríguez Benito (born 3 March 1992), known as Chema, is a Spanish professional footballer. Mainly a central defender, he can also play as a left-back.

== Club career ==
=== Early years ===
A product of Elche CF's youth system, Chema was born in Caudete, Province of Albacete, and he made his senior debut in 2010 with the reserves. In the following seasons he competed in the Tercera División and Segunda División B, representing Atlético Madrid's C and B teams.

=== Alcorcón ===
Chema signed with AD Alcorcón in January 2013, being initially assigned to the B side in the fourth division. He was promoted to the first team in August, making his competitive debut on 6 October by starting in a 0–0 away draw against SD Eibar in the Segunda División.

Chema scored his first professional goal on 30 March 2014, his team's only in the 3–1 away loss to Girona FC. On 9 July, he was definitely promoted to the main squad.

=== Levante ===
On 5 August 2016, Chema signed a four-year deal with Levante UD, still in the second tier. He contributed three goals in 33 appearances in his first season, helping the club to return to La Liga at the first attempt.

Chema's first match in the Spanish top flight took place on 21 August 2017, when he started a 1–0 home win over Villarreal CF. He scored his first goal in the competition exactly one month later, helping the hosts defeat Real Sociedad 3–0 with a spectacular 44th-minute strike from just outside the box.

=== Nottingham Forest ===
On 8 August 2019, Chema joined EFL Championship club Nottingham Forest on a two-year contract for an undisclosed fee. He made his official debut 19 days later, as a substitute in a 3–0 home win against Derby County in the second round of the EFL Cup.

=== Getafe and Eibar ===
Chema returned to Spain on 30 January 2020, after being sold to Getafe CF for an undisclosed fee. On 11 January 2022, he was loaned to second division side Eibar for the remainder of the season.

On 21 July 2022, Chema terminated his contract, and returned to Eibar on a three-year deal just hours later. On 12 August 2023, he returned to Alcorcón on a one-year loan.

== Career statistics ==
As of match played 23 May 2021

Appearances and goals by club, season and competition
Club	Season	League			National Cup		League Cup		Continental		Total	
Club	Season	Division	Apps	Goals	Apps	Goals	Apps	Goals	Apps	Goals	Apps	Goals
Atlético Madrid B	2012–13	Segunda División B	2	0	—		—		—		2	0
Alcorcón	2013–14	Segunda División	9	1	3	0	—		—		12	1
Alcorcón	2014–15	Segunda División	23	0	1	0	—		—		24	0
Alcorcón	2015–16	Segunda División	33	5	0	0	—		—		33	5
Alcorcón	Total		65	6	4	0	0	0	0	0	69	6
Levante	2016–17	Segunda División	33	3	0	0	—		—		33	3
Levante	2017–18	La Liga	25	1	2	0	—		—		27	1
Levante	2018–19	La Liga	19	2	2	0	—		—		21	2
Levante	Total		77	6	4	0	0	0	0	0	81	6
Nottingham Forest	2019–20	Championship	8	0	0	0	2	0	—		10	0
Getafe	2019–20	La Liga	4	0	0	0	—		0	0	4	0
Getafe	2020–21	La Liga	10	0	2	0	—		—		12	0
Getafe	Total		14	0	2	0	0	0	0	0	16	0
Career total			166	12	10	0	2	0	0	0	178	12
