= Nemanja Radoja =

Serbian footballer

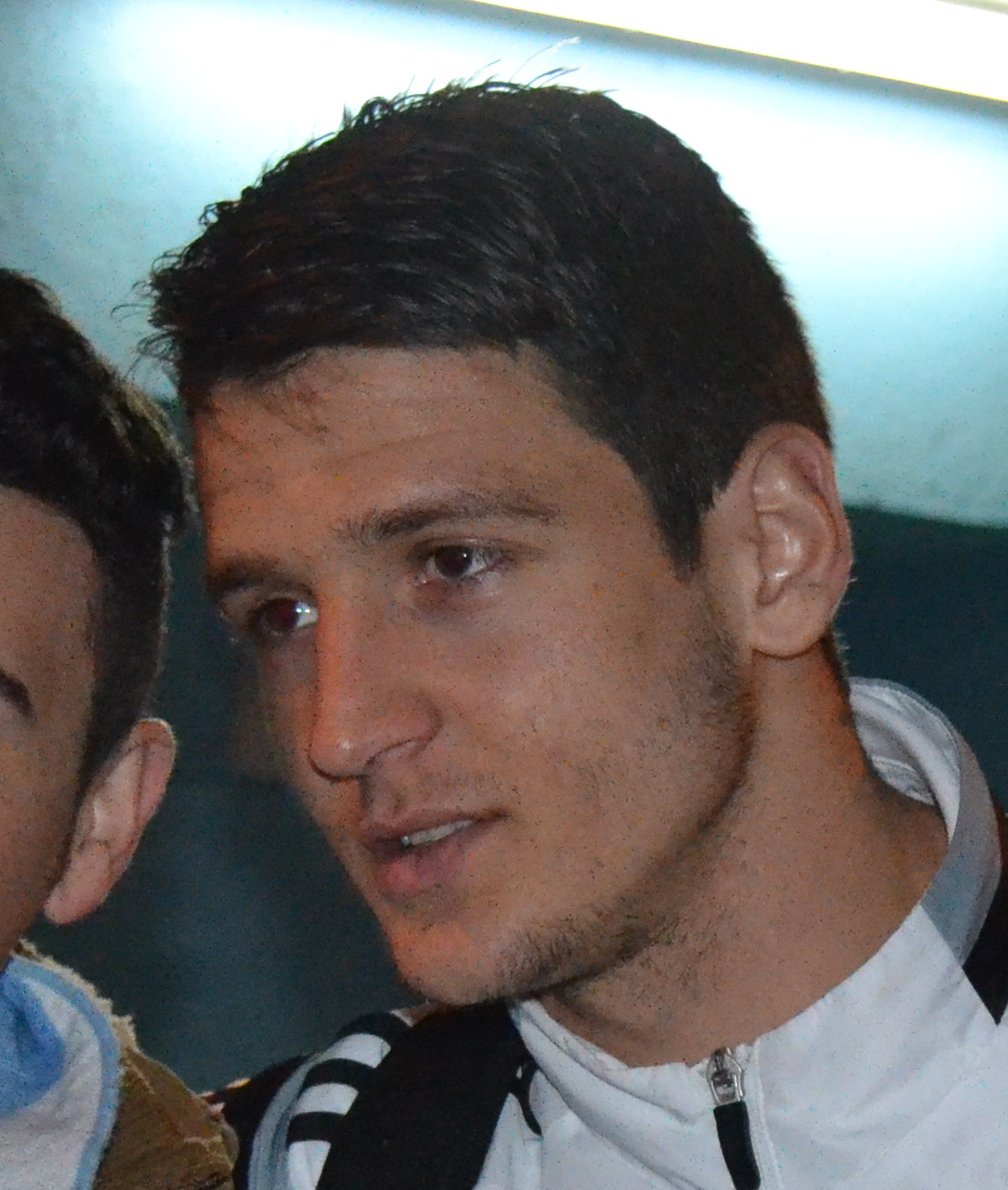
- Radoja in 2015

Personal information
- Full name: Nemanja Radoja
- Date of birth: 6 February 1993 (age 33)
- Place of birth: Novi Sad, FR Yugoslavia
- Height: 1.86 m (6 ft 1 in)
- Position: Defensive midfielder

Team information
- Current team: Iraklis
- Number: 8

Youth career
- Vojvodina

Senior career*
Years	Team	Apps	(Gls)
2011–2014	Vojvodina	48	(1)
2011	→ ČSK (loan)	11	(0)
2012	→ Cement (loan)	10	(1)
2014–2019	Celta	115	(1)
2019–2022	Levante	66	(1)
2023–2025	Sporting Kansas City	70	(1)
2026	Cultural Leonesa	8	(0)
2026–	Iraklis	3	(0)

International career
2011	Serbia U18	2	(0)
2011–2012	Serbia U19	9	(0)
2013–2015	Serbia U21	9	(0)
2016–2017	Serbia	2	(0)
- * Club domestic league appearances and goals as of 19 September 2026

Nemanja Radoja (Serbian Cyrillic: Немања Радоја, pronounced [nêmaɲa rǎdoja]; born 6 February 1993) is a Serbian professional footballer who plays as a defensive midfielder for Super League Greece club Iraklis.

== Club career ==
=== Vojvodina ===
Born in Novi Sad, Radoja grew up in neighboring Veternik, and graduated from Vojvodina's youth setup. Following the footsteps of his older brother, Stefan, he started training football. Radoja was promoted to the first team in summer 2011 but later moved on loan to third tier club ČSK Čelarevo. He signed a new five-year professional contract with the Vojvodina on 8 March 2012 before moving on loan to fellow third division club Cement Beočin.

Radoja played his first match as a professional on 18 August 2012, coming on as a late substitute in a 1–0 away victory against Spartak. He scored his first professional goal on 17 April 2013, netting FK Vojvodina's only one in a Serbian Cup semifinal 1–1 draw against OFK Beograd (2–1 on aggregate), thus taking the club to the finals.

Radoja played regularly for Voša in the 2012–13 campaign, appearing in 22 matches (16 starts, 1553 minutes of action) and helping his club to finish in the third position. He maintained his starting place in the following season, appearing in 25 matches, as well as being selected in the league's best XI.

=== Celta ===
In August 2014, Radoja signed a five-year contract with La Liga club Celta de Vigo. He made his debut for the club on 24 August, playing the last three minutes in a 3–1 home victory against Getafe.

Radoja did not make any appearance during the entire 2018–19 season after he expressed his desire to play in the Premier League and refused a contract renewal from Celta.

=== Levante ===
On 21 August 2019, Radoja signed three-year contract with another La Liga club Levante as a free agent.

=== Sporting Kansas City ===
Radoja signed for Major League Soccer club Sporting Kansas City on 26 October 2022. Following the 2025 season, Kansas City opted to release him from the club.

=== Cultural Leonesa ===
On 13 February 2026, Radoja returned to Spain and signed for Cultural Leonesa in Segunda División.

=== Iraklis ===
On 12 August 2026, Radoja signed for Iraklis on a free transfer.

== International career ==
Radoja played for Serbia under-18 and under-19 teams. He was a member of under-19's at the 2012 UEFA European Under-19 Football Championship, playing regularly. Radoja received his first call-up to the Serbian senior team for the 2018 FIFA World Cup qualification matches against Moldova and Austria in October 2016. He made his debut in a friendly match against Ukraine the same year on 15 November.

== Career statistics ==
=== Club ===
As of 20 October 2024

Appearances and goals by club, season, and competition
Club	Season	League			Cup		Continental		Total	
Club	Season	Division	Apps	Goals	Apps	Goals	Apps	Goals	Apps	Goals
ČSK (loan)	2011–12	League Vojvodina	11	0	0	0	—		11	0
Cement (loan)	2011–12	League Vojvodina	10	1	0	0	—		10	1
Vojvodina	2012–13	SuperLiga	22	1	5	1	—		27	2
Vojvodina	2013–14	SuperLiga	25	0	6	0	8 (Note: Appearances in UEFA Europa League Qualifying rounds)	0	39	0
Vojvodina	2014–15	SuperLiga	1	0	0	0	2	0	3	0
Vojvodina	Total		48	1	11	1	10	0	69	2
Celta	2014–15	La Liga	28	0	3	0	—		31	0
Celta	2015–16	La Liga	30	0	6	0	—		36	0
Celta	2016–17	La Liga	31	1	7	0	12 (Note: Appearances in UEFA Europa League)	0	50	1
Celta	2017–18	La Liga	26	0	3	0	—		29	0
Celta	2018–19	La Liga	0	0	0	0	—		0	0
Celta	Total		115	1	19	0	12	0	146	1
Levante	2019–20	La Liga	26	1	1	0	—		27	1
Levante	2020–21	La Liga	21	0	6	0	—		27	0
Levante	2021–22	La Liga	19	0	1	0	—		20	0
Levante	Total		66	1	8	0	—		74	1
Sporting KC	2023	MLS	29	0	1	0	—		30	0
Sporting KC	2024	MLS	25	1	3	0	2 (Note: Appearances in Leagues Cup)	0	30	1
Sporting KC	Total		54	1	4	0	2	0	60	1
Career total			304	5	42	1	24	0	370	6

=== International ===
Serbia
Year	Apps	Goals
2016	1	0
2017	1	0
Total	2	0

== Honours ==
Vojvodina

- Serbian Cup: 2013–14

Individual

- Serbian SuperLiga Team of the Season: 2013–14
