= 2007–08 FC Bayern Munich season =

108th season in existence of Bayern Munich

Bayern Munich
2007–08 season
- Chairman: Franz Beckenbauer
- Manager: Ottmar Hitzfeld
- Stadium: Allianz Arena
- Bundesliga: 1st
- DFB-Pokal: Winners
- DFB Ligapokal: Winners
- UEFA Cup: Semi-finals
- Top goalscorer: League: Luca Toni (24); All: Luca Toni (39)
- Highest home attendance: 69,000
- Lowest home attendance: 69,000
Home colours	Away colours	Third colours

Prior to the beginning of the 2007–08 season, Bayern Munich underwent a major restructuring of the team, releasing or retiring nine players while adding ten others to the squad, most notably Luca Toni and Franck Ribéry. The season started with Bayern winning the DFB-Ligapokal, followed by a shootout win in the DFB-Pokal against Wacker Burghausen on 6 August 2007. On the first day of the 2007–08 Bundesliga season, Bayern achieved a 3–0 victory over Hansa Rostock. As the season progressed, Bayern continued in first in the league table, eventually winning the championship. Bayern also won the 2007–08 DFB-Pokal, thereby completing the domestic treble. International success was thwarted by Zenit Saint Petersburg, however, when Bayern suffered a horrible 4–0 defeat in the second leg of the semi-final after a draw at home. The match was later alleged to have been fixed. The 2007–08 season was goalkeeper Oliver Kahn's last season with Bayern.

== Bundesliga ==
=== League table ===
Pos	Team	Pld	W	D	L	GF	GA	GD	Pts	Qualification or relegation
1	Bayern Munich (C)	34	22	10	2	68	21	+47	76	Qualification to Champions League group stage
2	Werder Bremen	34	20	6	8	75	45	+30	66	Qualification to Champions League group stage
3	Schalke 04	34	18	10	6	55	32	+23	64	Qualification to Champions League third qualifying round
4	Hamburger SV	34	14	12	8	47	26	+21	54	Qualification to UEFA Cup first round
5	VfL Wolfsburg	34	15	9	10	58	46	+12	54	Qualification to UEFA Cup first round

Source: www.dfb.de
Rules for classification: 1) points; 2) goal difference; 3) number of goals scored.
(C) Champions

=== Matches ===
Aug 11, 2007 1	Bayern Munich	3–0	Hansa Rostock	Munich
15:30	Toni 14'; Klose 66', 85'			Stadium: Allianz Arena; Attendance: 69,000; Referee: Markus Schmidt

Aug 18, 2007 2	Werder Bremen	0–4	Bayern Munich	Bremen
15:30			Ribéry 31' (pen.); Toni 51'; Altıntop 79'; Ottl 87'	Stadium: Weserstadion; Attendance: 42,100; Referee: Markus Merk

Aug 25, 2007 3	Bayern Munich	3–0	Hannover 96	Munich
15:30	Toni 28'; Van Bommel 69'; Altıntop 86'			Stadium: Allianz Arena; Attendance: 69,000; Referee: Thorsten Kinhöfer

Sep 2, 2007 4	Hamburger SV	1–1	Bayern Munich	Hamburg
17:00	Zidan 87'		Klose 70'	Stadium: Volksparkstadion; Attendance: 57,000; Referee: Florian Meyer

Sep 15, 2007 5	Bayern Munich	1–1	Schalke 04	Munich
15:30	Klose 54'		Rakitić 36'	Stadium: Allianz Arena; Attendance: 69,000; Referee: Herbert Fandel

Sep 23, 2007 6	Karlsruher SC	1–4	Bayern Munich	Karlsruhe
17:00	Porcello 52'		Toni 5'; Klose 20'; Altıntop 49'; Zé Roberto 75'	Stadium: Wildsparkstadion; Attendance: 30,702; Referee: Peter Gagelmann

Sep 26, 2007 7	Bayern Munich	5–0	Energie Cottbus	Munich
20:00	Klose 59', 75', 89'; Demichelis 63'; Toni 69'			Stadium: Allianz Arena; Attendance: 69,000; Referee: Michael Weiner

Sep 29, 2007 8	Bayer Leverkusen	0–1	Bayern Munich	Leverkusen
15:30			Toni 40'	Stadium: BayArena; Attendance: 22,500; Referee: Knut Kircher

Oct 7, 2007 9	Bayern Munich	3–0	1. FC Nürnberg	Munich
17:00	Toni 31', 81'; Zé Roberto 40'			Stadium: Allianz Arena; Attendance: 69,000; Referee: Babak Rafati

Oct 20, 2007 10	VfL Bochum	1–2	Bayern Munich	Bochum
15:30	Grote 11'		Ribéry 35'; Schweinsteiger 78'	Stadium: Ruhrstadion; Attendance: 31,328; Referee: Herbert Fandel

Oct 28, 2007 11	Borussia Dortmund	0–0	Bayern Munich	Dortmund
17:00				Stadium: Westfalenstadion; Attendance: 80,708; Referee: Markus Merk

Nov 3, 2007 12	Bayern Munich	0–0	Eintracht Frankfurt	Munich
15:30				Stadium: Allianz Arena; Attendance: 69,000; Referee: Florian Meyer

Nov 10, 2007 13	VfB Stuttgart	3–1	Bayern Munich	Stuttgart
15:30	Gómez 10', 42'; Baştürk 30'		Toni 86'	Stadium: Gottlieb-Daimler-Stadion; Attendance: 55,896; Referee: Thorsten Kinhöfer

Nov 24, 2007 14	Bayern Munich	2–1	VfL Wolfsburg	Munich
15:30	Klose 35'; Ribéry 50'		Dejagah 71'	Stadium: Allianz Arena; Attendance: 69,000; Referee: Knut Kircher

Dec 2, 2007 15	Arminia Bielefeld	0–1	Bayern Munich	Bielefeld
17:00			Ribéry 22'	Stadium: Schüco Arena; Attendance: 23,800; Referee: Michael Weiner

Dec 8, 2007 16	Bayern Munich	0–0	MSV Duisburg	Munich
15:30				Stadium: Allianz Arena; Attendance: 69,000; Referee: Markus Merk

Dec 15, 2007 17	Hertha BSC	0–0	Bayern Munich	Berlin
15:30				Stadium: Olympiastadion; Attendance: 74,220; Referee: Markus Merk

Feb 1, 2008 18	Hansa Rostock	1–2	Bayern Munich	Rostock
20:30	Kern 52'		Ribéry 11'; Toni 43'	Stadium: DKB-Arena; Attendance: 29,000; Referee: Florian Meyer

Feb 10, 2008 19	Bayern Munich	1–1	Werder Bremen	Munich
17:00	Zé Roberto 32'		Diego 6'	Stadium: Allianz Arena; Attendance: 69,000; Referee: Thorsten Kinhöfer

Feb 17, 2008 20	Hannover 96	0–3	Bayern Munich	Hanover
17:00			Toni 58', 64', 82'	Stadium: AWD-Arena; Attendance: 49,000; Referee: Markus Merk

Feb 24, 2008 21	Bayern Munich	1–1	Hamburger SV	Munich
17:00	Zé Roberto 66'		Olić 60'	Stadium: Allianz Arena; Attendance: 69,000; Referee: Lutz Wagner

Mar 1, 2008 22	Schalke 04	0–1	Bayern Munich	Gelsenkirchen
15:30			Klose 14'	Stadium: Veltins-Arena; Attendance: 61,482; Referee: Herbert Fandel

Mar 8, 2008 23	Bayern Munich	2–0	Karlsruher SC	Munich
15:30	Toni 41'; Ribéry 64'			Stadium: Allianz Arena; Attendance: 69,000; Referee: Jochen Drees

Mar 15, 2008 24	Energie Cottbus	2–0	Bayern Munich	Cottbus
15:30	Jelić 18', 38'			Stadium: Stadion der Freundschaft; Attendance: 22,746; Referee: Thorsten Kinhöfer

Mar 22, 2008 25	Bayern Munich	2–1	Bayer Leverkusen	Munich
15:30	Toni 17', 59'		Bulykin 83'	Stadium: Allianz Arena; Attendance: 69,000; Referee: Florian Meyer

Mar 29, 2008 26	1. FC Nürnberg	1–1	Bayern Munich	Nuremberg
15:30	Misimović 44'		Podolski 81'	Stadium: Easy Credit Stadion; Attendance: 46,780; Referee: Manuel Gräfe

Apr 6, 2008 27	Bayern Munich	3–1	VfL Bochum	Munich
17:00	Lúcio 31'; Ribéry 74' (pen.); Lell 88'		Azaouagh 4'	Stadium: Allianz Arena; Attendance: 69,000; Referee: Michael Weiner

Apr 13, 2008 28	Bayern Munich	5–0	Borussia Dortmund	Munich
17:00	Podolski 3'; Zé Roberto 8'; Toni 18', 22'; Ottl 67'			Stadium: Allianz Arena; Attendance: 69,000; Referee: Markus Merk

Apr 16, 2008 29	Eintracht Frankfurt	1–3	Bayern Munich	Frankfurt
20:00	Köhler 29'		Van Buyten 60'; Toni 74', 85'	Stadium: Waldstadion; Attendance: 51,500; Referee: Babak Rafati

Apr 27, 2008 30	Bayern Munich	4–1	VfB Stuttgart	Munich
17:00	Toni 8'; Van Bommel 55'; Ribéry 75', 76'		Silva 19'	Stadium: Allianz Arena; Attendance: 69,000; Referee: Florian Meyer

May 4, 2008 31	VfL Wolfsburg	0–0	Bayern Munich	Wolfsburg
17:00				Stadium: Volkswagen Arena; Attendance: 30,000; Referee: Herbert Fandel

May 7, 2008 32	Bayern Munich	2–0	Arminia Bielefeld	Munich
20:00	Ribéry 26'; Podolski 47'			Stadium: Allianz Arena; Attendance: 69,000; Referee: Jochen Drees

May 10, 2008 33	MSV Duisburg	2–3	Bayern Munich	Duisburg
15:30	Tararache 48'; Daun 54'		Ottl 3'; Podolski 18', 20'	Stadium: MSV-Arena; Attendance: 31,500; Referee: Michael Weiner

May 17, 2008 34	Bayern Munich	4–1	Hertha BSC	Munich
15:30	Toni 4', 27', 61'; Ribéry 32'		Domovchiyski 84'	Stadium: Allianz Arena; Attendance: 69,000; Referee: Markus Merk

== DFB-Pokal ==
6 August 2007 First round	Wacker Burghausen	1–1 (a.e.t.) (3–4 p)	Bayern Munich	Wacker Arena (Burghausen)
	Neubert 61'; Hertl (yellow card); Teinert (yellow card); Martins (yellow card)	Report	Klose 79'	Attendance: 11,582 (capacity); Referee: Peter Gagelmann (Bremen)
	Penalties
	Schultz (penalty missed); Neubert (penalty scored); Martins (penalty missed); Schmidt (penalty scored); Riemann (penalty scored); Palionis (penalty missed); Mayer (penalty missed)		(penalty scored) Ribéry; (penalty scored) Van Bommel; (penalty missed) Sosa; (penalty missed) Altıntop; (penalty scored) Lahm; (penalty missed) Demichelis; (penalty scored) Lell

31 October 2007 Second round	Bayern Munich	3–1	Borussia Mönchengladbach	Allianz Arena (Munich)
	Toni 47', 57', (yellow card); Klose 83'; Rensing (yellow card)	Report	Ndjeng 69'; Brouwers (yellow card); Paauwe (yellow card)	Attendance: 69,000 (capacity); Referee: Manuel Gräfe (Berlin)

29 January 2008 Third round	Wuppertaler SV Borussia	2–5	Bayern Munich	Veltins-Arena (Gelsenkirchen)
	Damm 26'; Saglik 29'; Wiwerink (yellow card); Jerat (yellow card)	Report	Klose 14', 27'; Van Buyten 50'; Toni 53'; Altıntop 88'; Kahn (yellow card); Van Bommel (yellow card)	Attendance: 61,482 (capacity); Referee: Michael Weiner (Giesen)

27 February 2008 Quarter-finals	Bayern Munich	1–0 (a.e.t.)	1860 Munich	Allianz Arena (Munich)
	Ribéry 120' (pen.); Lahm (yellow card); Kroos (yellow card); Ribéry (yellow card); Toni (red card) 2'	Report	Hoffmann (yellow card); Gebhart (yellow card); Schwarz (yellow card) (yellow-red card); Thorandt (yellow card) (yellow-red card)	Attendance: 69,000 (capacity); Referee: Peter Gagelmann (Bremen)

19 March 2008 Semi-finals	Bayern Munich	2–0	VfL Wolfsburg	Allianz Arena (Munich)
	Ribéry 60'; Klose 66'; Van Bommel (yellow card); Lúcio (yellow card)	Report	Costa (yellow card); Riether (yellow card)	Attendance: 62,000; Referee: Herbert Fandel (Kyllburg)

19 April 2008 Final	Borussia Dortmund	1–2 (a.e.t.)	Bayern Munich	Olympic Stadium, Berlin
20:00 (CEST)	Petrić 90+2'	Report	Toni 11', 103'	Attendance: 74,244 (capacity); Referee: Knut Kircher (Rottenburg)

== UEFA Cup ==
=== First round ===
20 September 2007	Bayern Munich (Germany)	1–0	(Portugal) Belenenses	Allianz Arena, Munich
19:00 (CET)	Toni 34'	http://www.uefa.com/competitions/uefacup/history/season=2008/round=15118/match=301432/report=ev.html	Costa (yellow card) 32'; José Pedro (yellow card) 68'	Attendance: 64,000; Referee: Stefan Johanesson (Sweden)

4 October 2007	Belenenses (Portugal)	0–2 (0–3 agg.)	(Germany) Bayern Munich	Estádio do Restelo, Lisbon
20:30 (CET)	Alvim (yellow card) 16'; Dević (yellow card) 47'	http://www.uefa.com/competitions/uefacup/history/season=2008/round=15118/match=301472/report=ev.html	Toni 59' (yellow card) 63'; Altıntop 76'	Attendance: 7,000; Referee: Jacek Granat (Poland)

=== Group stage ===
Pos	Team	Pld	W	D	L	GF	GA	GD	Pts	Qualification	BAY	BRA	BOL	ARI	RSB
1	(Germany) Bayern Munich	4	2	2	0	12	5	+7	8	Advance to knockout stage	—	—	2–2	6–0	—
2	(Portugal) Braga	4	1	3	0	5	3	+2	6	Advance to knockout stage	1–1	—	—	—	2–0
3	(England) Bolton Wanderers	4	1	3	0	5	4	+1	6	Advance to knockout stage	—	1–1	—	1–1	—
4	(Greece) Aris	4	1	2	1	5	8	−3	5		—	1–1	—	—	3–0
5	(Serbia) Red Star Belgrade	4	0	0	4	2	9	−7	0		2–3	—	0–1	—	—

25 October 2007	Red Star Belgrade (Serbia)	2–3	(Germany) Bayern Munich	Stadion Crvena Zvezda, Belgrade
21:15 (CET)	Koroman 16'; Milijaš 74', (yellow card) 75'; Molina (yellow card) 64'; Bajalica (yellow card) 76' (yellow-red card) 90+1'	http://www.uefa.com/competitions/uefacup/history/season=2008/round=15119/match=301620/report=ev.html	Klose 20', 86'; Kroos 90+4'; Lahm (yellow card) 58'; Schweinsteiger (yellow card) 83'	Attendance: 40,000; Referee: Matteo Trefoloni (Italy)

8 November 2007	Bayern Munich (Germany)	2–2	(England) Bolton Wanderers	Allianz Arena, Munich
19:00 (CET)	Podolski 30', 49'	http://www.uefa.com/competitions/uefacup/history/season=2008/round=15119/match=301636/report=ev.html	Gardner 8'; Davies (yellow card) 27' (goal) 82'; Braten (yellow card) 45'; Cid (yellow card) 62'; O'Brien (yellow card) 78'	Attendance: 66,000; Referee: Jaroslav Jara (Czech Republic)

29 November 2007	Braga (Portugal)	1–1	(Germany) Bayern Munich	Estádio AXA, Braga
21:00 (CET)	Linz (yellow card) 45', (goal) 66'; Brum (yellow card) 5'; Stélvio (yellow card) 54'; Madrid (yellow card) 72'	http://www.uefa.com/competitions/uefacup/history/season=2008/round=15119/match=301652/report=ev.html	Klose 47'; Kahn (yellow card) 45'; Van Bommel (yellow card) 75'; Toni (yellow card) 86'	Attendance: 10,000; Referee: Jonas Eriksson (Sweden)

19 December 2007	Bayern Munich (Germany)	6–0	(Greece) Aris	Allianz Arena, Munich
20:45 (CET)	Toni 25', 38', 64', 66'; Lell 78'; Lahm 81'; Van Bommel (yellow card) 15'; Ribéry (yellow card) 83'	http://www.uefa.com/competitions/uefacup/history/season=2008/round=15119/match=301673/report=ev.html	Vangjeli (yellow card) 33'; Nebegleras (yellow card) 47'; Chalkias (yellow card) 73'; Papadopoulos (yellow card) 83'	Attendance: 64,000; Referee: Alon Yefet (Israel)

=== Round of 32 ===
14 February 2008 First leg	Aberdeen (Scotland)	2–2	(Germany) Bayern Munich	Pittodrie Stadium, Aberdeen
19:00 (CET)	Walker 24'; Aluko 41'; Mair (yellow card) 54'	http://www.uefa.com/competitions/uefacup/history/season=2008/round=15120/match=301915/report=ev.html	Klose 29'; Altıntop (penalty missed) 55', 55'; Podolski (yellow card) 90'	Attendance: 20,047; Referee: Eduardo Iturralde González (Spain)

21 February 2008 Second leg	Bayern Munich (Germany)	5–1 (7–3 agg.)	(Scotland) Aberdeen	Allianz Arena, Munich
18:45 (CET)	Lúcio 12'; Van Buyten 36'; Podolski 71', 77'; Van Bommel 85'; Kroos (yellow card) 65'	http://www.uefa.com/competitions/uefacup/history/season=2008/round=15120/match=301931/report=ev.html	Lovell 83'; Maybury (yellow card) 11'; Walker (yellow card) 26'; Aluko (yellow card) 35'; Nicholson (yellow card) 42'; Mackie (yellow card) 57'	Attendance: 66,000; Referee: Robert Malek (Poland)

=== Round of 16 ===
6 March 2008 First leg	Anderlecht (Belgium)	0–5	(Germany) Bayern Munich	Constant Vanden Stock Stadium, Anderlecht
19:00 (CET)	Wasilewski (yellow card) 42' (yellow-red card) 43'; Gillet (yellow card) 65'	http://www.uefa.com/competitions/uefacup/history/season=2008/round=15121/match=301947/report=ev.html	Altıntop 9'; Toni (yellow card) 43', (goal) 45+1'; Podolski 57'; Klose 67'; Ribéry 86'; Sosa (yellow card) 68'	Attendance: 21,500; Referee: Olegário Benquerença (Portugal)

12 March 2008 Second leg	Bayern Munich (Germany)	1–2 (6–2 agg.)	(Belgium) Anderlecht	Allianz Arena, Munich
20:45 (CET)	Lúcio 9'	http://www.uefa.com/competitions/uefacup/history/season=2008/round=15121/match=301955/report=ev.html	Akin 20'; Yakovenko 35', (yellow card) 35'; Juhász (yellow card) 7'; Deschacht (yellow card) 52'; Boussoufa (yellow card) 90+3'	Attendance: 63,000; Referee: Terje Hauge (Norway)

=== Quarter-finals ===
3 April 2008 First leg	Bayern Munich (Germany)	1–1	(Spain) Getafe	Allianz Arena, Munich
20:45 (CET)	Toni (yellow card) 5' (goal) 26'	http://www.uefa.com/competitions/uefacup/history/season=2008/round=15122/match=301965/report=ev.html	Contra 90'; Mario (yellow card) 4'; Tena (yellow card) 5'; Granero (yellow card) 34'; De la Red (yellow card) 90+3'	Attendance: 62,000; Referee: Howard Webb (England)

10 April 2008 Second leg	Getafe (Spain)	3–3 (a.e.t.) (4–4 agg.)	(Germany) Bayern Munich	Coliseum Alfonso Pérez, Getafe
20:45 (CET)	Contra 44'; Casquero 91'; Braulio 93'; De la Red (red card) 6'; Belenguer (yellow card) 120'	http://www.uefa.com/competitions/uefacup/history/season=2008/round=15122/match=301969/report=ev.html	Ribéry 89'; Toni (yellow card) 104' (goal) 115', 120'; Lell (yellow card) 22'; Lahm (yellow card) 37'; Podolski (yellow card) 116'	Attendance: 16,000; Referee: Massimo Busacca (Switzerland)

=== Semi-finals ===
24 April 2008 First leg	Bayern Munich (Germany)	1–1	(Russia) Zenit Saint Petersburg	Allianz Arena, Munich
20:45 (CET)	Ribéry (penalty missed) 18', 18'	Report	Lúcio 60' (o.g.); Ricksen (yellow card) 17'; Fayzulin (yellow card) 28'; Šírl (yellow card) 75'; Arshavin (yellow card) 79'	Attendance: 66,000; Referee: Ľuboš Micheľ (Slovakia)

1 May 2008 Second leg	Zenit Saint Petersburg (Russia)	4–0 (5–1 agg.)	(Germany) Bayern Munich	Petrovsky Stadium, Saint Petersburg
18:30 (CET)	Pogrebnyak 4', 73' (yellow card) 76'; Zyryanov 39'; Fayzulin 54'	Report	Toni (yellow card) 67'; Lell (yellow card) 81'	Attendance: 21,735; Referee: Tom Henning Øvrebø (Norway)

== Friendly ==
1 July 2007	Bayern Munich	2–1	São Paulo	Hong Kong Stadium (Hong Kong)
	Klose 61'; Altıntop 76'	(Report)	Marcel 19'; Carlinhos (yellow card)	Attendance: 40,000 (capacity); Referee: Mike Riley (England)

6 July 2007	FT Gern	0–18	Bayern Munich	Dante Stadium (Munich)
		(Report)	Sosa 7', 19'; Klose 11', 12', 34', 59'; Demichelis 14', 24'; Toni 18' (pen.), 33'; Van Bommel 48'; Pasta 52' (o.g.); Ribéry 58', 68'; Lahm 65'; Hummels 68', 84'; Wagner 82'	Attendance: 10,000

8 July 2007	Fan club 13 Höslwanger	0–13	Bayern Munich	Sportpark Bernauer Straße Am Sportplatz (Chiemsee)
		(Report)	Toni; Sosa; Fürstner; Zé Roberto; Wagner; Ribéry; Klose; Hummels	Attendance: 3,000

11 July 2007	FC Schaffhausen	0–4	FC Bayern Munich	Stadion Breite (Schaffhausen)
	Schlauri (yellow card)	(Report)	Zé Roberto 37'; Toni 40' 63'; Klose 51'	Attendance: 7,300 (capacity)

15 July 2007	FC 07 Albstadt	0–13	FC Bayern Munich	Albstadion (Albstadt)
		(Report)	Altıntop 31', 36'; Wagner 33', 57'; Schweinsteiger 37', 78'; Jansen 50'; Van Buyten 67', 72'; Demichelis 75', 89'; Hummels 80'; Zé Roberto 87'	Attendance: 10,200 (capacity)

18 July 2007	Borussia Mönchengladbach	2–1	FC Bayern Munich	Borussia Park (Mönchengladbach)
	Rösler 6'; Polanski 53' (pen.); Svärd (yellow card); Polanski (yellow card)	(Report)	Schweinsteiger 29'; Hummels (yellow card)	Attendance: 45,351; Referee: Seemann (Essen)

== Player statistics ==
No.	Pos	Nat	Player	Total		Bundesliga		UEFA Cup		DFB-Pokal		DFL-Ligapokal	
No.	Pos	Nat	Player	Apps	Goals	Apps	Goals	Apps	Goals	Apps	Goals	Apps	Goals
1	GK	(Germany) GER	Oliver Kahn (captain)	42	0	26	0	9	0	5	0	2	0
22	GK	(Germany) GER	Michael Rensing	18	0	10	0	6	0	1	0	1	0
29	GK	(Germany) GER	Bernd Dreher	0	0	0	0	0	0	0	0	0	0
2	DF	(France) FRA	Willy Sagnol	17	0	9	0	5	0	3	0	0	0
3	DF	(Brazil) BRA	Lúcio	46	3	24	1	13	2	6	0	3	0
5	DF	(Belgium) BEL	Daniel Van Buyten	26	3	19	1	3	1	3	1	1	0
6	DF	(Argentina) ARG	Martín Demichelis	44	1	28	1	10	0	4	0	2	0
21	DF	(Germany) GER	Philipp Lahm	40	1	22	0	10	1	5	0	3	0
23	DF	(Germany) GER	Marcell Jansen	33	0	17	0	10	0	3	0	3	0
25	DF	(France) FRA	Valérien Ismaël	0	0	0	0	0	0	0	0	0	0
30	DF	(Germany) GER	Christian Lell	46	2	28	1	11	1	4	0	3	0
32	DF	(Germany) GER	Mats Hummels	0	0	0	0	0	0	0	0	0	0
35	DF	(Brazil) BRA	Breno	2	0	1	0	1	0	0	0	0	0
7	MF	(France) FRA	Franck Ribéry	46	19	28	11	11	3	5	2	2	3
8	MF	(Turkey) TUR	Hamit Altıntop	40	8	23	3	9	3	5	1	3	1
15	MF	(Brazil) BRA	Zé Roberto	49	5	30	5	10	0	6	0	3	0
16	MF	(Germany) GER	Andreas Ottl	32	3	19	3	7	0	3	0	3	0
17	MF	(Netherlands) NED	Mark van Bommel	48	3	27	2	13	1	6	0	2	0
20	MF	(Argentina) ARG	José Sosa	25	0	15	0	6	0	3	0	1	0
31	MF	(Germany) GER	Bastian Schweinsteiger	48	2	30	1	12	0	4	0	2	1
36	MF	(Germany) GER	Stephan Fürstner	0	0	0	0	0	0	0	0	0	0
39	MF	(Germany) GER	Toni Kroos	20	1	12	0	6	1	2	0	0	0
9	FW	(Italy) ITA	Luca Toni	46	39	31	24	11	10	4	5	0	0
11	FW	(Germany) GER	Lukas Podolski	41	10	25	5	12	5	4	0	0	0
18	FW	(Germany) GER	Miroslav Klose	46	21	27	10	11	5	6	5	2	1
19	FW	(Germany) GER	Jan Schlaudraff	14	0	8	0	6	0	0	0	0	0
34	FW	(Germany) GER	Sandro Wagner	8	1	4	0	1	0	0	0	3	1
Players sold or loaned out during the summer transfer market:
14	MF	(Paraguay) PAR	Julio dos Santos	1	0	0	0	0	0	0	0	1	0

As of August 2008

== Transfers ==
=== In ===
Note: Flags indicate national team as defined under FIFA eligibility rules; some limited exceptions apply. Players may hold more than one non-FIFA nationality.

No.	Pos.	Nation	Player
7	MF	FRA	Franck Ribéry (from Marseille, €26M)
8	MF	TUR	Hamit Altıntop (from Schalke 04, free transfer)
9	FW	ITA	Luca Toni (from Fiorentina, €11M)
15	MF	BRA	Zé Roberto (from Santos, €9.5M)
18	FW	GER	Miroslav Klose (from Werder Bremen, €15M)
19	FW	GER	Jan Schlaudraff (From Alemannia Aachen, €3.2M)

No.	Pos.	Nation	Player
20	MF	ARG	José Sosa (from Estudiantes La Plata, €6M)
23	DF	GER	Marcell Jansen (From Borussia Mönchengladbach, €10M )
34	FW	GER	Sandro Wagner (promoted from Junior Team squad)
35	DF	BRA	Breno (From São Paulo, €12M )
39	MF	GER	Toni Kroos (promoted from Junior Team squad)

=== Out ===
Note: Flags indicate national team as defined under FIFA eligibility rules; some limited exceptions apply. Players may hold more than one non-FIFA nationality.

No.	Pos.	Nation	Player
7	MF	GER	Mehmet Scholl (retired)
8	MF	IRI	Ali Karimi (to Qatar SC, free transfer)
10	FW	NED	Roy Makaay (to Feyenoord, undisclosed)
14	FW	PER	Claudio Pizarro (to Chelsea, free transfer)
14	MF	PAR	Julio dos Santos (on loan to Almería)

No.	Pos.	Nation	Player
18	DF	GER	Andreas Görlitz (on loan to Karlsruher SC)
20	MF	BIH	Hasan Salihamidžić (to Juventus, free transfer)
23	MF	ENG	Owen Hargreaves (to Manchester United, €17M)
25	DF	FRA	Valérien Ismaël (to Hannover 96 in January 2008)
