= Joseph Epping =

German Jesuit astronomer and Assyriologist

Joseph Epping (1 December 1835 – 22 August 1894) was a German Jesuit astronomer and Assyriologist.

== Life ==
Joseph Epping was born at Neuenkirchen near the Rhine in Westphalia on 1 December 1835. His parents died while he was very young, and he owed his early education to relations. After completing the usual Gymnasium at Rheine and at Münster, he matriculated at the academy in Münster, where he devoted himself particularly to mathematics.

In 1859 he entered the novitiate of the Society of Jesus in Münster and after his philosophical studies was appointed professor of mathematics and astronomy at Maria-Laach. He spent the years from 1867 to 1871 in the study of theology and was ordained priest in 1870.

Gabriel García Moreno, President of Ecuador, had petitioned the General of the Jesuits in the early seventies for members of the Society to form the faculty of the Polytechnicum in Quito, which he had recently founded. A number of German Jesuits responded to the call, among them Epping, who set out in June, 1872, for Quito to become professor of mathematics. He learned Spanish and wrote a textbook of geometry.

The political disturbances which followed the assassination of Moreno (6 August 1875) made it necessary for the Jesuits to return to Europe, and Epping arrived in the Netherlands in the fall of 1876. He spent the remaining years of his life at Blijenbeck, and later at Exaeten, teaching astronomy and mathematics, devoting his leisure to research and literary work.

He died at Exaeten, in the Netherlands, on 22 August 1894

== Works ==
Epping's first published volume, Der Kreislauf im Kosmos, appeared in 1882. It was an exposition and critique of the Kant–Laplace nebular hypothesis; and a refutation of the pantheistic and materialistic conclusions which had been drawn from it.

His most important work, however, was begun in collaboration with Johann Strassmaier who, in connection with his own studies in Assyriology, had induced him to undertake a mathematical investigation of the Babylonian astronomical observations and tables. After considerable labour the key was found. He discovered the table of differences for the new moon in one of the tablets, and identified Guttu with Mars, Sakku with Saturn, and Te-ut with Jupiter (Epping and Strassmaier in Stimmen aus Maria-Laach, vol. 21, pp. 277–292).

Eight years later he published Astronomisches aus Babylon oder das Wissen der Chaldäer über den gestirnten Himmel (Freiburg im Breisgau, 1889). This work was of importance both from the standpoint of astronomy and chronology. It contains an exposition of the astronomy of the ancient Babylonians, worked out from their Ephemerides of the moon and the planets. This was supplemented by Die babylonische Berechnung des Neumondes (Stimmen aus Maria-Laach, Vol. XXXIX, pp. 229–240). He was also the author of a number of articles in the Zeitschrift für Assyriologie.
