= Jürgen Coße =

German politician (born 1969)

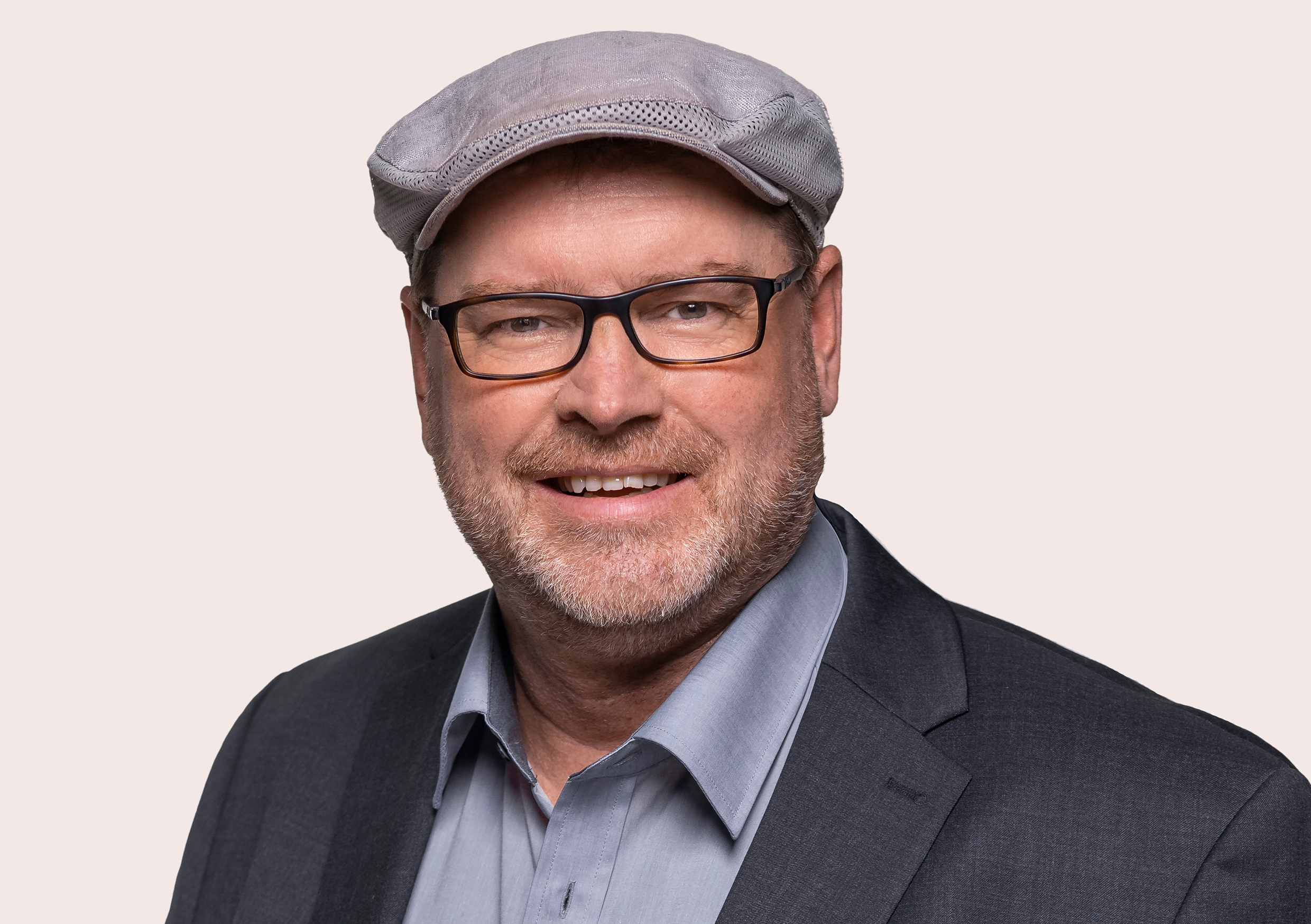

Member of the Bundestag
- Incumbent
- Assumed office 2021

Personal details
- Born: 16 August 1969 (age 56) Neuenkirchen, Westphalia, West Germany (now Germany)
- Party: SPD

Jürgen Coße (born 16 August 1969) is a German politician of the Social Democratic Party (SPD), who has served as a member of the Bundestag from 2016 to 2017 and again since 2021.

== Political career ==
In parliament, Coße has been serving on the Committee on Foreign Affairs, the Subcommittee on the United Nations, International Organizations and Civil Crisis Prevention, and the Subcommittee on Global Health.

In addition to his committee assignments, Coße is part of the German Parliamentary Friendship Group for Relations with the Central African States and the German Parliamentary Friendship Group for Relations with the States of East Africa.

In the 2021, federal election, Coße once again ran unsuccessfully as a candidate for the SPD in the Steinfurt III constituency and was once again defeated by his competitor, the incumbent Federal Research Minister Anja Karliczek, with 31.1% of the first votes, who won the constituency for the third time with 34.0% of the first votes. However, due to his party's improved second vote result, Coße entered the 20th German Bundestag as a member of the SPD state list.
