= 2008–09 FC Bayern Munich season =

109th season in existence of Bayern Munich

Bayern Munich
2008–09 season
- Chairman: Franz Beckenbauer
- Manager: Jürgen Klinsmann (until 27 April 2009); Jupp Heynckes (caretaker)
- Stadium: Allianz Arena
- Bundesliga: 2nd
- DFB-Pokal: Quarter-finals
- UEFA Champions League: Quarter-finals
- Top goalscorer: League: Luca Toni (14); All: Miroslav Klose (20)
- Highest home attendance: 69,000
- Lowest home attendance: 69,000
- Biggest win: Bayern 7–1 Sporting CP
- Biggest defeat: Wolfsburg 5–1 Bayern; Barcelona 4–0 Bayern
Home colours	Away colours	Third colours

FC Bayern Munich made few squad changes for the 2008–09 season. With captain Oliver Kahn retiring and coach Ottmar Hitzfeld leaving to coach the Swiss national team, the team leaders had to be replaced. Jürgen Klinsmann was appointed as new coach as announced in December 2007. In August 2008, Klinsmann announced that Mark van Bommel would succeed Kahn as captain. Klinsmann was sacked in April 2009 when the club officials saw the club's minimum aim, qualification for the Champions League, in jeopardy after a string of games in which Bayern underperformed. Jupp Heynckes was appointed as caretaker manager.

== Course of the season ==
=== Preseason ===
With Ottmar Hitzfeld not available for another season, Bayern announced in December 2007 that they had signed former Bayern player and recent manager of the Germany national team Jürgen Klinsmann as head coach for the 2008–09 season. Oliver Kahn had, even before the 2007–08 season, announced that this would be his last season as a player. He was replaced by former reserve goalkeeper Michael Rensing, whose spot was taken by the newly signed Hans-Jörg Butt. Second reserve goalkeeper Bernd Dreher had also retired and was replaced by the amateur Thomas Kraft. Reserve strikers Jan Schlaudraff (to Hannover 96) and Sandro Wagner (to MSV Duisburg) left the club, but found no replacements. After being loaned out for two seasons, midfielder Julio dos Santos left the club for good. The only field player added to the squad was Tim Borowski, who came from Werder Bremen. All changes were made before UEFA Euro 2008. After the tournament, Bayern announced that they would make no further squad changes.

Training for the 2008–09 season began on 30 June 2008. Several players were still on vacation due to Euro 2008, while Franck Ribéry was missing due to injury. After a 45-minute in-training test against their own amateurs, the first official test was won at SV Lippstadt 7–1. Further tests on 19 July in Nördlingen and 20 July in Amberg were won 8–0 and 11–1. The T-Home Supercup against Borussia Dortmund marked the first loss of the season (1–2). After a goalless draw at 1. FC Köln on 26 July Bayern travelled to Japan for a guestplay at Urawa Red Diamonds, beating the hosts 4–2. On 5 August, Bayern hosted Internazionale in the Franz Beckenbauer Cup for the final test before the regular season, losing 1–0.

=== August ===
On 8 August, Klinsmann announced that Mark van Bommel would succeed Oliver Kahn as captain. Two days later, in the first cup match, third league club Rot-Weiß Erfurt provided unexpected difficulties for the Bayern as the club went to catch up on a Bayern lead three times, before having to concede to Bayern's fourth goal. In the opening game of the Bundesliga season, Bayern hosted Hamburger SV. As Hamburg caught up from two goals behind, the game finished 2–2, leaving Hamburg yet unbeaten at the Allianz Arena. After another draw at Dortmund, the succeeding week brought two squad changes for Munich, as Marcell Jansen left the club for Hamburg while Massimo Oddo was loaned out from Milan. The first league victory followed against Berlin, 4–1.

=== September ===
Victories at 1. FC Köln in the Bundesliga and Steaua București in the Champions League were followed up with a 2–5 loss at home against rival Werder Bremen and another away at Hannover 96 (0–1) on 27 September. Three days later, Bayern were held to 1–1 draw at home by Lyon in Champions League group play.

=== October ===
On 4 October, Bayern drew level with VfL Bochum, despite leading 3–1 with just seven minutes left in regulation; goals in the 84th and 85th minutes, however, saw Marcel Koller's men leave the Allianz with a point. A few days later, Bayern lost a friendly at FC Ingolstadt but proceeded to win all other games in the month, including the Champions League home game against Fiorentina.

=== November ===
After a victory at home against Arminia Bielefeld Bayern drew level in the Champions League at Fiorentina on 1 November. The following victory against Steaua București on 25 November qualified Bayern for the single elimination stage. In the Bundesliga, away matches at Schalke 04 and Borussia Mönchengladbach followed; while Bayern defeated rival Schalke, the club drew at Mönchengladbach, for the third time this season not winning against them, despite having led by two goals. The games at home against Energie Cottbus and away at Bayer Leverkusen were also won.

=== December / January ===
On the 16th Bundesliga matchday, Bayern defeated Bundesliga leaders 1899 Hoffenheim, thus coming very close to the top of the standings. The final match of the Champions League group stage was also won at Lyon, completing Bayern's best performance in the group stage. A draw at VfB Stuttgart was Bayern's final game before the winter break. Coincidentally Stuttgart was also Bayern's first opponent after the break. While Bayern won this cup game 5–1 away, the first league match was lost at Hamburger SV, 0–1.

=== February ===
After winning at home against Borussia Dortmund, Bayern lost their next two games at Hertha BSC, that thereby took the lead in the league, and at home against newly promoted 1. FC Köln. A 5–0 victory in the Champions League at Sporting CP was the final game of the month.

=== March ===
After a draw in the league at Werder Bremen, Bayern was eliminated from the DFB-Pokal by Bayer Leverkusen. Munich won all other games in the month, including a 7–1 in the second leg against Sporting CP, thus achieving a record aggregate of 12–1.

=== April ===
After 5–1 defeat in the league at VfL Wolfsburg, a direct rival for the championship, Bayern suffered another severe loss (4–0) at the hands of Barcelona. Bayern held Barcelona to a draw in the second leg a week later but was eliminated from the competition nevertheless. In the Bundesliga, Munich managed to win against underdogs Eintracht Frankfurt and Arminia Bielefeld, but a home defeat at the hands of Schalke 04 led to the dismissal of coach Jürgen Klinsmann. The club appointed Jupp Heynckes as caretaker coach and Hermann Gerland as assistant caretaker coach.

=== May ===
Bayern won its first three games under Heynckes as coach, defeating Borussia Mönchengladbach, Energie Cottbus and Bayer Leverkusen. A draw at 1899 Hoffenheim led to a delicate situation before the last game, where second-place Bayern hosted third-place VfB Stuttgart. While the winner of the match would be qualified for the Champions League, and even win the championship if VfL Wolfsburg lost, the loser would likely fall to fourth position, outside of the Champions League spots. As fourth-place Hertha BSC lost and Wolfsburg won, the game eventually just decided that Bayern would go to the Champions League directly while Stuttgart would go to the qualification. The season concluded with four friendly games at Kaufbeuren, Eichstätt, 1. FC Magdeburg, and Fortuna Sittard, all won by Munich.

== Bundesliga ==
Bayern hosted Hamburger SV in the opener of the 46th Bundesliga season on 15 August 2008. On the last day of play, on 23 May 2009, Bayern defeated VfB Stuttgart to finish second in the league. The second place qualified Bayern for the 2009–10 Champions League.

=== Matches ===
1	Bayern Munich	2–2	Hamburger SV
	Schweinsteiger 12'; Podolski 16' (pen.)		Guerrero 25'; Trochowski 57' (pen.)

2	Borussia Dortmund	1–1	Bayern Munich
	Błaszczykowski 8'		Borowski 74'

3	Bayern Munich	4–1	Hertha BSC
	Toni 12'; Lahm 54'; Schweinsteiger 56' (pen.); Klose 70' (pen.)		Pantelić 84'

4	1. FC Köln	0–3	Bayern Munich
			Toni 53', 60'; Podolski 90+1'

5	Bayern Munich	2–5	Werder Bremen
	Borowski 71', 85'		Rosenberg 30', 67'; Naldo 45'; Özil 54'; Pizarro 59'

6	Hannover 96	1–0	Bayern Munich
	Huszti 23'

7	Bayern Munich	3–3	VfL Bochum
	Van Buyten 16'; Zé Roberto 45', 68'		Kaloğlu 29'; Dabrowski 84'; Grote 85'

8	Karlsruher SC	0–1	Bayern Munich
			Klose 86'

9	Bayern Munich	4–2	VfL Wolfsburg
	Ribéry 41'; Van Bommel 53'; Borowski 63'; Schweinsteiger 80'		Grafite 31' (pen.); Džeko 33'

10	Eintracht Frankfurt	1–2	Bayern Munich
	Demichelis 55' (o.g.)		Klose 65'; Ribéry 70'

11	Bayern Munich	3–1	Arminia Bielefeld
	Klose 25'; Ribéry 77'; Podolski 84' (pen.)		Wichniarek 30' (pen.)

12	Schalke 04	1–2	Bayern Munich
	Farfán 5'		Toni 3'; Ribéry 31'

13	Mönchengladbach	2–2	Bayern Munich
	Friend 78'; Bradley 81'		Toni 21'; Ribéry 65' (pen.)

14	Bayern Munich	4–1	Energie Cottbus
	Ribéry 29'; Demichelis 38'; Klose 55'; Toni 59'		Skela 25'

15	Bayer Leverkusen	0–2	Bayern Munich
			Toni 59'; Klose 82'

16	Bayern Munich	2–1	1899 Hoffenheim
	Lahm 60'; Toni 90+2'		Ibišević 49'

17	VfB Stuttgart	2–2	Bayern Munich
	Khedira 45', 90+2'		Borowski 48'; Toni 66'

18	Hamburger SV	1–0	Bayern Munich
	Petrić 44'

19	Bayern Munich	3–1	Borussia Dortmund
	Zé Roberto 24'; Klose 87', 90'		Valdez 2'

20	Hertha BSC	2–1	Bayern Munich
	Voronin 38', 77'		Klose 61'

21	Bayern Munich	1–2	1. FC Köln
	Van Buyten 84'		Ehret 22'; Brosinski 34'

22	Werder Bremen	0–0	Bayern Munich

23	Bayern Munich	5–1	Hannover 96
	Van Buyten 21'; Klose 25'; Altıntop 34'; Podolski 73'; Demichelis 89'		Štajner 15'

24	VfL Bochum	0–3	Bayern Munich
			Zé Roberto 32'; Lahm 60'; Demichelis 90'

25	Bayern Munich	1–0	Karlsruher SC
	Sosa 34'

26	VfL Wolfsburg	5–1	Bayern Munich
	Gentner 44'; Džeko 63', 66'; Grafite 74', 77'		Toni 45'

27	Bayern Munich	4–0	Eintracht Frankfurt
	Ribéry 3'; Toni 17'; Lúcio 36'; Schweinsteiger 48'

28	Arminia Bielefeld	0–1	Bayern Munich
			Toni 64'

29	Bayern Munich	0–1	Schalke 04
			Halil Altıntop 21'

30	Bayern Munich	2–1	Mönchengladbach
	Schweinsteiger 33'; Altıntop 42'		Daems 38' (pen.)

31	Energie Cottbus	1–3	Bayern Munich
	Iliev 44'		Sosa 23'; Demichelis 62'; Podolski 66'

32	Bayern Munich	3–0	Bayer Leverkusen
	Toni 47'; Ribéry 59'; Podolski 71'

33	1899 Hoffenheim	2–2	Bayern Munich
	Ba 21'; Carlos Eduardo 28'		Ribéry 16'; Toni 44'

34	Bayern Munich	2–1	VfB Stuttgart
	Boulahrouz 16' (o.g.); Van Bommel 60'		Gómez 63'

== DFB-Pokal ==
In the first round of the DFB-Pokal, Bayern faced Rot-Weiß Erfurt. The east Germans from the third tier were able to equalize three times before finally succumbing to Bayern. A victory at home against second-tier 1. FC Nürnberg followed. In the third round, Bayern managed one of their best performances of the season, winning 5–1 at VfB Stuttgart, but they lost in the next round to Bayer Leverkusen.

10 August 2008 First round	Rot-Weiß Erfurt	3–4	Bayern Munich	Steigerwaldstadion, Erfurt
20:30 (CEST)	Cannizzaro 22'; Bunjaku 47', 67'; Schnetzler (yellow card); Cinaz (yellow card)	(Report)	Lahm 6'; Podolski 23'; Klose 57'; Kroos 80'; Van Bommel (yellow card); Podolski (yellow card)	Attendance: 24,500 (capacity); Referee: Florian Meyer (Burgdorf)

24 September 2008 Second round	Bayern Munich	2–0	1. FC Nürnberg	Allianz Arena, Munich
20:30 (CEST)	Klose 7'; Borowski 68'	(Report)		Attendance: 65,000; Referee: Manuel Gräfe (Berlin)

27 January 2009 Third round	VfB Stuttgart	1–5	Bayern Munich	Mercedes-Benz Arena, Stuttgart
20:30 (CET)	Gómez 85'; Baştürk (yellow card)	(Report)	Schweinsteiger 14', 55' (pen.); Ribéry 16' (penalty missed) 21'; Toni 43'; Zé Roberto 59'; Demichelis (yellow card); Toni (yellow card); Ribéry (yellow card)	Attendance: 55,500 (capacity); Referee: Herbert Fandel (Kyllburg)

4 March 2009 Quarter-finals	Bayer Leverkusen	4–2	Bayern Munich	LTU Arena, Düsseldorf
20:30 (CET)	Barnetta 54'; Vidal 61'; Helmes 70'; Kießling 90+2'; Kroos (yellow card); Rolfes (yellow card)	(Report)	Lúcio 72'; Klose 74'; Ottl (yellow card); Rensing (yellow card)	Attendance: 50,500 (capacity); Referee: Florian Meyer (Burgdorf)

== Champions League ==
Bayern's Champions League season started on 17 September at Steaua București. The other group rivals were Lyon and Fiorentina. They finished the group stage undefeated in first place and eliminated Sporting CP via a record aggregate margin in the first knockout round, but then fell to Barcelona in the quarter-final. Club officials spoke of a "massive humiliation" and being "taken apart" after the 0–4 in the first leg which Bayern played without its top defender Philipp Lahm.

=== Group stage ===
Pos	Team	Pld	W	D	L	GF	GA	GD	Pts	Qualification	BAY	LYO	FIO	STE
1	(Germany) Bayern Munich	6	4	2	0	12	4	+8	14	Advance to knockout phase	—	1–1	3–0	3–0
2	(France) Lyon	6	3	2	1	14	10	+4	11	Advance to knockout phase	2–3	—	2–2	2–0
3	(Italy) Fiorentina	6	1	3	2	5	8	−3	6	Transfer to UEFA Cup	1–1	1–2	—	0–0
4	(Romania) Steaua București	6	0	1	5	3	12	−9	1		0–1	3–5	0–1	—

Source: RSSSF

17 September 2008	Steaua București (Romania)	0–1	(Germany) Bayern Munich	Steaua Stadium, Bucharest
20:45 (CEST)	Goian (yellow card) 42'; Lovin (yellow card) 69'	(Report)	Van Buyten 15'; Podolski (yellow card) 88'	Attendance: 13,379; Referee: Claus Bo Larsen (Denmark)

30 September 2008	Bayern Munich (Germany)	1–1	(France) Lyon	Fußball Arena München, Munich
20:45 (CEST)	Zé Roberto 52'; Demichelis (yellow card) 49'; Klose (yellow card) 59'	(Report)	Demichelis 25' (o.g.); Mensah (yellow card) 21'; Juninho (yellow card) 59'; Makoun (yellow card) 61'; Cris (yellow card) 77'	Attendance: 64,000; Referee: Kyros Vassaras (Greece)

21 October 2008	Bayern Munich (Germany)	3–0	(Italy) Fiorentina	Fußball Arena München, Munich
20:45 (CEST)	Klose 4'; Schweinsteiger 25'; Zé Roberto 90'; Oddo (yellow card) 58'; Ribéry (yellow card) 82'	(Report)	Kuzmanović (yellow card) 29'; Dainelli (yellow card) 64'; Gobbi (yellow card) 79'	Attendance: 66,000 (capacity); Referee: Olegário Benquerença (Portugal)

5 November 2008	Fiorentina (Italy)	1–1	(Germany) Bayern Munich	Stadio Artemio Franchi, Florence
20:45 (CET)	Mutu 11'; Montolivo (yellow card) 90+2'	(Report)	Borowski (yellow card) 45+1' (goal) 78'	Attendance: 40,000; Referee: Alberto Undiano Mallenco (Spain)

25 November 2008	Bayern Munich (Germany)	3–0	(Romania) Steaua București	Fußball Arena München, Munich
20:45 (CET)	Klose 57', 71'; Toni 61'	(Report)	Ov. Petre (yellow card) 15'; Goian (yellow card) 29'; Golański (yellow card) 84'	Attendance: 64,000; Referee: Eric Braamhaar (Netherlands)

10 December 2008	Lyon (France)	2–3	(Germany) Bayern Munich	Stade de Gerland, Lyon
20:45 (CET)	Govou 52'; Benzema 68'; Grosso (yellow card) 6'; Gassama (yellow card) 61'	(Report)	Klose 12', 37'; Ribéry 34'; Borowski (yellow card) 22'; Van Bommel (yellow card) 79'; Lahm (yellow card) 84'; Ottl (yellow card) 86'	Attendance: 40,500 (capacity); Referee: Howard Webb (England)

=== Round of 16 ===
24 February 2009	Sporting CP (Portugal)	0–5	(Germany) Bayern Munich	Estádio José Alvalade, Lisbon
20:45 (CET)	Tonel (yellow card) 45+1'; Pereirinha (yellow card) 80'	(Report)	Ribéry 42', 61' (pen.); Klose 57'; Toni 84', 90+1'; Van Bommel (yellow card) 31'	Attendance: 35,163; Referee: Bertrand Layec (France)

11 March 2009	Bayern Munich (Germany)	7–1 (12–1 agg.)	(Portugal) Sporting CP	Fußball Arena München, Munich
20:45 (CET)	Podolski 7', 34'; Polga 39' (o.g.); Schweinsteiger 43'; Van Bommel 74'; Klose 82' (pen.); Müller 90'	(Report)	Moutinho (yellow card) 18', (goal) 42'; Silva (yellow card) 77'	Attendance: 65,000; Referee: Martin Hansson (Sweden)

=== Quarter-finals ===
8 April 2009	Barcelona (Spain)	4–0	(Germany) Bayern Munich	Camp Nou, Barcelona
20:45 CEST	Messi 9', 38', (yellow card) 17'; Eto'o 12'; Henry 43'; Márquez (yellow card) 90'	(Report)	Lell (yellow card) 48'; Demichelis (yellow card) 57'	Attendance: 96,000; Referee: Howard Webb (England)
Note: Barcelona manager Pep Guardiola was ejected in the 18th minute.

14 April 2009	Bayern Munich (Germany)	1–1 (1–5 agg.)	(Spain) Barcelona	Fußball Arena München, Munich
20:45 CEST	Lúcio (yellow card) 36'; Demichelis (yellow card) 42'; Ribéry 47'; Borowski (yellow card) 82'; Lell (yellow card) 84'	(Report)	Alves (yellow card) 18'; Puyol (yellow card) 25'; Keita 73'	Attendance: 66,000; Referee: Roberto Rosetti (Italy)

== Friendly ==
=== T-Home-Supercup ===
The League Cup was not held this season. Instead Bayern and Dortmund played out the unofficial T-Home-Supercup with Bayern losing 1–2.

23 July 2008

Borussia Dortmund	2–1	Bayern Munich
Błaszczykowski 29'; Hajnal 33'	(Report)	Ekici 73'

Signal Iduna Park, Dortmund
Attendance: 47,100
Referee: Thorsten Kinhöfer (Herne)

=== Franz Beckenbauer Cup ===
Bayer invited Internazionale for the Franz Beckenbauer Cup 2009, but lost 0–1 to the guests from Italy.

5 August 2008

Bayern Munich	0–1	Internazionale
	(Report)	Mancini 51'; Maicon (yellow card)

Allianz Arena, Munich
Attendance: 64,000
Referee: Felix Brych (Munich)

=== Preseason ===
13 July 2008

SV Lippstadt 08	1–7	Bayern Munich
Chomse 76'	(Report)	Müller 3', 32', 60'; Kroos 21'; Ottl 23', 77'; Yılmaz 79'; Breno (yellow card)

Lippstadt
Attendance: 8,000
Referee: Frank Perschke

19 July 2008

1861 Nördlingen	0–8	Bayern Munich
	(Report)	Van Bommel; Ngwenya; Ottl; Yılmaz; Demichelis

Gerd-Müller-Stadtion, Nördlingen
Attendance: 10,500
Referee: Lothar Ostheimer (Petersthal)

20 July 2008

Fanclub Nabburg	1–11	Bayern Munich
Götz 26'	(Report)	Lell 5'; Yılmaz 15'; Van Bommel 38'; Demichelis 42', 78'; Ngwenya 43'; Kroos 52', 58', 68'; Hamit Altıntop 62'; Podolski 86'

Amberg
Attendance: 14,000

26 July 2008

1. FC Köln	0–0	Bayern Munich
Özat (yellow card)	(Report)	Kroos (yellow card)

RheinEnergieStadion, Cologne
Attendance: 42,000

31 July 2008

Urawa Red Diamonds	2–4	Bayern Munich
Umesaki 57'; Abe 80'	(Report)	Klose 16'; Schweinsteiger 21'; Podolski 43', 63'

Saitama Stadium, Saitama
Attendance: 30,000
Referee: Kazuhiko Matsumura

=== Intermediate ===
2 September 2008
20:45 CEST

Bayern Munich	1–1	Germany national team
Klose 51'	(Report)	Trochowski 33'

Allianz Arena, Munich
Attendance: 69,000
Referee: Markus Merk (Kaiserslautern)

19 October 2008
18:30 CEST

FC Ingolstadt	1–0	Bayern Munich
Wohlfarth 39'	(Report)

Tuja-Stadion, Ingolstadt
Attendance: 5,172
Referee: Helmut Fleischer (Hallstadt)

=== Winter break ===
10 January 2009
17:00 UTC+4

Al-Jazira	2–3	Bayern Munich
Baiano 4'; Van Buyten 76' (o.g.); Diyaki (yellow card); Sobis (yellow card)	(Report)	Schweinsteiger 31'; Van Buyten 48'; Klose 90+2'; Lell (yellow card)

Mohammad Bin Zayed Stadium, Abu Dhabi
Attendance: 6,500
Referee: Khaled Aldoki

12 January 2009
20:30 AST

Al-Wheda	1–3	Bayern Munich
Al-Kuwaikabi 53'	(Report)	Ribéry 31'; Borowski 35'; Donovan 90+1'

Prince Abdullah Alfaisal Bin Abdulaziz Stadium, Jeddah
Attendance: 12,000

17 January 2009
14:00 CET

Eintracht Bamberg	0–3	Bayern Munich
	(Report)	Borowski 27'; Lahm 35'; Klose 54'

Waldstadion, Weismain
Attendance: 15,000
Referee: Georg Schalk (Augsburg)

19 January 2009
19:00 CET

1. FC Kaiserslautern	0–2	Bayern Munich
Ouattara (yellow card); Dick (yellow card)	Report	Toni 25'; Donovan 75'; Schweinsteiger (yellow card); Van Bommel (yellow card)

Fritz Walter Stadion, Kaiserslautern
Attendance: 42,604
Referee: Christian Dingert (Lebecksmühle)

22 January 2009
20:15 CET

Mainz 05	0–5	Bayern Munich
	(Report)	Klose 4'; Toni 55'; Donovan 70', 90'; Schweinsteiger 72'

Stadion am Bruchweg, Mainz
Attendance: 16,000
Referee: Jochen Drees (Münster-Sarmsheim)

=== Postseason ===
26 May 2009
18:30 CEST

SpVgg Kaufbeuren	0–11	Bayern Munich
	(Report)	Müller 5', 23'; Klose 11', 60', 67'; Sosa 31'; Borowski 34', 36', 38', 55'; Rieß 78'

Parkstadion Kaufbeuren
Attendance: 8,000

28 May 2009
18:30 CEST

VfB Eichstätt	3–8	Bayern Munich
Witasek 18', 30'; Zehentmeier 85'	(Report)	Müller 6', 11', 31', 74', 87'; Klose 16', 62'; Borowski 34'

Sportplatz Eichstätt
Attendance: 4,000 (capacity)

29 May 2009
18:00 CEST

1. FC Magdeburg	2–3	Bayern Munich
Georgi 49'; Rosin 58'	(Report)	Klose 8', 40', 54'

Stadion Magdeburg
Attendance: 15,605
Referee: René Hammer (Ranis)

30 May 2009
15:30 CEST

Fortuna Sittard	0–2	Bayern Munich
Grosso (yellow card) 6'	(Report)	Müller 59'; Sosa 87'

Wagner & Partners Stadion

== Players ==
=== Squad information ===
These stats are as 25 May 2009, the final day of the 2008–09 Bundesliga season.

N	Pos.	Nat.	Name	Age	EU	Since	App	Goals	Ends	Transfer fee	Notes
1	GK	(Germany)	Michael Rensing	25	EU	2003	49	0	2010	Youth system	
22	GK	(Germany)	Hans-Jörg Butt	34	EU	2008	8	0	2010	Free	
35	GK	(Germany)	Thomas Kraft	20	EU	2006	0	0	2011	Youth system	
3	DF	(Brazil)	Lúcio (VC)	31	Non-EU	2004	144	7	2010	€12m	
5	DF	(Belgium)	Daniel Van Buyten	31	EU	2006	68	7	2010	€8M	
6	DF	(Argentina)	Martín Demichelis (VC)	28	Non-EU	2003	147	11	2012	€5M	
21	DF	(Germany)	Philipp Lahm	25	EU	2005	104	4	2012	Loan return	
23	DF	(Italy)	Massimo Oddo	32	EU	2008	18	0	2009	Loaned	
30	DF	(Germany)	Christian Lell	24	EU	2003	65	1	2011	Youth system	
33	DF	(Brazil)	Breno	19	Non-EU	2008	5	0	2012	€12M	
7	MF	(France)	Franck Ribéry	26	EU	2007	53	20	2011	€25M	
8	MF	(Turkey)	Hamit Altıntop	26	EU	2007	34	5	2010	Free	
15	MF	(Brazil)	Zé Roberto	34	EU	2007	169	14	2009	€9.5M	
16	MF	(Germany)	Andreas Ottl	24	EU	2005	73	5	2011	Youth system	
17	MF	(Netherlands)	Mark van Bommel (captain)	32	EU	2006	85	10	2009	€6M	
20	MF	(Argentina)	José Sosa	23	Non-EU	2007	32	2	2011	€6M	
24	MF	(Germany)	Tim Borowski	29	EU	2008	26	5	2011	Free	
31	MF	(Germany)	Bastian Schweinsteiger	24	EU	2002	184	20	2012	Youth system	
9	FW	(Italy)	Luca Toni	31	EU	2007	56	38	2011	€11M	
11	FW	(Germany)	Lukas Podolski	23	EU	2006	72	15	2010	€10M	
18	FW	(Germany)	Miroslav Klose	30	EU	2007	53	20	2011	€14M	
25	FW	(Germany)	Thomas Müller	19	EU	2008	4	0	2011	Youth system	

- Last updated: 25 January 2010
- Source: Wikipedia players' articles,

Fussballdaten.de (for appearances and goals)

- Ordered by position on pitch.

=== Transfers in ===
No.	Pos.	Nat.	Name	Age	EU	Moving from	Type	Transfer window	Ends	Transfer fee	Source
24	MF	(Germany)	Tim Borowski	29	EU	Werder Bremen	End of contract	Summer	2011	Free	
13	FW	(United States)	Landon Donovan	27	Non-EU	LA Galaxy (United States)	Loaned	Winter	2009	Free	

Total spending: ▼€0.0 million

=== Transfers out ===
No.	Pos.	Nat.	Name	Age	EU	Moving to	Type	Transfer window	Transfer fee	Source
1	GK	(Germany)	Oliver Kahn	39	EU		Career end	Summer	n/a	
29	GK	(Germany)	Bernd Dreher	42	EU		Career end	Summer	n/a	
2	DF	(France)	Willy Sagnol	32	EU		Career end	Summer	n/a	
23	DF	(Germany)	Marcell Jansen	23	EU	Hamburger SV	Transfer	Summer	€8M	
	MF	(Paraguay)	Julio dos Santos	26	Non-EU	Atlético Paranaense (Brazil)	Transfer	Summer	Free	
19	FW	(Germany)	Jan Schlaudraff	25	EU	Hannover 96	Transfer	Summer	€2M	
34	FW	(Germany)	Sandro Wagner	21	EU	MSV Duisburg	Transfer	Summer	Free	
32	DF	(Germany)	Georg Niedermeier	23	EU	VfB Stuttgart	Loaned out	Winter	€0.1M	
39	MF	(Germany)	Toni Kroos	18	EU	Bayer Leverkusen	Loaned out	Winter	Free	
13	FW	(United States)	Landon Donovan	27	Non-EU	LA Galaxy (United States)	Loan return	Winter	n/a	

EU = if holds or not a European Union passport; Country: when 2 flags, 1st flag = country that plays for internationally, 2nd flag = country of birth; N = number on jersey; P = Position (for position name, pause mouse pointer on abbreviation); Name = Name on jersey (for more extensive name, pause mouse pointer on name); Age = age on the day of the signing; Moving from = only indicate the club the player was playing before start playing for this club in this season, for the type of the moving see Status column; Moving to = only indicates the club the player is going to play next, for the type of the moving see Status column; Ends = when the player's current contract ends; n/a = Not applicable.

Total income: ▲€10,100,000

=== Individual statistics ===
No.	Pos	Nat	Player	Total		Bundesliga		Champions League		DFB-Pokal	
No.	Pos	Nat	Player	Apps	Goals	Apps	Goals	Apps	Goals	Apps	Goals
1	GK	(Germany) GER	Michael Rensing	37	0	26	0	7	0	4	0
22	GK	(Germany) GER	Hans-Jörg Butt	11	0	8	0	3	0	0	0
35	GK	(Germany) GER	Thomas Kraft	0	0	0	0	0	0	0	0
3	DF	(Brazil) BRA	Lúcio (vice-captain)	44	2	32	1	8	0	4	1
5	DF	(Belgium) BEL	Daniel Van Buyten	25	4	18	3	5	1	2	0
6	DF	(Argentina) ARG	Martín Demichelis (vice-captain)	40	4	29	4	8	0	3	0
21	DF	(Germany) GER	Philipp Lahm	39	4	28	3	8	0	3	1
23	DF	(Italy) ITA	Massimo Oddo	27	0	18	0	7	0	2	0
30	DF	(Germany) GER	Christian Lell	28	0	20	0	6	0	2	0
33	DF	(Brazil) BRA	Breno	8	0	4	0	4	0	0	0
7	MF	(France) FRA	Franck Ribéry	36	14	25	9	8	4	3	1
8	MF	(Turkey) TUR	Hamit Altıntop	16	2	10	2	3	0	3	0
15	MF	(Brazil) BRA	Zé Roberto	42	7	29	4	9	2	4	1
16	MF	(Germany) GER	Andreas Ottl	28	0	20	0	4	0	4	0
17	MF	(Netherlands) NED	Mark van Bommel (captain)	41	3	29	2	9	1	3	0
20	MF	(Argentina) ARG	José Sosa	20	2	17	2	2	0	1	0
24	MF	(Germany) GER	Tim Borowski	32	7	23	5	7	1	2	1
31	MF	(Germany) GER	Bastian Schweinsteiger	44	9	31	5	9	2	4	2
9	FW	(Italy) ITA	Luca Toni	35	18	25	14	8	3	2	1
11	FW	(Germany) GER	Lukas Podolski	31	9	24	6	4	2	3	1
18	FW	(Germany) GER	Miroslav Klose	37	20	25	10	8	7	4	3
25	FW	(Germany) GER	Thomas Müller	5	1	4	0	1	1	0	0
Players sold/retired after the start of the season:
2	DF	(France) FRA	Willy Sagnol	0	0	0	0	0	0	0	0
23	DF	(Germany) GER	Marcell Jansen	0	0	0	0	0	0	0	0
32	DF	(Germany) GER	Georg Niedermeier	0	0	0	0	0	0	0	0
39	MF	(Germany) GER	Toni Kroos	8	1	6	0	1	0	1	1
13	FW	(United States) USA	Landon Donovan (on loan from January to March 2009)	7	0	6	0	0	0	1	0

As of 25 May 2009

=== Goals ===
Pos.	Player	BL	CL	Cup	Overall
1	(Germany) Miroslav Klose	10	7	3	20
2	(Italy) Luca Toni	14	3	1	18
3	(France) Franck Ribéry	9	4	1	14
4	(Germany) Lukas Podolski	6	2	1	9
4	(Germany) Bastian Schweinsteiger	5	2	2	9
6	(Germany) Tim Borowski	5	1	1	7
6	(Brazil) Zé Roberto	4	2	1	7
