= Pedro Ríos =

Spanish footballer (born 1981)

Personal information
- Full name: Pedro Ríos Maestre
- Date of birth: 12 December 1981 (age 44)
- Place of birth: Jerez de la Frontera, Spain
- Height: 1.75 m (5 ft 9 in)
- Position: Winger

Youth career
- Xerez
- Flamenco

Senior career*
Years	Team	Apps	(Gls)
2000–2001	Sanluqueño		
2001–2004	Ceuta	99	(25)
2004–2009	Xerez	146	(23)
2009–2012	Getafe	71	(10)
2012–2014	Levante	38	(3)
2014–2015	Recreativo	37	(7)
2015–2017	Córdoba	66	(8)
2017–2020	San Fernando	75	(22)
Total		532	(98)
- * Club domestic league appearances and goals

Pedro Ríos Maestre (Spanish pronunciation: [ˈpeðɾo ˈri.os]; born 12 December 1981) is a Spanish former professional footballer who played as a right winger.

He appeared in 109 La Liga matches over five seasons, scoring a total of 13 goals for Getafe and Levante. He added 248 games and 38 goals in the Segunda División, in a 20-year senior career.

== Club career ==
Ríos was born in Jerez de la Frontera, Province of Cádiz. After playing with Atlético Sanluqueño CF (Tercera División, having started his career as a striker) and AD Ceuta (Segunda División B), he signed with local club Xerez CD in 2004. He scored 11 Segunda División goals in his second professional season, for a final seventh place.

After playing an important part in Xerez's first-ever promotion to La Liga – 24 games and 17 starts, four goals in nearly 1,600 minutes of action – Ríos agreed to a three-year contract with Getafe CF in the summer of 2009. Scarcely used in his debut campaign as the Madrid side qualified for the UEFA Europa League, he was made first choice after Pedro León's departure to Real Madrid.

On 5 December 2010, Ríos scored twice as Getafe downed RCD Mallorca 3–0 at home. He finished the season with seven league goals, as they narrowly escaped relegation.

Ríos moved to fellow top-tier team Levante UD on 6 July 2012. He made 37 competitive appearances in his first year with five goals, including three in the Europa League.

Ríos alternated between the second and third divisions until his retirement at the age of 38, representing Recreativo de Huelva, Córdoba CF and San Fernando CD. Immediately afterwards, he joined his last club's coaching staff.
