= Neuenkirchen, Westphalia =

Neuenkirchen
- Town
- Coat of arms

- Location of Neuenkirchen within Steinfurt district
- Interactive map of Neuenkirchen
- Location within Germany Location within North Rhine-Westphalia
- Coordinates: 52°14′28″N 7°22′08″E
- Country: Germany
- State: North Rhine-Westphalia
- Admin. region: Münster
- District: Steinfurt

Government
  - Mayor (2020–25): Wilfried Brüning (SPD)

Area
  - Total: 48.44 km^{2} (18.70 sq mi)
- Elevation: 58 m (190 ft)

Population (2025-12-31)
  - Total: 13,770
  - Density: 284.3/km^{2} (736.3/sq mi)
- Time zone: UTC+01:00 (CET)
  - Summer (DST): UTC+02:00 (CEST)
- Postal codes: 48485
- Dialling codes: 05973
- Vehicle registration: ST
- Website: www.neuenkirchen.de

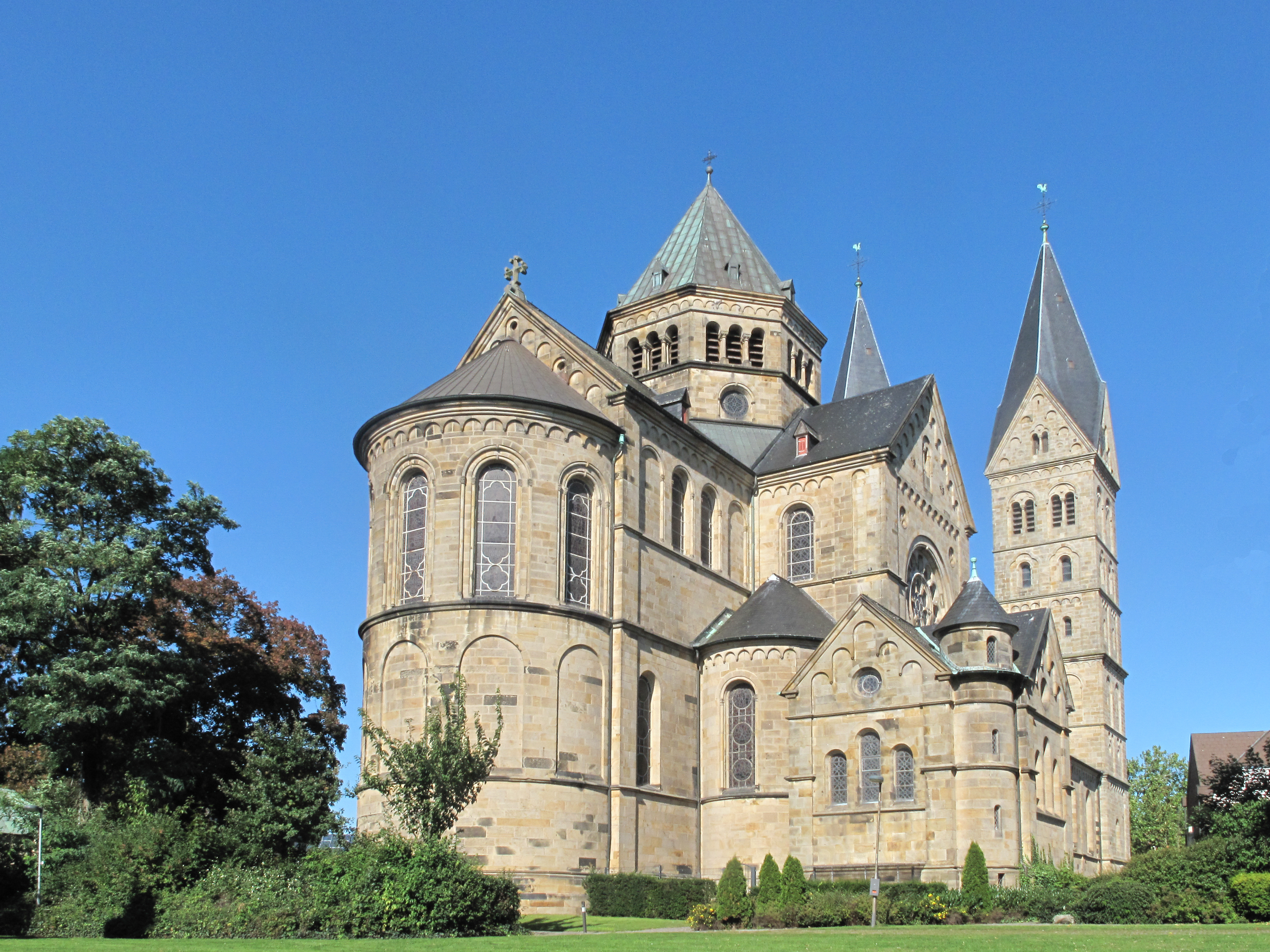
Neuenkirchen: Catholic church Sankt Anna

Neuenkirchen (German pronunciation: [ˈnɔʏənˌkɪʁçn̩]; Low German: Nienkiärken) is a municipality in the district of Steinfurt, in North Rhine-Westphalia, Germany. Neuenkirchen is the biggest village in the district of Steinfurt and noted for its stately homes. It is situated approximately 7 km southwest of Rheine and 35 km north-west of Münster.

== Geography ==
=== Neighbouring places ===
- Wettringen
- Steinfurt
- Emsdetten
- Rheine
- Salzbergen

=== Division of the municipality ===
- St. Arnold
- Offlum
- Sutrum-Harum
- Landersum

== Population ==
Historical population

Year	Pop.	±% p.a.
1965	9,264	—
1970	10,284	+2.11%
1975	11,017	+1.39%
1980	11,277	+0.47%
1985	11,235	−0.07%
1990	11,773	+0.94%
1995	12,473	+1.16%

Year	Pop.	±% p.a.
2000	13,445	+1.51%
2005	13,941	+0.73%
2010	13,774	−0.24%
2015	13,743	−0.05%
2020	13,892	+0.22%
2025	13,770	−0.18%

Source: Landesdatabank Nordrhein-Westfalen

== Politics ==
=== Town assembly ===
After the local elections on September 26, 2004, the town assembly has the following structure:

- CDU: 15 seats
- SPD: 5 seats
- Green Party: 2 seats
- FDP: 1 seats
- UWG: 3 seats

=== Sons and daughters of the community ===
- Johannes Georg Bednorz (born 1950), physicist and Nobel laureate, a residential street bears his name (Georg-Bednorz-Strasse).
- Josef F. Bille (born 1944), physicist and inventor, bearer of the European Inventive Price
- Isaac Leeser (1806-1868), American Jewish religious leader, teacher, scholar and publisher
- August Rohling (1839-1931), theologian and anti-Semite
- Hans Weiner (born 1950), footballer
- André Wiwerink (born 1980), footballer
- Joseph Epping (1835-1894), German assyrologist and mathematician
- August Rohling (1839-1931), German theologian
- Josef Bille (1944-2013), German physicist
- Georg Bednorz (born 1950), German physicist
- Jürgen Coße (born 1969), German politician
- André Wiwerink (born 1980), German footballer
- Malte Nieweler (born 1994), German footballer
