= Ángel Rodríguez (footballer, born 1987) =

Spanish footballer

Ángel
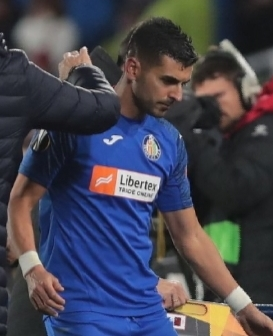
- Ángel with Getafe in 2019

Personal information
- Full name: Ángel Luis Rodríguez Díaz
- Date of birth: 26 April 1987 (age 39)
- Place of birth: Santa Cruz de Tenerife, Spain
- Height: 1.72 m (5 ft 8 in)
- Position: Forward

Team information
- Current team: Fuenlabrada
- Number: 22

Youth career
- Tenerife

Senior career*
| Years | Team | Apps | (Gls) |
| 2005–2006 | Tenerife B | 17 | (2) |
| 2006–2010 | Tenerife | 103 | (16) |
| 2007 | → Real Madrid B (loan) | 3 | (0) |
| 2008 | → Osasuna B (loan) | 17 | (4) |
| 2010–2012 | Elche | 66 | (28) |
| 2012–2014 | Levante | 20 | (3) |
| 2013 | → Elche (loan) | 15 | (4) |
| 2014–2015 | Eibar | 15 | (0) |
| 2015–2017 | Zaragoza | 74 | (32) |
| 2017–2021 | Getafe | 135 | (36) |
| 2021–2023 | Mallorca | 46 | (5) |
| 2023–2025 | Tenerife | 62 | (11) |
| 2026– | Fuenlabrada | 7 | (0) |

International career
| 2006 | Spain U19 | 1 | (0) |
- * Club domestic league appearances and goals as of 12:46, 7 May 2026 (UTC)

Ángel Luis Rodríguez Díaz (born 26 April 1987), known simply as Ángel, is a Spanish professional footballer who plays as a forward for Segunda Federación club Fuenlabrada.

== Club career ==
=== Tenerife ===
Born in Santa Cruz de Tenerife, Ángel emerged through the youth ranks of local CD Tenerife, scoring seven Segunda División goals in his first full professional season. He split 2007–08 on loan to Segunda División B teams Real Madrid Castilla and CA Osasuna B.

Ángel returned to the Canary Islands for 2008–09, being an important attacking element as the club returned to La Liga after a seven-year absence. He made his debut in the competition on 29 August 2009, in a 1–0 away loss against Real Zaragoza (ten minutes played). He contributed one goal in 24 games – all as a substitute – during the campaign, in an eventual relegation.

=== Elche, Levante and Eibar ===
In the summer of 2010, Ángel returned to the second division as he signed with Elche CF. On 23 April 2011, he scored all of his side's goals in a 3–0 home win over SD Huesca, totalling 29 during his spell at the Estadio Martínez Valero, including once in the unsuccessful promotion playoffs against Real Valladolid.

Ángel joined top-flight team Levante UD on 15 June 2012, agreeing to a 2+1 deal. He scored twice in the group stage of the UEFA Europa League in the first half of the season but, after seeing playing opportunities limited, returned to former side Elche in January 2013 on loan.

Levante did not renew his contract after the end of the 2013–14 campaign and on 9 July, Ángel moved to newly promoted SD Eibar on a one-year deal, with an option to extend for a further year.

=== Zaragoza ===
On 13 July 2015, Ángel signed a two-year deal for Zaragoza of the second tier. In 2016–17, he scored a career-best 21 goals.

On 7 June 2017, the club announced that they had ceased all negotiations regarding a possible contract renewal after Ángel said that he would rather lose against his former team Tenerife in the last match of the season.

=== Getafe ===
Ángel joined Getafe CF on 6 July 2017, until 2020. He scored 13 times in his first year, helping them finish eighth in the top tier.

=== Mallorca ===
On 2 July 2021, free agent Ángel signed a two-year contract with RCD Mallorca, newly promoted to the top division. He was mainly a reserve during his tenure, totalling 11 goals in all competitions.

=== Tenerife return ===
On 23 June 2023, Ángel returned to his first club Tenerife on a two-year contract. He scored ten times in the first season of his second spell.

== Career statistics ==
As of match played 22 May 2022

Appearances and goals by club, season and competition
| Club | Season | League | | | National Cup | | Continental | | Other | | Total | |
| Club | Season | Division | Apps | Goals | Apps | Goals | Apps | Goals | Apps | Goals | Apps | Goals |
|---|---|---|---|---|---|---|---|---|---|---|---|---|
| Tenerife | 2005–06 | Segunda División | 17 | 2 | 0 | 0 | — | | — | | 17 | 2 |
| Tenerife | 2006–07 | Segunda División | 29 | 7 | 1 | 1 | — | | — | | 30 | 8 |
| Tenerife | 2008–09 | Segunda División | 33 | 6 | 2 | 0 | — | | — | | 35 | 6 |
| Tenerife | 2009–10 | La Liga | 24 | 1 | 2 | 0 | — | | — | | 26 | 1 |
| Tenerife | Total | | 103 | 16 | 5 | 1 | 0 | 0 | 0 | 0 | 108 | 17 |
| Real Madrid B (loan) | 2007–08 | Segunda División B | 3 | 0 | — | | — | | — | | 3 | 0 |
| Osasuna B (loan) | 2007–08 | Segunda División B | 17 | 4 | — | | — | | 2 (Note: Appearances in Segunda División B relegation play-offs) | 0 | 19 | 4 |
| Elche | 2010–11 | Segunda División | 27 | 15 | 0 | 0 | — | | 4 (Note: Appearances in La Liga play-offs) | 1 | 31 | 16 |
| Elche | 2011–12 | Segunda División | 39 | 13 | 2 | 0 | — | | — | | 41 | 13 |
| Elche | Total | | 66 | 28 | 2 | 0 | 0 | 0 | 4 | 1 | 72 | 29 |
| Levante | 2012–13 | La Liga | 10 | 1 | 4 | 0 | 6 (Note: Appearances in UEFA Europa League) | 2 | — | | 20 | 3 |
| Levante | 2013–14 | La Liga | 10 | 2 | 5 | 0 | — | | — | | 15 | 2 |
| Levante | Total | | 20 | 3 | 9 | 0 | 6 | 2 | 0 | 0 | 35 | 5 |
| Elche (loan) | 2012–13 | Segunda División | 15 | 4 | 0 | 0 | — | | — | | 15 | 4 |
| Eibar | 2014–15 | La Liga | 15 | 0 | 2 | 0 | — | | — | | 17 | 0 |
| Zaragoza | 2015–16 | Segunda División | 35 | 11 | 1 | 1 | — | | — | | 36 | 12 |
| Zaragoza | 2016–17 | Segunda División | 39 | 21 | 0 | 0 | — | | — | | 39 | 21 |
| Zaragoza | Total | | 74 | 32 | 1 | 1 | 0 | 0 | 0 | 0 | 75 | 33 |
| Getafe | 2017–18 | La Liga | 33 | 13 | 1 | 0 | — | | — | | 34 | 13 |
| Getafe | 2018–19 | La Liga | 37 | 8 | 5 | 5 | — | | — | | 42 | 13 |
| Getafe | 2019–20 | La Liga | 32 | 10 | 2 | 1 | 8 | 3 | — | | 42 | 14 |
| Getafe | 2020–21 | La Liga | 33 | 5 | 2 | 1 | — | | — | | 35 | 6 |
| Getafe | Total | | 135 | 36 | 10 | 7 | 8 | 3 | 0 | 0 | 153 | 46 |
| Mallorca | 2021–22 | La Liga | 29 | 4 | 4 | 4 | — | | — | | 33 | 8 |
| Career total | | | 477 | 127 | 33 | 13 | 14 | 5 | 6 | 1 | 530 | 146 |

== Honours ==
Elche

- Segunda División: 2012–13

Individual

- Segunda División Player of the Month: August 2016
- Copa del Rey top scorer: 2018–19 (5 goals)
