= Josef Bille =

German physicist

Josef Bille (20 September 1944 – 1 July 2023) was a German physicist.

== Life ==
Born in Neuenkirchen), Bille studied physics at Karlsruhe Institute of Technology in Germany. From 1974 to 1978 he worked for the company Hoechst AG. Since 1978 Bille worked at Heidelberg University. From 1986 to 1991 Bille worked at the University of California. He patented surgical lasers for LASIK in 1988. He founded five companies in Heidelberg and United States.

He died on 1 July 2023 at the age of 78.

== Awards ==
- 1999: German Future Prize
- 2012: European Inventor Award
