= Christian Lell =

German footballer (born 1984)

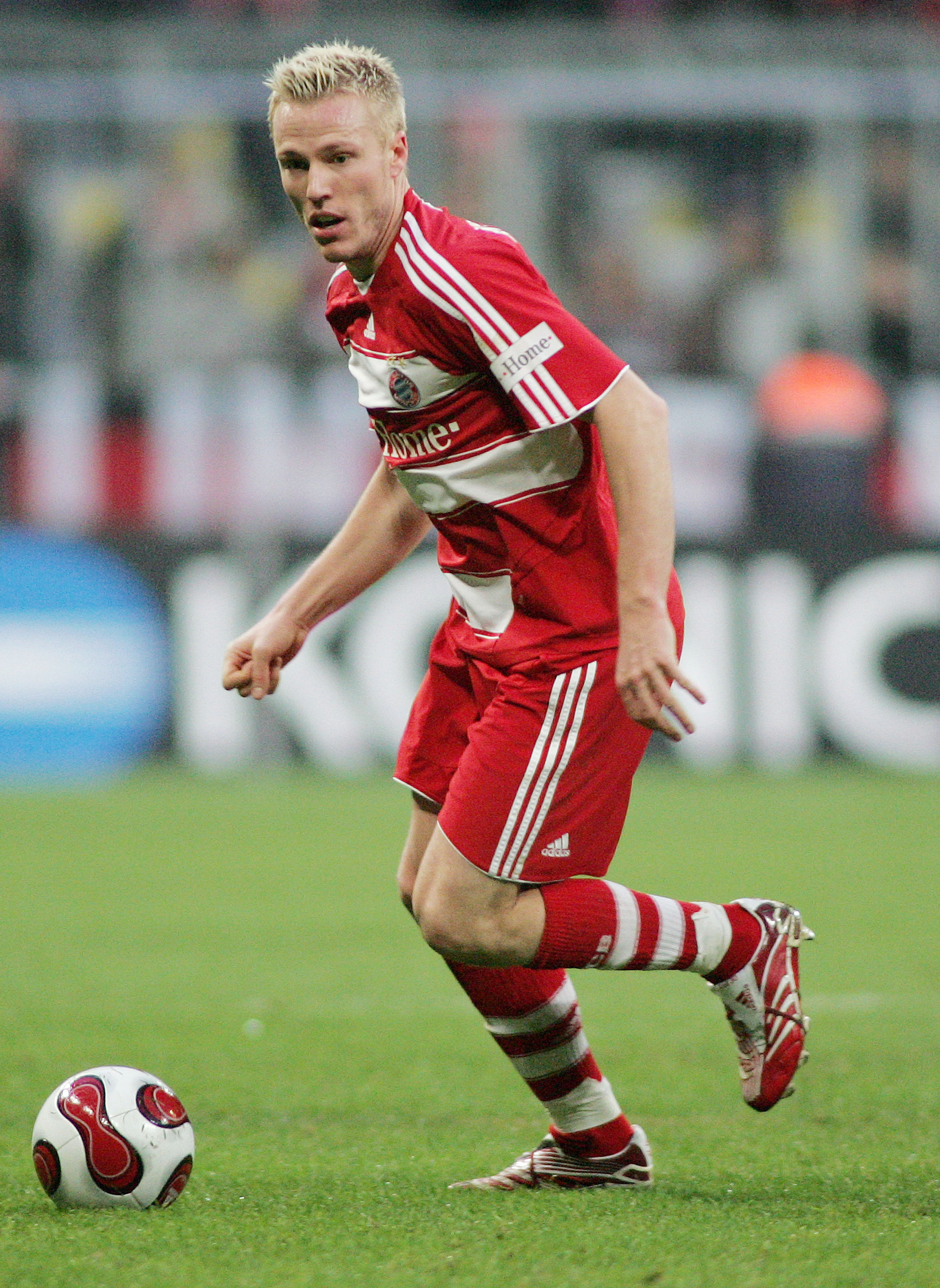
- Lell with Bayern Munich in 2007

Personal information
- Date of birth: 29 August 1984 (age 42)
- Place of birth: Munich, West Germany
- Height: 1.83 m (6 ft 0 in)
- Position: Right-back

Youth career
- –1993: Alemannia Munich
- 1993–2001: Bayern Munich

Senior career*
Years	Team	Apps	(Gls)
2001–2010	Bayern Munich II	70	(2)
2003–2010	Bayern Munich	65	(1)
2004	→ 1. FC Köln II (loan)	8	(0)
2004–2006	→ 1. FC Köln (loan)	42	(1)
2010–2012	Hertha BSC	61	(1)
2012–2014	Levante	26	(2)
2015–2016	Weyarn		
Total		272	(7)

International career
2003–2004	Germany U-20	6	(0)
2004	Germany U-21	2	(0)
- * Club domestic league appearances and goals

Christian Lell (born 29 August 1984) is a German former professional footballer who played as a right-back.

== Career ==
=== Bayern Munich ===
==== Early career ====
Born in Munich, Bavaria, Lell started his training with FC Alemannia München, He earned a place in Bayern's youth section in 1993, and played there for eight years.

For the 2001–02 season, Lell was a part of Bayern's reserve team. In his first season at the senior level, the right-wingback made 10 appearances in the Regionalliga Süd. He would make 31 league appearances and a cup appearance during the 2002–03 season. He made 20 appearances for the reserve team during the 2003–04 season. Lell made his Bundesliga debut on 4 October 2003 in a 4–1 against Hertha BSC where he came on as a substitute for Michael Ballack in 84th minute. He made three subsequent appearances for Bayern in Bundesliga play and a cup appearance during the 2003–04 season.

==== Loan to 1. FC Köln ====
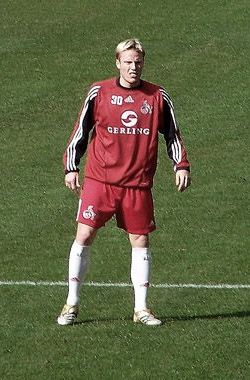
Lell warming up for a match with Köln

To the beginning of the 2004–05 season, Lell was loaned to 2. Bundesliga club 1. FC Köln, where he had a disappointing season. After the 4–2 loss to Wacker Burghausen on the second matchday, Lell fell out of favour with manager Huub Stevens. He earned a mere sixteen league appearances over the course of the season. The season however wasn't entirely without successes for Lell. In Köln's second league match against Wacker Burghausen he scored a goal. Beyond that, he earned two caps in the DFB-Pokal, and eight for the reserves in the Regionalliga Nord. After the "Billy goats'" successful return to the Bundesliga for the 2005–06 season, Lell earned considerably more appearances, especially during the latter half of the season, during which he advanced to the regular starting formation. He finished the season with 26 league appearances and a cup appearance.

==== Return to Bayern Munich ====
For the 2006–07 season, Lell returned to Bayern, appearing 16 times for the first team and eight times for the reserve team. The 2007–08 Bundesliga season meant a lot to Lell. Because of the injury problem to vice-captain and starting right-back Willy Sagnol, Ottmar Hitzfeld decided to put Lell into the starting line-up as the right fullback. In this season, Lell earned 29 appearances in the Bundesliga, scored his first Bundesliga goal. In the German Cup, he played eight matches, in the UEFA Cup, he played 11 matches and scored one goal, and three times in the league cup. During the 2008–09 season, under coach Jürgen Klinsmann and interim coach Jupp Heynckes, Lell made 28 appearances in all competitions.

On 1 September 2009, just before the transfer window closed, Bayern and Premier League club Stoke City came to an agreement for Lell transfer to England. However, the deal failed when no one was able to contact Lell and inform him about it. As a result, the transfer window closed before Lell could agree to the transfer. In the 2009–10 season, new Bayern coach Louis van Gaal relegated Lell to the reserves, where he made an appearance. He almo made an appearance in the cup for the first team.

=== Hertha BSC and Levante ===
Seven years after making his debut with first team, he left the Bavarian side and signed for Hertha BSC on 23 June 2010. This ended a 17-year connection dating back to 1 July 1993 when he joined Bayern Munich's youth academy. His contract in Berlin ran for one year, and was automatically extended for an additional two as Hertha earned promotion to the Bundesliga. Lell quickly established himself as an important part of Hertha's defense, starting almost every fixture and assuming vice-captaincy of the team. He finished the 2010–11 season with 33 league appearances and two cup appearances. He would go on to 28 league appearances, two cup appearances, and an appearance in the relegation playoff.

On 7 June 2012, Lell was released along with Patrick Ebert, Andreas Ottl, and Andre Mijatovic. The decision to part company with Lell came a day after he was given a five-match ban for insulting referee Wolfgang Stark during a relegation play-off match against Fortuna Düsseldorf.

Lell signed for Levante on 11 August 2012. The contract is for a season plus a one-year option. He would go on to score two goals in 28 appearances in 2012–13 season and no goals in five appearances in the 2013–14 season.

== International career ==
Christian Lell represented Germany on the Under-20 team at the 2003 FIFA World Youth Championship.

Lell also holds Austrian citizenship. After voicing desire to play for the Austria national team, he was found not eligible.

== Personal life ==
Lell's sister died in April 2014 at the age of 27 from cystic fibrosis. He started a foundation for cystic fibrosis in 2009.

== Career statistics ==
Appearances and goals by club, season and competition
Club	Season	League			Cup		Continental		Other (Note: Includes DFB-Ligapokal and relegation playoff.)		Total		Ref.
Club	Season	Division	Apps	Goals	Apps	Goals	Apps	Goals	Apps	Goals	Apps	Goals	Ref.
Bayern Munich II	2001–02	Regionalliga Süd	10	0	—		—		—		10	0	
Bayern Munich II	2002–03	Regionalliga Süd	31	0	1	0	—		—		32	0	
Bayern Munich II	2003–04	Regionalliga Süd	20	0	—		—		—		20	0	
Bayern Munich II	2006–07	Regionalliga Süd	8	2	—		—		—		8	2	
Bayern Munich II	2009–10	3. Liga	1	0	—		—		—		1	0	
Bayern Munich II	Total		70	2	1	0	0	0	0	0	71	2	—
Bayern Munich	2003–04	Bundesliga	4	0	1	0	0	0	0	0	5	0	
Bayern Munich	2006–07	Bundesliga	12	0	0	0	4	0	0	0	16	0	
Bayern Munich	2007–08	Bundesliga	29	1	5	0	11	1	3	0	48	2	
Bayern Munich	2008–09	Bundesliga	20	0	2	0	6	0	—		28	0	
Bayern Munich	2009–10	Bundesliga	0	0	1	0	0	0	—		1	0	
Bayern Munich	Total		65	1	9	0	21	1	3	0	98	2	—
1. FC Köln II (loan)	2004–05	Regionalliga Nord	8	0	—		—		—		8	0	
1. FC Köln (loan)	2004–05	2. Bundesliga	16	1	2	0	—		—		18	1	
1. FC Köln (loan)	2005–06	Bundesliga	26	0	1	0	—		—		27	0	
1. FC Köln (loan)	Total		42	1	3	0	0	0	45	1	—		
Hertha BSC	2010–11	2. Bundesliga	33	0	2	0	—		—		35	0	
Hertha BSC	2011–12	Bundesliga	28	1	2	0	—		1	0	31	1	
Hertha BSC	Total		61	1	4	0	0	0	1	0	66	1	—
Levante	2012–13	La Liga	21	2	1	0	6	0	—		28	2	
Levante	2013–14	La Liga	5	0	0	0	—		—		5	0	
Levante	Total		26	2	1	0	6	0	0	0	33	2	—
Career total			272	7	18	0	27	1	4	0	321	8	—

== Honours ==
Bayern Munich

- Bundesliga: 2007–08, 2009–10
- DFB-Pokal: 2007–08, 2009–10
- DFB Liga-Pokal: 2007
- UEFA Champions League runner-up: 2009–10

1. FC Köln

- 2. Bundesliga: 2004–05
