= 2012–13 Levante UD season =

Levante UD
2012–13 season
- President: Quico Catalán
- Head coach: Juan Ignacio Martínez
- Stadium: Ciutat de València
- La Liga: 10th
- Copa Del Rey: Round of 16
- UEFA Europa League: Round of 16
- Top goalscorer: League: Martins (7); All: Martins (9)
Home colours	Away colours	Third colours

The 2012–13 Levante season is the 72nd season in club history and their first ever in European competition, where they will enter the playoff round in the UEFA Europa League after finishing 6th in the 2011–12 season.

== Competitions ==
=== Overall ===
As of 14 March 2013

Competition	Started round	Current position/round	Final position	First match	Last match
La Liga	—	10th		19 August 2012	1 June 2013
Copa del Rey	Round of 32		Round of 16	1 November 2012	9 January 2013
UEFA Europa League	Play-off Round		Round of 16	23 August 2012	14 March 2013

=== Pre-season ===
Kickoff times are in CET.

Win Draw Loss

Round	Date/Time	Opponents	Location	Score	Scorers	Referee
Friendly	19 July 2012 – 18:30	(Spain) Deportiva Minera	Coliseo Minero, Cartagena	2–0	Michel 37', Koné 65'	Cristobal Boitia Moya (Murcia)
Friendly	22 July 2012 – 10:45	(Spain) Almería	La Manga Stadium, La Manga	0–3
Friendly	27 July 2012 – 20:30	(Spain) Burriana	San Fernando, Burriana	3–0	Roger 33', Koné 75', Juanlu 84'	Abraham Abad (Valencia)
Italian Tour	2 August 2012 – 20:55	(Italy) Perugia	Stadio Renato Curi, Perugia	2–0	Koné 41', Juanlu 80'	Fabricio Pasqua di Tivoli (Italy)
Italian Tour	5 August 2012 – 20:45	(Italy) Genoa	Stadio Teofilo Patini, Castel di Sangro	1–0	Barkero 68'	Gianpaolo Calvarese (Italy)
Italian Tour	8 August 2012 – 15:30	(Italy) Pescara	Stadio Adriatico, Pescara	0–0		Damato Antonio (Italy)
XIII Trofeo de la Cerámica	11 August 2012 – 19:45	(Spain) Villarreal	El Madrigal, Vila-real	1–2	Ángel 12'	Juan Martínez Munuera (Valencia)

=== La Liga ===
==== League table ====
Pos	Team	Pld	W	D	L	GF	GA	GD	Pts	Qualification or relegation
9	Sevilla	38	14	8	16	58	54	+4	50	Qualification for the Europa League third qualifying round (Note: Since the 2012–13 Copa del Rey champions Atlético Madrid and runners-up Real Madrid qualified for the 2013–14 UEFA Champions League, the 5th, 6th and 7th placed teams qualified for the group stage, play-off round, and third qualifying round of the 2013–14 UEFA Europa League respectively.)
10	Getafe	38	13	8	17	43	57	−14	47	
11	Levante	38	12	10	16	40	57	−17	46	
12	Athletic Bilbao	38	12	9	17	44	65	−21	45	
13	Espanyol	38	11	11	16	43	52	−9	44	

Source: La Liga
Rules for classification: 1st points; 2nd head-to-head points; 3rd head-to-head goal difference; 4th goal difference; 5th number of goals scored; 7th Fair-play points

==== Results summary ====
Overall								Home						Away					
Pld	W	D	L	GF	GA	GD	Pts	W	D	L	GF	GA	GD	W	D	L	GF	GA	GD
27	10	6	11	32	40	−8	36	7	2	4	21	17	+4	3	4	7	11	23	−12

Last updated: 14 March 2013.
Source: Levante UD

==== Matches ====
Kickoff times are in CET.

Round	Date/Time	Opponents	Location	Score	Scorers	Referee
1	19 August 2012 – 23:00	Atlético Madrid	Ciutat de València, Valencia	1–1	El Zhar 5'	Clos Gómez (Aragon)
2	27 August 2012 – 20:00	Real Valladolid	José Zorrilla, Valladolid	0–2		Iglesias Villanueva (Galicia)
3	2 September 2012 – 18:00	Espanyol	Ciutat de València, Valencia	3–2	Juanlu 54', Lell 56', Rodríguez 90+3' (o.g.)	J. A. Teixeira Vitienes (Cantabria)
4	15 September 2012 – 16:00	Málaga	La Rosaleda, Málaga	1–3	Míchel 46'	Velasco Carballo (Community of Madrid)
5	23 September 2012 – 16:00	Real Sociedad	Ciutat de València, Valencia	2–1	Barkero 70' (pen.), Martins 86'	Hernández Hernández (Catalonia)
6	30 September 2012 – 18:00	Osasuna	El Sadar, Pamplona	0–4		Álvarez Izquierdo (Catalonia)
7	7 October 2012 – 16:00	Valencia	Ciutat de València, Valencia	1–0	Martins 22'	Del Cerro Grande (Community of Madrid)
8	21 October 2012 – 18:00	Getafe	Alfonso Pérez, Getafe	1–0	Míchel 87'	Pérez Montero (Andalusia)
9	28 October 2012 – 16:00	Granada	Ciutat de València, Valencia	3–1	Martins 12', 60', Pedro Ríos 73'	Iglesias Villanueva (Galicia)
10	4 November 2012 – 21:30	Sevilla	Ramón Sánchez Pizjuán, Sevilla	0–0		Clos Gómez (Aragon)
11	11 November 2012 – 21:30	Real Madrid	Ciutat de València, Valencia	1–2	Ángel 62'	Muñiz Fernández (Asturias)
12	18 November 2012 – 16:00	Deportivo La Coruña	Riazor, A Coruña	2–0	Martins 40', Barkero 82'	Pérez Lasa (Basque Country)
13	25 November 2012 – 21:00	Barcelona	Ciutat de València, Valencia	0–4	Barkero (penalty missed) 87'	Pérez Montero (Andalusia)
14	2 December 2012 – 19:00	Celta Vigo	Balaídos, Vigo	1–1	Roger 89'	Estrada Fernández (Catalonia)
15	9 December 2012 – 19:00	Mallorca	Ciutat de València, Valencia	4–0	Martins 43', Navarro 49', Rubén García 55', Iborra 58'	Delgado Ferreiro (Basque Country)
16	16 December 2012 – 17:00	Real Zaragoza	La Romareda, Zaragoza	1–0	Rubén García 19'	Iglesias Villanueva (Galicia)
17	20 December 2012 – 20:00	Rayo Vallecano	Campo de Vallecas, Vallecas	0–3		J. A. Teixeira Vitienes (Cantabria)
18	6 January 2013 – 21:30	Athletic Bilbao	Ciutat de València, Valencia	3–1	Lell 26', Iborra 45', El Zhar 69'	Paradas Romero (Andalusia)
19	13 January 2013 – 19:00	Real Betis	Benito Villamarín, Sevilla	0–2		Muñiz Fernández (Asturias)
20	20 January 2013 – 19:00	Atlético Madrid	Vicente Calderón, Madrid	0–2		Delgado Ferreiro (Basque Country)
21	26 January 2013 – 18:00	Real Valladolid	Ciutat de València, Valencia	2–1	Barkero 43', Rukavina 90' (o.g.)	Álvarez Izquierdo (Catalonia)
22	2 February 2013 – 20:00	Espanyol	Cornellà-El Prat, Cornellà de Llobregat	2–3	Rubén García 47', Martins 87'	Del Cerro Grande (Community of Madrid)
23	9 February 2013 – 20:00	Málaga	Ciutat de València, Valencia	1–2	Barkero 27' (pen.)	Clos Gómez (Aragon)
24	17 February 2013 – 19:00	Real Sociedad	Anoeta, San Sebastián	1–1	Míchel 29' (pen.)	Hernández Hernández (Catalonia)
25	25 February 2013 – 21:00	Osasuna	Ciutat de València, Valencia	0–2		González González (Castile and León)
26	2 March 2013 – 22:00	Valencia	Mestalla, Valencia	2–2	Iborra 16', Barkero 89'	Velasco Carballo (Community of Madrid)
27	10 March 2013 – 17:00	Getafe	Ciutat de València, Valencia	0–0		Undiano Mallenco (Navarre)
28	17 March 2013 – 21:00	Granada	Los Cármenes, Granada	1-1	Acquafresca 49'	Gil Manzano (Extremadura)
29	31 March 2013 –	Sevilla	Ciutat de València, Valencia	1–0	Rubén García 39'	Teixeira Vitienes (Cantabria)
30	7 April 2013 –	Real Madrid	Santiago Bernabéu, Madrid	5-1	Míchel 31'	Clos Gómez (Aragon)
31	14 April 2013 –	Deportivo La Coruña	Ciutat de València, Valencia	0-4		Estrada Fernández (Catalonia)
32	21 April 2013 –	Barcelona	Camp Nou, Barcelona	1-0		Undiano Mallenco (Navarre)
33	28 April 2013 –	Celta Vigo	Ciutat de València, Valencia	0-1		Muñiz Fernández (Asturias)
34	5 May 2013 –	Mallorca	Iberostar, Palma	1-1	Acquafresca 41'	González González (Castile and León)
35	12 May 2013 –	Real Zaragoza	Ciutat de València, Valencia	0-0		Gil Manzano (Extremadura)
36	19 May 2013 –	Rayo Vallecano	Ciutat de València, Valencia	3-2	Acquafresca 52' Iborra 86'	Undiano Mallenco (Navarre)
37	26 May 2013 –	Athletic Bilbao	San Mamés, Bilbao	0-1	Juanlu 89'	J. A. Teixeira Vitienes (Cantabria)
38	1 June 2013 –	Real Betis	Ciutat de València, Valencia	1–1	Pedro Ríos 50'	J. A. Teixeira Vitienes (Cantabria)

=== Copa del Rey ===
Kickoff times are in CET.

Round	Date	Time	Opponents	Location	Score	Scorers	Referee
Round of 32 (1st leg)	1 November 2012	18:00	Melilla	A	0–1		Del Cerro Grande (Community of Madrid)
Round of 32 (2nd leg)	28 November 2012	19:30	Melilla	H	4–1 (4–2 agg.)	Nikos 25', Roger 62', Míchel 76', Iborra 85' (pen.)	González González (Castile and León)
Round of 16 (1st leg)	13 December 2012	20:00	Real Zaragoza	H	0–1		Pérez Montero (Andalusia)
Round of 16 (2nd leg)	9 January 2013	21:30	Real Zaragoza	A	0–2 (0–3 agg.)		Estrada Fernández (Catalonia)

=== UEFA Europa League ===
==== Qualifying stage ====
Kickoff times are in CET.

Round	Date/Time	Opponents	Location	Score	Scorers	Referee
Play-off round (1st leg)	23 August 2012 – 20:45	(Scotland) Motherwell	Fir Park, Motherwell	2–0	Juanlu 42', El Zhar 62'	Antti Munukka (Finland)
Play-off round (2nd leg)	30 August 2012 – 20:45	(Scotland) Motherwell	Ciutat de València, Valencia	1–0 (3–0 agg.)	Gekas 72'	Clément Turpin (France)

==== Group stage ====
Pos	Team	Pld	W	D	L	GF	GA	GD	Pts	Qualification
1	(Germany) Hannover 96	6	3	3	0	11	8	+3	12	Advance to knockout phase
2	(Spain) Levante	6	3	2	1	10	5	+5	11	Advance to knockout phase
3	(Sweden) Helsingborgs IF	6	1	1	4	9	12	−3	4 (Note: Head-to-head points: Helsingborg 4, Twente 1.)	
4	(Netherlands) Twente	6	0	4	2	5	10	−5	4	

Source: Soccerway
Notes:

Kickoff times are in CET.

Round	Date/Time	Opponents	Location	Score	Scorers	Referee
Matchday 1	20 September 2012 – 21:05	(Sweden) Helsingborg	Ciutat de València, Valencia	1–0	Juanfran 40'	Aleksei Kulbakov (Belarus)
Matchday 2	4 October 2012 – 19:00	(Germany) Hannover 96	AWD-Arena, Hanover	1–2	Míchel 10' (pen.)	Liran Liany (Israel)
Matchday 3	25 October 2012 – 19:00	(Netherlands) Twente	Ciutat de València, Valencia	3–0	Míchel 59' (pen.), Ríos 78', 88'	Vladislav Bezborodov (Russia)
Matchday 4	8 November 2012 – 21:00	(Netherlands) Twente	De Grolsch Veste, Enschede	0–0		Tony Chapron (France)
Matchday 5	22 November 2012 – 19:00	(Sweden) Helsingborg	Olympia, Helsingborg	3–1	Ángel 8', Diop 37', Iborra 81'	Alan Kelly (Republic of Ireland)
Matchday 6	6 December 2012 – 21:05	(Germany) Hannover 96	Ciutat de València, Valencia	2–2	Ángel 49', Iborra 90+4'	Alexandru Tudor (Romania)

==== Knockout stage ====
Round	Date/Time	Opponents	Location	Score	Scorers	Referee
Round of 32 (1st leg)	14 February 2013 – 19:00	(Greece) Olympiacos	Ciutat de València, Valencia	3–0	Pedro Ríos 10', Martins (penalty missed) 30', 56', Barkero 40' (pen.)	Manuel Gräfe (Germany)
Round of 32 (2nd leg)	21 February 2013 – 21:05	(Greece) Olympiacos	Karaiskakis Stadium, Piraeus	1–0 (4–0 agg.)	Martins 9'	Matej Jug (Slovenia)
Round of 16 (1st leg)	7 March 2013 – 21:05	(Russia) Rubin Kazan	Ciutat de València, Valencia	0–0		Antony Gautier (France)
Round of 16 (2nd leg)	14 March 2013 – 18:00	(Russia) Rubin Kazan	Luzhniki Stadium, Moscow	0–2 (a.e.t.)(0–2 agg.)		Aleksandar Stavrev (Macedonia)

== Squad ==
As of 17 March 2013.

No.	Pos.	Name	League		Cup		Europe		Total		Discipline			Note
No.	Pos.	Name	Apps	Goals	Apps	Goals	Apps	Goals	Apps	Goals	Yellow card	Yellow-red card	Red card	Note
1	GK	(Uruguay) Gustavo Munúa	24	0	–	–	–	–	24	0	3			
13	GK	(Costa Rica) Keylor Navas	2	0	4	0	9	0	15	0				
2	DF	(Italy) Massimo Volta	–	–	4	0	–	–	4	0	2			on loan from (Italy) Sampdoria
4	DF	(Spain) David Navarro	23	1	1	0	7	0	31	1	6	1		
5	DF	(Spain) Héctor Rodas	3 (3)	0	4	0	7 (1)	0	12 (4)	0	2		1	
6	DF	(Greece) Loukas Vyntra	4	0	–	–	–	–	4	0	2			
12	DF	(Spain) Juanfran	21	0	0 (1)	0	5	1	26 (1)	1	7			
15	DF	(Greece) Nikos Karabelas	2 (1)	0	4	1	4	0	9 (1)	1	2	2		
18	DF	(Spain) Sergio Ballesteros (C)	22	0	1 (1)	0	9	0	32 (1)	0	14			
19	DF	(Spain) Pedro López	10	0	2	0	7 (1)	0	19 (1)	0	5			
22	DF	(Germany) Christian Lell	15 (1)	2	1	0	5	0	21 (1)	2	2	1		
28	DF	(Spain) Iván	–	–	1	0	–	–	1	0				
7	MF	(Spain) José Barkero	21 (2)	5	–	–	5 (5)	1	26 (7)	6	5			
8	MF	(Morocco) Nabil El Zhar	17 (4)	2	1 (1)	0	2 (2)	1	21 (6)	3	6			
10	MF	(Spain) Vicente Iborra	24	3	1 (1)	1	11	2	34 (3)	6	9	1		
11	MF	(Spain) Rubén García	11 (8)	3	2 (1)	0	6 (3)	0	19 (12)	3	3			
14	MF	(Poland) Dariusz Dudka	0 (2)	0	0 (1)	0	1 (1)	0	1 (4)	0				
16	MF	(Spain) Pedro Ríos	5 (8)	1	3	0	7 (1)	3	15 (9)	4	3			
17	MF	(Cape Verde) Valdo	1 (4)	0	–	–	0 (2)	0	1 (6)	0	1			on loan from (Mexico) Atlante
20	MF	(Spain) Juanlu	13 (6)	1	2 (1)	0	4 (3)	1	19 (10)	2	7			
23	MF	(Senegal) Pape Diop	22	0	2	0	8	1	32	1	12			
9	FW	(Italy) Robert Acquafresca	1	0	–	–	0 (2)	0	1 (2)	0				on loan from (Italy) Bologna
21	FW	(Spain) Míchel	12 (12)	3	3	1	9 (2)	2	19 (14)	5	9	1	1	
27	FW	(Spain) Roger	1 (5)	1	2 (1)	1	–	–	3 (6)	2	2			
–	MF	(Spain) Óscar Serrano	–	–	2	0	0 (1)	0	2 (1)	0				
–	MF	(Spain) Miguel Pallardó	0 (5)	0	4	0	0 (5)	0	4 (10)	0	1			on loan to Almería
–	FW	(Spain) Ángel	2 (7)	1	3 (1)	0	3 (3)	2	8 (11)	3	1			on loan to Elche
–	FW	(Nigeria) Obafemi Martins	18 (2)	7	1 (2)	0	3	2	22 (4)	9	7			
–	FW	(Greece) Theofanis Gekas	2 (2)	0	–	–	5	1	7 (2)	1	1			

*Italics denotes no longer with club.
