= André Wiwerink =

German footballer

Personal information
- Date of birth: 15 October 1980 (age 46)
- Place of birth: Neuenkirchen, West Germany
- Position: Central defender

Youth career
- TuS St. Arnold
- –1999: SuS Neuenkirchen

Senior career*
Years	Team	Apps	(Gls)
1999–2002	Schalke 04 II	65	(4)
2002–2003	SV Adler Osterfeld	32	(1)
2003–2004	1. FC Kleve	30	(2)
2004–2005	Rot-Weiss Essen	2	(0)
2005–2008	Wuppertaler SV Borussia	94	(4)
2008–2010	Bonner SC	66	(1)
2010–2012	Sportfreunde Lotte	67	(4)
2012–2013	Wuppertaler SV Borussia	19	(2)
2013	Sportfreunde Lotte	10	(0)
Total		385	(18)
- * Club domestic league appearances and goals

André Wiwerink (born 15 October 1980) is a German former footballer and trainer. He was a defender. Early in his career, he played for Schalke 04 II. As of 2020, he was playing for VfB Kirchhellen.
