= Vukašin Dević =

Serbian footballer

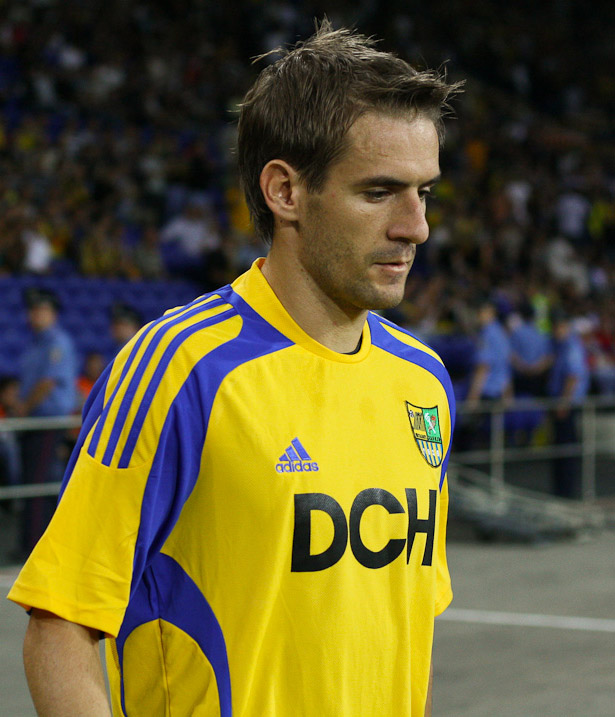

Personal information
- Full name: Vukašin Dević
- Date of birth: 15 March 1984 (age 42)
- Place of birth: Belgrade, SFR Yugoslavia
- Height: 1.96 m (6 ft 5 in)
- Position: Defender

Youth career
- 2002–2003: Radnički Beograd

Senior career*
Years	Team	Apps	(Gls)
2003	Srem Jakovo	1	(0)
2004–2005	Jedinstvo Surčin	44	(6)
2006	Radnički Pirot	33	(2)
2007	Beira-Mar	10	(1)
2007–2008	Belenenses	9	(0)
2008	Red Star Belgrade	2	(0)
2009–2010	Belenenses	12	(1)
Total		111	(10)
- * Club domestic league appearances and goals

Vukašin Dević (Serbian Cyrillic: Вукашин Девић; born 15 March 1984) is a Serbian retired footballer who played as a defender.
