= Andrés Madrid =

Argentine footballer and manager

Personal information
- Full name: Andrés David Madrid
- Date of birth: 29 July 1981 (age 45)
- Place of birth: Mar del Plata, Argentina
- Height: 1.82 m (6 ft 0 in)
- Position: Midfielder

Youth career
- 1998–1999: Platense

Senior career*
| Years | Team | Apps | (Gls) |
| 1999–2000 | Platense | 18 | (0) |
| 2001–2004 | Gimnasia La Plata | 59 | (5) |
| 2005–2011 | Braga | 94 | (2) |
| 2009 | → Porto (loan) | 6 | (0) |
| 2011–2012 | Nacional | 13 | (0) |
| 2012–2013 | Libolo | 1 | (0) |
| 2014–2015 | Mirandela | 23 | (2) |
| 2015 | Vianense | 2 | (0) |
| Total | | 216 | (9) |

Managerial career
- 2015: Vianense
- 2016–2017: Tirsense
- 2017–2018: Rebordosa
- * Club domestic league appearances and goals

Andrés David Madrid (born 29 July 1981) is an Argentine former footballer who played as a defensive midfielder, and is a current manager.

He spent most of his professional career in Portugal, mainly with Braga.

== Football career ==
Born in Mar del Plata, Buenos Aires Province, Madrid started playing football in the youth ranks of Club Atlético Platense, making his professional debut in 1998. He would first appear in the Argentine Primera División with Club de Gimnasia y Esgrima La Plata, in the 2000–01 season.

Madrid moved to Portugal in January 2005, joining S.C. Braga of the Primeira Liga. His league debut took place on 4 February in a derby 0–1 away loss against Vitória de Guimarães. He went on to become an important figure for the Minho club as it achieved three consecutive fourth places, with the respective UEFA Cup qualification.

However, after some injury problems, Madrid fell out of favour in Braga and, during the 2009 January transfer window, joined former coach Jesualdo Ferreira at FC Porto, which had the possibility of making the move permanent at the end of the campaign. He made his first league appearance for his new team on 7 March by playing 21 minutes in a 4–1 win at Leixões SC, and contributed with six appearances – although only one complete – to help the Dragons collect a fourth consecutive league title, subsequently returning to Braga.

In the following years, Madrid's importance gradually diminished, and he was released by the club on 31 August 2011. On 27 September, he signed a one-year contract with fellow league side C.D. Nacional.

Madrid signed with C.R.D. Libolo in November 2012, thus becoming the first Argentine footballer to play in the Angolan League. Following a poor individual season, he returned to Portugal for a trial with S.C. Olhanense, being released shortly after.

== Honours ==
Porto

- Primeira Liga: 2008–09
- Taça de Portugal: 2008–09
