= Benjamin Schwarz (footballer) =

German footballer (born 1986)

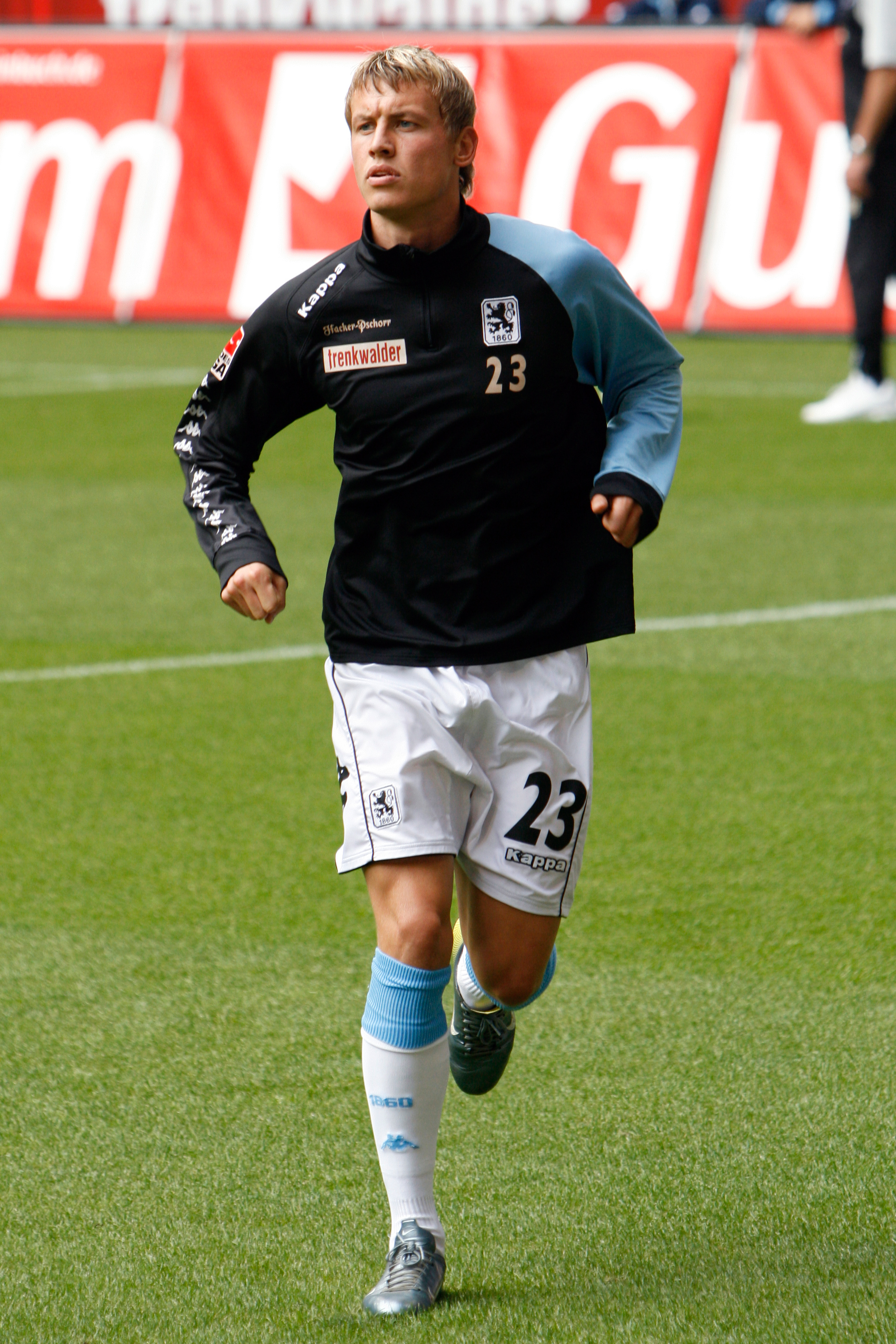

Personal information
- Date of birth: 10 July 1986 (age 40)
- Place of birth: Munich, West Germany
- Height: 1.80 m (5 ft 11 in)
- Position: Left back

Youth career
- 1991–1995: SV Ludwigsvorstadt
- 1995–1999: SC 1880 München
- 1999–2002: SpVgg Unterhaching
- 2002–2005: 1860 Munich

Senior career*
Years	Team	Apps	(Gls)
2005–2012	1860 Munich II	62	(2)
2007–2012	1860 Munich	28	(0)
2010	→ SpVgg Unterhaching (loan)	2	(0)
2013–2015	SpVgg Unterhaching	67	(4)
2015–2019	Preußen Münster	56	(1)
- * Club domestic league appearances and goals as of 18:23, 1 July 2019 (UTC)

Benjamin Schwarz (born 10 July 1986) is a German footballer who most recently played for Preußen Münster, as a left back.

== Career ==
Born in Munich, Schwarz began his career 1991 with SV Ludwigsvorstadt and played here four years before signed for SC 1880 München. He played for the youth team four years. In summer 1999, he was scouted by SpVgg Unterhaching, and later was signed by TSV 1860 München in the 2002–03 season. Schwarz made his professional debut in the 2. Bundesliga for 1860 Munich on 27 September 2007 when he came on as a substitute in the 87th minute in a match against Mainz 05. After only 22 games for TSV 1860 München, Schwarz left the team on 11 January 2010 to sign a loan deal over six months with SpVgg Unterhaching.

Schwarz joined Preußen Münster in the summer 2015. After four years, he left the club at the end of the 2018/19 season.
